= 2020 Harvest Grand Prix =

(United States) 2020 Harvest Grand Prix
Race details
12th and 13th round of the 2020 IndyCar Series season
← Previous race	Next race →
- Date: October 2 and 3, 2020
- Official name: Indycar Harvest Grand Prix
- Location: Indianapolis Motor Speedway; Speedway, Indiana, United States
- Course: Permanent racing facility 2.439 mi / 3.925 km
- Distance: 85 laps 207.315 mi / {{{Distance_km}}} km
Race 1
- Weather: 60 °F (16 °C), mostly cloudy

Pole position
- Driver: (Netherlands) Rinus Veekay (Ed Carpenter Racing)
- Time: 01:09.6903

Fastest lap
- Driver: (Netherlands) Rinus VeeKay (Ed Carpenter Racing)
- Time: 1:10.5582 (on lap 21 of 85)

Podium
- First: (United States) Josef Newgarden (Team Penske)
- Second: (United States) Alexander Rossi (Andretti Autosport)
- Third: (Netherlands) Rinus VeeKay (Ed Carpenter Racing)
Race 2
- Weather: 64 °F (18 °C), mostly cloudy

Pole position
- Driver: (Australia) Will Power (Team Penske)
- Time: 1:08.9767

Fastest lap
- Driver: (France) Simon Pagenaud (Team Penske)
- Time: 1:11.3775 (on lap 53 of 75)

Podium
- First: (Australia) Will Power (Team Penske)
- Second: (United States) Colton Herta (Andretti Harding Steinbrenner Autosport)
- Third: (United States) Alexander Rossi (Andretti Autosport)

Chronology
Previous	Next
July 2020	May 2021

The 2020 Harvest Grand Prix was IndyCar Series event held on October 2–3, 2020. It made up the twelfth and thirteenth and penultimate rounds of the series' 2020 season. Rinus VeeKay won pole for the first race with Josef Newgarden taking victory. Will Power led every lap from pole position to take victory in the second race.

== Background ==
As a result of races cancelled by the COVID-19 pandemic, the IndyCar Series announced on April 6, 2020, that a third trip to the Indianapolis Motor Speedway would be added to the 2020 season as a support race for the Intercontinental GT Challenge's Indianapolis 8 Hours. The Harvest name paid tribute to the Harvest Auto Racing Classic, the only event held outside the Month of May at the Speedway between 1911 and 1993. Following further race cancellations, on July 27, 2020, the IndyCar Series changed the weekend from a single race to a doubleheader weekend.

The Speedway opened the gates to spectators for the first time in 2020 after being behind closed doors for much of the season, with a limit of 10,000 spectators for practice day, and the three race days (including the Intercontinental GT Challenge event that was the feature).

=== Entrants ===
A. J. Foyt Enterprises announce the signing of Sébastien Bourdais for the remainder of the 2020 season starting with the Harvest Grand Prix. Locally based Dreyer & Reinbold Racing made their third race weekend appearance with Sage Karam, making 2020 the most appearances by the team since the 2013 season. A week before the race, Indycar's medical team declared rookie Oliver Askew as not fit to drive. Arrow McLaren SP replaced Askew with vetern Hélio Castroneves. It would be Castroneves' first open-wheel start away from Team Penske since the 1999 Marlboro 500. A day later, James Hinchcliffe was announced as taking over Andretti Autosport's #26 entry for Zach Veach.

Key	Meaning
R	Rookie
W	Past winner

No.	Driver	Team	Engine
1	(United States) Josef Newgarden	Team Penske	Chevrolet
4	(United States) Charlie Kimball	A. J. Foyt Enterprises	Chevrolet
5	(Mexico) Pato O'Ward	Arrow McLaren SP	Chevrolet
7	(Brazil) Hélio Castroneves	Arrow McLaren SP	Chevrolet
8	(Sweden) Marcus Ericsson	Chip Ganassi Racing	Honda
9	(New Zealand) Scott Dixon W	Chip Ganassi Racing	Honda
10	(Sweden) Felix Rosenqvist	Chip Ganassi Racing	Honda
12	(Australia) Will Power W	Team Penske	Chevrolet
14	(France) Sébastien Bourdais	A. J. Foyt Enterprises	Chevrolet
15	(United States) Graham Rahal	Rahal Letterman Lanigan Racing	Honda
18	(United States) Santino Ferrucci	Dale Coyne Racing with Vasser-Sullivan	Honda
20	(United States) Conor Daly	Ed Carpenter Racing	Chevrolet
21	(Netherlands) Rinus VeeKay R	Ed Carpenter Racing	Chevrolet
22	(France) Simon Pagenaud W	Team Penske	Chevrolet
24	(United States) Sage Karam	Dreyer & Reinbold Racing	Chevrolet
26	(Canada) James Hinchcliffe	Andretti Autosport	Honda
27	(United States) Alexander Rossi	Andretti Autosport	Honda
28	(United States) Ryan Hunter-Reay	Andretti Autosport	Honda
30	(Japan) Takuma Sato	Rahal Letterman Lanigan Racing	Honda
41	(Canada) Dalton Kellett R	A. J. Foyt Enterprises	Chevrolet
55	(Spain) Álex Palou R	Dale Coyne Racing with Team Goh	Honda
59	(United Kingdom) Max Chilton	Carlin	Chevrolet
60	(United Kingdom) Jack Harvey	Meyer Shank Racing	Honda
88	(United States) Colton Herta	Andretti Harding Steinbrenner Autosport	Honda
98	(United States) Marco Andretti	Andretti Herta Autosport w/ Marco Andretti & Curb-Agajanian	Honda

== Practice ==
A single practice session was held over the weekend. The session was held October 1 at 2:15 PM ET

Top Practice Speeds
Pos	No.	Driver	Team	Engine	Lap Time
1	55	(Spain) Álex Palou R	Dale Coyne Racing with Team Goh	Honda	01:10.1777
2	60	(United Kingdom) Jack Harvey	Meyer Shank Racing	Honda	01:10.2773
3	88	(United States) Colton Herta	Andretti Harding Steinbrenner Autosport	Honda	01:10.3857

== Race 1 – October 1–2 ==
=== Qualifying ===
Qualifying was held the day before the race at 6:20 PM ET. As the event was doubleheader, series rules meant qualifying was a single round (instead of two rounds as normal), split into two groups. Drivers from the group with the fastest driver having the better time started in the odd number positions, while the group whose fastest time was worse than the other group took even number positions.

=== Qualifying classification ===
Pos	No.	Driver	Team	Engine	Group	Time	Final grid								
Pos	No.	Driver	Team	Engine	Group	Time	Final grid	1	21	(Netherlands) Rinus VeeKay R	Ed Carpenter Racing	Chevrolet	2	01:09.6903	1
Pos	No.	Driver	Team	Engine	Group	Time	Final grid	2	1	(United States) Josef Newgarden	Team Penske	Chevrolet	1	01:10.4706	2
3	88	(United States) Colton Herta	Andretti Harding Steinbrenner Autosport	Honda	2	01:09.7048	3								
4	12	(Australia) Will Power W	Team Penske	Chevrolet	1	01:10.5686	4								
5	98	(United States) Marco Andretti	Andretti Herta Autosport w/ Marco Andretti & Curb-Agajanian	Honda	2	01:09.7140	5								
6	60	(United Kingdom) Jack Harvey	Meyer Shank Racing	Honda	1	01:10.6234	6								
7	10	(Sweden) Felix Rosenqvist	Chip Ganassi Racing	Honda	2	01:09.8007	7								
8	27	(United States) Alexander Rossi	Andretti Autosport	Honda	1	01:10.6500	8								
9	59	(United Kingdom) Max Chilton	Carlin	Chevrolet	2	01:09.8193	9								
10	5	(Mexico) Pato O'Ward	Arrow McLaren SP	Chevrolet	1	01:10.7290	10								
11	15	(United States) Graham Rahal	Rahal Letterman Lanigan Racing	Honda	2	01:09.8830	11								
12	9	(New Zealand) Scott Dixon W	Chip Ganassi Racing	Honda	1	01:10.8953	12								
13	28	(United States) Ryan Hunter-Reay	Andretti Autosport	Honda	2	01:09.9872	13								
14	20	(United States) Conor Daly	Ed Carpenter Racing	Chevrolet	1	01:10.9374	14								
15	8	(Sweden) Marcus Ericsson	Chip Ganassi Racing	Honda	2	01:10.0017	15								
16	14	(France) Sébastien Bourdais	A. J. Foyt Enterprises	Chevrolet	1	01:10.9588	16								
17	55	(Spain) Álex Palou R	Dale Coyne Racing with Team Goh	Honda	2	01:10.0323	17								
18	26	(Canada) James Hinchcliffe	Andretti Autosport	Honda	1	01:10.9630	18								
19	7	(Brazil) Hélio Castroneves	Arrow McLaren SP	Chevrolet	2	01:10.3965	19								
20	18	(United States) Santino Ferrucci	Dale Coyne Racing with Vasser-Sullivan	Honda	1	01:11.0040	20								
21	24	(United States) Sage Karam	Dreyer & Reinbold Racing	Chevrolet	2	01:10.6224	21								
22	22	(France) Simon Pagenaud W	Team Penske	Chevrolet	1	01:11.0488	22								
23	4	(United States) Charlie Kimball W	A. J. Foyt Enterprises	Chevrolet	2	01:10.7500	23								
24	30	(Japan) Takuma Sato	Rahal Letterman Lanigan Racing	Honda	1	01:14.8983	24								
25	41	(Canada) Dalton Kellett R	A. J. Foyt Enterprises	Chevrolet	2	01:11.7237	25								

=== Race ===
The first race was held October 2 at 3:30 PM ET.

=== Race classification ===
Pos	No.	Driver	Team	Engine	Laps	Time/Retired	Pit Stops	Grid	Laps Led	Pts.
1	1	(United States) Josef Newgarden	Team Penske	Chevrolet	85	1:44:28.5561	3	2	34	54
2	27	(United States) Alexander Rossi	Andretti Autosport	Honda	85	+14.2940	3	8		40
3	21	(Netherlands) Rinus VeeKay R	Ed Carpenter Racing	Chevrolet	85	+15.0377	3	1	15	37
4	88	(United States) Colton Herta	Andretti Harding Steinbrenner Autosport	Honda	85	+17.3950	3	3	29	33
5	10	(Sweden) Felix Rosenqvist	Chip Ganassi Racing	Honda	85	+18.4580	3	7	1	31
6	12	(Australia) Will Power W	Team Penske	Chevrolet	85	+26.1379	3	4		28
7	15	(United States) Graham Rahal	Rahal Letterman Lanigan Racing	Honda	85	+27.3767	3	11	5	27
8	60	(United Kingdom) Jack Harvey	Meyer Shank Racing	Honda	85	+28.5311	3	6		24
9	9	(New Zealand) Scott Dixon W	Chip Ganassi Racing	Honda	85	+30.7960	3	12		22
10	8	(Sweden) Marcus Ericsson	Chip Ganassi Racing	Honda	85	+36.9727	2	15		20
11	59	(United Kingdom) Max Chilton	Carlin	Chevrolet	85	+47.5513	3	9		19
12	20	(United States) Conor Daly	Ed Carpenter Racing	Chevrolet	85	+56.9548	3	14		18
13	4	(United States) Charlie Kimball	A. J. Foyt Enterprises	Chevrolet	85	+1:10.8969	3	23		17
14	26	(Canada) James Hinchcliffe	Andretti Autosport	Honda	85	+1:11.9901	3	18		16
15	18	(United States) Santino Ferrucci	Dale Coyne Racing with Vasser-Sullivan	Honda	84	+1 Lap	3	20	1	16
16	22	(France) Simon Pagenaud W	Team Penske	Chevrolet	84	+1 Lap	3	22		14
17	55	(Spain) Álex Palou R	Dale Coyne Racing with Team Goh	Honda	84	+1 Lap	3	17		13
18	30	(Japan) Takuma Sato	Rahal Letterman Lanigan Racing	Honda	84	+1 Lap	3	24		12
19	28	(United States) Ryan Hunter-Reay	Andretti Autosport	Honda	84	+1 Lap	3	13		11
20	7	(Brazil) Hélio Castroneves	Arrow McLaren SP	Chevrolet	84	+1 Lap	3	19		10
21	14	(France) Sébastien Bourdais	A. J. Foyt Enterprises	Chevrolet	84	+1 Lap	3	16		9
22	5	(Mexico) Pato O'Ward	Arrow McLaren SP	Chevrolet	84	+1 Lap	4	10		8
23	24	(United States) Sage Karam	Dreyer & Reinbold Racing	Chevrolet	84	+1 Lap	3	21		7
24	41	(Canada) Dalton Kellett R	A. J. Foyt Enterprises	Chevrolet	83	+2 Laps	3	25		6
25	98	(United States) Marco Andretti	Andretti Herta Autosport w/ Marco Andretti & Curb-Agajanian	Honda	79	Mechanical	3	5		5
Fastest lap: (Netherlands) Rinus VeeKay (Ed Carpenter Racing) – 01:10.5582 (lap 21)

== Race 2 – October 3 ==
=== Qualifying ===
Qualifying at 10:20 AM ET.

=== Qualifying classification ===
Pos	No.	Driver	Team	Engine	Group	Time	Final grid								
Pos	No.	Driver	Team	Engine	Group	Time	Final grid	1	12	(Australia) Will Power W	Team Penske	Chevrolet	2	01:08.9767	1
Pos	No.	Driver	Team	Engine	Group	Time	Final grid	2	88	(United States) Colton Herta	Andretti Harding Steinbrenner Autosport	Honda	1	01:09.1017	2
3	27	(United States) Alexander Rossi	Andretti Autosport	Honda	2	01:09.2315	3								
4	55	(Spain) Álex Palou R	Dale Coyne Racing with Team Goh	Honda	1	01:09.1584	4								
5	5	(Mexico) Pato O'Ward	Arrow McLaren SP	Chevrolet	2	01:09.2477	5								
6	28	(United States) Ryan Hunter-Reay	Andretti Autosport	Honda	1	01:09.1755	6								
7	60	(United Kingdom) Jack Harvey	Meyer Shank Racing	Honda	2	01:09.4216	7								
8	10	(Sweden) Felix Rosenqvist	Chip Ganassi Racing	Honda	1	01:09.2988	8								
9	1	(United States) Josef Newgarden	Team Penske	Chevrolet	2	01:09.4557	9								
10	15	(United States) Graham Rahal	Rahal Letterman Lanigan Racing	Honda	1	01:09.3258	10								
11	18	(United States) Santino Ferrucci	Dale Coyne Racing with Vasser-Sullivan	Honda	2	01:09.4791	11								
12	98	(United States) Marco Andretti	Andretti Herta Autosport w/ Marco Andretti & Curb-Agajanian	Honda	1	01:09.3730	12								
13	26	(Canada) James Hinchcliffe	Andretti Autosport	Honda	2	01:09.5754	13								
14	21	(Netherlands) Rinus VeeKay R	Ed Carpenter Racing	Chevrolet	1	01:09.4057	14								
15	9	(New Zealand) Scott Dixon W	Chip Ganassi Racing	Honda	2	01:09.5824	15								
16	8	(Sweden) Marcus Ericsson	Chip Ganassi Racing	Honda	1	01:09.4109	16								
17	30	(Japan) Takuma Sato	Rahal Letterman Lanigan Racing	Honda	2	01:09.6077	17								
18	59	(United Kingdom) Max Chilton	Carlin	Chevrolet	1	01:09.6739	18								
19	22	(France) Simon Pagenaud W	Team Penske	Chevrolet	2	01:09.9216	19								
20	7	(Brazil) Hélio Castroneves	Arrow McLaren SP	Chevrolet	1	01:09.7761	20								
21	14	(France) Sébastien Bourdais	A. J. Foyt Enterprises	Chevrolet	2	01:09.9427	21								
22	24	(United States) Sage Karam	Dreyer & Reinbold Racing	Chevrolet	1	01:09.9159	22								
23	20	(United States) Conor Daly	Ed Carpenter Racing	Chevrolet	2	01:09.9531	23								
24	4	(United States) Charlie Kimball	A. J. Foyt Enterprises	Chevrolet	1	01:09.9661	24								
25	41	(Canada) Dalton Kellett R	A. J. Foyt Enterprises	Chevrolet	1	01:10.1960	25								

=== Race ===
The second race of the weekend was held October 3 at 2:30 PM ET.

=== Race classification ===
Pos	No.	Driver	Team	Engine	Laps	Time/Retired	Pit Stops	Grid	Laps Led	Pts.
1	12	(Australia) Will Power W	Team Penske	Chevrolet	75	1:32:08.5228	2	1	75	54
2	88	(United States) Colton Herta	Andretti Harding Steinbrenner Autosport	Honda	75	+0.8932	2	2		41
3	27	(United States) Alexander Rossi	Andretti Autosport	Honda	75	+6.1900	2	3		35
4	1	(United States) Josef Newgarden	Team Penske	Chevrolet	75	+9.5889	2	9		32
5	5	(Mexico) Pato O'Ward	Arrow McLaren SP	Chevrolet	75	+10.0770	2	5		30
6	60	(United Kingdom) Jack Harvey	Meyer Shank Racing	Honda	75	+17.9886	2	7		28
7	15	(United States) Graham Rahal	Rahal Letterman Lanigan Racing	Honda	75	+18.5055	2	10		26
8	9	(New Zealand) Scott Dixon W	Chip Ganassi Racing	Honda	75	+20.5209	2	15		24
9	55	(Spain) Álex Palou R	Dale Coyne Racing with Team Goh	Honda	75	+23.2356	2	4		22
10	22	(France) Simon Pagenaud W	Team Penske	Chevrolet	75	+35.4374	2	19		20
11	10	(Sweden) Felix Rosenqvist	Chip Ganassi Racing	Honda	75	+39.4429	2	8		19
12	18	(United States) Santino Ferrucci	Dale Coyne Racing with Vasser-Sullivan	Honda	75	+40.2812	2	11		18
13	26	(Canada) James Hinchcliffe	Andretti Autosport	Honda	75	+52.7124	2	13		17
14	30	(Japan) Takuma Sato	Rahal Letterman Lanigan Racing	Honda	75	+52.9907	2	17		16
15	8	(Sweden) Marcus Ericsson	Chip Ganassi Racing	Honda	75	+54.5865	2	16		15
16	28	(United States) Ryan Hunter-Reay	Andretti Autosport	Honda	75	+55.3748	3	6		14
17	21	(Netherlands) Rinus VeeKay R	Ed Carpenter Racing	Chevrolet	75	+59.7606	2	14		13
18	14	(France) Sébastien Bourdais	A. J. Foyt Enterprises	Chevrolet	75	+1:10.9683	2	21		12
19	59	(United Kingdom) Max Chilton	Carlin	Chevrolet	75	+1:11.4686	2	18		11
20	20	(United States) Conor Daly	Ed Carpenter Racing	Chevrolet	74	+1 Lap	2	23		10
21	7	(Brazil) Hélio Castroneves	Arrow McLaren SP	Chevrolet	74	+1 Lap	3	20		9
22	98	(United States) Marco Andretti	Andretti Herta Autosport w/ Marco Andretti & Curb-Agajanian	Honda	74	+1 Lap	2	12		8
23	4	(United States) Charlie Kimball	A. J. Foyt Enterprises	Chevrolet	74	+1 Lap	3	24		7
24	24	(United States) Sage Karam	Dreyer & Reinbold Racing	Chevrolet	74	+1 Lap	2	22		6
25	41	(Canada) Dalton Kellett R	A. J. Foyt Enterprises	Chevrolet	73	+2 Laps	3	25		5
Fastest lap: (France) Simon Pagenaud (Team Penske) – 01:11.3775 (lap 53)

Previous race: 2020 Honda Indy 200	IndyCar Series; 2020 season	Next race: 2020 Firestone Grand Prix of St. Petersburg
Previous race: NEW	Second Indianapolis Motor Speedway Road Course Race	Next race: 2021 Big Machine Spiked Coolers Grand Prix
