= 2020 Bommarito Automotive Group 500 =

(United States) 2020 World Wide Technology Raceway
Race details
8th and 9th round of the 2020 IndyCar Series season
← Previous race	Next race →
- Date: August 29 and 30, 2020
- Official name: Bommarito Automotive Group 500
- Location: World Wide Technology Raceway
- Course: Permanent racing facility 1.25 mi / 2.012 km
- Distance: 400 laps 500 mi / 804.672 km
Race 1

Pole position
- Driver: (Australia) Will Power (Team Penske)
- Time: 24.672

Fastest lap
- Driver: (Japan) Takuma Sato (Rahal Letterman Lanigan Racing)
- Time: 25.3039 (on lap 183 of 400)

Podium
- First: (New Zealand) Scott Dixon (Chip Ganassi Racing)
- Second: (Japan) Takuma Sato (Rahal Letterman Lanigan Racing)
- Third: (Mexico) Patricio O'Ward (Arrow McLaren SP)
Race 2

Pole position
- Driver: (Japan) Takuma Sato (Rahal Letterman Lanigan Racing)
- Time: 24.658

Fastest lap
- Driver: (Spain) Álex Palou (Dale Coyne Racing with Team Goh)
- Time: 25.6915 (on lap 147 of 400)

Podium
- First: (United States) Josef Newgarden (Team Penske)
- Second: (Mexico) Patricio O'Ward (Arrow McLaren SP)
- Third: (Australia) Will Power (Team Penske)

The 2020 Bommarito Automotive Group 500 was an IndyCar Series event that took place from August 29–30, 2020. It made up the eighth and ninth rounds of the 2020 IndyCar Series season. Initially scheduled to be just one race, the one 500 km race was replaced with a doubleheader weekend after cancellations of the events at Portland and Laguna Seca due to the COVID-19 pandemic. Two 200-lap, 250-mile races formed the advertised 500 mile distance.

== Entry list ==
Separate entry lists were released for both events with identical participants, apart from a sponsor change for Felix Rosenqvist from NTT Data to Monster Energy.

Car No.	Driver Name	Owner/Team	Engine
1	(United States) Josef Newgarden W	Team Penske	Chevrolet
4	(United States) Charlie Kimball	A. J. Foyt Enterprises	Chevrolet
5	(Mexico) Patricio O'Ward	Arrow McLaren SP	Chevrolet
7	(United States) Oliver Askew R	Arrow McLaren SP	Chevrolet
8	(Sweden) Marcus Ericsson	Chip Ganassi Racing	Honda
9	(New Zealand) Scott Dixon	Chip Ganassi Racing	Honda
10	(Sweden) Felix Rosenqvist	Chip Ganassi Racing	Honda
12	(Australia) Will Power W	Team Penske	Chevrolet
14	(Brazil) Tony Kanaan	A. J. Foyt Enterprises	Chevrolet
15	(United States) Graham Rahal	Rahal Letterman Lanigan Racing	Honda
18	(United States) Santino Ferrucci	Dale Coyne Racing with Vasser-Sullivan	Honda
20	(United States) Ed Carpenter	Ed Carpenter Racing	Chevrolet
21	(Netherlands) Rinus VeeKay R	Ed Carpenter Racing	Chevrolet
22	(France) Simon Pagenaud	Team Penske	Chevrolet
26	(United States) Zach Veach	Andretti Autosport	Honda
27	(United States) Alexander Rossi	Andretti Autosport	Honda
28	(United States) Ryan Hunter-Reay	Andretti Autosport	Honda
30	(Japan) Takuma Sato W	Rahal Letterman Lanigan Racing	Honda
55	(Spain) Álex Palou R	Dale Coyne Racing with Team Goh	Honda
59	(United States) Conor Daly	Carlin	Chevrolet
60	(United Kingdom) Jack Harvey	Meyer Shank Racing	Honda
88	(United States) Colton Herta	Andretti Harding Steinbrenner Autosport	Honda
98	(United States) Marco Andretti	Andretti Herta Autosport with Marco Andretti & Curb-Agajanian	Honda

All cars run a Dallara safety tub utilizing the IndyCar mandated Universal Aero Kit 18. All cars also will utilize Firestone tires.

Key	Meaning
R	Rookie
W	Past winner

== Practice ==
Patricio O'Ward was fastest in practice with a time of 24.789 seconds and a speed of 181.532 mph (292.147 km/h).

Pos	No.	Driver	Team	Manufacturer	Time	Speed
1	5	Patricio O'Ward	Arrow McLaren SP	Chevrolet	24.789	181.532
2	12	Will Power W	Team Penske	Chevrolet	24.867	180.961
3	9	Scott Dixon	Chip Ganassi Racing	Honda	24.886	180.822

== Combined Qualifying Session, August 29 ==
The pole for Saturday's race was won by Will Power with a time of 24.6718 seconds. The new and now two-time Indy 500 Takuma Sato won the pole for Sunday's race with a time of 24.6577 seconds.

Pos Race 1	Pos Race 2	No.	Name	Lap 1	Lap 2
1	3	12	(Australia) Will Power W	24.6718	24.6611
2	4	5	(Mexico) Patricio O'Ward	24.7149	24.6873
3	6	9	(New Zealand) Scott Dixon	24.7244	24.7613
4	7	10	(Sweden) Marcus Ericsson	24.8120	24.7630
5	1	10	(Japan) Takuma Sato W	24.8226	24.6577
6	2	1	(United States) Josef Newgarden W	24.8314	24.6607
7	5	60	(United Kingdom) Jack Harvey	24.8736	24.7525
8	12	28	(United States) Ryan Hunter-Reay	24.9024	24.9144
9	11	27	(United States) Alexander Rossi	24.9038	24.8860
10	10	88	(United States) Colton Herta	24.9100	24.8394
11	14	55	(Spain) Álex Palou R	24.9173	24.9224
12	9	10	(Sweden) Felix Rosenqvist	24.9591	24.8088
13	8	22	(France) Simon Pagenaud	24.9815	24.7993
14	18	21	(Netherlands) Rinus VeeKay R	24.9903	25.1833
15	13	7	(United States) Oliver Askew R	24.9926	24.9198
16	15	59	(United States) Conor Daly	25.0020	24.9482
17	22	20	(United States) Ed Carpenter	25.0667	25.3196
18	21	4	(United States) Charlie Kimball	25.0905	25.2390
19	20	98	(United States) Marco Andretti	25.2529	25.2012
20	16	18	(United States) Santino Ferrucci	25.2542	24.9727
21	19	14	(Brazil) Tony Kanaan	25.3288	25.1918
22	23	15	(United States) Graham Rahal	25.4821	25.4521
23	17	26	(United States) Zach Veach	25.5661	25.0291

Key	Meaning
R	Rookie
W	Past winner

== Race 1 – August 29 ==
The first 14 laps of the race were run under caution as a result of a six-car crash coming to the green flag. Álex Palou pulled out of line, and was followed by Simon Pagenaud and Oliver Askew. Askew hit Pagenaud, who in turn collected Alexander Rossi. The resulting incident took out Zach Veach, Marco Andretti, and Ed Carpenter, leading to three of the five Andretti Autosport cars retiring inside the opening five laps. Scott Dixon won the event, his fourth of the season, extending his points lead over Josef Newgarden to 117 points.

=== Race ===
Classification
Pos	No.	Driver	Team	Engine	Laps	Time/Retired	Pit Stops	Grid	Laps Led	Pts.^{1}
1	9	(New Zealand) Scott Dixon	Chip Ganassi Racing	Honda	200	1:44:30.7944	3	3	28	51
2	30	(Japan) Takuma Sato W	Rahal Letterman Lanigan Racing	Honda	200	+0.1404	3	5	14	41
3	5	(Mexico) Patricio O'Ward	Arrow McLaren SP	Chevrolet	200	+7.0052	3	2	94	38
4	88	(United States) Colton Herta	Andretti Harding Steinbrenner Autosport	Honda	200	+7.7019	3	10		32
5	8	(Sweden) Marcus Ericsson	Chip Ganassi Racing	Honda	200	+8.3504	3	4		30
6	21	(Netherlands) Rinus VeeKay R	Ed Carpenter Racing	Chevrolet	200	+12.4145	3	14		28
7	28	(United States) Ryan Hunter-Reay	Andretti Autosport	Honda	200	+13.0556	3	8		26
8	10	(Sweden) Felix Rosenqvist	Chip Ganassi Racing	Honda	200	+13.8107	3	12	1	25
9	14	(Brazil) Tony Kanaan	A. J. Foyt Enterprises	Chevrolet	200	+15.0319	4	21		22
10	59	(United States) Conor Daly	Carlin	Chevrolet	200	+15.6721	4	16		20
11	60	(United Kingdom) Jack Harvey	Meyer Shank Racing	Honda	200	+16.2600	4	7		19
12	1	(United States) Josef Newgarden W	Team Penske	Chevrolet	200	+16.8155	4	6		18
13	4	(United States) Charlie Kimball	A. J. Foyt Enterprises	Chevrolet	200	+21.4079	4	18		17
14	7	(United States) Oliver Askew R	Arrow McLaren SP	Chevrolet	200	+24.0143	4	15		16
15	55	(Spain) Álex Palou R	Dale Coyne Racing with Team Goh	Honda	200	+24.6954	3	11		15
16	18	(United States) Santino Ferrucci	Dale Coyne Racing with Vasser-Sullivan	Honda	200	+27.0938	4	20	2	15
17	12	(Australia) Will Power W	Team Penske	Chevrolet	198	+2 laps	5	1	61	15
18	15	(United States) Graham Rahal	Rahal Letterman Lanigan Racing	Honda	124	Mechanical	5	22		12
19	22	(France) Simon Pagenaud	Team Penske	Chevrolet	67	Contact	5	13		11
20	20	(United States) Ed Carpenter	Ed Carpenter Racing	Chevrolet	3	Contact	1	17		10
21	26	(United States) Zach Veach	Andretti Autosport	Honda	2	Contact	0	23		9
22	27	(United States) Alexander Rossi	Andretti Autosport	Honda	0	Contact	0	9		8
23	98	(United States) Marco Andretti	Andretti Autosport	Honda	0	Contact	0	19		7
Official Box Score

Notes: ^{1} Points include 1 point for leading at least 1 lap during a race, an additional 2 points for leading the most race laps, and 1 point for Pole Position.

Race 2 had no DNFs.

=== Race statistics ===
Lead changes: 6

Lap leader breakdown
From lap	To lap	Total laps	Driver
1	61	61	Will Power
62	64	3	Scott Dixon
65	65	1	Felix Rosenqvist
66	67	2	Santino Ferrucci
68	161	94	Patricio O'Ward
162	175	14	Takuma Sato
176	200	25	Scott Dixon

Cautions:2 for 25 laps
From lap	To lap	Total laps	Reason
1	12	12	Contact: Car 7 (Askew), 20 (Carpenter), 22 (Pagenaud), 26 (Veach), 27 (Rossi), 98 (Andretti) in Turn 4
108	120	13	Conditions

Average speed: 143.522 mph (230.976 km/h)

=== Championship standings after the race ===
Drivers' Championship standings

	Pos	Driver	Points
	1	(New Zealand) Scott Dixon	386
	2	(United States) Josef Newgarden	269
	3	(Mexico) Patricio O'Ward	256
2	4	(Japan) Takuma Sato	248
1	5	(United States) Graham Rahal	226

Engine Manufacturer standings

Pos	Manufacturer	Points
1	Honda	688
2	Chevrolet	579

- Note: Only the top five positions are included.

== Race 2 – August 30 ==
The second race began under caution after a vehicle spilled oil on the track during the pace laps. Josef Newgarden won the race, his second win of the season.

=== Race ===
Classification
Pos	No.	Driver	Team	Engine	Laps	Time/Retired	Pit Stops	Grid	Laps Led	Pts.^{1}
1	1	(United States) Josef Newgarden W	Team Penske	Chevrolet	200	1:32:15.2431	3	2	48	51
2	5	(Mexico) Patricio O'Ward	Arrow McLaren SP	Chevrolet	200	+1.4356	3	4	36	41
3	12	(Australia) Will Power W	Team Penske	Chevrolet	200	+3.3580	3	3	40	36
4	21	(Netherlands) Rinus VeeKay R	Ed Carpenter Racing	Chevrolet	200	+4.4369	3	18		32
5	9	(New Zealand) Scott Dixon W	Chip Ganassi Racing	Honda	200	+6.2173	3	6		30
6	88	(United States) Colton Herta	Andretti Harding Steinbrenner Autosport	Honda	200	+7.0022	3	10	10	29
7	10	(Sweden) Felix Rosenqvist	Chip Ganassi Racing	Honda	200	+9.6894	3	9		26
8	59	(United States) Conor Daly	Carlin	Chevrolet	200	+9.9199	3	15		24
9	30	(Japan) Takuma Sato W	Rahal Letterman Lanigan Racing	Honda	200	+10.8130	3	1	66	26
10	18	(United States) Santino Ferrucci	Dale Coyne Racing with Vasser-Sullivan	Honda	200	+15.6741	3	16		20
11	28	(United States) Ryan Hunter-Reay	Andretti Autosport	Honda	200	+16.6569	3	12		19
12	55	(Spain) Álex Palou R	Dale Coyne Racing with Team Goh	Honda	200	+18.8580	3	14		18
13	60	(United Kingdom) Jack Harvey	Meyer Shank Racing	Honda	200	+20.0777	3	5		17
14	27	(United States) Alexander Rossi	Andretti Autosport	Honda	200	+20.9892	3	11		16
15	98	(United States) Marco Andretti	Andretti Autosport	Honda	199	+1 Lap	3	20		15
16	22	(France) Simon Pagenaud	Team Penske	Chevrolet	199	+1 Lap	3	8		14
17	7	(United States) Oliver Askew R	Arrow McLaren SP	Chevrolet	199	+1 Lap	3	13		13
18	4	(United States) Charlie Kimball	A. J. Foyt Enterprises	Chevrolet	199	+1 Lap	3	21		12
19	14	(Brazil) Tony Kanaan	A. J. Foyt Enterprises	Chevrolet	199	+1 Lap	3	19		11
20	15	(United States) Graham Rahal	Rahal Letterman Lanigan Racing	Honda	198	+2 Laps	3	23		10
21	20	(United States) Ed Carpenter	Ed Carpenter Racing	Chevrolet	197	+3 Laps	3	22		9
22	26	(United States) Zach Veach	Andretti Autosport	Honda	196	+4 Laps	4	17		8
23	8	(Sweden) Marcus Ericsson	Chip Ganassi Racing	Honda	190	+10 Laps	3	7		7
Official Box Score

Notes: ^{1} Points include 1 point for leading at least 1 lap during a race, an additional 2 points for leading the most race laps, and 1 point for Pole Position.

=== Race statistics ===
Lead changes: 8

Lap leader breakdown
From lap	To lap	Total laps	Driver
1	59	59	Takuma Sato
60	95	36	Patricio O'Ward
96	97	2	Will Power
98	101	4	Josef Newgarden
102	108	7	Takuma Sato
109	113	5	Colton Herta
114	151	38	Will Power
152	156	5	Colton Herta
157	200	44	Josef Newgarden

Cautions:2 for 5 laps
From lap	To lap	Total laps	Reason
1	1	1	Start under Yellow (Oil on track)
197	200	4	Contact: Car #30 (Sato) in Turn 2

Average speed: 162.594 mph (261.670 km/h)

=== Championship standings after the race ===
Drivers' Championship standings

	Pos	Driver	Points
	1	(New Zealand) Scott Dixon	416
	2	(United States) Josef Newgarden	320
	3	(Mexico) Patricio O'Ward	297
	4	(Japan) Takuma Sato	274
2	5	(United States) Colton Herta	250

Engine Manufacturer standings

Pos	Manufacturer	Points
1	Honda	747
2	Chevrolet	674

- Note: Only the top five positions are included.

Previous race: 104th Running of the Indianapolis 500 Presented by Gainbridge	IndyCar Series; 2020 season	Next race: 2020 Honda Indy 200 at Mid-Ohio
Previous race: 2019 Bommarito Automotive Group 500	Bommarito Automotive Group 500	Next race: 2021 Bommarito Automotive Group 500
