= 2020 Iowa IndyCar 250s =

(United States) 2020 Iowa Speedway
Race details
5th and 6th round of the 2020 IndyCar Series season
← Previous race	Next race →
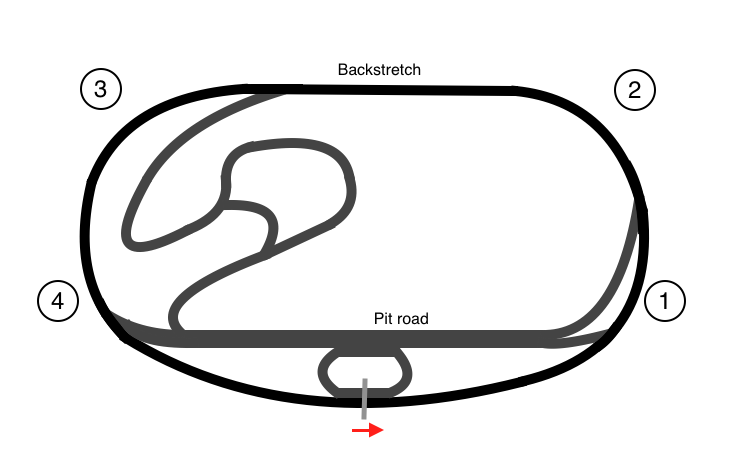
- Date: July 17 and 18, 2020
- Official name: Iowa IndyCar 250s
- Location: Iowa Speedway
- Course: Permanent racing facility 0.875 mi / 6.458 km
- Distance: 250 laps 218.75 mi / 352.044 km
Race 1

Pole position
- Driver: Conor Daly (Carlin)
- Time: 18.3711

Fastest lap
- Driver: (United States) (United States) Conor Daly
- Time: 18.9515 (on lap 3 of 250)

Podium
- First: (France) Simon Pagenaud
- Second: (New Zealand) Scott Dixon
- Third: (United States) Oliver Askew
Race 2

Pole position
- Driver: (United States) Josef Newgarden (Team Penske)
- Time: 18.3559

Fastest lap
- Driver: (United States) Josef Newgarden (Team Penske)
- Time: 19.1928 (on lap 4 of 250)

Podium
- First: (United States) Josef Newgarden (Team Penske)
- Second: (Australia) Will Power (Team Penske)
- Third: (United States) Graham Rahal (Rahal Letterman Lanigan Racing)

The 2020 Iowa IndyCar 250s was an IndyCar Series event that took place from July 17–18, 2020. It made up the fifth and sixth rounds of the series' 2020 season. The race was originally scheduled as a single race for July 18 for 300 laps, but due to the COVID-19 pandemic an additional race had to be added due to cancellations of other races so IndyCar officials made the weekend a doubleheader & shortened each race to 250 laps. The race was also the second event of the 2020 season to allow spectators at the track, however there were restrictions regarding attendance.

== Entry list ==
The entry list for both races were released by IndyCar on July 15 with separate entry lists for both races. The only difference between the two was the main sponsor for Graham Rahal.

Car No.	Driver Name	Owner/Team	Engine
1	(United States) Josef Newgarden W	Team Penske	Chevrolet
4	(United States) Charlie Kimball	A. J. Foyt Enterprises	Chevrolet
5	(Mexico) Patricio O'Ward	Arrow McLaren SP	Chevrolet
7	(United States) Oliver Askew R	Arrow McLaren SP	Chevrolet
8	(Sweden) Marcus Ericsson	Chip Ganassi Racing	Honda
9	(New Zealand) Scott Dixon	Chip Ganassi Racing	Honda
10	(Sweden) Felix Rosenqvist	Chip Ganassi Racing	Honda
12	(Australia) Will Power	Team Penske	Chevrolet
14	(Brazil) Tony Kanaan W	A. J. Foyt Enterprises	Chevrolet
15	(United States) Graham Rahal	Rahal Letterman Lanigan Racing	Honda
18	(United States) Santino Ferrucci	Dale Coyne Racing with Vasser-Sullivan	Honda
20	(United States) Ed Carpenter	Ed Carpenter Racing	Chevrolet
21	(Netherlands) Rinus VeeKay R	Ed Carpenter Racing	Chevrolet
22	(France) Simon Pagenaud	Team Penske	Chevrolet
26	(United States) Zach Veach	Andretti Autosport	Honda
27	(United States) Alexander Rossi	Andretti Autosport	Honda
28	(United States) Ryan Hunter-Reay W	Andretti Autosport	Honda
30	(Japan) Takuma Sato	Rahal Letterman Lanigan Racing	Honda
55	(Spain) Álex Palou R	Dale Coyne Racing with Team Goh	Honda
59	(United States) Conor Daly	Carlin	Chevrolet
60	(United Kingdom) Jack Harvey	Meyer Shank Racing	Honda
88	(United States) Colton Herta	Andretti Harding Steinbrenner Autosport	Honda
98	(United States) Marco Andretti W	Andretti Herta Autosport with Marco Andretti & Curb-Agajanian	Honda

All cars run a Dallara safety tub utilizing the IndyCar mandated Universal Aero Kit 18. All cars also will utilized Firestone tires.

Key	Meaning
R	Rookie
W	Past winner

== Pre-qualifying notes ==
Racer.com's Robin Miller reported on July 15 that after speaking with IndyCar officials that the qualifying procedure for Iowa would be modified. There would be 1 session of qualifying on July 17, however it would not be a 2 lap average to set the field as was usually done on short ovals, rather lap 1 would set the cars starting position for race 1 and lap 2 would set the cars starting position for race 2.

== Combined Qualifying Session, July 17 ==
Key	Meaning
R	Rookie
W	Past winner

Pos Race 1	Pos Race 2	No.	Name	Lap 1	Lap 2
1	3	59	(United States) Conor Daly	18.3711	18.3951
2	1	1	(United States) Josef Newgarden W	18.3796	18.3559
3	2	12	(Australia) Will Power	18.4112	18.3883
4	5	88	(United States) Colton Herta	18.4120	18.5566
5	21	27	(United States) Alexander Rossi	18.6831	19.0846
6	20	30	(Japan) Takuma Sato	18.6975	19.0242
7	10	10	(Sweden) Felix Rosenqvist	18.7048	18.7841
8	12	5	(Mexico) Patricio O'Ward	18.7534	18.8102
9	6	60	(United Kingdom) Jack Harvey	18.7540	18.6549
10	9	8	(Sweden) Marcus Ericsson	18.7666	18.7495
11	16	18	(United States) Santino Ferrucci	18.7837	18.8818
12	4	28	(United States) Ryan Hunter-Reay W	18.7905	18.4705
13	15	21	(Netherlands) Rinus VeeKay R	18.8205	18.8681
14	13	7	(United States) Oliver Askew R	18.8344	18.8244
15	11	4	(United States) Charlie Kimball	18.8412	18.7888
16	14	20	(United States) Ed Carpenter	18.8584	18.8434
17	18	9	(New Zealand) Scott Dixon	18.8631	18.9841
18	7	55	(Spain) Álex Palou R	18.8768	18.6702
19	8	14	(Brazil) Tony Kanaan W	18.8782	18.7297
20	17	98	(United States) Marco Andretti W	18.9951	18.8970
21	19	15	(United States) Graham Rahal	19.1109	19.0136
22	22	26	(United States) Zach Veach	19.4520	19.9487
23	23	22	(France) Simon Pagenaud	No Time	

== Race 1 – July 17 ==
All sessions for race 1 took place on Friday, July 17.

The aeroscreen had its first major test when during an aborted restart on lap 157, Ed Carpenter Racing's Rinus VeeKay appeared to slow behind eventual race winner Simon Pagenaud and move to the right, and behind the Dutch rookie, Andretti Harding Steinbrenner Racing's Colton Herta was caught in an accordion affect, launching the No. 88 Honda over the left-rear tire of VeeKay's No. 21 Chevy. Prior to getting significantly airborne, Herta's unimpeded nose – minus its wings – attempted to spear into the left side of VeeKay's cockpit, level with his helmet. With the aeroscreen acting as a vertical barrier, Herta's nose was forced upward, sliding skyward on the screen before hitting the top of the aeroscreen frame and flying over VeeKay's Dallara DW12 chassis. This saved Veekay from apparent serious injury.

=== Race ===
Pos	No.	Driver	Team	Engine	Laps	Time/Status	Pit Stops	Grid	Laps Led	Pts.^{1}
1	22	(France) Simon Pagenaud	Team Penske	Chevrolet	250	1:41:25.2939	12	23	83	53
2	9	(New Zealand) Scott Dixon	Chip Ganassi Racing	Honda	250	+0.495	12	17		40
3	7	(United States) Oliver Askew R	Arrow McLaren SP	Chevrolet	250	+7.212	13	14		35
4	5	(Mexico) Patricio O'Ward	Arrow McLaren SP	Chevrolet	250	+13.989	13	8	30	33
5	1	(United States) Josef Newgarden W	Team Penske	Chevrolet	250	+16.735	12	2	68	31
6	27	(United States) Alexander Rossi	Andretti Autosport	Honda	250	+19.600	13	5		28
7	60	(United Kingdom) Jack Harvey	Meyer Shank Racing	Honda	250	+20.048	13	9		26
8	59	(United States) Conor Daly	Carlin	Chevrolet	250	+20.534	13	1	13	26
9	8	(Sweden) Marcus Ericsson	Chip Ganassi Racing	Honda	250	+20.738	14	10		22
10	30	(Japan) Takuma Sato	Rahal Letterman Lanigan Racing	Honda	249	+1 Lap	13	6	49	21
11	55	(Spain) Álex Palou R	Dale Coyne Racing w/Team Goh	Honda	249	+1 Lap	12	18		19
12	15	(United States) Graham Rahal	Rahal Letterman Lanigan Racing	Honda	248	+2 Laps	14	21		18
13	18	(United States) Santino Ferrucci	Dale Coyne Racing w/Vasser-Sullivan	Honda	247	+3 Laps	14	11		17
14	10	(Sweden) Felix Rosenqvist	Chip Ganassi Racing	Honda	247	+3 Laps	14	7	7	17
15	20	(United States) Ed Carpenter	Ed Carpenter Racing	Chevrolet	247	+3 Laps	14	16		15
16	28	(United States) Ryan Hunter-Reay W	Andretti Autosport	Honda	247	+3 Laps	13	12		14
17	4	(United States) Charlie Kimball	A. J. Foyt Enterprises	Chevrolet	245	+5 Laps	13	15		13
18	14	(Brazil) Tony Kanaan W	A. J. Foyt Enterprises	Chevrolet	213	In Pits	13	19		12
19	21	(Netherlands) Rinus VeeKay R	Ed Carpenter Racing	Chevrolet	156	Contact	3	13		11
20	88	(United States) Colton Herta	Andretti Harding Steinbrenner Autosport	Honda	156	Contact	2	4		10
21	12	(Australia) Will Power	Team Penske	Chevrolet	142	Contact	3	3		9
22	98	(United States) Marco Andretti W	Andretti Herta Autosport w/Marco Andretti and Curb-Agajanian	Honda	128	Mechanical	2	20		8
23	26	(United States) Zach Veach	Andretti Autosport	Honda	95	Mechanical	2	22		7
Official Box Score

Notes: ^{1} Points include 1 point for leading at least 1 lap during a race, an additional 2 points for leading the most race laps, and 1 point for Pole Position.

=== Race statistics ===
Lead changes: 7

Lap leader breakdown
From lap	To lap	Total laps	Driver
1	13	13	Conor Daly
14	70	57	Josef Newgarden
71	77	7	Felix Rosenqvist
78	126	49	Takuma Sato
127	137	11	Josef Newgarden
138	147	10	Simon Pagenaud
148	177	30	Patricio O'Ward
178	250	73	Simon Pagenaud

Cautions:1 for 26 laps
From lap	To lap	Total laps	Reason
144	169	26	Accident car #12 (Power) turn 4; then during aborted restart contact cars #21 (VeeKay) and #88 (Herta) front straight

Average speed: 132.220 mph (212.787 km/h)

=== Championship standings after the race ===
Drivers' Championship standings

	Pos	Driver	Points
	1	(New Zealand) Scott Dixon	213
1	2	(France) Simon Pagenaud	163
1	3	(Mexico) Patricio O'Ward	143
1	4	(United States) Josef Newgarden	137
3	5	(United States) Colton Herta	130

Engine Manufacturer standings

Pos	Manufacturer	Points
1	Honda	430
2	Chevrolet	361

- Note: Only the top five positions are included.

== Race 2 – July 18 ==
All sessions for race 2 (except qualifying) took place on Saturday, July 18.

=== Race ===
Pos	No.	Driver	Team	Engine	Laps	Time/Status	Pit Stops	Grid	Laps Led	Pts.^{1}
1	1	(United States) Josef Newgarden W	Team Penske	Chevrolet	250	1:38:40.5189	3	1	214	54
2	12	(Australia) Will Power	Team Penske	Chevrolet	250	+2.786	3	2	2	41
3	15	(United States) Graham Rahal	Rahal Letterman Lanigan Racing	Honda	250	+3.564	3	19	13	36
4	22	(France) Simon Pagenaud W	Team Penske	Chevrolet	250	+6.124	4	23		32
5	9	(New Zealand) Scott Dixon	Chip Ganassi Racing	Honda	250	+6.575	4	18	2	31
6	7	(United States) Oliver Askew R	Arrow McLaren SP	Chevrolet	250	+16.000	3	13	10	29
7	60	(United Kingdom) Jack Harvey	Meyer Shank Racing	Honda	250	+16.618	4	6		26
8	27	(United States) Alexander Rossi	Andretti Autosport	Honda	250	+17.886	3	21		24
9	8	(Sweden) Marcus Ericsson	Chip Ganassi Racing	Honda	250	+18.520	4	9		22
10	98	(United States) Marco Andretti W	Andretti Herta Autosport w/Marco Andretti and Curb-Agajanian	Honda	250	+20.017	4	17		20
11	14	(Brazil) Tony Kanaan W	A. J. Foyt Enterprises	Chevrolet	250	+20.742	4	8		19
12	5	(Mexico) Patricio O'Ward	Arrow McLaren SP	Chevrolet	249	+1 Lap	3	12	1	19
13	59	(United States) Conor Daly	Carlin	Chevrolet	249	+1 Lap	4	3	4	18
14	55	(Spain) Álex Palou R	Dale Coyne Racing w/Team Goh	Honda	249	+1 Lap	3	7		16
15	10	(Sweden) Felix Rosenqvist	Chip Ganassi Racing	Honda	248	+2 Laps	3	10		15
16	4	(United States) Charlie Kimball	A. J. Foyt Enterprises	Chevrolet	248	+2 Laps	4	11		14
17	21	(Netherlands) Rinus VeeKay R	Ed Carpenter Racing	Chevrolet	248	+2 Laps	3	15		13
18	18	(United States) Santino Ferrucci	Dale Coyne Racing w/Vasser-Sullivan	Honda	247	+3 Laps	5	16		12
19	88	(United States) Colton Herta	Andretti Harding Steinbrenner Autosport	Honda	247	+3 Laps	6	5		11
20	26	(United States) Zach Veach	Andretti Autosport	Honda	247	+3 Laps	3	22		10
21	30	(Japan) Takuma Sato	Rahal Letterman Lanigan Racing	Honda	247	+3 Laps	5	20		9
22	28	(United States) Ryan Hunter-Reay W	Andretti Autosport	Honda	178	Contact	4	4	4	9
23	20	(United States) Ed Carpenter	Ed Carpenter Racing	Chevrolet	112	Contact	2	14		7
Official Box Score

Notes: ^{1} Points include 1 point for leading at least 1 lap during a race, an additional 2 points for leading the most race laps, and 1 point for Pole Position.

=== Race statistics ===
Lead changes: 12

Lap leader breakdown
From lap	To lap	Total laps	Driver
1	56	56	Josef Newgarden
57	58	2	Will Power
59	60	2	Scott Dixon
61	62	2	Graham Rahal
63	106	44	Josef Newgarden
107	107	1	Patricio O'Ward
108	111	4	Conor Daly
112	119	8	Graham Rahal
120	171	52	Josef Newgarden
172	174	3	Graham Rahal
175	178	4	Ryan Hunter-Reay
179	188	10	Oliver Askew
189	250	62	Josef Newgarden

Cautions:2 for 24 laps
From lap	To lap	Total laps	Reason
114	125	12	Accident car #20 (Carpenter) turn 2
180	191	12	Accident car #28 (Hunter-Reay) turn 2

Average speed: 135.900 mph (218.710 km/h)

=== Championship standings after the race ===
Drivers' Championship standings

	Pos	Driver	Points
	1	(New Zealand) Scott Dixon	244
	2	(France) Simon Pagenaud	195
1	3	(United States) Josef Newgarden	191
1	4	(Mexico) Patricio O'Ward	162
5	5	(Australia) Will Power	142

Engine Manufacturer standings

Pos	Manufacturer	Points
1	Honda	495
2	Chevrolet	457

- Note: Only the top five positions are included.

Previous race: 2020 REV Group Grand Prix	IndyCar Series; 2020 season	Next race: 104th Running of the Indianapolis 500 Presented by Gainbridge
Previous race: 2019 Iowa 300	Iowa IndyCar 250s	Next race: 2022 Hy-Vee IndyCar Race Weekend
