= 2020 Honda Indy 200 =

(United States) 2020 Honda Indy 200
Race details
10th and 11th round of the 2020 IndyCar Series season
← Previous race	Next race →
- Date: September 12–13, 2020
- Official name: Honda Indy 200 at Mid-Ohio
- Location: Mid-Ohio Sports Car Course; Lexington, Ohio, United States
- Course: Permanent racing facility 2.258 mi / 3.634 km
- Distance: Both 75 laps 169.350 mi / 272.542 km
Race 1

Pole position
- Driver: (Australia) Will Power (Team Penske)
- Time: 01:06.3343

Fastest lap
- Driver: (Mexico) Pato O'Ward (Arrow McLaren)
- Time: 01:08:3982 (on lap 22 of 75)

Podium
- First: (Australia) Will Power (Team Penske)
- Second: (United States) Josef Newgarden (Team Penske)
- Third: (United States) Alexander Rossi (Andretti Global)
Race 2

Pole position
- Driver: (United States) Colton Herta (Andretti Harding Steinbrenner Autosport)
- Time: 01:26.2788

Fastest lap
- Driver: (New Zealand) Scott Dixon (Chip Ganassi Racing)
- Time: 01:08.3089 (on lap 65 of 75)

Podium
- First: (United States) Colton Herta (Andretti Harding Steinbrenner Autosport)
- Second: (United States) Alexander Rossi (Andretti Autosport)
- Third: (United States) Ryan Hunter-Reay (Andretti Autosport)

Chronology
Previous	Next
2019	2021

The 2020 Honda Indy 200 was a pair of IndyCar motor races held on September 12, 2020, and September 13, 2020, at Mid-Ohio Sports Car Course in Lexington, Ohio. They were the 10th and 11th rounds of the 2020 IndyCar Series season. Both races were contested of 75 laps.

The race was originally scheduled to be held on August 16, but was later moved up to August 9. However, it was later postponed due to the COVID-19 pandemic. Additionally, the race was held as a doubleheader event to make up for cancelled races at Portland and Laguna Seca.

The first race was held on September 12, 2020. Will Power won the pole and led all but 9 laps en route to the win. Josef Newgarden finished 2nd, and Alexander Rossi finished 3rd. Graham Rahal and Ryan Hunter-Reay rounded out the top five, and Felix Rosenqvist, Jack Harvey, Rinus VeeKay, Colton Herta, and Scott Dixon rounded out the top ten.

The second race was held on September 13, 2020. Colton Herta won the pole and the race. Alexander Rossi finished 2nd, and Ryan Hunter-Reay finished 3rd, marking a podium sweep for Andretti Autosport for the first time since 2005. Graham Rahal and Marcus Ericsson rounded out the top five, and Simon Pagenaud, Will Power, Josef Newgarden, Pato O'Ward, and Scott Dixon rounded out the top ten.

== Race 1 – September 12 ==
=== Entry list ===
Key	Meaning
R	Rookie
W	Past winner

No.	Driver	Team	Engine
1	(United States) Josef Newgarden W	Team Penske	Chevrolet
4	(United States) Charlie Kimball W	A. J. Foyt Enterprises	Chevrolet
5	(Mexico) Pato O'Ward	Arrow McLaren SP	Chevrolet
7	(United States) Oliver Askew R	Arrow McLaren SP	Chevrolet
8	(Sweden) Marcus Ericsson	Chip Ganassi Racing	Honda
9	(New Zealand) Scott Dixon W	Chip Ganassi Racing	Honda
10	(Sweden) Felix Rosenqvist	Chip Ganassi Racing	Honda
12	(Australia) Will Power	Team Penske	Chevrolet
14	(Canada) Dalton Kellett R	A. J. Foyt Enterprises	Chevrolet
15	(United States) Graham Rahal W	Rahal Letterman Lanigan Racing	Honda
18	(United States) Santino Ferrucci	Dale Coyne Racing with Vasser Sullivan	Honda
20	(United States) Conor Daly	Ed Carpenter Racing	Chevrolet
21	(Netherlands) Rinus VeeKay R	Ed Carpenter Racing	Chevrolet
22	(France) Simon Pagenaud W	Team Penske	Chevrolet
26	(United States) Zach Veach	Andretti Autosport	Honda
27	(United States) Alexander Rossi W	Andretti Autosport	Honda
28	(United States) Ryan Hunter-Reay	Andretti Autosport	Honda
30	(Japan) Takuma Sato	Rahal Letterman Lanigan Racing	Honda
55	(Spain) Álex Palou R	Dale Coyne Racing with Team Goh	Honda
59	(United Kingdom) Max Chilton	Carlin	Chevrolet
60	(United Kingdom) Jack Harvey	Meyer Shank Racing	Honda
88	(United States) Colton Herta	Andretti Harding Steinbrenner Autosport	Honda
98	(United States) Marco Andretti	Andretti Herta Autosport w/ Marco Andretti & Curb-Agajanian	Honda

=== Practice ===
Practice was held at 10:45 AM ET on September 12, 2020.

Top Practice Speeds
Pos	No.	Driver	Team	Engine	Lap Time
1	28	(United States) Ryan Hunter-Reay	Andretti Autosport	Honda	01:06.3034
2	12	(Australia) Will Power	Team Penske	Chevrolet	01:06.3952
3	27	(United States) Alexander Rossi W	Andretti Autosport	Honda	01:06.4299
Practice results

=== Qualifying ===
Qualifying was held at 2:00 PM ET on September 12, 2020. As the event was doubleheader, series rules meant qualifying was a single round (instead of two rounds as normal), split into two groups. Drivers from the group with the fastest driver having the better time started in the odd number positions, while the group whose fastest time was worse than the other group took even number positions.

==== Qualifying classification ====
Pos	No.	Driver	Team	Engine	Group	Time	Final grid
1	12	(Australia) Will Power	Team Penske	Chevrolet	1	1:06.3343	1
2	28	(United States) Ryan Hunter-Reay	Andretti Autosport	Honda	2	1:06.7287	2
3	1	(United States) Josef Newgarden W	Team Penske	Chevrolet	1	1:06.5508	3
4	20	(United States) Conor Daly	Ed Carpenter Racing	Chevrolet	2	1:06.8761	4
5	60	(United Kingdom) Jack Harvey	Meyer Shank Racing	Honda	1	1:06.7690	5
6	27	(United States) Alexander Rossi W	Andretti Autosport	Honda	2	1:07.1856	6
7	10	(Sweden) Felix Rosenqvist	Chip Ganassi Racing	Honda	1	1:06.7841	7
8	15	(United States) Graham Rahal	Rahal Letterman Lanigan Racing	Honda	2	1:07.2205	8
9	21	(Netherlands) Rinus VeeKay R	Ed Carpenter Racing	Chevrolet	1	1:07.0110	9
10	22	(France) Simon Pagenaud W	Team Penske	Chevrolet	2	1:07.2489	10
11	98	(United States) Marco Andretti	Andretti Herta Autosport w/ Marco Andretti & Curb-Agajanian	Honda	1	1:07.0162	11
12	59	(United Kingdom) Max Chilton	Carlin	Chevrolet	2	1:07.4491	12
13	88	(United States) Colton Herta	Andretti Harding Steinbrenner Autosport	Honda	1	1:07.0212	13
14	18	(United States) Santino Ferrucci	Dale Coyne Racing w/ Vasser Sullivan	Honda	2	1:07.5011	14
15	5	(Mexico) Pato O'Ward	Arrow McLaren SP	Chevrolet	1	1:07.0354	15
16	7	(United States) Oliver Askew R	Arrow McLaren SP	Chevrolet	2	1:07.6211	16
17	9	(New Zealand) Scott Dixon W	Chip Ganassi Racing	Honda	1	1:07.1406	17
18	30	(Japan) Takuma Sato	Rahal Letterman Lanigan Racing	Honda	2	1:07.8192	18
19	26	(United States) Zach Veach	Andretti Autosport	Honda	1	1:07.2101	19
20	55	(Spain) Álex Palou R	Dale Coyne Racing w/ Team Goh	Honda	2	1:08.1548	20
21	8	(Sweden) Marcus Ericsson	Chip Ganassi Racing	Honda	1	1:07.3890	21
22	4	(United States) Charlie Kimball W	A. J. Foyt Enterprises	Chevrolet	2	1:08.3783	22
23	14	(Canada) Dalton Kellett R	A. J. Foyt Enterprises	Chevrolet	2	1:08.5442	23
Qualifying results

=== Race ===
The race was held at 5:00 PM ET on September 12, 2020.

==== Race classification ====
Pos	No.	Driver	Team	Engine	Laps	Time/Retired	Pit Stops	Grid	Laps Led	Pts.
1	12	(Australia) Will Power	Team Penske	Chevrolet	75	01:29:08.9095	2	1	66	54
2	1	(United States) Josef Newgarden W	Team Penske	Chevrolet	75	+7.4523	2	3	0	40
3	27	(United States) Alexander Rossi W	Andretti Autosport	Honda	75	+8.9922	2	6	5	36
4	15	(United States) Graham Rahal W	Rahal Letterman Lanigan Racing	Honda	75	+9.2323	2	8	0	32
5	28	(United States) Ryan Hunter-Reay	Andretti Autosport	Honda	75	+13.2281	2	2	0	31
6	10	(Sweden) Felix Rosenqvist	Chip Ganassi Racing	Honda	75	+14.1171	2	7	0	28
7	60	(United Kingdom) Jack Harvey	Meyer Shank Racing	Honda	75	+18.2198	2	5	0	26
8	21	(Netherlands) Rinus VeeKay R	Ed Carpenter Racing	Chevrolet	75	+19.2468	2	9	0	24
9	88	(United States) Colton Herta	Andretti Harding Steinbrenner Autosport	Honda	75	+26.0264	2	13	4	23
10	9	(New Zealand) Scott Dixon W	Chip Ganassi Racing	Honda	75	+32.7179	2	17	0	20
11	5	(Mexico) Pato O'Ward	Arrow McLaren SP	Chevrolet	75	+33.6137	2	15	0	19
12	55	(Spain) Álex Palou R	Dale Coyne Racing w/ Team Goh	Honda	75	+34.4767	2	20	0	18
13	20	(United States) Conor Daly	Ed Carpenter Racing	Chevrolet	75	+39.3069	2	4	0	17
14	18	(United States) Santino Ferrucci	Dale Coyne Racing w/ Vasser Sullivan	Honda	75	+42.9962	2	14	0	16
15	8	(Sweden) Marcus Ericsson	Chip Ganassi Racing	Honda	75	+43.6952	2	21	0	15
16	59	(United Kingdom) Max Chilton	Carlin	Chevrolet	75	+44.4717	2	12	0	14
17	30	(Japan) Takuma Sato	Rahal Letterman Lanigan Racing	Honda	75	+45.8415	2	18	0	13
18	22	(France) Simon Pagenaud W	Team Penske	Chevrolet	75	+46.2387	2	10	0	12
19	7	(United States) Oliver Askew R	Arrow McLaren SP	Chevrolet	75	+1:08.4106	2	16	0	11
20	26	(United States) Zach Veach	Andretti Autosport	Honda	74	+1 Lap	2	19	0	10
21	4	(United States) Charlie Kimball W	A. J. Foyt Enterprises	Chevrolet	74	+1 Lap	2	22	0	9
22	14	(Canada) Dalton Kellett R	A. J. Foyt Enterprises	Chevrolet	74	+1 Lap	2	23	0	8
23	98	(United States) Marco Andretti	Andretti Herta Autosport w/ Marco Andretti & Curb-Agajanian	Honda	74	+1 Lap	2	11	0	7
Fastest lap: (Mexico) Pato O'Ward (Arrow McLaren SP) - 1:08.3982 (Lap 22)
Official race results

=== Championship standings after the race ===
Drivers' Championship standings

	Pos.	Driver	Points
	1	(New Zealand) Scott Dixon	436
	2	(United States) Josef Newgarden	360 (–76)
	3	(Mexico) Pato O'Ward	316 (–120)
	4	(Japan) Takuma Sato	287 (–149)
3	5	(Australia) Will Power	280 (–156)

== Race 2 – September 13 ==
=== Entry list ===
Key	Meaning
R	Rookie
W	Past winner

No.	Driver	Team	Engine
1	(United States) Josef Newgarden W	Team Penske	Chevrolet
4	(United States) Charlie Kimball W	A. J. Foyt Enterprises	Chevrolet
5	(Mexico) Pato O'Ward	Arrow McLaren SP	Chevrolet
7	(United States) Oliver Askew R	Arrow McLaren SP	Chevrolet
8	(Sweden) Marcus Ericsson	Chip Ganassi Racing	Honda
9	(New Zealand) Scott Dixon W	Chip Ganassi Racing	Honda
10	(Sweden) Felix Rosenqvist	Chip Ganassi Racing	Honda
12	(Australia) Will Power W	Team Penske	Chevrolet
14	(Canada) Dalton Kellett R	A. J. Foyt Enterprises	Chevrolet
15	(United States) Graham Rahal W	Rahal Letterman Lanigan Racing	Honda
18	(United States) Santino Ferrucci	Dale Coyne Racing with Vasser Sullivan	Honda
20	(United States) Conor Daly	Ed Carpenter Racing	Chevrolet
21	(Netherlands) Rinus VeeKay R	Ed Carpenter Racing	Chevrolet
22	(France) Simon Pagenaud W	Team Penske	Chevrolet
26	(United States) Zach Veach	Andretti Autosport	Honda
27	(United States) Alexander Rossi W	Andretti Autosport	Honda
28	(United States) Ryan Hunter-Reay	Andretti Autosport	Honda
30	(Japan) Takuma Sato	Rahal Letterman Lanigan Racing	Honda
55	(Spain) Álex Palou R	Dale Coyne Racing with Team Goh	Honda
59	(United Kingdom) Max Chilton	Carlin	Chevrolet
60	(United Kingdom) Jack Harvey	Meyer Shank Racing	Honda
88	(United States) Colton Herta	Andretti Harding Steinbrenner Autosport	Honda
98	(United States) Marco Andretti	Andretti Herta Autosport w/ Marco Andretti & Curb-Agajanian	Honda

=== Qualifying ===
Qualifying was held at 10:15 AM ET on September 13, 2020.

==== Qualifying classification ====
Pos	No.	Driver	Team	Engine	Group	Time	Final grid
1	88	(United States) Colton Herta	Andretti Harding Steinbrenner Autosport	Honda	2	1:26.2788	1
2	18	(United States) Santino Ferrucci	Dale Coyne Racing w/ Vasser Sullivan	Honda	1	1:27.4688	2
3	9	(New Zealand) Scott Dixon W	Chip Ganassi Racing	Honda	2	1:27.0991	3
4	55	(Spain) Álex Palou R	Dale Coyne Racing w/ Team Goh	Honda	1	1:30.7107	4
5	10	(Sweden) Felix Rosenqvist	Chip Ganassi Racing	Honda	2	1:27.1414	5
6	22	(France) Simon Pagenaud W	Team Penske	Chevrolet	1	1:31.7359	6
7	98	(United States) Marco Andretti	Andretti Herta Autosport w/ Marco Andretti & Curb-Agajanian	Honda	2	1:27.4608	7
8	28	(United States) Ryan Hunter-Reay	Andretti Autosport	Honda	1	1:31.9096	8
9	1	(United States) Josef Newgarden W	Team Penske	Chevrolet	2	1:28.4174	9
10	27	(United States) Alexander Rossi W	Andretti Autosport	Honda	1	1:32.7010	10
11	21	(Netherlands) Rinus VeeKay R	Ed Carpenter Racing	Chevrolet	2	1:29.0355	11
12	15	(United States) Graham Rahal	Rahal Letterman Lanigan Racing	Honda	1	1:33.1620	12
13	26	(United States) Zach Veach	Andretti Autosport	Honda	2	1:29.2354	13
14	7	(United States) Oliver Askew R	Arrow McLaren SP	Chevrolet	1	1:33.4681	14
15	8	(Sweden) Marcus Ericsson	Chip Ganassi Racing	Honda	2	1:30.2652	15
16	20	(United States) Conor Daly	Ed Carpenter Racing	Chevrolet	1	1:34.3343	16
17	12	(Australia) Will Power W	Team Penske	Chevrolet	2	—N/a	17
18	59	(United Kingdom) Max Chilton	Carlin	Chevrolet	1	1:35.0273	18
19	60	(United Kingdom) Jack Harvey	Meyer Shank Racing	Honda	2	—N/a	19
20	14	(Canada) Dalton Kellett R	A. J. Foyt Enterprises	Chevrolet	1	1:35.0781	20
21	5	(Mexico) Pato O'Ward	Arrow McLaren SP	Chevrolet	2	—N/a	21
22	30	(Japan) Takuma Sato	Rahal Letterman Lanigan Racing	Honda	1	1:39.8092	22
23	4	(United States) Charlie Kimball W	A. J. Foyt Enterprises	Chevrolet	1	—N/a	23
Qualifying results

=== Race ===
The race was held at 1:00 PM ET on September 13, 2020.

==== Race classification ====
Pos	No.	Driver	Team	Engine	Laps	Time/Retired	Pit Stops	Grid	Laps Led	Pts.
1	88	(United States) Colton Herta	Andretti Harding Steinbrenner Autosport	Honda	75	01:34:17.3968	2	1	57	54
2	27	(United States) Alexander Rossi W	Andretti Autosport	Honda	75	+1.3826	2	10	0	40
3	28	(United States) Ryan Hunter-Reay	Andretti Autosport	Honda	75	+2.4965	2	8	0	35
4	15	(United States) Graham Rahal W	Rahal Letterman Lanigan Racing	Honda	75	+3.0853	2	12	1	33
5	8	(Sweden) Marcus Ericsson	Chip Ganassi Racing	Honda	75	+9.9175	2	15	1	31
6	22	(France) Simon Pagenaud W	Team Penske	Chevrolet	75	+14.1918	2	6	0	28
7	12	(Australia) Will Power W	Team Penske	Chevrolet	75	+15.3292	2	17	0	26
8	1	(United States) Josef Newgarden W	Team Penske	Chevrolet	75	+17.2532	2	9	0	24
9	5	(Mexico) Pato O'Ward	Arrow McLaren SP	Chevrolet	75	+22.9474	3	21	0	22
10	9	(New Zealand) Scott Dixon W	Chip Ganassi Racing	Honda	75	+30.5093	3	3	0	20
11	21	(Netherlands) Rinus VeeKay R	Ed Carpenter Racing	Chevrolet	75	+31.7181	2	11	0	19
12	60	(United Kingdom) Jack Harvey	Meyer Shank Racing	Honda	75	+36.7526	2	19	0	18
13	59	(United Kingdom) Max Chilton	Carlin	Chevrolet	75	+37.6521	2	18	0	17
14	18	(United States) Santino Ferrucci	Dale Coyne Racing w/ Vasser Sullivan	Honda	75	+46.5834	4	2	0	17
15	7	(United States) Oliver Askew R	Arrow McLaren SP	Chevrolet	75	+47.3665	2	14	0	15
16	20	(United States) Conor Daly	Ed Carpenter Racing	Chevrolet	75	+1:00.7058	2	16	0	14
17	26	(United States) Zach Veach	Andretti Autosport	Honda	75	+1:02.6716	2	13	0	13
18	30	(Japan) Takuma Sato	Rahal Letterman Lanigan Racing	Honda	75	+1:05.2570	2	22	16	13
19	4	(United States) Charlie Kimball W	A. J. Foyt Enterprises	Chevrolet	75	+1:06.2089	3	23	0	11
20	98	(United States) Marco Andretti	Andretti Herta Autosport w/ Marco Andretti & Curb-Agajanian	Honda	74	+1 Lap	2	7	0	10
21	14	(Canada) Dalton Kellett R	A. J. Foyt Enterprises	Chevrolet	71	+4 Laps	2	20	0	9
22	10	(Sweden) Felix Rosenqvist	Chip Ganassi Racing	Honda	4	Contact	0	5	0	8
23	55	(Spain) Álex Palou R	Dale Coyne Racing w/ Team Goh	Honda	2	Contact	0	4	0	7
Fastest lap: (New Zealand) Scott Dixon (Chip Ganassi Racing) - 1:08.3089 (Lap 65)
Official race results

=== Championship standings after the race ===
Drivers' Championship standings

	Pos.	Driver	Points
	1	(New Zealand) Scott Dixon	456
	2	(United States) Josef Newgarden	384 (–72)
	3	(Mexico) Pato O'Ward	338 (–118)
2	4	(United States) Colton Herta	327 (–129)
	5	(Australia) Will Power	306 (–150)

Previous race: 2020 Bommarito Automotive Group 500	IndyCar Series; 2020 season	Next race: 2020 Harvest Grand Prix
Previous race: 2019 Honda Indy 200	Indy 200 at Mid-Ohio	Next race: 2021 Honda Indy 200
