= 2020 Firestone Grand Prix of St. Petersburg =

(United States) 2020 Firestone Grand Prix of St. Petersburg
Race details
14th round of the 2020 IndyCar Series season
← Previous race
- Date: October 25, 2020
- Official name: Grand Prix of St. Petersburg
- Location: Streets of St. Petersburg
- Course: Temporary street circuit 1.800 mi / 2.897 km
- Distance: 100 laps 180.000 mi / 289.682 km

Pole position
- Driver: (Australia) Will Power (Team Penske)
- Time: 01:01.0369

Fastest lap
- Driver: (New Zealand) Marcus Ericsson (Chip Ganassi Racing)
- Time: 1:01.2384 (on lap 93 of 100)

Podium
- First: (United States) Josef Newgarden (Team Penske)
- Second: (Mexico) Pato O'Ward (Arrow McLaren SP)
- Third: (New Zealand) Scott Dixon (Chip Ganassi Racing)

Chronology
Previous	Next
2019	2021

The 2020 Firestone Grand Prix of St. Petersburg was IndyCar Series event held on October 25, 2020. It made up the fourteenth and final round of the series' 2020 season. Will Power won pole for the race with Josef Newgarden taking victory. Scott Dixon finished third to secure his sixth IndyCar Series Championship, holding off Newgarden by 16 points.

== Background ==
In a season shortened by the COVID-19 pandemic, the new Roger Penske-led IndyCar was forced to move the St. Petersburg Grand Prix from the season opener to the season finale. The race proved to be a championship-deciding showdown between Scott Dixon and Josef Newgarden, the latter of which won the 2019 race and the former never having won at St. Petersburg. Dixon had to finish ninth or better to win the championship, while Newgarden had to both win the race and finish at least nine positions better than Dixon to clinch the championship.

=== Entrants ===
Team Penske announced that Scott McLaughlin, then the two-time reigning champion and active championship leader of Supercars Championship would make his IndyCar Series debut in the #3 car at St. Petersburg in the season finale. He became the first driver to drive the #3 car other than Hélio Castroneves since Will Power subbed for Castroneves at St. Pete on April 15, 2009. Leading up to the race, Penske confirmed McLaughlin would compete in IndyCar full-time in 2021 as the team expanded to four cars.

Key	Meaning
R	Rookie
W	Past winner

No.	Driver	Team	Engine
1	(United States) Josef Newgarden W	Team Penske	Chevrolet
3	(New Zealand) Scott McLaughlin R	Team Penske	Chevrolet
4	(United States) Charlie Kimball	A. J. Foyt Enterprises	Chevrolet
5	(Mexico) Pato O'Ward	Arrow McLaren SP	Chevrolet
7	(Brazil) Oliver Askew	Arrow McLaren SP	Chevrolet
8	(Sweden) Marcus Ericsson	Chip Ganassi Racing	Honda
9	(New Zealand) Scott Dixon	Chip Ganassi Racing	Honda
10	(Sweden) Felix Rosenqvist	Chip Ganassi Racing	Honda
12	(Australia) Will Power W	Team Penske	Chevrolet
14	(France) Sébastien Bourdais W	A. J. Foyt Enterprises	Chevrolet
15	(United States) Graham Rahal	Rahal Letterman Lanigan Racing	Honda
18	(United States) Santino Ferrucci	Dale Coyne Racing with Vasser-Sullivan	Honda
20	(United States) Conor Daly	Ed Carpenter Racing	Chevrolet
21	(Netherlands) Rinus VeeKay R	Ed Carpenter Racing	Chevrolet
22	(France) Simon Pagenaud	Team Penske	Chevrolet
26	(Canada) James Hinchcliffe W	Andretti Autosport	Honda
27	(United States) Alexander Rossi	Andretti Autosport	Honda
28	(United States) Ryan Hunter-Reay	Andretti Autosport	Honda
30	(Japan) Takuma Sato	Rahal Letterman Lanigan Racing	Honda
55	(Spain) Álex Palou R	Dale Coyne Racing with Team Goh	Honda
59	(United Kingdom) Max Chilton	Carlin	Chevrolet
60	(United Kingdom) Jack Harvey	Meyer Shank Racing	Honda
88	(United States) Colton Herta	Andretti Harding Steinbrenner Autosport	Honda
98	(United States) Marco Andretti	Andretti Herta Autosport w/ Marco Andretti & Curb-Agajanian	Honda

== Practice ==
A single practice session was held on Saturday, October 24 at 10:55 AM ET.

Top Practice Speeds
Pos	No.	Driver	Team	Engine	Lap Time
1	88	(United States) Colton Herta	Andretti Harding Steinbrenner Autosport	Honda	01:01.1306
2	26	(Canada) James Hinchcliffe	Andretti Autosport	Honda	01:01.2279
3	55	(Spain) Álex Palou R	Dale Coyne Racing with Team Goh	Honda	01:10.3857

== Qualifying ==
=== Qualifying classification ===
Qualifying began at 3:05 PM ET on Saturday, October 24th. The field was split into two groups of twelve drivers, with the top 6 of each group progressing to the Fast 12. The top 6 of the Fast 12 proceeded to the Firestone Fast 6.

Pos	No.	Driver	Team	Engine	Time	Final grid							
Pos	No.	Driver	Team	Engine	Time	Final grid	1	12	(Australia) Will Power	Team Penske	Chevrolet	01:01.0369	1
Pos	No.	Driver	Team	Engine	Time	Final grid	2	27	(United States) Alexander Rossi	Andretti Autosport	Honda	01:01.1730	2
3	88	(United States) Colton Herta	Andretti Harding Steinbrenner Autosport	Honda	01:01.1815	3							

== Race ==
Josef Newgarden won his fourth race of the season from eighth place on the grid, while Scott Dixon finished third to secure his sixth IndyCar Series Championship. Although Penske's Will Power qualified for a record ninth pole at St. Petersburg, it was Andretti Autosport's Alexander Rossi who led most of the race before he suffered an unforced error and crashed into the walls. In the final stint, Newgarden managed to pass Pato O'Ward for the race lead, forcing the normally calm Dixon to drive aggressively into third position and finish there to win his sixth IndyCar championship.

=== Race classification ===
Pos	No.	Driver	Team	Engine	Laps	Time/Retired	Pit Stops	Grid	Laps Led	Pts.
1	1	(United States) Josef Newgarden	Team Penske	Chevrolet	100	2:06:12.5948	2	8	21	51
2	5	(Mexico) Pato O'Ward	Arrow McLaren SP	Chevrolet	100	2:06:16.7357	2	6	-	40
3	9	(New Zealand) Scott Dixon	Chip Ganassi Racing	Honda	100	2:06:18.7509	2	11	-	35
4	14	(France) Sébastien Bourdais	A. J. Foyt Enterprises	Chevrolet	100	2:06:20.0080	3	7	-	32
5	28	(United States) Ryan Hunter-Reay	Andretti Autosport	Honda	100	2:06:22.3477	2	19	-	30
6	22	(France) Simon Pagenaud	Team Penske	Chevrolet	100	2:06:23.1721	2	12	-	28
7	8	(Sweden) Marcus Ericsson	Chip Ganassi Racing	Honda	100	2:06:23.6644	3	15	-	26
8	4	(United States) Charlie Kimball	A. J. Foyt Enterprises	Chevrolet	100	2:06:28.4528	2	20	-	24
9	15	(United States) Graham Rahal	Rahal Letterman Lanigan Racing	Honda	100	2:06:28.9691	2	17	2	23
10	30	(Japan) Takuma Sato	Rahal Letterman Lanigan Racing	Honda	100	2:06:29.3696	2	13	-	20
11	88	(United States) Colton Herta	Andretti Harding Steinbrenner Autosport	Honda	100	2:06:36.8097	2	3	9	20
12	59	(United Kingdom) Max Chilton	Carlin	Chevrolet	100	2:06:43.0672	3	24	-	18
13	55	(Spain) Álex Palou R	Dale Coyne Racing with Team Goh	Honda	100	2:06:56.1739	5	16	1	18
14	26	(Canada) James Hinchcliffe	Andretti Autosport	Honda	100	2:07:16.6609	4	4	2	17
15	21	(Netherlands) Rinus VeeKay R	Ed Carpenter Racing	Chevrolet	98	+2 Laps	4	9	-	15
16	7	(United States) Oliver Askew	Arrow McLaren SP	Chevrolet	98	+2 Laps	3	10	-	14
17	20	(United States) Conor Daly	Ed Carpenter Racing	Chevrolet	98	+2 Laps	5	14	-	13
18	10	(Sweden) Felix Rosenqvist	Chip Ganassi Racing	Honda	98	+2 Laps	5	22	-	12
19	60	(United Kingdom) Jack Harvey	Meyer Shank Racing	Honda	97	+3 Laps	3	5	-	11
20	98	(United States) Marco Andretti	Andretti Herta Autosport w/ Marco Andretti & Curb-Agajanian	Honda	74	Contact	3	23	-	10
21	27	(United States) Alexander Rossi	Andretti Autosport	Honda	69	Contact	2	2	61	12
22	3	(New Zealand) Scott McLaughlin R	Team Penske	Chevrolet	46	Contact	2	21	-	8
23	18	(United States) Santino Ferrucci	Dale Coyne Racing with Vasser-Sullivan	Honda	40	Contact	1	18	-	7
24	12	(Australia) Will Power W	Team Penske	Chevrolet	35	Contact	1	1	4	8
Fastest lap: (Sweden) Marcus Ericsson (Chip Ganassi Racing) – 01:01.2384 (lap 93)

== Championship standings after the race ==
By securing the championship, Scott Dixon became one of the few drivers to lead the IndyCar Series championship standings from the start of the season to its conclusion.

Drivers' Championship standings

	Pos.	Driver	Points
Unchanged	1	(New Zealand) Scott Dixon	537
Unchanged	2	(United States) Josef Newgarden	521
Unchanged	3	(United States) Colton Herta	421
Plus	4	(Mexico) Pato O'Ward	416
Minus	5	(Australia) Will Power	396

Engine manufacturer standings

	Pos.	Manufacturer	Points
Unchanged	1	Honda	1122
Unchanged	2	Chevrolet	1099
Point standings

- Note: Only the top five positions are included.

Previous race: 2020 Harvest Grand Prix	IndyCar Series; 2020 season	Next race: —
Previous race: 2019 Firestone Grand Prix of St. Petersburg	Grand Prix of St. Petersburg	Next race: 2021 Firestone Grand Prix of St. Petersburg
