= Colton Herta =

American racing driver (born 2000)

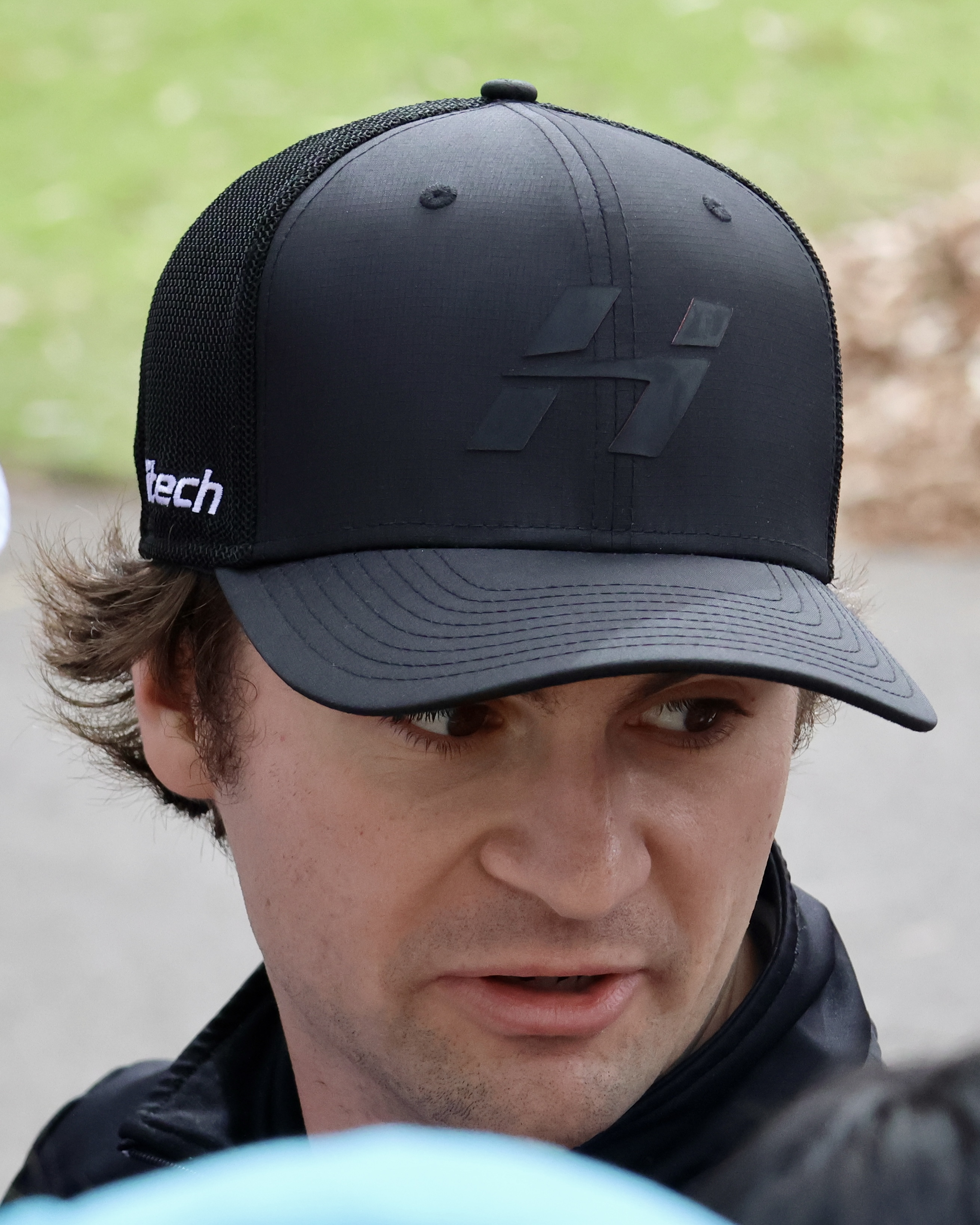
- Herta in 2026
- Nationality: (United States) American
- Born: Colton Thomas Herta; March 30, 2000 (age 26) Santa Clarita, California, U.S.
- Relatives: Bryan Herta (father)
- Categorisation: FIA Silver (2018); FIA Gold (2019–2024); FIA Platinum (2025–)

IndyCar Series career
- 116 races run over 8 years
- Best finish: 2nd (2024)
- First race: 2018 Grand Prix of Sonoma (Sonoma)
- Last race: 2025 Borchetta Bourbon Music City Grand Prix (Nashville)
- First win: 2019 IndyCar Classic (Austin)
- Last win: 2024 Music City Grand Prix (Nashville)
Wins	Podiums	Poles
9	20	16

FIA Formula 2 Championship career
- Debut season: 2026
- Current team: Hitech
- Car number: 4
- Starts: 20
- Wins: 0
- Podiums: 0
- Poles: 0
- Best finish: TBD in 2026

Previous series
- 2017–2018; 2016; 2016; 2015; 2014: Indy Lights; Euroformula Open; BRDC British Formula 3; MSA Formula; U.S. F2000

Championship titles
- 2013: Pacific Formula F1600

Colton Thomas Herta (/ˈhɜːrtə/; born March 30, 2000) is an American racing driver who competes in the FIA Formula 2 Championship for Hitech with support from Cadillac. Herta competed in the IndyCar Series from 2018 to 2025.

Herta is the son of IndyCar and Champ Car driver Bryan Herta, and the youngest person ever to win an IndyCar Series race. He is test driver for the Cadillac Formula One Team whilst competing in FIA Formula 2 for 2026 with Hitech Grand Prix.

== Junior racing career ==
=== Karting (2010–2013) ===
Herta made his competitive karting debut in 2010 at the age of ten, racing karts in the SKUSA and IKF series, although he had been karting since the age of six. He made his single-seater racing debut at the age of thirteen, finishing second in the SBF2000 Winter Series.

=== USF2000 Championship (2014) ===
In 2014, Herta made his professional racing debut in the Cooper Tires USF2000 Championship Powered by Mazda, finishing fifteenth in the championship despite missing the opening weekend due to age requirements. In the same year, Herta made his international formula racing debut at the Sepang International Circuit in Malaysia with the Meritus-run AsiaCup Series, taking part in one event where he won one race win and three podium finishes. Herta also made a one-off appearance in the Global RallyCross Championship Lites, being the youngest driver to compete in the series.

=== Racing in Europe (2015–2016) ===
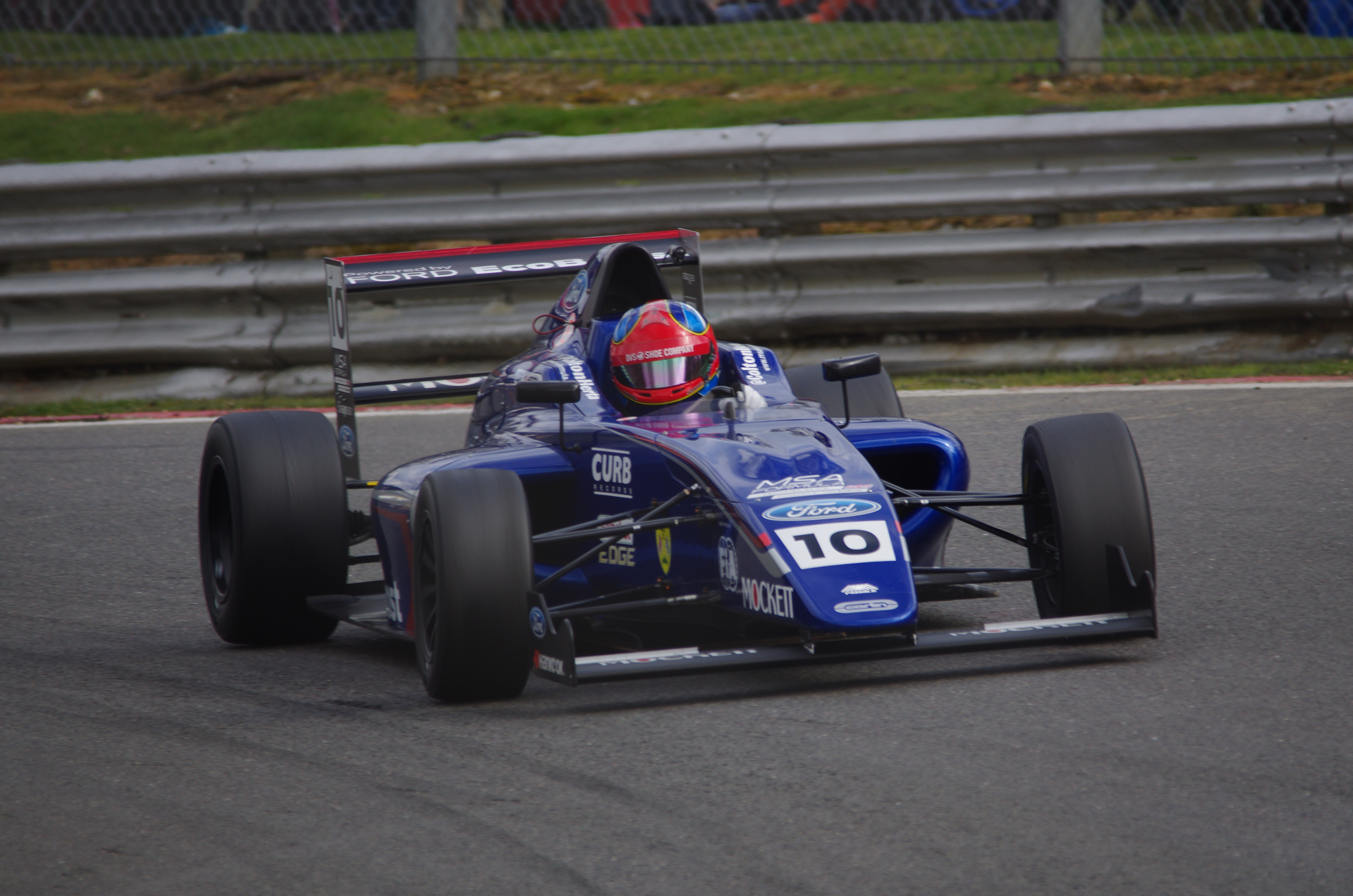
Herta racing at Brands Hatch in MSA Formula.

In 2015, Herta made his debut in the UK-based MSA Formula series, as the youngest driver and the only American on a grid that consisted mostly of Britons, and got his first win in the second race at Snetterton Circuit in August, thus helping the United States win the Nations Cup. He went on to collect three more victories throughout the season, finishing third overall.

For 2016, Herta was planning to move to the newly renamed BRDC British F3 series, but was too young to compete at the opening round. Wanting to complete a full season, he made the switch to the Euroformula Open Championship, staying with Carlin and finished third in points, with four victories, six podium finishes, and five pole positions. Herta went on to compete in six British F3 events, earning three podium finishes including a victory at Brands Hatch.

=== Indy Lights (2017–2018) ===
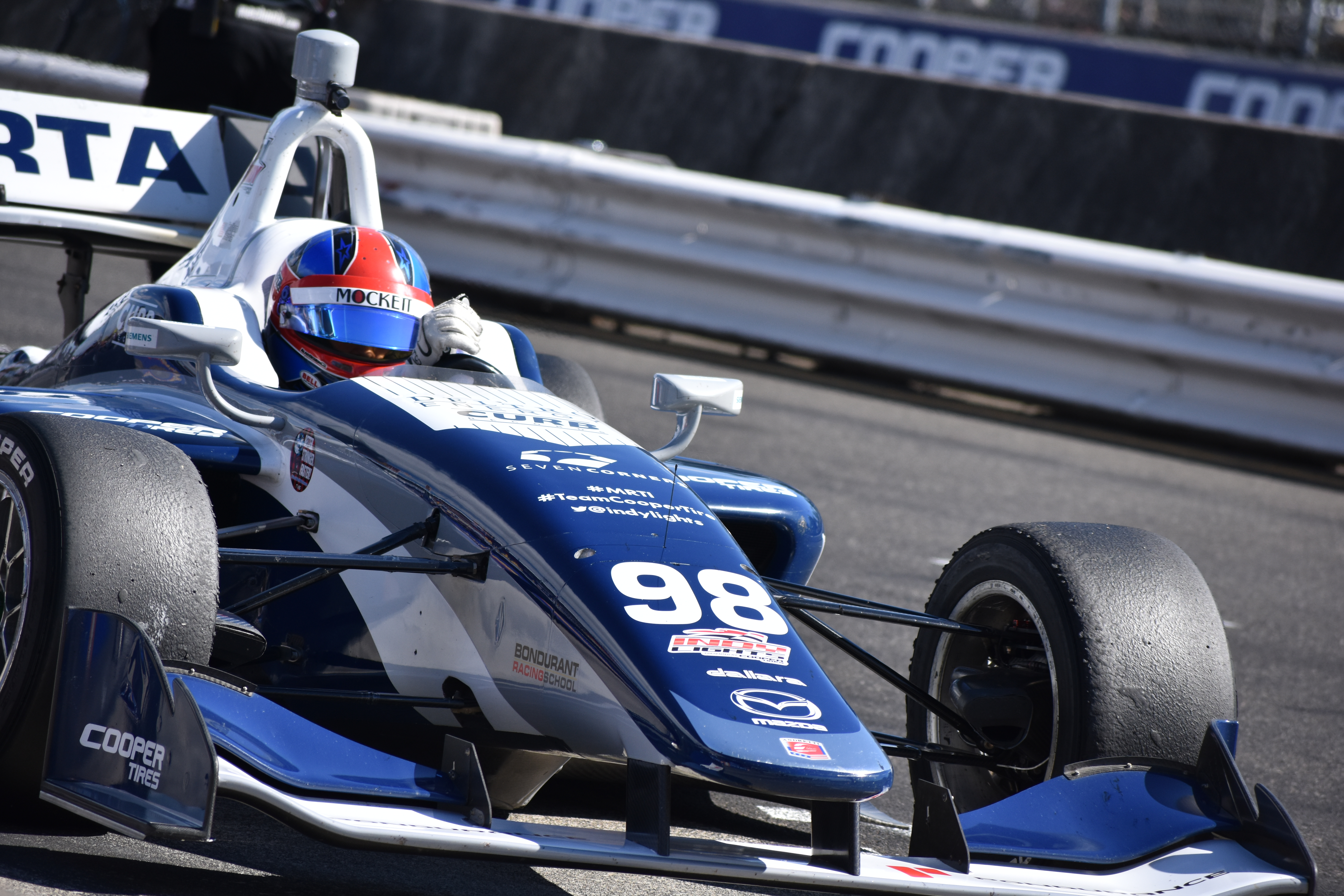
Herta driving at Portland during the 2018 Indy Lights season.

In 2017, Herta joined forces with the newly formed Steinbrenner Racing to pilot the No. 98 car in the Indy Lights Series. He started the year strong with a second place finish in the first race at St. Petersburg street circuit and followed it up with a Sunday victory; Colton's first win in Indy Lights. He got his second victory at the next event at Barber Motorsports Park, the series' four-hundredth race. Herta won Rookie of the Year and finished third in the drivers championship.

In 2018, Herta remained in Indy Lights. He won four races, including all three held at Indianapolis Motor Speedway (both races of the GP of Indianapolis and the Freedom 100 on the speedway). Herta finished second in points to his Andretti teammate Patricio O'Ward.

== IndyCar career ==
In September 2018, Herta made his IndyCar Series debut at the season finale in Sonoma, driving for Harding Racing.

=== Harding Steinbrenner Racing ===
==== 2019: Rookie season ====
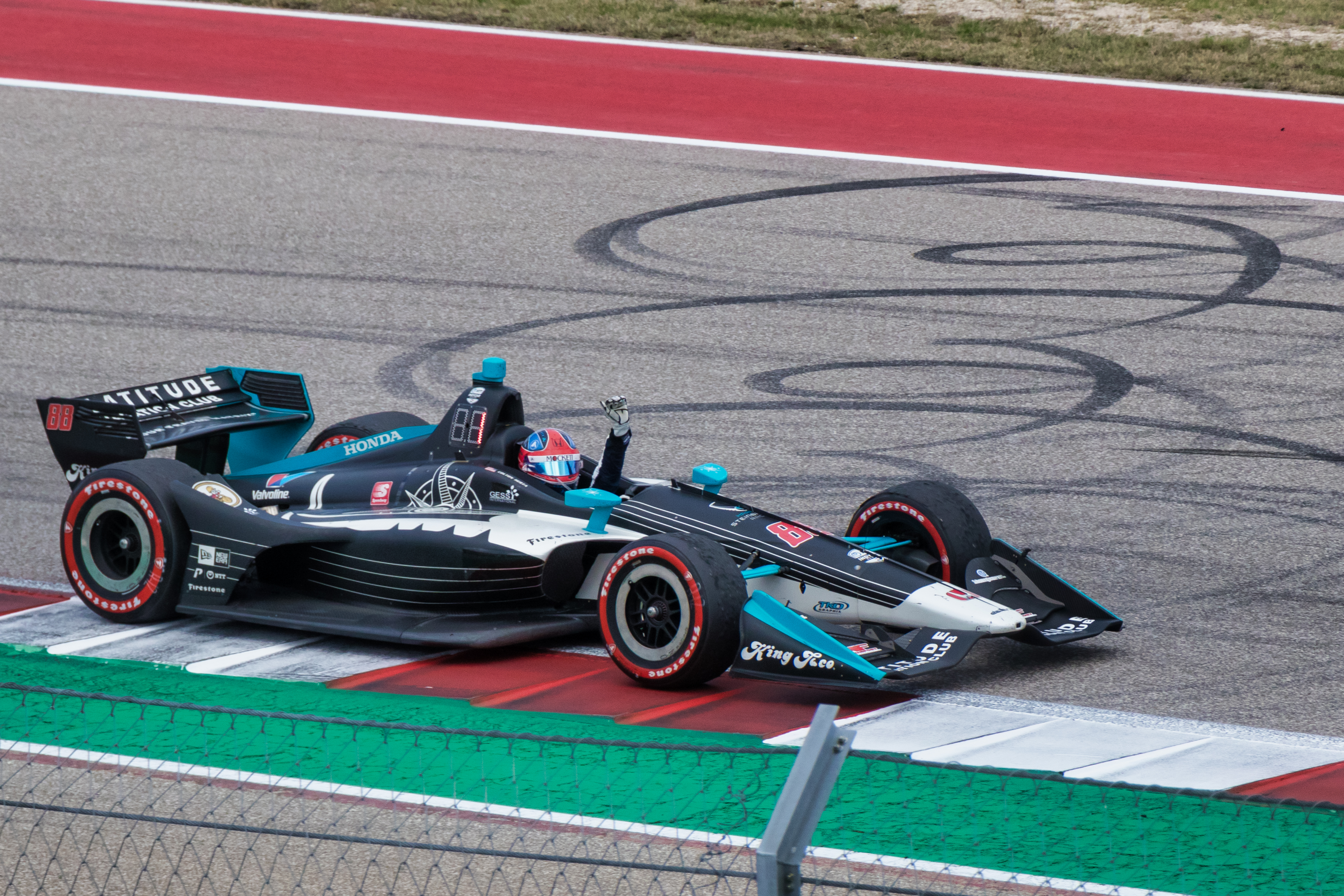
Herta won his first race at the IndyCar Classic in 2019.

For the 2019 IndyCar season, Herta signed to drive the No. 88 Harding Steinbrenner Racing car. Herta was the first IndyCar Series driver born in the 2000s to start a race. On March 24, 2019, at the age of eighteen, Herta became the youngest-ever winner in IndyCar history by winning the IndyCar Classic at Circuit of the Americas. He qualified fifth for the Indianapolis 500, but retired after just four laps after a gearbox failure. On June 22, 2019, at the age of nineteen, Herta became the youngest-ever pole-sitter at Road America. He won again at Laguna Seca, and finished seventh in the overall standings, just five points behind Rookie of the Year Felix Rosenqvist.

==== 2020: Backed by Andretti ====
Herta again drove the No. 88 car for Harding Steinbrenner Racing in 2020, with additional backing from Andretti Autosport. Herta finished seventh in the opening round of the 2020 IndyCar season at Texas Motor Speedway. He finished eighth at the Indianapolis 500. On September 13, 2020, Herta won the second of two races held at Mid-Ohio. He scored a runner-up finish at the Indianapolis road course's Saturday race. With seven top-fives in fourteen races, he ranked third in points.

=== Andretti Autosport ===
==== 2021: Three more wins ====
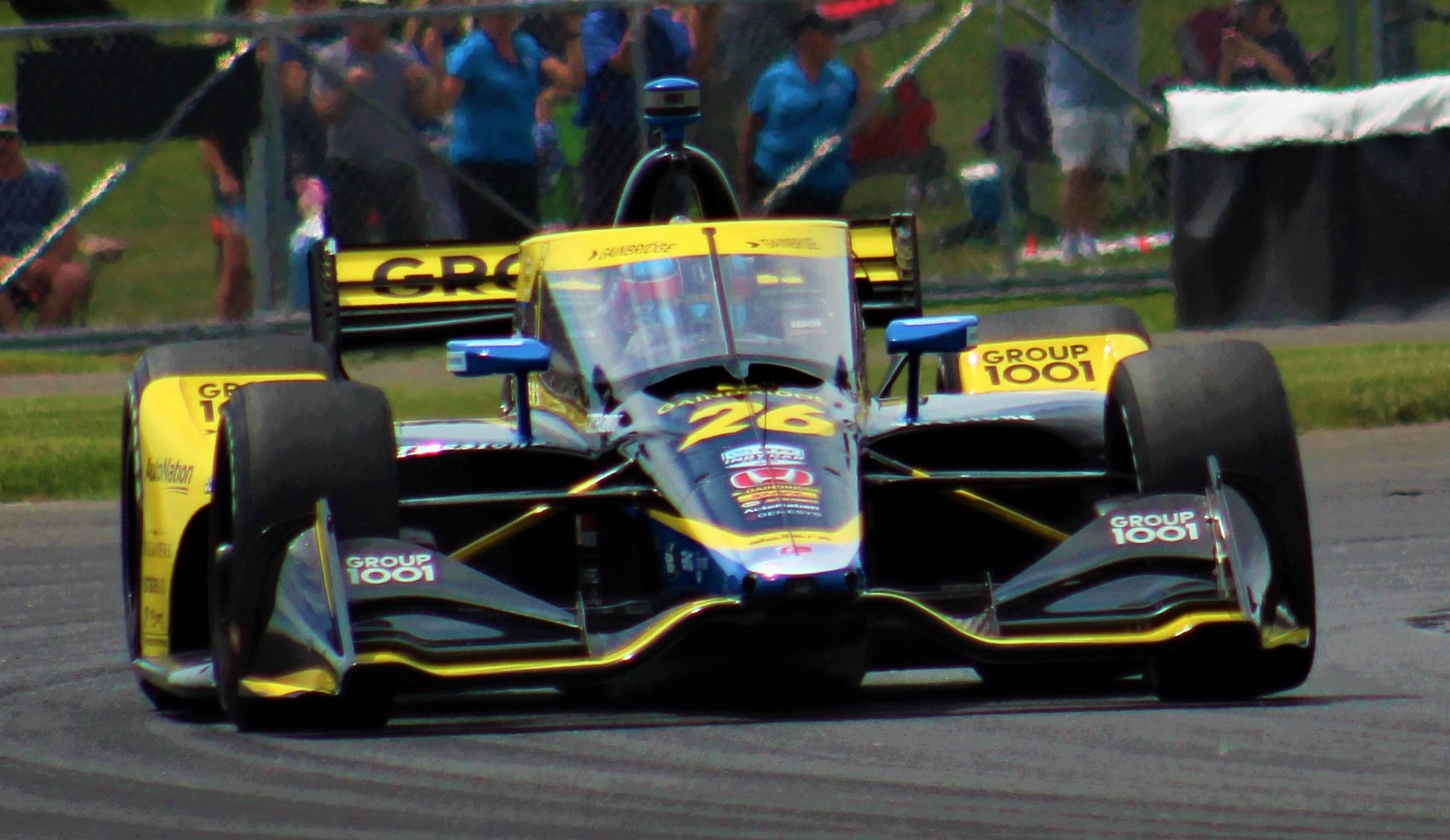
Herta driving in the 2021 Big Machine Spiked Coolers Grand Prix

Going into 2021, Herta was seen as the strongest challenger in the Andretti stable to Scott Dixon for the IndyCar title. Herta would also move from the No. 88 Andretti Harding Steinbrenner Racing car to the No. 26 Andretti Autosport with Curb Agajanian car with backing from Indianapolis 500 title sponsor Gainbridge. Herta started his season caught up in an accident caused by Josef Newgarden in Alabama but earned his first win of the season at St. Petersburg, his first win on a street circuit. He would secure two podium finishes before his second win of the season; a second-place at Road America and third place at the second round on the IMS Road Course. He was frequently beset by poor strategy, mechanical issues, and driving errors. Most notable of these was at the inaugural round in Nashville; Herta would qualify on pole position for the race, lead most of the race, lost the lead under caution to Marcus Ericsson, and crashed out of the race attempting to take the lead back from Ericsson in the closing laps. Herta was running in the lead at Gateway before a half-shaft failure during a pit stop forced his retirement. Herta would pick up his second win of the season at Laguna Seca, where he led all but one lap of the race to win from pole. He finished the season off with a come from behind victory on The Streets of Long Beach when he started fourteenth and worked his way rapidly through the field to take the lead from Josef Newgarden and Scott Dixon to win his third race of the season. He ultimately finished the season fifth in the championship standings.

==== 2022: A difficult season ====
After intense speculation that he would be making a move to Formula One, Andretti Autosport and Herta announced that he would be racing in IndyCar in 2022, partnering Alexander Rossi, Romain Grosjean, and Devlin DeFrancesco. Herta struggled in the initial rounds of the season, including crashing after losing the lead at Long Beach, but picked up his first win of the season at the GMR Grand Prix. Herta was in place to win the second race at the IMS road course before a mechanical failure would cause him to have to retire the car for the day and his teammate Alexander Rossi would win.

==== 2023: Winless campaign ====
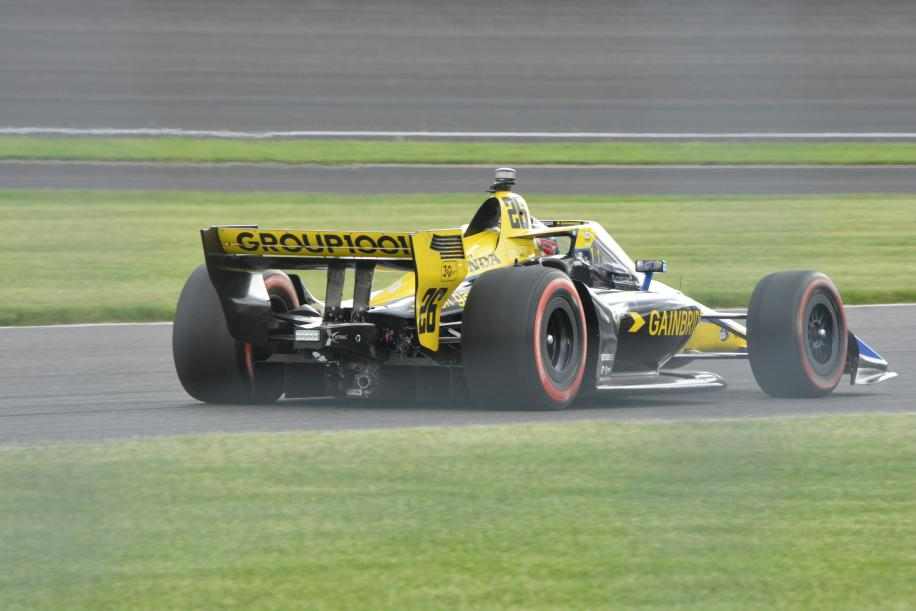
Herta in 9th place at the GMR Grand Prix

Herta initially signed a multi-year contract to remain with Andretti Autosport, though this would be later to be extended to 2027. Herta's 2023 would end with three top-five finishes, including a podium at Toronto. He also took back-to-back poles at Mid-Ohio and Road America, where he would also lead the most laps. Road America proved to be the closest Herta would come to a win in 2023, dominating the race before dropping to fifth due to a poor strategy call forcing him to save fuel to reach the finish. The season concluded with Herta tenth in the standings again after a tough second half including two DNFs at Nashville Street Circuit and the finale at Laguna Seca.

==== 2024: Championship runner-up ====
Herta started the season with five top-five finishes in the first five races, including podiums at St. Petersburg and Long Beach. He struggled with bad luck and performance issues after the Indianapolis 500, though did manage to pick up another podium finish at Laguna Seca and his first pole position on an oval at Iowa. Herta finally broke through at Toronto, qualifying on pole and winning his first race in two years. At the final race of the season at the Nashville Superspeedway, Herta broke through and took his first win on an oval, securing second place to Alex Palou in the 2024 IndyCar Series championship standings, his highest points total yet. Herta also became the highest scoring Andretti Autosport driver in the modern IndyCar era since Ryan Hunter-Reay in 2012.

==== 2025: Final year with Andretti ====
Following the season's end, Herta would leave Andretti and the IndyCar series altogether, transferring to Formula 2 while becoming Cadillac's test driver in Formula One, with Will Power replacing him after getting released from Team Penske.

==== 2026: Aborted Indy 500 entry ====
Herta was planning on entering the 2026 Indianapolis 500 in May, as there was originally a break in the F2 Championship, after the third round in Saudi Arabia. The proposed plan was to drive the No. 98 for Andretti. However, due to the Iran war, the FIA had to cancel the races in Bahrain and Saudi Arabia and replace them with rounds in Miami and Canada, the latter race clashing with the Indy 500. Ultimately, Herta had to scrap his plans after the reschedule was announced.

== Sports car racing ==
=== 2019 ===
Herta participated in the 2019 24 Hours of Daytona in a BMW M8 GTE for Rahal Letterman Lanigan Racing in the WeatherTech SportsCar Championship. He, along with co-drivers Connor De Phillippi, Augusto Farfus and Philipp Eng, won the race in the GTLM class.

==== 2022 ====
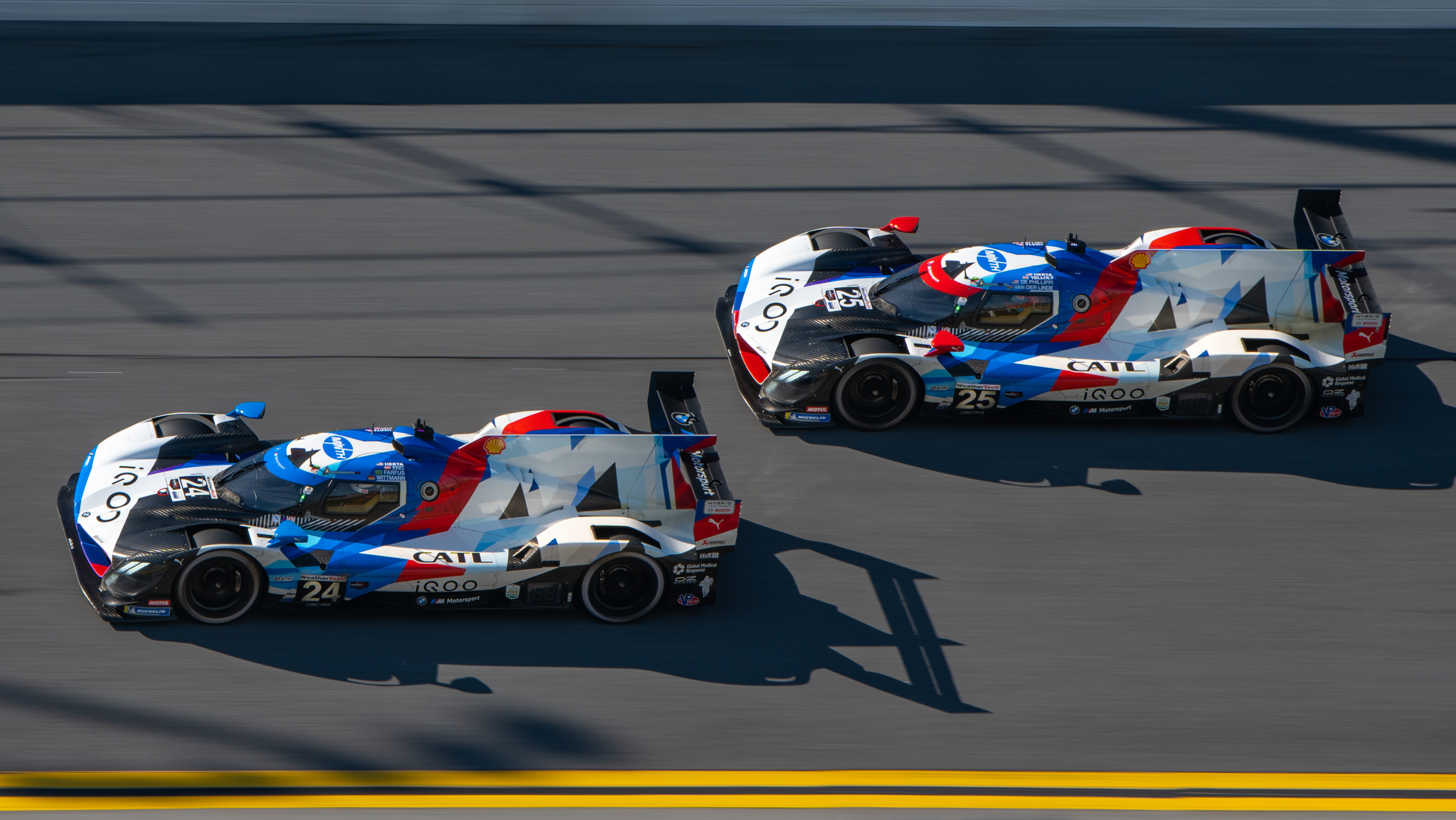
Herta (No. 25) drove both BMW M Hybrid V8's at the 2023 24 Hours of Daytona.

Herta returned to Daytona participate in the 2022 edition, partnering fellow IndyCar drivers Pato O'Ward and Devlin DeFrancesco along with Eric Lux in an LMP2 entry for DragonSpeed. The quartet won after Herta took the lead in the final eleven minutes of the race.

==== 2023 ====
In late 2022, Herta was confirmed as one of the drivers for the new BMW M Hybrid V8 prototype to be fielded by Rahal Letterman Lannigan racing during the 2023 IMSA SportsCar Championship.

==== 2024 ====
In the 2024 IMSA SportsCar Championship, Herta drove the No. 40 Acura for Wayne Taylor Racing with Andretti Autosport and earned his first overall win in the series at the 12 Hours of Sebring.

==== 2026 ====
Alongside his Formula 2 campaign and Formula 1 duties, Herta will compete part-time in the IMSA SportsCar Championship with Cadillac Wayne Taylor Racing.

== Formula racing career outside of Indycar ==
With the attempted purchase of Sauber by Andretti Autosport in 2021, Herta was the favorite candidate to join Formula One with Alfa Romeo for the 2022 season. This led to both a seat mold made for him and a test with the simulator at the team's base in Hinwil, Switzerland—where Mario Andretti and various other reports claimed he set faster times than Kimi Räikkönen and Antonio Giovinazzi, Alfa Romeo's 2021 lineup. A preliminary agreement was reached with Ferrari to hold a 300 km (186.41 mi) test with Herta to allow him to participate in free practices at the United States, Mexico City and São Paulo Grands Prix. However, negotiations between Andretti and Sauber broke down at the end of 2021, resulting in Herta never participating in the test sessions.

Herta was later signed by McLaren in 2022 as a development driver to test the MCL35M–McLaren's 2021 car. He took part in his first test drive from July 11–13 around the Algarve International Circuit in Portimão. Later that year, Red Bull began to show interest in having Herta as an AlphaTauri driver in 2023. Herta however, lacked enough points to obtain an FIA Super Licence—necessary to be able to contest in Formula One. Red Bull began efforts to obtain one for Herta, asking the Fédération Internationale de l'Automobile (FIA) to consider an exception for Herta. Red Bull then reached an agreement with Alpine for Herta to test their Formula One cars in September at the Hungaroring—an event the French team organised to aid effort to choose their 2023 driver—in an effort to earn Herta more super licence points. Alpine would accept on the condition that then AlphaTauri driver, Pierre Gasly, was free to join the French team. Ultimately, the FIA refused to make an exception for Herta, forcing Red Bull to abandon its efforts to bring the American driver to Formula One, with Herta not participating in the tests with Alpine.

In late 2024, Herta became heavily linked to a drive at the newly-forming Cadillac Formula One Team after their bid to join Formula One in 2026 was accepted. Mario Andretti—a member of the board of directors—stated that one of their two seats would "most likely" go to him, but added that "you have to keep your options open." Cadillac later announced that their two seats would be filled by Sergio Pérez and Valtteri Bottas in August 2025 as Herta fell short of the fourth place finish needed to secure a Super License for 2026. The next month, Herta was later announced as Cadillac's test driver for 2026, leaving Andretti's IndyCar outfit to fulfill this role. Cadillac CEO Dan Towriss also announced that Herta would aim for a seat in Formula 2, in an attempt to obtain enough super license points to be eligible for a spot in Formula One. Herta would need an outright top-eight finish in Formula 2 to reach the 40 points required for an FIA Super License for 2027, or a top ten finish with free practice sessions (one point each). Cadillac and Hitech Grand Prix confirmed Herta would join their Formula 2 outfit for the 2026 season. He was then selected as the Cadillac Formula 1 team's test and development driver for the 2026 season. Herta made his Formula One practice debut, replacing Pérez during FP1 at the 2026 Barcelona-Catalunya Grand Prix. He completed his maiden session in 21st place.

During the 2026 Mexico City Grand Prix Herta was expected to get his 40th FIA Super Licence point which would let him race in Formula 1. However, due to IndyCar website incorrectly listing him as 6th when he finished 7th he has 39 out of the 40 required points after the 2026 Mexico City Grand Prix. Herta got his 40th point after participating in FP1 at the 2026 São Paulo Grand Prix. Despite this, along with the rumor that Cadillac were looking to put him in Formula One for the following season, the team confirmed that regular driver Bottas would continue to race for them in 2027.

== Personal life ==
Outside of racing, Herta is a member of the indie punk rock band The Zibs, where he plays the drums. He formed the band in 2018 with his high school friends Jon Graber and Chris Broadbent.

== Karting record ==
=== Karting career summary ===
Season	Series	Team	Position
2010	SKUSA SoCal Pro Kart Challenge – TaG Cadet		3rd
2010	SKUSA Pro Tour – TaG Cadet		1st
2010	SKUSA SuperNationals – TaG Cadet		3rd
2011	SKUSA SoCal Pro Kart Challenge – TaG Cadet		1st
2011	SKUSA Pro Tour – TaG Cadet		1st
2011	ROK Cup International Final – Mini ROK		7th
2012	California Pro Kart Challenge — TaG Junior		3rd
2012	Skip Barber Racing School		14th
2012	SKUSA Pro Tour – TaG Junior		7th
2012	SKUSA SuperNationals – TaG Junior	Pitts Performance	5th
2013	SKUSA SuperNationals – TaG Junior		5th
2014	SKUSA SuperNationals – TaG Junior	Phil Giebler Racing	10th

== Racing record ==
=== Career summary ===
Season	Series	Team	Races	Wins	Poles	F/Laps	Podiums	Points	Position
2012–13	SBF2000 Winter Series	N/A	12	1	1	0	4	287	6th
2013	Pacific Formula F1600	PR1/BHA with Curb-Agajanian	15	10	6	10	15	413	**1st**
2014	U.S. F2000 National Championship	JAY Motorsports	12	0	0	1	0	115	15th
2014	AsiaCup Series	Meritus.GP	4	1	1	2	3	59	8th
2014	GRC Lites	AD Racing	1	N/A	0	N/A	N/A	16	15th
2015	MSA Formula Championship	Carlin	30	4	3	8	12	355	**3rd**
2016	Euroformula Open Championship	Carlin	16	4	5	4	7	199	**3rd**
2016	Spanish Formula 3 Championship	Carlin	6	2	2	1	4	94	**2nd**
2016	BRDC British Formula 3 Championship	Carlin	6	1	0	1	3	109	19th
2016	Masters of Formula 3	Carlin	1	0	0	0	0	N/A	13th
2017	Indy Lights	Andretti Steinbrenner Racing	16	2	7	3	7	300	**3rd**
2018	Indy Lights	Andretti Steinbrenner Racing	17	4	3	7	13	447	**2nd**
2018	IndyCar Series	Harding Racing	1	0	0	0	0	20	37th
2019	IndyCar Series	Harding Steinbrenner Racing	17	2	3	2	2	420	7th
2019	IMSA SportsCar Championship – GTLM	BMW Team RLL	3	1	0	0	2	89	14th
2020	IndyCar Series	Andretti Harding Steinbrenner Autosport	14	1	1	0	2	421	**3rd**
2020	IMSA SportsCar Championship – GTLM	BMW Team RLL	3	0	0	0	0	79	9th
2021	IndyCar Series	Andretti Autosport w/ Curb-Agajanian	16	3	3	2	5	311	5th
2021	IMSA SportsCar Championship – GTD	Turner Motorsport	2	1	1	1	1	285	50th
2022	IndyCar Series	Andretti Autosport	17	1	2	1	2	381	10th
2022	IMSA SportsCar Championship – LMP2	DragonSpeed USA	1	1	0	0	1	0	NC
2022	Formula One	McLaren F1 Team	Test driver						
2023	IndyCar Series	Andretti Autosport with Curb-Agajanian	17	0	2	0	1	356	10th
2023	IMSA SportsCar Championship – GTP	BMW M Team RLL	1	0	0	0	0	274	24th
2024	IndyCar Series	Andretti Global with Curb-Agajanian	17	2	3	1	6	513	**2nd**
2024	IMSA SportsCar Championship – GTP	Wayne Taylor Racing with Andretti Autosport	3	1	0	1	2	970	18th
2025	IndyCar Series	Andretti Global	17	0	2	0	2	372	7th
2025	IMSA SportsCar Championship – LMP2	CrowdStrike Racing by APR	1	0	0	0	0	272	47th
2026	FIA Formula 2 Championship	Hitech TGR	23	0	0	0	0	26	19th*
2026	IMSA SportsCar Championship - GTP	Cadillac Wayne Taylor Racing	3	0	0	0	1	873	19th
2026	Formula One	Cadillac F1 Team	Test driver						

^{*} Season still in progress.

=== Complete MSA Formula Championship results ===
(key) (Races in bold indicate pole position; races in italics indicate points for the fastest lap of top ten finishers)

Year	Entrant	1	2	3	4	5	6	7	8	9	10	11	12	13	14	15	16	17	18	19	20	21	22	23	24	25	26	27	28	29	30	DC	Points
2015	Carlin	BHI; 1; 12	BHI; 2; 4	BHI; 3; 14	DON; 1; 15	DON; 2; 9	DON; 3; 4	THR; 1; 5	THR; 2; 6	THR; 3; 9	OUL; 1; 3	OUL; 2; 6	OUL; 3 Ret	CRO; 1; 6	CRO; 2; 2	CRO; 3; 14	**SNE**; **1**; 9	SNE; 2; 1	**SNE**; **3**; 1	KNO; 1; 5	KNO; 2; 2	KNO; 3; 2	ROC; 1; 3	ROC; 2; 7	**ROC**; **3**; 1	SIL; 1; 2	SIL; 2; 5	SIL; 3; 2	BHGP; 1; 2	BHGP; 2; 5	BHGP; 3; 1	3rd	355

=== Complete Euroformula Open Championship results ===
(key) (Races in bold indicate pole position; races in italics indicate points for the fastest lap of top ten finishers)

Year	Entrant	1	2	3	4	5	6	7	8	9	10	11	12	13	14	15	16	DC	Points
2016	Carlin	EST; 1 Ret	EST; 2; 5	SPA; 1; 6	SPA; 2; 5	LEC; 1; 18	LEC; 2 EX	SIL; 1; 2	**SIL**; **2** Ret	**RBR**; **1**; 1	**RBR**; **2**; 1	MNZ; 1; 16	MNZ; 2; 4	**JER**; **1**; 1	JER; 2; 4	**CAT**; **1**; 2	CAT; 2; 1	3rd	199

=== American open-wheel racing results ===
==== U.S. F2000 National Championship ====
Year	Team	1	2	3	4	5	6	7	8	9	10	11	12	13	14	Rank	Points
2014	JAY Motorsports	STP	STP	BAR; 19	BAR; 7	IMS; 5	IMS; 20	LOR; 14	TOR; 5	TOR; 14	MOH; 10	MOH; 16	MOH; 13	SNM; 7	SNM; 9	**15th**	**115**

==== Indy Lights ====
Year	Team	1	2	3	4	5	6	7	8	9	10	11	12	13	14	15	16	17	Rank	Points
2017	Andretti Steinbrenner Racing	STP; 2	**STP**; 1	ALA; 10	**ALA**; 1	IMS; 12	IMS; 10	INDY; 13	RDA; 12	**ROA**; 3	**IOW**; 4	TOR; 4	**TOR**; 10	MOH; 2	**MOH**; 6	GMP; 3	**WGL**; 3		3rd	300
2018	Andretti Steinbrenner Racing	STP; 3	STP; 8	**ALA**; 2	ALA; 3	IMS; 1	IMS; 1	INDY; 1	RDA; 1	RDA; 2	IOW; 2	**TOR**; 7	TOR; 6	MOH; 2	MOH; 2	**GTW**; 2	POR; 2	POR; 4	2nd	447

==== IndyCar Series ====
(key)

Year	Team	No.	Chassis	Engine	1	2	3	4	5	6	7	8	9	10	11	12	13	14	15	16	17	18	Rank	Points	Ref
2018	Harding Racing	88	Dallara DW12	Chevrolet	STP	PHX	LBH	ALA	IMS	INDY	DET	DET	TXS	ROA	IOW	TOR	MOH	POC	GTW	POR	SNM; 20		37th	20	
2019	Harding Steinbrenner Racing	88	Dallara DW12	Honda	STP; 8	COA; 1	ALA; 24	LBH; 23	IMS; 23	INDY; 33	DET; 12	DET; 12	TXS; 18	**RDA**; 8	TOR; 7	IOW; 18	MOH; 8	POC; 16	GTW; 9	**POR**; 4	**LAG**; 1		7th	420	
2020	Andretti Harding Steinbrenner Autosport	88	Dallara DW12	Honda	TXS; 7	IMS; 4	ROA; 5	ROA; 5	IOW; 19	IOW; 19	INDY; 8	GTW; 4	GTW; 6	MOH; 9	**MOH**; 1	IMS; 4	IMS; 2	STP; 11					3rd	421	
2021	Andretti Autosport	26	Dallara DW12	Honda	ALA; 22	**STP**; 1	TXS; 22	TXS; 5															5th	455	
2021	Andretti Autosport w/ Curb-Agajanian	26	Dallara DW12	Honda					IMS; 13	INDY; 16	DET; 14	DET; 4	ROA; 2	MOH; 13	**NSH**; 19*	IMS; 3	GTW; 18	POR; 8	**LAG**; 1*	LBH; 1*			5th	455	
2022	Andretti Autosport w/ Curb-Agajanian	26	Dallara DW12	Honda	STP; 4	TXS; 12	**LBH**; 23	ALA; 10	IMS; 1*	INDY; 30	DET; 8	ROA; 5	MOH; 15	**TOR**; 2	IOW; 24	IOW; 12	IMS; 24	NSH; 5	GTW; 11	POR; 6	LAG; 11		10th	381	
2023	Andretti Autosport w/ Curb-Agajanian	26	Dallara DW12	Honda	STP; 20	TXS; 7	LBH; 4	ALA; 14	IMS; 9	INDY; 9	DET; 11	**ROA**; 5*	**MOH**; 11	TOR; 3	IOW; 19	IOW; 7	NSH; 21	IMS; 13	GTW; 6	POR; 13	LAG; 23		10th	356	
2024	Andretti Global w/ Curb-Agajanian	26	Dallara DW12	Honda	STP; 3	THE; 4	LBH; 2	ALA; 8	IMS; 7	INDY; 23	**DET**; 19	ROA; 6	LAG; 2	MOH; 4	**IOW**; 11	IOW; 5	**TOR**; 1	GTW; 5	POR; 4	MIL; 22	MIL; 3	NSH; 1	2nd	513	
2025	Andretti Global w/ Curb-Agajanian	26	Dallara DW12	Honda	STP; 16	THE; 4	LBH; 7	ALA; 7	IMS; 25	INDY; 14	**DET**; 3	GTW; 17	ROA; 16	MOH; 4	IOW; 13	IOW; 20	**TOR**; 4	LAG; 3	POR; 10	MIL; 11	NSH; 11		7th	372	

==== Indianapolis 500 ====
Year	Chassis	Engine	Start	Finish	Team
2019	Dallara	Honda	5	33	Harding Steinbrenner Racing
2020	Dallara	Honda	10	8	Andretti Harding Steinbrenner Autosport
2021	Dallara	Honda	2	16	Andretti Autosport
2022	Dallara	Honda	25	30	Andretti Autosport
2023	Dallara	Honda	21	9	Andretti Autosport
2024	Dallara	Honda	13	23	Andretti Global
2025	Dallara	Honda	27	14	Andretti Global

=== Complete IMSA SportsCar Championship results ===
(key) (Races in bold indicate pole position; races in italics indicate fastest lap)

Year	Entrant	Class	Make	Engine	1	2	3	4	5	6	7	8	9	10	11	12	Rank	Points
2019	BMW Team RLL	GTLM	BMW M8 GTE	BMW S63 4.0 L Twin-turbo V8	DAY; 1	SEB; 7	LBH	MOH	WGL	MOS	LIM	ELK	VIR	LGA	PET; 3		14th	89
2020	BMW Team RLL	GTLM	BMW M8 GTE	BMW S63 4.0 L Turbo V8	DAY; 5	DAY	SEB	ELK	VIR	ATL	MOH	CLT	PET; 6	LGA	SEB; 4		9th	79
2021	Turner Motorsport	GTD	BMW M6 GT3	BMW 4.4 L Turbo V8	**DAY**; 6	SEB	MOH	DET	WGL	WGL	LIM	ELK	LGA	LBH	VIR	PET	50th	285
2022	DragonSpeed USA	LMP2	Oreca 07	Gibson GK428 V8	DAY; 1†	SEB	LGA	MOH	WGL	ELK	PET						NC†	0†
2023	BMW M Team RLL	GTP	BMW M Hybrid V8	BMW P66/3 4.0 L Turbo V8	DAY; 6	SEB	LBH	LGA	WGL	MOS	ELK	IMS	PET				24th	274
2024	Wayne Taylor Racing with Andretti Autosport	GTP	Acura ARX-06	Acura AR24e 2.4 L Turbo V6	DAY; 3	SEB; 1	LBH	LGA	DET	WGL	ELK	IMS	PET; 7				18th	970
2025	CrowdStrike Racing by APR	LMP2	Oreca 07	Gibson GK428 V8	DAY; 6	SEB	WGL	MOS	ELK	IMS	PET						47th	272
2026	Cadillac Wayne Taylor Racing	GTP	Cadillac V-Series.R	Cadillac LMC55R 5.5 L V8	DAY; 6	SEB; 7	LBH	LGA	DET	WGL	ELK	IMS	PET; 3				19th	873

^{†} Points only counted towards the Michelin Endurance Cup, and not the overall LMP2 Championship.

=== Complete FIA Formula 2 Championship results ===
(key) (Races in bold indicate pole position) (Races in italics indicate fastest lap)

Year	Entrant	1	2	3	4	5	6	7	8	9	10	11	12	13	14	15	16	17	18	19	20	21	22	23	24	25	26	27	28	29	DC	Points
2026	Hitech	MEL; SPR; 16	MEL; FEA; 7	MIA; SPR; 15	MIA; FEA; 8	MTL; SPR; 9	MTL; FEA; 7	MON; SPR; 15	MON; FEA; 19	CAT; SPR; 5	CAT; FEA; 15	RBR; SPR; Ret	RBR; FEA; 18	SIL; SPR; 15	SIL; FEA; 16	SPA; SPR; 13	SPA; FEA; 7	HUN; SPR; 14	HUN; FEA; 19	MNZ; SPR; 15	MNZ; FEA; Ret	MAD; SPR; WD	MAD; FEA; WD	BAK; SPR; 9	BAK; FEA1; 13	BAK; FEA2; 15	LSL; SPR	LSL; FEA	YMC; SPR	YMC; FEA	19th*	26*

=== Complete Formula One participations ===
(key) (Races in bold indicate pole position) (Races in italics indicate fastest lap)

Year	Entrant	Chassis	Engine	1	2	3	4	5	6	7	8	9	10	11	12	13	14	15	16	17	18	19	20	21	22	23	WDC	Points
2026	Cadillac Formula One Team	Cadillac MAC-26	Ferrari 067/6 1.6 V6 t	AUS	CHN	JPN	MIA	CAN	MON	BCN; TD	AUT	GBR	BEL	HUN; TD	NED	ITA; TD	ESP	AZE	BHR	SIN	USA; TD	MXC; TD	SAP; TD	LVG	QAT	ABU	–	–

* Season still in progress.
