= 2020 REV Group Grand Prix =

(United States) 2020 Road America
Race details
3rd and 4th round of the 2020 IndyCar Series season
| ← Previous race | Next race → |
- Date: July 11 and 12, 2020
- Official name: REV Group Grand Prix at Road America
- Location: Road America
- Course: Permanent racing facility 4.048 mi / 6.458 km
- Distance: 55 laps 222.64 mi / 358.304 km
Race 1

Pole position
- Driver: (United States) Josef Newgarden (Team Penske)
- Time: 1:45.5191

Fastest lap
- Driver: (United States) Marco Andretti (Andretti Herta Autosport w/Marco Andretti and Curb-Agajanian)
- Time: 1:47.591 (on lap 34 of 55)

Podium
- First: (New Zealand) Scott Dixon (Chip Ganassi Racing)
- Second: (Australia) Will Power (Team Penske)
- Third: (Spain) Álex Palou (Dale Coyne Racing w/Team Goh)
Race 2

Pole position
- Driver: (Mexico) Patricio O'Ward (Arrow McLaren SP)
- Time: 1:44.8971

Fastest lap
- Driver: (Sweden) Felix Rosenqvist (Chip Ganassi Racing)
- Time: 1:47.1804 (on lap 13 of 55)

Podium
- First: (Sweden) Felix Rosenqvist (Chip Ganassi Racing)
- Second: (Mexico) Patricio O'Ward (Arrow McLaren SP)
- Third: (United States) Alexander Rossi (Andretti Autosport)

The 2020 REV Group Grand Prix Doubleheader was an IndyCar Series event held July 11–12, 2020. It made up the third and fourth rounds of the series' 2020 season. The race was originally scheduled for June 21, but was postponed due to the COVID-19 pandemic. In addition, the weekend was turned in to a double-header event in an effort to make up for races outright cancelled by the pandemic. The race was also the first event of the 2020 season to allow spectators at the track, with track promoters allowing unrestricted attendance.

== Race 1 – July 11 ==
All sessions for race 1 took place on Saturday, July 11.

=== Qualifying ===
Qualifying began at 2:15 CDT. As the event was doubleheader, series rules meant qualifying was a single round (instead of two rounds as normal), split into two groups. Drivers from the group with the fastest driver having the better time started in the odd number positions, while the group whose fastest time was worse than the other group took even number positions.

| Key | Meaning |
|---|---|
| R | Rookie |
| W | Past winner |

| Pos | No. | Name | Grp. | Time |
|---|---|---|---|---|
| 1 | 1 | (United States) Josef Newgarden W | 2 | 1:45.5191 |
| 2 | 60 | (United Kingdom) Jack Harvey | 1 | 1:45.7290 |
| 3 | 28 | (United States) Ryan Hunter-Reay | 2 | 1:45.6563 |
| 4 | 15 | (United States) Graham Rahal | 1 | 1:45.7593 |
| 5 | 12 | (Australia) Will Power W | 2 | 1:45.8244 |
| 6 | 18 | (United States) Santino Ferrucci | 1 | 1:45.7696 |
| 7 | 88 | (United States) Colton Herta | 2 | 1:45.8609 |
| 8 | 10 | (Sweden) Felix Rosenqvist | 1 | 1:45.8469 |
| 9 | 9 | (New Zealand) Scott Dixon W | 2 | 1:45.9324 |
| 10 | 98 | (United States) Marco Andretti | 1 | 1:45.9888 |
| 11 | 27 | (United States) Alexander Rossi W | 2 | 1:46.1365 |
| 12 | 5 | (Mexico) Patricio O'Ward | 1 | 1:46.0356 |
| 13 | 8 | (Sweden) Marcus Ericsson | 2 | 1:46.2980 |
| 14 | 55 | (Spain) Álex Palou R | 1 | 1:46.1260 |
| 15 | 30 | (Japan) Takuma Sato | 2 | 1:46.5368 |
| 16 | 21 | (Netherlands) Rinus VeeKay R | 1 | 1:46.1301 |
| 17 | 22 | (France) Simon Pagenaud | 2 | 1:46.7090 |
| 18 | 59 | (United Kingdom) Max Chilton | 1 | 1:46.3878 |
| 19 | 20 | (United States) Conor Daly | 2 | 1:46.8114 |
| 20 | 26 | (United States) Zach Veach | 1 | 1:46.4707 |
| 21 | 7 | (United States) Oliver Askew R | 2 | 1:47.1133 |
| 22 | 4 | (United States) Charlie Kimball | 1 | 1:47.6862 |
| 23 | 14 | (Canada) Dalton Kellett R | 2 | 1:47.5761 |

=== Race ===
The race was held at 5:15 EST.

| Pos | No. | Driver | Team | Engine | Laps | Time/Retired | Pit Stops | Grid | Laps Led | Pts.^{1} |
|---|---|---|---|---|---|---|---|---|---|---|
| 1 | 9 | (New Zealand) Scott Dixon W | Chip Ganassi Racing | Honda | 55 | 1:54:09.8697 | 3 | 9 | 16 | 51 |
| 2 | 12 | (Australia) Will Power W | Team Penske | Chevrolet | 55 | +2.538 | 3 | 5 | 10 | 41 |
| 3 | 55 | (Spain) Álex Palou R | Dale Coyne Racing w/Team Goh | Honda | 55 | +3.192 | 3 | 14 | | 35 |
| 4 | 28 | (United States) Ryan Hunter-Reay | Andretti Autosport | Honda | 55 | +3.984 | 3 | 3 | | 32 |
| 5 | 88 | (United States) Colton Herta | Andretti Harding Steinbrenner Racing | Honda | 55 | +7.249 | 3 | 7 | | 30 |
| 6 | 18 | (United States) Santino Ferrucci | Dale Coyne Racing w/Vasser-Sullivan | Honda | 55 | +8.200 | 3 | 6 | | 28 |
| 7 | 15 | (United States) Graham Rahal | Rahal Letterman Lanigan Racing | Honda | 55 | +11.355 | 3 | 4 | 2 | 27 |
| 8 | 5 | (Mexico) Patricio O'Ward | Arrow McLaren SP | Chevrolet | 55 | +14.784 | 3 | 12 | | 24 |
| 9 | 30 | (Japan) Takuma Sato | Rahal Letterman Lanigan Racing | Honda | 55 | +15.004 | 3 | 15 | | 22 |
| 10 | 8 | (Sweden) Marcus Ericsson | Chip Ganassi Racing | Honda | 55 | +15.766 | 3 | 13 | 2 | 21 |
| 11 | 4 | (United States) Charlie Kimball | A. J. Foyt Enterprises | Chevrolet | 55 | +16.170 | 3 | 22 | | 19 |
| 12 | 22 | (France) Simon Pagenaud | Team Penske | Chevrolet | 55 | +17.623 | 3 | 17 | | 18 |
| 13 | 21 | (Netherlands) Rinus VeeKay R | Ed Carpenter Racing | Chevrolet | 55 | +19.114 | 3 | 16 | | 17 |
| 14 | 1 | (United States) Josef Newgarden W | Team Penske | Chevrolet | 55 | +19.184 | 4 | 1 | 25 | 20 |
| 15 | 7 | (United States) Oliver Askew R | Arrow McLaren SP | Chevrolet | 55 | +20.977 | 3 | 21 | | 15 |
| 16 | 26 | (United States) Zach Veach | Andretti Autosport | Honda | 55 | +22.649 | 4 | 20 | | 14 |
| 17 | 59 | (United Kingdom) Max Chilton | Carlin | Chevrolet | 55 | +37.490 | 3 | 18 | | 13 |
| 18 | 10 | (Sweden) Felix Rosenqvist | Chip Ganassi Racing | Honda | 54 | +1 Lap | 3 | 8 | | 12 |
| 19 | 27 | (United States) Alexander Rossi W | Andretti Autosport | Honda | 54 | +1 Lap | 5 | 11 | | 11 |
| 20 | 14 | (Canada) Dalton Kellett R | A. J. Foyt Enterprises | Chevrolet | 54 | +1 Lap | 4 | 23 | | 10 |
| 21 | 20 | (United States) Conor Daly | Ed Carpenter Racing | Chevrolet | 41 | Contact | 3 | 19 | | 9 |
| 22 | 98 | (United States) Marco Andretti | Andretti Herta Autosport w/Marco Andretti and Curb-Agajanian | Honda | 39 | Mechanical | 5 | 10 | | 8 |
| 23 | 60 | (United Kingdom) Jack Harvey | Meyer Shank Racing | Honda | 37 | Off course | 2 | 2 | | 8 |

Notes: ^{1} Points include 1 point for leading at least 1 lap during a race, an additional 2 points for leading the most race laps, 1 point for Pole Position, and 1 point for the winner of the non-pole qualifying group.

=== Race statistics ===
Average speed: 116.027 mph (186.727 km/h)

Lead changes: 5

Lap leader breakdown
| From lap | To lap | Total laps | Driver |
|---|---|---|---|
| 1 | 12 | 12 | Josef Newgarden |
| 13 | 14 | 2 | Graham Rahal |
| 15 | 27 | 13 | Josef Newgarden |
| 28 | 29 | 2 | Marcus Ericsson |
| 30 | 39 | 10 | Will Power |
| 40 | 55 | 16 | Scott Dixon |

Cautions: 3 for 7 laps
| From lap | To lap | Total laps | Reason |
|---|---|---|---|
| 38 | 40 | 3 | #60 (Harvey) off course turn 3 |
| 42 | 43 | 2 | #5 (O'Ward) & #20 (Daly) contact turn 7 |
| 45 | 46 | 2 | #14 (Kellett) off course turn 14 |

=== Championship standings after the race ===
Drivers' Championship standings

| | Pos | Driver | Points |
|---|---|---|---|
| | 1 | (New Zealand) Scott Dixon | 155 |
| | 2 | (France) Simon Pagenaud | 93 |
| 1 | 3 | (United States) Colton Herta | 88 |
| 1 | 4 | (United States) Josef Newgarden | 84 |
| | 5 | (United States) Graham Rahal | 81 |

== Race 2 – July 12 ==
All sessions for race 2 took place on Sunday, July 12.

=== Qualifying ===
Qualifying took place at 10:00 a.m. EST

| Pos | No. | Name | Grp. | Time |
|---|---|---|---|---|
| 1 | 5 | (Mexico) Patricio O'Ward | 2 | 1:44.8971 |
| 2 | 88 | (United States) Colton Herta | 1 | 1:44.9250 |
| 3 | 55 | (Spain) Álex Palou R | 2 | 1:44.9192 |
| 4 | 28 | (United States) Ryan Hunter-Reay | 1 | 1:45.1534 |
| 5 | 15 | (United States) Graham Rahal | 2 | 1:45.0324 |
| 6 | 9 | (New Zealand) Scott Dixon W | 1 | 1:45.2674 |
| 7 | 10 | (Sweden) Felix Rosenqvist | 2 | 1:45.1487 |
| 8 | 12 | (Australia) Will Power W | 1 | 1:45.2995 |
| 9 | 60 | (United Kingdom) Jack Harvey | 2 | 1:45.5094 |
| 10 | 27 | (United States) Alexander Rossi W | 1 | 1:45.3722 |
| 11 | 18 | (United States) Santino Ferrucci | 2 | 1:45.5676 |
| 12 | 30 | (Japan) Takuma Sato | 1 | 1:45.4320 |
| 13 | 4 | (United States) Charlie Kimball | 2 | 1:45.8344 |
| 14 | 1 | (United States) Josef Newgarden W | 1 | 1:45.4605 |
| 15 | 21 | (Netherlands) Rinus VeeKay R | 2 | 1:46.0330 |
| 16 | 8 | (Sweden) Marcus Ericsson | 1 | 1:45.7852 |
| 17 | 26 | (United States) Zach Veach | 2 | 1:46.1816 |
| 18 | 7 | (United States) Oliver Askew R | 1 | 1:46.0735 |
| 19 | 98 | (United States) Marco Andretti | 2 | 1:46.2213 |
| 20 | 20 | (United States) Conor Daly | 1 | 1:46.4850 |
| 21 | 59 | (United Kingdom) Max Chilton | 2 | 1:46.6091 |
| 22 | 22 | (France) Simon Pagenaud | 1 | 1:46.5734 |
| 23 | 14 | (Canada) Dalton Kellett R | 1 | 1:47.3130 |

=== Race ===
The race took place at 12:40 p.m. EST.

| Pos | No. | Driver | Team | Engine | Laps | Time/Retired | Pit Stops | Grid | Laps Led | Pts.^{1} |
|---|---|---|---|---|---|---|---|---|---|---|
| 1 | 10 | (Sweden) Felix Rosenqvist | Chip Ganassi Racing | Honda | 55 | 1:51:22.0391 | 3 | 7 | 8 | 51 |
| 2 | 5 | (Mexico) Patricio O'Ward | Arrow McLaren SP | Chevrolet | 55 | +2.869 | 3 | 1 | 43 | 44 |
| 3 | 27 | (United States) Alexander Rossi W | Andretti Autosport | Honda | 55 | +8.616 | 3 | 10 | | 35 |
| 4 | 8 | (Sweden) Marcus Ericsson | Chip Ganassi Racing | Honda | 55 | +14.223 | 3 | 16 | | 32 |
| 5 | 88 | (United States) Colton Herta | Andretti Harding Steinbrenner Racing | Honda | 55 | +32.416 | 3 | 2 | | 31 |
| 6 | 18 | (United States) Santino Ferrucci | Dale Coyne Racing w/Vasser-Sullivan | Honda | 55 | +35.888 | 4 | 11 | | 28 |
| 7 | 55 | (Spain) Álex Palou R | Dale Coyne Racing w/Team Goh | Honda | 55 | +36.770 | 3 | 3 | | 26 |
| 8 | 30 | (Japan) Takuma Sato | Rahal Letterman Lanigan Racing | Honda | 55 | +47.943 | 3 | 12 | | 24 |
| 9 | 1 | (United States) Josef Newgarden W | Team Penske | Chevrolet | 55 | +48.786 | 3 | 14 | | 22 |
| 10 | 4 | (United States) Charlie Kimball | A. J. Foyt Enterprises | Chevrolet | 55 | +53.060 | 3 | 13 | | 20 |
| 11 | 12 | (Australia) Will Power W | Team Penske | Chevrolet | 55 | +53.971 | 4 | 8 | 4 | 20 |
| 12 | 9 | (New Zealand) Scott Dixon W | Chip Ganassi Racing | Honda | 55 | +54.534 | 3 | 6 | | 18 |
| 13 | 22 | (France) Simon Pagenaud | Team Penske | Chevrolet | 55 | +56.393 | 3 | 22 | | 17 |
| 14 | 21 | (Netherlands) Rinus VeeKay R | Ed Carpenter Racing | Chevrolet | 55 | +1:00.437 | 3 | 15 | | 16 |
| 15 | 59 | (United Kingdom) Max Chilton | Carlin | Chevrolet | 55 | +1:00.468 | 3 | 21 | | 15 |
| 16 | 26 | (United States) Zach Veach | Andretti Autosport | Honda | 55 | +1:06.835 | 3 | 17 | | 14 |
| 17 | 60 | (United Kingdom) Jack Harvey | Meyer Shank Racing | Honda | 55 | +1:08.295 | 3 | 9 | | 13 |
| 18 | 20 | (United States) Conor Daly | Ed Carpenter Racing | Chevrolet | 55 | +1:45.468 | 7 | 20 | | 12 |
| 19 | 98 | (United States) Marco Andretti | Andretti Herta Autosport w/Marco Andretti and Curb-Agajanian | Honda | 54 | +1 Lap | 3 | 19 | | 11 |
| 20 | 14 | (Canada) Dalton Kellett R | A. J. Foyt Enterprises | Chevrolet | 54 | +1 Lap | 4 | 23 | | 10 |
| 21 | 7 | (United States) Oliver Askew R | Arrow McLaren SP | Chevrolet | 53 | Off course | 4 | 18 | | 9 |
| 22 | 28 | (United States) Ryan Hunter-Reay | Andretti Autosport | Honda | 0 | Contact | 0 | 4 | | 8 |
| 23 | 15 | (United States) Graham Rahal | Rahal Letterman Lanigan Racing | Honda | 0 | Contact | 0 | 5 | | 7 |

=== Race statistics ===
Average speed: 118.942 mph (191.419 km/h)

Lead changes: 8

Lap leader breakdown
| From lap | To lap | Total laps | Driver |
|---|---|---|---|
| 1 | 14 | 14 | Patricio O'Ward |
| 15 | 16 | 2 | Felix Rosenqvist |
| 17 | 20 | 4 | Will Power |
| 21 | 27 | 7 | Patricio O'Ward |
| 28 | 29 | 2 | Felix Rosenqvist |
| 30 | 40 | 11 | Patricio O'Ward |
| 41 | 42 | 2 | Felix Rosenqvist |
| 43 | 53 | 11 | Patricio O'Ward |
| 54 | 55 | 2 | Felix Rosenqvist |

Cautions: 2 for 4 laps
| From lap | To lap | Total laps | Reason |
|---|---|---|---|
| 1 | 3 | 3 | #12 (Power) & #28 (Hunter-Reay) contact turn 1; #12 (Power) & #15 (Rahal) contact turn 3 |
| 6 | 6 | 1 | #12 (Power) spin turn 13 |

=== Championship standings after the race ===
Drivers' Championship standings

| | Pos | Driver | Points |
|---|---|---|---|
| | 1 | (New Zealand) Scott Dixon | 173 |
| 1 | 2 | (United States) Colton Herta | 119 |
| 1 | 3 | (France) Simon Pagenaud | 110 |
| 4 | 4 | (Mexico) Patricio O'Ward | 110 |
| 1 | 5 | (United States) Josef Newgarden | 106 |

| Previous race: 2020 IndyCar Grand Prix | IndyCar Series; 2020 season | Next race: 2020 Iowa IndyCar 250s |
| Previous race: 2019 REV Group Grand Prix at Road America | REV Group Grand Prix at Road America | Next race: 2021 REV Group Grand Prix at Road America |
