= IndyCar iRacing Challenge =

2020 series of esports events

INDYCAR iRacing Challenge
- 2020

Tournament information
- Sport: IndyCar
- Dates: 28 March 2020–2 May 2020
- Administrator: IndyCar
- Host: iRacing

Final positions
- Champion: (New Zealand) Scott McLaughlin

The IndyCar iRacing Challenge (stylized as INDYCAR iRacing Challenge) was a series of esports events held as a temporary replacement of the suspended 2020 IndyCar Series due to the COVID-19 pandemic. The series was run on the platform of iRacing. The virtual races were broadcast on various IndyCar social media channels. Additionally, all races, but the first one, were broadcast live on NBCSN.

The races featured full time and part time drivers currently on the Indycar grid. They also featured guest drivers from other racing series' like Formula One and NASCAR.

== Teams and Drivers ==
Team	No.	Driver(s)	Round(s)
A. J. Foyt Enterprises	4	(France) Sébastien Bourdais	All
A. J. Foyt Enterprises	14	(Brazil) Tony Kanaan	All
A. J. Foyt Enterprises	41	(Canada) Dalton Kellett	All
Andretti Autosport	26	(United States) Zach Veach	All
Andretti Autosport	27	(United States) Alexander Rossi	All
Andretti Autosport	28	(United States) Kyle Kirkwood	1-2
Andretti Autosport	28	(United States) Ryan Hunter-Reay	3-6
Andretti Autosport	29	(Canada) James Hinchcliffe	All
Andretti Autosport	39	(United States) Scott Speed	6
Andretti Herta Autosport w/ Marco Andretti & Curb-Agajanian	98	(United States) Scott Speed	1-2
Andretti Herta Autosport w/ Marco Andretti & Curb-Agajanian	98	(United States) Marco Andretti	3-4, 6
Andretti Herta Autosport w/ Marco Andretti & Curb-Agajanian	98	(Australia) Chaz Mostert	5
Andretti Harding Steinbrenner Autosport	88	(United States) Colton Herta	All
Arrow McLaren SP
Arrow McLaren SP	04	(United Kingdom) Lando Norris	5-6
Arrow McLaren SP	5	(Mexico) Patricio O'Ward	All
Arrow McLaren SP	6	(Canada) Robert Wickens	4
Arrow McLaren SP	7	(United States) Oliver Askew	All
Carlin	31	(United States) Conor Daly	6
Carlin	31	(Brazil) Felipe Nasr	3-5
Carlin	59	(Brazil) Felipe Nasr	1-2
Carlin	59	(United Kingdom) Max Chilton	3-6
Chip Ganassi Racing	8	(Sweden) Marcus Ericsson	All
Chip Ganassi Racing	9	(New Zealand) Scott Dixon	2-6
Chip Ganassi Racing	10	(Sweden) Felix Rosenqvist	All
Dale Coyne Racing with Team Goh	55	(Spain) Álex Palou	All
Dale Coyne Racing with Vasser-Sullivan	18	(United States) Santino Ferrucci	All
Dale Coyne Racing with Byrd & Belardi	33	(Australia) James Davison	3, 6
Dreyer & Reinbold Racing	24	(United States) Sage Karam	All
Ed Carpenter Racing	20	(United States) Ed Carpenter	6
Ed Carpenter Racing	20	(United States) Conor Daly	1-5
Ed Carpenter Racing	21	(Netherlands) Rinus VeeKay	4-6
Ed Carpenter Racing	21	(United States) Ed Carpenter	2-3
Ed Carpenter Racing	50	(United States) Ed Carpenter	4-5
IndyCar Provisional	3	(United States) Dale Earnhardt Jr.	3
IndyCar Provisional	48	(United States) Jimmie Johnson	1-2
IndyCar Provisional	51	(United States) Kyle Busch	4
Juncos Racing	11	(United States) Kyle Kaiser	1-5
Juncos Racing	25	(United Kingdom) Stefan Wilson	6
Meyer Shank Racing	60	(United Kingdom) Jack Harvey	2-6
Rahal Letterman Lanigan Racing	15	(United States) Graham Rahal	All
Rahal Letterman Lanigan Racing	30	(Japan) Takuma Sato	4-6
Rahal Letterman Lanigan Racing with Citrone/Buhl Autosport	45	(United States) Spencer Pigot	5
Team Penske	1	(United States) Josef Newgarden	All
Team Penske	12	(Australia) Will Power	All
Team Penske	22	(France) Simon Pagenaud	All
Team Penske	2	(New Zealand) Scott McLaughlin	1-5
Team Penske	40	(New Zealand) Scott McLaughlin	6
Team Penske	3	(Brazil) Hélio Castroneves	4
Team Penske	911	(Brazil) Hélio Castroneves	6
Top Gun Racing	99	(United States) RC Enerson	6

== Schedule ==
Rd.	Date	Race name	Track	Location
1	March 28	American Red Cross Grand Prix	R Watkins Glen International	Watkins Glen, New York
2	April 4	Honda Indy Grand Prix of Alabama Presented by AmFirst	R Barber Motorsports Park	Birmingham, Alabama
3	April 11	Chevrolet 275	O Michigan International Speedway	Brooklyn, Michigan
4	April 18	Firestone 175	O Twin Ring Motegi	Motegi, Japan
5	April 25	AutoNation IndyCar Challenge	R Circuit of the Americas	Austin, Texas
6	May 2	First Responder 175	O Indianapolis Motor Speedway	Speedway, Indiana

O Short oval/Superspeedway
R Road/street course

== Results ==
Rd.	Race	Pole position	Fastest lap	Most laps led	Race Winner	
Rd.	Race	Pole position	Fastest lap	Most laps led	Driver	Team
1	Watkins Glen	(United States) Sage Karam	(Australia) Will Power	(United States) Sage Karam	(United States) Sage Karam	Dreyer & Reinbold Racing
2	Barber	(United States) Sage Karam	(Sweden) Felix Rosenqvist	(United States) Sage Karam	(New Zealand) Scott McLaughlin	Team Penske
3	Michigan	(Sweden) Marcus Ericsson	(United States) Dale Earnhardt Jr.	(United States) Sage Karam	(France) Simon Pagenaud	Team Penske
4	Motegi	(Canada) Robert Wickens	(United States) Sage Karam	(Australia) Will Power	(France) Simon Pagenaud	Team Penske
5	COTA	(United Kingdom) Lando Norris	(United Kingdom) Lando Norris	(United Kingdom) Lando Norris	(United Kingdom) Lando Norris	Arrow McLaren SP
6	Indianapolis	(New Zealand) Scott McLaughlin	(United Kingdom) Stefan Wilson	(Australia) Will Power	(New Zealand) Scott McLaughlin	Team Penske

== Driver Standings ==
Pos	Driver	WGI	ALA	MIS	MOT	COTA	INDY	Pts
1	(New Zealand) Scott McLaughlin	4	1^{L}	2	24	4	**1**^{L}	213
2	(Australia) Will Power	3^{L}	2	4^{L}	3^{L}*	6^{L}	14^{L}*	195
3	(France) Simon Pagenaud	6	5	1^{L}	1^{L}	14	25^{L}	182
4	(Sweden) Felix Rosenqvist	2	6^{L}	21	14	3	9	152
5	(United States) Santino Ferrucci	8	10	23	9	5	3	138
6	(United States) Sage Karam	**1**^{L}*	**23**^{L}*	14^{L}*	7^{L}	33	27^{L}	120
7	(United States) Graham Rahal	14	14	5	10	17	13^{L}	113
8	(United States) Conor Daly	10	23	13	11	29	2	108
9	(Sweden) Marcus Ericsson	18	25	**19**^{L}	4^{L}	8	11^{L}	107
10	(Mexico) Patricio O'Ward	13	24	25	26	2^{L}	5	104
11	(Spain) Álex Palou	20	4	10^{L}	22	9^{L}	26^{L}	100
12	(New Zealand) Scott Dixon		16	30	2	11^{L}	10	99
13	(United States) Oliver Askew	5	15	31	21^{L}	28	4^{L}	98
14	(United States) Josef Newgarden	7	9	24	15^{L}	10	22	98
15	(United States) Zach Veach	19	19	11^{L}	8^{L}	26	8	96
16	(United Kingdom) Jack Harvey		28	6	6^{L}	16	18	88
17	(United States) Alexander Rossi	17	22	7^{L}	28	15	12	86
18	(Canada) Dalton Kellett	11	11	16	19	18	31	80
19	(France) Sébastien Bourdais	23	13	20	20	24	6^{L}	79
20	(United States) Colton Herta	22	7	28	18	13	32	73
21	(United States) Ryan Hunter-Reay			8^{L}	16	31	7	70
22	(Canada) Robert Wickens		8	26	**5**^{L}	32	DNQ	66
23	(United Kingdom) Lando Norris					**1**^{L}*	21	64
24	(United States) Scott Speed	21	3				15	61
25	(United States) Ed Carpenter		18	9	17	22	28	60
26	(Brazil) Felipe Nasr	15	29	17^{L}	31	12	DNQ	57
27	(United States) Kyle Kaiser	12	21	12	27	27	DNQ	55
28	(Brazil) Tony Kanaan	24	26	18	30	23	33	40
29	(Netherlands) Rinus Veekay				23	7	24	39
30	(United States) Dale Earnhardt Jr.			3				35
31	(United States) Kyle Kirkwood	9	20					32
32	(United States) Jimmie Johnson	16	12					32
33	(Canada) James Hinchcliffe	DNS	17	22	DNS	19	30	28
34	(Japan) Takuma Sato				12	30	30	28
35	(Australia) James Davison			15			19	27
36	(United Kingdom) Max Chilton			27	32	21	23	26
37F	(United States) Marco Andretti			29	25		17	23
38	(Brazil) Hélio Castroneves				29		16	19
39	(United States) Kyle Busch				13		DNQ	17
40	(Australia) Chaz Mostert					20		10
40	(United States) RC Enerson						20	10
42	(United States) Spencer Pigot					25	DNQ	5
42	(United Kingdom) Stefan Wilson						29	5
Pos	Driver	WGI	ALA	MIS	MOT	COTA	INDY	Pts

Color	Result
Gold	Winner
Silver	2nd-place finish
Bronze	3rd-place finish
Green	Top 5 finish
Light Blue	Top 10 finish
Dark Blue	Other flagged position
Purple	Did not finish
Red	Did not qualify (DNQ)
Brown	Withdrew (Wth)
Black	Disqualified (DSQ)
White	Did Not Start (DNS)
White	Race abandoned (C)
Blank	Did not participate

**In-line notation**
**Bold**	Pole position (1 point; except Indy)
Italics	Ran fastest race lap
^{L}	Led race lap (1 point)
*	Led most race laps (2 points)

== Indianapolis race controversy ==
The final race of the series, the First Responder 175, saw a driving standards controversy. With nine laps to go in the race, Simon Pagenaud had been leading, only for him to run into the wall. Pagenaud pitted following the crash and while on the pits, told over the radio "We take out Lando [Norris], let's do it", in reference to an earlier incident they had during the race. With two laps to go, Pagenaud, who was slowing down, promptly collided with Norris, who was leading at the time of the incident. Heading into the finish line, Santino Ferrucci took a hard left into then-leader Oliver Askew, who flipped; Scott McLaughlin crossed the finish line, from the pole.

Both Pagenaud and Ferrucci received criticism for their poor conduct during the race. Norris alleged that Pagenaud did so in order to prevent a non-IndyCar Series regular from winning the race; McLaren CEO Zak Brown tweeted that what Pagenaud did was not something expected from a former Indy 500 champion. Pagenaud insisted that he only intended to impede Norris, while his spotter Ben Bretzman denied instructing Pagenaud to crash into Norris. Ferrucci, in denying that his collision was deliberate, claimed that his collision at the end of the last lap was an attempt at a NASCAR-style side drafting, although during the stream he quipped that his clash was "worth it" and he did it "for the fans". Although iRacing's sporting code explicitly prohibited deliberate behavior, iRacing did not penalize both drivers, as it was deemed as a private league organized by INDYCAR themselves, rather than iRacing; INDYCAR themselves did not issue penalties for both Pagenaud or Ferrucci. Motorsport journalist Marshall Pruett later confirmed that an unnamed party involved in the incidents had also received death threats.
