= Citrone/Buhl Autosport =

American IndyCar Series racing team

(United States) Citrone/Buhl Autosport
- Founded: 2019
- Founder(s): Robert Citrone; Nick Citrone; Robbie Buhl; Tom Buhl
- Folded: 2020
- Base: Detroit, Michigan, United States
- Team principal(s): Robbie Buhl
- Current series: IndyCar Series
- Noted drivers: (United States) Spencer Pigot

Citrone/Buhl Autosport was an American racing team, that competed in the NTT IndyCar Series with Rahal Letterman Lanigan Racing as technical team and Spencer Pigot as a driver.

The team was created after a friendship of over 20 years by Robert Citrone, who is a co-founder of Discovery Capital Management and minority owners at the Pittsburgh Steelers, and Robbie Buhl. In 2016, Robbie, along with his brother Tom Buhl, started Buhl Sport Detroit, a motorsports marketing company, professional race team, and teen driving program based in Detroit, Michigan. Buhl's racing team, Racing4Detroit, ran in the Americas Rallycross Championship in 2018 and 2019, with Alex Keyes as the racing driver.

== History ==
=== IndyCar ===
On February 27, 2020, the newly formed team announces its participation in the GMR Grand Prix and the Indy 500 in May, with American Spencer Pigot as driver, Due to the coronavirus pandemic, the rounds set in May were moved to June and August.

== Racing results ==
=== IndyCar Series ===
(key)

Year	Chassis	Engine	Drivers	No.	1	2	3	4	5	6	7	8	9	10	11	12	13	14	Pos.	Pts.
Rahal Letterman Lanigan Racing with Citrone/Buhl Autosport
2020					TEX	IMS	ROA	ROA	IOW	IOW	INDY	GTW	GTW	MDO	MDO	IMS	IMS	STP		
2020	Dallara DW12	Honda HI20TT V6t	(United States) Spencer Pigot	45		24					25								32nd	17

* Season still in progress
