= 2020 IndyCar Series =

American auto racing season

2020 IndyCar season
- NTT IndyCar Series

Season
- Races: 14
- Start date: June 6
- End date: October 25

Awards
- Drivers' champion: (New Zealand) Scott Dixon
- Manufacturers' Cup: (Japan) Honda
- Rookie of the Year: (Netherlands) Rinus VeeKay
- Indianapolis 500 winner: (Japan) Takuma Sato

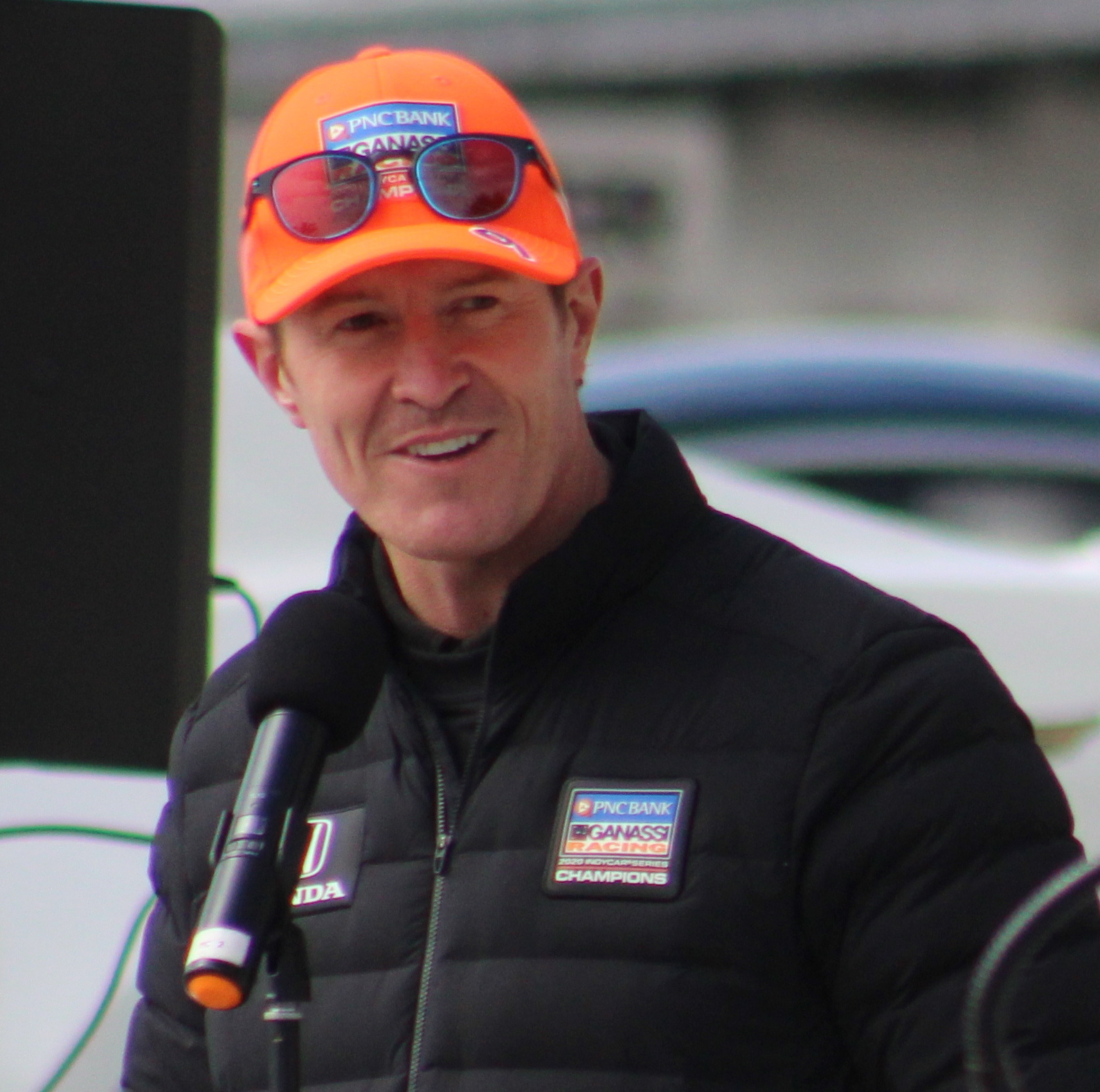
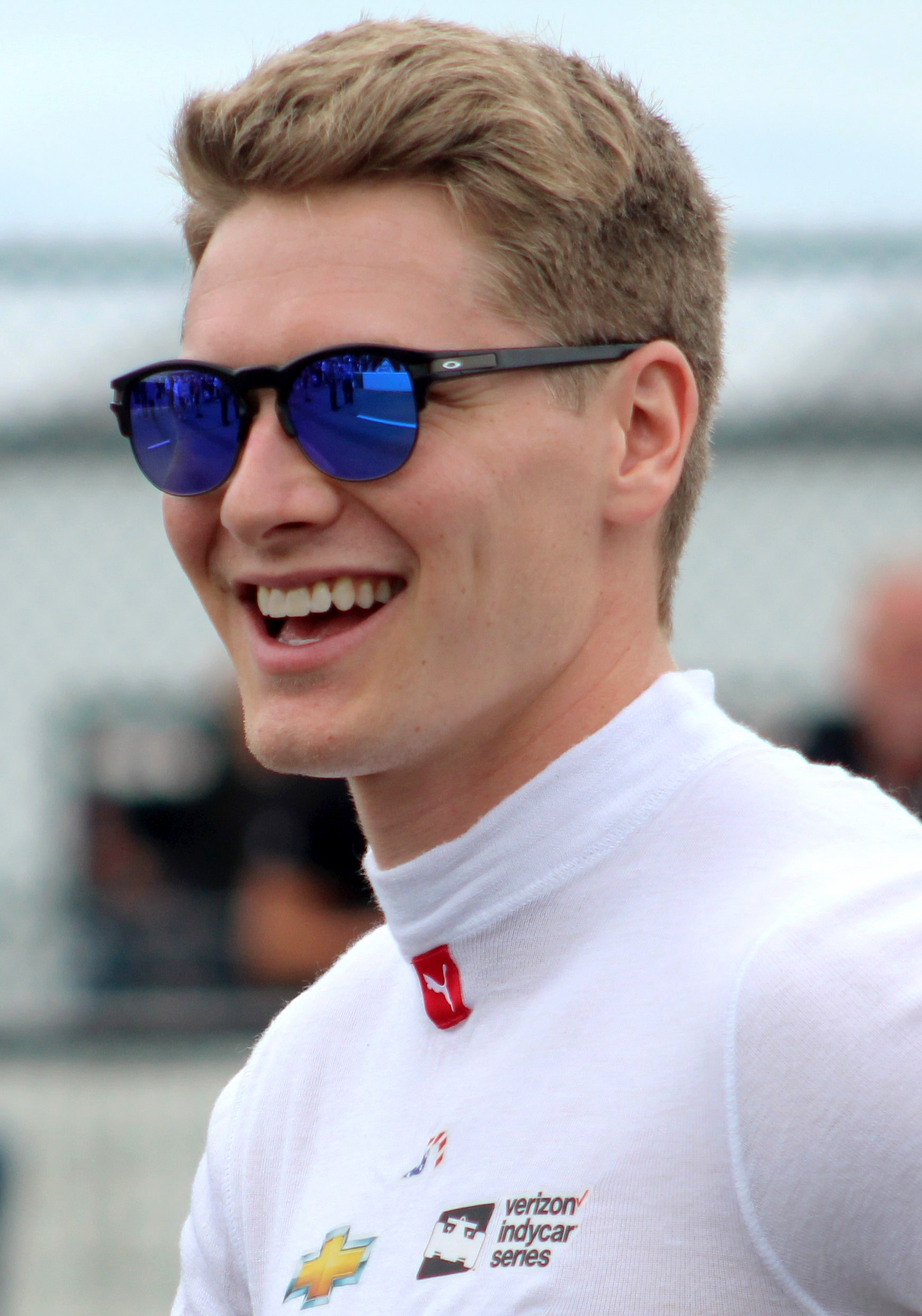
Scott Dixon (left) won his sixth series championship while Josef Newgarden (right) finished second in the championship.

The 2020 NTT IndyCar Series was the 25th season of the IndyCar Series and the 109th official championship season of American open-wheel racing. The premier event was the 2020 Indianapolis 500. Josef Newgarden entered the season as the defending National Champion. Honda entered as defending Manufacturers' Cup champion for the second consecutive season. It was the first year under Penske management after they took over in late 2019.

== Series news ==
- On May 24, 2019, it was announced that the IndyCar Series would introduce cockpit protection, combining an Aeroscreen and the Halo used in Formula One, from the 2020 season onwards. The cockpit protection was built by Red Bull Advanced Technologies in a collaborative effort with Dallara. The combination of aeroscreen and halo is designed to improve safety standards by deflecting debris away from a driver's head and was originally developed for use in Formula One and IndyCar before its application was expanded to other open-wheel championships.
- On November 3, 2019, it was announced the Team Penske owner Roger Penske had purchased IndyCar, LLC and the Indianapolis Motor Speedway. Penske also announced he will step down as full-time race strategist. On January 6, 2020, IndyCar announced the transactions were formally complete. Penske officially becomes just the fourth owner in Indianapolis Motor Speedway's history and marks the first time since 1945 where ownership of the Speedway has changed hands.

== Confirmed entries ==
The following teams, entries, and drivers have been announced to compete in the 2020 NTT IndyCar Series season. All teams will use a spec Dallara DW12 chassis with UAK18 aero kit and Firestone tires.

Team	Engine	No.	Driver(s)	Round(s)
A. J. Foyt Enterprises	Chevrolet	4	(United States) Charlie Kimball	All
A. J. Foyt Enterprises	Chevrolet	14	(Brazil) Tony Kanaan	1, 5–9
A. J. Foyt Enterprises	Chevrolet	14	(France) Sébastien Bourdais	12–14
A. J. Foyt Enterprises	Chevrolet	14	(Canada) Dalton Kellett R	2–4, 10–11
A. J. Foyt Enterprises	Chevrolet	41	(Canada) Dalton Kellett R	7, 12–13
Andretti Autosport	Honda	26	(United States) Zach Veach	1–11
Andretti Autosport	Honda	26	(Canada) James Hinchcliffe	12–14
Andretti Autosport	Honda	27	(United States) Alexander Rossi	All
Andretti Autosport	Honda	28	(United States) Ryan Hunter-Reay	All
Andretti Autosport	Honda	29	(Canada) James Hinchcliffe	1–2, 7
Andretti Harding Steinbrenner Autosport	Honda	88	(United States) Colton Herta	All
Andretti Herta Autosport w/ Marco & Curb-Agajanian	Honda	98	(United States) Marco Andretti	All
Arrow McLaren SP	Chevrolet	5	(Mexico) Pato O'Ward	All
Arrow McLaren SP	Chevrolet	7	(United States) Oliver Askew R	1–11, 14
Arrow McLaren SP	Chevrolet	7	(Brazil) Hélio Castroneves	12–13
Arrow McLaren SP	Chevrolet	66	(Spain) Fernando Alonso R (Note: Fernando Alonso is considered a rookie in the IndyCar Series; however, he will not be a rookie in the 2020 Indianapolis 500 as he participated in the 2017 Indianapolis 500.)	7
Carlin	Chevrolet	59	(United States) Conor Daly	1, 5–6, 8–9
Carlin	Chevrolet	59	(United Kingdom) Max Chilton	2–4, 7, 10–14
Chip Ganassi Racing	Honda	8	(Sweden) Marcus Ericsson	All
Chip Ganassi Racing	Honda	9	(New Zealand) Scott Dixon	All
Chip Ganassi Racing	Honda	10	(Sweden) Felix Rosenqvist	All
Dale Coyne Racing w/ Rick Ware Racing, Byrd & Belardi	Honda	51	(Australia) James Davison R (Note: James Davison is considered a rookie in the IndyCar Series; however, he will not be a rookie in the 2020 Indianapolis 500 as he participated in the 2014, 2015, 2017, 2018, and 2019 Indianapolis 500.)	7
Dale Coyne Racing with Team Goh	Honda	55	(Spain) Álex Palou R	All
Dale Coyne Racing with Vasser Sullivan	Honda	18	(United States) Santino Ferrucci	All
DragonSpeed USA	Chevrolet	81	(United Kingdom) Ben Hanley R (Note: Ben Hanley is considered a rookie in the IndyCar Series; however, he will not be a rookie in the 2020 Indianapolis 500 as he participated in the 2019 Indianapolis 500.)	7
Dreyer & Reinbold Racing	Chevrolet	24	(United States) Sage Karam	2, 7, 12–13
Dreyer & Reinbold Racing	Chevrolet	67 (Note: Dreyer and Reinbold have previously used the No. 48, but that number was bought by Arrow McLaren SP on March 5, 2020.)	(United States) J. R. Hildebrand	7
Ed Carpenter Racing	Chevrolet	20	(United States) Ed Carpenter	1, 5–9
Ed Carpenter Racing	Chevrolet	20	(United States) Conor Daly	2–4, 10–14
Ed Carpenter Racing	Chevrolet	21	(Netherlands) Rinus VeeKay R	All
Ed Carpenter Racing	Chevrolet	47	(United States) Conor Daly	7
Meyer Shank Racing (Note: Technical partnership with Andretti Autosport.)	Honda	60	(United Kingdom) Jack Harvey	All
Rahal Letterman Lanigan Racing	Honda	15	(United States) Graham Rahal	All
Rahal Letterman Lanigan Racing	Honda	30	(Japan) Takuma Sato	All
RLL with Citrone/Buhl Autosport	Honda	45	(United States) Spencer Pigot	2, 7
Team Penske	Chevrolet	1	(United States) Josef Newgarden	All
Team Penske	Chevrolet	3	(Brazil) Hélio Castroneves	7
Team Penske	Chevrolet	3	(New Zealand) Scott McLaughlin R	14
Team Penske	Chevrolet	12	(Australia) Will Power	All
Team Penske	Chevrolet	22	(France) Simon Pagenaud	All

R Eligible for Rookie of the Year

=== Team changes ===
- Formula One team McLaren Racing announced on August 1, 2019, it would join the series in 2020 in partnership with Arrow Schmidt Peterson Motorsports under the name Arrow McLaren Racing SP. The team will field two full-time entries. As a result of McLaren partnership, the team officially agreed to end its engine partner deal with Honda to allow Chevrolet to supply Schmidt Peterson Motorsports team as it was announced on August 9, 2019. On October 25, 2019, the joint venture unveiled a new logo and confirmed the team's name as Arrow McLaren SP.
- On September 21, 2019, it was announced that Andretti Autosport would field a fifth entry for Colton Herta under the name Andretti Harding Steinbrenner Autosport, partnering with Mike Harding and George Michael Steinbrenner IV of the previously independent team Harding Steinbrenner Racing.
- On November 8, 2019, Meyer Shank Racing, after competing part-time in 2017, 2018, and 2019, announced that they would expand to a full-time program in 2020 with Jack Harvey. The team retained its Honda power and entered a technical partnership with Andretti Technologies after 2 years partnering with Schmidt Peterson Motorsports.
- On December 19, 2019, Dale Coyne Racing announced a partnership with 2004 24 Hours of Le Mans winners Team Goh to run Álex Palou for the full season.
- On December 24, 2019, DragonSpeed released a schedule of six races for 2020, including the 104th Indianapolis 500. While 2019 driver Ben Hanley had previously been tipped to return, the December announcement did not confirm any drivers. On January 13, 2020, it was announced that Hanley would drive for DragonSpeed at the first round in St. Petersburg. On May 20, 2020, David Malsher-Lopez from Motorsport.com reported that DragonSpeed were revising their IndyCar schedule to start at the Indianapolis 500, with additional races depending on their concurrent European Le Mans Series and WeatherTech SportsCar Championship commitments.
- On January 7, 2020, Dreyer & Reinbold Racing revealed to RACER that they would be expanding to a 4-race program in 2020. Team owner Dennis Reinbold revealed that Sage Karam would be back with the team in 2020, but did not specify how many rounds, or which rounds, Karam would be entering. On January 10, 2020, in an interview with IndyStar, Reinbold clarified that Karam would be driving their car in the rounds at St. Petersburg, Indianapolis, and Toronto.
- On February 21, 2020, Citrone/Buhl Autosport, a partnership between Nick and Robert Citrone and Tom and Robbie Buhl, announced their intentions to partner with an existing team to enter the IndyCar Series at the GMR Grand Prix and attempt to qualify for the 2020 Indianapolis 500. On February 27, 2020, Rahal Letterman Lanigan Racing announced a partnership with Citrone/Buhl Autosport and Spencer Pigot will drive their entry in the GMR Grand Prix and the Indianapolis 500.
- On June 2, 2020, Carlin announced that its No. 31 entry would not race at Texas due to funding issues.

=== Driver changes ===
- On October 8, 2019 Chip Ganassi Racing announced that Marcus Ericsson would join the team, leaving Arrow Schmidt Peterson Motorsports to drive the revived No. 8 car in 2020.
- On October 28, 2019 Arrow McLaren SP relieved James Hinchcliffe of his driving duties and signed 2019 Indy Lights champion Oliver Askew and former Carlin driver and 2018 Indy Lights champion Pato O'Ward to fill their two seats.
- On November 15, 2019, Ed Carpenter Racing announced that Spencer Pigot would not be returning to the team in 2020. On November 20, ECR announced Rinus VeeKay had been signed to drive the No. 21 full-time.
- On November 22, 2019, it was announced that Sébastien Bourdais would not return to Dale Coyne Racing with Vasser Sullivan due to a new need for funding. The same day, Bourdais confirmed his exit from the IndyCar Series after signing to drive for JDC-Miller Motorsports in the 2020 WeatherTech SportsCar Championship. On January 23, 2020, the team announced that Santino Ferrucci, who drove the No. 19 car for Dale Coyne Racing in 2019, would switch to the Vasser-Sullivan-supported No. 18 entry to replace Bourdais.
- On December 9, 2019, Ed Carpenter Racing announced that Conor Daly would contest the road and street circuit races in the team's No. 20 entry with sponsorship from the United States Air Force, and would pilot a third entry for the team in the Indianapolis 500. He replaces Ed Jones, who will drive for Audi Sport Team WRT in the 2020 DTM season. Daly will also compete the five other oval events in Carlin's No. 59, replacing Max Chilton who quit racing ovals in 2019.
- On January 22, 2020, A. J. Foyt Enterprises named Charlie Kimball the driver of their No. 4 entry, marking his return to full-time competition after running a partial schedule for Carlin in 2019.
- On January 29, 2020, Tony Kanaan announced that 2020 would be his final season as a primary driver in IndyCar. He will race in the six oval events in the No. 14 for A. J. Foyt Enterprises. On February 4, 2020 A. J. Foyt Enterprises confirmed that driving duties for the No. 14 on the road and street tracks would be split between Sébastien Bourdais and Dalton Kellett. Kellett will also drive the team's third entry in the Indianapolis 500.
- On February 5, 2020, Team Penske confirmed that defending Supercars champion Scott McLaughlin (a driver for the Supercars team Penske co-owned at the time) would make his IndyCar debut at the GMR Grand Prix on the Indianapolis road course. Hélio Castroneves, who drove a fourth Penske car at both Indianapolis races in 2018 and 2019, will only race in the 2020 Indianapolis 500 for Penske. On March 27, 2020, it was revealed that McLaughlin would no longer be making his IndyCar debut at the GMR Grand Prix due to the rescheduling of the race. On September 17, it was confirmed that McLaughlin would make his debut in the final race of the season in St. Petersburg.
- On February 19, 2020, Andretti Autosport announced that James Hinchcliffe would race in three events in the team's No. 29 entry with sponsorship from Genesys. He will be driving at the GMR Grand Prix, the Indianapolis 500 and the Genesys 600.
- On February 25, 2020, Fernando Alonso, who attempted to qualify for the Indianapolis 500 with McLaren Racing in 2019, announced that he would be driving for Arrow McLaren SP at the 2020 Indianapolis 500.
- On March 10, 2020, Carlin announced that Felipe Nasr, who races full-time with Action Express Racing in the 2020 WeatherTech SportsCar Championship, would make his IndyCar debut in St. Petersburg.
- On September 23, 2020, Andretti Autosport announced that Zach Veach would leave the team ahead of the Harvest Grand Prix. On September 25, the team announced that James Hinchcliffe would take over the No. 26 entry for the remainder of the season.
- On September 24, 2020, Arrow McLaren SP announced that Oliver Askew has not been medically cleared to drive the Harvest Grand Prix after Askew reported balance and coordination issues after the round at Mid-Ohio. The team subsequently announced that Hélio Castroneves would fill in for Askew at the Harvest Grand Prix.

== Schedule ==
The 17-race schedule for 2020 was initially announced on September 1, 2019; there was one change from the 2019 IndyCar Series calendar with Pocono Raceway being replaced by Richmond Raceway, the latter track returning to the series for the first time since 2009. As a result of the COVID-19 pandemic, ten races were cancelled (including the Detroit doubleheader and a makeshift second race at Laguna Seca), five rescheduled, and six replacement races added.

During the delay to start the season, many of the IndyCar series drivers participated in the INDYCAR iRacing Challenge.

Icon	Legend
O	Oval/Speedway
R	Road course
S	Street circuit

Rd.	Date	Race name	Track	City
1	June 6	Genesys 300	O Texas Motor Speedway	Fort Worth, Texas
2	July 4	GMR Grand Prix	R Indianapolis Motor Speedway Road Course	Speedway, Indiana
3	July 11	REV Group Grand Prix presented by AMR Doubleheader	R Road America	Elkhart Lake, Wisconsin
4	July 12	REV Group Grand Prix presented by AMR Doubleheader	R Road America	Elkhart Lake, Wisconsin
5	July 17	Iowa INDYCAR 250s	O Iowa Speedway	Newton, Iowa
6	July 18	Iowa INDYCAR 250s	O Iowa Speedway	Newton, Iowa
7	August 23	104th Running of the Indianapolis 500 presented by Gainbridge	O Indianapolis Motor Speedway	Speedway, Indiana
8	August 29	Bommarito Automotive Group 500 presented by Axalta and Valvoline	O World Wide Technology Raceway	Madison, Illinois
9	August 30	Bommarito Automotive Group 500 presented by Axalta and Valvoline	O World Wide Technology Raceway	Madison, Illinois
10	September 12	Honda Indy 200 at Mid-Ohio	R Mid-Ohio Sports Car Course	Lexington, Ohio
11	September 13	Honda Indy 200 at Mid-Ohio	R Mid-Ohio Sports Car Course	Lexington, Ohio
12	October 2	INDYCAR Harvest GP	R Indianapolis Motor Speedway Road Course	Speedway, Indiana
13	October 3	INDYCAR Harvest GP	R Indianapolis Motor Speedway Road Course	Speedway, Indiana
14	October 25	Firestone Grand Prix of St. Petersburg	S Streets of St. Petersburg	St. Petersburg, Florida

=== Schedule changes due to the COVID-19 pandemic ===
The onset of the COVID-19 pandemic in North America, and subsequent restrictions on public gatherings and non-essential business (which have affected all sports worldwide), led to the postponement of the IndyCar Series season to June, and the cancellation of several races.

On March 12, 2020, IndyCar announced that the opening Grand Prix of St. Petersburg would be held with no spectators and essential personnel only. However, the next day (March 13), IndyCar announced that the event, as well as all races through April, would be cancelled, citing widening closures and health risks of gatherings. The series announced an intent to begin with the two "Month of May" races in Indianapolis which would have been the first time since the 1957 season that IMS would begin the season.

That did not occur however, because on March 26, IndyCar announced that it would postpone the GMR Grand Prix and Indianapolis 500 to July 4 and August 23 respectively (with the former joining NASCAR's Brickyard 400 race weekend), marking the first time either event would be held outside of May. The Detroit Grand Prix was to serve as season opener, while plans were announced for the St. Petersburg race to possibly be reinstated.

On April 6, IndyCar announced the cancellation of the Detroit Grand Prix, with organizers citing Michigan's stay-at-home order and other scheduled events at Belle Isle making it impossible to prepare for or reschedule the event. To compensate for other cancelled races, IndyCar also announced the conversion of the Iowa 300 and Monterey Grand Prix races to double-header weekends, and added a third Indianapolis Motor Speedway race on October 3 as part of the USAC-sanctioned Intercontinental GT Challenge endurance race meeting on the road course.

On May 7, it was announced that the season would commence with a condensed, one-day event format at Texas Motor Speedway, with no spectators in attendance. The race, initially scheduled for 248 laps or around 600 kilometres (370 miles), was shortened to 200 laps or around 300 miles (480 kilometres). As well as this, extensive social distancing protocols related to the COVID-19 pandemic were announced for team personnel, as well as provisions for the use of personal protective equipment (PPE). On May 27, it was announced that tire stints during the Genesys 300 would be limited to a maximum of 35 laps, as unused tires from the 2019 DXC Technology 600 were utilized for the race weekend. This had occurred previously, during the final third of the 2017 Rainguard Water Sealers 600, where a 30-lap maximum was implemented with competition cautions.

On May 13, IndyCar announced that the Firestone Grand Prix of St. Petersburg would be held as the season finale on October 25, eventually becoming the only street course race on the schedule.

On May 15, the promoters of the Honda Indy Toronto announced that the race scheduled for July 12 would be postponed.

On May 21, IndyCar announced further changes to the schedule. The round at Road America was moved to July and became a doubleheader weekend, the previously postponed Toronto race was cancelled, and the Richmond round was cancelled.

On June 4, IMS announced that all events during the Brickyard 400 weekend, including the GMR Grand Prix, would be held with no spectators.

On July 15, IndyCar announced a new qualifying format for the Iowa IndyCar 250s where the first lap would set the drivers starting spot for race 1 and the second lap would set the drivers starting spot for race 2.

On July 22, it was announced that the Indianapolis 500 would be further capped at 25% capacity.

On July 27, the round at Portland and double-header rounds at Laguna Seca were canceled. To fill the gaps in the schedule, the rounds at Mid-Ohio, Gateway, and the Harvest GP at the Indianapolis road course were converted into double-header rounds. The double-header road course qualifying format was announced to be utilized once more at Mid-Ohio and Indianapolis, while the double-header oval qualifying format used at Iowa would also be used at Gateway.

On August 1, IndyCar officials, Mid-Ohio track officials, and the promoter of the race at Mid-Ohio announced that the doubleheader at Mid-Ohio would be postponed to later in the season due to an uptick in COVID-19 cases in Ohio. On September 5, the series announced the race would go ahead as a doubleheader event on September 12–13.

On August 4, citing increases in COVID-19 cases in Marion County, Indiana, it was announced that the Indianapolis 500 would be closed to the public.

==== Cancelled events ====
Icon	Legend
O	Oval/Speedway
R	Road course
S	Street circuit

Race name	Track	City	Original date
Honda Indy Grand Prix of Alabama	R Barber Motorsports Park	Birmingham, Alabama	April 5
Acura Grand Prix of Long Beach	S Streets of Long Beach	Long Beach, California	April 19
AutoNation IndyCar Challenge	R Circuit of the Americas	Austin, Texas	April 26
Chevrolet Detroit Grand Prix presented by Lear Corporation	S The Raceway at Belle Isle Park	Detroit, Michigan	May 30
Chevrolet Detroit Grand Prix presented by Lear Corporation	S The Raceway at Belle Isle Park	Detroit, Michigan	May 31
Indy Richmond 300	O Richmond Raceway	Richmond, Virginia	June 27
Honda Indy Toronto	S Exhibition Place	Toronto, Ontario	July 12
Grand Prix of Portland	R Portland International Raceway	Portland, Oregon	September 13
Firestone Grand Prix of Monterey	R WeatherTech Raceway Laguna Seca	Monterey, California	September 19
Firestone Grand Prix of Monterey	R WeatherTech Raceway Laguna Seca	Monterey, California	September 20

== Results ==
Rd.	Race	Pole position	Fastest lap	Most laps led	Race Winner			Report
Rd.	Race	Pole position	Fastest lap	Most laps led	Driver	Team	Manufacturer	Report
1	Texas	(United States) Josef Newgarden	(Sweden) Felix Rosenqvist	(New Zealand) Scott Dixon	(New Zealand) Scott Dixon	Chip Ganassi Racing	Honda	Report
2	Indianapolis GP	(Australia) Will Power	(New Zealand) Scott Dixon	(Australia) Will Power	(New Zealand) Scott Dixon	Chip Ganassi Racing	Honda	Report
3	Road America 1	(United States) Josef Newgarden (Note: The qualification format for this race featured two separate qualification groups, with the fastest qualifier in each group earning a championship point; the faster of the two group fastest qualifiers would then start on pole, while the other would start from the outside of the front row. Newgarden set the fastest overall lap, and was awarded the pole position. Jack Harvey set the fastest lap in the other qualifying group, and was also awarded a championship point.)	(United States) Marco Andretti	(United States) Josef Newgarden	(New Zealand) Scott Dixon	Chip Ganassi Racing	Honda	Report
4	Road America 2	(Mexico) Pato O'Ward (Note: The qualification format for this race featured two separate qualification groups, with the fastest qualifier in each group earning a championship point; the faster of the two group fastest qualifiers would then start on pole, while the other would start from the outside of the front row. O'Ward set the fastest overall lap, and was awarded the pole position. Colton Herta set the fastest lap in the other qualifying group, and was also awarded a championship point.)	(Sweden) Felix Rosenqvist	(Mexico) Pato O'Ward	(Sweden) Felix Rosenqvist	Chip Ganassi Racing	Honda	Report
5	Iowa 1	(United States) Conor Daly (Note: The qualification format for this race was each car taking a 2 lap run, lap 1 would determine the first race's starting lineup while lap 2 would set the second race's starting lineup with lap 1's fastest lap setter getting 1 championship point for pole for race 1 while lap 2's fastest lap setter getting 1 championship point for pole for race 2. Conor Daly got 1 championship point for pole for race 1 while Josef Newgarden got 1 championship point for pole for race 2.)	(United States) Conor Daly	(France) Simon Pagenaud	(France) Simon Pagenaud	Team Penske	Chevrolet	Report
6	Iowa 2	(United States) Josef Newgarden	(United States) Josef Newgarden	(United States) Josef Newgarden	(United States) Josef Newgarden	Team Penske	Chevrolet	Report
7	Indianapolis 500	(United States) Marco Andretti	(Canada) James Hinchcliffe	(New Zealand) Scott Dixon	(Japan) Takuma Sato	Rahal Letterman Lanigan Racing	Honda	Report
8	Gateway 1	(Australia) Will Power (Note: The qualification format for this race was each car taking a 2 lap run, lap 1 would determine the first race's starting lineup while lap 2 would set the second race's starting lineup with lap 1's fastest lap setter getting 1 championship point for pole for race 1 while lap 2's fastest lap setter getting 1 championship point for pole for race 2. Will Power got 1 championship point for pole for race 1 while Takuma Sato got 1 championship point for pole for race 2.)	(Japan) Takuma Sato	(Mexico) Pato O'Ward	(New Zealand) Scott Dixon	Chip Ganassi Racing	Honda	Report
9	Gateway 2	(Japan) Takuma Sato	(Spain) Álex Palou	(Japan) Takuma Sato	(United States) Josef Newgarden	Team Penske	Chevrolet	Report
10	Mid-Ohio 1	(Australia) Will Power (Note: The qualification format for this race featured two separate qualification groups, with the fastest qualifier in each group earning a championship point; the faster of the two group fastest qualifiers would then start on pole, while the other would start from the outside of the front row. Power set the fastest overall lap, and was awarded the pole position. Ryan Hunter-Reay set the fastest lap in the other qualifying group, and was also awarded a championship point.)	(Mexico) Pato O'Ward	(Australia) Will Power	(Australia) Will Power	Team Penske	Chevrolet	Report
11	Mid-Ohio 2	(United States) Colton Herta (Note: The qualification format for this race featured two separate qualification groups, with the fastest qualifier in each group earning a championship point; the faster of the two group fastest qualifiers would then start on pole, while the other would start from the outside of the front row. Herta set the fastest overall lap, and was awarded the pole position. Santino Ferrucci set the fastest lap in the other qualifying group, and was also awarded a championship point.)	(New Zealand) Scott Dixon	(United States) Colton Herta	(United States) Colton Herta	Andretti Harding Steinbrenner Autosport	Honda	Report
12	Harvest GP 1	(Netherlands) Rinus VeeKay (Note: The qualification format for this race featured two separate qualification groups, with the fastest qualifier in each group earning a championship point; the faster of the two group fastest qualifiers would then start on pole, while the other would start from the outside of the front row. VeeKay set the fastest overall lap, and was awarded the pole position. Josef Newgarden set the fastest lap in the other qualifying group, and was also awarded a championship point.)	(Netherlands) Rinus VeeKay	(United States) Josef Newgarden	(United States) Josef Newgarden	Team Penske	Chevrolet	Report
13	Harvest GP 2	(Australia) Will Power (Note: The qualification format for this race features two separate qualification groups, with the fastest qualifier in each group earning a championship point; the faster of the two group fastest qualifiers would then start on pole, while the other would start from the outside of the front row. Power set the fastest overall lap and was awarded the pole position. Colton Herta set the fastest lap in the other qualifying group, and was also awarded a championship point.)	(France) Simon Pagenaud	(Australia) Will Power	(Australia) Will Power	Team Penske	Chevrolet	Report
14	St. Petersburg	(Australia) Will Power	(Sweden) Marcus Ericsson	(United States) Alexander Rossi	(United States) Josef Newgarden	Team Penske	Chevrolet	Report

== Points standings ==
- Ties are broken by number of wins, followed by number of 2nds, 3rds, etc.; then by finishing position in the previous race; then by random draw.

=== Driver standings ===
- At all races except the Indy 500, the pole position qualifier earned 1 point. The top nine Indy 500 qualifiers received points, descending from 9 points for the pole position. At double header races, the fastest qualifier of each qualifying group earned 1 point.
- Drivers who lead at least one race lap were awarded 1 point. The driver who leads the most laps during a race scored an additional 2 points.
- Entrant-initiated engine change-outs before the engine reaches their required distance run resulted in the loss of 10 points.
- The usual double points for the season finale were suspended for this season.

Pos	Driver	TMS	IGP1	ROA		IOW		INDY	GTW		MOH		IGP2		STP	Pts
1	(New Zealand) Scott Dixon	1^{L}*	1^{L}	1^{L}	12	2	5^{L}	2^{2L}*	1^{L}	5	10	10	9	8	3	537
2	(United States) Josef Newgarden	**3**^{L}	7^{L}	**14**^{L}*	9	5^{L}	**1**^{L}*	5	12	1^{L}	2	8	1^{L}*	4	1^{L}	521
3	(United States) Colton Herta	7	4	5	5	20	19	8^{L}	4	6^{L}	9^{L}	**1**^{L}*	4^{L}	2	11^{L}	421
4	(Mexico) Pato O'Ward	12	8	8	**2**^{L}*	4^{L}	12^{L}	6	3^{L}*	2^{L}	11	9	22	5	2	416
5	(Australia) Will Power	13	**20**^{L}*	2^{L}	11^{L}	21	2^{L}	14^{L}	**17**^{L}	3^{L}	**1**^{L}*	7	6	**1**^{L}*	**24**^{L}	396
6	(United States) Graham Rahal	17	2^{L}	7^{L}	23	12	3^{L}	3^{8}	18	20	4	4^{L}	7^{L}	7	9^{L}	377
7	(Japan) Takuma Sato	DNS	10	9	8	10^{L}	21	1^{3L}	2^{L}	**9**^{L}*	17	18^{L}	18	14	10	348
8	(France) Simon Pagenaud	2	3	12	13	1^{L}*	4	22^{L}	19	16	18	6	16	10	6	339
9	(United States) Alexander Rossi	15	25	19	3	6	8	27^{9L}	22	14	3^{L}	2	2	3	21^{L}*	317
10	(United States) Ryan Hunter-Reay	8	13	4	22	16	22^{L}	10^{5}	7	11	5	3	19	16	5	315
11	(Sweden) Felix Rosenqvist	20	15	18	1^{L}	14^{L}	15	12^{L}	8^{L}	7	6	22	5^{L}	11	18	306
12	(Sweden) Marcus Ericsson	19	6^{L}	10^{L}	4	9	9	32	5	23	15	5^{L}	10	15	7	291
13	(United States) Santino Ferrucci	21	9	6	6	13	18	4^{L}	16^{L}	10	14	14	15^{L}	12	23	290
14	(Netherlands) Rinus VeeKay RY	22	5	13	14	19	17	20^{4}	6	4	8	11	**3**^{L}	17	15	289
15	(United Kingdom) Jack Harvey	16	17^{L}	23	17	7	7	9	11	13	7	12	8	6	19	288
16	(Spain) Álex Palou R	23	19	3	7	11	14	28^{7}	15	12	12	23	17	9	13^{L}	238
17	(United States) Conor Daly	6	12	21	18	**8**^{L}	13^{L}	29	10	8	13	16	12	20	17	237
18	(United States) Charlie Kimball	11	18	11	10	17	16	18	13	18	21	19	13	23	8	218
19	(United States) Oliver Askew R	9	26	15	21	3	6^{L}	30^{L}	14	17	19	15			16	195
20	(United States) Marco Andretti	14	22	22	19	22	10	**13**^{1}	23	15	23	20	25	22	20	176
21	(United States) Zach Veach	4^{L}	14^{L}	16	16	23	20	15^{L}	21	22	20	17				166
22	(United Kingdom) Max Chilton		16	17	15			17			16	13	11	19	12	147
23	(Canada) James Hinchcliffe	18	11					7^{6L}					14	13	14^{L}	138
24	(Brazil) Tony Kanaan	10				18	11	19	9	19						106
25	(United States) Ed Carpenter	5				15	23	26	20	21						81
26	(Canada) Dalton Kellett R		21	20	20			31			22	21	24	25		67
27	(Brazil) Hélio Castroneves							11					20	21		57
28	(France) Sébastien Bourdais												21	18	4	53
29	(United States) Sage Karam		23					24					23	24		32
30	(United States) J. R. Hildebrand							16								28
31	(Spain) Fernando Alonso R							21								18
32	(United States) Spencer Pigot		24^{L}					25								17
33	(United Kingdom) Ben Hanley R							23								14
34	(Australia) James Davison R							33								10
35	(New Zealand) Scott McLaughlin R														22	8
Pos	Driver	TMS	IPG1	ROA		IOW		INDY	GTW		MOH		IGP2		STP	Pts

Color	Result
Gold	Winner
Silver	2nd-place finish
Bronze	3rd-place finish
Green	Top 5 finish
Light Blue	Top 10 finish
Dark Blue	Other flagged position
Purple	Did not finish
Red	Did not qualify (DNQ)
Brown	Withdrew (Wth)
Black	Disqualified (DSQ)
White	Did Not Start (DNS)
White	Race abandoned (C)
Blank	Did not participate

**In-line notation**
**Bold**	Pole position (1 point; except Indy)
Italics	Ran fastest race lap
^{L}	Led race lap (1 point)
*	Led most race laps (2 points)
^{1–9}	Indy 500 "Fast Nine" bonus points
^{c}	Qualifying canceled (no bonus point)
RY	Rookie of the Year
R	Rookie

=== Entrant standings ===
- Based on the entrant, used for oval qualifications order, and starting grids when qualifying is cancelled.
- Only full-time entrants, and at-large part-time entrants shown.

Pos	Driver	TMS	IGP1	ROA		IOW		INDY	GTW		MOH		IGP2		STP	Pts
1	#9 Chip Ganassi Racing	1^{L}*	1^{L}	1^{L}	12	2	5^{L}	2^{2L}*	1^{L}	5	10	10	9	8	3	537
2	#1 Team Penske	**3**^{L}	7^{L}	**14**^{L}*	9	5^{L}	**1**^{L}*	5	12	1^{L}	2	8	1^{L}*	4	1^{L}	521
3	#88 Andretti Harding Steinbrenner Autosport	7	4	5	5	20	19	8^{L}	4	6^{L}	9^{L}	**1**^{L}*	4^{L}	2	11^{L}	421
4	#5 Arrow McLaren SP	12	8	8	**2**^{L}*	4^{L}	12^{L}	6	3^{L}*	2^{L}	11	9	22	5	2	416
5	#12 Team Penske	13	**20**^{L}*	2^{L}	11^{L}	21	2^{L}	14^{L}	**17**^{L}	3^{L}	**1**^{L}*	7	6	**1**^{L}*	**24**^{L}	396
6	#15 Rahal Letterman Lanigan Racing	17	2^{L}	7^{L}	23	12	3^{L}	3^{8}	18	20	4	4^{L}	7^{L}	7	9^{L}	377
7	#30 Rahal Letterman Lanigan Racing	DNS	10	9	8	10^{L}	21	1^{3L}	2^{L}	**9**^{L}*	17	18^{L}	18	14	10	348
8	#22 Team Penske	2	3	12	13	1^{L}*	4	22^{L}	19	16	18	6	16	10	6	339
9	#27 Andretti Autosport	15	25	19	3	6	8	27^{9L}	22	14	3^{L}	2	2	3	21^{L}*	317
10	#28 Andretti Autosport	8	13	4	22	16	22^{L}	10^{5}	7	11	5	3	19	16	5	315
11	#10 Chip Ganassi Racing	20	15	18	1^{L}	14^{L}	15	12^{L}	8^{L}	7	6	22	5^{L}	11	18	306
12	#8 Chip Ganassi Racing	19	6^{L}	10^{L}	4	9	9	32	5	23	15	5^{L}	10	15	7	291
13	#18 Dale Coyne Racing with Vasser Sullivan	21	9	6	6	13	18	4^{L}	16^{L}	10	14	14	15^{L}	12	23	290
14	#21 Ed Carpenter Racing	22	5	13	14	19	17	20^{4}	6	4	8	11	**3**^{L}	17	15	289
15	#60 Meyer Shank Racing	16	17^{L}	23	17	7	7	9	11	13	7	12	8	6	19	288
16	#59 Carlin	6	16	17	15	**8**^{L}	13^{L}	17	10	8	16	13	11	19	12	263
17	#55 Dale Coyne Racing with Team Goh	23	19	3	7	11	14	28^{7}	15	12	12	23	17	9	13^{L}	238
18	#4 A. J. Foyt Enterprises	11	18	11	10	17	16	18	13	18	21	19	13	23	8	218
19	#26 Andretti Autosport	4^{L}	14^{L}	16	16	23	20	15^{L}	21	22	20	17	14	13	14^{L}	216
20	#7 Arrow McLaren SP	9	26	15	21	3	6^{L}	30^{L}	14	17	19	15	20	21	16	214
21	#14 A. J. Foyt Enterprises	10	21	20	20	18	11	19	9	19	22	21	21	18	4	205
22	#20 Ed Carpenter Racing	5	12	21	18	15	23	26	20	21	13	16	12	20	17	192
23	#98 Andretti Herta Autosport w/ Marco Andretti & Curb-Agajanian	14	22	22	19	22	10	**13**^{1}	23	15	23	20	25	22	20	176
Pos	Driver	TMS	IGP1	ROA		IOW		INDY	GTW		MOH		IGP2		STP	Pts

=== Manufacturer standings ===
- All manufacturer points (including qualifying points, race finish points, and race win bonus points) can only be earned by full-season entrants, (Note: Rule 12.6.5.) and provided they are using an engine from their initial allocation, or have mileaged out all previously used engines. (Note: Rule 16.2.3.2.) Ineligible cars are removed from the finishing order used for race finish points, (Note: Rule 16.2.3.3.) and cannot score pole or win bonus points. (Note: Rule 12.6.5.1.5.)
- The top two finishing entrants from each manufacturer in each race score points for their respective manufacturer. The manufacturer that wins each race will be awarded five additional points.
- At all races except the Indy 500, the manufacturer who qualifies on pole earns one point. At the Indy 500, the fastest Saturday qualifier earns one point, while the pole position winner on Sunday earns two points.

Pos	Manufacturer	TMS	IGP1	ROA		IOWA		INDY	GTW		MOH		IGP2		STP	Pts
1	Honda	1	1	1	1	2	3	1	1	5	3	1	2	2	3	1122
1	Honda	4	2	3	3	6	5	2	2	6	4	2	4	3	5	1122
1	Honda	**87**	**95**	**90**	**90**	68	65	**98**^{P}	**95**	59^{P}	67	**96**^{P}	72	75	65	1122
2	Chevrolet	2	3	2	2	1	1	5	3	1	1	6	1	1	1	1099
2	Chevrolet	3	5	8	9	3	2	6	6	2	2	7	3	4	2	1099
2	Chevrolet	76^{P}	66^{P}	65^{P}	63^{P}	**91**^{P}	**96**^{P}	58	64^{P}	**95**	**96**^{P}	54	**91**^{P}	**88**^{P}	**96**^{P}	1099

Manufacturer standings results breakdown
Car	TMS	IGP1	ROA		IOWA		INDY	GTW		MOH		IGP2		STP
Chevrolet
#1 Penske	3^{P}	7	14^{P}	9	5	1^{P}	5	12	1	2	8	1	4	1
#4 Foyt	11	17	11	10	17	16	15	13	18	21	19	13	23	8
#5 AMSP	12	8	8	2^{P}	4	12	6	3	2	11	9	22	5	2
#7 AMSP	9	23	15	21	3	6	22	14	17	19	15	20	21	16
#12 Penske	13	19^{P}	2	11	21	2	12	17^{P}	3	1^{P}	7	6	1	23^{P}
#14 Foyt	10	20	20	20	18	11	16	9	19	22	21	21	18	4
#20 ECR	5	11	21	18	15	23	19	20	21	13	16	12	20	17
#21 ECR	21	5	13	14	20	17	17	6	4	8	11	3^{P}	17	15
#22 Penske	2	3	12	13	1	4	18	19	16	18	6	16	10	6
#59 Carlin	6	15	17	15	8^{P}	13	14	10	8	16	13	11	19	12
Race Finish	75	65	64	62	85	90	58	63	90	90	54	85	82	90
Pole Bonus	1	1	1	1	1	1	–	1	–	1	–	1	1	1
Win Bonus	–	–	–	–	5	5	–	–	5	5	–	5	5	5
Total Points	76	66	65	63	91	96	58	64	95	96	54	91	88	96
Honda
#8 Ganassi	18	6	10	4	9	9	23	5	23	15	5	10	15	7
#9 Ganassi	1	1	1	12	2	5	2	1	5	10	10	9	8	3
#10 Ganassi	19	14	18	1	14	15	10	8	7	6	22	5	11	18
#15 Rahal	17	2	7	23	12	3	3	18	20	4	4	7	7	9
#18 Coyne	20	9	6	6	13	18	4	16	10	14	14	15	12	22
#26 Andretti	4	13	16	16	23	20	13	21	22	20	17	14	13	14
#27 Andretti	15	22	19	3	6	8	20	22	14	3	2	2	3	21
#28 Andretti	8	12	4	22	16	22	9	7	11	5	3	19	16	5
#30 Rahal	DNS	10	9	8	10	21	1	2	9	17	18	18	14	10
#55 Coyne	22	18	3	7	11	14	21	15	12	12	23	17	9	13
#60 Shank	16	16	23	17	7	7	8	11	13	7	12	8	6	19
#88 Andretti	7	4	5	5	19	19	7	4	6	9	1^{P}	4	2	11
#98 Andretti	14	21	22	19	22	10	11^{P}	23	15	23	20	23	22	20
Race Finish	82	90	85	85	68	65	90	90	58	67	90	72	75	65
Pole Bonus	–	–	–	–	–	–	3	–	1	–	1	–	–	–
Win Bonus	5	5	5	5	–	–	5	5	–	–	5	–	–	–
Total Points	87	95	90	90	68	65	98	95	59	67	96	72	75	65

== See also ==
- 2020 Indy Lights (cancelled)
- 2020 Indy Pro 2000 Championship
- 2020 U.S. F2000 National Championship
