= Spencer Pigot =

American racing driver

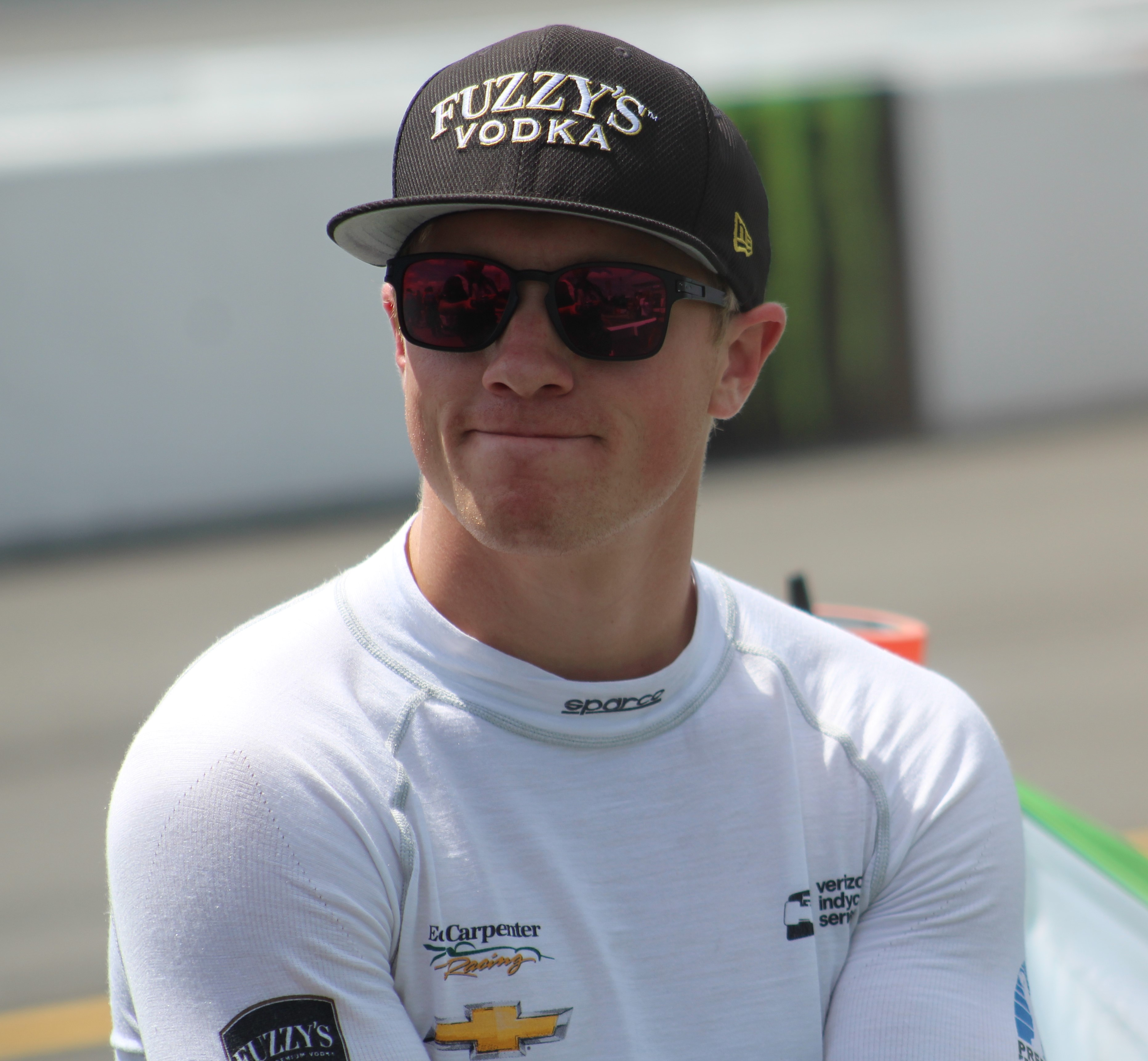
- Pigot at the 2018 ABC Supply 500
- Nationality: (United States) American
- Born: Spencer James Pigot; September 29, 1993 (age 33) Pasadena, California, U.S.
- Categorisation: FIA Gold
- Height: 5 ft 9 in (175 cm)
- Weight: 162 lb (73 kg)
- Achievements: 2014 Pro Mazda Champion; 2015 Indy Lights Champion

IndyCar Series career
- 57 races run over 5 years
- 2019 position: 14th
- Best finish: 14th (2018, 2019)
- First race: 2016 Firestone Grand Prix of St. Petersburg (St. Petersburg)
- Last race: 2020 Indianapolis 500 (Indianapolis)
Wins	Podiums	Poles
0	1	0
- Statistics up to date as of July 4, 2020.

Spencer James Pigot (born September 29, 1993) is an American racing driver who last competed in the 2021 IMSA WeatherTech SportsCar Championship for Riley Motorsports.

== Personal life ==
Pigot was born in Los Angeles and raised Pasadena, California, and Orlando where he graduated from Windermere Preparatory School. He currently resides in Indianapolis.

== Racing career ==
=== Early career ===
After a successful career in youth karting, Pigot joined the Skip Barber National Championship in 2010 and won the title and a Mazdaspeed scholarship. He was also awarded the Team USA Scholarship to compete in the Formula Ford Festival in England.

In 2011, Pigot joined the U.S. F2000 National Championship, part of the Mazda Road to Indy, driving for Andretti Autosport. He finished second in points with three wins. In 2012, he continued in the series, switching teams to Cape Motorsports with Wayne Taylor Racing. He won the 2012 U.S. F2000 Winterfest in the preseason, but again finished second in the main championship, but this time only missed out on the title by seven points to Matthew Brabham. Pigot captured eight race wins compared to Brabham's four. In 2013, Pigot moved up the Road to Indy ladder into the Pro Mazda Championship with Team Pelfrey. He finished tied for third in points with Shelby Blackstock, but Blackstock won the tie-breaker for third by virtue of having three third place finishes to Pigot's one. Both drivers had one win and three-second place finishes.

In 2014, Pigot switched teams in Pro Mazda to Juncos Racing. He won the first four races of the season and captured the title in a controversial fight with Scott Hargrove. His championship earned him a scholarship to compete in Indy Lights in 2015.

2015 saw Pigot clinch the Indy Lights championship by sweeping the final two races at Mazda Raceway Laguna Seca. He won a scholarship to compete in the 100th running of the Indianapolis 500 in the IndyCar Series and in November signed with Rahal Letterman Lanigan Racing.

=== IndyCar Series ===
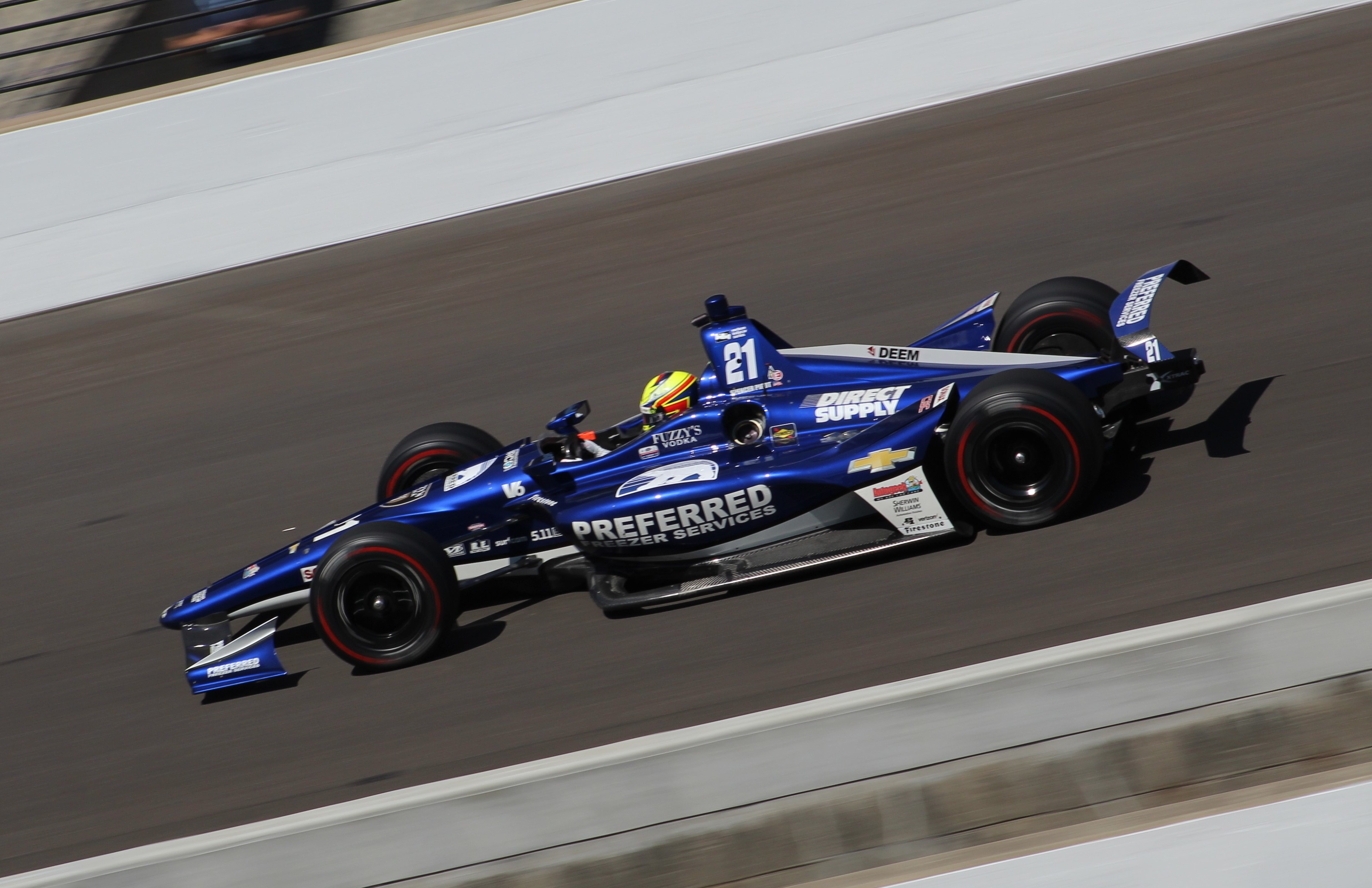
Pigot driving for Ed Carpenter Racing at the 2018 Indianapolis 500

Pigot competed at the season opener at the Honda Grand Prix of St. Petersburg and finished 14th. His next race was the Grand Prix of Indianapolis where he finished eleventh. In the 2016 Indianapolis 500, he qualified on the tenth row in 29th and finished the race in 25th, five laps down, the last car running, after running out of fuel mid-race during a caution flag. The following week, it was announced that Pigot would drive in seven more road and street course races throughout the season for Ed Carpenter Racing in the No. 20 car driven by Ed Carpenter on ovals.

In January 2017, it was announced that Pigot would return for a second season as road and street course driver in the Ed Carpenter Racing No. 20 entry. It was confirmed on May 9, 2017, that Pigot would rejoin Juncos Racing for the 2017 Indianapolis 500.

Ed Carpenter Racing announced on September 13, 2017, that Pigot would compete full-time in IndyCar Series for the first time in 2018.

In 2020, Pigot competed on a part-time basis. His second race of the season was the 2020 Indianapolis 500, where he spun with five laps to go out of turn 4. His car ended up making significant contact with the wall at the entrance to pit road. Pigot was transferred to Indiana University Health Methodist Hospital, but recovered and was released by the end of the day.

=== Sports cars ===
In addition to IndyCar, 2016 saw Pigot make his WeatherTech SportsCar Championship debut. Pigot drove four races in the No. 55 Mazda prototype entry including the Rolex 24. He has retained the role for the 2017 season. Pigot earned his first career IMSA podium with a third place finish at the 2017 Six Hours of the Glen Pigot was announced in November 2017 as a driver with the newly formed Mazda Team Joest for 2018 endurance races as part of the WeatherTech Sports Car Championship. In 2020, Pigot was a sub for Simon Trummer in a WTSCC race, driving Trummer's LMP2 entry in the Grand Prix of Sebring. In 2021, Pigot joined Riley Motorsports for two races and drove for Jr III Motorsports in one.

== American open-wheel racing results ==
(key)

=== U.S. F2000 National Championship ===
Year	Team	1	2	3	4	5	6	7	8	9	10	11	12	13	14	Rank	Points
2011	Andretti Autosport	SEB; 3	SEB; 2	STP; 1	STP; 2	ORP; 4	MIL; 6	MOH; 3	MOH; 4	ROA; 1	ROA; 2	BAL; 11	BAL; 1			2nd	281
2012	Cape Motorsports Wayne Taylor Racing	SEB; 3	SEB; 1	STP; 1	STP; 1	LOR; 1	MOH; 1	MOH; 23	ROA; 16	ROA; 3	ROA; 2	BAL; 1	BAL; 24	VIR; 1	VIR; 1	2nd	332

=== Pro Mazda Championship ===
Year	Team	1	2	3	4	5	6	7	8	9	10	11	12	13	14	15	16	Rank	Points
2013	Team Pelfrey	AUS; 2	AUS; 16	STP; 4	STP; 4	IND; 2	IOW; 3	TOR; 9	TOR; 11	MOS; 1	MOS; 4	MOH; 4	MOH; 5	TRO; 5	TRO; 5	HOU; 2	HOU; 5	4th	297
2014	Juncos Racing	STP; 1	STP; 1	BAR; 1	BAR; 1	IMS; 8	IMS; 8	LOR; 3	HOU; 9	HOU; 1	MOH; 4	MOH; 6	MIL; 1	SON; 21	SON; 5			1st	309

=== Indy Lights ===
Year	Team	1	2	3	4	5	6	7	8	9	10	11	12	13	14	15	16	Rank	Points
2015	Juncos Racing	STP; 3	STP; 3	LBH; 2	ALA; 1	ALA; 1	IMS; 7	IMS; 12	INDY; 9	TOR; 1	TOR; 1	MIL; 7	IOW; 8	MOH; 8	MOH; 3	LAG; 1	LAG; 1	1st	357

=== IndyCar Series ===
Year	Team	No.	Chassis	Engine	1	2	3	4	5	6	7	8	9	10	11	12	13	14	15	16	17	Rank	Points	Ref
2016	Rahal Letterman Lanigan Racing	16	Dallara DW12	Honda	STP; 14	PHX	LBH	ALA	IMS; 11	INDY; 25												21st	165	
2016	Ed Carpenter Racing	20	Dallara DW12	Chevrolet							DET; 17	DET; 18	RDA; 9	IOW	TOR; 19	MOH; 7	POC	TXS	WGL; 15	SNM; 22		21st	165	
2017	Ed Carpenter Racing	20	Dallara DW12	Chevrolet	STP; 20	LBH; 8	ALA; 20	PHX	IMS; 9		DET; 10	DET; 21	TXS	ROA; 12	IOW	TOR; 18	MOH; 19	POC	GTW	WGL; 12	SNM; 13	20th	218	
2017	Juncos Racing	11	Dallara DW12	Chevrolet						INDY; 18												20th	218	
2018	Ed Carpenter Racing	21	Dallara DW12	Chevrolet	STP; 15	PHX; 14	LBH; 15	ALA; 15	IMS; 15	INDY; 20	DET; 10	DET; 23	TXS; 11	ROA; 8	IOW; 2	TOR; 20	MOH; 13	POC; 16	GTW; 6	POR; 4	SNM; 24	14th	325	
2019	Ed Carpenter Racing	21	Dallara DW12	Chevrolet	STP; 11	COA; 11	ALA; 17	LBH; 18	IMS; 5	INDY; 14	DET; 10	DET; 21	TXS; 14	RDA; 14	TOR; 15	IOW; 5	MOH; 7	POC; 17	GTW; 21	POR; 6	LAG; 20	14th	335	
2020	Rahal Letterman Lanigan Racing with Citrone/Buhl Autosport	45	Dallara DW12	Honda	TXS	IMS; 24	ROA	ROA	IOW	IOW	INDY; 25	GTW	GTW	MOH	MOH	IMS	IMS	STP				32nd	17	

* Season still in progress.

==== Indianapolis 500 ====
Year	Chassis	Engine	Start	Finish	Team
2016	Dallara	Honda	29	25	Rahal Letterman Lanigan Racing
2017	Dallara	Chevrolet	29	18	Juncos Racing
2018	Dallara	Chevrolet	6	20	Ed Carpenter Racing
2019	Dallara	Chevrolet	3	14	Ed Carpenter Racing
2020	Dallara	Honda	12	25	Rahal Letterman Lanigan Racing

== Sports car racing results ==
=== Complete WeatherTech SportsCar Championship results ===
(key)(Races in bold indicate pole position)

Year	Entrant	Class	Make	Engine	1	2	3	4	5	6	7	8	9	10	Rank	Points
2016	Mazda Motorsports	P	Mazda Prototype	Mazda MZ-2.0T 2.0 L Turbo I4	DAY; 10	SEB; 6	LBH	LGA	DET	WGL; 8	MOS	ELK	COA	PET; 9	16th	95
2017	Mazda Motorsports	P	Mazda RT24-P	Mazda MZ-2.0T 2.0 L Turbo I4	DAY; 11	SEB; 5	LBH	COA	DET	WGL; 3	MOS	ELK	LGA	PET	20th	76
2018	Mazda Team Joest	P	Mazda RT24-P	Mazda MZ-2.0T 2.0 L Turbo I4	DAY; 16	SEB; 6	LBH	MOH; 14	DET	WGL; 10	MOS	ELK	LGA	PET; 3	22nd	108
2019	Juncos Racing	DPi	Cadillac DPi-V.R	Cadillac 5.5 L V8	DAY	SEB	LBH	MOH	DET	WGL	MOS	ELK	LGA	PET; 10	34th	21
2020	PR1 Mathiasen Motorsports	LMP2	Oreca 07	Gibson GK428 4.2 L V8	DAY	**SEB**; 1	ELK	ATL	PET	LGA	SEB				12th	35
2021	Riley Motorsports	LMP3	Ligier JS P320	Nissan VK56DE 5.6 L V8	DAY; 1†	SEB; 3	MOH	WGL	WGL	ELK	PET; 2				14th	673

^{†} Points only counted towards the Michelin Endurance Cup, and not the overall LMP3 Championship.

Sporting positions
Preceded by Zach Veach	U.S. F2000 Winterfest; Champion; 2012	Succeeded by Neil Alberico
Preceded by Inaugural	Pro Mazda Winterfest; Champion; 2014	Succeeded by Jack Aitken
Preceded by Matthew Brabham	Pro Mazda Championship; Champion; 2014	Succeeded by Santiago Urrutia
Preceded by Gabby Chaves	Indy Lights; Champion; 2015	Succeeded by Ed Jones
