= Oliver Askew =

American racing driver (born 1996)

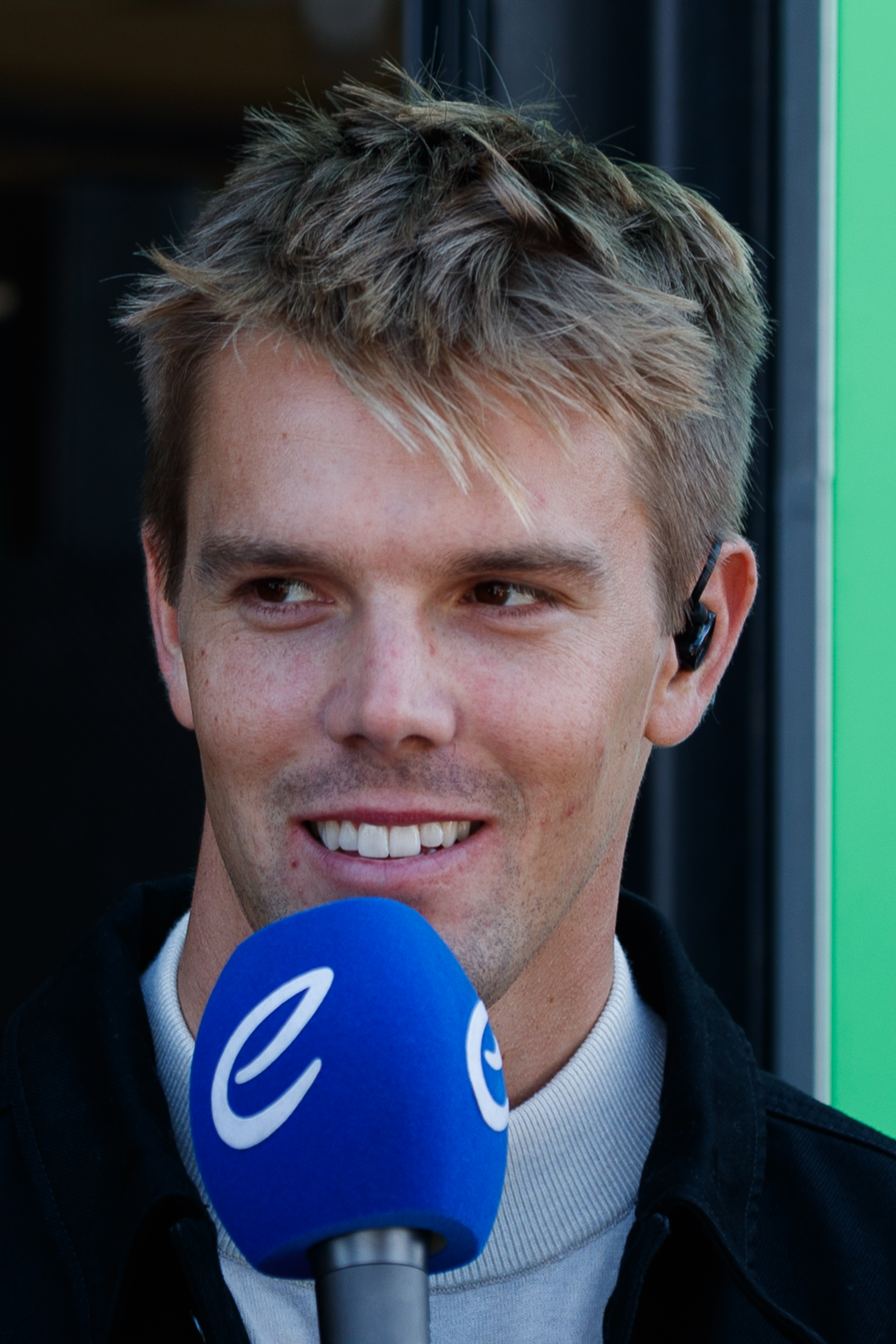
- Askew in 2023
- Nationality: (United States) American
- Born: Oliver Clark Askew; December 12, 1996 (age 29) Melbourne, Florida, United States
- Categorisation: FIA Silver (until 2021); FIA Gold (2022–)

IndyCar Series career
- 17 races run over 2 years
- Best finish: 19th (2020)
- First race: 2020 Genesys 300 (Texas)
- Last race: 2021 Grand Prix of Long Beach (Long Beach)
Wins	Podiums	Poles
0	1	0

Previous series
- 2022; 2019; 2018; 2017; 2015: Formula E; Indy Lights; Pro Mazda Championship; U.S. F2000 National Championship; Formula Masters China

Championship titles
- 2017; 2019: U.S. F2000; Indy Lights

Oliver Clark Askew (born December 12, 1996) is an American racing driver who serves as a reserve driver for Andretti Global in Formula E. Askew last competed in the 2021-22 Formula E World Championship for Andretti Autosport in Season 8. He is the 2019 Indy Lights champion.

== Racing career ==
=== Early career ===
Askew began karting at the age of eight in Jupiter. He finished third and sixth in the Rotax Max Challenge Grand Finals, and won the BNL Senior Max series in his European debut in 2015. At the end of the year, he signed with Absolute Racing to make his open-wheel debut in the last two rounds of the Formula Masters China, with two podium finishes in six races, but he failed to secure a racing program for 2016 due to a lack of funding.

In 2016, after being spotted during a winning performance in a one-off Skip Barber Racing Summer Series round at Road America, Askew was selected as a Team USA Scholarship recipient. This enabled him to compete in the Formula Ford Festival and the Walter Hayes Trophy, in which Askew won his heat and finished second in the final. Later in 2016, he won the $200,000 2016 Mazda Road to Indy Shootout at Mazda Raceway Laguna Seca to compete in the 2017 USF2000 championship.

=== USF2000 ===
Askew won the 2017 USF2000 championship. The win earned him a $400,000 scholarship from Mazda to race in the 2018 Pro Mazda series, the middle step on the Mazda Road to Indy ladder system to IndyCar racing. In May 2017, Askew joined the Rising Star Racing program which attempts to aid young American open-wheel drivers advance in their careers.

=== Pro Mazda ===
In February 2018, Askew signed with Cape Motorsports to drive in the 2018 Pro Mazda series. Askew scored his first Pro Mazda victory in Race 1 at Portland. He finished the 2018 season third in the Pro Mazda championship.

=== Indy Lights ===
In September 2018, Askew partook in the Chris Griffis Memorial Test with Andretti Autosport. In February 2019, Andretti confirmed Askew would race with them in the forthcoming championship. Askew won the 2019 Indy Lights championship, clinching at WeatherTech Raceway Laguna Seca. In winning the championship, Askew has been awarded a scholarship which guarantees him an entry into a minimum of three races in the 2020 IndyCar Series, including the Indianapolis 500.

== IndyCar ==
In July 2019, Askew joined the Portland test with Chip Ganassi Racing. On October 28, 2019, Arrow McLaren SP announced that Askew, alongside Patricio O'Ward, would race full-time for the team in 2020. A hard crash at the 2020 Indianapolis 500 left Askew with concussion-like symptoms; after racing the next four events, Askew sought treatment and was withdrawn from the harvest Grand Prix rounds. He was later cleared to return for the season finale. On October 12, AMSP dropped Askew in advance of 2021 without giving a reason why.

Askew returned to IndyCar with AMSP for the second race of the Detroit Grand Prix, standing in for the injured Felix Rosenqvist after the latter crashed heavily during the first race. He raced with Ed Carpenter Racing at the following race at Road America in place of the injured Rinus VeeKay.

In July 2021, Askew tested with Rahal Letterman Lanigan Racing at Barber Motorsports Park alongside Danish Formula 2 driver Christian Lundgaard. He later signed to drive the third Rahal entry for the final three races of the season. Askew's three race run with the team was mixed. He recorded a top-ten finish and a RLL's only Fast Six qualifying slot on a road or street course at Laguna Seca but was caught up in accidents at Portland and Long Beach. He also caused significant damage to the No. 45 car in a crash in qualifying at Long Beach. Ultimately RLL chose Lundgaard to drive the third RLL car full time in 2022, ending Askew's chances with the team.

In September 2023, Askew rejoined Ed Carpenter Racing for a test at Barber, with a view to a possible race seat in 2024. His teammate for the day was rookie Christian Rasmussen—the Dane ultimately getting the nod.

== Sports car career ==
In January 2021, Askew made his sports car racing debut at the 24 Hours of Daytona driving for Riley Motorsports in the LMP3 class. Askew would go on to win the race in that class.

== Formula E ==
=== Avalanche Andretti Formula E (2022) ===
In November 2021, it was announced that Askew would reunite with Andretti to partake in his rookie season of Formula E the following year, partnering Jake Dennis. He managed to score his first points in Formula E on his debut, after finishing ninth at the Diriyah ePrix.

Askew departed Andretti after just one season despite being rookie of the year, with his seat being taken by André Lotterer. Askew left the series following the season after being unable to secure a seat.

=== Andretti Global Formula E (2025) ===
Ahead of the team’s home race at the 2025 Miami ePrix, Andretti Global (formerly Andretti Formula E) announced that Askew would rejoin the team as an additional reserve driver for the remainder of Season 11.

== After Formula E ==
During the 2023 season, Askew would become a commentator for the Formula E broadcasting team, accompanying former Formula E Champion Nelson Piquet Jr and Naomi Schiff, starting with the Mexico City ePrix. It would ultimately be his only season as a Formula E commentator. He would return to his former Andretti team as reserve/simulation driver for both Season 11 and Season 12.

== Personal life ==
Askew was born in Melbourne, Florida and raised in Jupiter. With his mother hailing from Sweden, Askew is bilingual in Swedish. Throughout his career, Askew frequently raced alongside friend and fellow Jupiter native Kyle Kirkwood.

== Racing record ==
=== Career summary ===
Season	Series	Team	Races	Wins	Poles	F/Laps	Podiums	Points	Position
2015	Formula Masters China	Absolute Racing	6	0	0	0	2	34	10th
2017	U.S. F2000 National Championship	Cape Motorsports	14	7	7	8	11	351	**1st**
2017	F2000 Championship Series	N/A	2	0	0	2	0	46	25th
2018	Pro Mazda Championship	Cape Motorsports	16	1	3	2	5	303	**3rd**
2019	Indy Lights	Andretti Autosport	18	7	7	5	15	486	**1st**
2020	IndyCar Series	Arrow McLaren SP	12	0	0	0	1	195	19th
2021	IMSA SportsCar Championship - LMP3	Riley Motorsports	1	1	0	0	1	1744	6th
2021	IMSA SportsCar Championship - LMP3	Forty7 Motorsports	1	0	0	0	0	1744	6th
2021	IMSA SportsCar Championship - LMP3	Andretti Autosport	5	0	0	1	0	1744	6th
2021	IndyCar Series	Arrow McLaren SP	1	0	0	0	0	61	29th
2021	IndyCar Series	Ed Carpenter Racing	1	0	0	0	0	61	29th
2021	IndyCar Series	Rahal Letterman Lanigan Racing	3	0	0	0	0	61	29th
2021–22	Formula E	Avalanche Andretti Formula E	16	0	0	0	0	24	16th
2024–25	Formula E	Andretti Formula E	Reserve driver						
2025–26	Formula E	Andretti Formula E	Reserve driver						

^{*} Season still in progress.

=== American open–wheel racing results ===
==== U.S. F2000 National Championship ====
Year	Team	1	2	3	4	5	6	7	8	9	10	11	12	13	14	Rank	Points
2017	Cape Motorsports	STP; 2	STP; 1	**BAR**; 1	**BAR**; 1	**IMS**; 1	**IMS**; 1	ROA; 17	ROA; 3	**IOW**; 1	TOR; 2	**TOR**; 12	**MOH**; 1	MOH; 4	**WGL**; 2	1st	351

==== Pro Mazda Championship ====
Year	Team	1	2	3	4	5	6	7	8	9	10	11	12	13	14	15	16	Rank	Points
2018	Cape Motorsports	**STP**; 5	STP; 6	BAR; 7	BAR; 12	**IMS**; 2	**IMS**; 4	LOR; 6	ROA; 9	ROA; 8	TOR; 4	TOR; 2	MOH; 6	MOH; 3	GMP; 5	POR; 1	POR; 3	3rd	303

==== Indy Lights ====
Year	Team	1	2	3	4	5	6	7	8	9	10	11	12	13	14	15	16	17	18	Rank	Points
2019	Andretti Autosport	STP; 3	**STP**; 10	**COA**; 1	**COA**; 1	IMS; 2	IMS; 3	INDY; 1	RDA; 5	RDA; 3	TOR; 2	**TOR**; 1	**MOH**; 1	**MOH**; 1	**GTW**; 1	POR; 2	POR; 3	LAG; 4	LAG; 2	1st	486

==== IndyCar Series ====
(key)

Year	Team	No.	Chassis	Engine	1	2	3	4	5	6	7	8	9	10	11	12	13	14	15	16	Rank	Points	Ref
2020	Arrow McLaren SP	7	Dallara DW12	Chevrolet	TXS; 9	IMS; 26	ROA; 15	ROA; 21	IOW; 3	IOW; 6	INDY; 30	GTW; 14	GTW; 17	MOH; 19	MOH; 15	IMS	IMS	STP; 16			19th	195	
2021	Arrow McLaren SP	7	Dallara DW12	Chevrolet	ALA	STP	TXS	TXS	IMS	INDY	DET	DET; 25									29th	61	
2021	Ed Carpenter Racing	21	Dallara DW12	Chevrolet									ROA; 12	MOH	NSH	IMS	GTW				29th	61	
2021	Rahal Letterman Lanigan Racing	45	Dallara DW12	Honda														POR; 24	LAG; 9	LBH; 22	29th	61	

* Season still in progress.

==== Indianapolis 500 ====
Year	Chassis	Engine	Start	Finish	Team
2020	Dallara	Chevrolet	21	30	Arrow McLaren SP

=== Complete IMSA SportsCar Championship results ===
(key) (Races in bold indicate pole position; races in italics indicate fastest lap)

Year	Entrant	Class	Make	Engine	1	2	3	4	5	6	7	Rank	Points
2021	Riley Motorsports	LMP3	Ligier JS P320	Nissan VK56DE 5.6 L V8	DAY; 1†							6th	1744
2021	Andretti Autosport	LMP3	Ligier JS P320	Nissan VK56DE 5.6 L V8			MOH; 6	WGL; 4	WGL; 4	ELK; 5	PET; 10	6th	1744
2021	Forty7 Motorsport	LMP3	Duqueine M30 - D08	Nissan VK56DE 5.6 L V8		SEB; 4						6th	1744

^{†} Points only counted towards the Michelin Endurance Cup, and not the overall LMP3 Championship. ^{*} Season still in progress.

=== Complete Formula E results ===
(key) (Races in bold indicate pole position; races in italics indicate fastest lap)

Year	Team	Chassis	Powertrain	1	2	3	4	5	6	7	8	9	10	11	12	13	14	15	16	Pos	Points
2021–22	Avalanche Andretti Formula E	Spark SRT05e	BMW iFE.21	DRH; 9	DRH; 11	MEX; 17	RME; 14	RME; 15	MCO; 15	BER; 15	BER; 15	JAK; 13	MRK; 11	NYC; 19	NYC; Ret	LDN; 4	LDN; Ret	SEO; Ret	SEO; 5	16th	24

Sporting positions
Preceded by Anthony Martin	U.S. F2000 National Championship; Champion; 2017	Succeeded by Kyle Kirkwood
Preceded by Patricio O'Ward	Indy Lights; Champion; 2019	Succeeded by Kyle Kirkwood; 2021
