= 2020 IndyCar Grand Prix =

(United States) 2020 GMR Grand Prix
Race details
2nd round of the 2020 IndyCar Series season
| ← Previous race | Next race → |
- Date: July 4, 2020
- Official name: GMR Grand Prix
- Location: Indianapolis Motor Speedway
- Course: Permanent racing facility 2.439 mi / 3.925 km
- Distance: 80 laps 195.12 mi / 314.02 km

Pole position
- Driver: (Australia) Will Power (Team Penske)
- Time: 1:10.1779

Fastest lap
- Driver: (New Zealand) Scott Dixon (Chip Ganassi Racing)
- Time: 1:11.751 (on lap 49 of 80)

Podium
- First: (New Zealand) Scott Dixon (Chip Ganassi Racing)
- Second: (United States) Graham Rahal (Rahal Letterman Lanigan Racing)
- Third: (France) Simon Pagenaud (Team Penske)

Chronology
| Previous | Next |
|---|---|
| 2019 | October 2020 |

The 2020 GMR Grand Prix, was an IndyCar Series event scheduled for July 4, 2020 and was the second of fourteen rounds of the 2020 IndyCar Series Season. It was originally scheduled for May 9, but was postponed due to the COVID-19 pandemic. As a result of the postponement, the race was run as a double-header event with the NASCAR Xfinity Series, with IndyCar sharing the card with the Shell 150 NASCAR Xfinity Series event, the day before the NASCAR Cup Series Big Machine Hand Sanitizer 400. The race was also reduced from 85 laps to 80 laps to compensate for the compacted schedule, and was the first of two meetings held on the Indianapolis Motor Speedway Road Course. The second road course meeting was held October 2–4 as part of the Harvest Auto Racing Classic featuring the Intercontinental GT Challenge. It was the inaugural NASCAR meeting race for INDYCAR.

== Qualifying ==
Qualifying was held Friday, July 3, with the first session beginning at 4:30 p.m. EST. With temperatures much higher than the normal May date the event had normally been run at, qualifying times were slower than in years previous. Will Power qualified on pole position with a time of 1:10.1779, besting Jack Harvey and Colton Herta. Rookie Oliver Askew set the fastest time of the day in the second round of qualifying with a 1:09.8780, but wore out his tires in doing so, causing him to only manage 5th place in the Firestone Fast 6 session.

| Key | Meaning |
|---|---|
| R | Rookie |
| W | Past winner |

| Pos | No. | Name | Grp. | Round 1 | Round 2 | Fast 6 |
|---|---|---|---|---|---|---|
| 1 | 12 | (Australia) Will Power W | 2 | 1:10.2548 | 1:10.1313 | 1:10.1779 |
| 2 | 60 | (United Kingdom) Jack Harvey | 2 | 1:10.5157 | 1:10.0238 | 1:10.3653 |
| 3 | 88 | (United States) Colton Herta | 2 | 1:10.4114 | 1:10.0985 | 1:10.5197 |
| 4 | 15 | (United States) Graham Rahal | 2 | 1:10.5647 | 1:10.0707 | 1:10.5844 |
| 5 | 7 | (United States) Oliver Askew R | 1 | 1:10.5306 | 1:09.8780 | 1:10.8404 |
| 6 | 1 | (United States) Josef Newgarden | 1 | 1:10.6188 | 1:10.1420 | No Time |
| 7 | 9 | (New Zealand) Scott Dixon | 2 | 1:10.5000 | 1:10.1990 | |
| 8 | 20 | (United States) Conor Daly | 1 | 1:10.5658 | 1:10.2169 | |
| 9 | 10 | (Sweden) Felix Rosenqvist | 1 | 1:10.5558 | 1:10.2310 | |
| 10 | 59 | (United Kingdom) Max Chilton | 1 | 1:10.5465 | 1:10.3055 | |
| 11 | 27 | (United States) Alexander Rossi | 2 | 1:10.5947 | 1:10.3426 | |
| 12 | 28 | (United States) Ryan Hunter-Reay | 1 | 1:10.5880 | 1:10.5764 | |
| 13 | 5 | (Mexico) Patricio O'Ward | 1 | 1:10.7333 | | |
| 14 | 8 | (Sweden) Marcus Ericsson | 2 | 1:10.6287 | | |
| 15 | 18 | (United States) Santino Ferrucci | 1 | 1:10.7902 | | |
| 16 | 45 | (United States) Spencer Pigot | 2 | 1:10.6350 | | |
| 17 | 30 | (Japan) Takuma Sato | 1 | 1:10.8853 | | |
| 18 | 21 | (Netherlands) Rinus VeeKay R | 2 | 1:10.7070 | | |
| 19 | 29 | (Canada) James Hinchcliffe | 1 | 1:11.1478 | | |
| 20 | 22 | (France) Simon Pagenaud W | 2 | 1:10.7438 | | |
| 21 | 55 | (Spain) Álex Palou R | 1 | 1:11.1815 | | |
| 22 | 26 | (United States) Zach Veach | 2 | 1:11.2762 | | |
| 23 | 24 | (United States) Sage Karam | 1 | 1:11.7774 | | |
| 24 | 4 | (United States) Charlie Kimball | 2 | 1:11.4026 | | |
| 25 | 98 | (United States) Marco Andretti | 1 | 1:12.0513 | | |
| 26 | 14 | (Canada) Dalton Kellett R | 2 | 1:11.5876 | | |

== Race ==
| Pos | No. | Driver | Team | Engine | Laps | Time/Status | Pit Stops | Grid | Laps Led | Pts.^{1} |
|---|---|---|---|---|---|---|---|---|---|---|
| 1 | 9 | (New Zealand) Scott Dixon | Chip Ganassi Racing | Honda | 80 | 1:41:59.3232 | 3 | 7 | 26 | 51 |
| 2 | 15 | (United States) Graham Rahal | Rahal Letterman Lanigan Racing | Honda | 80 | +19.946 | 2 | 4 | 18 | 41 |
| 3 | 22 | (France) Simon Pagenaud W | Team Penske | Chevrolet | 80 | +20.564 | 3 | 20 | | 35 |
| 4 | 88 | (United States) Colton Herta | Andretti Harding Steinbrenner Racing | Honda | 80 | +25.088 | 3 | 3 | | 32 |
| 5 | 21 | (Netherlands) Rinus VeeKay R | Ed Carpenter Racing | Chevrolet | 80 | +25.636 | 3 | 18 | | 30 |
| 6 | 8 | (Sweden) Marcus Ericsson | Chip Ganassi Racing | Honda | 80 | +25.713 | 3 | 14 | 1 | 29 |
| 7 | 1 | (United States) Josef Newgarden | Team Penske | Chevrolet | 80 | +31.897 | 3 | 6 | 4 | 27 |
| 8 | 5 | (Mexico) Patricio O'Ward | Arrow McLaren SP | Chevrolet | 80 | +33.836 | 3 | 13 | | 24 |
| 9 | 18 | (United States) Santino Ferrucci | Dale Coyne Racing w/Vasser-Sullivan | Honda | 80 | +43.046 | 2 | 15 | | 22 |
| 10 | 30 | (Japan) Takuma Sato | Rahal Letterman Lanigan Racing | Honda | 80 | +44.891 | 4 | 17 | | 20 |
| 11 | 29 | (Canada) James Hinchcliffe | Andretti Autosport | Honda | 80 | +46.167 | 3 | 19 | | 19 |
| 12 | 20 | (United States) Conor Daly | Ed Carpenter Racing | Chevrolet | 80 | +49.977 | 2 | 8 | | 18 |
| 13 | 28 | (United States) Ryan Hunter-Reay | Andretti Autosport | Honda | 80 | +50.489 | 3 | 12 | | 17 |
| 14 | 26 | (United States) Zach Veach | Andretti Autosport | Honda | 80 | +52.217 | 4 | 22 | 1 | 17 |
| 15 | 10 | (Sweden) Felix Rosenqvist | Chip Ganassi Racing | Honda | 80 | +56.688 | 3 | 9 | | 15 |
| 16 | 59 | (United Kingdom) Max Chilton | Carlin | Chevrolet | 80 | +1:00.231 | 3 | 10 | | 14 |
| 17 | 60 | (United Kingdom) Jack Harvey | Meyer Shank Racing | Honda | 80 | +1:03.845 | 3 | 2 | 1 | 14 |
| 18 | 4 | (United States) Charlie Kimball | A. J. Foyt Enterprises | Chevrolet | 80 | +1:05.519 | 3 | 24 | | 12 |
| 19 | 55 | (Spain) Álex Palou R | Dale Coyne Racing w/Team Goh | Honda | 80 | +1:06.478 | 3 | 21 | | 11 |
| 20 | 12 | (Australia) Will Power W | Team Penske | Chevrolet | 80 | +1:11.612 | 3 | 1 | 28 | 14 |
| 21 | 14 | (Canada) Dalton Kellett R | A. J. Foyt Enterprises | Chevrolet | 79 | +1 Lap | 3 | 26 | | 9 |
| 22 | 98 | (United States) Marco Andretti | Andretti Herta Autosport w/ Marco Andretti & Curb-Agajanian | Honda | 79 | +1 Lap | 3 | 25 | | 8 |
| 23 | 24 | (United States) Sage Karam | Dreyer & Reinbold Racing | Chevrolet | 79 | +1 Lap | 3 | 23 | | 7 |
| 24 | 45 | (United States) Spencer Pigot | Rahal Letterman Lanigan Racing w/Citrone/Buhl Autosport | Honda | 74 | Mechanical | 2 | 16 | 1 | 7 |
| 25 | 27 | (United States) Alexander Rossi | Andretti Autosport | Honda | 41 | Mechanical | 2 | 11 | | 5 |
| 26 | 7 | (United States) Oliver Askew R | Arrow McLaren SP | Chevrolet | 34 | Contact | 1 | 5 | | 5 |

=== Race statistics ===
Average speed: 114.789 mph (184.735 km/h)

Lead changes: 10

Lap leader breakdown
| From lap | To lap | Total laps | Driver |
|---|---|---|---|
| 1 | 16 | 16 | Will Power |
| 17 | 17 | 1 | Jack Harvey |
| 18 | 26 | 9 | Graham Rahal |
| 27 | 38 | 12 | Will Power |
| 39 | 47 | 9 | Graham Rahal |
| 48 | 54 | 7 | Scott Dixon |
| 55 | 55 | 1 | Spencer Pigot |
| 56 | 56 | 1 | Marcus Ericsson |
| 57 | 60 | 4 | Josef Newgarden |
| 61 | 61 | 1 | Zach Veach |
| 62 | 80 | 19 | Scott Dixon |

Cautions: 1 for 4 laps
| From lap | To lap | Total laps | Reason |
|---|---|---|---|
| 36 | 39 | 4 | #7 (Askew) accident turn 14 |

== Championship standings after the race ==
Drivers' Championship standings

| | Pos | Driver | Points |
|---|---|---|---|
| | 1 | (New Zealand) Scott Dixon | 104 |
| | 2 | (France) Simon Pagenaud | 75 |
| | 3 | (United States) Josef Newgarden | 64 |
| 3 | 4 | (United States) Colton Herta | 58 |
| 12 | 5 | (United States) Graham Rahal | 54 |

| Previous race: 2020 Genesys 300 | IndyCar Series; 2020 season | Next race: 2020 Rev Group GP's; 1 & 2 |
| Previous race: New | INDYCAR Grand Prix (NASCAR) | Next race: 2021 Big Machine Spiked Coolers Grand Prix |
