= TGM Grand Prix =

Racing team

(Japan) TGM Grand Prix
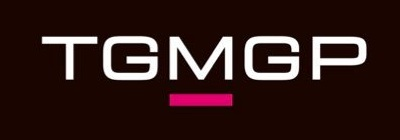
- Founded: 1996
- Founder(s): Kazumichi Goh
- Team principal(s): Kazuhiro Ikeda
- Current series: Super Formula; F4 Japanese Championship; Kyojo Cup
- Former series: JGTC; Super GT; FIA GT; FIA Sportscar; Le Mans Series; IndyCar Series
- Current drivers: Kazuto Kotaka; Hibiki Taira
- Teams' Championships: 1 (1996 JGTC)
- Drivers' Championships: 1 (1996 JGTC)

TGM Grand Prix or TGMGP, formerly Team Goh Motorsports, is a Japanese auto racing team founded by Kazumichi Goh in 1996. The team has competed in the Super Formula Championship since 2023.

== History ==
Initially competing in the All-Japan Grand Touring Car Championship (JGTC), Team Goh won the 1996 championship with a McLaren F1 GTR and drivers John Nielsen and David Brabham.

=== 24 Hours of Le Mans ===
The team next set its sights on the 24 Hours of Le Mans, initially entering the McLaren in 1997, then a former works BMW V12 LM in 1999, and a pair of Panoz LMP-1s in 2000.

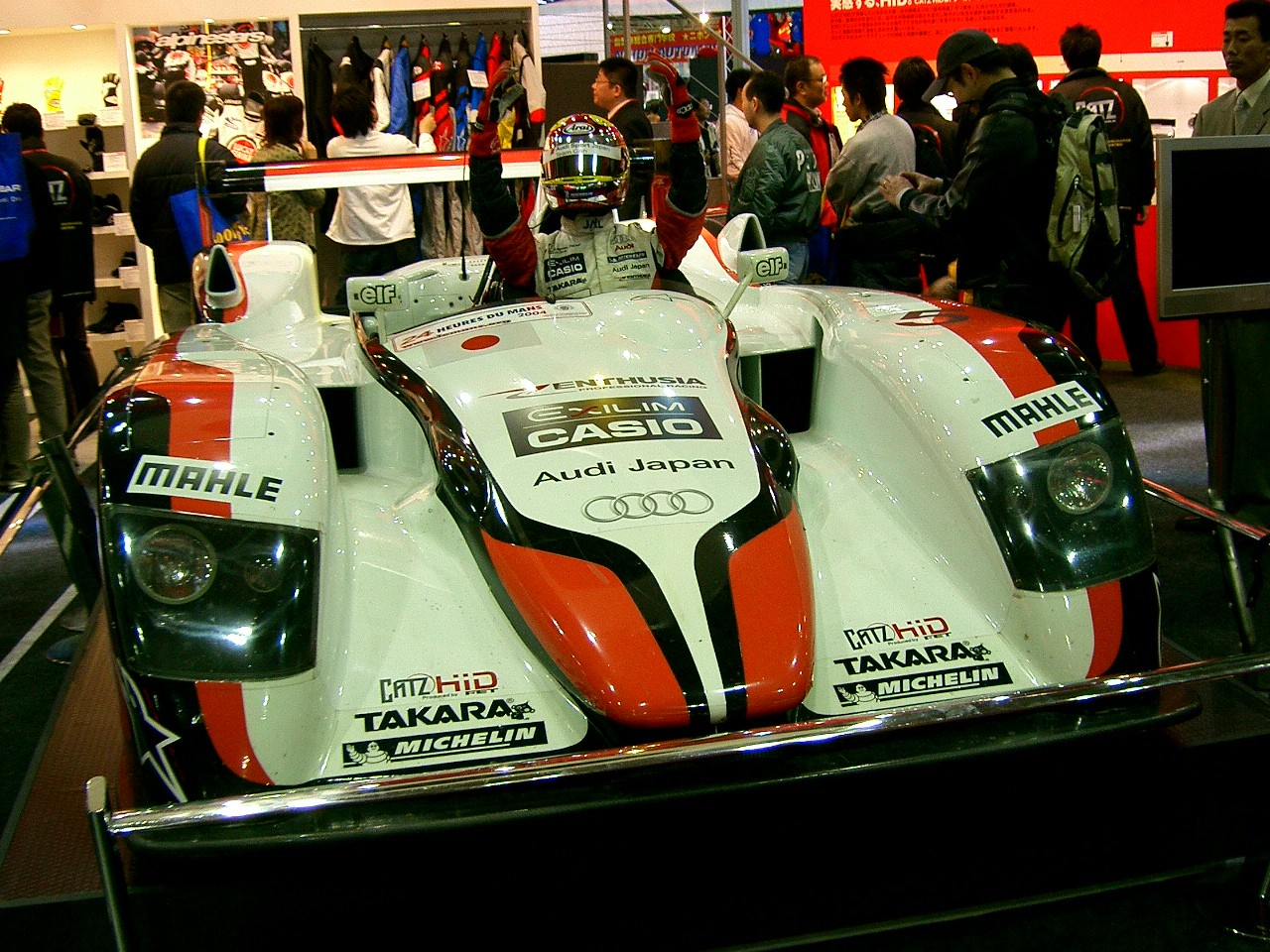
Team Goh's Audi R8 which won the 2004 24 Hours of Le Mans

In 2001, Team Goh partnered with the Danish Den Blå Avis team, running a Dome-Judd in the FIA Sportscar Championship, earning two wins and finishing second in the championship. The following year, Kazumichi Goh purchased an Audi R8, as part of a three-year program at Le Mans. The team finished in seventh in 2002 and fourth in 2003. Goh also participated in the 1000 km of Spa and 1000 km of Le Mans, winning both events with drivers Seiji Ara and Tom Kristensen.

In 2004, Goh entered the new Le Mans Endurance Series with their R8, finishing the season third in the championship. At the 24 Hours of Le Mans, Goh drivers Ara and Kristensen were joined by Rinaldo Capello, and won the race overall, becoming only the second Japanese team to take the overall victory.

The team then focused on a return to the JGTC, which had by then been renamed to Super GT, acquiring a new GT1-spec Maserati MC12 with the aim of entering the 2006 season. However, the GT1-spec car was well off the pace of its Japanese GT500-class competitors during pre-season testing, causing the team to withdraw from the championship.

Three years later, the team would return to competition, entering a Porsche RS Spyder in the 2009 24 Hours of Le Mans. It was running second in class when driver Seiji Ara suffered a large accident on the Mulsanne Straight, forcing the car's retirement. It would turn out to be the team's only outing with the Porsche, as the car was sold in August 2009, only two months after the race. Moreover, the race turned out to be Goh's only outing in what was planned to be a multi-year programme, as the collapse of the team's title sponsor in February 2010 forced the suspension of all activity.

=== 2019 ===
In 2019, after a hiatus of nearly nine years, Kazumichi Goh announced the return of Team Goh, along with a new partnership with McLaren. Competing as McLaren Customer Racing Japan, Team Goh planned to field a McLaren 720S GT3 in Super GT's GT300 class, alongside an additional 720S in the 2019 Suzuka 10 Hours. The team had originally planned to enter its second car in the Super Taikyu series, but was forced to abandon its plans prior to the season opener, citing a lack of parts. The team later withdrew from the Suzuka 10 Hours as well, citing a Balance of Performance that Goh felt was unfavorable to the team's McLarens. Goh's Super GT entry did go ahead, the team contesting all rounds of the season save for the flyaway Buriram round. After a disappointing season in which the team finished 14th in the teams' standings despite taking a podium at Autopolis and pole at Motegi, the team withdrew from Super GT at the end of 2019.

=== 2020 ===
Team Goh partnered with Dale Coyne Racing for the 2020 IndyCar Series, entering the series as Dale Coyne Racing with Team Goh, with its ex-Super GT driver Alex Palou driving the team's No. 55 entry. Palou finished third in just his third career start at Road America. He would finish the season 16th in the drivers' standings, before Palou and Team Goh departed Dale Coyne Racing ahead of the 2021 IndyCar season.

In 2020, Team Goh announced a partnership with BMW Team Studie in Super GT, with McLaren Customer Racing Japan now operating as Customer Racing Support Limited (CSL). Kazumichi Goh was named the General Manager of BMW Team Studie x CSL's GT300 entry, and Seiji Ara was named one of the team's drivers, alongside gentleman racer Tomohide Yamaguchi. Goh's involvement with BMW Team Studie continued for the 2021 and 2022 seasons.

=== 2021 ===
In 2021, Team Goh partnered with Team Mugen to form Red Bull Mugen Team Goh, which entered the number 15 Red Bull Dallara SF19/Honda for Hiroki Otsu in the Super Formula Championship. Otsu finished the season sixth in the drivers' championship and won Rookie of the Year honours, while Mugen/Team Goh finished seventh in the teams' championship with their single car entry.

=== 2022 ===
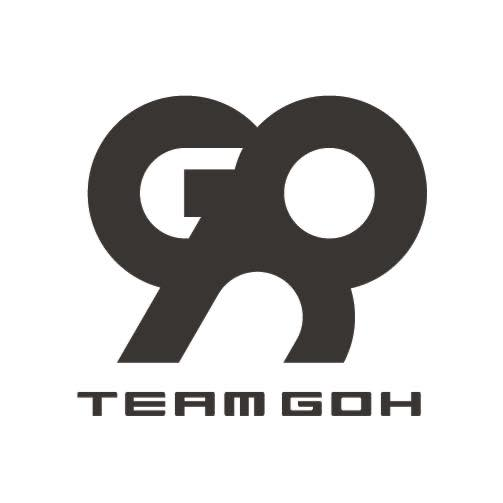
Team Goh logo

For their second season in Super Formula, Team Goh ran as an independent, two-car team with Honda engines. Kazuhiro Ikeda, the president of Servus Japan, succeeded Kazumichi Goh as the team principal and representative director of the company, while Red Bull junior driver Ren Sato and Atsushi Miyake were announced as the drivers for the 2022 season. The former Honda Formula One project manager, Masashi Yamamoto, was appointed the team manager. Sato finished the season twelfth in the drivers' championship, with Miyake fifteenth. The team finished seventh in the teams' championship for the second year in a row.

=== TGM Grand Prix (2023 - Current) ===
Following the loss of Red Bull backing, Team Goh withdrew from Super Formula at the end of the season. Its former partner Servus Japan took over the entry for the 2023 season, renaming the team TGM Grand Prix. TGM is short for 'Team Goh Motorsport' in a nod to the team's former identity. They signed Toshiki Oyu and rookie Cem Bölükbaşı, who competed in Formula 2 in 2022. Bölükbaşı was the first Turkish driver to race in the series. Toshiki Oyu suffered from a broken collarbone during training ahead of round 6. Hiroki Otsu once again stepped in as a replacement driver. Ahead of the final Suzuka weekend, TGM Grand Prix announced that Toshiki Oyu would not be competing in the double-header, with Riki Okusa as the replacement driver making his Super Formula debut.

Juju Noda or will be known as "Juju" make her debut in Super Formula with the Team for 2024.

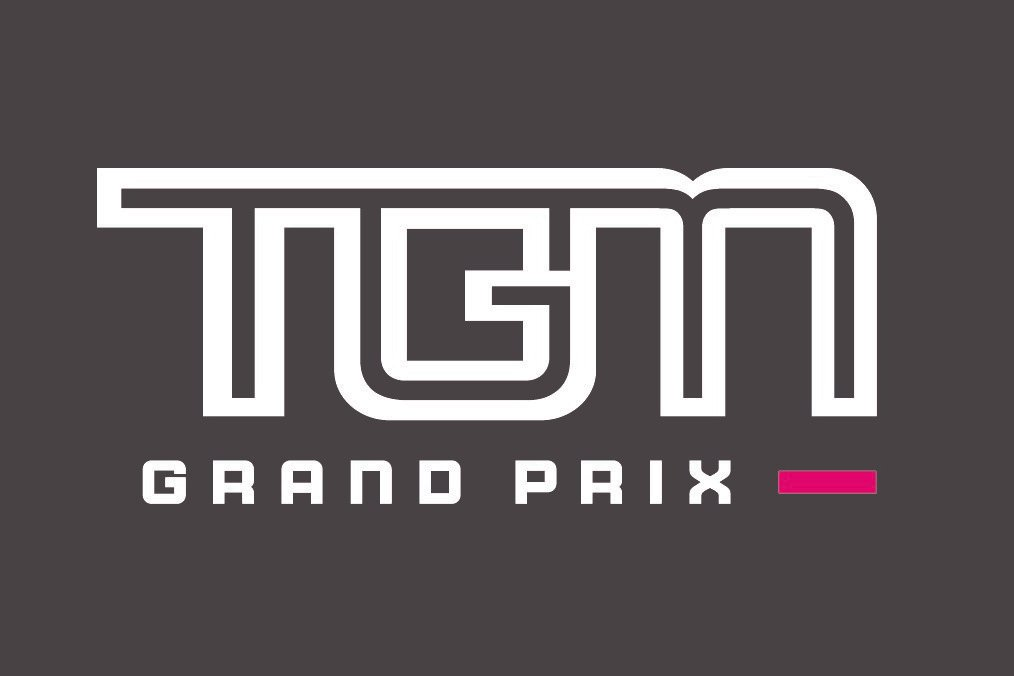
TGM Grand Prix previous logo

TGM Grand Prix changed both their name and their engine supplier. The team will no longer run Honda engines and instead now joined Rookie Racing in serving as Toyota Gazoo Racing's junior team, called TGR-DC. The team also acquired a new title sponsor in telecommunications operator KDDI, with the team entering the 2025 season under the name KDDI TGMGP TGR-DC.

== Racing results ==
=== 24 Hours of Le Mans ===
Year	Entrant	No.	Car	Drivers	Class	Laps	Pos.	Class Pos.
1997	(Japan) Team Lark McLaren	44	McLaren F1 GTR	(United Kingdom) Gary Ayles (Japan) Akihiko Nakaya (Japan) Keiichi Tsuchiya	LMGT1	88	DNF	DNF
1999	(Japan) Team Goh (United Kingdom) David Price Racing	19	BMW V12 LM	(Japan) Hiroki Katoh (Japan) Hiro Matsushita (Japan) Akihiko Nakaya	LMP	223	DNF	DNF
2000	(Japan) TV Asahi Team Dragon	22	Panoz LMP-1 Roadster-S	(Japan) Akira Iida (Japan) Masahiko Kondo (Japan) Keiichi Tsuchiya	LMP900	330	8th	7th
2000	(Japan) TV Asahi Team Dragon	23	Panoz LMP-1 Roadster-S	(Japan) Masahiko Kageyama (Japan) Masami Kageyama (Japan) Toshio Suzuki	LMP900	340	6th	6th
2000	(Japan) Team Goh (United Kingdom) Chamberlain Engineering	56	Chrysler Viper GTS-R	(Switzerland) Walter Brun (Germany) Christian Gläsel (Switzerland) Toni Seiler	LMGTS	210	DNF	DNF
2001	(Denmark) Team Den Blå Avis-Goh	10	Dome S101	(Denmark) Casper Elgaard (Japan) Hiroki Katoh (Denmark) John Nielsen	LMP900	66	DNF	DNF
2002	Audi Sport Japan Team Goh	5	Audi R8	(Japan) Seiji Ara (France) Yannick Dalmas (Japan) Hiroki Katoh	LMP900	358	7th	6th
2003	Audi Sport Japan Team Goh	5	Audi R8	(Japan) Seiji Ara (Denmark) Jan Magnussen (Germany) Marco Werner	LMP900	370	4th	**2nd**
2004	Audi Sport Japan Team Goh	5	Audi R8	(Japan) Seiji Ara (Italy) Rinaldo Capello (Denmark) Tom Kristensen	LMP1	379	**1st**	**1st**
2009	(Japan) Navi Team Goh	5	Porsche RS Spyder Evo	(Japan) Seiji Ara (Japan) Keisuke Kunimoto (Germany) Sascha Maassen	LMP2	339	DNF	DNF

=== IndyCar Series ===
(key)

Year	Chassis	Engine	Drivers	No.	1	2	3	4	5	6	7	8	9	10	11	12	13	14	Pos.	Pts.
Dale Coyne Racing with Team Goh
2020					TEX	IMS	ROA	ROA	IOW	IOW	INDY	GTW	GTW	MDO	MDO	IMS	IMS	STP		
2020	Dallara DW12	Honda HI20TT V6t	(Spain) Álex Palou R	55	23	19	3	7	11	14	28	15	12	12	23	17	9	13	16th	238

=== Super Formula ===
(key) (Races in bold indicate pole position) (Races in italics indicate fastest lap)

Year	Chassis	Engine	No.	Drivers	1	2	3	4	5	6	7	8	9	10	D.C.	Pts	T.C.	Pts
As Red Bull Mugen Team Goh
2021	Dallara SF19	Honda	15	(Japan) Hiroki Otsu	FUJ; 16	SUZ; 5	AUT; 6	SUG; 10	MOT; 10	**MOT**; 1	SUZ; 5				6th	38.5	7th	35.5
As Team Goh
2022	Dallara SF19	Honda	53	(Japan) Ren Sato	FUJ; 9	FUJ; 13	SUZ; 10	AUT; 17	SUG; 16	FUJ; 6	MOT; 12	MOT; 7	SUZ; 3	SUZ; 19	12th	25	7th	44
2022	Dallara SF19	Honda	55	(Japan) Atsushi Miyake	FUJ; 10	FUJ; 5	SUZ; Ret	AUT; 3	SUG; 18	FUJ; Ret	MOT; Ret	MOT; 15	SUZ; 12	SUZ; 8	14th	21	7th	44
As TGM Grand Prix
2023	Dallara SF23	Honda	53	(Japan) Toshiki Oyu	FUJ; 7	FUJ; 20	**SUZ**; Ret	AUT; Ret	**SUG**; Ret		MOT; 3				9th	22	9th	20
2023	Dallara SF23	Honda	53	(Japan) Hiroki Otsu						FUJ; 21†					24th	0	9th	20
2023	Dallara SF23	Honda	53	(Japan) Riki Okusa								SUZ; 18	SUZ; 13		23rd	0	9th	20
2023	Dallara SF23	Honda	55	(Turkey) Cem Bölükbaşı	FUJ; 8	FUJ; 17	SUZ; 9	AUT; 15	SUG; 17	FUJ; 18	MOT; 11	SUZ; 20	SUZ; 15		18th	5	9th	20
2024	Dallara SF23	Honda	53	(Japan) "Juju"	SUZ; 17	AUT; 20	SUG; 18	FUJ; 19	MOT; 18	FUJ; 17	FUJ; 16	SUZ; 12	SUZ; 20		21st	0	9th	3
2024	Dallara SF23	Honda	55	(Japan) Nobuharu Matsushita	SUZ; 8	AUT; 16	SUG; 19								15th	3	9th	3
2024	Dallara SF23	Honda	55	(Japan) Hiroki Otsu				FUJ; 14	MOT; 15	FUJ; 19	FUJ; 13	SUZ; Ret	SUZ; Ret		22nd	0	9th	3
