= IndyCar Classic =

IndyCar Series
- Venue: Circuit of the Americas
- First race: 2019
- Last race: 2019
- Distance: 204.6 miles (329.3 km)
- Laps: 60
- Most wins (driver): Colton Herta (1)
- Most wins (team): Harding Steinbrenner Racing (1)
- Most wins (manufacturer): Chassis: Dallara (1); Engine: Honda (1)

Circuit information
- Surface: Asphalt
- Length: 3.426 mi (5.514 km)
- Turns: 20
- Lap record: Will Power (1:46.0177, Dallara DW12, 2019, IndyCar Series)

The IndyCar Classic was an IndyCar Series race that was held at Circuit of the Americas (COTA) in Austin, Texas. The only running of the race took place on March 24, 2019, and was won by Colton Herta. In 2020, the race was cancelled due to the COVID-19 pandemic, and it was not included on the 2021 IndyCar Series schedule.

== History ==
=== Background ===
Circuit of the Americas (COTA) in Austin, Texas, was built to Formula One (F1) specifications to host the United States Grand Prix starting in 2012. Situated in the rolling hills southeast of the city, it is a 20-turn, 3.427-mile (5.515 km) road course. In 2018, Phoenix was removed from the 2019 IndyCar Series schedule, which opened up a gap in the calendar. At the same time, COTA chairman and CEO Bobby Epstein emphasized the track's desire to be fully prepared for hosting a new event after previously concentrating on its F1 and MotoGP races.

Furthermore, a territorial restriction agreement that the IndyCar Series had with Texas Motor Speedway (TMS) had previously prevented the series from running races at COTA or other venues in Texas. However, negotiations between IndyCar and TMS president Eddie Gossage resulted in the series giving the track a discounted sanction fee in exchange for TMS allowing the series to schedule other races in Texas. At the time of the negotiations in August 2018, Jim Ayello of The Indianapolis Star speculated that the new deal between the series and TMS would allow IndyCar to run at either COTA or a new street circuit in San Antonio. Ultimately, the series scheduled a race in Austin as a replacement for its former Phoenix race. While Gossage had previously expressed concern that Texas could not adequately support two IndyCar races, Epstein opined that TMS and COTA are far enough apart that their races will not adversely affect each other.

The IndyCar Classic was one of two additions to the 2019 IndyCar Series schedule, which officially revealed that COTA had obtained a race as part of a multi-year agreement when it was released on September 4, 2018. COTA was joined on the 2019 schedule by a revived Grand Prix of Monterey on September 22, the season finale and the first IndyCar race at Laguna Seca in 15 years. COTA's IndyCar Classic was the second race of the 2019 season, following the season-opening Grand Prix of St. Petersburg two weeks earlier on March 10. The placement of the Austin race, as well as the forward shift of the Grand Prix of Alabama that followed it, reduced the number of long gaps in the early portion of the season.

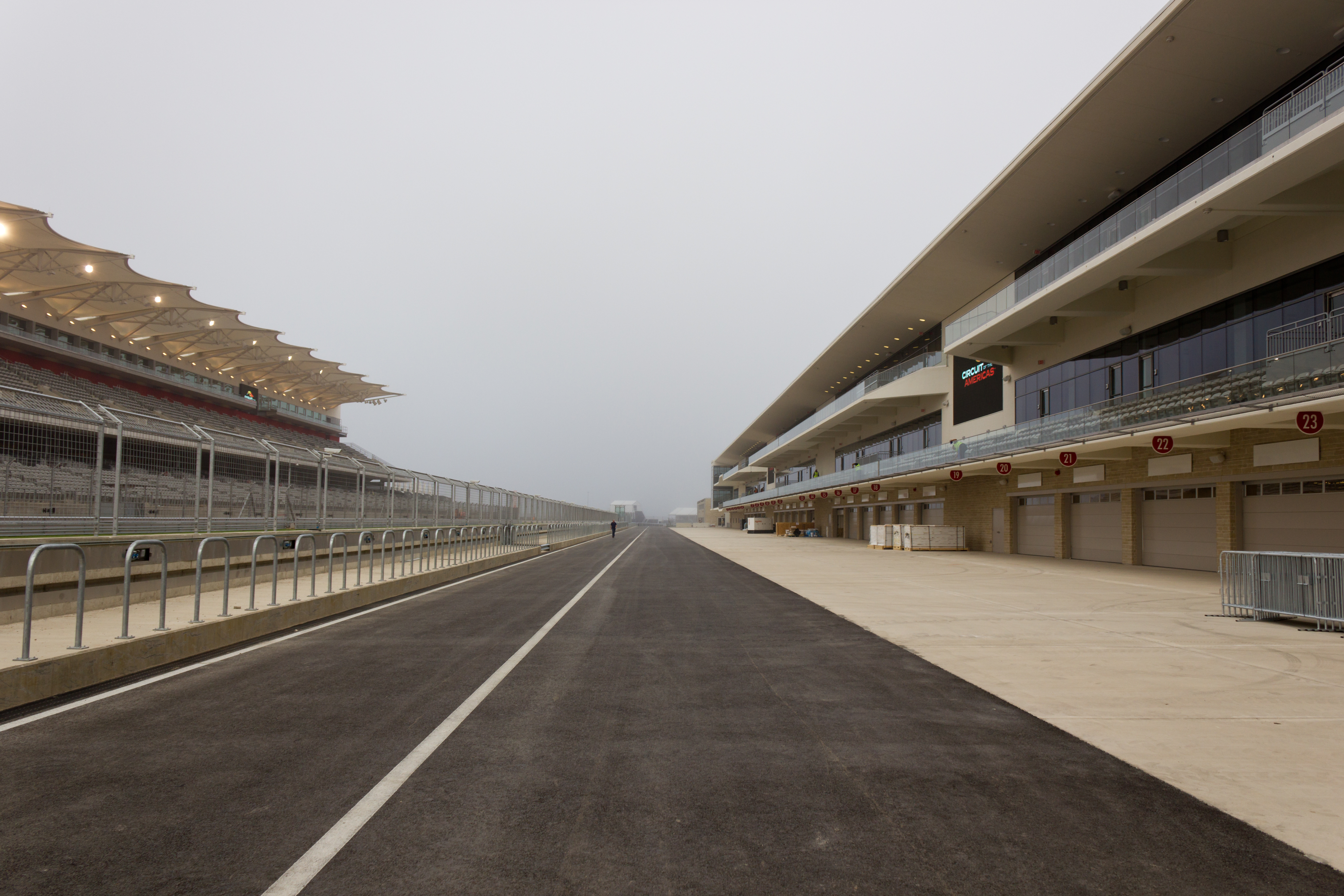
Pit lane at Circuit of the Americas

The 2019 IndyCar Classic was also the first time that American open-wheel cars and F1 raced at the same track during the same season since 2006, when the now-defunct Champ Car World Series and F1 both raced at Montreal. In September 2018, COTA was considering modifying its track layout for the IndyCar Classic, similarly to what it had previously done for the Australian-based V8 Supercars Austin 400 race, but Epstein did not speculate about what modifications might be made. In its F1 layout at 3.427 miles (5.515 km) in length, COTA was the second-longest track on IndyCar's 2019 schedule, trailing only Road America at 4.048 miles (6.515 km) long.

=== Testing ===
In late October 2018, Tony Kanaan and Alexander Rossi became the first IndyCar drivers to test at COTA. The entire field of full-season drivers tested at the track for the series-mandated IndyCar Spring Training on February 12–13, 2019. The second day featured an open period during which each team had 11 hours to test the performance of its cars, while there was also nearly 5 hours of testing for Indy Lights teams.

Rookie Colton Herta described the racing at COTA as likely to be "spectacular" because of the overtaking opportunities it offers. Rossi, who finished 12th in the 2015 United States Grand Prix at COTA racing for Manor Marussia, stated he was "very happy" that the IndyCar Series is "headed to the best road course". He also described COTA as "unlike any other track...by far the smoothest, widest track that we have". Andretti Autosport CEO Michael Andretti added that he had "been pushing for this race for a long time".

=== 2019 ===
The inaugural IndyCar Classic was held at COTA on March 24, 2019. It was a 60-lap event that was won by rookie Colton Herta of Harding Steinbrenner Racing, who became the youngest race winner in IndyCar Series history at 18 years, 11 months, and 25 days of age.

Muse played a headlining concert the night before the race, on Saturday, March 23. Additional concerts (including one by local act Asleep at the Wheel) and RV camping took place during the entire race weekend, between Friday, March 22, and Sunday, March 24.

=== 2020 and cancellation ===
AutoNation IndyCar Challenge race logo

The 2020 race, which would have been renamed the IndyCar Challenge and would have been sponsored by AutoNation, was cancelled due to the COVID-19 pandemic. The race was not included on the 2021 IndyCar Series schedule.

== Race results ==
=== NTT IndyCar Series ===
Season	Date	Driver	Team	Chassis	Engine	Race Distance		Race Time	Average Speed (mph)	Report	Ref
Season	Date	Driver	Team	Chassis	Engine	Laps	Miles (km)	Race Time	Average Speed (mph)	Report	Ref
2019	March 24	(United States) Colton Herta	Harding Steinbrenner Racing	Dallara	Honda	60	204.6 (329.3)	2:00:02	102.271	Report	
2020	April 26	Canceled due to the coronavirus (COVID-19) pandemic									

== Support events ==
=== Indy Lights ===
Season	Date	Winning driver	Winning team	Chassis	Engine	Refs
2019	March 23	(United States) Oliver Askew	Andretti Autosport	Dallara	AER	
2019	March 24	(United States) Oliver Askew	Andretti Autosport	Dallara	AER	
2020	Canceled due to the coronavirus (COVID-19) pandemic					

=== Stadium Super Trucks ===
Season	Date	Winning driver	Ref
2019	March 23	(United States) Blade Hildebrand	
2019	March 24	(Australia) Matthew Brabham	

=== GT World Challenge America ===
Season	Date	Winning driver
2020	Canceled due to the coronavirus (COVID-19) pandemic	
