= Robert Citrone =

American billionaire hedge fund manager

Robert K. Citrone
- Born: November 8, 1964 (age 61); Latrobe, Pennsylvania, U.S.
- Education: Hampden-Sydney College (BA); University of Virginia (MBA)
- Occupation: Hedge fund manager
- Known for: Co-founder, Discovery Capital Management
- Spouse: Cindy Citrone
- Children: 4

Robert K. Citrone (born November 8, 1964) is an American billionaire hedge fund manager, the co-founder of Discovery Capital Management, and minority owner of the Pittsburgh Steelers.

== Biography ==
Citrone was born in Latrobe, Pennsylvania, and grew up in Pittsburgh. Citrone received a bachelor's degree in Economics and Math with honors from Hampden–Sydney College in 1987. After a short stint in the fixed income trading group at First Boston, Citrone enrolled in the MBA program at the University of Virginia Darden School of Business where he graduated as a Shermet Scholar in 1990.

In 1990, Citrone was hired as a corporate-bond analyst at Fidelity Investments. At Fidelity, Citrone ran the Emerging Market Fixed Income and Currency Group, which he grew to over $7 billion in assets under management. He resigned from Fidelity in 1995 and joined Tiger Management. At Tiger, Citrone worked as a managing director and led global emerging market investments. In 1999, Citrone co-founded Discovery Capital Management.

In September 2025, it was reported that Treasury Secretary Scott Bessent’s $20 billion Argentinian bailout would deliver a significant windfall to Citrone, an old friend of Bessent's. Bessent and Citrone had been colleagues while working for Soros Fund Management.

== Personal life ==
Citrone has four children with his wife, Cindy. He and Cindy are minority owners of the Pittsburgh Steelers. In 2016, they were awarded the Dr. Freddie Fu Sports Leadership Award for giving back to their hometown.
