= 2020 Genesys 300 =

(United States) 2020 Genesys 300
Race details
1st round of the 2020 IndyCar Series season
Next race →
- Date: June 6, 2020
- Official name: Genesys 300
- Location: Texas Motor Speedway
- Course: Oval; 1.5 mi / 2.4 km
- Distance: 200 laps 300 mi / 482.803 km

Pole position
- Driver: (United States) Josef Newgarden (Team Penske)
- Time: 24.0227 + 24.0351 = 48.0578

Fastest lap
- Driver: (Sweden) Felix Rosenqvist (Chip Ganassi Racing)
- Time: 24.1088 (on lap 189 of 200)

Podium
- First: (New Zealand) Scott Dixon (Chip Ganassi Racing)
- Second: (France) Simon Pagenaud (Team Penske)
- Third: (United States) Josef Newgarden (Team Penske)

The 2020 Genesys 300 was an IndyCar Series event that was held on June 6, 2020 at Texas Motor Speedway in Fort Worth, Texas. It was the opening event of the 2020 IndyCar Series, due to race cancellations and postponements tied to the COVID-19 pandemic.

It marked the first IndyCar Series start for eventual five-time series champion and 2025 Indianapolis 500 winner Álex Palou.

== Background ==
On May 7, 2020, it was announced that the season would commence with a condensed, one-day event format at Texas Motor Speedway. Although intended to be run without spectators, Sonic Automotive (which owns the circuit under their Speedway Motorsports subsidiary) followed protocol in use at their NASCAR weekend at Charlotte by allowing owners and tenants of the Turn 2 Lone Star Towers office and condominium complex to have tickets and parking passes to watch the event from their units. Drivers and crew members were subject to social distancing and health screening protocols, and use of face coverings was mandated. Practice, qualifying and the race took place on the same day, requiring it to be shortened from 248 laps or around 600 kilometres (370 miles), to 200 laps (300 miles).

As the pandemic prevented Firestone from manufacturing new tire compounds for the race, existing compounds were used instead. The right-hand tires had originally been manufactured for tests at the track in 2019, simulating the effects of the new aeroscreen introduced to all vehicles for the 2020 season. The left-hand tires were originally manufactured for the 2019 Indianapolis 500. Due to these tire variances, Firestone and IndyCar required that these tires be replaced after 35 laps of use, with each car provided with nine sets of tires to use across the day.

=== Entry list ===
In May 2020, DragonSpeed revealed that it planned to prioritize an entry for the rescheduled Indianapolis 500, so that it could initially focus on its core European Le Mans Series operations. On June 2, Carlin withdrew its entry for the race in the #31, citing economic impacts of the pandemic in Europe.

Car No.	Driver Name	Owner/Team	Engine
1	(United States) Josef Newgarden W	Team Penske	Chevrolet
4	(United States) Charlie Kimball	A. J. Foyt Enterprises	Chevrolet
5	(Mexico) Patricio O'Ward	Arrow McLaren SP	Chevrolet
7	(United States) Oliver Askew R	Arrow McLaren SP	Chevrolet
8	(Sweden) Marcus Ericsson	Chip Ganassi Racing	Honda
9	(New Zealand) Scott Dixon W	Chip Ganassi Racing	Honda
10	(Sweden) Felix Rosenqvist	Chip Ganassi Racing	Honda
12	(Australia) Will Power W	Team Penske	Chevrolet
14	(Brazil) Tony Kanaan W	A. J. Foyt Enterprises	Chevrolet
15	(United States) Graham Rahal W	Rahal Letterman Lanigan Racing	Honda
18	(United States) Santino Ferrucci	Dale Coyne Racing with Vasser-Sullivan	Honda
20	(United States) Ed Carpenter W	Ed Carpenter Racing	Chevrolet
21	(Netherlands) Rinus VeeKay R	Ed Carpenter Racing	Chevrolet
22	(France) Simon Pagenaud	Team Penske	Chevrolet
26	(United States) Zach Veach	Andretti Autosport	Honda
27	(United States) Alexander Rossi	Andretti Autosport	Honda
28	(United States) Ryan Hunter-Reay	Andretti Autosport	Honda
29	(Canada) James Hinchcliffe	Andretti Autosport	Honda
30	(Japan) Takuma Sato	Rahal Letterman Lanigan Racing	Honda
55	(Spain) Álex Palou R	Dale Coyne Racing with Team Goh	Honda
59	(United States) Conor Daly	Carlin	Chevrolet
60	(United Kingdom) Jack Harvey	Meyer Shank Racing	Honda
88	(United States) Colton Herta	Andretti Harding Steinbrenner Autosport	Honda
98	(United States) Marco Andretti	Andretti Herta Autosport with Marco Andretti & Curb-Agajanian	Honda

All cars ran a Dallara safety tub utilizing the IndyCar mandated Universal Aero Kit 18. All cars also utilized Firestone tires.

=== Withdrawn ===
Car No.	Driver Name	Owner/Team	Engine
31	Unnamed	Carlin	Chevrolet
81	Ben Hanley	DragonSpeed	Chevrolet

Key	Meaning
R	Rookie
W	Past winner

== Full Results ==
Key	Meaning
R	Rookie
W	Past winner

=== Practice ===
Practice ran on race day from 12:30 p.m. to 2:30 p.m. CT

Pos	No.	Name	Lap Time	Avg. Speed
1	9	(New Zealand) Scott Dixon W	24.0006	215.995 mph (347.610 km/h)
2	88	(United States) Colton Herta	24.1689	214.491 mph (345.190 km/h)
3	5	(Mexico) Patricio O'Ward	24.1875	214.326 mph (344.924 km/h)
4	26	(United States) Zach Veach	24.1906	214.298 mph (344.879 km/h)
5	98	(United States) Marco Andretti	24.1945	214.264 mph (344.824 km/h)
6	30	(Japan) Takuma Sato	24.2437	213.826 mph (344.120 km/h)
7	1	(United States) Josef Newgarden	24.3029	213.308 mph (343.286 km/h)
8	22	(France) Simon Pagenaud	24.3128	213.221 mph (343.146 km/h)
9	15	(United States) Graham Rahal	24.3179	213.176 mph (343.074 km/h)
10	10	(Sweden) Felix Rosenqvist	24.3974	212.482 mph (341.957 km/h)
11	4	(United States) Charlie Kimball	24.4184	212.299 mph (341.662 km/h)
12	12	(Australia) Will Power	24.4281	212.215 mph (341.527 km/h)
13	8	(Sweden) Marcus Ericsson	24.4408	212.104 mph (341.348 km/h)
14	55	(Spain) Alex Palou R	24.4446	212.071 mph (341.295 km/h)
15	7	(United States) Oliver Askew R	24.4842	211.728 mph (340.743 km/h)
16	27	(United States) Alexander Rossi	24.4853	211.719 mph (340.729 km/h)
17	29	(Canada) James Hinchcliffe	24.4979	211.610 mph (340.553 km/h)
18	20	(United States) Ed Carpenter	24.5508	211.154 mph (339.819 km/h)
19	14	(Brazil) Tony Kanaan	24.5521	211.143 mph (339.802 km/h)
20	59	(United States) Conor Daly	24.5561	211.108 mph (339.745 km/h)
21	28	(United States) Ryan Hunter-Reay	24.6094	210.617 mph (338.955 km/h)
22	18	(United States) Santino Ferrucci	24.6094	210.617 mph (338.955 km/h)
23	21	(Netherlands) Rinus VeeKay R	25.0564	209.893 mph (337.790 km/h)
24	60	(United Kingdom) Jack Harvey	25.2599	205.226 mph (330.279 km/h)

=== Qualifying ===
Qualifying was run on race day starting at 5 p.m. (ET)

Pos	No.	Name	Lap 1 Time	Lap 2 Time	Total Time	Avg. Speed
1	1	(United States) Josef Newgarden	24.0227	24.0351	48.0578	215.740 mph (347.200 km/h)
2	9	(New Zealand) Scott Dixon	24.0393	24.0413	48.0806	215.638 mph (347.036 km/h)
3	22	(France) Simon Pagenaud	24.0507	24.0686	48.1193	215.464 mph (346.756 km/h)
4	28	(United States) Ryan Hunter-Reay	24.2439	24.1344	48.3783	214.311 mph (344.900 km/h)
5	26	(United States) Zach Veach	24.2942	24.1588	48.4530	213.981 mph (344.369 km/h)
6	12	(Australia) Will Power	24.2708	24.1937	48.4645	213.930 mph (344.287 km/h)
7	15	(United States) Graham Rahal	24.2734	24.2029	48.4763	213.878 mph (344.203 km/h)
8	27	(United States) Alexander Rossi	24.2336	24.2855	48.5191	213.689 mph (343.899 km/h)
9	10	(Sweden) Felix Rosenqvist	24.3100	24.2384	48.5484	213.560 mph (343.692 km/h)
10	14	(Brazil) Tony Kanaan	24.3959	24.1917	48.5876	213.388 mph (343.415 km/h)
11	98	(United States) Marco Andretti	24.2882	24.3444	48.6326	213.190 mph (343.096 km/h)
12	4	(United States) Charlie Kimball	24.4347	24.2917	48.7264	212.780 mph (342.436 km/h)
13	20	(United States) Ed Carpenter	24.4153	24.3261	48.7414	212.714 mph (342.330 km/h)
14	88	(United States) Colton Herta	24.3807	24.3648	48.7455	212.697 mph (342.303 km/h)
15	29	(Canada) James Hinchcliffe	24.3560	24.4109	48.7669	212.603 mph (342.151 km/h)
16	55	(Spain) Álex Palou	24.5459	24.2437	48.7896	212.504 mph (341.992 km/h)
17	8	(Sweden) Marcus Ericsson	24.4232	24.4733	48.8965	212.040 mph (341.245 km/h)
18	5	(Mexico) Patricio O'Ward	24.4068	24.4959	48.9027	212.013 mph (341.202 km/h)
19	59	(United States) Conor Daly	24.5452	24.4934	49.0386	211.425 mph (340.256 km/h)
20	7	(United States) Oliver Askew	24.7092	24.4657	49.1749	210.839 mph (339.312 km/h)
21	60	(United Kingdom) Jack Harvey	25.2665	25.1499	50.4164	205.647 mph (330.957 km/h)
22	30	(Japan) Takuma Sato	Wrecked during attempt		No Time	No Speed
23	21	(Netherlands) Rinus VeeKay	Did not attempt		No Time	No Speed
24	18	(United States) Santino Ferrucci	Did not attempt		No Time	No Speed

=== Race ===
Pos	No.	Driver	Team	Engine	Laps	Time/Status	Pit Stops	Grid	Laps Led	Pts.^{1}
1	9	(New Zealand) Scott Dixon W	Chip Ganassi Racing	Honda	200	1:38:37.7648	5	2	157	53
2	22	(France) Simon Pagenaud	Team Penske	Chevrolet	200	+4.410	5	3		40
3	1	(United States) Josef Newgarden W	Team Penske	Chevrolet	200	+5.806	5	1	41	37
4	26	(United States) Zach Veach	Andretti Autosport	Honda	200	+6.577	5	5	2	33
5	20	(United States) Ed Carpenter W	Ed Carpenter Racing	Chevrolet	200	+6.948	5	13		30
6	59	(United States) Conor Daly	Carlin	Chevrolet	200	+7.576	5	19		28
7	88	(United States) Colton Herta	Andretti Harding Steinbrenner Autosport	Honda	200	+8.055	5	14		26
8	28	(United States) Ryan Hunter-Reay	Andretti Autosport	Honda	200	+8.310	6	4		24
9	7	(United States) Oliver Askew R	Arrow McLaren SP	Chevrolet	200	+8.694	5	20		22
10	14	(Brazil) Tony Kanaan W	A. J. Foyt Enterprises	Chevrolet	200	+8.963	5	10		20
11	4	(United States) Charlie Kimball	A. J. Foyt Enterprises	Chevrolet	199	Contact	6	12		19
12	5	(Mexico) Patricio O'Ward	Arrow McLaren SP	Chevrolet	199	+1 Lap	5	18		18
13	12	(Australia) Will Power W	Team Penske	Chevrolet	199	+1 Lap	5	6		17
14	98	(United States) Marco Andretti	Andretti Herta Autosport w/ Marco Andretti & Curb-Agajanian	Honda	199	+1 Lap	5	11		16
15	27	(United States) Alexander Rossi	Andretti Autosport	Honda	199	+1 Lap	7	8		15
16	60	(United Kingdom) Jack Harvey	Meyer Shank Racing	Honda	199	+1 Lap	5	21		14
17	15	(United States) Graham Rahal W	Rahal Letterman Lanigan Racing	Honda	198	+2 Laps	7	7		13
18	29	(Canada) James Hinchcliffe	Andretti Autosport	Honda	198	+2 Laps	5	15		12
19	8	(Sweden) Marcus Ericsson	Chip Ganassi Racing	Honda	196	+4 Laps	6	17		11
20	10	(Sweden) Felix Rosenqvist	Chip Ganassi Racing	Honda	190	Contact	5	9		10
21	18	(United States) Santino Ferrucci	Dale Coyne Racing w/ Vasser-Sullivan	Honda	156	Mechanical	4	23		9
22	21	(Netherlands) Rinus VeeKay R	Ed Carpenter Racing	Chevrolet	36	Contact	1	24		8
23	55	(Spain) Álex Palou R	Dale Coyne Racing w/ Team Goh	Honda	36	Contact	1	16		7
DNS	30	(Japan) Takuma Sato	Rahal Letterman Lanigan Racing	Honda	0	Did Not Start, Qualifying crash	0	22		6

Notes: ^{1} Points include 1 point for leading at least 1 lap during a race, an additional 2 points for leading the most race laps, and 1 point for Pole Position.

=== Race statistics ===
Average speed: 175.201 mph (281.959 km/h)

Lead changes: 5

Lap leader breakdown
From lap	To lap	Total laps	Driver
1	31	31	Josef Newgarden
32	34	3	Scott Dixon
35	36	2	Zach Veach
37	80	44	Scott Dixon
81	90	10	Josef Newgarden
91	200	110	Scott Dixon

Cautions: 4 for 24 laps
From lap	To lap	Total laps	Reason
38	45	8	#21 (VeeKay), & #55 (Palou) accident backstretch
77	85	9	Debris
191	196	6	#10 (Rosenqvist) accident turn 2
200	200	1	#4 (Kimball) accident backstretch

== Championship standings after the race ==
Drivers' Championship standings

Pos	Driver	Points
1	(New Zealand) Scott Dixon	53
2	(France) Simon Pagenaud	40
3	(United States) Josef Newgarden	37
4	(United States) Zach Veach	33
5	(United States) Ed Carpenter	30

Engine Manufacturer standings

Pos	Manufacturer	Points
1	Honda	87
2	Chevrolet	76

- Note: Only the top five positions are included.

== Broadcasting ==
=== Television ===
Originally scheduled for NBCSN, it was announced on May 24 that the race would move to NBC, marking the first IndyCar Series event to air in primetime on network television in seven years. With 1.285 million viewers, it was the most-watched IndyCar Series event outside of the Indianapolis 500 since 2016.

The race was called at the track with Leigh Diffey doing play-by-play, Paul Tracy and Townsend Bell as analysts, and Marty Snider and Kelli Stavast reporting on pit lane.

NBC
Booth Announcers	Pit/garage reporters
Announcer: Leigh Diffey; Driver Expert: Townsend Bell; Driver Expert: Paul Tracy	Marty Snider; Kelli Stavast

=== Radio ===
The race was carried by the IndyCar Radio Network. Mark Jaynes served as the chief announcer from WIBC Radio studios along with Davey Hamilton as Driver Expert. Jake Query called the field down the backstretch from WIBC studios. Nick Yeoman was the sole pit reporter at the track.

IndyCar Radio Network
Booth Announcers	Turn Reporters	Pit/garage reporters
Chief Announcer: Mark Jaynes; Driver Expert: Davey Hamilton	Backstretch: Jake Query	Nick Yeoman

Previous race: None, season premiere	IndyCar Series; 2020 season	Next race: 2020 IndyCar Grand Prix
Previous race: 2019 DXC Technology 600	Genesys 300	Next race: 2021 Genesys 300
