= Kevin Magnussen =

Danish racing driver (born 1992)

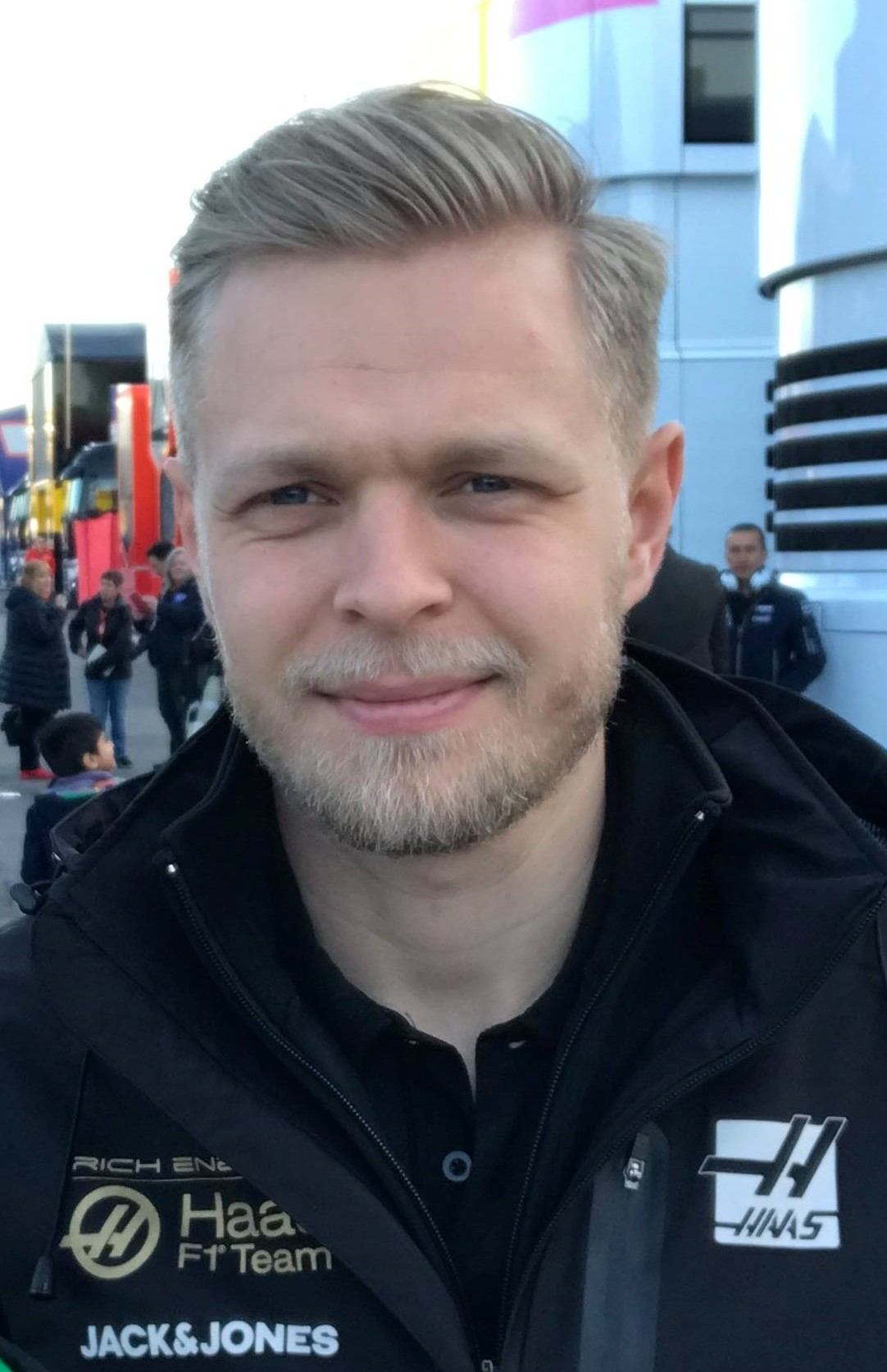
- Magnussen in 2019
- Born: Kevin Jan Magnussen; 5 October 1992 (age 34); Roskilde, Zealand, Denmark
- Spouse: Louise Gjørup (m. 2019)
- Children: 2
- Parent: Jan Magnussen (father)
- Relatives: Dennis Lind (cousin)

FIA World Endurance Championship career
- Debut season: 2025
- Current team: BMW M Team WRT
- Categorisation: FIA Platinum
- Former teams: High Class
- Starts: 16
- Championships: 0
- Wins: 1
- Podiums: 3
- Poles: 1
- Fastest laps: 0
- Best finish: 3rd in 2026

Formula One World Championship career
- Nationality: (Denmark) Danish
- Active years: 2014–2020, 2022–2024
- Team(s): McLaren, Renault, Haas
- Car number: 20
- Entries: 187 (185 starts)
- Championships: 0
- Wins: 0
- Podiums: 1
- Career points: 202
- Pole positions: 1
- Fastest laps: 3
- First entry: 2014 Australian Grand Prix
- Last entry: 2024 Abu Dhabi Grand Prix

IndyCar Series career
- 1 race run over 1 year
- Best finish: 42nd (2021)
- First race: 2021 REV Group Grand Prix at Road America (Road America)
Wins	Podiums	Poles
0	0	0

NASCAR Cup Series career
- 1 race run over 1 year
- 2026 position: 38th
- Best finish: 38th (2026)
- First race: 2026 Anduril 250 (San Diego)
Wins	Top tens	Poles
0	0	0

Previous series
- 2012–2013; 2011; 2010; 2009; 2009; 2008; 2008: Formula Renault 3.5; British F3; German F3; Formula Renault NEC; Formula Renault Eurocup; ADAC Formel Masters; Danish FFord

Championship titles
- 2013; 2008: Formula Renault 3.5; Danish FFord

Awards
- 2022: Lorenzo Bandini Trophy
- Website: kevinmagnussen.com

Kevin Jan Magnussen (Danish pronunciation: [ˈkʰɛ.ven ˈjan ˈmaw.nus.n]; born 5 October 1992), also known simply as K-Mag, is a Danish racing driver who competes in the FIA World Endurance Championship for WRT as a factory driver for BMW. He competed in Formula One from 2014 to 2020 and 2022 to 2024.

Born and raised in Roskilde, Magnussen is the son of four-time 24 Hours of Le Mans class-winner and former Formula One driver Jan Magnussen. Graduating from karting to junior formulae in 2008, Magnussen won his first championship at the 2008 Danish Formula Ford Championship. He then finished as runner-up to António Félix da Costa at the Formula Renault NEC in 2009, and to Felipe Nasr at the British Formula 3 International Series in 2011. Progressing to Formula Renault 3.5 in 2012, Magnussen won the championship the following season with DAMS.

A member of the McLaren Young Driver Programme since 2010, Magnussen signed with McLaren in 2014 to partner Jenson Button. He finished second on his Formula One debut at the Australian Grand Prix, scoring his maiden podium finish and becoming the highest-finishing debutant since Jacques Villeneuve in 1996. Replaced by Fernando Alonso for 2015, Magnussen continued at McLaren as a reserve driver, substituting for Alonso at the season-opener. Magnussen completed a stint at Renault in 2016, before competing with Haas from 2017 until the conclusion of the 2020 season, finishing a career-best ninth in the 2018 World Drivers' Championship. In 2021, Magnussen moved to the IMSA SportsCar Championship with Cadillac, winning the Detroit Classic; he also contested one round of the IndyCar Series with Arrow McLaren, as well as the 24 Hours of Le Mans with High Class.

Magnussen returned to Haas in 2022 to replace Nikita Mazepin, achieving his maiden pole position at the São Paulo Grand Prix. He retained his seat in 2023 and 2024, becoming the first driver since former teammate Romain Grosjean in 2012 to receive a race ban after the latter Italian Grand Prix, before departing at the end of the season. Magnussen achieved one pole position, three fastest laps and one podium finish in Formula One. He holds the Formula One record for the most career starts without leading a lap (185). Magnussen returned to sportscar racing in 2025, joining BMW as a factory driver.

== Early and personal life ==
Kevin Jan Magnussen was born on 5 October 1992 in Roskilde, Denmark. Magnussen is the son of former Formula One driver Jan Magnussen. His cousin Dennis Lind and his half-brother Luca Magnussen are also racing drivers.

Magnussen lived in Woking, Surrey, near the McLaren Technology Centre whilst racing for McLaren. In 2019, Magnussen married Louise Gjørup in a private ceremony. They have two daughters, the first one born in 2021 and the second one born in 2023. He lives in Copenhagen with his family.

== Junior racing career ==
=== Karting ===
Magnussen began his career in karting.

=== Lower formulae ===
In 2008, Magnussen made the step up to Formula Ford in Denmark, taking eleven victories from fifteen races and winning the championship. He also took part in six races of the ADAC Formel Masters series.

Between participating in Formula Ford in 2008 and unexpectedly securing sponsorship for Formula Renault in 2009, Magnussen was forced to abandon his racing career and work as a factory welder due to lack of funding.

In 2009, Magnussen moved up to Formula Renault 2.0 with Motopark Academy. He finished runner-up to António Félix da Costa in the Northern European Cup and finished seventh in the Eurocup.

=== Formula Three ===
In 2010, Magnussen competed in the German Formula Three Championship with Motopark Academy, winning the opening round of the season at Oschersleben and taking two more race victories. He finished third in the championship, taking the rookie title in the process.

In 2011, Magnussen moved to the British Formula 3 Championship with Carlin. He took seven race victories and finished as championship runner-up to teammate Felipe Nasr. He also competed in the Masters of Formula 3 race at Zandvoort, finishing third. 2011 marked Magnussen's first and only appearance at the Macau Grand Prix. He placed seventh in qualifying, but was forced to start from the back of the grid in the qualification race after ignoring yellow flags. He started the main race from nineteenth place, but was eliminated after a high-speed collision late in the race.

=== Formula Renault 3.5 ===
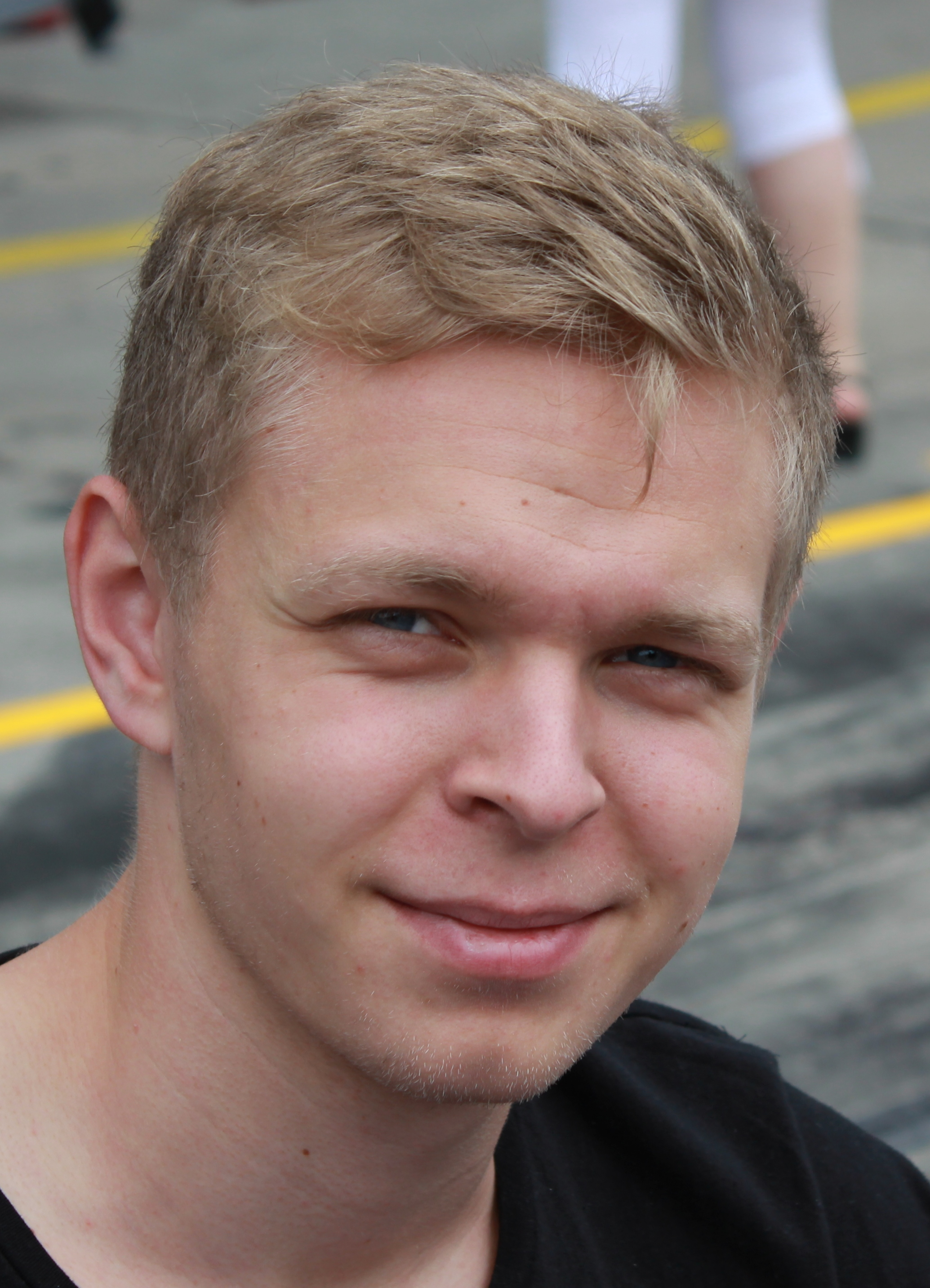
Magnussen in 2012

Magnussen moved up to the Formula Renault 3.5 Series in 2012 with the Carlin team, with Will Stevens as his teammate. Magnussen finished the opening race at Motorland Aragón in second place, and took pole position in both races at Spa-Francorchamps, converting the second into a race victory. He ended the season in seventh place in the championship. He remained in Formula Renault 3.5 for 2013, moving to DAMS alongside Norman Nato. 2013 was far more successful for Magnussen, claiming five victories, eight other podium places and eight pole positions. He finished the season as champion, sixty points clear of runner-up Stoffel Vandoorne.

== Formula One career ==
A member of the McLaren Young Driver Programme from 2010 to 2013, Magnussen had his first experience of the McLaren MP4-27 Formula One car on track at the Abu Dhabi Young Driver test in 2012. He set a quickest time of 1:42.651. Previously he had done work in the team's driving simulator. Magnussen's time was the best of the three-day test impressing McLaren's sporting director Sam Michael. The distance he covered in the course of the test was sufficient to earn his FIA Super Licence.

=== McLaren (2014–2015) ===
==== 2014 ====
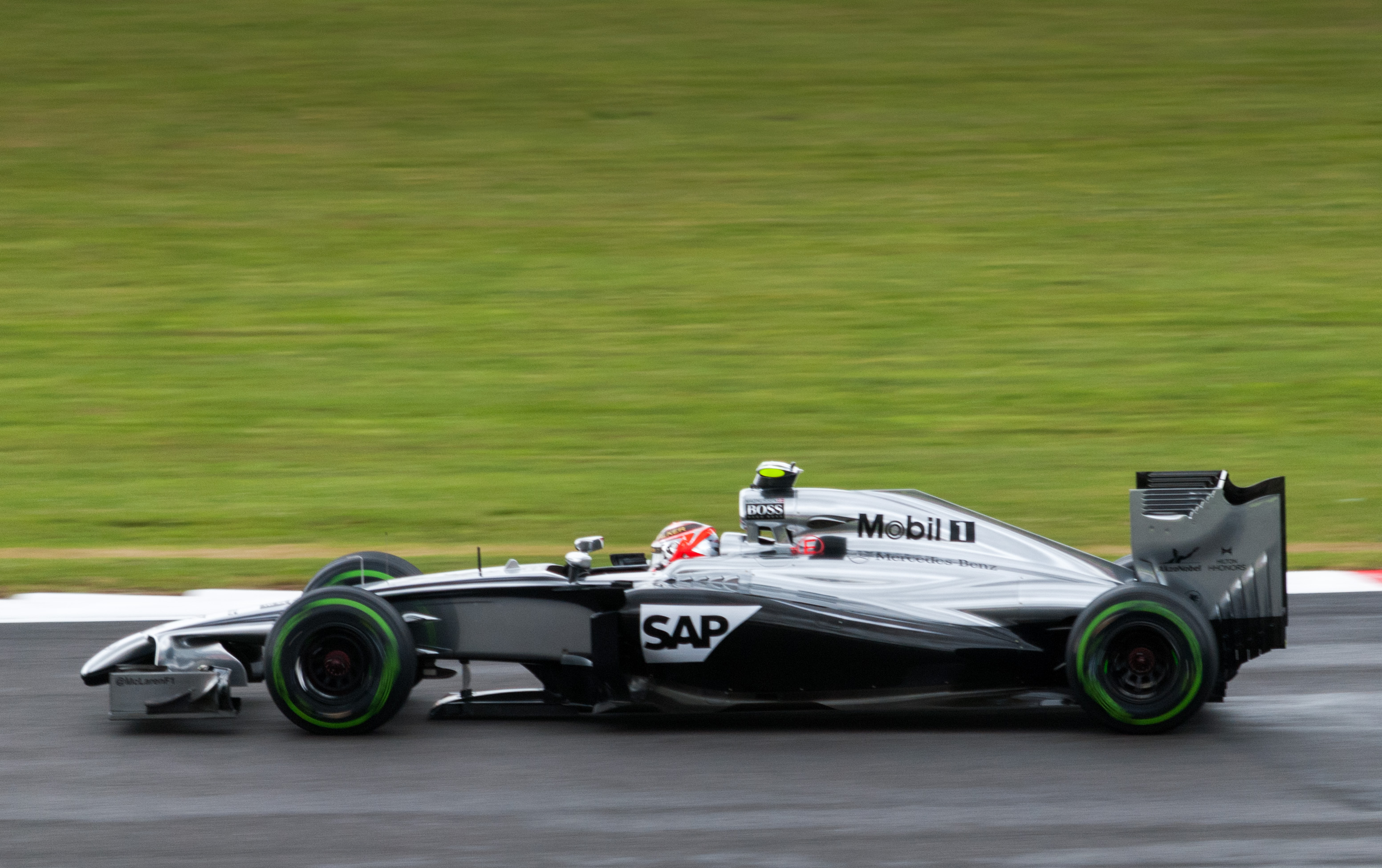
Magnussen at the 2014 British Grand Prix

Magnussen would drive for McLaren for the 2014 season, replacing Sergio Pérez. In line with a new rule introduced for the 2014 season requiring drivers to choose a car number to use during their Formula One career, Magnussen raced with number 20 as this was the number he had on his DAMS car in 2013 when he won the Formula Renault 3.5 championship.

At the Jerez and Bahrain pre-season tests, Magnussen topped the timesheets, and at the first race in Australia, he qualified in fourth position. In the race itself, Magnussen avoided crashing at the start after his car encountered oversteer through wheelspin. After passing Lewis Hamilton's ailing Mercedes in the early stages, Magnussen maintained position to take a third place finish; he finished 2.2 seconds behind Red Bull's Daniel Ricciardo. As a result, Magnussen became the second Danish driver – after his father Jan, who was sixth at the 1998 Canadian Grand Prix – to take a points-scoring finish, the first Danish podium finisher and the first debutant, since Hamilton at the 2007 Australian Grand Prix, to take a podium in his first Grand Prix. After the race, Magnussen described the result as "like a victory". He was later promoted to second place in the results, after Ricciardo was disqualified due to fuel irregularities, making him the first rookie to finish second since Jacques Villeneuve at the 1996 Australian Grand Prix. Magnussen recorded eleven further points-scoring finishes throughout 2014, the majority being ninth or tenth place finishes; although he recorded seventh place finishes in Austria and Great Britain – circuits where he had prior experience from junior formulae – and a fifth place finish in Russia.

==== 2015 ====
Fernando Alonso replaced Magnussen for the 2015 season and Magnussen became the test and reserve driver for McLaren. Magnussen had talks with Honda-powered team Andretti Autosport to compete in the 2015 IndyCar Series, but McLaren blocked the deal. Magnussen competed in one race, the Australian Grand Prix after doctors advised Alonso to not race due to a concussion sustained during an accident during pre-season testing. However, Magnussen failed to start the race after suffering an engine failure on the formation lap. Magnussen was released from McLaren at the end of the year.

=== Renault (2016) ===
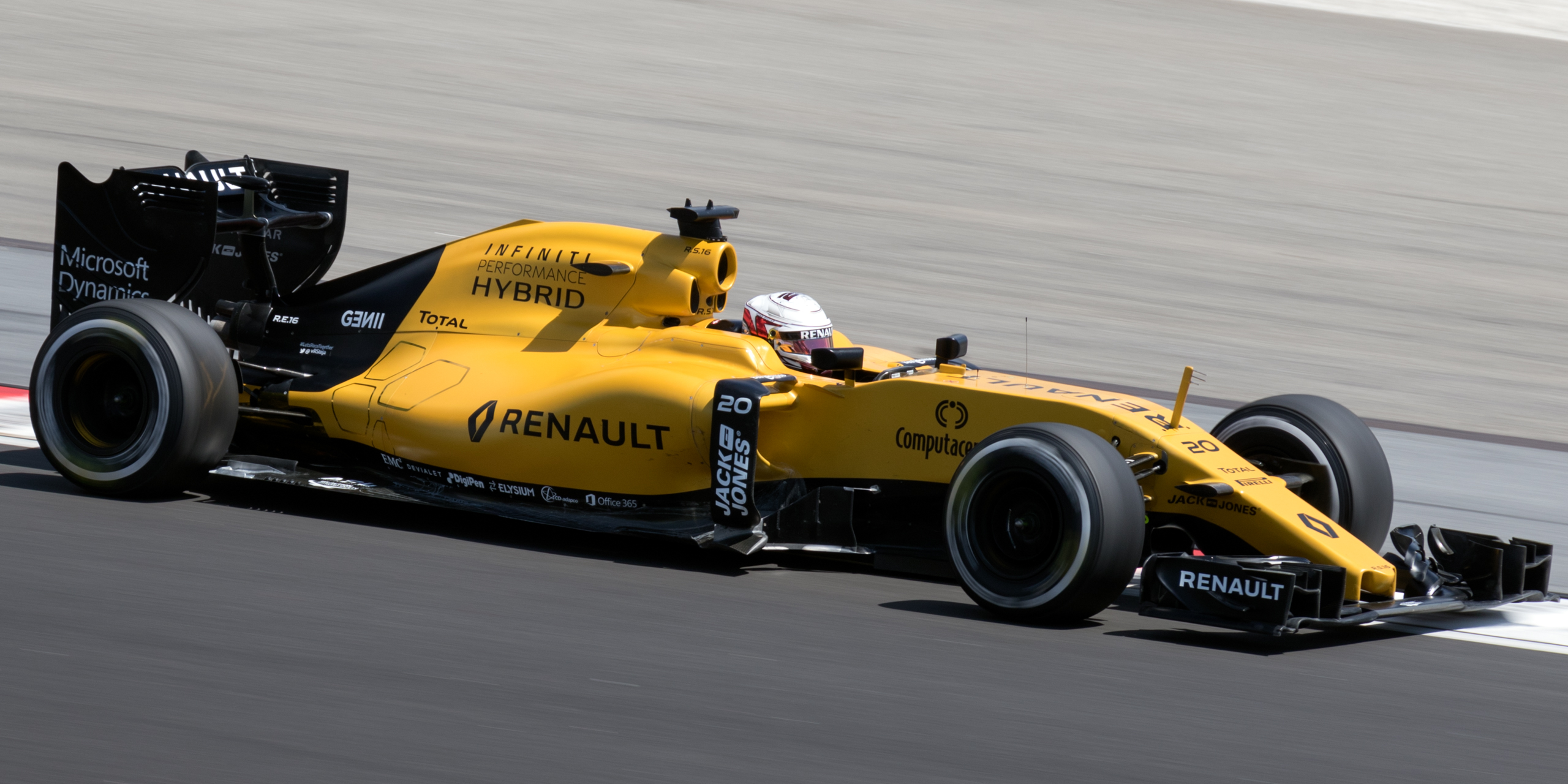
Magnussen at the 2016 Malaysian Grand Prix

After being released by McLaren, Magnussen was confirmed to have been in discussion to drive for the Haas F1 Team, before Romain Grosjean and Esteban Gutiérrez were named as the team's drivers. Magnussen had reportedly also been in talks about a seat at Manor Racing. Magnussen tested a Mercedes DTM car, and Porsche's LMP1 car, hinting that he may have had options outside Formula One, including IndyCar, where he was believed to have entered talks with Bryan Herta Autosport about a drive.

In early 2016, unconfirmed reports emerged that Magnussen was set to replace Pastor Maldonado at Renault following a breach of contract between Maldonado and the team. Renault had purchased the Lotus F1 Team and were returning to the sport after a four-year hiatus. Renault later confirmed Magnussen had joined their 2016 campaign, partnering rookie Jolyon Palmer.

Magnussen's early season was marred by a string of incidents. He suffered a puncture on the opening lap in Australia and went on to finish twelfth. He was forced to start from the pit lane in Bahrain after failing to stop for the weighbridge in practice. He then crashed in practice for the Chinese Grand Prix after a tyre failure and could only finish the race in 17th. Magnussen collided with teammate Palmer in Spain and received a ten-second time penalty, then crashed in practice in Monaco before colliding with Daniil Kvyat in the race. He was forced to miss qualifying in Canada after again crashing during practice, and started from the pit lane in Azerbaijan when his car was modified under parc fermé conditions. The Russian Grand Prix was an exception to these incidents; after qualifying seventeenth he came back to finish seventh in what would eventually be Renault's best finish of the season.

Magnussen had a gearbox failure in the closing laps of the British Grand Prix. He suffered a high-speed crash at the Eau Rouge–Raidillon complex whilst running eighth at the Belgian Grand Prix, causing minor injuries and bringing out the red flag. Magnussen claimed his second and final points-finish of the season with tenth place in Singapore. Two more mechanical retirements came before the end of the season; power loss in Malaysia and suspension damage in Abu Dhabi. Magnussen finished the season in sixteenth place in the championship, scoring seven of Renault's eight points that season.

=== Haas (2017–2020, 2022–2024) ===
==== 2017 ====
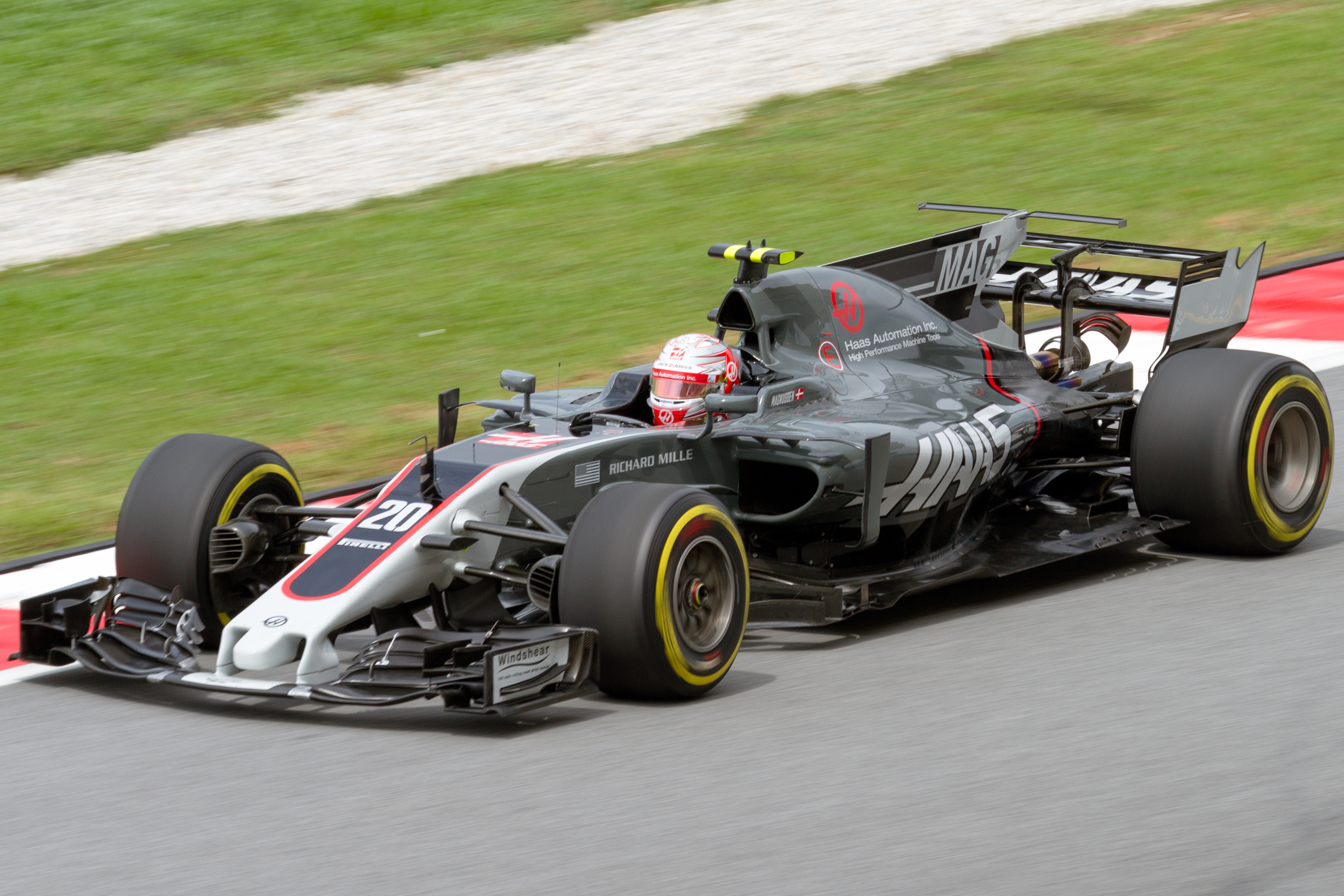
Magnussen driving for Haas at the 2017 Malaysian Grand Prix

Magnussen signed a contract with Haas for 2017, joining Romain Grosjean and replacing Esteban Gutiérrez.

Magnussen retired from his first race with Haas in Australia with reported suspension failure, however it later emerged that he had actually suffered a puncture and that his retirement was unnecessary. He scored points with eighth place at the following race in China before retiring with electrical problems in Bahrain. He was running ninth in Spain but made contact with Daniil Kvyat late in the race, causing him to fall to fourteenth with a puncture. He would claim a point with tenth place at the next race in Monaco, in what was Haas's first ever double points-finish. At the Azerbaijan Grand Prix, Magnussen had run as high as third towards the end of the race in the uncompetitive VF-17, but eventually finished 7th in what would be his best result of the season.

A string of seven races without points followed. This included a hydraulic failure in Austria, engine issues in Singapore, and an incident in Hungary where he forced Nico Hülkenberg off the track, damaging Hülkenberg's car and forcing him to retire. Hülkenberg confronted Magnussen after the race, branding him the "most unsporting driver on the grid" to which Magnussen replied "suck my balls". Magnussen ended the season with two eighth place finishes in Japan and Mexico, but collided with former Formula Renault rival Stoffel Vandoorne in Brazil, causing both cars to retire.

Magnussen ended the season fourteenth in the championship with nineteen points, nine points short of teammate Grosjean.

==== 2018 ====
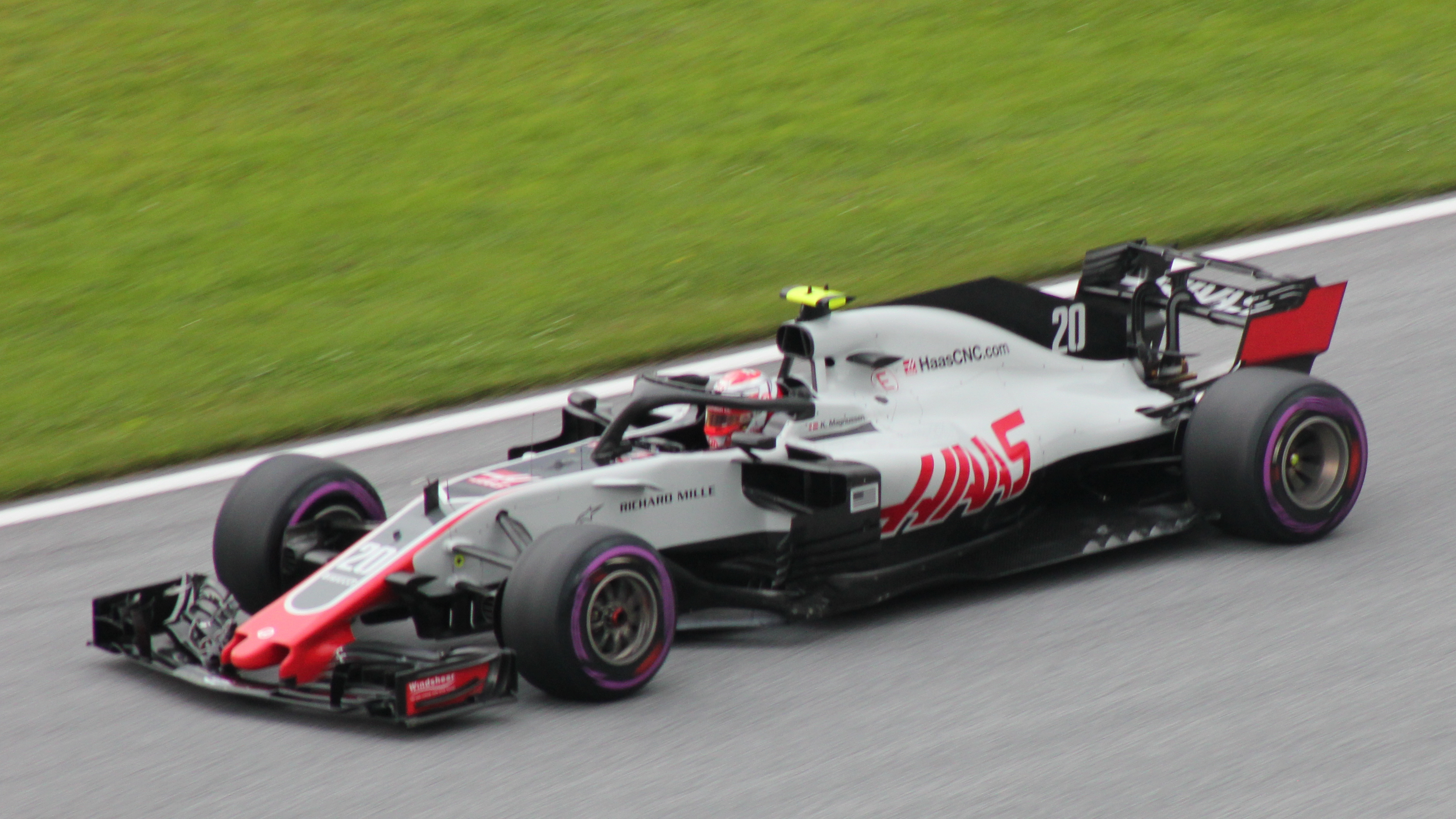
Magnussen at the 2018 Austrian Grand Prix

Magnussen retained his seat at Haas for the 2018 season. The Haas VF-18 was a vast improvement on its predecessor, enabling Magnussen to compete at the front of the midfield. At the opening race in Australia, Magnussen lined up fifth on the grid, Haas's highest ever starting position. He had run as high as fourth, however both Haas cars would retire from the race after their wheels were fitted incorrectly during their pit stops. Magnussen then finished fifth in Bahrain, his best result since the 2014 Russian Grand Prix. At the Azerbaijan Grand Prix he collided with Pierre Gasly, who criticised Magnussen's defensive driving and branded him "the most dangerous guy" he had ever raced with.

Magnussen scored valuable points again with a sixth place finish in Spain. Another sixth place came in France, followed by fifth place in Austria behind teammate Grosjean, the team's best ever race result. More points finishes soon followed with ninth in Britain, seventh in Hungary and eighth in Belgium. At the Italian Grand Prix, Magnussen clashed for position with Fernando Alonso in qualifying. Magnussen later commented that Alonso "thinks he's God" and "I can't wait for him to retire". Magnussen collided with Sergio Pérez during the race, damaging the Haas's floor and eventually causing Magnussen to finish last of the running cars in 16th. Similar woes came in Singapore, when he failed to progress out of the first part of qualifying and he struggled to overtake during the race, finishing eighteenth. However, he set the fastest lap of the race after a late pit stop for fresh tyres, his and the team's first fastest lap. Magnussen then qualified fifth and finished eighth in Russia.

More controversy came at the Japanese Grand Prix, when Sauber driver Charles Leclerc called Magnussen "stupid" over the radio after his attempt to pass the Haas resulted in contact. Magnussen received a puncture, which damaged his floor and forced him into retirement. He finished the United States Grand Prix in ninth place, but was later disqualified after his car was found to have used more than the legal limit of fuel. Magnussen ended the season with two more points finishes, ninth in Brazil and tenth in Abu Dhabi.

Magnussen finished the season ninth in the championship with 56 points, his best ever finish and nineteen points clear of teammate Grosjean.

==== 2019 ====
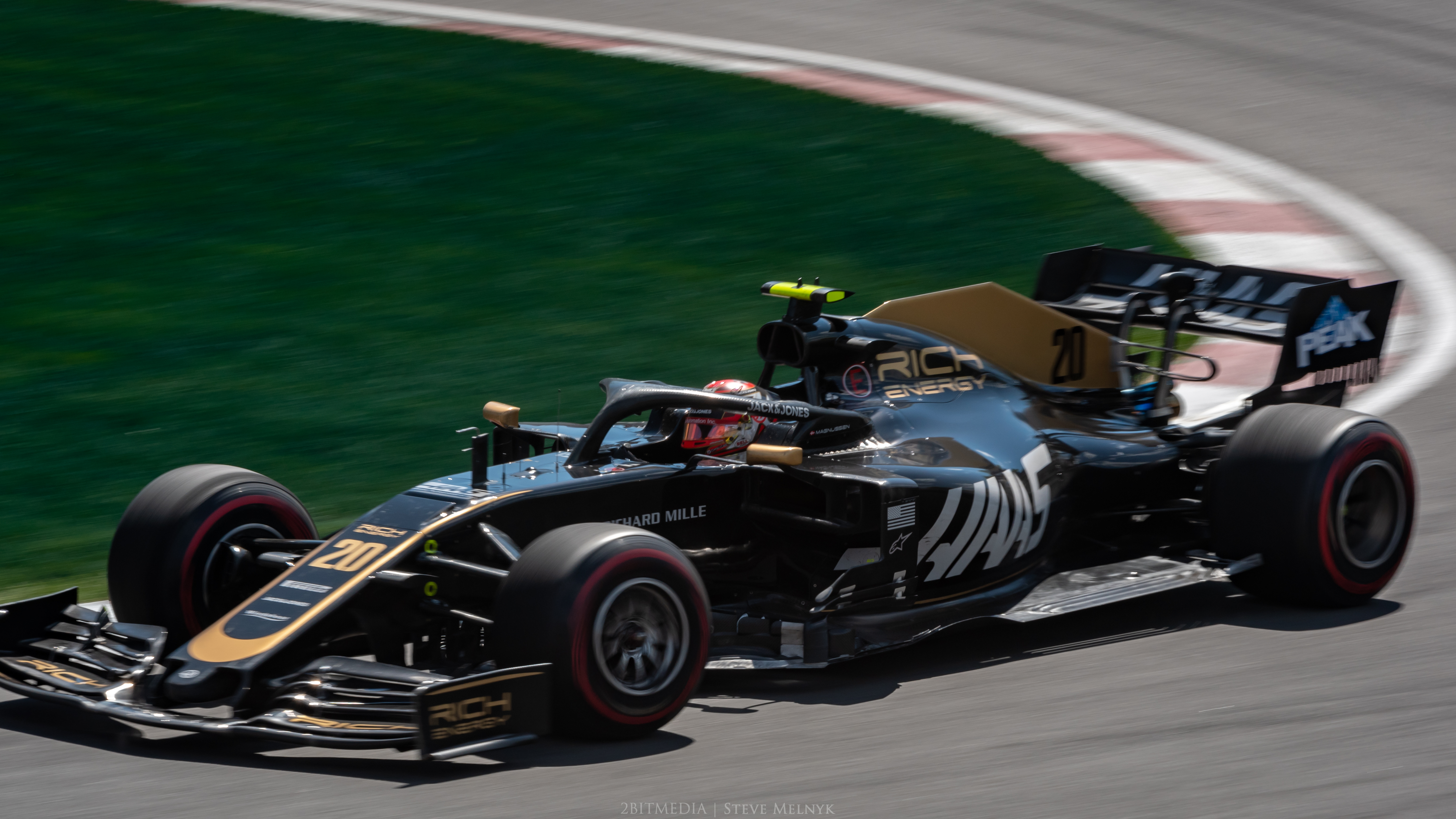
Magnussen at the 2019 Canadian Grand Prix

Magnussen continued to drive for Haas for the 2019 season alongside Grosjean. The Haas VF-19 proved uncompetitive and became more so as the season went on. The car often performed well during qualifying but suffered during the race. At the first race in Australia, Magnussen finished sixth in what would later turn out to be his best finish of the season. He finished thirteenth at the next three races, despite having qualified in the top-ten in two of them. He recorded another points finish in Spain, finishing seventh.

Poor finishes followed at the next five races. In Austria, Magnussen showed the strong qualifying pace of the VF-19 by qualifying in fifth, before a gearbox penalty dropped him to tenth on the grid. During the race, he was found to have over-stepped his grid line at the start, receiving a drive-through penalty and eventually finishing the race in nineteenth place. In Britain, Magnussen and teammate Grosjean made contact on the first lap, causing race-ending damage for both drivers. Both were blamed and criticised for the incident, at a race in which Grosjean was testing the old spec of the VF-19 so that the team could understand their recent lack of pace.

Magnussen next scored points at the rain-affected German Grand Prix, finishing tenth before being promoted to eighth after the Alfa Romeo drivers were penalised post-race for the use of driver aids. He retired in Italy with a hydraulics issue, before setting the fastest lap at the next race in Singapore, a feat he had achieved at the same race in 2018. He was not awarded a point for this as he finished in seventeenth place—a driver must finish in the top ten to be awarded a fastest lap point. A ninth place finish in Russia would be his fourth and final points finish of the season. His third retirement of the season came in the United States when he suffered a brake failure on the penultimate lap.

Magnussen finished the season in sixteenth place in the championship with twenty points, twelve points ahead of teammate Grosjean.

==== 2020 ====
Magnussen continued driving for Haas in 2020, again partnering with Grosjean. The opening two rounds of the championship at the Red Bull Ring proved to be difficult for Magnussen and Haas, as the Haas VF-20 was off the pace. In the early stages of the Hungarian Grand Prix, Magnussen was running third, thanks to a strategy decision at the beginning of the race. Whilst he ultimately fell back throughout the race, he managed to cross the finish line in ninth. After the race, it was determined that Haas had broken rules regarding team radio in telling both drivers to pit at the end of the formation lap, and Magnussen was given a ten-second penalty. This demoted him to tenth, and Magnussen claimed his and Haas' first point of the year. Magnussen suffered a power unit failure at the Italian Grand Prix and was rear-ended in a multi-car accident at the Tuscan Grand Prix, his fifth retirement in nine races.

Magnussen and teammate Grosjean departed the team at the end of the 2020 season, to be replaced with Formula 2 champion Mick Schumacher, as well as Nikita Mazepin for the 2021 World Championship.

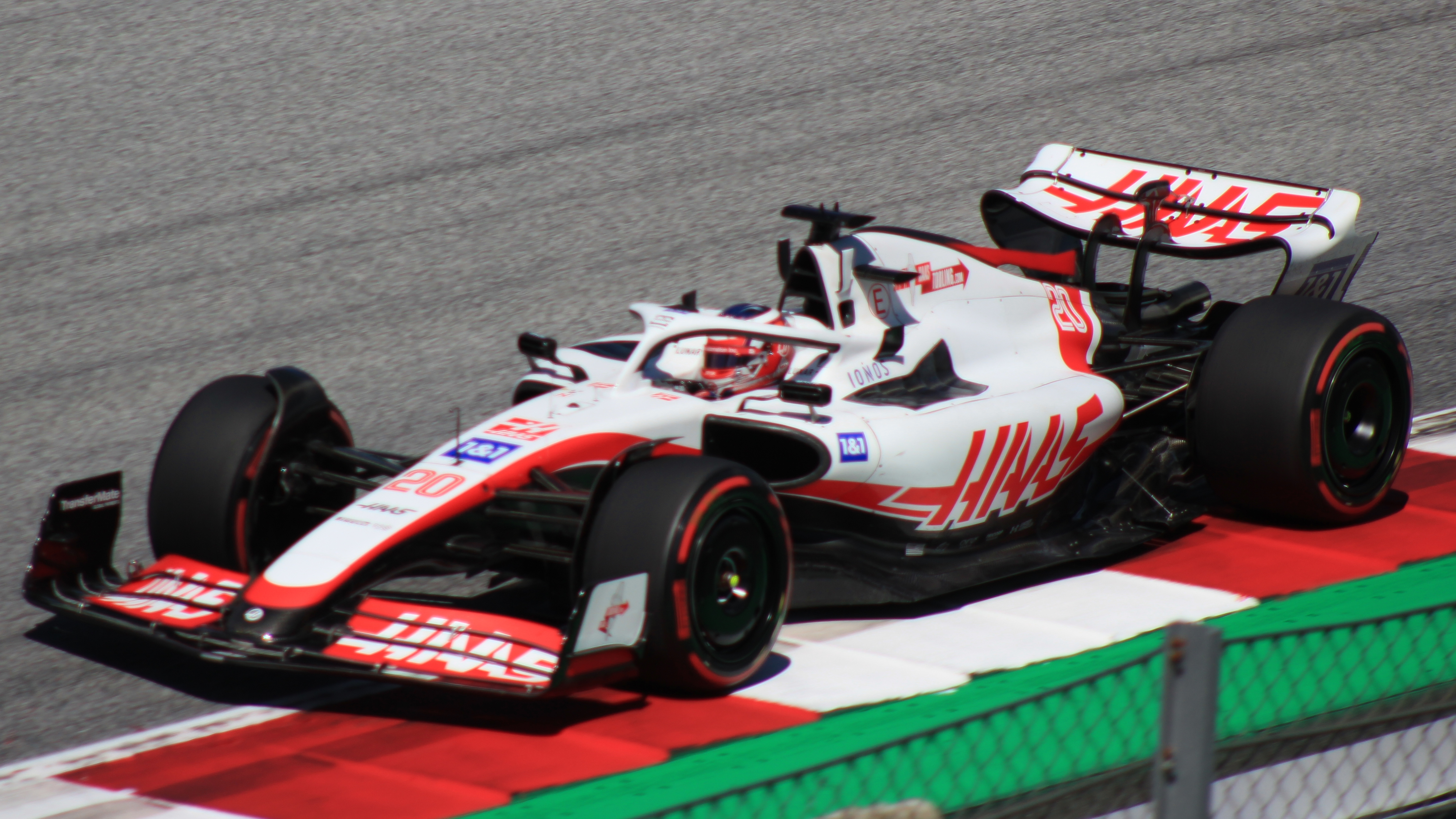
Magnussen at the 2022 Austrian Grand Prix

==== 2022: Return and maiden pole position ====
Following the Russian invasion of Ukraine, Haas terminated its contract with their driver Nikita Mazepin. Magnussen returned to the team as his replacement on a multi-year deal, partnering existing driver Mick Schumacher for the 2022 season. In his return for Haas at Bahrain, Magnussen managed to start seventh and finish fifth, scoring one of only five top five finishes in Haas's history up to that point. In the 2022 Saudi Arabian Grand Prix, he made it into Q3 and qualified tenth. He later turned that into a ninth- place finish, securing Haas consecutive points for the first time since 2019. Magnussen finished tenth at Silverstone with his teammate Schumacher finishing eighth giving Haas a first double-point finish since Germany 2019, and the pair would continue this run by scoring points again in the following round in Austria, despite the Dane experiencing engine issues during the race. At the 2022 São Paulo Grand Prix, Magnussen took his and Haas’ first pole position in Formula One. Magnussen qualified first after George Russell spun at turn four, bringing out a red flag during which track conditions deteriorated meaning no driver could set a faster time than before the crash. Magnussen became just the second driver in F1 history to set a pole for a non-Ferrari team using a Ferrari engine, fourteen years after Sebastian Vettel did so for Toro Rosso at the 2008 Italian Grand Prix. He would ultimately finish the sprint race in eighth position, and would retire from the Grand Prix on the opening lap following a collision with Daniel Ricciardo.

==== 2023 ====
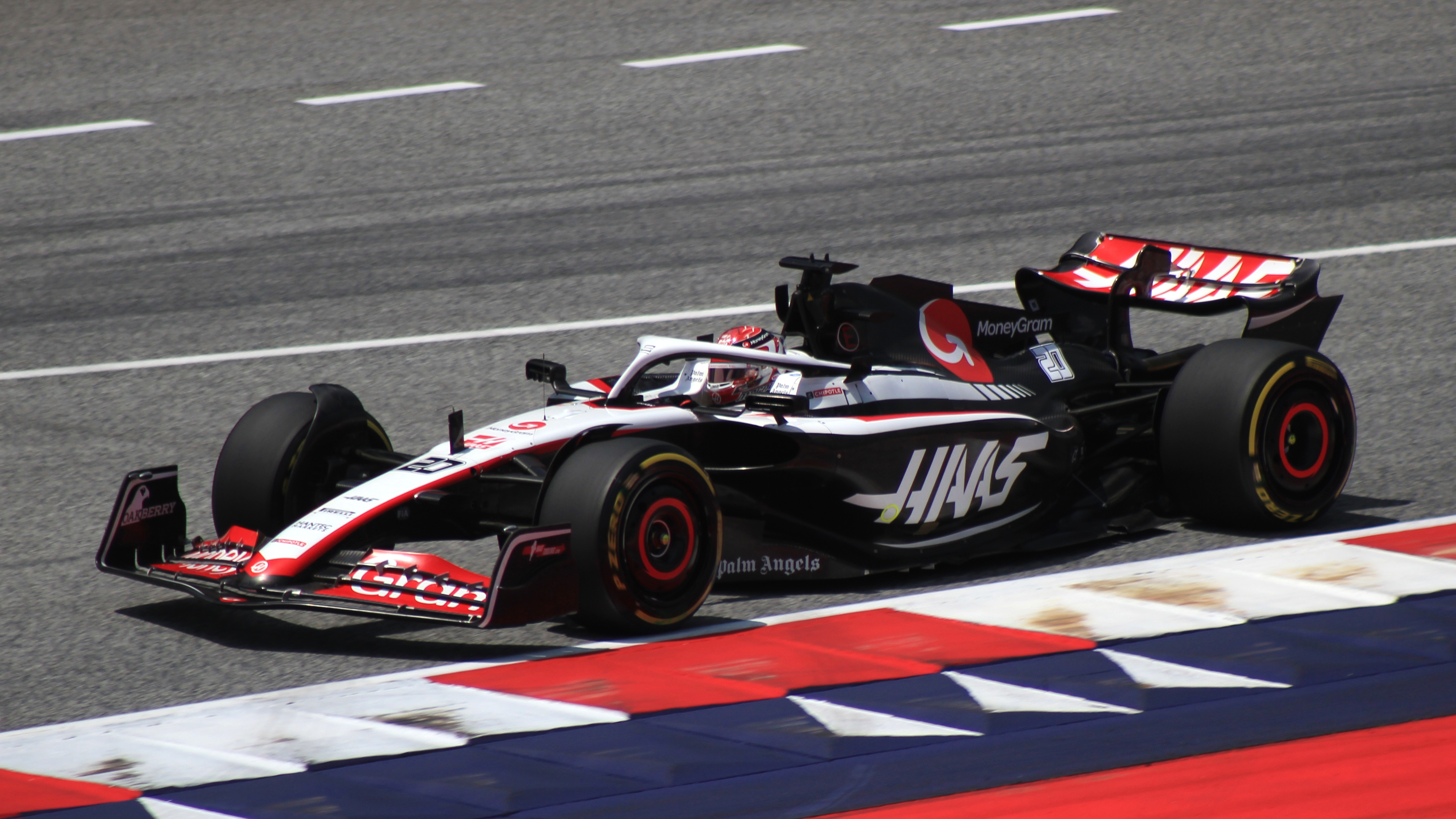
Magnussen at the 2023 Austrian Grand Prix

Magnussen partnered Nico Hülkenberg for the 2023 season. Magnussen struggled with the car, the Haas VF-23, as the car did not perform well with Magnussen's preferred driving style. Additionally, the VF-23 had poor tyre management, causing both drivers to lose time relative to rivals over the course of the race, although this issue was managed better by Hülkenberg. Magnussen struggled with qualifying relative to his teammate, although he qualified strongly at the Miami and Singapore Grands Prix (fourth and sixth respectively), and finished in points paying positions three times over the course of the season, achieving tenth place at the Saudi Arabian, Miami and Singapore Grands Prix, for three points to teammate Hülkenberg's nine. Magnussen summarised the season by stating "There's not been any great highlights [...] there have been races where I've been extremely happy with [tenth], which, you know, just shows what kind of season we've had."

==== 2024: Final season ====
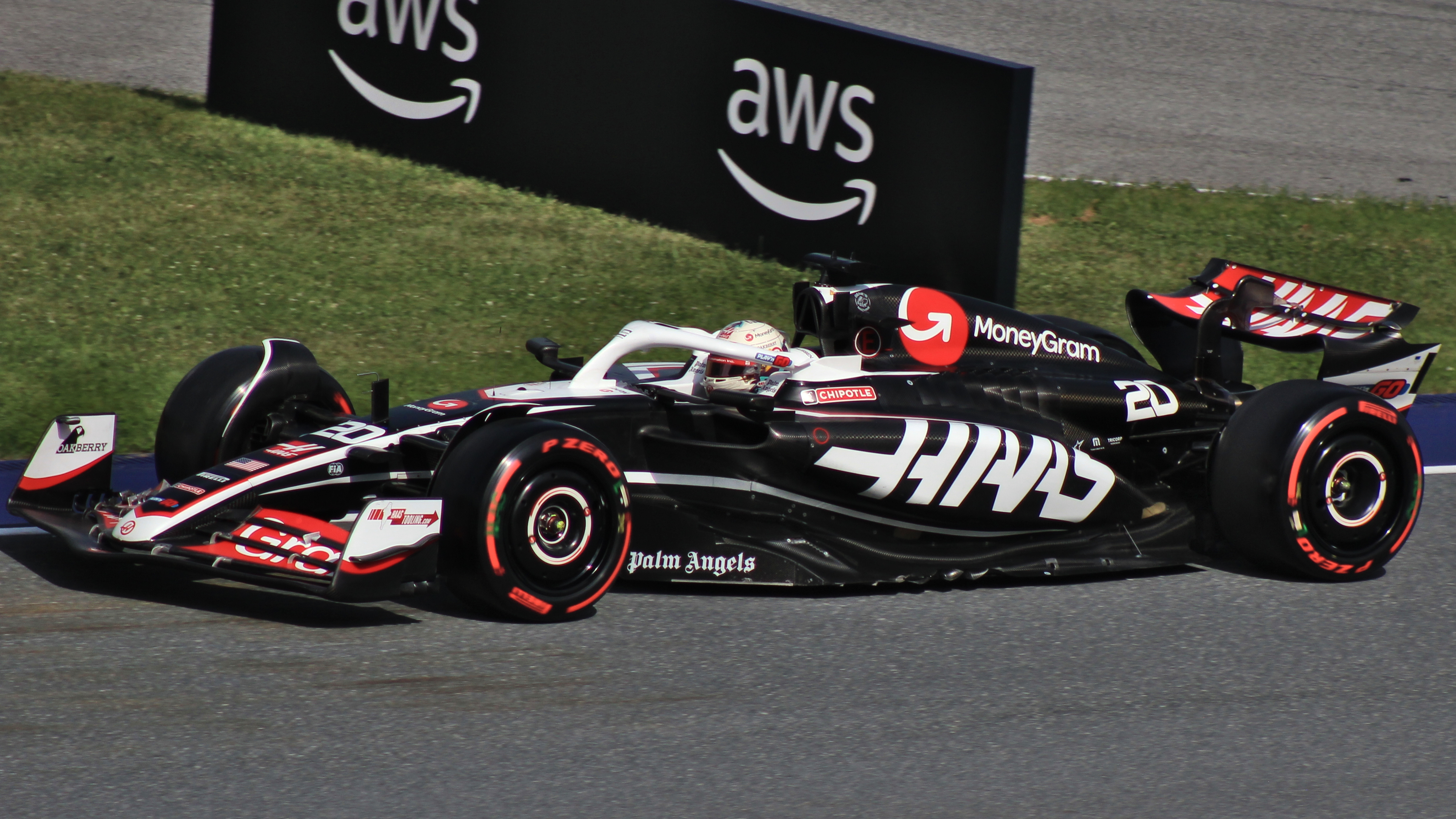
Magnussen at the 2024 Austrian Grand Prix

Magnussen and Hülkenberg were retained by Haas for the 2024 season. Magnussen finished twelfth in the season opener in Bahrain, then finished eleventh in Saudi Arabia, but received two ten-second time penalties. He finished tenth in Australia with Hülkenberg in ninth scoring Haas's first double points finish since the 2022 British Grand Prix. He crashed on the opening lap of the Monaco Grand Prix where he collided with Sergio Pérez; the impact was judged to be a racing incident. He had a great start on the opening lap of the Canadian Grand Prix in fourth place but losing time in the pitstop on lap eight; he finished twelfth behind teammate Hülkenberg who was in eleventh. He finished seventeenth in the Spanish Grand Prix. He finished eighth in the 2024 Austrian Grand Prix and helped guide teammate Hülkenberg to sixth.

Ahead of the Hungarian Grand Prix, Magnussen announced that he would leave the team at the end of the season. Magnussen finished 9th during the Italian Grand Prix, but was given a ten-second time penalty for causing a collision with Pierre Gasly, dropping him to tenth. This also meant that with the accumulation of penalty points in his Super License earning him a one-race ban, Magnussen would be forced to miss the Azerbaijan Grand Prix, with his future replacement Oliver Bearman substituting for him. Magnussen was the first driver since his former teammate Romain Grosjean in 2012 to be banned from a Formula One race. His race ended at the 2024 Singapore Grand Prix when he hit the wall on lap fifty and suffered a right-rear puncture, retiring from the damage. He finished seventh in the Mexico City Grand Prix, his best finish since 2022. Magnussen was unwell ahead of the 2024 São Paulo Grand Prix and was replaced once again by Bearman. Magnussen was originally due to miss only practice and the sprint before taking part in the Grand Prix, but would later have to sit out the entire weekend to allow a full recovery.

=== Test driver roles (2025) ===
In January 2025, Ayao Komatsu confirmed that Magnussen would continue to be linked to Haas that season as part of the team's testing of previous cars programme and as Toyota's simulator driver thanks to the technical partnership that Haas has with the Japanese brand.

== Sportscar racing career ==
=== 2015 ===
Magnussen tested for Porsche in a Porsche 919 Hybrid in November 2015, on Circuit de Barcelona-Catalunya. No contract was made since Magnussen continued in Formula One for Renault in 2016.

=== 2021 ===
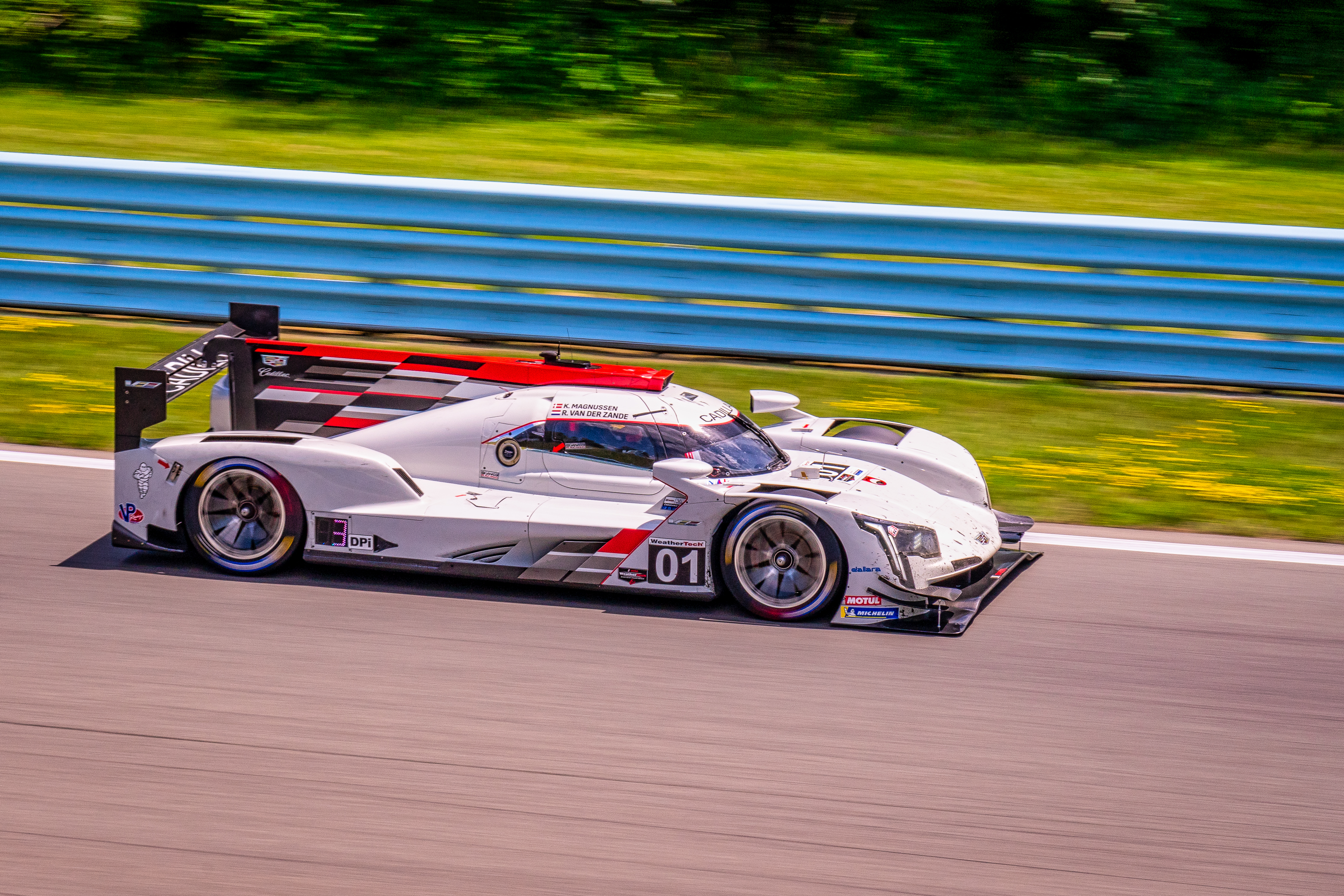
Magnussen driving the No. 01 Cadillac DPi-VR during the 2021 6 Hours of The Glen

Magnussen competed in the WeatherTech SportsCar Championship in 2021, driving the No. 01 Chip Ganassi Racing DPi car alongside Dutch driver Renger van der Zande. On 12 June, he won his first race at the Detroit Grand Prix. Magnussen concluded the season with four straight podium finishes and placed seventh in points.

On 23 April, it was announced that Magnussen would drive the No. 49 High Class Racing LMP2 car with his father Jan Magnussen and Anders Fjordbach in the 2021 24 Hours of Le Mans. He classified 29th in the overall standings and seventeenth in the LMP2 class.

=== 2022 ===
On 8 February 2021, it was announced that Magnussen would be a part of the driver line-up for Peugeot Sport in the 2022 FIA World Endurance Championship season.

Magnussen competed in the WeatherTech SportsCar Championship in 2022, as third driver in the No. 02 Chip Ganassi Racing DPi car alongside Earl Bamber and Alex Lynn, but was released from his contracts with Peugeot and Chip Ganassi Racing after returning to Formula One with Haas in 2022.

Following the Formula One season finale at the 2022 Abu Dhabi Grand Prix, it was confirmed that Magnussen would race alongside his father Jan at the 2022 Gulf 12 Hours at the Yas Marina Circuit, during the final round of the 2022 Intercontinental GT Challenge. Magnussen qualified 15th on the grid for the race and subsequently finished seventh place overall, less than a second behind sixth after a clean race.

=== 2023 ===
Magnussen was confirmed to compete alongside his father in the 2023 24 Hours of Daytona in a new Porsche 911 GT3 R, run by MDK Motorsports, the same team that ran his Ferrari in the Gulf 12 Hours. However, he withdrew from the event a week prior due to necessary hand surgery.

=== 2025 ===
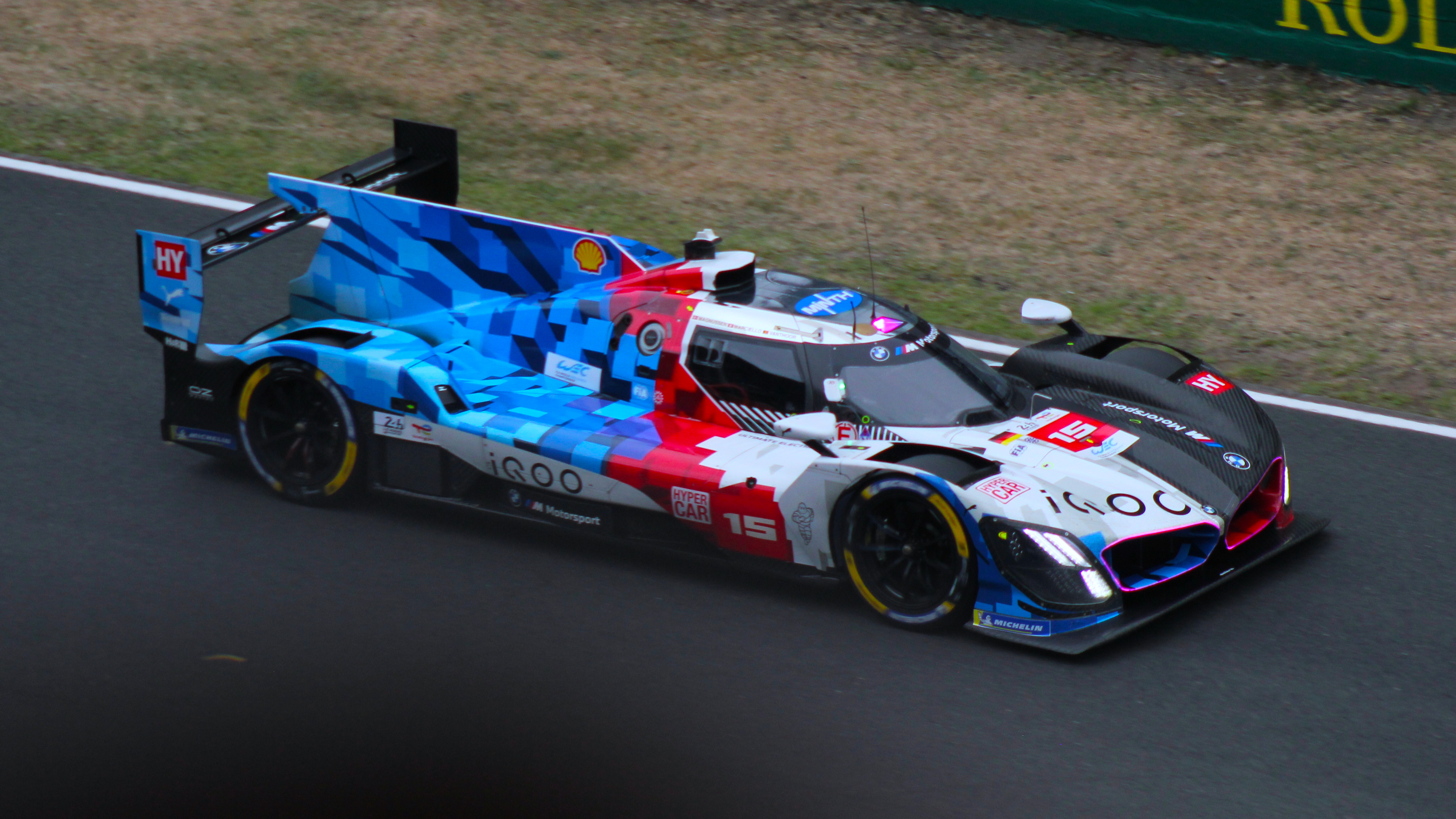
Magnussen's No. 15 BMW M Hybrid V8 at the 2025 24 Hours of Le Mans

In early December 2024, BMW M Motorsport announced Magnussen would become a works driver for their LMDh program. This marked his first WeatherTech Championship appearance since the 2022 Rolex 24 at Daytona. His first race with the team was the Rolex 24 at Daytona, where BMW M Team RLL finished fourth. BMW announced that Magnussen would be racing in the World Endurance Championship (WEC) in 2025.

==== 2026 ====
He started by racing in IMSA's Rolex 24 at Daytona, where his BMW M Team WRT team finished eighth. He also did Sebring, where his team finished tenth. He again competed in WEC, where he and his team won at the 2026 6 Hours of São Paulo.

== IndyCar career ==
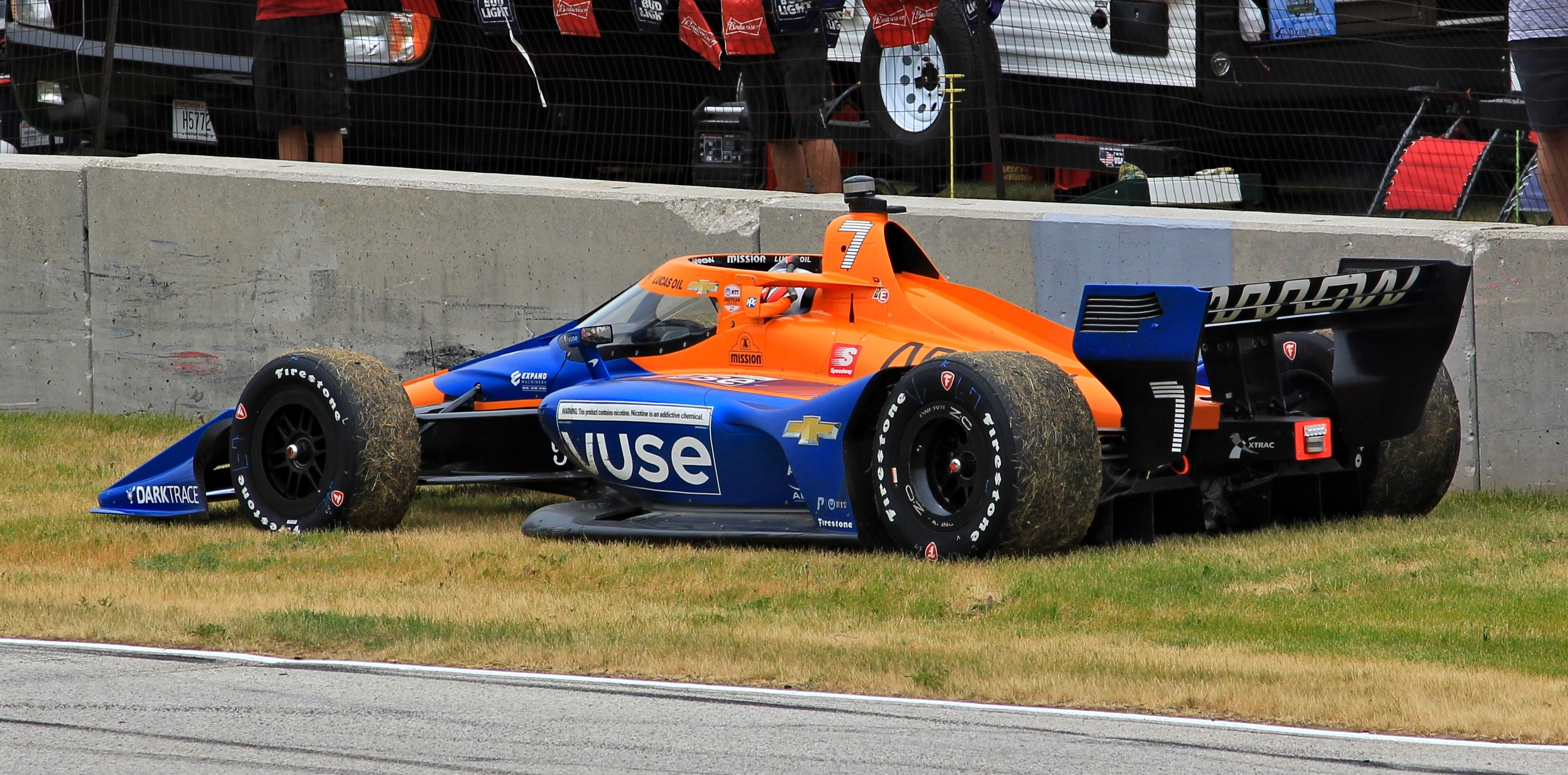
Magnussen retiring from the race at the 2021 Grand Prix of Road America

In June 2021, Magnussen was drafted in by Arrow McLaren SP to fill in for the injured Felix Rosenqvist at the Grand Prix of Road America. He qualified 21st and retired with mechanical issues during the race.

== NASCAR career ==
On 3 June 2026, it was announced that Magnussen would make his debut in the NASCAR Cup Series at the Coronado Street Course, driving the No. 91 Chevrolet for Trackhouse Racing. He finished 27th and had the fastest lap.

== Mentoring ==
Magnussen currently mentors F1 Academy and F4 British Championship driver Alba Larsen. Magnussen started mentoring Larsen around 2023 after Larsen competed with Magnussen's younger brother, Luca Magnussen, who currently competes in the 2025 GB4 Championship.

== Racing record ==
=== Career summary ===
Season	Series	Team	Races	Wins	Poles	F/Laps	Podiums	Points	Position
2008	Danish Formula Ford Championship	Fukamuni Racing	15	11	6	10	12	267	**1st**
2008	Formula Ford Duratec Benelux	Fukamuni Racing	2	0	0	0	0	19	19th
2008	Formula Ford Festival – Duratec Class	Fukamuni Racing	1	0	0	0	0	N/A	7th
2008	Formula Ford NEZ	Fukamuni Racing	1	1	1	1	1	27	4th
2008	ADAC Formel Masters	Van Amersfoort Racing	4	0	0	1	2	30	12th
2008	Formula Renault 2.0 Portugal Winter Series	Motopark Academy	2	0	0	0	1	12	10th
2009	Formula Renault 2.0 NEC	Motopark Academy	14	1	2	4	12	278	**2nd**
2009	Eurocup Formula Renault 2.0	Motopark Academy	14	0	0	1	1	50	7th
2009	Renault Clio Cup Denmark	?	2	0	0	0	1	18	12th
2010	German Formula 3 Championship	Motopark Academy	18	3	0	0	8	96	**3rd**
2010	Formula 3 Euro Series	Motopark Academy	2	1	0	0	1	8	12th
2011	British Formula 3 Championship	Carlin	29	7	6	9	9	237	**2nd**
2011	Masters of Formula 3	Carlin	1	0	0	0	1	N/A	**3rd**
2011	Macau Grand Prix	Carlin	1	0	0	0	0	N/A	14th
2012	Formula Renault 3.5 Series	Carlin	17	1	3	0	3	106	7th
2012	Danish Thundersport Championship	Fukamuni Racing	1	1	0	0	1	0	NC
2013	Formula Renault 3.5 Series	DAMS	17	5	8	3	13	274	**1st**
2014	Formula One	McLaren Mercedes	19	0	0	0	1	55	11th
2015	Formula One	McLaren Honda	1	0	0	0	0	0	NC
2015	Formula One	McLaren Honda	Reserve driver						
2016	Formula One	Renault Sport F1 Team	21	0	0	0	0	7	16th
2017	Formula One	Haas F1 Team	20	0	0	0	0	19	14th
2018	Formula One	Haas F1 Team	21	0	0	1	0	56	9th
2019	Formula One	Haas F1 Team (Note: Haas entered rounds 1–14 as "Rich Energy Haas F1 Team".)	21	0	0	1	0	20	16th
2020	Formula One	Haas F1 Team	17	0	0	0	0	1	20th
2021	IMSA SportsCar Championship - DPI	Cadillac Chip Ganassi Racing	10	1	1	4	5	2879	7th
2021	IndyCar Series	Arrow McLaren SP	1	0	0	0	0	7	42nd
2021	24 Hours of Le Mans - LMP2	High Class Racing	1	0	0	0	0	N/A	17th
2022	Formula One	Haas F1 Team	22	0	1	0	0	25	13th
2022	IMSA SportsCar Championship - DPi	Cadillac Chip Ganassi Racing	1	0	0	0	0	275	23rd
2022	Intercontinental GT Challenge	AF Corse - MDK Motorsports	1	0	0	0	0	8	18th
2023	Formula One	MoneyGram Haas F1 Team	22	0	0	0	0	3	19th
2024	Formula One	MoneyGram Haas F1 Team	23	0	0	1	0	16	15th
2025	FIA World Endurance Championship - Hypercar	BMW M Team WRT	8	0	0	0	0	27	20th
2025	IMSA SportsCar Championship - GTP	BMW M Team RLL	3	0	2	0	0	782	22nd
2025	GT World Challenge Europe Endurance Cup	Team WRT	1	0	0	0	0	0	NC
2025	Formula One	MoneyGram Haas F1 Team	Test driver						
2026	IMSA SportsCar Championship - GTP	BMW M Team WRT	3	0	0	0	0	704	24th
2026	FIA World Endurance Championship - Hypercar	BMW M Team WRT	8	1	1	0	3	85	**3rd**
2026	NASCAR Cup Series	Trackhouse Racing	1	0	0	1	0	11	38th

=== Complete Formula Renault 2.0 NEC results ===
(key) (Races in bold indicate pole position; races in italics indicate fastest lap)

Year	Team	1	2	3	4	5	6	7	8	9	10	11	12	13	14	15	16	Pos	Points
2009	Motopark Academy	ZAN; 1; 3	ZAN; 2; 2	**HOC**; **1**; 3	HOC; 2 Ret	ALA; 1	ALA; 2	OSC; 1; 2	OSC; 2; 3	ASS; 1; 3	ASS; 2; 3	MST; 1; 3	MST; 2; 3	**NÜR**; **1**; 1	NÜR; 2; 5	SPA; 1; 2	SPA; 2; 3	2nd	278

=== Complete Eurocup Formula Renault 2.0 results ===
(key) (Races in bold indicate pole position; races in italics indicate fastest lap)

Year	Team	1	2	3	4	5	6	7	8	9	10	11	12	13	14	Pos	Points
2009	Motopark Academy	CAT; 1 Ret	CAT; 2 Ret	SPA; 1; 5	SPA; 2; 4	HUN; 1; 16	HUN; 2; 21	SIL; 1; 6	SIL; 2; 10	LMS; 1; 7	LMS; 2; 3	NÜR; 1 DSQ	NÜR; 2 DSQ	ALC; 1; 4	ALC; 2; 5	7th	50

=== Complete German Formula Three Championship results ===
(key) (Races in bold indicate pole position; races in italics indicate fastest lap)

Year	Team	1	2	3	4	5	6	7	8	9	10	11	12	13	14	15	16	17	18	Pos	Points
2010	Motopark Academy	OSC1; 1; 1	OSC1; 2; 2	SAC; 1; 5	SAC; 2; 3	HOC; 1; 2	HOC; 2; 5	ASS1; 1; 7	ASS1; 2; 5	NÜR1; 1 Ret	NÜR1; 2; 7	ASS2; 1; 2	ASS2; 2; 4	LAU; 1; 1	LAU; 2; 9	NÜR2; 1; 1	NÜR2; 2; 5	OSC2; 1; 4	OSC2; 2; 3	3rd	96

=== Complete British Formula Three Championship results ===
(key) (Races in bold indicate pole position; races in italics indicate fastest lap)

Year	Team	1	2	3	4	5	6	7	8	9	10	11	12	13	14	15	16	17	18	19	20	21	22	23	24	25	26	27	28	29	30	Pos	Points
2011	Carlin	MNZ; 1; 15	MNZ; 2; 8	MNZ; 3; 6	OUL; 1; 8	**OUL**; **2**; 18	OUL; 3 Ret	SNE; 1; 1	SNE; 2; 8	SNE; 3; 1	BRH; 1; 8	BRH; 2; 11	BRH; 3; 15	**NÜR**; **1**; 1	NÜR; 2; 6	**NÜR**; **3**; 5	**LEC**; **1**; 4	LEC; 2; 4	**LEC**; **3** Ret	SPA; 1; 7	**SPA**; **2**; 1	SPA; 3; 8	ROC; 1; 7	ROC; 2; 5	ROC; 3; 1	DON; 1 Ret	DON; 2; 16	DON; 3; 1	**SIL**; **1**; 1	SIL; 2; 8	**SIL**; **3**; 2	2nd	237

=== Complete Formula Renault 3.5 Series results ===
(key) (Races in bold indicate pole position; races in italics indicate fastest lap)

Year	Team	1	2	3	4	5	6	7	8	9	10	11	12	13	14	15	16	17	Pos	Points
2012	Carlin	ALC; 1; 2	ALC; 2 Ret	MON; 1 Ret	**SPA**; **1**; 21	**SPA**; **2**; 1	NÜR; 1; 5	NÜR; 2; 8	MSC; 1; 16†	MSC; 2; 10	**SIL**; **1** Ret	SIL; 2 Ret	HUN; 1; 2	HUN; 2; 23†	LEC; 1; 6	LEC; 2; 24†	CAT; 1; 5	CAT; 2; 4	7th	106
2013	DAMS	MNZ; 1; 2	MNZ; 2; 2	**ALC**; **1**; 1	ALC; 2; 9	MON; 1; 4	**SPA**; **1**; 1	**SPA**; **2**; 3	MSC; 1; 11	MSC; 2; 2	RBR; 1; 3	RBR; 2; 3	HUN; 1; 2	**HUN**; **2**; 2	**LEC**; **1** DSQ	**LEC**; **2**; 1	**CAT**; **1**; 1	**CAT**; **2**; 1	**1st**	**274**

^{†} Did not finish, but was classified as he had completed more than 90% of the race distance.

=== Complete Formula One results ===
(key) (Races in bold indicate pole position; races in italics indicate fastest lap)

Year	Entrant	Chassis	Engine	1	2	3	4	5	6	7	8	9	10	11	12	13	14	15	16	17	18	19	20	21	22	23	24	WDC	Points
2014	McLaren Mercedes	McLaren MP4-29	Mercedes PU106A 1.6 V6 t	AUS; 2	MAL; 9	BHR; Ret	CHN; 13	ESP; 12	MON; 10	CAN; 9	AUT; 7	GBR; 7	GER; 9	HUN; 12	BEL; 12	ITA; 10	SIN; 10	JPN; 14	RUS; 5	USA; 8	BRA; 9	ABU; 11						11th	55
2015	McLaren Honda	McLaren MP4-30	Honda RA615H 1.6 V6 t	AUS; DNS	MAL	CHN	BHR	ESP	MON	CAN	AUT	GBR	HUN	BEL	ITA	SIN	JPN	RUS	USA	MEX	BRA	ABU						NC	0
2016	Renault Sport F1 Team	Renault R.S.16	Renault R.E.16 1.6 V6 t	AUS; 12	BHR; 11	CHN; 17	RUS; 7	ESP; 15	MON; Ret	CAN; 16	EUR; 14	AUT; 14	GBR; 17^{†}	HUN; 15	GER; 16	BEL; Ret	ITA; 17	SIN; 10	MAL; Ret	JPN; 14	USA; 12	MEX; 17	BRA; 14	ABU; Ret				16th	7
2017	Haas F1 Team	Haas VF-17	Ferrari 062 1.6 V6 t	AUS; Ret	CHN; 8	BHR; Ret	RUS; 13	ESP; 14	MON; 10	CAN; 12	AZE; 7	AUT; Ret	GBR; 12	HUN; 13	BEL; 15	ITA; 11	SIN; Ret	MAL; 12	JPN; 8	USA; 16	MEX; 8	BRA; Ret	ABU; 13					14th	19
2018	Haas F1 Team	Haas VF-18	Ferrari 062 EVO 1.6 V6 t	AUS; Ret	BHR; 5	CHN; 10	AZE; 13	ESP; 6	MON; 13	CAN; 13	FRA; 6	AUT; 5	GBR; 9	GER; 11	HUN; 7	BEL; 8	ITA; 16	SIN; 18	RUS; 8	JPN; Ret	USA; DSQ	MEX; 15	BRA; 9	ABU; 10				9th	56
2019	Haas F1 Team	Haas VF-19	Ferrari 064 1.6 V6 t	AUS; 6	BHR; 13	CHN; 13	AZE; 13	ESP; 7	MON; 14	CAN; 17	FRA; 17	AUT; 19	GBR; Ret	GER; 8	HUN; 13	BEL; 12	ITA; Ret	SIN; 17	RUS; 9	JPN; 15	MEX; 15	USA; 18^{†}	BRA; 11	ABU; 14				16th	20
2020	Haas F1 Team	Haas VF-20	Ferrari 065 1.6 V6 t	AUT; Ret	STY; 12	HUN; 10	GBR; Ret	70A; Ret	ESP; 15	BEL; 17	ITA; Ret	TUS; Ret	RUS; 12	EIF; 13	POR; 16	EMI; Ret	TUR; 17†	BHR; 17	SKH; 15	ABU; 18								20th	1
2022	Haas F1 Team	Haas VF-22	Ferrari 066/7 1.6 V6 t	BHR; 5	SAU; 9	AUS; 14	EMI; 9^{8}	MIA; 16†	ESP; 17	MON; Ret	AZE; Ret	CAN; 17	GBR; 10	AUT; 8^{7}	FRA; Ret	HUN; 16	BEL; 16	NED; 15	ITA; 16	SIN; 12	JPN; 14	USA; 9	MXC; 17	**SAP**; Ret^{8}	ABU; 17			13th	25
2023	MoneyGram Haas F1 Team	Haas VF-23	Ferrari 066/10 1.6 V6 t	BHR; 13	SAU; 10	AUS; 17†	AZE; 13	MIA; 10	MON; 19†	ESP; 18	CAN; 17	AUT; 18	GBR; Ret	HUN; 17	BEL; 15	NED; 16	ITA; 18	SIN; 10	JPN; 15	QAT; 14	USA; 14	MXC; Ret	SAP; Ret	LVG; 13	ABU; 20			19th	3
2024	MoneyGram Haas F1 Team	Haas VF-24	Ferrari 066/10 1.6 V6 t	BHR; 12	SAU; 12	AUS; 10	JPN; 13	CHN; 16	MIA; 19	EMI; 12	MON; Ret	CAN; 12	ESP; 17	AUT; 8	GBR; 12	HUN; 15	BEL; 14	NED; 18	ITA; 10	AZE	SIN; 19†	USA; 11^{7}	MXC; 7	SAP; WD	LVG; 12	QAT; 9	ABU; 16	15th	16

^{†} Did not finish, but was classified as he had completed more than 90% of the race distance.

=== Formula One records ===
Magnussen holds the following Formula One records:

Record		Achieved	Ref
Most points scored on debut	18	2014 Australian Grand Prix	
Most races without leading a lap	185	2023 Qatar Grand Prix	

=== Complete IMSA SportsCar Championship results ===
(key) (Races in bold indicate pole position; races in italics indicate fastest lap)

Year	Entrant	Class	Make	Engine	1	2	3	4	5	6	7	8	9	10	Rank	Points
2021	Cadillac Chip Ganassi Racing	DPi	Cadillac DPi-V.R	Cadillac 5.5 L V8	DAY; 5	SEB; 5	MDO; 5	**DET**; 1	WGL; 6	WGL; 2	ELK; 3	LGA; 2	LBH; 2	PET; WD	7th	2879
2022	Cadillac Racing	DPi	Cadillac DPi-V.R	Cadillac 5.5 L V8	DAY; 6	SEB	LBH	LGA	MDO	DET	WGL	MOS	ELK	PET	23rd	275
2025	BMW M Team RLL	GTP	BMW M Hybrid V8	BMW P66/3 4.0 L Turbo V8	**DAY**; 4	**SEB**; 12	LBH	LGA	DET	WGL	ELK	IMS	PET; 9		22nd	782
2026	BMW M Team WRT	GTP	BMW M Hybrid V8	BMW P66/3 4.0 L turbo V8	DAY; 8	SEB; 10	LBH	LGA	DET	WGL	ELK	IMS	PET; 11		24th	704

=== IndyCar Series ===
Year	Team	No.	Chassis	Engine	1	2	3	4	5	6	7	8	9	10	11	12	13	14	15	16	Rank	Points	Ref
2021	Arrow McLaren SP	7	Dallara DW12	Chevrolet	ALA	STP	TXS	TXS	IMS	INDY	DET	DET	ROA; 24	MOH	NSH	IMS	GTW	POR	LAG	LBH	42nd	7	

=== Complete 24 Hours of Le Mans results ===
Year	Entrant	Co-Drivers	Car	Class	Laps	Pos.	Class Pos.
2021	(Denmark) High Class Racing	(Denmark) Jan Magnussen (Denmark) Anders Fjordbach	Oreca 07-Gibson	LMP2	336	29th	17th
2025	(Germany) BMW M Team WRT	(Switzerland) Raffaele Marciello (Belgium) Dries Vanthoor	BMW M Hybrid V8	Hypercar	361	31st	18th
2026	(Germany) BMW M Team WRT	(Switzerland) Raffaele Marciello (Belgium) Dries Vanthoor	BMW M Hybrid V8	Hypercar	272	DNF	DNF

=== Complete Gulf 12 Hours results ===
Year	Entrant	No.	Co-Drivers	Car	Class	Laps	Pos.	Class Pos.
2022	(United States) AF Corse - MDK Motorsports	43	(Denmark) Jan Magnussen (United States) Mark Kvamme	Ferrari 488 GT3 Evo 2020	Pro	333	7th	5th

=== Complete FIA World Endurance Championship results ===
(key) (Races in bold indicate pole position) (Races in italics indicate fastest lap)

Year	Entrant	Class	Car	Engine	1	2	3	4	5	6	7	8	Rank	Points
2025	BMW M Team WRT	Hypercar	BMW M Hybrid V8	BMW P66/3 4.0 L Turbo V8	QAT; 4	IMO; 6	SPA; 10	LMS; 17	SÃO; 17	COA; 12	FUJ; Ret	BHR; Ret	20th	27
2026	BMW M Team WRT	Hypercar	BMW M Hybrid V8	BMW P66/3 4.0 L Turbo V8	IMO; 7	SPA; 2	**LMS**; Ret	SÃO; 1	COA; 8	FUJ; 3	CAT; 7	MNZ; 5	3rd	85

=== Complete GT World Challenge Europe Endurance Cup results ===
(key) (Races in bold indicate pole position) (Races in italics indicate fastest lap)

Year	Team	Car	Class	1	2	3	4	5	6	7	Pos.	Points
2025	Team WRT	BMW M4 GT3	Pro	LEC	MNZ	SPA; 6H; 13	SPA; 12H; 14	SPA; 24H; 11	NUR	CAT	NC	0

=== Complete 24 Hours of Spa results ===
Year	Team	Co-Drivers	Car	Class	Laps	Pos.	Class Pos.
2025	(Belgium) Team WRT	(Italy) Valentino Rossi (Germany) René Rast	BMW M4 GT3	Pro	548	11th	10th

=== NASCAR ===
(key) (Bold – Pole position awarded by qualifying time. Italics – Pole position earned by points standings or practice time. * – Most laps led.)

==== Cup Series ====
NASCAR Cup Series results
Year	Driver	No.	Make	1	2	3	4	5	6	7	8	9	10	11	12	13	14	15	16	17	18	19	20	21	22	23	24	25	26	27	28	29	30	31	32	33	34	35	36	NCSC	Pts	Ref
2026	Trackhouse Racing	91	Chevy	DAY	ATL	COA	PHO	LVS	DAR	MAR	BRI	KAN	TAL	TEX	GLN	CLT	NSH	MCH	POC	COR; 27	SON	CHI	ATL	NWS	IND	IOW	RCH	NHA	DAY	DAR	GTW	BRI	KAN	LVS	CLT	PHO	TAL	MAR	HOM	38th	11	

== Notes ==
Sporting positions
Preceded by Christian Markussen	Danish Formula Ford Championship; Champion; 2008	Succeeded by Dennis Lind
Preceded by Robin Frijns	Formula Renault 3.5 Series; Champion; 2013	Succeeded by Carlos Sainz Jr.
Awards
Preceded by Charles Leclerc	Lorenzo Bandini Trophy; 2022	Succeeded by Lando Norris
