= 2021 REV Group Grand Prix at Road America =

Ninth race of the 2021 IndyCar Series

(United States) 2021 REV Group Grand Prix at Road America
Race details
9th round of the 2021 IndyCar season
| ← Previous race | Next race → |
- Date: June 20, 2021
- Official name: REV Group Grand Prix at Road America
- Location: Road America, Elkhart Lake, Wisconsin
- Course: Permanent racing facility 4.014 mi / 6.460 km
- Distance: 55 laps 220.55 mi / 354.94 km

Pole position
- Driver: (United States) (United States) Josef Newgarden (Team Penske)
- Time: 01:46.0186

Fastest lap
- Driver: (Spain) (Spain) Álex Palou (Chip Ganassi Racing)
- Time: 01:48.5653 (on lap 43 of 55)

Podium
- First: (Spain) (Spain) Álex Palou (Chip Ganassi Racing)
- Second: (United States) (United States) Colton Herta (Andretti Autosport w/ Curb-Agajanian)
- Third: (Australia) (Australia) Will Power (Team Penske)

The 2021 REV Group Grand Prix at Road America was the ninth race of the 2021 IndyCar Series season. The race was held on Sunday, June 20, 2021, in Elkhart Lake, Wisconsin at Road America, a 4.048 miles (6.515 km) permanent road course. The race went to the scheduled 55 laps to completion. At race's end, Álex Palou, driving for Chip Ganassi Racing, would take advantage of a disaster-stricken Josef Newgarden to win his second career IndyCar Series win and his second of the season. To fill out the podium, Colton Herta, driving for Andretti Autosport with Curb-Agajanian, and Will Power, driving for Team Penske, would finish second and third, respectively.

== Background ==
Road America is a motorsport road course located near Elkhart Lake, Wisconsin on Wisconsin Highway 67. It has hosted races since the 1950s and currently hosts races in the NASCAR Xfinity Series, NTT Indycar Series, NTTWeatherTech SportsCar Championship, SCCA Pirelli World Challenge, ASRA, AMA Superbike series, IndyCar Series, and SCCA Pro Racing's Trans-Am Series.

Numerous driver replacements would occur for the race. Former F1 driver Kevin Magnussen, who would make his IndyCar debut, would replace Felix Rosenqvist, who suffered injuries at the 2021 Chevrolet Detroit Grand Prix. Oliver Askew would also replace an injured Rinus VeeKay, who suffered injuries in a cycling incident.

In addition, NASCAR driver Cody Ware would make his IndyCar debut.

=== Entry list ===
| Key | Meaning |
|---|---|
| R | Rookie |
| W | Past winner |

| No. | Driver | Team | Engine |
|---|---|---|---|
| 2 | (United States) Josef Newgarden W | Team Penske | Chevrolet |
| 3 | (New Zealand) Scott McLaughlin R | Team Penske | Chevrolet |
| 4 | (Canada) Dalton Kellett | A. J. Foyt Enterprises | Chevrolet |
| 5 | (Mexico) Patricio O'Ward | Arrow McLaren SP | Chevrolet |
| 7 | (Denmark) Kevin Magnussen R | Arrow McLaren SP | Chevrolet |
| 8 | (Sweden) Marcus Ericsson | Chip Ganassi Racing | Honda |
| 9 | (New Zealand) Scott Dixon W | Chip Ganassi Racing | Honda |
| 10 | (Spain) Álex Palou | Chip Ganassi Racing | Honda |
| 12 | (Australia) Will Power W | Team Penske | Chevrolet |
| 14 | (France) Sébastien Bourdais W | A. J. Foyt Enterprises | Chevrolet |
| 15 | (United States) Graham Rahal | Rahal Letterman Lanigan Racing | Honda |
| 18 | (United Arab Emirates) Ed Jones | Dale Coyne Racing with Vasser-Sullivan | Honda |
| 20 | (United States) Conor Daly | Ed Carpenter Racing | Chevrolet |
| 21 | (United States) Oliver Askew | Ed Carpenter Racing | Chevrolet |
| 22 | (France) Simon Pagenaud | Team Penske | Chevrolet |
| 26 | (United States) Colton Herta | Andretti Autosport with Curb-Agajanian | Honda |
| 27 | (United States) Alexander Rossi W | Andretti Autosport | Honda |
| 28 | (United States) Ryan Hunter-Reay | Andretti Autosport | Honda |
| 29 | (Canada) James Hinchcliffe | Andretti Steinbrenner Autosport | Honda |
| 30 | (Japan) Takuma Sato | Rahal Letterman Lanigan Racing | Honda |
| 48 | (United States) Jimmie Johnson R | Chip Ganassi Racing | Honda |
| 51 | (France) Romain Grosjean R | Dale Coyne Racing with Rick Ware Racing | Honda |
| 52 | (United States) Cody Ware R | Dale Coyne Racing with Rick Ware Racing | Honda |
| 59 | (United Kingdom) Max Chilton | Carlin | Chevrolet |
| 60 | (United Kingdom) Jack Harvey | Meyer Shank Racing | Honda |

== Practice ==
=== First practice ===
The first practice session was held on Friday, June 18, at 5:00 PM EST. The session would last for 45 minutes. Romain Grosjean, driving for Dale Coyne Racing with Rick Ware Racing, would set the fastest time in the session, setting a time of 1:47.6781.

| Pos | No. | Driver | Team | Engine | Lap Time |
|---|---|---|---|---|---|
| 1 | 51 | (France) Romain Grosjean R | Dale Coyne Racing with Rick Ware Racing | Honda | 01:47.6781 |
| 2 | 26 | (United States) Colton Herta | Andretti Autosport with Curb-Agajanian | Honda | 01:45.4730 |
| 3 | 2 | (United States) Josef Newgarden W | Team Penske | Chevrolet | 01:47.8417 |
Full first practice results

=== Second practice ===
The second practice session was held on Saturday, June 19, at 11:10 AM EST. The session would last for 45 minutes. Josef Newgarden, driving for Team Penske, would set the fastest time in the session, setting a time of 1:45.3399.

| Pos | No. | Driver | Team | Engine | Lap Time |
|---|---|---|---|---|---|
| 1 | 2 | (United States) Josef Newgarden W | Team Penske | Chevrolet | 01:45.3399 |
| 2 | 28 | (United States) Colton Herta | Andretti Autosport with Curb-Agajanian | Honda | 01:45.4730 |
| 3 | 15 | (United States) Graham Rahal | Rahal Letterman Lanigan Racing | Honda | 01:45.6515 |
Full second practice results

=== Third and final practice ===
The final practice session was held on Saturday, June 19, at 5:30 PM EST. The session would last for 30 minutes. Colton Herta, driving for Andretti Autosport with Curb-Agajanian, would set the fastest time in the session, setting a time of 1:47.6312.

| Pos | No. | Driver | Team | Engine | Lap Time |
|---|---|---|---|---|---|
| 1 | 28 | (United States) Colton Herta | Andretti Autosport with Curb-Agajanian | Honda | 01:47.6312 |
| 2 | 9 | (New Zealand) Scott Dixon W | Chip Ganassi Racing | Honda | 01:47.6457 |
| 3 | 15 | (United States) Graham Rahal | Rahal Letterman Lanigan Racing | Honda | 01:47.6707 |
Full final practice results

== Qualifying ==
Qualifying was held on Saturday, June 19, at 2:30 PM EST. The qualifying format was a three-round knockout elimination format. For round one, the field is divided into two groups based on the odd and even positions of drivers in the final pre-qualifying practice session. The fastest driver in that session decides which group the odd-positioned drivers will be in with the even-positioned drivers in the other group. The fastest six drivers from each group would move onto round 2. Then, the fastest six drivers in round 2 would move onto to the third round, also known as the Firestone Fast Six. The fastest driver in Round 3 would win the pole.

Josef Newgarden, driving for Team Penske would win the pole after advancing from both preliminary rounds and setting the fastest lap in Round 3, setting a time of 1:46.0186 in the third round.

=== Full qualifying results ===
| Pos | No. | Driver | Team | Engine | Time | | | | Final grid |
| Pos | No. | Driver | Team | Engine | Round 1 | | Round 2 | Round 3 | Final grid |
| Pos | No. | Driver | Team | Engine | Group 1 | Group 2 | Round 2 | Round 3 | Final grid |
|---|---|---|---|---|---|---|---|---|---|
| 1 | 2 | (United States) Josef Newgarden W | Team Penske | Chevrolet | N/A | 01:45.6078 | 01:45.6818 | 01:46.0186 | 1 |
| 2 | 26 | (United States) Colton Herta | Andretti Autosport with Curb-Agajanian | Honda | 01:45.7504 | N/A | 01:45.5231 | 01:46.2616 | 2 |
| 3 | 60 | (United Kingdom) Jack Harvey | Meyer Shank Racing | Honda | N/A | 01:46.0061 | 01:45.3612 | 01:46.7206 | 3 |
| 4 | 12 | (Australia) Will Power W | Team Penske | Chevrolet | N/A | 01:45.6716 | 01:45.8570 | 01:46.8237 | 4 |
| 5 | 10 | (Spain) Álex Palou | Chip Ganassi Racing | Honda | 01:45.8821 | N/A | 01:45.8363 | 01:46.8633 | 5 |
| 6 | 22 | (France) Simon Pagenaud | Team Penske | Chevrolet | 01:46:1281 | N/A | 01:45.7996 | 01:47.1274 | 6 |
| 7 | 51 | (France) Romain Grosjean R | Dale Coyne Racing with Rick Ware Racing | Honda | 01:46.1329 | N/A | 01:45.9015 | N/A | 7 |
| 8 | 28 | (United States) Ryan Hunter-Reay | Andretti Autosport | Honda | 01:46:3086 | N/A | 01:45.9514 | N/A | 8 |
| 9 | 27 | (United States) Alexander Rossi W | Andretti Autosport | Honda | N/A | 01:45.6286 | 01:46.1037 | N/A | 9 |
| 10 | 5 | (Mexico) Patricio O'Ward | Arrow McLaren SP | Chevrolet | N/A | 01:45.7681 | 01:46.1069 | N/A | 10 |
| 11 | 14 | (France) Sébastien Bourdais W | A. J. Foyt Enterprises | Chevrolet | 01:46.1085 | N/A | 01:46.2225 | N/A | 11 |
| 12 | 18 | (United Arab Emirates) Ed Jones | Dale Coyne Racing with Vasser-Sullivan | Honda | N/A | 01:45:7968 | 01:46.2270 | N/A | 12 |
| 13 | 9 | (New Zealand) Scott Dixon W | Chip Ganassi Racing | Honda | 01:46.3427 | N/A | N/A | N/A | 13 |
| 14 | 15 | (United States) Graham Rahal | Rahal Letterman Lanigan Racing | Honda | N/A | 01:46.2779 | N/A | N/A | 14 |
| 15 | 20 | (United States) Conor Daly | Ed Carpenter Racing | Chevrolet | 01:46.3976 | N/A | N/A | N/A | 15 |
| 16 | 21 | (United States) Oliver Askew | Ed Carpenter Racing | Chevrolet | N/A | 01:46.2902 | N/A | N/A | 16 |
| 17 | 3 | (New Zealand) Scott McLaughlin R | Team Penske | Chevrolet | 01:46.8624 | N/A | N/A | N/A | 17 |
| 18 | 8 | (Sweden) Marcus Ericsson | Chip Ganassi Racing | Honda | N/A | 01:46.4069 | N/A | N/A | 18 |
| 19 | 29 | (Canada) James Hinchcliffe | Andretti Steinbrenner Autosport | Honda | 01:47.0294 | N/A | N/A | N/A | 19 |
| 20 | 30 | (Japan) Takuma Sato | Rahal Letterman Lanigan Racing | Honda | N/A | 01:46.5130 | N/A | N/A | 20 |
| 21 | 7 | (Denmark) Kevin Magnussen R | Arrow McLaren SP | Chevrolet | 01:47.3776 | N/A | N/A | N/A | 21 |
| 22 | 59 | (United Kingdom) Max Chilton | Carlin | Chevrolet | N/A | 01:46.5551 | N/A | N/A | 22 |
| 23 | 48 | (United States) Jimmie Johnson R | Chip Ganassi Racing | Honda | 01:47.7886 | N/A | N/A | N/A | 23 |
| 24 | 4 | (Canada) Dalton Kellett | A. J. Foyt Enterprises | Chevrolet | N/A | 01:46.9786 | N/A | N/A | 24 |
| 25 | 52 | (United States) Cody Ware R | Dale Coyne Racing with Rick Ware Racing | Honda | N/A | 01:47.7324 | N/A | N/A | 25 |
Full first group qualifying results
Full second group qualifying results
Full second round qualifying results
Full Fast Six qualifying results

== Race results ==
| Pos | No. | Driver | Team | Engine | Laps | Time/Retired | Pit Stops | Grid | Laps Led | Pts. |
|---|---|---|---|---|---|---|---|---|---|---|
| 1 | 10 | (Spain) Álex Palou | Chip Ganassi Racing | Honda | 55 | 1:50:55.0534 | 3 | 5 | 5 | 51 |
| 2 | 26 | (United States) Colton Herta | Andretti Autosport with Curb-Agajanian | Honda | 55 | +1.8926 | 3 | 2 | | 40 |
| 3 | 12 | (Australia) Will Power W | Team Penske | Chevrolet | 55 | +2.9853 | 3 | 4 | | 35 |
| 4 | 9 | (New Zealand) Scott Dixon W | Chip Ganassi Racing | Honda | 55 | +3.9048 | 3 | 13 | 1 | 33 |
| 5 | 51 | (France) Romain Grosjean R | Dale Coyne Racing with Rick Ware Racing | Honda | 55 | +4.7136 | 3 | 7 | | 30 |
| 6 | 8 | (Sweden) Marcus Ericsson | Chip Ganassi Racing | Honda | 55 | +5.1806 | 3 | 18 | | 28 |
| 7 | 27 | (United States) Alexander Rossi W | Andretti Autosport | Honda | 55 | +7.7219 | 3 | 9 | | 26 |
| 8 | 30 | (Japan) Takuma Sato | Rahal Letterman Lanigan Racing | Honda | 55 | +7.9145 | 4 | 20 | 2 | 25 |
| 9 | 5 | (Mexico) Patricio O'Ward | Arrow McLaren SP | Chevrolet | 55 | +9.0243 | 3 | 10 | | 22 |
| 10 | 59 | (United Kingdom) Max Chilton | Carlin | Chevrolet | 55 | +9.3733 | 4 | 22 | 7 | 21 |
| 11 | 15 | (United States) Graham Rahal | Rahal Letterman Lanigan Racing | Honda | 55 | +9.8027 | 3 | 14 | | 19 |
| 12 | 21 | (United States) Oliver Askew | Ed Carpenter Racing | Chevrolet | 55 | +11.3019 | 4 | 16 | 2 | 19 |
| 13 | 28 | (United States) Ryan Hunter-Reay | Andretti Autosport | Honda | 55 | +11.9378 | 3 | 8 | | 17 |
| 14 | 3 | (New Zealand) Scott McLaughlin R | Team Penske | Chevrolet | 55 | +12.1930 | 3 | 17 | | 16 |
| 15 | 29 | (Canada) James Hinchcliffe | Andretti Steinbrenner Autosport | Honda | 55 | +13.9479 | 3 | 19 | | 15 |
| 16 | 14 | (France) Sébastien Bourdais W | A. J. Foyt Enterprises | Chevrolet | 55 | +14.1169 | 4 | 11 | | 14 |
| 17 | 60 | (United Kingdom) Jack Harvey | Meyer Shank Racing | Honda | 55 | +15.5945 | 3 | 3 | | 13 |
| 18 | 22 | (France) Simon Pagenaud | Team Penske | Chevrolet | 55 | +16.4614 | 4 | 6 | | 12 |
| 19 | 52 | (United States) Cody Ware R | Dale Coyne Racing with Rick Ware Racing | Honda | 55 | +16.9933 | 3 | 25 | | 11 |
| 20 | 20 | (United States) Conor Daly | Ed Carpenter Racing | Chevrolet | 55 | +17.5558 | 3 | 15 | | 10 |
| 21 | 2 | (United States) Josef Newgarden W | Team Penske | Chevrolet | 55 | +1:30.7894 | 3 | 1 | 32 | 13 |
| 22 | 48 | (United States) Jimmie Johnson R | Chip Ganassi Racing | Honda | 54 | +1 Laps | 4 | 23 | | 8 |
| 23 | 18 | (United Arab Emirates) Ed Jones | Dale Coyne Racing with Vasser-Sullivan | Honda | 50 | Off Course | 3 | 12 | | 7 |
| 24 | 7 | (Denmark) Kevin Magnussen R | Arrow McLaren SP | Chevrolet | 33 | Off Course | 3 | 21 | 6 | 7 |
| 25 | 4 | (Canada) Dalton Kellett | A. J. Foyt Enterprises | Chevrolet | 19 | Mechanical | 2 | 24 | | 5 |
Fastest lap: (Spain) Álex Palou (Chip Ganassi Racing) – 01:48.5653 (lap 43)
Official race results

== Standings after the race ==
Drivers' Championship standings

| Pos. | Driver | Points |
|---|---|---|
| 1 | (Spain) Álex Palou | 349 |
| 2 | (Mexico) Patricio O'Ward | 321 |
| 3 | (New Zealand) Scott Dixon | 296 |
| 4 | (United States) Josef Newgarden | 261 |
| 5 | (France) Simon Pagenaud | 255 |
Official driver's standings

Engine manufacturer standings

| Pos. | Manufacturer | Points |
|---|---|---|
| 1 | Honda | 738 |
| 2 | Chevrolet | 710 |
Official engine manufacturers' standings

Note: Only the top five positions are included.

| Previous race: 2021 Chevrolet Detroit Grand Prix | IndyCar Series; 2021 season | Next race: 2021 Honda Indy 200 |
| Previous race: 2020 REV Group Grand Prix | Grand Prix of Road America | Next race: 2022 Sonsio Grand Prix at Road America |
