= 2021 Chevrolet Detroit Grand Prix =

Seventh round of the 2021 IndyCar Series

(United States) 2021 Chevrolet Detroit Grand Prix
Race details
7th and 8th round of the 2021 IndyCar season
← Previous race	Next race →
- Date: June 12, 2021
- Official name: Chevrolet Detroit Grand Prix Presented by Lear Corporation
- Location: The Raceway on Belle Isle, Detroit, Michigan
- Course: Temporary street circuit 2.350 mi / 3.782 km
- Distance: 70 laps 164.500 mi / 264.737 km
Race 1

Pole position
- Driver: (Mexico) Patricio O'Ward (Arrow McLaren SP)
- Time: 01:15.5776

Fastest lap
- Driver: (United States) Josef Newgarden (Team Penske)
- Time: 76.6433 (on lap 2 of 70)

Podium
- First: (Sweden) Marcus Ericsson (Chip Ganassi Racing)
- Second: (Netherlands) Rinus VeeKay (Ed Carpenter Racing)
- Third: (Mexico) Pato O'Ward (Arrow McLaren SP)
Race 2

Pole position
- Driver: (United States) Josef Newgarden (Team Penske)
- Time: 01:14.1094

Fastest lap
- Driver: (United States) Colton Herta (Andretti Autosport)
- Time: 76.3434 (on lap 50 of 70)

Podium
- First: (Mexico) Pato O'Ward (Arrow McLaren SP)
- Second: (United States) Josef Newgarden (Team Penske)
- Third: (Spain) Álex Palou (Chip Ganassi Racing)

The 2021 Chevrolet Detroit Grand Prix (officially known as the 2021 Chevrolet Indy Detroit Grand Prix presented by Lear Corporation) was a pair of IndyCar motor races held on June 12, 2021, and June 13, 2021 at The Raceway at Belle Isle Park in Detroit, Michigan. They were the seventh and eighth races of the 2021 IndyCar Series.

Marcus Ericsson won the first race for Chip Ganassi Racing, scoring his first career victory in his third season, becoming the 7th different winner in the first 7 races. Ed Carpenter Racing's Rinus VeeKay finished second, with Pato O'Ward rounding out the podium places in third.

Pato O'Ward won the second race for Arrow McLaren SP, his second victory of the season, and his career. Team Penske's Josef Newgarden finished second, with Álex Palou rounding out the podium places in third.

== Race 1 – Saturday June, 12 ==
=== Entrants ===
25 drivers entered the race, including IndyCar Series debutants Jimmie Johnson (Chip Ganassi Racing) and Romain Grosjean (Dale Coyne Racing with Rick Ware Racing), with Scott McLaughlin (Team Penske).

Key	Meaning
**R**	Rookie
**W**	Past winner

No.	Driver	Team	Engine
2	(United States) Josef Newgarden **W**	Team Penske	Chevrolet
3	(New Zealand) Scott McLaughlin **R**	Team Penske	Chevrolet
4	(Canada) Dalton Kellett	A. J. Foyt Enterprises	Chevrolet
5	(Mexico) Pato O'Ward	Arrow McLaren SP	Chevrolet
7	(Sweden) Felix Rosenqvist	Arrow McLaren SP	Chevrolet
8	(Sweden) Marcus Ericsson	Chip Ganassi Racing	Honda
9	(New Zealand) Scott Dixon **W**	Chip Ganassi Racing	Honda
10	(Spain) Álex Palou	Chip Ganassi Racing	Honda
12	(Australia) Will Power **W**	Team Penske	Chevrolet
14	(France) Sébastien Bourdais **W**	A. J. Foyt Enterprises	Chevrolet
15	(United States) Graham Rahal **W**	Rahal Letterman Lanigan Racing	Honda
18	(United Arab Emirates) Ed Jones	Dale Coyne Racing with Vasser-Sullivan	Honda
20	(United States) Conor Daly	Ed Carpenter Racing	Chevrolet
21	(Netherlands) Rinus VeeKay	Ed Carpenter Racing	Chevrolet
22	(France) Simon Pagenaud **W**	Team Penske	Chevrolet
26	(United States) Colton Herta	Andretti Autosport	Honda
27	(United States) Alexander Rossi	Andretti Autosport	Honda
28	(United States) Ryan Hunter-Reay **W**	Andretti Autosport	Honda
29	(Canada) James Hinchcliffe	Andretti Steinbrenner Autosport	Honda
30	(Japan) Takuma Sato	Rahal Letterman Lanigan Racing	Honda
45	(United States) Santino Ferrucci	Rahal Letterman Lanigan Racing	Honda
48	(United States) Jimmie Johnson **R**	Chip Ganassi Racing	Honda
51	(France) Romain Grosjean **R**	Dale Coyne Racing with Rick Ware Racing	Honda
59	(United Kingdom) Max Chilton	Carlin	Chevrolet
60	(United Kingdom) Jack Harvey	Meyer Shank Racing	Honda

=== Practice ===
==== Practice ====
Practice took place at 5:00 PM ET on April 17, 2021. Will Power went fastest in the practice session of the season with a time of 01:17.2768, ahead of Sebastien Bourdais and Pato O'Ward in second and third respectively.

Top Practice Speeds
Pos	No.	Driver	Team	Engine	Lap Time
**1**	12	(Australia) Will Power **W**	Team Penske	Chevrolet	01:17.2768
**2**	14	(France) Sebastien Bourdais **W**	A. J. Foyt Enterprises	Chevrolet	01:17.4291
**3**	5	(Mexico) Pato O'Ward	Arrow McLaren SP	Chevrolet	01:17.5143

=== Qualifying ===
Qualifying took place at 11:10 AM ET on June 12, 2021.

=== Qualifying classification ===
Pos	No.	Driver	Team	Engine	Time			Final grid
Pos	No.	Driver	Team	Engine	Round 1		Round 2	Final grid
Pos	No.	Driver	Team	Engine	Group 1	Group 2	Round 2	Final grid
1	5	(Mexico) Pato O'Ward	Arrow McLaren SP	Chevrolet	01:16.8406	N/A	**01:15.5776**	1
2	27	(United States) Alexander Rossi	Andretti Autosport	Honda	**01:15.8507**	N/A	01:15.6584	2
3	51	(France) Romain Grosjean **R**	Dale Coyne Racing with Rick Ware Racing	Honda	01:16.6715	N/A	01:15.7433	3
4	18	(United Arab Emirates) Ed Jones	Dale Coyne Racing with Vasser-Sullivan	Honda	N/A	01:15.8696	01:15.8119	4
5	2	(United States) Josef Newgarden **W**	Team Penske	Chevrolet	N/A	**01:15.6606**	01:15.6606	5
6	26	(United States) Colton Herta	Andretti Autosport	Honda	N/A	01:15.8439	01:16.0832	6
7	12	(Australia) Will Power **W**	Team Penske	Chevrolet	01:17.0343	N/A	01:16.0877	7
8	28	(United States) Ryan Hunter-Reay **W**	Andretti Autosport	Honda	N/A	01:16.1328	01:16.1293	8
9	22	(France) Simon Pagenaud **W**	Team Penske	Chevrolet	01:16.9636	N/A	01:16.6606	9
10	14	(France) Sebastien Bourdais **W**	A. J. Foyt Enterprises	Chevrolet	N/A	01:16.1339	01:17.4333	10
11	9	(New Zealand) Scott Dixon **W**	Chip Ganassi Racing	Honda	N/A	01:16.3151	01:17.8680	11
12	21	(Netherlands) Rinus VeeKay	Ed Carpenter Racing	Chevrolet	01:16.8172	N/A	01:17.8776	12
13	29	(Canada) James Hinchcliffe	Andretti Steinbrenner Autosport	Honda	01:17.0691	N/A	N/A	13
14	7	(Sweden) Felix Rosenqvist	Arrow McLaren SP	Chevrolet	N/A	01:16.4620	N/A	14
15	8	(Sweden) Marcus Ericsson	Chip Ganassi Racing	Honda	01:17.1579	N/A	N/A	15
16	30	(Japan) Takuma Sato	Rahal Letterman Lanigan Racing	Honda	N/A	01:16.4713	N/A	16
17	20	(United States) Conor Daly	Ed Carpenter Racing	Chevrolet	01:17.2904	N/A	N/A	17
18	59	(United Kingdom) Max Chilton	Carlin	Chevrolet	N/A	01:16.6093	N/A	18
19	60	(United Kingdom) Jack Harvey	Meyer Shank Racing	Honda	01:17.4180	N/A	N/A	19
20	15	(United States) Graham Rahal	Rahal Letterman Lanigan Racing	Honda	N/A	01:16.6694	N/A	20
21	10	(Spain) Álex Palou	Chip Ganassi Racing	Honda	01:17.5190	N/A	N/A	21
22	45	(United States) Santino Ferrucci	Rahal Letterman Lanigan Racing	Honda	N/A	01:16.6880	N/A	22
23	48	(United States) Jimmie Johnson **R**	Chip Ganassi Racing	Honda	01:19.0944	N/A	N/A	22
24	3	(New Zealand) Scott McLaughlin **R**	Team Penske	Honda	N/A	01:17.5569	N/A	24
25	4	(Canada) Dalton Kellett	A. J. Foyt Enterprises	Chevrolet	N/A	01:19.6697	N/A	25

Notes

- **Bold text** indicates fastest time set in session.

=== Race ===
The race started at 3:00 PM ET on June 12, 2021.

=== Race classification ===
Pos	No.	Driver	Team	Engine	Laps	Time/Retired	Pit Stops	Grid	Laps Led	Pts.
1	8	(Sweden) Marcus Ericsson	Chip Ganassi Racing	Honda	70	01:45:33.1123	2	15	5	51
2	21	(Netherlands) Rinus VeeKay	Ed Carpenter Racing	Chevrolet	70	+1.7290	3	12		40
3	5	(Mexico) Pato O'Ward	Arrow McLaren SP	Chevrolet	70	+1.9105	3	1	3	37
4	30	(Japan) Takuma Sato	Rahal Letterman Lanigan Racing	Honda	70	+8.1688	2	16		32
5	15	(United States) Graham Rahal **W**	Rahal Letterman Lanigan Racing	Honda	70	+9.4645	2	20	4	31
6	45	(United States) Santino Ferrucci	Rahal Letterman Lanigan Racing	Honda	70	+9.5670	2	21		28
7	27	(United States) Alexander Rossi	Andretti Autosport	Honda	70	+10.3406	3	2	2	27
8	9	(New Zealand) Scott Dixon **W**	Chip Ganassi Racing	Honda	70	+10.8956	2	11	16	25
9	18	(United Arab Emirates) Ed Jones	Dale Coyne Racing with Vasser-Sullivan	Honda	70	+11.9428	2	4	2	23
10	2	(United States) Josef Newgarden **W**	Team Penske	Chevrolet	70	+12.5061	4	5		20
11	14	(France) Sebastien Bourdais **W**	A. J. Foyt Enterprises	Chevrolet	70	+13.5792	3	10		19
12	22	(France) Simon Pagenaud **W**	Team Penske	Chevrolet	70	+13.8274	2	9		18
13	20	(United States) Conor Daly	Ed Carpenter Racing	Chevrolet	70	+14.7925	3	17		17
14	26	(United States) Colton Herta	Andretti Autosport	Honda	70	+16.0887	3	6		16
15	10	(Spain) Álex Palou	Chip Ganassi Racing	Honda	70	+17.2534	2	25		15
16	60	(United Kingdom) Jack Harvey	Meyer Shank Racing	Honda	70	+18.2898	3	19		14
17	29	(Canada) James Hinchcliffe	Andretti Steinbrenner Autosport	Honda	70	+19.0114	2	13		13
18	4	(Canada) Dalton Kellett	A. J. Foyt Enterprises	Chevrolet	69	+1 Lap	2	24		12
19	3	(New Zealand) Scott McLaughlin **R**	Team Penske	Chevrolet	67	+3 Laps	5	23		11
20	12	(Australia) Will Power **W**	Team Penske	Chevrolet	67	+3 Laps	3	7	37	13
21	28	(United States) Ryan Hunter-Reay **W**	Andretti Autosport	Honda	65	+5 Laps	4	8		9
22	59	(United Kingdom) Max Chilton	Carlin	Chevrolet	65	+5 Laps	3	18		8
23	51	(France) Romain Grosjean **R**	Dale Coyne Racing with Rick Ware Racing	Honda	63	Contact	4	3	1	8
24	48	(United States) Jimmie Johnson **R**	Chip Ganassi Racing	Honda	49	Mechanical	3	22		6
25	7	(Sweden) Felix Rosenqvist	Arrow McLaren SP	Chevrolet	23	Contact	1	14		5
Fastest lap: (United States) Josef Newgarden (Team Penske) – 76.6433 (lap 56)

=== Championship standings after the race ===
Drivers' Championship standings

Pos.	Driver	Points
1	(Spain) Álex Palou	263
2	(Mexico) Pato O'Ward	248
3	(New Zealand) Scott Dixon	237
4	(Netherlands) Rinus VeeKay	231
5	(France) Simon Pagenaud	219

Engine manufacturer standings

Pos.	Manufacturer	Points
1	Honda	576
2	Chevrolet	556

- Note: Only the top five positions are included.

== Race 2 – June 13 ==
=== Entrants ===
25 drivers entered the race, including IndyCar Series debutants Jimmie Johnson (Chip Ganassi Racing) and Romain Grosjean (Dale Coyne Racing with Rick Ware Racing), with Scott McLaughlin (Team Penske). Arrow McLaren SP driver Felix Rosenqvist was injured in Race 1, and Oliver Askew replaced him in Race 2.

Key	Meaning
**R**	Rookie
**W**	Past winner

No.	Driver	Team	Engine
2	(United States) Josef Newgarden **W**	Team Penske	Chevrolet
3	(New Zealand) Scott McLaughlin **R**	Team Penske	Chevrolet
4	(Canada) Dalton Kellett	A. J. Foyt Enterprises	Chevrolet
5	(Mexico) Pato O'Ward	Arrow McLaren SP	Chevrolet
7	(United States) Oliver Askew	Arrow McLaren SP	Chevrolet
8	(Sweden) Marcus Ericsson	Chip Ganassi Racing	Honda
9	(New Zealand) Scott Dixon **W**	Chip Ganassi Racing	Honda
10	(Spain) Álex Palou	Chip Ganassi Racing	Honda
12	(Australia) Will Power **W**	Team Penske	Chevrolet
14	(France) Sébastien Bourdais **W**	A. J. Foyt Enterprises	Chevrolet
15	(United States) Graham Rahal **W**	Rahal Letterman Lanigan Racing	Honda
18	(United Arab Emirates) Ed Jones	Dale Coyne Racing with Vasser-Sullivan	Honda
20	(United States) Conor Daly	Ed Carpenter Racing	Chevrolet
21	(Netherlands) Rinus VeeKay	Ed Carpenter Racing	Chevrolet
22	(France) Simon Pagenaud **W**	Team Penske	Chevrolet
26	(United States) Colton Herta	Andretti Autosport	Honda
27	(United States) Alexander Rossi	Andretti Autosport	Honda
28	(United States) Ryan Hunter-Reay **W**	Andretti Autosport	Honda
29	(Canada) James Hinchcliffe	Andretti Steinbrenner Autosport	Honda
30	(Japan) Takuma Sato	Rahal Letterman Lanigan Racing	Honda
45	(United States) Santino Ferrucci	Rahal Letterman Lanigan Racing	Honda
48	(United States) Jimmie Johnson **R**	Chip Ganassi Racing	Honda
51	(France) Romain Grosjean **R**	Dale Coyne Racing with Rick Ware Racing	Honda
59	(United Kingdom) Max Chilton	Carlin	Chevrolet
60	(United Kingdom) Jack Harvey	Meyer Shank Racing	Honda

=== Qualifying ===
Qualifying took place at 9:00 AM ET on June 13, 2021.

=== Qualifying classification ===
Pos	No.	Driver	Team	Engine	Time			Final grid
Pos	No.	Driver	Team	Engine	Round 1		Round 2	Final grid
Pos	No.	Driver	Team	Engine	Group 1	Group 2	Round 2	Final grid
1	2	(United States) Josef Newgarden **W**	Team Penske	Chevrolet	01:16.3648	N/A	**01:14.1094**	1
2	26	(United States) Colton Herta	Andretti Autosport	Honda	**01:16.0809**	N/A	01:14.4300	2
3	21	(Netherlands) Rinus VeeKay	Ed Carpenter Racing	Chevrolet	N/A	01:15.5845	01:14.8180	3
4	10	(Spain) Álex Palou	Chip Ganassi Racing	Honda	N/A	01:15.8313	01:14.8432	4
5	51	(France) Romain Grosjean **R**	Dale Coyne Racing with Rick Ware Racing	Honda	N/A	01:15.6609	01:14.9060	5
6	9	(New Zealand) Scott Dixon **W**	Chip Ganassi Racing	Honda	01:16.2311	N/A	01:14.9231	6
7	27	(United States) Alexander Rossi	Andretti Autosport	Honda	N/A	**01:15.4664**	01:15.3524	7
8	20	(United States) Conor Daly	Ed Carpenter Racing	Chevrolet	N/A	01:15.7563	01:15.4162	8
9	15	(United States) Graham Rahal **W**	Rahal Letterman Lanigan Racing	Honda	01:16.1965	N/A	01:15.4187	9
10	22	(France) Simon Pagenaud **W**	Team Penske	Chevrolet	N/A	01:15.6949	01:15.5294	10
11	18	(United Arab Emirates) Ed Jones	Dale Coyne Racing with Vasser–Sullivan	Honda	01:16.5380	N/A	01:15.9478	11
12	45	(United States) Santino Ferrucci	Rahal Letterman Racing	Honda	01:16.4188	N/A	01:16.1146	12
13	14	(France) Sebastien Bourdais	A. J. Foyt Enterprises	Chevrolet	01:16.5387	N/A	N/A	13
14	29	(Canada) James Hinchcliffe	Andretti Steinbrenner Autosport	Honda	N/A	01:15.9533	N/A	14
15	59	(United Kingdom) Max Chilton	Carlin	Chevrolet	01:16.6085	N/A	N/A	15
16	5	(Mexico) Pato O'Ward	Arrow McLaren SP	Chevrolet	N/A	01:16.0805	N/A	16
17	29	(United States) Ryan Hunter-Reay **W**	Ed Carpenter Racing	Chevrolet	01:16.6456	N/A	N/A	17
18	60	(United Kingdom) Jack Harvey	Meyer Shank Racing	Honda	N/A	01:16.1356	N/A	18
19	30	(Japan) Takuma Sato	Rahal Letterman Lanigan Racing	Honda	01:16.8947	N/A	N/A	19
20	12	(Australia) Will Power **W**	Team Penske	Chevrolet	N/A	01:16.4386	N/A	20
21	3	(New Zealand) Scott McLaughlin **R**	Team Penske	Chevrolet	01:17.1815	N/A	N/A	21
22	8	(Sweden) Marcus Ericsson **W**	Chip Ganassi Racing	Honda	N/A	01:16.5514	N/A	22
23	7	(United States) Oliver Askew	Arrow McLaren SP	Chevrolet	01:19.1486	N/A	N/A	22
24	4	(Canada) Dalton Kellett	A. J. Foyt Enterprises	Chevrolet	N/A	01:16.5805	N/A	24
25	48	(United States) Jimmie Johnson **R**	Chip Ganassi Racing	Honda	N/A	01:17.9838	N/A	25

Notes

- **Bold text** indicates fastest time set in session.

== Race ==
The race started at 12:00 PM ET on June 13, 2021.

=== Race classification ===
Pos	No.	Driver	Team	Engine	Laps	Time/Retired	Pit Stops	Grid	Laps Led	Pts.
1	5	(Mexico) Pato O'Ward	Arrow McLaren SP	Chevrolet	70	01:41:30.8814	2	16	3	51
2	2	(United States) Josef Newgarden W	Team Penske	Chevrolet	70	+6.7595	2	1	67	44
3	10	(Spain) Álex Palou	Chip Ganassi Racing	Honda	70	+6.9392	2	4		35
4	26	(United States) Colton Herta	Andretti Autosport	Honda	70	+7.0558	2	2		32
5	15	(United States) Graham Rahal W	Rahal Letterman Lanigan Racing	Honda	70	+7.6952	2	9		30
6	12	(Australia) Will Power W	Team Penske	Chevrolet	70	+8.4418	2	20		28
7	9	(New Zealand) Scott Dixon W	Chip Ganassi Racing	Honda	70	+8.8324	2	6		26
8	22	(France) Simon Pagenaud W	Team Penske	Chevrolet	70	+9.0641	2	10		24
9	8	(Sweden) Marcus Ericsson W	Chip Ganassi Racing	Honda	70	+9.5248	3	22		22
10	45	(United States) Santino Ferrucci	Rahal Letterman Lanigan Racing	Honda	70	+10.6860	2	12		20
11	28	(United States) Ryan Hunter-Reay W	Andretti Autosport	Honda	70	+10.9852	2	17		19
12	30	(Japan) Takuma Sato	Rahal Letterman Lanigan Racing	Honda	70	+11.5761	3	19		18
13	27	(United States) Alexander Rossi	Andretti Autosport	Honda	70	+14.2097	2	7		17
14	29	(Canada) James Hinchcliffe	Andretti Steinbrenner Autosport	Honda	70	+14.9968	2	14		16
15	20	(United States) Conor Daly	Ed Carpenter Racing	Chevrolet	70	+15.1529	3	8		15
16	14	(France) Sebastien Bourdais W	A. J. Foyt Enterprises	Chevrolet	70	+15.2726	3	13		14
17	18	(United Arab Emirates) Ed Jones	Dale Coyne Racing with Vasser–Sullivan	Honda	70	+16.1183	3	11		13
18	21	(Netherlands) Rinus VeeKay	Ed Carpenter Racing	Chevrolet	70	+16.8545	4	3		12
19	60	(United Kingdom) Jack Harvey	Meyer Shank Racing	Honda	69	+1 Lap	5	18		11
20	3	(New Zealand) Scott McLaughlin R	Team Penske	Chevrolet	69	+1 Lap	4	21		10
21	48	(United States) Jimmie Johnson R	Chip Ganassi Racing	Honda	69	+1 Lap	3	25		9
22	59	(United Kingdom) Max Chilton	Carlin	Chevrolet	68	+2 Laps	5	15		8
23	4	(Canada) Dalton Kellett	A. J. Foyt Enterprises	Chevrolet	61	+9 Laps	3	24		7
24	51	(France) Romain Grosjean R	Dale Coyne Racing with Rick Ware Racing	Honda	57	Mechanical	4	5		6
25	7	(United States) Oliver Askew	Arrow McLaren SP	Chevrolet	46	Mechanical	4	23		5
Fastest lap: (United States) Colton Herta (Andretti Autosport) – 76.3434 (lap 26)

=== Championship standings after the race ===
Drivers' Championship standings

Pos.	Driver	Points
1	(Mexico) Pato O'Ward	299
2	(Spain) Álex Palou	298
3	(New Zealand) Scott Dixon	263
4	(United States) Josef Newgarden	248
5	(Netherlands) Rinus VeeKay	243

Engine manufacturer standings

Pos.	Manufacturer	Points
1	Chevrolet	652
2	Honda	643

- Note: Only the top five positions are included.

Previous race: 2021 Indianapolis 500	IndyCar Series; 2021 season	Next race: 2021 REV Group Grand Prix at Road America
Previous race: 2019 Chevrolet Detroit Grand Prix	Detroit Grand Prix	Next race: 2022 Chevrolet Detroit Grand Prix
