= 2021 Honda Indy 200 =

(United States) 2021 Honda Indy 200 at Mid-Ohio
Race details
10th round of the 2021 IndyCar season
← Previous race	Next race →
- Date: July 4, 2021
- Official name: Honda Indy 200 at Mid-Ohio Presented by the HPD Ridgeline
- Location: Mid-Ohio Sports Car Course, Lexington, Ohio
- Course: Permanent racing facility 2.258 mi / 3.634 km
- Distance: 80 laps 180.64 mi / 290.71 km

Pole position
- Driver: (United States) (United States) Josef Newgarden (Team Penske)
- Time: 01:06.6739

Fastest lap
- Driver: (United Kingdom) (United Kingdom) Jack Harvey (Meyer Shank Racing)
- Time: 01:08.7341 (on lap 65 of 80)

Podium
- First: (United States) (United States) Josef Newgarden (Team Penske)
- Second: (Sweden) (Sweden) Marcus Ericsson (Chip Ganassi Racing)
- Third: (Spain) (Spain) Álex Palou (Chip Ganassi Racing)

The 2021 Honda Indy 200 at Mid-Ohio was an IndyCar Series event held at Mid-Ohio Sports Car Course in Lexington, Ohio. The race served as the 10th round of the 2021 IndyCar Series season. Josef Newgarden won the race from pole position, leading all but 7 laps. The victory ended Team Penske's longest winless streak to start a season since 1999.

== Background ==
=== Entrants ===
Ryan Norman made his IndyCar debut at Mid-Ohio.

Key	Meaning
R	Rookie
W	Past winner

No.	Driver	Team	Engine
2	(United States) Josef Newgarden W	Team Penske	Chevrolet
3	(New Zealand) Scott McLaughlin R	Team Penske	Chevrolet
4	(Canada) Dalton Kellett	A. J. Foyt Enterprises	Chevrolet
5	(Mexico) Patricio O'Ward	Arrow McLaren SP	Chevrolet
7	(Sweden) Felix Rosenqvist	Arrow McLaren SP	Chevrolet
8	(Sweden) Marcus Ericsson	Chip Ganassi Racing	Honda
9	(New Zealand) Scott Dixon W	Chip Ganassi Racing	Honda
10	(Spain) Álex Palou	Chip Ganassi Racing	Honda
12	(Australia) Will Power W	Team Penske	Chevrolet
14	(France) Sébastien Bourdais	A. J. Foyt Enterprises	Chevrolet
15	(United States) Graham Rahal W	Rahal Letterman Lanigan Racing	Honda
18	(United Arab Emirates) Ed Jones	Dale Coyne Racing with Vasser-Sullivan	Honda
20	(United States) Conor Daly	Ed Carpenter Racing	Chevrolet
21	(United States) Rinus Veekay	Ed Carpenter Racing	Chevrolet
22	(France) Simon Pagenaud W	Team Penske	Chevrolet
26	(United States) Colton Herta W	Andretti Autosport with Curb-Agajanian	Honda
27	(United States) Alexander Rossi W	Andretti Autosport	Honda
28	(United States) Ryan Hunter-Reay	Andretti Autosport	Honda
29	(Canada) James Hinchcliffe	Andretti Steinbrenner Autosport	Honda
30	(Japan) Takuma Sato	Rahal Letterman Lanigan Racing	Honda
45	(United States) Santino Ferrucci	Rahal Letterman Lanigan Racing	Honda
48	(United States) Jimmie Johnson R	Chip Ganassi Racing	Honda
51	(France) Romain Grosjean R	Dale Coyne Racing with Rick Ware Racing	Honda
52	(United States) Ryan Norman R	Dale Coyne Racing with Rick Ware Racing	Honda
59	(United Kingdom) Max Chilton	Carlin	Chevrolet
60	(United Kingdom) Jack Harvey	Meyer Shank Racing	Honda

== Practice ==
=== Practice 1 ===
Practice 1 took place at 2:30 PM ET on July 2, 2021.

Top Practice Speeds
Pos	No.	Driver	Team	Engine	Lap Time
1	2	(United States) Josef Newgarden W	Team Penske	Chevrolet	01:07.2524
2	5	(Mexico) Patricio O'Ward	Arrow McLaren SP	Chevrolet	01:07.5050
3	60	(United Kingdom) Jack Harvey	Meyer Shank Racing	Honda	01:07.5840

=== Practice 2 ===
Practice 2 took place at 9:05 AM ET on July 3, 2021.

Top Practice Speeds
Pos	No.	Driver	Team	Engine	Lap Time
1	5	(Mexico) Patricio O'Ward	Arrow McLaren SP	Chevrolet	01:06.0911
2	2	(United States) Josef Newgarden W	Team Penske	Chevrolet	01:06.0993
3	26	(United States) Colton Herta W	Andretti Autosport with Curb-Agajanian	Honda	01:06.1839

== Qualifying ==
Qualifying took place at 12:00 PM ET on July 3, 2021.

=== Qualifying report ===
Qualifying group 1 saw Will Power not being able to get out on track until there were only four minutes left in the session, after he pitted on his outlap due to a ECU problem. During the final lap, Jack Harvey spun his car at Turn 9, bringing out a local yellow flag right at the end of the sector on the track. Alexander Rossi and Simon Pagenaud both passed the stopped car of Harvey, with Rossi slowing for the yellow while Pagenaud did not. Pagenaud improved his fastest lap time and was set to advance into Q2, but a decision from race control invalidated all three drivers' fastest lap times. Rossi ended up in 6th with his second-fastest lap, advancing him to Q2 along with leader Josef Newgarden, followed by Álex Palou, Will Power, Sébastien Bourdais, and Graham Rahal.

In qualifying group 2, Patricio O'Ward, who had led the practice sessions and was 2nd in the points standings, missed out on advancing to Q2. Former Formula 1 driver Romain Grosjean failed to make it into Q2 for the first time at a road course since his debut in IndyCar. Rinus VeeKay, who broke his collar bone in a bicycle accident just two weeks prior to the race, edged out rookie Scott McLaughlin by 6 milliseconds for a spot in Q2. Colton Herta led the group, followed by Scott Dixon, Marcus Ericsson, Ryan Hunter-Reay, and James Hinchcliffe.

Q2 started with the drivers of the Chip Ganassi Racing Team going out on the track with slightly worn alternate compound tyres, as opposed to the other teams running the primary compound, before they pit for new alternate compound tyres for their qualifying laps. Sébastien Bourdais had to serve a drive-through penalty for speeding in the pit lane and didn't set a fast lap, finishing last in the session. Late in the session, Dixon and Ericsson moved into 5th and 6th respectively, Ericsson setting a lap only 4 hundredths of a second faster than championship points leader Palou, followed out of Q2 by Rahal, Hinchcliffe, Hunter-Reay, and VeeKay.

Newgarden led the final 6 drivers going into Q3, behind him was Herta, Power, Rossi, Dixon, and Ericsson. Power fell to 4th after a mistake on his fast lap, promoting Ericsson to 3rd, with Dixon in 5th and Rossi in 6th. Newgarden and Herta both led the field's times by 0.4 seconds, but Newgarden came out on top of the two with an extremely thin margin of 3 milliseconds between their lap times. Newgarden's pole position for Team Penske marked the anniversary of the teams's first win in 1971, where Mark Donohue won at the Pocono 500; it was also the first time a driver achieved three consecutive poles since 2015.

=== Qualifying classification ===
Pos	No.	Driver	Team	Engine	Time				Final grid
Pos	No.	Driver	Team	Engine	Round 1		Round 2	Round 3	Final grid
Pos	No.	Driver	Team	Engine	Group 1	Group 2	Round 2	Round 3	Final grid
1	2	(United States) Josef Newgarden **W**	Team Penske	Chevrolet	**01:06.0168**	N/A	**01:06.1630**	**01:06.6739**	1
2	26	(United States) Colton Herta	Andretti Autosport with Curb-Agajanian	Honda	N/A	**01:06.2685**	01:06.2030	01:06.6770	2
3	8	(Sweden) Marcus Ericsson	Chip Ganassi Racing	Honda	N/A	01:06.4587	01:06.4499	01:07.0723	3
4	12	(Australia) Will Power **W**	Team Penske	Chevrolet	01:06.5423	N/A	01:06.2386	01:07.1161	4
5	9	(New Zealand) Scott Dixon **W**	Chip Ganassi Racing	Honda	N/A	01:06.3232	01:06.2775	01:07.1358	5
6	27	(United States) Alexander Rossi **W**	Andretti Autosport	Honda	01:06.6453	N/A	01:06.2453	01:07.2181	6
7	9	(Spain) Álex Palou	Chip Ganassi Racing	Honda	01:06.5130	N/A	01:06.4883	N/A	7
8	15	(United States) Graham Rahal **W**	Rahal Letterman Lanigan Racing	Honda	01:06.5603	N/A	01:06.5946	N/A	8
9	29	(Canada) James Hinchcliffe	Andretti Steinbrenner Autosport	Honda	N/A	01:06.7155	01:06.6134	N/A	9
10	28	(United States) Ryan Hunter-Reay	Andretti Autosport	Honda	N/A	01:06.5961	01:06.7517	N/A	10
11	21	(United States) Rinus Veekay	Ed Carpenter Racing	Chevrolet	N/A	01:06.7250	01:06.7671	N/A	11
12	14	(France) Sébastien Bourdais	A. J. Foyt Enterprises	Chevrolet	01:06.6117	N/A	01:06.9232	N/A	12
13	7	(Sweden) Felix Rosenqvist	Arrow McLaren SP	Chevrolet	01:06.7898	N/A	N/A	N/A	13
14	3	(New Zealand) Scott McLaughlin **R**	Team Penske	Chevrolet	N/A	01:06.7313	N/A	N/A	14
15	22	(France) Simon Pagenaud **W**	Team Penske	Chevrolet	01:06.8437	N/A	N/A	N/A	15
16	18	(United Arab Emirates) Ed Jones	Dale Coyne Racing with Vasser-Sullivan	Honda	N/A	01:06.7882	N/A	N/A	16
17	59	(United Kingdom) Max Chilton	Carlin	Chevrolet	01:06.8473	N/A	N/A	N/A	17
18	51	(France) Romain Grosjean **R**	Dale Coyne Racing with Rick Ware Racing	Honda	N/A	01:06.8642	N/A	N/A	18
19	30	(Japan) Takuma Sato	Rahal Letterman Lanigan Racing	Honda	01:07.0951	N/A	N/A	N/A	19
20	5	(Mexico) Patricio O'Ward	Arrow McLaren SP	Chevrolet	N/A	01:06.8679	N/A	N/A	20
21	4	(Canada) Dalton Kellett	A. J. Foyt Enterprises	Chevrolet	01:07.5866	N/A	N/A	N/A	21
22	45	(United States) Santino Ferrucci	Rahal Letterman Lanigan Racing	Honda	N/A	01:06.9254	N/A	N/A	22
23	60	(United Kingdom) Jack Harvey	Meyer Shank Racing	Honda	01:07.6740	N/A	N/A	N/A	23
24	20	(United States) Conor Daly	Ed Carpenter Racing	Chevrolet	N/A	01:07.0704	N/A	N/A	24
25	48	(United States) Jimmie Johnson **R**	Chip Ganassi Racing	Honda	01:08.4077	N/A	N/A	N/A	25
26	52	(United States) Ryan Norman **R**	Dale Coyne Racing with Rick Ware Racing	Honda	N/A	01:07.4714	N/A	N/A	26

Notes

- **Bold text** indicates fastest time set in session.

== Final Practice ==
=== Final Practice ===
Final practice took place at 3:30 PM ET on July 3, 2021.

Top Practice Speeds
Pos	No.	Driver	Team	Engine	Lap Time
1	9	(New Zealand) Scott Dixon W	Chip Ganassi Racing	Honda	01:08.0256
2	26	(United States) Colton Herta W	Andretti Autosport with Curb-Agajanian	Honda	01:08.0745
3	51	(France) Romain Grosjean R	Dale Coyne Racing with Rick Ware Racing	Honda	01:08.1490

== Race ==
The race took place at 12:00 PM ET on July 4, 2021.

=== Race report ===
After airing concerns about his engine's performance, Josef Newgarden's engine was replaced before race day. Newgarden got a well-sized jump as the race went under the green flag, with cars bunching up behind him. On the exit of the first turn of the race, James Hinchcliffe clipped the right-side rear of his teammate Ryan Hunter-Reay, sending himself into a spin and Hunter-Reay into the tyre barrier, bringing out the yellow flag. Felix Rosenqvist, who was behind Hinchcliffe, slowed down to avoid his car, but was rear-ended and spun around. All three drivers pitted after the incident, with Rosenqvist and Hunter-Reay's pit crews attempting to repair damage; Hinchcliffe took a new set of tyres and returned to the track. Rosenqvist returned to the track one lap down, and Hunter-Reay 2 laps down.

Racing resumed on lap 3, but would be put under yellow again a lap later when Scott Dixon pressured Will Power on the inside of turn 5, hitting Power's right front and sending him into a spin. Power spun his rear wheels and kicked up a smoke cloud on the blind downhill after turn 5, and his car stopped on track after the engine stalled. Due to visibility issues with all of the smoke Ed Jones crashed into Power's car, taking them both out of the race. Power had his hand bandaged after the incident.

Racing again resumed on lap 9, where Romain Grosjean passed Scott McLaughlin for 10th place, then trying to get around Sébastien Bourdais on lap 10, who blocked the inside of turn 2, with Grosjean nearly going completely off track, sliding his car around the turn. On lap 32, Colton Herta took his regular green flag pit stop, but an issue refueling his car caused the pit stop to be much longer than usual. Herta came out of his pit box after a 25-second stop (average stop is 6-10 seconds), coming out of the pits in 8th, dropping 6 positions down the order, and an additional position dropped after Graham Rahal passed him on the back straight. Herta made his second stop on lap 57, this time stalling his car before coming out of the pit box.

After the final cycle of pit stops for all drivers, Newgarden was leading by 6.5 seconds to Marcus Ericsson, with Álex Palou and the rest of the pack trailing Ericsson by 13 seconds. With 9 laps to go, Ericsson had halved the gap between himself and Newgarden. Ericsson continued to close in on Newgarden as the finish neared, Newgarden using up his remaining push-to-pass power to hold off Ericsson. At the start of the final lap, the gap between the two drivers was less than 1 second, but Newgarden successfully held off the advance, and crossed the finish line after leading 73 of 80 laps of the race.

Herta had to stop again on the last lap due to not having enough fuel to finish the race. Meanwhile, Patricio O'Ward came back from his poor qualifying performance, finishing the race in 8th, gaining 12 positions overall. Grosjean also recovered his qualifying drive, finishing ahead of O'Ward after starting 18th. Despite setting the fastest lap of the race on lap 65, Jack Harvey's three-stop strategy put him down in 19th place.

=== Race classification ===
Pos	No.	Driver	Team	Engine	Laps	Time/Retired	Pit Stops	Grid	Laps Led	Pts.
1	2	(United States) Josef Newgarden W	Team Penske	Chevrolet	80	1:39:58.8551	2	1	73	54
2	8	(Sweden) Marcus Ericsson	Chip Ganassi Racing	Honda	80	+0.8790	2	3	2	41
3	10	(Spain) Álex Palou	Chip Ganassi Racing	Honda	80	+22.2350	2	7		35
4	9	(New Zealand) Scott Dixon W	Chip Ganassi Racing	Honda	80	+32.3775	2	5		32
5	27	(United States) Alexander Rossi W	Andretti Autosport	Honda	80	+33.1414	2	6		30
6	15	(United States) Graham Rahal W	Rahal Letterman Lanigan Racing	Honda	80	+34.1226	2	8		28
7	51	(France) Romain Grosjean R	Dale Coyne Racing with Rick Ware Racing	Honda	80	+35.1630	2	18		26
8	5	(Mexico) Patricio O'Ward	Arrow McLaren SP	Chevrolet	80	+35.6929	2	20		24
9	45	(United States) Santino Ferrucci	Rahal Letterman Lanigan Racing	Honda	80	+35.9931	2	22		22
10	30	(Japan) Takuma Sato	Rahal Letterman Lanigan Racing	Honda	80	+50.3316	2	19		20
11	14	(France) Sébastien Bourdais	A. J. Foyt Enterprises	Chevrolet	80	+52.0013	2	12		19
12	3	(New Zealand) Scott McLaughlin R	Team Penske	Chevrolet	80	+52.4250	2	14		18
13	26	(United States) Colton Herta W	Andretti Autosport with Curb-Agajanian	Honda	80	+56.8482	3	2	5	18
14	22	(France) Simon Pagenaud W	Team Penske	Chevrolet	80	+58.3495	2	15		16
15	20	(United States) Conor Daly	Ed Carpenter Racing	Chevrolet	80	+58.8125	2	24		15
16	21	(United States) Rinus Veekay	Ed Carpenter Racing	Chevrolet	80	+59.6397	2	11		14
17	29	(Canada) James Hinchcliffe	Andretti Steinbrenner Autosport	Honda	80	+1:07.5124	3	9		13
18	59	(United Kingdom) Max Chilton	Carlin	Chevrolet	80	+1:08.0533	3	17		12
19	60	(United Kingdom) Jack Harvey	Meyer Shank Racing	Honda	80	+1:08.4796	3	23		11
20	52	(United States) Ryan Norman R	Dale Coyne Racing with Rick Ware Racing	Honda	79	+1 Lap	3	26		10
21	4	(Canada) Dalton Kellett	A. J. Foyt Enterprises	Chevrolet	79	+1 Lap	2	21		9
22	48	(United States) Jimmie Johnson R	Chip Ganassi Racing	Honda	79	+1 Lap	4	25		8
23	7	(Sweden) Felix Rosenqvist	Arrow McLaren SP	Chevrolet	78	+2 Laps	5	13		7
24	28	(United States) Ryan Hunter-Reay	Andretti Autosport	Honda	78	+2 Laps	4	10		6
25	12	(Australia) Will Power W	Team Penske	Chevrolet	3	Contact	0	4		5
26	18	(United Arab Emirates) Ed Jones	Dale Coyne Racing with Vasser-Sullivan	Honda	3	Contact	0	16		5
Fastest lap: (United Kingdom) Jack Harvey (Meyer Shank Racing) – 01:08.7341 (lap 65)

== Championship standings after the race ==
Drivers' Championship standings

Pos	Driver	Points
1	(Spain) Álex Palou	384
2	(Mexico) Patricio O'Ward	345
3	(New Zealand) Scott Dixon	328
4	(United States) Josef Newgarden	315
5	(Sweden) Marcus Ericsson	280

Manufacturer standings

Pos	Manufacturer	Points
1	(Japan) Honda	863
2	(United States) Chevrolet	790

- Note: Only the top five positions are included.

Previous race: 2021 REV Group Grand Prix at Road America	IndyCar Series; 2021 season	Next race: 2021 Big Machine Music City Grand Prix
Previous race: 2020 Honda Indy 200	Indy 200 at Mid-Ohio	Next race: 2022 Honda Indy 200
