= 2011 U.S. F2000 Winterfest =

The 2011 U.S. F2000 Cooper Tires Winterfest was the first winter racing series promoted by the U.S. F2000 National Championship. It consisted of five races held during two race meets in January 2011. It served as preparation for the 2011 U.S. F2000 National Championship and was contested using 2010 rules.

The championship saw only a handful of entries. Zach Veach won the championship over Andretti Autosport teammate Spencer Pigot by six points as they each won two races. Vinícius Perdigão won the first race but faded to fourth in the championship. J. R. Smart was the only National Class entrant and won that championship by default.

== Drivers and teams ==
Team	No	Drivers	Notes
(United States) Pabst Racing Services	06	(United States) J. R. Smart	Homestead
(United States) Pabst Racing Services	9	(United States) J. R. Smart	Sebring
(United States) Andretti Autosport	7	(United States) Zach Veach	
(United States) Andretti Autosport	18	(United States) Spencer Pigot	
(United States) JDC MotorSports	11	(Brazil) Vinícius Perdigão	
(Canada) Brian Stewart Racing	33	(Canada) Matthew Di Leo	
(United States) ArmsUp Motorsports	46	(United States) Trent Hindman	Sebring
(United States) ArmsUp Motorsports	49	(United States) Trent Hindman	Homestead

== Race calendar and results ==
The race schedule was announced on September 30, 2010.

Rnd	Circuit	Location	Date	Pole position	Fastest lap	Most laps led	Winning driver	Winning team
1	Sebring Raceway	Sebring, Florida	January 3	(United States) Zach Veach	(United States) Zach Veach	(Brazil) Vinícius Perdigão	(Brazil) Vinícius Perdigão	(United States) JDC MotorSports
2	Sebring Raceway	Sebring, Florida	January 4	(United States) Zach Veach	(United States) Zach Veach	(United States) Zach Veach	(United States) Zach Veach	(United States) Andretti Autosport
3	Homestead-Miami Speedway (road course)	Homestead, Florida	January 12	(United States) Spencer Pigot	(United States) Spencer Pigot	(United States) Spencer Pigot	(United States) Spencer Pigot	(United States) Andretti Autosport
4	Homestead-Miami Speedway (road course)	Homestead, Florida	January 13	(United States) Zach Veach	(United States) Trent Hindman	(United States) Zach Veach	(United States) Zach Veach	(United States) Andretti Autosport
5	Homestead-Miami Speedway (road course)	Homestead, Florida	January 13	(United States) Spencer Pigot	(United States) Zach Veach	(United States) Spencer Pigot	(United States) Spencer Pigot	(United States) Andretti Autosport

== Championship standings ==
=== Drivers' ===
Pos	Driver	SEB		HMS			Points
Championship Class
1	(United States) Zach Veach	**6**	**1***	2	**1***	2	119
2	(United States) Spencer Pigot	5	2	**1***	3	1*	113
3	(Canada) Matthew Di Leo	3	4	5	4	3	97
4	(Brazil) Vinícius Perdigão	1*	3	4	5	6	90
5	(United States) Trent Hindman	2	DNS	3	2	5	74
National Class
1	(United States) J. R. Smart	4	4	6	6	4	110
Pos	Driver	SEB		HMS			Points

Color	Result
Gold	Winner
Silver	2nd place
Bronze	3rd place
Green	4th & 5th place
Light Blue	6th–10th place
Dark Blue	Finished (Outside Top 10)
Purple	Did not finish
Red	Did not qualify (DNQ)
Brown	Withdrawn (Wth)
Black	Disqualified (DSQ)
White	Did not start (DNS)
Blank	Did not participate (DNP)
Blank	Not competing

**In-line notation**
**Bold**	Pole position (1 point)
Italics	Ran fastest race lap (1 point)
*	Led most race laps (1 point)

== See also ==
- 2011 IndyCar Series season
