= Shannon McIntosh =

Shannon McIntosh may refer to:

- Shannon McIntosh (racing driver)
- Shannon McIntosh (filmmaker)
