= 2020 Indianapolis 500 =

American motor race

104th Indianapolis 500

Indianapolis Motor Speedway

Indianapolis 500
- Sanctioning body: IndyCar
- Season: 2020 IndyCar season
- Date: August 23, 2020 (Note: The 2020 Indy 500 was originally scheduled to be held on May 24th, 2020.)
- Winner: (Japan) Takuma Sato
- Winning team: Rahal Letterman Lanigan Racing
- Winning Chief Mechanic: Brad Wright
- Time of race: 3:10:05.088
- Average speed: 157.824 mph (253.993 km/h)
- Pole position: (United States) Marco Andretti
- Pole speed: 231.068 mph (371.868 km/h)
- Fastest qualifier: (United States) Marco Andretti
- Rookie of the Year: (Mexico) Patricio O'Ward
- Most laps led: (New Zealand) Scott Dixon (111)

Pre-race ceremonies
- National anthem: Dr. Elvis Francois & Dr. William Robinson
- "Back Home Again in Indiana": Jim Cornelison
- Starting command: Roger Penske
- Pace car: Chevrolet Corvette (C8) Stingray
- Pace car driver: Mark Reuss
- Two-seater: Mario Andretti (driver); Michael Andretti (passenger)
- Starter: Bryan Howard, Tom Hansing, Aaron Likens
- Honorary starter: Dan Towriss

Television in the United States
- Network: NBC
- Announcers: Leigh Diffey, Townsend Bell, Paul Tracy
- Nielsen ratings: 2.26 (3.669 million viewers)

Chronology
Previous	Next
2019	2021

Indianapolis Motor Speedway layout

The 2020 Indianapolis 500 (branded as the 104th Running of the Indianapolis 500 presented by Gainbridge for sponsorship reasons) was a 500-mile (800 km, 200-lap) automobile race held on Sunday, August 23, 2020, at the Indianapolis Motor Speedway in Speedway, Indiana. It was the premier event of the 2020 IndyCar Series. Takuma Sato won the race for Rahal Letterman Lanigan Racing, his second Indianapolis 500 win, having previously won the 2017 race. It was also the second Indy 500 victory for car owners Bobby Rahal and David Letterman (2004, 2020). It was Rahal's third overall victory overall in the event, as he won as a driver in 1986. It was also Honda's first Indy 500 win in the Reiwa era.

Five-time IndyCar Series champion, and 2008 race winner Scott Dixon started in the middle of the front row, and dominated much of the race. Dixon led 111 laps, and led by as many as 7 seconds at one point during the first half. After the final round of pit stops, however, Takuma Sato chased down and passed Dixon for position on lap 172, which proved to be the winning move. After all other cars had cycled through their final pit stops, Sato elevated to the lead on lap 186. He was leading the race on lap 196 when a caution came out for a heavy crash by Spencer Pigot at the pit lane attenuator. With insufficient time to red flag the race for the cleanup, the final four laps were run under caution with Sato taking the checkered flag.

Originally scheduled for May 24, the race was postponed to August 23 due to the COVID-19 pandemic in Indiana. The 2020 running was the first time the race was not held on or around Memorial Day in late May. On August 4, it was announced that the race would be held without spectators.

Practice was held on August 12–14 and time trials was held on August 15–16. Carb Day, the traditional final day of practice, was scheduled for August 21. A truncated schedule was utilized, as the Open Test, along with two practice days were deleted. In addition, numerous ancillary events (Freedom 100, Pit Stop Challenge, concerts, and various festivities) were cancelled. Marco Andretti, son of Michael Andretti and grandson of 1969 Indianapolis 500 winner Mario Andretti, won the pole position for Andretti Autosport. The achievement came 33 years after Mario won his third pole in 1987, and was the first Indy pole for the Andretti team since 2005. Andretti ended up finishing 13th, while the previous year's winner Simon Pagenaud of Team Penske finished 22nd.

== Race background ==
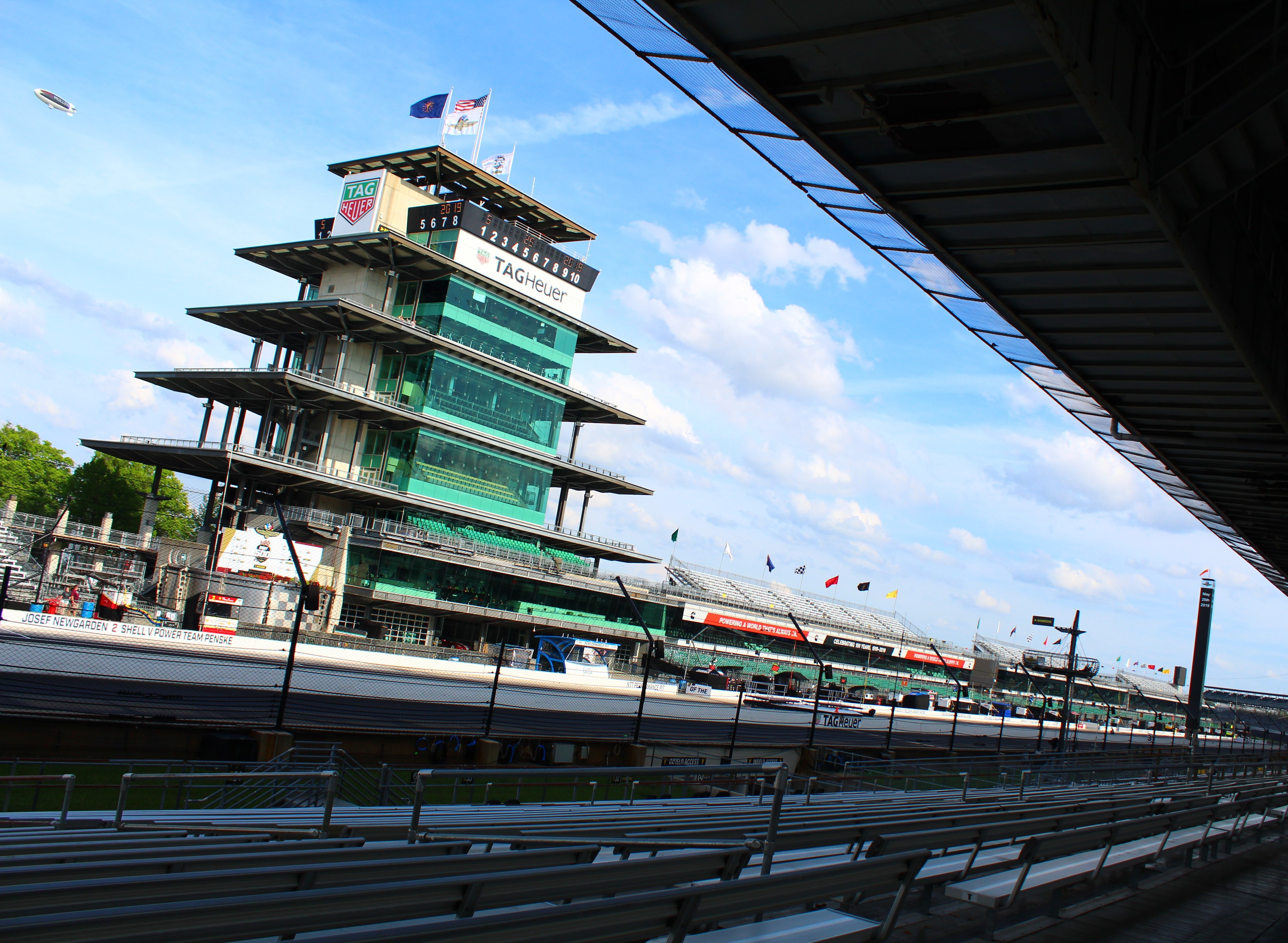
The Pagoda, the control tower which houses officials, broadcasting, and hospitality suites, is an icon at the Indianapolis Motor Speedway.

=== Sponsorship ===
On January 31, 2019, it was announced that the online financial services company Gainbridge would become the new presenting sponsor of the 500 under a four-year deal. This was the second year under the current deal.

=== Safety changes ===
On May 24, 2019, it was announced that IndyCar Series would introduce cockpit protection combining an aeroscreen and Halo system from 2020 season onward. The cockpit protection was built by Red Bull Advanced Technologies. The combination of aeroscreen and halo is designed to improve safety standards by deflecting debris away from a driver's head and was originally developed for use in Formula One and IndyCar before its application was expanded to other open-wheel championships. During the first two races of the season, drivers experienced stifling heat in the cockpits, caused by the now limited airflow. A supplemental air duct was added to the aeroscreen beginning at Iowa to help cool the cockpits.

On July 17, 2020, the aeroscreen had its first major test at Iowa Speedway during the 2020 Iowa IndyCar 250s when during an aborted restart on lap 157, Ed Carpenter Racing's Rinus VeeKay appeared to slow behind eventual race winner Simon Pagenaud and move to the right, and behind the Dutch rookie, Andretti Harding Steinbrenner Racing's Colton Herta was caught in an accordion affect, launching the No. 88 Honda over the left-rear tire of VeeKay's No. 21 Chevy. Prior to getting significantly airborne, Herta's unimpeded nose—minus its wings—attempted to spear into the left side of VeeKay's cockpit, level with his helmet. With the aeroscreen acting as a vertical barrier, Herta's nose was forced upward, sliding skyward on the screen before hitting the top of the aeroscreen frame and flying over VeeKay's Dallara DW12 chassis. This saved VeeKay from apparent serious injury.

=== Ownership changes ===
On November 3, 2019, it was announced that Penske Entertainment Corp., a subsidiary of the Penske Corporation, owned by Roger Penske, had purchased the Indianapolis Motor Speedway, the IndyCar Series, and IMS Productions. Penske, owner of Team Penske stepped down as full-time race strategist to focus on the new ownership roles. The sale was finalized in January 2020.

Shortly after acquiring the property, Penske swiftly began upgrading and beautifying several areas at the track, particularly in the spectator areas. A refurbishment of the restrooms and concession stands, as well as widening and re-paving/paving walkways behind the grandstands along with new fencing was completed in the spring. Thirty new video boards were installed along the mainstretch grandstands, along with a new 104-foot (32 m) video screen on the back of the Pagoda in the Pagoda Plaza. Other improvements included power washing, painting, improved internet service, general repairs, landscaping, hardscaping, and new lighting at the main gate. The victory lane podium was refurbished to include a new platform hoist to lift the winning car to the top.

=== Qualifying changes ===
- The Last Row Shootout was expanded to a 75-minute session in order to allow multiple qualifying attempts for each participant. In the previous year participants in the shootout were permitted only one attempt. However, only 33 cars entered the 2020 event meaning there would be no last row shootout in 2020.
- For practice on Fast Friday (August 14) and during time trials (August 15–16), turbocharger boost settings were increased to allow an additional 45 horsepower (34 kW). Engines were permitted 150 kPa of turbocharger "boost".

=== Rule changes ===
- Teams were permitted seven crew members over-the-wall servicing the car during pit stops. This was up from six utilized from 1988 to 2019. The sole purpose of the seventh member is to clean or remove tear-offs from the new aeroscreen. Teams were allowed four tire changers, one fueler, one pneumatic jack operator, and one aeroscreen attendant. The aeroscreen attendant is not permitted to service any other part of the car. After cockpit cooling issues during the first two races of the season, the aeroscreen attendant was also given the permission to provide the driver with a drink bottle.
- Grid penalties for unapproved engine changes were reinstated for the 2020 season. However, no penalties were served at the Indianapolis 500. Penalties from the previous race, or penalties incurred at the 500 were enforced at Gateway.
- Any unapproved work performed on a car during red flag conditions will result in immediate disqualification (Rule 7.1.4.2.4). Previously, cars were only assessed a two-lap penalty for unapproved work during red flags.

== Schedule ==
On March 12, 2020, the Speedway announced that the threat of the COVID-19 pandemic had not yet caused any changes to the proposed schedule. One day later on March 13, IndyCar officials announced that the first four races of the 2020 IndyCar season would be cancelled, along with the open test at Indianapolis scheduled for April 30. On March 26, the series announced the rescheduling of the 2020 Indianapolis 500 to August 23. The GMR Grand Prix was rescheduled for and held July 4, as part of the NASCAR Brickyard 400 weekend, and a matinee doubleheader with the Xfinity Series Pennzoil 150. On May 31, it was announced that the 2020 Indy Lights season had been cancelled, and therefore the Freedom 100, traditionally run on Carb Day, would not be held.

The first two IndyCar events (Texas and GMR Grand Prix) were held mostly behind closed doors. Roger Penske stated on June 8 that "we are going to run it [Indianapolis 500] with fans", and that the race could be delayed further if they are unable to admit spectators. On June 26, it was initially announced that spectators would be admitted for the Indianapolis 500 at half capacity, including restricting grandstands, and not holding the Snake Pit concert party.

On July 20, Penske Entertainment CEO Mark Miles stated that the IndyCar Series was continuing to work with local health officials, and that "unless the COVID-19 world crashes in on us and healthcare metrics really turn south meaningfully, I'm quite confident we'll be able to do the race." On July 21, the Speedway announced the attendance cap for the race would be reduced to a quarter of its total capacity, and that attendees would be required to wear face coverings. On August 4, citing COVID-19 case trends in Marion County (which contains Indianapolis and IMS), it was announced that the race would be held without spectators.

On August 7, the Last Row Shootout, previously scheduled to take place directly before the Fast Nine Shootout on August 16, was cancelled since the final entry list did not contain more than 33 entries.

Race schedules – August 2020
Sun	Mon	Tue	Wed	Thu	Fri	Sat
9	10	11	12; ROP; Practice	13; Practice	14; Practice; Fast Friday	15; Time Trials
16; Fast 9 Shootout; Practice	17	18	19	20	21; Carb Day	22
23; Indianapolis; 500	24	25	26	27	28	29; Gateway; Race #1
30; Gateway; Race #2	31					

Color	Notes
Green	Practice
Dark Blue	Time trials
Silver	Race day
Red	Rained out*
Blank	No track activity

* Includes days where track
activity was significantly limited due to rain

Source: 2020 Indianapolis 500 Event Schedule

=== Festivities ===
On March 18, it was announced that the 500 Festival Mini-Marathon scheduled for May 2 would not be held. On July 22, Legends Day and the 500 Festival Parade downtown were cancelled. The annual Last Row Party was cancelled, as well as the annual Old Timers Banquet and Hall of Fame induction ceremony. The 2020 Hall of Fame class (Janet Guthrie and Dale Earnhardt Sr.) will be inducted alongside the 2021 class.

On August 4, it was announced that the Pit Stop Challenge, traditionally held on Carb Day, would be cancelled. On August 7, the traditional balloon release was removed from the pre-race festivities.

Dr. Elvis Francois and Dr. William Robinson, known as the "Singing Surgeons", will perform "The Star-Spangled Banner". Francois and Robinson previously performed "God Bless America" during the NBC Special "Back Home Again" on May 24. Jim Cornelison returned for his fourth year to perform "Back Home Again in Indiana"

=== Start time ===
Citing summer heat, the Speedway announced the start time would be moved back one hour and forty-five minutes from 12:45 p.m. to 2:30 p.m. (EDT), the latest scheduled start time of the Indianapolis 500. For many years after World War II, the race had traditionally been scheduled to start at 11 a.m. local time, which was typically equivalent to 12 p.m. EDT. After exceptions in 1970 (12 p.m. local time), and from 2005 to 2010 (1 p.m.), the race went back to a 12 p.m. EDT (approximate) start time since 2011, but switched to 12:45 p.m. in 2019 under NBC's television contract.

With the final round coverage of The Open Championship at Royal Troon, a women's golf major (the men's had been cancelled that year), scheduled for August 23 to air on NBC, the later start time allows The Open to finish without interfering with television coverage of the Indy 500.

On July 8, NASCAR announced the remainder of its schedule through the end of August, which included a 200-mile Xfinity Series and 500-kilometer Cup Series doubleheader at Dover the same day as the Indy 500. The races were part of a twin race weekend for both series where both series raced the respective distances (the Saturday races are the May races postponed by the pandemic; the Cup Series races were trimmed by 89 laps and became 500-kilometer races). The races aired in part against the Indy 500 on NBCSN.

=== Original schedule ===
The original schedule for the 2020 Indianapolis 500 was released in early 2020.

Date	Event
April 30	Open test
May 2	500 Festival Mini-Marathon
May 8–9	GMR Grand Prix
May 12–15	Practice
May 16–17	Time Trials
May 18	Post-qualifying practice
May 22	Carb Day / Freedom 100 / Pit Stop Challenge
May 23	Legends Day / Parade
May 24	Race day

== Entry list ==
The official entry list was published by IndyCar on August 10 with a total of 33 car/driver combinations. All entries used the Dallara IR12 chassis, with Firestone tires. A total of eight former Indy 500 winners were included. It was the most former winners in the field since there were ten in 1992.

Three-time Indy 500 winner Hélio Castroneves (2001, 2002, 2009) made his 20th consecutive start. He became the 9th driver all time to achieve 20 career starts. He moved into a tie for third all time for most consecutive starts. This would be his last 500 for Team Penske.

As the defending Indy Lights champion, Oliver Askew was guaranteed an entry as part of the Road to Indy scholarship program. He signed with Arrow McLaren SP. Two-time Formula One World Champion Fernando Alonso confirmed that he was returning for his third Indianapolis 500 attempt, in a third Arrow McLaren SP entry.

Byrd Racing announced they would not field a dedicated entry due to financial issues, but later announced a deal that "had come together quickly" with Dale Coyne Racing, Indy Lights team Belardi Auto Racing and NASCAR and sports car team Rick Ware Racing to field a car for James Davison.

DragonSpeed became the 33rd entry for the race after finding the necessary funding the weekend before opening practice.

For the first time since 1999, there was not a female driver in the starting lineup. The 2020 race also marked the first time since 1991 that not a single female driver was entered.

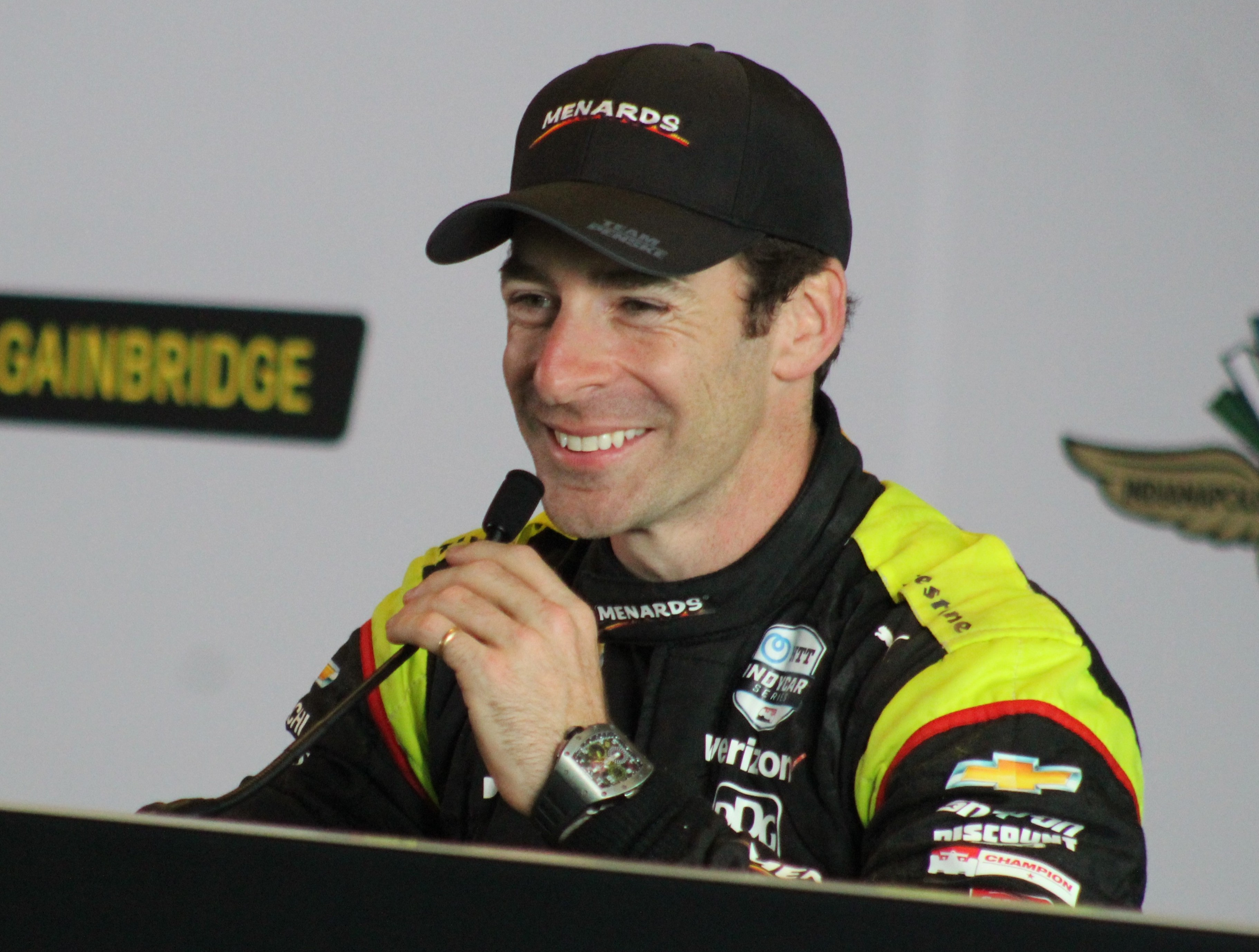
Defending Indy 500 winner and pole winner Simon Pagenaud

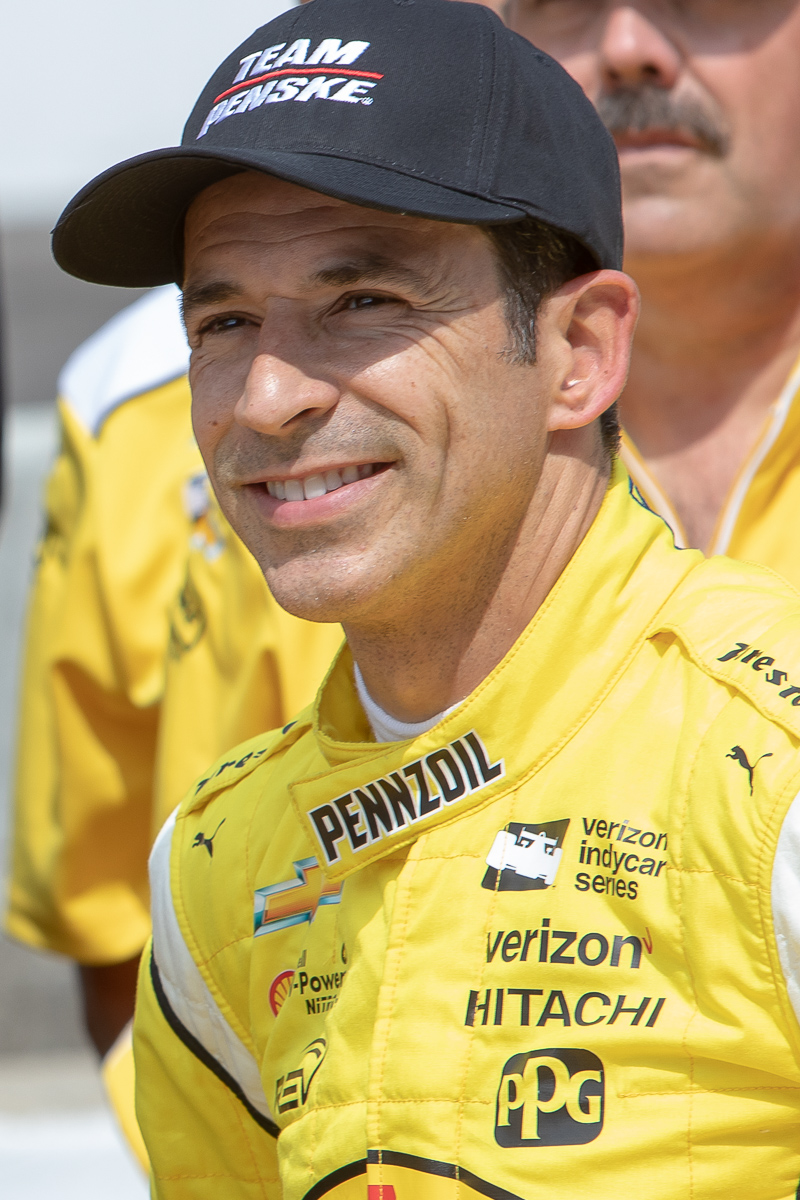
Three-time Indy 500 winner Hélio Castroneves has the most previous starts in the field with 19.

No.	Driver	Team	Engine
1	(United States) Josef Newgarden	Team Penske	Chevrolet
3	(Brazil) Hélio Castroneves W	Team Penske	Chevrolet
4	(United States) Charlie Kimball	A. J. Foyt Enterprises	Chevrolet
5	(Mexico) Patricio O'Ward R (Note: O'Ward, who was an NTT IndyCar Series rookie in 2019, failed to qualify for the 2019 Indianapolis 500, so he must retake all phases of the Indianapolis 500 rookie test and will be eligible for all Indianapolis 500 rookie awards.)	Arrow McLaren SP	Chevrolet
7	(United States) Oliver Askew R	Arrow McLaren SP	Chevrolet
8	(Sweden) Marcus Ericsson	Chip Ganassi Racing	Honda
9	(New Zealand) Scott Dixon W	Chip Ganassi Racing	Honda
10	(Sweden) Felix Rosenqvist	Chip Ganassi Racing	Honda
12	(Australia) Will Power W	Team Penske	Chevrolet
14	(Brazil) Tony Kanaan W	A. J. Foyt Enterprises	Chevrolet
15	(United States) Graham Rahal	Rahal Letterman Lanigan Racing	Honda
18	(United States) Santino Ferrucci	Dale Coyne Racing with Vasser-Sullivan	Honda
20	(United States) Ed Carpenter	Ed Carpenter Racing	Chevrolet
21	(Netherlands) Rinus VeeKay R	Ed Carpenter Racing	Chevrolet
22	(France) Simon Pagenaud W	Team Penske	Chevrolet
24	(United States) Sage Karam	Dreyer & Reinbold Racing	Chevrolet
26	(United States) Zach Veach	Andretti Autosport	Honda
27	(United States) Alexander Rossi W	Andretti Autosport	Honda
28	(United States) Ryan Hunter-Reay W	Andretti Autosport	Honda
29	(Canada) James Hinchcliffe	Andretti Autosport	Honda
30	(Japan) Takuma Sato W	Rahal Letterman Lanigan Racing	Honda
41	(Canada) Dalton Kellett R	A. J. Foyt Enterprises	Chevrolet
45	(United States) Spencer Pigot	Rahal Letterman Lanigan Racing	Honda
47	(United States) Conor Daly	Ed Carpenter Racing	Chevrolet
51	(Australia) James Davison	Dale Coyne Racing with Rick Ware Racing and Byrd Belardi	Honda
55	(Spain) Álex Palou R	Dale Coyne Racing with Team Goh	Honda
59	(United Kingdom) Max Chilton	Carlin	Chevrolet
60	(United Kingdom) Jack Harvey	Meyer Shank Racing with Andretti Technologies	Honda
66	(Spain) Fernando Alonso	Arrow McLaren SP	Chevrolet
67	(United States) J. R. Hildebrand	Dreyer & Reinbold Racing	Chevrolet
81	(United Kingdom) Ben Hanley	DragonSpeed	Chevrolet
88	(United States) Colton Herta	Andretti Harding Steinbrenner Autosport	Honda
98	(United States) Marco Andretti	Andretti-Herta Autosport w/ Marco Andretti & Curb-Agajanian	Honda

- W Former Indianapolis 500 Winner
- R Indianapolis 500 Rookie

== Testing and Rookie Orientation ==
=== Aeroscreen test – October 2019 ===
The series conducted an official evaluation test on October 2, 2019, at the Indianapolis Motor Speedway. Two teams tested the new aeroscreen developed by Red Bull Advanced Technologies. The cockpit safety device is scheduled to be implemented for the 2020 season. Scott Dixon and Will Power collectively drove more than 600 miles' (1,000 km) worth of laps, and the test yielded mostly positive results.

Testing – Participants
Driver	Team	Engine
(New Zealand) Scott Dixon	Chip Ganassi Racing	Honda
(Australia) Will Power	Team Penske	Chevrolet

=== Oval rookie test – February 14 ===
Four IndyCar rookies took part in an oval acclimation test at Texas Motor Speedway on February 14. Oliver Askew, Álex Palou, Rinus VeeKay, and Scott McLaughlin took part in the test, which was conducted by IndyCar officials. The test provided the drivers with high-speed oval experience prior to the start of the Rookie Orientation Program. Veterans Josef Newgarden and Ed Carpenter also took laps, doing further evaluations of the new aeroscreens. Cold temperatures delayed the start of the test, but a total of five hours of track time was available. No incidents were reported.

=== Open test ===
A full field open test was scheduled for Thursday, April 30. However, the test was cancelled due to the COVID-19 pandemic. When the Indianapolis 500 was later rescheduled for August 23, no testing time (open test or private testing) was made available before practice was to begin on August 12. The original date of the race would have made it the first oval track event of the 2020 season. With the rescheduled date, the race was now the fourth of six oval races, as well as the second superspeedway race, Texas being the first. This was the first time since 2010 (Kansas) that there was a superspeedway race held prior to the Indianapolis 500.

During the week leading up to the originally scheduled race day, Simon Pagenaud and Alexander Rossi took some demonstration laps for the NBC Sports special "Back Home Again" which aired on May 24. It marked the first laps both drivers had taken with the new aeroscreens; however, none of the laps were driven at racing speed.

=== Rookie Orientation / Refresher tests – Wednesday, August 12 ===
- Weather: 84 °F (29 °C), Partly cloudy
- Summary: A dedicated session for Rookie Orientation and veteran Refresher tests was held from 1 p.m. to 3 p.m. A total of five rookies took part, along with seven veterans including Helio Castroneves and Fernando Alonso. The rookie test consisted of three phases. The first phase was ten laps at 210–215 mph (338–346 km/h), the second segment was ten laps at 210–215 mph (338–346 km/h), and the third phase was ten laps over 215 mph (346 km/h). The refresher test consisted of phases 2 and 3 only. Four of the five rookies passed all three phases during the session: Oliver Askew, Patricio O'Ward, Álex Palou, and Rinus VeeKay. Dalton Kellett passed two phases, then completed the third phase later in the day. All seven veteran drivers who participated in the session passed their refresher tests. Race veteran Ben Hanley, who did not take to the track Wednesday, will be required to pass the refresher test on Thursday. Rinus VeeKay was the fastest rookie of the session, while Helio Castroneves was the fastest veteran of the session. No incidents were reported.

Top Practice Speeds
Pos	No.	Driver	Team	Engine	Speed
1	21	(Netherlands) Rinus VeeKay R	Ed Carpenter Racing	Chevrolet	221.318
2	55	(Spain) Álex Palou R	Dale Coyne Racing with Team Goh	Honda	219.876
3	3	(Brazil) Helio Castroneves	Team Penske	Chevrolet	219.274
OFFICIAL REPORT

== Practice ==
=== Opening day Practice – Wednesday, August 12 ===
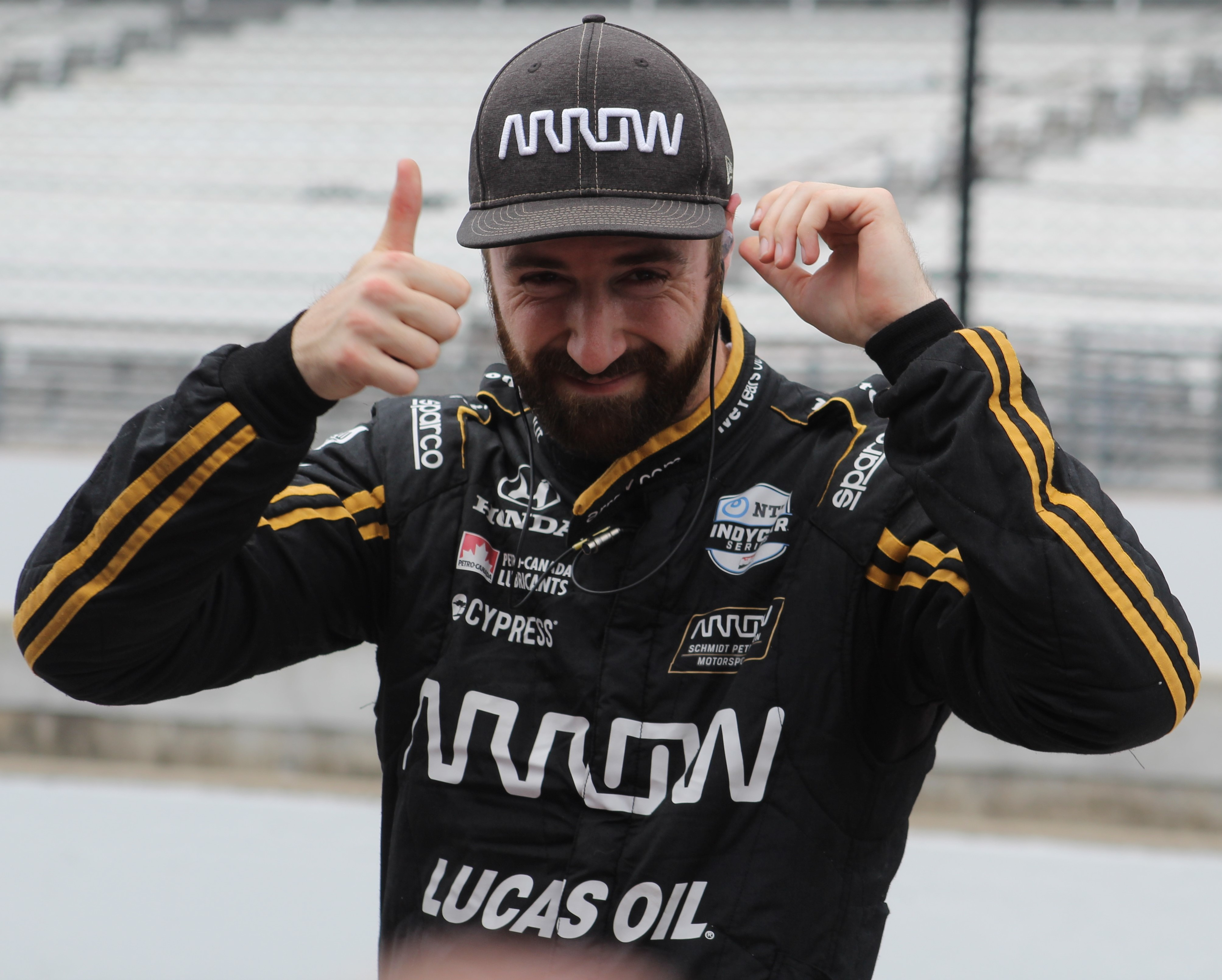
James Hinchcliffe led the practice chart on opening day.

- Weather: 84 °F (29 °C), mostly cloudy
- Summary: 1963 Indianapolis 500 winner Parnelli Jones celebrated his 87th birthday by waving the ceremonial green flag from his home in Rolling Hills, California. A total of 32 drivers took practice laps over three sessions. The first session from 11 a.m. to 1 p.m. was reserved for veteran drivers active in the 2020 IndyCar season. Scott Dixon turned the fastest lap of the morning session at 224.047 mph (360.569 km/h). After a break for the Rookie Orientation/Refresher session, general practice resumed from 3 p.m. to 5:30 p.m. James Hinchcliffe set the fastest lap of the day at 224.526 mph (361.340 km/h), leading Andretti Autosport, which had three of the top four speeds for the afternoon. Alexander Rossi had the fastest "no-tow" lap of the day at 221.952 mph (357.197 km/h). No incidents were reported, except for Charlie Kimball who barely white-walled the outside wall at the entrance of turn two. Marco Andretti brought out an early yellow for a tow-in after stalling in turn four, but he was able to return to the track shortly after. The only car that did not take laps during the scheduled sessions was Ben Hanley. After the close of practice, officials provided Hanley with about 35 minutes of solo track time to work on his refresher test.

Top Practice Speeds
Pos	No.	Driver	Team	Engine	Speed
1	29	(Canada) James Hinchcliffe	Andretti Autosport	Honda	224.526
2	98	(United States) Marco Andretti	Andretti-Herta Autosport w/ Marco Andretti & Curb-Agajanian	Honda	224.345
3	9	(New Zealand) Scott Dixon	Chip Ganassi Racing	Honda	224.047
OFFICIAL REPORT

=== Practice – Thursday, August 13 ===
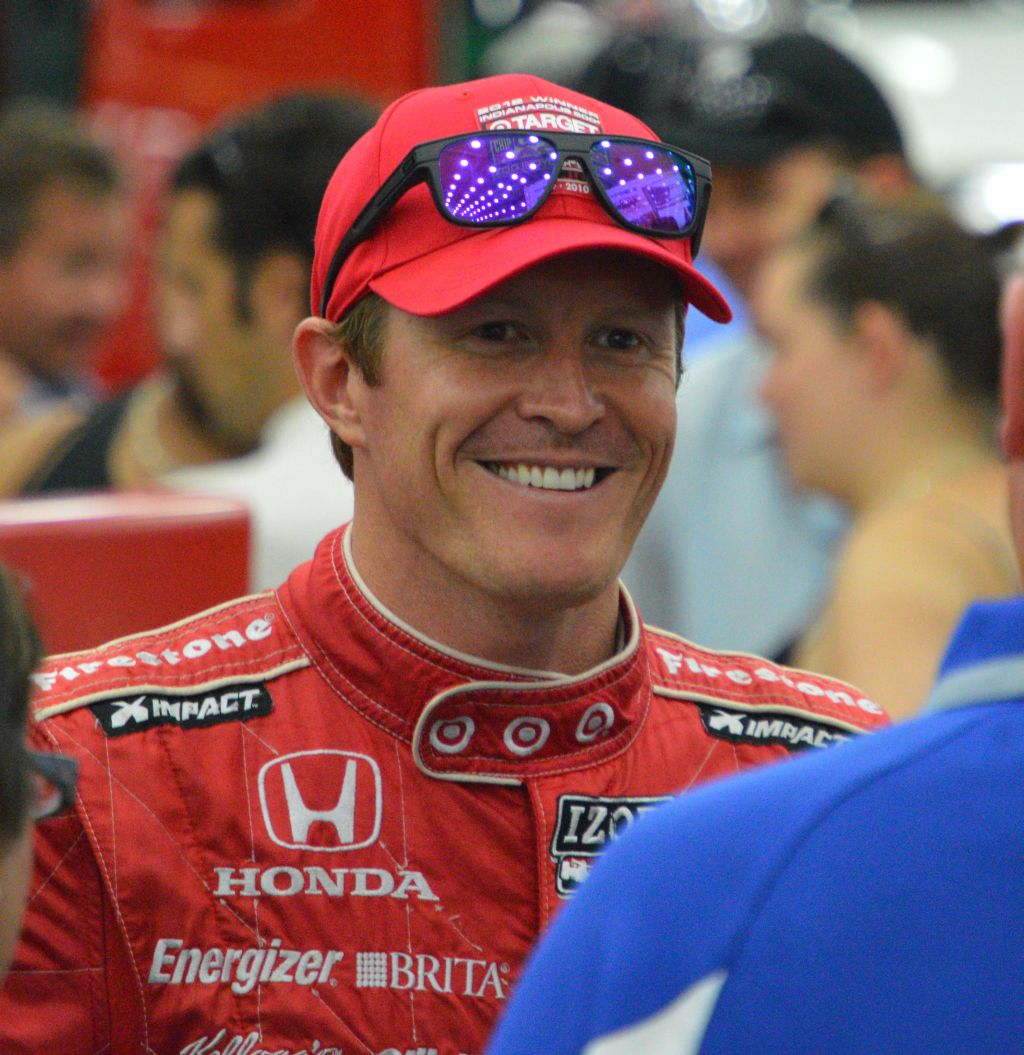
Scott Dixon led the speed chart on day two.

- Weather: 85 °F (29 °C), mostly cloudy
- Summary: The second day of practice saw the first major incident of the week. At 4:40 p.m., Fernando Alonso came through turn four, but dipped too low and the left side wheels made contact with the concrete curbing below the white line. Alonso lost control and smacked the outside wall exiting turn four, then spun to a stop at the north end of the pit lane. Alonso climbed out uninjured, and the car suffered moderate damage. Takuma Sato (225.693 mph) set a fast lap early in the day, and it held up until the final fifteen minutes. Late in the session, Scott Dixon took over the top speed for the day with a lap of 226.102 mph in fairly hot conditions. The fastest "no-tow" lap of the day belonged to Jack Harvey at 222.123 mph. For the second day in a row, teams were working actively on various downforce settings, acclimating to the unfamiliar hot August conditions. Some teams were also working out various issues and complications with the new cockpit cooling hoses. A total of 32 cars took practice laps, with Ben Hanley again not able to practice as he had not completed his mandatory Refresher test. Hanley did pass one phase of the Refresher test during a solo session after the conclusion of practice.

Top Practice Speeds
Pos	No.	Driver	Team	Engine	Speed
1	9	(New Zealand) Scott Dixon	Chip Ganassi Racing	Honda	226.102
2	30	(Japan) Takuma Sato	Rahal Letterman Lanigan Racing	Honda	225.693
3	98	(United States) Marco Andretti	Andretti-Herta Autosport w/ Marco Andretti & Curb-Agajanian	Honda	225.249
OFFICIAL REPORT

=== Fast Friday Practice – Friday, August 14 ===
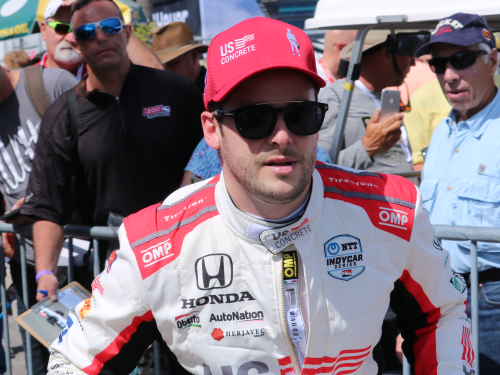
Marco Andretti led the speed chart on "Fast Friday"

- Weather: 86 °F (30 °C), partly cloudy
- Summary: Marco Andretti set the fastest lap during "Fast Friday" practice at 233.491 mph (375.767 km/h), the fastest practice lap at Indy since 1996. Andretti's teammate Ryan Hunter-Reay was also near the top of the speed chart, turning in the fastest "no-tow" lap (232.124 mph (373.567 km/h)). Andretti set the fast time early in the day, before the hot and sunny conditions of the afternoon. Honda-powered machines took nine of the top ten spots, with Conor Daly the only Chevrolet in the top ten. Daly was the fastest Chevy of the day; however, his speed was achieved with a tow. Most teams spent the day doing qualifying simulations. In order to avoid placing their cars in a tow, most teams actively avoided going out while others cars were on the track, or at least made certain there was adequate spacing between cars (≈10 seconds or more). Scott Dixon was 45 minutes late getting onto the track after his car stalled multiple times with electrical issues. The team was able to make corrections and he posted the third-best lap of the day. All 33 cars took laps at speed, and no incidents were reported. After the conclusion of practice, the traditional qualifying draw was held. Graham Rahal selected the coveted first spot in the qualifying line with his teammate Takuma Sato second.

Top Practice Speeds
Pos	No.	Driver	Team	Engine	Speed
1	98	(United States) Marco Andretti	Andretti-Herta Autosport w/ Marco Andretti & Curb-Agajanian	Honda	233.491
2	47	(United States) Conor Daly	Ed Carpenter Racing	Chevrolet	232.337
3	9	(New Zealand) Scott Dixon	Chip Ganassi Racing	Honda	232.290
OFFICIAL REPORT

== Time trials ==
=== First day – Saturday, August 15 ===
- Weather: 88 °F (31 °C), partly cloudy.
- Summary: Time trials on Saturday determined the nine drivers moving on to the Fast Nine Shootout on Sunday and the final starting positions for spots 10–33. The day was dominated by Andretti Autosport, who claimed the top four positions. The fastest of the team was Marco Andretti with a four-lap average at 231.351 mph (372.323 km/h), while teammate Ryan Hunter-Reay came second at 231.330 mph (372.290 km/h). Scott Dixon turned the fastest single lap of the day at 232.356 mph (373.941 km/h), but waved off the run. He reverted to his four-lap average set earlier in the day. Chevrolet-powered cars struggled during the session with only one Chevy driver, Indianapolis 500 rookie Rinus VeeKay, qualifying for the Fast Nine Shootout. Only five Chevrolets ranked in the top twenty positions. Álex Palou, another Indianapolis 500 rookie, also advanced to the Fast Nine Shootout by qualifying in seventh place. Defending winners Team Penske were unexpectedly lacking speed, with three of the team's four cars falling outside the top 20. Fernando Alonso also struggled to find pace as he managed only twenty-sixth place. No incidents occurred during the day.

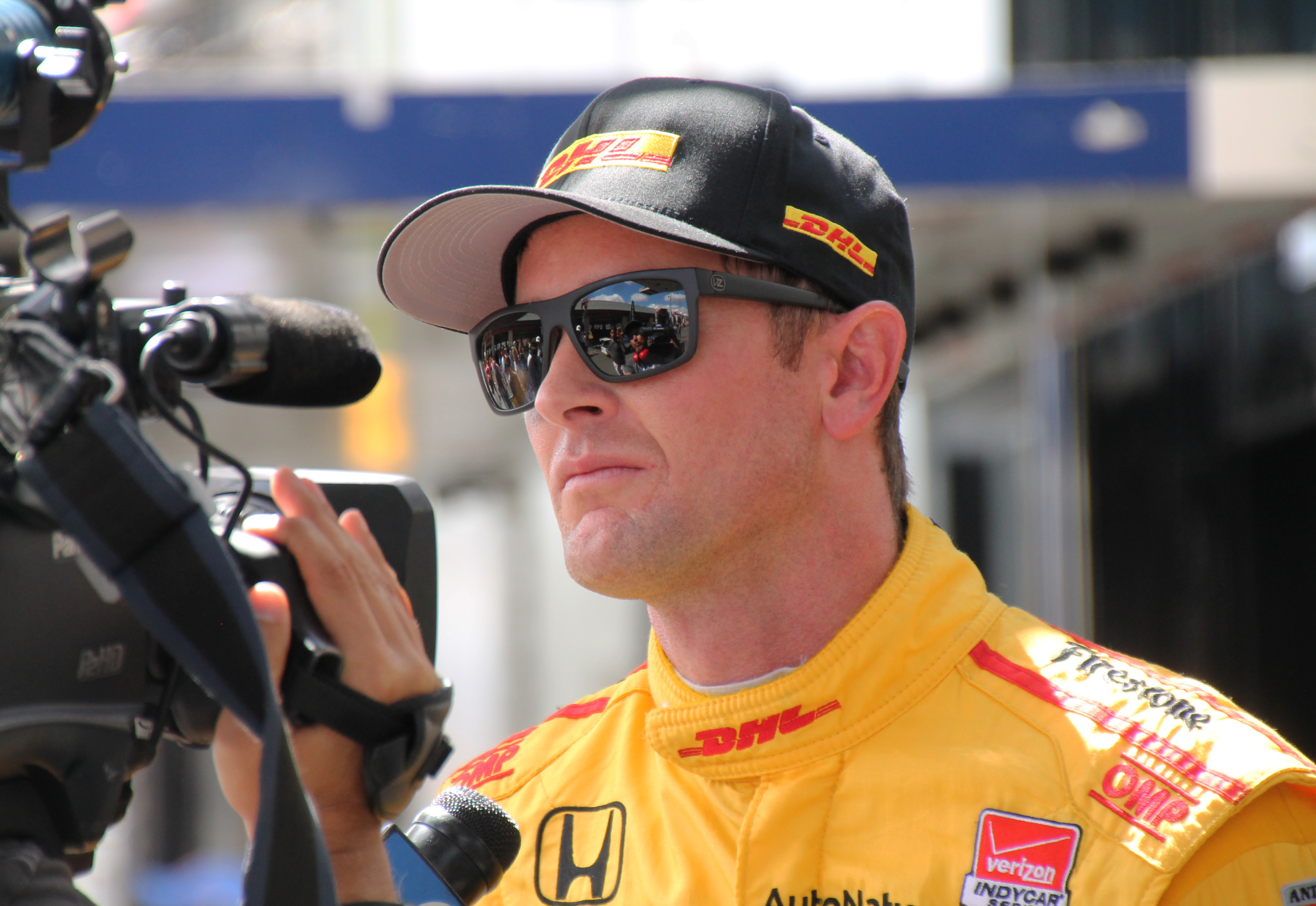
2014 winner Ryan Hunter-Reay was the second-fastest of the day.

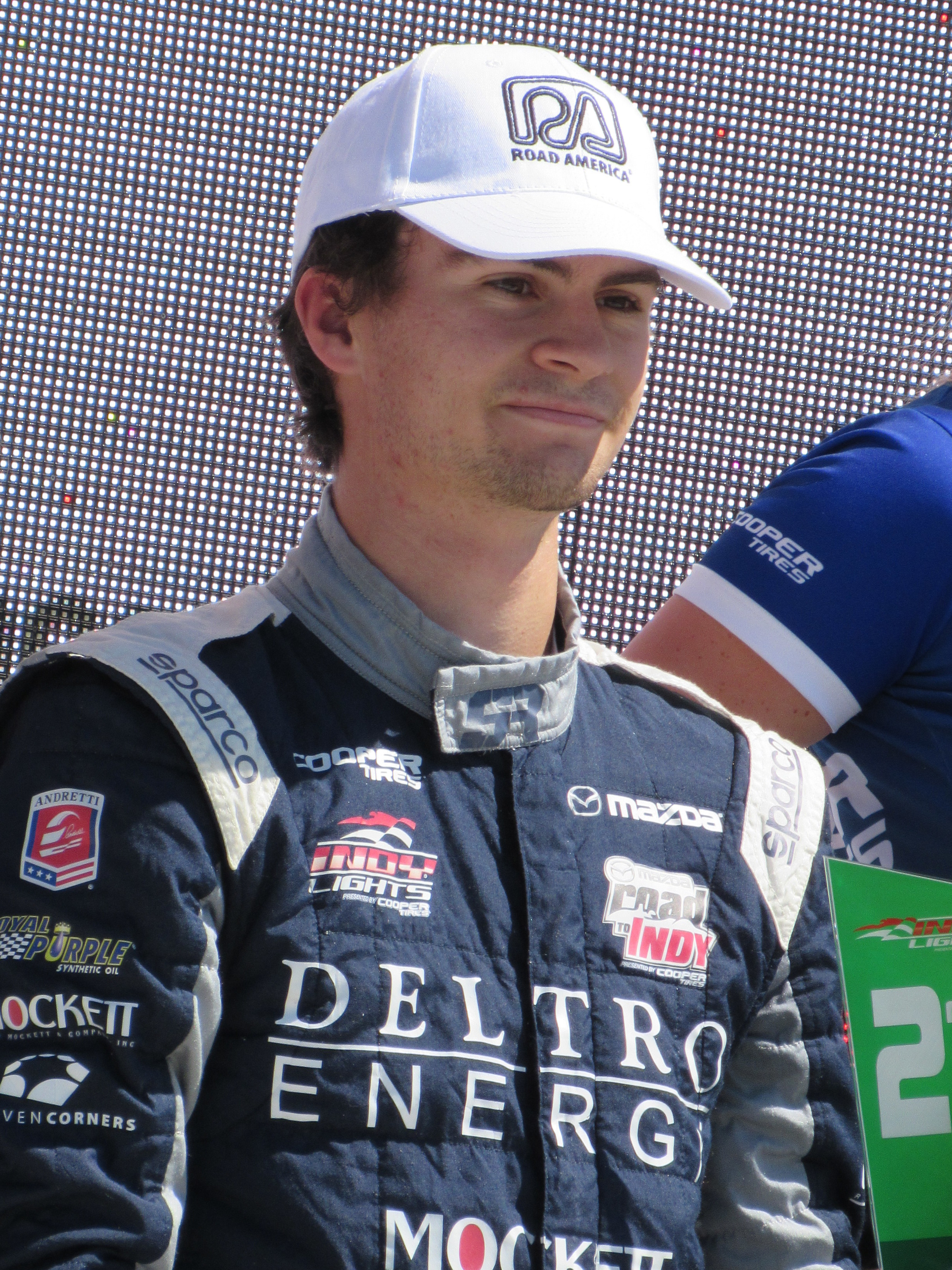
Colton Herta qualified 10th, the fastest car of the 10–33 grouping.

Pos	No.	Driver	Team	Engine	Speed
Fast Nine Qualifiers
1	98	(United States) Marco Andretti	Andretti Herta Autosport w/ Marco Andretti & Curb-Agajanian	Honda	231.351
2	28	(United States) Ryan Hunter-Reay W	Andretti Autosport	Honda	231.330
3	27	(United States) Alexander Rossi W	Andretti Autosport	Honda	231.268
4	29	(Canada) James Hinchcliffe	Andretti Autosport	Honda	231.195
5	9	(New Zealand) Scott Dixon W	Chip Ganassi Racing	Honda	231.155
6	21	(Netherlands) Rinus VeeKay R	Ed Carpenter Racing	Chevrolet	231.114
7	55	(Spain) Álex Palou R	Dale Coyne Racing w/ Team Goh	Honda	231.034
8	15	(United States) Graham Rahal	Rahal Letterman Lanigan Racing	Honda	230.822
9	30	(Japan) Takuma Sato W	Rahal Letterman Lanigan Racing	Honda	230.792
Positions 10–33
10	88	(United States) Colton Herta	Andretti Harding Steinbrenner Autosport	Honda	230.775
11	8	(Sweden) Marcus Ericsson	Chip Ganassi Racing	Honda	230.566
12	45	(United States) Spencer Pigot	Rahal Letterman Lanigan Racing	Honda	230.539
13	1	(United States) Josef Newgarden	Team Penske	Chevrolet	230.296
14	10	(Sweden) Felix Rosenqvist	Chip Ganassi Racing	Honda	230.254
15	5	(Mexico) Patricio O'Ward R	Arrow McLaren SP	Chevrolet	230.213
16	20	(United States) Ed Carpenter	Ed Carpenter Racing	Chevrolet	230.211
17	26	(United States) Zach Veach	Andretti Autosport	Honda	229.961
18	47	(United States) Conor Daly	Ed Carpenter Racing	Chevrolet	229.955
19	18	(United States) Santino Ferrucci	Dale Coyne Racing w/ Vasser-Sullivan	Honda	229.924
20	60	(United Kingdom) Jack Harvey	Meyer Shank Racing	Honda	229.861
21	7	(United States) Oliver Askew R	Arrow McLaren SP	Chevrolet	229.760
22	12	(Australia) Will Power W	Team Penske	Chevrolet	229.701
23	14	(Brazil) Tony Kanaan W	A. J. Foyt Enterprises	Chevrolet	229.154
24	41	(Canada) Dalton Kellett R	A. J. Foyt Enterprises	Chevrolet	228.880
25	22	(France) Simon Pagenaud W	Team Penske	Chevrolet	228.836
26	66	(Spain) Fernando Alonso	Arrow McLaren SP	Chevrolet	228.768
27	51	(Australia) James Davison	Dale Coyne Racing w/ Rick Ware Racing & Byrd Belardi	Honda	228.747
28	3	(Brazil) Hélio Castroneves W	Team Penske	Chevrolet	228.373
29	4	(United States) Charlie Kimball	A. J. Foyt Enterprises	Chevrolet	227.758
30	59	(United Kingdom) Max Chilton	Carlin	Chevrolet	227.303
31	24	(United States) Sage Karam	Dreyer & Reinbold Racing	Chevrolet	227.099
32	67	(United States) J. R. Hildebrand	Dreyer & Reinbold Racing	Chevrolet	226.341
33	81	(United Kingdom) Ben Hanley	DragonSpeed	Chevrolet	222.917
OFFICIAL REPORT

=== Fast Nine Shootout – Sunday, August 16 ===
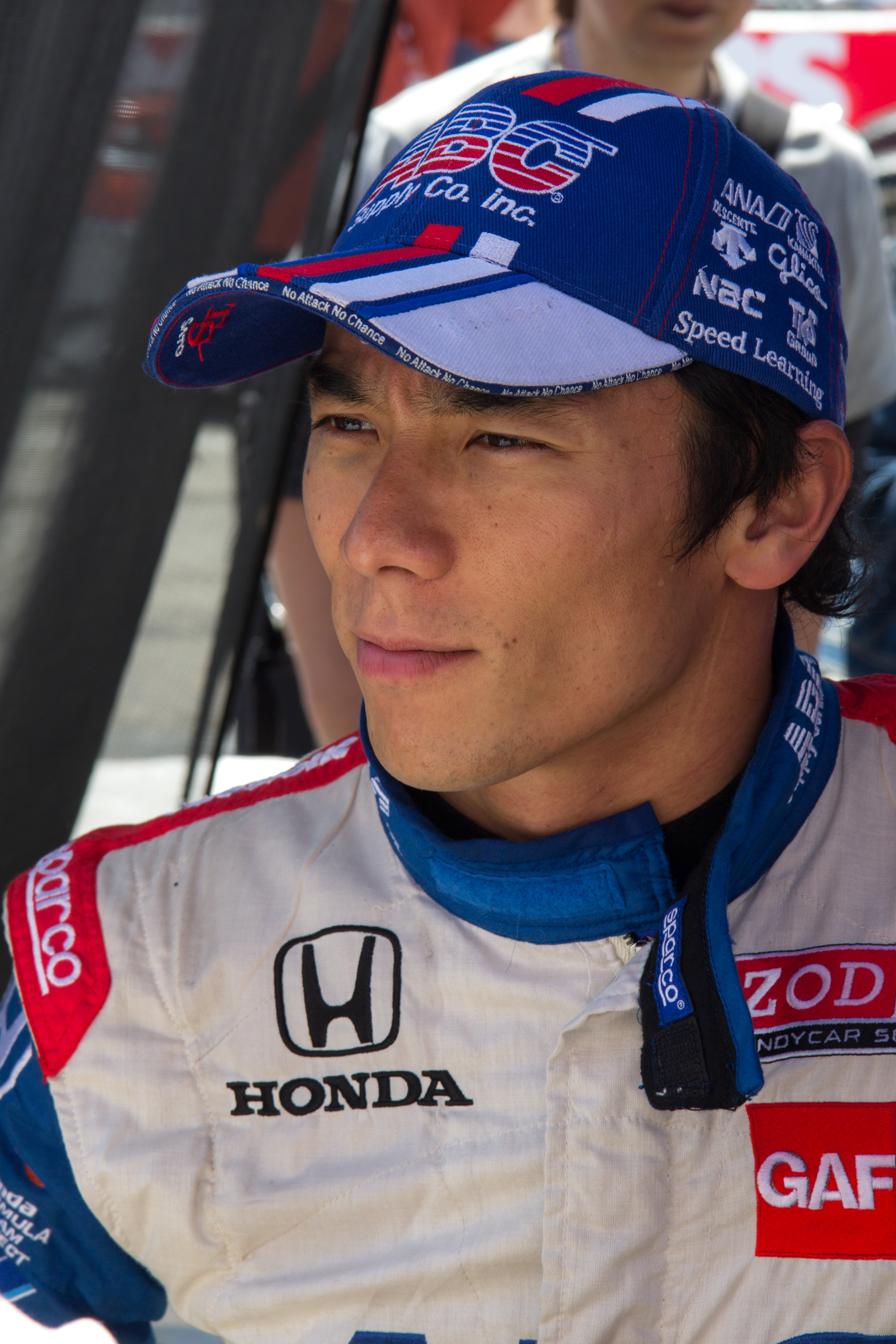
2017 winner Takuma Sato qualified for the outside of the front row.

- Weather: 81 °F (27 °C), partly cloudy with wind gusts up to 22 mph (35 km/h).
- Summary: The Fast Nine Shootout began at 1:15 p.m. eastern. Gusty winds made conditions more challenging for the drivers than the previous day, resulting in reduced speeds. Marco Andretti claimed the pole position with a four-lap average at 231.068 mph (371.868 km/h), narrowly beating out Scott Dixon's average of 231.051 mph (371.841 km/h). Andretti beat Dixon over the four-lap run by 0.0113 seconds, the third-closest margin between first and second in qualifying in the race's history. It also marked the first time since 1987 that a member of the Andretti family qualified for the pole position, when Marco's grandfather Mario performed the same feat. Takuma Sato (who ranked 9th on Saturday) was the first driver to make an attempt, and set the early pace with a 230.725 mph (371.316 km/h) average. His speed held up enough to qualify third and sit on the outside of the front row. Rinus VeeKay qualified fourth, making him both the highest qualified rookie and highest Chevrolet driver in the field. Álex Palou turned the fastest single lap of the session at 231.901 mph (373.208 km/h), but suffered large speed drop offs over subsequent laps due to a broken weightjacker, relegating him to 7th. Alexander Rossi suffered the biggest drop from Saturday to Sunday, dropping six positions. Rossi reportedly suffered handling problems as the run progressed, and dropped to 9th. The front row of Andretti, Dixon, and Sato marked the first sweep of the front row for Honda since 2011—a year in which Honda was the sole engine manufacturer.

Pos	No.	Driver	Team	Engine	Speed
Firestone Fast Nine Qualifiers
1	98	(United States) Marco Andretti	Andretti Herta Autosport w/ Marco Andretti & Curb-Agajanian	Honda	231.068
2	9	(New Zealand) Scott Dixon W	Chip Ganassi Racing	Honda	231.051
3	30	(Japan) Takuma Sato W	Rahal Letterman Lanigan Racing	Honda	230.725
4	21	(Netherlands) Rinus VeeKay R	Ed Carpenter Racing	Chevrolet	230.704
5	28	(United States) Ryan Hunter-Reay W	Andretti Autosport	Honda	230.648
6	29	(Canada) James Hinchcliffe	Andretti Autosport	Honda	229.870
7	55	(Spain) Álex Palou R	Dale Coyne Racing w/ Team Goh	Honda	229.676
8	15	(United States) Graham Rahal	Rahal Letterman Lanigan Racing	Honda	229.380
9	27	(United States) Alexander Rossi W	Andretti Autosport	Honda	229.234
OFFICIAL REPORT

== Post-qualifying practice ==
=== Sunday, August 16 ===
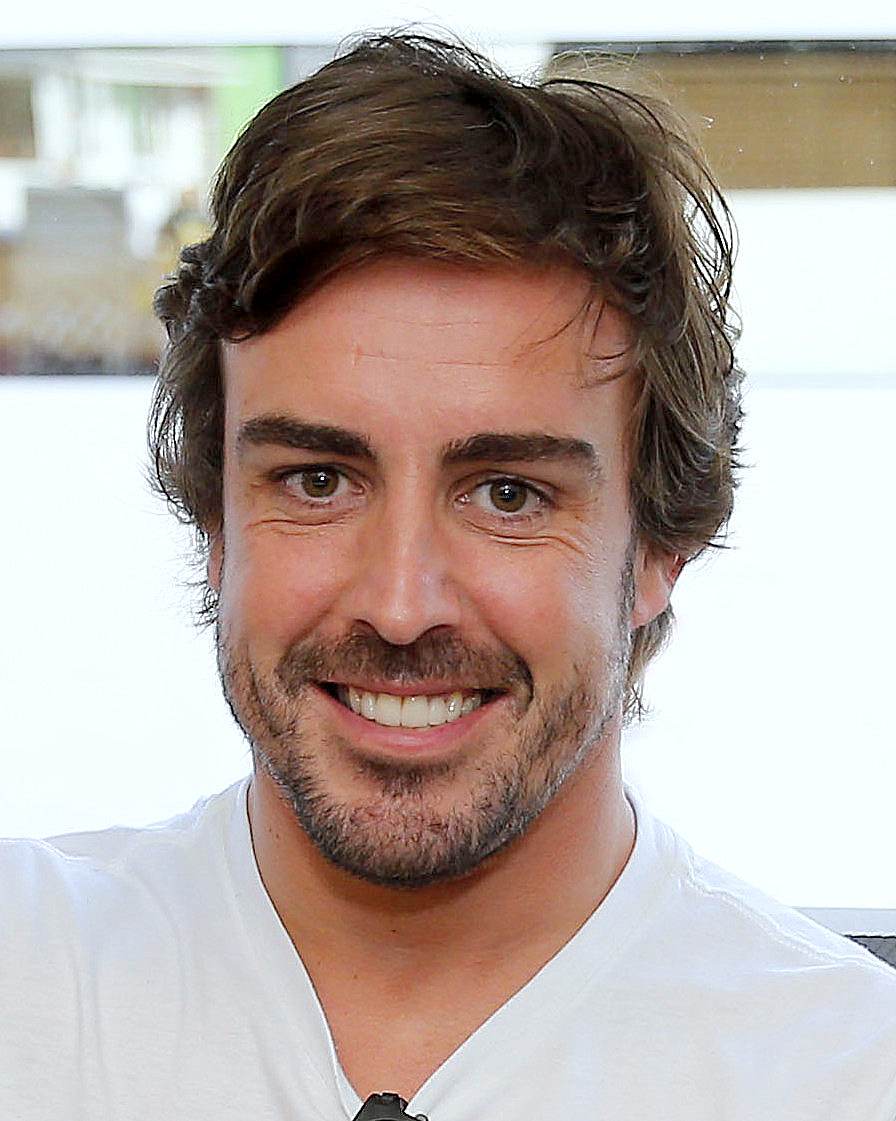
Fernando Alonso suffered a crash on Thursday, followed by a spin in the pits on Sunday.

- Weather: 84 °F (29 °C), partly cloudy with wind gusts up to 22 mph (35 km/h).
- Summary: A three-hour practice session began at 3:30 p.m. after the conclusion of the Fast Nine Shootout. Teams reverted the cars to race turbocharger boost settings and spent the session running in traffic to simulate race day conditions. At 4:11 p.m., Scott Dixon lost control of his car in turn four, making light contact with the outside wall before skidding across the track and making further contact with the pit wall. However, the car was repaired before the end of session, and Dixon returned to the track to set the third-fastest time of the session. Fernando Alonso suffered a minor incident when he spun leaving his pit box late in the session, but his car was undamaged. Marco Andretti was the fastest on the session, lapping at 224.122 mph (360.689 km/h). Hélio Castroneves appeared in the top three on the speed charts for the first time of the event, running a lap at 224.067 mph (360.601 km/h).

Top Practice Speeds
Pos	No.	Driver	Team	Engine	Speed
1	98	(United States) Marco Andretti	Andretti Herta Autosport w/ Marco Andretti & Curb-Agajanian	Honda	224.122
2	3	(Brazil) Hélio Castroneves	Team Penske	Chevrolet	224.067
3	9	(New Zealand) Scott Dixon	Chip Ganassi Racing	Honda	223.686
OFFICIAL REPORT

=== Carb Day – Friday, August 21 ===
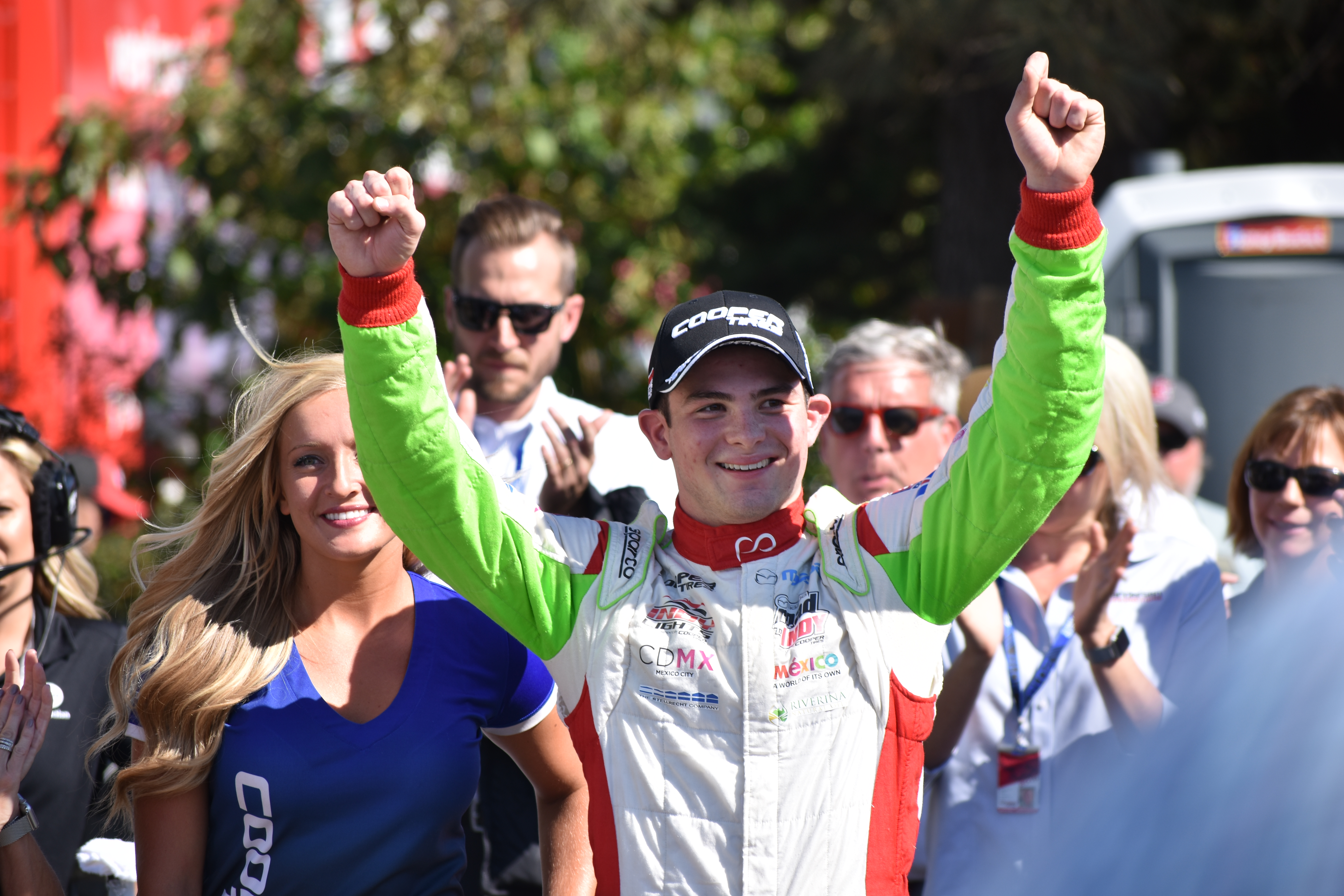
Patricio O'Ward led the speed chart on Carb Day.

- Weather: 86 °F (30 °C), sunny, fair
- Summary: The traditional Carb Day final practice was held Friday, with the track available for two hours, up from one hour in the past several years. Race rookie Patricio O'Ward set the fastest lap of the day. Polesitter Marco Andretti ranked only 28th in the session. No major incidents were reported, although Sage Karam lightly brushed the wall in turn four. Rinus VeeKay was credited with the fastest "no-tow" speed at 220.189 mph (354.360 km/h). All 33 qualified cars took to the track, with Marcus Ericsson leading the pack with 105 laps. Due to the COVID-19 pandemic, the traditional Pit Stop Challenge was not held, and the Carb Day concert was cancelled as well.

Top Practice Speeds
Pos	No.	Driver	Team	Engine	Speed
1	5	(Mexico) Patricio O'Ward R	Arrow McLaren SP	Chevrolet	225.355
2	9	(New Zealand) Scott Dixon	Chip Ganassi Racing	Honda	224.646
3	27	(United States) Alexander Rossi	Andretti Autosport	Honda	224.599
OFFICIAL REPORT

== Starting grid ==
Row	Inside		Middle		Outside	
1	98	(United States) Marco Andretti	9	(New Zealand) Scott Dixon W	30	(Japan) Takuma Sato W
2	21	(Netherlands) Rinus VeeKay R	28	(United States) Ryan Hunter-Reay W	29	(Canada) James Hinchcliffe
3	55	(Spain) Álex Palou R	15	(United States) Graham Rahal	27	(United States) Alexander Rossi W
4	88	(United States) Colton Herta	8	(Sweden) Marcus Ericsson	45	(United States) Spencer Pigot
5	1	(United States) Josef Newgarden	10	(Sweden) Felix Rosenqvist	5	(Mexico) Patricio O'Ward R
6	20	(United States) Ed Carpenter	26	(United States) Zach Veach	47	(United States) Conor Daly
7	18	(United States) Santino Ferrucci	60	(United Kingdom) Jack Harvey	7	(United States) Oliver Askew R
8	12	(Australia) Will Power W	14	(Brazil) Tony Kanaan W	41	(Canada) Dalton Kellett R
9	22	(France) Simon Pagenaud W	66	(Spain) Fernando Alonso	51	(Australia) James Davison
10	3	(Brazil) Hélio Castroneves W	4	(United States) Charlie Kimball	59	(United Kingdom) Max Chilton
11	24	(United States) Sage Karam	67	(United States) J. R. Hildebrand	81	(United Kingdom) Ben Hanley

R Indianapolis 500 rookie
W Indianapolis 500 winner

== Race summary ==
=== First half ===
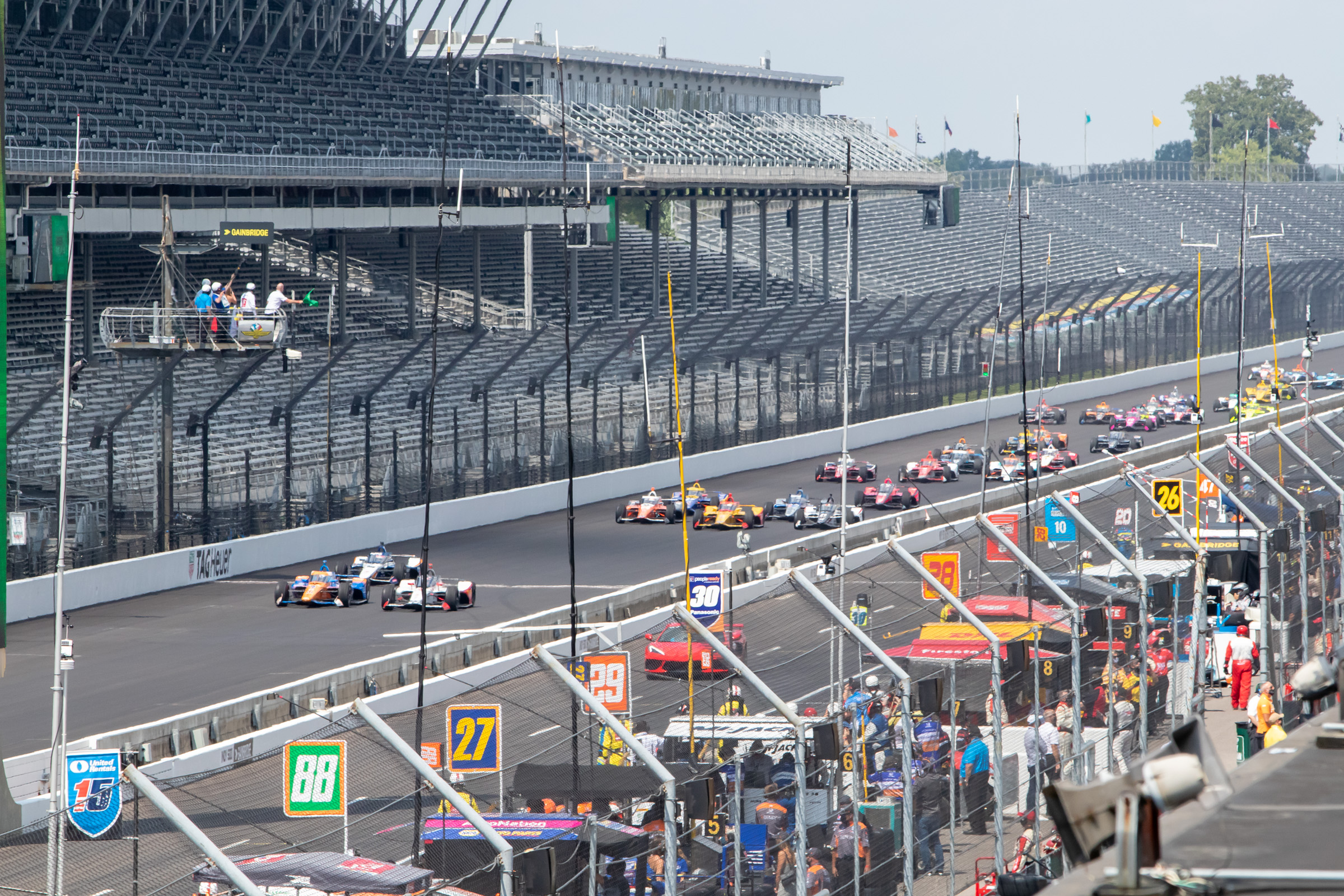
The 2020 Indianapolis 500 starts in front of empty grandstands. Spectators were not allowed due to the Covid Pandemic.

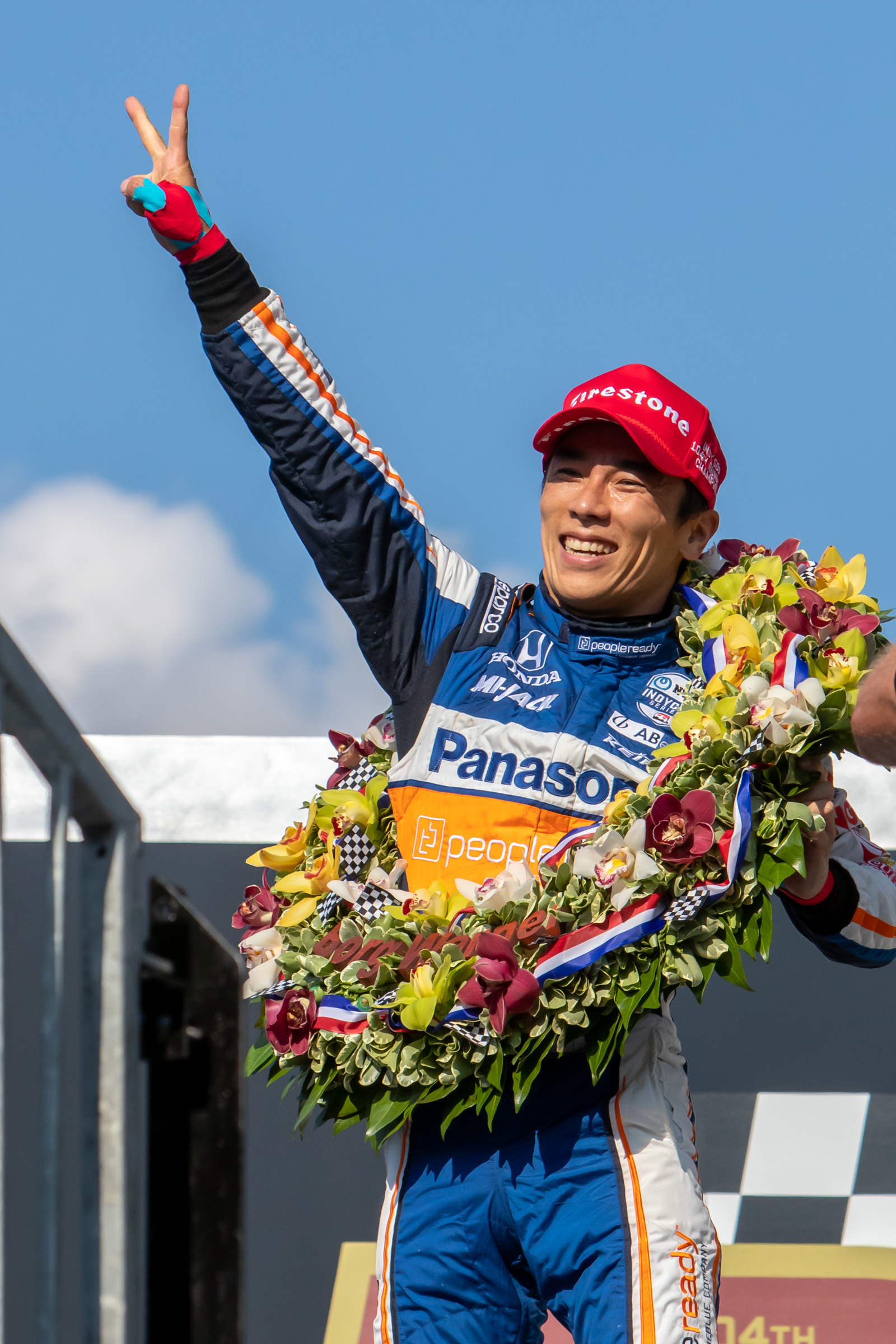
2017 Indianapolis 500 winner Takuma Sato won his second Indianapolis 500

Race day saw high temperatures of 85 °F (29 °C) and partly cloudy skies throughout.

The race began with Scott Dixon immediately pulling into the lead, with pole sitter Marco Andretti being shuffled to third by the end of the lap. Further back in the field, Ed Carpenter impacted the wall in the south short chute, requiring Carpenter to repair damage to the suspension. Carpenter alleged he was forced into the wall by Zach Veach, but IndyCar officials took no action. The first caution of the day came only 6 laps into the race, when James Davison suffered a brake issue that caused the entire right front wheel assembly to catch fire and spray debris along the backstretch. Davison brought the flaming car to a halt just before pit entrance and exited the car safely. Davison later indicated that the brake master cylinder locked on the car, causing the brakes to be stuck on and generate large amounts of heat, ultimately leading to the magnesium wheels catching fire. Racing resumed at lap 12, with Dixon and Takuma Sato, while Ryan Hunter-Reay, James Hinchcliffe, and Alexander Rossi completed the top 5. The second caution of the race came only a short time later at lap 25, when Marcus Ericsson lost control of his car in turn one and crashed into the outside wall then slid until part way through turn 2. Ericsson was uninjured, but was out of the race. During the caution, nearly all of the front running cars pitted, with Dixon, Sato, and Andretti emerging first. Cars that had pitted during the first caution cycled to the front of the field, meaning that rookie Oliver Askew now led the race ahead of defending winner Simon Pagenaud and 2018 winner Will Power.

Racing resumed again at lap 31, with Pagenaud taking the lead from Askew entering turn 1. Behind, those that pitted began to work their way up through the field, with Dixon moving up to 6th and Alexander Rossi moving up several spots to 7th. At lap 46, those who had stayed out at the previous caution began to pit, and Dixon reclaimed the lead with Rossi second. Pit stops on the majority strategy began at roughly lap 60, with Dixon retaining his lead. Rossi lost several seconds after a late call to pit lane resulted in him missing pit lane altogether and being forced to take another lap. Rinus VeeKay, who had been running in the top 5, slid through his pit stall and hit one of his crew members, resulting in a stop and hold penalty. Sage Karam also suffered issues after coming into the pits too fast and sliding completely past his pit box.

By lap 75, Dixon had pulled a gap of over 7 seconds to Askew who ran second and over 10 seconds to Rossi in third. However, the lead was erased by the race's third caution at lap 84, when Dalton Kellett slid wide into the outside wall in turn 3 after a failed attempt to pass Ben Hanley. Most of the field pitted during this sequence, though the off-strategy runners came in later and emerged at the end of the field. Following stops, the running order ran Dixon, Sato, Rossi, Patricio O'Ward, and Josef Newgarden. The restart from the third caution came at lap 91, but another incident occurred before the cars reached the start/finish line. Conor Daly lost control of his car in turn 4 and spun in front of traffic. Behind him, Oliver Askew spun in avoidance and crashed heavily into the inside wall before ricocheting back towards the track and impacting Daly's car. Askew suffered a concussion from the impact, but was released from the infield care center with no symptoms or diagnosis, initially thought to have just been winded. Askew would later be forced to miss the Harvest Grand Prix later in the year after complaining of balance and coordination issues and being declared medically unfit by IndyCar's medical team.

=== Second half ===
Racing resumed at lap 100 with Alexander Rossi moving past Takuma Sato to take second place behind Scott Dixon. Dixon and Rossi began exchanging the lead back and forth in an effort to keep momentum up and break away from Sato and Patricio O'Ward behind them, but were only marginally successful in doing so. At lap 121, the fifth caution of the day interrupted their battle, as Álex Palou lost control of his car in turn 1 and crashed into the outside wall before spinning and skidding to a stop at the entrance of turn 2. During the caution most of the field pitted, with Dixon emerging ahead again. Behind, Rossi was released into the path of Sato, leading to minor contact and Sato having to take evasive action to avoid crashing heavily into Rossi's car. Rossi was assessed a penalty for an unsafe release and was moved to the end of the field for the following restart. Felix Rosenqvist inherited the lead by being the only driver not to pit, while Dixon, O'Ward, Sato, and Graham Rahal sat behind him.

Green flag conditions returned at lap 130. Rosenqvist lead for a few laps before teammate Dixon passed him at lap 132. Behind him, Sato and Rahal both moved past O'Ward, giving them second and third positions once Rosenqvist finally pitted. At lap 144, the sixth caution of the day came, this time for Rossi, who lost control of his car in turn 2 and impacted the outside wall. Racing resumed at lap 154 with Dixon still ahead of Sato. On lap 157, Sato passed Dixon to take the lead for the first time of the race, just before final pit stops.

==== Finish ====
The final round of pit stops came around lap 168. After the pit stops Dixon emerged ahead of Sato once again, with Rahal running in third. Zach Veach and Max Chilton remained on track in front of them for several laps hoping for a caution to extend their fuel, but eventually peeled off and pitted. On lap 172, Sato passed Dixon again, effectively making him the leader. This became the actual lead at lap 186 after Veach's pit stop. With 19 laps to go, Sato came under increasing pressure from Dixon after Dixon's team indicated that fuel millage concerns were no longer an issue. Despite several attempts, Dixon was unable to get around Sato before they reached lapped traffic, which allowed Sato to gap Dixon.

As the leaders were going through turn three on lap 196, the seventh and final caution of the race came. Spencer Pigot lost control exiting turn 4, spun, and made heavy contact with the pit lane attenuator, causing severe damage to both the car and the wall separating pit lane from the front straightaway. A team of safety workers and medical staff extracted Pigot from the heavily damaged vehicle and laid him down on his back on front straightway during the closing laps for a cursory medical examination before ordering him ambulanced to Methodist Hospital. He was discharged a few hours later without serious injury.

With now less than three laps remaining, significant damage to the pit wall (which would require a lengthy repair), and with safety crews tending to the scene, the officials decided there was insufficient time to red flag the race. In some previous years, a late-race red flag had been utilized to provide an opportunity for a green flag finish. The race ended under caution, with Takuma Sato taking his second victory ahead of Scott Dixon and Graham Rahal. Santino Ferrucci and Josef Newgarden progressed from deep on the starting grid to round out the top 5 positions. Patricio O'Ward finished in sixth position, securing Rookie of the Year honors in the process.

== Box score ==
Finish	No.	Driver	Team	Chassis	Engine	Laps	Status	Pit Stops	Grid	Pts.^{1}
1	30	(Japan) Takuma Sato W	Rahal Letterman Lanigan Racing	Dallara UAK18	Honda	200	157.824 mph	5	3	108
2	9	(New Zealand) Scott Dixon W	Chip Ganassi Racing	Dallara UAK18	Honda	200	+0.057	5	2	91
3	15	(United States) Graham Rahal	Rahal Letterman Lanigan Racing	Dallara UAK18	Honda	200	+0.095	5	8	72
4	18	(United States) Santino Ferrucci	Dale Coyne Racing w/ Vasser-Sullivan	Dallara UAK18	Honda	200	+0.392	5	19	65
5	1	(United States) Josef Newgarden	Team Penske	Dallara UAK18	Chevrolet	200	+1.661	5	13	60
6	5	(Mexico) Pato O'Ward R	Arrow McLaren SP	Dallara UAK18	Chevrolet	200	+3.249	5	15	56
7	29	(Canada) James Hinchcliffe	Andretti Autosport	Dallara UAK18	Honda	200	+4.269	5	6	57
8	88	(United States) Colton Herta	Andretti Harding Steinbrenner Autosport	Dallara UAK18	Honda	200	+5.191	5	10	49
9	60	(United Kingdom) Jack Harvey	Meyer Shank Racing	Dallara UAK18	Honda	200	+6.813	5	20	44
10	28	(United States) Ryan Hunter-Reay W	Andretti Autosport	Dallara UAK18	Honda	200	+7.961	5	5	45
11	3	(Brazil) Hélio Castroneves W	Team Penske	Dallara UAK18	Chevrolet	200	+10.314	7	28	38
12	10	(Sweden) Felix Rosenqvist	Chip Ganassi Racing	Dallara UAK18	Honda	200	+13.966	6	14	37
13	98	(United States) Marco Andretti	Andretti Herta Autosport w/ Marco Andretti & Curb-Agajanian	Dallara UAK18	Honda	200	+16.065	5	1	43
14	12	(Australia) Will Power W	Team Penske	Dallara UAK18	Chevrolet	200	+17.643	6	22	33
15	26	(United States) Zach Veach	Andretti Autosport	Dallara UAK18	Honda	200	+19.396	6	17	31
16	67	(United States) J. R. Hildebrand	Dreyer & Reinbold Racing	Dallara UAK18	Chevrolet	200	+20.234	8	32	28
17	59	(United Kingdom) Max Chilton	Carlin	Dallara UAK18	Chevrolet	200	+21.491	9	30	26
18	4	(United States) Charlie Kimball	A. J. Foyt Enterprises	Dallara UAK18	Chevrolet	200	+24.701	6	29	24
19	14	(Brazil) Tony Kanaan W	A. J. Foyt Enterprises	Dallara UAK18	Chevrolet	199	-1 Lap	5	23	22
20	21	(Netherlands) Rinus VeeKay R	Ed Carpenter Racing	Dallara UAK18	Chevrolet	199	-1 Lap	7	4	26
21	66	(Spain) Fernando Alonso	Arrow McLaren SP	Dallara UAK18	Chevrolet	199	-1 Lap	7	26	18
22	22	(France) Simon Pagenaud W	Team Penske	Dallara UAK18	Chevrolet	198	-2 Laps	9	25	17
23	81	(United Kingdom) Ben Hanley	DragonSpeed	Dallara UAK18	Chevrolet	198	-2 Laps	9	33	14
24	24	(United States) Sage Karam	Dreyer & Reinbold Racing	Dallara UAK18	Chevrolet	198	-2 Laps	8	31	12
25	45	(United States) Spencer Pigot	Rahal Letterman Lanigan Racing	Dallara UAK18	Honda	194	Crash	6	12	10
26	20	(United States) Ed Carpenter	Ed Carpenter Racing	Dallara UAK18	Chevrolet	187	-13 Laps	8	16	10
27	27	(United States) Alexander Rossi W	Andretti Autosport	Dallara UAK18	Honda	143	Crash	4	9	12
28	55	(Spain) Álex Palou R	Dale Coyne Racing w/ Team Goh	Dallara UAK18	Honda	121	Crash	3	7	13
29	47	(United States) Conor Daly	Ed Carpenter Racing	Dallara UAK18	Chevrolet	91	Crash	3	18	10
30	7	(United States) Oliver Askew R	Arrow McLaren SP	Dallara UAK18	Chevrolet	91	Crash	4	21	11
31	41	(Canada) Dalton Kellett R	A. J. Foyt Enterprises	Dallara UAK18	Chevrolet	82	Crash	2	24	10
32	8	(Sweden) Marcus Ericsson	Chip Ganassi Racing	Dallara UAK18	Honda	24	Crash	0	11	10
33	51	(Australia) James Davison	Dale Coyne Racing w/ Rick Ware Racing & Byrd Belardi	Dallara UAK18	Honda	4	Mechanical	0	27	10
OFFICIAL BOX SCORE

W Former Indianapolis 500 winner

R Indianapolis 500 Rookie

All entrants utilized Firestone tires.

^{1} Points include qualification points from time trials, 1 point for leading a lap, and 2 points for most laps led.

=== Race statistics ===
Lap Leaders
Laps	Leader
1–26	Scott Dixon
27–30	Oliver Askew
31–44	Simon Pagenaud
45–46	Will Power
47–63	Scott Dixon
64	Colton Herta
65–101	Scott Dixon
102–105	Alexander Rossi
106	Scott Dixon
107–114	Alexander Rossi
115–117	Scott Dixon
118–120	Alexander Rossi
121	Scott Dixon
122–123	Alexander Rossi
124–131	Felix Rosenqvist
132–156	Scott Dixon
157–167	Takuma Sato
168	Scott Dixon
169	Santino Ferrucci
170	James Hinchcliffe
171–184	Zach Veach
185–200	Takuma Sato

Total laps led
Driver	Laps
Scott Dixon	111
Takuma Sato	27
Alexander Rossi	17
Zach Veach	14
Simon Pagenaud	14
Felix Rosenqvist	8
Oliver Askew	4
Will Power	2
Santino Ferrucci	1
Colton Herta	1
James Hinchcliffe	1

Cautions: 7 for 52 laps
Laps	Reason
6–11	Debris (James Davison)
25–30	Marcus Ericsson crash in turn 2
84–91	Dalton Kellett crash in turn 3
92–99	Askew, Daly crash in turn 3
122–130	Álex Palou crash in turn 1
144–153	Alexander Rossi crash in turn 2
196–200	Spencer Pigot crash in turn 4

== Broadcasting ==
=== Television ===
The race was televised on NBC in the United States; also, for the first time since 2016, the race was not blacked out in the Indianapolis area, airing live on WTHR (channel 13), as ticket sales ended four weeks prior to the race, and under regulations of the Speedway and Marion County Public Health Department's orders regarding capacity limits for events, announced two weeks before tickets were revoked under Marion County orders. On the original date of the race, NBC aired an encore of the 2019 edition of the race, Back Home Again, with Mike Tirico joined by Simon Pagenaud and Alexander Rossi (645,000 viewers)

On August 23, the live coverage on NBC was scheduled to begin at 1 p.m. eastern, following live coverage of The AIG Open Championship. The start of the race was moved from 12:45 p.m. to 2:30 p.m. During coverage of practice, time trials, and race day, driver analyst Paul Tracy moved out of the Pagoda and reported from the Turn Two Suites. This mimicked the position Bobby Unser utilized from 1993 to 1997. Tracy's position offered unique perspective, as well as promoted social distancing among the reporters.

Absent from the crew was Dale Earnhardt Jr., who drove the pace car and served as analyst in 2019. Earnhardt was instead covering the NASCAR Drydene Twin 500km that aired on NBCSN. Also absent was Robin Miller, who relinquished on-air duties due to battling bone cancer. Miller did contribute to the broadcasts, providing narration to pre-taped features during practice and time trials.

The Nielsen rating of 2.26 (3.699 million viewers) was an all-time low for the event.

NBC
Booth Announcers	Pre/Post-Race	Pit/garage reporters
Announcer: Leigh Diffey; Color: Townsend Bell; Turn Two Suites: Paul Tracy	NBC Host: Mike Tirico; Analyst: Danica Patrick; Features: Rutledge Wood	Marty Snider; Kelli Stavast; Kevin Lee

=== Radio ===
The race was carried by the Indianapolis Motor Speedway Radio Network. The chief announcer or "Voice of the 500" for the fifth consecutive year was Mark Jaynes with Davey Hamilton as driver analyst.

Indianapolis Motor Speedway Radio Network
Booth Announcers	Turn Reporters	Pit/garage reporters	Guest Commentary
Chief Announcer: Mark Jaynes; Driver expert: Davey Hamilton; Historian: Donald Davidson	Turn 1: Nick Yeoman; Turn 2: Michael Young; Turn 3: Jake Query; Turn 4: Chris Denari	Rob Blackman (north pits); Ryan Myrehn (north-center pits); Rob Howden (south-center pits); Dave Furst (south pits)	Paul Page; Dave Wilson; Sam Rumpza; Mike Thomsen

== Notes ==
Previous race: 2020 Iowa IndyCar 250s	IndyCar Series; 2020 season	Next race: 2020 Bommarito Automotive Group 500
Previous race: 2019 Indianapolis 500	Indianapolis 500	Next race: 2021 Indianapolis 500
