= No Phone Zone =

Program developed by Oprah Winfrey

No Phone Zone

No Phone Zone is a program developed by Oprah Winfrey and released on March 6, 2010, about how to teach people not to talk or text on their cell phone while they are driving. The program was shown at the beginning and end of The Oprah Winfrey Show and was sponsored by Liberty Mutual and Sprint. FocusDriven is the official beneficiary of Winfrey's No Phone Zone.

== Creation ==
Winfrey released No Phone Zone on March 6, 2010, in an episode where teenagers were taught not to do any form of electronic communication in any vehicle. They should make any vehicle a "No Phone Zone". Winfrey also made viewers' comments about No Phone Zone via Skype, an Internet sharing video provider.

== No Phone Zone day ==
Winfrey declared the first national "No Phone Zone day" on April 30, 2010. Ray LaHood partnered with Winfrey to end distracted driving for anyone who resides in Chicago.

== Celebrity involvement ==
Winfrey has gathered a who's who of Hollywood's elite to support her efforts to put an end to distracted driving. More than 60 celebrities have supported the program including:

- Sandra Bullock
- Tina Fey
- Shaun White
- Morgan Freeman
- Sir Elton John
- Jerry Seinfeld
- the cast of TV's Glee
- Lady Antebellum
- Queen Rania

Also, a 15-year-old racecar driver who competes for Andretti Autosport, Zach Veach, has campaigned on Winfrey's behalf as a spokesKID, gathering celebrity support and awareness for the initiative. Veach announced on June 4, 2010, that he had added 33 Indianapolis 500 professional racecar drivers to the No Phone Zone. To date, Veach has added a number of celebrities to support the cause including:

- Danica Patrick
- Hélio Castroneves
- Tony Kanaan
- Anderson Cooper
- Paige Davis

For the 2010–2011 school year the Illinois Association of Student Councils Executive Board make the No Phone Zone their official state-wide service project to relate to their state convention theme; "The New Road to Leadership." Brexton Isaacs, President of the IASC, oversaw the project. The top 5 schools with the most pledge signers will be recognized at their state convention in May 2011.
