= Zach Veach =

American racing driver (born 1994)

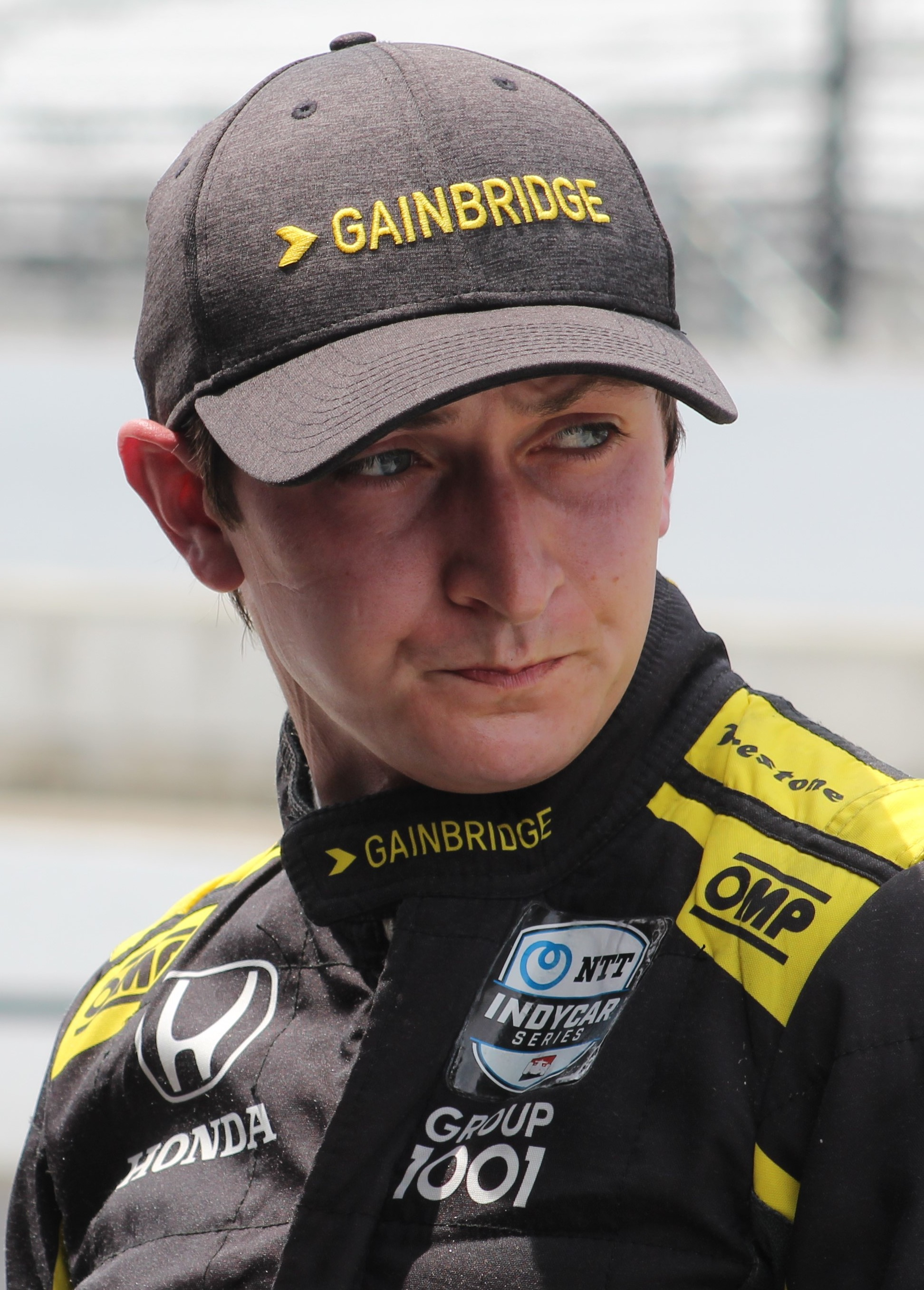
- Veach at the 2019 Indianapolis 500
- Nationality: (United States) American
- Born: Zachary Elson Veach; December 9, 1994 (age 31) Stockdale, Ohio, U.S.
- Categorisation: FIA Gold

IndyCar Series career
- 47 races run over 4 years
- Team: No. 26 (Andretti Autosport)
- 2019 position: 18th
- Best finish: 15th (2018)
- First race: 2017 Honda Indy Grand Prix of Alabama (Barber)
- Last race: 2020 Honda Indy 200 Race 2 (Mid-Ohio)
Wins	Podiums	Poles
0	0	0

Previous series
- 2013-2014 2016 2012 2010-2011: Indy Lights U.S. F2000 National Championship; Star Mazda Championship

Championship titles
- 2011 2012: U.S. F2000 Winterfest; Formula Car Challenge

Zachary Elson Veach (born December 9, 1994) is an American auto racing driver. He has previously competed in the IndyCar Series, where he last drove the No. 26 Honda for Andretti Autosport.

Veach was named to CNN's list of "Intriguing People" in May 2010, is the national spokesperson for FocusDriven, and released his first book, 99 Things Teens Wish They Knew Before Turning 16 on NBC's The Today Show on March 2, 2011.

== Racing career ==
=== Early career ===
Veach began racing at age twelve when he was "discovered" by former IndyCar Series team owner Sarah Fisher's dad, Dave Fisher. In nineteen months, Veach had gone from go-karts to the cockpit of an open-wheel Formula BMW machine. Near the end of 2009, while testing a Formula BMW, Atlantic Championship team owner Eric Jensen signed Veach to his team for the 2010 Atlantic Championship season. In early March 2010, the Series halted operations.

=== U.S. F2000 National Championship ===
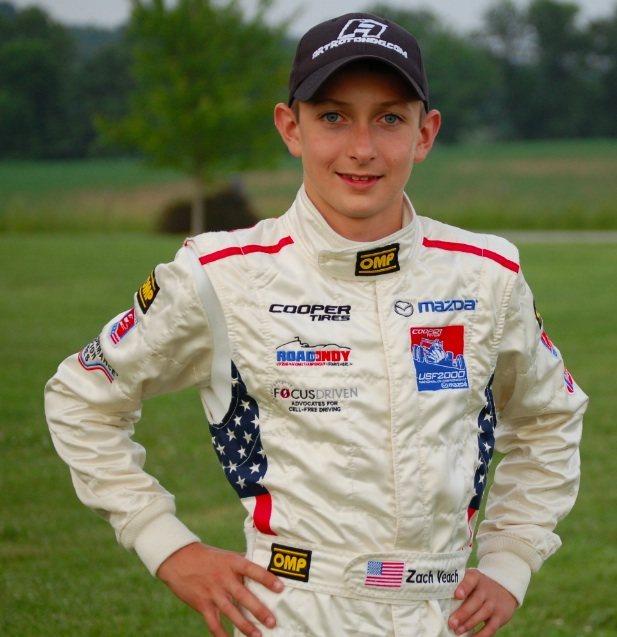
Veach in 2010

In his first year as a driver in the U.S. F2000 National Championship for Andretti Autosport, Veach had ten top-five finishes and four podium results. Despite entering the series after the season-opener (St. Pete) and therefore missing out on two rounds of race points, he managed to finish fifth in the driver championship point standings. His performances also contributed to Andretti Autosport securing the team championship for the 2010 season. He was also named a semi-finalist for Sports Illustrated's annual Sports Kid of the Year award.

On December 9, Andretti Autosport announced they had re-signed Veach to again compete in the USF2000 National Championship and WinterFest in 2011.

In January 2011, Veach won the 2011 U.S. F2000 Winterfest – a winter race series held in Florida. Veach won two of the five races and won the title by six points over Andretti teammate Spencer Pigot. Veach won the 2011 U.S. F2000 National Championship season opener at Sebring International Raceway. Veach finished fourth in series points.

=== Star Mazda Championship ===
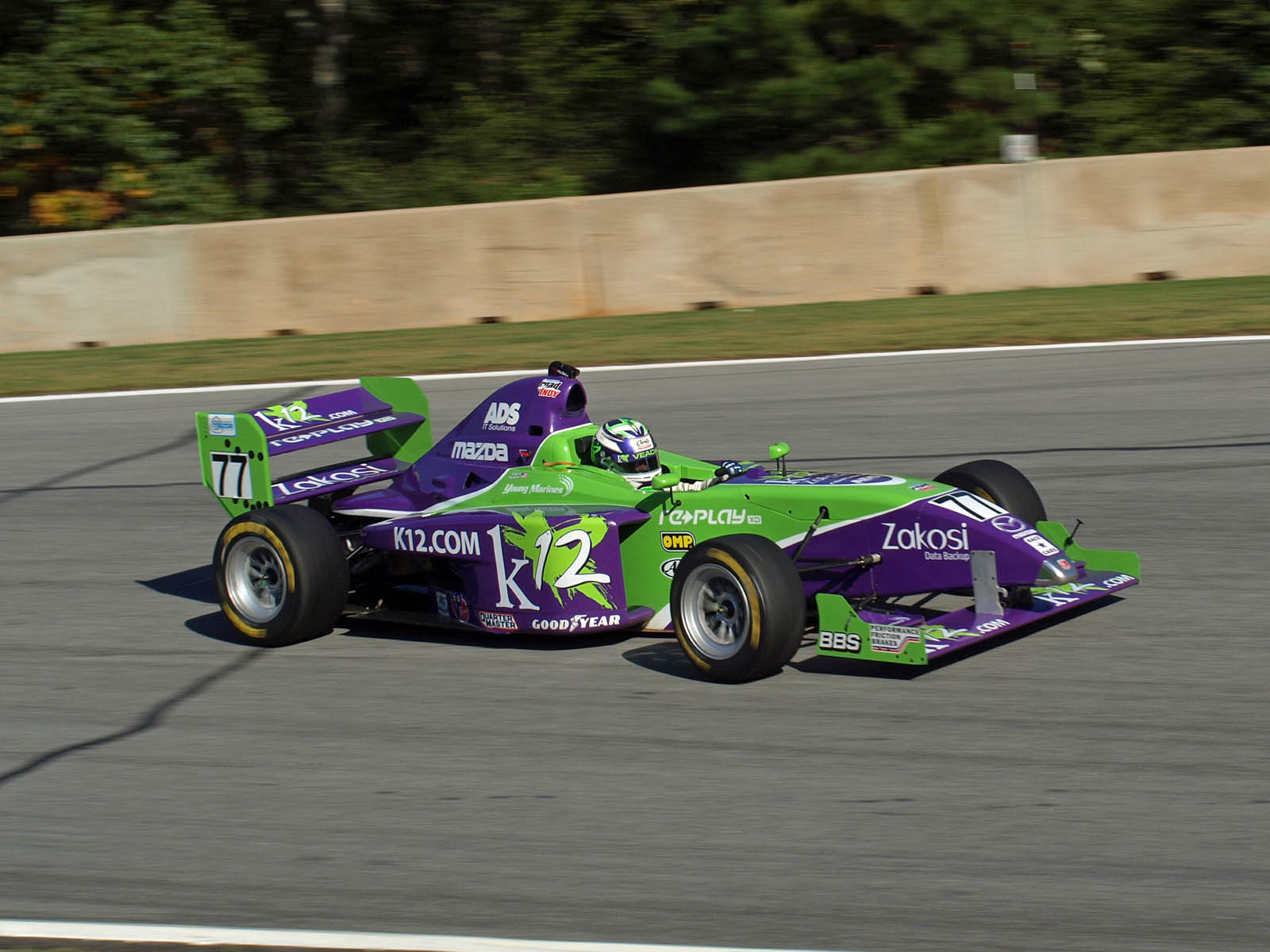
Veach racing in Star Mazda at Road Atlanta

Veach made his Star Mazda Championship debut for Andretti Autosport at Infineon Raceway in August 2011. He also competed in the series' season finale at Mazda Raceway Laguna Seca, where he finished third. He competed in the full season for Andretti Autosport in the No. 77 car in 2012, finishing tenth in points with a best finish of third at Lucas Oil Raceway at Indianapolis.

=== Indy Lights ===
Veach moved up to Indy Lights with Andretti Autosport in 2013. Veach led the most laps and finished on the podium in third at the Milwaukee Mile and won the pole at Auto Club Speedway on his way to seventh in points. He remained in the series and Andretti Autosport in 2014. He collected three wins and nine podiums in fourteen races to end third in the standings behind Gabby Chaves and Jack Harvey. After sitting out of the 2015 season due to an injury which required hand surgery, Veach returned to Indy Lights in 2016 with Belardi Auto Racing. After a rough start, where he suffered a mechanical failure while dominating the first race in St. Petersburg, he went on to collect three wins as well as several podium finishes throughout the eighteen race season.

During his Indy Lights racing career, Veach finished in the top-ten in 43 of the 44 races he competed in, or 97.73%.

=== IndyCar Series ===
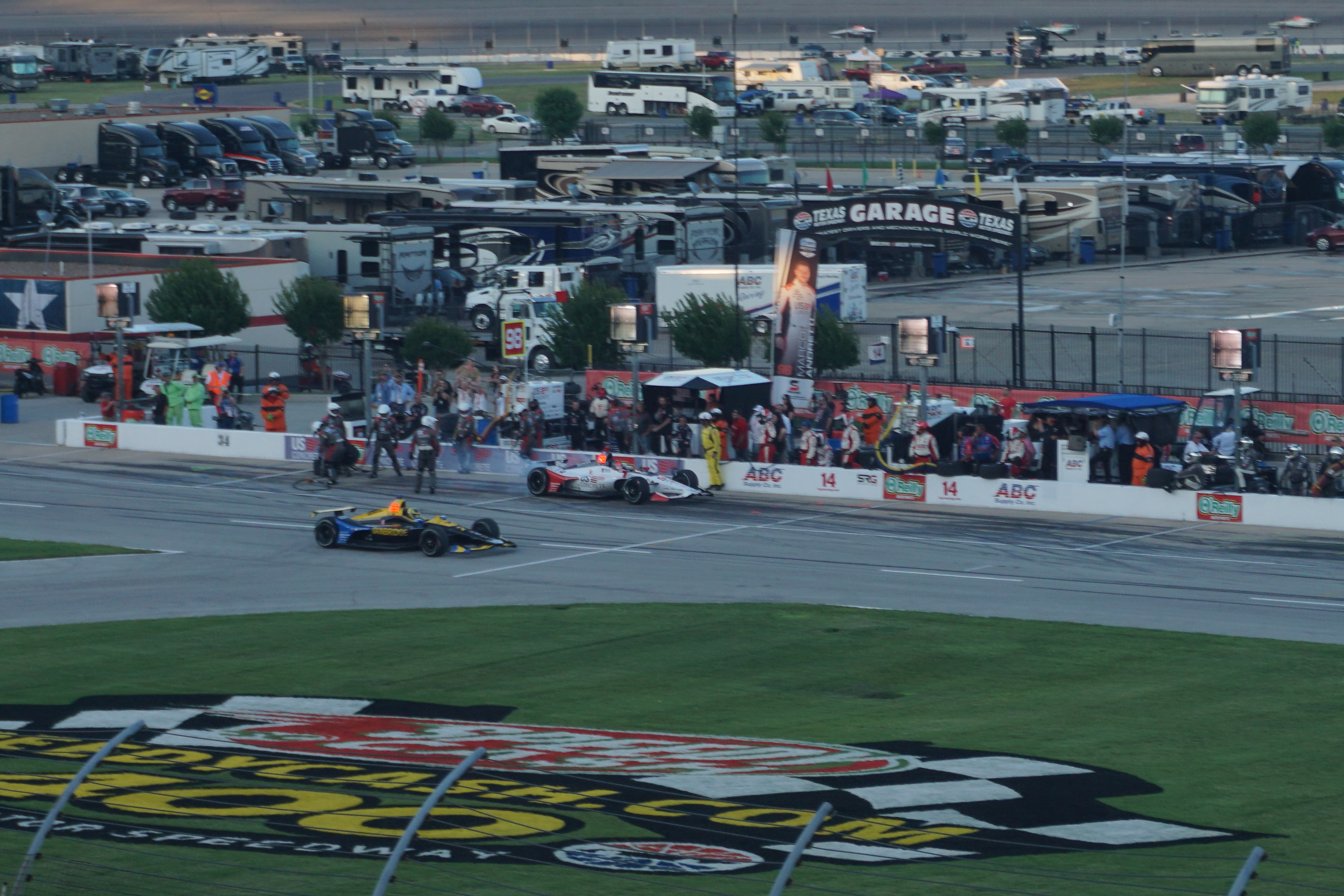
Veach (left) at Texas in 2019

Veach made his IndyCar Series debut at the 2017 Honda Indy Grand Prix of Alabama as a last-minute replacement driver for the injured J. R. Hildebrand. Despite the short notice and a limited amount of time to become familiar with the car prior to the event, he managed to close the performance gap to teammate Spencer Pigot in each session, from 1.5 seconds behind in the first practice to 1.1 in the second, 0.8 in the third and just 0.5 in qualifying. Veach started nineteenth and ran as high as fourth in the race, after pitting off-sequence, before finishing in nineteenth place, the last car on the lead lap.

Veach competed at the 2017 Indianapolis 500 for A. J. Foyt Enterprises, placing 26th, when he retired on lap 155 with mechanical issues.

On September 11, 2017, it was announced that Veach had reached an agreement to drive Andretti Autosport's fourth IndyCar full-time for the 2018 IndyCar Series season. The contract was three years in length.

On September 23, 2020, Andretti Autosport announced that Veach would be leaving the team ahead of the Harvest GP.

=== IMSA ===
For the 2021 season, Veach was signed by Vasser Sullivan Racing to drive a GTD-class Lexus RC at the IMSA SportsCar Championship, partnering with Frankie Montecalvo.

== Distracted driving campaign ==
Veach has been very outspoken about his interest in putting an end to distracted driving. On April 30, 2010, Veach attended the taping of The Oprah Winfrey Show's focus on the No Phone Zone program. At the program he met Jennifer Smith, founder and president of FocusDriven, the official beneficiary from Winfrey's No Phone Zone, and later became FocusDriven's national spokesperson. In May 2010, Veach campaigned to gain support from professional racecar drivers to support Winfrey's No Phone Zone. Veach announced on June 4, 2010, he had added 33 Indy 500 drivers support of the No Phone Zone, including that of Danica Patrick and Hélio Castroneves, among others.

In July 2010, Veach released an anti-texting app, urTXT, which automatically responds to a text message received by the phone.

On September 21, 2010, Veach attended the 2010 National Distracted Driving Summit where he was honored by United States Secretary of Transportation Ray LaHood, in addition to the Jonas Brothers and Jordin Sparks for their collective efforts to put an end to distracted driving.

== Musical career ==
Veach would star in the Indianapolis Opera's production of Gaetano Donizetti's comic opera Elixir of Love, to be held in November 2019.

== Racing record ==
=== U.S. F2000 National Championship ===
Year	Team	1	2	3	4	5	6	7	8	9	10	11	12	Rank	Points
2010	Andretti Autosport	STP	STP	ORP; 4	IOW; 5	NJM; 4	NJM; 5	ACC; 7	ACC; 6	ROA; 3	ROA; 3	ATL; 2	ATL; 4	**5th**	**189**
2011	Andretti Autosport	SEB; 1	SEB; 8	STP; 3	STP; 4	ORP; 2	MIL; 2	MOH; 5	MOH; 7	ROA; 3	ROA; 5	BAL; 12	BAL; 16	**4th**	**223**

=== Star Mazda Championship ===
Year	Team	1	2	3	4	5	6	7	8	9	10	11	12	13	14	15	16	17	Rank	Points
2012	Andretti Autosport	STP; 17	STP; 11	BAR; 15	BAR; 10	IND; 3	IOW; 6	TOR; 2	TOR; 17	EDM; 9	EDM; 17	TRO; 8	TRO; 8	BAL; 8	BAL; 6	LAG; 11	LAG; 17	ATL; 8	10th	199

=== Indy Lights ===
Year	Team	1	2	3	4	5	6	7	8	9	10	11	12	13	14	15	16	17	18	Rank	Points
2013	Andretti Autosport AFS Racing	STP; 5	ALA; 9	LBH; 9	INDY; 5	MIL; 3*	IOW; 7	POC; 4	TOR; 7	MOH; 5	BAL; 8	HOU; 10	**FON**; 4							7th	333
2014	Andretti Autosport	STP; 1*	**LBH**; 2	**ALA**; 1*	ALA; 3	IND; 9	IND; 7	INDY; 3	**POC**; 2	TOR; 5	MOH; 4	MOH; 2	MIL; 1	SNM; 7	SNM; 3					3rd	520
2016	Belardi Auto Racing	STP; 16	STP; 3	PHX; 8	ALA; 3	ALA; 10	IMS; 5	IMS; 10	INDY; 10	**RDA**; 1	RDA; 3	IOW; 2	TOR; 9	TOR; 6	MOH; 5	MOH; 4	WGL; 1	LAG; 3	LAG; 1	4th	332

=== IndyCar Series ===
(key)

Year	Team	No.	Chassis	Engine	1	2	3	4	5	6	7	8	9	10	11	12	13	14	15	16	17	Rank	Points	Ref
2017	Ed Carpenter Racing	21	Dallara DW12	Chevrolet	STP	LBH	ALA; 19	PHX	IMS													33rd	23	
2017	A. J. Foyt Enterprises	40	Dallara DW12	Chevrolet						INDY; 26	DET	DET	TEX	ROA	IOW	TOR	MOH	POC	GTW	WGL	SNM	33rd	23	
2018	Andretti Autosport	26	Dallara DW12	Honda	STP; 16	PHX; 16	LBH; 4	ALA; 13	IMS; 23	INDY; 23	DET; 12	DET; 13	TXS; 16	ROA; 22	IOW; 20	TOR; 7	MOH; 10	POC; 6	GTW; 5	POR; 19	SNM; 14	15th	313	
2019	Andretti Autosport	26	Dallara DW12	Honda	STP; 14	COA; 22	ALA; 12	LBH; 17	IMS; 12	INDY; 29	DET; 8	DET; 8	TXS; 20	RDA; 18	TOR; 13	IOW; 7	MOH; 21	POC; 13	GTW; 14	POR; 22	LAG; 18	18th	271	
2020	Andretti Autosport	26	Dallara DW12	Honda	TXS; 4	IMS; 14	ROA; 16	ROA; 16	IOW; 23	IOW; 20	INDY; 15	GTW; 21	GTW; 22	MOH; 20	MOH; 17	IMS	IMS	STP				21st	166	

* Season still in progress.

==== Indianapolis 500 ====
Year	Chassis	Engine	Start	Finish	Team
2017	Dallara	Chevrolet	32	26	A. J. Foyt Enterprises
2018	Dallara	Honda	25	23	Andretti Autosport
2019	Dallara	Honda	28	29	Andretti Autosport
2020	Dallara	Honda	17	15	Andretti Autosport

=== Complete WeatherTech SportsCar Championship results ===
(key) (Races in bold indicate pole position; races in italics indicate fastest lap)

Year	Entrant	Class	Make	Engine	1	2	3	4	5	6	7	8	9	10	11	12	Rank	Points
2021	Vasser Sullivan Racing	GTD	Lexus RC F GT3	Lexus 5.0 L V8	DAY; 13	SEB; 6	MOH; 2	DET	WGL; 11	WGL; 2†	LIM; 10	ELK; 6	LGA; 10	LBH; 13	VIR; 13	PET; 3	8th	2538

^{†} Points only counted towards the WeatherTech Sprint Cup and not the overall GTD Championship.
