= 2011 U.S. F2000 National Championship =

Car racing competition

Seasons
- ← 2010 2012 →

The 2011 U.S. F2000 National Championship is a season of the U.S. F2000 National Championship, an open wheel auto racing series that is the first step in IndyCar's Road to Indy ladder. It is the second full season of the series since its revival in 2010. It follows the first 2011 U.S. F2000 Winterfest winter championship. It consists of 12 races held over 7 race weekends on seven different tracks – two street circuits, two ovals, and three permanent road courses.

Finnish driver Petri Suvanto, in his first season racing in North America, won the championship with five wins and five second-place finishes by 47 points over American Spencer Pigot, the 2010 Skip Barber National Championship winner. British driver Wayne Boyd won two races and finished third while Zach Veach won the season opener but struggled during the second half of the season to wind up fourth in points. Sixteen-year-old New Yorker Luca Forgeois won the National Class over his only full-time National Class rival J. R. Smart.

== Drivers and teams ==
Team	No.	Driver(s)	Status	Round(s)
(United States) Cape Motorsports w/ Wayne Taylor Racing	2	(United States) Shannon McIntosh		All
(United States) Cape Motorsports w/ Wayne Taylor Racing	3	(Finland) Petri Suvanto		All
(United States) Cape Motorsports w/ Wayne Taylor Racing	32	(France) Vincent Beltoise		1–5
(United States) Belardi Auto Racing	4	(United Kingdom) Wayne Boyd		All
(United States) Belardi Auto Racing	9	(United States) Cole Morgan		1–4
(United States) Belardi Auto Racing	9	(United States) Luigi Biangardi		7–12
(United States) Pabst Racing Services	5	(Estonia) Tõnis Kasemets	U	3–4
(United States) Pabst Racing Services	5	(United States) Luca Forgeois	N	5–12
(United States) Pabst Racing Services	6	(United States) J. R. Smart	N	All
(United States) Pabst Racing Services	16	(United States) Rodin Younessi	N	5
(United States) Andretti Autosport	7	(United States) Zach Veach		All
(United States) Andretti Autosport	8	(United States) Spencer Pigot		All
(United States) JDC Motorsports	10	(Australia) Roman Lagudi	U	5, 7–12
(United States) JDC Motorsports	16	(United States) Rodin Younessi	N	7–12
(United States) JDC Motorsports	19	(Colombia) Juan Piedrahita		All
(United States) JDC Motorsports	85	(Australia) Luke Ellery		1–6
(United States) JDC Motorsports	85	(United States) Chris Miller	U	9–10
(United States) Auriana Racing	11	(Italy) Joe Colasacco	N U	7–8, 11–12
(United States) K-Hill Motorsports	12	(United States) Bruce Hamilton	N U	11–12
(United States) K-Hill Motorsports	65	(United States) Joe Woodward	N U	11–12
(Canada) Jensen MotorSport	13	(United States) Ryan Tveter	U	11–12
(United States) ArmsUp Motorsports	15	(United States) Rick Balsley	N U	9–10
(United States) ArmsUp Motorsports	56	(United States) Revere Greist	U	9–10
(United States) ArmsUp Motorsports	71	(United States) Jim Victor	N U	9–10
(United States) Sick Tea Motorsports	17	(United States) Timmy Megenbier		All
(United States) MidAtlantic Motorsports (United States) Eric Langbein Racing	25	(United States) Joe Blacker	N U	11–12
(United States) MidAtlantic Motorsports (United States) Eric Langbein Racing	53	(United States) Eric Langbein	N U	11–12
(United States) AcceleRace Motorsports	28	(United States) Ardie Greenamyer	N	7–8, 11–12
(United States) AcceleRace Motorsports	29	(United States) Ardie Greenamyer	N	1–4
(United States) AcceleRace Motorsports	29	(United States) Jonathan Scarallo	N U	7–8
(Canada) Brian Stewart Racing	33	(Canada) Matthew Di Leo		All
(United States) Stevenson Motorsports	97	(United States) Luca Forgeois	N	1–4

Icon	Legend
N	National Class
U	Unregistered drivers

== Schedule ==
The race schedule was announced on October 12, 2010.

Icon	Legend
O	Oval/Speedway
R	Road course
S	Street circuit

Rd.	Date	Track	Location	Supporting
1	March 17–18	R Sebring Raceway	Sebring, Florida	ALMS
2	March 17–18	R Sebring Raceway	Sebring, Florida	ALMS
3	March 26–27	S Streets of St. Petersburg	St. Petersburg, Florida	IndyCar Series
4	March 26–27	S Streets of St. Petersburg	St. Petersburg, Florida	IndyCar Series
5	May 28	O Lucas Oil Raceway at Indianapolis	Clermont, Indiana	USAC Midgets
6	June 19	O Milwaukee Mile	West Allis, Wisconsin	IndyCar Series
7	August 6–7	R Mid-Ohio Sports Car Course	Lexington, Ohio	IndyCar Series
8	August 6–7	R Mid-Ohio Sports Car Course	Lexington, Ohio	IndyCar Series
9	August 19–20	R Road America	Elkhart Lake, Wisconsin	ALMS
10	August 19–20	R Road America	Elkhart Lake, Wisconsin	ALMS
11	September 3–4	S Streets of Baltimore	Baltimore, Maryland	IndyCar Series
12	September 3–4	S Streets of Baltimore	Baltimore, Maryland	IndyCar Series

== Race results ==
Rd.	Track	Pole position	Fastest lap	Most laps led	Race winner	
Rd.	Track	Pole position	Fastest lap	Most laps led	Driver	Team
1	Sebring Raceway	(United States) Zach Veach	(United States) Zach Veach	(United States) Zach Veach	(United States) Zach Veach	(United States) Andretti Autosport
2	Sebring Raceway	(United States) Zach Veach	(Australia) Luke Ellery	(Finland) Petri Suvanto (Australia) Luke Ellery	(Australia) Luke Ellery	(United States) JDC MotorSports
3	Streets of St. Petersburg	(United States) Spencer Pigot	(Finland) Petri Suvanto	(United States) Spencer Pigot	(United States) Spencer Pigot	(United States) Andretti Autosport
4	Streets of St. Petersburg	(Finland) Petri Suvanto	(Finland) Petri Suvanto	(Finland) Petri Suvanto	(Finland) Petri Suvanto	(United States) Cape Motorsports
5	Lucas Oil Raceway at Indianapolis	(Finland) Petri Suvanto	(Finland) Petri Suvanto	(Finland) Petri Suvanto	(Finland) Petri Suvanto	(United States) Cape Motorsports
6	Milwaukee Mile	(United States) Zach Veach	(Australia) Luke Ellery	(United Kingdom) Wayne Boyd	(United Kingdom) Wayne Boyd	(United States) Belardi Auto Racing
7	Mid-Ohio Sports Car Course	(Finland) Petri Suvanto	(Finland) Petri Suvanto	(Finland) Petri Suvanto	(Finland) Petri Suvanto	(United States) Cape Motorsports
8	Mid-Ohio Sports Car Course	(Finland) Petri Suvanto	(Finland) Petri Suvanto	(Finland) Petri Suvanto	(Finland) Petri Suvanto	(United States) Cape Motorsports
9	Road America	(United States) Spencer Pigot	(United States) Spencer Pigot	(United Kingdom) Wayne Boyd (United States) Spencer Pigot	(United States) Spencer Pigot	(United States) Andretti Autosport
10	Road America	(United States) Spencer Pigot	(United States) Spencer Pigot	(United Kingdom) Wayne Boyd (United States) Spencer Pigot	(Finland) Petri Suvanto	(United States) Cape Motorsports
11	Streets of Baltimore	(Finland) Petri Suvanto	(United States) Spencer Pigot	(United Kingdom) Wayne Boyd	(United Kingdom) Wayne Boyd	(United States) Belardi Auto Racing
12	Streets of Baltimore	(United States) Spencer Pigot	(Finland) Petri Suvanto	(United States) Spencer Pigot	(United States) Spencer Pigot	(United States) Andretti Autosport

== Championship standings ==
=== Drivers' ===
Pos	Driver	SEB		STP		ORP	MIL	MOH		RA		BAL		Points
Championship Class
1	(Finland) Petri Suvanto	2	3*	2	**1***	**1***	5	**1***	**1***	2	1	2	2	328
2	(United States) Spencer Pigot	3	2	**1***	2	4	6	3	4	**1***	**2***	11	**1***	281
3	(United Kingdom) Wayne Boyd	11	6	7	3	5	1*	2	2	10*	3*	1*	15	229
4	(United States) Zach Veach	**1***	**8**	3	4	2	**2**	5	7	3	5	12	16	223
5	(Canada) Matthew Di Leo	9	11	4	7	6	8	6	5	7	6	3	13	174
6	(United States) Timmy Megenbier	7	14	15	6	7	7	4	3	5	4	17	7	151
7	(Colombia) Juan Piedrahita	6	5	12	9	3	3	7	8	6	15	16	14	145
8	(United States) Shannon McIntosh	14	12	8	13	11	9	13	12	17	17	8	11	101
9	(Australia) Luke Ellery	4	1*	14	8	13	4							92
10	(United States) Luigi Biangardi							8	6	11	8	4	12	78
11	(France) Vincent Beltoise	8	13	6	5	9								58
12	(United States) Cole Morgan	5	4	5	15									54
unregistered drivers ineligible for points
	(Australia) Roman Lagudi					8		9	9	8	13	5	3	
	(United States) Chris Miller									4	7			
	(United States) Ryan Tveter											10	8	
	(United States) Revere Greist									9	14			
	(Estonia) Tõnis Kasemets			13	14									
National Class
1	(United States) Luca Forgeois	10	9	9	10	10	10	12	14	16	9	9	5	220
2	(United States) J. R. Smart	13	10	10	12	12	11	15	16	12	10	18	10	166
3	(United States) Ardie Greenamyer	12	7	11	11	DNS		16	13					96
4	(United States) Rodin Younessi					14		14	15	15	12	19	17	68
unregistered drivers ineligible for points
	(Italy) Joe Colasacco							10	10			6	4	
	(United States) Eric Langbein											7	6	
	(United States) Joe Woodward											14	9	
	(United States) Jonathan Scarallo							11	11					
	(United States) Jim Victor									13	11			
	(United States) Joe Blacker											13	DNS	
	(United States) Rick Balsley									14	16			
	(United States) Bruce Hamilton											15	18	
Pos	Driver	SEB		STP		ORP	MIL	MOH		RA		BAL		Points

Color	Result
Gold	Winner
Silver	2nd place
Bronze	3rd place
Green	4th & 5th place
Light Blue	6th–10th place
Dark Blue	Finished (Outside Top 10)
Purple	Did not finish
Red	Did not qualify (DNQ)
Brown	Withdrawn (Wth)
Black	Disqualified (DSQ)
White	Did not start (DNS)
Blank	Did not participate (DNP)
Blank	Not competing

**In-line notation**
**Bold**	Pole position (1 point)
Italics	Ran fastest race lap (1 point)
*	Led most race laps (1 point); Not awarded if more than one driver leads most laps

Position	1	2	3	4	5	6	7	8	9	10	11	12	13	14	15	16	17	18	19	20+
Points	30	25	22	19	17	15	14	13	12	11	10	9	8	7	6	5	4	3	2	1

=== Teams' ===
Pos	Team	Points
1	(United States) Andretti Autosport	314
2	(United States) Cape Motorsports w/ Wayne Taylor Racing	259
3	(United States) Belardi Auto Racing	196
4	(United States) JDC Motorsports	174
5	(United States) Sick Tea Racing	81
6	(Canada) Brian Stewart Racing	65
7	(United States) Pabst Racing Services	29
8	(United States) Accelerace Motorsports	12
9	(United States) Stevenson Motorsports	8
10	(United States) ArmsUp Motorsports	7
11	(Canada) Jensen MotorSport	5
