= Matthew Di Leo =

Canadian racing driver (born 1995)

Matthew Di Leo (born March 2, 1995) is a Canadian racing driver from Barrie, Ontario, Canada.

After karting, Di Leo began racing in the U.S. F2000 National Championship in 2011 for Brian Stewart Racing. and finished fifth in points with a podium finish in Baltimore. That winter, he had finished third in the U.S. F2000 Winterfest. In 2012, he returned to U.S. F2000, this time driving for his own MDL Racing team. He finished ninth in the Winterfest and then finished fourth in points in the main championship, with four podium finishes and was running at the finish of all but one race. During the 2013 winter, he competed in the 24 Hours of Dubai and the 2013 U.S. F2000 Winterfest where he finished eighth. On April 9, 2013, he completed his first Firestone Indy Lights test at Buttonwillow Raceway and on April 16 announced that he would compete in the Long Beach Indy Lights race the following weekend. Starting ninth in the ten-car field, he finished fifth in the race.

== Racing record ==
=== U.S. F2000 National Championship ===
Year	Team	1	2	3	4	5	6	7	8	9	10	11	12	13	14	Rank	Points
2011	Brian Stewart Racing	SEB; 9	SEB; 11	STP; 4	STP; 7	ORP; 6	MIL; 8	MOH; 6	MOH; 5	ROA; 7	ROA; 6	BAL; 3	BAL; 13			5th	174
2012	MDL Racing	SEB; 12	SEB; 4	STP; 18	STP; 3	LOR; 8	MOH; 7	MOH; 2	ROA; 2	ROA; 4	ROA; 5	BAL; 3	BAL; 6	VIR; 7	VIR; 21	4th	220

=== Indy Lights ===
Year	Team	1	2	3	4	5	6	7	8	9	10	11	12	13	14	Rank	Points	Ref
2013	MDL Racing	STP	ALA	LBH; 5	INDY	MIL	IOW	POC	TOR; 9	MOH; 10	BAL; 6	HOU; 11	FON			9th	119	
2014	MDL Racing	STP	LBH	ALA	ALA	IND	IND	INDY	POC	TOR; 6	MOH	MOH	MIL	SNM	SNM	16th	28	
