= Jim Cornelison =

American singer (born 1964)

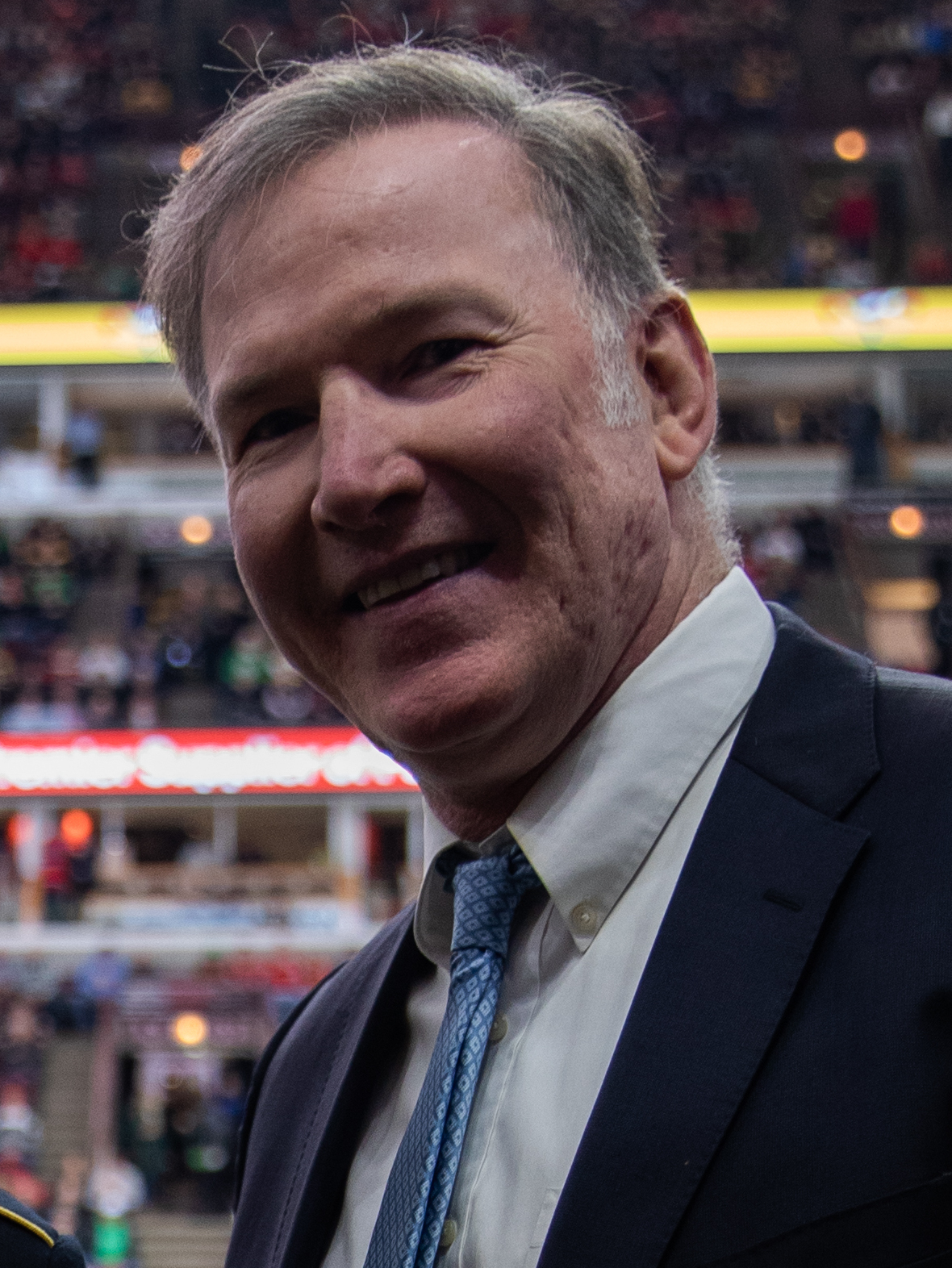
- Cornelison in 2023
- Born: June 20, 1964 (age 62)
- Education: Seattle Pacific University; Indiana University
- Years active: 1995–present

James Cornelison (born June 20, 1964) is an American singer who sings "The Star-Spangled Banner" and "O Canada" at the beginning of home games for the Chicago Blackhawks, accompanied by the organist Frank Pellico/Carrie Marcotte. Cornelison, a dramatic tenor, started singing the anthem for the Blackhawks part-time in 1996; he has been singing the national anthem for the Blackhawks full-time since 2007. Cornelison has sung "Back Home Again in Indiana" at the Indianapolis 500 since 2017. He has also performed the anthem before Chicago Bears home games at Soldier Field during the 2010–11 and 2025–26 NFL playoffs, as well as the 2011 season opener against the Atlanta Falcons, which fell on the tenth anniversary of the September 11 attacks. He also sang the National Anthem at the home opener of the 2019 season, the opening game of the 100th anniversary of the NFL, and the 2025 season. He was called a “local legend” in coverage of his performance singing the National Anthem when the USA played a send-off friendly against Germany at Soldier Field just days before their first match of the 2026 soccer World Cup.

Cornelison also sang at the 2015 NASCAR myAFibRisk.com 400 race at Chicagoland Speedway. He performed the National Anthem at the Bears' 2016 home-opener against the Philadelphia Eagles and their 2025 home-opener against the Minnesota Vikings.

He frequently sang the national anthem at the opening ceremonies for the Arlington International Festival of Racing at Arlington International Racecourse in the northwest suburbs of Chicago.

Cornelison graduated from Seattle Pacific University with degrees in music and psychology. He then went on to earn a master's degree in music from Indiana University in 1992. In 1995, he moved to Chicago and joined the Lyric Opera Center for American Artists.

== Awards ==
Cornelison has won several awards for music, including:

- The William Matheus Sullivan Foundation Award
- First place in the American Opera Society of Chicago's 1997 Vocal Competition
- The George London Foundation Encouragement Grant
