= Shannon McIntosh (racing driver) =

American racing driver

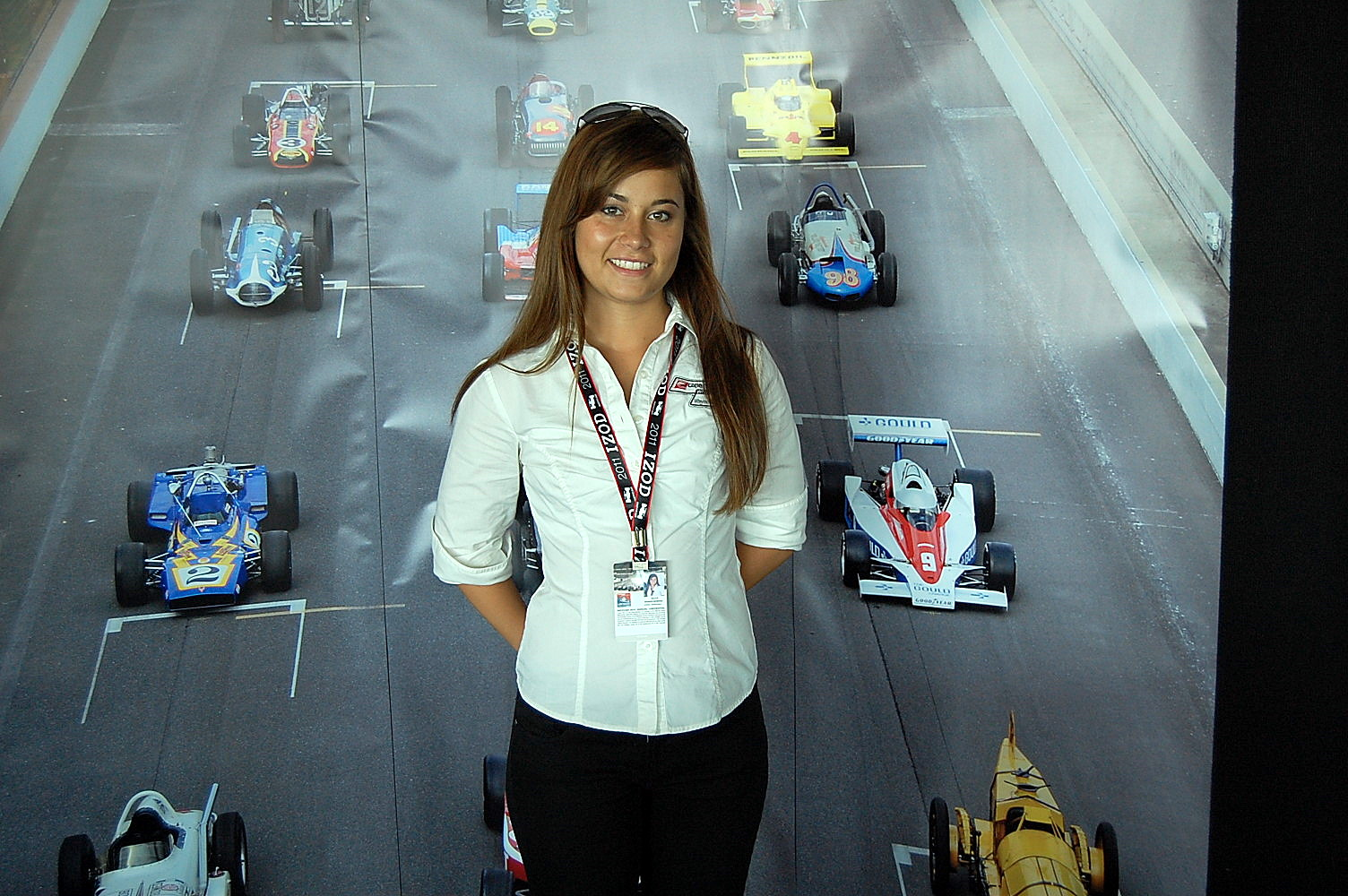
- McIntosh in 2011
- Born: July 24, 1989 (age 37); Miamisburg, Ohio, U.S.

ARCA Menards Series career
- 1 race run over 1 year
- Best finish: 102nd (2014)
- First race: 2014 SCOTT Get Geared Up 200 (IRP)
Wins	Top tens	Poles
0	0	0

Previous series
- 2005–2006, 2009–2010 2011–2012: USAC Midgets; U.S. F2000 National Championship

Shannon McIntosh Thilmany (born July 24, 1989) is an American former auto racing driver. She has competed in the ARCA Racing Series, U.S. F2000 National Championship, and United States Auto Club.

== Racing career ==
Born and raised in Miamisburg, Ohio, McIntosh began her racing career at age 5, amassing over 100 combined victories through Quarter Midgets and USAC Midgets. She drove for car builder and owner Bob East in 2010 in the USAC Midgets.

In 2011, McIntosh moved up to U.S. F2000 for Cape Motorsports with Wayne Taylor Racing in 2011. She finished eighth in the F2000 National Championship. During the year, McIntosh competed for the October 2011 cover of Seventeen as one of five finalists chosen from 35,000 applicants which also included a docu-reality special on MTV.

The following year, McIntosh drove for Pabst Racing Services in F2000. McIntosh was the only female competitor in the 2012 season and the only American woman in the Road to Indy. Her best race finish was eighth (twice) and 18th in the 2012 U.S. F2000 National Championship, scoring a best finish of eleventh.

After working for a drive during the 2013 season, McIntosh earned an opportunity to race part-time in the ARCA Racing Series for Cunningham Motorsports in 2014. Competing in the Scott Get Geared Up 200 at Lucas Oil Raceway at Indianapolis, McIntosh drove from 29th to score a 15th-place finish in the race.

McIntosh has been sponsored by companies like TrueCar and TAG Heuer while adorning a racing suit by AlpineStars and uses Arai Helmet. In 2014, she partnered with Dallas Mavericks owner and American businessman Mark Cuban with the social media app called Cyber Dust.

== Personal life ==
McIntosh attended the University of North Carolina at Charlotte in 2007 while working for the Richard Petty Driving Experience.

After ending her professional racing career, McIntosh became a motorsports marketing consultant. She formed the Driving Roots agency in 2018 and oversees social media for NASCAR Roots. She has also worked as a driver coach for the Porsche Experience Center in Atlanta.

McIntosh married her husband Michael Thilmany in 2021.

== Motorsports career results ==
=== ARCA Racing Series ===
(key) (Bold – Pole position awarded by qualifying time. Italics – Pole position earned by points standings or practice time. * – Most laps led.)

ARCA Racing Series results
Year	Team	No.	Make	1	2	3	4	5	6	7	8	9	10	11	12	13	14	15	16	17	18	19	20	ARSC	Pts	Ref
2014	Cunningham Motorsports	72	Dodge	DAY	MOB	SLM	TAL	TOL	NJE	POC	MCH	ELK	WIN	CHI	IRP; 15	POC	BLN	ISF	MAD	DSF	SLM	KEN	KAN	102nd	155	
