= 2023 GMR Grand Prix =

Indycar race held in Speedway, Indiana

(United States) 2023 GMR Grand Prix
Race details
5th round of the 2023 IndyCar season
← Previous race	Next race →
- Layout of the Indianapolis Motor Speedway Road Course
- Date: May 13, 2023
- Official name: GMR Grand Prix
- Location: Indianapolis Motor Speedway, Speedway, Indiana
- Course: Permanent road course 2.439 mi / 3.925 km
- Distance: 85 laps 207.315 mi / 333.641 km

Pole position
- Driver: (Denmark) Christian Lundgaard (Rahal Letterman Lanigan Racing)
- Time: 01:09.3321

Fastest lap
- Driver: (Spain) Álex Palou (Chip Ganassi Racing)
- Time: 01:11.2912 (on lap 8 of 85)

Podium
- First: (Spain) Álex Palou (Chip Ganassi Racing)
- Second: (Mexico) Pato O'Ward (Arrow McLaren)
- Third: (United States) Alexander Rossi (Arrow McLaren)

Chronology
Previous	Next
July 2022	August 2023

The 2023 GMR Grand Prix was the fifth round of the 2023 IndyCar season. The race was held on May 13, 2023, in Speedway, Indiana, at the Indianapolis Motor Speedway Grand Prix Road Course. The race consisted of 85 laps and was won by Álex Palou.

== Entry list ==
Key	Meaning
R	Rookie
W	Past winner

No.	Driver	Team	Engine
2	(United States) Josef Newgarden W	Team Penske	Chevrolet
3	(New Zealand) Scott McLaughlin	Team Penske	Chevrolet
5	(Mexico) Patricio O'Ward	Arrow McLaren	Chevrolet
06	(Brazil) Hélio Castroneves	Meyer Shank Racing	Honda
6	(Sweden) Felix Rosenqvist	Arrow McLaren	Chevrolet
7	(United States) Alexander Rossi W	Arrow McLaren	Chevrolet
8	(Sweden) Marcus Ericsson	Chip Ganassi Racing	Honda
9	(New Zealand) Scott Dixon W	Chip Ganassi Racing	Honda
10	(Spain) Álex Palou	Chip Ganassi Racing	Honda
11	(New Zealand) Marcus Armstrong R	Chip Ganassi Racing	Honda
12	(Australia) Will Power W	Team Penske	Chevrolet
14	(United States) Santino Ferrucci	A.J. Foyt Enterprises	Chevrolet
15	(United States) Graham Rahal	Rahal Letterman Lanigan Racing	Honda
18	(United States) David Malukas	Dale Coyne Racing with HMD Motorsports	Honda
20	(United States) Conor Daly	Ed Carpenter Racing	Chevrolet
21	(Netherlands) Rinus VeeKay W	Ed Carpenter Racing	Chevrolet
26	(United States) Colton Herta W	Andretti Autosport with Curb-Agajanian	Honda
27	(United States) Kyle Kirkwood	Andretti Autosport	Honda
28	(France) Romain Grosjean	Andretti Autosport	Honda
29	(Canada) Devlin DeFrancesco	Andretti Steinbrenner Autosport	Honda
30	(United Kingdom) Jack Harvey	Rahal Letterman Lanigan Racing	Honda
45	(Denmark) Christian Lundgaard	Rahal Letterman Lanigan Racing	Honda
51	(United States) Sting Ray Robb R	Dale Coyne Racing with Rick Ware Racing	Honda
55	(Denmark) Benjamin Pedersen R	A.J. Foyt Enterprises	Chevrolet
60	(France) Simon Pagenaud W	Meyer Shank Racing	Honda
77	(United Kingdom) Callum Ilott	Juncos Hollinger Racing	Chevrolet
78	(Argentina) Agustín Canapino R	Juncos Hollinger Racing	Chevrolet

== Practice ==
=== Practice 1 ===
Top Practice Speeds
Pos	No.	Driver	Team	Engine	Lap Time
1	5	(Mexico) Pato O'Ward	Arrow McLaren	Chevrolet	01:09.4981
2	45	(Denmark) Christian Lundgaard	Rahal Letterman Lanigan Racing	Honda	01:09.4988
3	10	(Spain) Álex Palou	Chip Ganassi Racing	Honda	01:09.5213

=== Practice 2 ===
Top Practice Speeds
Pos	No.	Driver	Team	Engine	Lap Time
1	10	(Spain) Álex Palou	Chip Ganassi Racing	Honda	01:09.9383
2	45	(Denmark) Christian Lundgaard	Rahal Letterman Lanigan Racing	Honda	01:10.2580
3	5	(Mexico) Pato O'Ward	Arrow McLaren	Chevrolet	01:10.2604

== Qualifying ==
=== Qualifying classification ===
Pos	No.	Driver	Team	Engine	Time				Final grid
Pos	No.	Driver	Team	Engine	Round 1		Round 2	Round 3	Final grid
Pos	No.	Driver	Team	Engine	Group 1	Group 2	Round 2	Round 3	Final grid
1	45	(Denmark) Christian Lundgaard	Rahal Letterman Lanigan Racing	Honda	**01:09.4639**	N/A	01:09.2282	**01:09.3321**	1
2	6	(Sweden) Felix Rosenqvist	Arrow McLaren	Chevrolet	01:09.5838	N/A	01:09.3604	01:09.3348	2
3	10	(Spain) Álex Palou	Chip Ganassi Racing	Honda	N/A	01:09.5351	**01:09.2082**	01:09.3780	3
4	30	(United Kingdom) Jack Harvey	Rahal Letterman Lanigan Racing	Honda	N/A	01:09.6238	01:09.3767	01:09.4220	4
5	5	(Mexico) Pato O'Ward	Arrow McLaren	Chevrolet	N/A	**01:09.2937**	01:09.3405	01:09.5422	5
6	27	(United States) Kyle Kirkwood	Andretti Autosport	Honda	N/A	01:09.6277	01:09.4131	01:09.6292	6
7	8	(Sweden) Marcus Ericsson	Chip Ganassi Racing	Honda	01:09.8343	N/A	01:09.4419	N/A	7
8	15	(United States) Graham Rahal	Rahal Letterman Lanigan Racing	Honda	01:09.5627	N/A	01:09.4711	N/A	8
9	9	(New Zealand) Scott Dixon **W**	Chip Ganassi Racing	Honda	N/A	01:09.6708	01:09.4757	N/A	9
10	7	(United States) Alexander Rossi **W**	Arrow McLaren	Chevrolet	N/A	01:09.4747	01:09.5471	N/A	10
11	11	(New Zealand) Marcus Armstrong **R**	Chip Ganassi Racing	Honda	01:09.6186	N/A	01:09.6148	N/A	11
12	12	(Australia) Will Power **W**	Team Penske	Chevrolet	01:09.7835	N/A	01:10.1872	N/A	12
13	2	(United States) Josef Newgarden **W**	Team Penske	Chevrolet	01:09.8402	N/A	N/A	N/A	13
14	26	(United States) Colton Herta **W**	Andretti Autosport with Curb-Agajanian	Honda	N/A	01:09.8375	N/A	N/A	14
15	29	(Canada) Devlin DeFrancesco	Andretti Steinbrenner Autosport	Honda	01:09.8676	N/A	N/A	N/A	15
16	3	(New Zealand) Scott McLaughlin	Team Penske	Chevrolet	N/A	01:09.9899	N/A	N/A	16
17	21	(Netherlands) Rinus VeeKay **W**	Ed Carpenter Racing	Chevrolet	01:09.9625	N/A	N/A	N/A	17
18	28	(France) Romain Grosjean	Andretti Autosport	Honda	N/A	01:10.0747	N/A	N/A	18
19	60	(France) Simon Pagenaud **W**	Meyer Shank Racing	Honda	01:10.2625	N/A	N/A	N/A	19
20	18	(United States) David Malukas	Dale Coyne Racing with HMD Motorsports	Honda	N/A	01:10.2562	N/A	N/A	20
21	20	(United States) Conor Daly	Ed Carpenter Racing	Chevrolet	01:10.2669	N/A	N/A	N/A	21
22	51	(United States) Sting Ray Robb **R**	Dale Coyne Racing with Rick Ware Racing	Honda	N/A	01:10.2747	N/A	N/A	22
23	55	(Denmark) Benjamin Pedersen **R**	A. J. Foyt Enterprises	Chevrolet	01:10.5181	N/A	N/A	N/A	23
24	77	(United Kingdom) Callum Ilott	Juncos Hollinger Racing	Chevrolet	N/A	01:10.2920	N/A	N/A	24
25	78	(Argentina) Agustín Canapino **R**	Juncos Hollinger Racing	Chevrolet	01:10.5424	N/A	N/A	N/A	25
26	06	(Brazil) Hélio Castroneves	Meyer Shank Racing	Honda	N/A	01:10.3509	N/A	N/A	26
27	14	(United States) Santino Ferrucci	A. J. Foyt Enterprises	Chevrolet	N/A	01:10.5879	N/A	N/A	27

Notes

- **Bold text** indicates fastest time set in session.

== Warmup ==
Top Practice Speeds
Pos	No.	Driver	Team	Engine	Lap Time
1	8	(Sweden) Marcus Ericsson	Chip Ganassi Racing	Honda	01:10.3872
2	7	(United States) Alexander Rossi W	Arrow McLaren	Chevrolet	01:10.4153
3	26	(United States) Colton Herta W	Andretti Autosport with Curb-Agajanian	Honda	01:10.6657

== Race ==
The race started at 3:45 PM ET on May 13, 2023.

=== Race classification ===
Pos	No.	Driver	Team	Engine	Laps	Time/Retired	Pit Stops	Grid	Laps Led	Pts.
1	10	(Spain) Álex Palou	Chip Ganassi Racing	Honda	85	1:47:56.7003	3	3	52	53
2	5	(Mexico) Pato O'Ward	Arrow McLaren	Chevrolet	85	+16.8006	3	5	2	41
3	7	(United States) Alexander Rossi W	Arrow McLaren	Chevrolet	85	+18.1448	3	10	3	36
4	45	(Denmark) Christian Lundgaard	Rahal Letterman Lanigan Racing	Honda	85	+23.4801	3	1	13	34
5	6	(Sweden) Felix Rosenqvist	Arrow McLaren	Chevrolet	85	+23.9258	3	2	3	31
6	9	(New Zealand) Scott Dixon W	Chip Ganassi Racing	Honda	85	+25.5206	3	9	3	29
7	2	(United States) Josef Newgarden W	Team Penske	Chevrolet	85	+26.3159	3	13		26
8	8	(Sweden) Marcus Ericsson	Chip Ganassi Racing	Honda	85	+31.8308	3	7	2	25
9	26	(United States) Colton Herta W	Andretti Autosport with Curb-Agajanian	Honda	85	+38.4189	3	14		22
10	15	(United States) Graham Rahal	Rahal Letterman Lanigan Racing	Honda	85	+48.8712	4	8	7	21
11	28	(France) Romain Grosjean	Andretti Autosport	Honda	85	+52.5732	4	18		19
12	12	(Australia) Will Power W	Team Penske	Chevrolet	85	+59.7698	3	12		18
13	21	(Netherlands) Rinus VeeKay W	Ed Carpenter Racing	Chevrolet	85	+1:07.0708	3	17		17
14	27	(United States) Kyle Kirkwood	Andretti Autosport	Honda	85	+1:08.1940	3	6		16
15	11	(New Zealand) Marcus Armstrong R	Chip Ganassi Racing	Honda	85	+1:15.8499	3	11		15
16	3	(New Zealand) Scott McLaughlin	Team Penske	Chevrolet	85	+1:23.6382	5	16		14
17	29	(Canada) Devlin DeFrancesco	Andretti Steinbrenner Autosport	Honda	84	+1 Lap	3	15		13
18	77	(United Kingdom) Callum Ilott	Juncos Hollinger Racing	Chevrolet	84	+1 Lap	4	24		12
19	20	(United States) Conor Daly	Ed Carpenter Racing	Chevrolet	84	+1 Lap	3	21		11
20	30	(United Kingdom) Jack Harvey	Rahal Letterman Lanigan Racing	Honda	84	+1 Lap	3	4		10
21	78	(Argentina) Agustín Canapino R	Juncos Hollinger Racing	Chevrolet	84	+1 Lap	3	25		9
22	06	(Brazil) Hélio Castroneves	Meyer Shank Racing	Honda	84	+1 Lap	3	26		8
23	14	(United States) Santino Ferrucci	A. J. Foyt Enterprises	Chevrolet	80	+5 Laps	3	27		7
24	55	(Denmark) Benjamin Pedersen R	A. J. Foyt Enterprises	Chevrolet	79	+6 Laps	3	23		6
25	60	(France) Simon Pagenaud W	Meyer Shank Racing	Honda	58	Mechanical	3	19		5
26	18	(United States) David Malukas	Dale Coyne Racing with HMD Motorsports	Honda	2	Collision damage		20		5
27	51	(United States) Sting Ray Robb R	Dale Coyne Racing with Rick Ware Racing	Honda	1	Collision		22		5
Fastest lap: (Spain) Álex Palou (Chip Ganassi Racing) – 01:11.2912 (lap 8)

== Championship standings after the race ==
Drivers' Championship standings

	Pos.	Driver	Points
2	1	(Spain) Álex Palou	174
Unchanged	2	(Mexico) Pato O'Ward	168
2	3	(Sweden) Marcus Ericsson	155
1	4	(France) Romain Grosjean	134
1	5	(New Zealand) Scott McLaughlin	133

Engine manufacturer standings

	Pos.	Manufacturer	Points
Unchanged	1	Honda	413
Unchanged	2	Chevrolet	387

- Note: Only the top five positions are included.

Previous race: 2023 Children's of Alabama Indy Grand Prix	IndyCar Series; 2023 season	Next race: 2023 Indianapolis 500
Previous race: 2022 GMR Grand Prix	Grand Prix of Indianapolis	Next race: 2024 Sonsio Grand Prix
