= 2023 Acura Grand Prix of Long Beach =

Indycar race held in Long Beach, California

(United States) 2023 Acura Grand Prix of Long Beach
Race details
3rd round of the 2023 IndyCar season
← Previous race	Next race →
- Date: April 16, 2023
- Official name: Acura Grand Prix of Long Beach
- Location: Streets of Long Beach
- Course: Temporary road course 1.968 mi / 3.167 km
- Distance: 85 laps 167.28 mi / 269.211 km

Pole position
- Driver: (United States) Kyle Kirkwood (Andretti Autosport)
- Time: 1:06.2878

Fastest lap
- Driver: (Spain) Álex Palou (Chip Ganassi Racing)
- Time: 01:07.9469 (on lap 70 of 85)

Podium
- First: (United States) Kyle Kirkwood (Andretti Autosport)
- Second: (France) Romain Grosjean (Andretti Autosport)
- Third: (Sweden) Marcus Ericsson (Chip Ganassi Racing)

Chronology
Previous	Next
2022	2024

The 2023 Acura Grand Prix of Long Beach was the third round of the 2023 IndyCar season. The race was held on April 16, 2023, in Long Beach, California on the Streets of Long Beach. The race consisted of 85 laps. Kyle Kirkwood, driving for Andretti Autosport, would win his first ever IndyCar Series race.

== Background ==
The Acura Grand Prix of Long Beach began as a Formula 5000 race sanctioned by the SCCA and USAC in 1975. In 1976, it became a Formula One event, and held that status until 1984 when it turned into a CART race, which eventually became IndyCar. Last year's champion was Josef Newgarden and other previous winners competing are Hélio Castroneves, Scott Dixon, Colton Herta, Simon Pagenaud, Will Power, and Alexander Rossi. The push-to-pass time allotment is a total of 200 seconds, with a maximum length of any given use of 20 seconds.

== Entry list ==
Key	Meaning
R	Rookie
W	Past winner

No.	Driver	Team	Engine
2	(United States) Josef Newgarden W	Team Penske	Chevrolet
3	(New Zealand) Scott McLaughlin	Team Penske	Chevrolet
5	(Mexico) Pato O'Ward	Arrow McLaren	Chevrolet
06	(Brazil) Hélio Castroneves W	Meyer Shank Racing	Honda
6	(Sweden) Felix Rosenqvist	Arrow McLaren	Chevrolet
7	(United States) Alexander Rossi W	Arrow McLaren	Chevrolet
8	(Sweden) Marcus Ericsson	Chip Ganassi Racing	Honda
9	(New Zealand) Scott Dixon W	Chip Ganassi Racing	Honda
10	(Spain) Álex Palou	Chip Ganassi Racing	Honda
11	(New Zealand) Marcus Armstrong R	Chip Ganassi Racing	Honda
12	(Australia) Will Power W	Team Penske	Chevrolet
14	(United States) Santino Ferrucci	A. J. Foyt Enterprises	Chevrolet
15	(United States) Graham Rahal	Rahal Letterman Lanigan Racing	Honda
18	(United States) David Malukas	Dale Coyne Racing with HMD Motorsports	Honda
20	(United States) Conor Daly	Ed Carpenter Racing	Chevrolet
21	(Netherlands) Rinus VeeKay	Ed Carpenter Racing	Chevrolet
26	(United States) Colton Herta W	Andretti Autosport with Curb-Agajanian	Honda
27	(United States) Kyle Kirkwood	Andretti Autosport	Honda
28	(France) Romain Grosjean	Andretti Autosport	Honda
29	(Canada) Devlin DeFrancesco	Andretti Steinbrenner Autosport	Honda
30	(United Kingdom) Jack Harvey	Rahal Letterman Lanigan Racing	Honda
45	(Denmark) Christian Lundgaard	Rahal Letterman Lanigan Racing	Honda
51	(United States) Sting Ray Robb R	Dale Coyne Racing with Rick Ware Racing	Honda
55	(Denmark) Benjamin Pedersen R	A. J. Foyt Enterprises	Chevrolet
60	(France) Simon Pagenaud W	Meyer Shank Racing	Honda
77	(United Kingdom) Callum Ilott	Juncos Hollinger Racing	Chevrolet
78	(Argentina) Agustín Canapino R	Juncos Hollinger Racing	Chevrolet

== Practice ==
=== Practice 1 ===
Top Practice Speeds
Pos	No.	Driver	Team	Engine	Lap Time
1	5	(Mexico) Pato O'Ward	Arrow McLaren	Chevrolet	01:06.6999
2	9	(New Zealand) Scott Dixon W	Chip Ganassi Racing	Honda	01:06.9649
3	26	(United States) Colton Herta W	Andretti Autosport with Curb-Agajanian	Honda	01:06.9808

=== Practice 2 ===
Top Practice Speeds
Pos	No.	Driver	Team	Engine	Lap Time
1	5	(Mexico) Pato O'Ward	Arrow McLaren	Chevrolet	01:05.9982
2	27	(United States) Kyle Kirkwood	Andretti Autosport	Honda	01:06.0149
3	28	(France) Romain Grosjean	Andretti Autosport	Honda	01:06.0629

== Qualifying ==
=== Qualifying classification ===
Pos	No.	Driver	Team	Engine	Time				Final grid
Pos	No.	Driver	Team	Engine	Round 1		Round 2	Round 3	Final grid
Pos	No.	Driver	Team	Engine	Group 1	Group 2	Round 2	Round 3	Final grid
1	27	(United States) Kyle Kirkwood	Andretti Autosport	Honda	**01:06.5593**	N/A	01:06.4568	**01:06.2878**	1
2	8	(Sweden) Marcus Ericsson	Chip Ganassi Racing	Honda	01:06.6600	N/A	01:06.4760	01:06.3253	2
3	28	(France) Romain Grosjean	Andretti Autosport	Honda	N/A	01:06.6780	**01:06.3246**	01:06.5347	3
4	10	(Spain) Álex Palou	Chip Ganassi Racing	Honda	N/A	**01:06.3995**	01:06.5651	01:06.5549	4
5	9	(New Zealand) Scott Dixon **W**	Chip Ganassi Racing	Honda	N/A	01:06.5305	01:06.5787	01:06.5730	5
6	5	(Mexico) Pato O'Ward	Arrow McLaren	Chevrolet	N/A	01:06.5906	01:06.3993	01:06.6039	6
7	26	(United States) Colton Herta **W**	Andretti Autosport with Curb-Agajanian	Honda	01:06.8246	N/A	01:06.6431	N/A	7
8	2	(United States) Josef Newgarden **W**	Team Penske	Chevrolet	01:07.2614	N/A	01:06.6452	N/A	8
9	3	(New Zealand) Scott McLaughlin	Team Penske	Chevrolet	N/A	01:06.6833	01:06.7251	N/A	9
10	6	(Sweden) Felix Rosenqvist	Arrow McLaren	Chevrolet	01:07.0130	N/A	01:06.7317	N/A	10
11	7	(United States) Alexander Rossi **W**	Arrow McLaren	Chevrolet	01:07.0328	N/A	01:07.1049	N/A	11
12	11	(New Zealand) Marcus Armstrong **R**	Chip Ganassi Racing	Honda	N/A	01:06.6488	01:09.7839	N/A	12
13	12	(Australia) Will Power **W**	Team Penske	Chevrolet	01:07.2681	N/A	N/A	N/A	13
14	60	(France) Simon Pagenaud **W**	Meyer Shank Racing	Honda	N/A	01:06.8010	N/A	N/A	14
15	30	(United Kingdom) Jack Harvey	Rahal Letterman Lanigan Racing	Honda	01:07.3150	N/A	N/A	N/A	15
16	06	(Brazil) Hélio Castroneves **W**	Meyer Shank Racing	Honda	N/A	01:06.9385	N/A	N/A	16
17	45	(Denmark) Christian Lundgaard	Rahal Letterman Lanigan Racing	Honda	01:07.3957	N/A	N/A	N/A	17
18	14	(United States) Santino Ferrucci	A. J. Foyt Enterprises	Chevrolet	N/A	01:06.9517	N/A	N/A	18
19	21	(Netherlands) Rinus VeeKay	Ed Carpenter Racing	Chevrolet	01:07.8796	N/A	N/A	N/A	19
20	29	(Canada) Devlin DeFrancesco	Andretti Steinbrenner Autosport	Honda	N/A	01:07.0294	N/A	N/A	20
21	51	(United States) Sting Ray Robb **R**	Dale Coyne Racing with Rick Ware Racing	Honda	01:07.9105	N/A	N/A	N/A	21
22	77	(United Kingdom) Callum Ilott	Juncos Hollinger Racing	Chevrolet	N/A	01:07.0490	N/A	N/A	22
23	55	(Denmark) Benjamin Pedersen **R**	A. J. Foyt Enterprises	Chevrolet	01:08.2970	N/A	N/A	N/A	23
24	15	(United States) Graham Rahal	Rahal Letterman Lanigan Racing	Honda	N/A	01:07.0909	N/A	N/A	24
25	18	(United States) David Malukas	Dale Coyne Racing with HMD Motorsports	Honda	No Time	N/A	N/A	N/A	25
26	78	(Argentina) Agustín Canapino **R**	Juncos Hollinger Racing	Chevrolet	N/A	01:07.5956	N/A	N/A	26
27	20	(United States) Conor Daly	Ed Carpenter Racing	Chevrolet	N/A	01:07.6986	N/A	N/A	27

Notes

- **Bold text** indicates fastest time set in session.

== Warmup ==
Top Practice Speeds
Pos	No.	Driver	Team	Engine	Lap Time
1	2	(United States) Josef Newgarden W	Team Penske	Chevrolet	01:06.5611
2	7	(United States) Alexander Rossi W	Arrow McLaren	Chevrolet	01:06.7540
3	26	(United States) Colton Herta W	Andretti Autosport with Curb-Agajanian	Honda	01:06.8118

== Race ==
The race started at 3:30 PM ET on April 16, 2023.

=== Race classification ===
Pos	No.	Driver	Team	Engine	Laps	Time/Retired	Pit Stops	Grid	Laps Led	Pts.
1	27	(United States) Kyle Kirkwood	Andretti Autosport	Honda	85	1:43:17.3748	2	1	53	54
2	28	(France) Romain Grosjean	Andretti Autosport	Honda	85	+0.9907	2	3		40
3	8	(Sweden) Marcus Ericsson	Chip Ganassi Racing	Honda	85	+2.0588	2	2		35
4	26	(United States) Colton Herta W	Andretti Autosport with Curb-Agajanian	Honda	85	+7.6371	2	7		32
5	10	(Spain) Álex Palou	Chip Ganassi Racing	Honda	85	+8.7770	2	4	2	31
6	12	(Australia) Will Power W	Team Penske	Chevrolet	85	+30.3224	2	13		28
7	6	(Sweden) Felix Rosenqvist	Arrow McLaren	Chevrolet	85	+30.9744	2	10		26
8	11	(New Zealand) Marcus Armstrong R	Chip Ganassi Racing	Honda	85	+31.9119	2	12		24
9	2	(United States) Josef Newgarden W	Team Penske	Chevrolet	85	+33.7842	2	8	27	23
10	3	(New Zealand) Scott McLaughlin	Team Penske	Chevrolet	85	+42.8320	2	9		20
11	14	(United States) Santino Ferrucci	A. J. Foyt Enterprises	Chevrolet	85	+45.4351	2	18		19
12	15	(United States) Graham Rahal	Rahal Letterman Lanigan Racing	Honda	85	+46.2809	2	24		18
13	30	(United Kingdom) Jack Harvey	Rahal Letterman Lanigan Racing	Honda	85	+47.2828	2	15		17
14	45	(Denmark) Christian Lundgaard	Rahal Letterman Lanigan Racing	Honda	85	+47.7781	2	17		16
15	60	(France) Simon Pagenaud W	Meyer Shank Racing	Honda	85	+49.4864	2	14		15
16	29	(Canada) Devlin DeFrancesco	Andretti Steinbrenner Autosport	Honda	85	+59.9343	2	20		14
17	5	(Mexico) Pato O'Ward	Arrow McLaren	Chevrolet	84	+1 Lap	2	6		13
18	51	(United States) Sting Ray Robb R	Dale Coyne Racing with Rick Ware Racing	Honda	84	+1 Lap	2	21		12
19	77	(United Kingdom) Callum Ilott	Juncos Hollinger Racing	Chevrolet	84	+1 Lap	4	22		11
20	18	(United States) David Malukas	Dale Coyne Racing with HMD Motorsports	Honda	84	+1 Lap	3	25		10
21	06	(Brazil) Hélio Castroneves W	Meyer Shank Racing	Honda	84	+1 Lap	3	16		9
22	7	(United States) Alexander Rossi W	Arrow McLaren	Chevrolet	83	Off Course	2	11		8
23	20	(United States) Conor Daly	Ed Carpenter Racing	Chevrolet	83	+2 Laps	3	27		7
24	55	(Denmark) Benjamin Pedersen R	A. J. Foyt Enterprises	Chevrolet	82	+3 Laps	3	23		6
25	78	(Argentina) Agustín Canapino R	Juncos Hollinger Racing	Chevrolet	52	+33 Laps	4	26	3	6
26	21	(Netherlands) Rinus VeeKay	Ed Carpenter Racing	Chevrolet	48	Mechanical	1	19		5
27	9	(New Zealand) Scott Dixon W	Chip Ganassi Racing	Honda	37	Mechanical	1	5		5
Fastest lap: (Spain) Álex Palou (Chip Ganassi Racing) – 01:07.9469 (lap 70)

== Championship standings after the race ==
Drivers' Championship standings

	Pos.	Driver	Points
1	1	(Sweden) Marcus Ericsson	110
1	2	(Mexico) Pato O'Ward	95
2	3	(Spain) Álex Palou	91
Unchanged	4	(United States) Josef Newgarden	89
15	5	(United States) Kyle Kirkwood	74

Engine manufacturer standings

	Pos.	Manufacturer	Points
1	1	Honda	254
1	2	Chevrolet	222

- Note: Only the top five positions are included.

Previous race: 2023 PPG 375	IndyCar Series; 2023 season	Next race: 2023 Children's of Alabama Indy Grand Prix
Previous race: 2022 Acura Grand Prix of Long Beach	Acura Grand Prix of Long Beach	Next race: 2024 Acura Grand Prix of Long Beach
