= 2023 Children's of Alabama Indy Grand Prix =

Indycar race held in St. Petersburg, Florida

(United States) 2023 Children's of Alabama Indy Grand Prix
Race details
4th round of the 2023 IndyCar season
| ← Previous race | Next race → |
- Layout of the Barber Motorsports Park
- Date: April 30, 2023
- Official name: Children's of Alabama Indy Grand Prix
- Location: Barber Motorsports Park, Birmingham, Alabama
- Course: Permanent road course 2.380 mi / 3.830 km
- Distance: 90 laps 214.200 mi / 344.700 km

Pole position
- Driver: (France) Romain Grosjean (Andretti Autosport)
- Time: 01:05.8396

Fastest lap
- Driver: (Australia) Will Power (Team Penske)
- Time: 01:07.8022 (on lap 63 of 90)

Podium
- First: (New Zealand) Scott McLaughlin (Team Penske)
- Second: (France) Romain Grosjean (Andretti Autosport)
- Third: (Australia) Will Power (Team Penske)

Chronology
| Previous | Next |
|---|---|
| 2022 | 2024 |

The 2023 Children's of Alabama Indy Grand Prix was the fourth round of the 2023 IndyCar season. The race was held on April 30, 2023, in Birmingham, Alabama at the Barber Motorsports Park. The race consisted of 90 laps and was won by Scott McLaughlin.

== Entry list ==
| Key | Meaning |
|---|---|
| R | Rookie |
| W | Past winner |

| No. | Driver | Team | Engine |
|---|---|---|---|
| 2 | (United States) Josef Newgarden W | Team Penske | Chevrolet |
| 3 | (New Zealand) Scott McLaughlin | Team Penske | Chevrolet |
| 5 | (Mexico) Patricio O'Ward W | Arrow McLaren | Chevrolet |
| 06 | (Brazil) Hélio Castroneves W | Meyer Shank Racing | Honda |
| 6 | (Sweden) Felix Rosenqvist | Arrow McLaren | Chevrolet |
| 7 | (United States) Alexander Rossi | Arrow McLaren | Chevrolet |
| 8 | (Sweden) Marcus Ericsson | Chip Ganassi Racing | Honda |
| 9 | (New Zealand) Scott Dixon | Chip Ganassi Racing | Honda |
| 10 | (Spain) Álex Palou W | Chip Ganassi Racing | Honda |
| 11 | (New Zealand) Marcus Armstrong R | Chip Ganassi Racing | Honda |
| 12 | (Australia) Will Power W | Team Penske | Chevrolet |
| 14 | (United States) Santino Ferrucci | A.J. Foyt Enterprises | Chevrolet |
| 15 | (United States) Graham Rahal | Rahal Letterman Lanigan Racing | Honda |
| 18 | (United States) David Malukas | Dale Coyne Racing with HMD Motorsports | Honda |
| 20 | (United States) Conor Daly | Ed Carpenter Racing | Chevrolet |
| 21 | (Netherlands) Rinus VeeKay | Ed Carpenter Racing | Chevrolet |
| 26 | (United States) Colton Herta | Andretti Autosport with Curb-Agajanian | Honda |
| 27 | (United States) Kyle Kirkwood | Andretti Autosport | Honda |
| 28 | (France) Romain Grosjean | Andretti Autosport | Honda |
| 29 | (Canada) Devlin DeFrancesco | Andretti Steinbrenner Autosport | Honda |
| 30 | (United Kingdom) Jack Harvey | Rahal Letterman Lanigan Racing | Honda |
| 45 | (Denmark) Christian Lundgaard | Rahal Letterman Lanigan Racing | Honda |
| 51 | (United States) Sting Ray Robb R | Dale Coyne Racing with Rick Ware Racing | Honda |
| 55 | (Denmark) Benjamin Pedersen R | A.J. Foyt Enterprises | Chevrolet |
| 60 | (France) Simon Pagenaud W | Meyer Shank Racing | Honda |
| 77 | (United Kingdom) Callum Ilott | Juncos Hollinger Racing | Chevrolet |
| 78 | (Argentina) Agustín Canapino R | Juncos Hollinger Racing | Chevrolet |

== Practice ==
=== Practice 1 ===
Top Practice Speeds
| Pos | No. | Driver | Team | Engine | Lap Time |
|---|---|---|---|---|---|
| 1 | 3 | (New Zealand) Scott McLaughlin | Team Penske | Chevrolet | 01:06.6610 |
| 2 | 26 | (United States) Colton Herta | Andretti Autosport with Curb-Agajanian | Honda | 01:06.8193 |
| 3 | 12 | (Australia) Will Power W | Team Penske | Chevrolet | 01:06.8985 |

=== Practice 2 ===
Top Practice Speeds
| Pos | No. | Driver | Team | Engine | Lap Time |
|---|---|---|---|---|---|
| 1 | 10 | (Spain) Álex Palou W | Chip Ganassi Racing | Honda | 01:06.2781 |
| 2 | 2 | (United States) Josef Newgarden W | Team Penske | Chevrolet | 01:06.5133 |
| 3 | 3 | (New Zealand) Scott McLaughlin | Team Penske | Chevrolet | 01:06.5386 |

== Qualifying ==
=== Qualifying classification ===
| Pos | No. | Driver | Team | Engine | Time | | | | Final grid |
| Pos | No. | Driver | Team | Engine | Round 1 | | Round 2 | Round 3 | Final grid |
| Pos | No. | Driver | Team | Engine | Group 1 | Group 2 | Round 2 | Round 3 | Final grid |
|---|---|---|---|---|---|---|---|---|---|
| 1 | 28 | (France) Romain Grosjean | Andretti Autosport | Honda | 01:05.6839 | N/A | **01:05.6829** | **01:05.8396** | 1 |
| 2 | 10 | (Spain) Álex Palou **W** | Chip Ganassi Racing | Honda | N/A | **01:05.5871** | 01:05.8386 | 01:05.9130 | 2 |
| 3 | 5 | (Mexico) Pato O'Ward **W** | Arrow McLaren | Chevrolet | N/A | 01:05.7400 | 01:05.7512 | 01:05.9382 | 3 |
| 4 | 3 | (New Zealand) Scott McLaughlin | Team Penske | Chevrolet | N/A | 01:05.7478 | 01:05.8061 | 01:05.9515 | 4 |
| 5 | 9 | (New Zealand) Scott Dixon | Chip Ganassi Racing | Honda | 01:05.7721 | N/A | 01:05.8986 | 01:06.0723 | 5 |
| 6 | 45 | (Denmark) Christian Lundgaard | Rahal Letterman Lanigan Racing | Honda | N/A | 01:05.8342 | 01:05.8661 | 01:06.1601 | 6 |
| 7 | 2 | (United States) Josef Newgarden **W** | Team Penske | Chevrolet | **01:05.5883** | N/A | 01:05.9603 | N/A | 7 |
| 8 | 6 | (Sweden) Felix Rosenqvist | Arrow McLaren | Chevrolet | N/A | 01:05.8696 | 01:06.0930 | N/A | 8 |
| 9 | 21 | (Netherlands) Rinus VeeKay | Ed Carpenter Racing | Chevrolet | 01:05.7808 | N/A | 01:06.1222 | N/A | 9 |
| 10 | 7 | (United States) Alexander Rossi | Arrow McLaren | Chevrolet | 01:05.6939 | N/A | 01:06.2091 | N/A | 10 |
| 11 | 12 | (Australia) Will Power **W** | Team Penske | Chevrolet | N/A | 01:05.9768 | 01:06.3790 | N/A | 11 |
| 12 | 27 | (United States) Kyle Kirkwood | Andretti Autosport | Honda | 01:05.7353 | N/A | 01:06.3963 | N/A | 12 |
| 13 | 8 | (Sweden) Marcus Ericsson | Chip Ganassi Racing | Honda | 01:05.9207 | N/A | N/A | N/A | 13 |
| 14 | 26 | (United States) Colton Herta | Andretti Autosport with Curb-Agajanian | Honda | N/A | 01:06.1850 | N/A | N/A | 14 |
| 15 | 77 | (United Kingdom) Callum Ilott | Juncos Hollinger Racing | Chevrolet | 01:06.0642 | N/A | N/A | N/A | 15 |
| 16 | 60 | (France) Simon Pagenaud **W** | Meyer Shank Racing | Honda | N/A | 01:06.2433 | N/A | N/A | 16 |
| 17 | 18 | (United States) David Malukas | Dale Coyne Racing with HMD Motorsports | Honda | 01:06.1851 | N/A | N/A | N/A | 17 |
| 18 | 29 | (Canada) Devlin DeFrancesco | Andretti Steinbrenner Autosport | Honda | N/A | 01:06.4415 | N/A | N/A | 18 |
| 19 | 15 | (United States) Graham Rahal | Rahal Letterman Lanigan Racing | Honda | 01:06.2504 | N/A | N/A | N/A | 19 |
| 20 | 20 | (United States) Conor Daly | Ed Carpenter Racing | Chevrolet | N/A | 01:06.4810 | N/A | N/A | 20 |
| 21 | 06 | (Brazil) Hélio Castroneves **W** | Meyer Shank Racing | Honda | 01:06.2715 | N/A | N/A | N/A | 21 |
| 22 | 78 | (Argentina) Agustín Canapino **R** | Juncos Hollinger Racing | Chevrolet | N/A | 01:06.5158 | N/A | N/A | 22 |
| 23 | 51 | (United States) Sting Ray Robb **R** | Dale Coyne Racing with Rick Ware Racing | Honda | 01:06.5925 | N/A | N/A | N/A | 23 |
| 24 | 30 | (United Kingdom) Jack Harvey | Rahal Letterman Lanigan Racing | Honda | N/A | 01:06.7181 | N/A | N/A | 24 |
| 25 | 55 | (Denmark) Benjamin Pedersen **R** | A. J. Foyt Enterprises | Chevrolet | 01:06.9327 | N/A | N/A | N/A | 25 |
| 26 | 11 | (New Zealand) Marcus Armstrong **R** | Chip Ganassi Racing | Honda | N/A | 01:07.2378 | N/A | N/A | 26 |
| 27 | 14 | (United States) Santino Ferrucci | A. J. Foyt Enterprises | Chevrolet | N/A | 03:49.1462 | N/A | N/A | 27 |

Notes

- **Bold text** indicates fastest time set in session.

== Warmup ==
Top Practice Speeds
| Pos | No. | Driver | Team | Engine | Lap Time |
|---|---|---|---|---|---|
| 1 | 7 | (United States) Alexander Rossi | Arrow McLaren | Chevrolet | 01:06.6677 |
| 2 | 26 | (United States) Colton Herta | Andretti Autosport with Curb-Agajanian | Honda | 01:06.7922 |
| 3 | 9 | (New Zealand) Scott Dixon | Chip Ganassi Racing | Honda | 01:06.8538 |

== Race ==
The race started at 3:30 PM ET on April 30, 2023.

=== Race classification ===
| Pos | No. | Driver | Team | Engine | Laps | Time/Retired | Pit Stops | Grid | Laps Led | Pts. |
|---|---|---|---|---|---|---|---|---|---|---|
| 1 | 3 | (New Zealand) Scott McLaughlin | Team Penske | Chevrolet | 90 | 1:47:58.9401 | 3 | 4 | 24 | 51 |
| 2 | 28 | (France) Romain Grosjean | Andretti Autosport | Honda | 90 | +1.7854 | 2 | 1 | 57 | 44 |
| 3 | 12 | (Australia) Will Power W | Team Penske | Chevrolet | 90 | +3.2699 | 3 | 11 | 3 | 36 |
| 4 | 5 | (Mexico) Pato O'Ward W | Arrow McLaren | Chevrolet | 90 | +20.5745 | 2 | 3 | | 32 |
| 5 | 10 | (Spain) Álex Palou W | Chip Ganassi Racing | Honda | 90 | +20.9762 | 2 | 2 | | 30 |
| 6 | 45 | (Denmark) Christian Lundgaard | Rahal Letterman Lanigan Racing | Honda | 90 | +23.5319 | 2 | 6 | | 28 |
| 7 | 9 | (New Zealand) Scott Dixon | Chip Ganassi Racing | Honda | 90 | +24.2769 | 2 | 5 | | 26 |
| 8 | 7 | (United States) Alexander Rossi | Arrow McLaren | Chevrolet | 90 | +25.0582 | 3 | 10 | | 24 |
| 9 | 6 | (Sweden) Felix Rosenqvist | Arrow McLaren | Chevrolet | 90 | +25.5107 | 3 | 8 | | 22 |
| 10 | 8 | (Sweden) Marcus Ericsson | Chip Ganassi Racing | Honda | 90 | +26.0190 | 2 | 13 | | 20 |
| 11 | 11 | (New Zealand) Marcus Armstrong R | Chip Ganassi Racing | Honda | 90 | +28.5527 | 2 | 26 | | 19 |
| 12 | 27 | (United States) Kyle Kirkwood | Andretti Autosport | Honda | 90 | +36.3667 | 2 | 12 | | 18 |
| 13 | 77 | (United Kingdom) Callum Ilott | Juncos Hollinger Racing | Chevrolet | 90 | +42.4441 | 3 | 15 | | 17 |
| 14 | 26 | (United States) Colton Herta | Andretti Autosport with Curb-Agajanian | Honda | 90 | +43.7781 | 2 | 14 | | 16 |
| 15 | 2 | (United States) Josef Newgarden W | Team Penske | Chevrolet | 90 | +45.7346 | 3 | 7 | 6 | 16 |
| 16 | 21 | (Netherlands) Rinus VeeKay | Ed Carpenter Racing | Chevrolet | 90 | +55.1118 | 2 | 9 | | 14 |
| 17 | 15 | (United States) Graham Rahal | Rahal Letterman Lanigan Racing | Honda | 90 | +56.4422 | 3 | 19 | | 13 |
| 18 | 60 | (France) Simon Pagenaud W | Meyer Shank Racing | Honda | 90 | +56.7500 | 2 | 16 | | 12 |
| 19 | 18 | (United States) David Malukas | Dale Coyne Racing with HMD Motorsports | Honda | 90 | +57.7650 | 3 | 17 | | 11 |
| 20 | 14 | (United States) Santino Ferrucci | A. J. Foyt Enterprises | Chevrolet | 90 | +58.5106 | 3 | 27 | | 10 |
| 21 | 06 | (Brazil) Hélio Castroneves W | Meyer Shank Racing | Honda | 90 | +1:00.0847 | 2 | 21 | | 9 |
| 22 | 55 | (Denmark) Benjamin Pedersen R | A. J. Foyt Enterprises | Chevrolet | 90 | +1:01.3063 | 3 | 25 | | 8 |
| 23 | 29 | (Canada) Devlin DeFrancesco | Andretti Steinbrenner Autosport | Honda | 90 | +1:03.1924 | 2 | 18 | | 7 |
| 24 | 30 | (United Kingdom) Jack Harvey | Rahal Letterman Lanigan Racing | Honda | 90 | +1:04.5393 | 2 | 24 | | 6 |
| 25 | 20 | (United States) Conor Daly | Ed Carpenter Racing | Chevrolet | 90 | +1:05.6055 | 3 | 20 | | 5 |
| 26 | 78 | (Argentina) Agustín Canapino R | Juncos Hollinger Racing | Chevrolet | 90 | +1:06.1483 | 3 | 22 | | 5 |
| 27 | 51 | (United States) Sting Ray Robb R | Dale Coyne Racing with Rick Ware Racing | Honda | 36 | Mechanical | 2 | 23 | | 5 |
Fastest lap: (Australia) Will Power (Team Penske) – 01:07.8022 (lap 63)

== Championship standings after the race ==
Drivers' Championship standings

| | Pos. | Driver | Points |
|---|---|---|---|
| Unchanged | 1 | (Sweden) Marcus Ericsson | 130 |
| Unchanged | 2 | (Mexico) Pato O'Ward | 127 |
| Unchanged | 3 | (Spain) Álex Palou | 121 |
| 6 | 4 | (New Zealand) Scott McLaughlin | 119 |
| 2 | 5 | (France) Romain Grosjean | 115 |

Engine manufacturer standings

| | Pos. | Manufacturer | Points |
|---|---|---|---|
| Unchanged | 1 | Honda | 325 |
| Unchanged | 2 | Chevrolet | 312 |

- Note: Only the top five positions are included.

| Previous race: 2023 Acura Grand Prix of Long Beach | IndyCar Series; 2023 season | Next race: 2023 GMR Grand Prix |
| Previous race: 2022 Honda Indy Grand Prix of Alabama | Children's of Alabama Indy Grand Prix | Next race: 2024 Children's of Alabama Indy Grand Prix |
