= 2023 PPG 375 =

Indycar race held in Fort Worth, Texas

(United States) 2023 PPG 375
Race details
2nd round of the 2023 IndyCar season
← Previous race	Next race →
- Layout of the Texas Motor Speedway
- Date: April 2, 2023
- Official name: PPG 375
- Location: Texas Motor Speedway
- Course: Permanent racing facility 1.5 mi / 2.4 km
- Distance: 250 laps 375.00 mi / 603.504 km

Pole position
- Driver: (Sweden) Felix Rosenqvist (Arrow McLaren)
- Time: 00:47.0708 (total time from 2 laps)

Fastest lap
- Driver: (Mexico) Pato O'Ward (Arrow McLaren)
- Time: 00:23.4475 (on lap 118 of 250)

Podium
- First: (United States) Josef Newgarden (Team Penske)
- Second: (Mexico) Pato O'Ward (Arrow McLaren)
- Third: (Spain) Álex Palou (Chip Ganassi Racing)

Chronology
Previous
2022

The 2023 PPG 375 was the second round of the 2023 IndyCar season. The race was held on April 2, 2023, in Fort Worth, Texas at the Texas Motor Speedway. The race consisted of 250 laps and was won by Josef Newgarden.

== Entry list ==
Key	Meaning
R	Rookie
W	Past winner

No.	Driver	Team	Engine
2	(United States) Josef Newgarden W	Team Penske	Chevrolet
3	(New Zealand) Scott McLaughlin	Team Penske	Chevrolet
5	(Mexico) Pato O'Ward W	Arrow McLaren	Chevrolet
06	(Brazil) Hélio Castroneves W	Meyer Shank Racing	Honda
6	(Sweden) Felix Rosenqvist	Arrow McLaren	Chevrolet
7	(United States) Alexander Rossi	Arrow McLaren	Chevrolet
8	(Sweden) Marcus Ericsson	Chip Ganassi Racing	Honda
9	(New Zealand) Scott Dixon W	Chip Ganassi Racing	Honda
10	(Spain) Álex Palou	Chip Ganassi Racing	Honda
11	(Japan) Takuma Sato	Chip Ganassi Racing	Honda
12	(Australia) Will Power W	Team Penske	Chevrolet
14	(United States) Santino Ferrucci	A. J. Foyt Enterprises	Chevrolet
15	(United States) Graham Rahal W	Rahal Letterman Lanigan Racing	Honda
18	(United States) David Malukas	Dale Coyne Racing with HMD Motorsports	Honda
20	(United States) Conor Daly	Ed Carpenter Racing	Chevrolet
21	(Netherlands) Rinus VeeKay	Ed Carpenter Racing	Chevrolet
26	(United States) Colton Herta	Andretti Autosport with Curb-Agajanian	Honda
27	(United States) Kyle Kirkwood	Andretti Autosport	Honda
28	(France) Romain Grosjean	Andretti Autosport	Honda
29	(Canada) Devlin DeFrancesco	Andretti Steinbrenner Autosport	Honda
30	(United Kingdom) Jack Harvey	Rahal Letterman Lanigan Racing	Honda
33	(United States) Ed Carpenter W	Ed Carpenter Racing	Chevrolet
45	(Denmark) Christian Lundgaard	Rahal Letterman Lanigan Racing	Honda
51	(United States) Sting Ray Robb R	Dale Coyne Racing with Rick Ware Racing	Honda
55	(Denmark) Benjamin Pedersen R	A. J. Foyt Enterprises	Chevrolet
60	(France) Simon Pagenaud	Meyer Shank Racing	Honda
77	(United Kingdom) Callum Ilott	Juncos Hollinger Racing	Chevrolet
78	(Argentina) Agustín Canapino R	Juncos Hollinger Racing	Chevrolet

== Practice ==
=== Practice 1 ===
Top Practice Speeds
Pos	No.	Driver	Team	Engine	Lap Time
1	3	(New Zealand) Scott McLaughlin	Team Penske	Chevrolet	00:23.1690
2	5	(Mexico) Pato O'Ward W	Arrow McLaren	Chevrolet	00:23.1928
3	7	(United States) Alexander Rossi	Arrow McLaren	Chevrolet	00:23.1980

=== Final Practice ===
Top Practice Speeds
Pos	No.	Driver	Team	Engine	Lap Time
1	9	(New Zealand) Scott Dixon W	Chip Ganassi Racing	Honda	00:23.3117
2	2	(United States) Josef Newgarden W	Team Penske	Chevrolet	00:23.3732
3	11	(Japan) Takuma Sato	Chip Ganassi Racing	Honda	00:23.4579

== Qualifying ==
=== Qualifying classification ===
Pos	No.	Driver	Team	Engine	Lap 1	Lap 2	Total Time	Final grid
1	6	(Sweden) Felix Rosenqvist	Arrow McLaren	Chevrolet	23.5123	23.5585	00:47.0708	1
2	9	(New Zealand) Scott Dixon W	Chip Ganassi Racing	Honda	23.5364	23.5968	00:47.1332	2
3	7	(United States) Alexander Rossi	Arrow McLaren	Chevrolet	23.5450	23.5908	00:47.1358	3
4	2	(United States) Josef Newgarden W	Team Penske	Chevrolet	23.5617	23.6083	00:47.1700	4
5	5	(Mexico) Pato O'Ward W	Arrow McLaren	Chevrolet	23.5778	23.6312	00:47.2090	5
6	11	(Japan) Takuma Sato	Chip Ganassi Racing	Honda	23.6004	23.6324	00:47.2328	6
7	10	(Spain) Álex Palou	Chip Ganassi Racing	Honda	23.5950	23.6439	00:47.2389	7
8	12	(Australia) Will Power W	Team Penske	Chevrolet	23.5341	23.7318	00:47.2659	8
9	18	(United States) David Malukas	Dale Coyne Racing with HMD Motorsports	Honda	23.6111	23.6761	00:47.2872	9
10	26	(United States) Colton Herta	Andretti Autosport with Curb-Agajanian	Honda	23.6196	23.6831	00:47.3027	10
11	28	(France) Romain Grosjean	Andretti Autosport	Honda	23.6208	23.6861	00:47.3069	11
12	29	(Canada) Devlin DeFrancesco	Andretti Steinbrenner Autosport	Honda	23.6322	23.6787	00:47.3109	12
13	55	(Denmark) Benjamin Pedersen R	A. J. Foyt Enterprises	Chevrolet	23.6182	23.7027	00:47.3209	13
14	14	(United States) Santino Ferrucci	A. J. Foyt Enterprises	Chevrolet	23.6500	23.7158	00:47.3658	14
15	3	(New Zealand) Scott McLaughlin	Team Penske	Chevrolet	23.6761	23.7172	00:47.3933	15
16	8	(Sweden) Marcus Ericsson	Chip Ganassi Racing	Honda	23.6718	23.7361	00:47.4079	16
17	77	(United Kingdom) Callum Ilott	Juncos Hollinger Racing	Chevrolet	23.7364	23.7303	00:47.4667	17
18	33	(United States) Ed Carpenter W	Ed Carpenter Racing	Chevrolet	23.6818	23.7962	00:47.4780	18
19	78	(Argentina) Agustín Canapino R	Juncos Hollinger Racing	Chevrolet	23.7378	23.7419	00:47.4797	19
20	27	(United States) Kyle Kirkwood	Andretti Autosport	Honda	23.7173	23.7929	00:47.5102	20
21	06	(Brazil) Hélio Castroneves W	Meyer Shank Racing	Honda	23.7827	23.7342	00:47.5169	21
22	60	(France) Simon Pagenaud	Meyer Shank Racing	Honda	23.7495	23.7876	00:47.5371	22
23	51	(United States) Sting Ray Robb R	Dale Coyne Racing with Rick Ware Racing	Honda	23.8019	23.8286	00:47.6305	23
24	15	(United States) Graham Rahal W	Rahal Letterman Lanigan Racing	Honda	23.8244	23.8202	00:47.6446	24
25	20	(United States) Conor Daly	Ed Carpenter Racing	Chevrolet	23.7971	23.8813	00:47.6784	25
26	21	(Netherlands) Rinus VeeKay	Ed Carpenter Racing	Chevrolet	23.8705	23.9347	00:47.8052	26
27	45	(Denmark) Christian Lundgaard	Rahal Letterman Lanigan Racing	Honda	23.9945	23.9589	00:47.9534	27
28	30	(United Kingdom) Jack Harvey	Rahal Letterman Lanigan Racing	Honda	23.8894	24.0877	00:47.9771	28

== Race ==
The race was started at 12:00 PM ET on April 2, 2023.

=== Race classification ===
Pos	No.	Driver	Team	Engine	Laps	Time/Retired	Pit Stops	Grid	Laps Led	Pts.
1	2	(United States) Josef Newgarden W	Team Penske	Chevrolet	250	2:07:07.2653	6	4	123	53
2	5	(Mexico) Pato O'Ward W	Arrow McLaren	Chevrolet	250	+1.2838	5	5	91	41
3	10	(Spain) Álex Palou	Chip Ganassi Racing	Honda	250	+1.8839	4	7	22	36
4	18	(United States) David Malukas	Dale Coyne Racing with HMD Motorsports	Honda	250	+2.1173	4	9		32
5	9	(New Zealand) Scott Dixon W	Chip Ganassi Racing	Honda	250	+2.4379	5	2	3	31
6	3	(New Zealand) Scott McLaughlin	Team Penske	Chevrolet	250	+4.1359	5	15		28
7	26	(United States) Colton Herta	Andretti Autosport with Curb-Agajanian	Honda	250	+6.4228	4	10	4	27
8	8	(Sweden) Marcus Ericsson	Chip Ganassi Racing	Honda	249	+1 Lap	6	16		24
9	77	(United Kingdom) Callum Ilott	Juncos Hollinger Racing	Chevrolet	249	+1 Lap	6	17		22
10	06	(Brazil) Hélio Castroneves W	Meyer Shank Racing	Honda	249	+1 Lap	5	21		20
11	21	(Netherlands) Rinus VeeKay	Ed Carpenter Racing	Chevrolet	249	+1 Lap	6	26		19
12	78	(Argentina) Agustín Canapino R	Juncos Hollinger Racing	Chevrolet	249	+1 Lap	6	19		18
13	33	(United States) Ed Carpenter W	Ed Carpenter Racing	Chevrolet	249	+1 Lap	6	18		17
14	28	(France) Romain Grosjean	Andretti Autosport	Honda	248	Contact	5	11	2	17
15	55	(Denmark) Benjamin Pedersen R	A. J. Foyt Enterprises	Chevrolet	248	+2 Laps	6	13		15
16	12	(Australia) Will Power W	Team Penske	Chevrolet	248	+2 Laps	7	8		14
17	60	(France) Simon Pagenaud	Meyer Shank Racing	Honda	247	+3 Laps	6	22		13
18	30	(United Kingdom) Jack Harvey	Rahal Letterman Lanigan Racing	Honda	247	+3 Laps	6	28		12
19	45	(Denmark) Christian Lundgaard	Rahal Letterman Lanigan Racing	Honda	247	+3 Laps	6	27		11
20	20	(United States) Conor Daly	Ed Carpenter Racing	Chevrolet	246	+4 Laps	7	25		10
21	14	(United States) Santino Ferrucci	A. J. Foyt Enterprises	Chevrolet	246	+4 Laps	7	14		9
22	7	(United States) Alexander Rossi	Arrow McLaren	Chevrolet	243	+7 Laps	7	3		8
23	29	(Canada) Devlin DeFrancesco	Andretti Steinbrenner Autosport	Honda	221	Contact	5	12		7
24	15	(United States) Graham Rahal W	Rahal Letterman Lanigan Racing	Honda	219	Contact	5	24		6
25	51	(United States) Sting Ray Robb R	Dale Coyne Racing with Rick Ware Racing	Honda	208	Contact	4	23	1	6
26	6	(Sweden) Felix Rosenqvist	Arrow McLaren	Chevrolet	177	Contact	3	1	4	7
27	27	(United States) Kyle Kirkwood	Andretti Autosport	Honda	97	Contact	1	20		5
28	11	(Japan) Takuma Sato	Chip Ganassi Racing	Honda	46	Contact		6		5
Fastest lap: (Mexico) Pato O'Ward (Arrow McLaren) – 00:23.4475 (lap 118)

== Championship standings after the race ==
Drivers' Championship standings

	Pos.	Driver	Points
1	1	(Mexico) Pato O'Ward	82
1	2	(Sweden) Marcus Ericsson	75
Unchanged	3	(New Zealand) Scott Dixon	67
14	4	(United States) Josef Newgarden	66
3	5	(Spain) Álex Palou	60

Engine manufacturer standings

	Pos.	Manufacturer	Points
1	1	Chevrolet	168
1	2	Honda	158

- Note: Only the top five positions are included.

Previous race: 2023 Firestone Grand Prix of St. Petersburg	IndyCar Series; 2023 season	Next race: 2023 Acura Grand Prix of Long Beach
Previous race: 2022 XPEL 375	PPG 375	Next race: N/A (race dropped)
