= 2023 Honda Indy Toronto =

Indycar race held in Toronto, Ontario

(Canada) 2023 Honda Indy Toronto
Race details
10th round of the 2023 IndyCar season
← Previous race	Next race →
- Layout of the Exhibition Place circuit
- Date: July 16, 2023
- Official name: Honda Indy Toronto
- Location: Exhibition Place, Toronto, Ontario, Canada
- Course: Temporary road course 1.786 mi / 2.874 km
- Distance: 85 laps 151.81 mi / 244.314 km

Pole position
- Driver: (Denmark) Christian Lundgaard (Rahal Letterman Lanigan Racing)
- Time: 01:04.1567

Fastest lap
- Driver: (Denmark) Christian Lundgaard (Rahal Letterman Lanigan Racing)
- Time: 1:01.2182 (on lap 13 of 85)

Podium
- First: (Denmark) Christian Lundgaard (Rahal Letterman Lanigan Racing)
- Second: (Spain) Álex Palou (Chip Ganassi Racing)
- Third: (United States) Colton Herta (Andretti Autosport)

Chronology
Previous	Next
2022	2024

The 2023 Honda Indy Toronto was the tenth round of the 2023 IndyCar season. The race was held on July 16, 2023, in Toronto, Ontario, Canada at the Exhibition Place circuit. The race consisted of 85 laps and was won by Christian Lundgaard, his first ever IndyCar Series win.

== Entry list ==
Key	Meaning
R	Rookie
W	Past winner

No.	Driver	Team	Engine
2	(United States) Josef Newgarden W	Team Penske	Chevrolet
3	(New Zealand) Scott McLaughlin	Team Penske	Chevrolet
5	(Mexico) Patricio O'Ward	Arrow McLaren	Chevrolet
06	(Brazil) Hélio Castroneves	Meyer Shank Racing	Honda
6	(Sweden) Felix Rosenqvist	Arrow McLaren	Chevrolet
7	(United States) Alexander Rossi	Arrow McLaren	Chevrolet
8	(Sweden) Marcus Ericsson	Chip Ganassi Racing	Honda
9	(New Zealand) Scott Dixon W	Chip Ganassi Racing	Honda
10	(Spain) Álex Palou	Chip Ganassi Racing	Honda
11	(New Zealand) Marcus Armstrong R	Chip Ganassi Racing	Honda
12	(Australia) Will Power W	Team Penske	Chevrolet
14	(United States) Santino Ferrucci	A.J. Foyt Enterprises	Chevrolet
15	(United States) Graham Rahal	Rahal Letterman Lanigan Racing	Honda
18	(United States) David Malukas	Dale Coyne Racing with HMD Motorsports	Honda
20	(United States) Ryan Hunter-Reay W	Ed Carpenter Racing	Chevrolet
21	(Netherlands) Rinus VeeKay	Ed Carpenter Racing	Chevrolet
26	(United States) Colton Herta	Andretti Autosport with Curb-Agajanian	Honda
27	(United States) Kyle Kirkwood	Andretti Autosport	Honda
28	(France) Romain Grosjean	Andretti Autosport	Honda
29	(Canada) Devlin DeFrancesco	Andretti Steinbrenner Autosport	Honda
30	(United Kingdom) Jack Harvey	Rahal Letterman Lanigan Racing	Honda
45	(Denmark) Christian Lundgaard	Rahal Letterman Lanigan Racing	Honda
51	(United States) Sting Ray Robb R	Dale Coyne Racing with Rick Ware Racing	Honda
55	(Denmark) Benjamin Pedersen R	A.J. Foyt Enterprises	Chevrolet
60	(United Kingdom) Tom Blomqvist R	Meyer Shank Racing	Honda
77	(United Kingdom) Callum Ilott	Juncos Hollinger Racing	Chevrolet
78	(Argentina) Agustín Canapino R	Juncos Hollinger Racing	Chevrolet

== Practice ==
=== Practice 1 ===
Top Practice Speeds
Pos	No.	Driver	Team	Engine	Lap Time
1	27	(United States) Kyle Kirkwood	Andretti Autosport	Honda	01:00.8075
2	28	(France) Romain Grosjean	Andretti Autosport	Honda	01:00.8575
3	6	(Sweden) Felix Rosenqvist	Arrow McLaren	Chevrolet	01:00.8607

=== Practice 2 ===
Top Practice Speeds
Pos	No.	Driver	Team	Engine	Lap Time
1	26	(United States) Colton Herta	Andretti Autosport with Curb-Agajanian	Honda	01:00.5657
2	27	(United States) Kyle Kirkwood	Andretti Autosport	Honda	01:00.5972
3	8	(Sweden) Marcus Ericsson	Chip Ganassi Racing	Honda	01:00.6350

== Qualifying ==
=== Qualifying classification ===
Pos	No.	Driver	Team	Engine	Time				Final grid
Pos	No.	Driver	Team	Engine	Round 1		Round 2	Round 3	Final grid
Pos	No.	Driver	Team	Engine	Group 1	Group 2	Round 2	Round 3	Final grid
1	45	(Denmark) Christian Lundgaard	Rahal Letterman Lanigan Racing	Honda	01:01.2205	N/A	01:11.6498	**01:04.1567**	1
2	3	(New Zealand) Scott McLaughlin	Team Penske	Chevrolet	01:01.4651	N/A	01:12.0354	01:04.4790	2
3	5	(Mexico) Pato O'Ward	Arrow McLaren	Chevrolet	N/A	01:14.6156	**01:11.3448**	01:04.5500	3
4	8	(Sweden) Marcus Ericsson	Chip Ganassi Racing	Honda	N/A	01:14.0931	01:12.1818	01:04.9091	4
5	6	(Sweden) Felix Rosenqvist	Arrow McLaren	Chevrolet	N/A	01:14.4562	01:11.7609	01:04.9423	5
6	12	(Australia) Will Power **W**	Team Penske	Chevrolet	01:01.3766	N/A	01:12.1995	01:05.0703	6
7	9	(New Zealand) Scott Dixon **W**	Chip Ganassi Racing	Honda	01:01.4546	N/A	01:12.3123	N/A	7
8	27	(United States) Kyle Kirkwood	Andretti Autosport	Honda	**01:00.6453**	N/A	01:12.3316	N/A	8
9	28	(France) Romain Grosjean	Andretti Autosport	Honda	N/A	**01:14.0454**	01:12.5611	N/A	9
10	11	(New Zealand) Marcus Armstrong **R**	Chip Ganassi Racing	Honda	N/A	01:14.8143	01:13.5600	N/A	10
11	2	(United States) Josef Newgarden **W**	Team Penske	Chevrolet	N/A	01:14.2781	01:13.6353	N/A	11
12	21	(Netherlands) Rinus VeeKay	Ed Carpenter Racing	Chevrolet	01:01.1978	N/A	01:15.0226	N/A	12
13	06	(Brazil) Hélio Castroneves	Meyer Shank Racing	Honda	01:01.5325	N/A	N/A	N/A	13
14	26	(United States) Colton Herta	Andretti Autosport with Curb-Agajanian	Honda	N/A	01:14.8356	N/A	N/A	14
15	10	(Spain) Álex Palou	Chip Ganassi Racing	Honda	01:01.6340	N/A	N/A	N/A	15
16	77	(United Kingdom) Callum Ilott	Juncos Hollinger Racing	Chevrolet	N/A	01:14.8759	N/A	N/A	16
17	18	(United States) David Malukas	Dale Coyne Racing with HMD Motorsports	Honda	01:02.0296	N/A	N/A	N/A	17
18	78	(Argentina) Agustín Canapino **R**	Juncos Hollinger Racing	Chevrolet	N/A	01:15.4540	N/A	N/A	18
19	30	(United Kingdom) Jack Harvey	Rahal Letterman Lanigan Racing	Honda	01:02.2035	N/A	N/A	N/A	19
20	60	(United Kingdom) Tom Blomqvist **R**	Meyer Shank Racing	Honda	N/A	01:16.0415	N/A	N/A	20
21	20	(United States) Ryan Hunter-Reay **W**	Ed Carpenter Racing	Chevrolet	01:02.2554	N/A	N/A	N/A	21
22	29	(Canada) Devlin DeFrancesco	Andretti Steinbrenner Autosport	Honda	N/A	01:16.0598	N/A	N/A	22
23	51	(United States) Sting Ray Robb **R**	Dale Coyne Racing with Rick Ware Racing	Honda	01:02.3978	N/A	N/A	N/A	23
24	14	(United States) Santino Ferrucci	A. J. Foyt Enterprises	Chevrolet	N/A	01:16.2870	N/A	N/A	24
25	55	(Denmark) Benjamin Pedersen **R**	A. J. Foyt Enterprises	Chevrolet	01:02.6538	N/A	N/A	N/A	25
26	7	(United States) Alexander Rossi	Arrow McLaren	Chevrolet	N/A	01:18.9856	N/A	N/A	26
27	15	(United States) Graham Rahal	Rahal Letterman Lanigan Racing	Honda	N/A	01:29.3774	N/A	N/A	27

Notes

- **Bold text** indicates fastest time set in session.

== Warmup ==
Top Practice Speeds
Pos	No.	Driver	Team	Engine	Lap Time
1	9	(New Zealand) Scott Dixon W	Chip Ganassi Racing	Honda	01:01.3208
2	27	(United States) Kyle Kirkwood	Andretti Autosport	Honda	01:01.3810
3	2	(United States) Josef Newgarden W	Team Penske	Chevrolet	01:01.6161

== Race ==
The race started at 2:00 PM ET on July 16, 2023.

=== Race classification ===
Pos	No.	Driver	Team	Engine	Laps	Time/Retired	Pit Stops	Grid	Laps Led	Pts.
1	45	(Denmark) Christian Lundgaard	Rahal Letterman Lanigan Racing	Honda	85	01:41:55.8001	2	1	54	54
2	10	(Spain) Álex Palou	Chip Ganassi Racing	Honda	85	+11.7893	2	15		40
3	26	(United States) Colton Herta	Andretti Autosport with Curb-Agajanian	Honda	85	+15.0599	2	14		35
4	9	(New Zealand) Scott Dixon W	Chip Ganassi Racing	Honda	85	+15.7600	2	7	2	33
5	2	(United States) Josef Newgarden W	Team Penske	Chevrolet	85	+19.2421	2	11		30
6	3	(New Zealand) Scott McLaughlin	Team Penske	Chevrolet	85	+19.4798	2	2	28	29
7	11	(New Zealand) Marcus Armstrong R	Chip Ganassi Racing	Honda	85	+22.8005	2	10		26
8	5	(Mexico) Pato O'Ward	Arrow McLaren	Chevrolet	85	+23.9982	2	3		24
9	15	(United States) Graham Rahal	Rahal Letterman Lanigan Racing	Honda	85	+26.6884	4	27		22
10	6	(Sweden) Felix Rosenqvist	Arrow McLaren	Chevrolet	85	+28.6024	3	5		20
11	8	(Sweden) Marcus Ericsson	Chip Ganassi Racing	Honda	85	+33.5625	3	4	1	20
12	78	(Argentina) Agustín Canapino R	Juncos Hollinger Racing	Chevrolet	85	+35.2616	2	18		18
13	21	(Netherlands) Rinus VeeKay	Ed Carpenter Racing	Chevrolet	85	+35.6375	2	12		17
14	12	(Australia) Will Power W	Team Penske	Chevrolet	85	+36.3467	3	6		16
15	27	(United States) Kyle Kirkwood	Andretti Autosport	Honda	85	+37.1611	4	8		15
16	7	(United States) Alexander Rossi	Arrow McLaren	Chevrolet	84	+1 Lap	3	26		14
17	14	(United States) Santino Ferrucci	A. J. Foyt Enterprises	Chevrolet	82	+3 Laps	6	24		13
18	77	(United Kingdom) Callum Ilott	Juncos Hollinger Racing	Chevrolet	81	Contact	4	16		12
19	51	(United States) Sting Ray Robb R	Dale Coyne Racing with Rick Ware Racing	Honda	81	+4 Laps	3	23		11
20	18	(United States) David Malukas	Dale Coyne Racing with HMD Motorsports	Honda	69	Contact	3	17		10
21	06	(Brazil) Hélio Castroneves	Meyer Shank Racing	Honda	45	Contact	1	13		9
22	28	(France) Romain Grosjean	Andretti Autosport	Honda	41	Contact	1	9		8
23	29	(Canada) Devlin DeFrancesco	Andretti Steinbrenner Autosport	Honda	10	Mechanical		22		7
24	30	(United Kingdom) Jack Harvey	Rahal Letterman Lanigan Racing	Honda	0	Contact		19		6
25	60	(United Kingdom) Tom Blomqvist R	Meyer Shank Racing	Honda	0	Contact		20		5
26	20	(United States) Ryan Hunter-Reay W	Ed Carpenter Racing	Chevrolet	0	Contact		21		5
27	55	(Denmark) Benjamin Pedersen R	A. J. Foyt Enterprises	Chevrolet	0	Contact		25		5
Fastest lap: (Denmark) Christian Lundgaard (Rahal Letterman Lanigan Racing) – 01:01.2182 (lap 13)

== Championship standings after the race ==
Drivers' Championship standings

	Pos.	Driver	Points
Unchanged	1	(Spain) Álex Palou	417
Unchanged	2	(New Zealand) Scott Dixon	300
Unchanged	3	(United States) Josef Newgarden	291
Unchanged	4	(Sweden) Marcus Ericsson	275
Unchanged	5	(Mexico) Pato O'Ward	274

Engine manufacturer standings

	Pos.	Manufacturer	Points
Unchanged	1	Honda	855
Unchanged	2	Chevrolet	751

- Note: Only the top five positions are included.

Previous race: 2023 Honda Indy 200	IndyCar Series; 2023 season	Next race: 2023 Hy-Vee IndyCar Race Weekend
Previous race: 2022 Honda Indy Toronto	Indy Toronto	Next race: 2024 Honda Indy Toronto
