= 2023 Honda Indy 200 =

Indycar race held in Lexington, Ohio

(United States) 2023 Honda Indy 200
Race details
9th round of the 2023 IndyCar season
← Previous race	Next race →
- Layout of the Mid-Ohio Sports Car Course circuit
- Date: July 2, 2023
- Official name: Honda Indy 200 at Mid-Ohio
- Location: Mid-Ohio Sports Car Course, Lexington, Ohio
- Course: Permanent road course 2.258 mi / 3.634 km
- Distance: 80 laps 180.64 mi / 290.71 km

Pole position
- Driver: (United States) Colton Herta (Andretti Autosport with Curb-Agajanian)
- Time: 01:06.3096

Fastest lap
- Driver: (Sweden) Felix Rosenqvist (Arrow McLaren)
- Time: 01:07.9419 (on lap 63 of 80)

Podium
- First: (Spain) Álex Palou (Chip Ganassi Racing)
- Second: (New Zealand) Scott Dixon (Chip Ganassi Racing)
- Third: (Australia) Will Power (Team Penske)

Chronology
Previous	Next
2022	2024

The 2023 Honda Indy 200 at Mid-Ohio presented by the 2023 Accord Hybrid was the ninth round of the 2023 IndyCar season. The race was held on July 2, 2023, in Lexington, Ohio at the Mid-Ohio Sports Car Course. The race consisted of 80 laps. Álex Palou won the race for Chip Ganassi Racing, his third consecutive win of the season.

== Entry list ==
Key	Meaning
R	Rookie
W	Past winner

No.	Driver	Team	Engine
2	(United States) Josef Newgarden W	Team Penske	Chevrolet
3	(New Zealand) Scott McLaughlin W	Team Penske	Chevrolet
5	(Mexico) Patricio O'Ward	Arrow McLaren	Chevrolet
06	(Brazil) Hélio Castroneves W	Meyer Shank Racing	Honda
6	(Sweden) Felix Rosenqvist	Arrow McLaren	Chevrolet
7	(United States) Alexander Rossi W	Arrow McLaren	Chevrolet
8	(Sweden) Marcus Ericsson	Chip Ganassi Racing	Honda
9	(New Zealand) Scott Dixon W	Chip Ganassi Racing	Honda
10	(Spain) Álex Palou	Chip Ganassi Racing	Honda
11	(New Zealand) Marcus Armstrong R	Chip Ganassi Racing	Honda
12	(Australia) Will Power W	Team Penske	Chevrolet
14	(United States) Santino Ferrucci	A.J. Foyt Enterprises	Chevrolet
15	(United States) Graham Rahal W	Rahal Letterman Lanigan Racing	Honda
18	(United States) David Malukas	Dale Coyne Racing with HMD Motorsports	Honda
20	(United States) Ryan Hunter-Reay	Ed Carpenter Racing	Chevrolet
21	(Netherlands) Rinus VeeKay	Ed Carpenter Racing	Chevrolet
26	(United States) Colton Herta W	Andretti Autosport with Curb-Agajanian	Honda
27	(United States) Kyle Kirkwood	Andretti Autosport	Honda
28	(France) Romain Grosjean	Andretti Autosport	Honda
29	(Canada) Devlin DeFrancesco	Andretti Steinbrenner Autosport	Honda
30	(United Kingdom) Jack Harvey	Rahal Letterman Lanigan Racing	Honda
45	(Denmark) Christian Lundgaard	Rahal Letterman Lanigan Racing	Honda
51	(United States) Sting Ray Robb R	Dale Coyne Racing with Rick Ware Racing	Honda
55	(Denmark) Benjamin Pedersen R	A.J. Foyt Enterprises	Chevrolet
60	(France) Simon Pagenaud W	Meyer Shank Racing	Honda
60	(United States) Conor Daly (Note: Simon Pagenaud was unable to take part in the race after not being cleared by the medical team following his crash in Practice 2. Conor Daly took his place for the race, starting from the back of the grid (27th).)	Meyer Shank Racing	Honda
77	(United Kingdom) Callum Ilott	Juncos Hollinger Racing	Chevrolet
78	(Argentina) Agustín Canapino R	Juncos Hollinger Racing	Chevrolet

== Practice ==
=== Practice 1 ===
Top Practice Speeds
Pos	No.	Driver	Team	Engine	Lap Time
1	5	(Mexico) Pato O'Ward	Arrow McLaren	Chevrolet	01:06.4935
2	10	(Spain) Álex Palou	Chip Ganassi Racing	Honda	01:06.8558
3	8	(Sweden) Marcus Ericsson	Chip Ganassi Racing	Honda	01:06.9779

=== Practice 2 ===
Top Practice Speeds
Pos	No.	Driver	Team	Engine	Lap Time
1	12	(Australia) Will Power W	Team Penske	Chevrolet	01:06.4905
2	10	(Spain) Álex Palou	Chip Ganassi Racing	Honda	01:06.7411
3	26	(United States) Colton Herta W	Andretti Autosport with Curb-Agajanian	Honda	01:06.7791

== Qualifying ==
=== Qualifying classification ===
Pos	No.	Driver	Team	Engine	Time				Final grid
Pos	No.	Driver	Team	Engine	Round 1		Round 2	Round 3	Final grid
Pos	No.	Driver	Team	Engine	Group 1	Group 2	Round 2	Round 3	Final grid
1	26	(United States) Colton Herta **W**	Andretti Autosport with Curb-Agajanian	Honda	N/A	01:05.8599	**01:05.8576**	**01:06.3096**	1
2	15	(United States) Graham Rahal **W**	Rahal Letterman Lanigan Racing	Honda	N/A	01:06.0306	01:05.9336	01:06.3528	2
3	27	(United States) Kyle Kirkwood	Andretti Autosport	Honda	N/A	**01:05.7240**	01:05.9493	01:06.3693	3
4	10	(Spain) Álex Palou	Chip Ganassi Racing	Honda	01:06.0357	N/A	01:05.9845	01:06.4166	4
5	45	(Denmark) Christian Lundgaard	Rahal Letterman Lanigan Racing	Honda	N/A	01:05.8933	01:05.8883	01:06.6277	5
6	9	(New Zealand) Scott Dixon **W**	Chip Ganassi Racing	Honda	N/A	01:05.7760	01:05.9787	01:06.9281	6
7	12	(Australia) Will Power **W**	Team Penske	Chevrolet	N/A	01:05.9838	01:06.1121	N/A	7
8	3	(New Zealand) Scott McLaughlin **W**	Team Penske	Chevrolet	01:06.2026	N/A	01:06.1926	N/A	8
9	8	(Sweden) Marcus Ericsson	Chip Ganassi Racing	Honda	**01:05.9252**	N/A	01:06.2289	N/A	9
10	6	(Sweden) Felix Rosenqvist	Arrow McLaren	Chevrolet	01:06.1887	N/A	01:06.2455	N/A	10
11	30	(United Kingdom) Jack Harvey	Rahal Letterman Lanigan Racing	Honda	01:06.2900	N/A	01:06.7309	N/A	11
12	18	(United States) David Malukas	Dale Coyne Racing with HMD Motorsports	Honda	01:06.5621	N/A	01:06.7596	N/A	12
13	7	(United States) Alexander Rossi **W**	Arrow McLaren	Chevrolet	01:06.6010	N/A	N/A	N/A	13
14	28	(France) Romain Grosjean	Andretti Autosport	Honda	N/A	01:06.1870	N/A	N/A	14
15	2	(United States) Josef Newgarden **W**	Team Penske	Chevrolet	01:06.6307	N/A	N/A	N/A	15
16	21	(Netherlands) Rinus VeeKay	Ed Carpenter Racing	Chevrolet	N/A	01:06.2891	N/A	N/A	16
17	20	(United States) Ryan Hunter-Reay	Ed Carpenter Racing	Chevrolet	01:07.0095	N/A	N/A	N/A	17
18	11	(New Zealand) Marcus Armstrong **R**	Chip Ganassi Racing	Honda	N/A	01:06.2915	N/A	N/A	18
19	06	(Brazil) Hélio Castroneves **W**	Meyer Shank Racing	Honda	01:07.0503	N/A	N/A	N/A	19
20	77	(United Kingdom) Callum Ilott	Juncos Hollinger Racing	Chevrolet	N/A	01:06.3487	N/A	N/A	20
21	78	(Argentina) Agustín Canapino **R**	Juncos Hollinger Racing	Chevrolet	01:07.0816	N/A	N/A	N/A	21
22	51	(United States) Sting Ray Robb **R**	Dale Coyne Racing with Rick Ware Racing	Honda	N/A	01:06.5157	N/A	N/A	22
23	55	(Denmark) Benjamin Pedersen **R**	A. J. Foyt Enterprises	Chevrolet	01:07.3960	N/A	N/A	N/A	23
24	29	(Canada) Devlin DeFrancesco	Andretti Steinbrenner Autosport	Honda	N/A	01:06.5834	N/A	N/A	24
25	5	(Mexico) Pato O'Ward	Arrow McLaren	Chevrolet	01:11.3655	N/A	N/A	N/A	25
26	14	(United States) Santino Ferrucci	A. J. Foyt Enterprises	Chevrolet	N/A	01:07.2807	N/A	N/A	26
27	60	(France) Simon Pagenaud **W**	Meyer Shank Racing	Honda	N/A	No Time	N/A	N/A	27

Notes

- **Bold text** indicates fastest time set in session.

== Warmup ==
Top Practice Speeds
Pos	No.	Driver	Team	Engine	Lap Time
1	15	(United States) Graham Rahal W	Rahal Letterman Lanigan Racing	Honda	01:08.4255
2	9	(New Zealand) Scott Dixon W	Chip Ganassi Racing	Honda	01:08.5916
3	18	(United States) David Malukas	Dale Coyne Racing with HMD Motorsports	Honda	01:08.6385

== Race ==
The race started at 1:53 PM ET on July 2, 2023.

=== Race classification ===
Pos	No.	Driver	Team	Engine	Laps	Time/Retired	Pit Stops	Grid	Laps Led	Pts.
1	10	(Spain) Álex Palou	Chip Ganassi Racing	Honda	80	01:37:31.9887	2	4	48	53
2	9	(New Zealand) Scott Dixon W	Chip Ganassi Racing	Honda	80	+5.0242	2	6	2	41
3	12	(Australia) Will Power W	Team Penske	Chevrolet	80	+18.3585	2	7	1	36
4	45	(Denmark) Christian Lundgaard	Rahal Letterman Lanigan Racing	Honda	80	+19.0828	2	5		32
5	3	(New Zealand) Scott McLaughlin W	Team Penske	Chevrolet	80	+20.5280	2	8		30
6	18	(United States) David Malukas	Dale Coyne Racing with HMD Motorsports	Honda	80	+27.1534	2	12		28
7	15	(United States) Graham Rahal W	Rahal Letterman Lanigan Racing	Honda	80	+27.8852	2	2	3	27
8	5	(Mexico) Pato O'Ward	Arrow McLaren	Chevrolet	80	+28.5119	3	25		24
9	11	(New Zealand) Marcus Armstrong R	Chip Ganassi Racing	Honda	80	+42.4021	2	18		22
10	7	(United States) Alexander Rossi W	Arrow McLaren	Chevrolet	80	+49.1483	3	13		20
11	26	(United States) Colton Herta W	Andretti Autosport with Curb-Agajanian	Honda	80	+55.5968	3	1	26	21
12	2	(United States) Josef Newgarden W	Team Penske	Chevrolet	80	+56.1804	2	15		18
13	28	(France) Romain Grosjean	Andretti Autosport	Honda	80	+1:00.3705	2	14		17
14	29	(Canada) Devlin DeFrancesco	Andretti Steinbrenner Autosport	Honda	80	+1:02.8906	2	24		16
15	21	(Netherlands) Rinus VeeKay	Ed Carpenter Racing	Chevrolet	80	+1:03.4295	2	16		15
16	77	(United Kingdom) Callum Ilott	Juncos Hollinger Racing	Chevrolet	80	+1:03.8682	2	20		14
17	27	(United States) Kyle Kirkwood	Andretti Autosport	Honda	80	+1:04.4020	2	3		13
18	30	(United Kingdom) Jack Harvey	Rahal Letterman Lanigan Racing	Honda	80	+1:08.0817	2	11		12
19	20	(United States) Ryan Hunter-Reay	Ed Carpenter Racing	Chevrolet	80	+1:09.3717	2	17		11
20	60	(United States) Conor Daly	Meyer Shank Racing	Honda	80	+1:10.1361	3	27		10
21	06	(Brazil) Hélio Castroneves W	Meyer Shank Racing	Honda	79	+1 Lap	2	19		9
22	51	(United States) Sting Ray Robb R	Dale Coyne Racing with Rick Ware Racing	Honda	79	+1 Lap	2	22		8
23	78	(Argentina) Agustín Canapino R	Juncos Hollinger Racing	Chevrolet	79	+1 Lap	2	21		7
24	14	(United States) Santino Ferrucci	A. J. Foyt Enterprises	Chevrolet	79	+1 Lap	3	26		6
25	6	(Sweden) Felix Rosenqvist	Arrow McLaren	Chevrolet	79	+1 Lap	3	10		5
26	55	(Denmark) Benjamin Pedersen R	A. J. Foyt Enterprises	Chevrolet	79	+1 Lap	3	23		5
27	8	(Sweden) Marcus Ericsson	Chip Ganassi Racing	Honda	5	Contact	2	9		5
Fastest lap: (Sweden) Felix Rosenqvist (Arrow McLaren) – 01:07.9419 (lap 63)

== Championship standings after the race ==
Drivers' Championship standings

	Pos.	Driver	Points
Unchanged	1	(Spain) Álex Palou	377
3	2	(New Zealand) Scott Dixon	267
Unchanged	3	(United States) Josef Newgarden	261
2	4	(Sweden) Marcus Ericsson	255
1	5	(Mexico) Pato O'Ward	250

Engine manufacturer standings

	Pos.	Manufacturer	Points
Unchanged	1	Honda	759
Unchanged	2	Chevrolet	693

- Note: Only the top five positions are included.

== Footnotes ==
Previous race: 2023 Sonsio Grand Prix at Road America	NTT IndyCar Series; 2023 season	Next race: 2023 Honda Indy Toronto
Previous race: 2022 Honda Indy 200	Honda Indy 200 at Mid-Ohio	Next race: 2024 Honda Indy 200
