= 2023 IndyCar Series =

American auto racing season

2023 IndyCar season
- NTT IndyCar Series

Season
- Races: 17
- Start date: March 5
- End date: September 10

Awards
- Drivers' champion: (Spain) Álex Palou
- Manufacturers' Cup: (United States) Chevrolet
- Rookie of the Year: (New Zealand) Marcus Armstrong
- Indianapolis 500 winner: (United States) Josef Newgarden

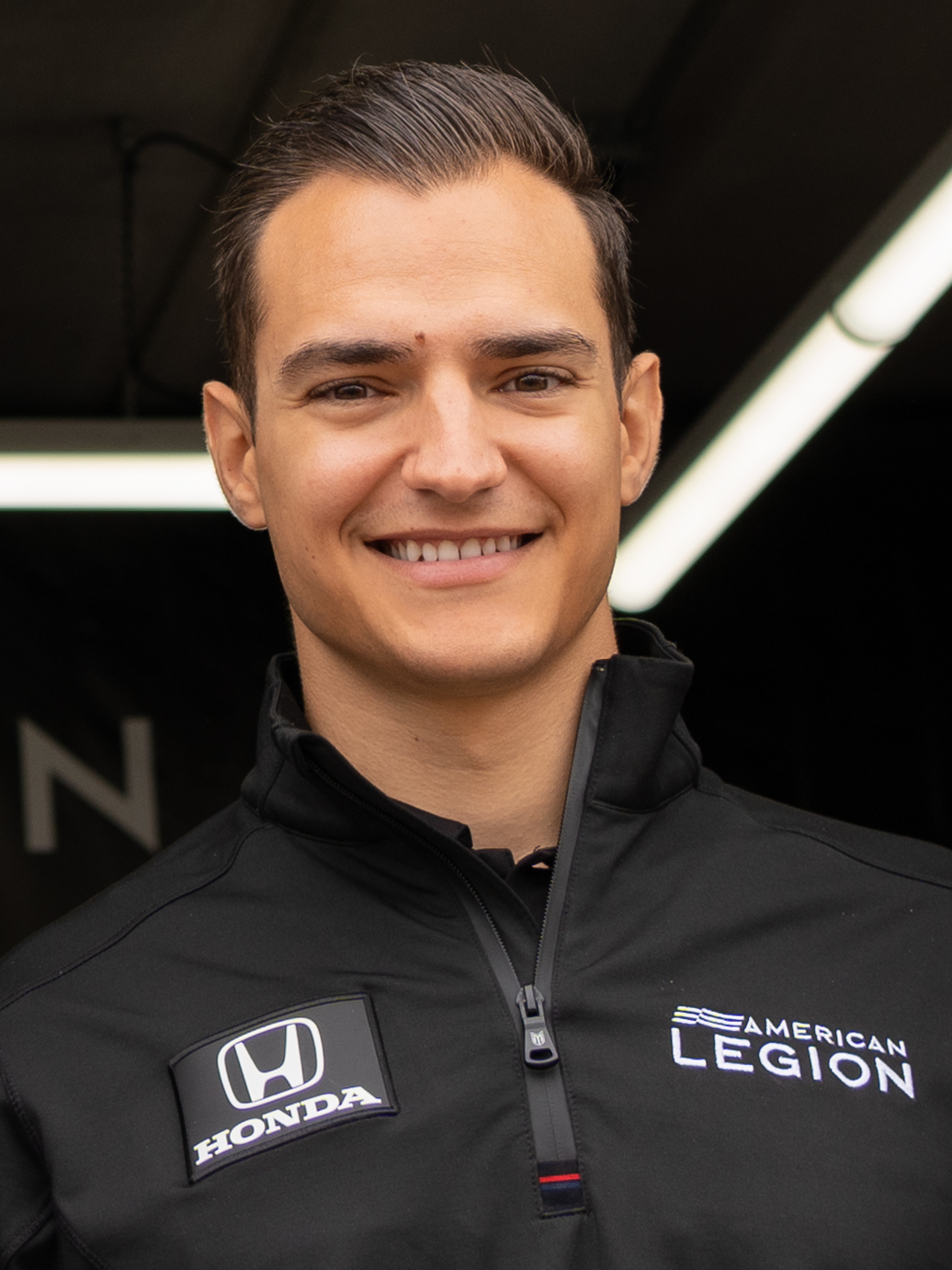
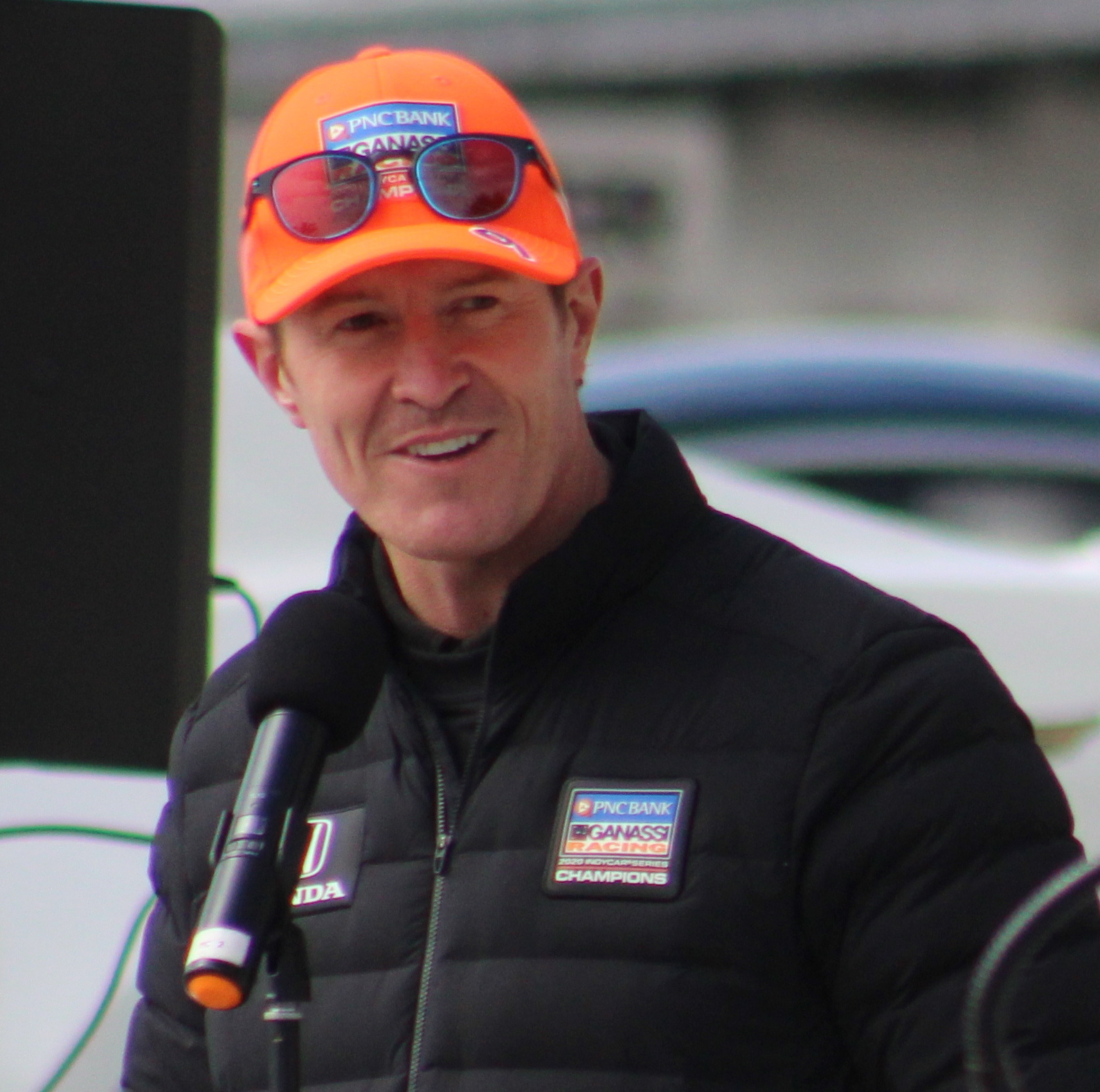
Álex Palou (left) won the IndyCar Series championship for the second time; Scott Dixon (right) finished second in points.

The 2023 NTT IndyCar Series was the 112th official championship season of American open-wheel racing and the 28th season under IndyCar Series sanction. The showcase event was the 107th Indianapolis 500, which was won by Josef Newgarden.

Álex Palou, driving for Chip Ganassi Racing, won his second championship, with his first coming in 2021. The victory was also the 15th for Chip Ganassi Racing. Palou secured the championship at the penultimate round of the season in Portland, the first time a driver had won the championship before the season finale since Sébastien Bourdais' championship victory in the 2007 Champ Car World Series.

== Background and series news ==
Will Power of Team Penske entered the season as the reigning drivers' champion, having won the title at the final round in Laguna Seca by 16 points over his teammate Josef Newgarden. Defending Indianapolis 500 winner Marcus Ericsson entered 2023 in a contract year for Chip Ganassi Racing. In February 2023, 2013 Indianapolis 500 winner and 2004 IndyCar Series champion Tony Kanaan announced that he would retire from IndyCar after the Indianapolis 500.

The 2023 season saw several marketing changes intended to increase domestic viewership of the series. On December 8, 2022, the CW Network announced a reality documentary series titled 100 Days to Indy, which would premiere on April 27, 2023. Produced by Vice Media, Penske Entertainment president Mark Miles noted that Penske Entertainment would receive some monetary compensation in return for facilitating behind-the-scenes access. In February 2023, it was confirmed that the series organizer, Penske Entertainment Corp., planned for a marketing budget of approximately US$17 million focusing on 20 markets deemed important by series leadership. In February 2023, it was reported by Marshall Pruett of Racer.com that the annual Leader's Circle contracts earned by entries which compete in the full season would be reduced by $150,000 each to a value of $910,000. The money was allocated towards the Series' marketing budget.

In addition to these changes by the series, new sponsorships were announced including that British oil and gas company Shell would replace Speedway LLC as an official fuel partner and supplier, with the series introducing a 100% renewable fuel and thus marked for the second time the series utilized the non-American oil and gas company since 2007 Champ Car World Series season when French oil company Elf Aquitaine supplied a Methanol fuel to all entrants.

On February 2, 2023, the championship's sanctioning body announced that the Indianapolis 500 would no longer be a double points-paying race, ending a rule that was first established in 2014.

In addition to criticism about series marketing faced after the 2022 season, Penske Entertainment faced criticism when 2022 Indy Lights champion Linus Lundqvist was unable to obtain a seat for the 2023 IndyCar season. In response to this, PEC added $350,000 to the champions advancement prize for the now-renamed 2023 Indy NXT. Lundqvist would later make his IndyCar debut as a mid-season injury substitute at Nashville.

The series' tire supplier Firestone announced the expanded use of tires made from guayule rubber as the "alternate" tire (which must be used for at least two green-flag laps every race) for all street circuit races, and introduced alternate tires on an oval for the first time at WWTR.

The 2023 season was scheduled to be the final season using the current 2.2-liter V6 twin-turbocharged engine formula that made its debut in the 2012 season. A new 2.4-liter V6 twin-turbocharged hybrid engine formula was meant to debut in the series from 2024 onwards. However, on December 6, 2022, it was announced that these plans would be put on hold and the hybrid technology will instead be implemented on the current 2.2-liter engines for 2024.

== Confirmed entries ==
The following teams, entries, and drivers competed in the 2023 NTT IndyCar Series season. All teams used a spec Dallara IR18 chassis with universal aero kit and Firestone tires.

Team	Engine	No.	Driver(s)	Round(s)
Abel Motorsports	Chevrolet	50	(United States) R. C. Enerson R	6
A. J. Foyt Enterprises (Note: Technical partnership with Team Penske from round 15 onwards.)	Chevrolet	14	(United States) Santino Ferrucci	All
A. J. Foyt Enterprises	Chevrolet	55	(Denmark) Benjamin Pedersen R	All
Andretti Autosport with Curb-Agajanian	Honda	26	(United States) Colton Herta	All
Andretti Autosport	Honda	27	(United States) Kyle Kirkwood	All
Andretti Autosport	Honda	28	(France) Romain Grosjean	All
Andretti Steinbrenner Autosport	Honda	29	(Canada) Devlin DeFrancesco	All
Andretti Herta Autosport with Marco Andretti and Curb-Agajanian	Honda	98	(United States) Marco Andretti	6
Arrow McLaren	Chevrolet	5	(Mexico) Pato O'Ward	All
Arrow McLaren	Chevrolet	6	(Sweden) Felix Rosenqvist	All
Arrow McLaren	Chevrolet	7	(United States) Alexander Rossi	All
Arrow McLaren	Chevrolet	66	(Brazil) Tony Kanaan	6
Chip Ganassi Racing	Honda	8	(Sweden) Marcus Ericsson	All
Chip Ganassi Racing	Honda	9	(New Zealand) Scott Dixon	All
Chip Ganassi Racing	Honda	10	(Spain) Álex Palou	All
Chip Ganassi Racing	Honda	11	(New Zealand) Marcus Armstrong R	1, 3–5, 7–10, 13–14, 16–17
Chip Ganassi Racing	Honda	11	(Japan) Takuma Sato	2, 6, 11–12, 15
Dale Coyne Racing with HMD Motorsports	Honda	18	(United States) David Malukas	All
Dale Coyne Racing with Rick Ware Racing	Honda	51	(United States) Sting Ray Robb R	All
Dreyer & Reinbold Racing	Chevrolet	23	(United States) Ryan Hunter-Reay	6
Dreyer & Reinbold Racing / Cusick Motorsports	Chevrolet	24	(United Kingdom) Stefan Wilson R	6
Dreyer & Reinbold Racing / Cusick Motorsports	Chevrolet	24	(United States) Graham Rahal	6
Ed Carpenter Racing	Chevrolet	20	(United States) Conor Daly	1–7
Ed Carpenter Racing	Chevrolet	20	(United States) Ryan Hunter-Reay	8–17
Ed Carpenter Racing	Chevrolet	21	(Netherlands) Rinus VeeKay	All
Ed Carpenter Racing	Chevrolet	33	(United States) Ed Carpenter	2, 6, 11–12, 15
Juncos Hollinger Racing	Chevrolet	77	(United Kingdom) Callum Ilott	All
Juncos Hollinger Racing	Chevrolet	78	(Argentina) Agustín Canapino R	All
Meyer Shank Racing (Note: Technical partnership with Andretti Autosport.)	Honda	06	(Brazil) Hélio Castroneves	All
Meyer Shank Racing	Honda	60	(France) Simon Pagenaud	1–9
Meyer Shank Racing	Honda	60	(United States) Conor Daly	9, 11–12
Meyer Shank Racing	Honda	60	(United Kingdom) Tom Blomqvist R	10, 16–17
Meyer Shank Racing	Honda	60	(Sweden) Linus Lundqvist R	13–15
Rahal Letterman Lanigan Racing	Honda	15	(United States) Graham Rahal	All
Rahal Letterman Lanigan Racing	Honda	30	(United Kingdom) Jack Harvey	1–14
Rahal Letterman Lanigan Racing	Honda	30	(United States) Conor Daly	15
Rahal Letterman Lanigan Racing	Honda	30	(Estonia) Jüri Vips R	16–17
Rahal Letterman Lanigan Racing	Honda	44	(United Kingdom) Katherine Legge	6
Rahal Letterman Lanigan Racing	Honda	45	(Denmark) Christian Lundgaard	All
Team Penske	Chevrolet	2	(United States) Josef Newgarden	All
Team Penske	Chevrolet	3	(New Zealand) Scott McLaughlin	All
Team Penske	Chevrolet	12	(Australia) Will Power	All

R Eligible for Rookie of the Year

=== Álex Palou contract dispute ===
On July 12, 2022, Chip Ganassi Racing sent a press release saying that they had extended the contract of Álex Palou for the 2023 IndyCar season by exercising the option they held on his deal. Included in the press release was a quote attributed to Palou. Hours later, Palou, via a thread on Twitter denounced this press release, claimed that the quote attributed to him was created by the team (a practice common among IndyCar teams, according to RACER.com's Marshall Pruett) and also not approved by him. He also stated that he had given Chip Ganassi Racing prior notice that he intended to leave the team after the 2022 season and join McLaren Racing's roster of drivers. Moments after these tweets, McLaren announced that they had signed Palou to a contract for 2023, though it was not specifically mentioned if Palou would drive for Arrow McLaren SP, McLaren's IndyCar operation. Chip Ganassi Racing responded to this by releasing a statement reiterating their claim to Palou's services. On July 27, 2022, Chip Ganassi Racing confirmed they had filed a civil lawsuit against Palou in Marion County, Indiana. On September 14, 2022, it was announced that an agreement had been reached by all parties that would see Palou continue with Chip Ganassi for the 2023 season, and McLaren subsequently confirmed Felix Rosenqvist would be returning to AMSP.

=== Driver changes ===
==== Preseason ====
- On June 2, 2022, Arrow McLaren SP confirmed the signing of Alexander Rossi for 2023 in a third entry. He departed Andretti Autosport after seven years with the team.
- On June 6, 2022, Andretti Autosport announced that 2021 Indy Lights champion Kyle Kirkwood would replace Rossi in the No. 27 entry, switching from A. J. Foyt Racing.
- On September 26, 2022, Jimmie Johnson announced that he would step back from racing on a full-time basis. Johnson had competed full-time in the 2022 season for Chip Ganassi Racing.
- On September 28, 2022, A. J. Foyt Racing confirmed the signing of Benjamin Pedersen to a multi-year contract. The Danish-American moved up from Indy Lights where he finished 5th in the championship with 1 win in 2022.
- On October 6, 2022, A. J. Foyt Racing confirmed they had signed Santino Ferrucci to drive the No. 14 entry. Ferrucci spent 2022 driving in two races as an injury substitute, the Indianapolis 500 for Dreyer & Reinbold Racing, and two NASCAR Xfinity Series races.
- On October 11, 2022, Dalton Kellett announced that he would not be returning to A. J. Foyt Racing after three seasons with the team. Kellett had met with the team earlier to discuss running a third entry after the signing of Ferrucci and Pedersen.
- On November 1, 2022, Arrow McLaren SP confirmed that Tony Kanaan would drive a fourth entry for the team at the Indianapolis 500. Kanaan moves from Chip Ganassi Racing, where he finished 3rd in the race in 2022.
- On November 17, 2022, Dreyer & Reinbold Racing announced that it had formed a partnership with Cusick Motorsports to field their driver Stefan Wilson in DRR's No. 24 entry in the Indianapolis 500. Wilson replaces Sage Karam, who ran the Indianapolis 500 the last seven years for DRR.
- On December 2, 2022, Chip Ganassi Racing announced that they had signed Marcus Armstrong to race the road and street course races in its No. 11 entry. Armstrong moved over from Hitech Grand Prix in the FIA Formula 2 Championship, where he won 3 races in 2022. The entry replaced the No. 48 entry driven by Johnson. On January 17, 2023, Takuma Sato was announced to join CGR to drive in "oval competition", including the Indianapolis 500. He left Dale Coyne Racing after one season with the team. On March 3, 2023, The Indianapolis Star quoted a clarification by Ganassi that the deal with Sato was only in place for Texas and Indianapolis, with its presence at Iowa and Gateway "to be determined". On June 20, Ganassi confirmed that Sato would compete in all remaining oval races for the season.
- On January 18, 2023, Dale Coyne Racing with Rick Ware Racing confirmed 2022 Indy Lights runner-up Sting Ray Robb as Sato's replacement in the No. 51 entry.

==== Midseason ====
- On March 15, 2023, Dreyer & Reinbold Racing announced that 2014 Indianapolis 500 winner Ryan Hunter-Reay will drive the No. 23 entry in the Indianapolis 500.
- On May 22, 2023, Dreyer & Reinbold Racing / Cusick Motorsports driver Stefan Wilson was injured in a crash during practice for the Indianapolis 500 and was not medically cleared to continue in the event. On May 23, Graham Rahal, whose regular Rahal Letterman Lanigan Racing entry was bumped from the field, was confirmed as Wilson's injury replacement.
- On June 7, 2023, Ed Carpenter Racing confirmed that it had parted ways with driver Conor Daly. The following day, the team announced that Ryan Hunter-Reay had been signed to drive the No. 20 through the remainder of the season.
- On July 2, 2023, Meyer Shank Racing driver Simon Pagenaud was not medically cleared to race following a crash in practice the previous day at Mid-Ohio. Conor Daly was confirmed to substitute for Pagenaud for the race at Mid-Ohio and for the doubleheader rounds at Iowa. MSR IMSA driver Tom Blomqvist substituted at Toronto, making his IndyCar debut. 2022 Indy Lights champion Linus Lundqvist substituted at Nashville (also making his IndyCar debut), the second Indy Road Course Race and the race at WWTR. On August 28, it was confirmed that Pagenaud wouldn't return to the No. 60 for the rest of the season, and Blomqvist will be subbing at the last two rounds of the season at Portland & Laguna Seca.
- On August 15, 2023, Rahal Letterman Lanigan Racing announced that it had parted ways with driver Jack Harvey and would use the final 3 races of the season to evaluate other talent, starting with Conor Daly for the following race at WWTR. On August 28, 2023, it was announced that former FIA Formula 2 driver Jüri Vips would run in the No. 30 for the final two races of the year at Portland and Laguna Seca.

=== Team changes ===
==== Preseason ====
- On September 7, 2022, Juncos Hollinger Racing announced that they would expand to two entries. On January 12, 2023, they confirmed Agustín Canapino as the full-time driver of the No. 78.
- On September 20, 2022, Taylor Kiel announced that he was leaving his role as president of Arrow McLaren SP on his own volition with immediate effect.
- On September 23, 2022, Arrow McLaren SP confirmed they had hired Brian Barnhart in a to-be-defined role. On October 4, the team announced Barnhart's role would be general manager, while also naming Gavin Ward to the position of race director, splitting the duties of former president Kiel. Barnhart departed Andretti Autosport after serving as race strategist for James Hinchcliffe and Alexander Rossi.
- On October 31, 2022, Rahal Letterman Lanigan Racing co-owner Bobby Rahal told Racer.com's Marshall Pruett that the team will run a fourth entry at the Indianapolis 500. On February 9, 2023, the team confirmed that Katherine Legge will drive the No. 44 entry, making her first IndyCar Series appearance since 2013.
- On November 15, 2022, Chip Ganassi Racing's managing director Mike Hull told Racer.com's Marshall Pruett that the team had hired Taylor Kiel (Hull's stepson) as team manager, filling a void left by promoting Mike O'Gara to run the team's sports car racing entries.
- On November 23, 2022, Rahal Letterman Lanigan Racing announced a driver swap amongst their Nos. 30 and 45 entries. Christian Lundgaard would drive the No. 45 and Jack Harvey the No. 30 with the change being done for sponsorship reasons.
- On December 12, 2022, Arrow McLaren SP announced a rebrand that would take effect for the 2023 season, removing the "SP" wordmark to become "Arrow McLaren".
- On January 19, 2023, A. J. Foyt Racing initially confirmed that Benjamin Pedersen would drive the No. 88 entry, having left out a number in Pedersen's confirmation announcement and choosing the number in honor of owner A. J. Foyt's 88th birthday. However, on January 27, 2023, the team released a statement saying that Pedersen would drive the No. 55 after they were made aware of an ideological connotation to the combination of entries numbered "14" and "88".

==== Midseason ====
- On August 22, 2023, A. J. Foyt Racing and Team Penske confirmed the formation of a technical alliance, with the Foyt team using Penske-supplied dampers and engineering support beginning at WWTR, with future plans for Penske to assign younger crew-people and engineers and development drivers within the Foyt team.

== Schedule ==
The schedule was released on September 27, 2022. In October 2022, IndyCar announced three open tests for the 2023 season.

Icon	Legend
O	Oval/Speedway
R	Road course
S	Street circuit

Rd.	Date	Race name	Track	Location
1	March 5	Firestone Grand Prix of St. Petersburg presented by RP Funding	S Streets of St. Petersburg	St. Petersburg, Florida
2	April 2	PPG 375	O Texas Motor Speedway	Fort Worth, Texas
3	April 16	Acura Grand Prix of Long Beach	S Streets of Long Beach	Long Beach, California
4	April 30	Children's of Alabama Indy Grand Prix	R Barber Motorsports Park	Birmingham, Alabama
5	May 13	GMR Grand Prix	R Indianapolis Motor Speedway Road Course	Speedway, Indiana
6	May 28	107th Running of the Indianapolis 500 presented by Gainbridge	O Indianapolis Motor Speedway	Speedway, Indiana
7	June 4	Chevrolet Detroit Grand Prix presented by Lear	S Streets of Detroit	Detroit, Michigan
8	June 18	Sonsio Grand Prix at Road America presented by AMR	R Road America	Elkhart Lake, Wisconsin
9	July 2	Honda Indy 200 at Mid-Ohio presented by the 2023 Accord Hybrid	R Mid-Ohio Sports Car Course	Lexington, Ohio
10	July 16	Honda Indy Toronto	S Exhibition Place	Toronto, Ontario
11	July 22	Hy-Vee Homefront 250 presented by Instacart	O Iowa Speedway	Newton, Iowa
12	July 23	Hy-Vee One Step 250 presented by Gatorade	O Iowa Speedway	Newton, Iowa
13	August 6	Big Machine Music City Grand Prix	S Nashville Street Circuit	Nashville, Tennessee
14	August 12	Gallagher Grand Prix	R Indianapolis Motor Speedway Road Course	Speedway, Indiana
15	August 27	Bommarito Automotive Group 500	O World Wide Technology Raceway	Madison, Illinois
16	September 3	BitNile.com Grand Prix of Portland	R Portland International Raceway	Portland, Oregon
17	September 10	Firestone Grand Prix of Monterey	R WeatherTech Raceway Laguna Seca	Monterey, California

== Results ==
Rd.	Race	Pole position	Fastest lap	Most laps led	Race winner			Report
Rd.	Race	Pole position	Fastest lap	Most laps led	Driver	Team	Manufacturer	Report
1	St. Petersburg	(France) Romain Grosjean	(Spain) Álex Palou	(New Zealand) Scott McLaughlin	(Sweden) Marcus Ericsson	Chip Ganassi Racing	Honda	Report
2	Texas	(Sweden) Felix Rosenqvist	(Mexico) Pato O'Ward	(United States) Josef Newgarden	(United States) Josef Newgarden	Team Penske	Chevrolet	Report
3	Long Beach	(United States) Kyle Kirkwood	(Spain) Álex Palou	(United States) Kyle Kirkwood	(United States) Kyle Kirkwood	Andretti Autosport	Honda	Report
4	Birmingham	(France) Romain Grosjean	(Australia) Will Power	(France) Romain Grosjean	(New Zealand) Scott McLaughlin	Team Penske	Chevrolet	Report
5	IMS GMR GP	(Denmark) Christian Lundgaard	(Spain) Álex Palou	(Spain) Álex Palou	(Spain) Álex Palou	Chip Ganassi Racing	Honda	Report
6	Indianapolis 500	(Spain) Álex Palou	(United States) David Malukas	(Mexico) Pato O'Ward	(United States) Josef Newgarden	Team Penske	Chevrolet	Report
7	Detroit	(Spain) Álex Palou	(United States) Kyle Kirkwood	(Spain) Álex Palou	(Spain) Álex Palou	Chip Ganassi Racing	Honda	Report
8	Road America	(United States) Colton Herta	(Australia) Will Power	(United States) Colton Herta	(Spain) Álex Palou	Chip Ganassi Racing	Honda	Report
9	Mid-Ohio	(United States) Colton Herta	(Sweden) Felix Rosenqvist	(Spain) Álex Palou	(Spain) Álex Palou	Chip Ganassi Racing	Honda	Report
10	Toronto	(Denmark) Christian Lundgaard	(Denmark) Christian Lundgaard	(Denmark) Christian Lundgaard	(Denmark) Christian Lundgaard	Rahal Letterman Lanigan Racing	Honda	Report
11	Iowa 1	(Australia) Will Power	(New Zealand) Scott McLaughlin	(United States) Josef Newgarden	(United States) Josef Newgarden	Team Penske	Chevrolet	Report
12	Iowa 2	(Australia) Will Power	(Australia) Will Power	(United States) Josef Newgarden	(United States) Josef Newgarden	Team Penske	Chevrolet	Report
13	Nashville	(New Zealand) Scott McLaughlin	(Sweden) Linus Lundqvist	(United States) Kyle Kirkwood	(United States) Kyle Kirkwood	Andretti Autosport	Honda	Report
14	IMS Gallagher GP	(United States) Graham Rahal	(United States) Graham Rahal	(United States) Graham Rahal	(New Zealand) Scott Dixon	Chip Ganassi Racing	Honda	Report
15	Gateway	(New Zealand) Scott McLaughlin (Note: McLaughlin, the fastest qualifier, was assessed a 9-place grid penalty for an unapproved engine change. Josef Newgarden, who qualified 2nd, was the highest-placed driver not to have a penalty, and thus started the race from pole position. McLaughlin earned the pole award and the pole-winner's championship point.)	(Sweden) Linus Lundqvist	(New Zealand) Scott Dixon	(New Zealand) Scott Dixon	Chip Ganassi Racing	Honda	Report
16	Portland	(United States) Graham Rahal	(United States) Josef Newgarden	(Spain) Álex Palou	(Spain) Álex Palou	Chip Ganassi Racing	Honda	Report
17	Laguna Seca	(Sweden) Felix Rosenqvist	(Spain) Álex Palou	(Spain) Álex Palou	(New Zealand) Scott Dixon	Chip Ganassi Racing	Honda	Report

== Season report ==
=== Opening rounds ===
The 2023 IndyCar season began around the Streets of St. Petersburg with Andretti's Romain Grosjean taking pole position. A six-car pileup on the opening lap caused a red flag. Grosjean maintained his lead through the first part of the race, ahead of his team-mate Colton Herta, who was the first of the lead group to pit. The pitstops of the alternate tire runners left Penske's Scott McLaughlin in the lead, before he also came in and had a battle with Grosjean that was stopped by a caution caused by ECR's Conor Daly. McLaughlin and Grosjean then gapped the field, before their second stops brought a reiteration of their battle out the pits. This time it ended in tears, though, when McLaughlin locked up his cold tires into turn one, sending both cars into the wall and promoting McLaren's Pato O'Ward into the lead. The Mexican looked set to win the race, before a sudden power issue caused his car to briefly slow, allowing CGR's Marcus Ericsson into the lead to claim the race win ahead of O'Ward and CGR's Scott Dixon.

McLaren's Felix Rosenqvist took pole position for the PPG 375, but quickly fell down to fifth at the start. Penske's Josef Newgarden took the lead ahead of CGR's Scott Dixon and held first place until CGR driver Takuma Sato hit the wall on lap 45. His teammate Álex Palou benefitted, jumping up to second at the restart and managing to take the lead, albeit only for two laps before Newgarden was back in front and O'Ward in second. A round of stops later, O'Ward took the lead on lap 129, before a caution put both leaders into fuel-saving mode. Two more cautions then set up an exciting finish: O'Ward led Palou and Newgarden, with five more cars right behind on the lead lap. Newgarden took the lead on lap 242, before multiple close battles were halted when Grosjean's fight with DCR's David Malukas sent the Frenchman into the wall. Newgarden took the win under yellow flag conditions, while O'Ward had to settle for second ahead of Palou. His two second places still handed O'Ward the championship lead ahead of Ericsson.

The Acura Grand Prix of Long Beach saw Andretti's Kyle Kirkwood lead from pole position, keeping the lead from Ericsson and Grosjean throughout the opening stint. The leaders then pitted under caution after O'Ward's stern defense sent Dixon into the wall. A fast pitstop promoted Newgarden to second place, before carnage ensued on the restart: Agustín Canapino had stayed on track in his Juncos car to claim the lead and acted as a roadblock for Kirkwood as Newgarden jumped past both cars into the lead. But Kirkwood did not lose his cool in second place. He kept close to Newgarden all throughout the next stint, and stayed out one lap longer to complete an overcut and reclaim first place. Grosjean also overcut Newgarden and soon began hassling Kirkwood. Over the final ten laps, Grosjean could not find a way by Kirkwood, and the American clinched his maiden win. Ericsson completed the podium and reclaimed the championship lead, 15 points ahead of O'Ward, who finished down in 17th after his tussle with Dixon.

Round four was held at Barber Motorsports Park, and Grosjean took pole position, while O'Ward took second from Palou at the start. The lead group extended their stints to make the race on two stops, but many cars committed to three-stopping. Newgarden, McLaughlin and McLaren's Alexander Rossi led that strategy. McLaughlin then benefitted from Sting Ray Robb parking his DCR car with an issue, as he was able to stop before the pits were closed. This caution meant both strategies had one more stop to make, with the two-stoppers having to save much more fuel. This put the initiative toward the three-stoppers, with McLaughlin taking the lead coming out the pits. Grosjean pressured him his whole outlap, before squeezing past him. The pair then continued their battle, with McLaughlin eventually coming out on top when Grosjean ran wide on lap 72. Penske's Will Power had started eleventh, but made his strategy work brilliantly to finish third. O'Ward came fourth to reduce the championship lead to only three points.

The month of May began with the GMR Grand Prix. RLL's Christian Lundgaard took pole position, but had to concede the lead to Palou during the opening lap. After the first round of stops, Lundgaard was able to get back ahead, but was then hindered by his teammate Graham Rahal, who had not yet pitted. This allowed Palou to get back in front. O'Ward came into play during the second round of stops, when he stopped one lap earlier and undercut Lundgaard and Palou. Both drivers then got back past him, but Lundgaard was unable to keep up with Palou. The Spaniard pulled a gap to the rest of the field until the final round of stops began. O'Ward managed to overtake Lundgaard shortly before their stops and then stayed out longer to try the overcut on Palou. This did not work, and Palou easily pulled a gap on the rest of the field to win by over 16 seconds. Lundgaard had to cede the final podium position to Rossi, while Ericsson had to cede his championship lead to Palou, who now led O'Ward by six points.

The 107th Running of the Indianapolis 500 began with Palou taking pole position. He and ECR's Rinus VeeKay controlled the early stages of the race, before the two McLarens of O'Ward and Rosenqvist took the first two spots. During the next round of pit stops, happening under caution, VeeKay drifted into Palou's car, eliminating both from contention. The McLarens swapped the lead every three laps to save fuel, with O'Ward eventually in front, before Rosenqvist hit the wall and clipped Kirkwood, flipping him and sending him into the wall hard. The race was stopped, and only one lap after the restart the red flags were out again when O'Ward tried to attack Ericsson for the lead and also crashed. The second restart also only lasted one lap before another multi-car accident, leaving the field with a one-lap shootout for the win. There, Newgarden got past Ericsson to win the Indy 500, with Foyt's Santino Ferrucci in third. The late restart drew criticism from media and fans, with some calling it farcical.

=== Mid-season rounds ===
The Detroit Grand Prix was moved back to downtown Detroit, and Palou took pole position on the new circuit. Juncos's Callum Ilott crashed into Kirkwood in the first corner, while Grosjean was able to move up to second. Power was the next to make moves in the lead group, having risen up to second by lap 22. The leading pair traded the lead during their stops, but Palou was back in front by lap 40. Both O'Ward and Newgarden dropped out of contention after issues during their pit stops. After two back-to-back cautions, Power claimed the lead when Palou had an electronic issue during the restart. Palou then pressured Power until the latter made a mistake on lap 66 and dropped back to second. Two more cautions did not trouble Palou, while Power was clipped by Dixon, initially dropping him back, but he was able to come through again to finish second. Rosenqvist claimed second place on the penultimate round. Palou's win allowed him to extend his championship lead ahead of Newgarden in second.

Herta started the Grand Prix at Road America on pole position and maintained his lead ahead of Palou and O'Ward, before the latter dropped down and promoted CGR's Marcus Armstrong to third. This order remained until the first round of stops, under caution, where Newgarden overtook Armstrong in the pit lane. He then got into second when Palou ran wide, before another caution ushered in the second round of stops. Palou's pit crew delivered, helping him skip past Newgarden and Herta into the lead. While Newgarden dropped back on the restart, Herta was able to get back into the lead. He had the least fuel of all the front runners, so had to pit first and then save the most in the final stint. This left him defenseless against the cars behind and saw him drop back to finish the race fifth. Palou took his second consecutive win, ahead of Newgarden and O'Ward, who had both managed their fuel situation better than Herta. Palou now led the championship by 74 points over Newgarden.

At the Honda Indy 200, Herta bounced back from his demise to take another pole position, this time ahead of Rahal. Palou, who had started fourth, overtook Kirkwood for third and then overcut both leaders, while Rahal suffered a pitstop issue that dropped out of contention and allowed Dixon into third place. Palou then began gapping the field, before becoming stuck behind Foyt's Benjamin Pedersen, the last car on the lead lap, who defended heavily to not get lapped. This almost brought Herta back towards Palou's rear, before the latter finally got past Pedersen. During the second round of stops, Herta was then hit with a pit lane speeding penalty that dropped him down to eleventh place. This promoted Power onto the podium when O'Ward, who had started down in 25th and was on a different strategy, pitted for a third time. Palou held on to a comfortable gap and led Dixon home in a CGR 1–2 to win his third consecutive race - pad his championship lead to 110 points, while Dixon overtook Newgarden for second in the standings.

IndyCar's only abroad race around the streets of Toronto saw Lundgaard take pole position in a wet-dry qualifying. An eight-car pileup on the first lap did not disturb him as he led until his first stop, after which he got stuck behind traffic. He had to fight his way up the order, before the cars around him also started to pit. This put him back into the lead, ahead of McLaughlin, who was on a different strategy, and O'Ward. Then, two consecutive cautions jumbled up the order as many cars elected to take their second stop. McLaughlin led Dixon and VeeKay at the restart, while Lundgaard was sixth. A few overtakes and most of the lead group having to pit again then handed the lead back to Lundgaard, and he did not give it away again. Second place was Palou, who had started 15th, but drove a great race and benefitted hugely from the cautions. Herta came third, after not finding a way past Palou despite the latter driving with a damaged front wing for almost half the race. Palou increased his lead over Dixon to 117 points.

Power took a pair of pole positions at the Iowa double-header. The Homefront 250 began with a Penske 1-2-3 of Power, Newgarden and McLaughlin that kept in front throughout the first two stints until lap 83, when the trio began disputing the race lead. Newgarden overtook McLaughlin and spent twenty laps battling Power until he finally got past on lap 121. Then began the second round of stops, and Power began struggling for pace, culminating in him touching the wall and dropping to fourth. This promoted O'Ward to third, before a caution came out when Rahal crashed. Power's pace was back after the restart and he fought back past Ericsson into fourth, but could not get past O'Ward. McLaughlin in second managed to shrink the lead gap all the way down to two seconds during the final stint, but Newgarden prevailed in the end to take his second victory of the season. Championship leader Palou finished eighth, his lowest result of the season, and saw his standings lead shrink to 98 points ahead of newly second-placed Newgarden.

A day later, the One Step 250 started in similar fashion, with Power ahead of McLaughlin. Newgarden started seventh and wasted no time to get up the order: by lap 26 he was in third, and then he overtook both his teammates on lap 32 to take the lead. After the first round of stops, the familiar Penske trio was up in front, before Dixon took third. This top three then remained across the next two stints, when McLaughlin pitted under caution to take fresh tires. This saw him rocket up the order, while Newgarden had to defend from Power. Rosenqvist was able to jump Dixon at this time, before the final round of pit stops began. There, Power was held up and had to relinquish second to Rosenqvist. The Swede attacked Newgarden, but could not get past. A late caution set up a three-lap shootout where Rosenqvist was jumped by Power, causing him to slip down the order and gifting Palou third place. This meant Palou only lost 18 points to Newgarden, whose fifth straight oval win brought him 80 points behind Palou.

=== Closing rounds ===
McLaughlin took pole for the Music City Grand Prix and led O'Ward and Herta in the opening stages, before a sudden rear wing collapse for Malukas brought out the first caution. O'Ward ran into McLaughlin's back on the restart while Herta touched the wall and dropped down the order. Both Kirkwood and Grosjean overcut McLaughlin, while Palou had been the only leading car to pit under caution, promoting him to the race lead after the first round of stops. This meant that he had to stop earlier than the cars around him, and also gave him a hefty fuel saving goal to hit. Kirkwood was able to make the overcut work once again, together with McLauhglin. A late caution for Linus Lundqvist, making his debut at MSR as an injury substitute for Simon Pagenaud, and a subsequent red flag after the restart helped Palou to meet his fuel saving goals. He therefore avoided having to stop again and secured third, while Kirkwood took his second win. Palou's closest title rival Newgarden came home fourth, so the championship gap grew again, to 84 points.

Next up was the Gallagher Grand Prix, that began with Rahal on pole position and drama on the first lap: Andretti's Devlin DeFrancesco made a brilliant move from fifth to the lead at the start, before championship chasers Newgarden and Dixon crashed and spun respectively at turn seven. DeFrancesco soon tumbled down the order, leaving Rahal to lead from Rossi. A round of stops did not change the order of the leaders, but Lundgaard in third was fastest at this stage, taking second and beginning to put pressure on Rahal. While the lead battle brewed, Dixon had quietly worked his way up the order. Having pitted after his spin on lap one, his completely different strategy and an extra set of tires he hadn't used in qualifying were paying out. When Rahal pitted for the final time, he came out in second, five seconds behind Dixon. Rahal was gaining on him, but could not find a way by in the end, leaving him to take second ahead of O'Ward. Newgarden's crash saw him finish 25th, as he was overtaken by Dixon in the standings, now 101 points behind Palou.

The final oval race of the season was held at World Wide Technology Raceway. McLaughlin won qualifying, but Newgarden started on pole position. He led Herta, before Malukas got by into second and the first round of pit stops began. O'Ward was the fastest car on track during the second stint, climbing up to second, but not finding a way by Newgarden. Dixon had started 16th, but ran longest before pitting in the first two stints, so inherited the lead when the leaders pitted. He was then able to stop under caution when Sato retired, allowing him to keep his lead and aligning his strategy with the cars around him. O'Ward undercut Newgarden for second at the next stops, and when Newgarden tried to return the favor at the next stop, he hit the wall and broke his suspension. This left Dixon without any opposition to take another remarkable win ahead of O'Ward, while Malukas took his second career podium, both coming at WWTR. Dixon was now the only driver in contention to take the title from Palou, having shortened the lead to 74 points.

The penultimate round was the Grand Prix of Portland, where Rahal won pole position from McLaughlin and Herta. By the first caution on lap 7, Palou had made up two positions from fifth to third. When the leading duo pitted, they got caught in traffic, while Palou stayed out on his primary tires. He and Dixon behind him could push in clean air, and that resulted in the race lead once the pit stops had cycled through. Dixon appeared faster than Palou during that stage as Palou had to conserve his tires, but this time Palou pitted first to extend his lead to Dixon once again. A caution then brought Rosenqvist right behind Dixon, as he was able to stop before the pits closed and therefore jumped Dixon. Palou defended from Rosenqvist on the final restart and controlled the race to win and take his second championship. This was the first time the championship was clinched prior to the final round since Sébastien Bourdais won in 2007. Dixon's third place secured his second place in the standings, earning his team a 1–2 in the championship.

Rosenqvist took pole position in his final race for McLaren at Laguna Seca. Right at the start, a multi-car collision set the tone for the rest of the race. Palou picked up the lead, before another caution came out and held off Rosenqvist, until the Swede got spun around by Ericsson to trigger another yellow. What followed were multiple restarts that all only lasted for a few laps at most, with most of them being called off almost immediately when cars collided either at the final turn or into turn two. Many cars took turns to lead a few laps, before electing to pit or dropping back during one of the restarts. The eighth and final caution ended with 17 laps to go, and Dixon led from McLaughlin, Ilott and Palou. The latter immediately took third place, and the trio came home in that order. With the final race, Chevrolet secured the Manufacturers' Cup, while Armstrong took eighth place to win Rookie of the Year honors. Further down, Canapino held on to 14th to secure the final spot in the Leaders Circle.

Álex Palou's second championship was his most dominant yet, 78 points ahead of teammate Dixon, whose tally of 578 points was more than Palou got during his first championship year - despite the Indy 500 not awarding double points in 2023. While Dixon seemed to come alive in the final stretch of the season, winning three of the last four races, it was too late to keep Palou from winning the title. Too strong had his mid-season form been, winning three straight races and always bouncing back from bad luck. Crucial moments like his collision with VeeKay during a pit stop at the Indy 500, where he managed to salvage fourth place afterwards, further contributed to his dominant title. Last years' second placed driver Newgarden could not transfer his overwhelming oval pace to other circuit types, while the reigning champion Power was not able to win a single race and came seventh, a far cry from his 2022 form.

== Points standings ==
- Ties were broken by number of wins, followed by number of 2nds, 3rds, etc.; then by finishing position in the previous race; then by random draw.

Position	1st	2nd	3rd	4th	5th	6th	7th	8th	9th	10th	11th	12th	13th	14th	15th	16th	17th	18th	19th	20th	21st	22nd	23rd	24th	25th+
Points	50	40	35	32	30	28	26	24	22	20	19	18	17	16	15	14	13	12	11	10	9	8	7	6	5

=== Driver standings ===
- At all races except the Indy 500, the pole position qualifier earned 1 point (unless qualifying is not held). The twelve Indy 500 qualifiers who qualified for the fast 12 session received points based on the results of that session, descending from 12 points for first place.
- Drivers who led at least one race lap were awarded 1 point. The driver who led the most laps during a race scored an additional 2 points.
- Entrant-initiated engine change-outs before the engine reached their required distance run resulted in the loss of 10 points.

Pos	Driver	STP	TMS	LBH	BAR	IGP1	INDY	DET	ROA	MOH	TOR	IOW		NSC	IGP2	GTW	POR	LAG	Pts
1	(Spain) Álex Palou	8	3^{L}	5^{L}	5	1^{L}*	**4**^{1L}	**1**^{L}*	1^{L}	1^{L}*	2	8^{L}	3	3^{L}	7	7	1^{L}*	3^{L}*	656
2	(New Zealand) Scott Dixon	3^{L}	5^{L}	27	7	6^{L}	6^{6}	4	4	2^{L}	4^{L}	6	6^{L}	5	1^{L}	1^{L}*	3^{L}	1^{L}	578
3	(New Zealand) Scott McLaughlin	13^{L}*	6	10	1^{L}	16	14	7	8	5	6^{L}	2	5^{L}	**2**^{L}	8	**5**	9	2	488
4	(Mexico) Pato O'Ward	2^{L}	2^{L}	17	4	2^{L}	24^{5L}*	26^{L}	3	8	8	3	10	8	3	2^{L}	4	9^{L}	484
5	(United States) Josef Newgarden	17	1^{L}*	9^{L}	15^{L}	7	1^{L}	10^{L}	2	12	5	1^{L}*	1^{L}*	4	25	25^{L}	5	21	479
6	(Sweden) Marcus Ericsson	1^{L}	8	3	10	8^{L}	2^{10L}	9^{L}	6	27	11^{L}	4	9^{L}	7^{L}	10	10	7	15	438
7	(Australia) Will Power	7	16	6	3^{L}	12	23^{12L}	2^{L}	13^{L}	3^{L}	14	**5**^{L}	**2**^{L}	10^{L}	6	9^{L}	25	4	425
8	(Denmark) Christian Lundgaard	9	19	14	6	**4**^{L}	19	16	7	4	**1**^{L}*	20	13	9	4^{L}	17	11	6	390
9	(United States) Alexander Rossi	4	22	22	8	3^{L}	5^{7L}	5^{L}	10	10	16	10	15	19	5	4^{L}	20	7	375
10	(United States) Colton Herta	20	7^{L}	4	14	9	9^{L}	11	**5**^{L}*	**11**^{L}	3	19	7	21	13	6^{L}	13	23^{L}	356
11	(United States) Kyle Kirkwood	15	27	**1**^{L}*	12	14	28	6^{L}	9	17	15	7	11	1^{L}*	9	15	10	25	352
12	(Sweden) Felix Rosenqvist	19	**26**^{L}	7	9	5^{L}	27^{3L}	3	20	25	10	13	4^{L}	22	27	8	2^{L}	**19**^{L}	324
13	(France) Romain Grosjean	**18**^{L}	14^{L}	2	**2**^{L}*	11	30	24	25	13	22	11	12	6^{L}	18	12	27	11^{L}	296
14	(Netherlands) Rinus VeeKay	21	11	26	16	13	10^{2L}	18	12	15	13	17	18	14	11	11	6	18	277
15	(United States) Graham Rahal	6	24	12	17	10^{L}	22^{1}	25	11	7^{L}	9	28	20	15	**2**^{L}*	20	**12**^{L}	27	276
16	(United Kingdom) Callum Ilott	5	9	19	13	18	12^{L}	27	18	16	18	15	14	12	17	27	15	5	266
17	(United States) David Malukas	10^{L}	4	20	19	26	29	23	27	6	20	12	8	27	16	3	8^{L}	20	265
18	(Brazil) Hélio Castroneves	23	10	21	21	22	15^{L}	19	15	21	21	14	16	11	15	23	14	13	217
19	(United States) Santino Ferrucci	24	21	11	20	23	3^{4L}	21	16	24	17	26	22	18	23	13	16	17	214
20	(New Zealand) Marcus Armstrong RY	11		8	11	15		8	24^{L}	9	7			13	24		19	8	214
21	(Argentina) Agustín Canapino R	12	12	25^{L}	26	21	26	14	19	23	12	16	26	20	21	22	26	14	180
22	(Canada) Devlin DeFrancesco	25	23	16	23	17	13	12	23	14	23	22	21	26	19^{L}	19	17	22	177
23	(United States) Sting Ray Robb R	16	25^{L}	18	27	27	31	22	22	22	19	25	28	17	22	21	23	12	147
24	(United Kingdom) Jack Harvey	22	18	13	24	20	18	17	26	18	24	18	19	24	14				146
25	(United States) Conor Daly	14	20	23	25	19	8	15		20		21	17			16			134
26	(United States) Ryan Hunter-Reay						11^{L}		17	19	26	23	24	16	20	14	21	10	131
27	(Denmark) Benjamin Pedersen R	27	15	24	22	24	21^{11}	20	21	26	27	27	27	23	26	28	22	16	129
28	(France) Simon Pagenaud	26	17	15	18	25	25	13	14	Wth									88
29	(Japan) Takuma Sato		28				7^{8L}					9^{L}	25			26			70
30	(United States) Ed Carpenter		13				20					24	23			24			46
31	(Sweden) Linus Lundqvist R													25	12	18			35
32	(Brazil) Tony Kanaan						16^{9}												18
33	(Estonia) Jüri Vips R																18	24	18
34	(United Kingdom) Tom Blomqvist R										25						24	26	16
35	(United States) Marco Andretti						17												13
36	(United States) R. C. Enerson R						32												5
37	(United Kingdom) Katherine Legge						33												5
—	(United Kingdom) Stefan Wilson R						Wth^{1}												0
Pos	Driver	STP	TMS	LBH	BAR	IGP1	INDY	DET	ROA	MOH	TOR	IOW		NSC	IGP2	GTW	POR	LAG	Pts

Color	Result
Gold	Winner
Silver	2nd-place finish
Bronze	3rd-place finish
Green	Top 5 finish
Light Blue	Top 10 finish
Dark Blue	Other flagged position
Purple	Did not finish
Red	Did not qualify (DNQ)
Brown	Withdrew (Wth)
Black	Disqualified (DSQ)
White	Did Not Start (DNS)
White	Race abandoned (C)
Blank	Did not participate

**In-line notation**
**Bold**	Pole position (1 point; except Indy)
Italics	Ran fastest race lap
^{L}	Led race lap (1 point)
*	Led most race laps (2 points)
^{1–12}	Indy 500 "Fast Twelve" bonus points
^{c}	Qualifying canceled (no bonus point)
RY	Rookie of the Year
R	Rookie

1. Graham Rahal failed to qualify for the Indianapolis 500 but took over Stefan Wilson's seat after Wilson suffered an injury in the final practice session.

=== Entrant standings ===
- Each regular season entry that finished in the top 22 the previous season qualified for the Leaders Circle, the IndyCar program which, among other things, awarded each team in it around a $910,000 bonus for completing the races providing that car competed in the full season. The Leaders Circle payouts were reduced for the 2023 season.
- Only 3 entrants from a single team were eligible for Leaders' Circle payments. The sole exception to this is Andretti's team, whose 4th entry had been grandfathered in for eligibility. Thus, in reality the only team in the top 22 that was not eligible for Leaders' Circle payments was one of the Ganassi cars and the last entrant to be in the Leaders' Circle was the #30 Rahal Letterman Lanigan Racing entry.
- Based on the entrant, used for oval qualifications order, and starting grids when qualifying is cancelled.
- Only full-time entrants or part-time entrants that ran in more than 8 races shown.

Pos	Entrant	STP	TMS	LBH	BAR	IGP1	INDY	DET	ROA	MOH	TOR	IOW		NSC	IGP2	GTW	POR	LAG	Pts
1	#10 Chip Ganassi Racing	8	3^{L}	5^{L}	5	1^{L}*	**4**^{1L}	**1**^{L}*	1^{L}	1^{L}*	2	8^{L}	3	3^{L}	7	7	1^{L}*	3^{L}*	656
2	#9 Chip Ganassi Racing	3^{L}	5^{L}	27	7	6^{L}	6^{6}	4	4	2^{L}	4^{L}	6	6^{L}	5	1^{L}	1^{L}*	3^{L}	1^{L}	578
3	#3 Team Penske	13^{L}*	6	10	1^{L}	16	14	7	8	5	6^{L}	2	5^{L}	**2**^{L}	8	**5**	9	2	488
4	#5 Arrow McLaren	2^{L}	2^{L}	17	4	2^{L}	24^{5L}*	26^{L}	3	8	8	3	10	8	3	2^{L}	4	9^{L}	484
5	#2 Team Penske	17	1^{L}*	9^{L}	15^{L}	7	1^{L}	10^{L}	2	12	5	1^{L}*	1^{L}*	4	25	25^{L}	5	21	479
6	#8 Chip Ganassi Racing	1^{L}	8	3	10	8^{L}	2^{10L}	9^{L}	6	27	11^{L}	4	9^{L}	7^{L}	10	10	7	15	438
7	#12 Team Penske	7	16	6	3^{L}	12	23^{12L}	2^{L}	13^{L}	3^{L}	14	**5**^{L}	**2**^{L}	10^{L}	6	9^{L}	25	4	425
8	#45 Rahal Letterman Lanigan Racing	9	19	14	6	**4**^{L}	19	16	7	4	**1**^{L}*	20	13	9	4^{L}	17	11	6	390
9	#7 Arrow McLaren	4	22	22	8	3^{L}	5^{7L}	5^{L}	10	10	16	10	15	19	5	4^{L}	20	7	375
10	#26 Andretti Autosport with Curb-Agajanian	20	7^{L}	4	14	9	9^{L}	11	**5**^{L*}	**11**^{L}	3	19	7	21	13	6^{L}	13	23^{L}	356
11	#27 Andretti Autosport	15	27	**1**^{L}*	12	14	28	6^{L}	9	17	15	7	11	1^{L}*	9	15	10	25	352
12	#6 Arrow McLaren	19	**26**^{L}	7	9	5^{L}	27^{3L}	3	20	25	10	13	4^{L}	22	27	8	2^{L}	**19**^{L}	324
13	#28 Andretti Autosport	**18**^{L}	14^{L}	2	**2**^{L}*	11	30	24	25	13	22	11	12	6^{L}	18	12	27	11^{L}	296
14	#11 Chip Ganassi Racing	11	28	8	11	15	7^{8L}	8	24^{L}	9	7	9^{L}	25	13	24	26	19	8	284
15	#21 Ed Carpenter Racing	21	11	26	16	13	10^{2L}	18	12	15	13	17	18	14	11	11	6	18	277
16	#15 Rahal Letterman Lanigan Racing	6	24	12	17	10^{L}	DNQ	25	11	7^{L}	9	28	20	15	**2**^{L}*	20	**12**^{L}	27	268
17	#77 Juncos Hollinger Racing	5	9	19	13	18	12^{L}	27	18	16	18	15	14	12	17	27	15	5	266
18	#18 Dale Coyne Racing with HMD Motorsports	10^{L}	4	20	19	26	29	23	27	6	20	12	8	27	16	3	8^{L}	20	265
19	#06 Meyer Shank Racing	23	10	21	21	22	15^{L}	19	15	21	21	14	16	11	15	23	14	13	217
20	#14 A. J. Foyt Enterprises	24	21	11	20	23	3^{4L}	21	16	24	17	26	22	18	23	13	16	17	214
21	#20 Ed Carpenter Racing	14	20	23	25	19	8	15	17	19	26	23	24	16	20	14	21	10	199
22	#78 Juncos Hollinger Racing	12	12	25^{L}	26	21	26	14	19	23	12	16	26	20	21	22	26	14	180
23	#30 Rahal Letterman Lanigan Racing	22	18	13	24	20	18	17	26	18	24	18	19	24	14	16	18	24	178
24	#29 Andretti Steinbrenner Autosport	25	23	16	23	17	13	12	23	14	23	22	21	26	19^{L}	19	17	22	177
25	#60 Meyer Shank Racing	26	17	15	18	25	25	13	14	20	25	21	17	25	12	18	24	26	171
26	#51 Dale Coyne Racing with Rick Ware Racing	16	25^{L}	18	27	27	31	22	22	22	19	25	28	17	22	21	23	12	147
27	#55 A. J. Foyt Enterprises	27	15	24	22	24	21^{11}	20	21	26	27	27	27	23	26	28	22	16	129
Pos	Entrant	STP	TMS	LBH	BAR	IGP1	INDY	DET	ROA	MOH	TOR	IOW		NSC	IGP2	GTW	POR	LAG	Pts

=== Engine Manufacturer standings ===
Pos	Manufacturer	STP	TMS	LBH	BAR	IGP1	INDY	DET	ROA	MOH	TOR	IOW		NSC	IGP2	GTW	POR	LAG	Pts
1	(United States) Chevrolet	2	1	6	1	2	1	2	2	3	5	1	1	2	3	1	1	1	1437
1	(United States) Chevrolet	4	2	7	3	3	3	3	3	5	6	2	2	4	5	2	2	2	1437
1	(United States) Chevrolet	72	96^{PW}	54	90^{W}	75	176^{FW}	75	75	65	58	96^{PW}	96^{PW}	73^{P}	65	90	90	91^{P}	1437
2	(Japan) Honda	1	3	1	2	1	2	1	1	1	1	4	3	1	1	3	4	3	1425
2	(Japan) Honda	3	4	2	5	4	4	4	4	2	2	6	6	3	2	6	5	6	1425
2	(Japan) Honda	91^{PW}	67	96^{PW}	71^{P}	88^{PW}	146^{P}	88^{PW}	88^{PW}	96^{PW}	96^{PW}	60	63	90^{W}	96^{PW}	63	63^{P}	63	1425

Manufacturer standings results breakdown
Entrant	STP	TMS	LBH	BAR	IGP1	INDY	DET	ROA	MOH	TOR	IOW		NSC	IGP2	GTW	POR	LAG
Chevrolet
#2 Team Penske	17	1^{2}	9	15	7	1^{3,4}	10	2	12	5	1	1	4	Ineligible			
#3 Team Penske	13^{2}	6	10	1	16	13^{3,4}	7	8	5	7	2	5	**2**	8	Ineligible		
#5 Arrow McLaren	2	2	17	4	2^{2}	19^{3}	26	3	8	8	3	10	8	3	1^{4}	2	5
#6 Arrow McLaren	19	**25**	7	9	5^{2}	22^{3}	3	20	25	10	13	4	22	23^{4}	4	1	**11**
#7 Arrow McLaren	4	21	22	8	3^{2}	5^{3}	5	10	10	16	10	15	19	5^{4}	2	11	4
#12 Team Penske	7	15	6	3	12^{2}	18^{3}	2	13	3	14	**5**	**2**	10	6^{4}	5	14	1
#14 A. J. Foyt Enterprises	24	20	11	20	23^{2}	3^{3}	21	16	24	17	25	22	18	20	9^{4}	9	Inel.
#20 Ed Carpenter Racing	14	19^{2}	23	25	19	8^{3,4}	15	17	19	26	23	23	16	17	10	Ineligible	
#21 Ed Carpenter Racing	21	11	26	16	13^{2}	10^{3}	18	12	15	13	17	18	14	11^{4}	7	3	10
#55 A. J. Foyt Enterprises	27	14	24	22^{2}	24	17^{3}	20	21	26	27	26	26	23	22	17^{4}	12	9
#77 Juncos Hollinger Racing	5	9	19	13	18^{2}	11^{3}	27	18	16	18	15	14	12	14	16^{4}	8	2
#78 Juncos Hollinger Racing	12	12	25	26^{2}	21	21^{3}	14	19	23	12	16	25	20	18^{4}	Ineligible		
Race Finish	72	90	54	85	75	85	75	75	65	58	90	90	72	65	90	90	90
Indy Bonus	-	-	-	-	-	85	-	-	-	-	-	-	-	-	-	-	-
Pole Bonus	-	1	-	-	-	1	-	-	-	-	1	1	1	-	0	-	1
Win Bonus	-	5	-	5	-	5	-	-	-	-	5	5	-	-	-	-	-
Total points	72	96	54	90	75	176	75	75	65	58	96	96	73	65	90	90	91
Honda
#06 Meyer Shank Racing	23	10	21	21	22^{2,3}	14^{4}	19	15	21	21	14	16	11	Ineligible			
#8 Chip Ganassi Racing	1	8	3	10	8^{2}	2^{3}	9	6	27	11	4	9	7	10^{4}	6	4	8
#9 Chip Ganassi Racing	3	5	27	7^{2}	6	6^{3,4}	4	4	2	4	6	6	5	1	Ineligible		
#10 Chip Ganassi Racing	8	3	5	5^{2}	1	**4**^{3,4}	**1**	1	1	2	8	3	3	7	Ineligible		
#11 Chip Ganassi Racing	11	27	8	11	15^{2}	7^{3}	8	24	9^{4}	7	9	24	13	21	Ineligible		
#15 Rahal Letterman Lanigan Racing	6	23	12	17	10^{2}	DNQ	25	11	7^{3}	9	27	20	15	**2**	14^{4}	**6**	14
#18 Dale Coyne Racing with HMD Motorsports	10	4	20	19	26^{2}	24^{3}	23	27	6^{4}	20	12	8	27	Ineligible			
#26 Andretti Autosport with Curb-Agajanian	20	7	4	14	9^{2}	9^{3,4}	11	**5**	**11**	3	19	7	21	13	3	7	13
#27 Andretti Autosport	15	26	**1**	12	14^{2}	23^{3}	6	9	17	15	7	11	1	9	Ineligible		
#28 Andretti Autosport	**18**	13	2	**2**^{2}	11	25^{3}	24	25	13	22	11	12	6	15^{4}	8	15	6
#29 Andretti Steinbrenner Autosport	25	22	16	23	17^{2}	12^{3,4}	12	23	14	23	22	21	26	16	13	10	12
#30 Rahal Letterman Lanigan Racing	22	17	13	24	20^{2}	15^{3,4}	17	26	18	24	18	19	24	Ineligible			
#45 Rahal Letterman Lanigan Racing	9	18	14	6^{2}	**4**	16^{3}	16	7	4	**1**	20	13	9	4^{4}	11	5	3
#51 Dale Coyne Racing with Rick Ware Racing	16	24	18	27^{2}	27	26^{3}	22	22	22	19	24	27	17	19	15^{4}	13	7
#60 Meyer Shank Racing	26	16	15	18	25^{2}	20^{3}	13	14	20^{4}	25	21	17	25	12	12	Ineligible	
Race Finish	85	67	90	70	82	72	82	82	90	90	60	63	85	90	63	62	63
Indy Bonus	-	-	-	-	-	72	-	-	-	-	-	-	-	-	-	-	-
Pole Bonus	1	-	1	1	1	2	1	1	1	1	-	-	-	1	-	1	-
Win Bonus	5	-	5	-	5	-	5	5	5	5	-	-	5	5	0	0	0
Total points	91	67	96	71	88	146	88	88	96	96	60	63	90	96	63	63	63
Superscript indicates entrant engine count

== See also ==
- 2023 Indy NXT
- 2023 USF Pro 2000 Championship
- 2023 USF2000 Championship
- 2023 USF Juniors
