= Honda Racing Corporation USA =

Subsidiary of American Honda Motor Co

- Formerly: Honda Performance Development, Inc. (1993–2023)
- Type: Subsidiary
- Industry: Motorsport
- Founded: 1993; 33 years ago
- Headquarters: Santa Clarita, California, U.S.
- Area served: North America
- Key people: David Salters (President); Jon Ikeda (Senior VP)
- Products: Race cars, racing motors, and racing products
- Owner: Honda Motor Co., Ltd.
- Parent: American Honda Motor Co.
- Website: hondaracing-us.honda.com

Honda Racing Corporation USA (HRC US), formerly Honda Performance Development, Inc. (HPD), is a subsidiary of American Honda Motor Co. which was established in 1993 and is based in Santa Clarita, California. It is the technical operations center for Honda's American motorsports programs and is involved in the design and development of race engines and chassis for auto racing series such as the IndyCar Series, American Le Mans Series (ALMS), European Le Mans Series (ELMS), FIA World Endurance Championship (WEC) and IMSA SportsCar Championship.

The company's rename was announced in September 2023, as Honda Racing Corporation and then HPD looked to strengthen their capabilities in motorsport through joined collaboration.

== IndyCar racing ==
HPD debuted in the CART IndyCar World Series as a works engine manufacturer in 1994. During their first season in 1994, they scored a podium at Toronto, while in 1995 they scored their first victory at New Hampshire. In 1996, HPD won its first manufacturers' and drivers' championships after taking 11 wins from 16 races. HPD took six consecutive drivers championships' as it won the drivers' title again in 1997, 1998, 1999, 2000 and 2001, while it won the manufacturers' title again in 1998, 1999 and 2001.

In 2003, HPD moved to the IRL IndyCar Series. In 2004, HPD overwhelmingly dominated the IndyCar Series by winning 14 of 16 races, including the Indianapolis 500, and claiming the manufacturers' and drivers' championship titles. The 2005 season was similarly successful as the company took its second Indy 500 victory and won 12 races to win the manufacturers' and drivers' crowns. From 2006 to 2011, HPD was the sole engine manufacturer of the IndyCar Series, including the Indianapolis 500. During this period, the Indianapolis 500s were run without any engine failures for the first six times in Indy 500 history, while no race failures occurred in the entire 2008, 2010 and 2011 seasons.

Manufacturer competition returned to the series in 2012, and HPD has constructed turbocharged V6 engines for its effort. Since then, HPD has won the Indianapolis 500 in 2012, 2014, 2016, 2017, 2020, 2021, 2022, and 2025, the drivers' championship in 2013, 2018, 2020, 2021, 2023, 2024, and 2025, and the manufacturers' championship in 2018, 2019, 2020, 2021, and 2025.

== Sports car racing ==
In 2006, Honda through its Acura brand, announced its plans to develop a Le Mans Prototype program for the ALMS, competing in the LMP2 class for the initial year of competition in 2007. The new car, called Acura ARX-01a, was a homologated development of chassis from Courage with a new 3.4 liter V8, the maximum size allowed by the rules being developed by HPD. This was the first V8 ever branded as an Acura and the first racing Honda engine built entirely outside Japan. Elements of the Acura V8 dubbed the AL7R, share similar architecture with the Honda engine used in the Indy Racing League although none of the parts are interchangeable. In 2010 Honda dropped the Acura name in favor of HPD and the car is now known as the HPD ARX-01.

- ARX-01
- ARX-02
- ARX-03
- ARX-04b
- ARX-05
- ARX-06

In 2007, HPD supplied Vemac RD320R and Vemac RD408R for GT300 cars in Super GT Series with designation C32B.

For the 2012 racing season, HPD decided to forgo having a works team and instead focus on being a chassis and engine provider. 2012 also saw HPD return to the premier class of racing, LMP1, in the Le Mans and FIA World Endurance Championship series.

FIA World Endurance Championship

Class	Team	Chassis	Engine
LMP1	Strakka Racing	ARX-03a	HPD LM-V8
LMP1	JRM Racing	ARX-03a	HPD LM-V8
LMP2	Starworks Motorsport	ARX-03b	HPD HR28TT V6

American Le Mans Series

Class	Team	Chassis	Engine
LMP1	Muscle Milk Racing	ARX-03a	HPD LM-V8
LMP2	Level 5 Motorsports	ARX-03b	HPD HR28TT V6
LMP2	Black Swan Racing	Lola B11/80 coupe	HPD HR28TT V6

IMSA SportsCar Championship

Class	Team	Chassis	Engine
LMP2	Extreme Speed Motorsports	ARX-03b	HPD HR28TT V6
LMP2	Extreme Speed Motorsports	ARX-04b	HPD HR28TT V6
LMP2	Meyer Shank Racing	Ligier JS P2	HPD HR35TT V6
DPi	Meyer Shank Racing	Acura ARX-05	HPD AR35TT V6
GTP	Meyer Shank Racing/Wayne Taylor Racing	Acura ARX-06	Acura AR24e V6

For 2017, HPD left the Daytona Prototypes class of the IMSA SportsCar Championship, as the Acura NSX competed at the IMSA SportsCar Championship and Pirelli World Challenge with technical support from HPD.

For 2018, HPD returned to the Prototype class of the IMSA SportsCar Championship, as the ARX-05 competed at the IMSA SportsCar Championship with technical support from HPD.
