= List of IndyCar Series racetracks =

This is a list of racetracks which have hosted IndyCar Series racing.

Since 1996 and by the end of the 2026 season, IndyCar events will have been held at 50 different tracks – 24 ovals, 11 road courses, 14 street circuits, and 1 combined road course – spread across five countries: the United States, Canada, Australia, (Note: Non-points-paying race) Brazil, and Japan.

== Racetracks ==
- The "Map" column shows a diagram of the racetrack configuration.
- Current and former racetracks, along with "Races" column are accurate as of the beginning of the 2026 season.

Icon	Legend	Note
O	Oval/Speedway	An oval-shaped permanent racing facility. Tracks of one mile or less are short tracks; tracks of two miles or more are superspeedways.
R	Road course	A permanent racetrack that features both left and right turns. A combined road course is a racing facility that features a road course that incorporates part of an oval track.
S	Street circuit	A temporary circuit composed of temporarily closed-off public roads or airport runways.

=== Current ===
Racetrack	Type	Current Length	Direction	Location	Map	Race name	Seasons	Races
Arlington Street Circuit	S	2.730 mi (4.394 km)	Clockwise	Arlington, Texas		Grand Prix of Arlington	2026	1
Barber Motorsports Park	R	2.380 mi (3.830 km)	Clockwise	Birmingham, Alabama		Grand Prix of Alabama: Indy Grand Prix of Alabama presented by Legacy Credit Union (2010), Honda Indy Grand Prix of Alabama (2011–2019, 2021–2022), Children's of Alabama Indy Grand Prix (2023–present)	2010–2019, 2021–present	15
Detroit Street Circuit	S	1.645 mi (2.647 km)	Counter-clockwise	Detroit, Michigan		Detroit Grand Prix: Chevrolet Detroit Grand Prix presented by Lear (2023–present)	2023–present	3
Indianapolis Motor Speedway	O	2.500 mi (4.023 km)	Counter-clockwise	Speedway, Indiana		Indianapolis 500: Indianapolis 500 (1996–2015), Indianapolis 500 presented by PennGrade Motor Oil (2016–2018), Indianapolis 500 presented by Gainbridge (2019–present)	1996–present	30
Indianapolis Motor Speedway (road course)	R	2.439 mi (3.925 km)	Clockwise	Speedway, Indiana		Grand Prix of Indianapolis: Grand Prix of Indianapolis (2014), Angie's List Grand Prix of Indianapolis (2015–2016), INDYCAR Grand Prix (2017–2019), GMR Grand Prix (2020–2023), INDYCAR Harvest GP (2020), Big Machine Spiked Coolers Grand Prix (2021), Gallagher Grand Prix (2022–2023), Sonsio Grand Prix (2024–present)	2014–present	17 (3 in 2020, 2 in 2021–2023)
Long Beach Street Circuit	S	1.968 mi (3.167 km)	Clockwise	Long Beach, California		Grand Prix of Long Beach: Toyota Grand Prix of Long Beach (2008–2018), Acura Grand Prix of Long Beach (2019–present)	2008–2019, 2021–present	17
Markham Street Circuit	S	2.19 mi (3.52 km)	Clockwise	Markham, Ontario, Canada		Ontario Honda Dealers Indy at Markham	2026	1
Mid-Ohio Sports Car Course	R	2.258 mi (3.634 km)	Clockwise	Lexington, Ohio		Indy 200 at Mid-Ohio: Honda 200 (2007), Honda Indy 200 (2008–present)	2007–present	20 (2 in 2020)
Milwaukee Mile	O	1.015 mi (1.633 km)	Counter-clockwise	West Allis, Wisconsin		Milwaukee Grand Prix: Menards AJ Foyt Indy 225 (2004), ABC Supply Company AJ Foyt Indy 225 (2005–2009), Milwaukee 225 (2011), Milwaukee IndyFest presented by XYQ (2012), Milwaukee IndyFest (2013), ABC Supply Wisconsin 250 (2014–2015), Hy-Vee Milwaukee Mile 250 (2024), Snap-on Milwaukee Mile 250 (2025)	2004–2009, 2011–2015, 2024–2026	16 (2 in 2024 and 2026)
Nashville Superspeedway	O	1.333 mi (2.145 km)	Counter-clockwise	Lebanon, Tennessee		Music City Grand Prix: Harrah's Indy 200 (2001), Firestone Indy 200 (2002–2008), Big Machine Music City Grand Prix (2024), Borchetta Bourbon Music City Grand Prix (2025–2026)	2001–2008, 2024–2026	10
Phoenix Raceway	O	1.022 mi (1.645 km)	Counter-clockwise	Avondale, Arizona		Phoenix Grand Prix: Dura-Lube 200 (1996, 1998), Phoenix 200 (1996/97), MCI WorldCom 200 (1999), MCI WorldCom Indy 200 (2000), Pennzoil Copper World Indy 200 (2001), Bombardier/ATV Indy 200 (2002), Purex Dial Indy 200 (2003), Copper World Indy 200 (2004), XM Satellite Radio Indy 200 (2005), Desert Diamond West Valley Phoenix Grand Prix (2016–2017), Desert Diamond West Valley Casino Phoenix Grand Prix (2018), Phoenix Grand Prix (2026)	1996–2005, 2016–2018, 2026	13
Portland International Raceway	R	1.967 mi (3.166 km)	Clockwise	Portland, Oregon		Grand Prix of Portland (2018–2019, 2021–2022), BitNile.com Grand Prix of Portland (2023–present)	2018–2019, 2021–present	7
Road America	R	4.048 mi (6.515 km)	Clockwise	Elkhart Lake, Wisconsin		Grand Prix at Road America: KOHLER Grand Prix (2016–2018), Rev Group Grand Prix at Road America (2019–2021), Sonsio Grand Prix at Road America (2022–2023), XPEL Grand Prix at Road America (2024–present)	2016–present	11 (2 in 2020)
St. Petersburg Street Circuit	S	1.800 mi (2.897 km)	Clockwise	St. Petersburg, Florida		Grand Prix of St. Petersburg: Honda Grand Prix of St. Petersburg (2005–2013), Firestone Grand Prix of St. Petersburg (2014–present)	2005–present	21
Washington Street Circuit	S	1.700 mi (2.736 km)	Counter-clockwise	Washington, D.C.		Freedom 250 Grand Prix	2026	0
WeatherTech Raceway Laguna Seca	R	2.238 mi (3.602 km)	Counter-clockwise	Monterey, California		Grand Prix of Monterey: Firestone Grand Prix of Monterey (2019, 2021–2024), Grand Prix of Monterey (2025)	2019, 2021–2026	6
World Wide Technology Raceway	O	1.250 mi (2.012 km)	Counter-clockwise	Madison, Illinois		St. Louis Grand Prix: Gateway Indy 250 (2001–2002), Emerson Indy 250 (2003), Bommarito Automotive Group 500 (2017–present)	2001–2003, 2017–2026	13 (2 in 2020)

=== Future ===
Racetrack	Type	Current Length	Direction	Location	Map	Race name	Seasons	Races
Circuit de Barcelona-Catalunya	R	2.894 mi (4.657 km)	Clockwise	Montmeló, Barcelona		IndyCar Grand Prix of Barcelona: IndyCar Grand Prix of Barcelona (2027)	2027	0

=== Former ===
Racetrack	Type	Current Length	Direction	Location	Map	Race name	Seasons	Races
Atlanta Motor Speedway	O	1.540 mi (2.478 km)	Counter-clockwise	Hampton, Georgia		Atlanta Grand Prix: Atlanta 500 Classic (1998), Kobalt Mechanics Tools 500 (1999), Midas 500 Classic (2000), zMax 500 (2001)	1998–2001	4
Auto Club Speedway	O	2.000 mi (3.219 km)	Counter-clockwise	Fontana, California		Fontana Grand Prix: Yamaha Indy 400 (2002), Toyota Indy 400 (2003–2005), MAVTV 500 INDYCAR World Championships (2012–2014), MAVTV 500 (2015)	2002–2005, 2012–2015	8
Baltimore Street Circuit	S	2.040 mi (3.283 km)	Clockwise	Baltimore, Maryland		Grand Prix of Baltimore: Baltimore Grand Prix (2011), Grand Prix of Baltimore presented by SRT (2012–2013)	2011–2013	3
Charlotte Motor Speedway	O	1.500 mi (2.414 km)	Counter-clockwise	Concord, North Carolina		Charlotte Grand Prix: VisionAire 500 (1996/97–1999); (1999) (Note: Abandoned after a fatal crash)	1997–1999	3
Chicagoland Speedway	O	1.520 mi (2.446 km)	Counter-clockwise	Joliet, Illinois		Chicago Grand Prix: Delphi Indy 300 (2001–2004), Peak Antifreeze Indy 300 (2005–2007), Peak Antifreeze & Motor Oil Indy 300 (2008–2010)	2001–2010	10
Circuit of the Americas	R	3.427 mi (5.515 km)	Counter-clockwise	Austin, Texas		IndyCar Classic	2019	1
Detroit Belle Isle Street Circuit	S	2.350 mi (3.782 km)	Clockwise	Detroit, Michigan	(2007–2008, 2012) (2013–2019, 2021–2022)	Detroit Grand Prix: Detroit Indy Grand Prix presented by Firestone (2007–2008), Chevrolet Detroit Belle Isle Grand Prix (2012), Chevrolet Indy Dual in Detroit (2013–2014), Chevrolet Dual in Detroit (2015–2016), Chevrolet Detroit Grand Prix (2017–2019, 2021–2022); (2013–2019; 2021) (Note: Two full-points-paying races held on one weekend, counted as separate events)	2007–2008, 2012–2019, 2021–2022	20 (2 in 2013–2019 and 2021)
Dover Downs International Speedway	O	1.000 mi (1.609 km)	Counter-clockwise	Dover, Delaware		Dover Grand Prix: Pep Boys 400K (1998), MBNA Mid-Atlantic 200 (1999)	1998–1999	2
Edmonton Street Circuit	S	2.224 mi (3.579 km)	Counter-clockwise	Edmonton, Alberta, Canada		Edmonton Grand Prix: Rexall Edmonton Indy (2008–2009), Honda Indy Edmonton (2010), Edmonton Indy (2011–2012) (Note: Run on a different course layout than the one pictured)	2008–2012	5
Homestead–Miami Speedway	O	1.485 mi (2.390 km)	Counter-clockwise	Homestead, Florida		Grand Prix of Miami: Infiniti Grand Prix of Miami (2001), 20th Anniversary Grand Prix of Miami (2002), Toyota Indy 300 (2003–2006), XM Satellite Radio Indy 300 (2007), GAINSCO Auto Insurance Indy 300 (2008), Firestone Indy 300 (2009), Cafés do Brasil Indy 300 (2010)	2001–2010	10
Houston Speedway at NRG Park	S	1.634 mi (2.630 km)	Counter-clockwise	Houston, Texas		Grand Prix of Houston: Shell and Pennzoil Grand Prix of Houston (2013–2014)	2013–2014	4 (2 in 2013 and 2014)
Iowa Speedway	O	0.894 mi (1.439 km)	Counter-clockwise	Newton, Iowa		Iowa Grand Prix: Iowa Corn Indy 250 (2007–2013), Iowa Corn Indy 300 (2014), Iowa Corn 300 (2015–2019), Iowa Indycar 205s (2020), Hy-VeeDeals.com 250 (2022), Hy-Vee Salute to Farmers 300 (2022), Hy-Vee Homefront 250 (2023–2024), Hy-Vee One Step 250 (2023–2024), Synk 275 Powered by Sukup (2025), Farm to Finish 275 Powered by Sukup (2025)	2007–2020, 2022–2025	23 (2 in 2020 and 2022–2025)
Kansas Speedway	O	1.520 mi (2.446 km)	Counter-clockwise	Kansas City, Kansas		Kansas Grand Prix: Ameristar Casino Indy 200 (2001–2002), Kansas Indy 300 (2003), Argent Mortgage Indy 300 (2004–2005), Kansas Lottery Indy 300 (2006–2007), RoadRunner Turbo Indy 300 (2008–2010)	2001–2010	10
Kentucky Speedway	O	1.480 mi (2.382 km)	Counter-clockwise	Sparta, Kentucky		Kentucky Grand Prix: Belterra Resort Indy 300 (2000–2001), Belterra Casino Indy 300 (2002–2004), AMBER Alert Portal Indy 300 (2005), Meijer Indy 300 (2006–2009), Kentucky Indy 300 (2010–2011)	2000–2011	12
Las Vegas Motor Speedway	O	1.544 mi (2.485 km)	Counter-clockwise	Sunrise Manor, Nevada		Las Vegas Grand Prix: Las Vegas 500K (1996/97–1998), Vegas.com 500 (1999), Vegas Indy 300 (2000), IZOD INDYCAR World Championships (2011)	1996–2000, 2011	6
Michigan International Speedway	O	2.000 mi (3.219 km)	Counter-clockwise	Brooklyn, Michigan		Michigan Grand Prix: Michigan Indy 400 (2002, 2004), Firestone Indy 400 (2003, 2005–2007)	2002–2007	6
Nashville Street Circuit	S	2.170 mi (3.492 km)	Counter-clockwise	Nashville, Tennessee		Music City Grand Prix: Big Machine Music City Grand Prix (2021–2023)	2021–2023	3
Nazareth Speedway	O	0.935 mi (1.505 km)	Counter-clockwise	Nazareth, Pennsylvania		Nazareth Grand Prix: Firestone Indy 225 (2002–2004)	2002–2004	3
New Hampshire Motor Speedway	O	1.025 mi (1.650 km)	Counter-clockwise	Loudon, New Hampshire		New Hampshire Grand Prix: True Value 200 (1996/97), Pennzoil 200 (1996/97), New England 200 (1998), MoveThatBlock.com Indy 225 (2011)	1996–1998, 2011	4
NOLA Motorsports Park	R	2.740 mi (4.410 km)	Clockwise	Avondale, Louisiana		Indy Grand Prix of Louisiana	2015	1
Pikes Peak International Raceway	O	1.000 mi (1.609 km)	Counter-clockwise	Fountain, Colorado		Pikes Peak Grand Prix: Samsonite 200 (1996/97), Radisson 200 (1998–1999), Colorado Indy 200 (1999), Radisson Indy 200 (2000–2001), Radisson Indy 225 (2002), Honda Indy 225 (2003–2005)	1997–2005	10 (2 in 1999)
Pocono Raceway	O	2.500 mi (4.023 km)	Counter-clockwise	Long Pond, Pennsylvania		Pocono Grand Prix: Pocono INDYCAR 400 Fueled by Sunoco (2013), Pocono INDYCAR 500 Fueled by Sunoco (2014), ABC Supply 500 (2015–2019)	2013–2019	7
Richmond International Speedway	O	0.750 mi (1.207 km)	Counter-clockwise	Richmond, Virginia		Richmond Grand Prix: SunTrust Indy Challenge (2001–2009)	2001–2009	9
São Paulo Street Circuit	S	2.536 mi (4.081 km)	Clockwise	São Paulo, Brazil		São Paulo Grand Prix: São Paulo Indy 300 (2010), Itaipava São Paulo Indy 300 (2011–2013)	2010–2013	4
Sonoma Raceway	R	2.385 mi (3.838 km)	Clockwise	Sonoma, California		Grand Prix of Sonoma: Argent Mortgage Indy Grand Prix (2005), Indy Grand Prix of Sonoma (2006, 2009–2011), Motorola Indy 300 (2007), Peak Antifreeze & Motor Oil Indy Grand Prix of Sonoma County (2008), GoPro Indy Grand Prix of Sonoma (2012), GoPro Grand Prix of Sonoma (2013–2017), INDYCAR Grand Prix of Sonoma (2018); (2008–2018)	2005–2018	14
Surfers Paradise	S	2.795 mi (4.498 km)	Counter-clockwise	Surfers Paradise, Queensland, Australia		Surfers Paradise Grand Prix: Nikon Indy 300 (2008)	2008	1
Texas Motor Speedway	O	1.455 mi (2.342 km)	Counter-clockwise	Fort Worth, Texas		Texas Grand Prix: True Value 500 (1996/97–1998), Lone Star 500 (1998), Longhorn 500 (1999), Mall.com 500 (1999), Casino Magic 500 (2000–2001), Excite 500 (2000), Chevy 500 (2001–2004), Boomtown 500 (2002), Bombardier 500 (2003–2004), Bombardier Learjet 500 (2005–2006), Bombardier Learjet 550 (2007–2009), Firestone 550K (2010, 2012–2013), Firestone Twin 275s (2011), (Note: Two half-points-paying races held on one day, counted as one event) Firestone 600 (2014–2016), Rainguard Water Sealers 600 (2017), DXC Technology 600 (2018–2019), Genesys 600 (2020, Genesys 300 (2021), XPEL 375 (2021–2022), PPG 375 (2023)	1997–2023	35 (2 in 1998–2004 and 2021)
Thermal Club	R	3.067 mi (4.936 km)	Counter-clockwise	Thermal, California		The Thermal Club IndyCar Grand Prix	2024, 2025	2
Toronto Street Circuit	S	1.750 mi (2.816 km)	Clockwise	Toronto, Ontario, Canada		Toronto Grand Prix: Honda Indy Toronto (2009–2019, 2022–2023), Ontario Honda Dealers Indy Toronto (2024–present);(2013–2014)	2009–2019, 2022–2025	17 (2 in 2013–2014)
Twin Ring Motegi (oval)	O	1.549 mi (2.493 km)	Counter-clockwise	Motegi, Japan		Indy Japan 300	2003–2010	8
Twin Ring Motegi (road course)	R	2.983 mi (4.801 km)	Clockwise	Motegi, Japan		Indy Japan 300: The Final	2011	1
Walt Disney World Speedway	O	1.000 mi (1.609 km)	Counter-clockwise	Bay Lake, Florida		Orlando Grand Prix: Indy 200 presented by Aurora (1996–1998), TransWorld Diversified Services Indy 200 (1999), Delphi Indy 200 (2000)	1996–2000	5
Watkins Glen International	R	3.370 mi (5.423 km)	Clockwise	Watkins Glen, New York		Watkins Glen Grand Prix: Watkins Glen Indy Grand Prix presented by Argent Mortgage (2005), Watkins Glen Indy Grand Prix presented by Tissot (2006), Camping World Watkins Glen Grand Prix (2007), Camping World Indy Grand Prix at The Glen (2008), Camping World Grand Prix at The Glen (2009–2010), INDYCAR Grand Prix at The Glen presented by Hitachi (2016), INDYCAR Grand Prix at The Glen (2017)	2005–2010, 2016–2017	8

== Timeline ==
1996	1996–97	1998	1999	2000	2001	2002	2003	2004	2005	2006	2007	2008	2009	2010	2011	2012	2013	2014	2015	2016	2017	2018	2019	2020	2021	2022	2023	2024	2025	2026
Ovals
		Atlanta																												
						Auto Club										Auto Club														
	Charlotte																													
					Chicagoland																									
		Dover																												
					Gateway																Gateway									
					Homestead–Miami																									
Indianapolis (Oval)
											Iowa															Iowa				
					Kansas																									
				Kentucky																										
	Las Vegas														L. Vegas															
						Michigan																								
								Milwaukee							Milwaukee													Milwaukee		
							Motegi (Oval)																							
					Nashville (Oval)																							Nashville (Oval)		
						Nazareth																								
	New Hampshire														NH															
Phoenix																				Phoenix										Phoenix
	Pikes Peak																													
																	Pocono													
					Richmond																									
	Texas																													
Walt Disney World																														
Road Courses
														Barber											Barber					
											Mid-Ohio																			
																			NOLA											
																						Portland			Portland					
																				Road America										
									Sonoma																					
															Motegi (RC)															
									Watkins Glen											Watk. Glen										
																							COTA							
																							L. Seca		Laguna Seca					
																												Thermal		
Street Circuits
																														Arlington
															Baltimore															
																											Detroit			
											Detroit Belle Isle					Detroit Belle Isle									Detroit Belle Isle					
												Edmonton																		
																	Houston													
												Long Beach													Long Beach					
																														Markham
																									Nashville (Street)					
									St. Petersburg																					
														São Paulo																
												Surfers Paradise																		
													Toronto													Toronto				
																														Washington, D.C.
Combined Road Course
																		Indianapolis (Road Course)												

== See also ==
- List of motor racing venues by capacity
- List of Indycar races
- List of Champ Car circuits
