= 2026 Good Ranchers 250 =

Motor race held in Avondale, Arizona

(United States) 2026 Good Ranchers 250
Race details
2nd round of the 2026 IndyCar season
← Previous race	Next race →
- Layout of Phoenix Raceway
- Date: March 7, 2026
- Official name: Good Ranchers 250
- Location: Phoenix Raceway, Avondale, Arizona
- Course: Permanent racing facility 1.000 mi / 1.609 km
- Distance: 250 laps 250.000 mi / 402.336 km
- Weather: Clear 26 °C (79 °F)

Pole position
- Driver: (United States) David Malukas (Team Penske)
- Time: 41.0530

Fastest lap
- Driver: (Australia) Will Power (Andretti Global)
- Time: 21.8686 (on lap 192 of 250)

Podium
- First: (United States) Josef Newgarden (Team Penske)
- Second: (United States) Kyle Kirkwood (Andretti Global)
- Third: (United States) David Malukas (Team Penske)

Chronology
Previous	Next
2018	2027

The 2026 Good Ranchers 250 was an NTT IndyCar Series open-wheel race that was held on March 7, 2026, at Phoenix Raceway in Avondale, Arizona. It was the second round of the 2026 NTT IndyCar Series season and the first race at the track since 2018. The 250-lap event was won by Josef Newgarden of Team Penske, with Andretti Global driver Kyle Kirkwood finishing second and Newgarden's teammate David Malukas in third.

Malukas drove the fastest lap of qualifying and earned his first career pole position. He led the first 72 laps before a round of green-flag pit stops concluded with Pato O'Ward assuming the lead. O'Ward only led ten laps before Christian Rasmussen, who was handed a penalty early in the race, overtook him on the 108th lap. Rasmussen then became a strong contender to win the race, as he consistently managed to maneuver around other drivers and reclaim the lead. However, his performance was heavily tempered when Will Power pushed him into the wall while attempting to block him, and he was eventually forced to relinquish the lead to Kirkwood on lap 242. Newgarden, racing with fresh tires, passed Kirkwood two laps later and secured his first win of the season and the 33rd of his career.

The race had four cautions and 18 lead changes between nine drivers. With 16 races left in the season, Álex Palou, the points leader entering the event, crashed on lap 21 and fell to fifth in the standings, while Newgarden assumed the lead.

== Background ==
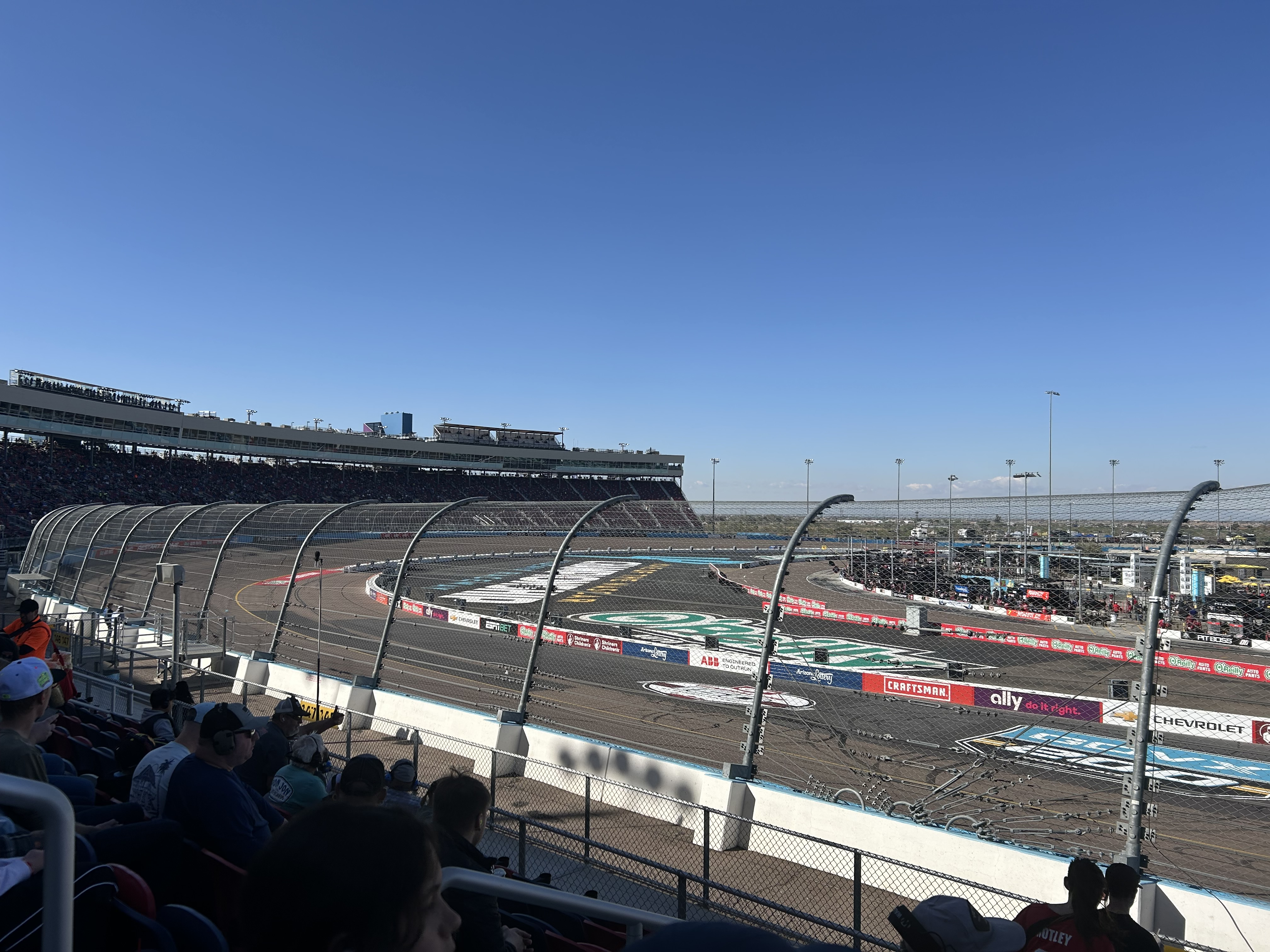
Phoenix Raceway (pictured in 2025), the track where the race was held.

Phoenix Raceway, a 1 mi (1.6 km) low-banked tri-oval race track in Avondale, Arizona, was once a staple on the American open-wheel car racing calendar, having hosted 64 races since 1964. However, track officials decided not to renew their contract with the IndyCar Series following the 2018 event, citing low attendance. In August 2025, motorsports magazine Racer reported that the series was planning a return to the track for the 2026 season. A month later, IndyCar announced their 2026 schedule and revealed their race in Phoenix was to be held on March 7 in conjunction with the NASCAR Cup Series and O'Reilly Auto Parts Series races. The race's distance of 250 laps and 250 miles (400 km) was announced in December, along with its title sponsor, American meat company Good Ranchers.

Of the 25 drivers entered for the race, only five of them had previously participated in an IndyCar Series race at Phoenix: Scott Dixon (2016 winner), Josef Newgarden (2018 winner), Will Power, Graham Rahal, and Alexander Rossi. To help drivers become acquainted with driving at Phoenix Raceway, an open testing session—titled the Unser IndyCar Open Test, in honor of the Unser family—was conducted by IndyCar at the circuit on February 17–18. David Malukas posted the fastest speed of the session on February 17 at 172.605 mph (277.781 km/h) within its final hour, with Team Penske teammate Newgarden in second. Rookie driver Caio Collet was involved in the lone session of the day, when his car slid into the turn-four SAFER barrier. Rossi was quickest in the morning and afternoon sessions on February 18, with speeds at 174.444 mph (280.740 km/h) and 174.542 mph (280.898 km/h), respectively. Forty-nine minutes into the afternoon session, Marcus Ericsson made contact with the front stretch wall.

Heading into the race, the second of 18 and the first on an oval track in the 2026 season, Álex Palou led the Drivers' Championship with 53 points, 11 more than second-placed Scott McLaughlin and 17 ahead of Christian Lundgaard in third. Kyle Kirkwood's 32 points placed him fourth, and Pato O'Ward stood fifth on 30 points. Palou, the winner of the preceding Firestone Grand Prix of St. Petersburg, was set to make his 100th career start; he remained modest about his approach for the race, stating: "I tend not to have much expectations. I’m pushing. I’m giving everything I have. I like to be in the car." Christian Rasmussen highly anticipated the event because of his prowess on ovals in the 2025 season and the test in February, which he felt "went really well for ECR." Former Formula One racer Mick Schumacher hoped to redeem himself following a first-lap crash at St. Petersburg.

== Practice and qualifying ==
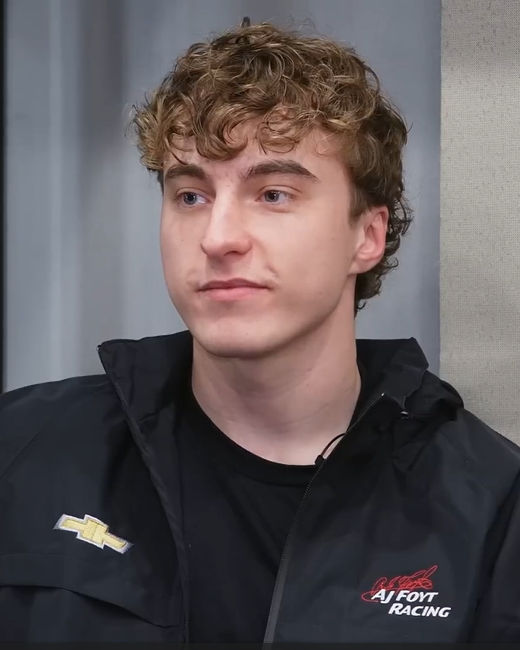
David Malukas (pictured in 2025) earned his first career pole position.

Two practice sessions preceded the race on Saturday; both were held on Friday, with the first lasting 60 minutes and the second 90 minutes. The first session on Friday morning was led by Malukas with a time of 20.5005 seconds, with O'Ward in second, Newgarden in third, Rasmussen in fourth, and Power in fifth. Felix Rosenqvist caused the only stoppage of the session twenty minutes in when his car spun backwards and slammed the wall exiting turn two, heavily damaging the left side of his car.

During qualifying, which was held three hours and five minutes after the first practice session concluded, each driver was required to complete two laps, and the cumulative time of the laps would determine their starting positions. The qualifying order was set by entrant points standings, with the lowest entry in the standings going on-track first and the highest going last. Malukas won the first pole position of his career with a time of 41.0530 seconds, almost two tenths of a second quicker than Newgarden, who qualified alongside him on the grid's front row. Rahal and Schumacher, both driving for Rahal Letterman Lanigan Racing, took the next two positions, marking the first time that two of the team's drivers qualified within the top-five in an oval race since the 2005 Peak Antifreeze Indy 300. The remaining spots in the top ten were occupied by Scott McLaughlin, Rossi, O'Ward, Rinus VeeKay, Nolan Siegel, and Palou, while the rest of the grid lined up as: Kirkwood, Sting Ray Robb, Marcus Armstrong, Ericsson, Dixon, Louis Foster, Lundgaard, Rasmussen, Kyffin Simpson, Romain Grosjean, Santino Ferrucci, Dennis Hauger, Collet, Rosenqvist, and Power. The latter two drivers were forced to take the last two positions because Rosenqvist's team was unable to complete repairs to his car in time, while Power crashed into the turn-two wall on his second timed lap. Power later stated that his knee hit the dashboard of his car upon impact.

The second practice session on Friday afternoon began with the 25 drivers being split into two groups and allotted 15 minutes of track time per group before a 50-minute session was conducted for all drivers. Newgarden's lap time of 21.4699 seconds topped the session; second-place Armstrong was six-hundredths of a second slower, while O'Ward, Palou, and Malukas rounded out the top five. The session went without incident, though Grosjean suffered electrical issues which hampered his performance.

=== Qualifying classification ===
Key	Meaning
R	Rookie
W	Past winner

Final qualifying results
Pos.	No.	Driver	Team	Engine	Time	Speed	Grid
1	12	(United States) David Malukas	Team Penske	Chevrolet	41.0530	175.383	1
2	2	(United States) Josef Newgarden W	Team Penske	Chevrolet	41.2493	174.548	2
3	15	(United States) Graham Rahal	Rahal Letterman Lanigan Racing	Honda	41.3810	173.993	3
4	47	(Germany) Mick Schumacher R	Rahal Letterman Lanigan Racing	Honda	41.4587	173.667	4
5	3	(New Zealand) Scott McLaughlin	Team Penske	Chevrolet	41.5109	173.448	5
6	20	(United States) Alexander Rossi	ECR	Chevrolet	41.5252	173.389	6
7	5	(Mexico) Pato O'Ward	Arrow McLaren	Chevrolet	41.5359	173.344	7
8	76	(Netherlands) Rinus VeeKay	Juncos Hollinger Racing	Chevrolet	41.5589	173.248	8
9	6	(United States) Nolan Siegel	Arrow McLaren	Chevrolet	41.6196	172.995	9
10	10	(Spain) Álex Palou	Chip Ganassi Racing	Honda	41.6234	172.980	10
11	27	(United States) Kyle Kirkwood	Andretti Global	Honda	41.6479	172.878	11
12	77	(United States) Sting Ray Robb	Juncos Hollinger Racing	Chevrolet	41.7305	172.536	12
13	66	(New Zealand) Marcus Armstrong	Meyer Shank Racing	Honda	41.7551	172.434	13
14	28	(Sweden) Marcus Ericsson	Andretti Global	Honda	41.7721	172.364	14
15	9	(New Zealand) Scott Dixon W	Chip Ganassi Racing	Honda	41.8425	172.074	15
16	45	(United Kingdom) Louis Foster	Rahal Letterman Lanigan Racing	Honda	41.9025	171.827	16
17	7	(Denmark) Christian Lundgaard	Arrow McLaren	Chevrolet	41.9664	171.566	17
18	21	(Denmark) Christian Rasmussen	ECR	Chevrolet	41.9728	171.540	18
19	8	(Cayman Islands) Kyffin Simpson	Chip Ganassi Racing	Honda	41.9974	171.439	19
20	18	(France) Romain Grosjean	Dale Coyne Racing	Honda	42.1512	171.439	20
21	14	(United States) Santino Ferrucci	A. J. Foyt Racing	Chevrolet	42.2096	170.814	21
22	19	(Norway) Dennis Hauger R	Dale Coyne Racing	Honda	42.3983	170.577	22
23	4	(Brazil) Caio Collet R	A. J. Foyt Racing	Chevrolet	42.9474	169.818	23
24	60	(Sweden) Felix Rosenqvist	Meyer Shank Racing	Honda	—	—	24
25	26	(Australia) Will Power	Andretti Global	Honda	20.6734	174.137	25

== Race ==
Live television coverage of the race in the United States began at 1:00 p.m. local time (UTC−07:00) and was aired on Fox. Play-by-play commentary was provided by Will Buxton, with analysis from former IndyCar Series drivers Townsend Bell and James Hinchcliffe and NASCAR Cup Series driver Joey Logano. As other cars drove off pit road to commence their warm-up laps, Grosjean's car was pushed to its pit box with a clutch issue, forcing him to retire without completing any laps. Malukas maintained his pole position advantage at the start, while Palou made his way to fourth place and Schumacher dropped to 11th by the fourth lap. Malukas held a lead of almost two seconds over Newgarden when on the tenth lap, Hauger, who had improved to 16th, spun backwards on the back stretch and barely avoiding hitting the inside wall, prompting the first caution flag of the race.

Most of the drivers in the latter half of the field made pit stops under the caution period. Rasmussen, Simpson, Ferrucci, and Rosenqvist were sent to the rear of the field by IndyCar officials for improperly entering their pit stalls. Malukas led the field back to speed at the lap-20 restart, followed by Newgarden, Rossi, Palou, and VeeKay. Palou was overtaken by Rahal in the third turn, but as VeeKay attempted to make a pass, Palou's car drifted up the track and collided with VeeKay, sending them both into the outside wall on the front stretch; the second caution flag was flown on lap 21 as a result. Palou sustained enough suspension damage for him to step out of his car and exit the race. After green-flag racing resumed on the 30th lap, Malukas pulled away from the rest of the field, gaining a 0.9-second advantage over Newgarden by lap 55. Meanwhile, Rasmussen used the outside line to pass numerous drivers during the green-flag stint, advancing as high as fifth place by the 62nd lap.

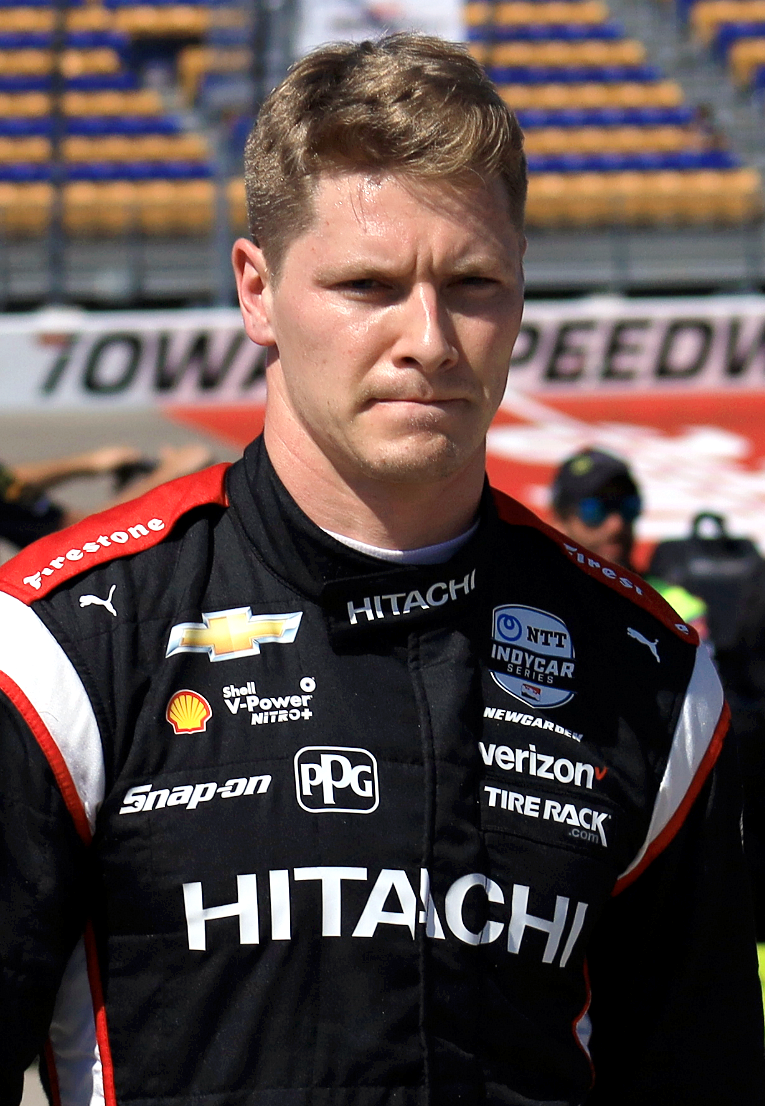
Josef Newgarden (pictured in 2022) led the final seven laps and earned his 33rd career win.

The first cycle of green-flag pit stops began with O'Ward on lap 68. After Rasmussen passed Rahal for fourth, the top three drivers conceded their positions to make stops, allowing Rasmussen to assume the lead on lap 73. Malukas' right-rear tire made slight contact with McLaughlin's left-front tire as the former merged back onto the circuit. Four laps later, Rasmussen gave up the lead to Armstrong, who himself pitted on the 85th lap and handed the first position to Dixon for eleven laps. Hauger was among the last to make a stop during the cycle, giving up the lead to O'Ward on lap 98. Rasmussen charged by Malukas on the inside line in the first turn to take third place that same lap, and made a similar maneuver to pass McLaughlin for the second position two laps later. O'Ward's lead of three seconds was quickly diminished by Rasmussen, who drove to the right-hand side of O'Ward to take the lead on lap 108.

Rasmussen's ECR teammate Rossi kicked off the second round of green-flag stops on the 113th lap. Rasmussen pitted 13 laps later, and Newgarden and Malukas both led one lap each before their stops. After rejoining the track, Rasmussen overtook O'Ward for sixth place on the 132nd lap and reclaimed the lead four laps later as all of the top five drivers, including leader Lundgaard, pitted for tires and fuel. On lap 142, Foster's car understeered and brushed the wall on the front stretch, bringing out the race's third caution flag. Dixon won the race off of pit road and resultantly gained the third position, behind Andretti Global teammates Kirkwood and Power, both of whom did not pit. Rasmussen was dropped to fourth at the lap-155 restart, but quickly made a move on the inside to try to pass Dixon which failed. He finally got by Dixon on the 173rd lap and overtook Power for the second position seven laps later. On lap 187, Rossi was the first to pit once again for the third round of green-flag pit stops. Rasmussen took the lead from Kirkwood on the 191st lap and maintained it for the next two laps until he made his final stop.

After Hauger led two laps and dove into pit road on lap 195, Ericsson was given the lead until Power passed him in turn two on the 197th lap. By lap 201, Rasmussen had overtaken Kirkwood and O'Ward and set his sights on retaking the lead. Power successfully fended off Rasmussen's attempts to pass him until lap 207, when Rasmussen drove up the track with enough momentum to pass Power in the second corner. Power, however, squeezed Rasmussen into the wall, which ricocheted Rasmussen into Power and caused the former's front wing to cut down the latter's right-rear tire. Although Rasmussen suspected his car was damaged to some extent, he elected not to pit—unlike O'Ward, Newgarden, McLaughlin, and other drivers—and led at the restart on lap 218, with Kirkwood, Malukas, Dixon, and Armstrong rounding out the top-five.

O'Ward and Newgarden's fresh tires gave them an advantage over the drivers ahead of them, as they both improved from ninth and tenth to fourth and fifth, respectively, by lap 225. Fourteen laps later, Newgarden got by O'Ward for fourth place. Meanwhile, the battle for the lead between Rasmussen and Kirkwood ended on lap 242, when Rasmussen's ill-handling car slid into the wall at the exit of turn two, allowing Kirkwood to slip by for the lead. As Rasmussen gradually fell in the running order, Newgarden took second place and got around Kirkwood for the lead on the 244th lap. He then led the final seven laps and earned his first win of the season and 33rd career victory, 1.7937 seconds ahead of Kirkwood. Malukas, O'Ward, Armstrong, Rossi, Dixon, McLaughlin, Rahal, and Simpson rounded out the top ten; the remaining classified finishers were Ferrucci, Rosenqvist, Lundgaard, Rasmussen, Hauger, Power, Ericsson, Schumacher, Collet, Siegel, Ray Robb, and VeeKay. Nine different drivers exchanged the lead 18 times during the course of the race. Malukas led two times for 73 total laps, the most of any driver, while winner Newgarden only led eight laps.

=== Post-race ===
Newgarden appeared on the podium with Kirkwood and Malukas to celebrate their respective finishes. Newgarden was pleased and admitted he initially did not believe that he had winning pace, stating: "I’m just very surprised. I mean, look, we, it’s only been a race since we haven’t won, so it’s not like it’s been a while, but I just, in the middle of the race, I don’t know that I was fully believing that we had the capability to win. and we just we kept working through it and I’m like, look, if we get another opportunity, we’re going be on the aggressive side, we’re going to be on the offense." He thanked his pit crew for supplying him with new tires. Kirkwood revealed that he and his team were debating on whether to pit or not during the last caution, but ultimately decided that staying on-track was "the right thing to do at the time.” He was still happy with the result and hoped to carry his momentum for the rest of the season. Malukas congratulated Newgarden on his win and felt that he was "fighting" his car all day, as it only handled well when the tires were worn out.

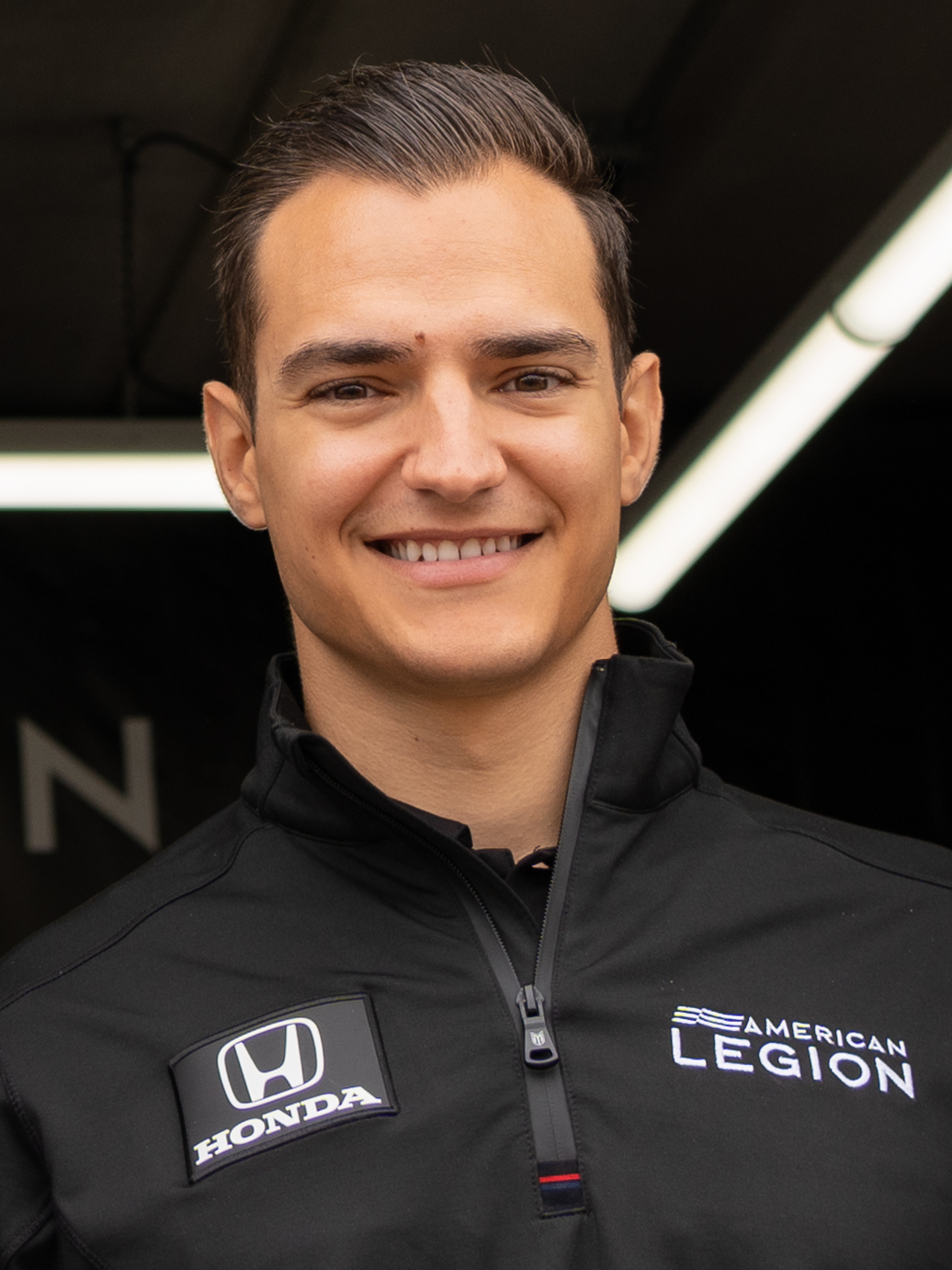
Álex Palou (pictured in 2023) failed to lead the points standings for the first time since June 2024.

Rasmussen was left chagrined with his 14th-place finish and blamed Power for taking him out of contention for the win during his interview on the Fox broadcast: "You can’t just run people into the wall, which is what happened. He ran me straight into the wall, (and) after that I had damage. [...] “So frustrating because we should have won the race today and obviously didn't." Power was later seen apologizing to Rasmussen and ECR team owner Ed Carpenter, but Rasmussen maintained his stance and told Power that "he knows what he can expect if he’s on my outside." Palou said of his lap-21 accident: "(I) need to see if there was really that space or not, but yeah, unfortunate that we ended up in the wall so early and not even trying, but it's racing." Through radio communications with his team, VeeKay opined that Palou "drove up on me." After the race, he expressed disappointment with his finish, but looked forward to the forthcoming Java House Grand Prix of Arlington.

The race featured 565 passes, 323 of which were completed on-track, 145 were for the top ten positions, and 60 were for drivers within the top-five, all of which were record-highs for the IndyCar Series at Phoenix. The race and the doubleheader weekend with NASCAR was lauded by many journalists. Archie O'Reilly of DiveBomb believed that the multi-lane racing, numerous strategies, and the compound of Firestone's tires is what attributed to the excitement of the event. Racer's Marshall Pruett wrote: "It felt so refreshing to see a bold experiment like this work and exceed all expectations. It needs to continue." The race's Fox broadcast earned an average of 1,247,000 viewers, a 77% increase from the second round of the 2025 season, the Thermal Club IndyCar Grand Prix, and a 391% increase from the last IndyCar Series race at Phoenix in 2018, which aired on NBCSN.

The final result gave Newgarden the Drivers' Championship lead with 78 points; Kirkwood advanced to second, five points behind Newgarden, while McLaughlin's 66 points dropped him to third. O'Ward, on 63 points, and Palou, on 59, were fourth and fifth, respectively, with 16 races remaining in the season. This was the first time since the 2024 XPEL Grand Prix at Road America, 29 races ago, that Palou did not lead the championship.

=== Race classification ===
Final race results
Pos.	No.	Driver	Team	Engine	Laps	Time/Retired	Pit stops	Grid	Laps led	Points
1	2	(United States) Josef Newgarden W	Team Penske	Chevrolet	250	1:51:14.4657	5	2	8	51^{1}
2	27	(United States) Kyle Kirkwood	Andretti Global	Honda	250	1:51:16.2594	3	11	47	41^{1}
3	12	(United States) David Malukas	Team Penske	Chevrolet	250	1:51:17.3069	4	1	73	39^{1}^{2}^{3}
4	5	(Mexico) Pato O'Ward	Arrow McLaren	Chevrolet	250	1:51:18.3975	5	7	10	33^{1}
5	66	(New Zealand) Marcus Armstrong	Meyer Shank Racing	Honda	250	1:51:20.9472	3	13	8	31^{1}
6	20	(United States) Alexander Rossi	ECR	Chevrolet	250	1:51:21.7568	6	6	–	28
7	9	(New Zealand) Scott Dixon W	Chip Ganassi Racing	Honda	250	1:51:22.6304	4	15	12	27^{1}
8	3	(New Zealand) Scott McLaughlin	Team Penske	Chevrolet	250	1:51:24.3443	5	5	–	24
9	15	(United States) Graham Rahal	Rahal Letterman Lanigan Racing	Honda	250	1:51:24.9347	5	3	–	22
10	8	(Cayman Islands) Kyffin Simpson	Chip Ganassi Racing	Honda	250	1:51:26.5963	5	19	–	20
11	14	(United States) Santino Ferrucci	A. J. Foyt Racing	Chevrolet	250	1:51:31.3017	5	21	–	19
12	60	(Sweden) Felix Rosenqvist	Meyer Shank Racing	Honda	250	1:51:31.6796	4	24	–	18
13	7	(Denmark) Christian Lundgaard	Arrow McLaren	Chevrolet	250	1:51:32.1241	5	17	8	18^{1}
14	21	(Denmark) Christian Rasmussen	ECR	Chevrolet	250	1:51:32.7519	5	18	69	17^{1}
15	19	(Norway) Dennis Hauger R	Dale Coyne Racing	Honda	250	1:51:33.4397	4	22	3	16^{1}
16	26	(Australia) Will Power	Andretti Global	Honda	249	1:51:33.1071	4	25	10	15^{1}
17	28	(Sweden) Marcus Ericsson	Andretti Global	Honda	249	1:51:34.0977	4	14	2	14^{1}
18	47	(Germany) Mick Schumacher R	Rahal Letterman Lanigan Racing	Honda	248	1:51:34.9878	3	4	–	12
19	4	(Brazil) Caio Collet R	A. J. Foyt Racing	Chevrolet	248	1:51:36.1321	3	23	–	11
20	6	(United States) Nolan Siegel	Arrow McLaren	Chevrolet	247	1:51:35.3306	5	9	–	10
21	77	(United States) Sting Ray Robb	Juncos Hollinger Racing	Chevrolet	246	1:51:36.8855	4	12	–	9
22	76	(Netherlands) Rinus VeeKay	Juncos Hollinger Racing	Chevrolet	245	1:51:32.6567	4	8	–	8
23	45	(England) Louis Foster	Rahal Letterman Lanigan Racing	Honda	140	Contact	2	16	–	7
24	10	(Spain) Álex Palou	Chip Ganassi Racing	Honda	21	Contact	0	10	–	6
25	18	(France) Romain Grosjean	Dale Coyne Racing	Honda	0	Mechanical	–	20	–	5
Fastest lap: (Australia) Will Power (Andretti Global) – 21.8686 (Lap 192)

Notes

- ^1 – Includes one bonus point for leading at least one lap.
- ^2 – Includes one bonus point for earning the pole position.
- ^3 – Includes two bonus points for leading the most laps.

== Championship standings after the race ==
Drivers' Championship standings
+/-	Pos.	Driver	Points
6	1	(United States) Josef Newgarden	78
2	2	(United States) Kyle Kirkwood	73
1	3	(New Zealand) Scott McLaughlin	66
1	4	(Mexico) Pato O'Ward	63
4	5	(Spain) Álex Palou	59
Sources:

- Note: Only the top five positions are included.

Previous race: 2026 Firestone Grand Prix of St. Petersburg	IndyCar Series; 2026 season	Next race: 2026 Java House Grand Prix of Arlington
Previous race: 2018 Desert Diamond West Valley Phoenix Grand Prix	Good Ranchers 250	Next race: 2027 Good Ranchers 250
