= 2026 Firestone Grand Prix of St. Petersburg =

First race of the 2026 IndyCar Series

(United States) 2026 Firestone Grand Prix of St. Petersburg
Race details
1st round of the 2026 IndyCar season
Next race →
- Layout of the St. Petersburg street course
- Date: March 1, 2026
- Official name: Firestone Grand Prix of St. Petersburg
- Location: St. Petersburg street course, St. Petersburg, Florida
- Course: Temporary street circuit 1.800 mi / 2.897 km
- Distance: 100 laps 180.000 mi / 289.682 km
- Weather: Clear 25 °C (77 °F)

Pole position
- Driver: (New Zealand) Scott McLaughlin (Team Penske)
- Time: 1:00.5426

Fastest lap
- Driver: (United States) Kyle Kirkwood (Andretti Global)
- Time: 1:02.2131 (on lap 68 of 100)

Podium
- First: (Spain) Álex Palou (Chip Ganassi Racing)
- Second: (New Zealand) Scott McLaughlin (Team Penske)
- Third: (Denmark) Christian Lundgaard (Arrow McLaren)

Chronology
Previous	Next
2025	2027

The 2026 Firestone Grand Prix of St. Petersburg was the first round of the 2026 IndyCar Series. The race was held on March 1, 2026, in St. Petersburg, Florida at the Streets of St. Petersburg. The race was contested of 100 laps. Álex Palou won the race, followed by Scott McLaughlin and Christian Lundgaard.

== Background ==
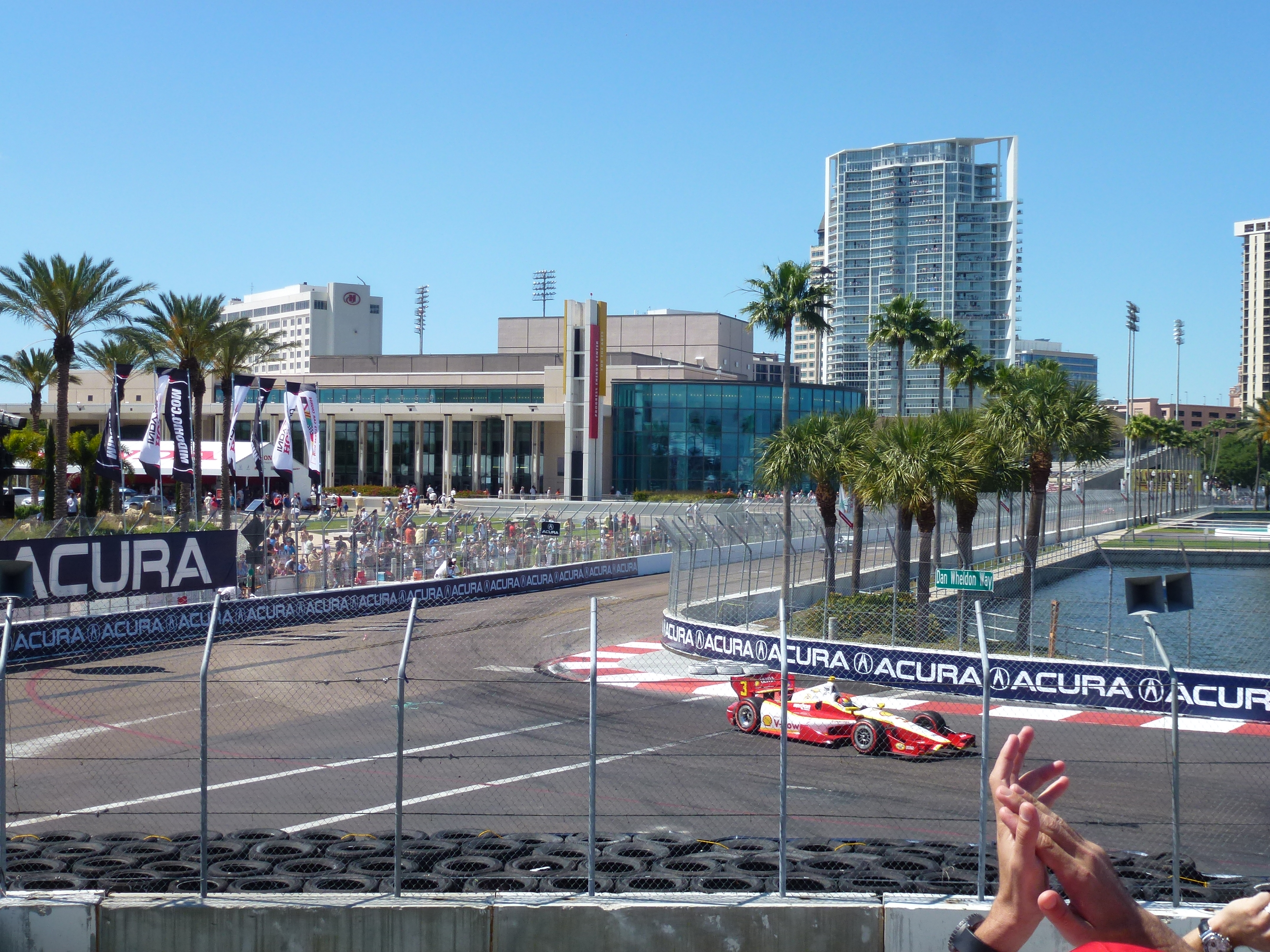
The St. Petersburg street circuit, the track where the race was held.

The St. Petersburg street circuit is a 1.800-mile long street circuit in St. Petersburg, Florida, utilizing downtown streets, and one runway of Albert Whitted Airport. The track is notable for hosting the Grand Prix of St. Petersburg, the IndyCar Series season-opening race annually. The event dates back to 1985, with Indy cars first competing in 2003.

== Entry list ==
Key	Meaning
R	Rookie
W	Past winner

No.	Driver	Team	Engine
2	(United States) Josef Newgarden W	Team Penske	Chevrolet
3	(New Zealand) Scott McLaughlin W	Team Penske	Chevrolet
4	(Brazil) Caio Collet R	A.J. Foyt Racing	Chevrolet
5	(Mexico) Pato O'Ward W	Arrow McLaren	Chevrolet
6	(United States) Nolan Siegel	Arrow McLaren	Chevrolet
7	(Denmark) Christian Lundgaard	Arrow McLaren	Chevrolet
8	(Cayman Islands) Kyffin Simpson	Chip Ganassi Racing	Honda
9	(New Zealand) Scott Dixon	Chip Ganassi Racing	Honda
10	(Spain) Álex Palou W	Chip Ganassi Racing	Honda
12	(United States) David Malukas	Team Penske	Chevrolet
14	(United States) Santino Ferrucci	A. J. Foyt Racing	Chevrolet
15	(United States) Graham Rahal W	Rahal Letterman Lanigan Racing	Honda
18	(France) Romain Grosjean	Dale Coyne Racing	Honda
19	(Norway) Dennis Hauger R	Dale Coyne Racing	Honda
20	(United States) Alexander Rossi	ECR	Chevrolet
21	(Denmark) Christian Rasmussen	ECR	Chevrolet
26	(Australia) Will Power W	Andretti Global	Honda
27	(United States) Kyle Kirkwood	Andretti Global with Curb-Agajanian	Honda
28	(Sweden) Marcus Ericsson W	Andretti Global	Honda
45	(United Kingdom) Louis Foster	Rahal Letterman Lanigan Racing	Honda
47	(Germany) Mick Schumacher R	Rahal Letterman Lanigan Racing	Honda
60	(Sweden) Felix Rosenqvist	Meyer Shank Racing with Curb-Agajanian	Honda
66	(New Zealand) Marcus Armstrong	Meyer Shank Racing with Curb-Agajanian	Honda
76	(Netherlands) Rinus VeeKay	Juncos Hollinger Racing	Chevrolet
77	(United States) Sting Ray Robb	Juncos Hollinger Racing	Chevrolet
Spotter guide

- Prema Racing was scheduled to run full-time, but was confirmed to miss the opening round.

== Practice ==
=== Practice 1 ===
The first practice session was held on Friday, February 27, 2026.

Top Practice Speeds
Pos	No.	Driver	Team	Engine	Lap Time
1	3	(New Zealand) Scott McLaughlin W	Team Penske	Chevrolet	1:01.1020
2	60	(Sweden) Felix Rosenqvist	Meyer Shank Racing	Honda	1:01.1660
3	27	(United States) Kyle Kirkwood	Andretti Global	Honda	1:01.1777
Practice 1 results

=== Practice 2 ===
The second and final practice session was held on Saturday, February 28, 2026.

Top Practice Speeds
Pos	No.	Driver	Team	Engine	Lap Time
1	7	(Denmark) Christian Lundgaard	Arrow McLaren	Chevrolet	1:01.6157
2	66	(New Zealand) Marcus Armstrong	Meyer Shank Racing	Honda	1:01.6592
3	10	(Spain) Álex Palou W	Chip Ganassi Racing	Honda	1:01.6947
Practice 2 results

== Qualifying ==
Qualifying was held on Saturday, February 28, 2026.

Scott McLaughlin, driving for Team Penske, would score the pole for the race with a time of 1:00.5426 and a speed of 107.032 mph (172.251 km/h).

Classification
Pos	No.	Driver	Team	Engine	Time	Final grid
1	3	(New Zealand) Scott McLaughlin W	Team Penske	Chevrolet	1:00.5426	1
2	28	(Sweden) Marcus Ericsson W	Andretti Global	Honda	1:00.5621	2
3	19	(Norway) Dennis Hauger R	Dale Coyne Racing	Honda	1:00.5743	3
4	10	(Spain) Álex Palou W	Chip Ganassi Racing	Honda	1:00.6842	4
5	12	(United States) David Malukas	Team Penske	Chevrolet	1:00.7638	5
6	18	(France) Romain Grosjean	Dale Coyne Racing	Honda	1:01.3462	6
7	66	(New Zealand) Marcus Armstrong	Meyer Shank Racing	Honda	1:00.7820	7
8	5	(Mexico) Pato O'Ward W	Arrow McLaren	Chevrolet	1:00.8863	8
9	45	(United Kingdom) Louis Foster	Rahal Letterman Lanigan Racing	Honda	1:00.9472	9
10	8	(Cayman Islands) Kyffin Simpson	Chip Ganassi Racing	Honda	1:00.9811	10
11	60	(Sweden) Felix Rosenqvist	Meyer Shank Racing	Honda	1:00.9840	11
12	7	(Denmark) Christian Lundgaard	Arrow McLaren	Chevrolet	1:00.9842	12
13	26	(Australia) Will Power W	Andretti Global	Honda	1:01.1936	13
14	21	(Denmark) Christian Rasmussen	ECR	Chevrolet	1:01.1835	14
15	27	(United States) Kyle Kirkwood	Andretti Global	Honda	1:01.2308	15
16	9	(New Zealand) Scott Dixon	Chip Ganassi Racing	Honda	1:01.2109	16
17	14	(United States) Santino Ferrucci	A. J. Foyt Racing	Chevrolet	1:01.2630	17
18	15	(United States) Graham Rahal W	Rahal Letterman Lanigan Racing	Honda	1:01.2257	18
19	76	(Netherlands) Rinus VeeKay	Juncos Hollinger Racing	Chevrolet	1:01.3719	19
20	77	(United States) Sting Ray Robb	Juncos Hollinger Racing	Chevrolet	1:01.3666	20
21	47	(Germany) Mick Schumacher R	Rahal Letterman Lanigan Racing	Honda	1:01.3983	21
22	6	(United States) Nolan Siegel	Arrow McLaren	Chevrolet	1:01.4498	22
23	2	(United States) Josef Newgarden W	Team Penske	Chevrolet	1:01.4174	23
24	4	(Brazil) Caio Collet R	A.J. Foyt Racing	Chevrolet	1:01.5719	24
25	20	(United States) Alexander Rossi	ECR	Chevrolet	1:01.6031	25
Qualifying results

Notes

- **Bold text** indicates fastest time.

== Warmup ==
The warmup session was held on Sunday, March 1, 2026.

Top Practice Speeds
Pos	No.	Driver	Team	Engine	Lap Time
1	5	(Mexico) Pato O'Ward W	Arrow McLaren	Chevrolet	1:01.5944
2	10	(Spain) Álex Palou W	Chip Ganassi Racing	Honda	1:01.5962
3	7	(Denmark) Christian Lundgaard	Arrow McLaren	Chevrolet	1:01.7964
Warmup results

== Race ==
The race was held on Sunday, March 1, 2026.

Classification
Pos	No.	Driver	Team	Engine	Laps	Time/Retired	Pit Stops	Grid	Laps Led	Pts.
1	10	(Spain) Álex Palou W	Chip Ganassi Racing	Honda	100	1:52:21.6997	2	4	59	53
2	3	(New Zealand) Scott McLaughlin W	Team Penske	Chevrolet	100	1:52:34.1945	2	1	34	42
3	7	(Denmark) Christian Lundgaard	Arrow McLaren	Chevrolet	100	1:52:34.6151	2	12	1	36
4	27	(United States) Kyle Kirkwood	Andretti Global	Honda	100	1:52:46.9735	2	15	–	32
5	5	(Mexico) Pato O'Ward W	Arrow McLaren	Chevrolet	100	1:52:47.7751	2	8	–	30
6	28	(Sweden) Marcus Ericsson W	Andretti Global	Honda	100	1:52:47.9560	2	2	1	29
7	2	(United States) Josef Newgarden W	Team Penske	Chevrolet	100	1:52:48.1216	2	23	1	27
8	18	(France) Romain Grosjean	Dale Coyne Racing	Honda	100	1:52:49.7386	2	6	–	24
9	76	(Netherlands) Rinus VeeKay	Juncos Hollinger Racing	Chevrolet	100	1:52:50.4148	3	19	–	22
10	19	(Norway) Dennis Hauger R	Dale Coyne Racing	Honda	100	1:52:51.5719	2	3	–	20
11	66	(New Zealand) Marcus Armstrong	Meyer Shank Racing	Honda	100	1:52:52.1680	2	7	–	19
12	60	(Sweden) Felix Rosenqvist	Meyer Shank Racing	Honda	100	1:52:52.5102	3	11	–	18
13	12	(United States) David Malukas	Team Penske	Chevrolet	100	1:52:55.4753	3	5	–	17
14	45	(United Kingdom) Louis Foster	Rahal Letterman Lanigan Racing	Honda	100	1:52:59.7387	3	9	2	17
15	8	(Cayman Islands) Kyffin Simpson	Chip Ganassi Racing	Honda	100	1:53:00.6090	2	10	–	15
16	20	(United States) Alexander Rossi	ECR	Chevrolet	100	1:53:11.3124	4	25	–	14
17	4	(Brazil) Caio Collet R	A.J. Foyt Enterprises	Chevrolet	100	1:53:23.6771	3	24	–	13
18	15	(United States) Graham Rahal W	Rahal Letterman Lanigan Racing	Honda	100	1:53:24.8340	2	18	–	12
19	21	(Denmark) Christian Rasmussen	ECR	Chevrolet	100	1:53:24.8909	3	14	–	11
20	6	(United States) Nolan Siegel	Arrow McLaren	Chevrolet	99	1:52:23.5695	3	22	–	10
21	77	(United States) Sting Ray Robb	Juncos Hollinger Racing	Chevrolet	93	1:52:24.9430	4	20	–	9
22	26	(Australia) Will Power W	Andretti Global	Honda	55	Retired	2	13	–	8
23	9	(New Zealand) Scott Dixon	Chip Ganassi Racing	Honda	39	Lost right-rear wheel	1	16	2	8
24	14	(United States) Santino Ferrucci	A.J. Foyt Enterprises	Chevrolet	0	Contact	0	17	–	6
25	47	(Germany) Mick Schumacher R	Rahal Letterman Lanigan Racing	Honda	0	Contact	0	21	–	5
Fastest lap: (United States) Kyle Kirkwood (Andretti Global) – 1:02.2131 (Lap 68)
Race results

== Championship standings after the race ==
Drivers' Championship standings

	Pos.	Driver	Points
Unchanged	1	(Spain) Álex Palou	53
Unchanged	2	(New Zealand) Scott McLaughlin	42
Unchanged	3	(Denmark) Christian Lundgaard	36
Unchanged	4	(United States) Kyle Kirkwood	32
Unchanged	5	(Mexico) Pato O'Ward	30
Point standings

Engine manufacturer standings

	Pos.	Manufacturer	Points
Unchanged	1	Honda	87
Unchanged	2	Chevrolet	76
Point standings

- Note: Only the top five positions are included.

Previous race: 2025 Borchetta Bourbon Music City Grand Prix	IndyCar Series; 2026 season	Next race: 2026 Good Ranchers 250
Previous race: 2025 Firestone Grand Prix of St. Petersburg	Firestone Grand Prix of St. Petersburg	Next race: 2027 Firestone Grand Prix of St. Petersburg
