= 2025 Thermal Club IndyCar Grand Prix =

Indycar race held in Thermal, California

(United States) 2025 Thermal Club IndyCar Grand Prix
Race details
2nd round of the 2025 IndyCar season
← Previous race	Next race →
- Layout of the Thermal Club circuit
- Date: March 23, 2025
- Official name: Thermal Club IndyCar Grand Prix
- Location: Thermal Club, Thermal, California
- Course: Permanent circuit 3.067 mi / 4.936 km
- Distance: 65 laps 199.36 mi / 320.84 km
- Weather: Clear 33 °C (91 °F)

Pole position
- Driver: (Mexico) Pato O'Ward (Arrow McLaren)
- Time: 01:39.9567

Fastest lap
- Driver: (Mexico) Pato O'Ward (Arrow McLaren)
- Time: 1:43.3875 (on lap 3 of 65)

Podium
- First: (Spain) Álex Palou (Chip Ganassi Racing)
- Second: (Mexico) Pato O'Ward (Arrow McLaren)
- Third: (Denmark) Christian Lundgaard (Arrow McLaren)

Chronology
Previous
2024

The 2025 Thermal Club IndyCar Grand Prix was the second round of the 2025 IndyCar season. The race was held on March 23, 2025, at the Thermal Club private race resort in Thermal, California. The race took the scheduled 65 laps to complete. Álex Palou won the race, Pato O'Ward finished 2nd, and Christian Lundgaard finished 3rd. Colton Herta and Felix Rosenqvist rounded out the top five, while Will Power, Marcus Armstrong, Kyle Kirkwood, Alexander Rossi, and Scott Dixon rounded out the top ten.

== Entry list ==
Key	Meaning
R	Rookie
W	Past winner

No.	Driver	Team	Engine
2	(United States) Josef Newgarden	Team Penske	Chevrolet
3	(New Zealand) Scott McLaughlin	Team Penske	Chevrolet
4	(United States) David Malukas	A. J. Foyt Racing	Chevrolet
5	(Mexico) Pato O'Ward	Arrow McLaren	Chevrolet
6	(United States) Nolan Siegel R	Arrow McLaren	Chevrolet
7	(Denmark) Christian Lundgaard	Arrow McLaren	Chevrolet
8	(Cayman Islands) Kyffin Simpson	Chip Ganassi Racing	Honda
9	(New Zealand) Scott Dixon	Chip Ganassi Racing	Honda
10	(Spain) Álex Palou W	Chip Ganassi Racing	Honda
12	(Australia) Will Power	Team Penske	Chevrolet
14	(United States) Santino Ferrucci	A. J. Foyt Racing	Chevrolet
15	(United States) Graham Rahal	Rahal Letterman Lanigan Racing	Honda
18	(Netherlands) Rinus VeeKay	Dale Coyne Racing	Honda
20	(United States) Alexander Rossi	ECR	Chevrolet
21	(Denmark) Christian Rasmussen	ECR	Chevrolet
24	(United Kingdom) Jack Harvey	DRR-Cusick Motorsports	Chevrolet
26	(United States) Colton Herta	Andretti Global with Curb-Agajanian	Honda
27	(United States) Kyle Kirkwood	Andretti Global	Honda
28	(Sweden) Marcus Ericsson	Andretti Global	Honda
30	(Canada) Devlin DeFrancesco	Rahal Letterman Lanigan Racing	Honda
33	(United States) Ed Carpenter	ECR	Chevrolet
45	(United Kingdom) Louis Foster R	Rahal Letterman Lanigan Racing	Honda
51	(United States) Jacob Abel R	Dale Coyne Racing	Honda
60	(Sweden) Felix Rosenqvist	Meyer Shank Racing	Honda
66	(New Zealand) Marcus Armstrong	Meyer Shank Racing	Honda
76	(United States) Conor Daly	Juncos Hollinger Racing	Chevrolet
77	(United States) Sting Ray Robb	Juncos Hollinger Racing	Chevrolet
83	(Israel) Robert Shwartzman R	Prema Racing	Chevrolet
90	(United Kingdom) Callum Ilott	Prema Racing	Chevrolet

== Practice ==
=== Practice 1 ===
Top Practice Speeds
Pos	No.	Driver	Team	Engine	Lap Time
1	10	(Spain) Álex Palou W	Chip Ganassi Racing	Honda	01:40.5486
2	27	(United States) Kyle Kirkwood	Andretti Global	Honda	01:40.6387
3	28	(Sweden) Marcus Ericsson	Andretti Global	Honda	01:40.7370
Practice 1 results

=== Practice 2 ===
Top Practice Speeds
Pos	No.	Driver	Team	Engine	Lap Time
1	7	(Denmark) Christian Lundgaard	Arrow McLaren	Chevrolet	01:40.6421
2	10	(Spain) Álex Palou W	Chip Ganassi Racing	Honda	01:41.1247
3	28	(Sweden) Marcus Ericsson	Andretti Global	Honda	01:41.2831
Practice 2 results

== Qualifying ==
Qualifying was held at 2:00 PM PT on March 22, 2025.

=== Qualifying classification ===
Pos	No.	Driver	Team	Engine	Time	Final grid							
Pos	No.	Driver	Team	Engine	Time	Final grid	1	5	(Mexico) Pato O'Ward	Arrow McLaren	Chevrolet	**01:39.9567**	1
Pos	No.	Driver	Team	Engine	2	Final grid	7	(Denmark) Christian Lundgaard	Arrow McLaren	Chevrolet	01:40.1245	2	
3	10	(Spain) Álex Palou W	Chip Ganassi Racing	Honda	01:40.3092	3							
4	26	(United States) Colton Herta	Andretti Global with Curb-Agajanian	Honda	01:40.3978	4							
5	28	(Sweden) Marcus Ericsson	Andretti Global	Honda	01:40.7435	5							
6	20	(United States) Alexander Rossi	ECR	Chevrolet	01:41.0359	6							
7	66	(New Zealand) Marcus Armstrong	Meyer Shank Racing	Honda	01:40.6824	7							
8	27	(United States) Kyle Kirkwood	Andretti Global	Honda	01:40.7306	8							
9	60	(Sweden) Felix Rosenqvist	Meyer Shank Racing	Honda	01:40.9824	9							
10	45	(United Kingdom) Louis Foster R	Rahal Letterman Lanigan Racing	Honda	01:41.2256	10							
11	9	(New Zealand) Scott Dixon	Chip Ganassi Racing	Honda	01:41.2319	11							
12	4	(United States) David Malukas	A. J. Foyt Racing	Chevrolet	01:41.2997	12							
13	18	(Netherlands) Rinus VeeKay	Dale Coyne Racing	Honda	01:40.6490	13							
14	14	(United States) Santino Ferrucci	A. J. Foyt Racing	Chevrolet	01:40.6658	14							
15	76	(United States) Conor Daly	Juncos Hollinger Racing	Chevrolet	01:40.6592	15							
16	6	(United States) Nolan Siegel R	Arrow McLaren	Chevrolet	01:40.7040	16							
17	2	(United States) Josef Newgarden	Team Penske	Chevrolet	01:40.6956	17							
18	15	(United States) Graham Rahal	Rahal Letterman Lanigan Racing	Honda	01:40.8433	18							
19	21	(Denmark) Christian Rasmussen	ECR	Chevrolet	01:40.8884	19							
20	8	(Cayman Islands) Kyffin Simpson	Chip Ganassi Racing	Honda	01:41.1684	20							
21	12	(Australia) Will Power	Team Penske	Chevrolet	01:40.9750	21							
22	90	(United Kingdom) Callum Ilott	Prema Racing	Chevrolet	01:41.2929	22							
23	51	(United States) Jacob Abel R	Dale Coyne Racing	Honda	01:41.1118	23							
24	77	(United States) Sting Ray Robb	Juncos Hollinger Racing	Chevrolet	01:41.3356	24							
25	3	(New Zealand) Scott McLaughlin	Team Penske	Chevrolet	01:41.5133	25							
26	30	(Canada) Devlin DeFrancesco	Rahal Letterman Lanigan Racing	Honda	01:41.3664	26							
27	83	(Israel) Robert Shwartzman R	Prema Racing	Chevrolet	01:43.0781	27							
Qualifying results

Notes

- **Bold text** indicates fastest time.

== Warmup ==
Top Practice Speeds
Pos	No.	Driver	Team	Engine	Lap Time
1	10	(Spain) Álex Palou W	Chip Ganassi Racing	Honda	01:40.3667
2	9	(New Zealand) Scott Dixon	Chip Ganassi Racing	Honda	01:40.8267
3	2	(United States) Josef Newgarden	Team Penske	Chevrolet	01:40.9362
Warmup results

== Race ==
The race was held at 12:00 PM PT on March 23, 2025.

=== Race classification ===
Pos	No.	Driver	Team	Engine	Laps	Time/Retired	Pit Stops	Grid	Laps Led	Pts.
1	10	(Spain) Álex Palou W	Chip Ganassi Racing	Honda	65	01:56:23.2677	3	3	13	51
2	5	(Mexico) Pato O'Ward	Arrow McLaren	Chevrolet	65	01:56:33.4531	3	1	51	44
3	7	(Denmark) Christian Lundgaard	Arrow McLaren	Chevrolet	65	01:56:46.0007	3	2	-	35
4	26	(United States) Colton Herta	Andretti Global	Honda	65	01:56:58.3399	3	4	-	32
5	60	(Sweden) Felix Rosenqvist	Meyer Shank Racing	Honda	65	01:56:58.8974	3	9	-	30
6	12	(Australia) Will Power	Team Penske	Chevrolet	65	01:57:03.6464	3	21	-	28
7	66	(New Zealand) Marcus Armstrong	Meyer Shank Racing	Honda	65	01:57:04.7803	3	7	-	26
8	27	(United States) Kyle Kirkwood	Andretti Global	Honda	65	01:57:15.5158	3	8	-	24
9	20	(United States) Alexander Rossi	ECR	Chevrolet	65	01:57:15.8750	3	6	1	23
10	9	(New Zealand) Scott Dixon	Chip Ganassi Racing	Honda	65	01:57:17.3202	3	11	-	20
11	15	(United States) Graham Rahal	Rahal Letterman Lanigan Racing	Honda	65	01:57:21.5409	3	18	-	19
12	21	(Denmark) Christian Rasmussen	ECR	Chevrolet	65	01:57:24.3275	3	19	-	18
13	2	(United States) Josef Newgarden	Team Penske	Chevrolet	65	01:57:33.6959	3	17	-	17
14	14	(United States) Santino Ferrucci	A. J. Foyt Racing	Chevrolet	65	01:57:36.3049	3	14	-	16
15	8	(Cayman Islands) Kyffin Simpson	Chip Ganassi Racing	Honda	65	01:57:36.5074	3	20	-	15
16	76	(United States) Connor Daly	Juncos Hollinger Racing	Chevrolet	65	01:57:05.3097	3	15	-	15
17	18	(Netherlands) Rinus VeeKay	Dale Coyne Racing	Honda	65	01:58:06.9962	3	13	-	13
18	4	(United States) David Malukas	A. J. Foyt Racing	Chevrolet	65	01:58:10.5788	3	12	-	12
19	6	(United States) Nolan Siegel R	Arrow McLaren	Chevrolet	65	01:58:11.0634	4	16	-	11
20	30	(Canada) Devlin DeFrancesco	Rahal Letterman Lanigan Racing	Honda	64	01:56:28.8054	3	26	-	10
21	28	(Sweden) Marcus Ericsson	Andretti Global	Honda	64	01:56:32.5720	3	5	-	9
22	83	(Israel) Robert Shwartzman R	Prema Racing	Chevrolet	64	01:56:41.3067	3	27	-	8
23	77	(United States) Sting Ray Robb	Juncos Hollinger Racing	Chevrolet	64	01:56:51.8213	3	24	-	7
24	45	(United Kingdom) Louis Foster R	Rahal Letterman Lanigan Racing	Honda	64	01:57:08.6783	3	10	-	6
25	51	(United States) Jacob Abel R	Dale Coyne Racing	Honda	64	01:57:22.1476	3	23	-	5
26	90	(United Kingdom) Callum Ilott	Prema Racing	Chevrolet	64	01:57:48.9642	4	22	-	5
27	3	(New Zealand) Scott McLaughlin	Team Penske	Chevrolet	53	01:46:05.5060	3	25	-	5
Fastest lap: (Mexico) Pato O'Ward (Arrow McLaren) - 1:43.3875 (Lap 3)

== Championship standings after the race ==
Drivers' Championship standings

	Pos.	Driver	Points
Unchanged	1	(Spain) Álex Palou	102
	2	(Mexico) Pato O'Ward	63 (–39)
	3	(New Zealand) Scott Dixon	61 (–41)
	4	(Denmark) Christian Lundgaard	60 (–42)
	5	(Sweden) Felix Rosenqvist	56 (–46)

Engine manufacturer standings

	Pos.	Manufacturer	Points
Unchanged	1	Honda	182
Unchanged	2	Chevrolet	144 (–38)

- Note: Only the top five positions are included.

== Notes ==
Previous race: 2025 Firestone Grand Prix of St. Petersburg	IndyCar Series; 2025 season	Next race: 2025 Acura Grand Prix of Long Beach
Previous race: 2024 $1 Million Challenge	Thermal Club IndyCar Grand Prix	Next race: —
