= 2024 $1 Million Challenge =

Indycar exhibition race held in Thermal, California

Race details
Date	March 24, 2024
Official name	$1 Million Challenge
Location	Thermal Club, Thermal, California
Course	Permanent circuit 3.067 mi (4.936 km)
Distance	All-Star Race; 20 Laps; 61.34 mi (98.72 km)
- Heat 1

Pole
Driver	(Sweden) Felix Rosenqvist	Meyer Shank Racing
Time	01:38.5831

Fastest Lap
Driver	(New Zealand) Scott Dixon	Chip Ganassi Racing
Time	01:40.7795 (lap 3)

Podium
First	(Sweden) Felix Rosenqvist	Meyer Shank Racing
Second	(New Zealand) Scott McLaughlin	Team Penske
Third	(United States) Josef Newgarden	Team Penske
- Heat 2

Pole
Driver	(Spain) Álex Palou	Chip Ganassi Racing
Time	01:38.5675

Fastest Lap
Driver	(Spain) Álex Palou	Chip Ganassi Racing
Time	01:39.8051 (lap 3)

Podium
First	(Spain) Álex Palou	Chip Ganassi Racing
Second	(New Zealand) Marcus Armstrong	Chip Ganassi Racing
Third	(United States) Graham Rahal	Rahal Letterman Lanigan Racing
- Feature Race

Pole
Driver	(Spain) Álex Palou (Note: Pole position for the main race was determined by the fastest qualifying time of the two heat winners.)	Chip Ganassi Racing
Time	01:38.5675

Fastest Lap
Driver	(Spain) Álex Palou	Chip Ganassi Racing
Time	01:41.6145 (lap 12)

Podium
First	(Spain) Álex Palou	Chip Ganassi Racing
Second	(New Zealand) Scott McLaughlin	Team Penske
Third	(Sweden) Felix Rosenqvist	Meyer Shank Racing
- Chronology
- Next
- 2025

The 2024 $1 Million Challenge was a non-championship round held as part of the 2024 IndyCar Series. The race was held on March 24, 2024 at the Thermal Club private race resort in Thermal, California. The feature race consisted of 20 laps and was won by Álex Palou.

It was the seventh American championship open-wheel racing event in Riverside County, the first since the 1983 Budweiser 500K, held in the Edgemont area of Riverside County, about 75 miles northwest of the Coachella Valley where the Thermal Club is located.

== Entry list ==
Key	Meaning
R	Rookie
W	Past winner

No.	Driver	Team	Engine
2	(United States) Josef Newgarden	Team Penske	Chevrolet
3	(New Zealand) Scott McLaughlin	Team Penske	Chevrolet
4	(Cayman Islands) Kyffin Simpson R	Chip Ganassi Racing	Honda
5	(Mexico) Pato O'Ward	Arrow McLaren	Chevrolet
6	(United Kingdom) Callum Ilott	Arrow McLaren	Chevrolet
7	(United States) Alexander Rossi	Arrow McLaren	Chevrolet
8	(Sweden) Linus Lundqvist R	Chip Ganassi Racing	Honda
9	(New Zealand) Scott Dixon	Chip Ganassi Racing	Honda
10	(Spain) Álex Palou	Chip Ganassi Racing	Honda
11	(New Zealand) Marcus Armstrong	Chip Ganassi Racing	Honda
12	(Australia) Will Power	Team Penske	Chevrolet
14	(United States) Santino Ferrucci	A. J. Foyt Enterprises	Chevrolet
15	(United States) Graham Rahal	Rahal Letterman Lanigan Racing	Honda
18	(United States) Nolan Siegel R	Dale Coyne Racing	Honda
20	(Denmark) Christian Rasmussen R	Ed Carpenter Racing	Chevrolet
21	(Netherlands) Rinus VeeKay	Ed Carpenter Racing	Chevrolet
26	(United States) Colton Herta	Andretti Global with Curb-Agajanian	Honda
27	(United States) Kyle Kirkwood	Andretti Global	Honda
28	(Sweden) Marcus Ericsson	Andretti Global	Honda
30	(Brazil) Pietro Fittipaldi	Rahal Letterman Lanigan Racing	Honda
41	(United States) Sting Ray Robb	A. J. Foyt Enterprises	Chevrolet
45	(Denmark) Christian Lundgaard	Rahal Letterman Lanigan Racing	Honda
51	(United States) Colin Braun R	Dale Coyne Racing with Rick Ware Racing	Honda
60	(Sweden) Felix Rosenqvist	Meyer Shank Racing	Honda
66	(United Kingdom) Tom Blomqvist R	Meyer Shank Racing	Honda
77	(France) Romain Grosjean	Juncos Hollinger Racing	Chevrolet
78	(Argentina) Agustín Canapino	Juncos Hollinger Racing	Chevrolet

== Qualifying ==
Qualifying started at 5:00 PM PT on March 23, 2024. The 27 entries were divided into two groups determined by a random draw, with each group competing in separate heat races. Drivers were permitted to use up to 40 seconds of push-to-pass, marking the first time competitors have been allowed to use PTP during an IndyCar qualifying session.

=== Heat 1 Qualifying ===
- Group 1

Pos	No.	Driver	Team	Engine	Time	Final grid
1	60	(Sweden) Felix Rosenqvist	Meyer Shank Racing	Honda	**01:38.5831**	1
2	3	(New Zealand) Scott McLaughlin	Team Penske	Chevrolet	01:38.6068	2
3	21	(Netherlands) Rinus VeeKay	Ed Carpenter Racing	Chevrolet	01:38.6283	3
4	45	(Denmark) Christian Lundgaard	Rahal Letterman Lanigan Racing	Honda	01:38.6394	4
5	2	(United States) Josef Newgarden	Team Penske	Chevrolet	01:38.7926	5
6	12	(Australia) Will Power	Team Penske	Chevrolet	01:38.8056	6
7	77	(France) Romain Grosjean	Juncos Hollinger Racing	Chevrolet	01:38.8774	7
8	78	(Argentina) Agustín Canapino	Juncos Hollinger Racing	Chevrolet	01:39.5994	8
9	9	(New Zealand) Scott Dixon	Chip Ganassi Racing	Honda	01:39.7074	9
10	14	(United States) Santino Ferrucci	A. J. Foyt Enterprises	Chevrolet	01:39.7400	10
11	26	(United States) Colton Herta	Andretti Global with Curb-Agajanian	Honda	01:39.8331	11
12	18	(United States) Nolan Siegel **R**	Dale Coyne Racing	Honda	01:40.1218	12
13	27	(United States) Kyle Kirkwood	Andretti Global	Honda	01:40.1268	13
14	41	(United States) Sting Ray Robb	A. J. Foyt Enterprises	Chevrolet	01:41.5352	14

Notes

- **Bold text** indicates fastest time set in session.

=== Heat 2 Qualifying ===
- Group 2

Pos	No.	Driver	Team	Engine	Time	Final grid
1	10	(Spain) Álex Palou	Chip Ganassi Racing	Honda	**01:38.5675**	1
2	11	(New Zealand) Marcus Armstrong	Chip Ganassi Racing	Honda	01:38.7575	2
3	15	(United States) Graham Rahal	Rahal Letterman Lanigan Racing	Honda	01:38.9723	3
4	8	(Sweden) Linus Lundqvist **R**	Chip Ganassi Racing	Honda	01:39.0685	4
5	66	(United Kingdom) Tom Blomqvist **R**	Meyer Shank Racing	Honda	01:39.0820	5
6	30	(Brazil) Pietro Fittipaldi	Rahal Letterman Lanigan Racing	Honda	01:39.1117	6
7	7	(United States) Alexander Rossi	Arrow McLaren	Chevrolet	01:39.1140	7
8	6	(United Kingdom) Callum Ilott	Arrow McLaren	Chevrolet	01:39.2575	8
9	5	(Mexico) Pato O'Ward	Arrow McLaren	Chevrolet	01:39.4293	9
10	4	(Cayman Islands) Kyffin Simpson **R**	Chip Ganassi Racing	Honda	01:39.9502	10
11	20	(Denmark) Christian Rasmussen **R**	Ed Carpenter Racing	Chevrolet	01:40.2820	11
12	51	(United States) Colin Braun **R**	Dale Coyne Racing with Rick Ware Racing	Honda	01:40.7843	12
13	28	(Sweden) Marcus Ericsson	Andretti Global	Honda	No Time	13

Notes

- **Bold text** indicates fastest time set in session.

== Results ==
The event started at 9:15 am PT on March 24, 2024.

Each heat race was 10 laps or 20 minutes. The top six finishers from each heat advanced to the All-Star Race. The faster of the two heat winners in qualifying earned pole for the feature race, and determined grid positioning. The feature race was 20 laps, with a half-time break at lap 10.

=== Heat 1 ===
Pos	No.	Driver	Team	Engine	Laps	Time/Retired	Grid
1	60	(Sweden) Felix Rosenqvist	Meyer Shank Racing	Honda	8	13:30.9622	1
2	3	(New Zealand) Scott McLaughlin	Team Penske	Chevrolet	8	+0.4971	2
3	2	(United States) Josef Newgarden	Team Penske	Chevrolet	8	+1.7664	5
4	45	(Denmark) Christian Lundgaard	Rahal Letterman Lanigan Racing	Honda	8	+6.3835	4
5	78	(Argentina) Agustín Canapino	Juncos Hollinger Racing	Chevrolet	8	+8.7479	8
6	26	(United States) Colton Herta	Andretti Global with Curb-Agajanian	Honda	8	+15.8230	11
7	18	(United States) Nolan Siegel R	Dale Coyne Racing	Honda	8	+16.4113	12
8	14	(United States) Santino Ferrucci	A.J. Foyt Enterprises	Chevrolet	8	+17.0148	10
9	12	(Australia) Will Power	Team Penske	Chevrolet	8	+17.8747	6
10	27	(United States) Kyle Kirkwood	Andretti Global	Honda	8	+21.4089	13
11	41	(United States) Sting Ray Robb	A.J. Foyt Enterprises	Chevrolet	8	+21.7870	14
12	9	(New Zealand) Scott Dixon	Chip Ganassi Racing	Honda	8	+25.7655	9
13	21	(Netherlands) Rinus VeeKay	Ed Carpenter Racing	Chevrolet	0	Contact	3
14	77	(France) Romain Grosjean	Juncos Hollinger Racing	Chevrolet	0	Contact	7
Fastest lap: (New Zealand) Scott Dixon (Chip Ganassi Racing) – 1:40.7795 (lap 3)

=== Heat 2 ===
Pos	No.	Driver	Team	Engine	Laps	Time/Retired	Grid
1	10	(Spain) Álex Palou	Chip Ganassi Racing	Honda	10	16:50.6089	1
2	11	(New Zealand) Marcus Armstrong	Chip Ganassi Racing	Honda	10	+5.3375	2
3	15	(United States) Graham Rahal	Rahal Letterman Lanigan Racing	Honda	10	+18.0911	3
4	8	(Sweden) Linus Lundqvist R	Chip Ganassi Racing	Honda	10	+18.9634	4
5	30	(Brazil) Pietro Fittipaldi	Rahal Letterman Lanigan Racing	Honda	10	+19.7151	6
6	7	(United States) Alexander Rossi	Arrow McLaren	Chevrolet	10	+20.3456	7
7	5	(Mexico) Pato O'Ward	Arrow McLaren	Chevrolet	10	+21.0031	9
8	66	(United Kingdom) Tom Blomqvist R	Meyer Shank Racing	Honda	10	+23.1783	5
9	6	(United Kingdom) Callum Ilott	Arrow McLaren	Chevrolet	10	+23.3908	8
10	20	(Denmark) Christian Rasmussen R	Ed Carpenter Racing	Chevrolet	10	+24.1938	11
11	4	(Cayman Islands) Kyffin Simpson R	Chip Ganassi Racing	Honda	10	+25.8233	10
12	28	(Sweden) Marcus Ericsson	Andretti Global	Honda	10	+26.5815	13
13	51	(United States) Colin Braun R	Dale Coyne Racing with Rick Ware Racing	Honda	10	+28.8333	12
Fastest lap: (Spain) Álex Palou (Chip Ganassi Racing) – 1:39.8051 (lap 3)

=== All-Star Race ===
Pos	No.	Driver	Team	Engine	Laps	Time/Retired	Grid
1	10	(Spain) Álex Palou	Chip Ganassi Racing	Honda	20	39:30.2292	1
2	3	(New Zealand) Scott McLaughlin	Team Penske	Chevrolet	20	+5.7929	4
3	60	(Sweden) Felix Rosenqvist	Meyer Shank Racing	Honda	20	+9.7587	2
4	26	(United States) Colton Herta	Andretti Global with Curb-Agajanian	Honda	20	+13.1126	12
5	11	(New Zealand) Marcus Armstrong	Chip Ganassi Racing	Honda	20	+15.0938	3
6	8	(Sweden) Linus Lundqvist R	Chip Ganassi Racing	Honda	20	+16.1064	7
7	7	(United States) Alexander Rossi	Arrow McLaren	Chevrolet	20	+16.5393	10
8	2	(United States) Josef Newgarden	Team Penske	Chevrolet	20	+17.6675	6
9	45	(Denmark) Christian Lundgaard	Rahal Letterman Lanigan Racing	Honda	20	+19.7073	11
10	78	(Argentina) Agustín Canapino	Juncos Hollinger Racing	Chevrolet	20	+20.4100	9
11	15	(United States) Graham Rahal	Rahal Letterman Lanigan Racing	Honda	9	Mechanical	5
DSQ	30	(Brazil) Pietro Fittipaldi	Rahal Letterman Lanigan Racing	Honda		Disqualified	8
Fastest lap: (Spain) Álex Palou (Chip Ganassi Racing) – 1:41.6145 (lap 12)

== Footnotes ==
Previous race: 2024 Firestone Grand Prix of St. Petersburg	NTT IndyCar Series; 2024 season	Next race: 2024 Acura Grand Prix of Long Beach
Previous race: —	$1 Million Challenge	Next race: 2025 Thermal Club IndyCar Grand Prix
