= 2025 Firestone Grand Prix of St. Petersburg =

Indycar race held in St. Petersburg, Florida

(United States) 2025 Firestone Grand Prix of St. Petersburg
Race details
1st round of the 2025 IndyCar season
Next race →
- Layout of the Firestone Grand Prix of St. Petersburg
- Date: March 2, 2025
- Official name: Firestone Grand Prix of St. Petersburg
- Location: Streets of St. Petersburg, St. Petersburg, Florida
- Course: Temporary street circuit 1.800 mi / 2.897 km
- Distance: 100 laps 180.000 mi / 289.682 km
- Weather: Clear 22 °C (72 °F)

Pole position
- Driver: (New Zealand) Scott McLaughlin (Team Penske)
- Time: 59.4624

Fastest lap
- Driver: (United States) Josef Newgarden (Team Penske)
- Time: 1:01.6900 (on lap 89 of 100)

Podium
- First: (Spain) Álex Palou (Chip Ganassi Racing)
- Second: (New Zealand) Scott Dixon (Chip Ganassi Racing)
- Third: (United States) Josef Newgarden (Team Penske)

Chronology
Previous	Next
2024	2026

The 2025 Firestone Grand Prix of St. Petersburg was the first round of the 2025 IndyCar season. The race was held on March 2, 2025, in St. Petersburg, Florida at the streets of St. Petersburg. The race took the scheduled 100 laps to complete. Álex Palou won the race, Scott Dixon finished 2nd, and Josef Newgarden finished 3rd. Scott McLaughlin and Kyle Kirkwood rounded out the top five, while Marcus Ericsson, Felix Rosenqvist, Christian Lundgaard, Rinus VeeKay, and Alexander Rossi rounded out the top ten.

A collision on the first lap resulted in the retiring of Nolan Siegel, Will Power, and Louis Foster.

== Entry list ==
Key	Meaning
R	Rookie
W	Past winner

No.	Driver	Team	Engine
2	(United States) Josef Newgarden W	Team Penske	Chevrolet
3	(New Zealand) Scott McLaughlin W	Team Penske	Chevrolet
4	(United States) David Malukas	A. J. Foyt Racing	Chevrolet
5	(Mexico) Pato O'Ward W	Arrow McLaren	Chevrolet
6	(United States) Nolan Siegel R	Arrow McLaren	Chevrolet
7	(Denmark) Christian Lundgaard	Arrow McLaren	Chevrolet
8	(Cayman Islands) Kyffin Simpson	Chip Ganassi Racing	Honda
9	(New Zealand) Scott Dixon	Chip Ganassi Racing	Honda
10	(Spain) Álex Palou	Chip Ganassi Racing	Honda
12	(Australia) Will Power W	Team Penske	Chevrolet
14	(United States) Santino Ferrucci	A. J. Foyt Racing	Chevrolet
15	(United States) Graham Rahal W	Rahal Letterman Lanigan Racing	Honda
18	(Netherlands) Rinus VeeKay	Dale Coyne Racing	Honda
20	(United States) Alexander Rossi W	ECR	Chevrolet
21	(Denmark) Christian Rasmussen	ECR	Chevrolet
24	(United Kingdom) Jack Harvey	DRR-Cusick Motorsports	Chevrolet
26	(United States) Colton Herta W	Andretti Global with Curb-Agajanian	Honda
27	(United States) Kyle Kirkwood	Andretti Global	Honda
28	(Sweden) Marcus Ericsson W	Andretti Global	Honda
30	(Canada) Devlin DeFrancesco	Rahal Letterman Lanigan Racing	Honda
33	(United States) Ed Carpenter	ECR	Chevrolet
45	(United Kingdom) Louis Foster R	Rahal Letterman Lanigan Racing	Honda
51	(United States) Jacob Abel R	Dale Coyne Racing	Honda
60	(Sweden) Felix Rosenqvist	Meyer Shank Racing	Honda
66	(New Zealand) Marcus Armstrong	Meyer Shank Racing	Honda
76	(United States) Conor Daly	Juncos Hollinger Racing	Chevrolet
77	(United States) Sting Ray Robb	Juncos Hollinger Racing	Chevrolet
83	(Israel) Robert Shwartzman R	Prema Racing	Chevrolet
90	(United Kingdom) Callum Ilott	Prema Racing	Chevrolet

== Practice ==
=== Practice 1 ===
Top Practice Speeds
Pos	No.	Driver	Team	Engine	Lap Time
1	27	(United States) Kyle Kirkwood	Andretti Global	Honda	01:00.4409
2	10	(Spain) Álex Palou	Chip Ganassi Racing	Honda	01:00.6004
3	3	(New Zealand) Scott McLaughlin W	Team Penske	Chevrolet	01:01.0002
Practice 1 results

=== Practice 2 ===
Top Practice Speeds
Pos	No.	Driver	Team	Engine	Lap Time
1	28	(Sweden) Marcus Ericsson W	Andretti Global	Honda	01:00.5151
2	18	(Netherlands) Rinus VeeKay	Dale Coyne Racing	Honda	01:00.6081
3	10	(Spain) Álex Palou	Chip Ganassi Racing	Honda	01:00.6406
Practice 2 results

== Qualifying ==
Qualifying was held at 2:30 PM ET on March 1, 2025.

=== Qualifying classification ===
Pos	No.	Driver	Team	Engine	Time	Final grid							
Pos	No.	Driver	Team	Engine	Time	Final grid	1	3	(New Zealand) Scott McLaughlin W	Team Penske	Chevrolet	**59.4624**	1
Pos	No.	Driver	Team	Engine	2	Final grid	26	(United States) Colton Herta W	Andretti Global with Curb-Agajanian	Honda	59.6393	2	
3	60	(Sweden) Felix Rosenqvist	Meyer Shank Racing	Honda	59.6989	3							
4	66	(New Zealand) Marcus Armstrong	Meyer Shank Racing	Honda	59.8278	4							
5	7	(Denmark) Christian Lundgaard	Arrow McLaren	Chevrolet	59.8663	5							
6	9	(New Zealand) Scott Dixon	Chip Ganassi Racing	Honda	59.9216	6							
7	28	(Sweden) Marcus Ericsson W	Andretti Global	Honda	01:00.0034	7							
8	10	(Spain) Álex Palou	Chip Ganassi Racing	Honda	01:00.0363	8							
9	27	(United States) Kyle Kirkwood	Andretti Global	Honda	01:00.0491	9							
10	2	(United States) Josef Newgarden W	Team Penske	Chevrolet	01:00.1424	10							
11	6	(United States) Nolan Siegel R	Arrow McLaren	Chevrolet	01:00.2257	11							
12	18	(Netherlands) Rinus VeeKay	Dale Coyne Racing	Honda	01:00.3086	12							
13	12	(Australia) Will Power W	Team Penske	Chevrolet	59.8752	13							
14	30	(Canada) Devlin DeFrancesco	Rahal Letterman Lanigan Racing	Honda	01:00.1019	14							
15	8	(Cayman Islands) Kyffin Simpson	Chip Ganassi Racing	Honda	01:00.0095	15							
16	45	(United Kingdom) Louis Foster R	Rahal Letterman Lanigan Racing	Honda	01:00.2365	16							
17	4	(United States) David Malukas	A. J. Foyt Racing	Chevrolet	01:00.0128	17							
18	83	(Israel) Robert Shwartzman R	Prema Racing	Chevrolet	01:00.4609	18							
19	14	(United States) Santino Ferrucci	A. J. Foyt Racing	Chevrolet	01:00.0141	19							
20	20	(United States) Alexander Rossi W	ECR	Chevrolet	01:00.4871	20							
21	15	(United States) Graham Rahal W	Rahal Letterman Lanigan Racing	Honda	01:00.0513	21							
22	76	(United States) Conor Daly	Juncos Hollinger Racing	Chevrolet	01:00.5856	22							
23	5	(Mexico) Pato O'Ward W	Arrow McLaren	Chevrolet	01:00.3671	23							
24	21	(Denmark) Christian Rasmussen	ECR	Chevrolet	01:00.6207	24							
25	51	(United States) Jacob Abel R	Dale Coyne Racing	Honda	01:00.8076	25							
26	77	(United States) Sting Ray Robb	Juncos Hollinger Racing	Chevrolet	01:00.7986	26							
27	90	(United Kingdom) Callum Ilott	Prema Racing	Chevrolet	01:00.8349	27							
Qualifying results

Notes

- **Bold text** indicates fastest time.

== Warmup ==
Top Practice Speeds
Pos	No.	Driver	Team	Engine	Lap Time
1	2	(United States) Josef Newgarden W	Team Penske	Chevrolet	01:01.1952
2	9	(New Zealand) Scott Dixon	Chip Ganassi Racing	Honda	01:01.5426
3	10	(Spain) Álex Palou	Chip Ganassi Racing	Honda	01:01.7536
Warmup results

== Race ==
The race was held at 12:00 PM ET on March 2, 2025.

=== Race classification ===
Pos	No.	Driver	Team	Engine	Laps	Time/Retired	Pit Stops	Grid	Laps Led	Pts.
1	10	(Spain) Álex Palou	Chip Ganassi Racing	Honda	100	01:51:08.5118	3	8	26	51
2	9	(New Zealand) Scott Dixon	Chip Ganassi Racing	Honda	100	01:51:11.3787	3	6	5	41
3	2	(United States) Josef Newgarden W	Team Penske	Chevrolet	100	01:51:14.7162	3	10	2	36
4	3	(New Zealand) Scott McLaughlin W	Team Penske	Chevrolet	100	01:51:17.1996	3	1	40	36
5	27	(United States) Kyle Kirkwood	Andretti Global	Honda	100	01:51:19.4872	3	9	-	30
6	28	(Sweden) Marcus Ericsson W	Andretti Global	Honda	100	01:51:31.5953	3	7	-	28
7	60	(Sweden) Felix Rosenqvist	Meyer Shank Racing	Honda	100	01:51:32.8013	3	3	-	26
8	7	(Denmark) Christian Lundgaard	Arrow McLaren	Chevrolet	100	01:51:40.7163	3	5	23	25
9	18	(Netherlands) Rinus VeeKay	Dale Coyne Racing	Honda	100	01:51:47.4561	3	12	-	22
10	20	(United States) Alexander Rossi W	ECR	Chevrolet	100	01:51:50.8503	3	20	-	20
11	5	(Mexico) Pato O'Ward W	Arrow McLaren	Chevrolet	100	01:51:51.2411	4	23	-	19
12	15	(United States) Graham Rahal W	Rahal Letterman Lanigan Racing	Honda	100	01:51:57.0110	3	21	-	18
13	4	(United States) David Malukas	A. J. Foyt Racing	Chevrolet	100	01:51:57.6618	3	17	-	17
14	14	(United States) Santino Ferrucci	A. J. Foyt Racing	Chevrolet	100	01:51:58.0334	3	19	-	16
15	21	(Denmark) Christian Rasmussen	ECR	Chevrolet	100	01:52:00.8953	3	24	-	15
16	26	(United States) Colton Herta W	Andretti Global with Curb-Agajanian	Honda	100	01:52:01.2166	3	2	1	15
17	76	(United States) Conor Daly	Juncos Hollinger Racing	Chevrolet	100	01:52:08.1442	3	22	-	13
18	8	(Cayman Islands) Kyffin Simpson	Chip Ganassi Racing	Honda	100	01:52:08.6819	3	15	-	12
19	90	(United Kingdom) Callum Ilott	Prema Racing	Chevrolet	100	01:52:09.7427	3	27	-	11
20	83	(Israel) Robert Shwartzman R	Prema Racing	Chevrolet	100	01:52:10.8872	3	18	-	10
21	77	(United States) Sting Ray Robb	Juncos Hollinger Racing	Chevrolet	99	01:51:18.9181	3	26	-	9
22	30	(Canada) Devlin DeFrancesco	Rahal Letterman Lanigan Racing	Honda	99	01:51:36.6424	4	14	-	8
23	51	(United States) Jacob Abel R	Dale Coyne Racing	Honda	99	01:52:05.2339	3	25	-	7
24	66	(New Zealand) Marcus Armstrong	Meyer Shank Racing	Honda	46	Accident	2	4	3	7
25	6	(United States) Nolan Siegel R	Arrow McLaren	Chevrolet	0	Accident	0	11	-	5
26	12	(Australia) Will Power W	Team Penske	Chevrolet	0	Accident	0	13	-	5
27	45	(United Kingdom) Louis Foster R	Rahal Letterman Lanigan Racing	Honda	0	Accident	0	16	-	5
Fastest lap: (United States) Josef Newgarden (Team Penske) - 1:01.6900 (Lap 89)
Race Results

== Championship standings after the race ==
Drivers' Championship standings

	Pos.	Driver	Points
Unchanged	1	(Spain) Álex Palou	51
Unchanged	2	(New Zealand) Scott Dixon	41 (–10)
Unchanged	3	(United States) Josef Newgarden	36 (–15)
Unchanged	4	(New Zealand) Scott McLaughlin	36 (–15)
Unchanged	5	(United States) Kyle Kirkwood	30 (–21)

Engine manufacturer standings

	Pos.	Manufacturer	Points
Unchanged	1	Honda	90
Unchanged	2	Chevrolet	67 (–23)

- Note: Only the top five positions are included.

Previous race: 2024 Big Machine Music City Grand Prix	IndyCar Series; 2025 season	Next race: 2025 Thermal Club IndyCar Grand Prix
Previous race: 2024 Firestone Grand Prix of St. Petersburg	Firestone Grand Prix of St. Petersburg	Next race: 2026 Firestone Grand Prix of St. Petersburg
