= 2024 Firestone Grand Prix of St. Petersburg =

Indycar race held in St. Petersburg, Florida

(United States) 2024 Firestone Grand Prix of St. Petersburg
Race details
1st round of the 2024 IndyCar season
Next race →
- Layout of the Firestone Grand Prix of St. Petersburg
- Date: March 10, 2024
- Official name: Firestone Grand Prix of St. Petersburg
- Location: Streets of St. Petersburg, St. Petersburg, Florida
- Course: Temporary street circuit 1.800 mi / 2.897 km
- Distance: 100 laps 180.000 mi / 289.682 km

Pole position
- Driver: (United States) Josef Newgarden (Team Penske)
- Time: 59.5714

Fastest lap
- Driver: (Cayman Islands) Kyffin Simpson (Chip Ganassi Racing)
- Time: 1:00.8779 (on lap 88 of 100)

Podium
- First: (Mexico) Pato O'Ward (Arrow McLaren)
- Second: (Australia) Will Power (Team Penske)
- Third: (United States) Colton Herta (Andretti Global)

Chronology
Previous	Next
2023	2025

The 2024 Firestone Grand Prix of St. Petersburg was the first round of the 2024 IndyCar season. The race was held on March 10, 2024, in St. Petersburg, Florida at the Streets of St. Petersburg. The race consisted of 100 laps and was won by Pato O'Ward, making it his first victory on this event, after the original winner Josef Newgarden was disqualified two months following the race for push-to-pass violations.

== Entry list ==
Key	Meaning
R	Rookie
W	Past winner

No.	Driver	Team	Engine
2	(United States) Josef Newgarden W	Team Penske	Chevrolet
3	(New Zealand) Scott McLaughlin W	Team Penske	Chevrolet
4	(Cayman Islands) Kyffin Simpson R	Chip Ganassi Racing	Honda
5	(Mexico) Pato O'Ward	Arrow McLaren	Chevrolet
6	(United Kingdom) Callum Ilott	Arrow McLaren	Chevrolet
7	(United States) Alexander Rossi	Arrow McLaren	Chevrolet
8	(Sweden) Linus Lundqvist R	Chip Ganassi Racing	Honda
9	(New Zealand) Scott Dixon	Chip Ganassi Racing	Honda
10	(Spain) Álex Palou	Chip Ganassi Racing	Honda
11	(New Zealand) Marcus Armstrong	Chip Ganassi Racing	Honda
12	(Australia) Will Power W	Team Penske	Chevrolet
14	(United States) Santino Ferrucci	A. J. Foyt Enterprises	Chevrolet
15	(United States) Graham Rahal W	Rahal Letterman Lanigan Racing	Honda
18	(United Kingdom) Jack Harvey	Dale Coyne Racing	Honda
20	(Denmark) Christian Rasmussen R	Ed Carpenter Racing	Chevrolet
21	(Netherlands) Rinus VeeKay	Ed Carpenter Racing	Chevrolet
26	(United States) Colton Herta W	Andretti Global with Curb-Agajanian	Honda
27	(United States) Kyle Kirkwood	Andretti Global	Honda
28	(Sweden) Marcus Ericsson W	Andretti Global	Honda
30	(Brazil) Pietro Fittipaldi	Rahal Letterman Lanigan Racing	Honda
41	(United States) Sting Ray Robb	A. J. Foyt Enterprises	Chevrolet
45	(Denmark) Christian Lundgaard	Rahal Letterman Lanigan Racing	Honda
51	(United States) Colin Braun R	Dale Coyne Racing with Rick Ware Racing	Honda
60	(Sweden) Felix Rosenqvist	Meyer Shank Racing	Honda
66	(United Kingdom) Tom Blomqvist R	Meyer Shank Racing	Honda
77	(France) Romain Grosjean	Juncos Hollinger Racing	Chevrolet
78	(Argentina) Agustín Canapino	Juncos Hollinger Racing	Chevrolet

== Practice ==
=== Practice 1 ===
Top Practice Speeds
Pos	No.	Driver	Team	Engine	Lap Time
1	60	(Sweden) Felix Rosenqvist	Meyer Shank Racing	Honda	1:00.3390
2	5	(Mexico) Pato O'Ward	Arrow McLaren	Chevrolet	1:00.8112
3	11	(New Zealand) Marcus Armstrong	Chip Ganassi Racing	Honda	1:00.8182

=== Practice 2 ===
Top Practice Speeds
Pos	No.	Driver	Team	Engine	Lap Time
1	26	(United States) Colton Herta	Andretti Global	Honda	1:00.1331
2	2	(United States) Josef Newgarden	Team Penske	Chevrolet	1:00.3872
3	12	(Australia) Will Power	Team Penske	Chevrolet	1:00.4101

== Qualifying ==
Qualifying was held at 2:00 PM ET on March 9, 2024.

=== Qualifying classification ===
Pos	No.	Driver	Team	Engine	Time				Final grid
Pos	No.	Driver	Team	Engine	Round 1		Round 2	Round 3	Final grid
Pos	No.	Driver	Team	Engine	Group 1	Group 2	Round 2	Round 3	Final grid
1	2	(United States) Josef Newgarden **W**	Team Penske	Chevrolet	59.5699	N/A	59.3214	59.5714	1
2	60	(Sweden) Felix Rosenqvist	Meyer Shank Racing	Honda	N/A	59.6220	59.2706	59.5772	2
3	5	(Mexico) Pato O'Ward	Arrow McLaren	Chevrolet	59.5507	N/A	59.5382	59.6540	3
4	26	(United States) Colton Herta **W**	Andretti Global	Honda	N/A	59.5596	59.3157	59.8189	4
5	77	(France) Romain Grosjean	Juncos Hollinger Racing	Chevrolet	N/A	59.5709	59.5074	1:00.0642	5
6	28	(Sweden) Marcus Ericsson **W**	Andretti Global	Honda	59.3703	N/A	59.4484	1:03.5583	6
7	21	(Netherlands) Rinus VeeKay	Ed Carpenter Racing	Chevrolet	59.5805	N/A	59.5501	N/A	7
8	12	(Australia) Will Power **W**	Team Penske	Chevrolet	N/A	59.6888	59.5594	N/A	8
9	3	(New Zealand) Scott McLaughlin **W**	Team Penske	Chevrolet	59.6202	N/A	59.5741	N/A	9
10	11	(New Zealand) Marcus Armstrong	Chip Ganassi Racing	Honda	59.5263	N/A	59.6127	N/A	10
11	9	(New Zealand) Scott Dixon	Chip Ganassi Racing	Honda	N/A	59.7200	59.8483	N/A	11
12	45	(Denmark) Christian Lundgaard	Rahal Letterman Lanigan Racing	Honda	N/A	59.7940	1:00.0172	N/A	12
13	10	(Spain) Álex Palou	Chip Ganassi Racing	Honda	59.7897	N/A	N/A	N/A	13
14	14	(United States) Santino Ferrucci	A. J. Foyt Racing	Chevrolet	N/A	59.8182	N/A	N/A	14
15	7	(United States) Alexander Rossi	Arrow McLaren	Chevrolet	59.8164	N/A	N/A	N/A	15
16	6	(United Kingdom) Callum Ilott	Arrow McLaren	Chevrolet	N/A	59.8911	N/A	N/A	16
17	66	(United Kingdom) Tom Blomqvist **R**	Meyer Shank Racing	Honda	59.9968	N/A	N/A	N/A	17
18	27	(United States) Kyle Kirkwood	Andretti Global	Honda	N/A	59.9102	N/A	N/A	18
19	8	(Sweden) Linus Lundqvist **R**	Chip Ganassi Racing	Honda	1:00.0034	N/A	N/A	N/A	19
20	78	(Argentina) Agustín Canapino	Juncos Hollinger Racing	Chevrolet	N/A	59.9308	N/A	N/A	20
21	20	(Denmark) Christian Rasmussen **R**	Ed Carpenter Racing	Chevrolet	1:00.2021	N/A	N/A	N/A	21
22	15	(United States) Graham Rahal **W**	Rahal Letterman Lanigan Racing	Honda	N/A	1:00.0953	N/A	N/A	22
23	4	(Cayman Islands) Kyffin Simpson **R**	Chip Ganassi Racing	Honda	1:00.2956	N/A	N/A	N/A	23
24	41	(United States) Sting Ray Robb	A. J. Foyt Racing	Chevrolet	N/A	1:00.4125	N/A	N/A	24
25	51	(United States) Colin Braun **R**	Dale Coyne Racing w/ Rick Ware Racing	Honda	1:01.3044	N/A	N/A	N/A	25
26	30	(Brazil) Pietro Fittipaldi	Rahal Letterman Lanigan Racing	Honda	N/A	1:00.5336	N/A	N/A	26
27	18	(United Kingdom) Jack Harvey	Dale Coyne Racing	Honda	N/A	1:00.5712	N/A	N/A	27

Notes

- **Bold text** indicates fastest time set in session.

== Warmup ==
Top Practice Speeds
Pos	No.	Driver	Team	Engine	Lap Time
1	26	(United States) Colton Herta	Andretti Global	Honda	59.9267
2	9	(New Zealand) Scott Dixon	Chip Ganassi Racing	Honda	59.9734
3	10	(Spain) Álex Palou	Chip Ganassi Racing	Honda	1:00.0292

== Race ==
The race was held at 12:15 PM ET on March 10, 2024.

=== Race classification ===
Pos	No.	Driver	Team	Engine	Laps	Time/Retired	Pit Stops	Grid	Laps Led	Pts.
1	5	(Mexico) Pato O'Ward	Arrow McLaren	Chevrolet	100	1:51:37.5075	2	3	0	50
2	12	(Australia) Will Power W	Team Penske	Chevrolet	100	+1.1438	2	8	0	30^{1}
3	26	(United States) Colton Herta W	Andretti Global	Honda	100	+2.3457	2	4	1	36
4	10	(Spain) Álex Palou	Chip Ganassi Racing	Honda	100	+3.8915	2	13	0	32
5	60	(Sweden) Felix Rosenqvist	Meyer Shank Racing	Honda	100	+6.4923	2	2	0	31
6	7	(United States) Alexander Rossi	Arrow McLaren	Chevrolet	100	+7.8732	2	15	0	28
7	9	(New Zealand) Scott Dixon	Chip Ganassi Racing	Honda	100	+8.3843	2	11	0	26
8	21	(Netherlands) Rinus VeeKay	Ed Carpenter Racing	Chevrolet	100	+10.9225	2	7	0	24
9	14	(United States) Santino Ferrucci	A. J. Foyt Racing	Chevrolet	100	+15.1316	2	14	0	22
10	27	(United States) Kyle Kirkwood	Andretti Global	Honda	100	+16.6755	2	18	0	20
11	6	(United Kingdom) Callum Ilott	Arrow McLaren	Chevrolet	100	+20.7992	2	16	0	19
12	4	(Cayman Islands) Kyffin Simpson R	Chip Ganassi Racing	Honda	100	+21.6541	2	23	0	18
13	30	(Brazil) Pietro Fittipaldi	Rahal Letterman Lanigan Racing	Honda	100	+24.9054	2	26	0	17
14	15	(United States) Graham Rahal W	Rahal Letterman Lanigan Racing	Honda	100	+26.7834	3	22	0	16
15	66	(United Kingdom) Tom Blomqvist R	Meyer Shank Racing	Honda	100	+32.5605	2	17	0	15
16	78	(Argentina) Agustín Canapino	Juncos Hollinger Racing	Chevrolet	100	+34.2126	2	20	0	14
17	18	(United Kingdom) Jack Harvey	Dale Coyne Racing	Honda	100	+41.4332	2	27	0	13
18	45	(Denmark) Christian Lundgaard	Rahal Letterman Lanigan Racing	Honda	100	+50.8226	3	12	7	13
19	20	(Denmark) Christian Rasmussen R	Ed Carpenter Racing	Chevrolet	99	+1 Lap	2	21	0	11
20	51	(United States) Colin Braun R	Dale Coyne Racing w/ Rick Ware Racing	Honda	99	+1 Lap	2	25	0	10
21	8	(Sweden) Linus Lundqvist R	Chip Ganassi Racing	Honda	97	+3 Laps	2	19	0	9
22	77	(France) Romain Grosjean	Juncos Hollinger Racing	Chevrolet	82	Mechanical	2	5	0	8
23	28	(Sweden) Marcus Ericsson W	Andretti Global	Honda	52	Mechanical	1	6	0	7
24	41	(United States) Sting Ray Robb	A. J. Foyt Racing	Chevrolet	33	Off Course	1	24	0	6
25	11	(New Zealand) Marcus Armstrong	Chip Ganassi Racing	Honda	25	Contact	0	10	0	5
26	2	(United States) Josef Newgarden W	Team Penske	Chevrolet	100	Disqualified^{2}	–	1	–	1
27	3	(New Zealand) Scott McLaughlin W	Team Penske	Chevrolet	100	Disqualified^{2}	–	9	–	0
Fastest lap: (Cayman Islands) Kyffin Simpson (Chip Ganassi Racing) – 1:00.8779 (lap 88)

==== Notes ====
- ^1 – Power was given a 10-point penalty due to a Push to Pass violation.
- ^2 – Newgarden and McLaughlin were disqualified for Push to Pass violations.

== Championship standings after the race ==
Drivers' Championship standings

	Pos.	Driver	Points
Unchanged	1	(Mexico) Pato O'Ward	50
Unchanged	2	(United States) Colton Herta	36 (-14)
Unchanged	3	(Spain) Alex Palou	32 (-16)
Unchanged	4	(Sweden) Felix Rosenqvist	31 (-17)
Unchanged	5	(Australia) Will Power	30 (-18)

Engine manufacturer standings

	Pos.	Manufacturer	Points
Unchanged	1	Honda	267
Unchanged	2	Chevrolet	213

- Note: Only the top five positions are included.

Previous race: 2023 Firestone Grand Prix of Monterey	IndyCar Series; 2024 season	Next race: 2024 $1 Million Challenge (Exhibition); 2024 Acura Grand Prix of Long Beach
Previous race: 2023 Firestone Grand Prix of St. Petersburg	Firestone Grand Prix of St. Petersburg	Next race: 2025 Firestone Grand Prix of St. Petersburg
