= The Thermal Club IndyCar Grand Prix =

Auto race held in Thermal, California, United States

IndyCar Series
- Location: Thermal Club, Thermal, California, U.S. 33°36′05″N 116°09′16″W
- First race: 2024
- Last race: 2025
- Distance: 199.36 mi (320.84 km)
- Laps: 65

Circuit information
- Surface: Asphalt
- Length: 4.936 km (3.067 mi)
- Turns: 17

The NTT IndyCar Series raced on the permanent road course at the Thermal Club in Thermal, California in 2024 and 2025.

In 2024, a non-championship exhibition event called the $1 Million Challenge was held. It was designed to be a "made-for-TV" all-star event and was won by Alex Palou.

For the 2025 season, the race became a full championship points race and was called the Thermal Club IndyCar Grand Prix.

== Background ==
Championship car races have been held in Riverside County since 1967, when the Rex Mays 300 was held under United States Auto Club sanction from 1967-69 at Riverside International Raceway, located in Moreno Valley, California of the Edgemont community, 72 miles (116 km) northwest of The Thermal Club. After the closure of Ontario Motor Speedway in 1980, Championship Auto Racing Teams moved the Ontario race to Riverside, where it was run as a 500 kilometer race from 1981 to 1983.

Over a decade before the first racing event, Thermal Club owner Tim Rogers hosted Randy Bernard, then the chief executive officer at Indy Racing League, LLC (then under Hulman & Co. ownership) at a ribbon cutting ceremony, and told The Indianapolis Star he had always wanted to host a race at the property. Talks ramped up during the 2022 season about the club hosting IndyCar's preseason test in 2023, with the series in need of a consistent, warm-weather location for such testing. During the test, Marcus Armstrong praised the circuit and expressed a desire to have a race there, but some other drivers including Colton Herta and Callum Ilott expressed concerns regarding overtaking and the safety of using Armco barriers.

Following this test, in September 2023, IndyCar announced that 2024's test would be concluded by the $1 Million Challenge non-points race.

In October 2023, a limited number of two thousand tickets were made available at $2000 each. In January 2024, IndyCar offered $500 tickets to the first one hundred IndyCar Nation members that claimed them. On March 5, 2024, the Thermal Club cut all ticket prices to $500 and issued partial refunds to those who had purchased at the earlier price. The reason given was that the country club had given permission to allow more people into the facility.

On June 13, 2024, with the announcement of the 2025 schedule as part of the new Fox Sports media deal, the race was promoted to a full points-paying race. It was scheduled for March 21–23, 2025, with practice and qualifying on FS1, and the race broadcast on Fox network. The club-grade pit lane, which forced IndyCar to run a non-championship format with no live pit stops in 2024, was expanded to meet or exceed IndyCar's minimum 35 feet (11 m) pit box standard and carried a minimum of 30 cars.

In June 2025, Rogers confirmed that the race would not return for the 2026 season.

== Racecourse ==
The racecourse is a permanent road course with a length of 4.936 km (3.067 miles) and features 17 turns. The course is part of a 300-plus-acre private country club located in a gated community in the Coachella Valley.

A March 2025 report on racer.com described the track's surface as "torturous" on tires, calling it "the Coachella Valley cheese grater".

== Past winners ==
=== IndyCar Series ===
Season	Date	Driver	Team	Chassis	Engine	Tires	Race distance		Race time	Average speed (mph)	Report	Ref
Season	Date	Driver	Team	Chassis	Engine	Tires	Laps	Miles (km)	Race time	Average speed (mph)	Report	Ref
2024	March 24	(Spain) Álex Palou	Chip Ganassi Racing	Dallara	Honda	Firestone	20	61.34 (98.72)	00:39:30	93.166	Report	
2025	March 23	(Spain) Álex Palou	Chip Ganassi Racing	Dallara	Honda	Firestone	65	199.36 (320.84)	01:56:23	102.771	Report	

== See also ==
- Marlboro Challenge
- 2008 Nikon Indy 300
