= Thermal Club =

Private automotive club

The Thermal Club
- Twin Palms Circuit (2017–present)
- Location: Thermal, California
- Coordinates: 33°36′7″N 116°9′46″W
- FIA Grade: 2 (Twin Palms Circuit)
- Owner: Tim Rogers & John Rogers
- Opened: 2012; 14 years ago
- Architect: Alan Wilson
- Major events: Current: Ferrari Challenge North America (2026); Former: IndyCar Series; The Thermal Club IndyCar Grand Prix (2024–2025)
- Website: https://www.thermal.cc/

GT Circuit (2017–present)
- Surface: Asphalt
- Length: 5.100 mi (8.208 km)
- Turns: 26

Twin Palms Circuit (2015–present)
- Surface: Asphalt
- Length: 3.067 mi (4.936 km)
- Turns: 17
- Race lap record: 1:39.8051 ( (Spain) Álex Palou, Dallara IR-18, 2024, IndyCar)

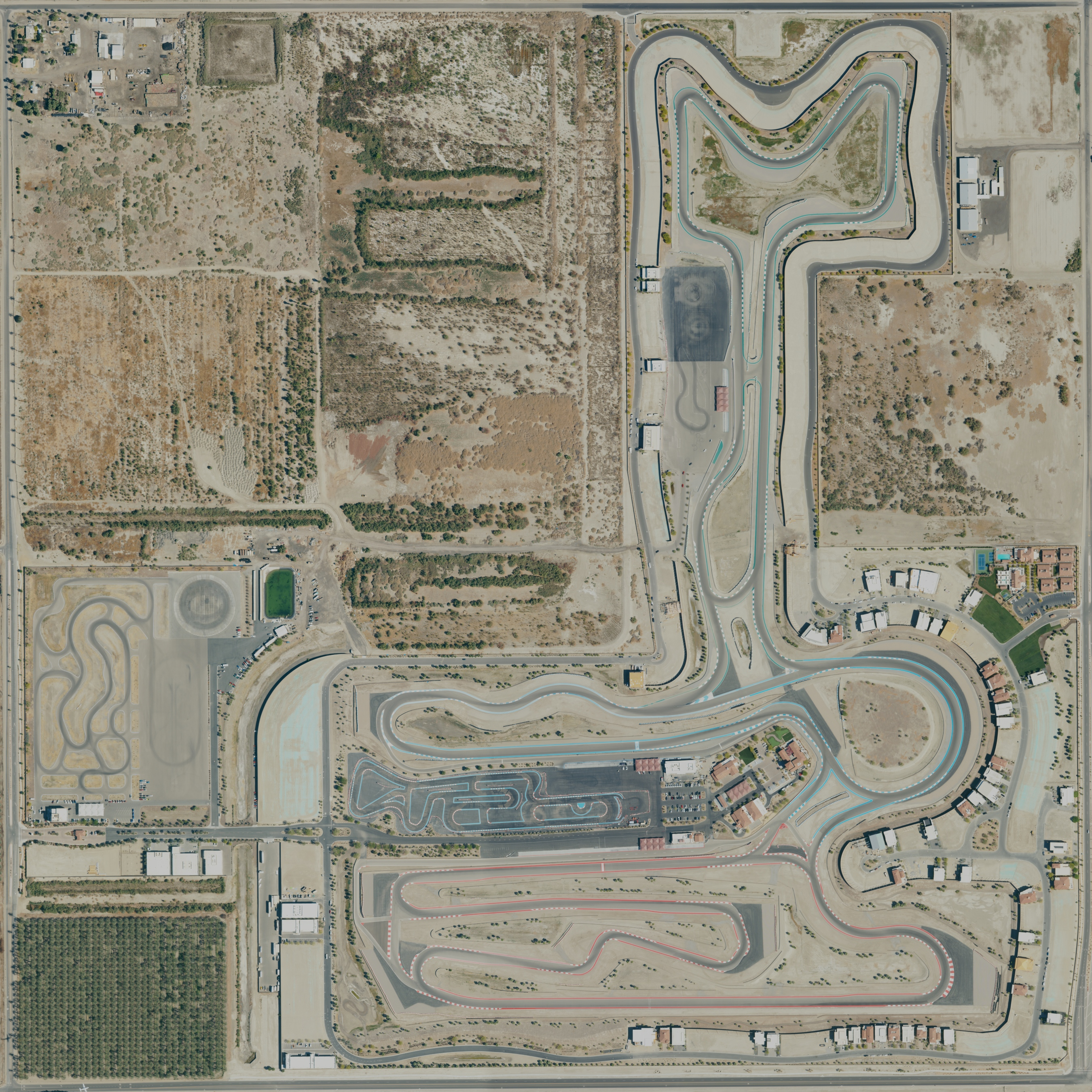
Aerial photo in 2022

The Thermal Club is a country club and motorsports circuit in Thermal, California. The venue was opened in 2012. It hosted a non-championship IndyCar event in 2024, the $1 Million Challenge, and a points-paying event in 2025, the Thermal Club IndyCar Grand Prix.

Thermal has three separate road courses that can be combined in up to 20 configurations, up to the 5.100 mi (8.208 km) GT circuit. Members must purchase an on-site villa which each have large private garages. Members also have access to a full-service tuning shop and other non-automotive amenities.

In 2017, BMW completed construction of their BMW Performance Driving Center West, which is home to the BMW Performance Driving School.

== Lap records ==
As of March 2026, the fastest official race lap records at Thermal Club are listed as:

Category	Time	Driver	Vehicle	Event
Twin Palms Circuit (2015–present): 3.067 mi (4.936 km)
IndyCar	1:39.8051	Álex Palou	Dallara IR-18	2024 $1 Million Challenge
Ferrari Challenge	2:00.428	Johnny Kaminskey	Ferrari 296 Challenge	2026 Thermal Club Ferrari Challenge North America round

== See also ==
- Monticello Motor Club
- MotorSport Ranch
