= Thermal, California =

Resort community in Riverside County, Southern California, United States

Thermal, California Kokell
- Unincorporated community Census-designated place
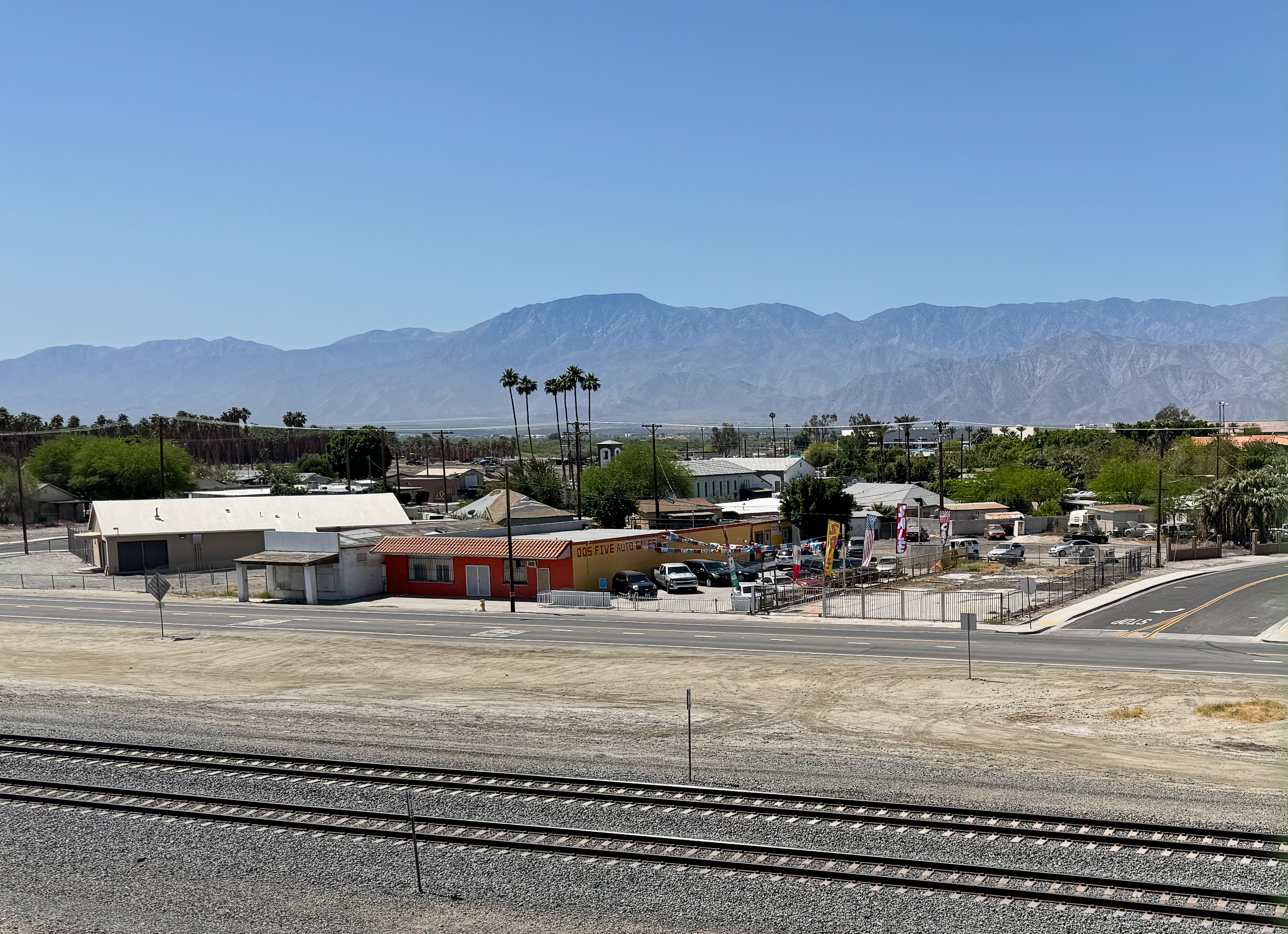
- Thermal with the Santa Rosa Mountains in the Background

- Location within Riverside County

- Location within California Location within the United States
- Coordinates: 33°38′25″N 116°08′32″W
- Country: United States
- State: California
- County: Riverside

Area
  - Total: 9.383 sq mi (24.303 km^{2})
  - Land: 9.383 sq mi (24.303 km^{2})
  - Water: 0 sq mi (0.00 km^{2}) 0.00%
- Elevation: −141 ft (−43 m)

Population (2020)
  - Total: 2,676
  - Estimate (2021): 2,700
  - Density: 285.2/sq mi (110.1/km^{2})
- Time zone: UTC−8 (Pacific)
  - Summer (DST): UTC−7 (PDT)
- ZIP Codes: 92274
- Area codes: 442/760
- FIPS code: 06-55254
- GNIS feature IDs: 2583161

Thermal is an unincorporated community within the Coachella Valley in Riverside County, California, United States, located approximately 25 miles (40 km) southeast of Palm Springs and about 9.5 miles (15.3 km) north of the Salton Sea. The community's elevation is 138 feet (42 m) below mean sea level. It is served by area codes 760 and 442 and is in ZIP Code 92274. The population was 2,676 at the 2020 census. For statistical purposes, the United States Census Bureau has defined Thermal a census-designated place (CDP), which does not precisely correspond to the historical community.

== History ==
On December 30, 1823, Brevet Captain Jose Romero led a military expedition finding a route to Tucson from San Gabriel passes in the foothills west of Thermal and Martinez Indian Village (South of Thermal). Thermal (originally Kokell) began as a railroad camp in 1910 for employees of the Southern Pacific Railroad, followed by Mecca (originally called Walters) in 1915 and Arabia in between, each with about 1,000 residents. Permanent dwellings were soon established on Avenue 56 (renamed Airport Boulevard), former U.S. Route 99 (State Route 86) and State Route 111 by the 1930s.

Agricultural development from canal irrigation made the area thrive in greenery by the 1950s, followed by the former Camp Young U.S. Naval Air station converted into Thermal Airport by 1965. In the early 1990s, a four-lane highway (State Route 86) was constructed over an earlier transportation route. There is a proposal for a major commercial aviation Airport known as the Jackie Cochran-Desert Cities Regional Airport on the same site.

== Geography ==
According to the United States Census Bureau, the CDP covers an area of 9.5 square miles (25.5 km^{2}), all of its land.

=== Climate ===
Thermal has a desert climate (BWh according to the Köppen climate classification). High mountain ranges on three sides contribute to its unique and year-round warm climate, with some of the warmest winters west of the Rocky Mountains. Its average annual high temperature is 88.7 °F (31.5 °C) and its average annual low is 56.3 °F (13.5 °C). Summer highs above 110 °F (43 °C) occur on average 28 days per year and exceed 120 °F (49 °C) every other year. Summer nights often stay above 80 °F (27 °C). Winters are warm with daytime highs rarely below 60 °F (16 °C), although light freezes happen every year. The average annual precipitation is under 3 inches (76 mm), with over 348 days of sunshine per year. The hottest temperature ever recorded in the area was 126 °F (52 °C) on July 28, 1995, and the coldest is 14 °F (−10 °C) on December 23, 1990.

Climate data for Thermal, California (Desert Resorts Regional Airport, 1991–2020 normals, extremes 1950–present)
Month	Jan	Feb	Mar	Apr	May	Jun	Jul	Aug	Sep	Oct	Nov	Dec	Year
Record high °F (°C)	94 (34)	100 (38)	110 (43)	110 (43)	116 (47)	123 (51)	126 (52)	122 (50)	123 (51)	114 (46)	98 (37)	93 (34)	126 (52)
Mean maximum °F (°C)	82.8 (28.2)	86.4 (30.2)	94.1 (34.5)	101.9 (38.8)	106.8 (41.6)	114.4 (45.8)	116.9 (47.2)	116.0 (46.7)	112.3 (44.6)	103.4 (39.7)	91.5 (33.1)	80.8 (27.1)	119.0 (48.3)
Mean daily maximum °F (°C)	71.0 (21.7)	74.3 (23.5)	81.1 (27.3)	87.2 (30.7)	94.6 (34.8)	103.0 (39.4)	106.9 (41.6)	106.2 (41.2)	101.5 (38.6)	90.9 (32.7)	78.7 (25.9)	69.3 (20.7)	88.7 (31.5)
Daily mean °F (°C)	55.0 (12.8)	58.6 (14.8)	65.0 (18.3)	71.0 (21.7)	78.7 (25.9)	86.1 (30.1)	91.2 (32.9)	90.6 (32.6)	84.8 (29.3)	73.9 (23.3)	61.7 (16.5)	53.5 (11.9)	72.5 (22.5)
Mean daily minimum °F (°C)	39.0 (3.9)	42.9 (6.1)	49.0 (9.4)	54.8 (12.7)	62.9 (17.2)	69.1 (20.6)	75.6 (24.2)	74.9 (23.8)	68.2 (20.1)	56.9 (13.8)	44.7 (7.1)	37.7 (3.2)	56.3 (13.5)
Mean minimum °F (°C)	27.2 (−2.7)	30.5 (−0.8)	36.6 (2.6)	41.7 (5.4)	50.5 (10.3)	58.2 (14.6)	64.0 (17.8)	63.1 (17.3)	55.6 (13.1)	43.1 (6.2)	31.3 (−0.4)	25.0 (−3.9)	23.4 (−4.8)
Record low °F (°C)	17 (−8)	19 (−7)	24 (−4)	32 (0)	41 (5)	50 (10)	57 (14)	52 (11)	48 (9)	28 (−2)	20 (−7)	14 (−10)	14 (−10)
Average precipitation inches (mm)	0.64 (16)	0.61 (15)	0.34 (8.6)	0.08 (2.0)	0.01 (0.25)	0.01 (0.25)	0.13 (3.3)	0.12 (3.0)	0.32 (8.1)	0.19 (4.8)	0.17 (4.3)	0.34 (8.6)	2.96 (74.2)
Average precipitation days (≥ 0.01 in)	3.1	2.8	1.7	0.8	0.3	0.1	0.7	0.7	1.3	0.8	0.9	2.1	15.3
Source: NOAA

== Demographics ==
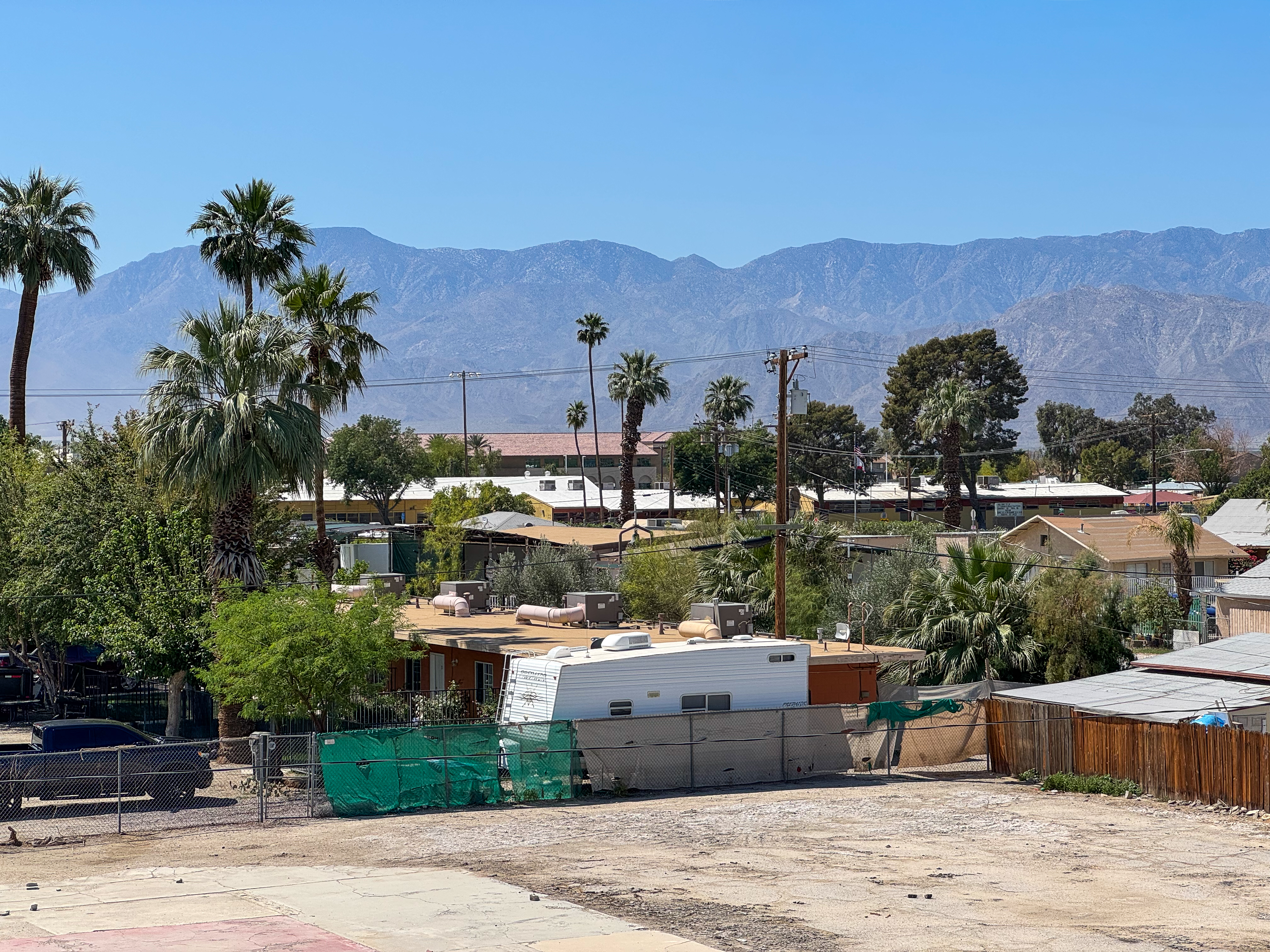
Thermal from Airport Road bridge

Historical population
Census	Pop.	Note	%±
2010	2,865		—
2020	2,676		−6.6%
U.S. Decennial Census; 1860–1870 1880-1890; 1900 1910 1920; 1930 1940 1950; 1960 1970 1980; 1990 2000 2010

Thermal first appeared as a census-designated place in the 2010 U.S. census.

=== Racial and ethnic composition ===
Thermal CDP, California – Racial and ethnic composition Note: the US Census treats Hispanic/Latino as an ethnic category. This table excludes Latinos from the racial categories and assigns them to a separate category. Hispanics/Latinos may be of any race.
Race / Ethnicity (NH = Non-Hispanic)	Pop 2010	Pop 2020	% 2010	% 2020
White alone (NH)	75	82	2.62%	3.06%
Black or African American alone (NH)	17	13	0.59%	0.49%
Native American or Alaska Native alone (NH)	11	2	0.38%	0.07%
Asian alone (NH)	23	23	0.80%	0.86%
Native Hawaiian or Pacific Islander alone (NH)	0	0	0.00%	0.00%
Other race alone (NH)	6	12	0.21%	0.45%
Mixed race or Multiracial (NH)	3	14	0.10%	0.52%
Hispanic or Latino (any race)	2,730	2,530	95.29%	94.54%
Total	2,865	2,676	100.00%	100.00%

=== 2020 census ===
As of the 2020 census, Thermal had a population of 2,676. The population density was 285.2 inhabitants per square mile (110.1/km^{2}). The median age was 29.6 years. The age distribution was 32.5% under the age of 18, 10.2% aged 18 to 24, 27.1% aged 25 to 44, 21.1% aged 45 to 64, and 9.0% who were 65 years of age or older. For every 100 females, there were 108.6 males, and for every 100 females age 18 and over there were 106.5 males age 18 and over.

Racial composition as of the 2020 census
Race	Number	Percent
White	405	15.1%
Black or African American	17	0.6%
American Indian and Alaska Native	43	1.6%
Asian	23	0.9%
Native Hawaiian and Other Pacific Islander	0	0.0%
Some other race	1,510	56.4%
Two or more races	678	25.3%

The census reported that 99.6% of the population lived in households, 0.4% lived in non-institutionalized group quarters, and no one was institutionalized. There were 664 households, out of which 56.0% included children under the age of 18, 54.8% were married-couple households, 7.2% were cohabiting couple households, 21.8% had a female householder with no spouse or partner present, and 16.1% had a male householder with no spouse or partner present. 13.6% of households were one person, and 6.0% were one person aged 65 or older. The average household size was 4.01. There were 554 families (83.4% of all households).

There were 719 housing units at an average density of 76.6 units per square mile (29.6 units/km^{2}), of which 664 (92.4%) were occupied. Of these, 48.8% were owner-occupied, and 51.2% were occupied by renters. 7.6% of housing units were vacant. The homeowner vacancy rate was 1.5% and the rental vacancy rate was 3.7%.

41.7% of residents lived in urban areas, while 58.3% lived in rural areas.

== Education ==
There are several schools in the Coachella Valley Unified School District that are in and near the community. These include schools in Salton City, 20 miles south of Coachella, in Imperial County, California. In Thermal, they are Westside Elementary (K-6), Oasis Elementary (K-8), Mountain Vista Elementary (K-6), Saul Martinez Elementary (K-6), Mecca Elementary (K-6), Edward Park Elementary (K-5), Toro Canyon Middle (6–8), Bobby Duke Middle (6–8), John Kelley Elementary (K-6), Coachella Valley High (9–12), Cesar Chavez Elementary (K-6), Cahuilla Desert Academy (Junior High: 7th and 8th grade), Desert Mirage High School (9–12), West Shores High School (9–12) and La Familia Continuation High (9–12).

College of the Desert, a community college based in Palm Desert has opened a new satellite campus, the East Valley Educational Center, on the corner of 62nd Avenue and Buchanan Street.

== Infrastructure ==
=== Transportation ===
Jacqueline Cochran Regional Airport (formerly Thermal Airport) is located about 1.6 miles southwest of the community. The Union Pacific Railroad owns and operates the former Southern Pacific Railroad mainline through Thermal.

The region is served by a two-lane expressway. California State Route 86 and California State Route 111 are modern transportation corridors that serve as a fruit shipping and international trucking route to connect with Interstate 10 in Indio.

=== Cemeteries ===
The Toro Cemetery is located on Monroe Street.

The Torres-Martinez Desert Cahuilla Indians maintain a small (48 interments) cemetery on Martinez Road.

== Sports ==
=== Thermal Club ===
The Thermal Club is a private motorsports facility situated on 344 acres (139 ha) south of Thermal. This private country club for automotive enthusiasts plans to build a 4.5-mile motor racing circuit (7,200 m) with 300 lots for member-owned garages and villas. As of 2014 the first 1.8-mile racing course (2,900 m) was in use by early members and for media and promotional events with two more courses planned. In 2017, BMW completed construction of their BMW Performance Driving Center West, which is home to the BMW Performance Driving School.

In March 2024 the club hosted the $1 Million Challenge, a special non-championship all-star race for the 2024 IndyCar Series. For the 2025 season, this race became a points-paying race.

=== Desert International Horse Park ===
The Desert International Horse Park is located west of Thermal. It is home to events sponsored by the United States Equestrian Federation, the United States Hunter/Jumper Association, and the Professional Rodeo Cowboys Association.

== Notable residents ==
- Ruby E. Modesto (Torres-Martinez Desert Cahuilla, 1913–1980), medicine woman, language instructor, and author
