= Barry Sheene Medal =

Award for best and fairest driver in a V8 Supercars season

- Sport: Touring car racing
- Competition: Supercars Championship
- Awarded for: "outstanding leadership, media interaction, character, personality, fan appeal and sportsmanship throughout the season"
- Location: Sydney, New South Wales, Australia

History
- First winner: Marcos Ambrose (2003)
- Most wins: Craig Lowndes (five)
- Most recent: Chaz Mostert (2024)

The Barry Sheene Medal is an annual award honouring the achievements of a driver in the Supercars Championship, an Australian touring car series. Tony Cochrane, the chairman of the championship's organising body Australian Vee Eight Supercar Company (AVESCO), (Note: AVESCO's name was changed to V8 Supercars Australia in 2005.) instigated the award in 2003. The medal is named after the two-time Grand Prix motorcycle world champion and motor racing television commentator Barry Sheene. It is presented to the driver adjudged to have displayed "outstanding leadership, media interaction, character, personality, fan appeal and sportsmanship throughout the season". A panel of motor racing journalists individually award three drivers scores of three, two and one points after every event of the season. The results are announced at the series' end-of-season gala in Sydney. (Note: The 2020 award ceremony took place at the Mount Panorama Circuit shortly after the 2020 Bathurst 1000 as a result of Australian COVID-19 protocols banning mass gatherings.)

Drivers consider it the second-most prestigious award after the drivers' championship, and it is frequently likened to Australian rules football's Brownlow Medal and rugby league's Dally M Medal. The inaugural recipient was the Stone Brothers Racing driver Marcos Ambrose in 2003. He won his first drivers' championship title that year. Ambrose claimed a second championship title the following year and earned a second medal win. Since then, four drivers have won the award more than once: Craig Lowndes, Jamie Whincup, Scott McLaughlin and David Reynolds. Australian drivers have earned the medal seventeen times and New Zealanders four times. Lowndes has the most victories of any competitor, collecting the award five times: in 2005, 2006, 2011, 2013 and 2015. Chaz Mostert was named the 2023 recipient, his first victory, and won it for a second time in 2024.

== Winners ==
Barry Sheene Medal winners
Year	Image	Winner	Nationality	Ref.
2003	A man in his early thirties wearing black rectangular sunglasses and racing overalls with sponsors logos. He is smiling at the camera	Marcos Ambrose	Australian	
2004	A man in his late thirties is wearing a black baseball cap and a black racing overall suit with sponsors logos.	Marcos Ambrose	Australian	
2005	A freckled face man in his early thirties is looking away from the camera and downwards	Craig Lowndes	Australian	
2006	A man in his early thirties is smiling and sitting inside a yellow tomcar and strapped inside by a seatbelt	Craig Lowndes	Australian	
2007	A man in his early twenties looking away from the camera and smiling widely	Jamie Whincup	Australian	
2008	An young aged man is wearing a yellow baseball cap with sponsors logo and a red and white racing overalls	Jamie Whincup	Australian	
2009	A man aged 30 at an autograph session. He is wearing a black, white and orange baseball cap, a blue and orange fleece and a watch on his left wrist	Will Davison	Australian	
2010	A man in his early twenties standing in a pit lane and smiling at the camera. He is holding a crash helmet in a yellow, dark green and white colour scheme in his right arm.	James Courtney	Australian	
2011	A man in his early thirties walking in a paddock. He is looking down from the camera and is wearing a grey T-shirt with sponsors logos.	Craig Lowndes	Australian	
2012	A man in his mid-30 smiling away from the camera. He is wearing a white fireproof vest with sponsors logos.	Mark Winterbottom	Australian	
2013	A middle-aged man wearing a dark grey baseball with sponsors logos and looking down and away from the camera.	Craig Lowndes	Australian	
2014	A teenaged man wearing red racing overalls with sponsors logos is smiling at the camera	Scott McLaughlin	New Zealander	
2015	A man in his early forties sporting a navy blue baseball cap with sponsors' logos and headphones to hear his team over the radio	Craig Lowndes	Australian	
2016	A man in his mid-twenties wearing a red zip T-shirt with a white colour scheme on the shoulders with sponsors logos and looking away from the camera with a smile	Scott McLaughlin	New Zealander	
2017	A man in his late twenties wearing a black and a similarly coloured T-shirt. He is looking slightly to the right of the camera.	David Reynolds	Australian	
2018	A man in his late twenties is looking down from the camera and signing autographs for others. He is wearing a black fleece with sponsors logos and a green T-shirt	David Reynolds	Australian	
2019	A man sporting a beard in his late twenties is wearing sunglasses and a dark blue baseball cap with a sponsor logo. His right hand is on his left arm.	Shane van Gisbergen	New Zealander	
2020	A man in his mid-twenties wearing a red zip T-shirt with a white colour scheme on the shoulders with sponsors logos and looking away from the camera with a smile	Scott McLaughlin	New Zealander	
2021		Jamie Whincup	Australian	
2022		Lee Holdsworth	Australian	
2023		Chaz Mostert	Australian	
2024		Chaz Mostert	Australian	
2025		Broc Feeney	Australian	

== Statistics ==
Multiple winners
Wins	Driver	Years
5	Craig Lowndes	2005, 2006, 2011, 2013, 2015
3	Scott McLaughlin	2014, 2016, 2020
3	Jamie Whincup	2007, 2008, 2021
2	Marcos Ambrose	2003, 2004
2	David Reynolds	2017, 2018
2	Chaz Mostert	2023, 2024

Winners by nationality
Country	Winners	Drivers
Australian	17	9
New Zealander	4	2

== See also ==
- Mike Kable Young Gun Award
- Peter Brock Medal
