= 2017 Townsville 400 =

2017 V8 Supercar championship race

(Queensland) 2017 Watpac Townsville 400
Event Information
- Round 7 of 14 in the 2017 International V8 Supercars Championship
- Date: 7–9 July 2017
- Location: Townsville, Queensland
- Venue: Townsville Street Circuit

Results
Race 1
Distance	70 laps	200 km
Pole position	(New Zealand) Scott McLaughlin; DJR Team Penske	1:12.0730
Winner	(New Zealand) Scott McLaughlin; DJR Team Penske	1:28:19.7418
Race 2
Distance	70 laps	200 km
Pole position	(New Zealand) Scott McLaughlin; DJR Team Penske	1:11.9907
Winner	(Australia) Jamie Whincup; Triple Eight Race Engineering	1:28:12.5243

The 2017 Watpac Townsville 400 was a motor racing event for the Supercars Championship, held on the weekend of 7 to 9 July 2017. The event was held at Townsville Street Circuit near Townsville, Queensland and consisted of two races, both 200 kilometres in length. It is the seventh event of fourteen in the 2017 Supercars Championship and hosted Races 13 and 14 of the season.

== Background ==
=== Driver changes ===
Aaren Russell was drafted in to replace Cameron McConville at Lucas Dumbrell Motorsport.
