= Scott McLaughlin =

New Zealand and American racing driver (born 1993)

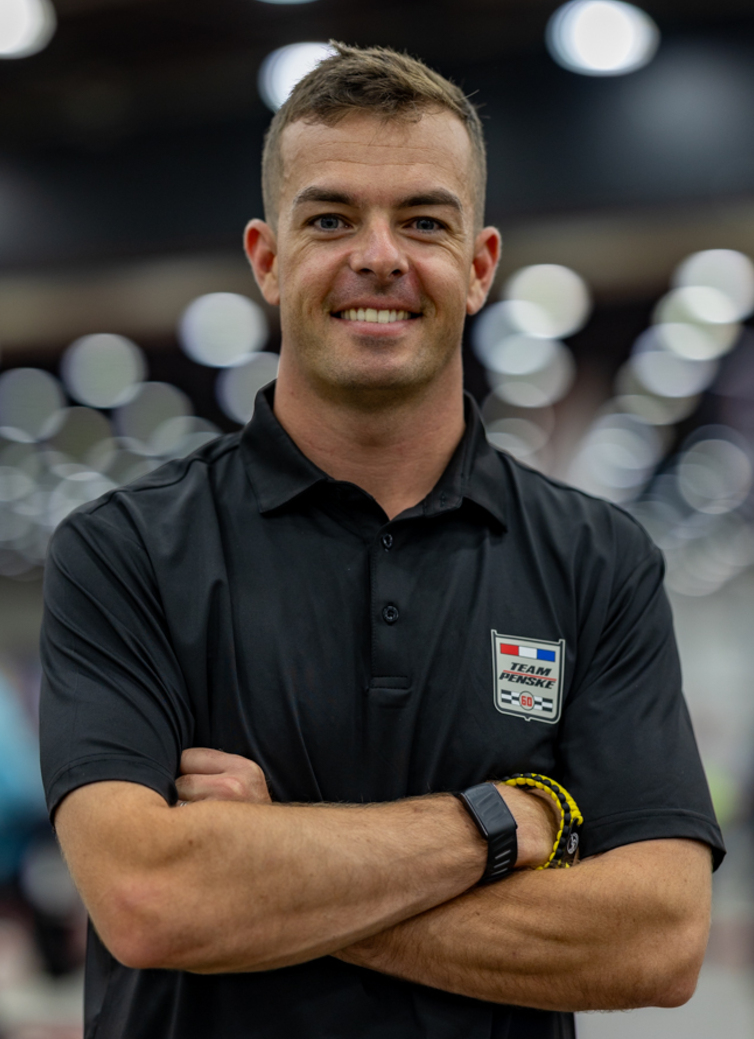
- McLaughlin in 2026
- Nationality: (New Zealand) New Zealander (United States) American (naturalised 2025)
- Born: Scott Thomas McLaughlin; 10 June 1993 (age 33) Christchurch, New Zealand
- Categorisation: FIA Gold (2016–2023); FIA Platinum (2024–)

IndyCar Series career
- 103 races run over 7 years
- Team: No. 3 (Team Penske)
- Best finish: 3rd (2023, 2024)
- First race: 2020 Grand Prix of St. Petersburg (St. Petersburg)
- Last race: 2026 Mission Grand Prix of Monterey (Laguna Seca)
- First win: 2022 Grand Prix of St. Petersburg (St. Petersburg)
- Last win: 2026 Mission Grand Prix of Monterey (Laguna Seca)
Wins	Podiums	Poles
8	26	13

Supercars Championship career
- Championships: 3 (2018, 2019, 2020)
- Races: 253
- Wins: 56
- Podiums: 106
- Pole positions: 76

Scott Thomas McLaughlin (/mɪˈklɒxlɪn/; born 10 June 1993) is a New Zealand racing driver who currently competes in the IndyCar Series, driving the No. 3 Dallara-Chevrolet for Team Penske. He previously raced in the Supercars Championship, in which he won the drivers' title in 2018, 2019 and 2020.

McLaughlin won the 2012 Dunlop V8 Supercar Series and made his Supercars Championship debut at the 2012 Dick Smith Sandown 500 as a co-driver to Jonathon Webb at Tekno Autosports. Having made a substitute appearance for Garry Rogers Motorsport at the final event of 2012, McLaughlin was signed by the team to compete full-time in the 2013 season. He took his first race victory in the sixth race of the year, becoming the youngest driver to win a Supercars Championship race, and went on to finish his rookie season in tenth place. McLaughlin remained with the team for the next three seasons and enjoyed continued success, recording seventeen pole positions and eight race victories for the team, with a best championship placing of third in 2016.

In July 2016, it was announced that McLaughlin would join DJR Team Penske for the 2017 Supercars Championship. He enjoyed immediate success with the team, taking a record sixteen pole positions during the season as well as eight race victories. McLaughlin finished runner-up to Jamie Whincup in the championship, with Whincup securing his seventh championship title in the final race of the season. The following season, McLaughlin took his maiden championship title after a close battle with Whincup's teammate Shane van Gisbergen in the second half of the year. In 2019, McLaughlin dominantly won his second championship, winning a record eighteen races during the season, including the Bathurst 1000, and securing the title with one event remaining. McLaughlin completed a hat-trick of championship wins in 2020, taking a further thirteen race victories.

During 2020, it was announced that McLaughlin would join the IndyCar Series with Team Penske in 2021. He made his debut at the 2020 Firestone Grand Prix of St. Petersburg.

== Early life ==
McLaughlin was born in Christchurch, New Zealand moving to Hamilton at the age of three with his family before moving to Australia's Gold Coast at nine years of age and attended Saint Stephen's College throughout his upbringing.

== Junior and early racing career ==
=== Karting ===
McLaughlin began racing karts in 1999 at the Kartsport Hamilton circuit outside of Hamilton, New Zealand, winning his first title in 2002. After his family relocated to the Gold Coast in 2003, McLaughlin began contesting Australian titles while also continuing to compete in New Zealand. In 2008, McLaughlin represented New Zealand in the Junior class at the Rotax Max Challenge Grand Finals, alongside Nick Cassidy. Starting the Final in sixth place, McLaughlin was involved in an incident on the first lap and eventually finished 19th.

=== V8 Supercar Development Series ===
McLaughlin was part of the Britek Motorsport scholarship in 2008, which saw him working closely with team owner and Supercars race winner Jason Bright. McLaughlin attended the 2008 Bathurst 1000 with the team, spending time in the pit garage and seeing the inner workings of the team. McLaughlin completed a week of work experience with Stone Brothers Racing (SBR) in 2009, after which he was offered a four-year apprenticeship with the team, starting in 2010. On 17 December 2009, the team gave McLaughlin his first test in a V8 Supercar. He recorded over seventy laps at Queensland Raceway, driving one of the team's Ford BF Falcons. McLaughlin impressed during the test, recording lap times just over one second slower than those of the SBR's full-time V8 Supercar drivers Alex Davison and Shane van Gisbergen.

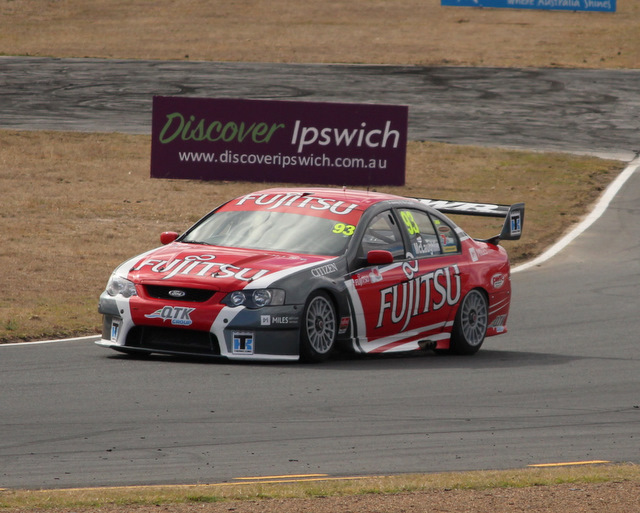
McLaughlin scored his first race win at Queensland Raceway in 2011, driving a Ford BF Falcon prepared by Stone Brothers Racing.

McLaughlin was signed by SBR to contest the 2010 Fujitsu V8 Supercar Series in a BF Falcon. Due to his limited racing experience in cars, McLaughlin was unable to attain the required competition licence to compete in the first round of the series; he instead took part in the first two rounds of the Australian Mini Challenge and completed a single round of the Victorian Formula Ford Series. He eventually made his debut in the second round at Queensland Raceway, becoming the youngest ever driver to race a V8 Supercar. McLaughlin qualified in seventh position, just under a second behind the pole position time of championship leader Steve Owen, and finished ninth in the first race of the weekend. The finishing order of the top ten was reversed to form the grid for Race 2, meaning that McLaughlin started the second race on the front row. He overheated the clutch during the start procedure and was unable to move his car when the race started. He was hit by Owen Kelly and Ryan Hansford, with the car suffering severe damage and taking McLaughlin out of the rest of the event. He went on to finish the season twelfth in the championship, with a best qualifying result of second at Sydney Olympic Park and a best race result of fourth at Winton Motor Raceway. McLaughlin suffered a heavy crash at Mount Panorama, hitting the wall at the Reid Park section of the circuit during the first race of the weekend.

McLaughlin remained with SBR in 2011 and scored his first podium in the opening round at Adelaide, finishing seventh and second in the two races to be classified third overall. He followed this up with a pair of third-place finishes at Barbagallo Raceway, moving up to second in the championship. After struggling in the third round at Townsville, McLaughlin secured his first race victory at Queensland Raceway. Having qualified second behind championship leader Andrew Thompson, McLaughlin took the lead at the start of the first race and went on to win by two seconds. Six further top-five race finishes in the remaining rounds of the season saw McLaughlin finish fourth in the championship, having updated to a newer FG Falcon at the penultimate round of the championship.

McLaughlin remained with SBR for the opening two rounds of the 2012 season before moving to Matt Stone Racing, a satellite team of SBR, for the remainder of the year. McLaughlin prevailed in a close title fight with Chaz Mostert, Scott Pye and Nick Percat; the quartet became known as the Dunlop Series' "Class of 2012", with all four drivers going on to become race winners in the Supercars Championship. McLaughlin scored his first round win in the series at Barbagallo Raceway, backing it up with another victory at Townsville. Another podium finish at Queensland Raceway gave McLaughlin an 88-point lead over Mostert with three rounds remaining. While on course to finish second in the first race at Mount Panorama, McLaughlin suffered a puncture which dropped him to thirteenth place. Despite recovering to finish sixth in the second race, McLaughlin left the event with a twenty-point deficit to Mostert in the championship. Percat and Pye finished first and second in the penultimate round at Winton, while McLaughlin finished fifth; the results saw McLaughlin take a 32-point lead over Percat into the final round at Sydney Olympic Park, with both Mostert and Pye less than one-hundred points adrift. McLaughlin won the opening race of the final round, with incidents for Percat and Mostert giving him a comfortable points lead heading into the final race of the season. A third-place finish saw him secure the title with a 73-point margin over Pye.

=== V8 SuperTourer Series ===
McLaughlin drove a Holden VE Commodore in the 2012 season of the V8 SuperTourer Series. He won six races for MPC Motorsport on his way to becoming the inaugural series champion.

== Supercars Championship ==
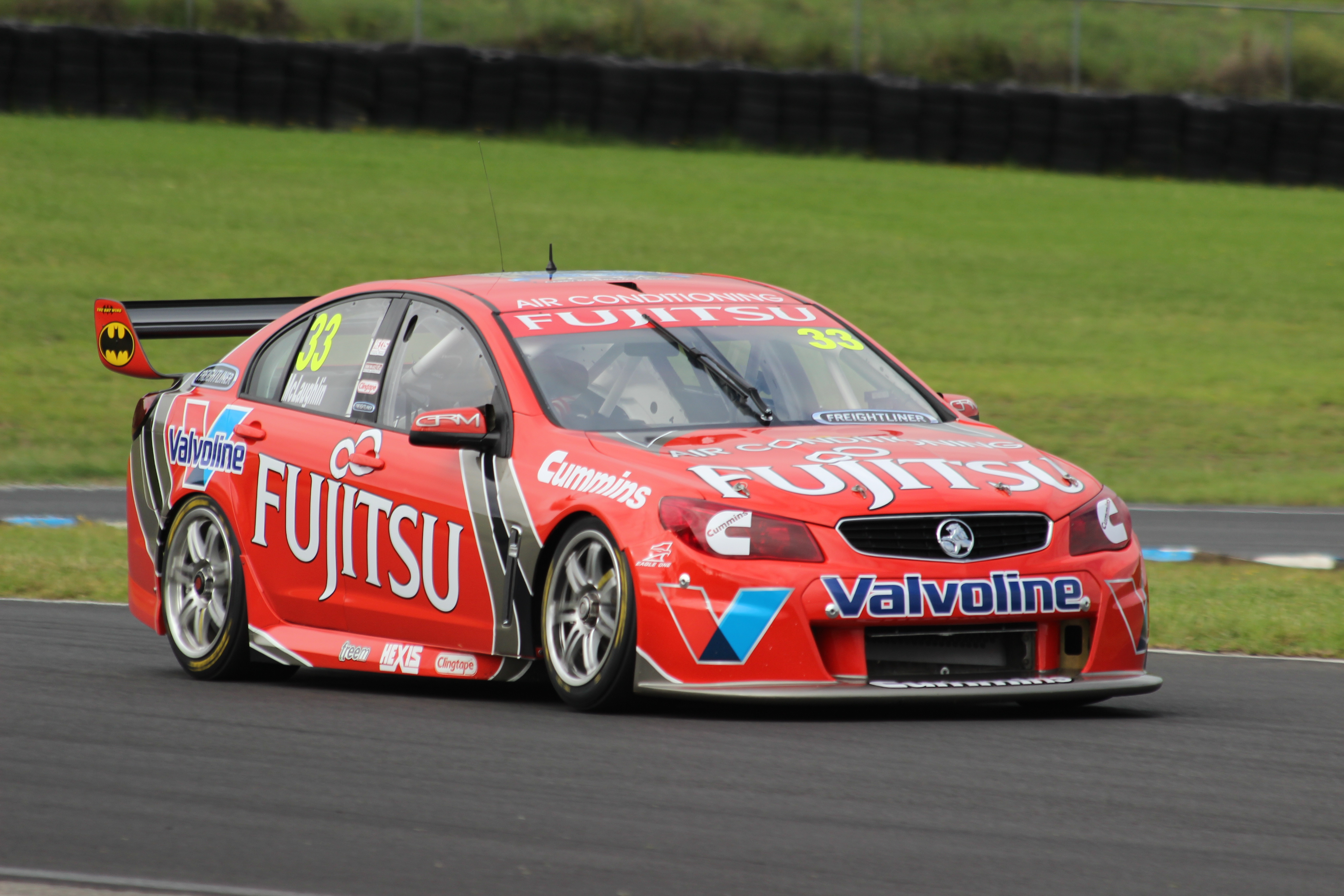
McLaughlin at the 2013 V8 Supercars test day

McLaughlin made his debut in the Supercars Championship at the Sandown 500 in 2012, as a co-driver to Jonathon Webb at Tekno Autosports. The pair performed well at both Sandown and Bathurst, finishing in tenth place at Sandown and in sixth place at Bathurst. McLaughlin also drove at the Sydney 500 for Garry Rogers Motorsport after Alexandre Prémat was forced out of the Sunday race due to extreme heat exhaustion the day before. McLaughlin was later signed by Garry Rogers Motorsport as a full-time driver for the 2013 season.

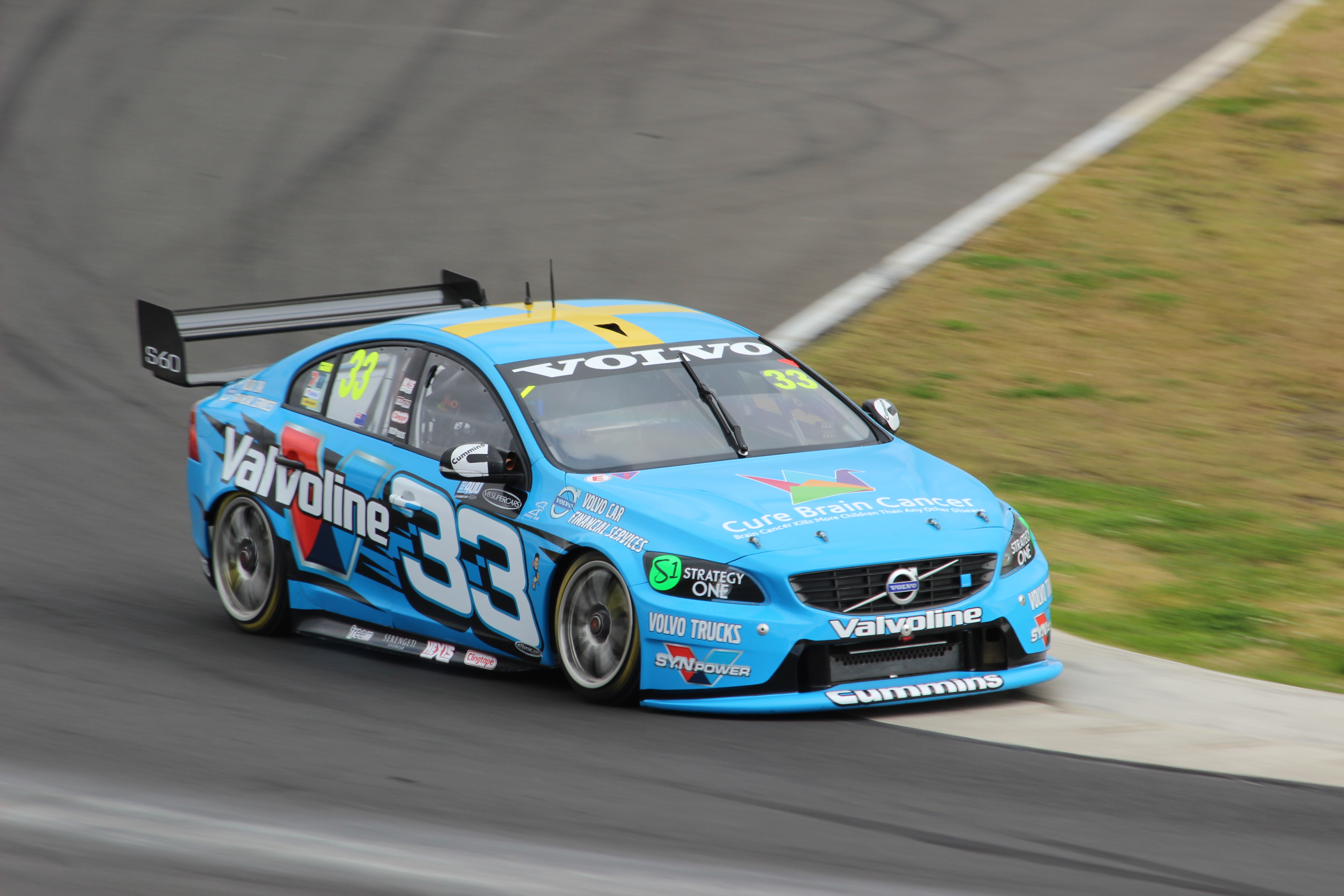
McLaughlin racing at the 2014 Sydney Motorsport Park 400

McLaughlin continued with Garry Rogers Motorsport into 2014, under its new identity as Volvo Polestar Racing (later Volvo Cyan Racing). On 1 March 2014, McLaughlin scored a podium finish in Volvo's return to the series at the Clipsal 500 Adelaide. Four race wins at Barbagallo, Sydney Motorsport Park, and two wins at Phillip Island. He finished fifth in the standings.

=== 2017 ===
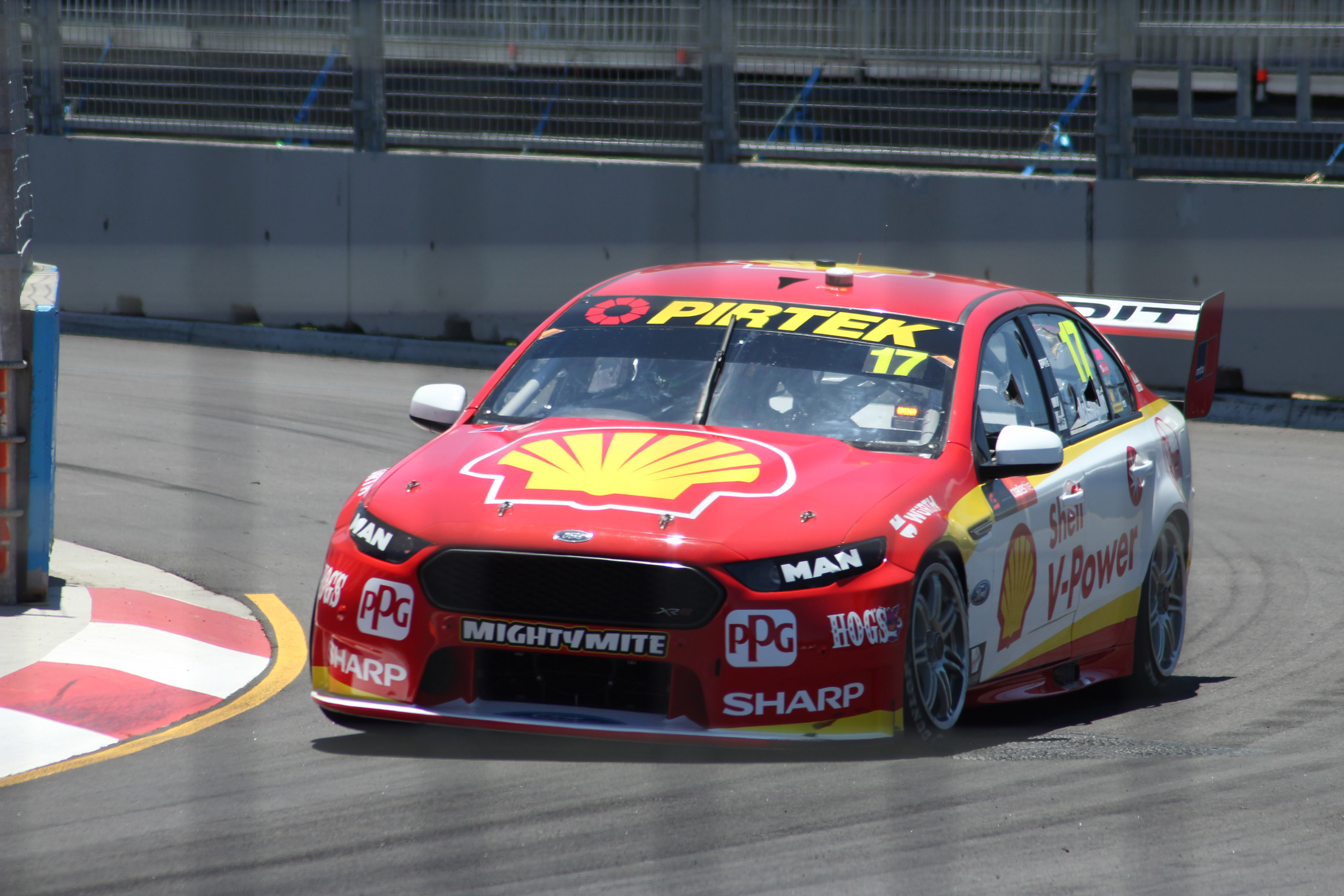
McLaughlin racing at the 2017 Newcastle 500, where he scored pole position for both races and won the first race of the weekend

For 2017, McLaughlin moved from Garry Rogers Motorsport to DJR Team Penske to partner Fabian Coulthard. Throughout the year, McLaughlin was dominant in qualifying; acquiring sixteen pole positions. Along with a string of strong results, McLaughlin would find himself in the box seat for a maiden championship title. After starting strongly in the final round at Newcastle, a chaotic second race saw McLaughlin pick up three penalties which would eventually contribute toward him narrowly missing out on the title to Jamie Whincup.

=== 2018 ===
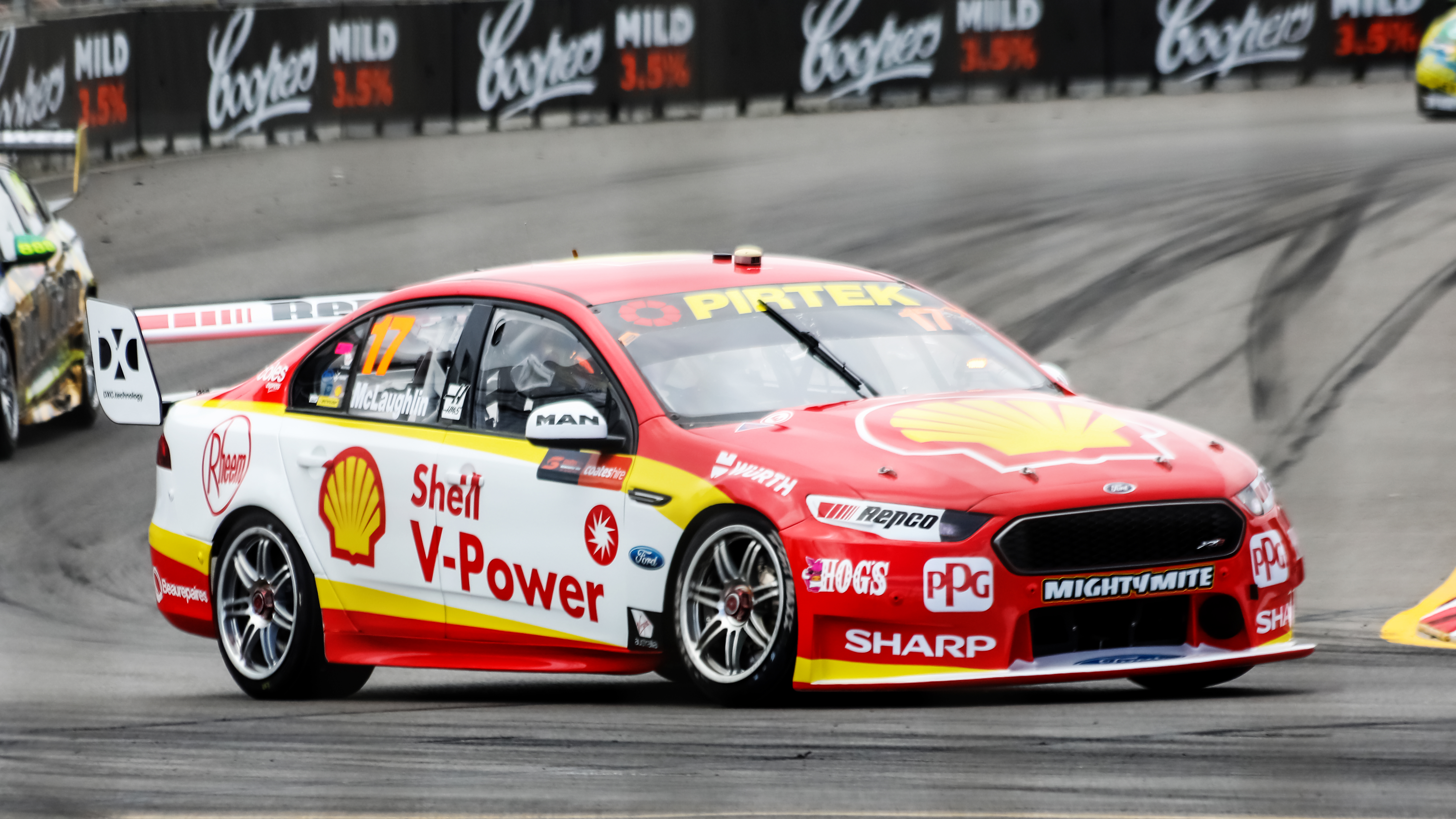
McLaughlin at the 2018 Newcastle 500, where he secured his maiden championship

In 2018, McLaughlin continued to race with DJR Team Penske. He won seven out of the 34 races, winning in Melbourne, Phillip Island, Barbagallo, Hidden Valley, and Ipswich. McLaughlin finished third at Bathurst alongside Alexandre Prémat in which was the Ford Falcon's final appearance at Mount Panorama. On 4 November, at Pukekohe Park Raceway, McLaughlin won race twenty-nine to join compatriot Shane van Gisbergen in winning the Jason Richards Memorial Trophy. In Newcastle, McLaughlin won race thirty (after van Gisbergen was stripped of his victory following a pit lane violation, demoting him to fifth) and finished second in race thirty-one to become the 2018 Virgin Australia Supercars champion.

=== 2019 ===
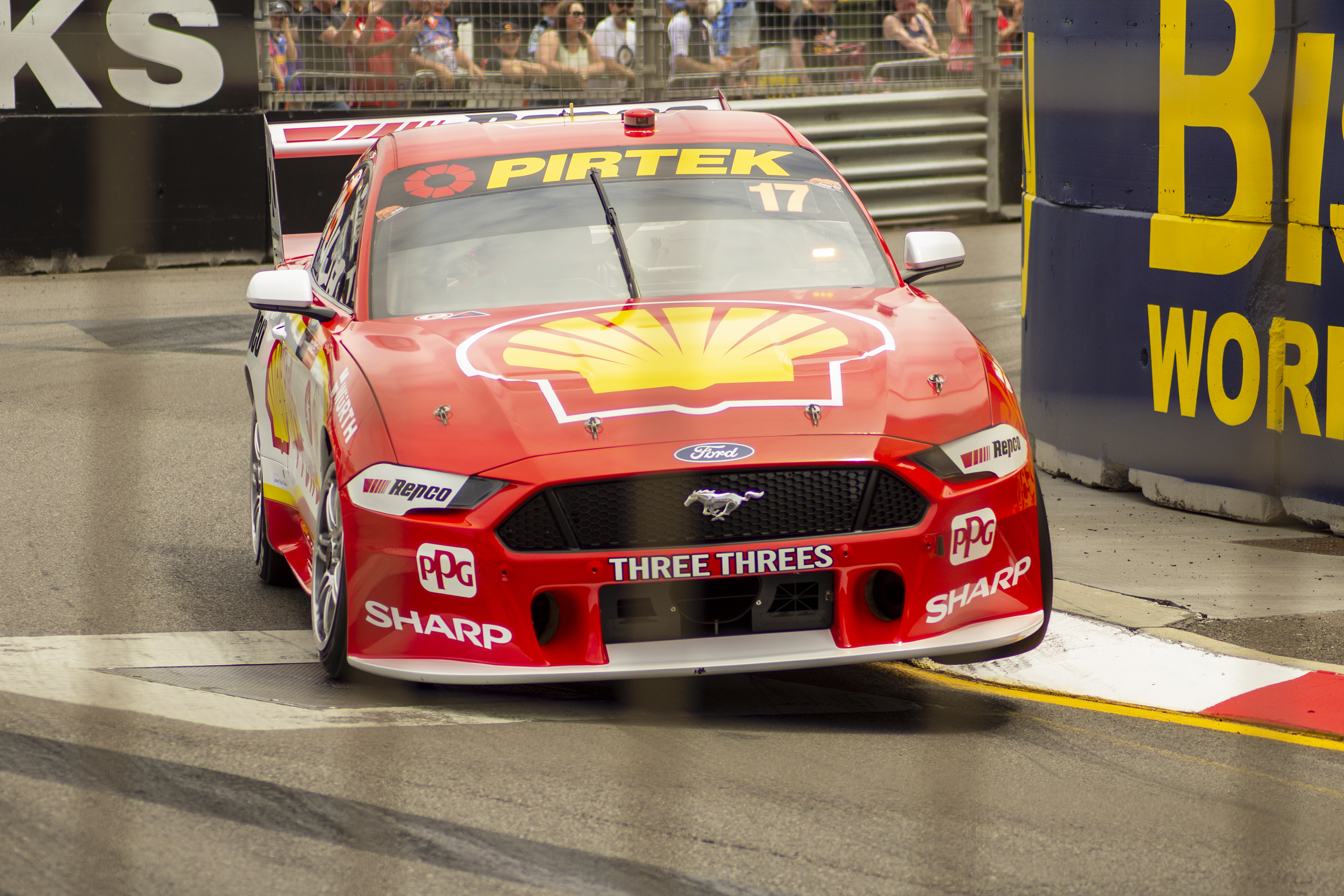
McLaughlin racing at the 2019 Newcastle 500

In 2019, DJR Team Penske debuted the Ford Mustang, which replaced the Falcon. McLaughlin was able to continue his dominance with the team, with eighteen wins, which broke the record for most wins in a single year, fifteen pole positions, eighteen fastest laps, and 22 podiums to his name. He became the first-ever driver to claim the Darwin Triple Crown, after winning the first race, claiming pole for the second race, and winning the second race. On 13 October 2019, McLaughlin finally won Bathurst for the first time, with Alexandre Prémat as Scott's co-driver. Two weeks after this he had the biggest crash of his career, a 43g impact at the Gold Coast. He then had to drive a new car, due to chassis damage from the crash, for the last two rounds and was still able to successfully defend his championship title, with a round to go at Sandown.

=== 2020 ===
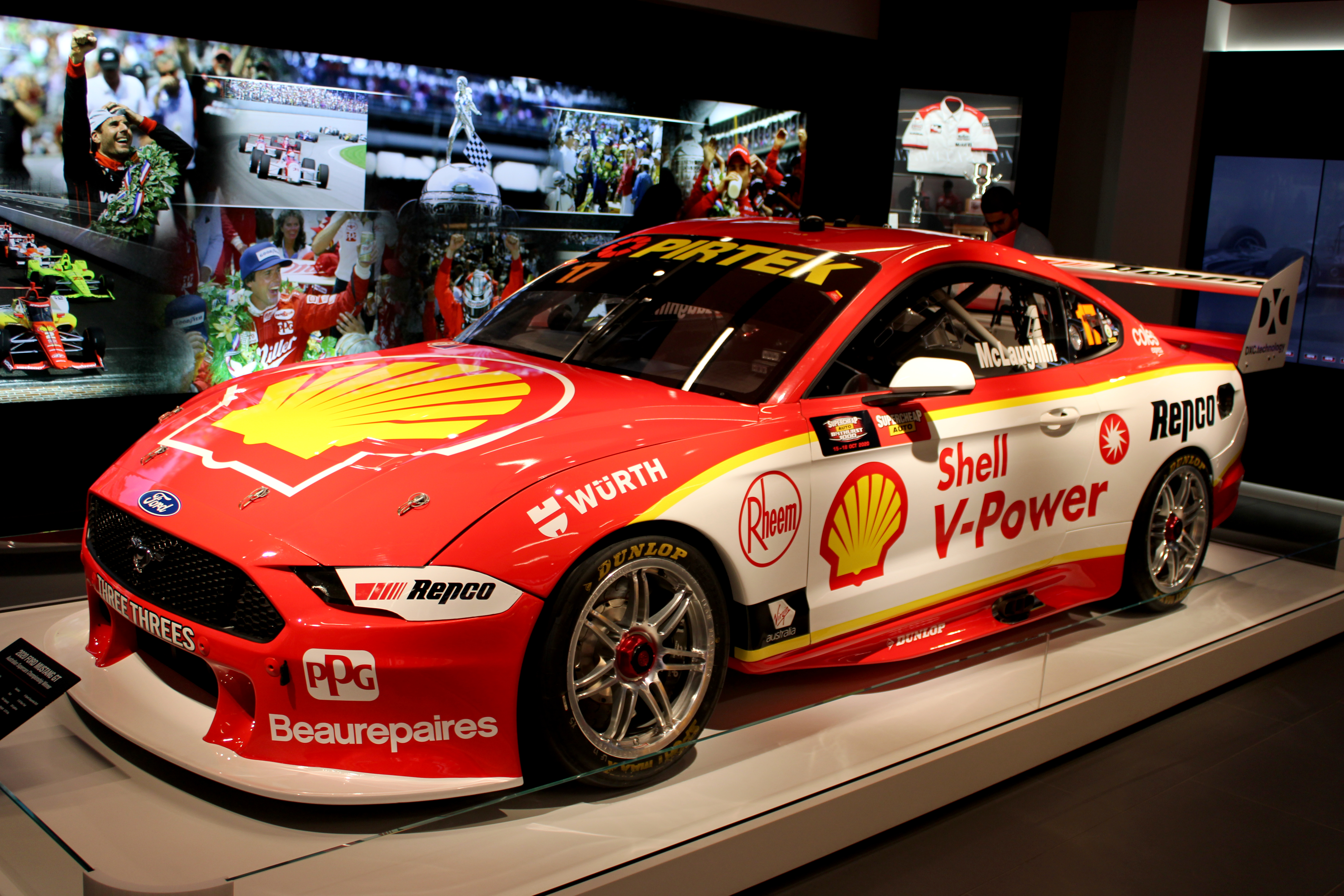
Scott McLaughlin's 2020 Ford Mustang GT on display at the Indianapolis Motor Speedway Museum

In a 2020 season shortened by the COVID-19 pandemic, McLaughlin won his third consecutive and to date last Supercars Championship and the final championship for DJR Team Penske. He scored thirteen wins on the season to go with eight podium finishes and fifteen pole positions.

=== 2021 ===
McLaughlin and Team Penske attempted to partner with Dick Johnson Racing again to field a car for the 2021 Bathurst 1000 but due to pandemic-related travel restrictions, he was not able to attend the race. McLaughlin stated that in future seasons he intends to compete within the Bathurst 1000 with Team Penske's backing after he completes the IndyCar season.

== IndyCar ==
Speculation around McLaughlin moving to one of Penske's other motorsports programs began in 2019 when Penske team president Tim Cindric and McLaughlin met in Australia to discuss McLaughlin's future in the Penske organisation. Cindric originally envisioned moving McLaughlin to Penske's WeatherTech SportsCar Championship programme to race alongside Helio Castroneves in Penske's Acura Daytona Prototype International entry and potentially competing in the World Endurance Championship. McLaughlin however expressed interest in moving to Penske's team in the Indycar Series. He stated his primary motivators were the challenge of racing open-wheel race cars, his long time goal of racing in the Indianapolis 500, and competing against his childhood hero and fellow New Zealander Scott Dixon. Cindric was sceptical about moving McLaughlin to Indycar as McLaughlin had not driven an open-wheel racecar since he raced in Formula Ford. McLaughlin changed Cindric's mind by altering his strength and conditioning regimen along with undertaking private simulator time that to show he had the talent and physical fitness to move from the mechanical grip reliant Supercars to the downforce reliant Dallara DW12, all during the middle of the 2019 Supercars Championship.

In January 2020, McLaughlin tested a Team Penske IndyCar at Sebring International Raceway. Team Penske driver Will Power hailed McLaughlin as a phenomenal driver after the test. In February 2020 McLaughlin completed his first laps on an oval during Team Penske's test at Texas Motor Speedway, with reigning Indycar Series champion and future teammate Josef Newgarden hailing McLaughlin's ability to quickly adapt to the demands of racing the DW12 on ovals. On 5 February, Penske announced that McLaughlin will race a fourth Team Penske entry at the Grand Prix of Indianapolis. However, due to the COVID-19 pandemic, McLaughlin was unable to travel to the United States for that race. On 17 September, Team Penske announced that McLaughlin would instead make his IndyCar debut at the Firestone Grand Prix of St. Petersburg on 25 October. The day before the race he posted on his personal Instagram feed that he signed a multi-year contract with Penske to compete full time in the series.

=== 2021 ===
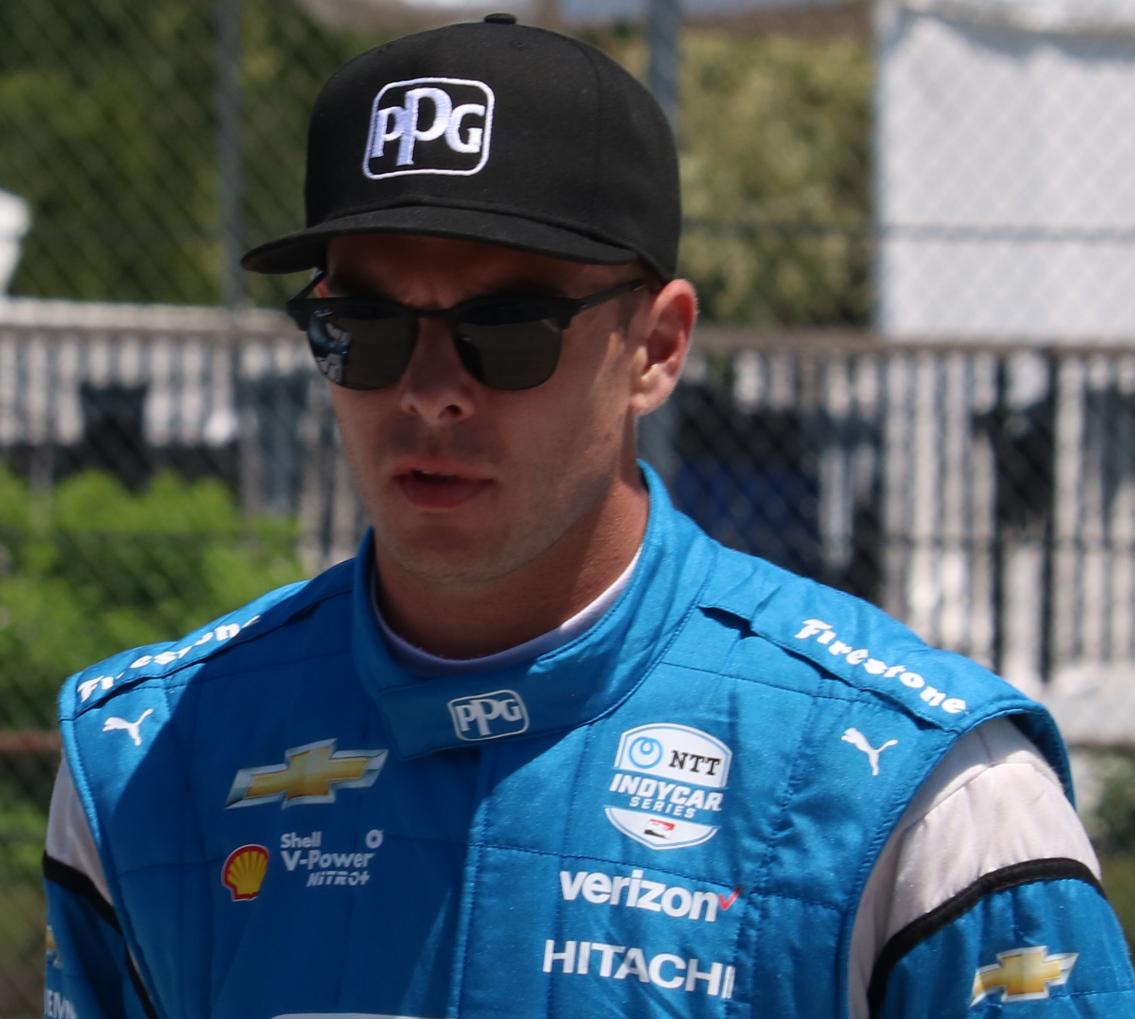
McLaughlin at Road America in 2021

On January 25, 2021, McLaughlin and Penske announced that PPG Paints would be the primary sponsor for most of his entries in the Indycar series in his rookie year, while Florida based office technology supplier DEX Imaging and used car outlet Car Shop would sponsor him for select events. For the 2021 Indianapolis 500 he drove a Pennzoil-sponsored car, with the livery paying homage to that company's famed "Yellow Submarine" designs of the 1980s. Going into his rookie IndyCar season, both Tim Cindric and Roger Penske let McLaughlin know that he was not expected to compete for wins and that his primary goal would be to finish all the races.

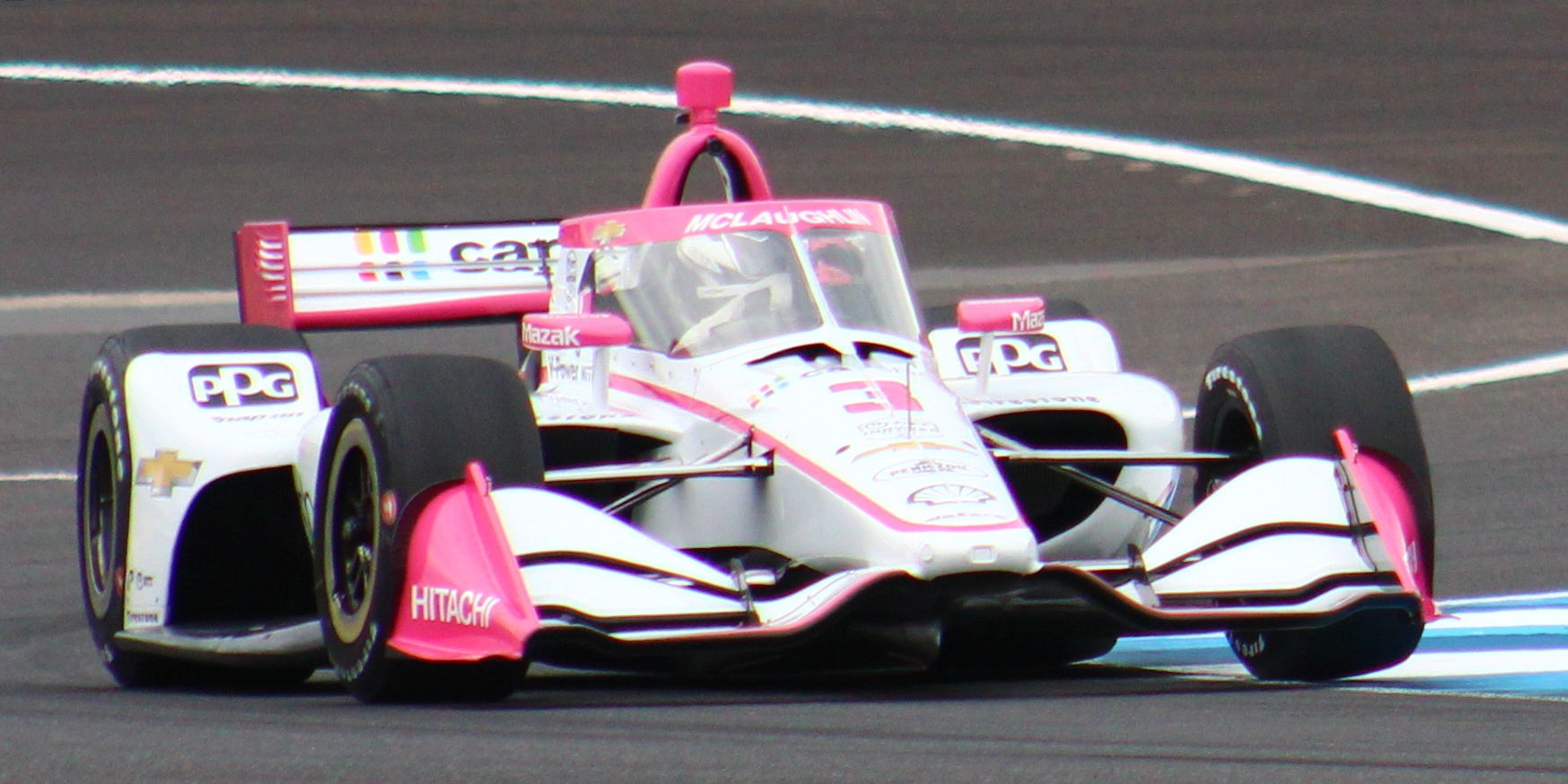
McLaughlin driving in the 2021 Big Machine Spiked Coolers Grand Prix

McLaughlin spent 2021 learning the different aspects of IndyCar racing. In addition to coming to grips with a car reliant on downforce rather than mechanical grip McLaughlin also had to learn how to drive a turbocharged car with temperature-sensitive tires and carbon-ceramic brakes, all aspects that were drastically different from the cars he raced in the Supercars Championship. McLaughlin admitted after the season that his biggest struggle of the season was learning how to build and manage the temperature of the tires and brakes, which is more critical and difficult in an open-wheel racecar like an IndyCar than it is in a touring car that McLaughlin was used to racing. In qualifying for road street course races, which made up 75% of the IndyCar calendar, McLaughlin struggled through the first three-quarters of the season with understanding how to build and maintain an optimal temperature in the tires and brakes in the short amount of time given in IndyCar qualifying on the road and street courses. These struggles in qualifying meant McLaughlin started with an average position of sixteenth on the road and street courses, meaning he would have to fight his way through traffic and work harder for the position despite recording a slightly above average 4.5 overtakes per race. He recorded his first fast six qualifying slot and first top-ten finish on a road course at the first race on the IMS Road Course, where he qualified sixth and finished eighth. McLaughlin would struggle on road and street courses after the Indianapolis 500 and did not pick up another top-ten finish on a road course until he finished ninth at Portland.

McLaughlin's strongest performances in his rookie season were on the ovals, with the strongest moment of his rookie season coming in the first race at Texas Motor Speedway, the Genesys 300. In his first race ever on an oval McLaughlin started fifteenth due to qualifying being cancelled by inclement weather, forcing the drivers to line up based on their championship points standings. Despite this technicality McLaughlin got his first IndyCar podium by finishing second to Scott Dixon. Not only did McLaughlin finish ahead of Tony Kanaan and Pietro Fittipaldi (who filled in for Johnson and Grosjean respectively), he finished ahead of all his Penske teammates and all the active drivers who had won the Indianapolis 500 other than Dixon; Takuma Sato, Alexander Rossi, Ryan Hunter-Reay, Tony Kanaan, and teammates Will Power and Simon Pagenaud. He picked up further top ten finishes in the second race in Texas and at Gateway. When asked why his performances on ovals were better than on road and street courses despite having never raced on them before McLaughlin stated that it largely came down to the oval qualifying format being similar to that in the Supercars Championship and that the IndyCar oval tires came to temperature significantly faster than the road and street course tires, giving him the confidence to push harder on ovals than he did on road and street courses.

During the run-up and qualifying for the 105th Indianapolis 500 McLaughlin was mentored by former Penske driver and four-time Indianapolis 500 winner Rick Mears. Although Mears advised all the Penske drivers he focused the most on preparing McLaughlin for the 500. Mears' mentorship paid off for McLaughlin and led to him qualifying seventeenth on the grid, the highest Penske driver in what was considered Penske's worst qualifying performance for the 500 since 1995. During the race McLaughlin ran for large portions at the back of the top ten before incurring a drive-through penalty on lap 116 for speeding in the pit lane, leading to a twentieth place finish. For his efforts McLaughlin was named Indianapolis 500 Rookie Of The Year, the third Penske driver to be named so along with Mears and race winner Helio Castroneves.

The main narrative surrounding McLaughlin's rookie season was his place in a unique class of IndyCar rookies that included NASCAR Cup Series champion Jimmie Johnson and Formula One veteran Romain Grosjean, with many pundits speculating which of the three, would have the strongest season. McLaughlin would be the only one of the three to run a full schedule in 2021, as Johnson opted not to race on any of the oval courses and Grosjean only chose to race at one of the four oval races. While Johnson would take the longest of the three to adapt to IndyCar racing McLaughlin and Grosjean were frequently measured against one another on the track. McLaughlin only outdueled Grosjean four times in their rookie season; at St. Petersburg when he raced there for the second time in six months, at Grosjean's first oval race at Gateway, and at Portland and Long Beach when Grosjean was caught up in accidents caused by other drivers early in both races. This meant that Grosjean had a chance at winning the IndyCar Rookie of the Year award despite not running a full schedule and McLaughlin racing in the double points earning Indianapolis 500. The two drivers largely downplayed the comparisons to one another, with Grosjean stating it was unfair to compare the two given his nearly two decades of open-wheel racing experience while McLaughlin only had one season in open-wheel racing before him joining the IndyCar Series.

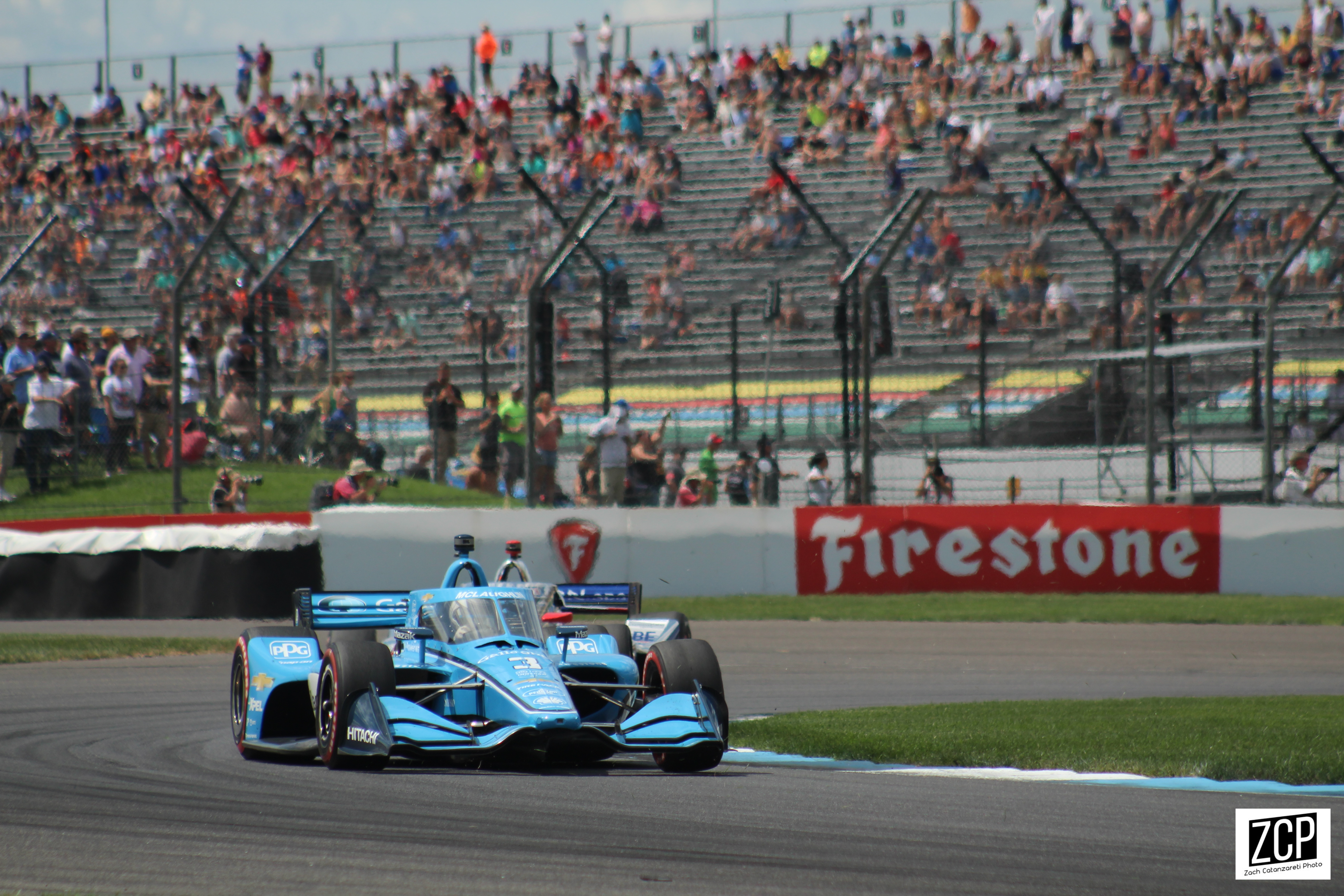
McLaughlin racing at the Indianapolis Motor Speedway

=== 2022 ===
In 2022, McLaughlin would put together all that he learned in his rookie season and became a championship contender in IndyCar. He took his first IndyCar win at the season opener at St. Petersburg, took a second win later in the season at Mid Ohio, and a third win on the season at Portland. He picked up additional podium finishes at Texas, the second race at Iowa, Nashville, and Gateway, along with earning three pole positions on the season. McLaughin would go into the season finale at Laguna Seca as one of five drivers contending for the Astor Cup, despite crashing out of the Indianapolis 500 and missing out on double points. He ultimately finished fourth in the championship standings.

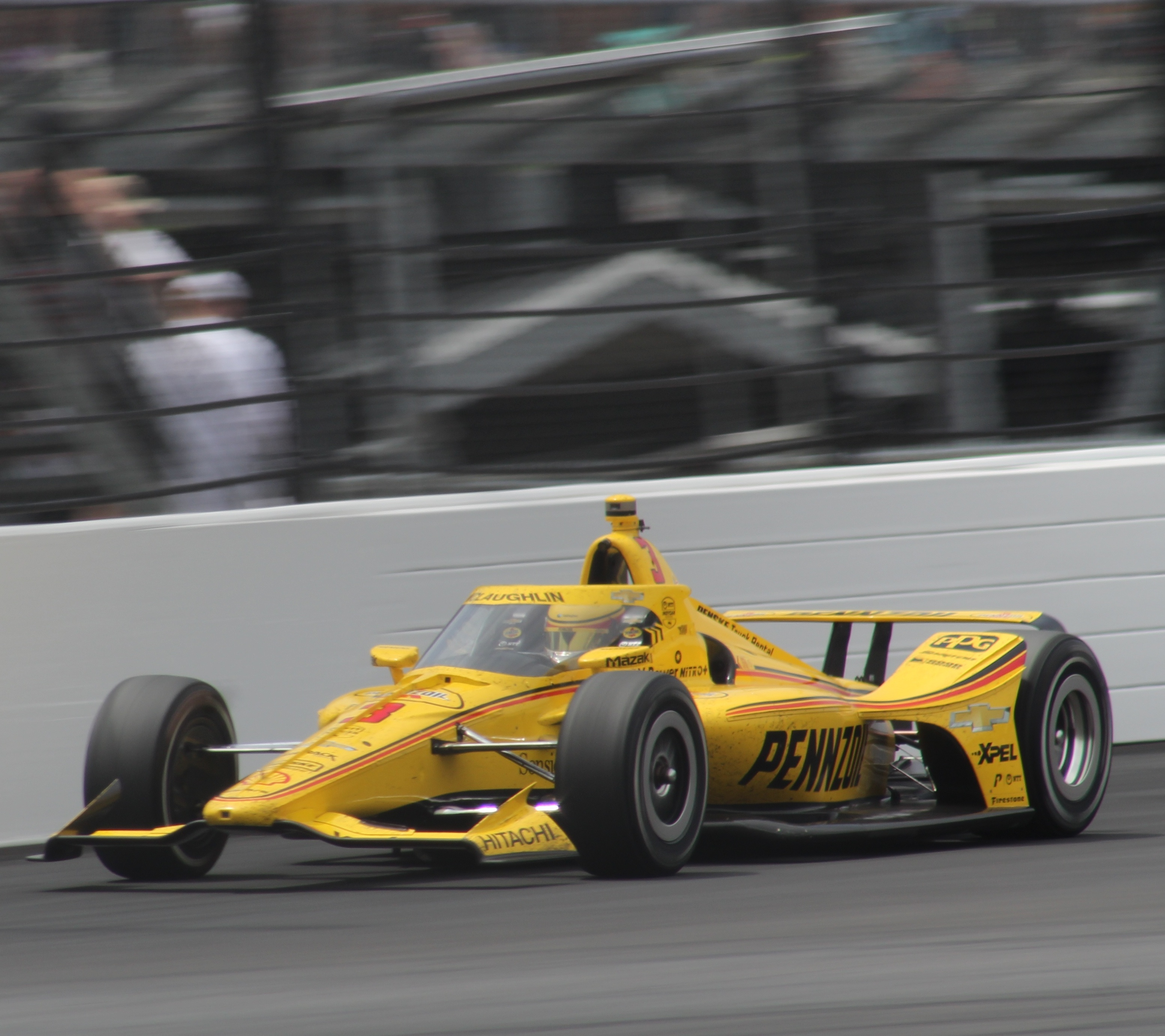
McLaughlin during the 2023 Indianapolis 500

=== 2023 ===
McLaughlin agreed on a multi-year deal to remain with Team Penske from 2023 onwards. He picked up his only win of the season at Barber. Despite the lone win McLaughlin finished as the highest scoring driver for Team Penske in 2023, finishing third in the standings.

=== 2024 ===
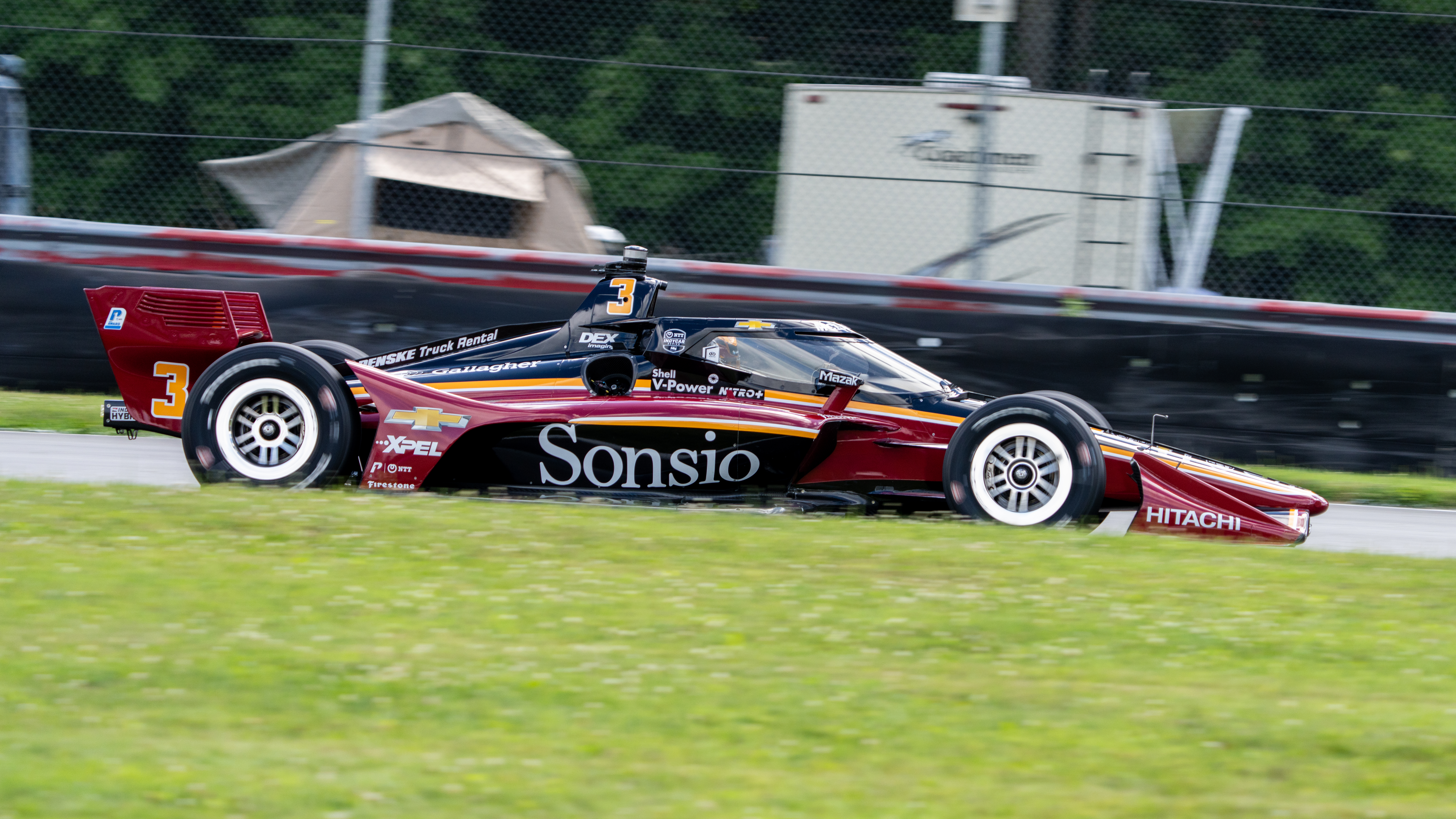
McLaughlin at Mid-Ohio Sports Car Course in 2024

McLaughlin got off to a rough start in 2024. He started the year finishing third in St. Petersburg, but was stripped of his result after it was found out that Team Penske had illegally manipulated ECU software during the race to allow their drivers to use push to pass on restarts, which McLaughlin took advantage of. He took a mechanical DNF at Long Beach but the year began to turn around as he took his first win of the season at Barber. McLaughlin qualified on pole for the 108th Indianapolis 500, though only finished sixth in the race. Further podium finishes at Road America and Mid Ohio helped McLaughlin rebound on the season. He took his first career win on an oval at the first race of the Iowa double header, putting him in the top five of the championship. He secured a second oval win, and third win of the season, in the second race of the Milwaukee double header.

=== 2025 ===
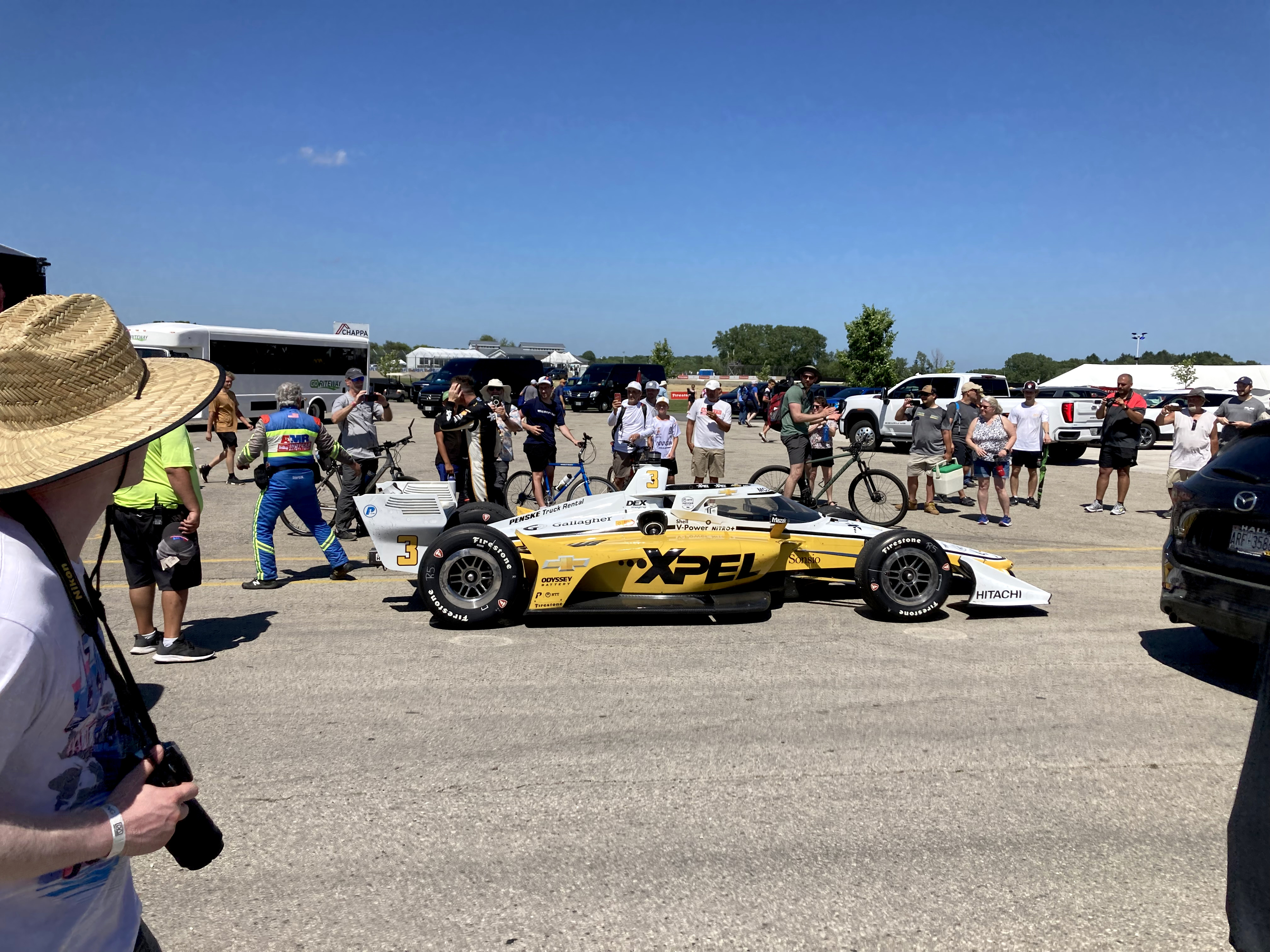
McLaughlin after the 2025 XPEL Grand Prix at Road America

McLaughlin crashed during the pace laps prior to the start of the 2025 Indianapolis 500.

=== 2026 ===
McLaughlin got poles at St. Petersburg, Milwaukee 1, and Laguna Seca, where he won at Laguna Seca.

== Personal life ==
McLaughlin is married to Karly Paone, a schoolteacher from Long Island. The two met by chance in 2016 in Las Vegas when McLaughlin made the trip to help a fellow racer competing in an international karting tournament. Paone moved to Australia with McLaughlin in 2018 and the two were married in 2020. After McLaughlin moved from Supercars to the IndyCar Series he and Karly relocated to North Carolina to be closer to Team Penske's headquarters.

McLaughlin has two dogs, one named Chase and the other named Luna. He began watching American team sports after he met his wife and is a fan of the New York Mets, New York Knicks, and Carolina Panthers.

On October 10, 2024, McLaughlin's wife Karly gave birth to Lucy Violet McLaughlin.

On April 29, 2025, McLaughlin announced via his social media his naturalization as an American citizen.

== Racing record ==
=== Karting career summary ===
Season	Series	Position
2004	Kartsport NZ National Sprint Championship - 100cc Junior Restricted Yamaha class	19th
2006	Australian National Sprint Kart Championship - Junior Clubman	20th
2006	Australian National Sprint Kart Championship - Junior National Heavy	7th
2007	Australian National Sprint Kart Championship - Junior Clubman	17th
2007	Australian National Sprint Kart Championship - Junior National Light	**2nd**
2008	Rotax Max Challenge Grand Finals - Junior	19th
2008	Gen-i Rotax Max Challenge NZ - Arai Helmets Junior class	**2nd**
2008	Australian National Sprint Kart Championship - Junior Clubman	**3rd**
2009	Queensland Sprint Kart Championship - Clubman Light	**3rd**
2009	Australian National Sprint Kart Championship - Clubman Light	13th
2009	NZ Top Half Series - 100cc Yamaha Light	11th
2019	Kartsport NZ National Sprint Championship - Rotax Max Heavy	**2nd**

=== Racing career summary ===
Season	Series	Team	Races	Wins	Poles	F/Laps	Podiums	Points	Position
2010	Fujitsu V8 Supercar Series	Stone Brothers Racing	14	0	0	0	0	678	12th
2010	Victorian Formula Ford Championship	N/A	3	1	1	1	3	94	12th
2010	Australian Mini Challenge	N/A	6	0	0	0	0	203	13rd
2010–11	New Zealand V8s	Racing Projects	7	0	0	0	1	755	8th
2011	Fujitsu V8 Supercar Series	Stone Brothers Racing	17	1	1	1	4	1461	4th
2012	V8 SuperTourers Championship	MPC Motorsport	9	3	3	1	4	2055	**3rd**
2012	Dunlop V8 Supercar Series	Stone Brothers Racing	5	1	0	1	4	1761	**1st**
2012	Dunlop V8 Supercar Series	Matt Stone Racing	15	3	3	2	8	1761	**1st**
2012	International V8 Supercars Championship	Garry Rogers Motorsport	1	0	0	0	0	422	33rd
2013	V8 SuperTourers Championship	Scott McLaughlin Racing	21	1	0	0	7	2744	5th
2013	International V8 Supercars Championship	Garry Rogers Motorsport	37	2	0	2	3	1934	10th
2014	International V8 Supercars Championship	Garry Rogers Motorsport	39	4	10	5	10	2509	5th
2015	International V8 Supercars Championship	Garry Rogers Motorsport	36	0	5	0	5	2205	8th
2015	Kuala Lumpur City Grand Prix Supercars Challenge	Garry Rogers Motorsport	?	?	?	?	?	?	**2nd**
2016	International V8 Supercars Championship	Garry Rogers Motorsport	30	2	2	2	8	2806	**3rd**
2016	Scandinavian Touring Car Championship	Polestar Cyan Racing	2	0	0	1	1	36	13th
2017	Virgin Australia Supercars Championship	DJR Team Penske	27	8	16	6	16	3021	**2nd**
2018	Virgin Australia Supercars Championship	DJR Team Penske	32	9	13	4	21	3944	**1st**
2019	Virgin Australia Supercars Championship	DJR Team Penske	29	18	15	8	22	3872	**1st**
2020	Virgin Australia Supercars Championship	DJR Team Penske	27	13	15	1	21	2576	**1st**
2020	IndyCar Series	Team Penske	1	0	0	0	0	8	35th
2021	IndyCar Series	Team Penske	16	0	0	0	0	305	14th
2022	IndyCar Series	Team Penske	17	3	3	1	7	510	4th
2023	IndyCar Series	Team Penske	17	1	2	1	4	488	**3rd**
2023	IMSA SportsCar Championship - LMP2	Tower Motorsports	3	1	1	0	1	639	18th
2024	IndyCar Series	Team Penske	17	3	5	2	7	505	**3rd**
2024	IMSA SportsCar Championship - LMP2	Tower Motorsports	1	0	0	0	0	278	44th
2025	IndyCar Series	Team Penske	17	0	1	1	3	356	10th
2025	IMSA SportsCar Championship - GTD Pro	Trackhouse by TF Sport	1	0	0	0	0	243	35th
2026	IMSA SportsCar Championship - GTD	DXDT Racing	1	0	0	0	0	168	78th
2026	IndyCar Series	Team Penske	18	1	3	1	4	483	6th
2026	Intercontinental GT Challenge	Johor Motorsports JMR	1	0	0	0	0	12	24th

* Season still in progress

=== Super2 Series results ===
Super2 Series results
Year	Team	No.	Car	1	2	3	4	5	6	7	8	9	10	11	12	13	14	15	16	17	18	Position	Points
2010	Stone Brothers Racing	93	Ford BF Falcon	ADE; R1	ADE; R2	QLD; R3; 9	QLD; R4; Ret	QLD; R5; DNS	WIN; R6; 13	WIN; R7; 7	WIN; R8; 4	TOW; R9; 9	TOW; R10; 8	TOW; R11; 12	BAT; R12; Ret	BAT; R13; DNS	SAN; R14; 6	SAN; R15; Ret	SAN; R16; 6	SYD; R17; Ret	SYD; R18; 6	12th	678
2011	Stone Brothers Racing	93	Ford BF Falcon	ADE; R1; 7	ADE; R2; 2	BAR; R3; 3	BAR; R4; 3	TOW; R5; 16	TOW; R6; 13	TOW; R7; 8	QLD; R8; 1	**QLD**; **R9**; 5	QLD; R10; 5	BAT; R11; 10	BAT; R12; 5							4th	1461
2011	Stone Brothers Racing	93	Ford FG Falcon													SAN; R13; 5	SAN; R14; Ret	SAN; R15; 4	SYD; R16; 10	SYD; R17; 4		4th	1461
2012	Stone Brothers Racing	93	Ford FG Falcon	ADE; R1; 2	ADE; R2; 3	BAR; R3; 3	BAR; R4; 4	BAR; R5; 1														1st	1761
2012	Matt Stone Racing	93	Ford FG Falcon						TOW; R6; 1	**TOW**; **R7**; 1	**TOW**; **R8**; 2	QLD; R9; 3	QLD; R10; 2	QLD; R11; 3	BAT; R12; 13	BAT; R13; 6	WIN; R14; 4	WIN; R15; 10	WIN; R16; 4	SYD; R17; 1	**SYD**; **R18**; 3	1st	1761

=== Supercars Championship results ===
(Races in bold indicate pole position) (Races in italics indicate fastest lap)

Supercars results
Year	Team	No.	Car	1	2	3	4	5	6	7	8	9	10	11	12	13	14	15	16	17	18	19	20	21	22	23	24	25	26	27	28	29	30	31	32	33	34	35	36	37	38	39	Position	Points
2012	Tekno Autosports	19	Holden VE Commodore	ADE; R1	ADE; R2	SYM; R3	SYM; R4	HAM; R5	HAM; R6	BAR; R7	BAR; R8	BAR; R9	PHI; R10	PHI; R11	HID; R12	HID; R13	TOW; R14	TOW; R15	QLD; R16	QLD; R17	SMP; R18	SMP; R19	SAN; Q 7	SAN; R20; 10	BAT; R21; 6	SUR; R22	SUR; R23	YMC; R24	YMC; R25	YMC; R26	WIN; R27	WIN; R28	SYD; R29										33rd	422
2012	Garry Rogers Motorsport	33	Holden VE Commodore																															SYD; R30; 17									33rd	422
2013	Garry Rogers Motorsport	33	Holden VF Commodore	ADE; R1; 6	ADE; R2; 9	SYM; R3; 8	SYM; R4; 8	SYM; R5; 8	PUK; R6; 1	PUK; R7; 24	PUK; R8; Ret	PUK; R9; DNS	BAR; R10; 12	BAR; R11; 14	BAR; R12; 13	COA; R13; 28	COA; R14; 7	COA; R15; 11	COA; R16; 27	HID; R17; 11	HID; R18; 27	HID; R19; 8	TOW; R20; 14	TOW; R21; 9	QLD; R22; 2	QLD; R23; 1	QLD; R24; 20	WIN; R25; 19	WIN; R26; 9	WIN; R27; 14	SAN; Q 9	SAN; R28; 8	BAT; R29; 8	SUR; R30; 22	SUR; R31; 23	PHI; R32; 19	PHI; R33; 19	PHI; R34; 11	SYD; R35; Ret	SYD; R36; 12			10th	1934
2014	Garry Rogers Motorsport	33	Volvo S60	ADE; R1; 7	ADE; R2; 2	ADE; R3; Ret	SYM; R4; 5	SYM; R5; 4	SYM; R6; 6	WIN; R7; Ret	WIN; R8; 25	**WIN**; **R9**; **16**	PUK; R10; 8	PUK; R11; 6	**PUK**; **R12**; **3**	**PUK**; **R13**; **2**	**BAR**; **R14**; **1**	BAR; R15; 4	BAR; R16; 17	HID; R17; 4	HID; R18; 5	HID; R19; 8	TOW; R20; 6	TOW; R21; 14	TOW; R22; 9	QLD; R23; 3	**QLD**; **R24**; **19**	QLD; R25; 19	SMP; R26; Ret	**SMP**; **R27**; **Ret**	**SMP**; **R28**; **1**	SAN; Q 4	SAN; R29; 8	BAT; R30; 17	SUR; R31; 7	**SUR**; **R32**; **2**	**PHI**; **R33**; **1**	PHI; R34; 6	PHI; R35; 1	SYD; R36; 4	SYD; R37; 3	**SYD**; **R38**; **8**	5th	2509
2015	Garry Rogers Motorsport	33	Volvo S60	ADE; R1; DNS	ADE; R2; 9	ADE; R3; 18	SYM; R4; Ret	SYM; R5; 9	SYM; R6; 7	BAR; R7; 11	BAR; R8; Ret	BAR; R9; 18	WIN; R10; 25	WIN; R11; 9	WIN; R12; 9	HID; R13; Ret	HID; R14; 9	HID; R15; 11	TOW; R16; 4	**TOW**; **R17**; **Ret**	QLD; R18; 2	QLD; R19; 9	QLD; R20; 13	SMP; R21; 8	SMP; R22; 4	**SMP**; **R23**; **5**	SAN; Q 16	SAN; R24; 14	BAT; R25; 5	SUR; R26; 21	**SUR**; **R27**; **6**	PUK; R28; 9	PUK; R29; 3	**PUK**; **R30**; **6**	PHI; R31; 3	**PHI**; **R32**; **2**	PHI; R33; 2	SYD; R34; 8	SYD; R35; 5	SYD; R36; 19			8th	2205
2016	Garry Rogers Motorsport	33	Volvo S60	ADE; R1; 4	ADE; R2; 4	ADE; R3; 12	SYM; R4; 26	SYM; R5; 4	**PHI**; **R6**; **1**	**PHI**; **R7**; **1**	BAR; R8; 11	BAR; R9; 2	WIN; R10; 2	WIN; R11; 11	HID; R12; 10	HID; R13; 7	TOW; R14; 24	TOW; R15; 5	QLD; R16; 15	QLD; R17; 6	SMP; R18; 5	SMP; R19; 6	SAN; Q 3	SAN; R20; 4	BAT; R21; 15	SUR; R22; 2	SUR; R23; 3	PUK; R24; 3	PUK; R25; 7	PUK; R26; 7	PUK; R27; 3	SYD; R28; 4	SYD; R29; 5										3rd	2806
2017	DJR Team Penske	17	Ford FG X Falcon	ADE; R1; 17	ADE; R2; 2	**SYM**; **R3**; **14**	SYM; R4; 2	**PHI**; **R5**; **10**	**PHI**; **R6**; **14**	BAR; R7; 1	**BAR**; **R8**; **1**	**WIN**; **R9**; **1**	**WIN**; **R10**; **5**	HID; R11; 2	**HID**; **R12**; **1**	**TOW**; **R13**; **1**	**TOW**; **R14**; **2**	**QLD**; **R15**; **1**	**QLD**; **R16**; **2**	**SMP**; **R17**; **21**	**SMP**; **R18**; **4**	SAN; Q 2	SAN; R19; 2	**BAT**; **R20**; **Ret**	SUR; R21; 12	SUR; R22; 1	PUK; R23; 3	PUK; R24; 2	**NEW**; **R25**; **1**	**NEW**; **R26**; **18**													2nd	3021
2018	DJR Team Penske	17	Ford FG X Falcon	ADE; R1; 3	ADE; R2; 10	**MEL**; **R3**; **1**	MEL; R4; 2	**MEL**; **R5**; **15**	MEL; R6; 7	SYM; R7; 9	SYM; R8; 2	**PHI**; **R9**; **1**	**PHI**; **R10**; **1**	**BAR**; **R11**; **1**	**BAR**; **R12**; **1**	**WIN**; **R13**; **5**	**WIN**; **R14**; **3**	HID; R15; 1	HID; R16; 2	**TOW**; **R17**; **3**	TOW; R18; 3	**QLD**; **R19**; **1**	**QLD**; **R20**; **2**	**SMP**; **R21**; **3**	BEN; R22; 6	BEN; R23; 10	SAN; QR; 3	SAN; R24; 4	BAT; R25; 3	**SUR**; **R26**; **5**	SUR; R27; C	PUK; R28; 2	PUK; R29; 1	NEW; R30; 1	NEW; R31; 2								1st	3944
2019	DJR Team Penske	17	Ford Mustang S550	ADE; R1; 1	**ADE**; **R2**; **1**	**MEL**; **R3**; **1**	**MEL**; **R4**; **1**	**MEL**; **R5**; **DNS**	MEL; R6; 1	SYM; R7; 1	SYM; R8; 4	**PHI**; **R9**; **1**	**PHI**; **R10**; **2**	**BAR**; **R11**; **2**	**BAR**; **R12**; **1**	WIN; R13; 1	**WIN**; **R14**; **1**	**HID**; **R15**; **1**	**HID**; **R16**; **1**	TOW; R17; 1	TOW; R18; 11	**QLD**; **R19**; **4**	**QLD**; **R20**; **1**	BEN; R21; 1	**BEN**; **R22**; **1**	PUK; R23; 4	PUK; R24; 1	BAT; R25; 1	**SUR**; **R26**; **3**	SUR; R27; DNS	SAN; QR; 5	SAN; R28; 9	NEW; R29; 2	NEW; R30; 4									1st	3872
2020	DJR Team Penske	17	Ford Mustang S550	ADE; R1; 2	ADE; R2; 1	MEL; R3; C	MEL; R4; C	MEL; R5; C	MEL; R6; C	**SMP1**; **R7**; **1**	SMP1; R8; 3	**SMP1**; **R9**; **1**	**SMP2**; **R10**; **1**	**SMP2**; **R11**; **3**	SMP2; R12; 14	**HID1**; **R13**; **20**	**HID1**; **R14**; **1**	**HID1**; **R15**; **2**	HID2; R16; 1	**HID2**; **R17**; **1**	HID2; R18; 1	TOW1; R19; 7	TOW1; R20; 6	**TOW1**; **R21**; **1**	**TOW2**; **R22**; **1**	TOW2; R23; 2	TOW2; R24; 3	BEN1; R25; 14	**BEN1**; **R26**; **3**	**BEN1**; **R27**; **1**	**BEN2**; **R28**; **1**	**BEN2**; **R29**; **1**	**BEN2**; **R30**; **2**	BAT; R31; 5									1st	2576

=== Bathurst 1000 results ===
Year	Team	Car	Co-driver	Position	Laps
2012	Tekno Autosports	Holden Commodore VE	(Australia) Jonathon Webb	6th	161
2013	Garry Rogers Motorsport	Holden Commodore VF	(Australia) Jack Perkins	8th	161
2014	Garry Rogers Motorsport	Volvo S60	(France) Alexandre Prémat	17th	150
2015	Garry Rogers Motorsport	Volvo S60	(France) Alexandre Prémat	5th	161
2016	Garry Rogers Motorsport	Volvo S60	(Australia) David Wall	15th	159
2017	DJR Team Penske	Ford Falcon FG X	(France) Alexandre Prémat	DNF	74
2018	DJR Team Penske	Ford Falcon FG X	(France) Alexandre Prémat	**3rd**	161
2019	DJR Team Penske	Ford Mustang Mk.6	(France) Alexandre Prémat	**1st**	161
2020	DJR Team Penske	Ford Mustang Mk.6	(Australia) Tim Slade	5th	161

=== V8 SuperTourer results ===
Year	Team	No.	Car	1	2	3	4	5	6	7	8	9	10	11	12	13	14	15	16	17	18	19	20	21	Final pos	Points
2012	MPC Motorsport	93	Holden VE Commodore	HAM; R1; 10	HAM; R2; 15	HAM; R3; 3	RUA; R4; Ret	RUA; R5; 7	RUA; R6; 15	MAN; R7	MAN; R8	MAN; R9	**HAM**; **R10**; 1	**HAM**; **R11**; 1	**HAM**; **R12**; 1	TAU; R13; 2	TAU; R14; 1	PUK; R15; 1	**PUK**; **R16**; 2	PUK; R17; 2	**RUA**; **R18**; 1	RUA; R19; 15			1st	3474
2013	Scott McLaughlin Racing	1	Holden VE Commodore	HAM; R1; Ret	HAM; R2; Ret	HAM; R3; Ret	RUA; R4; 17	RUA; R5; 7	RUA; R6; Ret	PUK; R7; 3	PUK; R8; 4	PUK; R9; 3	**TAU**; **R10**; 2	**TAU**; **R11**; 9	TAU; R12; Ret	**HAM**; **R13**; 4	HAM; R14; 2	HAM; R15; Ret	HAM; R16; Ret	HAM; R17; 3	HAM; R18; 6	PUK; R19; 5	PUK; R20; 2	PUK; R21; 1	5th	2744

=== Complete Bathurst 12 Hour results ===
Year	Team	Co-drivers	Car	Class	Laps	Pos.	Class pos.
2016	(Australia) Grove Hire	(Australia) Stephen Grove (New Zealand) Earl Bamber	Porsche 911 GT3 Cup	Class B	285	12th	**1st**
2018	(Australia) YNA Autosport	(Australia) Fraser Ross (United Kingdom) Andrew Watson (Sweden) Alexander West	McLaren 650S GT3	APA	269	11th	5th

=== Scandinavian Touring Car Championship results ===
(key) (Races in bold indicate pole position) (Races in italics indicate fastest lap)

Year	Team	Car	1	2	3	4	5	6	7	8	9	10	11	12	13	14	DC	Points
2016	Polestar Cyan Racing	Volvo S60	SKÖ; 1; 2	SKÖ; 2 Ret	MAN; 1	MAN; 2	AND; 1	AND; 2	FAL; 1	FAL; 2	KAR; 1	KAR; 2	SOL; 1	SOL; 2	KNU; 1	KNU; 2	13th	36

=== American open–wheel racing results ===
(key)

==== IndyCar Series ====
(key)

Year	Team	No.	Chassis	Engine	1	2	3	4	5	6	7	8	9	10	11	12	13	14	15	16	17	18	Rank	Points	Ref
2020	Team Penske	3	Dallara DW12	Chevrolet	TXS	IMS	ROA	ROA	IOW	IOW	INDY	GTW	GTW	MOH	MOH	IMS	IMS	STP; 22					35th	8	
2021	Team Penske	3	Dallara DW12	Chevrolet	ALA; 14	STP; 11	TXS; 2	TXS; 8	IMS; 8	INDY; 20	DET; 19	DET; 20	ROA; 14	MOH; 12	NSH; 22	IMS; 23	GTW; 4	POR; 9	LAG; 12	LBH; 11			14th	305	
2022	Team Penske	3	Dallara DW12	Chevrolet	**STP**; 1*	TXS; 2*	LBH; 14	ALA; 6	IMS; 20	INDY; 29	DET; 19	ROA; 7	MOH; 1*	TOR; 9	IOW; 22	IOW; 3	IMS; 4	**NSH**; 2	GTW; 3	**POR**; 1*	LAG; 6		4th	510	
2023	Team Penske	3	Dallara DW12	Chevrolet	STP; 13*	TXS; 6	LBH; 10	ALA; 1	IMS; 16	INDY; 14	DET; 7	ROA; 8	MOH; 5	TOR; 6	IOW; 2	IOW; 5	**NSH**; 2	IMS; 8	**GTW**; 5	POR; 9	LAG; 2		3rd	488	
2024	Team Penske	3	Dallara DW12	Chevrolet	STP; 27	THE; 2	LBH; 26	**ALA**; 1*	IMS; 6	**INDY**; 6*	DET; 20	ROA; 3*	LAG; 21	MOH; 3	IOW; 1*	**IOW**; 3	TOR; 16	**GTW**; 2	POR; 7	**MIL**; 8	MIL; 1*	NSH; 5	3rd	505	
2025	Team Penske	3	Dallara DW12	Chevrolet	**STP**; 4*	THE; 27	LBH; 6	ALA; 3	IMS; 4	INDY; 30	DET; 12	GTW; 24	ROA; 12	MOH; 23	IOW; 4	IOW; 26	TOR; 26	LAG; 10	POR; 7	MIL; 3	NSH; 3		10th	356	
2026	Team Penske	3	Dallara DW12	Chevrolet	**STP**; 2	PHX; 8	ARL; 11	ALA; 16	LBH; 6	IMS; 16	INDY; 3	DET; 19	GTW; 5	ROA; 7	MOH; 16	NSH; 4	POR; 7	MRK; 8	WSH; 22	**MIL**; 4	MIL; 2	**LAG**; 1*	6th	483	

==== Indianapolis 500 ====
Year	Chassis	Engine	Start	Finish	Team
2021	Dallara	Chevrolet	17	20	Team Penske
2022	Dallara	Chevrolet	26	29	Team Penske
2023	Dallara	Chevrolet	14	14	Team Penske
2024	Dallara	Chevrolet	**1**	6	Team Penske
2025	Dallara	Chevrolet	10	30	Team Penske
2026	Dallara	Chevrolet	9	3	Team Penske

=== Complete IMSA SportsCar Championship results ===
(key) (Races in bold indicate pole position; results in italics indicate fastest lap)

Year	Team	Class	Make	Engine	1	2	3	4	5	6	7	8	9	10	Pos.	Points
2023	Tower Motorsports	LMP2	Oreca 07	Gibson GK428 4.2 L V8	DAY; 5†	**SEB**; 1	LGA	WGL	ELK	IMS	PET; 7				18th	639
2024	Tower Motorsports	LMP2	Oreca 07	Gibson GK428 4.2 L V8	DAY; 5	SEB	WGL	MOS	ELK	IMS	PET				44th	278
2025	Trackhouse by TF Sport	GTD Pro	Chevrolet Corvette Z06 GT3.R	Chevrolet LT6.R 5.5 L V8	DAY; 9	SEB	LGA	DET	WGL	MOS	ELK	VIR	IMS	PET	35th	243
2026	DXDT Racing	GTD	Chevrolet Corvette Z06 GT3.R	Chevrolet LT6.R 5.5 L V8	DAY; 17	SEB	LBH	LGA	WGL	MOS	ELK	VIR	IMS	PET	78th	168

^{†} Points only counted towards the Michelin Endurance Cup, and not the overall LMP2 Championship.

Sporting positions
Preceded by Andrew Thompson	Winner of the Dunlop V8 Supercar Series; 2012	Succeeded by Dale Wood
Preceded by none	Winner of the V8 SuperTourers Championship; 2012	Succeeded by Greg Murphy
Preceded by Jamie Whincup	Winner of the Supercars Championship; 2018, 2019 & 2020	Succeeded by Shane van Gisbergen
Preceded by Shane van Gisbergen	Winner of the Adelaide 500; 2019 & 2020	Succeeded by incumbent
Preceded by Craig Lowndes; Steven Richards	Winner of the Bathurst 1000; 2019 (with Alexandre Prémat)	Succeeded by Shane van Gisbergen; Garth Tander
Awards and achievements
Preceded by Scott Pye	Mike Kable Young Gun Award; 2013	Succeeded by Todd Hazelwood
Preceded by Craig Lowndes	Barry Sheene Medal; 2014	Succeeded by Craig Lowndes
Preceded by Craig Lowndes	Barry Sheene Medal; 2016	Succeeded by David Reynolds
Preceded by Jamie Whincup	Jason Richards Memorial Trophy; 2018	Succeeded by Shane van Gisbergen
Preceded by Shane van Gisbergen	Barry Sheene Medal; 2020	Succeeded by Jamie Whincup
Preceded by Patricio O'Ward	Indianapolis 500; Rookie of the Year; 2021	Succeeded by Jimmie Johnson
Preceded by Rinus VeeKay	IndyCar; Rookie of the Year; 2021	Succeeded by Christian Lundgaard
