= 2017 Winton SuperSprint =

2017 V8 Supercar championship race

(Victoria (state)) 2017 Winton SuperSprint
Event Information
- Round 5 of 14 in the 2017 International V8 Supercars Championship
- Date: 20–21 May 2017
- Location: Benalla, Victoria
- Venue: Winton Motor Raceway

Results
Race 1
Distance	40 laps	120 km
Pole position	(New Zealand) Scott McLaughlin; DJR Team Penske	1:19.3807
Winner	(New Zealand) Scott McLaughlin; DJR Team Penske	54:58.0578
Race 2
Distance	67 laps	200 km
Pole position	(New Zealand) Scott McLaughlin; DJR Team Penske	1:19.0721
Winner	(New Zealand) Shane van Gisbergen; Triple Eight Race Engineering	1:35:19.8233

The 2017 Winton SuperSprint was a motor racing event for the Supercars Championship, held on the weekend of 19 to 21 May 2017. The event was held at the Winton Motor Raceway near Benalla, Victoria and consisted of two races, 120 and 200 kilometres in length. It is the fifth event of fourteen in the 2017 Supercars Championship and hosted Races 9 and 10 of the season.

== Background ==
=== Driver changes ===
Taz Douglas returned to Lucas Dumbrell Motorsport having been replaced for the previous round by Matthew Brabham.

This was the second round in which Super2 Series wildcards were allowed to compete in the main class. Shae Davies, James Golding and Macauley Jones were the three drivers to step up for this round.
