= 2017 Supercars Championship =

Motor racing competition

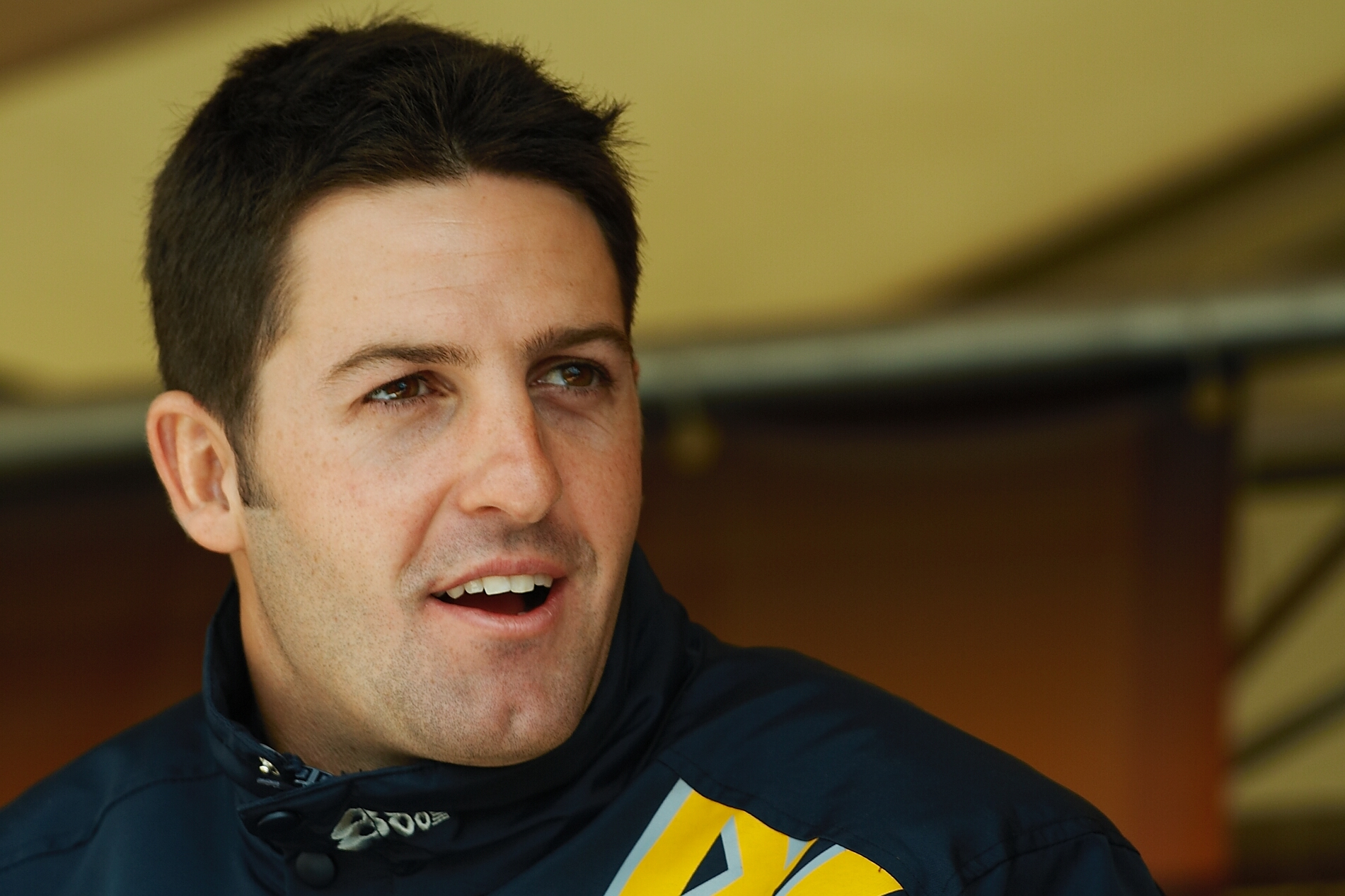
Jamie Whincup won his seventh drivers' championship title.

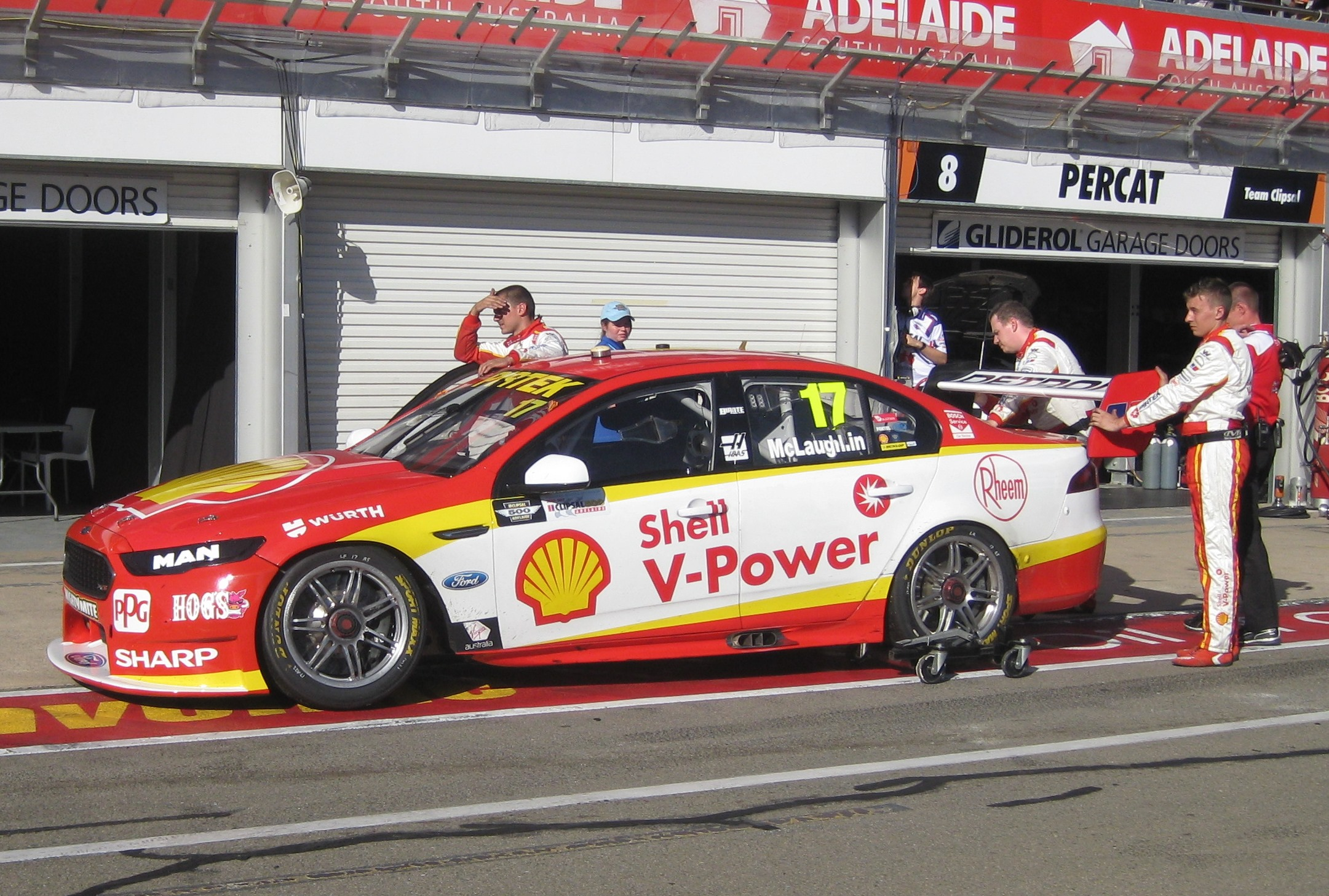
DJR Team Penske won its first Teams Championship in 2017.

The 2017 Supercars Championship (formally known as the 2017 Virgin Australia Supercars Championship) was an FIA-sanctioned international motor racing series for Supercars, which prior to July 2016 had been known as V8 Supercars. It was the nineteenth running of the Supercars Championship and the twenty-first series in which Supercars have contested the premier Australian touring car title.

The 2017 season saw the category undergo a substantial revision of its technical regulations, with the introduction of Gen 2 Supercar rules which opened the championship up to a wider range of body shapes and engine configurations. Despite this, all teams continued within the previous regulations.

DJR Team Penske was awarded the Teams Championship and Ford won the Manufacturers Championship. Jamie Whincup claimed his seventh title in controversial circumstances when Scott McLaughlin was penalized in the title-deciding race.

== Teams and drivers ==
Holden and Nissan were represented by factory-backed teams Triple Eight Race Engineering and Nissan Motorsport respectively.

The following teams and drivers competed in the 2017 championship.

Championship entries						Enduro Cup entries	
Manufacturer	Model	Team	No.	Driver name	Rounds	Co-driver name	Rounds
Ford	Falcon FG X	Prodrive Racing Australia	5	(Australia) Mark Winterbottom	All	(Australia) Dean Canto	10–12
Ford	Falcon FG X	Prodrive Racing Australia	6	(Australia) Cam Waters	All	(New Zealand) Richie Stanaway	10–12
Ford	Falcon FG X	DJR Team Penske	12	(New Zealand) Fabian Coulthard	All	(Australia) Tony D'Alberto	10–12
Ford	Falcon FG X	DJR Team Penske	17	(New Zealand) Scott McLaughlin	All	(France) Alexandre Prémat	10–12
Ford	Falcon FG X	Rod Nash Racing (PRA)	55	(Australia) Chaz Mostert	All	(Australia) Steve Owen	10–12
Ford	Falcon FG X	Britek Motorsport (PRA)	56	(Australia) Jason Bright	All	(Australia) Garry Jacobson	10–12
Holden	Commodore VF	Walkinshaw Racing	2	(Australia) Scott Pye	1–9	—N/a	
Holden	Commodore VF	Walkinshaw Racing	02	(Australia) Scott Pye	10–14	(Australia) Warren Luff	10–12
Holden	Commodore VF	Walkinshaw Racing	22	(Australia) James Courtney	All	(Australia) Jack Perkins	10–12
Holden	Commodore VF	Lucas Dumbrell Motorsport	3	(Australia) Taz Douglas	1–3, 5	—N/a	
Holden	Commodore VF	Lucas Dumbrell Motorsport	3	(Australia) Matthew Brabham	4	—N/a	
Holden	Commodore VF	Lucas Dumbrell Motorsport	3	(Australia) Cameron McConville	6	—N/a	
Holden	Commodore VF	Lucas Dumbrell Motorsport	3	(Australia) Aaren Russell	7, 10–14	(Australia) Taz Douglas	10–12
Holden	Commodore VF	Lucas Dumbrell Motorsport	3	(Australia) Alex Davison	8–9	—N/a	
Holden	Commodore VF	Lucas Dumbrell Motorsport	62	(Australia) Alex Rullo	1–12	(Australia) Alex Davison	10–12
Holden	Commodore VF	Lucas Dumbrell Motorsport	62	(Australia) Jack Perkins	13	—N/a	
Holden	Commodore VF	Lucas Dumbrell Motorsport	62	(Australia) Taz Douglas	14	—N/a	
Holden	Commodore VF	Brad Jones Racing	8	(Australia) Nick Percat	All	(Australia) Macauley Jones	10–12
Holden	Commodore VF	Brad Jones Racing	14	(Australia) Tim Slade	All	(Australia) Ash Walsh	10
Holden	Commodore VF	Brad Jones Racing	14	(Australia) Tim Slade	All	(New Zealand) Andre Heimgartner	11–12
Holden	Commodore VF	Erebus Motorsport	9	(Australia) David Reynolds	All	(Australia) Luke Youlden	10–12
Holden	Commodore VF	Erebus Motorsport	99	(Australia) Dale Wood	All	(New Zealand) Chris Pither	10–12
Holden	Commodore VF	Charlie Schwerkolt Racing	18	(Australia) Lee Holdsworth	All	(Australia) Karl Reindler	10–12
Holden	Commodore VF	Tekno Autosports	19	(Australia) Will Davison	All	(Australia) Jonathon Webb	10–12
Holden	Commodore VF	Tim Blanchard Racing (BJR)	21	(Australia) Tim Blanchard	All	(Australia) Todd Hazelwood	10–12
Holden	Commodore VF	Garry Rogers Motorsport	33	(Australia) Garth Tander	All	(Australia) James Golding	10–12
Holden	Commodore VF	Garry Rogers Motorsport	34	(Australia) James Moffat	All	(Australia) Richard Muscat	10–12
Holden	Commodore VF	Triple Eight Race Engineering	88	(Australia) Jamie Whincup	All	(Australia) Paul Dumbrell	10–12
Holden	Commodore VF	Triple Eight Race Engineering	97	(New Zealand) Shane van Gisbergen	All	(Australia) Matt Campbell	10–12
Holden	Commodore VF	Triple Eight Race Engineering	888	(Australia) Craig Lowndes	All	(New Zealand) Steven Richards	10–12
Nissan	Altima L33	Nissan Motorsport	7	(Australia) Todd Kelly	All	(Australia) Jack Le Brocq	10–12
Nissan	Altima L33	Nissan Motorsport	15	(Australia) Rick Kelly	All	(Australia) David Wall	10–12
Nissan	Altima L33	Nissan Motorsport	23	(Australia) Michael Caruso	All	(Australia) Dean Fiore	10–12
Nissan	Altima L33	Nissan Motorsport	78	(Switzerland) Simona de Silvestro	All	(Australia) David Russell	10–12
Wildcard entries
Holden	Commodore VF	Brad Jones Racing	4	(Australia) Macauley Jones	5–6	—N/a	
Holden	Commodore VF	Garry Rogers Motorsport	31	(Australia) James Golding	5, 8	—N/a	
Holden	Commodore VF	Matt Stone Racing	35	(Australia) Todd Hazelwood	8	—N/a	
Nissan	Altima L33	MW Motorsport	26	(Australia) Shae Davies	5, 8	—N/a	
Nissan	Altima L33	MW Motorsport	28	(Australia) Jack Le Brocq	6, 8	—N/a	

=== Team changes ===
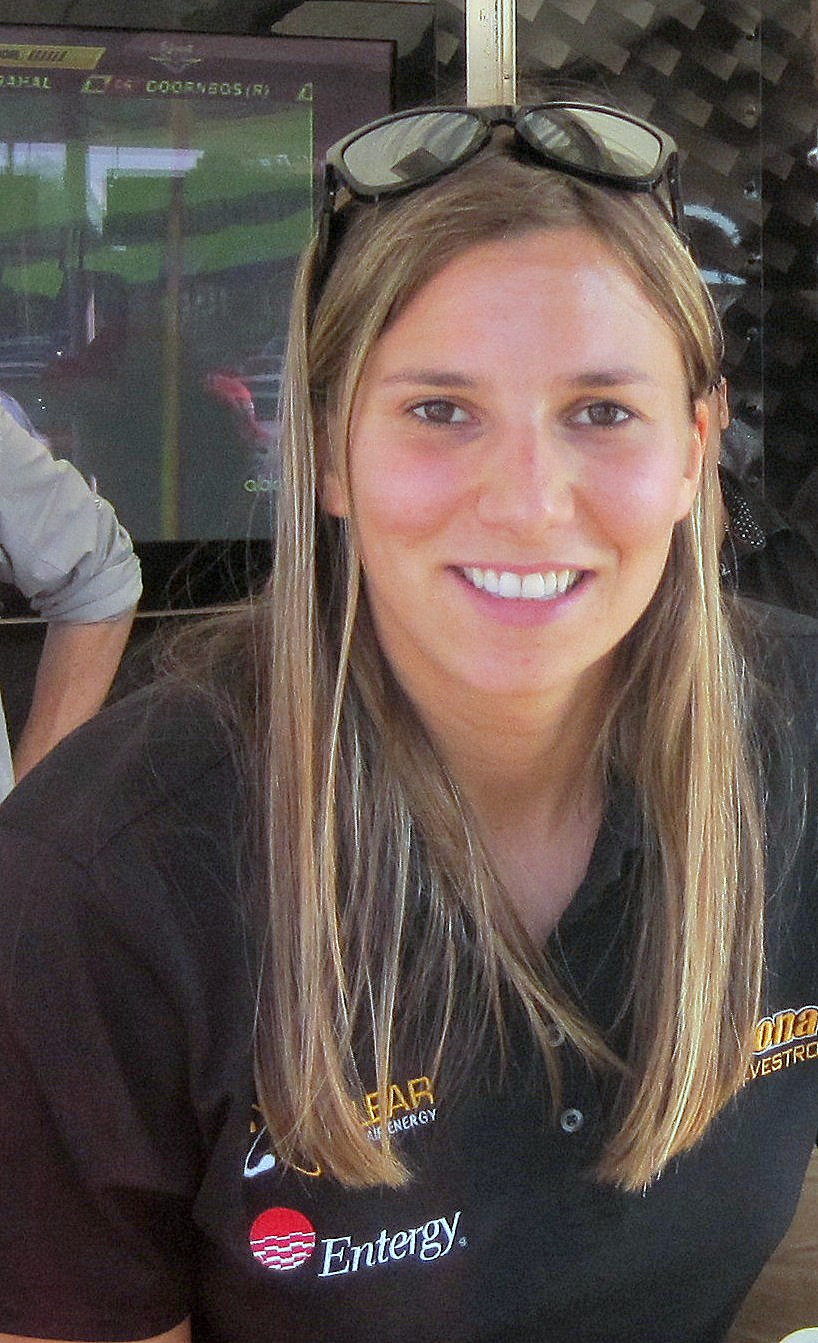
Simona de Silvestro became the first female driver in 19 years to compete in the series full-time.

Jason Bright moved his Britek Motorsport Racing Entitlement Contract (REC) from Brad Jones Racing to Prodrive Racing Australia.

Super Black Racing shut down at the end of 2016, with its REC sold to Prodrive Racing Australia co-owner, Rusty French, who on-sold it to Tim Blanchard Racing.

Triple Eight Race Engineering became the official Holden factory team. Walkinshaw Racing, which competed as the factory Holden Racing Team from 1990 to 2016, became a customer Holden team instead.

Volvo withdrew from the series at the end of the 2016 season. Garry Rogers Motorsport returned to using Holden Commodores, as it had done prior to switching to Volvo in 2014.

=== Driver changes ===
Jason Bright moved from Brad Jones Racing to drive for his Britek Motorsport team in a Prodrive Racing Australia-prepared car. Bright last drove for Prodrive, then known as Ford Performance Racing, in 2005 and 2006 under his Britek REC. Nick Percat moved from Lucas Dumbrell Motorsport to replace Bright.

Matt Chahda was scheduled to make his Supercars début with Lucas Dumbrell Motorsport, but his application for a racing licence was refused by the Confederation of Australian Motor Sport. Taz Douglas instead drove for Lucas Dumbrell Motorsport for the first three events of the season.

Alex Rullo became the youngest Supercars driver in the series' history when he made his début for Lucas Dumbrell Motorsport at the Adelaide 500.

Shae Davies left Erebus Motorsport to return to the Dunlop Super2 Series. He was replaced by Dale Wood, who moved from Nissan Motorsport.

Simona de Silvestro joined the championship with Nissan Motorsport, replacing Wood. Having contested the 2015 and 2016 Bathurst 1000 events, de Silvestro was the first female driver to contest the full championship since Melinda Price and Kerryn Brewer in 1998.

Scott McLaughlin moved from Garry Rogers Motorsport to DJR Team Penske, replacing Scott Pye. Pye then moved to Walkinshaw Racing, replacing Garth Tander. Tander would end up at Garry Rogers Motorsport, having previously driven for the team between 1998 and 2004.

Chris Pither lost his seat at Super Black Racing after the team shut down, he later returned as an endurance co-driver with Erebus Motorsport.

=== Mid-season changes ===
Taz Douglas was unable to contest the fourth event of the championship at Barbagallo Raceway. He was replaced by former IndyCar Series and United States Auto Club driver Matthew Brabham. He returned for the Enduro Cup and the Newcastle 500

Cameron McConville returned to Lucas Dumbrell Motorsport for the Darwin Triple Crown.

Aaren Russell returned to Lucas Dumbrell Motorsport for the Townsville, Pukekohe and Newcastle rounds of the series. As well as the Enduro Cup rounds

Alex Davison drove for Lucas Dumbrell Motorsport at the Ipswich and Sydney Motorsport Park events, as well as in the Enduro Cup rounds.

Ash Walsh was scheduled to drive with Tim Slade in all three endurance races however after sustaining injuries while testing another car, was forced to withdraw from the Bathurst 1000 and was replaced by Andre Heimgartner. Heimgartner also drove for the team at the Gold Coast 600.

Alex Rullo's contract was terminated by Lucas Dumbrell Motorsport after the Gold Coast 600. He was replaced by Super2 Series driver Jack Perkins.

=== Wildcard entries ===
Five wildcard entries were granted, allowing Brad Jones Racing and Garry Rogers Motorsport to enter their endurance drivers Macauley Jones and James Golding at Winton, with Jones returning for Darwin and Golding at Ipswich. Todd Hazelwood would also drive a Matt Stone Racing wildcard at Ipswich.

MW Motorsport elected to run their Nissan Altimas as wildcards for Shae Davies at Winton and Ipswich and Jack Le Brocq at Darwin and Ipswich respectively.

== Calendar ==
The following fourteen events were scheduled for 2017:

Event	Event name	Circuit	Location	Date
1	(South Australia) Adelaide 500	Adelaide Street Circuit	Adelaide, South Australia	4–5 March
2	Tasmania SuperSprint	Symmons Plains Raceway	Launceston, Tasmania	8–9 April
3	(Victoria (state)) Phillip Island 500	Phillip Island Grand Prix Circuit	Phillip Island, Victoria	22–23 April
4	(Western Australia) Perth SuperSprint	Barbagallo Raceway	Perth, Western Australia	6–7 May
5	(Victoria (state)) Winton SuperSprint	Winton Motor Raceway	Winton, Victoria	20–21 May
6	(Northern Territory) Darwin Triple Crown	Hidden Valley Raceway	Darwin, Northern Territory	17–18 June
7	(Queensland) Townsville 400	Reid Park Street Circuit	Townsville, Queensland	8–9 July
8	(Queensland) Ipswich SuperSprint	Queensland Raceway	Ipswich, Queensland	29–30 July
9	(New South Wales) Sydney SuperSprint	Sydney Motorsport Park	Eastern Creek, New South Wales	19–20 August
10	(Victoria (state)) Sandown 500	Sandown Raceway	Melbourne, Victoria	17 September
11	(New South Wales) Bathurst 1000	Mount Panorama Circuit	Bathurst, New South Wales	8 October
12	(Queensland) Gold Coast 600	Surfers Paradise Street Circuit	Surfers Paradise, Queensland	21–22 October
13	(New Zealand) Auckland SuperSprint	Pukekohe Park Raceway	Pukekohe, New Zealand	4–5 November
14	(New South Wales) Newcastle 500	Newcastle Street Circuit	Newcastle, New South Wales	25–26 November

Australian rounds
New Zealand rounds

=== Calendar changes ===
- The Sydney 500—which was held at the Homebush Street Circuit from 2009 to 2016—was replaced by a new event, the Newcastle 500. The event was held on a street circuit in the East End of Newcastle, and was run to the SuperStreet format, featuring two races of 250 kilometres.

=== Format changes ===
- The Adelaide 500 returned to its original format of two races of 250 kilometres, which was last used in 2013. Event organisers cited the unpopularity of the format used between 2014 and 2016—two races of 125 km followed by one 250 km race—as the reason for the change. The top ten shootout was also re-introduced for qualifying for the Saturday race.
- The Phillip Island 500 consisted of two races of 250 km.
- The Auckland SuperSprint adopted a new format, with its four 100 km races being replaced with two races of 200 km, both including mandatory pit stops.

== Rule changes ==
=== Gen 2 ===
The 2017 season saw the introduction of Gen 2 Supercar regulations. Two-door coupé body styles are permitted alongside four-door sedans, while the engine regulations were opened up to include turbocharged four or six-cylinder engines. However, cars are still be required to be based on front-engined, rear wheel drive, four-seater production cars that are sold in Australia. The chassis and control components carried over from the New Generation V8 Supercar regulations used since 2013. However all teams are continuing to use New Generation specification cars until the beginning of 2018 when the Holden Commodore ZB built to the new specifications will debut.

Two new control Dunlop tyres were introduced, marking the first change in tyre construction since 2003. Whereas in previous seasons, the two compounds were designated hard and soft, in 2017 these are named soft and super soft respectively. All teams attended a test session on 21 February 2017 at Sydney Motorsport Park to evaluate the new tyre.

=== Technical changes ===
Starting in 2017, drivers must earn a racing licence sanctioned by the Confederation of Australian Motorsport (CAMS) in order to be eligible to compete in the category. The licence system was restructured similarly to the Superlicence used in Formula One, with drivers earning points towards their licence by placing in feeder series accredited by CAMS. This system drew controversy almost immediately because it is based on CAMS series. Some international drivers needed special exemptions to participate, most notably Matthew Brabham, for whom most of his career was sanctioned by ACCUS member sanctioning bodies, and not CAMS.

Teams from Supercars' support category, the Dunlop Super2 Series are allowed to compete as wildcards in the main series in five events of the 2017 season, at Barbagallo, Winton, Hidden Valley, Ipswich and Bathurst. The 250-kilometre race held specifically for the Super2 Series at Bathurst will also become a non-championship round, to encourage more applicants.

The redress rules—outlining the expectations of drivers following on-track contact—were changed for 2017. Drivers deemed responsible for contact are no longer required to return a position to the driver or drivers they hit, but redress instead is voluntary, with drivers who voluntarily return a position being given more favourable treatment than drivers who do not when the incident is reviewed by race officials. The change was introduced following a controversial incident at the 2016 Bathurst 1000 in which Jamie Whincup tried to redress a position to Scott McLaughlin as required by the rules without losing another position to Garth Tander; the subsequent collision saw McLaughlin and Tander collide with Tander retiring from the race.

== Results and standings ==
=== Season summary ===
Round	Race	Event	Pole position	Fastest lap	Winning driver	Winning team	Report
1	1	Adelaide 500	(New Zealand) Shane van Gisbergen	(New Zealand) Shane van Gisbergen	(New Zealand) Shane van Gisbergen	Triple Eight Race Engineering	Report
1	2	Adelaide 500	(New Zealand) Shane van Gisbergen	(New Zealand) Scott McLaughlin	(New Zealand) Shane van Gisbergen	Triple Eight Race Engineering	Report
2	3	Tasmania SuperSprint	(New Zealand) Scott McLaughlin	(Australia) Chaz Mostert	(New Zealand) Shane van Gisbergen	Triple Eight Race Engineering (Note: Race 3 was shortened when an accident involving multiple cars forced an extended race stoppage. As a result, no points were awarded.)	Report
2	4	Tasmania SuperSprint	(Australia) Jamie Whincup	(Australia) Craig Lowndes	(New Zealand) Fabian Coulthard	DJR Team Penske	Report
3	5	Phillip Island 500	(New Zealand) Scott McLaughlin	(New Zealand) Scott McLaughlin	(New Zealand) Fabian Coulthard (Note: Craig Lowndes finished the race in first position, but was demoted to twelfth when fifteen seconds were added to his race time for a pit lane violation.)	DJR Team Penske	Report
3	6	Phillip Island 500	(New Zealand) Scott McLaughlin	(New Zealand) Scott McLaughlin	(Australia) Chaz Mostert	Rod Nash Racing	Report
4	7	Perth SuperSprint	(New Zealand) Fabian Coulthard	(Australia) Nick Percat	(New Zealand) Scott McLaughlin	DJR Team Penske	Report
4	8	Perth SuperSprint	(New Zealand) Scott McLaughlin	(New Zealand) Fabian Coulthard	(New Zealand) Scott McLaughlin	DJR Team Penske	Report
5	9	Winton SuperSprint	(New Zealand) Scott McLaughlin	(Australia) David Reynolds	(New Zealand) Scott McLaughlin	DJR Team Penske	Report
5	10	Winton SuperSprint	(New Zealand) Scott McLaughlin	(New Zealand) Shane van Gisbergen	(New Zealand) Shane van Gisbergen	Triple Eight Race Engineering	Report
6	11	Darwin Triple Crown	(Australia) Rick Kelly	(Australia) James Moffat	(New Zealand) Fabian Coulthard	DJR Team Penske	Report
6	12	Darwin Triple Crown	(New Zealand) Scott McLaughlin	(New Zealand) Scott McLaughlin	(New Zealand) Scott McLaughlin	DJR Team Penske	Report
7	13	Townsville 400	(New Zealand) Scott McLaughlin	(New Zealand) Scott McLaughlin	(New Zealand) Scott McLaughlin	DJR Team Penske	Report
7	14	Townsville 400	(New Zealand) Scott McLaughlin	(Australia) Nick Percat	(Australia) Jamie Whincup	Triple Eight Race Engineering	Report
8	15	Ipswich SuperSprint	(New Zealand) Scott McLaughlin	(Australia) James Courtney	(New Zealand) Scott McLaughlin	DJR Team Penske	Report
8	16	Ipswich SuperSprint	(New Zealand) Scott McLaughlin	(New Zealand) Scott McLaughlin	(Australia) Chaz Mostert	Rod Nash Racing	Report
9	17	Sydney SuperSprint	(New Zealand) Scott McLaughlin	(Australia) Nick Percat	(New Zealand) Fabian Coulthard	DJR Team Penske	Report
9	18	Sydney SuperSprint	(New Zealand) Scott McLaughlin	(Australia) Chaz Mostert	(Australia) Jamie Whincup	Triple Eight Race Engineering	Report
10	19	Sandown 500	(Australia) Cam Waters (New Zealand) Richie Stanaway	(Australia) Chaz Mostert	(Australia) Cam Waters (New Zealand) Richie Stanaway	Prodrive Racing Australia	Report
11	20	Bathurst 1000	(New Zealand) Scott McLaughlin	(Australia) David Reynolds	(Australia) David Reynolds (Australia) Luke Youlden	Erebus Motorsport	Report
12	21	Gold Coast 600	(Australia) Chaz Mostert	(Australia) Chaz Mostert	(Australia) Chaz Mostert (Australia) Steve Owen	Rod Nash Racing	Report
12	22	Gold Coast 600	(New Zealand) Shane van Gisbergen	(New Zealand) Shane van Gisbergen	(New Zealand) Scott McLaughlin (France) Alexandre Prémat	DJR Team Penske	Report
13	23	Auckland SuperSprint	(Australia) Cam Waters (Note: Qualifying for Race 23 was suspended due to heavy rain and the session could not be re-started. The grid was set based on the drivers' fastest laps during free practice.)	(New Zealand) Scott McLaughlin	(New Zealand) Shane van Gisbergen	Triple Eight Race Engineering	Report
13	24	Auckland SuperSprint	(Australia) Jamie Whincup	(Australia) Jamie Whincup	(Australia) Jamie Whincup	Triple Eight Race Engineering	Report
14	25	Newcastle 500	(New Zealand) Scott McLaughlin	(Australia) Jamie Whincup	(New Zealand) Scott McLaughlin	DJR Team Penske	Report
14	26	Newcastle 500	(New Zealand) Scott McLaughlin	(Australia) David Reynolds	(Australia) Jamie Whincup	Triple Eight Race Engineering	Report

=== Points system ===
Points were awarded for each race at an event, to the driver or drivers of a car that completed at least 75% of the race distance and was running at the completion of the race, up to a maximum of 300 points per event.

Points format	Position																													
Points format	1st	2nd	3rd	4th	5th	6th	7th	8th	9th	10th	11th	12th	13th	14th	15th	16th	17th	18th	19th	20th	21st	22nd	23rd	24th	25th	26th	27th	28th	29th	30th
Standard format	150	138	129	120	111	102	96	90	84	78	72	69	66	63	60	57	54	51	48	45	42	39	36	33	30	27	24	21	18	15
Endurance format	300	276	258	240	222	204	192	180	168	156	144	138	132	126	120	114	108	102	96	90	84	78	72	66	60	54				

- Standard format: Used for all SuperSprint and SuperStreet races and for both races of the Gold Coast 600.
- Endurance format: Used for the Sandown 500 and Bathurst 1000.

=== Drivers' championship ===
Pos.	Driver	No.	ADE (South Australia)		SYM (Tasmania)		PHI (Victoria (state))		BAR (Western Australia)		WIN (Victoria (state))		HID (Northern Territory)		TOW (Queensland)		QLD (Queensland)		SMP (New South Wales)		**SAN** **(Victoria (state))**	**BAT** **(New South Wales)**	**SUR** **(Queensland)**		PUK (New Zealand)		NEW (New South Wales)		Pen.	Pts.
1	(Australia) Jamie Whincup	88	6	6	2	**3**	2	18	3	3	2	2	4	2	2	1	20	4	3	1	6	20	6	2	4	**1**	21	1	0	3042
2	(New Zealand) Scott McLaughlin	17	17	2	**14**	2	**10**	**14**	1	**1**	**1**	**5**	2	**1**	**1**	**2**	**1**	**2**	**21**	**4**	2	**Ret**	12	1	3	2	**1**	**18**	0	3021
3	(New Zealand) Fabian Coulthard	12	2	5	11	1	1	17	**2**	7	3	3	1	4	10	21	6	5	1	2	5	3	19	9	Ret	5	2	Ret	35	2812
4	(New Zealand) Shane van Gisbergen	97	**1**	**1**	1	9	4	16	4	6	8	1	Ret	3	7	3	3	3	23	3	15	5	4	**3**	1	24	16	2	0	2769
5	(Australia) Chaz Mostert	55	9	3	5	7	11	1	6	2	Ret	8	5	17	4	5	2	1	2	5	3	10	**1**	7	23	7	6	15	0	2748
6	(Australia) Mark Winterbottom	5	15	14	7	13	8	2	5	4	9	13	14	14	3	4	9	10	4	19	9	Ret	8	5	2	19	17	7	0	2208
7	(Australia) David Reynolds	9	18	12	4	5	Ret	3	9	16	4	7	8	7	9	11	10	9	8	9	17	1	17	Ret	24	13	5	3	0	2196
8	(Australia) Cam Waters	6	4	8	10	6	19	6	19	12	22	4	6	9	5	14	16	8	17	Ret	**1**	16	2	21	**9**	3	13	23	35	2173
9	(Australia) Garth Tander	33	12	11	Ret	10	3	7	10	9	7	6	26	16	8	6	11	15	9	11	4	18	13	17	7	6	11	12	0	2169
10	(Australia) Craig Lowndes	888	8	10	3	4	12	23	7	8	6	15	7	6	6	10	5	6	7	24	11	11	7	4	8	4	Ret	Ret	15	2160
11	(Australia) Tim Slade	14	14	7	Ret	8	18	19	13	17	27	11	11	5	20	Ret	4	7	18	17	DSQ	9	3	22	6	15	3	11	0	1812
12	(Australia) Scott Pye	2/02	16	19	Ret	12	17	12	20	14	14	22	22	8	12	18	13	16	5	18	21	2	11	13	14	10	7	14	35	1804
13	(Australia) Michael Caruso	23	11	22	13	16	5	10	18	19	13	Ret	16	19	15	13	15	Ret	6	7	20	6	5	15	17	11	14	5	0	1776
14	(Australia) Rick Kelly	15	5	17	Ret	DNS	16	9	14	15	15	14	**Ret**	10	17	12	8	13	11	20	14	13	10	11	11	12	10	4	0	1773
15	(Australia) Will Davison	19	Ret	13	Ret	DNS	9	Ret	8	5	5	9	13	11	19	8	17	Ret	12	12	12	14	20	14	12	23	9	9	0	1659
16	(Australia) Lee Holdsworth	18	13	18	12	17	22	5	15	20	11	10	10	12	11	15	12	20	15	15	8	Ret	Ret	8	10	Ret	4	8	0	1647
17	(Australia) James Moffat	34	10	16	Ret	19	14	4	12	11	19	16	9	25	13	7	28	14	DSQ	14	7	Ret	18	19	13	9	Ret	13	0	1542
18	(Australia) Todd Kelly	7	22	9	9	18	6	11	11	18	12	17	18	20	Ret	17	18	12	25	10	16	7	Ret	12	15	18	15	10	60	1536
19	(Australia) Nick Percat	8	7	Ret	Ret	11	Ret	21	22	10	10	12	3	15	24	16	7	24	24	6	22	Ret	21	10	16	14	8	6	0	1527
20	(Australia) Jason Bright	56	21	15	6	Ret	7	25	16	13	26	18	15	13	23	19	Ret	11	13	8	19	8	9	16	5	8	Ret	22	0	1524
21	(Australia) James Courtney	22	3	4	Ret	DNS	21	20	17	22	Ret	19	21	18	25	9	14	23	14	16	10	19	14	6	25	Ret	19	24	0	1431
22	(Australia) Tim Blanchard	21	19	21	Ret	Ret	15	15	26	23	17	21	12	21	14	20	21	17	10	13	DNS	12	15	20	19	16	12	16	0	1302
23	(Australia) Dale Wood	99	Ret	20	8	14	Ret	8	21	21	21	26	25	27	16	22	23	Ret	16	22	13	4	22	18	20	20	18	20	60	1221
24	(Switzerland) Simona de Silvestro	78	20	23	15	15	13	13	23	24	23	20	20	28	18	23	27	19	19	23	18	Ret	16	23	18	17	20	17	0	1131
25	(Australia) Steve Owen	55																			3	10	1	7					0	660
26	(Australia) James Golding	31/33									16	25					24	21			4	18	13	17					0	624
27	(Australia) Tony D'Alberto	12																			5	3	19	9					0	612
28	(New Zealand) Richie Stanaway	6																			**1**	16	2	21					0	594
29	(Australia) Alex Rullo	62	23	25	Ret	Ret	Ret	22	24	25	25	27	23	23	21	24	Ret	25	22	Ret	Ret	15	23	Ret					0	594
30	(Australia) Matt Campbell	97																			15	5	4	3					0	591
31	(Australia) Paul Dumbrell	88																			6	20	6	2					0	534
32	(New Zealand) Steven Richards	888																			11	11	7	4					0	504
33	(Australia) Warren Luff	02																			21	2	11	13					0	498
34	(France) Alexandre Prémat	17																			2	Ret	12	1					0	495
35	(Australia) Jack Perkins	22/62																			10	19	14	6	22	22			0	495
36	(Australia) Jack Le Brocq	28/7											19	22			19	Ret			16	7	Ret	12					25	485
37	(Australia) Dean Fiore	23																			20	6	5	15					0	465
38	(Australia) Luke Youlden	9																			17	1	17	Ret					0	462
39	(New Zealand) Chris Pither	99																			13	4	22	18					0	462
40	(Australia) Garry Jacobson	56																			19	8	9	16					0	417
41	(Australia) David Wall	15																			14	13	10	11					0	408
42	(Australia) Jonathan Webb	19																			12	14	20	14					0	372
43	(Australia) Dean Canto	5																			9	Ret	8	5					0	369
44	(Australia) Taz Douglas	3/62	24	24	Ret	DNS	20	24			24	28									Ret	17	Ret	Ret			Ret	21	0	348
45	(Australia) Macauley Jones	4/8									20	23	24	24							22	Ret	21	10					0	345
46	(New Zealand) Andre Heimgartner	14																				9	3	22					0	336
47	(Australia) Todd Hazelwood	35/21/4															22	18			DNS	12	15	20					0	333
48	(Australia) Aaren Russell	3													22	25					Ret	17	Ret	Ret	21	21	Ret	19	0	309
49	(Australia) Alex Davison	3/62															26	26	20	21	Ret	15	23	Ret					0	297
50	(Australia) Richard Muscat	34																			7	Ret	18	19					0	291
51	(Australia) Karl Reindler	18																			8	Ret	Ret	8					0	270
52	(Australia) David Russell	78																			18	Ret	16	23					0	195
53	(Australia) Shae Davies	26									18	24					25	22											0	153
54	(Australia) Cameron McConville	3											17	26															0	81
55	(Australia) Matthew Brabham	3							25	26																			0	57
56	(Australia) Ashley Walsh	14																			DSQ	WD							0	0
Pos.	Driver	No.	ADE (South Australia)		SYM (Tasmania)		PHI (Victoria (state))		BAR (Western Australia)		WIN (Victoria (state))		HID (Northern Territory)		TOW (Queensland)		QLD (Queensland)		SMP (New South Wales)		**SAN** **(Victoria (state))**	**BAT** **(New South Wales)**	**SUR** **(Queensland)**		PUK (New Zealand)		NEW (New South Wales)		Pen.	Pts.

Colour	Result
Gold	Winner
Silver	Second place
Bronze	Third place
Green	Points classification
Blue	Non-points classification
Blue	Non-classified finish (NC)
Purple	Retired, not classified (Ret)
Red	Did not qualify (DNQ)
Red	Did not pre-qualify (DNPQ)
Black	Disqualified (DSQ)
White	Did not start (DNS)
White	Withdrew (WD)
White	Race cancelled (C)
Blank	Did not practice (DNP)
Blank	Did not arrive (DNA)
Blank	Excluded (EX)

Bold - Pole position

Italics - Fastest lap

Results count toward the Enduro Cup.

=== Teams' championship ===
Pos.	Team	No.	ADE (South Australia)		SYM (Tasmania)		PHI (Victoria (state))		BAR (Western Australia)		WIN (Victoria (state))		HID (Northern Territory)		TOW (Queensland)		QLD (Queensland)		SMP (New South Wales)		**SAN** **(Victoria (state))**	**BAT** **(New South Wales)**	**SUR** **(Queensland)**		PUK (New Zealand)		NEW (New South Wales)		Pen.	Pts.
1	DJR Team Penske	12	2	5	11	1	1	17	**2**	7	3	3	1	4	10	21	6	5	1	2	5	3	19	9	Ret	5	2	Ret	0	5868
1	DJR Team Penske	17	17	2	**14**	2	**10**	**14**	1	**1**	**1**	**5**	2	**1**	**1**	**2**	**1**	**2**	**21**	**4**	2	**Ret**	12	1	3	2	**1**	**18**	0	5868
2	Triple Eight Race Engineering	88	6	6	2	**3**	2	18	3	3	2	2	4	2	2	1	20	4	3	1	6	20	6	2	4	**1**	21	1	0	5811
2	Triple Eight Race Engineering	97	**1**	**1**	1	9	4	16	4	6	8	1	Ret	3	7	3	3	3	23	3	15	5	4	**3**	1	24	16	2	0	5811
3	Prodrive Racing Australia	5	15	14	7	13	8	2	5	4	9	13	14	14	3	4	9	10	4	19	9	Ret	8	5	2	19	17	7	0	4416
3	Prodrive Racing Australia	6	4	8	10	6	19	6	19	12	22	4	6	9	5	14	16	8	17	Ret	**1**	16	2	21	**9**	3	13	23	0	4416
4	Garry Rogers Motorsport	33	12	11	Ret	10	3	7	10	9	7	6	26	16	8	6	11	15	9	11	4	18	13	17	7	6	11	12	0	3711
4	Garry Rogers Motorsport	34	10	16	Ret	19	14	4	12	11	19	16	9	25	13	7	28	14	DSQ	14	7	Ret	18	19	13	9	Ret	13	0	3711
5	Erebus Motorsport	9	18	12	4	5	Ret	3	9	16	4	7	8	7	9	11	10	9	8	9	17	1	17	Ret	24	13	5	3	0	3477
5	Erebus Motorsport	99	Ret	20	8	14	Ret	8	21	21	21	26	25	27	16	22	23	Ret	16	22	13	4	22	18	20	20	18	20	0	3477
6	Nissan Motorsport	7	22	9	9	18	6	11	11	18	12	17	18	20	Ret	17	18	12	25	10	16	7	Ret	12	15	18	15	10	84	3285
6	Nissan Motorsport	15	5	17	Ret	DNS	16	9	14	15	15	14	**Ret**	10	17	12	8	13	11	20	14	13	10	11	11	12	10	4	84	3285
7	Walkinshaw Racing	2/02	16	19	Ret	12	17	12	20	14	14	22	22	8	12	18	13	16	5	18	21	2	11	13	14	10	7	14	0	3270
7	Walkinshaw Racing	22	3	4	Ret	DNS	21	20	17	22	Ret	19	21	18	25	9	14	23	14	16	10	19	14	6	25	Ret	19	24	0	3270
8	Brad Jones Racing	8	7	Ret	Ret	11	Ret	21	22	10	10	12	3	15	24	16	7	24	24	6	22	Ret	21	10	16	14	8	6	96	3243
8	Brad Jones Racing	14	14	7	Ret	8	18	19	13	17	27	11	11	5	20	Ret	4	7	18	17	DSQ	9	3	22	6	15	3	11	96	3243
9	Nissan Motorsport	23	11	22	13	16	5	10	18	19	13	Ret	16	19	15	13	15	Ret	6	7	20	6	5	15	17	11	14	5	0	2907
9	Nissan Motorsport	78	20	23	15	15	13	13	23	24	23	20	20	28	18	23	27	19	19	23	18	Ret	16	23	18	17	20	17	0	2907
10	Rod Nash Racing	55	9	3	5	7	11	1	6	2	Ret	8	5	17	4	5	2	1	2	5	3	10	**1**	7	23	7	6	15	0	2748
11	Triple Eight Race Engineering	888	8	10	3	4	12	23	7	8	6	15	7	6	6	10	5	6	7	24	11	11	7	4	8	4	Ret	Ret	0	2175
12	Tekno Autosports	19	Ret	13	Ret	DNS	9	Ret	8	5	5	9	13	11	19	8	17	Ret	12	12	12	14	20	14	12	23	9	9	0	1659
13	Team 18	18	13	18	12	17	22	5	15	20	11	10	10	12	11	15	12	20	15	15	8	Ret	Ret	8	10	Ret	4	8	0	1647
14	Britek Motorsport	56	21	15	6	Ret	7	25	16	13	26	18	15	13	23	19	Ret	11	13	8	19	8	9	16	5	8	Ret	22	0	1524
15	Lucas Dumbrell Motorsport	3	24	24	Ret	DNS	20	24	25	26	24	28	17	26	22	25	26	26	22	25	Ret	17	Ret	Ret	21	21	Ret	19	30	1470
15	Lucas Dumbrell Motorsport	62	23	25	Ret	Ret	Ret	22	24	25	25	27	23	23	21	24	Ret	25	22	Ret	Ret	15	23	Ret	22	22	Ret	21	30	1470
16	Tim Blanchard Racing	21	19	21	Ret	Ret	15	15	26	23	17	21	12	21	14	20	21	17	10	13	DNS	12	15	20	19	16	12	16	0	1302
Pos.	Team	No.	ADE (South Australia)		SYM (Tasmania)		PHI (Victoria (state))		BAR (Western Australia)		WIN (Victoria (state))		HID (Northern Territory)		TOW (Queensland)		QLD (Queensland)		SMP (New South Wales)		**SAN** **(Victoria (state))**	**BAT** **(New South Wales)**	**SUR** **(Queensland)**		PUK (New Zealand)		NEW (New South Wales)		Pen.	Pts.

Colour	Result
Gold	Winner
Silver	Second place
Bronze	Third place
Green	Points classification
Blue	Non-points classification
Blue	Non-classified finish (NC)
Purple	Retired, not classified (Ret)
Red	Did not qualify (DNQ)
Red	Did not pre-qualify (DNPQ)
Black	Disqualified (DSQ)
White	Did not start (DNS)
White	Withdrew (WD)
White	Race cancelled (C)
Blank	Did not practice (DNP)
Blank	Did not arrive (DNA)
Blank	Excluded (EX)

Bold - Pole position
Italics - Fastest lap

=== Enduro Cup ===
Pos.	Drivers	No.	**SAN** **(Victoria (state))**	**BAT** **(New South Wales)**	**SUR** **(Queensland)**		Pen.	Pts.
1	Chaz Mostert / Steve Owen	55	3	10	**1**	7	0	660
2	Fabian Coulthard / Tony D'Alberto	12	5	3	19	9	0	612
3	Cam Waters / Richie Stanaway	6	**1**	16	2	21	0	594
4	Shane van Gisbergen / Matt Campbell	97	15	5	4	**3**	0	591
5	Jamie Whincup / Paul Dumbrell	88	6	20	6	2	0	534
6	Craig Lowndes / Steven Richards	888	11	11	7	4	0	504
7	Scott Pye / Warren Luff	02	21	2	11	13	0	498
8	Scott McLaughlin / Alexandre Prémat	17	2	**Ret**	12	1	0	495
9	Michael Caruso / Dean Fiore	23	20	6	5	15	0	465
10	David Reynolds / Luke Youlden	9	17	1	17	Ret	0	462
11	Dale Wood / Chris Pither	99	13	4	22	18	0	462
12	Garth Tander / James Golding	33	4	18	13	17	0	462
13	Jason Bright / Garry Jacobson	56	19	8	9	16	0	417
14	James Courtney / Jack Perkins	22	10	19	14	6	0	417
15	Rick Kelly / David Wall	15	14	13	10	11	0	408
16	Todd Kelly / Jack Le Brocq	7	16	7	Ret	12	0	375
17	Will Davison / Jonathon Webb	19	12	14	20	14	0	372
18	Mark Winterbottom / Dean Canto	5	9	Ret	8	5	0	369
19	Tim Slade / Andre Heimgartner	14		9	3	22	0	336
20	James Moffat / Richard Muscat	34	7	Ret	18	19	0	291
21	Lee Holdsworth / Karl Reindler	18	8	Ret	16	23	0	270
22	Tim Blanchard / Todd Hazelwood	21	DNS	12	15	20	0	243
23	Simona de Silvestro / David Russell	78	18	Ret	16	23	0	198
24	Nick Percat / Macauley Jones	8	22	Ret	21	10	0	198
25	Alex Rullo / Alex Davison	62	Ret	15	23	Ret	0	156
26	Aaren Russell / Taz Douglas	3	Ret	17	Ret	Ret	0	108
27	Tim Slade / Ashley Walsh	14	DSQ	WD			0	0
Pos.	Drivers	No.	**SAN** **(Victoria (state))**	**BAT** **(New South Wales)**	**SUR** **(Queensland)**		Pen.	Pts.

Colour	Result
Gold	Winner
Silver	Second place
Bronze	Third place
Green	Points classification
Blue	Non-points classification
Blue	Non-classified finish (NC)
Purple	Retired, not classified (Ret)
Red	Did not qualify (DNQ)
Red	Did not pre-qualify (DNPQ)
Black	Disqualified (DSQ)
White	Did not start (DNS)
White	Withdrew (WD)
White	Race cancelled (C)
Blank	Did not practice (DNP)
Blank	Did not arrive (DNA)
Blank	Excluded (EX)

Bold - Pole position
Italics - Fastest lap

=== Manufacturers' championship ===
The Manufacturers' championship was won by Ford.
