= 2024 Chevrolet Detroit Grand Prix =

(United States) 2024 Chevrolet Detroit Grand Prix
Race details
6th round of the 2024 IndyCar season
| ← Previous race | Next race → |
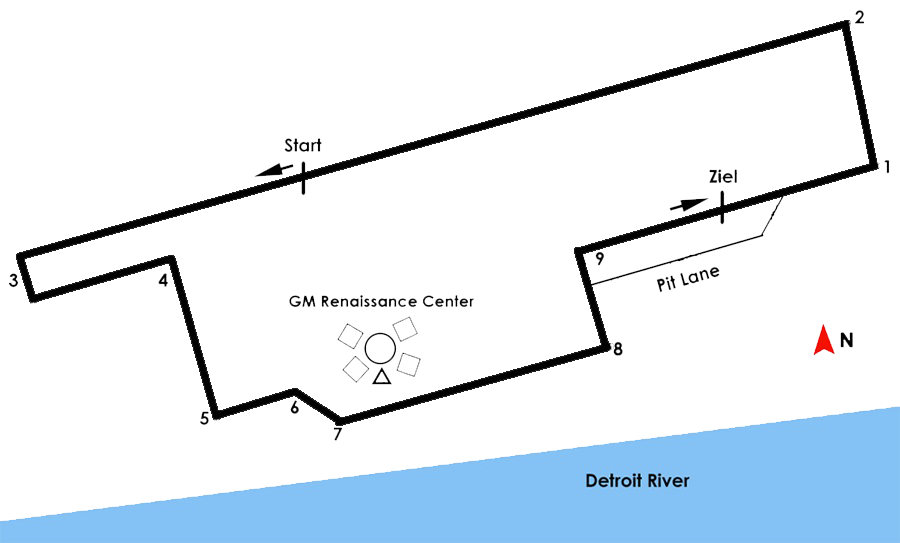
- Layout of the Detroit street circuit
- Date: June 2, 2024
- Official name: Chevrolet Detroit Grand Prix
- Location: Detroit street circuit, Detroit, Michigan
- Course: Temporary street circuit 1.645 mi / 2.647 km
- Distance: 100 laps 164.500 mi / 264.737 km

Pole position
- Driver: (United States) Colton Herta (Andretti Global)
- Time: 01:00.5475

Fastest lap
- Driver: (United States) Colton Herta (Andretti Global)
- Time: 01:02.7094 (on lap 14 of 100)

Podium
- First: (New Zealand) Scott Dixon (Chip Ganassi Racing)
- Second: (Sweden) Marcus Ericsson (Andretti Global)
- Third: (New Zealand) Marcus Armstrong (Chip Ganassi Racing)

Chronology
| Previous | Next |
|---|---|
| 2023 | 2025 |

The 2024 Chevrolet Detroit Grand Prix was the sixth round of the 2024 IndyCar Season. The race was held on June 2, 2024, in downtown Detroit, Michigan at the Detroit street circuit. The race consisted of 100 laps and was won by Scott Dixon, his second win of the season.

== Practice ==
=== Practice 1 ===
| Pos | No. | Driver | Team | Engine | Lap Time |
|---|---|---|---|---|---|
| 1 | 10 | (Spain) Álex Palou | Chip Ganassi Racing | Honda | 01:01.7210 |
| 2 | 5 | (Mexico) Pato O'Ward | Arrow McLaren | Chevrolet | 01:01.7315 |
| 3 | 26 | (United States) Colton Herta | Andretti Global | Honda | 01:01.7968 |

=== Practice 2 ===
| Pos | No. | Driver | Team | Engine | Lap Time |
|---|---|---|---|---|---|
| 1 | 26 | (United States) Colton Herta | Andretti Global | Honda | 01:01.5726 |
| 2 | 27 | (United States) Kyle Kirkwood | Andretti Global | Honda | 01:01.7381 |
| 3 | 10 | (Spain) Álex Palou | Chip Ganassi Racing | Honda | 01:01.8982 |

== Qualifying ==
| Pos | No. | Driver | Team | Engine | Time | | | | Final grid |
| Pos | No. | Driver | Team | Engine | Round 1 | | Round 2 | Round 3 | Final grid |
| Pos | No. | Driver | Team | Engine | Group 1 | Group 2 | Round 2 | Round 3 | Final grid |
|---|---|---|---|---|---|---|---|---|---|
| 1 | 26 | (United States) Colton Herta | Andretti Global | Honda | N/A | 01:00.5731 | **01:00.2304** | **01:00.5475** | 1 |
| 2 | 10 | (Spain) Álex Palou | Chip Ganassi Racing | Honda | N/A | **01:00.3478** | 01:00.6561 | 01:00.6995 | 2 |
| 3 | 2 | (United States) Josef Newgarden | Team Penske | Chevrolet | 01:00.8844 | N/A | 01:00.7055 | 01:00.9607 | 3 |
| 4 | 3 | (New Zealand) Scott McLaughlin | Team Penske | Chevrolet | 01:00.7935 | N/A | 01:00.6007 | 01:01.3344 | 4 |
| 5 | 9 | (New Zealand) Scott Dixon | Chip Ganassi Racing | Honda | N/A | 01:01.0722 | 01:00.5864 | 01:01.3905 | 5 |
| 6 | 27 | (United States) Kyle Kirkwood | Andretti Global | Honda | 01:00.8962 | N/A | 01:00.3994 | 01:04.2926 | 6 |
| 7 | 6 | (France) Théo Pourchaire **R** | Arrow McLaren | Chevrolet | **01:00.7000** | N/A | 01:00.7342 | N/A | 7 |
| 8 | 12 | (Australia) Will Power | Team Penske | Chevrolet | 01:00.9537 | N/A | 01:00.7612 | N/A | 8 |
| 9 | 28 | (Sweden) Marcus Ericsson | Andretti Global | Honda | N/A | 01:00.7537 | 01:00.8505 | N/A | 9 |
| 10 | 14 | (United States) Santino Ferrucci | A.J. Foyt Enterprises | Chevrolet | 01:01.2906 | N/A | 01:01.0351 | N/A | 10 |
| 11 | 45 | (Denmark) Christian Lundgaard | Rahal Letterman Lanigan Racing | Honda | N/A | 01:00.4142 | 01:01.1663 | N/A | 11 |
| 12 | 5 | (Mexico) Pato O'Ward | Arrow McLaren | Chevrolet | N/A | 01:01.0292 | 01:03.0479 | N/A | 12 |
| 13 | 20 | (Denmark) Christian Rasmussen **R** | Ed Carpenter Racing | Chevrolet | 01:01.3930 | N/A | N/A | N/A | 13 |
| 14 | 15 | (United States) Graham Rahal | Rahal Letterman Lanigan Racing | Honda | N/A | 01:01.1336 | N/A | N/A | 20 |
| 15 | 77 | (France) Romain Grosjean | Juncos Hollinger Racing | Chevrolet | 01:01.4933 | N/A | N/A | N/A | 14 |
| 16 | 30 | (Brazil) Pietro Fittipaldi | Rahal Letterman Lanigan Racing | Honda | N/A | 01:01.3684 | N/A | N/A | 15 |
| 17 | 7 | (United States) Alexander Rossi | Arrow McLaren | Chevrolet | 01:01.5905 | N/A | N/A | N/A | 16 |
| 18 | 78 | (Argentina) Agustín Canapino | Juncos Hollinger Racing | Chevrolet | N/A | 01:01.5566 | N/A | N/A | 17 |
| 19 | 21 | (Netherlands) Rinus VeeKay | Ed Carpenter Racing | Chevrolet | 01:01.6040 | N/A | N/A | N/A | 18 |
| 20 | 11 | (New Zealand) Marcus Armstrong | Chip Ganassi Racing | Honda | N/A | 01:01.7406 | N/A | N/A | 19 |
| 21 | 8 | (Sweden) Linus Lundqvist **R** | Chip Ganassi Racing | Honda | 01:01.6297 | N/A | N/A | N/A | 21 |
| 22 | 60 | (Sweden) Felix Rosenqvist | Meyer Shank Racing | Honda | N/A | 01:01.7441 | N/A | N/A | 22 |
| 23 | 4 | (Cayman Islands) Kyffin Simpson **R** | Chip Ganassi Racing | Honda | 01:01.7770 | N/A | N/A | N/A | 27 |
| 24 | 41 | (United States) Sting Ray Robb | A.J. Foyt Enterprises | Chevrolet | N/A | 01:01.8454 | N/A | N/A | 23 |
| 25 | 51 | (France) Tristan Vautier | Dale Coyne Racing | Honda | 01:02.2091 | N/A | N/A | N/A | 24 |
| 26 | 66 | (Brazil) Hélio Castroneves | Meyer Shank Racing | Honda | N/A | 01:01.9687 | N/A | N/A | 25 |
| 27 | 18 | (United Kingdom) Jack Harvey | Dale Coyne Racing | Honda | N/A | 01:02.1185 | N/A | N/A | 26 |

Bold text indicates fastest time set in session

Graham Rahal and Kyffin Simpson both received a six-place grid penalty for making unapproved engine changes

=== Sunday Warmup ===
| Pos | No. | Driver | Team | Engine | Lap Time |
|---|---|---|---|---|---|
| 1 | 2 | (United States) Josef Newgarden | Team Penske | Chevrolet | 01:02.0463 |
| 2 | 26 | (United States) Colton Herta | Andretti Global | Honda | 01:02.0647 |
| 3 | 5 | (Mexico) Pato O'Ward | Arrow McLaren | Chevrolet | 01:02.1307 |

== Race ==
=== Box Score ===
| Pos | No. | Driver | Team | Engine | Laps | Time/Retired | Pit Stops | Grid | Laps Led | Pts. |
|---|---|---|---|---|---|---|---|---|---|---|
| 1 | 9 | (New Zealand) Scott Dixon | Chip Ganassi Racing | Honda | 100 | 02:06:07.9684 | 2 | 5 | 35 | 53 |
| 2 | 28 | (Sweden) Marcus Ericsson | Andretti Global | Honda | 100 | +0.8567 | 2 | 9 | | 40 |
| 3 | 11 | (New Zealand) Marcus Armstrong | Chip Ganassi Racing | Honda | 100 | +4.9129 | 4 | 19 | | 35 |
| 4 | 27 | (United States) Kyle Kirkwood | Andretti Global | Honda | 100 | +6.1249 | 2 | 6 | 24 | 33 |
| 5 | 7 | (United States) Alexander Rossi | Arrow McLaren | Chevrolet | 100 | +8.9532 | 4 | 16 | | 30 |
| 6 | 12 | (Australia) Will Power | Team Penske | Chevrolet | 100 | +10.1045 | 4 | 8 | | 28 |
| 7 | 5 | (Mexico) Pato O'Ward | Arrow McLaren | Chevrolet | 100 | +11.4821 | 4 | 12 | | 26 |
| 8 | 60 | (Sweden) Felix Rosenqvist | Meyer Shank Racing | Honda | 100 | +15.4998 | 4 | 22 | | 24 |
| 9 | 14 | (United States) Santino Ferrucci | A.J. Foyt Enterprises | Chevrolet | 100 | +18.2882 | 5 | 10 | | 22 |
| 10 | 6 | (France) Théo Pourchaire R | Arrow McLaren | Chevrolet | 100 | +18.8912 | 4 | 7 | | 20 |
| 11 | 45 | (Denmark) Christian Lundgaard | Rahal Letterman Lanigan Racing | Honda | 100 | +23.3158 | 4 | 11 | 6 | 20 |
| 12 | 78 | (Argentina) Agustín Canapino | Juncos Hollinger Racing | Chevrolet | 100 | +27.3674 | 4 | 17 | | 18 |
| 13 | 30 | (Brazil) Pietro Fittipaldi | Rahal Letterman Lanigan Racing | Honda | 100 | +28.3686 | 4 | 15 | | 17 |
| 14 | 21 | (Netherlands) Rinus VeeKay | Ed Carpenter Racing | Chevrolet | 100 | +29.4122 | 3 | 19 | | 16 |
| 15 | 15 | (United States) Graham Rahal | Rahal Letterman Lanigan Racing | Honda | 100 | +30.1565 | 4 | 20 | | 15 |
| 16 | 10 | (Spain) Álex Palou | Chip Ganassi Racing | Honda | 100 | +39.0438 | 5 | 2 | 1 | 15 |
| 17 | 18 | (United Kingdom) Jack Harvey | Dale Coyne Racing | Honda | 100 | +46.3377 | 5 | 26 | | 13 |
| 18 | 51 | (France) Tristan Vautier | Dale Coyne Racing | Honda | 99 | +1 Lap | 4 | 24 | | 12 |
| 19 | 26 | (United States) Colton Herta | Andretti Global | Honda | 99 | +1 Lap | 4 | 1 | 33 | 13 |
| 20 | 3 | (New Zealand) Scott McLaughlin | Team Penske | Chevrolet | 99 | +1 Lap | 2 | 4 | | 10 |
| 21 | 41 | (United States) Sting Ray Robb | A.J. Foyt Enterprises | Chevrolet | 99 | +1 Lap | 4 | 23 | | 9 |
| 22 | 8 | (Sweden) Linus Lundqvist R | Chip Ganassi Racing | Honda | 99 | +1 Lap | 5 | 21 | | 8 |
| 23 | 77 | (France) Romain Grosjean | Juncos Hollinger Racing | Chevrolet | 97 | +3 Laps | 2 | 14 | | 7 |
| 24 | 4 | (Cayman Islands) Kyffin Simpson R | Chip Ganassi Racing | Honda | 96 | +4 Laps | 6 | 27 | | 6 |
| 25 | 66 | (Brazil) Hélio Castroneves | Meyer Shank Racing | Honda | 95 | +5 Laps | 5 | 25 | | 5 |
| 26 | 2 | (United States) Josef Newgarden | Team Penske | Chevrolet | 94 | +6 Laps | 5 | 3 | 1 | 6 |
| 27 | 20 | (Denmark) Christian Rasmussen R | Ed Carpenter Racing | Chevrolet | 24 | Mechanical | | 13 | | 5 |
Fastest lap: (United States) Colton Herta (Andretti Global) – 1:02.7094 (lap 24)

=== Race Statistics ===
Lap Leaders
| Laps | Leader |
|---|---|
| 1–33 | Colton Herta |
| 34 | Josef Newgarden |
| 35–40 | Christian Lundgaard |
| 41-64 | Kyle Kirkwood |
| 65 | Álex Palou |
| 66-100 | Scott Dixon |
Official Box Score

Cautions: 8 for 47 laps
| Laps | Reason |
|---|---|
| 1–3 | Contact involving Pato O'Ward, Alexander Rossi, Linus Lundqvist, Will Power, Santino Ferrucci, Jack Harvey and Tristan Vautier at turn 3 |
| 16–21 | Contact involving Kyffin Simpson and Helio Castroneves at turn 5 |
| 33–40 | Contact involving Scott McLaughlin at turn 1 |
| 41-45 | Contact involving Will Power and Rinus VeeKay at turn 3 |
| 46-52 | Contact involving Colton Herta and Tristan Vautier at turn 5 |
| 53-59 | Contact involving Linus Lundqvist, Marcus Armstrong, Christian Lundgaard and Romain Grosjean at turn 3 |
| 63-69 | Contact involving Scott McLaughlin and Sting Ray Robb at turn 5 |
| 70-73 | Contact involving Josef Newgarden and Álex Palou at turn 3 |
Official Box Score

== Championship standings after the race ==
Drivers' Championship standings

| | Pos. | Driver | Points |
|---|---|---|---|
| 1 | 1 | (New Zealand) Scott Dixon | 216 |
| 1 | 2 | (Spain) Álex Palou | 198 |
| | 3 | (Australia) Will Power | 185 |
| | 4 | (Mexico) Pato O'Ward | 160 |
| 3 | 5 | (United States) Alexander Rossi | 150 |

Note: Only the top five positions are included.

| Previous race: 2024 Indianapolis 500 | IndyCar Series; 2024 season | Next race: 2024 XPEL Grand Prix at Road America |
| Previous race: 2023 Chevrolet Detroit Grand Prix | Chevrolet Detroit Grand Prix | Next race: 2025 Chevrolet Detroit Grand Prix |
