= 2023 Chevrolet Detroit Grand Prix =

Indycar race held in Detroit, Michigan

(United States) 2023 Chevrolet Detroit Grand Prix
Race details
7th round of the 2023 IndyCar season
← Previous race	Next race →
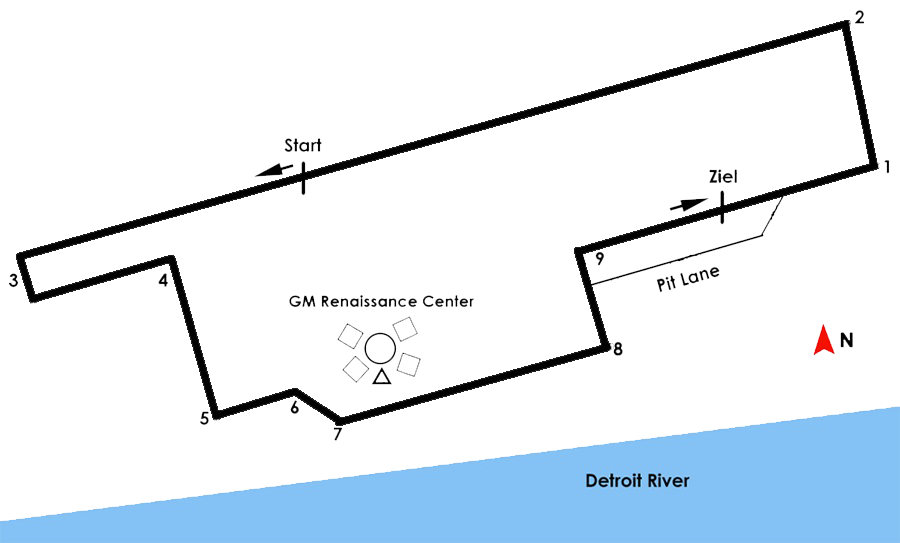
- Layout of the Detroit street circuit
- Date: June 4, 2023
- Official name: Chevrolet Detroit Grand Prix presented by Lear
- Location: Detroit street circuit, Detroit, Michigan
- Course: Temporary street circuit 1.645 mi / 2.647 km
- Distance: 100 laps 164.500 mi / 264.737 km

Pole position
- Driver: (Spain) Álex Palou (Chip Ganassi Racing)
- Time: 01:01.8592

Fastest lap
- Driver: (United States) Kyle Kirkwood (Andretti Autosport)
- Time: 01:01.9410 (on lap 69 of 100)

Podium
- First: (Spain) Álex Palou (Chip Ganassi Racing)
- Second: (Australia) Will Power (Team Penske)
- Third: (Sweden) Felix Rosenqvist (Arrow McLaren)

Chronology
Previous	Next
2022	2024

The 2023 Chevrolet Detroit Grand Prix presented by Lear was the seventh round of the 2023 IndyCar season. The race was held on June 4, 2023, in downtown Detroit, Michigan at the Detroit street circuit. This year saw racing return to the downtown street circuit instead of The Raceway on Belle Isle, where it had been since 1992. The race consisted of 100 laps and was won by Álex Palou.

== Entry list ==
Key	Meaning
R	Rookie
W	Past winner

No.	Driver	Team	Engine
2	(United States) Josef Newgarden W	Team Penske	Chevrolet
3	(New Zealand) Scott McLaughlin	Team Penske	Chevrolet
5	(Mexico) Patricio O'Ward W	Arrow McLaren	Chevrolet
06	(Brazil) Hélio Castroneves W	Meyer Shank Racing	Honda
6	(Sweden) Felix Rosenqvist	Arrow McLaren	Chevrolet
7	(United States) Alexander Rossi	Arrow McLaren	Chevrolet
8	(Sweden) Marcus Ericsson W	Chip Ganassi Racing	Honda
9	(New Zealand) Scott Dixon W	Chip Ganassi Racing	Honda
10	(Spain) Álex Palou	Chip Ganassi Racing	Honda
11	(New Zealand) Marcus Armstrong R	Chip Ganassi Racing	Honda
12	(Australia) Will Power W	Team Penske	Chevrolet
14	(United States) Santino Ferrucci	A.J. Foyt Enterprises	Chevrolet
15	(United States) Graham Rahal W	Rahal Letterman Lanigan Racing	Honda
18	(United States) David Malukas	Dale Coyne Racing with HMD Motorsports	Honda
20	(United States) Conor Daly	Ed Carpenter Racing	Chevrolet
21	(Netherlands) Rinus VeeKay	Ed Carpenter Racing	Chevrolet
26	(United States) Colton Herta	Andretti Autosport with Curb-Agajanian	Honda
27	(United States) Kyle Kirkwood	Andretti Autosport	Honda
28	(France) Romain Grosjean	Andretti Autosport	Honda
29	(Canada) Devlin DeFrancesco	Andretti Steinbrenner Autosport	Honda
30	(United Kingdom) Jack Harvey	Rahal Letterman Lanigan Racing	Honda
45	(Denmark) Christian Lundgaard	Rahal Letterman Lanigan Racing	Honda
51	(United States) Sting Ray Robb R	Dale Coyne Racing with Rick Ware Racing	Honda
55	(Denmark) Benjamin Pedersen R	A.J. Foyt Enterprises	Chevrolet
60	(France) Simon Pagenaud W	Meyer Shank Racing	Honda
77	(United Kingdom) Callum Ilott	Juncos Hollinger Racing	Chevrolet
78	(Argentina) Agustín Canapino R	Juncos Hollinger Racing	Chevrolet

== Practice ==
=== Practice 1 ===
Top Practice Speeds
Pos	No.	Driver	Team	Engine	Lap Time
1	5	(Mexico) Pato O'Ward W	Arrow McLaren	Chevrolet	01:03.0773
2	9	(New Zealand) Scott Dixon W	Chip Ganassi Racing	Honda	01:03.1759
3	27	(United States) Kyle Kirkwood	Andretti Autosport	Honda	01:03.5140

=== Practice 2 ===
Top Practice Speeds
Pos	No.	Driver	Team	Engine	Lap Time
1	9	(New Zealand) Scott Dixon W	Chip Ganassi Racing	Honda	01:03.2317
2	12	(Australia) Will Power W	Team Penske	Chevrolet	01:03.4627
3	27	(United States) Kyle Kirkwood	Andretti Autosport	Honda	01:03.5658

== Qualifying ==
Álex Palou of Chip Ganassi Racing won the pole, his second of the season, with his first coming in the last race, the Indy 500.

=== Qualifying classification ===
Pos	No.	Driver	Team	Engine	Time				Final grid
Pos	No.	Driver	Team	Engine	Round 1		Round 2	Round 3	Final grid
Pos	No.	Driver	Team	Engine	Group 1	Group 2	Round 2	Round 3	Final grid
1	10	(Spain) Álex Palou	Chip Ganassi Racing	Honda	01:02.2431	N/A	**01:01.6390**	**01:01.8592**	1
2	3	(New Zealand) Scott McLaughlin	Team Penske	Chevrolet	N/A	01:01.7482	01:01.9794	01:02.1592	2
3	28	(France) Romain Grosjean	Andretti Autosport	Honda	01:02.1756	N/A	01:01.9018	01:02.2896	3
4	9	(New Zealand) Scott Dixon **W**	Chip Ganassi Racing	Honda	N/A	01:02.0602	01:02.0608	01:02.4272	4
5	2	(United States) Josef Newgarden **W**	Team Penske	Chevrolet	N/A	01:02.1900	01:01.9679	01:02.5223	5
6	8	(Sweden) Marcus Ericsson **W**	Chip Ganassi Racing	Honda	N/A	01:02.0754	01:01.9449	01:02.6184	6
7	12	(Australia) Will Power **W**	Team Penske	Chevrolet	01:02.3454	N/A	01:02.1817	N/A	7
8	60	(France) Simon Pagenaud **W**	Meyer Shank Racing	Honda	01:02.3952	N/A	01:02.1860	N/A	8
9	6	(Sweden) Felix Rosenqvist	Arrow McLaren	Chevrolet	01:02.5341	N/A	01:02.1937	N/A	9
10	5	(Mexico) Pato O'Ward **W**	Arrow McLaren	Chevrolet	N/A	01:02.0470	01:02.2564	N/A	10
11	11	(New Zealand) Marcus Armstrong **R**	Chip Ganassi Racing	Honda	**01:01.8558**	N/A	01:02.2958	N/A	11
12	27	(United States) Kyle Kirkwood	Andretti Autosport	Honda	N/A	**01:01.5305**	01:04.6075	N/A	12
13	7	(United States) Alexander Rossi	Arrow McLaren	Chevrolet	01:02.5714	N/A	N/A	N/A	13
14	21	(Netherlands) Rinus VeeKay	Ed Carpenter Racing	Chevrolet	N/A	01:02.1911	N/A	N/A	14
15	20	(United States) Conor Daly	Ed Carpenter Racing	Chevrolet	01:02.9522	N/A	N/A	N/A	15
16	77	(United Kingdom) Callum Ilott	Juncos Hollinger Racing	Chevrolet	N/A	01:02.2644	N/A	N/A	16
17	29	(Canada) Devlin DeFrancesco	Andretti Steinbrenner Autosport	Honda	01:03.0017	N/A	N/A	N/A	17
18	45	(Denmark) Christian Lundgaard	Rahal Letterman Lanigan Racing	Honda	N/A	01:02.6495	N/A	N/A	18
19	55	(Denmark) Benjamin Pedersen **R**	A. J. Foyt Enterprises	Chevrolet	01:03.1599	N/A	N/A	N/A	19
20	78	(Argentina) Agustín Canapino **R**	Juncos Hollinger Racing	Chevrolet	N/A	01:02.9071	N/A	N/A	20
21	18	(United States) David Malukas	Dale Coyne Racing with HMD Motorsports	Honda	01:03.2126	N/A	N/A	N/A	21
22	14	(United States) Santino Ferrucci	A. J. Foyt Enterprises	Chevrolet	N/A	01:02.9589	N/A	N/A	22
23	06	(Brazil) Hélio Castroneves **W**	Meyer Shank Racing	Honda	01:03.3879	N/A	N/A	N/A	23
24	26	(United States) Colton Herta	Andretti Autosport with Curb-Agajanian	Honda	N/A	01:03.4165	N/A	N/A	24
25	30	(United Kingdom) Jack Harvey	Rahal Letterman Lanigan Racing	Honda	01:03.7728	N/A	N/A	N/A	25
26	51	(United States) Sting Ray Robb **R**	Dale Coyne Racing with Rick Ware Racing	Honda	N/A	01:03.7496	N/A	N/A	26
27	15	(United States) Graham Rahal **W**	Rahal Letterman Lanigan Racing	Honda	N/A	01:03.8663	N/A	N/A	27

Notes

- **Bold text** indicates fastest time set in session.

== Warmup ==
Top Practice Speeds
Pos	No.	Driver	Team	Engine	Lap Time
1	60	(France) Simon Pagenaud W	Meyer Shank Racing	Honda	01:02.3615
2	77	(United Kingdom) Callum Ilott	Juncos Hollinger Racing	Chevrolet	01:02.4818
3	11	(New Zealand) Marcus Armstrong R	Chip Ganassi Racing	Honda	01:02.5860

== Race ==
The race started at 3:30 PM ET on June 4, 2023.

=== Report ===
The race started with Alex Palou starting from pole position, followed by Scott McLaughlin on the front row. Twenty drivers started the race on alternate tires (guayule compound), while seven, including the three Arrow McLaren drivers and Will Power, opted for primary tires.

The first attempt at the start was aborted due to a grid lineup problem. On the second attempt, the race got off to a bumpy start when Callum Ilott collided with Kyle Kirkwood at the turn 3, resulting in the first yellow flag. Ilott abandoned the race, while Kirkwood had his rear wing replaced.

The race restarted on lap 7, and Scott McLaughlin tried to regain the second position he had lost to Romain Grosjean at the start, but to no avail.

Alex Palou began to distance himself at the front of the race. In just two laps after the restart, he took a 2-second lead over Grosjean and, in five laps, widened the gap to 5 seconds.

Marcus Ericsson's alternate tires started to lose performance, which was taken advantage of by Will Power and Felix Rosenqvist, who moved up to fifth and sixth place respectively. Pato O'Ward also overtook Ericsson and moved up to seventh place. Ericsson made his stop on lap 17 to change to primary tires.

Power continued to show great pace and made impressive moves in Turn 3, passing Scott Dixon for fourth and then overtaking McLaughlin for third. On lap 22, Power managed to overtake Grosjean and moved into second position. Meanwhile, Palou was still leading the race with a 9.9-second advantage over second place, without suffering too much wear on the alternate tires. However, Power reduced the gap to Palou significantly. Meanwhile, the McLaren drivers, who followed the same strategy as Power, were unable to overtake either Grosjean or McLaughlin.

On lap 29, Grosjean overshot at Turn 8 and then pitted. On the following lap, Palou and McLaughlin made their stops. Dixon took advantage of McLaughlin's stop on lap 25 to overtake him with an undercut strategy.

The drivers who started on primary tires began to make their pit stops. Power made his pit stop on lap 35 to change to alternate tires and came out just behind Palou. O'Ward and Alexander Rossi also made their stops on lap 36, but there were problems with O'Ward's left rear tire, which caused him to be stopped in the pit lane for a lap before he could return to the track. O'Ward wasn't the only one with pit road issues, as Josef Newgarden had fuel hose difficulties.

Pato O'Ward tried to overtake Santino Ferrucci, but made a mistake and hit the wall in turn 9 on lap 44, generating the second yellow flag. This situation neutralized the advantage Palou had gained over Power on the primary tires.

During the yellow flag, Ericsson, Conor Daly, Hélio Castroneves, Jack Harvey and Benjamin Pedersen took the opportunity to make their pit stops.

The race restarted on lap 49. The top positions were maintained, although there were difficulties to get away from Ferrucci. Immediately after, the yellow flag was shown due to a Sting Ray Robb incident in the Turn 3 run-off. Meanwhile, during the neutralization period, Graham Rahal and Pedersen hit the wall in Turn 1. Pedersen managed to continue the race, but was two laps down, while Rahal had to retire.

Before the impending restart, Palou was informed to use the emergency mode and shut down the car due to gearbox problems. The race restarted on lap 56. Will Power managed to overtake Palou in Turn 3 and took the lead.

The drop in performance of the Power's alternate tires became evident, and Palou took advantage of the situation to attack Power. Power made a mistake in turn 3, allowing Palou to retake the lead on lap 65.

The leading drivers began to make their pit stops to change to primary tires for the final stint of the race. Dixon made his stop on lap 65, followed by Palou, Power and Rosenqvist on lap 66, and finally Rossi and Grosjean on lap 67. Ericsson moved ahead of Palou and Power after making one of the stops during one of the previous yellow flags.

There were several on-track incidents, including contact between McLaughlin and Grosjean as the latter exited the pits, the incident in which Rosenqvist pushed Rossi into the wall, and contact between Grosjean and Newgarden. Ericsson made his final pit stop on lap 76, being relegated tenth in the running order. Palou remained in the lead, 5 seconds ahead of Will Power, who focused on protecting himself from Dixon's attacks.

With 19 laps to go, Grosjean crashed in turn 4, causing the fourth yellow flag. The race restarted with 14 laps to go, but immediately the fifth yellow flag was displayed due to a David Malukas crash in Turn 9, on an unfortunate day for Dale Coyne.

Another restart occurred with 10 laps to go. Palou held on to the lead, while Power and Dixon got tangled up in touches, allowing Rossi to take second place. Power took third, followed by Rosenqvist in fourth and Dixon in fifth. However, an incident between Robb and Ferrucci in Turn 3 led to the sixth and final yellow flag.

The last restart came with 5 laps to go, with Palou holding the lead and Power regaining second place. Rossi fought for the last podium place. In the midst of the madness, Rosenqvist pushed Rossi into the wall to secure third place, and Dixon took advantage of this situation to take fourth.

Alex Palou crossed the finish line as the winner of the Chevrolet Detroit Grand Prix, taking his second win of the season and his first on a street circuit in his IndyCar career. The podium was completed by Power, who had his best performance of the year, and Rosenqvist.

=== Race classification ===
Pos	No.	Driver	Team	Engine	Laps	Time/Retired	Pit Stops	Grid	Laps Led	Pts.
1	10	(Spain) Álex Palou	Chip Ganassi Racing	Honda	100	02:01:58.1171	2	1	74	54
2	12	(Australia) Will Power W	Team Penske	Chevrolet	100	+1.1843	2	7	14	41
3	6	(Sweden) Felix Rosenqvist	Arrow McLaren	Chevrolet	100	+5.9515	2	9		35
4	9	(New Zealand) Scott Dixon W	Chip Ganassi Racing	Honda	100	+7.5682	2	4		32
5	7	(United States) Alexander Rossi	Arrow McLaren	Chevrolet	100	+9.9841	2	13	1	31
6	27	(United States) Kyle Kirkwood	Andretti Autosport	Honda	100	+10.5426	4	12	1	29
7	3	(New Zealand) Scott McLaughlin	Team Penske	Chevrolet	100	+10.9350	2	2		26
8	11	(New Zealand) Marcus Armstrong R	Chip Ganassi Racing	Honda	100	+11.6792	2	11		24
9	8	(Sweden) Marcus Ericsson W	Chip Ganassi Racing	Honda	100	+13.0181	3	6	7	23
10	2	(United States) Josef Newgarden W	Team Penske	Chevrolet	100	+14.0223	2	5	2	21
11	26	(United States) Colton Herta	Andretti Autosport with Curb-Agajanian	Honda	100	+17.6606	3	24		19
12	29	(Canada) Devlin DeFrancesco	Andretti Steinbrenner Autosport	Honda	100	+19.4321	3	17		18
13	60	(France) Simon Pagenaud W	Meyer Shank Racing	Honda	100	+19.6486	2	8		17
14	78	(Argentina) Agustín Canapino R	Juncos Hollinger Racing	Chevrolet	100	+21.4219	2	20		16
15	20	(United States) Conor Daly	Ed Carpenter Racing	Chevrolet	100	+21.7748	3	15		15
16	45	(Denmark) Christian Lundgaard	Rahal Letterman Lanigan Racing	Honda	100	+22.1160	3	18		14
17	30	(United Kingdom) Jack Harvey	Rahal Letterman Lanigan Racing	Honda	100	+23.0710	3	25		13
18	21	(Netherlands) Rinus VeeKay	Ed Carpenter Racing	Chevrolet	100	+23.8193	2	14		12
19	06	(Brazil) Hélio Castroneves W	Meyer Shank Racing	Honda	100	+24.6734	5	23		11
20	55	(Denmark) Benjamin Pedersen R	A. J. Foyt Enterprises	Chevrolet	97	+3 Laps	4	19		10
21	14	(United States) Santino Ferrucci	A. J. Foyt Enterprises	Chevrolet	97	+3 Laps	5	22		9
22	51	(United States) Sting Ray Robb R	Dale Coyne Racing with Rick Ware Racing	Honda	97	+3 Laps	3	26		8
23	18	(United States) David Malukas	Dale Coyne Racing with HMD Motorsports	Honda	85	Contact	2	21		7
24	28	(France) Romain Grosjean	Andretti Autosport	Honda	80	Contact	2	3		6
25	15	(United States) Graham Rahal W	Rahal Letterman Lanigan Racing	Honda	50	Contact	2	27		5
26	5	(Mexico) Pato O'Ward W	Arrow McLaren	Chevrolet	41	Contact	3	10	1	6
27	77	(United Kingdom) Callum Ilott	Juncos Hollinger Racing	Chevrolet	1	Contact		16		5
Fastest lap: (United States) Kyle Kirkwood (Andretti Autosport) – 01:01.9410 (lap 69)

== Championship standings after the race ==
Drivers' Championship standings

	Pos.	Driver	Points
Unchanged	1	(Spain) Álex Palou	273
Unchanged	2	(Sweden) Marcus Ericsson	222
1	3	(United States) Josef Newgarden	203
1	4	(New Zealand) Scott Dixon	194
2	5	(Mexico) Pato O'Ward	191

Engine manufacturer standings

	Pos.	Manufacturer	Points
Unchanged	1	Honda	575
Unchanged	2	Chevrolet	553

- Note: Only the top five positions are included.

Previous race: 2023 Indianapolis 500	IndyCar Series; 2023 season	Next race: 2023 Sonsio Grand Prix at Road America
Previous race: 2022 Chevrolet Detroit Grand Prix	Chevrolet Detroit Grand Prix	Next race: 2024 Chevrolet Detroit Grand Prix
