= Álex Palou =

Spanish racing driver (born 1997)

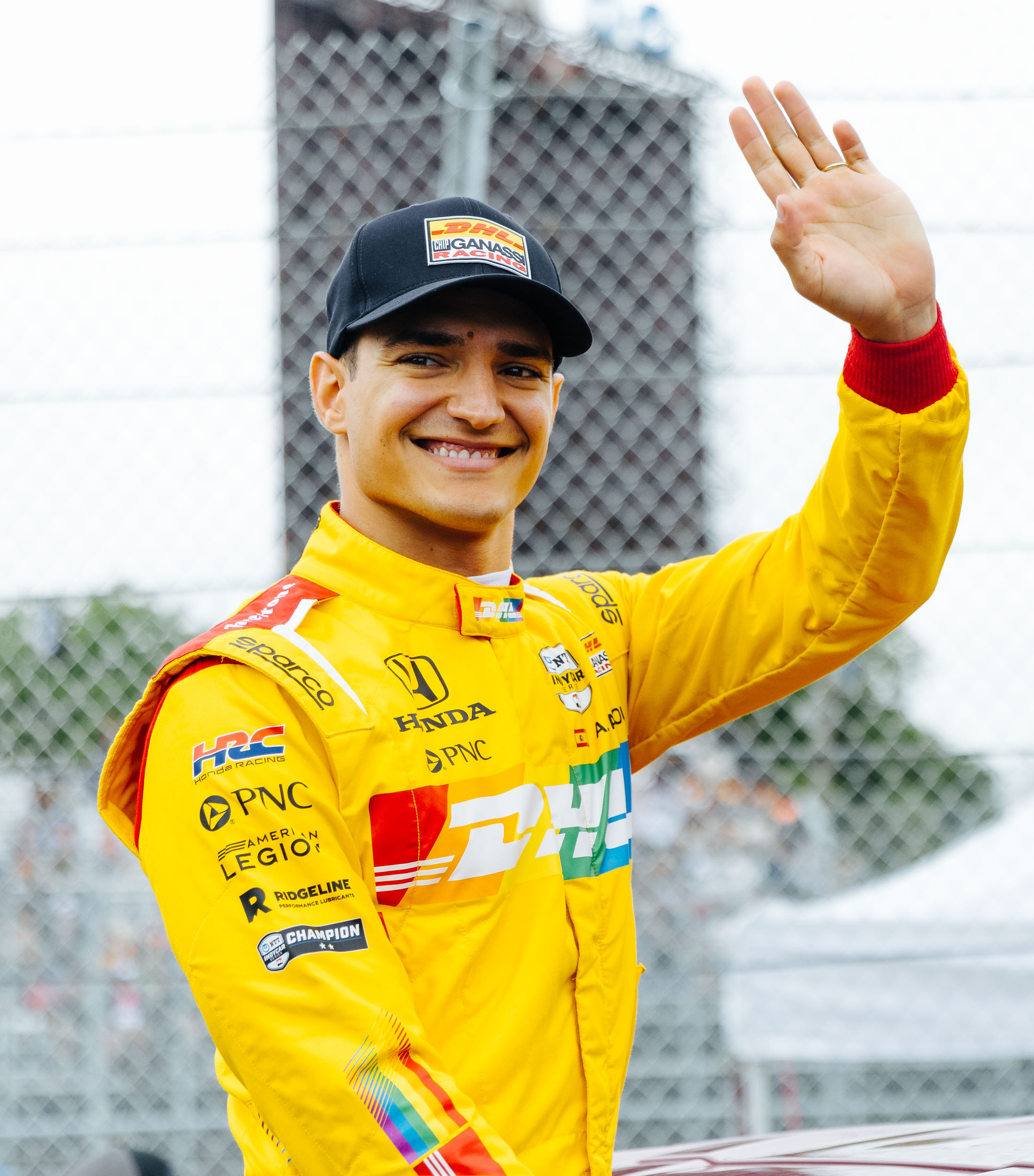
- Palou at the 2024 Chevrolet Detroit Grand Prix
- Nationality: (Spain) Spanish
- Born: Álex Palou Montalbo; 1 April 1997 (age 29) Sant Antoni de Vilamajor, Barcelona, Catalonia, Spain
- Spouse: Esther Valle (m. 2023)
- Children: 1

IndyCar Series career
- 115 races run over 7 years
- Team: No. 10 (Chip Ganassi Racing)
- Best finish: 1st (2021, 2023, 2024, 2025, 2026)
- First race: 2020 Genesys 300 (Texas)
- Last race: 2026 Mission Grand Prix of Monterey (Laguna Seca)
- First win: 2021 Honda Indy Grand Prix of Alabama (Birmingham)
- Last win: 2026 OnlyBulls Grand Prix of Portland (Portland)
Wins	Podiums	Poles
25	51	20

IMSA SportsCar Championship career
- Debut season: 2022
- Current team: Acura Meyer Shank Racing w/ Curb-Agajanian
- Categorisation: FIA Silver (2018–2021); FIA Gold (2022–2023); FIA Platinum (2024–)
- Car number: 93
- Former teams: Cadillac Racing
- Starts: 7
- Wins: 0
- Podiums: 1
- Poles: 0
- Fastest laps: 1
- Best finish: 21st in 2026

24 Hours of Le Mans career
- Years: 2024
- Teams: Cadillac-Ganassi
- Best finish: 7th (2024)

Previous series
- 2019; 2019; 2018; 2017; 2017; 2017; 2015–2016; 2014: Super Formula; Super GT; FIA F3 European; FIA Formula 2; Formula V8 3.5; Japanese F3; GP3 Series; Euroformula Open

Championship titles
- IndyCar Series (2021, 2023, 2024, 2025, 2026); Major victories; Indianapolis 500 (2025)

Álex Palou Montalbo (Catalan pronunciation: [ˈaləks ˈpalɔw monˈtalbu]; born 1 April 1997) is a Spanish racing driver who drives for Chip Ganassi Racing in the IndyCar Series, where he won the 2021, 2023, 2024, 2025, and 2026 championships and the 2025 Indianapolis 500. Palou is the first Spanish racing driver to win a national championship in American open-wheel racing history and also the first Spaniard to win in the Indianapolis 500 and the GP3 Series.

Palou is the third driver with the most IndyCar championships and its predecessors, behind A. J. Foyt (7) and Scott Dixon (6). He is one of three drivers to have debuted with CGR by winning their first race (along with Michael Andretti and Dan Wheldon). In the first 55 races contested in the series, he became the third-best driver statistically behind Mario Andretti and A. J. Foyt, with eight wins, twenty-podium finishes, and thirty-seven top-ten finishes. He is the fourth driver to win three consecutive championships, after Ted Horn, Sébastien Bourdais, and Dario Franchitti, the youngest four-time champion in IndyCar history (28 years, 4 months, and 9 days), and the second driver to achieve four consecutive IndyCar or Champ Car championships, a feat previously accomplished by Sébastien Bourdais, as well as the only to win five titles in six years.

Palou was a reserve driver for the McLaren Formula One team in 2022 and 2023, making his debut in free practice for the 2022 United States Grand Prix.

== Early years ==
Born in Sant Antoni de Vilamajor, Palou began karting in 2003. He achieved his only international title in the KF3 category of the WSK Euro Series in 2012, when he finished runner-up to George Russell in the CIK-FIA European Championship.

=== Euroformula Open ===
Palou made his open-wheel racing debut competing in the Euroformula Open Championship with Campos Racing in 2014. He bookended the season, winning the opening race at the Nürburgring and the final race at Circuit de Barcelona-Catalunya. He also won a race at the Hungaroring to finish third in the series standings, missing out on the runner-up placing by one point to Artur Janosz.

== Racing in Europe ==
=== GP3 Series ===
In 2015, Palou graduated to the GP3 Series with Campos Racing. During the first half of the season, he suffered major reliability issues as well as some driving mistakes due to his lack of experience, but his results improved along the season and he closed the year with a victory in Abu Dhabi. At the Circuit de Barcelona-Catalunya in Spain, Palou qualified fourth for the first race, but he slipped the clutch at the start and lost any opportunity to fight for the points. He made another bad start at the second race. At the Red Bull Ring in Austria, Palou had another bad weekend. Starting from third, he stalled the engine at the start. He later admitted he felt nervous after the mistakes from Barcelona and that that might have contributed to those new errors. He did not finish the second race because of a crash on the first lap.

At the Silverstone Circuit in Great Britain, a gearbox sensor failed when Palou was driving fifth. He was forced to retire and subsequently had to start the second race from the last place on the grid. He managed to overtake eleven cars, eight of them in the first lap, to finish thirteenth. At the Hungaroring in Hungary, Palou started seventh and moved up to fifth until a car hit him from behind. He suffered a puncture and was forced to pit. Starting from the bottom of the grid for the second race, he wrapped up the weekend with an eighteenth place finish. At the Spa-Francorchamps Circuit in Belgium, Palou scored his first points in GP3 as the season passed its halfway point. Struggling with tyre wear and lack of speed, Palou finished in seventh place in the first race. He led most of the second race but eventually fell back to fifth because of the lack of top speed. He later argued that Esteban Ocon was scrapping 0,5 seconds per lap just in the first sector, where the Kemmel Straight was found.

At the Autodromo Nazionale di Monza in Italy, Palou had another difficult weekend because of the lack of top speed. Using the same engine he raced in Belgium, he managed to finish seventh in the first race and subsequently started the second one from the front row. He made "The Great Mistake" (as he wrote in his column) when during the warm-up lap he spun at the main straight and nearly hit the wall. Although his car was not damaged, he fell back to tenth. At the Sochi Autodrom in Russia, Palou received a new engine that solved the top speed problems he suffered in Belgium and Italy. Because of Carlos Sainz's crash during Russian Grand Prix Free Practice 3, the first race of the weekend was moved to Sunday. Palou qualified just a tenth away from Pole Position and scored a provisional season-high in the first race when he crossed the line in fourth place. He was ninth in the second one. At the Bahrain International Circuit, Palou suffered yet again more reliability issues. He started from fourth, but during the warm-up lap a gas sensor failed and the car kept on accelerating when the driver lifted the throttle. He decided to enter the pit lane and retire. Because of this, he started the second race from last place. He gained 14 positions, but ended up tenth and outside from the points.

At the Yas Marina Circuit in Abu Dhabi, Palou won his race in GP3 and became the first Spanish driver to ever get a victory in the series. After being eighth in the first race, he held pole position for the second one. Worried about tyre wear, he targeted for a podium finish. He held the lead at the start and slowly started to pull away from the field. He crossed the line with a 4.4-second margin to Carlin's Antonio Fuoco. Palou continued to race for Campos Racing in his second season in GP3. He scored second place at the Silverstone sprint race and fifth place at the Yas Marina sprint race. He ranked 15th in the overall standings.

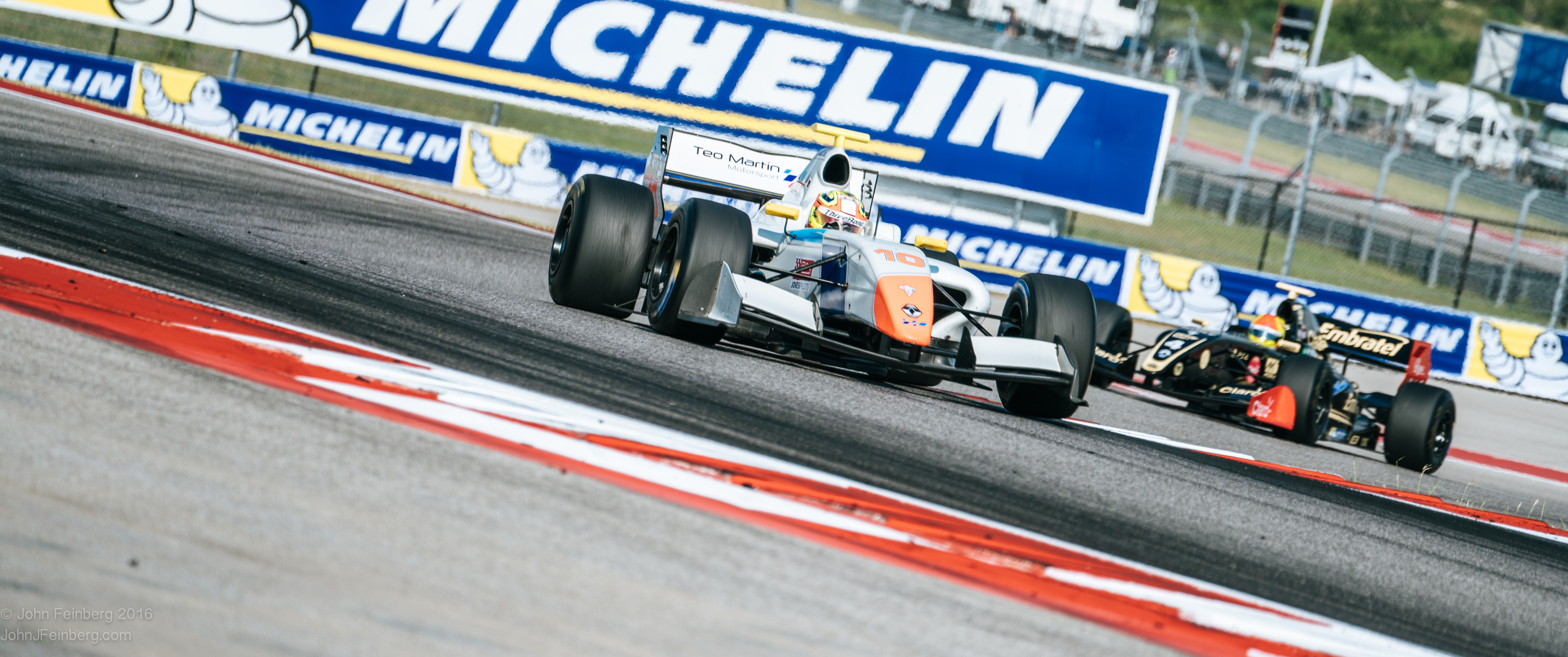
Palou took his third podium from six World Series Formula V8 3.5 races at the Circuit of the Americas.

=== World Series Formula V8 3.5 ===
Palou also raced with Teo Martín Motorsport in three rounds of the 2017 World Series Formula V8 3.5 championship, where he won three poles and a race. This partial season earned him tenth in the championship. Palou finished 2017 with Campos Racing in two Formula 2 rounds, where he scored five points. Palou led the majority of the Jerez sprint race from the reverse grid pole, but ultimately, he could not hang on to the lead with his heavily worn tires and finished eighth. These two rounds finished him 21st in the championship.

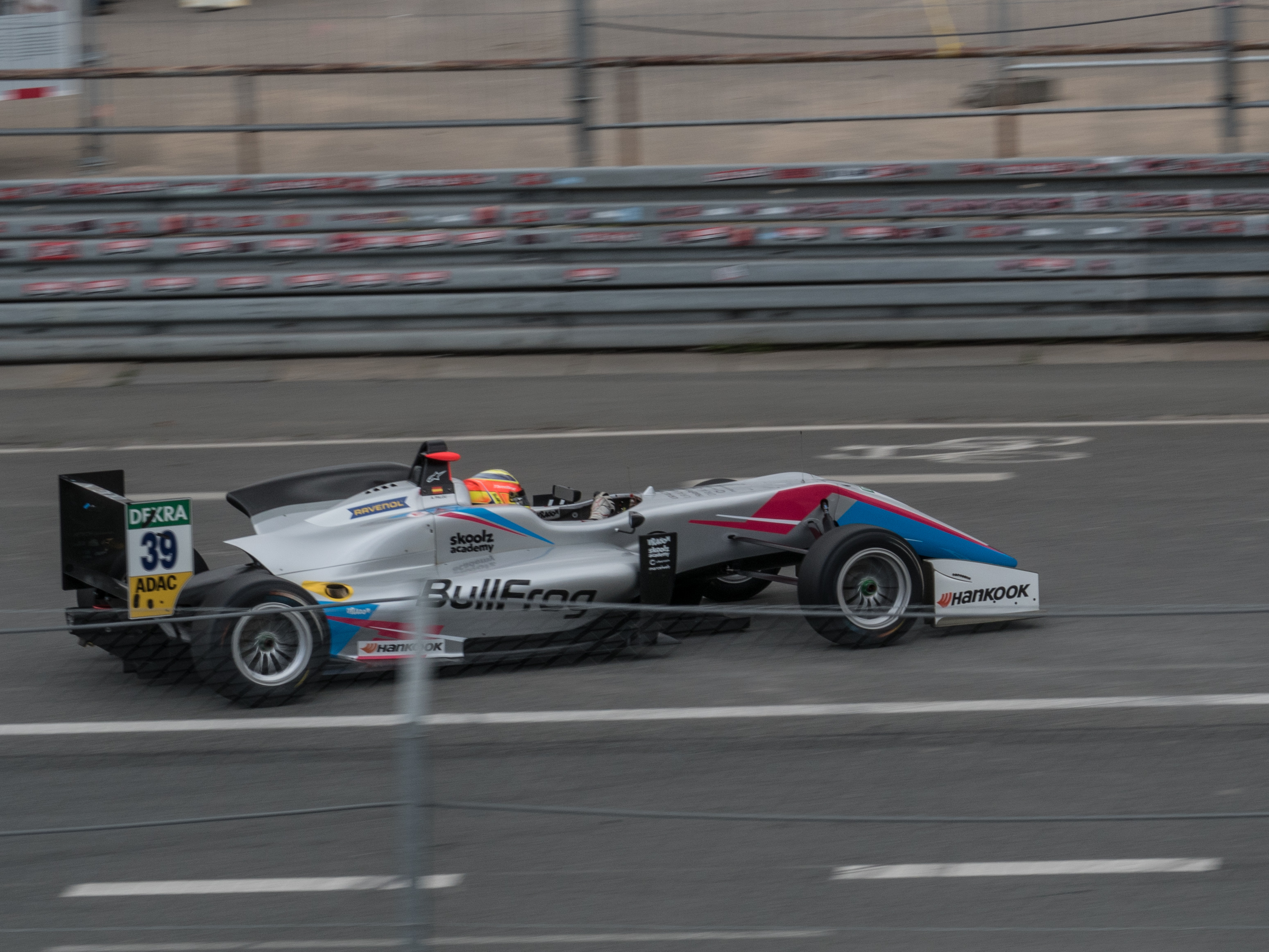
Palou driving at the Norisring in European Formula 3.

=== FIA Formula 3 European Championship ===
In 2018, Palou returned to Europe full-time for a full season with Hitech Bullfrog GP in the 2018 FIA Formula 3 European Championship. He scored seven podiums and ended the year seventh in the championship.

== Racing in Japan ==
=== Japanese Formula 3 ===
Palou moved to Japan in 2017 to compete in Japanese Formula 3 for Threebond with Drago Corse. He won three races but finished the year third in the championship behind Mitsunori Takaboshi and Sho Tsuboi.

=== Super GT and Super Formula ===
Palou moved back to Japan in 2019 to compete full-time with McLaren Customer Racing Japan in the Super GT GT300 class and TCS Nakajima Racing in Super Formula. In Super GT, Palou was partnered with 2004 24 Hours of Le Mans winner Seiji Ara. As a team, they scored one podium at Autopolis but ultimately finished fifteenth in the championship. In Super Formula, Palou had far more success. He won at Fuji Speedway from pole position and, after qualifying on pole at the final round at Suzuka, he looked to be the championship favorite. A problem with the ventilation duct early in the race immensely slowed Palou's car down and he finished nineteenth in the race. This dropped him to third in the championship in the end.

== IndyCar ==
Palou tested an IndyCar in July 2019 with Dale Coyne Racing at Mid-Ohio.

=== Dale Coyne Racing (2020) ===
==== 2020: Rookie season ====
On 19 December 2019, it was announced that Palou would move to the IndyCar Series for a rookie campaign with Dale Coyne Racing with Team Goh. His manager in the IndyCar series is former IndyCar driver Roger Yasukawa.

In his first race for the team at the 2020 Genesys 300 at Texas Motor Speedway, Palou was taken out by fellow rookie Rinus VeeKay. He took his first IndyCar podium at Road America.

=== Chip Ganassi Racing (2021–present) ===
==== 2021 ====
Palou was signed by Chip Ganassi Racing to drive the No. 10 Honda for the 2021 IndyCar Series season. On 18 April 2021, Palou earned his maiden IndyCar Series victory in the season-opening race at Barber Motorsports Park. Palou started on pole for the first time in his IndyCar career at the first race of the season at Texas Motor Speedway, although his pole position was earned due to his early-season championship point lead after qualifying was canceled for the race due to inclement weather. Palou added another podium for the season at the GMR Grand Prix and then finished second in the 2021 Indianapolis 500 to Hélio Castroneves' record-tying fourth victory. Palou's finish in the 500 vaulted him into the points lead for the championship. For the rest of the season, only himself and Pato O'Ward would hold the points lead.

Palou then went on a run of podium finishes after the 500, although he briefly lost the points lead to O'Ward in Detroit by a single point. Palou finished third in the second race in Detroit, won at Road America after Josef Newgarden suffered a gearbox failure, and finished third at Mid Ohio to solidify his points lead in the championship over both Scott Dixon and O'Ward. This was despite suffering three engine change related penalties imposed on him by IndyCar. He gave up the points lead to O'Ward after he and Dixon were collected in an accident caused by Rinus VeeKay at Gateway but took it back after taking his first earned pole position and a third victory at Portland. After a second-place finish at Laguna Seca, Palou carried a thirty-five-point advantage over O'Ward heading into the final race of the season at Long Beach, with only himself, O'Ward, and Josef Newgarden still mathematically capable of winning the title. After O'Ward was knocked out in an accident on the first lap of the race Palou drove conservatively and finished in fourth place, winning his first IndyCar championship. He became the third Chip Ganassi Racing driver to win the IndyCar series championship after Dixon and Dario Franchitti and the first Honda driver other than Dixon to win an IndyCar championship in the Dallara DW12 and turbo V6 era of IndyCar racing. Palou also secured his first IndyCar track discipline championship in 2021, winning the Mario Andretti Cup as the season's highest-scoring driver on the road and street courses. For his Indianapolis Motor Speedway victory lap, he drove a chicken-themed limousine, in honor of his favorite after-victory meal of fried chicken.

==== 2022 ====
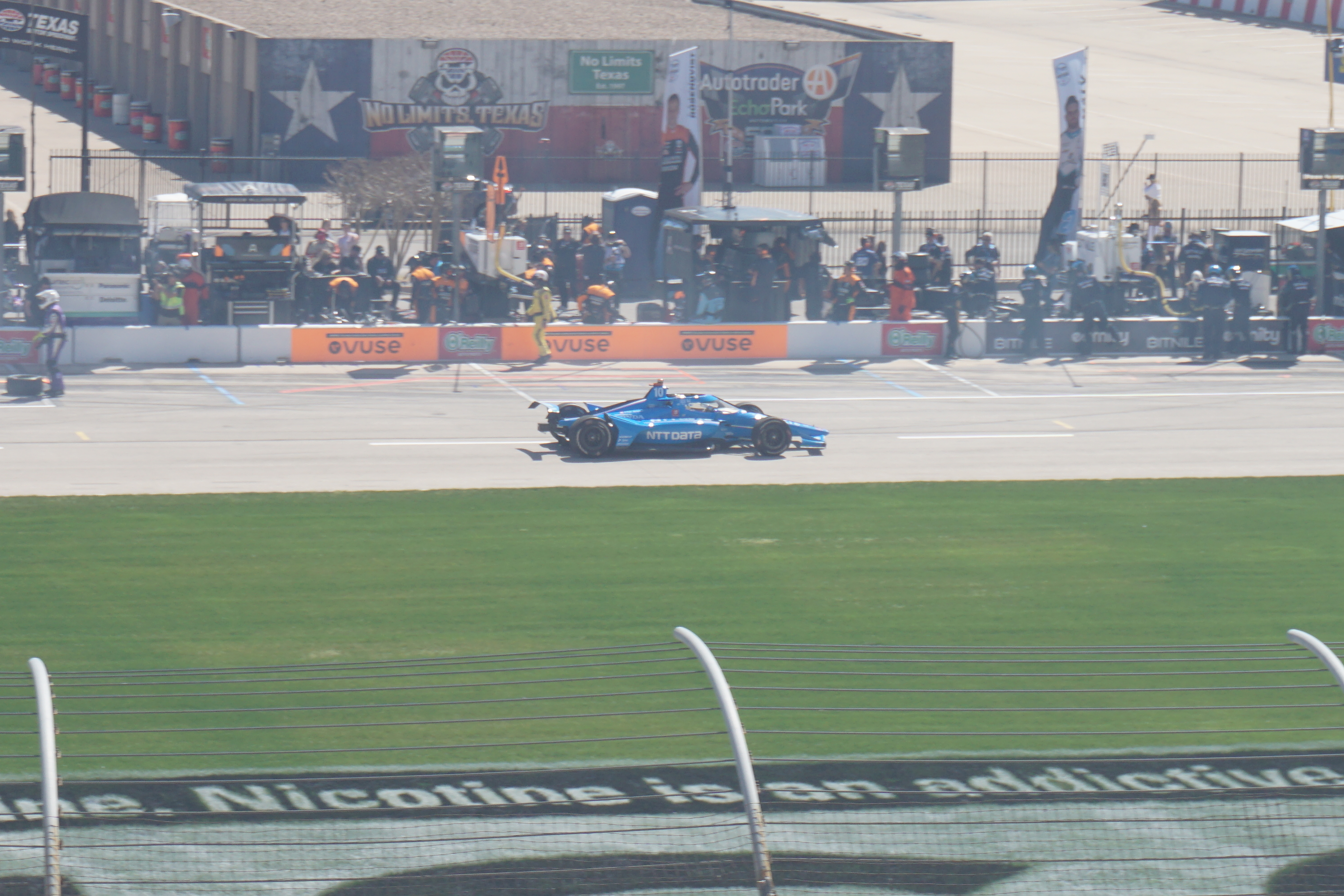
Palou during the 2022 XPEL 375

Palou started the 2022 season out with podiums at St. Petersburg, Long Beach, and Barber, outperforming his Chip Ganassi teammates and putting him in a strong early position to defend his title. The title would eventually be lost to Penske's Will Power, but Palou still finished fifth (due to countback, as he tied Scott McLaughlin with 510 points) with a commanding win in the Laguna Seca finale to round out the year.

===== Contract controversy =====
On 12 July 2022, Chip Ganassi Racing sent a press release saying that they had extended the contract of Palou for the 2023 IndyCar season by exercising the option they held on his deal. Included in the press release was a quote attributed to Palou. Hours later, Palou, via a thread on Twitter denounced this press release, claimed that the quote attributed to him was created by the team (a practice common among IndyCar teams, according to RACER.com's Marshall Pruett) and also not approved by him. He also stated that he had given Chip Ganassi Racing prior notice that he intended to leave the team after the 2022 season and join McLaren Racing's roster of drivers.

Moments after these tweets, McLaren announced that they had signed Palou to a contract for 2023, though it was not specifically mentioned if Palou would drive for Arrow McLaren SP, McLaren's IndyCar operation. Chip Ganassi Racing responded to this by releasing a statement reiterating their claim to Palou's services. On 27 July 2022, Chip Ganassi Racing confirmed they had filed a civil lawsuit against Palou in Marion County, Indiana. On 14 September 2022, it was announced that an agreement had been reached by all parties that would see Palou continue with Chip Ganassi for the 2023 season, with McLaren signing him to test the McLaren MCL35M. Palou was then set to switch to McLaren for the 2024 season. In August 2023, this arrangement fell apart after Palou told McLaren CEO Zak Brown that he had "no intention of honoring his contract" with McLaren, according to Brown. Following this, McLaren Racing and Arrow McLaren sued Palou for nearly $23 million in the U.K. Commercial Court in an attempt to recoup investments made in Palou, including future sponsorship revenue tied to Palou joining McLaren, McLaren's cost when Palou was the test driver, the cost of finding a replacement for Palou, and Palou's $400,000 advanced 2024 salary. In his legal response, Palou admitted to breaching his contract with McLaren as he lost faith in McLaren's ability to land him a seat in Formula One, saying that he is too old to wait and see if someone gets hurt to get his chance.

In January 2026, the London High Court ruled that Palou has to compensate Arrow McLaren $12 million for losses suffered by Palou’s change of mind while dismissing McLaren Racing's claim against Palou.

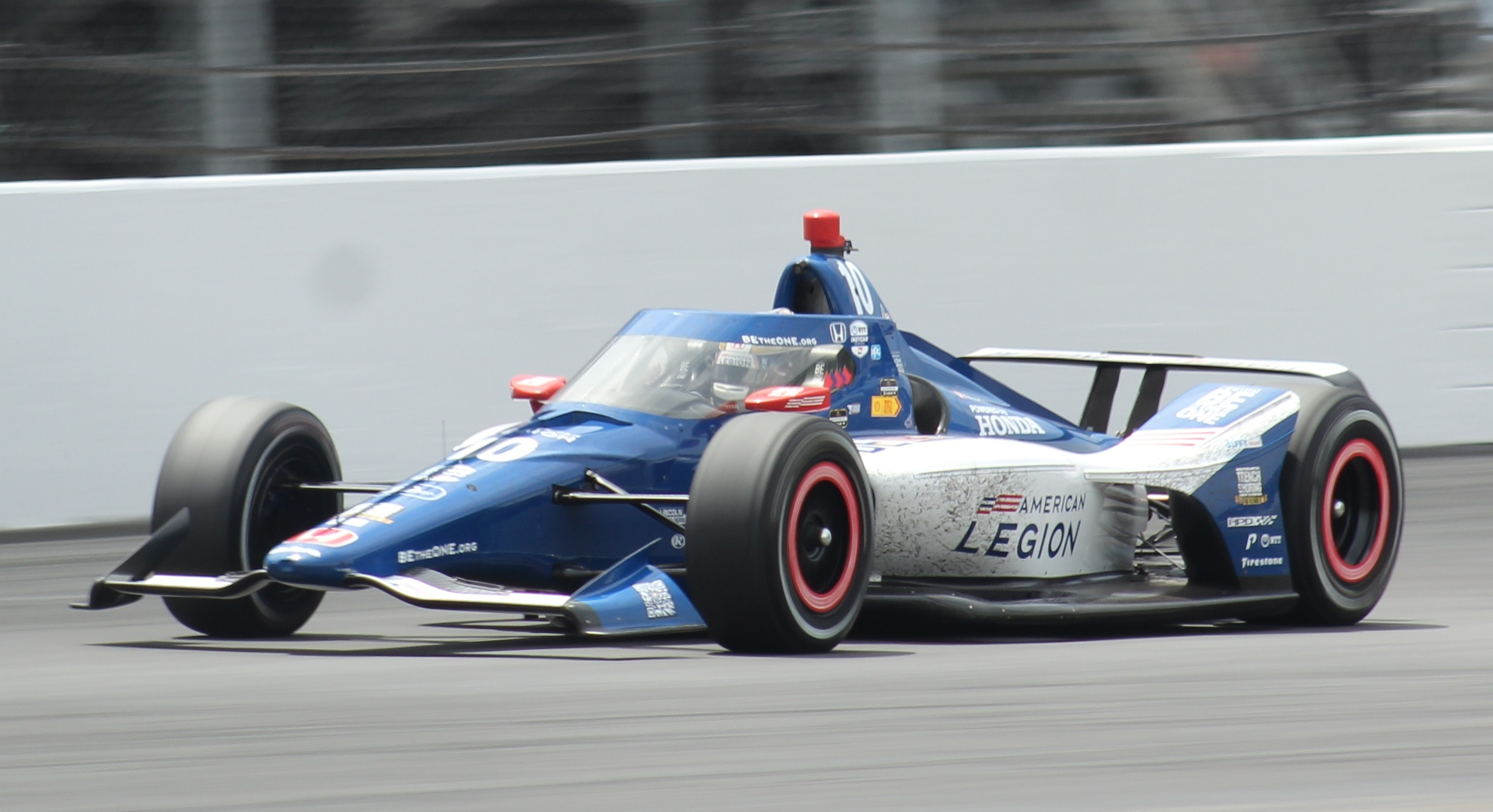
Palou took pole position for the 2023 Indianapolis 500 before finishing the race in fourth.

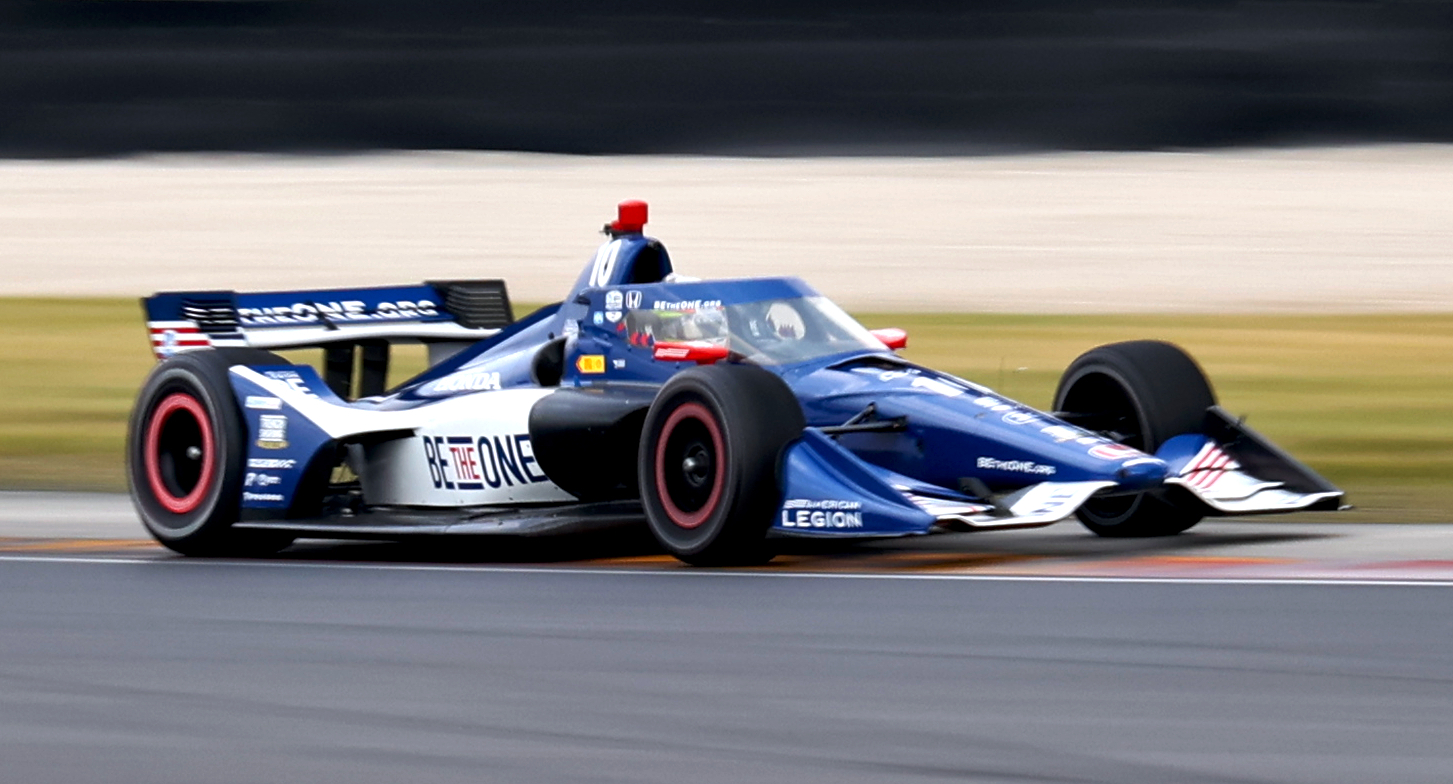
Palou during the 2023 Sonsio Grand Prix at Road America

==== 2023 ====
Palou started his season strongly, picking up top five finishes in four of the first five races and winning the GMR Grand Prix leading up to the 107th Indianapolis 500. During qualifying for the 500, Palou clinched the pole position with a new pole record speed of 234.217 mph, topping Scott Dixon's record set the previous year. Palou took his second victory of the season at the Detroit Grand Prix, and then won again at the following round in Road America, followed by a third consecutive win at Mid-Ohio. By winning the Grand Prix of Portland, he clinched his second IndyCar title a race early.

==== 2024 ====
Palou had another strong start to 2024, finishing in the top five in eight of the first ten points scoring races, picking up wins on the IMS Road Course and at Laguna Seca, and taking an early points lead in the championship. Although Palou only secured two points paying wins on the season, he also won the $1 Million Challenge, a non-championship event. He used consistency throughout the rest of the season to top Colton Herta, Will Power, and Scott McLaughlin for his third IndyCar Series championship, becoming the first Indy car driver to win back to back championships since Dario Franchitti did in 2009, 2010 and 2011 seasons.

==== 2025 ====
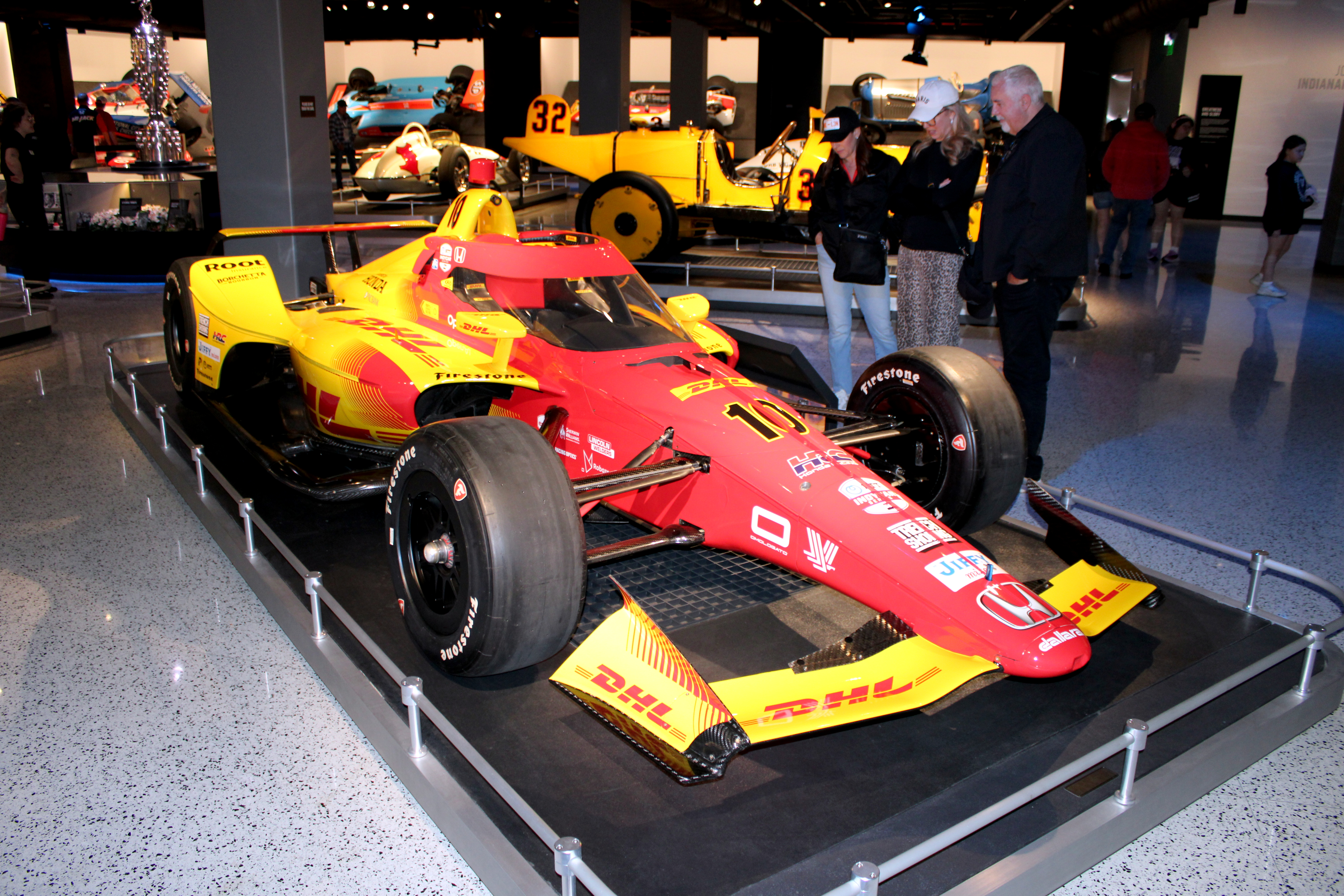
Álex Palou's 2025 DHL Chip Ganassi Racing Dallara IR-18 on display at the Indianapolis Motor Speedway Museum

Palou started the season with winning the first two rounds at St. Petersburg and Thermal. He later won three straight races in a row, with Barber, IMS Grand Prix, and the Indianapolis 500, becoming the first Spaniard to win the event and his first win on an oval. He later won at Road America after passing teammate Scott Dixon with two laps to go. At Mid-Ohio, Palou was leading Dixon by four seconds with six laps to go when he went off track, allowing Dixon to pass and take the win. Palou would win from pole at Iowa in Race 2, as well as Laguna Seca. After Portland, Palou clinched his third consecutive series title and fourth in his career, thus becoming the first IndyCar driver to have won both the Indianapolis 500 and the IndyCar championship in the same season since Dario Franchitti in 2010; he also became the first driver to win three consecutive IndyCar titles since Franchitti in 2009, 2010, and 2011.

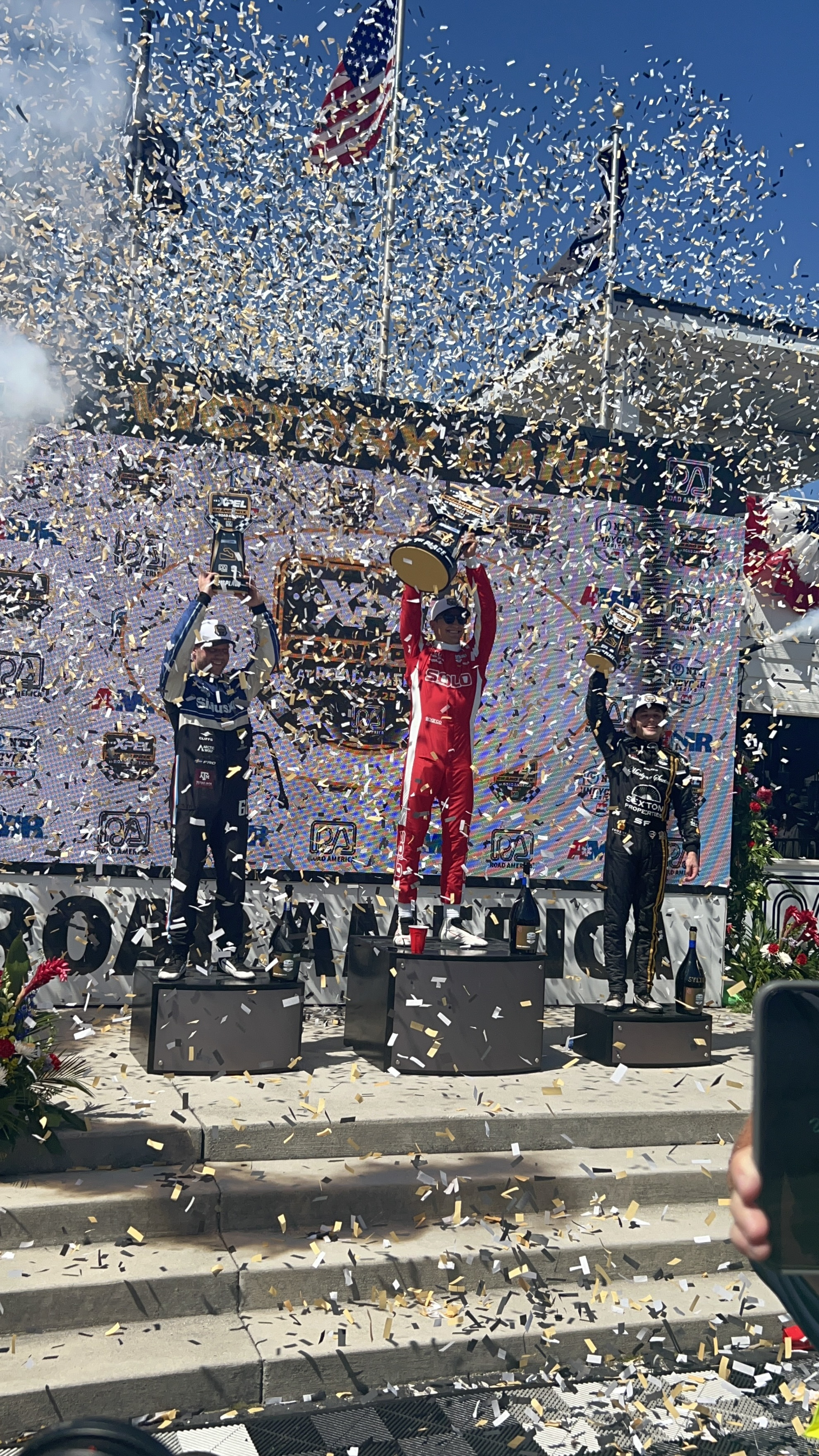
Palou celebrating at the podium after winning at Road America

==== 2026 ====
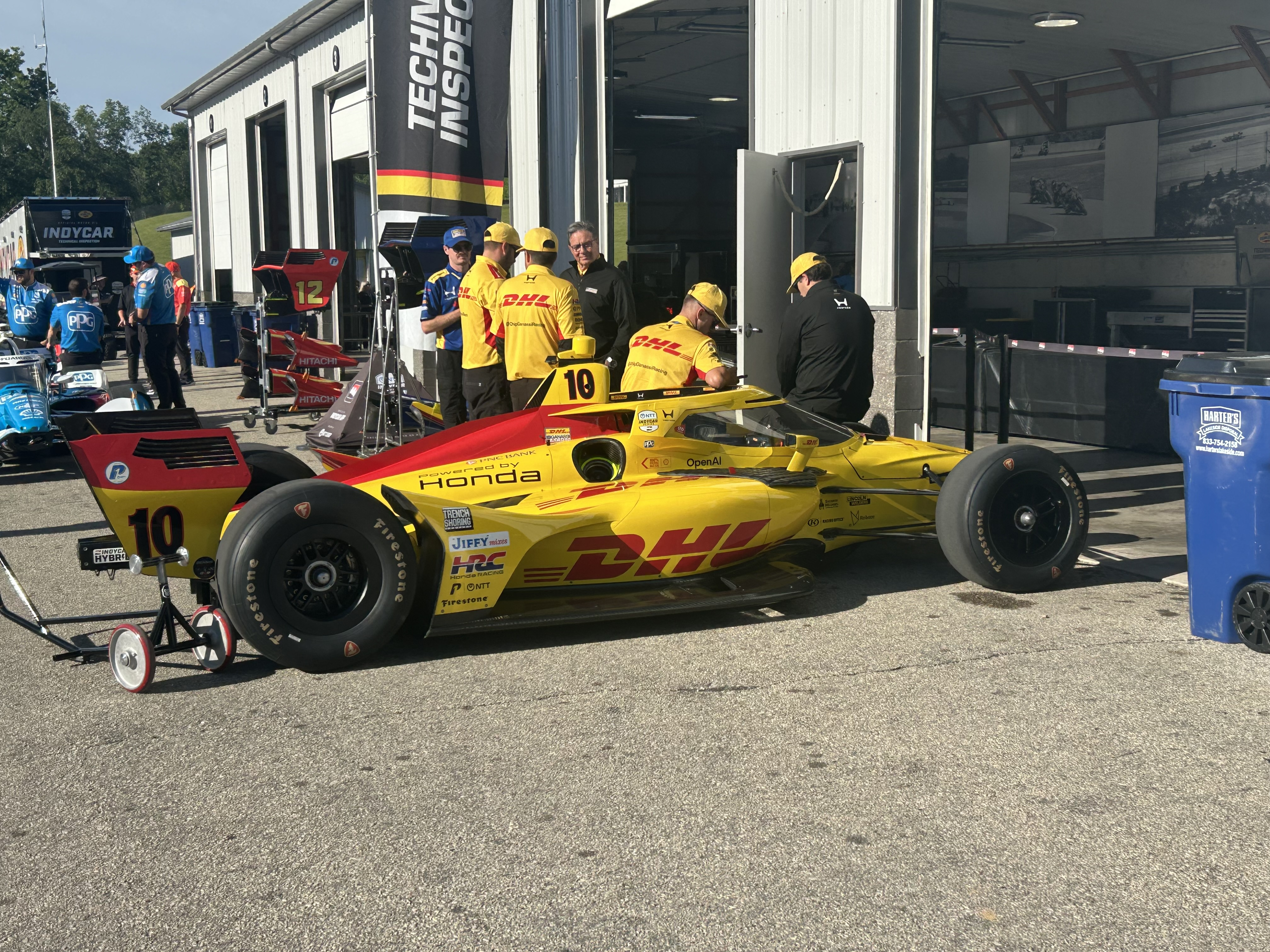
Palou's pole-sitting car at Road America in 2026.

Palou had another strong start to 2026, winning the first four out of eight rounds at St. Petersburg, Barber, Long Beach and Detroit. From the Indy Road Course to Road America, he won five-straight poles. On July 13, he went to the White House to help promote the Freedom 250 Grand Prix along with David Malukas and Felix Rosenqvist.

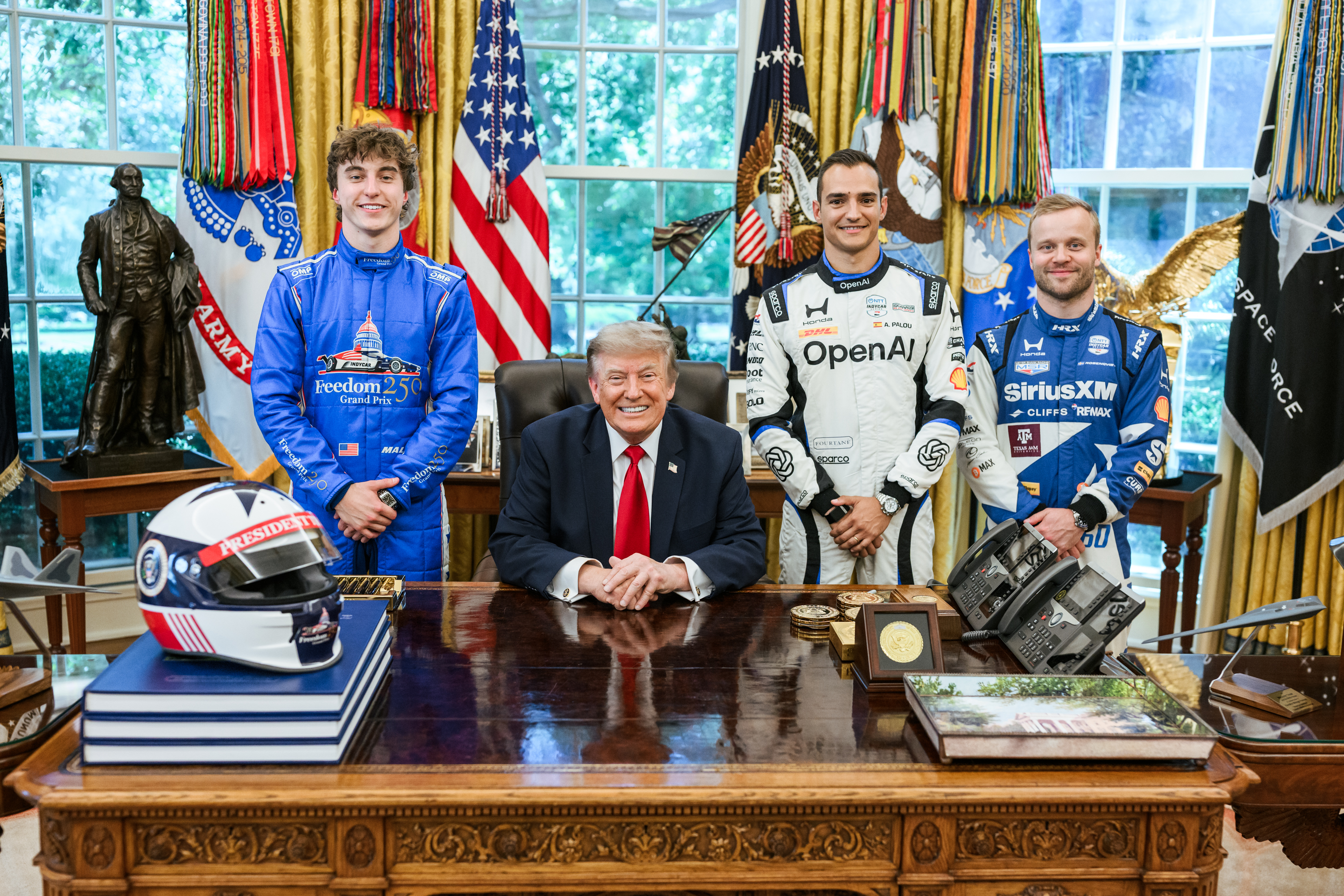
President Donald Trump (center) with three drivers involved in the race; from left to right: David Malukas, Palou and Felix Rosenqvist.

He also won at Nashville and Portland. At Milwaukee 1, Palou wrapped up his fifth series title.

== Formula One ==
In September 2022, McLaren announced that they had signed Palou to their Testing of Previous Cars program that would see him test the MCL35M, first at the Circuit de Barcelona-Catalunya, and later in October at the Red Bull Ring, both together with Pato O'Ward. Palou made his debut in free practice with McLaren at the 2022 United States Grand Prix. On his free practice debut, Palou called the F1 car "insane" and "capable of so much".

On 1 December 2022, McLaren announced Palou as a reserve driver for the 2023 Formula One World Championship. He drove the MCL35M during a test at the Hungaroring alongside Oscar Piastri.

== Other racing ventures ==
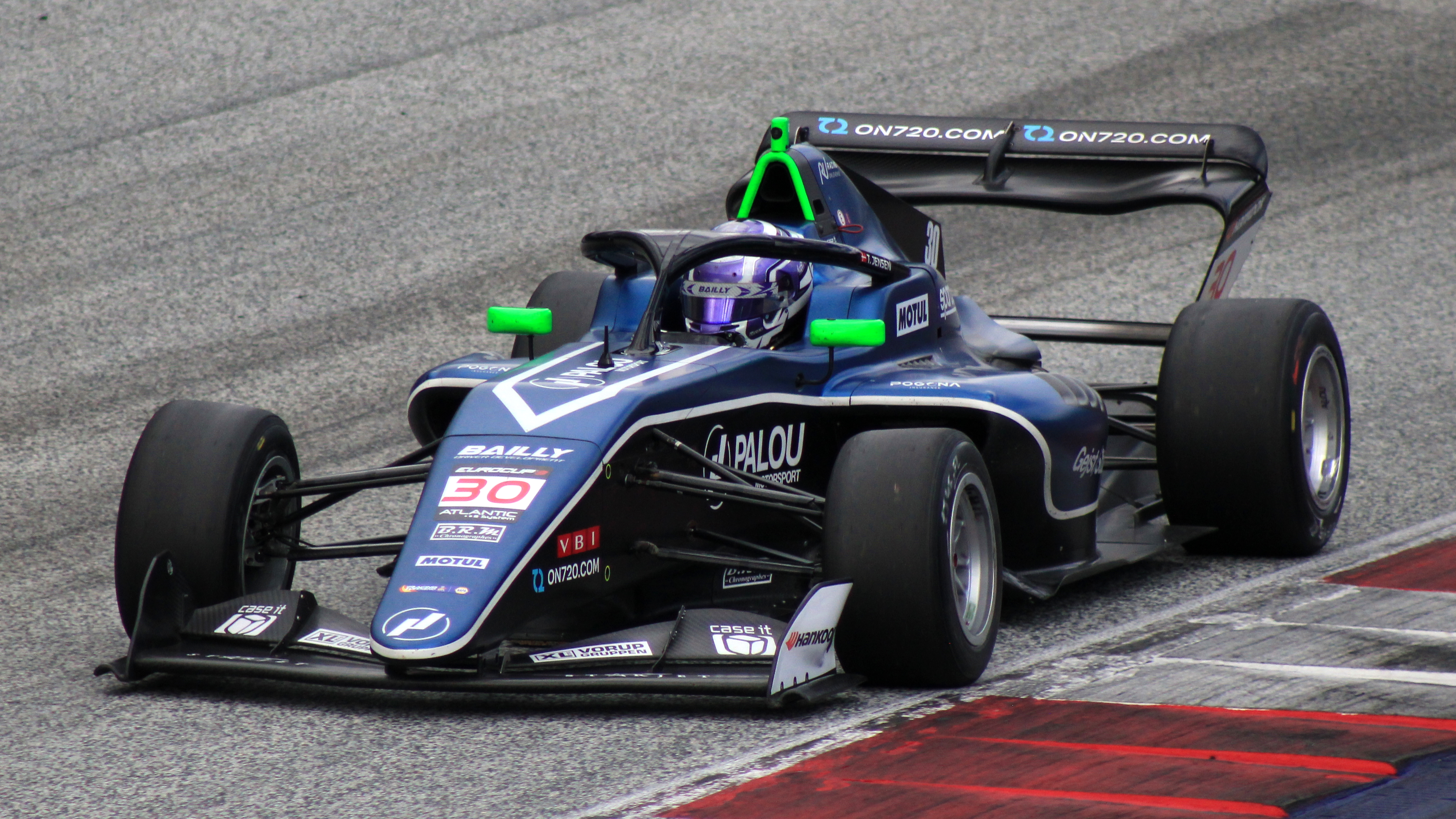
Theodor Jensen driving a Palou Motorsport car at the Red Bull Ring in 2024.

Palou owns a team in Eurocup-3 series called Palou Motorsport which currently fields four cars: the No. 16 driven by Filipina Bianca Bustamante, the No. 27 driven by Brazilian Heitor Dall'Agnol, the No. 33 driven by Frenchman Rafaël Pérard, and the No. 48 driven by American James Egozi. Palou Motorsport got three podiums in its debut season in 2023, all of them courtesy of Javier Sagrera. In 2025, the team won three races over the course of the Eurocup-3 Spanish Winter Championship and the main championship. All of those race wins were obtained by Egozi.

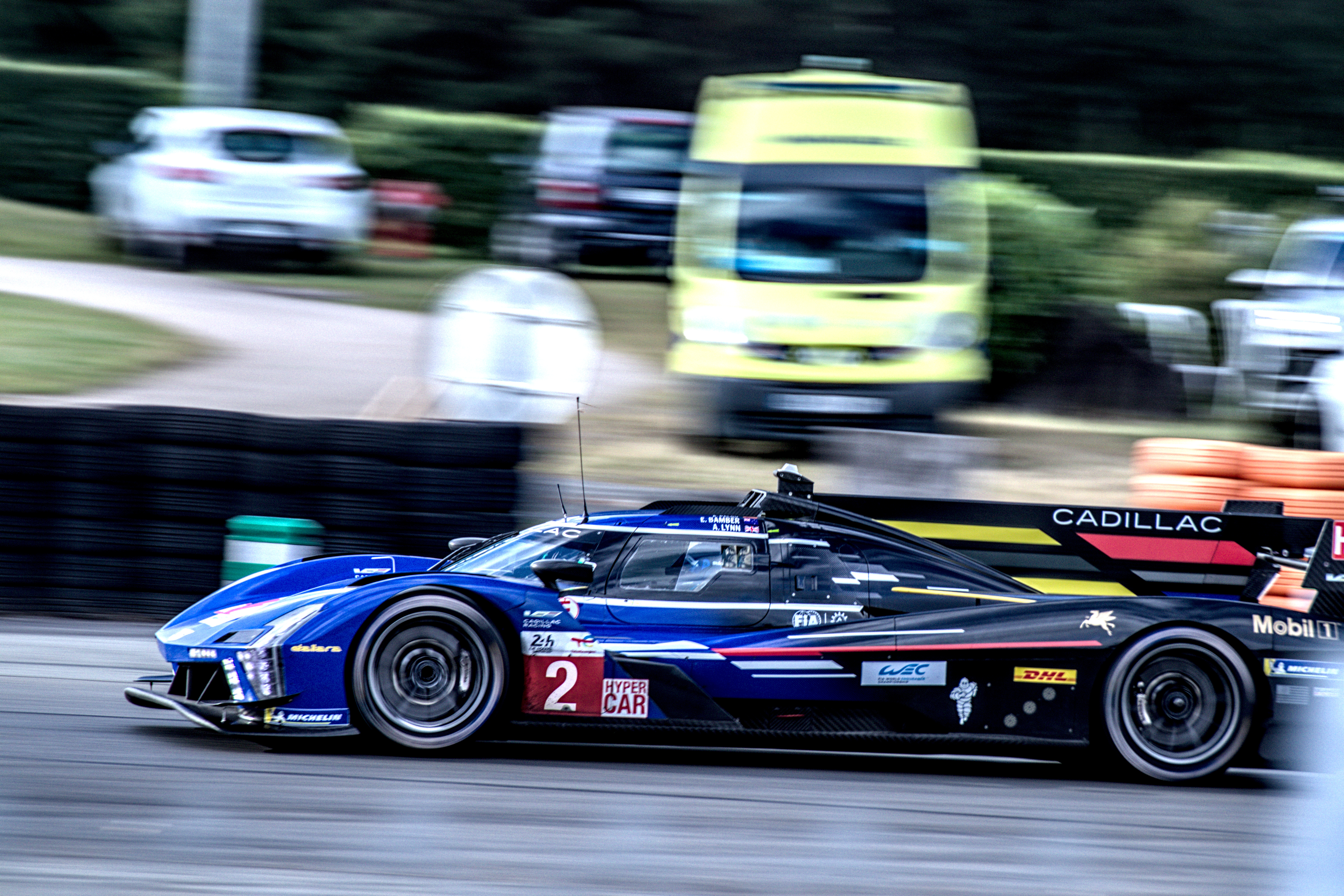
Palou's No.2 Chip Ganassi Racing Cadillac V-Series.R at the 2024 24 Hours of Le Mans.

Palou competed in the 2025 12 Hours of Sebring with Meyer Shank Racing in the GTP class.

== Personal life ==
On 4 December 2023, Palou and his wife Esther welcomed their first child. They reside in Indianapolis.

== Karting record ==
=== Karting career summary ===
Season	Series	Team	Position
2005	Spanish Championship — Alevín		3rd
2006	Spanish Championship — Alevín		1st
2006	Copa Campeones — Cadet		1st
2007	Trofeo delle Industrie — Minikart		8th
2008	Spanish Championship — Cadet		13th
2008	Torneo Industrie — Minikart	Ramon Palou	5th
2008	Euro Trophy — 60 Mini		2nd
2009	Spanish Championship — Cadet		3rd
2010	Spanish Championship — KF3		5th
2010	Copa Campeones — KF3		8th
2011	Spanish Championship — KF3		1st
2011	South Garda Winter Cup — KF3	Genikart Lpt	20th
2011	WSK Master Series — KF3		20th
2011	WSK Euro Series — KF3		14th
2011	CIK-FIA World Cup — KF3		8th
2012	Spanish Championship — KF3	CRG	1st
2012	Copa Campeones — KZ2	CRG	2nd
2012	South Garda Winter Cup — KF3	CRG	11th
2012	Andrea Margutti Trophy — KF3	CRG	3rd
2012	WSK Master Series — KF3	CRG	6th
2012	WSK Euro Series — KF3	CRG	1st
2012	CIK-FIA European Championship — KF3	CRG	2nd
2012	CIK-FIA World Cup — KF3	CRG	4th
2013	Spanish Championship — KF2	CRG	1st
2013	WSK Euro Series — KF	CRG	16th
2013	CIK-FIA European Championship — KF	CRG	10th
2013	CIK-FIA World Cup — KF	CRG	16th
2014	South Garda Winter Cup — KZ2	CRG	17th

== Racing record ==
=== Career summary ===
Season	Series	Team	Races	Wins	Poles	F/Laps	Podiums	Points	Position
2014	Euroformula Open Championship	Campos Racing	16	3	3	4	11	242	**3rd**
2014	Spanish Formula 3 Championship	Campos Racing	6	1	1	1	5	105	**2nd**
2014	Macau Grand Prix	Fortec Motorsports	1	0	0	0	0	N/A	16th
2014	BRDC Formula 4 Championship	Sean Walkinshaw Racing – Caterham F1	3	0	0	0	0	48	23rd
2015	GP3 Series	Campos Racing	18	1	0	1	1	51	10th
2015	Formula Renault 2.0 Northern European Cup	Inter Europol	1	0	0	0	0	0	NC
2016	GP3 Series	Campos Racing	18	0	0	0	1	22	15th
2016	Ferrari Challenge Europe - Trofeo Pirelli (Pro)	StileF Squadra Corse	2	1	2	1	2	39	7th
2017	Japanese Formula 3 Championship	Threebond with Drago Corse	20	3	5	3	10	102	**3rd**
2017	Macau Grand Prix	Threebond with Drago Corse	1	0	0	0	0	N/A	11th
2017	World Series Formula V8 3.5	Teo Martín Motorsport	6	1	3	1	3	68	10th
2017	FIA Formula 2 Championship	Campos Racing	4	0	0	0	0	5	21st
2018	FIA Formula 3 European Championship	Hitech Bullfrog GP	30	0	0	2	7	204	7th
2018	Macau Grand Prix	B-Max Racing Team	1	0	0	0	0	N/A	DNF
2019	Super GT - GT300	McLaren Customer Racing Japan	7	0	1	0	1	20	15th
2019	Super Formula	TCS Nakajima Racing	7	1	3	2	1	26	**3rd**
2020	IndyCar Series	Dale Coyne Racing with Team Goh	14	0	0	1	1	238	16th
2021	IndyCar Series	Chip Ganassi Racing	16	3	1	3	8	549	**1st**
2022	IndyCar Series	Chip Ganassi Racing	17	1	0	3	6	510	5th
2022	IMSA SportsCar Championship - DPi	Cadillac Racing	1	0	0	0	0	266	24th
2023	IndyCar Series	Chip Ganassi Racing	17	5	2	4	10	656	**1st**
2023	Formula One	McLaren F1 Team	Reserve driver						
2024	IndyCar Series	Chip Ganassi Racing	17	2	3	1	6	544	**1st**
2024	IMSA SportsCar Championship - GTP	Cadillac Racing	1	0	0	0	0	242	34th
2024	FIA World Endurance Championship - Hypercar	Cadillac Racing	1	0	0	0	0	12	26th
2024	GT World Challenge America - Pro	Mercedes-AMG Team Lone Star Racing	1	0	0	0	0	0	NC†
2025	IndyCar Series	Chip Ganassi Racing	17	8	6	5	14	711	**1st**
2025	IMSA SportsCar Championship - GTP	Acura Meyer Shank Racing w/ Curb-Agajanian	2	0	0	0	1	587	28th
2026	IndyCar Series	Chip Ganassi Racing	18	6	8	2	7	631	**1st**
2026	IMSA SportsCar Championship - GTP	Acura Meyer Shank Racing w/ Curb-Agajanian	3	0	1	0	0	809	21st
2026	GT World Challenge America - Pro	Mercedes-AMG Team Lone Star Racing	1	0	0	0	0	0	NC†

^{†} As Palou was a guest driver, he was ineligible for points.

=== Complete Euroformula Open Championship results ===
(key) (Races in bold indicate pole position) (Races in italics indicate fastest lap)

Year	Entrant	1	2	3	4	5	6	7	8	9	10	11	12	13	14	15	16	Pos	Points
2014	Campos Racing	**NÜR**; **1**; 1	NÜR; 2 Ret	ALG; 1; 3	ALG; 2; 3	JER; 1; 4	JER; 2; 2	HUN; 1; 2	HUN; 2; 1	**SIL**; **1**; 2	SIL; 2; 2	SPA; 1; 2	SPA; 2; 5	MNZ; 1 Ret	MNZ; 2; 16	CAT; 1; 2	**CAT**; **2**; 1	3rd	242

=== Complete GP3 Series results ===
(key) (Races in bold indicate pole position) (Races in italics indicate fastest lap)

Year	Entrant	1	2	3	4	5	6	7	8	9	10	11	12	13	14	15	16	17	18	Pos	Points
2015	Campos Racing	CAT; FEA; 12	CAT; SPR; 20	RBR; FEA; 14	RBR; SPR; Ret	SIL; FEA; Ret	SIL; SPR; 13	HUN; FEA; 19	HUN; SPR; 18	SPA; FEA; 7	SPA; SPR; 5	MNZ; FEA; 7	MNZ; SPR; 10	SOC; FEA; 4	SOC; SPR; 9	BHR; FEA; Ret	BHR; SPR; 10	YMC; FEA; 8	YMC; SPR; 1	10th	51
2016	Campos Racing	CAT; FEA; 19	CAT; SPR; 14	RBR; FEA; 16	RBR; SPR; 11	SIL; FEA; 10	SIL; SPR; 2	HUN; FEA; 11	HUN; SPR; 14	HOC; FEA; 16	HOC; SPR; 19†	SPA; FEA; 13	SPA; SPR; 11	MNZ; FEA; 11	MNZ; SPR; 7	SEP; FEA; 14	SEP; SPR; 19	YMC; FEA; 10	YMC; SPR; 5	15th	22

^{†} Driver did not finish the race but was classified as he completed over 90% of the race distance.

=== Complete Japanese Formula 3 Championship results ===
(key) (Races in bold indicate pole position; races in italics indicate fastest lap)

Year	Team	1	2	3	4	5	6	7	8	9	10	11	12	13	14	15	16	17	18	19	20	Pos	Points
2017	Threebond with Drago Corse	**OKA1**; **1**; 4	**OKA1**; **2**; 1	OKA1; 3; 2	SUZ1; 1; 2	SUZ1; 2; 2	**FUJ1**; **1**; 1	**FUJ1**; **2**; 4	OKA2; 1; 8	**OKA2**; **2**; 1	SUZ2; 1; 4	SUZ2; 2; 2	FUJ2; 1; 3	FUJ2; 2; 4	MOT; 1 Ret	MOT; 2; 3	MOT; 3; 7	AUT; 1; 2	AUT; 2; 4	SUG; 1; 5	SUG; 2; 5	3rd	102

=== Complete World Series Formula V8 3.5 results ===
(key) (Races in bold indicate pole position; races in italics indicate fastest lap)

Year	Team	1	2	3	4	5	6	7	8	9	10	11	12	13	14	15	16	17	18	Pos	Points
2017	Teo Martín Motorsport	SIL; 1	SIL; 2	SPA; 1	SPA; 2	MNZ; 1	MNZ; 2	JER; 1	JER; 2	ALC; 1	ALC; 2	**NÜR**; **1**; 11	**NÜR**; **2**; 1	MEX; 1; 3	MEX; 2 Ret	COA; 1; 5	**COA**; **2**; 2	BHR; 1	BHR; 2	10th	68

=== Complete FIA Formula 2 Championship results ===
(key) (Races in bold indicate pole position) (Races in italics indicate points for the fastest lap of top ten finishers)

Year	Entrant	1	2	3	4	5	6	7	8	9	10	11	12	13	14	15	16	17	18	19	20	21	22	DC	Points
2017	Campos Racing	BHR; FEA	BHR; SPR	CAT; FEA	CAT; SPR	MON; FEA	MON; SPR	BAK; FEA	BAK; SPR	RBR; FEA	RBR; SPR	SIL; FEA	SIL; SPR	HUN; FEA	HUN; SPR	SPA; FEA	SPA; SPR	MNZ; FEA	MNZ; SPR	JER; FEA; 8	JER; SPR; 8	YMC; FEA; 12	YMC; SPR; 12	21st	5

=== Complete Macau Grand Prix results ===
Year	Team	Car	Qualifying	Quali Race	Main race	Ref
2017	(Japan) ThreeBond Racing with Drago Corse	Dallara F314	21st	18th	11th	
2018	(Japan) B-Max Racing Team	Dallara F312	13th	12th	DNF	

=== Complete FIA Formula 3 European Championship results ===
(key) (Races in bold indicate pole position) (Races in italics indicate fastest lap)

Year	Entrant	Engine	1	2	3	4	5	6	7	8	9	10	11	12	13	14	15	16	17	18	19	20	21	22	23	24	25	26	27	28	29	30	DC	Points
2018	Hitech Bullfrog GP	Mercedes	PAU; 1; 7	PAU; 2; 2	PAU; 3; 19	HUN; 1; 12	HUN; 2; 3	HUN; 3 Ret	NOR; 1; 11	NOR; 2; 4	NOR; 3 Ret	ZAN; 1; 10	ZAN; 2; 4	ZAN; 3; 6	SPA; 1; 2	SPA; 2; 11	SPA; 3; 9	SIL; 1; 7	SIL; 2; 11	SIL; 3; 7	MIS; 1; 8	MIS; 2; 2	MIS; 3; 6	NÜR; 1 Ret	NÜR; 2; 6	NÜR; 3; 3	RBR; 1; 3	RBR; 2 Ret	RBR; 3; 10	HOC; 1; 4	HOC; 2; 8	HOC; 3; 3	7th	204

=== Complete Super GT results ===
(key) (Races in bold indicate pole position; races in italics indicate fastest lap)

Year	Team	Car	Class	1	2	3	4	5	6	7	8	DC	Points
2019	McLaren Customer Racing Japan	McLaren 720S GT3	GT300	OKA; 19	FUJ; 14	SUZ; 13	CHA	FUJ; Ret	AUT; 2	SUG; 12	**MOT**; 7	15th	20

=== Complete Super Formula results ===
(key) (Races in bold indicate pole position) (Races in italics indicate fastest lap)

Year	Entrant	Engine	1	2	3	4	5	6	7	DC	Points
2019	TCS Nakajima Racing	Honda	SUZ; Ret	AUT; 6	SUG; 13	**FUJ**; 1	**MOT**; 4	OKA; 4	**SUZ**; 19	3rd	26

=== Complete Formula One participations ===
(key) (Races in bold indicate pole position) (Races in italics indicate fastest lap)

Year	Entrant	Chassis	Engine	1	2	3	4	5	6	7	8	9	10	11	12	13	14	15	16	17	18	19	20	21	22	WDC	Points
2022	McLaren F1 Team	McLaren MCL36	Mercedes AMG F1 M13 E Performance V6 t	BHR	SAU	AUS	EMI	MIA	ESP	MON	AZE	CAN	GBR	AUT	FRA	HUN	BEL	NED	ITA	SIN	JPN	USA; TD	MXC	SAP	ABU	–	–

=== American open-wheel racing results ===
(key) (Races in bold indicate pole position) (Races in italics indicate fastest lap)

==== IndyCar Series ====
(key)

Year	Team	No.	Chassis	Engine	1	2	3	4	5	6	7	8	9	10	11	12	13	14	15	16	17	18	Rank	Points	Ref
2020	Dale Coyne Racing w/ Team Goh	55	Dallara DW12	Honda	TXS; 23	IMS; 19	ROA; 3	ROA; 7	IOW; 11	IOW; 14	INDY; 28	GTW; 15	GTW; 12	MOH; 12	MOH; 23	IMS; 17	IMS; 9	STP; 13					16th	238	
2021	Chip Ganassi Racing	10	Dallara DW12	Honda	ALA; 1*	STP; 17	**TXS**; 4	TXS; 7	IMS; 3	INDY; 2	DET; 15	DET; 3	ROA; 1	MOH; 3	NSH; 7	IMS; 27	GTW; 20	**POR**; 1	LAG; 2	LBH; 4			1st	549	
2022	Chip Ganassi Racing	10	Dallara DW12	Honda	STP; 2	TXS; 7	LBH; 3	ALA; 2	IMS; 18	INDY; 9	DET; 6	ROA; 27	MOH; 2	TOR; 6	IOW; 6	IOW; 13	IMS; 10	NSH; 3*	GTW; 9	POR; 12	LAG; 1*		5th	510	
2023	Chip Ganassi Racing	10	Dallara DW12	Honda	STP; 8	TXS; 3	LBH; 5	ALA; 5	IMS; 1*	**INDY**; 4	**DET**; 1*	ROA; 1	MOH; 1*	TOR; 2	IOW; 8	IOW; 3	NSH; 3	IMS; 7	GTW; 7	POR; 1*	LAG; 3*		1st	656	
2024	Chip Ganassi Racing	10	Dallara DW12	Honda	STP; 4	**THE^{1}** 1*	LBH; 3	ALA; 5	**IMS**; 1*	INDY; 5	DET; 16	ROA; 4	**LAG**; 1*	**MOH**; 2*	IOW; 23	IOW; 2*	TOR; 4	GTW; 4	POR; 2	MIL; 5	MIL; 19	NSH; 11	1st	544	
2025	Chip Ganassi Racing	10	Dallara DW12	Honda	STP; 1	THE; 1	LBH; 2	**ALA**; 1*	**IMS**; 1	INDY; 1	DET; 25	GTW; 8	ROA; 1	**MOH**; 2*	IOW; 5	**IOW**; 1*	TOR; 12*	**LAG**; 1*	POR; 3	**MIL**; 2*	NSH; 2		1st	711	
2026	Chip Ganassi Racing	10	Dallara DW12	Honda	STP; 1*	PHX; 24	ARL; 2	**ALA**; 1*	LBH; 1	**IMS**; 5	**INDY**; 7*	**DET**; 1*	**GTW**; 17	**ROA**; 5	MOH; 5	NSH; 1*	POR; 1*	MRK; 4	**WSH**; 20	MIL; 10	**MIL**; 5*	LAG; 8	1st	631	

* Season still in progress.

- ^{1} Non-points-paying, exhibition race.

==== Indianapolis 500 ====
Year	Chassis	Engine	Start	Finish	Team
2020	Dallara	Honda	7	28	Dale Coyne Racing w/ Team Goh
2021	Dallara	Honda	6	2	Chip Ganassi Racing
2022	Dallara	Honda	2	9	Chip Ganassi Racing
2023	Dallara	Honda	**1**	4	Chip Ganassi Racing
2024	Dallara	Honda	14	5	Chip Ganassi Racing
2025	Dallara	Honda	6	**1**	Chip Ganassi Racing
2026	Dallara	Honda	**1**	7	Chip Ganassi Racing

=== Complete IMSA SportsCar Championship results ===
(key) (Races in bold indicate pole position; races in italics indicate fastest lap)

Year	Entrant	Class	Make	Engine	1	2	3	4	5	6	7	8	9	10	Rank	Points	Ref
2022	Cadillac Racing	DPi	Cadillac DPi-V.R	Cadillac 5.5 L V8	DAY; 7	SEB	LBH	LGA	MOH	DET	WGL	MOS	ELK	PET	24th	266	
2024	Cadillac Racing	GTP	Cadillac V-Series.R	Cadillac LMC55R 5. 5 L V8	DAY; 10	SEB	LBH	LGA	DET	WGL	ELK	IMS	PET		34th	242	
2025	Acura Meyer Shank Racing w/Curb-Agajanian	GTP	Acura ARX-06	Acura AR24e 2.4 L turbo V6	DAY; 8	SEB; 3	LBH	LGA	DET	WGL	ELK	IMS	PET		28th	587	
2026	Acura Meyer Shank Racing w/Curb-Agajanian	GTP	Acura ARX-06	Acura AR24e 2.4 L Turbo V6	**DAY**; 5	SEB; 6	LBH	LGA	DET	WGL	ELK	IMS	PET; 10		21st	809	

=== 24 Hours of Daytona results ===
Year	Team	Co-drivers	Car	Class	Laps	Pos.	Class Pos.
2022	(United States) Cadillac Racing	(France) Sébastien Bourdais (New Zealand) Scott Dixon (Netherlands) Renger van der Zande	Cadillac DPi-V.R	DPi	722	14th	7th
2024	(United States) Cadillac Racing	(France) Sébastien Bourdais (New Zealand) Scott Dixon (Netherlands) Renger van der Zande	Cadillac V-Series.R	GTP	423	47th	10th
2025	(United States) Acura Meyer Shank Racing w/Curb-Agajanian	(Japan) Kakunoshin Ohta (Netherlands) Renger van der Zande (United Kingdom) Nick Yelloly	Acura ARX-06	GTP	741	14th	14th
2026	(United States) Acura Meyer Shank Racing w/Curb-Agajanian	(Japan) Kakunoshin Ohta (Netherlands) Renger van der Zande (United Kingdom) Nick Yelloly	Acura ARX-06	GTP	705	5th	5th

=== Complete FIA World Endurance Championship results ===
(key) (Races in bold indicate pole position; races in italics indicate fastest lap)

Year	Entrant	Class	Car	Engine	1	2	3	4	5	6	7	8	Rank	Points
2024	Cadillac Racing	Hypercar	Cadillac V-Series.R	Cadillac LMC55R 5.5 L V8	QAT	IMO	SPA	LMS; 7	SAP	COA	FUJ	BHR	26th	12

=== Complete 24 Hours of Le Mans results ===
Year	Team	Co-Drivers	Car	Class	Laps	Pos.	Class Pos.
2024	(United States) Cadillac Racing	(New Zealand) Earl Bamber (United Kingdom) Alex Lynn	Cadillac V-Series.R	Hypercar	311	7th	7th

Sporting positions
Preceded by Nobuharu Matsushita	Super Formula; Rookie Champion; 2019	Succeeded by Toshiki Oyu
Preceded by Scott Dixon	IndyCar Series; Champion; 2021	Succeeded by Will Power
Preceded by Will Power	IndyCar Series; Champion; 2023–2026	Succeeded by Incumbent
Preceded by Josef Newgarden	Indianapolis 500; Winner; 2025	Succeeded by Felix Rosenqvist
