= 2023 Sonsio Grand Prix at Road America =

Indycar race held in Elkhart Lake, Wisconsin

(United States) 2023 Sonsio Grand Prix at Road America
Race details
8th round of the 2023 IndyCar season
| ← Previous race | Next race → |
- Layout of the Road America circuit
- Date: June 18, 2023
- Official name: Sonsio Grand Prix at Road America
- Location: Road America, Elkhart Lake, Wisconsin
- Course: Permanent road course 4.014 mi / 6.460 km
- Distance: 55 laps 220.55 mi / 354.94 km

Pole position
- Driver: (United States) Colton Herta (Andretti Autosport with Curb-Agajanian)
- Time: 01:40.1945

Fastest lap
- Driver: (Australia) Will Power (Team Penske)
- Time: 01:42.8921 (on lap 45 of 55)

Podium
- First: (Spain) Álex Palou (Chip Ganassi Racing)
- Second: (United States) Josef Newgarden (Team Penske)
- Third: (Mexico) Pato O'Ward (Arrow McLaren)

Chronology
| Previous | Next |
|---|---|
| 2022 | 2024 |

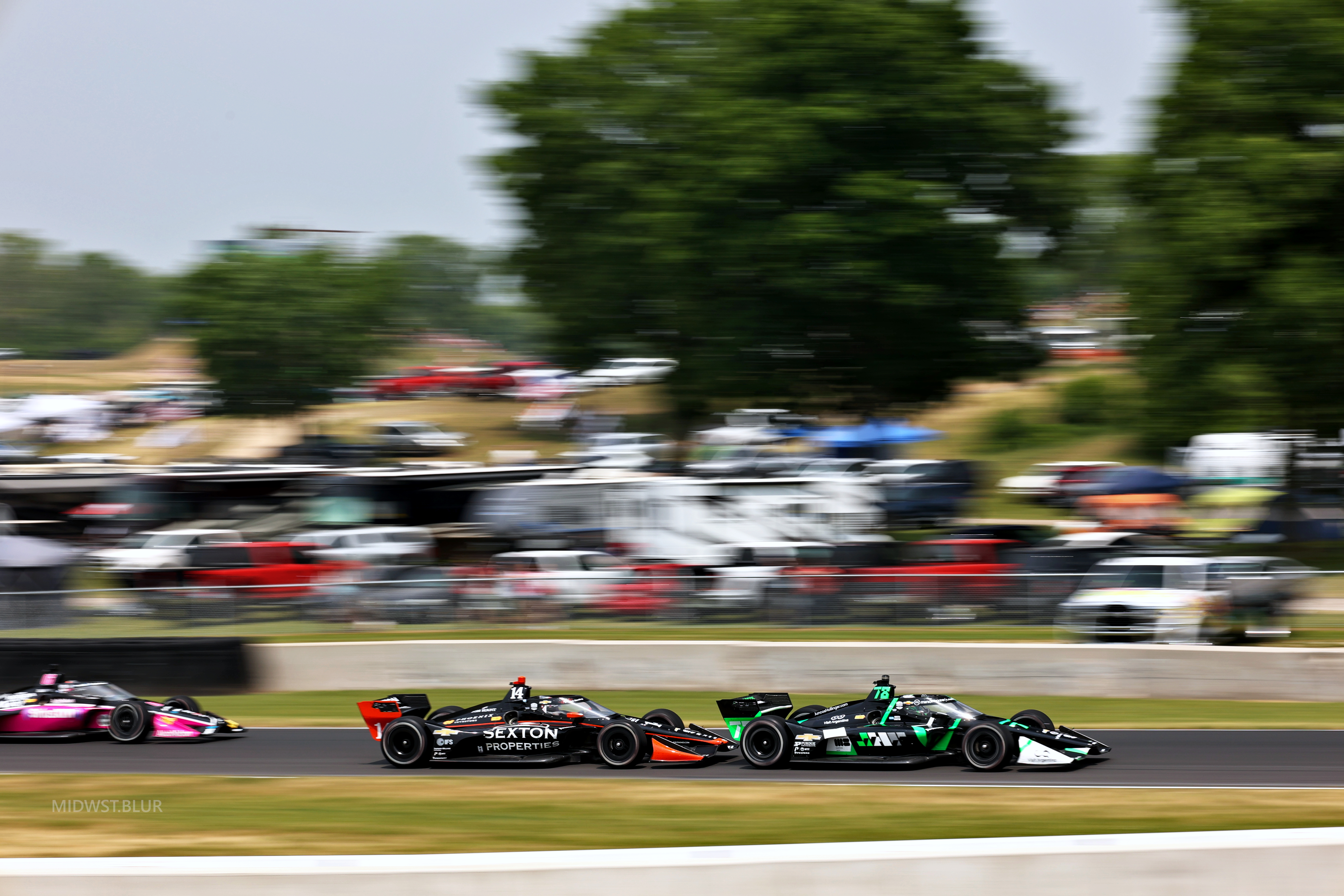
2023 Sonsio Grand Prix at Road America

The 2023 Sonsio Grand Prix at Road America presented by AMR was the eighth round of the 2023 IndyCar season. The race was held on June 18, 2023, in Elkhart Lake, Wisconsin at Road America. The race consisted of 55 laps and was won by Álex Palou.

Unbeknownst to all, this would be the final race of the season for Simon Pagenaud as during practice for the next round, Pagenaud would have a horrific crash that would end his season and tenure with Meyer/Shank Racing due to lingering injuries.

== Entry list ==
| Key | Meaning |
|---|---|
| R | Rookie |
| W | Past winner |

| No. | Driver | Team | Engine |
|---|---|---|---|
| 2 | (United States) Josef Newgarden W | Team Penske | Chevrolet |
| 3 | (New Zealand) Scott McLaughlin | Team Penske | Chevrolet |
| 5 | (Mexico) Patricio O'Ward | Arrow McLaren | Chevrolet |
| 06 | (Brazil) Hélio Castroneves | Meyer Shank Racing | Honda |
| 6 | (Sweden) Felix Rosenqvist W | Arrow McLaren | Chevrolet |
| 7 | (United States) Alexander Rossi W | Arrow McLaren | Chevrolet |
| 8 | (Sweden) Marcus Ericsson | Chip Ganassi Racing | Honda |
| 9 | (New Zealand) Scott Dixon W | Chip Ganassi Racing | Honda |
| 10 | (Spain) Álex Palou W | Chip Ganassi Racing | Honda |
| 11 | (New Zealand) Marcus Armstrong R | Chip Ganassi Racing | Honda |
| 12 | (Australia) Will Power W | Team Penske | Chevrolet |
| 14 | (United States) Santino Ferrucci | A.J. Foyt Enterprises | Chevrolet |
| 15 | (United States) Graham Rahal | Rahal Letterman Lanigan Racing | Honda |
| 18 | (United States) David Malukas | Dale Coyne Racing with HMD Motorsports | Honda |
| 20 | (United States) Ryan Hunter-Reay | Ed Carpenter Racing | Chevrolet |
| 21 | (Netherlands) Rinus VeeKay | Ed Carpenter Racing | Chevrolet |
| 26 | (United States) Colton Herta | Andretti Autosport with Curb-Agajanian | Honda |
| 27 | (United States) Kyle Kirkwood | Andretti Autosport | Honda |
| 28 | (France) Romain Grosjean | Andretti Autosport | Honda |
| 29 | (Canada) Devlin DeFrancesco | Andretti Steinbrenner Autosport | Honda |
| 30 | (United Kingdom) Jack Harvey | Rahal Letterman Lanigan Racing | Honda |
| 45 | (Denmark) Christian Lundgaard | Rahal Letterman Lanigan Racing | Honda |
| 51 | (United States) Sting Ray Robb R | Dale Coyne Racing with Rick Ware Racing | Honda |
| 55 | (Denmark) Benjamin Pedersen R | A.J. Foyt Enterprises | Chevrolet |
| 60 | (France) Simon Pagenaud | Meyer Shank Racing | Honda |
| 77 | (United Kingdom) Callum Ilott | Juncos Hollinger Racing | Chevrolet |
| 78 | (Argentina) Agustín Canapino R | Juncos Hollinger Racing | Chevrolet |

== Practice ==
=== Practice 1 ===
Top practice speeds
| Pos | No. | Driver | Team | Engine | Lap time |
|---|---|---|---|---|---|
| 1 | 7 | (United States) Alexander Rossi W | Arrow McLaren | Chevrolet | 01:41.7790 |
| 2 | 18 | (United States) David Malukas | Dale Coyne Racing with HMD Motorsports | Honda | 01:41.8652 |
| 3 | 10 | (Spain) Álex Palou W | Chip Ganassi Racing | Honda | 01:41.9486 |

=== Practice 2 ===
Top practice speeds
| Pos | No. | Driver | Team | Engine | Lap time |
|---|---|---|---|---|---|
| 1 | 7 | (United States) Alexander Rossi W | Arrow McLaren | Chevrolet | 01:40.9112 |
| 2 | 26 | (United States) Colton Herta | Andretti Autosport with Curb-Agajanian | Honda | 01:41.0584 |
| 3 | 6 | (Sweden) Felix Rosenqvist W | Arrow McLaren | Chevrolet | 01:41.2572 |

== Qualifying ==
=== Qualifying classification ===
| Pos | No. | Driver | Team | Engine | Time | | | | Final grid |
| Pos | No. | Driver | Team | Engine | Round 1 | | Round 2 | Round 3 | Final grid |
| Pos | No. | Driver | Team | Engine | Group 1 | Group 2 | Round 2 | Round 3 | Final grid |
|---|---|---|---|---|---|---|---|---|---|
| 1 | 26 | (United States) Colton Herta | Andretti Autosport with Curb-Agajanian | Honda | **01:40.5881** | N/A | **01:40.5476** | **01:40.1945** | 1 |
| 2 | 5 | (Mexico) Pato O'Ward | Arrow McLaren | Chevrolet | N/A | **01:40.9158** | 01:40.9393 | 01:40.3643 | 2 |
| 3 | 10 | (Spain) Álex Palou **W** | Chip Ganassi Racing | Honda | N/A | 01:41.2868 | 01:40.5572 | 01:40.4930 | 3 |
| 4 | 2 | (United States) Josef Newgarden **W** | Team Penske | Chevrolet | 01:41.3132 | N/A | 01:40.9716 | 01:40.9530 | 4 |
| 5 | 7 | (United States) Alexander Rossi **W** | Arrow McLaren | Chevrolet | N/A | 01:41.1788 | 01:40.9948 | 01:41.1854 | 5 |
| 6 | 27 | (United States) Kyle Kirkwood | Andretti Autosport | Honda | 01:41.4400 | N/A | 01:40.9322 | No Time | 6 |
| 7 | 45 | (Denmark) Christian Lundgaard | Rahal Letterman Lanigan Racing | Honda | N/A | 01:41.0125 | 01:41.0480 | N/A | 7 |
| 8 | 11 | (New Zealand) Marcus Armstrong **R** | Chip Ganassi Racing | Honda | N/A | 01:41.0682 | 01:41.1737 | N/A | 8 |
| 9 | 8 | (Sweden) Marcus Ericsson | Chip Ganassi Racing | Honda | N/A | 01:41.2830 | 01:41.2202 | N/A | 9 |
| 10 | 55 | (Denmark) Benjamin Pedersen **R** | A. J. Foyt Enterprises | Chevrolet | 01:41.2255 | N/A | 01:41.4989 | N/A | 10 |
| 11 | 14 | (United States) Santino Ferrucci | A. J. Foyt Enterprises | Chevrolet | 01:41.4723 | N/A | 01:41.6314 | N/A | 11 |
| 12 | 29 | (Canada) Devlin DeFrancesco | Andretti Steinbrenner Autosport | Honda | 01:41.2443 | N/A | 01:41.8277 | N/A | 12 |
| 13 | 18 | (United States) David Malukas | Dale Coyne Racing with HMD Motorsports | Honda | 01:41.5204 | N/A | N/A | N/A | 13 |
| 14 | 15 | (United States) Graham Rahal | Rahal Letterman Lanigan Racing | Honda | N/A | 01:41.5121 | N/A | N/A | 14 |
| 15 | 21 | (Netherlands) Rinus VeeKay | Ed Carpenter Racing | Chevrolet | 01:41.7420 | N/A | N/A | N/A | 15 |
| 16 | 6 | (Sweden) Felix Rosenqvist **W** | Arrow McLaren | Chevrolet | N/A | 01:41.5823 | N/A | N/A | 16 |
| 17 | 77 | (United Kingdom) Callum Ilott | Juncos Hollinger Racing | Chevrolet | 01:41.8005 | N/A | N/A | N/A | 17 |
| 18 | 3 | (New Zealand) Scott McLaughlin | Team Penske | Chevrolet | N/A | 01:41.7005 | N/A | N/A | 18 |
| 19 | 28 | (France) Romain Grosjean | Andretti Autosport | Honda | 01:41.8529 | N/A | N/A | N/A | 19 |
| 20 | 60 | (France) Simon Pagenaud | Meyer Shank Racing | Honda | N/A | 01:41.7257 | N/A | N/A | 20 |
| 21 | 78 | (Argentina) Agustín Canapino **R** | Juncos Hollinger Racing | Chevrolet | 01:41.9247 | N/A | N/A | N/A | 21 |
| 22 | 12 | (Australia) Will Power **W** | Team Penske | Chevrolet | N/A | 01:41.9275 | N/A | N/A | 22 |
| 23 | 9 | (New Zealand) Scott Dixon **W** | Chip Ganassi Racing | Honda | 01:42.2745 | N/A | N/A | N/A | 23 |
| 24 | 30 | (United Kingdom) Jack Harvey | Rahal Letterman Lanigan Racing | Honda | N/A | 01:41.9329 | N/A | N/A | 24 |
| 25 | 51 | (United States) Sting Ray Robb **R** | Dale Coyne Racing with Rick Ware Racing | Honda | 01:42.6862 | N/A | N/A | N/A | 25 |
| 26 | 06 | (Brazil) Hélio Castroneves | Meyer Shank Racing | Honda | N/A | 01:42.0399 | N/A | N/A | 26 |
| 27 | 20 | (United States) Ryan Hunter-Reay | Ed Carpenter Racing | Chevrolet | N/A | 01:44.1738 | N/A | N/A | 27 |

Notes

- **Bold text** indicates fastest time set in session.

== Warmup ==
Top practice speeds
| Pos | No. | Driver | Team | Engine | Lap time |
|---|---|---|---|---|---|
| 1 | 7 | (United States) Alexander Rossi W | Arrow McLaren | Chevrolet | 01:41.7917 |
| 2 | 9 | (New Zealand) Scott Dixon W | Chip Ganassi Racing | Honda | 01:41.8080 |
| 3 | 12 | (Australia) Will Power W | Team Penske | Chevrolet | 01:42.0323 |

== Race ==
The race started at 1:30 PM ET on June 18, 2023.

=== Race classification ===
| Pos | No. | Driver | Team | Engine | Laps | Time/retired | Pit stops | Grid | Laps led | Pts. |
|---|---|---|---|---|---|---|---|---|---|---|
| 1 | 10 | (Spain) Álex Palou W | Chip Ganassi Racing | Honda | 55 | 1:50:04.6640 | 3 | 3 | 10 | 51 |
| 2 | 2 | (United States) Josef Newgarden W | Team Penske | Chevrolet | 55 | +4.5610 | 3 | 4 | | 40 |
| 3 | 5 | (Mexico) Pato O'Ward | Arrow McLaren | Chevrolet | 55 | +6.7549 | 3 | 2 | | 35 |
| 4 | 9 | (New Zealand) Scott Dixon W | Chip Ganassi Racing | Honda | 55 | +6.9718 | 4 | 23 | | 32 |
| 5 | 26 | (United States) Colton Herta | Andretti Autosport with Curb-Agajanian | Honda | 55 | +10.9328 | 3 | 1 | 33 | 34 |
| 6 | 8 | (Sweden) Marcus Ericsson | Chip Ganassi Racing | Honda | 55 | +11.5208 | 3 | 9 | | 28 |
| 7 | 45 | (Denmark) Christian Lundgaard | Rahal Letterman Lanigan Racing | Honda | 55 | +15.8835 | 3 | 7 | | 26 |
| 8 | 3 | (New Zealand) Scott McLaughlin | Team Penske | Chevrolet | 55 | +16.2822 | 3 | 18 | | 24 |
| 9 | 27 | (United States) Kyle Kirkwood | Andretti Autosport | Honda | 55 | +17.5480 | 4 | 6 | | 22 |
| 10 | 7 | (United States) Alexander Rossi W | Arrow McLaren | Chevrolet | 55 | +19.6371 | 3 | 5 | | 20 |
| 11 | 15 | (United States) Graham Rahal | Rahal Letterman Lanigan Racing | Honda | 55 | +21.4730 | 3 | 14 | | 19 |
| 12 | 21 | (Netherlands) Rinus VeeKay | Ed Carpenter Racing | Chevrolet | 55 | +22.1054 | 4 | 15 | | 18 |
| 13 | 12 | (Australia) Will Power W | Team Penske | Chevrolet | 55 | +25.6694 | 7 | 22 | 7 | 18 |
| 14 | 60 | (France) Simon Pagenaud | Meyer Shank Racing | Honda | 55 | +31.4292 | 3 | 20 | | 16 |
| 15 | 06 | (Brazil) Hélio Castroneves | Meyer Shank Racing | Honda | 55 | +33.6232 | 4 | 26 | | 15 |
| 16 | 14 | (United States) Santino Ferrucci | A. J. Foyt Enterprises | Chevrolet | 55 | +34.3000 | 3 | 11 | | 14 |
| 17 | 20 | (United States) Ryan Hunter-Reay | Ed Carpenter Racing | Chevrolet | 55 | +42.4660 | 4 | 27 | | 13 |
| 18 | 77 | (United Kingdom) Callum Ilott | Juncos Hollinger Racing | Chevrolet | 55 | +42.9535 | 3 | 17 | | 12 |
| 19 | 78 | (Argentina) Agustín Canapino R | Juncos Hollinger Racing | Chevrolet | 55 | +44.8009 | 4 | 21 | | 11 |
| 20 | 6 | (Sweden) Felix Rosenqvist W | Arrow McLaren | Chevrolet | 55 | +49.0897 | 4 | 16 | | 10 |
| 21 | 55 | (Denmark) Benjamin Pedersen R | A. J. Foyt Enterprises | Chevrolet | 55 | +51.9763 | 4 | 10 | | 9 |
| 22 | 51 | (United States) Sting Ray Robb R | Dale Coyne Racing with Rick Ware Racing | Honda | 55 | +1:09.6654 | 4 | 25 | | 8 |
| 23 | 29 | (Canada) Devlin DeFrancesco | Andretti Steinbrenner Autosport | Honda | 55 | +1:23.6408 | 4 | 12 | | 7 |
| 24 | 11 | (New Zealand) Marcus Armstrong R | Chip Ganassi Racing | Honda | 54 | +1 Lap | 4 | 8 | 5 | 7 |
| 25 | 28 | (France) Romain Grosjean | Andretti Autosport | Honda | 54 | +1 Lap | 5 | 19 | | 5 |
| 26 | 30 | (United Kingdom) Jack Harvey | Rahal Letterman Lanigan Racing | Honda | 54 | +1 Lap | 7 | 24 | | 5 |
| 27 | 18 | (United States) David Malukas | Dale Coyne Racing with HMD Motorsports | Honda | 24 | Off Course | 2 | 13 | | 5 |
Fastest lap: (Australia) Will Power (Team Penske) – 01:42.8921 (lap 45)

== Championship standings after the race ==
Drivers' Championship standings

| | Pos. | Driver | Points |
|---|---|---|---|
| Unchanged | 1 | (Spain) Álex Palou | 324 |
| Unchanged | 2 | (Sweden) Marcus Ericsson | 250 |
| Unchanged | 3 | (United States) Josef Newgarden | 243 |
| 1 | 4 | (Mexico) Pato O'Ward | 226 |
| 1 | 5 | (New Zealand) Scott Dixon | 226 |

Engine manufacturer standings

| | Pos. | Manufacturer | Points |
|---|---|---|---|
| Unchanged | 1 | Honda | 663 |
| Unchanged | 2 | Chevrolet | 628 |

- Note: Only the top five positions are included.

| Previous race: 2023 Chevrolet Detroit Grand Prix | IndyCar Series; 2023 season | Next race: 2023 Honda Indy 200 at Mid-Ohio |
| Previous race: 2022 Sonsio Grand Prix at Road America | Grand Prix of Road America | Next race: 2024 Sonsio Grand Prix at Road America |
