= Detroit Street Circuit =

Street courses used by motor races in downtown Detroit

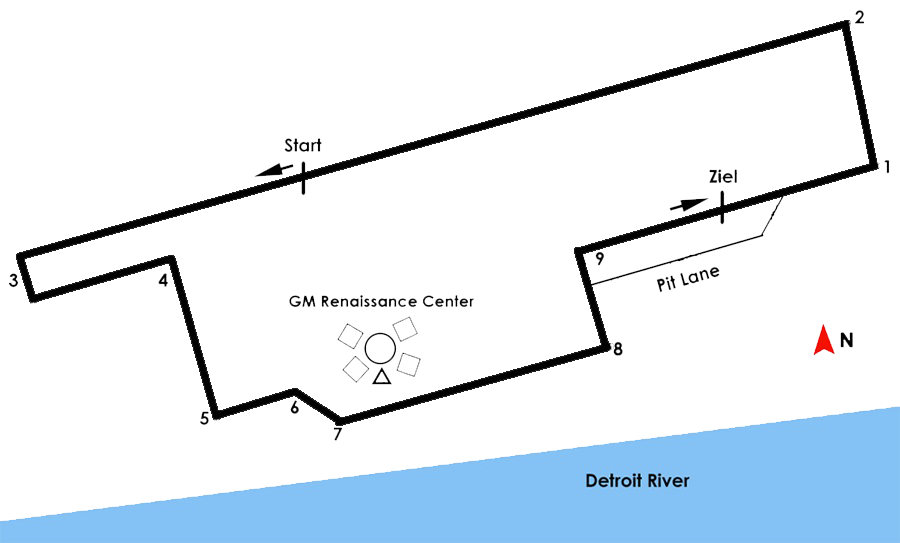
- Grand Prix Circuit (2023–present)
- Location: Detroit, Michigan, USA
- Coordinates: 42°19′47.1″N 83°2′24.4″W
- FIA Grade: 2 (Note: Detorit Street Circuit's Grade 2 license expired on 2 June 2026.)
- Opened: June 4, 1982; 44 years ago Re-opened: June 2, 2023; 3 years ago
- Closed: June 16, 1991; 35 years ago
- Major events: Current: IndyCar; Detroit Grand Prix (2023–present); IMSA SportsCar Championship; Detroit Sports Car Classic (2024–present); Indy NXT; Indy NXT by Firestone Detroit Grand Prix (1989–1991, 2023–present); Former: Michelin Pilot Challenge; Detroit Grand Prix (2023); Trans-Am; Motor City 100 (1984–1991, 2023); Formula One; Detroit Grand Prix (1982–1988); CART Detroit Grand Prix (1989–1991); Formula Atlantic (1983)
- Website: https://www.detroitgp.com/

Grand Prix Circuit (2023–present)
- Length: 1.645 mi (2.647 km)
- Turns: 10
- Race lap record: 1:01.9410 ( (United States) Kyle Kirkwood, Dallara IR-18, 2023, IndyCar)

Grand Prix Circuit (1983–1991)
- Length: 2.500 mi (4.023 km)
- Turns: 22
- Race lap record: 1:40.464 ( (Brazil) Ayrton Senna, Lotus 99T, 1987, F1)

Grand Prix Circuit (1982)
- Length: 2.590 mi (4.168 km)
- Turns: 24
- Race lap record: 1:50.438 ( (France) Alain Prost, Renault RE30B, 1982, F1)

The streets of Detroit, in the U.S. state of Michigan, hosted Formula One racing, and later Championship Auto Racing Teams (CART) racing, between the 1982 and 1991 seasons. The street circuit course was set up near the Renaissance Center and the Cobo Arena, also including a small part of the M-1 highway, also known as Woodward Avenue. It is a flat circuit, with elevation ranging from 577–604 ft (176–184 m) above sea level.

The circuit was reopened on June 2, 2023, for the IndyCar Detroit Grand Prix race weekend with a modified and shortened layout.

== History ==
=== Formula One ===
Created largely in an effort to improve the city's international image, the race meant that the United States would host three Grands Prix in the 1982 season (the other two US races, Long Beach and Las Vegas, had been added to the schedule for similar purposes), the only nation in F1 history to do so until the 2020 season, when Italy also hosted three Grands Prix: Monza, Mugello, and Imola. The inaugural Detroit Grand Prix saw McLaren's John Watson claim victory after starting in 17th place, then the lowest grid position for an eventual race winner on a street circuit. (Watson would break his own record at Long Beach the next year by winning from 22nd place.)

1982 in Detroit would also see the last time to date (as of 2025) that a reigning World Drivers' Champion would fail to qualify for a Formula One World Championship Grand Prix. On that occasion it was Nelson Piquet in the Brabham-BMW turbo who, after numerous problems during initial qualifying, was in 28th position (only 26 cars would start), never got the chance to improve in final qualifying due to the final hour being held in wet conditions where lap times were at least 12 seconds slower.

The Detroit street circuit's place in Formula One history was assured when Michele Alboreto won the 1983 race driving a Tyrrell 011. This was the last of 155 Grand Prix wins for the 3.0L Cosworth DFV V8 engine, dating back to its debut at the 1967 Dutch Grand Prix in the hands of dual World Champion Jim Clark. It was also the last of 23 Formula One race wins for Tyrrell, who had won their first Grand Prix at the 1971 Spanish Grand Prix with that year's World Champion Jackie Stewart driving the Tyrrell 003.

The race soon gained a reputation for being horrendously demanding and gruelling, with the very bumpy track often breaking up badly under the consistently hot weather. It was perhaps the single hardest race on both car and driver in Formula One during the 1980s, often producing races of attrition in which a large number of cars would retire due to mechanical breakdown or contact with the narrow concrete walls. Brakes and gearboxes in particular were tested to their breaking points—the drivers had to brake hard more than 20 times per lap and change gears around 50 to 60 times in one lap (cars still had manual gearboxes in those days), for 62 laps usually lasting around 1 minute and 45 seconds. At least half the field retired in each race; it was thus considered an achievement if a driver could even finish the race, let alone win it.

The 1984 race, won by reigning World Champion Piquet, tied an F1 road course record by featuring 20 retirements. Shortly after the race, impurities were found in the water injection system of Martin Brundle's Tyrrell, causing him to be stripped of his 2nd-place finish and Tyrrell (by then the only team still using the naturally-aspirated DFV) to be disqualified from the entire 1984 season. The race's five classified finishers (discounting Brundle) is beaten only by the 1966 Monaco Grand Prix.

By 1985, Detroit was the sole American venue on the F1 calendar—Las Vegas had been dropped after 1982, Long Beach switched to CART for 1984, and a new event in Dallas only lasted one year after the heat and deteriorating track conditions almost saw it cancelled on the morning of the race. That year saw Ayrton Senna take pole position, and he went on to enjoy substantial success at the circuit, winning the 1986, 1987, and 1988 races, as well as taking further pole positions in 1986 and 1988.

The track was only moderately received by the drivers, and was especially disliked by world champions Alain Prost and Piquet. Despite his open dislike of the track, Prost did finish second in 1988, and third in 1986 and 1987 (all for McLaren). Piquet, who generally disliked street circuits (with the exception of the faster and more open Adelaide circuit in Australia), won at Detroit in 1984 and came second to Senna in 1987. Embarrassingly, Piquet hit the wall during practice for the 1988 race when he spun his Lotus-Honda into the wall coming out of turn 1. At the time, the Lotus had been carrying an onboard camera for some recorded laps.

The 1988 race, similar to the failed Dallas event, was extremely hot, and the circuit broke up very badly due to the intense heat and humidity. After the race, the drivers were far more vocal in their criticism of the track, with race winner Senna comparing driving on the crumbled surface to driving in heavy rain. 1988 subsequently proved to be the last F1 race in Detroit, as the sport's governing body FISA ruled that its temporary pit area wasn't up to the required standard for a World Championship race. The United States Grand Prix moved to another street circuit in Phoenix, Arizona, while the Detroit event became a CART race.

=== CART ===
Three CART races were held on the track which was altered slightly with the removal of the unpopular chicane immediately prior to the pits. Emerson Fittipaldi won the first and last races and Michael Andretti won the second race; Andretti also won pole position for each Detroit race. The final race featured an unusual lack of attrition as nearly 3/4 of the drivers finished.

The race was not economically viable for the city, so the venue was changed to a temporary course on Belle Isle for the 1992 season. That event lasted until 2001 as a CART event and was briefly revived for the 2007 and 2008 American Le Mans Series and IndyCar Series seasons, and then again from 2012 through 2019. There was no race in 2020 due to the COVID-19 pandemic. The race returned for both 2021 and 2022 with the race moving to a new location for 2023 (see next section for more details).

=== IndyCar ===
It was announced on November 3, 2021, that the IndyCar Series Detroit Grand Prix would move from the Raceway at Belle Isle Park back to the downtown circuit beginning in 2023. The new circuit is significantly smaller and features fewer corners than the original Detroit street circuit, with only two of the original circuit's corners being repurposed for the new circuit. Penske Entertainment president Bud Denker said that while bringing back the original circuit layout was considered, it was ultimately not used due to the higher costs of resurfacing the larger circuit, the impact closing the side streets would have on local businesses operating on the circuit, and having a negative effect on traffic in the area. This new circuit focuses mostly on Atwater Street and East Jefferson Avenue and only features ten corners compared to the twenty-two corners the original circuit had.

== Layout history ==
Grand Prix Circuit (1982)

Grand Prix Circuit (1983–1991)

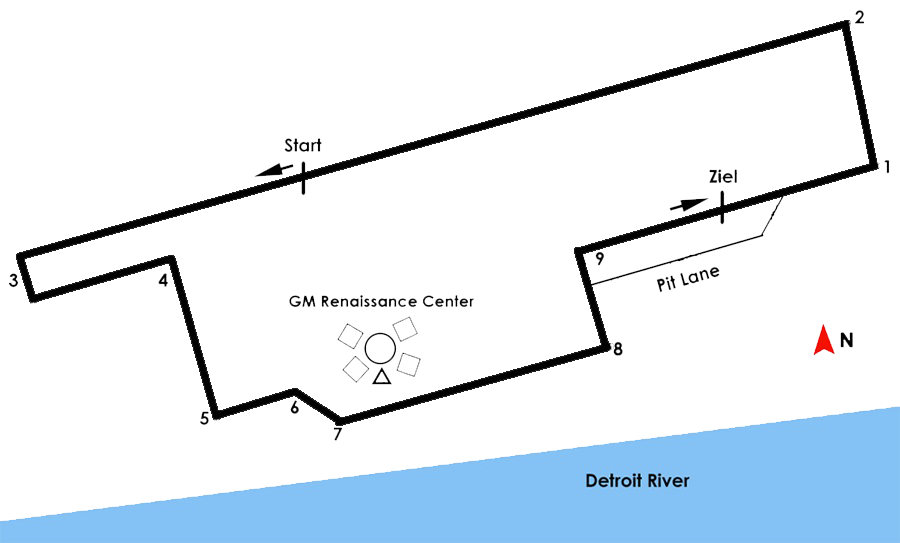
Grand Prix Circuit (2023–present)

== Lap records ==
As of May 2026, the official fastest race lap records at the Detroit Street Circuit are listed as:

Category	Time	Driver	Vehicle	Event
Grand Prix Circuit (2023–present): 1.645 mi (2.647 km)
IndyCar	1:01.9410	Kyle Kirkwood	Dallara IR-18	2023 Chevrolet Detroit Grand Prix presented by Lear
Indy NXT	1:05.5533	Lochie Hughes	Dallara IL-15	2025 Indy NXT by Firestone Detroit Grand Prix
LMDh	1:05.874	Nick Tandy	Porsche 963	2024 Chevrolet Detroit Sports Car Classic
LMH	1:06.996	Roman De Angelis	Aston Martin Valkyrie AMR-LMH	2026 Detroit Sports Car Classic
GT3	1:09.848	Alexander Sims	Chevrolet Corvette Z06 GT3.R	2026 Detroit Sports Car Classic
Trans-Am	1:13.323	Connor Zilisch	Chevrolet Camaro Trans-Am	2023 Detroit Trans-Am round
GT4	1:15.352	Scott Andrews	Mercedes-AMG GT4	2023 Chevrolet Detroit Sports Car Classic
Grand Prix Circuit (1983–1991): 2.499 mi (4.022 km)
Formula One	1:40.464	Ayrton Senna	Lotus 99T	1987 Detroit Grand Prix
CART	1:46.004	Michael Andretti	Lola T90/00	1990 Valvoline Detroit Grand Prix
Indy Lights	1:52.744	Ted Prappas	Wildcat-Buick	1989 Detroit Indy Lights round
Formula Atlantic	1:55.558	Michael Andretti	Ralt RT4	1983 Kroger Centennial 100
Trans-Am	2:01.538	Pete Halsmer	Merkur XR4Ti	1988 Detroit Trans-Am round
Original Grand Prix Circuit (1982): 2.590 mi (4.168 km)
Formula One	1:50.438	Alain Prost	Renault RE30B	1982 Detroit Grand Prix
