= 2022 Honda Indy Grand Prix of Alabama =

Indycar race held in Birmingham, Alabama

(United States) 2022 Honda Indy Grand Prix of Alabama
Race details
4th round of the 2022 IndyCar season
← Previous race	Next race →
- Date: May 1, 2022
- Official name: Honda Indy Grand Prix of Alabama
- Location: Barber Motorsports Park, Birmingham, Alabama
- Course: Permanent road course 2.380 mi / 3.830 km
- Distance: 90 laps 214.200 mi / 344.700 km

Pole position
- Driver: (Netherlands) Rinus VeeKay (Ed Carpenter Racing)
- Time: 01:06.2507

Fastest lap
- Driver: (Spain) Álex Palou (Chip Ganassi Racing)
- Time: 01:08.1541 (on lap 62 of 90)

Podium
- First: (Mexico) Pato O'Ward (Arrow McLaren SP)
- Second: (Spain) Álex Palou (Chip Ganassi Racing)
- Third: (Netherlands) Rinus VeeKay (Ed Carpenter Racing)

The 2022 Honda Indy Grand Prix of Alabama was the fourth round of the 2022 IndyCar season. The race was held on May 1, 2022, in Birmingham, Alabama at the Barber Motorsports Park. The race lasted for 90 laps.

== Entry list ==
Key	Meaning
R	Rookie
W	Past winner

No.	Driver	Team	Engine
2	(United States) Josef Newgarden W	Team Penske	Chevrolet
3	(New Zealand) Scott McLaughlin	Team Penske	Chevrolet
4	(Canada) Dalton Kellett	A. J. Foyt Enterprises	Chevrolet
5	(Mexico) Patricio O'Ward	Arrow McLaren SP	Chevrolet
06	(Brazil) Hélio Castroneves W	Meyer Shank Racing	Honda
7	(Sweden) Felix Rosenqvist	Arrow McLaren SP	Chevrolet
8	(Sweden) Marcus Ericsson	Chip Ganassi Racing	Honda
9	(New Zealand) Scott Dixon	Chip Ganassi Racing	Honda
10	(Spain) Álex Palou W	Chip Ganassi Racing	Honda
11	(Colombia) Tatiana Calderón R	A. J. Foyt Enterprises	Chevrolet
12	(Australia) Will Power W	Team Penske	Chevrolet
14	(United States) Kyle Kirkwood R	A. J. Foyt Enterprises	Chevrolet
15	(United States) Graham Rahal	Rahal Letterman Lanigan Racing	Honda
18	(United States) David Malukas R	Dale Coyne Racing with HMD Motorsports	Honda
20	(United States) Conor Daly	Ed Carpenter Racing	Chevrolet
21	(Netherlands) Rinus VeeKay	Ed Carpenter Racing	Chevrolet
26	(United States) Colton Herta	Andretti Autosport	Honda
27	(United States) Alexander Rossi	Andretti Autosport	Honda
28	(France) Romain Grosjean	Andretti Autosport	Honda
29	(Canada) Devlin DeFrancesco R	Andretti Steinbrenner Autosport	Honda
30	(Denmark) Christian Lundgaard R	Rahal Letterman Lanigan Racing	Honda
45	(United Kingdom) Jack Harvey	Rahal Letterman Lanigan Racing	Honda
48	(United States) Jimmie Johnson	Chip Ganassi Racing	Honda
51	(Japan) Takuma Sato W	Dale Coyne Racing with Rick Ware Racing	Honda
60	(France) Simon Pagenaud W	Meyer Shank Racing	Honda
77	(United Kingdom) Callum Ilott R	Juncos Hollinger Racing	Chevrolet

== Practice ==
=== Practice 1 ===
Practice 1 took place at 4:00PM ET on April 29, 2022.

Top Practice Speeds
Pos	No.	Driver	Team	Engine	Lap Time
1	26	(United States) Colton Herta	Andretti Autosport	Honda	01:06.5149
2	10	(Spain) Álex Palou W	Chip Ganassi Racing	Honda	01:06.5657
3	27	(United States) Alexander Rossi	Andretti Autosport	Honda	01:06.6657

=== Practice 2 ===
Top Practice Speeds
Pos	No.	Driver	Team	Engine	Lap Time
1	21	(Netherlands) Rinus VeeKay	Ed Carpenter Racing	Chevrolet	01:05.9264
2	5	(Mexico) Pato O'Ward	Arrow McLaren SP	Chevrolet	01:06.0136
3	26	(United States) Colton Herta	Andretti Autosport with Curb-Agajanian	Honda	01:06.0434

== Qualifying ==
=== Qualifying classification ===
Pos	No.	Driver	Team	Engine	Time				Final grid
Pos	No.	Driver	Team	Engine	Round 1		Round 2	Round 3	Final grid
Pos	No.	Driver	Team	Engine	Group 1	Group 2	Round 2	Round 3	Final grid
1	21	(Netherlands) Rinus VeeKay	Ed Carpenter Racing	Chevrolet	N/A	01:06.5477	01:06.2732	**01:06.2507**	1
2	5	(Mexico) Pato O'Ward	Arrow McLaren SP	Chevrolet	01:06.2448	N/A	**01:06.1054**	01:06.4003	2
3	10	(Spain) Álex Palou **W**	Chip Ganassi Racing	Honda	01:06.3877	N/A	01:06.3153	01:06.4415	3
4	3	(New Zealand) Scott McLaughlin	Team Penske	Chevrolet	**01:06.0289**	N/A	01:06.1474	01:06.4967	4
5	27	(United States) Alexander Rossi	Andretti Autosport	Honda	01:06.3962	N/A	01:06.1839	01:06.5549	5
6	7	(Sweden) Felix Rosenqvist	Arrow McLaren SP	Chevrolet	01:06.3855	N/A	01:06.2721	01:06.6410	6
7	2	(United States) Josef Newgarden **W**	Team Penske	Chevrolet	N/A	01:06.3799	01:06.3348	N/A	7
8	28	(France) Romain Grosjean	Andretti Autosport	Honda	N/A	**01:06.2000**	01:06.3820	N/A	8
9	15	(United States) Graham Rahal	Rahal Letterman Lanigan Racing	Honda	01:06.5016	N/A	01:06.6339	N/A	9
10	26	(United States) Colton Herta	Andretti Autosport with Curb-Agajanian	Honda	N/A	01:06.3396	01:06.7295	N/A	10
11	77	(United Kingdom) Callum Ilott **R**	Juncos Hollinger Racing	Chevrolet	N/A	01:06.6649	01:07.2000	N/A	11
12	8	(Sweden) Marcus Ericsson	Chip Ganassi Racing	Honda	N/A	01:06.7305	01:07.3561	N/A	12
13	9	(New Zealand) Scott Dixon	Chip Ganassi Racing	Honda	01:06.5142	N/A	N/A	N/A	13
14	30	(Denmark) Christian Lundgaard **R**	Rahal Letterman Lanigan Racing	Honda	N/A	01:06.7462	N/A	N/A	14
15	45	(United Kingdom) Jack Harvey	Rahal Letterman Lanigan Racing	Honda	01:06.6511	N/A	N/A	N/A	15
16	06	(Brazil) Hélio Castroneves **W**	Meyer Shank Racing	Honda	N/A	01:06.8138	N/A	N/A	16
17	51	(Japan) Takuma Sato **W**	Dale Coyne Racing with Rick Ware Racing	Honda	01:06.7541	N/A	N/A	N/A	17
18	18	(United States) David Malukas **R**	Dale Coyne Racing with HMD Motorsports	Honda	N/A	01:06.8898	N/A	N/A	18
19	12	(Australia) Will Power **W**	Team Penske	Chevrolet	01:06.7775	N/A	N/A	N/A	19
20	29	(Canada) Devlin DeFrancesco **R**	Andretti Steinbrenner Autosport	Honda	N/A	01:07.0242	N/A	N/A	20
21	14	(United States) Kyle Kirkwood **R**	A. J. Foyt Enterprises	Chevrolet	01:06.8213	N/A	N/A	N/A	21
22	20	(United States) Conor Daly	Ed Carpenter Racing	Chevrolet	N/A	01:07.0350	N/A	N/A	22
23	4	(Canada) Dalton Kellett	A. J. Foyt Enterprises	Chevrolet	01:07.6869	N/A	N/A	N/A	23
24	60	(France) Simon Pagenaud **W**	Meyer Shank Racing	Honda	N/A	01:07.1052	N/A	N/A	24
25	11	(Colombia) Tatiana Calderón **R**	A. J. Foyt Enterprises	Chevrolet	01:07.9248	N/A	N/A	N/A	25
26	48	(United States) Jimmie Johnson	Chip Ganassi Racing	Honda	N/A	01:09.0075	N/A	N/A	26

Notes

- **Bold text** indicates fastest time set in session.

== Warmup ==
Top Warmup Speeds
Pos	No.	Driver	Team	Engine	Lap Time
1	77	(United Kingdom) Callum Ilott R	Juncos Hollinger Racing	Chevrolet	01:07.0906
2	10	(Spain) Álex Palou W	Chip Ganassi Racing	Honda	01:07.1916
3	8	(Sweden) Marcus Ericsson	Chip Ganassi Racing	Honda	01:07.2745

== Race ==
The race started at 1:05PM ET on May 1, 2022.

=== Race classification ===
Pos	No.	Driver	Team	Engine	Laps	Time/Retired	Pit Stops	Grid	Laps Led	Pts.
1	5	(Mexico) Pato O'Ward	Arrow McLaren SP	Chevrolet	90	01:48:39.4368	2	2	27	51
2	10	(Spain) Álex Palou W	Chip Ganassi Racing	Honda	90	+0.9800	2	3	4	41
3	21	(Netherlands) Rinus VeeKay	Ed Carpenter Racing	Chevrolet	90	+12.4819	2	1	57	39
4	12	(Australia) Will Power W	Team Penske	Chevrolet	90	+15.2616	2	19		32
5	9	(New Zealand) Scott Dixon	Chip Ganassi Racing	Honda	90	+22.8297	2	13		30
6	3	(New Zealand) Scott McLaughlin	Team Penske	Chevrolet	90	+24.0649	2	4		28
7	28	(France) Romain Grosjean	Andretti Autosport	Honda	90	+24.5161	3	8		26
8	15	(United States) Graham Rahal	Rahal Letterman Lanigan Racing	Honda	90	+31.9173	2	9		24
9	27	(United States) Alexander Rossi	Andretti Autosport	Honda	90	+33.2497	2	5		22
10	26	(United States) Colton Herta	Andretti Autosport with Curb-Agajanian	Honda	90	+33.5102	3	10		20
11	60	(France) Simon Pagenaud W	Meyer Shank Racing	Honda	90	+33.7418	2	24		19
12	8	(Sweden) Marcus Ericsson	Chip Ganassi Racing	Honda	90	+34.4738	3	12		18
13	51	(Japan) Takuma Sato W	Dale Coyne Racing with Rick Ware Racing	Honda	90	+34.9140	2	17		17
14	2	(United States) Josef Newgarden W	Team Penske	Chevrolet	90	+35.6807	3	7	2	17
15	30	(Denmark) Christian Lundgaard R	Rahal Letterman Lanigan Racing	Honda	90	+37.0416	2	14		15
16	7	(Sweden) Felix Rosenqvist	Arrow McLaren SP	Chevrolet	90	+41.6145	2	6		14
17	29	(Canada) Devlin DeFrancesco R	Andretti Steinbrenner Autosport	Honda	90	+42.4511	2	20		13
18	45	(United Kingdom) Jack Harvey	Rahal Letterman Lanigan Racing	Honda	90	+1:02.3267	3	15		12
19	20	(United States) Conor Daly	Ed Carpenter Racing	Chevrolet	90	+1:03.2947	3	22		11
20	18	(United States) David Malukas R	Dale Coyne Racing with HMD Motorsports	Honda	90	+1:03.7435	2	18		10
21	06	(Brazil) Hélio Castroneves W	Meyer Shank Racing	Honda	90	+1:04.5322	3	16		9
22	14	(United States) Kyle Kirkwood R	A. J. Foyt Enterprises	Chevrolet	89	+1 Lap	4	21		8
23	4	(Canada) Dalton Kellett	A. J. Foyt Enterprises	Chevrolet	89	+1 Lap	3	23		7
24	48	(United States) Jimmie Johnson	Chip Ganassi Racing	Honda	89	+1 Lap	3	26		6
25	77	(United Kingdom) Callum Ilott R	Juncos Hollinger Racing	Chevrolet	88	+2 Laps	3	11		5
26	11	(Colombia) Tatiana Calderón R	A. J. Foyt Enterprises	Chevrolet	88	+2 Laps	3	25		5
Fastest lap: (Spain) Álex Palou (Chip Ganassi Racing) – 01:08.1541 (lap 62)

== Championship standings after the race ==
Drivers' Championship standings

	Pos.	Driver	Points
2	1	(Spain) Álex Palou	144
Unchanged	2	(New Zealand) Scott McLaughlin	141
2	3	(United States) Josef Newgarden	135
Unchanged	4	(Australia) Will Power	134
4	5	(Mexico) Pato O'Ward	114

Engine manufacturer standings

	Pos.	Manufacturer	Points
Unchanged	1	Chevrolet	365
Unchanged	2	Honda	283

- Note: Only the top five positions are included.
