= Devlin DeFrancesco =

Canadian racing driver

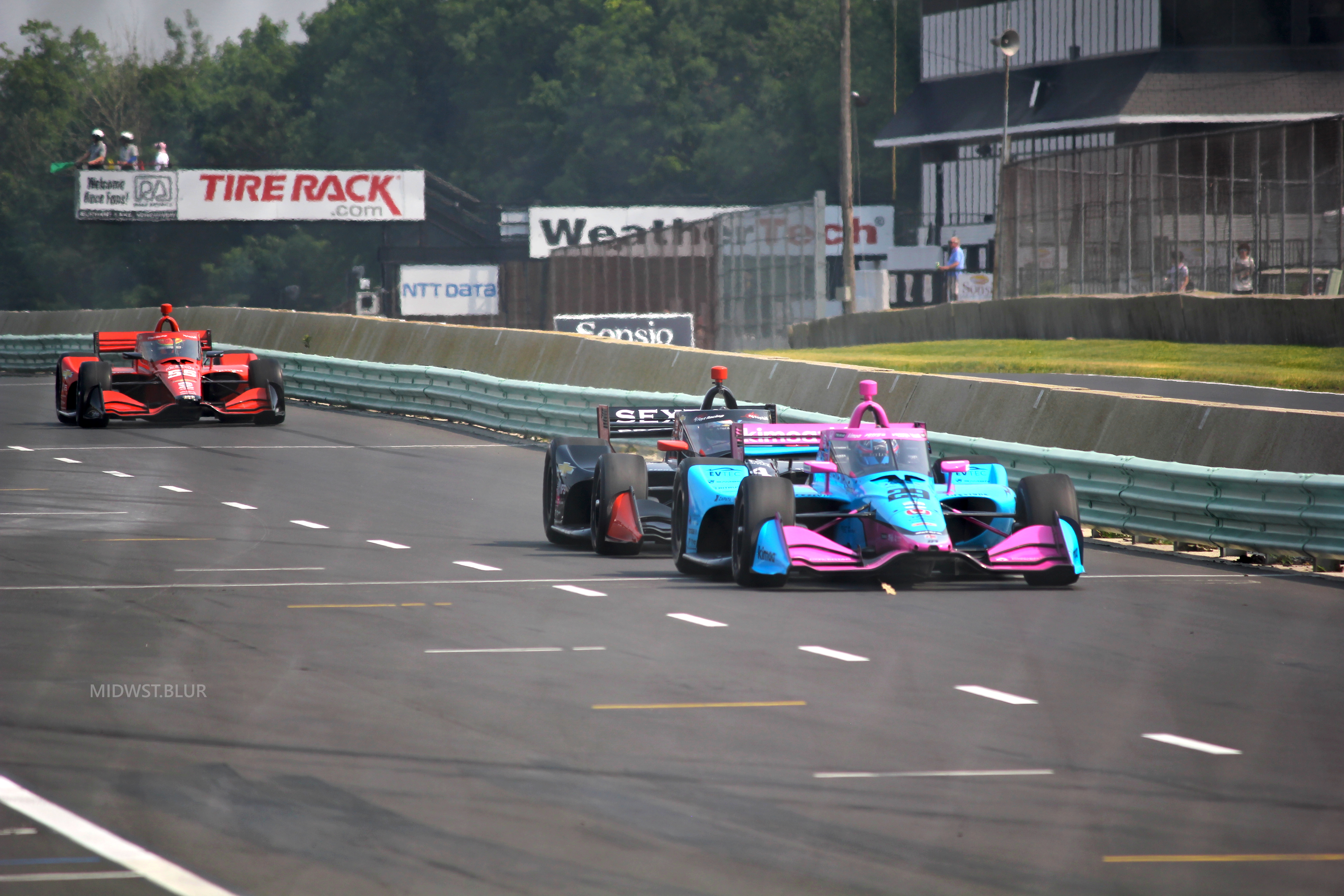
- DeFrancesco (front car) in 2023
- Nationality: (Canada) Canadian
- Born: 17 January 2000 (age 26) Toronto, Ontario, Canada
- Categorisation: FIA Silver

IndyCar Series career
- 51 races run over 3 years
- 2022 position: 23rd
- Best finish: 22nd (2023)
- First race: 2022 Firestone Grand Prix of St. Petersburg (St. Petersburg)
- Last race: 2025 Borchetta Bourbon Music City Grand Prix (Nashville)
Wins	Podiums	Poles
0	0	0

Previous series
- 2021 2020 2020 2019 2018 2018 2017 2016 2016 2016 2015: Indy Lights; Indy Pro 2000 Championship; Asian F3 Championship; FIA Formula 3 Championship; F3 European Championship; GP3 Series; Euroformula Open Championship; MSA Formula; Italian F4 Championship; Toyota Racing Series; Ginetta Junior Championship

Championship titles
- 2017: Spanish F3 Championship

Devlin DeFrancesco (born January 17, 2000) is a Canadian auto racing driver who last competed in the IndyCar Series for Rahal Letterman Lanigan Racing. In January 2022, DeFrancesco won the sixtieth running of the Daytona 24, alongside his teammates Eric Lux, Patricio O'Ward and Colton Herta, in the LMP2 class.

== Early life ==
DeFrancesco was born fifteen weeks premature on January 17, 2000, to Andrew and Cathy DeFrancesco. Weighing only a pound at birth, he was cared for at Toronto's Sunnybrook Health Sciences Centre until he was nursed back to health.

== Racing career ==
=== Karting ===
In 2014, DeFrancesco placed second overall in the Italian Championship and third overall in the CIK FIA European Championship. In 2014, he sustained an injury to his wrist that required two surgeries and that kept him out of a full racing series for roughly year. As part of his rehabilitation, Devlin attended the Carlin Academy, where he used a combination of simulators and on-track testing to prepare for FIA Formula 4-style racing.

In 2015, DeFrancesco was selected to be a part of the Generation Ganassi Driver Identification Program, a mentoring and talent development program sponsored by Chip Ganassi Racing aiming to identify and assist up to ten North American drivers between the ages of thirteen and eighteen.

=== Ginetta Junior Championship ===
Graduating from karts in 2015, DeFrancesco competed in the 2015 Ginetta Junior Championship with HHC Motorsports. He finished 23rd in the standings with 66 points.

=== Toyota Racing Series ===
In early 2016, DeFrancesco competed in New Zealand's Toyota Racing Series with Giles Motorsport. He finished the season tenth overall with a total of 465 points.

=== MSA Formula ===
DeFrancesco joined Carlin Motorsports for the 2016 MSA Formula season, taking three wins and finishing fifth in the points standings.

=== Euroformula Open ===
DeFrancesco continued his collaboration with Carlin Motorsport in the Euroformula Open and Spanish Formula 3 Championships in 2017. A strong campaign saw him end the season as Spanish Formula 3 champion with three wins and five podiums. He also won a victory and seven podiums in the Euroformula Open championship, netting third in the championship standings.

=== FIA Formula 3 European Championship ===
DeFrancesco joined the FIA Formula 3 European Championship for the final two rounds of the 2017 season. He once again teamed up with Carlin in 2018, competing in the opening two races. He was forced to withdraw from the following round to undergo dental surgery, and subsequently made the switch to join GP3 Series for the remainder of the 2018 season, teaming up with MP Motorsport.

=== GP3 Series ===
Joining MP Motorsport, DeFrancesco finished the year in 21st place without scoring points.

=== FIA Formula 3 ===
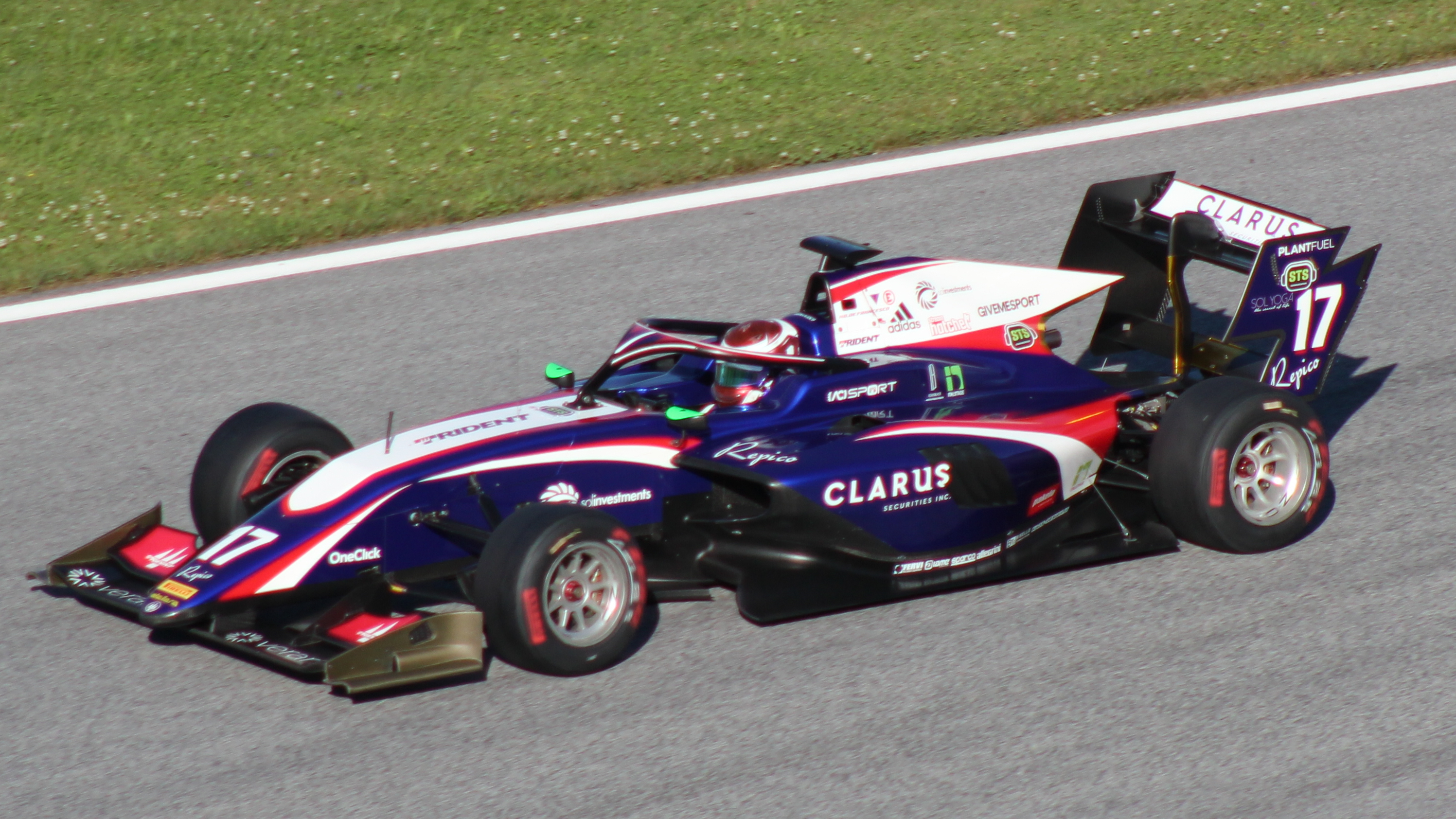
DeFrancesco driving the Dallara F3 2019 during the 2019 Spielberg Formula 3 round

In 2019, DeFrancesco contested the inaugural FIA F3 championship, with Trident Racing. He did not score throughout the year and finished 25th.

In February 2020, it was announced that DeFrancesco would rejoin Trident Racing for a second year in the championship, but he was forced to withdraw from the season amongst fears of COVID-19, DeFrancesco being immunocompromised.

=== Asian Formula 3 ===
DeFrancesco took part in a partial 2019/20 F3 Asian Championship certified by FIA campaign with Absolute Racing, finishing seventh in the championship with three podiums.

=== WeatherTech SportsCar Championship ===
DeFrancesco raced in the WeatherTech SportsCar Championship, joining the grid for the 2018 24 Hours of Daytona. He finished sixth on debut, and returned for the ‘Petit Le Mans’ event at Road Atlanta in October, finishing in ninth place.

2019 saw DeFrancesco return to the Daytona 24 with JDC MotorSports. Alongside teammates Misha Goikhberg, Tristan Vautier and Rubens Barrichello, the race ended early ahead of the 22nd hour of racing due to heavy rainfall, which placed the car in fifth place at the flag.

=== Road to Indy ===
In 2020, DeFrancesco joined Steinbrenner Racing and Andretti Autosport to compete the 2020 Indy Pro 2000 Championship. He scored two wins and was runner-up to Sting Ray Robb.

DeFrancesco moved to Indy Lights in 2021 in a car co-entered by Steinbrenner Racing and Andretti Autosport. With two podiums and nine top-fives, he finished sixth in the points standings.

=== IndyCar ===
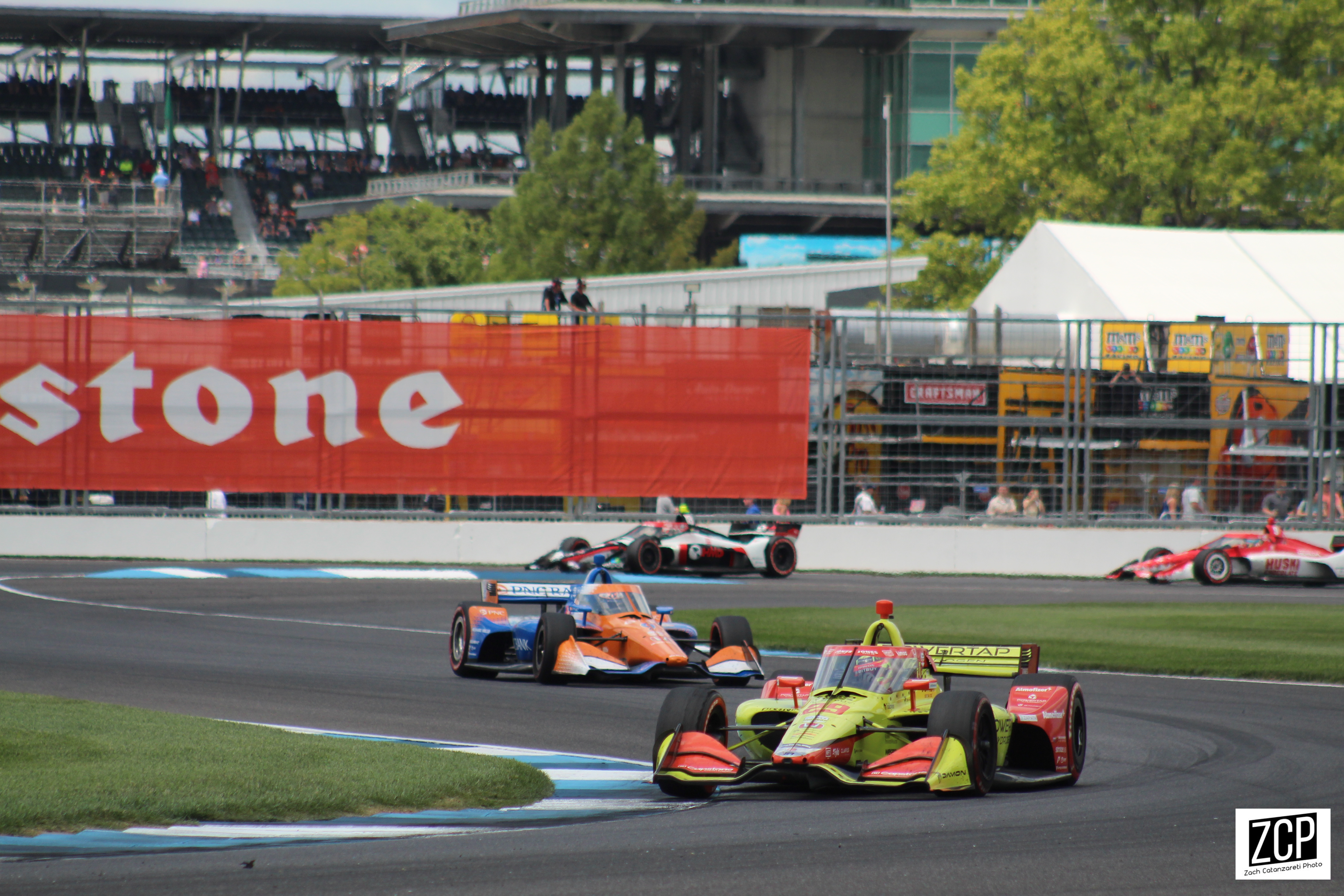
DeFrancesco (front) competing at Indianapolis Motor Speedway in 2022.

DeFrancesco joined the IndyCar Series for the 2022 season, driving the No. 29 car entered as Andretti Steinbrenner Autosport. He had a best result of twelfth at Gateway and ranked 23rd in the driver's standings. DeFrancesco continued with the same team for the 2023 season and finished 22nd. DeFrancesco failed to secure a ride for the 2024 season and did not participate in any IndyCar races that season.

DeFrancesco would return to the series in 2025 after signing a multi-year deal to drive for Rahal Letterman Lanigan Racing. Following Mick Schumacher's signing in November 2025, DeFrancesco was out of an IndyCar ride for 2026.

== Racing record ==
=== Career summary ===
Season	Series	Team	Races	Wins	Poles	F/Laps	Podiums	Points	Position
2015	Ginetta Junior Championship	HHC Motorsport	12	0	1	0	0	66	23rd
2016	F4 British Championship	Carlin	30	3	1	2	10	265	5th
2016	Italian F4 Championship	Mücke Motorsport	18	0	0	0	0	40	19th
2016	Toyota Racing Series	Giles Motorsport	15	0	0	0	0	465	10th
2017	Euroformula Open Championship	Carlin	16	1	0	0	7	172	**3rd**
2017	Spanish Formula 3 Championship	Carlin	6	1	0	0	3	119	**1st**
2017	FIA Formula 3 European Championship	Carlin	6	0	0	0	0	0	NC†
2017	Macau Grand Prix	Carlin	1	0	0	0	0	N/A	DNF
2018	GP3 Series	MP Motorsport	12	0	0	0	0	0	21st
2018	FIA Formula 3 European Championship	Carlin	6	0	0	0	0	0	25th
2018	IMSA SportsCar Championship - Prototype	JDC-Miller MotorSports	2	0	0	0	0	47	38th
2019	FIA Formula 3 Championship	Trident	16	0	0	0	0	0	25th
2019	IMSA SportsCar Championship - DPi	JDC-Miller MotorSports	1	0	0	0	0	26	32nd
2019–20	F3 Asian Championship	Absolute Racing	9	0	1	1	3	101	7th
2020	Indy Pro 2000 Championship	Andretti Steinbrenner Autosport	17	2	3	1	6	341	**2nd**
2021	Indy Lights	Andretti Steinbrenner Autosport	20	0	0	0	2	326	6th
2021	IMSA SportsCar Championship - LMP2	DragonSpeed USA	2	0	0	0	1	0	NC‡
2022	IndyCar Series	Andretti Steinbrenner Autosport	17	0	0	0	0	206	23rd
2022	IMSA SportsCar Championship - LMP2	DragonSpeed USA	2	1	0	0	1	0	NC‡
2023	IndyCar Series	Andretti Steinbrenner Autosport	17	0	0	0	0	177	22nd
2023	IMSA SportsCar Championship - LMP2	Rick Ware Racing	3	0	0	0	0	484	22nd
2024	IMSA SportsCar Championship - GTD	Forte Racing	5	0	0	1	1	1305	26th
2025	IndyCar Series	Rahal Letterman Lanigan Racing	17	0	0	0	0	171	26th
2026	IMSA SportsCar Championship - GTD	RS1	1	0	0	0	0	234	69th

^{†} As DeFrancesco was a guest driver, he was ineligible for points.
^{‡} Points only counted towards the Michelin Endurance Cup, and not the overall LMP2 Championship. ^{*} Season still in progress.

=== Complete Ginetta Junior Championship results ===
(key) (Races in bold indicate pole position; races in italics indicate fastest lap)

Year	Team	1	2	3	4	5	6	7	8	9	10	11	12	13	14	15	16	17	18	19	20	DC	Points
2015	HHC Motorsport	BHI; 1	BHI; 2	DON; 1	DON; 2	THR; 1	THR; 2	OUL; 1	OUL; 2	CRO; 1 Ret	CRO; 2; 23	SNE; 1; 20	SNE; 2; 13	KNO; 1; 7	KNO; 2; 11	**ROC**; **1**; 14	ROC; 2; 11	SIL; 1; 11	SIL; 2 Ret	BHGP; 1 Ret	BHGP; 2; 18	23rd	66

=== Complete Toyota Racing Series results ===
(key) (Races in bold indicate pole position) (Races in italics indicate fastest lap)

Year	Team	1	2	3	4	5	6	7	8	9	10	11	12	13	14	15	DC	Points
2016	Giles Motorsport	RUA; 1; 14	RUA; 2; 10	RUA; 3; 6	TER; 1 Ret	TER; 2; 14	TER; 3; 5	HMP; 1; 11	HMP; 2; 13	HMP; 3; 12	TAU; 1; 8	TAU; 2; 11	TAU; 3; 10	MAU; 1; 7	MAU; 2; 9	MAU; 3; 13	10th	465

=== Complete F4 British Championship results ===
(key) (Races in bold indicate pole position; races in italics indicate fastest lap)

Year	Team	1	2	3	4	5	6	7	8	9	10	11	12	13	14	15	16	17	18	19	20	21	22	23	24	25	26	27	28	29	30	DC	Points
2016	Carlin	BHI; 1; 10	BHI; 2 Ret	BHI; 3; 7	DON; 1; 5	DON; 2 Ret	DON; 3; 17	THR; 1; 2	THR; 2 Ret	THR; 3; 1	**OUL**; **1**; 1	OUL; 2; 7	OUL; 3; 2	CRO; 1; 4	CRO; 2 Ret	CRO; 3; 1	SNE; 1; 2	SNE; 2; 3	SNE; 3; 2	KNO; 1; 2	KNO; 2 Ret	KNO; 3; 9	ROC; 1 Ret	ROC; 2; 9	ROC; 3; 7	SIL; 1; 3	SIL; 2; 5	SIL; 3; 4	BHGP; 1 Ret	BHGP; 2; 16	BHGP; 3; 7	5th	265

=== Complete Italian F4 Championship results ===
(key) (Races in bold indicate pole position; races in italics indicate fastest lap)

Year	Team	1	2	3	4	5	6	7	8	9	10	11	12	13	14	15	16	17	18	19	20	21	22	23	DC	Points
2016	Mücke Motorsport	MIS; 1; 23	MIS; 2; 9	MIS; 3	MIS; 4; 10	ADR; 1	ADR; 2	ADR; 3	ADR; 4	IMO1; 1 Ret	IMO1; 2; 7	IMO1; 3 Ret	MUG; 1; 8	MUG; 2; 5	MUG; 3; 5	VAL; 1; 9	VAL; 2 Ret	VAL; 3 DNS	IMO2; 1 Ret	IMO2; 2; 11	IMO2; 3; 8	MNZ; 1 Ret	MNZ; 2; 12	MNZ; 3; 6	19th	40

=== Complete Euroformula Open Championship results ===
(key) (Races in bold indicate pole position; races in italics indicate points for the fastest lap of top ten finishers)

Year	Entrant	1	2	3	4	5	6	7	8	9	10	11	12	13	14	15	16	DC	Points
2017	Carlin Motorsport	EST; 1; 12	EST; 2; 5	SPA; 1; 3	SPA; 2; 2	LEC; 1 Ret	LEC; 2; 5	HUN; 1; 8	HUN; 2 Ret	SIL; 1; 2	SIL; 2; 2	MNZ; 1; 7	MNZ; 2 Ret	JER; 1; 2	JER; 2; 3	CAT; 1; 1	CAT; 2; 5	3rd	172

=== Complete FIA Formula 3 European Championship results ===
(key) (Races in bold indicate pole position) (Races in italics indicate fastest lap)

Year	Entrant	Engine	1	2	3	4	5	6	7	8	9	10	11	12	13	14	15	16	17	18	19	20	21	22	23	24	25	26	27	28	29	30	DC	Points
2017	Carlin	Volkswagen	SIL; 1	SIL; 2	SIL; 3	MNZ; 1	MNZ; 2	MNZ; 3	PAU; 1	PAU; 2	PAU; 3	HUN; 1	HUN; 2	HUN; 3	NOR; 1	NOR; 2	NOR; 3	SPA; 1	SPA; 2	SPA; 3	ZAN; 1	ZAN; 2	ZAN; 3	NÜR; 1	NÜR; 2	NÜR; 3	RBR; 1; 16	RBR; 2; 20	RBR; 3; 12	HOC; 1; 19	HOC; 2; 17	HOC; 3; 14	NC†	0†
2018	Carlin	Volkswagen	PAU; 1 Ret	PAU; 2 Ret	PAU; 3 Ret	HUN; 1; 18	HUN; 2; 16	HUN; 3; 14	NOR; 1 WD	NOR; 2 WD	NOR; 3 WD	ZAN; 1 WD	ZAN; 2 WD	ZAN; 3 WD	SPA; 1	SPA; 2	SPA; 3	SIL; 1	SIL; 2	SIL; 3	MIS; 1	MIS; 2	MIS; 3	NÜR; 1	NÜR; 2	NÜR; 3	RBR; 1	RBR; 2	RBR; 3	HOC; 1	HOC; 2	HOC; 3	25th	0

^{†} As DeFrancesco was a guest driver, he was ineligible for points.

=== Complete Macau Grand Prix results ===
Year	Team	Car	Qualifying	Quali Race	Main race
2017	(United Kingdom) Carlin	Dallara F317	14th	21st	DNF

=== Complete GP3 Series/FIA Formula 3 Championship results ===
(key) (Races in bold indicate pole position) (Races in italics indicate fastest lap)

Year	Team	1	2	3	4	5	6	7	8	9	10	11	12	13	14	15	16	17	18	Pos	Points
2018	MP Motorsport	CAT; FEA	CAT; SPR	LEC; FEA	LEC; SPR	RBR; FEA; 18†	RBR; SPR; 11	SIL; FEA; 15	SIL; SPR; 14	HUN; FEA; WD	HUN; SPR; WD	SPA; FEA; 18	SPA; SPR; Ret	MNZ; FEA; 13	MNZ; SPR; 15	SOC; FEA; 17	SOC; SPR; 12	YMC; FEA; 17	YMC; SPR; 11	21st	0
2019	Trident	CAT; FEA; 23	CAT; SPR; 20	LEC; FEA; 21†	LEC; SPR; 21	RBR; FEA; 17	RBR; SPR; 9	SIL; FEA; 27	SIL; SPR; 17	HUN; FEA; 12	HUN; SPR; 11	SPA; FEA; 29	SPA; SPR; Ret	MNZ; FEA; 12	MNZ; SPR; 16	SOC; FEA; 23	SOC; SPR; 12			25th	0

^{†} Driver did not finish the race, but was classified as he completed over 90% of the race distance.

=== Complete IMSA SportsCar Championship Results ===
(key) (Races in bold indicate pole position; races in italics indicate fastest lap)

Year	Team	Class	Make	Engine	1	2	3	4	5	6	7	8	9	10	Rank	Points
2018	JDC-Miller MotorSports	P	Oreca 07	Gibson GK428 4.2 L V8	DAY; 6	SEB	LBH	MOH	DET	WGL	MOS	ELK	LGA	PET; 9	38th	47
2019	JDC-Miller MotorSports	DPi	Cadillac DPi-V.R	Cadillac 5.5L V8	DAY; 5	SEB	LBH	MOH	DET	WGL	MOS	ELK	LGA	PET	32nd	26
2021	DragonSpeed USA	LMP2	Oreca 07	Gibson GK428 4.2 L V8	DAY; 3†	SEB	WGL	WGL	ELK	LGA	PET				NC†	0†
2022	DragonSpeed USA	LMP2	Oreca 07	Gibson GK428 V8	DAY; 1†	SEB	LGA	MOH	WGL	ELK	PET				NC†	0†
2023	Rick Ware Racing	LMP2	Oreca 07	Gibson GK428 4.2 L V8	DAY; 6†	SEB; 7	LGA	WGL; 9	ELK	IMS	PET				22nd	484
2024	Forte Racing	GTD	Lamborghini Huracán GT3 Evo 2	Lamborghini DGF 5.2 L V10	DAY; 16	SEB; 5	LBH	LGA	WGL; 14	MOS	ELK	VIR	IMS; 4	PET; 2	26th	1305
2026	RS1	GTD	Porsche 911 GT3 R (992)	Porsche M97/80 4.2 L Flat-6	DAY	SEB	LBH	LGA	WGL	MOS	ELK; 10	VIR	IMS	PET	69th	234

^{†} Points only counted towards the Michelin Endurance Cup, and not the overall LMP2 Championship.

=== Complete F3 Asian Championship results ===
(key) (Races in bold indicate pole position) (Races in italics indicate fastest lap)

Year	Team	1	2	3	4	5	6	7	8	9	10	11	12	13	14	15	Pos	Points
2019-20	Absolute Racing	SEP1; 1; 3	SEP1; 2; 9	SEP1; 3; 2	DUB; 1; 5	DUB; 2; 6	DUB; 3; 5	ABU; 1; 6	ABU; 2; 3	ABU; 3; 7	SEP2; 1	SEP2; 2	SEP2; 3	CHA; 1	CHA; 2	CHA; 3	7th	101

=== American open-wheel racing results ===
(key)

==== Indy Pro 2000 Championship ====
Year	Team	1	2	3	4	5	6	7	8	9	10	11	12	13	14	15	16	17	Rank	Points
2020	Andretti Steinbrenner Autosport	**ROA**; 2	ROA; 4	MOH; 7	MOH; 2	MOH; 3	LOR; 4	**GMP**; 1	IMS; 4	IMS; 2	IMS; 8	MOH; 14	MOH; 11	**NJM**; 1	NJM; 10	NJM; 10	STP; 7	STP; 6	2nd	341

==== Indy Lights ====
Year	Team	1	2	3	4	5	6	7	8	9	10	11	12	13	14	15	16	17	18	19	20	Rank	Points
2021	Andretti Steinbrenner Autosport	ALA; 3	ALA; 3	STP; 12	STP; 5	IMS; 7	IMS; 6	DET; 7	DET; 5	RDA; 10	RDA; 6	MOH; 5	MOH; 5	GTW; 4	GTW; 5	POR; 11	POR; 7	LAG; 6	LAG; 8	MOH; 8	MOH; 4	6th	326

==== IndyCar Series ====
(key) (Races in bold indicate pole position; races in italics indicate fastest lap)

Year	Team	No.	Chassis	Engine	1	2	3	4	5	6	7	8	9	10	11	12	13	14	15	16	17	Rank	Points	Ref
2022	Andretti Steinbrenner Autosport	29	Dallara DW12	Honda	STP; 22	TXS; 24	LBH; 25	ALA; 17	IMS; 21	INDY; 20	DET; 18	ROA; 18	MOH; 17	TOR; 18	IOW; 17	IOW; 15	IMS; 18	NSH; 22	GTW; 12	POR; 16	LAG; 15	23rd	206	
2023	Andretti Steinbrenner Autosport	29	Dallara DW12	Honda	STP; 25	TXS; 23	LBH; 16	ALA; 23	IMS; 17	INDY; 13	DET; 12	ROA; 23	MOH; 14	TOR; 23	IOW; 22	IOW; 21	NSH; 26	IMS; 19	GTW; 19	POR; 17	LAG; 22	22nd	177	
2025	Rahal Letterman Lanigan Racing	30	Dallara DW12	Honda	STP; 22	THE; 20	LBH; 24	ALA; 24	IMS; 17	INDY; 11	DET; 23	GTW; 23	ROA; 19	MOH; 20	IOW; 19	IOW; 25	TOR; 22	LAG; 20	POR; 18	MIL; 16	NSH; 18	26th	171	

==== Indianapolis 500 ====
Year	Chassis	Engine	Start	Finish	Team
2022	Dallara	Honda	24	20	Andretti Steinbrenner Autosport
2023	Dallara	Honda	25	13	Andretti Steinbrenner Autosport
2025	Dallara	Honda	16	11	Rahal Letterman Lanigan Racing

Sporting positions
Preceded by Leonardo Pulcini	Spanish Formula 3 Championship; Champion; 2017	Succeeded by Felipe Drugovich
