= 2022 GMR Grand Prix =

Indycar race held in Speedway, Indiana

(United States) 2022 GMR Grand Prix
Race details
5th round of the 2022 IndyCar season
← Previous race	Next race →
- Date: May 14, 2022
- Official name: GMR Grand Prix
- Location: Indianapolis Motor Speedway, Speedway, Indiana
- Course: Permanent road course 2.439 mi / 3.925 km
- Distance: 75 laps 182.925 mi / 294.389 km

Pole position
- Driver: (Australia) Will Power (Team Penske)
- Time: 01:09.7664

Fastest lap
- Driver: (United States) Colton Herta (Andretti Autosport with Curb Agajanian)
- Time: 01:11.7415 (on lap 31 of 75)

Podium
- First: (United States) Colton Herta (Andretti Autosport with Curb Agajanian)
- Second: (France) Simon Pagenaud (Meyer Shank Racing)
- Third: (Australia) Will Power (Team Penske)

Chronology
Previous	Next
August 2021	July 2022

The 2022 GMR Grand Prix was the fifth round of the 2022 IndyCar season. The race was held on May 14, 2022, in Speedway, Indiana at the Indianapolis Motor Speedway. The race was originally scheduled for 85 laps, but under INDYCAR rules, the race was declared a wet race at the start, meaning the race was limited to two hours.

== Entry list ==
Key	Meaning
R	Rookie
W	Past winner

No.	Driver	Team	Engine
2	(United States) Josef Newgarden	Team Penske	Chevrolet
3	(New Zealand) Scott McLaughlin	Team Penske	Chevrolet
4	(Canada) Dalton Kellett	A. J. Foyt Enterprises	Chevrolet
5	(Mexico) Patricio O'Ward	Arrow McLaren SP	Chevrolet
06	(Brazil) Hélio Castroneves	Meyer Shank Racing	Honda
6	(Colombia) Juan Pablo Montoya	Arrow McLaren SP	Chevrolet
7	(Sweden) Felix Rosenqvist	Arrow McLaren SP	Chevrolet
8	(Sweden) Marcus Ericsson	Chip Ganassi Racing	Honda
9	(New Zealand) Scott Dixon	Chip Ganassi Racing	Honda
10	(Spain) Álex Palou	Chip Ganassi Racing	Honda
11	(Colombia) Tatiana Calderón R	A. J. Foyt Enterprises	Chevrolet
12	(Australia) Will Power W	Team Penske	Chevrolet
14	(United States) Kyle Kirkwood R	A. J. Foyt Enterprises	Chevrolet
15	(United States) Graham Rahal	Rahal Letterman Lanigan Racing	Honda
18	(United States) David Malukas R	Dale Coyne Racing with HMD Motorsports	Honda
20	(United States) Conor Daly	Ed Carpenter Racing	Chevrolet
21	(Netherlands) Rinus VeeKay W	Ed Carpenter Racing	Chevrolet
26	(United States) Colton Herta	Andretti Autosport with Curb Agajanian	Honda
27	(United States) Alexander Rossi	Andretti Autosport	Honda
28	(France) Romain Grosjean	Andretti Autosport	Honda
29	(Canada) Devlin DeFrancesco R	Andretti Steinbrenner Autosport	Honda
30	(Denmark) Christian Lundgaard R	Rahal Letterman Lanigan Racing	Honda
45	(United Kingdom) Jack Harvey	Rahal Letterman Lanigan Racing	Honda
48	(United States) Jimmie Johnson	Chip Ganassi Racing	Honda
51	(Japan) Takuma Sato	Dale Coyne Racing with Rick Ware Racing	Honda
60	(France) Simon Pagenaud W	Meyer Shank Racing	Honda
77	(United Kingdom) Callum Ilott R	Juncos Hollinger Racing	Chevrolet

== Practice ==
=== Practice 1 ===
Top Practice Speeds
Pos	No.	Driver	Team	Engine	Lap Time
1	10	(Spain) Álex Palou	Chip Ganassi Racing	Honda	01:10.4555
2	77	(United Kingdom) Callum Ilott R	Juncos Hollinger Racing	Chevrolet	01:10.4593
3	12	(Australia) Will Power W	Team Penske	Chevrolet	01:10.5277

=== Practice 2 ===
Top Practice Speeds
Pos	No.	Driver	Team	Engine	Lap Time
1	5	(Mexico) Pato O'Ward	Arrow McLaren SP	Chevrolet	01:09.7839
2	10	(Spain) Álex Palou	Chip Ganassi Racing	Honda	01:09.8137
3	26	(United States) Colton Herta	Andretti Autosport w/ Curb Agajanian	Honda	01:09.8423

== Qualifying ==
=== Qualifying classification ===
Pos	No.	Driver	Team	Engine	Time				Final grid
Pos	No.	Driver	Team	Engine	Round 1		Round 2	Round 3	Final grid
Pos	No.	Driver	Team	Engine	Group 1	Group 2	Round 2	Round 3	Final grid
1	12	(Australia) Will Power **W**	Team Penske	Chevrolet	**01:09.5544**	N/A	01:09.4905	**01:09.7664**	1
2	10	(Spain) Álex Palou	Chip Ganassi Racing	Honda	01:09.5683	N/A	**01:09.4114**	01:09.8090	2
3	2	(United States) Josef Newgarden	Team Penske	Chevrolet	01:09.7151	N/A	01:09.5837	01:09.8343	3
4	20	(United States) Conor Daly	Ed Carpenter Racing	Chevrolet	N/A	01:09.7210	01:09.6387	01:09.9063	4
5	5	(Mexico) Pato O'Ward	Arrow McLaren SP	Chevrolet	N/A	**01:09.4708**	01:09.4574	01:10.0546	5
6	7	(Sweden) Felix Rosenqvist	Arrow McLaren SP	Chevrolet	01:09.6831	N/A	01:09.4379	01:10.0605	6
7	77	(United Kingdom) Callum Ilott **R**	Juncos Hollinger Racing	Chevrolet	N/A	01:09.7025	01:09.6530	N/A	7
8	30	(Denmark) Christian Lundgaard **R**	Rahal Letterman Lanigan Racing	Honda	N/A	01:09.6777	01:09.6594	N/A	8
9	45	(United Kingdom) Jack Harvey	Rahal Letterman Lanigan Racing	Honda	01:09.7910	N/A	01:09.6899	N/A	9
10	28	(France) Romain Grosjean	Andretti Autosport	Honda	01:09.8214	N/A	01:09.7100	N/A	10
11	3	(New Zealand) Scott McLaughlin	Team Penske	Chevrolet	N/A	01:09.5511	01:09.7847	N/A	11
12	15	(United States) Graham Rahal	Rahal Letterman Lanigan Racing	Honda	N/A	01:09.7458	01:10.2950	N/A	12
13	51	(Japan) Takuma Sato	Dale Coyne Racing w/ Rick Ware Racing	Honda	01:09.8239	N/A	N/A	N/A	13
14	26	(United States) Colton Herta	Andretti Autosport w/ Curb Agajanian	Honda	N/A	01:09.8527	N/A	N/A	14
15	21	(Netherlands) Rinus VeeKay **W**	Ed Carpenter Racing	Chevrolet	01:09.9550	N/A	N/A	N/A	15
16	27	(United States) Alexander Rossi	Andretti Autosport	Honda	N/A	01:09.9178	N/A	N/A	16
17	29	(Canada) Devlin DeFrancesco **R**	Andretti Steinbrenner Autosport	Honda	01:10.1306	N/A	N/A	N/A	17
18	8	(Sweden) Marcus Ericsson	Chip Ganassi Racing	Honda	N/A	01:09.9294	N/A	N/A	18
19	06	(Brazil) Hélio Castroneves	Meyer Shank Racing	Honda	01:10.1417	N/A	N/A	N/A	19
20	60	(France) Simon Pagenaud **W**	Meyer Shank Racing	Honda	N/A	01:09.9717	N/A	N/A	20
21	9	(New Zealand) Scott Dixon	Chip Ganassi Racing	Honda	01:10.1694	N/A	N/A	N/A	21
22	14	(United States) Kyle Kirkwood **R**	A. J. Foyt Enterprises	Chevrolet	N/A	01:10.1954	N/A	N/A	22
23	6	(Colombia) Juan Pablo Montoya	Arrow McLaren SP	Chevrolet	01:10.7610	N/A	N/A	N/A	23
24	18	(United States) David Malukas **R**	Dale Coyne Racing w/ HMD Motorsports	Honda	N/A	01:10.4755	N/A	N/A	24
25	11	(Colombia) Tatiana Calderón **R**	A. J. Foyt Enterprises	Chevrolet	01:11.0020	N/A	N/A	N/A	25
26	4	(Canada) Dalton Kellett	A. J. Foyt Enterprises	Chevrolet	N/A	01:10.7187	N/A	N/A	26
27	48	(United States) Jimmie Johnson	Chip Ganassi Racing	Honda	01:11.4599	N/A	N/A	N/A	27

Notes

- **Bold text** indicates fastest time set in session.

== Warmup ==
Top Warmup Speeds
Pos	No.	Driver	Team	Engine	Lap Time
1	8	(Sweden) Marcus Ericsson	Chip Ganassi Racing	Honda	01:11.0839
2	77	(United Kingdom) Callum Ilott R	Juncos Hollinger Racing	Chevrolet	01:11.1970
3	7	(Sweden) Felix Rosenqvist	Arrow McLaren SP	Chevrolet	01:11.2391

== Race ==
Originally set for a 3:46 PM ET start, the race was then rescheduled for 3:07 PM ET on May 14, 2022. After a lightning delay caused the Indy Lights race to be suspended and resumed after the NTT IndyCar Series feature, the race started at 3:46 PM ET as planned. As it was declared a wet race, series officials removed the initial 85 lap distance and replaced it with a two-hour time limit.

=== Race classification ===
Pos	No.	Driver	Team	Engine	Laps^{1}	Time/Retired^{2}	Pit Stops	Grid	Laps Led	Pts.
1	26	(United States) Colton Herta	Andretti Autosport w/ Curb Agajanian	Honda	75	02:01:56.3273	4	14	50	53
2	60	(France) Simon Pagenaud W	Meyer Shank Racing	Honda	75	+3.0983	4	20		40
3	12	(Australia) Will Power W	Team Penske	Chevrolet	75	+7.1538	4	1		36
4	8	(Sweden) Marcus Ericsson	Chip Ganassi Racing	Honda	75	+7.8193	6	18	10	33
5	20	(United States) Conor Daly	Ed Carpenter Racing	Chevrolet	75	+9.6535	4	4		30
6	7	(Sweden) Felix Rosenqvist	Arrow McLaren SP	Chevrolet	75	+11.0949	6	6	4	29
7	51	(Japan) Takuma Sato	Dale Coyne Racing w/ Rick Ware Racing	Honda	75	+11.5104	5	13		26
8	77	(United Kingdom) Callum Ilott R	Juncos Hollinger Racing	Chevrolet	75	+11.5105	4	7		24
9	30	(Denmark) Christian Lundgaard R	Rahal Letterman Lanigan Racing	Honda	75	+11.8047	6	8		22
10	9	(New Zealand) Scott Dixon	Chip Ganassi Racing	Honda	75	+13.9916	3	21		20
11	27	(United States) Alexander Rossi	Andretti Autosport	Honda	75	+16.7300	5	16		19
12	18	(United States) David Malukas R	Dale Coyne Racing w/ HMD Motorsports	Honda	75	+17.9817	5	24		18
13	45	(United Kingdom) Jack Harvey	Rahal Letterman Lanigan Racing	Honda	75	+19.5748	4	9		17
14	06	(Brazil) Hélio Castroneves	Meyer Shank Racing	Honda	75	+24.4881	4	19		16
15	11	(Colombia) Tatiana Calderón R	A. J. Foyt Enterprises	Chevrolet	75	+31.9259	5	25	1	16
16	15	(United States) Graham Rahal	Rahal Letterman Lanigan Racing	Honda	75	+41.8037	5	12		14
17	28	(France) Romain Grosjean	Andretti Autosport	Honda	74	+1 Lap	5	10		13
18	10	(Spain) Álex Palou	Chip Ganassi Racing	Honda	74	+1 Lap	7	2		12
19	5	(Mexico) Pato O'Ward	Arrow McLaren SP	Chevrolet	74	+1 Lap	4	5	5	12
20	3	(New Zealand) Scott McLaughlin	Team Penske	Chevrolet	74	+1 Lap	4	11	5	11
21	29	(Canada) Devlin DeFrancesco R	Andretti Steinbrenner Autosport	Honda	73	+2 Laps	5	17		9
22	48	(United States) Jimmie Johnson	Chip Ganassi Racing	Honda	73	+2 Laps	6	27		8
23	21	(Netherlands) Rinus VeeKay W	Ed Carpenter Racing	Chevrolet	73	+2 Laps	6	15		7
24	6	(Colombia) Juan Pablo Montoya	Arrow McLaren SP	Chevrolet	72	Contact	4	23		6
25	2	(United States) Josef Newgarden	Team Penske	Chevrolet	60	+15 Laps	6	3		5
26	14	(United States) Kyle Kirkwood R	A. J. Foyt Enterprises	Chevrolet	53	Contact	5	22		5
27	4	(Canada) Dalton Kellett	A. J. Foyt Enterprises	Chevrolet	34	Contact	2	26		5
Fastest lap: (United States) Colton Herta (Andretti Autosport w/ Curb Agajanian) – 01:11.7415 (lap 31)

^{1} Race shortened to two-hour timed race.

^{2} Race ended under caution period.

== Championship standings after the race ==
Drivers' Championship standings

	Pos.	Driver	Points
3	1	(Australia) Will Power	170
1	2	(Spain) Álex Palou	156
1	3	(New Zealand) Scott McLaughlin	152
1	4	(United States) Josef Newgarden	140
1	5	(New Zealand) Scott Dixon	133

Engine manufacturer standings

	Pos.	Manufacturer	Points
Unchanged	1	Chevrolet	431
Unchanged	2	Honda	378

- Note: Only the top five positions are included.
