= 2022 Firestone Grand Prix of St. Petersburg =

First round of the 2022 IndyCar Series

(United States) 2022 Firestone Grand Prix of St. Petersburg
Race details
1st round of the 2022 IndyCar season
Next race →
- Layout of the Streets of St. Petersburg
- Date: February 27, 2022
- Official name: Firestone Grand Prix of St. Petersburg
- Location: Streets of St. Petersburg
- Course: Temporary street circuit 1.800 mi / 2.897 km
- Distance: 100 laps 180.000 mi / 289.682 km

Pole position
- Driver: (New Zealand) Scott McLaughlin (Team Penske)
- Time: 00:59.4821

Fastest lap
- Driver: (United States) Conor Daly (Ed Carpenter Racing)
- Time: 01:00.9868 (on lap 53 of 100)

Podium
- First: (New Zealand) Scott McLaughlin (Team Penske)
- Second: (Spain) Álex Palou (Chip Ganassi Racing)
- Third: (Australia) Will Power (Team Penske)

Chronology
Previous	Next
2021	2023

The 2022 Firestone Grand Prix of St. Petersburg was an IndyCar motor race held on February 27, 2022 at the Streets of St. Petersburg in St. Petersburg, Florida. It was the season opener of the 2022 IndyCar Series. The race lasted for 100 laps.

Scott McLaughlin of Team Penske scored his first pole in qualifying and claimed his first race victory in the series over Álex Palou, after leading the most laps in the race. Will Power, McLaughlin's teammate, finished third to complete the podium.

== Background ==
In September 2021, it was announced that St. Petersburg, Florida would host the first race of the 2022 season on February 27, 2022. This marked the first February start for the IndyCar series since the 2004 season and the earliest the season has started since 2003 (at the same circuit).

Colton Herta was the defending race winner, having won the previous Firestone Grand Prix of St. Petersburg in 2021.

=== Entrants ===
26 drivers entered the race, with six of them classified as rookies for the 2022 season. Four rookies made their IndyCar race debut, two of them for A. J. Foyt Enterprises: Kyle Kirkwood made his debut with the team after winning the 2021 Indy Lights championship, alongside former Super Formula and WEC driver Tatiana Calderón, who secured her seat after impressing the team after a test with the team in 2021. 2021 Indy Lights runner-up David Malukas debuted for Dale Coyne Racing, while Canadian driver Devlin DeFrancesco, who had finished sixth in the 2021 Indy Lights championship, debuted for Andretti Steinbrenner Autosport.

Key	Meaning
R	Rookie
W	Past winner

	Driver	Team	Engine
2	(United States) Josef Newgarden W	Team Penske	Chevrolet
3	(New Zealand) Scott McLaughlin	Team Penske	Chevrolet
4	(Canada) Dalton Kellett	A. J. Foyt Enterprises	Chevrolet
5	(Mexico) Patricio O'Ward	Arrow McLaren SP	Chevrolet
06	(Brazil) Hélio Castroneves W	Meyer Shank Racing	Honda
7	(Sweden) Felix Rosenqvist	Arrow McLaren SP	Chevrolet
8	(Sweden) Marcus Ericsson	Chip Ganassi Racing	Honda
9	(New Zealand) Scott Dixon	Chip Ganassi Racing	Honda
10	(Spain) Álex Palou	Chip Ganassi Racing	Honda
11	(Colombia) Tatiana Calderón R	A. J. Foyt Enterprises	Chevrolet
12	(Australia) Will Power W	Team Penske	Chevrolet
14	(United States) Kyle Kirkwood R	A. J. Foyt Enterprises	Chevrolet
15	(United States) Graham Rahal W	Rahal Letterman Lanigan Racing	Honda
18	(United States) David Malukas R	Dale Coyne Racing with HMD Motorsports	Honda
20	(United States) Conor Daly	Ed Carpenter Racing	Chevrolet
21	(Netherlands) Rinus VeeKay	Ed Carpenter Racing	Chevrolet
26	(United States) Colton Herta W	Andretti Autosport with Curb-Agajanian	Honda
27	(United States) Alexander Rossi	Andretti Autosport	Honda
28	(France) Romain Grosjean	Andretti Autosport	Honda
29	(Canada) Devlin DeFrancesco R	Andretti Steinbrenner Autosport	Honda
30	(Denmark) Christian Lundgaard R	Rahal Letterman Lanigan Racing	Honda
45	(United Kingdom) Jack Harvey	Rahal Letterman Lanigan Racing	Honda
48	(United States) Jimmie Johnson	Chip Ganassi Racing	Honda
51	(Japan) Takuma Sato	Dale Coyne Racing with Rick Ware Racing	Honda
60	(France) Simon Pagenaud	Meyer Shank Racing	Honda
77	(United Kingdom) Callum Ilott R	Juncos Hollinger Racing	Chevrolet

== Practice ==
=== Practice 1 ===
Top Practice Speeds
Pos	No.	Driver	Team	Engine	Lap Time
1	28	(France) Romain Grosjean	Andretti Autosport	Honda	1:01:0525
2	26	(United States) Colton Herta W	Andretti Autosport with Curb-Agajanian	Honda	1:01:1567
3	12	(Australia) Will Power W	Team Penske	Chevrolet	1:01:2282

=== Practice 2 ===
Top Practice Speeds
Pos	No.	Driver	Team	Engine	Lap Time
1	3	(New Zealand) Scott McLaughlin	Team Penske	Chevrolet	00:59.7342
2	26	(United States) Colton Herta	Andretti Autosport with Curb-Agajanian	Honda	01:00.0851
3	60	(France) Simon Pagenaud	Meyer Shank Racing	Honda	01:00.0853

== Qualifying ==
=== Qualifying classification ===
Pos	No.	Driver	Team	Engine	Time				Final grid
Pos	No.	Driver	Team	Engine	Round 1		Round 2	Round 3	Final grid
Pos	No.	Driver	Team	Engine	Group 1	Group 2	Round 2	Round 3	Final grid
1	3	(New Zealand) Scott McLaughlin	Team Penske	Chevrolet	N/A	00:59.5846	00:59.5157	**00:59.4821**	1
2	12	(Australia) Will Power **W**	Team Penske	Chevrolet	N/A	**00:59.3929**	**00:59.3466**	00:59.6058	2
3	26	(United States) Colton Herta **W**	Andretti Autosport with Curb-Agajanian	Honda	**00:59.4662**	N/A	00:59.4051	00:59.7104	3
4	21	(Netherlands) Rinus VeeKay	Ed Carpenter Racing	Chevrolet	00:59.8046	N/A	00:59.6232	00:59.8102	4
5	28	(France) Romain Grosjean	Andretti Autosport	Honda	N/A	00:59.6267	00:59.5559	00:59.8116	5
6	60	(France) Simon Pagenaud	Meyer Shank Racing	Honda	N/A	00:59.7039	00:59.5881	01:00.2041	6
7	9	(New Zealand) Scott Dixon	Chip Ganassi Racing	Honda	00:59.8106	N/A	00:59.7579	N/A	7
8	8	(Sweden) Marcus Ericsson	Chip Ganassi Racing	Honda	N/A	00:59.8815	00:59.8241	N/A	8
9	2	(United States) Josef Newgarden **W**	Team Penske	Chevrolet	00:59.9148	N/A	00:59.8862	N/A	9
10	10	(Spain) Álex Palou	Chip Ganassi Racing	Honda	N/A	00:59.8956	00:59.9584	N/A	10
11	15	(United States) Graham Rahal **W**	Rahal Letterman Lanigan Racing	Honda	00:59.7760	N/A	00:59.9870	N/A	11
12	14	(United States) Kyle Kirkwood **R**	A. J. Foyt Enterprises	Chevrolet	00:59.8534	N/A	01:00.2616	N/A	12
13	27	(United States) Alexander Rossi	Andretti Autosport	Honda	00:59.9931	N/A	N/A	N/A	13
14	4	(Canada) Dalton Kellett	A. J. Foyt Enterprises	Chevrolet	N/A	00:59.9521	N/A	N/A	14
15	30	(Denmark) Christian Lundgaard **R**	Rahal Letterman Lanigan Racing	Honda	01:00.0276	N/A	N/A	N/A	15
16	5	(Mexico) Pato O'Ward	Arrow McLaren SP	Chevrolet	N/A	01:00.0021	N/A	N/A	16
17	06	(Brazil) Hélio Castroneves **W**	Meyer Shank Racing	Honda	01:00.1426	N/A	N/A	N/A	17
18	29	(Canada) Devlin DeFrancesco **R**	Andretti Steinbrenner Autosport	Honda	N/A	01:00.0850	N/A	N/A	18
19	77	(United Kingdom) Callum Ilott **R**	Juncos Hollinger Racing	Chevrolet	01:00.2121	N/A	N/A	N/A	19
20	20	(United States) Conor Daly	Ed Carpenter Racing	Chevrolet	N/A	01:00.1921	N/A	N/A	20
21	7	(Sweden) Felix Rosenqvist	Arrow McLaren SP	Chevrolet	01:00.3918	N/A	N/A	N/A	21
22	51	(Japan) Takuma Sato	Dale Coyne Racing with Rick Ware Racing	Honda	N/A	01:00.2930	N/A	N/A	22
23	45	(United Kingdom) Jack Harvey	Rahal Letterman Lanigan Racing	Honda	01:00.5333	N/A	N/A	N/A	22
24	18	(United States) David Malukas **R**	Dale Coyne Racing with HMD Motorsports	Honda	N/A	01:00.4601	N/A	N/A	24
25	11	(Colombia) Tatiana Calderón **R**	A. J. Foyt Enterprises	Chevrolet	01:00.9391	N/A	N/A	N/A	25
26	48	(United States) Jimmie Johnson	Chip Ganassi Racing	Honda	N/A	01:01.0273	N/A	N/A	26

Notes

- **Bold text** indicates fastest time set in session.

== Warmup ==
Top Warmup Speeds
Pos	No.	Driver	Team	Engine	Lap Time
1	26	(United States) Colton Herta W	Andretti Autosport with Curb-Agajanian	Honda	01:00.3283
2	2	(United States) Josef Newgarden W	Team Penske	Chevrolet	01:00.5971
3	10	(Spain) Álex Palou	Chip Ganassi Racing	Honda	01:00.8311

== Race ==
The race started at 12:00 PM ET on February 27, 2022.

=== Race classification ===
Pos	No.	Driver	Team	Engine	Laps	Time/Retired	Pit Stops	Grid	Laps Led	Pts.
1	3	(New Zealand) Scott McLaughlin	Team Penske	Chevrolet	100	1:51:27.3466	2	1	49	54
2	10	(Spain) Álex Palou	Chip Ganassi Racing	Honda	100	+0.5095	2	10	1	41
3	12	(Australia) Will Power W	Team Penske	Chevrolet	100	+2.4671	2	2	1	36
4	26	(United States) Colton Herta W	Andretti Autosport with Curb-Agajanian	Honda	100	+15.8442	2	3		32
5	28	(France) Romain Grosjean	Andretti Autosport	Honda	100	+18.4525	2	5		30
6	21	(Netherlands) Rinus VeeKay	Ed Carpenter Racing	Chevrolet	100	+20.6514	2	4	13	29
7	15	(United States) Graham Rahal W	Rahal Letterman Lanigan Racing	Honda	100	+21.4181	2	11		26
8	9	(New Zealand) Scott Dixon	Chip Ganassi Racing	Honda	100	+22.0277	3	7	26	25
9	8	(Sweden) Marcus Ericsson	Chip Ganassi Racing	Honda	100	+22.3674	2	8		22
10	51	(Japan) Takuma Sato	Dale Coyne Racing with Rick Ware Racing	Honda	100	+23.2743	2	22		20
11	30	(Denmark) Christian Lundgaard R	Rahal Letterman Lanigan Racing	Honda	100	+24.4244	2	15		19
12	5	(Mexico) Pato O'Ward	Arrow McLaren SP	Chevrolet	100	+26.2750	3	16		18
13	45	(United Kingdom) Jack Harvey	Rahal Letterman Lanigan Racing	Honda	100	+31.6687	3	23		17
14	06	(Brazil) Hélio Castroneves W	Meyer Shank Racing	Honda	100	+33.5985	3	17		16
15	60	(France) Simon Pagenaud	Meyer Shank Racing	Honda	100	+34.2147	3	6		15
16	2	(United States) Josef Newgarden W	Team Penske	Chevrolet	100	+36.2603	3	9		14
17	7	(Sweden) Felix Rosenqvist	Arrow McLaren SP	Chevrolet	100	+39.0361	3	21		13
18	14	(United States) Kyle Kirkwood R	A. J. Foyt Enterprises	Chevrolet	100	+58.1240	3	12		12
19	77	(United Kingdom) Callum Ilott R	Juncos Hollinger Racing	Chevrolet	100	+58.7223	3	19		11
20	27	(United States) Alexander Rossi	Andretti Autosport	Honda	100	+59.1634	2	13	10	11
21	20	(United States) Conor Daly	Ed Carpenter Racing	Chevrolet	100	+1:00.1358	3	20		9
22	29	(Canada) Devlin DeFrancesco R	Andretti Steinbrenner Autosport	Honda	100	+1:02.8613	3	18		8
23	48	(United States) Jimmie Johnson	Chip Ganassi Racing	Honda	99	+1 Lap	2	26		7
24	11	(Colombia) Tatiana Calderón R	A. J. Foyt Enterprises	Chevrolet	97	+3 Laps	4	25		6
25	4	(Canada) Dalton Kellett	A. J. Foyt Enterprises	Chevrolet	62	Gearbox	3	14		5
26	18	(United States) David Malukas R	Dale Coyne Racing with HMD Motorsports	Honda	23	Accident	1	24		5
Fastest lap: (United States) Conor Daly (Ed Carpenter Racing)– 01:00.9868 (lap 53)

== Championship standings after the race ==
Drivers' Championship standings

	Pos.	Driver	Points
Unchanged	1	(New Zealand) Scott McLaughlin	54
Unchanged	2	(Spain) Álex Palou	41
Unchanged	3	(Australia) Will Power	36
Unchanged	4	(United States) Colton Herta	32
Unchanged	5	(France) Romain Grosjean	30

Engine manufacturer standings

	Pos.	Manufacturer	Points
Unchanged	1	Chevrolet	91
Unchanged	2	Honda	72

- Note: Only the top five positions are included.
