= Dalton Kellett =

Canadian racing driver (born 1993)

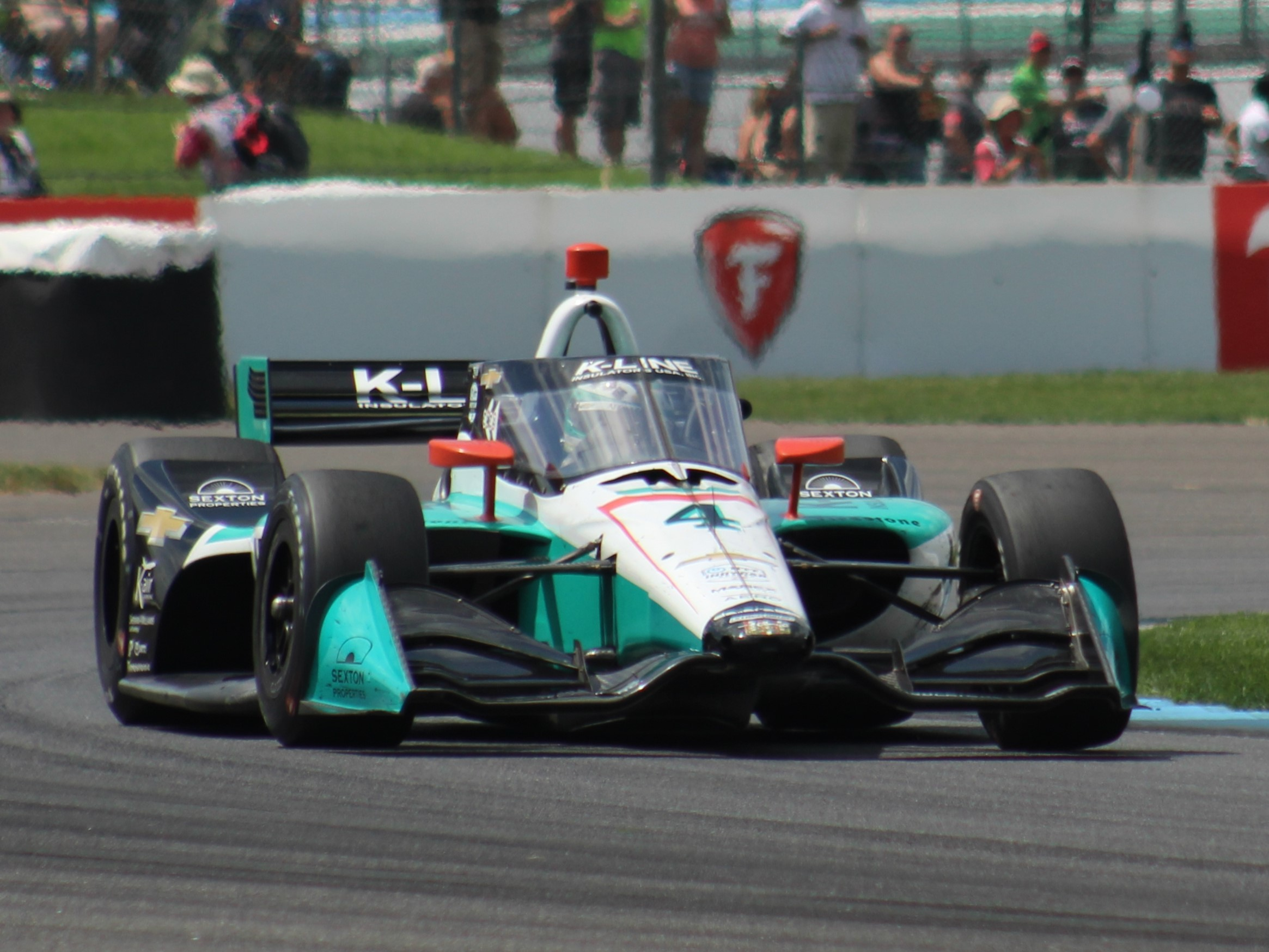
- Kellett in 2022
- Nationality: (Canada) Canadian
- Born: August 19, 1993 (age 33) Stouffville, Ontario, Canada
- Categorisation: FIA Silver

IndyCar Series career
- 41 races run over 3 years
- Team: A. J. Foyt Enterprises
- Best finish: 23rd (2021)
- First race: 2020 GMR Grand Prix (Indianapolis)
- Last race: 2022 Firestone Grand Prix of Monterey (Laguna Seca)
Wins	Podiums	Poles
0	0	0

Previous series
- 2013–2019 2019 2014–2015 2012–2013 2011: Indy Lights; WeatherTech SportsCar Championship; Pro Mazda Championship; U.S. F2000 National Championship; Ontario Formula Ford Championship

Dalton Kellett (born August 19, 1993) is a Canadian former racing driver from Stouffville, Ontario. He last competed in the IndyCar Series, driving for A. J. Foyt Racing.

== Racing career ==
=== Early years ===
Kellett started his racing career in snowmobile racing at the age of three, moving up to go-kart racing after a hiatus while convincing his parents to let him race. After karting, Kellett competed in the Ontario Formula Ford Championship in 2011 where he finished third.

=== Road to Indy ===
In 2012, Kellett competed in the U.S. F2000 National Championship for Pabst Racing Services and finished 11th in the 2012 U.S. F2000 Winterfest and 14th in the 2012 U.S. F2000 National Championship season, and returned to Pabst to race in U.S. F2000 in 2013.

Kellett made his Pro Mazda Championship debut in July 2013 for Team Pelfrey at Canadian Tire Motorsports Park, finishing tenth and eighth in two races. In the following months, Kellett and Pabst announced that they would join the Indy Lights series for the series' race at Baltimore and contest the 2014 season in the series together. Kellett crashed out on the second lap of the Baltimore race, but still became the first driver to race in all three Road to Indy divisions during the same season. On November 14, he announced that he would race in the Pro Mazda Championship with Team Pelfrey in 2014. Kellett finished tenth in the championship with one podium finish at Houston, and returned to the series in 2015 with Andretti Autosport. He again finished 10th in the championship with one podium finish, this time a second place at Iowa Speedway.

On September 22, 2015, Kellett announced that he would stay with Andretti Autosport to compete in the Indy Lights series in 2016, becoming the first driver to confirm plans for the series for the 2016 season. On September 8, 2016, the team confirmed Kellett's return for the 2017 season. He also returned to Andretti in 2018, winning the Freedom 100 pole.

After spending three years with Andretti in Indy Lights, Kellett moved to Juncos Racing for the 2019 season and also made some WeatherTech SportsCar Championship starts in the LMP2 class with PRI/Mathiasen Motorsports. Kellett drove the sports car races to practice live pit stops before a hopeful IndyCar Series ride in 2020.

=== IndyCar Series ===
On February 4, 2020, A. J. Foyt Racing announced that Kellett would race for the team, mostly on road and street courses in the 2020 season. The Canadian scored a best finish of twentieth at both Road America races and ended up 26th in the standings.

Kellett's ride expanded to full-time for 2021. He improved his best finish to twelfth at World Wide Technology Raceway on his way to 23rd in points.

A. J. Foyt Racing re-upped Kellett for another season in 2022, partnering him with 2021 Indy Lights champion Kyle Kirkwood. Kellett's best finish was seventeenth at Texas Motor Speedway and he finished the championship in 25th place, last among full-time drivers.

On October 12, 2022, Kellett announced he would not be returning to the team for the 2023 season.

== Education ==
Kellett graduated from Queen's University at Kingston with a degree in engineering physics. "His passion for academics and STEM has been coupled with racing" and "he has teamed up with STEM organizations to use racing to inspire the next generation of scientists, engineers, and thinkers."

== Racing record ==
=== Racing career summary ===
Season	Series	Team	Races	Wins	Poles	F/Laps	Podiums	Points	Position
2011	Formula Ford Ontario Championship F1600-A	Brian Graham Racing Team Grote	10	0	0	0	7	792	**3rd**
2012	Cooper Tires Winterfest	Pabst Racing Services	6	0	0	0	0	56	11th
2012	U.S. F2000 National Championship	Pabst Racing Services	14	0	0	0	0	78	14th
2013	U.S. F2000 National Championship	Pabst Racing Services	14	0	0	0	0	102	16th
2013	Pro Mazda Championship	Team Pelfrey	2	0	0	0	0	0	NC†
2013	Indy Lights	Pabst Racing	1	0	0	0	0	20	19th
2013	Formula Tour 1600	N/A	?	?	?	?	?	47	30th
2014	Pro Mazda Championship	Team Pelfrey	13	0	0	0	1	160	10th
2014	Pro Mazda Winterfest	Team Pelfrey	4	0	0	0	0	50	9th
2015	Pro Mazda Championship	Andretti Autosport	15	0	0	0	1	187	10th
2015	Pro Mazda Winterfest	Andretti Autosport	5	0	0	0	1	98	**3rd**
2016	Indy Lights	Andretti Autosport	18	0	0	0	1	193	10th
2017	Indy Lights	Andretti Autosport	16	0	0	1	2	198	12th
2018	Indy Lights	Andretti Autosport	17	0	1	0	2	299	7th
2019	Indy Lights	Juncos Racing	18	0	0	0	1	275	7th
2019	IMSA SportsCar Championship - LMP2	PR1/Mathiasen Motorsports	3	2	0	0	2	105	5th
2020	IndyCar Series	A. J. Foyt Enterprises	8	0	0	0	0	67	26th
2021	IndyCar Series	A. J. Foyt Enterprises	16	0	0	0	0	148	23rd
2022	IndyCar Series	A. J. Foyt Enterprises	17	0	0	0	0	133	25th

^{†} As Kellett was an unregistered driver, he was ineligible to score points.
^{*} Season still in progress.

=== American open–wheel racing results ===
==== U.S. F2000 National Championship ====
Year	Team	1	2	3	4	5	6	7	8	9	10	11	12	13	14	Rank	Points
2012	Pabst Racing Services	SEB; 10	SEB; 19	STP; 33	STP; 14	LOR; 20	MOH; 9	MOH; 7	ROA; 10	ROA; 16	ROA; 22	BAL; 26	BAL; 21	VIR; 11	VIR; 26	14th	78
2013	Pabst Racing Services	SEB; 17	SEB; 13	STP; 28	STP; 18	LOR; 8	TOR; 7	TOR; 9	MOH; 6	MOH; 11	MOH; 24	LAG; 16	LAG; 22	HOU; 13	HOU; 14	16th	102

==== Pro Mazda Championship ====
Year	Team	1	2	3	4	5	6	7	8	9	10	11	12	13	14	15	16	17	Rank	Points
2013	Team Pelfrey	AUS	AUS	STP	STP	IND	IOW	TOR	TOR	MOS; 10	MOS; 8	MOH	MOH	TRO	TRO	HOU	HOU		NC	0*
2014	Team Pelfrey	STP; 9	STP; 11	BAR; 10	BAR; 11	IMS; 4	IMS; 19	LOR; DNS	HOU; 3	HOU; 7	MOH; 8	MOH; 8	MIL; 11	SON; 7	SON; 10				10th	160
2015	Andretti Autosport	STP; 7	STP; 7	LOU; 7	LOU; C	BAR; 15	BAR; 6	IMS; 11	IMS; 13	IMS; 11	LOR; 13	TOR; 17	TOR; DNS	IOW; 2	MOH; 9	MOH; 8	LAG; 6	LAG; 5	10th	187

^{*} Kellett was an unregistered driver for the 2013 Pro Mazda season.

==== Indy Lights ====
Year	Team	1	2	3	4	5	6	7	8	9	10	11	12	13	14	15	16	17	18	Rank	Points	Ref
2013	Pabst Racing	STP	ALA	LBH	INDY	MIL	IOW	POC	TOR	MOH	BAL; 10	HOU	FON							19th	20	
2016	Andretti Autosport	STP; 15	STP; 10	PHX; 10	ALA; 9	ALA; 9	IMS; 16	IMS; 12	INDY; 3	RDA; 14	RDA; 12	IOW; 9	TOR; 8	TOR; 11	MOH; 11	MOH; 9	WGL; 11	LAG; 7	LAG; 13	10th	193	
2017	Andretti Autosport	STP; 12	STP; 12	ALA; 6	ALA; 10	IMS; 13	IMS; 9	INDY; 3	ROA; 9	ROA; 9	IOW; 3	TOR; 12	TOR; 9	MOH; 7	MOH; 13	GMP; 7	WGL; 13			12th	198	
2018	Andretti Autosport	STP; 8	STP; 6	ALA; 6	ALA; 6	IMS; 7	IMS; 6	**INDY**; 3	ROA; 7	ROA; 6	IOW; 5	TOR; 5	TOR; 5	MOH; 3	MOH; 5	GTW; 7	POR; 7	POR; 7		7th	299	
2019	Juncos Racing	STP; 10	STP; 8	COA; 9	COA; 9	IMS; 8	IMS; 7	INDY; 5	RDA; 8	RDA; 7	TOR; 8	TOR; 3	MOH; 7	MOH; 8	GTW; 6	POR; 5	POR; 6	LAG; 6	LAG; 6	7th	275	

==== IndyCar Series ====
(key) (Races in bold indicate pole position; races in italics indicate fastest lap)

Year	Team	No.	Chassis	Engine	1	2	3	4	5	6	7	8	9	10	11	12	13	14	15	16	17	Rank	Points	Ref
2020	A. J. Foyt Enterprises	14	Dallara DW12	Chevrolet	TXS	IMS; 21	ROA; 20	ROA; 20	IOW	IOW				MOH; 22	MOH; 21							26th	67	
2020	A. J. Foyt Enterprises	41	Dallara DW12	Chevrolet							INDY; 31	GTW	GTW			IMS; 24	IMS; 25	STP				26th	67	
2021	A. J. Foyt Enterprises	4	Dallara DW12	Chevrolet	ALA; 18	STP; 23	TXS; 18	TXS; 23	IMS; 20	INDY; 23	DET; 18	DET; 23	ROA; 25	MOH; 21	NSH; 23	IMS; 26	GTW; 12	POR; 26	LAG; 23	LBH; 19		23rd	148	
2022	A. J. Foyt Enterprises	4	Dallara DW12	Chevrolet	STP; 25	TXS; 17	LBH; 26	ALA; 23	IMS; 27	INDY; 27	DET; 20	ROA; 23	MOH; 22	TOR; 24	IOW; 20	IOW; 22	IMS; 21	NSH; 25	GTW; 18	POR; 22	LAG; 25	25th	133	

* Season still in progress.

==== Indianapolis 500 ====
Year	Chassis	Engine	Start	Finish	Team
2020	Dallara	Chevrolet	24	31	A. J. Foyt Enterprises
2021	Dallara	Chevrolet	30	23	A. J. Foyt Enterprises
2022	Dallara	Chevrolet	29	27	A. J. Foyt Enterprises
