= 2022 Acura Grand Prix of Long Beach =

Indycar race held in Long Beach, California

(United States) 2022 Acura Grand Prix of Long Beach
Race details
3rd round of the 2022 IndyCar season
← Previous race	Next race →
- Date: April 10, 2022
- Official name: Acura Grand Prix of Long Beach
- Location: Streets of Long Beach
- Course: Temporary road course 1.968 mi / 3.167 km
- Distance: 85 laps 167.28 mi / 269.211 km

Pole position
- Driver: (United States) Colton Herta (Andretti Autosport with Curb-Agajanian)
- Time: 01:05.3095

Fastest lap
- Driver: (Spain) Álex Palou (Chip Ganassi Racing)
- Time: 01:07.2359 (on lap 29 of 85)

Podium
- First: (United States) Josef Newgarden (Team Penske)
- Second: (France) Romain Grosjean (Andretti Autosport)
- Third: (Spain) Álex Palou (Chip Ganassi Racing)

Chronology
Previous	Next
2021	2023

The 2022 Acura Grand Prix of Long Beach was the third round of the 2022 IndyCar season. The race was held on April 10, 2022, in Long Beach, California on the Streets of Long Beach. The race lasted for 85 laps.

== Entry list ==
Key	Meaning
R	Rookie
W	Past winner

No.	Driver	Team	Engine
2	(United States) Josef Newgarden	Team Penske	Chevrolet
3	(New Zealand) Scott McLaughlin	Team Penske	Chevrolet
4	(Canada) Dalton Kellett	A. J. Foyt Enterprises	Chevrolet
5	(Mexico) Patricio O'Ward	Arrow McLaren SP	Chevrolet
06	(Brazil) Hélio Castroneves W	Meyer Shank Racing	Honda
7	(Sweden) Felix Rosenqvist	Arrow McLaren SP	Chevrolet
8	(Sweden) Marcus Ericsson	Chip Ganassi Racing	Honda
9	(New Zealand) Scott Dixon W	Chip Ganassi Racing	Honda
10	(Spain) Álex Palou	Chip Ganassi Racing	Honda
11	(Colombia) Tatiana Calderón R	A. J. Foyt Enterprises	Chevrolet
12	(Australia) Will Power W	Team Penske	Chevrolet
14	(United States) Kyle Kirkwood R	A. J. Foyt Enterprises	Chevrolet
15	(United States) Graham Rahal	Rahal Letterman Lanigan Racing	Honda
18	(United States) David Malukas R	Dale Coyne Racing with HMD Motorsports	Honda
20	(United States) Conor Daly	Ed Carpenter Racing	Chevrolet
21	(Netherlands) Rinus VeeKay	Ed Carpenter Racing	Chevrolet
26	(United States) Colton Herta W	Andretti Autosport	Honda
27	(United States) Alexander Rossi W	Andretti Autosport	Honda
28	(France) Romain Grosjean	Andretti Autosport	Honda
29	(Canada) Devlin DeFrancesco R	Andretti Steinbrenner Autosport	Honda
30	(Denmark) Christian Lundgaard R	Rahal Letterman Lanigan Racing	Honda
45	(United Kingdom) Jack Harvey	Rahal Letterman Lanigan Racing	Honda
48	(United States) Jimmie Johnson	Chip Ganassi Racing	Honda
51	(Japan) Takuma Sato W	Dale Coyne Racing with Rick Ware Racing	Honda
60	(France) Simon Pagenaud W	Meyer Shank Racing	Honda
77	(United Kingdom) Callum Ilott R	Juncos Hollinger Racing	Chevrolet

== Practice ==
=== Practice 1 ===
Jimmie Johnson crashed out of turn 6 during this practice session causing an injury to his hand.

Top Practice Speeds
Pos	No.	Driver	Team	Engine	Lap Time
1	60	(France) Simon Pagenaud W	Meyer Shank Racing	Honda	01:07.1991
2	27	(United States) Alexander Rossi W	Andretti Autosport	Honda	01:07.6012
3	3	(New Zealand) Scott McLaughlin	Team Penske	Chevrolet	01:07.6720
OFFICIAL REPORT

=== Practice 2 ===
Top Practice Speeds
Pos	No.	Driver	Team	Engine	Lap Time
1	28	(France) Romain Grosjean	Andretti Autosport	Honda	01:05.6520
2	26	(United States) Colton Herta W	Andretti Autosport	Honda	01:05.6971
3	12	(Australia) Will Power W	Team Penske	Chevrolet	01:05.9383
[ OFFICIAL REPORT]

== Qualifying ==
=== Qualifying classification ===
Rookie Devlin DeFrancesco took a six place grid penalty for avoidable contact from the previous race.

Pos	No.	Driver	Team	Engine	Time				Final grid
Pos	No.	Driver	Team	Engine	Round 1		Round 2	Round 3	Final grid
Pos	No.	Driver	Team	Engine	Group 1	Group 2	Round 2	Round 3	Final grid
1	26	(United States) Colton Herta **W**	Andretti Autosport with Curb-Agajanian	Honda	**01:05.7283**	N/A	**01:05.4057**	**01:05.3095**	1
2	2	(United States) Josef Newgarden	Team Penske	Chevrolet	N/A	01:06.0819	01:05.8194	01:05.7550	2
3	10	(Spain) Álex Palou	Chip Ganassi Racing	Honda	N/A	01:06.1452	01:05.7662	01:05.8667	3
4	7	(Sweden) Felix Rosenqvist	Arrow McLaren SP	Chevrolet	01:06.1005	N/A	01:05.6344	01:05.9349	4
5	27	(United States) Alexander Rossi **W**	Andretti Autosport	Honda	01:05.8363	N/A	01:05.5775	01:06.0674	5
6	28	(France) Romain Grosjean	Andretti Autosport	Honda	N/A	**01:05.7468**	01:05.8744	No Time	6
7	12	(Australia) Will Power **W**	Team Penske	Chevrolet	N/A	01:06.0788	01:05.8745	N/A	7
8	8	(Sweden) Marcus Ericsson	Chip Ganassi Racing	Honda	01:06.5757	N/A	01:05.9548	N/A	8
9	3	(New Zealand) Scott McLaughlin	Team Penske	Chevrolet	01:06.1076	N/A	01:06.0507	N/A	9
10	60	(France) Simon Pagenaud **W**	Meyer Shank Racing	Honda	N/A	01:05.8908	01:06.0678	N/A	10
11	5	(Mexico) Pato O'Ward	Arrow McLaren SP	Chevrolet	N/A	01:06.1781	01:06.0726	N/A	11
12	14	(United States) Kyle Kirkwood **R**	A. J. Foyt Enterprises	Chevrolet	01:06.4676	N/A	01:06.2604	N/A	12
13	15	(United States) Graham Rahal	Rahal Letterman Lanigan Racing	Honda	01:06.6896	N/A	N/A	N/A	13
14	06	(Brazil) Hélio Castroneves **W**	Meyer Shank Racing	Honda	N/A	01:06.2467	N/A	N/A	14
15	21	(Netherlands) Rinus VeeKay	Ed Carpenter Racing	Chevrolet	01:06.7049	N/A	N/A	N/A	15
16	9	(New Zealand) Scott Dixon **W**	Chip Ganassi Racing	Honda	N/A	01:06.3241	N/A	N/A	16
17	29	(Canada) Devlin DeFrancesco **R**	Andretti Steinbrenner Autosport	Honda	01:06.7418	N/A	N/A	N/A	23
18	20	(United States) Conor Daly	Ed Carpenter Racing	Chevrolet	N/A	01:06.4489	N/A	N/A	17
19	18	(United States) David Malukas **R**	Dale Coyne Racing with HMD Motorsports	Honda	01:06.7925	N/A	N/A	N/A	18
20	30	(Denmark) Christian Lundgaard **R**	Rahal Letterman Lanigan Racing	Honda	N/A	01:06.5049	N/A	N/A	19
21	45	(United Kingdom) Jack Harvey	Rahal Letterman Lanigan Racing	Honda	01:06.9708	N/A	N/A	N/A	20
22	77	(United Kingdom) Callum Ilott **R**	Juncos Hollinger Racing	Chevrolet	N/A	01:06.6672	N/A	N/A	21
23	51	(Japan) Takuma Sato **W**	Dale Coyne Racing with Rick Ware Racing	Honda	01:07.1001	N/A	N/A	N/A	22
24	4	(Canada) Dalton Kellett	A. J. Foyt Enterprises	Chevrolet	N/A	01:06.7679	N/A	N/A	24
25	48	(United States) Jimmie Johnson	Chip Ganassi Racing	Honda	01:09.0287	N/A	N/A	N/A	25
26	11	(Colombia) Tatiana Calderón **R**	A. J. Foyt Enterprises	Chevrolet	N/A	01:07.4789	N/A	N/A	26

Notes

- **Bold text** indicates fastest time set in session.

== Warmup ==
Top Warmup Speeds
Pos	No.	Driver	Team	Engine	Lap Time
1	26	(United States) Colton Herta W	Andretti Autosport with Curb-Agajanian	Honda	01:05.8645
2	9	(New Zealand) Scott Dixon W	Chip Ganassi Racing	Honda	01:06.1923
3	8	(Sweden) Marcus Ericsson	Chip Ganassi Racing	Honda	01:06.3934

== Race ==
The race started at 3:30 PM ET on April 10, 2022.

=== Race classification ===
Pos	No.	Driver	Team	Engine	Laps	Time/Retired	Pit Stops	Grid	Laps Led	Pts.
1	2	(United States) Josef Newgarden	Team Penske	Chevrolet	85	01:46:48.0102	2	2	32	53
2	28	(France) Romain Grosjean	Andretti Autosport	Honda	85	+1.2869	2	6		40
3	10	(Spain) Álex Palou	Chip Ganassi Racing	Honda	85	+1.7594	2	3	22	36
4	12	(Australia) Will Power W	Team Penske	Chevrolet	85	+2.9654	2	7	2	33
5	5	(Mexico) Pato O'Ward	Arrow McLaren SP	Chevrolet	85	+3.7122	2	11		30
6	9	(New Zealand) Scott Dixon W	Chip Ganassi Racing	Honda	85	+5.0605	2	16		28
7	15	(United States) Graham Rahal	Rahal Letterman Lanigan Racing	Honda	85	+5.3931	2	13		26
8	27	(United States) Alexander Rossi W	Andretti Autosport	Honda	85	+7.3084	2	5		24
9	06	(Brazil) Hélio Castroneves W	Meyer Shank Racing	Honda	85	+8.9521	2	14		22
10	14	(United States) Kyle Kirkwood R	A. J. Foyt Enterprises	Chevrolet	85	+12.8631	2	12		20
11	7	(Sweden) Felix Rosenqvist	Arrow McLaren SP	Chevrolet	85	+14.2930	2	4		19
12	20	(United States) Conor Daly	Ed Carpenter Racing	Chevrolet	85	+15.2177	2	17		18
13	21	(Netherlands) Rinus VeeKay	Ed Carpenter Racing	Chevrolet	85	+16.2460	3	15		17
14	3	(New Zealand) Scott McLaughlin	Team Penske	Chevrolet	85	+17.9291	3	9		16
15	45	(United Kingdom) Jack Harvey	Rahal Letterman Lanigan Racing	Honda	85	+18.7807	2	20		15
16	11	(Colombia) Tatiana Calderón R	A. J. Foyt Enterprises	Chevrolet	84	+1 Lap	3	26		14
17	51	(Japan) Takuma Sato W	Dale Coyne Racing with Rick Ware Racing	Honda	83	Accident	2	22		13
18	30	(Denmark) Christian Lundgaard R	Rahal Letterman Lanigan Racing	Honda	83	+2 Laps	3	19		12
19	60	(France) Simon Pagenaud W	Meyer Shank Racing	Honda	81	+4 Laps	3	10		11
20	48	(United States) Jimmie Johnson	Chip Ganassi Racing	Honda	73	Accident	3	25		10
21	18	(United States) David Malukas R	Dale Coyne Racing with HMD Motorsports	Honda	72	Accident	4	18		9
22	8	(Sweden) Marcus Ericsson	Chip Ganassi Racing	Honda	66	Collision	2	8		8
23	26	(United States) Colton Herta W	Andretti Autosport with Curb-Agajanian	Honda	55	Accident	1	1	28	9
24	77	(United Kingdom) Callum Ilott R	Juncos Hollinger Racing	Chevrolet	55	Accident	2	21		6
25	29	(Canada) Devlin DeFrancesco R	Andretti Steinbrenner Autosport	Honda	35	Accident	2	23	1	6
26	4	(Canada) Dalton Kellett	A. J. Foyt Enterprises	Chevrolet	5	Accident		24		5
Fastest lap: (Spain) Álex Palou (Chip Ganassi Racing) – 01:07.2359 (lap 29)

== Championship standings after the race ==
Drivers' Championship standings

	Pos.	Driver	Points
3	1	(United States) Josef Newgarden	118
1	2	(New Zealand) Scott McLaughlin	113
Unchanged	3	(Spain) Álex Palou	103
2	4	(Australia) Will Power	102
1	5	(New Zealand) Scott Dixon	83

Engine manufacturer standings

	Pos.	Manufacturer	Points
Unchanged	1	Chevrolet	274
Unchanged	2	Honda	213

- Note: Only the top five positions are included.
