= David Malukas =

American racing driver (born 2001)

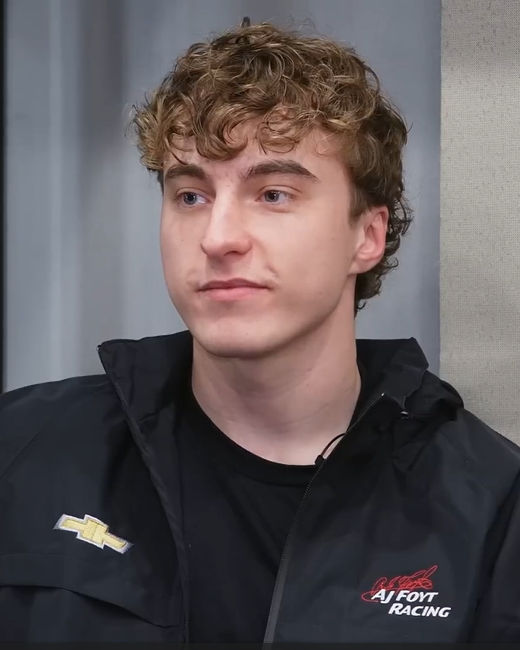
- Malukas in 2025
- Nationality: (United States) American
- Born: David Joseph Malukas; September 27, 2001 (age 25) Chicago, Illinois, U.S.

IndyCar Series career
- 78 races run over 5 years
- Team: No. 12 (Team Penske)
- Best finish: 5th (2026)
- First race: 2022 Grand Prix of St. Petersburg (St. Petersburg)
- Last race: 2026 Mission Grand Prix of Monterey (Laguna Seca)
Wins	Podiums	Poles
0	9	1

Previous series
- 2019, 2021 2020 2018 2017 2017 2016–17: Indy Lights; FR Americas Championship; Pro Mazda Championship; USF2000 Championship; ADAC F4 Championship; Formula 4 UAE Championship

Championship titles
- 2026: IndyCar Series Oval Trophy

David Joseph Malukas (born September 27, 2001) is an American racing driver who competes in the IndyCar Series driving the No. 12 Chevrolet for Team Penske. He previously drove for A.J. Foyt Racing in 2025, Meyer Shank Racing in 2024, and Dale Coyne Racing in 2022 and 2023.

== Early career ==
=== Lower formula ===
In 2016 and the early part of 2017, Malukas competed in the Formula 4 UAE Championship for Rasgaira Motorsports. He did not contest the full season but still finished sixth in the championship.

Malukas would move to ADAC Formula 4 to compete for Motopark in 2017. There he would end up finishing nineteenth in the championship.

=== U.S. F2000 National Championship ===
Along with his efforts in ADAC Formula 4, Malukas would compete in the U.S. F2000 National Championship in 2017 for BN Racing. At the first race at Road America, he took pole position and finished on the podium in second.

=== Pro Mazda Championship ===
After competing part-time in the U.S. F2000 National Championship the previous year, Malukas would move up to the Pro Mazda Championship in 2018 again driving for BN Racing. He would have an impressive season with three wins and six podiums to finish fourth in the championship.

=== Formula Regional Americas Championship ===
Due to the 2020 Indy Lights season being cancelled due to the COVID-19 pandemic, Malukas would compete in the Formula Regional Americas Championship for HMD Motorsports. He had a successful season claiming two wins and fifteen podiums to finish second in the championship.

=== Indy Lights ===
In 2019, Malukas would once again move up a rung in the Road to Indy ladder to the Indy Lights series driving for BN Racing. In August of that year, Malukas' father Henry acquired BN Racing's Indy Lights operation and established HMD Motorsports. Malukas would only have two podiums at Circuit of the Americas and Gateway Motorsports Park respectively.

Malukas was set to compete in the series in 2020, however the season was cancelled due to the COVID-19 pandemic.

After 2020, Malukas returned to the series in 2021 once again with HMD Motorsports. He would claim his maiden pole at the second race at Barber Motorsports Park and would go on to get his first win in the series. Malukas would challenge rookie Kyle Kirkwood for the title all season but ultimately finished second in the standings behind Kirkwood. He would have his most impressive season in any category thus far with six poles, sixteen podiums and seven wins.

== IndyCar ==
=== Dale Coyne Racing (2022–2023) ===
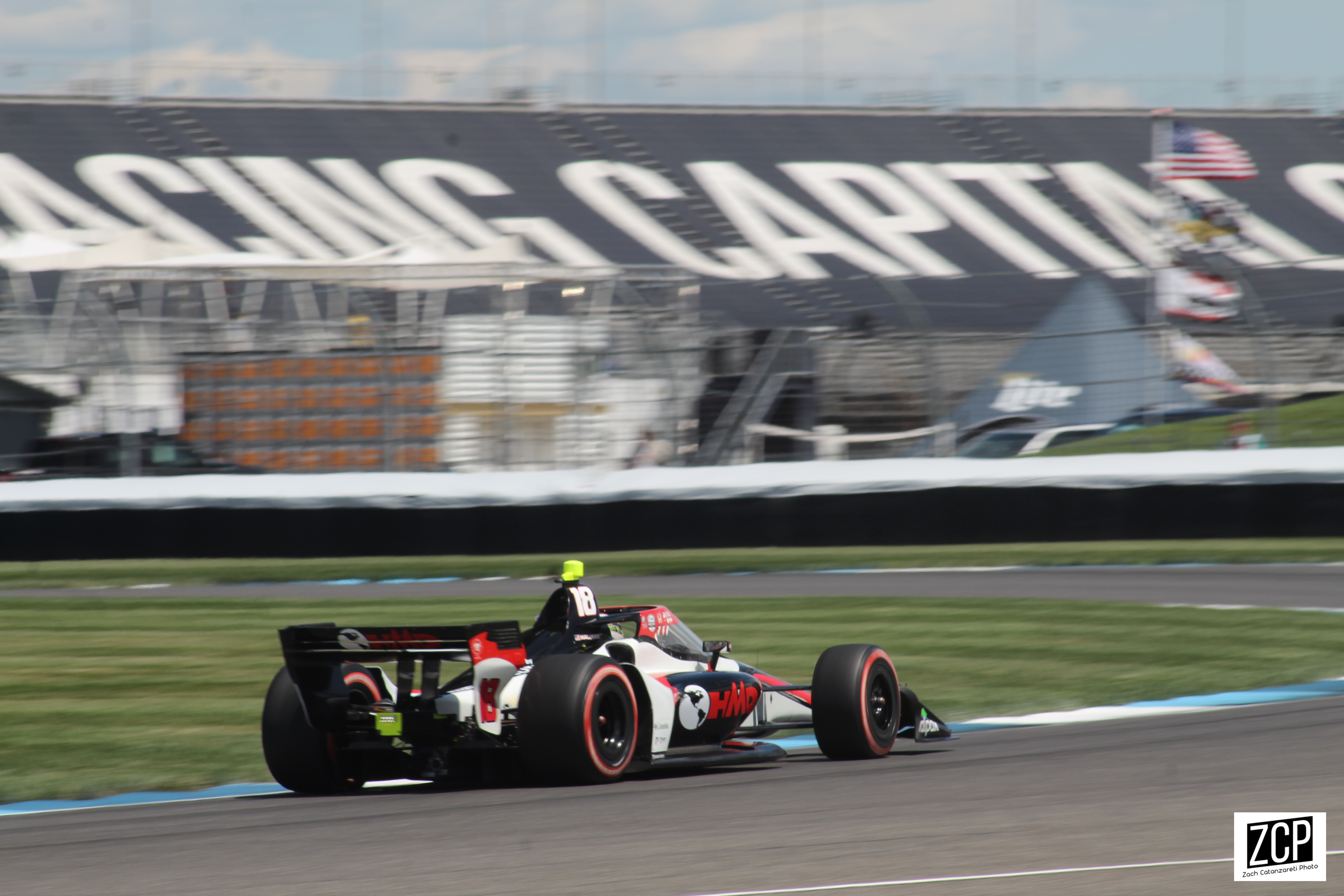
Malukas driving for Dale Coyne Racing at the Indianapolis Motor Speedway

On December 15, 2021, it was announced that Malukas would drive the No. 18 entry full-time for Dale Coyne Racing in partnership with HMD Motorsports during the 2022 IndyCar Series season. At Mid-Ohio, he finished a career-best ninth in his first top-ten of the season. At the next race in Toronto, Malukas made it into the Firestone Fast 6 for a second time that season and qualified a career-best fifth. Malukas took his first podium at Gateway, nearly passing leader Josef Newgarden on the last lap and finishing second.

In 2023, Malukas' second campaign with Dale Coyne started off with a top-ten finish in the chaotic season opener in St. Petersburg, then saw him qualify ninth in the 2023 PPG 375 at Texas Motor Speedway, and finish fourth in a multi-car battle for the win. His promising start went a bit awry, when he managed only two top-twenty results during the next six races in a row Following a last-place finish in the Sonsio Grand Prix at Road America, David shook off the bad luck by qualifying twelfth and recording a sixth place finish. The next stop at Toronto would prove to be a let down, being credited with a twentieth place after retiring due to contact. Malukas went on to the double-header at Iowa and recorded solid twelfth and eighth place finishes. The Big Machine Music City Grand Prix at Nashville he qualified sixth, but suffered a mechanical failure, and was credited with a last-place finish. After a disappointing qualifying session, at the Gallagher Grand Prix, in Indianapolis, he moved up seven positions to finish sixteenth. Returning to Gateway, the site of his breakout performance during the previous season, he came in third. At Portland, David qualified 24th, then worked his way forward to finish in eighth place. During the season finale in Laguna Seca, he survived a shunt, which left him stranded in a gravel trap, then returned to finish twentieth.

=== Arrow McLaren and other activities (2024) ===
On September 8, 2023, Arrow McLaren announced Malukas had been signed to a multi-year contract as driver of the No. 6 entry, beginning in 2024. However, on the second weekend of February, Malukas tore ligaments and dislocated his left wrist in a mountain biking accident, and underwent hand surgery Tuesday, February 13. After missing four races, and with an unclear recovery timeline, he was released by the team on April 29, 2024.

During his recovery from injury and the period without a race seat, Malukas took part in promotional and social media activities for the IndyCar Series. He covered various events, including the Indianapolis 500, which he stated helped him build more connections within the paddock.

=== Meyer Shank (2024) ===
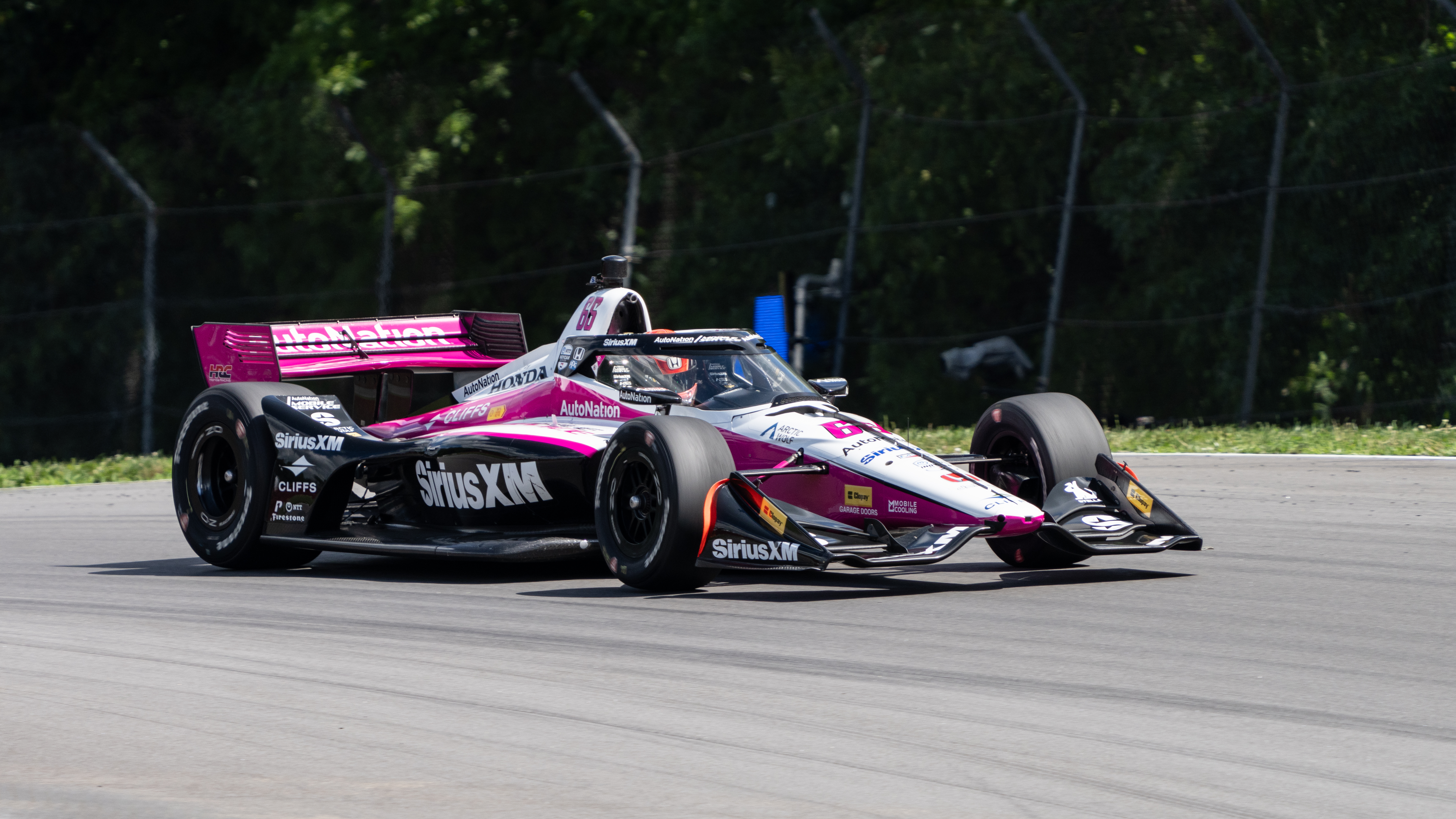
Malukas driving for Meyer Shank Racing at Mid-Ohio in 2024

On June 7, 2024, it was announced that Malukas would be returning to IndyCar with Meyer Shank Racing, replacing Tom Blomqvist. He debuted with the team at Laguna Seca, during which he spun in early practice due to limited wrist mobility while adapting to a brace.

=== A. J. Foyt Racing (2025) ===
On August 13, 2024, it was announced that Malukas signed a multi-year deal with A. J. Foyt Racing for the 2025 season and beyond. He finished second after starting seventh at the Indianapolis 500. The following week, he qualified second for the Detroit Grand Prix, and ran amongst the top-five before contact with Álex Palou resulted in a penalty, dropping him down the finishing order.

=== Team Penske (2026–) ===
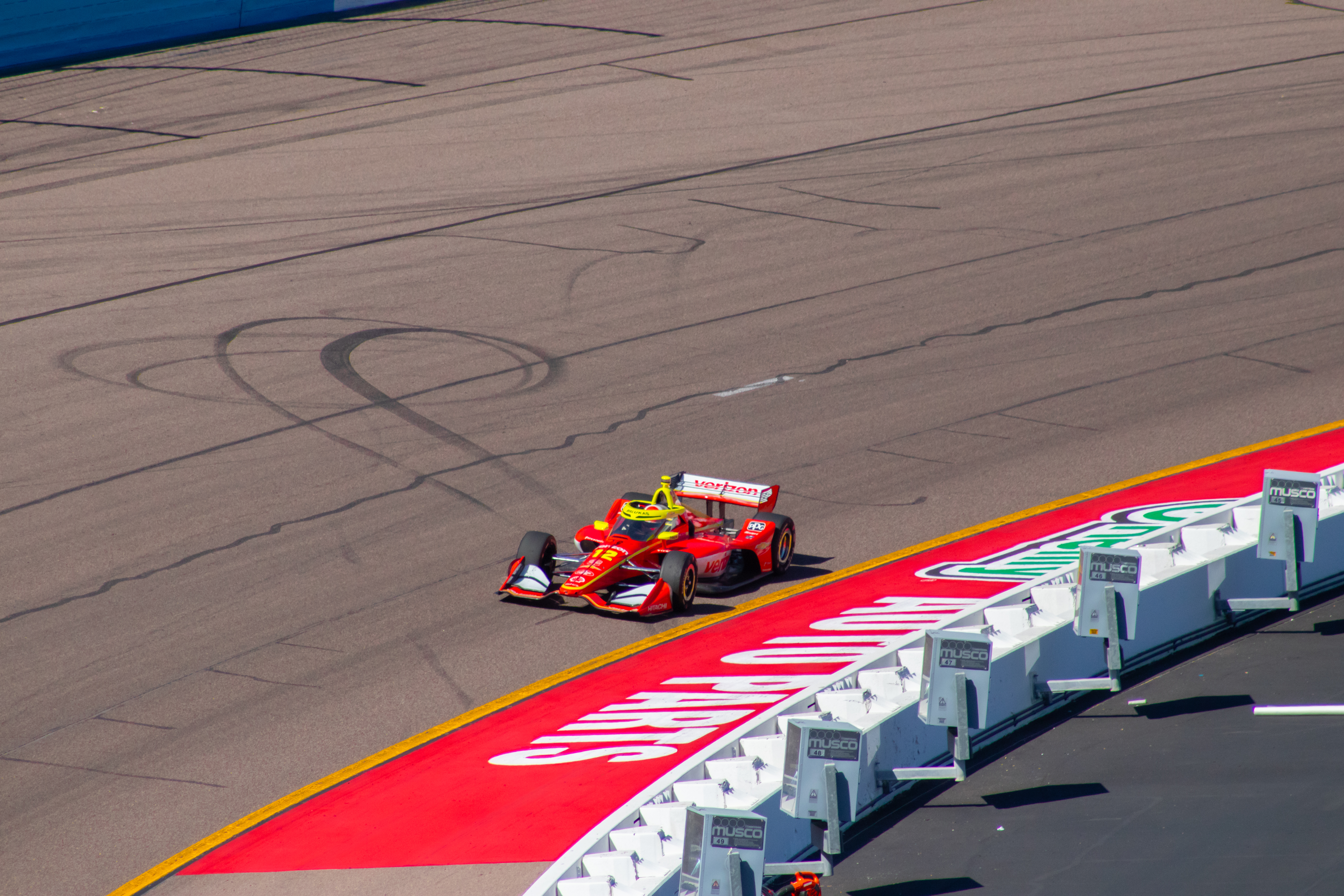
Malukas driving for Team Penske at the 2026 Good Ranchers 250 at Phoenix Raceway.

On September 18, 2025, Malukas was announced to replace Will Power at Team Penske for 2026 on a multi-year agreement. He started the 2026 season with a 13th place finish at the St. Petersburg. He scored his first career pole position and podium of the season at Phoenix. During the month of May, he finished second at the Sonsio Grand Prix. He then followed that up by finishing second at the Indianapolis 500 in the race's closest ever finish, losing out to Felix Rosenqvist by 0.0233 seconds. On July 13, he went to the White House to help promote the Freedom 250 Grand Prix along with Álex Palou and Rosenqvist.

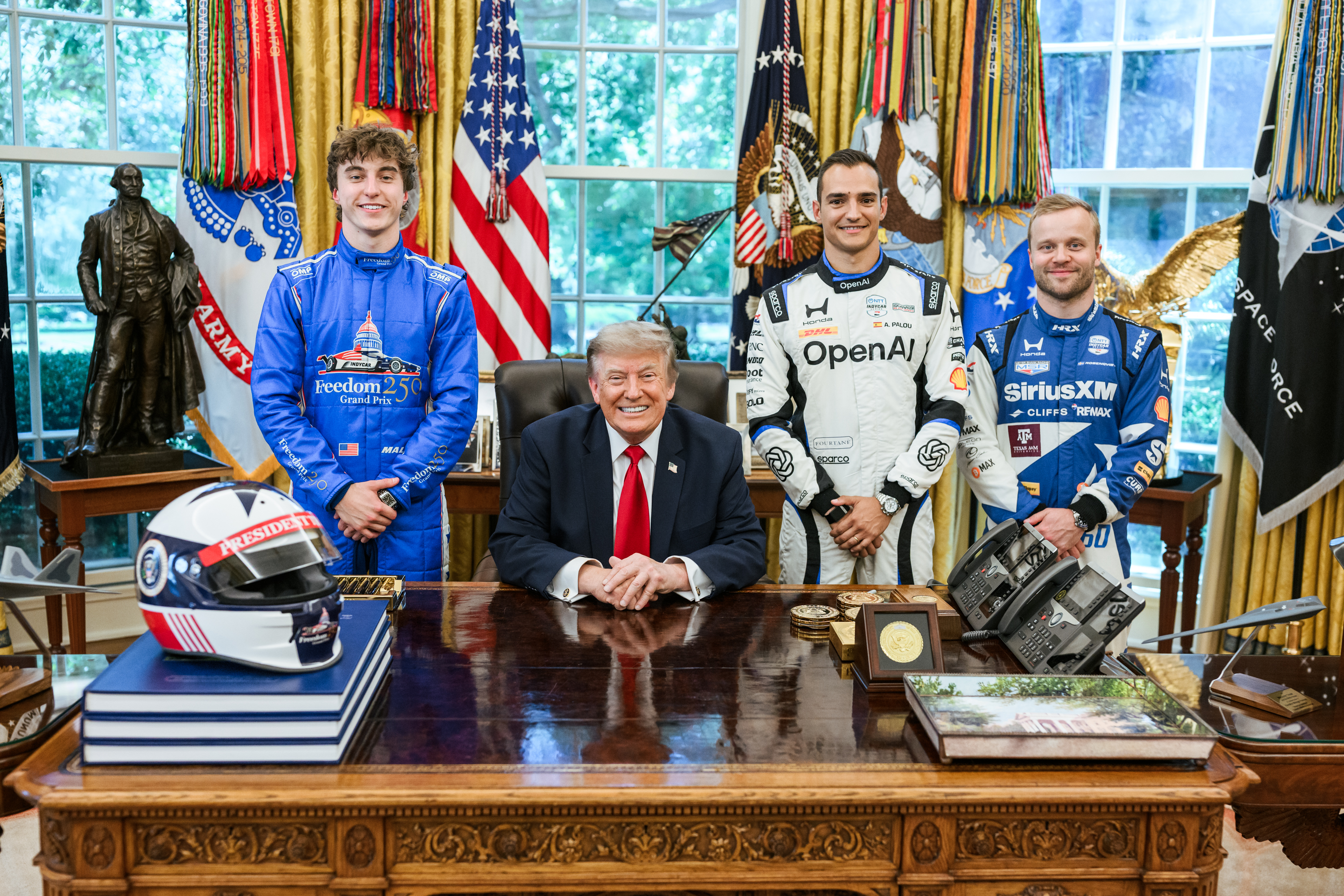
President Donald Trump (center) with three drivers involved in the race; from left to right: Malukas, Álex Palou and Felix Rosenqvist.

== Personal life ==
Malukas' parents emigrated from Telšiai, Lithuania, in 1991. His parents later built a trucking company that expanded to a fleet of approximately 500–600 trucks.

Malukas was born in Chicago and is a United States citizen. He has said in an interview that while also eligible for Lithuanian citizenship, he has not pursued it. In addition to the American flag, Malukas marks his cars with the Lithuanian flag in honor of his ethnic heritage.

In 2015, Malukas was one of the featured drivers in the Kart Life TV series, which provided a behind the scenes look into the world of young kart racers.

In 2024, he moved to Indianapolis, but relocated to Charlotte, North Carolina, in the winter break before the start of the 2026 season.

== Karting record ==
=== Karting career summary ===
Season	Series	Team	Position
2009	Florida Winter Tour — Rotax Micro Max	MRP Motorsport	26th
2010	SKUSA SuperNationals — TaG Cadet		8th
2011	Florida Winter Tour — Rotax Micro Max		5th
2011	SKUSA SuperNationals — TaG Cadet		12th
2012	Florida Winter Tour — TaG Cadet		9th
2012	Florida Winter Tour — Rotax Mini Max		25th
2012	WKA Manufacturer's Cup — Cadet Sportsman		3rd
2012	WKA Manufacturer's Cup — Yamaha Sportsman		6th
2012	WKA Manufacturer's Cup — Yamaha Sportsman 2		2nd
2012	SKUSA SuperNationals — TaG Cadet		4th
2013	Florida Winter Tour — TaG Cadet		7th
2013	Florida Winter Tour — Rotax Mini Max		4th
2013	WKA Manufacturer's Cup — Cadet Sportsman		2nd
2013	WKA Manufacturer's Cup — Yamaha Sportsman		2nd
2013	WKA Manufacturer's Cup — Komet Sportsman		2nd
2013	WKA Manufacturer's Cup — Komet Sportsman 2		3rd
2013	SKUSA SuperNationals — TaG Junior		23rd
2013	Robopong 200 — Yamaha Junior Sportsman		4th
2013	Rotax Max Challenge Grand Finals — Mini Max		1st
2014	Florida Winter Tour — TaG Junior		6th
2014	Florida Winter Tour — Rotax Junior		1st
2014	WKA Manufacturer's Cup — Parilla Sportsman		3rd
2014	WKA Manufacturer's Cup — Yamaha Sportsman		3rd
2014	SKUSA SuperNationals — TaG Junior	Top Kart USA	2nd
2014	IAME International Final — X30 Junior		54th
2015	Florida Winter Tour — Junior ROK		4th
2015	Florida Pro Kart Winter Series — IAME Junior	Pro Kart USA	NC
2015	Rotax Grand Nationals U.S.A. — Junior		4th
2015	SKUSA SuperNationals — TaG Junior	J3 Competition	4th
2015	SKUSA SuperNationals — S5 Junior Stock Moto	J3 Competition	NC
2015	X30 Challenge Europa — X30 Junior		14th
2015	IAME International Final — X30 Junior		1st
2016	Florida Winter Tour — Rotax Senior		9th
2016	X30 Challenge Europa — X30 Junior		33rd
2016	CIK-FIA European Championship — OKJ	Vital Motorsport	38th
2016	CIK-FIA World Championship — OKJ	Ricciardo Kart Racing	31st
2016	WSK Final Cup — OKJ	Birel ART Racing	16th
2017	SKUSA SuperNationals — Rotax Senior		33rd

== Racing record ==
=== Career summary ===
Season	Series	Team	Races	Wins	Poles	F/Laps	Podiums	Points	Position
2016–17	Formula 4 UAE Championship	Rasgaira Motorsports	11	0	0	0	1	97	5th
2017	ADAC F4 Championship	Motopark	18	0	0	0	0	20	19th
2017	U.S. F2000 National Championship	BN Racing	9	0	1	0	1	108	10th
2018	Pro Mazda Championship	BN Racing	16	3	3	2	6	302	4th
2019	Indy Lights	BN Racing; HMD Motorsports	18	0	0	0	2	301	6th
2020	Formula Regional Americas Championship	HMD Motorsports	17	2	0	1	15	283	2nd
2021	Indy Lights	HMD Motorsports	20	7	7	4	16	524	2nd
2022	IndyCar Series	Dale Coyne Racing with HMD Motorsports	17	0	0	2	1	305	16th
2023	IndyCar Series	Dale Coyne Racing with HMD Motorsports	17	0	0	1	1	265	17th
2024	IndyCar Series	Meyer Shank Racing	10	0	0	1	0	148	24th
2025	IndyCar Series	A.J. Foyt Enterprises	17	0	0	2	1	318	11th
2026	IndyCar Series	Team Penske	18	0	1	0	6	514	5th

* Season still in progress

=== Complete Formula 4 UAE Championship results ===
(key) (Races in bold indicate pole position) (Races in italics indicate fastest lap)

Year	Team	1	2	3	4	5	6	7	8	9	10	11	12	13	14	15	16	17	18	Pos	Points
2016-17	Rasgaira Motorsports	DUB1; 1	DUB1; 2	DUB1; 3	YMC1; 1; 3	YMC1; 2; 4	YMC1; 3 Ret	YMC1; 4; 4	DUB2; 1; 7	DUB2; 2; 2	DUB2; 3; 5	YMC2; 1; 4	YMC2; 2; 4	YMC2; 3; 10	YMC2; 4; 7	YMC3; 1	YMC3; 2	YMC3; 3	YMC3; 4	5th	97

=== Complete ADAC Formula 4 Championship results ===
(key) (Races in bold indicate pole position) (Races in italics indicate fastest lap)

Year	Team	1	2	3	4	5	6	7	8	9	10	11	12	13	14	15	16	17	18	19	20	21	Pos	Points
2017	Motopark	OSC1; 1; 18	OSC1; 2; 10	OSC1; 3; 20	LAU; 1; 10	LAU; 2; 10	LAU; 3; 9	RBR; 1; 10	RBR; 2 Ret	RBR; 3; 13	OSC2; 1; 5	OSC2; 2 Ret	OSC2; 3; 11	NÜR; 1	NÜR; 2	NÜR; 3	SAC; 1; 16	SAC; 2; 14	SAC; 3; 10	HOC; 1; 17	HOC; 2 Ret	HOC; 3; 16	19th	20

=== American open–wheel racing results ===
==== U.S. F2000 National Championship ====
Year	Team	1	2	3	4	5	6	7	8	9	10	11	12	13	14	Rank	Points
2017	BN Racing	STP	STP	BAR	BAR	IMS; 9	IMS; 18	**ROA**; 2	ROA; 14	IOW	TOR; 15	TOR; 14	MOH; 6	MOH; 6	WGL; 5	10th	108

==== Pro Mazda Championship ====
Year	Team	1	2	3	4	5	6	7	8	9	10	11	12	13	14	15	16	Rank	Points
2018	BN Racing	STP; 7	STP; 2	BAR; 3	BAR; 5	IMS; 7	IMS; 10	LOR; 11	**ROA**; 1	**ROA**; 1	TOR; 9	TOR; 9	MOH; 2	**MOH**; 13	GMP; 8	POR; 4	POR; 1	4th	293

==== Indy Lights ====
Year	Team	1	2	3	4	5	6	7	8	9	10	11	12	13	14	15	16	17	18	19	20	Rank	Points
2019	BN Racing HMD Motorsports^{1}	STP; 4	STP; 4	COA; 10	COA; 3	IMS; 6	IMS; 6	INDY; 11	ROA; 6	ROA; 4	TOR; 9	TOR; 8	MOH; 5	MOH; 5	GTW; 3	POR; 6	POR; 8	LAG; 5	LAG; 7			6th	301
2021	HMD Motorsports	ALA; 13	**ALA**; 1	STP; 3	**STP**; 1	IMS; 2	**IMS**; 1	DET; 5	DET; 3	ROA; 7	ROA; 1	MOH; 3	MOH; 3	**GTW**; 1	GTW; 1	**POR**; 1	**POR**; 2	LAG; 4	LAG; 2	MOH; 2	**MOH**; 2	2nd	524

- ^{1} HMD Motorsports acquired BN Racing's Indy Lights operation in August 2019

==== Formula Regional Americas Championship ====
(key) (Races in bold indicate pole position) (Races in italics indicate fastest lap)

Year	Team	1	2	3	4	5	6	7	8	9	10	11	12	13	14	15	16	17	Rank	Points
2020	HMD Motorsports	MOH; 1; 2	MOH; 2; 2	VIR; 1; 5	VIR; 2; 3	VIR; 3; 3	BAR; 1; 3	BAR; 2; 3	BAR; 3; 2	SEB; 1; 1	SEB; 2; 5	SEB; 3; 3	HMS; 1; 2	HMS; 2; 2	HMS; 3; 1	COTA; 1; 3	COTA; 2; 3	COTA; 3; 2	2nd	283

==== IndyCar Series ====
(key)

Year	Team	No.	Chassis	Engine	1	2	3	4	5	6	7	8	9	10	11	12	13	14	15	16	17	18	Rank	Points	Ref
2022	Dale Coyne Racing w/ HMD Motorsports	18	Dallara DW12	Honda	STP; 26	TXS; 11	LBH; 21	ALA; 20	IMS; 12	INDY; 16	DET; 11	ROA; 16	MOH; 9	TOR; 12	IOW; 14	IOW; 8	IMS; 13	NSH; 20	GTW; 2	POR; 14	LAG; 13		16th	305	
2023	Dale Coyne Racing w/ HMD Motorsports	18	Dallara DW12	Honda	STP; 10	TXS; 4	LBH; 20	ALA; 19	IMS; 26	INDY; 29	DET; 23	ROA; 27	MOH; 6	TOR; 20	IOW; 12	IOW; 8	NSH; 27	IMS; 16	GTW; 3	POR; 8	LAG; 20		17th	265	
2024	Meyer Shank Racing	66	Dallara DW12	Honda	STP	THE	LBH	ALA	IMS	INDY	DET	ROA	LAG; 16	MOH; 12	IOW; 27	IOW; 13	TOR; 6	GTW; 21	POR; 20	MIL; 15	MIL; 22	NSH; 9	24th	148	
2025	A. J. Foyt Enterprises	4	Dallara DW12	Chevrolet	STP; 13	THE; 18	LBH; 17	ALA; 16	IMS; 23	INDY; 2	DET; 14	GTW; 12*	ROA; 7	MOH; 17	IOW; 12	IOW; 4	TOR; 9	LAG; 13	POR; 19	MIL; 8	NSH; 26		11th	318	
2026	Team Penske	12	Dallara DW12	Chevrolet	STP; 13	**PHX**; 3*	ARL; 6	ALA; 4	LBH; 7	IMS; 2*	INDY; 2	DET; 18	GTW; 7	ROA; 2	MOH; 8	NSH; 3	POR; 12	MRK; 17	WSH; 24	MIL; 2	MIL; 4	LAG; 5	5th	514	

==== Indianapolis 500 ====
Year	Chassis	Engine	Start	Finish	Team
2022	Dallara	Honda	13	16	Dale Coyne Racing w/ HMD Motorsports
2023	Dallara	Honda	23	29	Dale Coyne Racing w/ HMD Motorsports
2025	Dallara	Chevrolet	7	2	A. J. Foyt Enterprises
2026	Dallara	Chevrolet	3	2	Team Penske
