= 2022 XPEL 375 =

Indycar race held in Fort Worth, Texas

(United States) 2022 XPEL 375
Race details
2nd round of the 2022 IndyCar season
| ← Previous race | Next race → |
- Layout of the Texas Motor Speedway
- Date: March 20, 2022
- Official name: XPEL 375
- Location: Texas Motor Speedway
- Course: Permanent racing facility 1.5 mi / 2.4 km
- Distance: 248 laps 372.00 mi / 600.00 km

Pole position
- Driver: (Sweden) Felix Rosenqvist (Arrow McLaren SP)
- Time: 00:46.8906 (total time from 2 laps)

Fastest lap
- Driver: (Mexico) Pato O'Ward (Arrow McLaren SP)
- Time: 00:23.4930 (on lap 63 of 248)

Podium
- First: (United States) Josef Newgarden (Team Penske)
- Second: (New Zealand) Scott McLaughlin (Team Penske)
- Third: (Sweden) Marcus Ericsson (Chip Ganassi Racing)

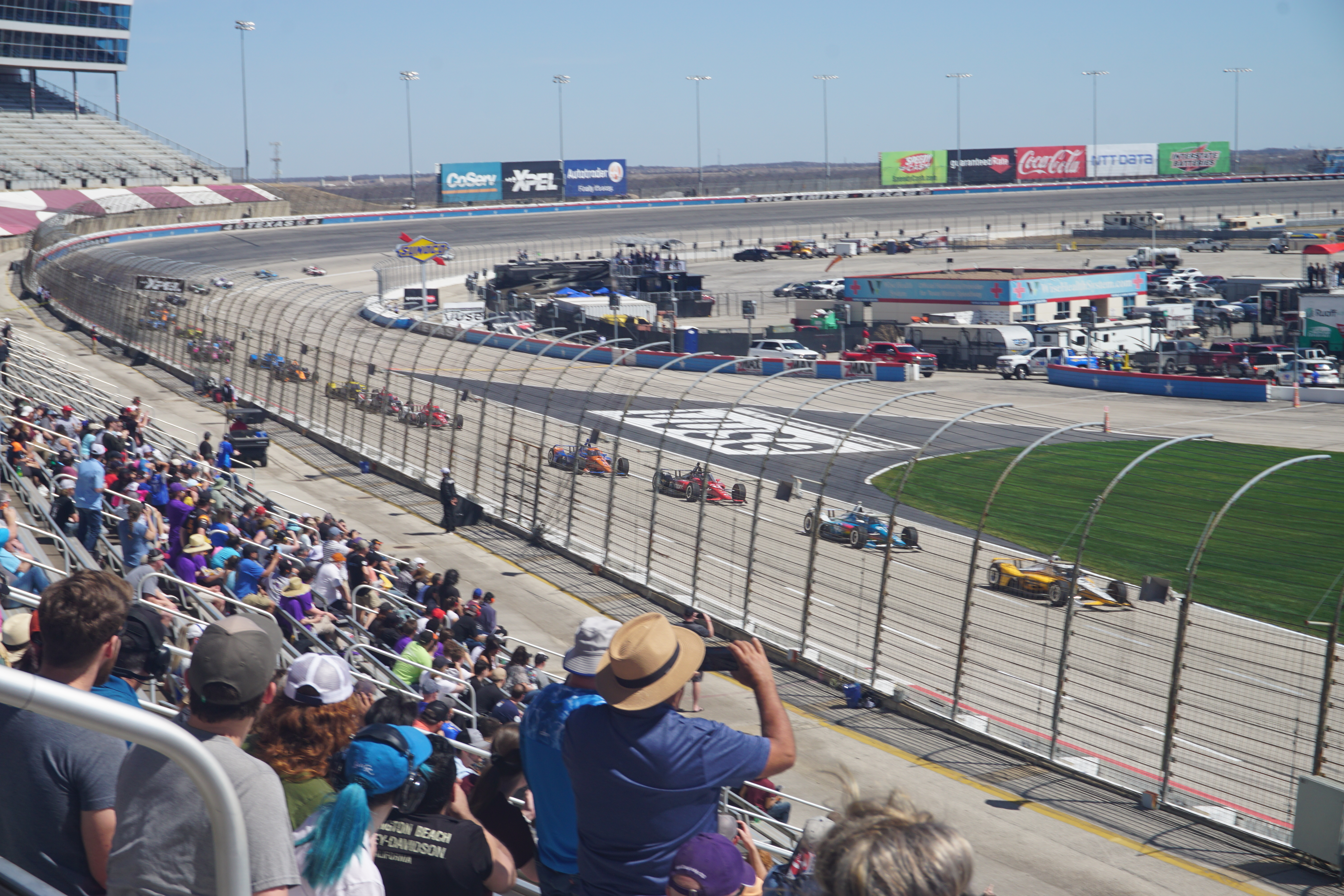
A restart during the 2022 XPEL 375

The 2022 XPEL 375 was the second round of the 2022 IndyCar season. The race was held on March 20, 2022, in Fort Worth, Texas at the Texas Motor Speedway, consisting of 248 laps.

== Entry list ==
| Key | Meaning |
|---|---|
| R | Rookie |
| W | Past winner |

| No. | Driver | Team | Engine |
|---|---|---|---|
| 2 | (United States) Josef Newgarden W | Team Penske | Chevrolet |
| 3 | (New Zealand) Scott McLaughlin | Team Penske | Chevrolet |
| 4 | (Canada) Dalton Kellett | A. J. Foyt Enterprises | Chevrolet |
| 5 | (Mexico) Patricio O'Ward W | Arrow McLaren SP | Chevrolet |
| 06 | (Brazil) Hélio Castroneves W | Meyer Shank Racing | Honda |
| 7 | (Sweden) Felix Rosenqvist | Arrow McLaren SP | Chevrolet |
| 8 | (Sweden) Marcus Ericsson | Chip Ganassi Racing | Honda |
| 9 | (New Zealand) Scott Dixon W | Chip Ganassi Racing | Honda |
| 10 | (Spain) Álex Palou | Chip Ganassi Racing | Honda |
| 11 | (United States) J. R. Hildebrand | A. J. Foyt Enterprises | Chevrolet |
| 12 | (Australia) Will Power W | Team Penske | Chevrolet |
| 14 | (United States) Kyle Kirkwood R | A. J. Foyt Enterprises | Chevrolet |
| 15 | (United States) Graham Rahal W | Rahal Letterman Lanigan Racing | Honda |
| 18 | (United States) David Malukas R | Dale Coyne Racing with HMD Motorsports | Honda |
| 20 | (United States) Conor Daly | Ed Carpenter Racing | Chevrolet |
| 21 | (Netherlands) Rinus VeeKay | Ed Carpenter Racing | Chevrolet |
| 26 | (United States) Colton Herta | Andretti Autosport | Honda |
| 27 | (United States) Alexander Rossi | Andretti Autosport | Honda |
| 28 | (France) Romain Grosjean | Andretti Autosport | Honda |
| 29 | (Canada) Devlin DeFrancesco R | Andretti Steinbrenner Autosport | Honda |
| 30 | (Denmark) Christian Lundgaard R | Rahal Letterman Lanigan Racing | Honda |
| 33 | (United States) Ed Carpenter W | Ed Carpenter Racing | Chevrolet |
| 45 | (United Kingdom) Jack Harvey | Rahal Letterman Lanigan Racing | Honda |
| 45 | (United States) Santino Ferrucci (Note: Jack Harvey was unable to take part in the race after a crash in Final Practice. Santino Ferrucci took his place for the race, starting from the back of the grid (27th).) | Rahal Letterman Lanigan Racing | Honda |
| 48 | (United States) Jimmie Johnson | Chip Ganassi Racing | Honda |
| 51 | (Japan) Takuma Sato | Dale Coyne Racing with Rick Ware Racing | Honda |
| 60 | (France) Simon Pagenaud | Meyer Shank Racing | Honda |
| 77 | (United Kingdom) Callum Ilott R | Juncos Hollinger Racing | Chevrolet |

== Practice ==
=== Practice 1 ===
Top Practice Speeds
| Pos | No. | Driver | Team | Engine | Lap Time |
|---|---|---|---|---|---|
| 1 | 60 | (France) Simon Pagenaud | Meyer Shank Racing | Honda | 00:23.2376 |
| 2 | 7 | (Sweden) Felix Rosenqvist | Arrow McLaren SP | Chevrolet | 00:23.2594 |
| 3 | 26 | (United States) Colton Herta | Andretti Autosport with Curb-Agajanian | Honda | 00:23.2690 |

=== Final Practice ===
Top Practice Speeds
| Pos | No. | Driver | Team | Engine | Lap Time |
|---|---|---|---|---|---|
| 1 | 2 | (United States) Josef Newgarden W | Team Penske | Chevrolet | 00:23.2354 |
| 2 | 9 | (New Zealand) Scott Dixon W | Chip Ganassi Racing | Honda | 00:23.2752 |
| 3 | 7 | (Sweden) Felix Rosenqvist | Arrow McLaren SP | Chevrolet | 00:23.2819 |

== Qualifying ==
=== Qualifying classification ===
| Pos | No. | Driver | Team | Engine | Lap 1 | Lap 2 | Total Time | Final grid |
|---|---|---|---|---|---|---|---|---|
| 1 | 7 | (Sweden) Felix Rosenqvist | Arrow McLaren SP | Chevrolet | 23.4235 | 23.4671 | 00:46.8906 | 1 |
| 2 | 3 | (New Zealand) Scott McLaughlin | Team Penske | Chevrolet | 23.4394 | 23.4542 | 00:46.8936 | 2 |
| 3 | 51 | (Japan) Takuma Sato | Dale Coyne Racing with Rick Ware Racing | Honda | 23.4341 | 23.4599 | 00:46.8940 | 3 |
| 4 | 12 | (Australia) Will Power W | Team Penske | Chevrolet | 23.4545 | 23.4561 | 00:46.9106 | 4 |
| 5 | 9 | (New Zealand) Scott Dixon W | Chip Ganassi Racing | Honda | 23.4470 | 23.4646 | 00:46.9116 | 5 |
| 6 | 06 | (Brazil) Hélio Castroneves W | Meyer Shank Racing | Honda | 23.4519 | 23.5114 | 00:46.9633 | 6 |
| 7 | 2 | (United States) Josef Newgarden W | Team Penske | Chevrolet | 23.4787 | 23.4867 | 00:46.9654 | 7 |
| 8 | 21 | (Netherlands) Rinus VeeKay | Ed Carpenter Racing | Chevrolet | 23.4540 | 23.5136 | 00:46.9676 | 8 |
| 9 | 26 | (United States) Colton Herta | Andretti Autosport with Curb-Agajanian | Honda | 23.4834 | 23.5152 | 00:46.9986 | 9 |
| 10 | 5 | (Mexico) Pato O'Ward W | Arrow McLaren SP | Chevrolet | 23.4668 | 23.5367 | 00:47.0035 | 10 |
| 11 | 10 | (Spain) Álex Palou | Chip Ganassi Racing | Honda | 23.4997 | 23.5055 | 00:47.0052 | 11 |
| 12 | 27 | (United States) Alexander Rossi | Andretti Autosport | Honda | 23.5141 | 23.5152 | 00:47.0293 | 12 |
| 13 | 28 | (France) Romain Grosjean | Andretti Autosport | Honda | 23.4923 | 23.5469 | 00:47.0392 | 13 |
| 14 | 8 | (Sweden) Marcus Ericsson | Chip Ganassi Racing | Honda | 23.5108 | 23.5386 | 00:47.0494 | 14 |
| 15 | 60 | (France) Simon Pagenaud | Meyer Shank Racing | Honda | 23.5333 | 23.5217 | 00:47.0550 | 15 |
| 16 | 20 | (United States) Conor Daly | Ed Carpenter Racing | Chevrolet | 23.5525 | 23.5775 | 00:47.1300 | 16 |
| 17 | 29 | (Canada) Devlin DeFrancesco R | Andretti Steinbrenner Autosport | Honda | 23.5979 | 23.5534 | 00:47.1513 | 17 |
| 18 | 48 | (United States) Jimmie Johnson | Chip Ganassi Racing | Honda | 23.5630 | 23.5932 | 00:47.1562 | 18 |
| 19 | 18 | (United States) David Malukas R | Dale Coyne Racing with HMD Motorsports | Honda | 23.5715 | 23.5849 | 00:47.1564 | 19 |
| 20 | 77 | (United Kingdom) Callum Ilott R | Juncos Hollinger Racing | Chevrolet | 23.6026 | 23.6402 | 00:47.2428 | 20 |
| 21 | 33 | (United States) Ed Carpenter W | Ed Carpenter Racing | Chevrolet | 23.6227 | 23.6739 | 00:47.2966 | 21 |
| 22 | 4 | (Canada) Dalton Kellett | A. J. Foyt Enterprises | Chevrolet | 23.6415 | 23.6928 | 00:47.3343 | 22 |
| 23 | 14 | (United States) Kyle Kirkwood R | A. J. Foyt Enterprises | Chevrolet | 23.6554 | 23.6842 | 00:47.3396 | 23 |
| 24 | 45 | (United Kingdom) Jack Harvey | Rahal Letterman Lanigan Racing | Honda | 23.6907 | 23.6992 | 00:47.3899 | - |
| 25 | 30 | (Denmark) Christian Lundgaard R | Rahal Letterman Lanigan Racing | Honda | 23.7125 | 23.6978 | 00:47.4103 | 24 |
| 26 | 11 | (United States) J. R. Hildebrand | A. J. Foyt Enterprises | Chevrolet | 23.6994 | 23.7332 | 00:47.4326 | 25 |
| 27 | 15 | (United States) Graham Rahal W | Rahal Letterman Lanigan Racing | Honda | 23.7538 | 23.7165 | 00:47.4703 | 26 |

== Race ==
The race was started at 12:30 PM ET on March 20, 2022.

=== Race classification ===
| Pos | No. | Driver | Team | Engine | Laps | Time/Retired | Pit Stops | Grid | Laps Led | Pts. |
|---|---|---|---|---|---|---|---|---|---|---|
| 1 | 2 | (United States) Josef Newgarden W | Team Penske | Chevrolet | 248 | 02:09:29.7270 | 3 | 7 | 3 | 51 |
| 2 | 3 | (New Zealand) Scott McLaughlin | Team Penske | Chevrolet | 248 | +0.0669 | 3 | 2 | 186 | 43 |
| 3 | 8 | (Sweden) Marcus Ericsson | Chip Ganassi Racing | Honda | 248 | +1.3537 | 3 | 14 | 10 | 36 |
| 4 | 12 | (Australia) Will Power W | Team Penske | Chevrolet | 248 | +15.2230 | 3 | 4 | 20 | 33 |
| 5 | 9 | (New Zealand) Scott Dixon W | Chip Ganassi Racing | Honda | 248 | +15.6736 | 3 | 5 | | 30 |
| 6 | 48 | (United States) Jimmie Johnson | Chip Ganassi Racing | Honda | 248 | +18.0939 | 3 | 18 | | 28 |
| 7 | 10 | (Spain) Álex Palou | Chip Ganassi Racing | Honda | 248 | +19.1937 | 3 | 11 | | 26 |
| 8 | 60 | (France) Simon Pagenaud | Meyer Shank Racing | Honda | 248 | +22.4649 | 3 | 15 | | 24 |
| 9 | 45 | (United States) Santino Ferrucci | Rahal Letterman Lanigan Racing | Honda | 248 | +24.4149 | 4 | 27 | | 22 |
| 10 | 21 | (Netherlands) Rinus VeeKay | Ed Carpenter Racing | Chevrolet | 248 | +25.4840 | 3 | 8 | 5 | 21 |
| 11 | 18 | (United States) David Malukas R | Dale Coyne Racing with HMD Motorsports | Honda | 248 | +26.0503 | 5 | 19 | 3 | 20 |
| 12 | 26 | (United States) Colton Herta | Andretti Autosport with Curb-Agajanian | Honda | 247 | +1 Lap | 3 | 9 | | 18 |
| 13 | 33 | (United States) Ed Carpenter W | Ed Carpenter Racing | Chevrolet | 247 | +1 Lap | 4 | 21 | 4 | 18 |
| 14 | 11 | (United States) J. R. Hildebrand | A. J. Foyt Enterprises | Chevrolet | 247 | +1 Lap | 4 | 25 | 1 | 17 |
| 15 | 5 | (Mexico) Pato O'Ward W | Arrow McLaren SP | Chevrolet | 247 | +1 Lap | 4 | 10 | | 15 |
| 16 | 77 | (United Kingdom) Callum Ilott R | Juncos Hollinger Racing | Chevrolet | 247 | +1 Lap | 6 | 20 | 5 | 15 |
| 17 | 4 | (Canada) Dalton Kellett | A. J. Foyt Enterprises | Chevrolet | 246 | +2 Laps | 7 | 22 | | 13 |
| 18 | 20 | (United States) Conor Daly | Ed Carpenter Racing | Chevrolet | 245 | +3 Laps | 7 | 16 | | 12 |
| 19 | 30 | (Denmark) Christian Lundgaard R | Rahal Letterman Lanigan Racing | Honda | 233 | Contact | 5 | 24 | | 11 |
| 20 | 51 | (Japan) Takuma Sato | Dale Coyne Racing with Rick Ware Racing | Honda | 140 | Contact | 4 | 3 | 5 | 11 |
| 21 | 7 | (Sweden) Felix Rosenqvist | Arrow McLaren SP | Chevrolet | 138 | Halfshaft | 2 | 1 | | 10 |
| 22 | 15 | (United States) Graham Rahal W | Rahal Letterman Lanigan Racing | Honda | 128 | Accident | 3 | 26 | | 8 |
| 23 | 06 | (Brazil) Hélio Castroneves W | Meyer Shank Racing | Honda | 128 | Accident | 2 | 6 | 1 | 8 |
| 24 | 29 | (Canada) Devlin DeFrancesco R | Andretti Steinbrenner Autosport | Honda | 128 | Accident | 2 | 17 | | 6 |
| 25 | 14 | (United States) Kyle Kirkwood R | A. J. Foyt Enterprises | Chevrolet | 113 | Accident | 3 | 23 | 5 | 6 |
| 26 | 28 | (France) Romain Grosjean | Andretti Autosport | Honda | 103 | Engine | 1 | 13 | | 5 |
| 27 | 27 | (United States) Alexander Rossi | Andretti Autosport | Honda | 11 | Battery | | 12 | | 5 |
Fastest lap: (Mexico) Pato O'Ward (Arrow McLaren SP) – 00:23.4930 (lap 63)

== Championship standings after the race ==
Drivers' Championship standings

| | Pos. | Driver | Points |
|---|---|---|---|
| Unchanged | 1 | (New Zealand) Scott McLaughlin | 97 |
| 1 | 2 | (Australia) Will Power | 69 |
| 1 | 3 | (Spain) Álex Palou | 67 |
| 12 | 4 | (United States) Josef Newgarden | 65 |
| 4 | 5 | (Sweden) Marcus Ericsson | 58 |

Engine manufacturer standings

| | Pos. | Manufacturer | Points |
|---|---|---|---|
| Unchanged | 1 | Chevrolet | 187 |
| Unchanged | 2 | Honda | 137 |

- Note: Only the top five positions are included.
