= Paretta Autosport =

American racecar team

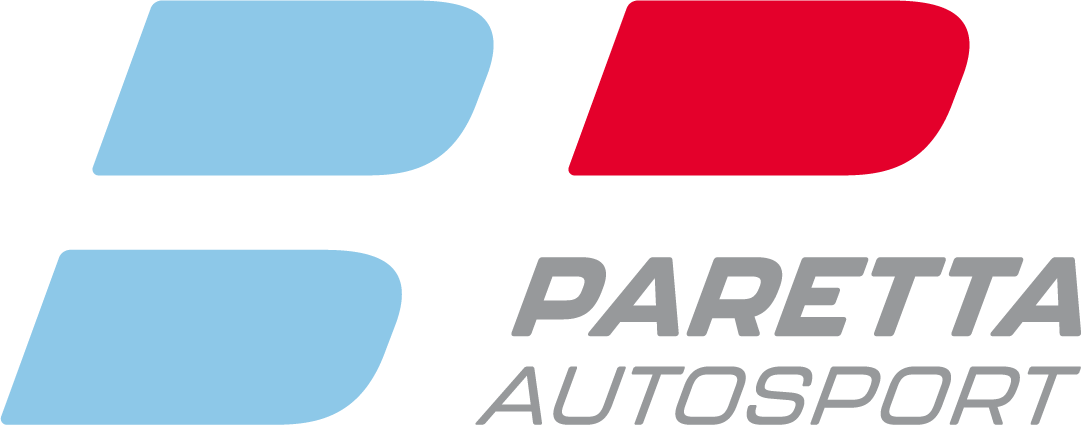
- Owner(s): Beth Paretta
- Base: Detroit, MI
- Series: IndyCar Series
- Race drivers: 16. (Switzerland) Simona De Silvestro
- Manufacturer: Chevrolet
- Opened: 2021

Career
- Debut: 2021 Indy 500
- Drivers' Championships: 0
- Indy 500 victories: 0

Paretta Autosport is an automotive racing organization owned by Beth Paretta, the former director of SRT Motorsports. Paretta Autosport competed in the 2021 Indianapolis 500 IndyCar race with driver Simona De Silvestro. The #16 Chevrolet-powered entry was supported by a technical partnership with Team Penske.

Paretta was previously team principal of Grace Autosport, a team that planned to compete at the 2016 Indy 500, but ultimately did not attempt to qualify.

== Results summary ==
=== Complete IndyCar Series results ===
(key)

Year	Chassis	Engine	Drivers	No.	1	2	3	4	5	6	7	8	9	10	11	12	13	14	15	16	17	Pos	Pts
2021					ALA	STP	TXS	TXS	IMS	INDY	DET	DET	ROA	MDO	NSH	IMS	GAT	POR	LAG	LBH			
2021	Dallara DW12	Chevrolet IndyCar V6t	(Switzerland) Simona de Silvestro	16						31												40th	10
2022					STP	TXS	LBH	ALA	IMS	INDY	DET	ROA	MDO	TOR	IOW	IOW	IMS	NSH	GAT	POR	LAG		
2022	Dallara DW12	Chevrolet IndyCar V6t	(Switzerland) Simona de Silvestro	16								21	18					26			22	32nd	34
