= 2022 Firestone Grand Prix of Monterey =

Indycar race held in Speedway, Indiana

(United States) 2022 Firestone Grand Prix of Monterey
Race details
17th round of the 2022 IndyCar season
← Previous race
- Layout of the WeatherTech Raceway Laguna Seca
- Date: September 11, 2022
- Official name: Firestone Grand Prix of Monterey
- Location: WeatherTech Raceway Laguna Seca, Monterey, California
- Course: Permanent racing facility 2.238 mi / 3.602 km
- Distance: 95 laps 212.61 mi / 342.163 km

Pole position
- Driver: (Australia) Will Power (Team Penske)
- Time: 01:11.6127

Fastest lap
- Driver: (Mexico) Pato O'Ward (Arrow McLaren SP)
- Time: 01:13.8486 (on lap 88 of 95)

Podium
- First: (Spain) Álex Palou (Chip Ganassi Racing)
- Second: (United States) Josef Newgarden (Team Penske)
- Third: (Australia) Will Power (Team Penske)

The 2022 Firestone Grand Prix of Monterey was the seventeenth and final round of the 2022 IndyCar season. The race was held on September 11, 2022, in Monterey, California at the WeatherTech Raceway Laguna Seca. The race consisted of 95 laps and was won by Álex Palou. Will Power claimed his second IndyCar Series championship with his third place finish in this race.

== Entry list ==
Key	Meaning
R	Rookie
W	Past winner

No.	Driver	Team	Engine
2	(United States) Josef Newgarden	Team Penske	Chevrolet
3	(New Zealand) Scott McLaughlin	Team Penske	Chevrolet
4	(Canada) Dalton Kellett	A. J. Foyt Enterprises	Chevrolet
5	(Mexico) Patricio O'Ward	Arrow McLaren SP	Chevrolet
06	(Brazil) Hélio Castroneves W	Meyer Shank Racing	Honda
7	(Sweden) Felix Rosenqvist	Arrow McLaren SP	Chevrolet
8	(Sweden) Marcus Ericsson	Chip Ganassi Racing	Honda
9	(New Zealand) Scott Dixon	Chip Ganassi Racing	Honda
10	(Spain) Álex Palou	Chip Ganassi Racing	Honda
12	(Australia) Will Power	Team Penske	Chevrolet
14	(United States) Kyle Kirkwood R	A. J. Foyt Enterprises	Chevrolet
15	(United States) Graham Rahal	Rahal Letterman Lanigan Racing	Honda
16	(Switzerland) Simona de Silvestro	Paretta Autosport	Chevrolet
18	(United States) David Malukas R	Dale Coyne Racing with HMD Motorsports	Honda
20	(United States) Conor Daly	Ed Carpenter Racing	Chevrolet
21	(Netherlands) Rinus VeeKay	Ed Carpenter Racing	Chevrolet
26	(United States) Colton Herta W	Andretti Autosport	Honda
27	(United States) Alexander Rossi	Andretti Autosport	Honda
28	(France) Romain Grosjean	Andretti Autosport	Honda
29	(Canada) Devlin DeFrancesco R	Andretti Steinbrenner Autosport	Honda
30	(Denmark) Christian Lundgaard R	Rahal Letterman Lanigan Racing	Honda
45	(United Kingdom) Jack Harvey	Rahal Letterman Lanigan Racing	Honda
48	(United States) Jimmie Johnson	Chip Ganassi Racing	Honda
51	(Japan) Takuma Sato	Dale Coyne Racing with Rick Ware Racing	Honda
60	(France) Simon Pagenaud	Meyer Shank Racing	Honda
77	(United Kingdom) Callum Ilott R	Juncos Hollinger Racing	Chevrolet

== Practice ==
=== Practice 1 ===
Top Practice Speeds
Pos	No.	Driver	Team	Engine	Lap Time
1	2	(United States) Josef Newgarden	Team Penske	Chevrolet	01:11.4103
2	26	(United States) Colton Herta W	Andretti Autosport with Curb-Agajanian	Honda	01:11.8266
3	28	(France) Romain Grosjean	Andretti Autosport	Honda	01:11.8697

=== Practice 2 ===
Top Practice Speeds
Pos	No.	Driver	Team	Engine	Lap Time
1	10	(Spain) Álex Palou	Chip Ganassi Racing	Honda	01:11.3847
2	27	(United States) Alexander Rossi	Andretti Autosport	Honda	01:11.6920
3	12	(Australia) Will Power	Team Penske	Chevrolet	01:11.7183

== Qualifying ==
=== Qualifying classification ===
Pos	No.	Driver	Team	Engine	Time				Final grid
Pos	No.	Driver	Team	Engine	Round 1		Round 2	Round 3	Final grid
Pos	No.	Driver	Team	Engine	Group 1	Group 2	Round 2	Round 3	Final grid
1	12	(Australia) Will Power	Team Penske	Chevrolet	N/A	01:11.3496	01:11.4871	**01:11.6127**	1
2	77	(United Kingdom) Callum Ilott **R**	Juncos Hollinger Racing	Chevrolet	N/A	01:11.9333	01:11.6215	01:11.6320	2
3	27	(United States) Alexander Rossi	Andretti Autosport	Honda	01:11.8960	N/A	**01:11.4238**	01:11.7698	3
4	28	(France) Romain Grosjean	Andretti Autosport	Honda	N/A	01:11.5631	01:11.4793	01:11.7858	4
5	10	(Spain) Álex Palou	Chip Ganassi Racing	Honda	N/A	01:12.0990	01:11.5857	01:12.1625	11 (Note: Álex Palou received a six-place grid penalty due to an unapproved engine change.)
6	5	(Mexico) Pato O'Ward	Arrow McLaren SP	Chevrolet	01:11.9993	N/A	01:11.5472	01:12.4542	5
7	18	(United States) David Malukas **R**	Dale Coyne Racing with HMD Motorsports	Honda	**01:11.7507**	N/A	01:11.6295	N/A	6
8	3	(New Zealand) Scott McLaughlin	Team Penske	Chevrolet	01:11.8474	N/A	01:11.6916	N/A	7
9	7	(Sweden) Felix Rosenqvist	Arrow McLaren SP	Chevrolet	N/A	**01:11.3471**	01:11.7285	N/A	8
10	8	(Sweden) Marcus Ericsson	Chip Ganassi Racing	Honda	01:12.0856	N/A	01:12.1359	N/A	9
11	60	(France) Simon Pagenaud	Meyer Shank Racing	Honda	01:11.8874	N/A	01:12.2808	N/A	10
12	06	(Brazil) Hélio Castroneves **W**	Meyer Shank Racing	Honda	N/A	01:11.6618	01:12.8856	N/A	12
13	9	(New Zealand) Scott Dixon	Chip Ganassi Racing	Honda	01:12.1722	N/A	N/A	N/A	13
14	21	(Netherlands) Rinus VeeKay	Ed Carpenter Racing	Chevrolet	N/A	01:12.1442	N/A	N/A	14
15	20	(United States) Conor Daly	Ed Carpenter Racing	Chevrolet	01:12.2661	N/A	N/A	N/A	15
16	30	(Denmark) Christian Lundgaard **R**	Rahal Letterman Lanigan Racing	Honda	N/A	01:12.2093	N/A	N/A	16
17	14	(United States) Kyle Kirkwood **R**	A. J. Foyt Enterprises	Chevrolet	01:12.4299	N/A	N/A	N/A	17
18	26	(United States) Colton Herta **W**	Andretti Autosport with Curb-Agajanian	Honda	N/A	01:12.2720	N/A	N/A	18
19	15	(United States) Graham Rahal	Rahal Letterman Lanigan Racing	Honda	01:12.5970	N/A	N/A	N/A	19
20	29	(Canada) Devlin DeFrancesco **R**	Andretti Steinbrenner Autosport	Honda	N/A	01:12.2996	N/A	N/A	20
21	45	(United Kingdom) Jack Harvey	Rahal Letterman Lanigan Racing	Honda	01:12.8366	N/A	N/A	N/A	21
22	51	(Japan) Takuma Sato	Dale Coyne Racing with Rick Ware Racing	Honda	N/A	01:12.4489	N/A	N/A	22
23	48	(United States) Jimmie Johnson	Chip Ganassi Racing	Honda	01:13.4172	N/A	N/A	N/A	23
24	4	(Canada) Dalton Kellett	A. J. Foyt Enterprises	Chevrolet	N/A	01:12.8001	N/A	N/A	24
25	2	(United States) Josef Newgarden	Team Penske	Chevrolet	No Time	N/A	N/A	N/A	25
26	16	(Switzerland) Simona de Silvestro	Paretta Autosport	Chevrolet	N/A	01:13.5181	N/A	N/A	26

Notes

- **Bold text** indicates fastest time set in session.

== Warmup ==
Top Warmup Speeds
Pos	No.	Driver	Team	Engine	Lap Time
1	10	(Spain) Álex Palou	Chip Ganassi Racing	Honda	01:12.9318
2	3	(New Zealand) Scott McLaughlin	Team Penske	Chevrolet	01:13.4435
3	27	(United States) Alexander Rossi	Andretti Autosport	Honda	01:13.5703

== Race ==
The race started at 3:30 PM ET on September 11, 2022.

=== Race classification ===
Pos	No.	Driver	Team	Engine	Laps	Time/Retired	Pit Stops	Grid	Laps Led	Pts.
1	10	(Spain) Álex Palou	Chip Ganassi Racing	Honda	95	02:03:31.0628	3	11	67	53
2	2	(United States) Josef Newgarden	Team Penske	Chevrolet	95	+30.3812	4	25	5	41
3	12	(Australia) Will Power	Team Penske	Chevrolet	95	+33.8528	3	1	17	37
4	7	(Sweden) Felix Rosenqvist	Arrow McLaren SP	Chevrolet	95	+35.5322	3	8	5	33
5	30	(Denmark) Christian Lundgaard R	Rahal Letterman Lanigan Racing	Honda	95	+50.8901	3	16		30
6	3	(New Zealand) Scott McLaughlin	Team Penske	Chevrolet	95	+56.1091	4	7		28
7	28	(France) Romain Grosjean	Andretti Autosport	Honda	95	+57.9853	3	4		26
8	5	(Mexico) Pato O'Ward	Arrow McLaren SP	Chevrolet	95	+59.9521	4	5		24
9	8	(Sweden) Marcus Ericsson	Chip Ganassi Racing	Honda	95	+1:02.6247	4	9		22
10	27	(United States) Alexander Rossi	Andretti Autosport	Honda	95	+1:05.3231	4	3		20
11	26	(United States) Colton Herta W	Andretti Autosport with Curb-Agajanian	Honda	95	+1:07.6483	4	18		19
12	9	(New Zealand) Scott Dixon	Chip Ganassi Racing	Honda	95	+1:07.9752	4	13		18
13	18	(United States) David Malukas R	Dale Coyne Racing with HMD Motorsports	Honda	94	+1 Lap	4	6		17
14	21	(Netherlands) Rinus VeeKay	Ed Carpenter Racing	Chevrolet	94	+1 Lap	4	14		16
15	29	(Canada) Devlin DeFrancesco R	Andretti Steinbrenner Autosport	Honda	94	+1 Lap	3	20		15
16	48	(United States) Jimmie Johnson	Chip Ganassi Racing	Honda	94	+1 Lap	5	23		14
17	60	(France) Simon Pagenaud	Meyer Shank Racing	Honda	94	+1 Lap	4	10		13
18	15	(United States) Graham Rahal	Rahal Letterman Lanigan Racing	Honda	94	+1 Lap	4	19		12
19	06	(Brazil) Hélio Castroneves W	Meyer Shank Racing	Honda	94	+1 Lap	4	12		11
20	45	(United Kingdom) Jack Harvey	Rahal Letterman Lanigan Racing	Honda	94	+1 Lap	5	21		10
21	14	(United States) Kyle Kirkwood R	A. J. Foyt Enterprises	Chevrolet	94	+1 Lap	4	17		9
22	16	(Switzerland) Simona de Silvestro	Paretta Autosport	Chevrolet	94	+1 Lap	4	26		8
23	51	(Japan) Takuma Sato	Dale Coyne Racing with Rick Ware Racing	Honda	94	+1 Lap	3	22		7
24	20	(United States) Conor Daly	Ed Carpenter Racing	Chevrolet	93	+2 Laps	6	15		6
25	4	(Canada) Dalton Kellett	A. J. Foyt Enterprises	Chevrolet	93	+2 Laps	3	24		5
26	77	(United Kingdom) Callum Ilott R	Juncos Hollinger Racing	Chevrolet	37	Engine	1	2	1	6
Fastest lap: (Mexico) Pato O'Ward (Arrow McLaren SP) – 01:13.8486 (lap 88)

== Championship standings after the race ==
Drivers' Championship standings

	Pos.	Driver	Points
Unchanged	1	(Australia) Will Power	560
Unchanged	2	(United States) Josef Newgarden	544
Unchanged	3	(New Zealand) Scott Dixon	521
1	4	(New Zealand) Scott McLaughlin	510
1	5	(Spain) Álex Palou	510

Engine manufacturer standings

	Pos.	Manufacturer	Points
Unchanged	1	Chevrolet	1510
Unchanged	2	Honda	1299

- Note: Only the top five positions are included.

== Footnotes ==
Previous race: 2022 Grand Prix of Portland	IndyCar Series; 2022 season	Next race: 2023 Firestone Grand Prix of St. Petersburg
Previous race: 2021 Firestone Grand Prix of Monterey	Firestone Grand Prix of Monterey	Next race: 2023 Firestone Grand Prix of Monterey
