= 2022 IndyCar Series =

American auto racing season

2022 IndyCar season
- NTT IndyCar Series

Season
- Races: 17
- Start date: February 27
- End date: September 11

Awards
- Drivers' champion: (Australia) Will Power
- Manufacturers' Cup: (United States) Chevrolet
- Rookie of the Year: (Denmark) Christian Lundgaard
- Indianapolis 500 winner: (Sweden) Marcus Ericsson

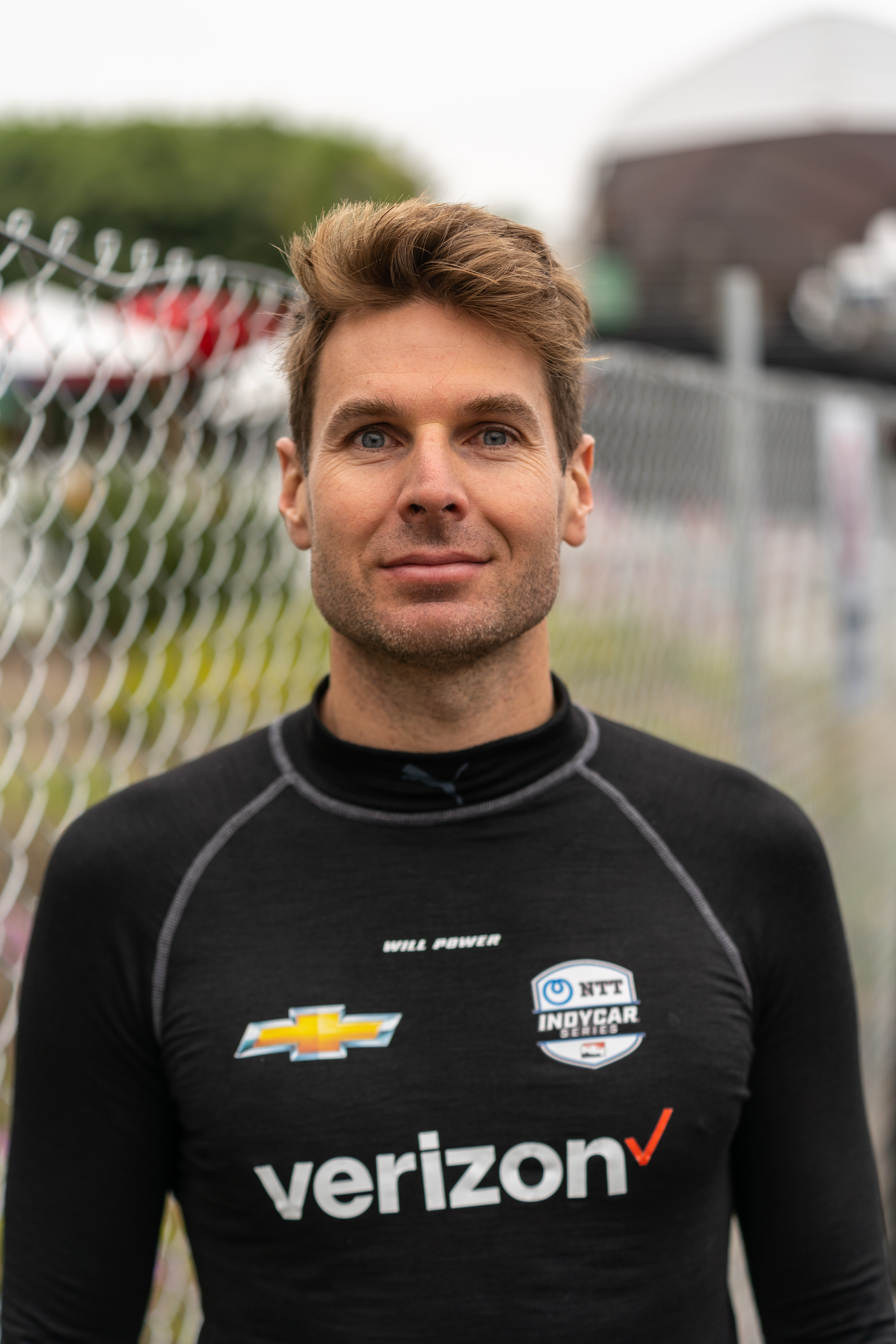
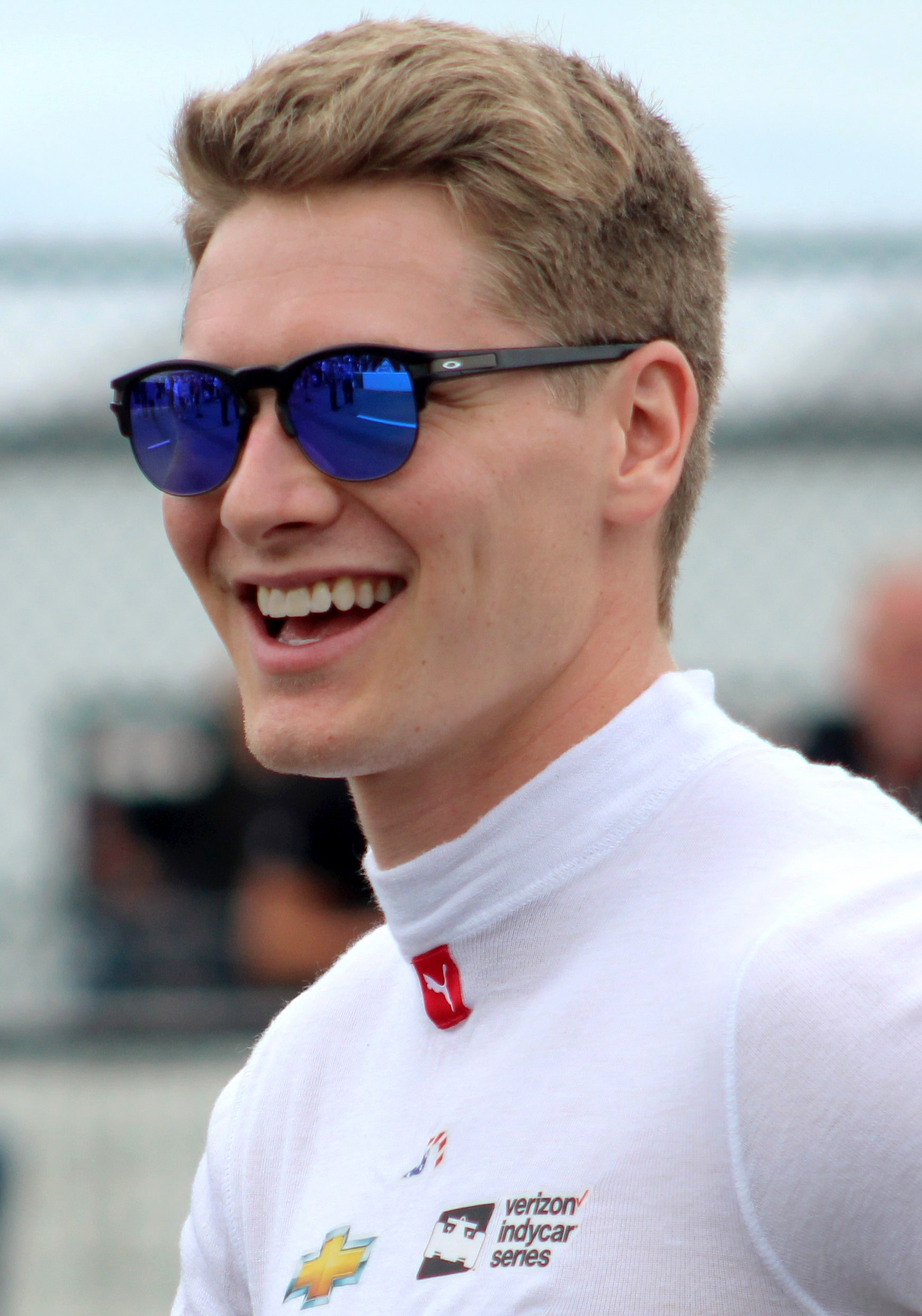
Will Power (left) won the championship for the second time; Josef Newgarden (right) finished second in points.

The 2022 NTT IndyCar Series was the 111th official championship season of American open-wheel racing and the 27th season under IndyCar Series sanction. The showcase event was the 2022 Indianapolis 500. It was the third year under Penske management after they took over in late 2019.

Will Power, driving for Team Penske, won his second championship, and first since 2014, while Christian Lundgaard, driving for Rahal Letterman Lanigan Racing, became Rookie of the year. Chevrolet won the engine manufacturer's championship for the first time since 2017.

== Background ==
Álex Palou entered the season as the reigning 2021 IndyCar Series champion. Palou won three races in 2021. Hélio Castroneves was the reigning Indianapolis 500 winner, beginning his first full-time season in IndyCar since 2017.

The 2022 season was planned to be the final season for the 2.2-litre V6 twin-turbocharged engine package that debuted in 2012. A new 2.4-liter V6 twin-turbocharged hybrid engine formula is set to debut in the series. It was originally scheduled for 2023, however, it has been delayed until 2024.

On April 22, 2022, Firestone announced the introduction of a new environmentally friendly tire for select events. The tire is manufactured from rubber harvested from guayule, a plant requiring less water resources than traditional natural rubber sources. The new tire debuted during the annual Pit Stop Challenge before the Indianapolis 500, and was later used as the softer compound "alternate" tire at the Music City Grand Prix.

== Confirmed entries ==
The following teams, entries, and drivers competed in the 2022 NTT IndyCar Series season. All teams used a spec Dallara DW12 chassis with universal aero kit and Firestone tires.

Team	Engine	No.	Driver(s)	Round(s)
A. J. Foyt Enterprises	Chevrolet	4	(Canada) Dalton Kellett	All
A. J. Foyt Enterprises	Chevrolet	11	(Colombia) Tatiana Calderón R	1, 3–5, 7–9
A. J. Foyt Enterprises	Chevrolet	11	(United States) J. R. Hildebrand	2, 6
A. J. Foyt Enterprises	Chevrolet	14	(United States) Kyle Kirkwood R	All
Andretti Autosport with Curb-Agajanian	Honda	26	(United States) Colton Herta	All
Andretti Autosport	Honda	27	(United States) Alexander Rossi	All
Andretti Autosport	Honda	28	(France) Romain Grosjean	All
Andretti Steinbrenner Autosport	Honda	29	(Canada) Devlin DeFrancesco R	All
Andretti Herta Autosport with Marco Andretti and Curb-Agajanian	Honda	98	(United States) Marco Andretti	6
Arrow McLaren SP	Chevrolet	5	(Mexico) Pato O'Ward	All
Arrow McLaren SP	Chevrolet	6	(Colombia) Juan Pablo Montoya	5–6
Arrow McLaren SP	Chevrolet	7	(Sweden) Felix Rosenqvist	All
Chip Ganassi Racing	Honda	1	(Brazil) Tony Kanaan	6
Chip Ganassi Racing	Honda	8	(Sweden) Marcus Ericsson	All
Chip Ganassi Racing	Honda	9	(New Zealand) Scott Dixon	All
Chip Ganassi Racing	Honda	10	(Spain) Álex Palou	All
Chip Ganassi Racing	Honda	48	(United States) Jimmie Johnson	All
Dale Coyne Racing with HMD Motorsports	Honda	18	(United States) David Malukas R	All
Dale Coyne Racing with Rick Ware Racing	Honda	51	(Japan) Takuma Sato	All
DragonSpeed / Cusick Motorsports	Chevrolet	25	(United Kingdom) Stefan Wilson R	6
Dreyer & Reinbold Racing	Chevrolet	23	(United States) Santino Ferrucci	6
Dreyer & Reinbold Racing	Chevrolet	24	(United States) Sage Karam	6
Ed Carpenter Racing	Chevrolet	20	(United States) Conor Daly	All
Ed Carpenter Racing	Chevrolet	21	(Netherlands) Rinus VeeKay	All
Ed Carpenter Racing	Chevrolet	33	(United States) Ed Carpenter	2, 6, 11–12, 15
Juncos Hollinger Racing	Chevrolet	77	(United Kingdom) Callum Ilott R	1–6, 8–17
Juncos Hollinger Racing	Chevrolet	77	(United States) Santino Ferrucci	7
Meyer Shank Racing (Note: Technical partnership with Andretti Autosport.)	Honda	06	(Brazil) Hélio Castroneves	All
Meyer Shank Racing	Honda	60	(France) Simon Pagenaud	All
Paretta Autosport (Note: Technical partnership with Ed Carpenter Racing.)	Chevrolet	16	(Switzerland) Simona de Silvestro	8–9, 14, 17
Rahal Letterman Lanigan Racing	Honda	15	(United States) Graham Rahal	All
Rahal Letterman Lanigan Racing	Honda	30	(Denmark) Christian Lundgaard R	All
Rahal Letterman Lanigan Racing	Honda	45	(United Kingdom) Jack Harvey	All
Rahal Letterman Lanigan Racing	Honda	45	(United States) Santino Ferrucci	2
Team Penske	Chevrolet	2	(United States) Josef Newgarden	All
Team Penske	Chevrolet	3	(New Zealand) Scott McLaughlin	All
Team Penske	Chevrolet	12	(Australia) Will Power	All

R Eligible for Rookie of the Year

=== Driver changes ===
==== Preseason ====
- On July 22, 2021, Meyer Shank Racing announced that the defending and four-time overall Indianapolis 500 winner Hélio Castroneves would drive the No. 06 entry full-time and that Jack Harvey would not be returning to drive the No. 60 entry.
- On September 14, 2021, Andretti Autosport announced that Ryan Hunter-Reay would not return to the No. 28 entry after 12 seasons with the team.
- On September 24, 2021, Andretti Autosport announced that Romain Grosjean would drive the No. 28 entry full-time, leaving the Dale Coyne Racing with Rick Ware Racing entry.
- On September 27, 2021, Meyer Shank Racing announced that Simon Pagenaud would drive the No. 60 entry full-time, parting ways with Team Penske after seven seasons.
- On October 5, 2021, Rahal Letterman Lanigan Racing announced that Takuma Sato would not return to the No. 30 entry, ending his second stint with the team after four seasons.
- On October 11, 2021, Rahal Letterman Lanigan Racing announced that Jack Harvey would drive the No. 45 entry.
- On October 19, 2021, Sébastien Bourdais announced that he would not be returning as a full-time driver for A. J. Foyt Enterprises after signing a deal to drive full-time with Chip Ganassi Racing's IMSA team.
- On October 20, 2021, Rahal Letterman Lanigan Racing announced that Christian Lundgaard would drive the No. 30 entry full-time in the 2022 season, having signed a multi-year agreement.
- On November 4, 2021, Andretti Steinbrenner Autosport announced that Devlin DeFrancesco would drive the No. 29 entry full-time. He replaced the outgoing James Hinchcliffe.
- On November 10, 2021, A. J. Foyt Enterprises announced that reigning Indy Lights champion Kyle Kirkwood would join the team for the full season in the no. 14 car, replacing Sébastien Bourdais. For winning the 2021 Indy Lights title, Kirkwood received a scholarship to partake in at least three rounds of the championship, including the Indianapolis 500.
- On December 9, 2021, Dale Coyne Racing with Rick Ware Racing announced that Takuma Sato would drive the No. 51 entry full-time.
- On December 14, 2021, James Hinchcliffe announced that he would step back from full-time competition in the IndyCar Series.
- On December 15, 2021, Jimmie Johnson announced that he would return to the #48 Chip Ganassi Racing entry for the full 2022 season. He had previously exclusively driven road and street course events.
- On January 14, 2022, Ed Carpenter Racing announced that Conor Daly would drive the No. 20 entry full-time after driving part-time for the team in the previous two seasons.
- On January 17, 2022, A. J. Foyt Enterprises announced that Tatiana Calderón would drive for the team on the road and street courses in the No. 11 entry. On March 11, 2022, the team announced that J. R. Hildebrand would drive for the entry in all oval events.
- On February 4, 2022, Max Chilton announced that he has ended his IndyCar career after six seasons.

==== Midseason changes ====
- On March 19, 2022, Jack Harvey suffered an accident during practice for round 2 at Texas Motor Speedway, and was not cleared by IndyCar's medical staff to continue in the event. Santino Ferrucci was signed as an injury substitute for Harvey.
- On June 1, 2022, Juncos Hollinger Racing announced that Callum Ilott was not cleared to compete in the Detroit Grand Prix due to a hand injury from an accident during the Indianapolis 500. Santino Ferrucci was signed to replace Ilott.

=== Team changes ===
==== Preseason ====
- Meyer Shank Racing expanded to two full-time entries.
- Juncos Hollinger Racing campaigned the No. 77 entry full-time after running the final three rounds of 2021 and on September 24, 2021, announced that they would retain Callum Ilott as driver.
- On August 8, 2021, Arrow McLaren SP announced that McLaren Racing had purchased a 75% majority ownership stake in the team, effective after the 2021 season. Since 2020, McLaren and Schmidt Peterson Motorsports had operated a joint entry with the former having no stake in the team. As part of this announcement, McLaren CEO Zak Brown also confirmed that the team would retain drivers Pato O'Ward and Felix Rosenqvist.
- With the addition of Jack Harvey, Rahal Letterman Lanigan Racing expanded to three full-time entries in the 2022 season.
- On October 26, 2021, Team Penske confirmed that they would downsize to three full-time entries for the 2022 season.
- On November 4, 2021, Chip Ganassi Racing confirmed it would field a fifth car at the Indianapolis 500. On January 17, 2022, it was confirmed that Tony Kanaan would drive this car.
- On December 9, 2021, Dreyer & Reinbold Racing announced that they would expand to field two entries in the 2022 Indianapolis 500 with Santino Ferrucci and Sage Karam.
- On December 10, 2021, Dale Coyne Racing with Vasser Sullivan announced that they had ended their partnership after five seasons together.
- On December 15, 2021, Dale Coyne Racing announced that they had formed a partnership with HMD Motorsports, naming 2021 Indy Lights runner-up David Malukas as their driver.
- Ed Carpenter Racing stated that it would add a third part-time entry for owner/driver Ed Carpenter while announcing Conor Daly as the full-time driver of the No. 20 entry. Initially only confirmed for the Indianapolis 500, on March 3, 2022, the team announced that Carpenter would compete in all oval events during the season.
- On February 2, 2022, Marshall Pruett of RACER.com reported that Carlin had ended their IndyCar program and entered into a technical alliance with Juncos Hollinger Racing.

==== Midseason ====
- On April 19, 2022, Paretta Autosport announced that they had formed a technical alliance with Ed Carpenter Racing and committed to run at least three races in 2022 with Simona de Silvestro. The team elected to run the rounds at Road America, Mid-Ohio, and the Nashville street circuit as their initial three race entries.
- On May 5, 2022, DragonSpeed announced that they would enter the 2022 Indianapolis 500, returning to the series for the first time since 2020. DragonSpeed entered a partnership with Cusick Motorsports and Stefan Wilson drove their No. 25 entry.
- On July 11, 2022, A. J. Foyt Racing confirmed that its No. 11 entry would not compete at Toronto due to outstanding payments from the entry's primary sponsor. According to The Indianapolis Star, the entry returning to the grid was dependent on the sponsor making financial amends, which did not happen during the rest of the season.

== Schedule ==
This table shows 2022 IndyCar season schedule.

Icon	Legend
O	Oval/Speedway
R	Road course
S	Street circuit

Rd.	Date	Race name	Track	Location
1	February 27	Firestone Grand Prix of St. Petersburg	S Streets of St. Petersburg	St. Petersburg, Florida
2	March 20	XPEL 375	O Texas Motor Speedway	Fort Worth, Texas
3	April 10	Acura Grand Prix of Long Beach	S Streets of Long Beach	Long Beach, California
4	May 1	Honda Indy Grand Prix of Alabama	R Barber Motorsports Park	Birmingham, Alabama
5	May 14	GMR Grand Prix	R Indianapolis Motor Speedway Road Course	Speedway, Indiana
6	May 29	106th Running of the Indianapolis 500	O Indianapolis Motor Speedway	Speedway, Indiana
7	June 5	Chevrolet Detroit Grand Prix	S Belle Isle Street Circuit	Detroit, Michigan
8	June 12	Sonsio Grand Prix at Road America	R Road America	Elkhart Lake, Wisconsin
9	July 3	Honda Indy 200 at Mid-Ohio	R Mid-Ohio Sports Car Course	Lexington, Ohio
10	July 17	Honda Indy Toronto	S Exhibition Place	Toronto, Ontario
11	July 23	Hy-VeeDeals.com 250 presented by DoorDash	O Iowa Speedway	Newton, Iowa
12	July 24	Hy-Vee Salute to Farmers 300 presented by Google	O Iowa Speedway	Newton, Iowa
13	July 30	Gallagher Grand Prix	R Indianapolis Motor Speedway Road Course	Speedway, Indiana
14	August 7	Big Machine Music City Grand Prix	S Nashville Street Circuit	Nashville, Tennessee
15	August 20	Bommarito Automotive Group 500	O World Wide Technology Raceway	Madison, Illinois
16	September 4	Grand Prix of Portland	R Portland International Raceway	Portland, Oregon
17	September 11	Firestone Grand Prix of Monterey	R WeatherTech Raceway Laguna Seca	Monterey, California

=== Schedule changes ===
- On August 19, 2021, it was confirmed that Iowa Speedway would return to the schedule.
- On September 19, 2021, the full schedule was released. The changes included Texas and Detroit becoming single races, rather than doubleheaders, and a return to Toronto, having been removed from both the 2020 and the 2021 schedules due to travel restrictions from the COVID-19 pandemic.
- St Petersburg was returned to the opening race of the season and was run in February, marking the earliest season start since 2000.
- Texas was moved to the 2nd race of the season and was held on March 20.
- Long Beach returned to its traditional date in April, having been moved to September the previous season.
- On November 3, 2021, the Detroit City Council and Penske Entertainment reached an agreement to move the Detroit Grand Prix back to the downtown streets around The Renaissance Center, making the 2022 event the final time IndyCar raced at Belle Isle.

== Results ==
Rd.	Race	Pole position	Fastest lap	Most laps led	Race Winner			Report
Rd.	Race	Pole position	Fastest lap	Most laps led	Driver	Team	Manufacturer	Report
1	St. Petersburg	(New Zealand) Scott McLaughlin	(United States) Conor Daly	(New Zealand) Scott McLaughlin	(New Zealand) Scott McLaughlin	Team Penske	Chevrolet	Report
2	Texas	(Sweden) Felix Rosenqvist	(Mexico) Pato O'Ward	(New Zealand) Scott McLaughlin	(United States) Josef Newgarden	Team Penske	Chevrolet	Report
3	Long Beach	(United States) Colton Herta	(Spain) Álex Palou	(United States) Josef Newgarden	(United States) Josef Newgarden	Team Penske	Chevrolet	Report
4	Birmingham	(Netherlands) Rinus VeeKay	(Spain) Álex Palou	(Netherlands) Rinus VeeKay	(Mexico) Pato O'Ward	Arrow McLaren SP	Chevrolet	Report
5	IMS GMR GP	(Australia) Will Power	(United States) Colton Herta	(United States) Colton Herta	(United States) Colton Herta	Andretti Autosport w/ Curb-Agajanian	Honda	Report
6	Indianapolis 500	(New Zealand) Scott Dixon	(Sweden) Marcus Ericsson	(New Zealand) Scott Dixon	(Sweden) Marcus Ericsson	Chip Ganassi Racing	Honda	Report
7	Detroit	(United States) Josef Newgarden	(United States) David Malukas	(Australia) Will Power	(Australia) Will Power	Team Penske	Chevrolet	Report
8	Road America	(United States) Alexander Rossi	(United States) Josef Newgarden	(United States) Josef Newgarden	(United States) Josef Newgarden	Team Penske	Chevrolet	Report
9	Mid-Ohio	(Mexico) Pato O'Ward	(Spain) Álex Palou	(New Zealand) Scott McLaughlin	(New Zealand) Scott McLaughlin	Team Penske	Chevrolet	Report
10	Toronto	(United States) Colton Herta	(United States) David Malukas	(New Zealand) Scott Dixon	(New Zealand) Scott Dixon	Chip Ganassi Racing	Honda	Report
11	Iowa 1	(Australia) Will Power	(Australia) Will Power	(United States) Josef Newgarden	(United States) Josef Newgarden	Team Penske	Chevrolet	Report
12	Iowa 2	(Australia) Will Power	(Australia) Will Power	(United States) Josef Newgarden	(Mexico) Pato O'Ward	Arrow McLaren SP	Chevrolet	Report
13	IMS Gallagher GP	(Sweden) Felix Rosenqvist	(France) Simon Pagenaud	(United States) Alexander Rossi	(United States) Alexander Rossi	Andretti Autosport	Honda	Report
14	Nashville	(New Zealand) Scott McLaughlin	(New Zealand) Scott McLaughlin	(Spain) Álex Palou	(New Zealand) Scott Dixon	Chip Ganassi Racing	Honda	Report
15	Gateway	(Australia) Will Power	(United States) Josef Newgarden	(Australia) Will Power	(United States) Josef Newgarden	Team Penske	Chevrolet	Report
16	Portland	(New Zealand) Scott McLaughlin	(United States) Josef Newgarden	(New Zealand) Scott McLaughlin	(New Zealand) Scott McLaughlin	Team Penske	Chevrolet	Report
17	Laguna Seca	(Australia) Will Power	(Mexico) Pato O'Ward	(Spain) Álex Palou	(Spain) Álex Palou	Chip Ganassi Racing	Honda	Report

== Season report ==
=== Opening rounds ===
The 2022 season kicked off in late February with the Firestone Grand Prix of St. Petersburg. Scott McLaughlin won his maiden pole in qualifying and led the field to green, holding off Colton Herta in second and Rinus VeeKay in third, who both got by Will Power at the start. The latter managed to repass the pair when their tires started to fade, before a caution came out as David Malukas hit the wall in turn three. This meant the majority of the field was able to pit. Alexander Rossi and Scott Dixon, who had not done so, now led the race. As strategies played out, McLaughlin was shuffled back to the lead, before managing to defend an overcutting attempt by then-second man Álex Palou, who started tenth but had moved into net second by the first round of stops. This order held on until the finish; McLaughlin converting maiden pole into maiden victory, ahead of Palou and Power.

Next up was the XPEL 375 at Texas Motor Speedway, where Felix Rosenqvist won his second series pole, but was overtaken by McLaughlin after less than a lap at the race start. Behind them, Power got by Takuma Sato for third, before Rossi had to retire his car and brought out a caution. After the restart, rookie Kyle Kirkwood used his fresh tires to climb from 23rd into the top ten and then into the lead as the top runners pitted. McLaughin was back in front once the pitstops had shaken out. Cautions flew again when Sato made contact with teammate Malukas, and then later when Kirkwood hit the wall. The second restart only lasted for a single lap, before a heavy crash saw Helio Castroneves, Graham Rahal and Devlin DeFrancesco retire. After that, it was Power, McLaughlin and Josef Newgarden at the front, with the former running first before having to save fuel and letting the other two by. On the final lap, McLaughlin got stuck behind traffic, which allowed Newgarden to swoop by and take the win by 0.0669 seconds.

It was then time for the Acura Grand Prix of Long Beach, where Herta took pole with a new track record, and took off in front of Newgarden and Palou, remaining untroubled by a caution and a restart early on. Palou was the first of the frontrunners to pit, undercutting the leaders and running first for the next portion of the race. Palou was once again the first to pit a second time, but when Herta pushed on his inlap, he crashed into the wall at turn 9. The stewards delayed the caution, so Newgarden was able to pit before the pitlane closed, but Palou was not able to overtake him with warmed up tires as the caution was then thrown when Simon Pagenaud also went off track. At the restart, Marcus Ericsson spun, allowing Romain Grosjean into third. The latter then overtook Palou, but Newgarden held on to claim the second win in a row and with it also the championship lead.

The Honda Indy Grand Prix of Alabama was round four of the season, and it began with VeeKay taking pole position and he led ahead of Pato O'Ward, while McLaughlin overtook Palou for third. The field split strategies, with some coming in early and committing to a three-stop, and some staying out to try and run the race with two stops. However, when Callum Ilott beached his car shortly after the two-stoppers had pitted, he brought out a caution, effectively eliminating any advantages of a three-stop strategy. The leading trio stopped a second time, on the same lap, and a quick pitstop brought O'Ward very close to VeeKay, enabling him to take the lead into turn 5. Dixon stopped one lap later and managed to overtake McLaughlin for third, with Palou repeating this effort for second place one lap later. VeeKay was later able to regain third place, but O'Ward could not be stopped. Palou's second place was enough to hand him the championship lead, while Newgarden, who was 14th in the end, dropped to third.

IndyCar then went to Indianapolis Motor Speedway, with the GMR Grand Prix up first, around the road course. Power led from pole on a damp track, getting passed by both Palou and Newgarden into turn 1, and Rosenqvist after running wide later in the lap. Herta and Sato were the first to pit for dry tires on lap 3, and the former was in the lead of the race by the time the caution came out for a spinning Palou. Herta and O'Ward remained first and second all throughout the next two cautions and restarts, before Rosenqvist jumped his teammate after the second round of stops. Those two then came together on the next restart, immediately bringing out the fifth caution. Two more followed, and by then the rain had started to fall again. Some drivers still elected to stay on slicks, but the track became wet very fast. Herta, Pagenaud and Power had pitted for rain tires at the right time, and led the race as Juan Pablo Montoya hit the wall and the race ended under the eighth and last caution.

The Month of May concluded with the 106th Running of the Indianapolis 500. Dixon won his fifth Indy 500 pole, ahead of Palou and VeeKay. The two CGR teammates repeatedly swapped the lead, reducing their fuel consumption. This continued through the first round of pitstops, through VeeKay crashing out of third, and until Ilott also crashed out while the second round of stops was underway. Palou had to stop under yellow and dropped back. This phase propelled Conor Daly and O'Ward to the front behind Dixon. Through the next two rounds of stops O'Ward, Daly and Rosenqvist all led portions of the race, but Dixon always came back to grab the lead again. He looked to have the win secured, before being sent to the back with a speeding penalty when coming in for his final stop. Marcus Ericsson, who ran with the top group all race, passed O'Ward for the lead shortly before a red flag came out when Jimmie Johnson crashed. Ericsson held the lead on the restart and won, ahead of O'Ward and Tony Kanaan.

=== Mid-season rounds ===
The season continued with the Chevrolet Detroit Grand Prix, where Newgarden led from pole and easily pulled away in the first portion of the race. The primary tire clearly was the tire to be on, with the primary runners all moving up in the early stages of the race. Power, Dixon and Palou all passed Newgarden to form the lead trio. Power had a five-second lead by the time he pitted on his second set of primaries, and he was able to build the gap even further as the other two chose to pit to the alternate tire. Alexander Rossi, who had started on alternates, had already pitted on lap three, so was free to run primaries to the end. He used this advantage to slice through the field and was in second place by the time Power had to pit to make his mandatory run on the alternate tires. Rossi gained on the leader every lap, but in a grandstand finish, Power managed to hold off Rossi and won by just over a second, Dixon in a rather distant third place.

At the next race, the Sonsio Grand Prix of Road America, Rossi continued his pace from Detroit to set pole position. The top three of him, Newgarden and Palou maintained position at the start, before the latter was hit by Ericsson on an early restart and had to retire. After two further restarts, the lead pair came into the pits, where Newgarden was able to overtake Rossi and come out ahead of him. The group was shuffled back to the front as the off-strategy runners came to pit lane, but by then Newgarden already had a gap of six seconds to Rossi. This continued over two rounds of pitstops and until the late stages of the race, when two cautions for O'Ward and then for Castroneves set up a three-lap shootout for the race win. But Newgarden got a good restart, pulled away from Rossi and secured the win, while Rossi was himself overtaken by Ericsson. Newgarden's third win promoted him to third in the standings, 32 points behind Indy 500 winner Ericsson.

Three weeks later, O'Ward claimed pole for the Honda Indy 200 at Mid-Ohio and was able to keep McLaughlin behind him at the start. Rosenqvist got third from Herta, only for his car breaking down a few laps later. Dixon overtook Herta on the subsequent restart, and when it was time for pitstops, McLaughlin was able to move past O'Ward in pitlane. Palou, who had stopped four laps earlier, used the undercut to come out in second place. O'Ward's car then also had to fight an engine issue, which saw him drop out of contention, making way for VeeKay to become third. McLaughlin and Palou remained the leading duo, while Power, who spun at the start of the race, had risen from 27th to fourth, and then made quick work of VeeKay in third. In the final stages of the race, Palou amped up the pressure on the leader, but McLaughin remained faultless and held the lead to win the race. Power's charge to third helped him to close up to 20 points behind championship leader Ericsson.

Next up was IndyCar's long-awaited return to Canada, for the Honda Indy Toronto, where Herta became the first driver to score more than one pole in 2022. He and Dixon held the front row at the start, before an early caution for Sato halted proceedings. Soon after, the leaders came to pit lane: Herta stopped a lap later than Dixon, who came out ahead in net first place. Newgarden in third place was trying to save fuel, holding up Rossi and Rosenqvist behind him. When the latter made a move to pass Rossi, he slid wide in turn 3, hitting the Andretti car that then crashed into the barrier. As drivers hurried into the narrow pitlane, Newgarden had a horribly slow stop, demoting him to eleventh. Up front, Herta could not use the restart nor the two cautions that followed to find a way past Dixon, and was more cautious in the final stages to not let Rosenqvist past him. Dixon took his 52nd win, drawing level with Mario Andretti in second place on the all-time IndyCar winners list.

Then came the third oval track of the year, a double-header starting with Power claiming a double pole position. He led the Hy-VeeDeals.com 250 presented by DoorDash to green ahead of Newgarden. The order at the front remained the same until a yellow was thrown for a spinning Johnson, and Newgarden overtook Power on the restart. He then built a gap to the field, untroubled by cautions, restarts and the strategic decisions of drivers behind him. Ericsson, Herta and O'Ward all managed to slice through the field during different stints, but only Ericsson managed to come close to Newgarden: The two made wheel-to-wheel contact on a restart, but Newgarden defended the attack. In the final stages of the race, when other drivers struggled with their old tires, Newgarden did not seem to have such problems: He pulled an even bigger gap and won over six seconds ahead of O'Ward and Power. This result sent him into second in the standings, now a mere 15 points behind Ericsson.

A day later, the Hy-Vee Salute to Farmers 300 presented by Google saw the same front row as the first race, and it started much the same: Power held the lead at the start, but this time he remained in the lead for slightly longer, with Newgarden passing him on lap 85. The race was caution-free until lap 120, when Kirkwood hit the wall. The leading quartet all pitted, their order remaining the same, before O'Ward in third then set off to try and pass Power. His attempts were fruitless, however, so he had to rely on pitting a lap earlier than Power and making the undercut work, which he did by the two-third mark of the race. Newgarden was in a world of his own once again and looked set to win a second race in as many days, before his right rear suspension suddenly failed on lap 235, sending him hard into the barriers. This meant O'Ward was in prime position to take the win, and he did so faultlessly, gapping Power at the restart and never looking back. McLaughlin was third after overtaking Dixon at the final restart.

=== Closing rounds ===
IndyCar returned to Indianapolis to hold the Gallagher Grand Prix in late July. Rosenqvist took pole and led Rossi, while Newgarden jumped from fifth to third at the start, before having to give those back because he breached track limits. Herta then got past the leading duo, before Rossi followed him through to form an Andretti 1-2. In third was rookie Christian Lundgaard. This order remained unchanged until after the first round of pitstops, when Herta suffered a transmission issue that forced him to retire from the lead. This left Rossi in the lead and promoted Power into a podium position. Rossi was attacked by Lundgaard in the latter stages of the race, but remained first. The same happened with Power in third, getting attacked by McLaughlin but managing to defend his podium. Rossi scored his first win in three years, and Lundgaard scored his maiden series podium. Power's podium allowed him to take the championship lead by nine points.

Just a week later, it was time for the Big Machine Music City Grand Prix. The weather was an issue all weekend: McLaughlin scored pole in a qualifying delayed by 90 minutes, and then converted pole into the lead in a race delayed by over 100 minutes. Grosjean was second and Palou pitted from third, shortly before a caution came out, which left him in front when the rest of the runners then also came in. On the restart, the tight section around turn 6 caused a multi-car crash that eliminated O'Ward, Rahal, Dalton Kellett and Simona de Silvestro. More collisions followed, and by the time the next caution was resolved, Palou led from Pagenaud and McLaughlin. Another caution came, at an extremely fortunate time for Dixon: He came through all the chaos left in second place, only behind Newgarden who had to make another stop. A late red flag made Dixon's race less straightforward, but he held on to win the race, beating McLaughlin and Palou. This also promoted Dixon to second in the championship, six points behind Power.

The last oval race of the season was next up. Power took pole for the Bommarito Automotive Group 500 and once again weather played a part: This time, the race start was brought forward and Power led ahead of Ericsson and Newgarden. Teams were trying to stretch out the stints in expectation of a rain-shortened race. Ericsson dropped back after his first stop, allowing McLaughlin and O'Ward through. Shortly after the second round of stops, a caution came out, with some drivers staying out to gamble on the race being stopped. That stoppage only came on lap 217, though, too late to gain anything from this gamble. The race was restarted over two hours later, McLaughlin leading Newgarden and O'Ward. Malukas restarted in fifth and was flying on fresh tires, quickly dispersing fourth and third. Meanwhile, Newgarden had taken the lead from McLaughlin, who was then overtaken by Malukas for second on the last lap of the race. Newgarden's win moved him just three points behind Power in the championship.

Seven drivers were still in championship contention heading into the penultimate round, and McLaughlin took pole for the Grand Prix of Portland. He was untroubled at the start, while Lundgaard got by Power into second. This order remained until the first pitstops, when Power had a strong outlap and Lundgaard a slight delay in pitlane, so the pair changed positions. On the next round of stops, Lundgaard once again lost out, this time to O'Ward. On their last stop, the leading group remained the same order. A caution was then thrown for Johnson crashing out, and O'Ward tried to pass Power on the restart. This attempt failed, he lost momentum and dropped back behind Dixon, who started 16th, was sixth by the restart and used it to climb into third. Power did not try any aggressive moves on McLaughlin, instead being content to finish behind him in second, thereby extending his championship lead. O'Ward's fourth place and Palou's twelfth place eliminated them from championship contention.

The closest championship fight since 2003 concluded at the Firestone Grand Prix of Monterey. Five drivers were in title contention, and championship leader Power won pole position while his rivals struggled in qualifying. Ilott started second and dropped back at the start, allowing Rossi and O'Ward through. Behind them, Newgarden started 25th and immediately started climbing the ranks. He had started on alternate tires and elected to run long, ending up just behind Power, who had already stopped. Palou, who had pitted on fresh red tires, had the most pace through that stage and soon found himself leading. A caution came out in the second half of the race, bunching the field back up and committing Newgarden to push flatout and then stop once more. He pulled away and ended up second after his final stop, with Power just behind him and Palou in front, who was unstoppable all race and claimed the win and fifth in the standings. Power stayed third, knowing this was enough to secure his second IndyCar championship, while Newgarden's second place secured him the runner-up championship spot.

== Points standings ==
- Ties were broken by number of wins, followed by number of 2nds, 3rds, etc.; then by finishing position in the previous race; then by random draw.

=== Driver standings ===
- At all races except the Indy 500, the pole position qualifier earned 1 point (unless qualifying is not held). The twelve Indy 500 qualifiers who qualified for the fast 12 session received points based on the results of that session, descending from 12 points for first place.
- Drivers who led at least one race lap were awarded 1 point. The driver who led the most laps during a race scored an additional 2 points.
- Entrant-initiated engine change-outs before the engine reached their required distance run resulted in the loss of 10 points.

Pos	Driver	STP	TMS	LBH	BAR	IGP1	INDY	BEL	ROA	MOH	TOR	IOW		IGP2	NSC	GTW	POR	LAG	Pts
1	(Australia) Will Power	3^{L}	4^{L}	4^{L}	4	**3**	15^{11}	1^{L}*	19	3	15	**3**^{L}	**2**^{L}	3^{L}	11	**6**^{L}*	2^{L}	**3**^{L}	560
2	(United States) Josef Newgarden	16	1^{L}	1^{L}*	14^{L}	25	13	**4**^{L}	1^{L}*	7	10	1^{L}*	24^{L}*	5	6^{L}	1^{L}	8	2^{L}	544
3	(New Zealand) Scott Dixon	8^{L}	5	6	5	10	**21**^{1L}*	3^{L}	9	5	1^{L}*	5	4	8	1^{L}	8	3	12	521
4	(New Zealand) Scott McLaughlin	**1**^{L}*	2^{L}*	14	6	20^{L}	29	19	7	1^{L}*	9	22	3	4^{L}	**2**^{L}	3^{L}	**1**^{L}*	6	510
5	(Spain) Álex Palou	2^{L}	7	3^{L}	2^{L}	18	9^{2L}	6^{L}	27	2	6	6	13	10	3^{L}*	9	12	1^{L}*	510
6	(Sweden) Marcus Ericsson	9	3^{L}	22	12	4^{L}	1^{5L}	7	2^{L}	6	5	8	6	11	14	7^{L}	11	9	506
7	(Mexico) Pato O'Ward	12	15	5	1^{L}	19^{L}	2^{7L}	5	26	**24**^{L}	11^{L}	2	1^{L}	12	24	4^{L}	4	8	480
8	(Sweden) Felix Rosenqvist	17	**21**	11	16	6^{L}	4^{8}	10	6^{L}	27	3^{L}	26	7	**9**^{L}	7	16^{L}	10	4^{L}	393
9	(United States) Alexander Rossi	20^{L}	27	8	9	11	5	2	**3**^{L}	19	23	13	18	1*^{L}^{1}	4	25	7	10	381
10	(United States) Colton Herta	4	12	**23**^{L}	10	1^{L}*	30	8	5	15^{L}	**2**^{L}	24	12	24^{L}	5	11	6	11	381
11	(United States) Graham Rahal	7	22	7	8	16	14	26	8	12	4^{L}	9	14	7	23	10^{L}	5^{L}	18	345
12	(Netherlands) Rinus VeeKay	6^{L}	10^{L}	13	**3**^{L}*	23	33^{3L}	16	17	4	13^{L}	4	19	6	12	26	20	14	331
13	(France) Romain Grosjean	5	26	2	7	17	31^{9}	17	4^{L}	21	16	7	9	16	16	13^{L}	19	7	328
14	(Denmark) Christian Lundgaard RY	11	19	18	15	9	18	14	10^{L}	11	8	10	26	2	8	19	21^{L}	5	323
15	(France) Simon Pagenaud	15	8	19	11	2	8	9	12	10	7	23	23	25	9	20	23	17	314
16	(United States) David Malukas R	26	11^{L}	21	20	12	16	11	16	9	12	14	8^{L}	13	20	2^{L}	14	13	305
17	(United States) Conor Daly	21	18	12	19	5	6^{L}	12	14	13	20	19	16	17	17	23	25	24	267
18	(Brazil) Hélio Castroneves	14	23^{L}	9	21	14	7	25	22	8	17	16	21	19	13	15	17	19	263
19	(Japan) Takuma Sato	10	20^{L}	17	13	7	25^{10}	13	15^{L}	14	25	21	10^{L}	15	21	5^{L}	18	23	258
20	(United Kingdom) Callum Ilott R	19	16^{L}	24	25	8	32		11	23	14	12	11	14	15	21	9^{L}	26^{L}	219
21	(United States) Jimmie Johnson	23	6	20	24	22	28^{12L}	22	24	16	21	11^{L}	5	22	18	14	24	16	214
22	(United Kingdom) Jack Harvey	13	Wth	15	18	13	24	15	13	20	19	18	20	20	10	24	15	20	209
23	(Canada) Devlin DeFrancesco R	22	24	25^{L}	17	21	20	18	18	17	18	17	15	18	22	12	16	15	206
24	(United States) Kyle Kirkwood R	18	25^{L}	10	22	26	17	24	20	26	22	15	25	23	19	17	13	21	183
25	(Canada) Dalton Kellett	25	17	26	23	27	27	20	23	22	24	20	22	21	25	18	22	25	133
26	(Brazil) Tony Kanaan						3^{6L}												78
27	(United States) Ed Carpenter		13^{L}				19^{4}					25	17			22			75
28	(United States) Santino Ferrucci		9				10	21											71
29	(Colombia) Tatiana Calderón R	24		16	26	15^{L}		23	25	25									58
30	(United States) J. R. Hildebrand		14^{L}				12												53
31	(Colombia) Juan Pablo Montoya					24	11												44
32	(Switzerland) Simona de Silvestro								21	18					26			22	34
33	(United States) Marco Andretti						22^{L}												17
34	(United States) Sage Karam						23												14
35	(United Kingdom) Stefan Wilson R						26												10
Pos	Driver	STP	TMS	LBH	BAR	IGP1	INDY	BEL	ROA	MOH	TOR	IOW		IGP2	NSC	GTW	POR	LAG	Pts

Color	Result
Gold	Winner
Silver	2nd-place finish
Bronze	3rd-place finish
Green	Top 5 finish
Light Blue	Top 10 finish
Dark Blue	Other flagged position
Purple	Did not finish
Red	Did not qualify (DNQ)
Brown	Withdrew (Wth)
Black	Disqualified (DSQ)
White	Did Not Start (DNS)
White	Race abandoned (C)
Blank	Did not participate

**In-line notation**
**Bold**	Pole position (1 point; except Indy)
Italics	Ran fastest race lap
^{L}	Led race lap (1 point)
*	Led most race laps (2 points)
^{1–12}	Indy 500 "Fast Twelve" bonus points
^{c}	Qualifying canceled (no bonus point)
RY	Rookie of the Year
R	Rookie

- ^{1} Alexander Rossi was penalized 20 points after the Gallagher Grand Prix after his car was found to have been illegally ballasted, in violation of technical regulations.

=== Entrant standings ===
- Each regular season entry that finished in the top 22 the previous season qualified for the Leaders Circle, the IndyCar programme which, among other things, awards each team in it around a $1 million bonus for completing the races providing that car competes in the full season.
- Based on the entrant, used for oval qualifications order, and starting grids when qualifying is cancelled.
- Only full-time entrants or part-time entrants that ran in more than 8 races shown.

Entrant	STP	TMS	LBH	BAR	IGP1	INDY	BEL	ROA	MOH	TOR	IOW		IGP2	NSC	GTW	POR	LAG	Pts
#12 Team Penske	3^{L}	4^{L}	4^{L}	4	**3**	15^{11}	1^{L*}	19	3	15	**3**^{L}	**2**^{L}	3^{L}	11	**6**^{L}*	2^{L}	**3**^{L}	560
#2 Team Penske	16	1^{L}	1^{L}*	14^{L}	25	13	**4**^{L}	1^{L}*	7	10	1^{L}*	24^{L}*	5	6^{L}	1^{L}	8	2^{L}	544
#9 Chip Ganassi Racing	8^{L}	5	6	5	10	**21**^{1L}*	3^{L}	9	5	1^{L*}	5	4	8	1^{L}	8	3	12	521
#3 Team Penske	**1**^{L}*	2^{L}*	14	6	20^{L}	29	19	7	1^{L*}	9	22	3	4^{L}	**2**^{L}	3^{L}	**1**^{L}*	6	510
#10 Chip Ganassi Racing	2^{L}	7	3^{L}	2^{L}	18	9^{2L}	6^{L}	27	2	6	6	13	10	3^{L}*	9	12	1^{L}*	510
#8 Chip Ganassi Racing	9	3^{L}	22	12	4^{L}	1^{5L}	7	2^{L}	6	5	8	6	11	14	7^{L}	11	9	506
#5 Arrow McLaren SP	12	15	5	1^{L}	19^{L}	2^{7L}	5	26	**24^{L}**	11^{L}	2	1^{L}	12	24	4^{L}	4	8	480
#7 Arrow McLaren SP	17	**21**	11	16	6^{L}	4^{8}	10	6^{L}	27	3^{L}	26	7	**9**^{L}	7	16^{L}	10	4^{L}	393
#27 Andretti Autosport	20^{L}	27	8	9	11	5	2	**3**^{L}	19	23	13	18	1^{L}	4	25	7	10	381
#26 Andretti Autosport with Curb-Agajanian	4	12	**23**^{L}	10	1^{L}*	30	8	5	15^{L}	**2^{L}**	24	12	24^{L}	5	11	6	11	381
#15 Rahal Letterman Lanigan Racing	7	22	7	8	16	14	26	8	12	4^{L}	9	14	7	23	10^{L}	5^{L}	18	345
#21 Ed Carpenter Racing	6^{L}	10^{L}	13	**3**^{L}*	23	33^{3L}	16	17	4	13^{L}	4	19	6	12	26	20	14	331
#28 Andretti Autosport	5	26	2	7	17	31^{9}	17	4^{L}	21	16	7	9	16	16	13^{L}	19	7	328
#30 Rahal Letterman Lanigan Racing	11	19	18	15	9	18	14	10^{L}	11	8	10	26	2	8	19	21^{L}	5	323
#60 Meyer Shank Racing	15	8	19	11	2	8	9	12	10	7	23	23	25	9	20	23	17	314
#18 Dale Coyne Racing with HMD Motorsports	26	11^{L}	21	20	12	16	11	16	9	12	14	8^{L}	13	20	2^{L}	14	13	305
#20 Ed Carpenter Racing	21	18	12	19	5	6^{L}	12	14	13	20	19	16	17	17	23	25	24	267
#06 Meyer Shank Racing	14	23^{L}	9	21	14	7	25	22	8	17	16	21	19	13	15	17	19	263
#51 Dale Coyne Racing with Rick Ware Racing	10	20^{L}	17	13	7	25^{10}	13	15^{L}	14	25	21	10^{L}	15	21	5^{L}	18	23	258
#45 Rahal Letterman Lanigan Racing	13	9	15	18	13	24	15	13	20	19	18	20	20	10	24	15	20	231
#77 Juncos Hollinger Racing	19	16^{L}	24	25	8	32	21	11	23	14	12	11	14	15	21	9^{L}	26^{L}	228
#48 Chip Ganassi Racing	23	6	20	24	22	28^{12L}	22	24	16	21	11^{L}	5	22	18	14	24	16	214
#29 Andretti Steinbrenner Autosport	22	24	25^{L}	17	21	20	18	18	17	18	17	15	18	22	12	16	15	206
#14 A. J. Foyt Enterprises	18	25^{L}	10	22	26	17	24	20	26	22	15	25	23	19	17	13	21	183
#4 A. J. Foyt Enterprises	25	17	26	23	27	27	20	23	22	24	20	22	21	25	18	22	25	133
#11 A. J. Foyt Enterprises	24	14^{L}	16	26	15^{L}	12	23	25	25									111
Entrant	STP	TMS	LBH	BAR	IGP1	INDY	BEL	ROA	MOH	TOR	IOW		IGP2	NSC	GTW	POR	LAG	Pts

=== Manufacturer standings ===
- The top two finishing full-season entrants from each manufacturer in each race scored points for their respective manufacturer.
- At all races except the Indy 500, the manufacturer who qualified on pole earned one point. At the Indy 500, the fastest Saturday qualifier earned one point, while the pole position winner on Sunday earned two points.
- The manufacturer that won each race was awarded five additional points.
- Bonus points were awarded for Indy 500 race engines that reached a running duration of 2,000 miles during the season.
- All manufacturer points could only be earned by full-season entrants, and provided they were using an engine from their initial allocation, or had mileaged out all previously used engines. Ineligible cars were removed from the finishing order used for race finish points, and could not score pole or win bonus points.

Pos	Manufacturer	STP	TMS	LBH	BAR	IGP1	INDY	BEL	ROA	MOH	TOR	IOW		IGP2	NSC	GTW	POR	LAG	Bonus	Pts
1	Chevrolet	1	1	1	1	3	2	1	1	1	3	1	1	3	2	1	1	1	75	1510
1	Chevrolet	3	2	4	3	5	3	4	6	3	9	2	2	4	5	3	2	2	75	1510
1	Chevrolet	91^{PW}	96^{PW}	87^{W}	91^{PW}	66^{P}	76^{F}	88^{PW}	83^{W}	91^{PW}	57	96^{PW}	96^{PW}	68^{P}	71^{P}	91^{PW}	96^{PW}	91^{P}	75	1510
2	Honda	2	3	2	2	1	1	2	2	2	1	5	4	1	1	2	3	3	32	1299
2	Honda	4	5	3	5	2	4	3	3	5	2	6	5	2	3	5	5	6	32	1299
2	Honda	72	65	76^{P}	70	95^{W}	89^{PW}	75	76^{P}	70	96^{PW}	58	62	75^{W}	90^{W}	70	65	63	32	1299

Manufacturer standings results breakdown
Entrant	STP	TMS	LBH	BAR	IGP1	INDY	BEL	ROA	MOH	TOR	IOW		IGP2	NSC	GTW	POR	LAG
Chevrolet
#2 Team Penske	16	1	1	14	24^{2}	10^{3}	**4**	1	7	10^{4}	1	22	5	5	1	Ineligible	
#3 Team Penske	**1**	2	14^{2}	6	20	22^{3}	19	7	1	9	22	3	4	**2**^{4}	3	**1**	4
#4 A. J. Foyt Enterprises	25	16	26	23	26^{2}	20^{3}	20	22^{4}	21	24	20	20	21	23	15	Ineligible	
#5 Arrow McLaren SP	12	14	5	1	19	2^{2,3}	5	25	**23**	11	2	1	12	22^{4}	4	4	5
#7 Arrow McLaren SP	17	**20**	11	16	6	3^{2,3}	10	6	26	3	25	7	**9**	6^{4}	13	8	2
#11 A. J. Foyt Enterprises	24	13	16	26	15^{2}	9^{3}	23	24	24	Not entered							
#12 Team Penske	3	4	4	4	**3**^{2}	12^{3}	1	19	3	15	**3**	**2**	3	10^{4}	6	2	**1**
#14 A. J. Foyt Enterprises	18	24	10	22	25^{2}	14^{3}	24	20	25	22	15	23	23^{4}	17	14	11	16
#20 Ed Carpenter Racing	21	17	12	19	5^{2}	5^{3}	12	14	13	20	19	15	17	15^{4}	19	20	18
#21 Ed Carpenter Racing	6	10	13	**3**	23^{2}	26^{3}	16	17	4	13	4	17	6	11	22^{4}	16	10
#77 Juncos Hollinger Racing	19	15	24	25	8^{2}	25^{3}	21	11	22	14	12	11	14	13	18^{4}	7	19
Honda
#06 Meyer Shank Racing	14	22	9^{2}	21	14	6^{3,4}	25	21	8	17	16	19	19	Ineligible			
#8 Chip Ganassi Racing	9	3	22	12	4	1^{2,3}	7	2	6	5	8	6	11^{4}	12	7	9	6
#9 Chip Ganassi Racing	8	5	6	5	10	**17**^{2,3}	3	9	5	1	5	4	8	1^{4}	8	3	8
#10 Chip Ganassi Racing	2	7	3	2	18^{2}	8^{3}	6	26	2	6	6	12	10	3^{4}	9	10	Inel.
#15 Rahal Letterman Lanigan Racing	7	21	7	8	16	11^{2,3}	26	8	12	4	9	13	7	21^{4}	10	5	14
#18 Dale Coyne Racing with HMD Motorsports	26	11	21	20	12	13^{2,3}	11	16	9	12	14	8	13	18^{4}	2	12	9
#26 Andretti Autosport with Curb-Agajanian	4	12	**23**	10	1	23^{2,3,4}	8	5	15	**2**	24	Ineligible					
#27 Andretti Autosport	20	26	8	9^{2}	11	4^{3}	2	3	18	23	13	16	1	4^{4}	21	6	7
#28 Andretti Autosport	5	25	2^{2}	7	17	24^{3,4}	17	4	20	16	7	9	16	14	Ineligible		
#29 Andretti Steinbrenner Autosport	22	23	25^{2}	17	21	16^{3}	18	18	17	18	17	14^{4}	18	20	11	14	11
#30 Rahal Letterman Lanigan Racing	11	18	18	15	9	15^{2,3}	14	10	11	8	10	24	2	7^{4}	16	17	3
#45 Rahal Letterman Lanigan Racing	13	9	15	18	13	18^{2,3}	15	13	19	19	18	18	20	9^{4}	20	13	15
#48 Chip Ganassi Racing	23	6	20	24	22	21^{2,3}	22	23	16	21	11	5	22	16^{4}	12	19	12
#51 Dale Coyne Racing with Rick Ware Racing	10	19	17	13	7	19^{2,3}	13	15	14	25	21	10	15	19^{4}	5	15	17
#60 Meyer Shank Racing	15	8	19	11	2^{2}	7^{3}	9	12	10	7	23	21	24	8^{4}	17	18	13
Superscript indicates entrant engine count

== See also ==
- 2022 Indy Lights
- 2022 Indy Pro 2000 Championship
- 2022 U.S. F2000 National Championship
- 2022 USF Juniors
