= 2022 Grand Prix of Portland =

Indycar race held in Portland, Oregon

(United States) 2022 Grand Prix of Portland
Race details
16th round of the 2022 IndyCar season
← Previous race	Next race →
- Layout of the Portland International Raceway
- Date: September 4, 2022
- Official name: Grand Prix of Portland
- Location: Portland International Raceway, Portland, Oregon
- Course: Permanent racing facility 1.964 mi / 3.161 km
- Distance: 110 laps 216.04 mi / 347.68 km

Pole position
- Driver: (New Zealand) Scott McLaughlin (Team Penske)
- Time: 00:58.2349

Fastest lap
- Driver: (United States) Josef Newgarden (Team Penske)
- Time: 00:59.5874 (on lap 16 of 110)

Podium
- First: (New Zealand) Scott McLaughlin (Team Penske)
- Second: (Australia) Will Power (Team Penske)
- Third: (New Zealand) Scott Dixon (Chip Ganassi Racing)

The 2022 Grand Prix of Portland was the sixteenth And penultimate round of the 2022 IndyCar season and the 400th NTT IndyCar Series event. The race was held on September 4, 2022, in Portland, Oregon at the Portland International Raceway. Scott McLaughlin qualified on pole. To prevent a first lap first corner pileup the drivers agreed to get the green flag further back on the front straight than previous years. This early start was successful in preventing a first lap pileup, and the race went 97 laps without a yellow. McLaughlin led 104 of 110 laps and won the race from pole. Will Power and Scott Dixon rounded out the podium.

== Entry list ==
Key	Meaning
R	Rookie
W	Past winner

No.	Driver	Team	Engine
2	(United States) Josef Newgarden	Team Penske	Chevrolet
3	(New Zealand) Scott McLaughlin	Team Penske	Chevrolet
4	(Canada) Dalton Kellett	A. J. Foyt Enterprises	Chevrolet
5	(Mexico) Patricio O'Ward	Arrow McLaren SP	Chevrolet
06	(Brazil) Hélio Castroneves	Meyer Shank Racing	Honda
7	(Sweden) Felix Rosenqvist	Arrow McLaren SP	Chevrolet
8	(Sweden) Marcus Ericsson	Chip Ganassi Racing	Honda
9	(New Zealand) Scott Dixon	Chip Ganassi Racing	Honda
10	(Spain) Álex Palou W	Chip Ganassi Racing	Honda
12	(Australia) Will Power W	Team Penske	Chevrolet
14	(United States) Kyle Kirkwood R	A. J. Foyt Enterprises	Chevrolet
15	(United States) Graham Rahal	Rahal Letterman Lanigan Racing	Honda
18	(United States) David Malukas R	Dale Coyne Racing with HMD Motorsports	Honda
20	(United States) Conor Daly	Ed Carpenter Racing	Chevrolet
21	(Netherlands) Rinus VeeKay	Ed Carpenter Racing	Chevrolet
26	(United States) Colton Herta	Andretti Autosport	Honda
27	(United States) Alexander Rossi	Andretti Autosport	Honda
28	(France) Romain Grosjean	Andretti Autosport	Honda
29	(Canada) Devlin DeFrancesco R	Andretti Steinbrenner Autosport	Honda
30	(Denmark) Christian Lundgaard R	Rahal Letterman Lanigan Racing	Honda
45	(United Kingdom) Jack Harvey	Rahal Letterman Lanigan Racing	Honda
48	(United States) Jimmie Johnson	Chip Ganassi Racing	Honda
51	(Japan) Takuma Sato W	Dale Coyne Racing with Rick Ware Racing	Honda
60	(France) Simon Pagenaud	Meyer Shank Racing	Honda
77	(United Kingdom) Callum Ilott R	Juncos Hollinger Racing	Chevrolet

== Practice ==
=== Practice 1 ===
Top Practice Speeds
Pos	No.	Driver	Team	Engine	Lap Time
1	2	(United States) Josef Newgarden	Team Penske	Chevrolet	00:58.5769
2	18	(United States) David Malukas R	Dale Coyne Racing with HMD Motorsports	Honda	00:58.7024
3	3	(New Zealand) Scott McLaughlin	Team Penske	Chevrolet	00:58.7156

=== Practice 2 ===
Top Practice Speeds
Pos	No.	Driver	Team	Engine	Lap Time
1	12	(Australia) Will Power W	Team Penske	Chevrolet	00:58.3946
2	2	(United States) Josef Newgarden	Team Penske	Chevrolet	00:58.4083
3	3	(New Zealand) Scott McLaughlin	Team Penske	Chevrolet	00:58.4910

== Qualifying ==
=== Qualifying classification ===
Pos	No.	Driver	Team	Engine	Time				Final grid
Pos	No.	Driver	Team	Engine	Round 1		Round 2	Round 3	Final grid
Pos	No.	Driver	Team	Engine	Group 1	Group 2	Round 2	Round 3	Final grid
1	3	(New Zealand) Scott McLaughlin	Team Penske	Chevrolet	N/A	00:58.0029	00:58.2504	**00:58.2349**	1
2	2	(United States) Josef Newgarden	Team Penske	Chevrolet	**00:58.0433**	N/A	**00:57.9651**	00:58.3129	8 (Note: Josef Newgarden received a six-place grid penalty due to an unapproved engine change.)
3	12	(Australia) Will Power **W**	Team Penske	Chevrolet	N/A	00:57.9266	00:58.0868	00:58.4254	2
4	30	(Denmark) Christian Lundgaard **R**	Rahal Letterman Lanigan Racing	Honda	N/A	**00:57.9218**	00:58.0753	00:58.4482	3
5	10	(Spain) Álex Palou **W**	Chip Ganassi Racing	Honda	N/A	00:58.1497	00:58.3381	00:58.5075	4
6	5	(Mexico) Pato O'Ward	Arrow McLaren SP	Chevrolet	00:58.1408	N/A	00:58.2593	00:58.6090	5
7	7	(Sweden) Felix Rosenqvist	Arrow McLaren SP	Chevrolet	N/A	00:58.1465	00:58.3475	N/A	6
8	26	(United States) Colton Herta	Andretti Autosport with Curb-Agajanian	Honda	00:58.3020	N/A	00:58.3925	N/A	7
9	27	(United States) Alexander Rossi	Andretti Autosport	Honda	00:58.2318	N/A	00:58.3983	N/A	9
10	18	(United States) David Malukas **R**	Dale Coyne Racing with HMD Motorsports	Honda	N/A	00:58.0506	00:58.4038	N/A	10
11	15	(United States) Graham Rahal	Rahal Letterman Lanigan Racing	Honda	00:58.4106	N/A	00:58.4475	N/A	11
12	21	(Netherlands) Rinus VeeKay	Ed Carpenter Racing	Chevrolet	00:58.2292	N/A	00:58.5356	N/A	12
13	14	(United States) Kyle Kirkwood **R**	A. J. Foyt Enterprises	Chevrolet	00:58.4865	N/A	N/A	N/A	13
14	77	(United Kingdom) Callum Ilott **R**	Juncos Hollinger Racing	Chevrolet	N/A	00:58.1988	N/A	N/A	14
15	28	(France) Romain Grosjean	Andretti Autosport	Honda	00:58.5097	N/A	N/A	N/A	15
16	9	(New Zealand) Scott Dixon	Chip Ganassi Racing	Honda	N/A	00:58.2628	N/A	N/A	16
17	45	(United Kingdom) Jack Harvey	Rahal Letterman Lanigan Racing	Honda	00:58.5332	N/A	N/A	N/A	17
18	8	(Sweden) Marcus Ericsson	Chip Ganassi Racing	Honda	N/A	00:58.3064	N/A	N/A	18
19	60	(France) Simon Pagenaud	Meyer Shank Racing	Honda	00:58.6898	N/A	N/A	N/A	19
20	20	(United States) Conor Daly	Ed Carpenter Racing	Chevrolet	N/A	00:58.4398	N/A	N/A	20
21	06	(Brazil) Hélio Castroneves	Meyer Shank Racing	Honda	00:58.7534	N/A	N/A	N/A	21
22	51	(Japan) Takuma Sato **W**	Dale Coyne Racing with Rick Ware Racing	Honda	N/A	00:58.6058	N/A	N/A	22
23	48	(United States) Jimmie Johnson	Chip Ganassi Racing	Honda	00:59.1933	N/A	N/A	N/A	23
24	29	(Canada) Devlin DeFrancesco **R**	Andretti Steinbrenner Autosport	Honda	N/A	00:58.6127	N/A	N/A	24
25	4	(Canada) Dalton Kellett	A. J. Foyt Enterprises	Chevrolet	N/A	00:59.0082	N/A	N/A	25 (Note: Dalton Kellett received a six-place grid penalty due to an unapproved engine change. However, qualifying in last place meant this penalty had no impact.)

Notes

- **Bold text** indicates fastest time set in session.

== Final Practice ==
Top Practice Speeds
Pos	No.	Driver	Team	Engine	Lap Time
1	27	(United States) Alexander Rossi	Andretti Autosport	Honda	00:59.0532
2	30	(Denmark) Christian Lundgaard R	Rahal Letterman Lanigan Racing	Honda	00:59.1806
3	10	(Spain) Álex Palou W	Chip Ganassi Racing	Honda	00:59.2196

== Race ==
The race started at 3:30 PM ET on September 4, 2022.

=== Race classification ===
Pos	No.	Driver	Team	Engine	Laps	Time/Retired	Pit Stops	Grid	Laps Led	Pts.
1	3	(New Zealand) Scott McLaughlin	Team Penske	Chevrolet	110	01:56:15.6892	3	1	104	54
2	12	(Australia) Will Power W	Team Penske	Chevrolet	110	+1.1792	3	2	2	41
3	9	(New Zealand) Scott Dixon	Chip Ganassi Racing	Honda	110	+1.6006	3	16		35
4	5	(Mexico) Pato O'Ward	Arrow McLaren SP	Chevrolet	110	+13.8892	3	5		32
5	15	(United States) Graham Rahal	Rahal Letterman Lanigan Racing	Honda	110	+14.8208	3	11	2	31
6	26	(United States) Colton Herta	Andretti Autosport with Curb-Agajanian	Honda	110	+16.3039	3	7		28
7	27	(United States) Alexander Rossi	Andretti Autosport	Honda	110	+17.0044	3	9		26
8	2	(United States) Josef Newgarden	Team Penske	Chevrolet	110	+17.6062	3	8		24
9	77	(United Kingdom) Callum Ilott R	Juncos Hollinger Racing	Chevrolet	110	+18.0978	3	14	1	23
10	7	(Sweden) Felix Rosenqvist	Arrow McLaren SP	Chevrolet	110	+18.6356	3	6		20
11	8	(Sweden) Marcus Ericsson	Chip Ganassi Racing	Honda	110	+23.5169	3	18		19
12	10	(Spain) Álex Palou W	Chip Ganassi Racing	Honda	110	+27.5282	3	4		18
13	14	(United States) Kyle Kirkwood R	A. J. Foyt Enterprises	Chevrolet	110	+28.3322	3	13		17
14	18	(United States) David Malukas R	Dale Coyne Racing with HMD Motorsports	Honda	110	+29.0288	3	10		16
15	45	(United Kingdom) Jack Harvey	Rahal Letterman Lanigan Racing	Honda	110	+31.2329	3	17		15
16	29	(Canada) Devlin DeFrancesco R	Andretti Steinbrenner Autosport	Honda	110	+32.5754	3	24		14
17	06	(Brazil) Hélio Castroneves	Meyer Shank Racing	Honda	110	+33.8121	3	21		13
18	51	(Japan) Takuma Sato W	Dale Coyne Racing with Rick Ware Racing	Honda	110	+34.0886	3	22		12
19	28	(France) Romain Grosjean	Andretti Autosport	Honda	110	+34.7299	3	15		11
20	21	(Netherlands) Rinus VeeKay	Ed Carpenter Racing	Chevrolet	110	+35.4454	4	12		10
21	30	(Denmark) Christian Lundgaard R	Rahal Letterman Lanigan Racing	Honda	110	+44.5500	4	3	1	10
22	4	(Canada) Dalton Kellett	A. J. Foyt Enterprises	Chevrolet	109	+1 Lap	3	25		8
23	60	(France) Simon Pagenaud	Meyer Shank Racing	Honda	100	+10 Laps	4	19		7
24	48	(United States) Jimmie Johnson	Chip Ganassi Racing	Honda	82	Contact	3	23		6
25	20	(United States) Conor Daly	Ed Carpenter Racing	Chevrolet	67	Pit Fire	2	20		5
Fastest lap: (United States) Josef Newgarden (Team Penske) – 00:59.5874 (lap 16)

Cautions: 1 for 4 laps

Lead Changes: 9

== Championship standings after the race ==
Drivers' Championship standings

	Pos.	Driver	Points
Unchanged	1	(Australia) Will Power	523
Unchanged	2	(United States) Josef Newgarden	503
Unchanged	3	(New Zealand) Scott Dixon	503
Unchanged	4	(Sweden) Marcus Ericsson	484
1	5	(New Zealand) Scott McLaughlin	482

Engine manufacturer standings

	Pos.	Manufacturer	Points
Unchanged	1	Chevrolet	1419
Unchanged	2	Honda	1236

- Note: Only the top five positions are included.

== Footnotes ==
Previous race: 2022 Bommarito Automotive Group 500	IndyCar Series; 2022 season	Next race: 2022 Firestone Grand Prix of Monterey
Previous race: 2021 Grand Prix of Portland	Grand Prix of Portland	Next race: 2023 Grand Prix of Portland
