= 2022 Hy-Vee IndyCar Race Weekend =

Indycar race held in Newton, Iowa

(United States) 2022 Hy-Vee IndyCar Race Weekend
Race details
11th and 12th round of the 2022 IndyCar season
← Previous race	Next race →
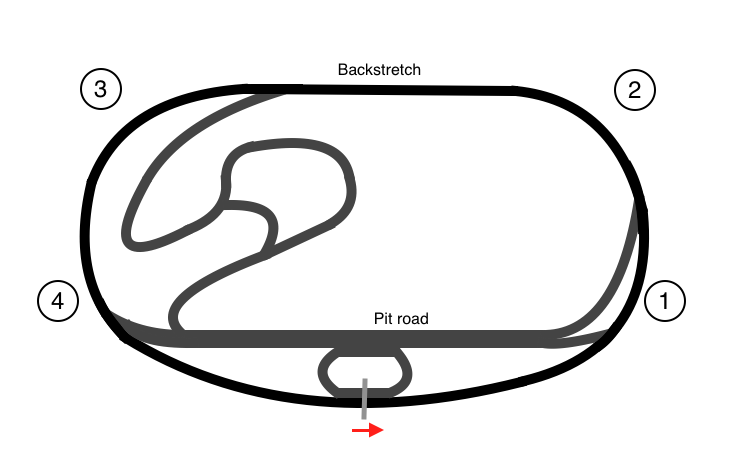
- Date: July 23–24, 2022
- Location: Iowa Speedway
- Course: Permanent racing facility 0.875 mi / 1.408 km
- Distance: 250 and 300 laps 218.75 and 262.5 mi / 352.044 and 422.453 km
Race 1

Pole position
- Driver: (Australia) Will Power (Team Penske)
- Time: 00:18.0607

Fastest lap
- Driver: (Australia) Will Power (Team Penske)
- Time: 00:19.4571 (on lap 2 of 250)

Podium
- First: (United States) Josef Newgarden (Team Penske)
- Second: (Mexico) Patricio O'Ward (Arrow McLaren SP)
- Third: (Australia) Will Power (Team Penske)
Race 2

Pole position
- Driver: (Australia) Will Power (Team Penske)
- Time: 00:18.0796

Fastest lap
- Driver: (Australia) Will Power (Team Penske)
- Time: 00:19.2241 (on lap 134 of 300)

Podium
- First: (Mexico) Patricio O'Ward (Arrow McLaren SP)
- Second: (Australia) Will Power (Team Penske)
- Third: (New Zealand) Scott McLaughlin (Team Penske)

The 2022 Hy-Vee IndyCar Race Weekend was a pair of IndyCar motor races held on July 23, 2022 and July 24, 2022 at Iowa Speedway in Newton, Iowa. They were the 11th and 12th rounds of the 2022 IndyCar season. The race weekend has been held since 2007 with a brief hiatus in 2021 after a change of focus by the owner of the track.

The first race (officially the Hy-VeeDeals.com 250 presented by DoorDash) was held on July 23, 2022. The race consisted of 250 laps and was won by Josef Newgarden.

The second race (officially the Hy-Vee Salute to Farmers 300 presented by Google) was held on July 24, 2022. The race consisted of 300 laps and was won by Patricio O'Ward.

Each race was accompanied with concerts before and after it with Tim McGraw and Florida Georgia Line on Saturday and Gwen Stefani, and Blake Shelton performing on Sunday.

== Race 1 - Hy-VeeDeals.com 250 presented by DoorDash ==
=== Entry list ===
Key	Meaning
R	Rookie
W	Past winner

No.	Driver	Team	Engine
2	(United States) Josef Newgarden W	Team Penske	Chevrolet
3	(New Zealand) Scott McLaughlin	Team Penske	Chevrolet
4	(Canada) Dalton Kellett	A. J. Foyt Enterprises	Chevrolet
5	(Mexico) Patricio O'Ward	Arrow McLaren SP	Chevrolet
06	(Brazil) Hélio Castroneves W	Meyer Shank Racing	Honda
7	(Sweden) Felix Rosenqvist	Arrow McLaren SP	Chevrolet
8	(Sweden) Marcus Ericsson	Chip Ganassi Racing	Honda
9	(New Zealand) Scott Dixon	Chip Ganassi Racing	Honda
10	(Spain) Álex Palou	Chip Ganassi Racing	Honda
12	(Australia) Will Power	Team Penske	Chevrolet
14	(United States) Kyle Kirkwood R	A. J. Foyt Enterprises	Chevrolet
15	(United States) Graham Rahal	Rahal Letterman Lanigan Racing	Honda
18	(United States) David Malukas R	Dale Coyne Racing with HMD Motorsports	Honda
20	(United States) Conor Daly	Ed Carpenter Racing	Chevrolet
21	(Netherlands) Rinus VeeKay	Ed Carpenter Racing	Chevrolet
26	(United States) Colton Herta	Andretti Autosport	Honda
27	(United States) Alexander Rossi	Andretti Autosport	Honda
28	(France) Romain Grosjean	Andretti Autosport	Honda
29	(Canada) Devlin DeFrancesco R	Andretti Steinbrenner Autosport	Honda
30	(Denmark) Christian Lundgaard R	Rahal Letterman Lanigan Racing	Honda
33	(United States) Ed Carpenter	Ed Carpenter Racing	Chevrolet
45	(United Kingdom) Jack Harvey	Rahal Letterman Lanigan Racing	Honda
48	(United States) Jimmie Johnson	Chip Ganassi Racing	Honda
51	(Japan) Takuma Sato	Dale Coyne Racing with Rick Ware Racing	Honda
60	(France) Simon Pagenaud W	Meyer Shank Racing	Honda
77	(United Kingdom) Callum Ilott R	Juncos Hollinger Racing	Chevrolet

=== Practice ===
Top Practice Speeds
Pos	No.	Driver	Team	Engine	Lap Time
1	12	(Australia) Will Power	Team Penske	Chevrolet	00:18.5729
2	20	(United States) Conor Daly	Ed Carpenter Racing	Chevrolet	00:18.5778
3	3	(New Zealand) Scott McLaughlin	Team Penske	Chevrolet	00:18.5946

=== Qualifying ===
Qualifying for Race 1 started at 10:30 AM CT on July 23, 2022. Each entrant turned two consecutive laps, with their first lap time counting towards Race 1 qualifying.

==== Qualifying classification ====
Pos	No.	Driver	Team	Engine	Lap 1	Lap 2	Total Time	Final grid
1	12	(Australia) Will Power	Team Penske	Chevrolet	None	None	00:18.0607	1
2	2	(United States) Josef Newgarden W	Team Penske	Chevrolet	None	None	00:18.1031	2
3	20	(United States) Conor Daly	Ed Carpenter Racing	Chevrolet	None	None	00:18.1341	3
4	5	(Mexico) Pato O'Ward	Arrow McLaren SP	Chevrolet	None	None	00:18.1399	4
5	3	(New Zealand) Scott McLaughlin	Team Penske	Chevrolet	None	None	00:18.1571	5
6	18	(United States) David Malukas R	Dale Coyne Racing with HMD Motorsports	Honda	None	None	00:18.1900	6
7	45	(United Kingdom) Jack Harvey	Rahal Letterman Lanigan Racing	Honda	None	None	00:18.2167	7
8	21	(Netherlands) Rinus VeeKay	Ed Carpenter Racing	Chevrolet	None	None	00:18.2216	8
9	51	(Japan) Takuma Sato	Dale Coyne Racing with Rick Ware Racing	Honda	None	None	00:18.2279	9
10	28	(France) Romain Grosjean	Andretti Autosport	Honda	None	None	00:18.2378	10
11	7	(Sweden) Felix Rosenqvist	Arrow McLaren SP	Chevrolet	None	None	00:18.2595	11
12	8	(Sweden) Marcus Ericsson	Chip Ganassi Racing	Honda	None	None	00:18.3026	12
13	9	(New Zealand) Scott Dixon	Chip Ganassi Racing	Honda	None	None	00:18.3207	13
14	10	(Spain) Álex Palou	Chip Ganassi Racing	Honda	None	None	00:18.3667	14
15	48	(United States) Jimmie Johnson	Chip Ganassi Racing	Honda	None	None	00:18.3693	15
16	15	(United States) Graham Rahal	Rahal Letterman Lanigan Racing	Honda	None	None	00:18.4166	16
17	26	(United States) Colton Herta	Andretti Autosport with Curb-Agajanian	Honda	None	None	00:18.4183	17
18	29	(Canada) Devlin DeFrancesco R	Andretti Steinbrenner Autosport	Honda	None	None	00:18.4254	18
19	27	(United States) Alexander Rossi	Andretti Autosport	Honda	None	None	00:18.4488	19
20	30	(Denmark) Christian Lundgaard R	Rahal Letterman Lanigan Racing	Honda	None	None	00:18.5297	20
21	60	(France) Simon Pagenaud W	Meyer Shank Racing	Honda	None	None	00:18.5581	21
22	77	(United Kingdom) Callum Ilott R	Juncos Hollinger Racing	Chevrolet	None	None	00:18.5588	22
23	33	(United States) Ed Carpenter	Ed Carpenter Racing	Chevrolet	None	None	00:18.5599	23
24	14	(United States) Kyle Kirkwood R	A. J. Foyt Enterprises	Chevrolet	None	None	00:18.6436	24
25	06	(Brazil) Hélio Castroneves W	Meyer Shank Racing	Honda	None	None	00:18.6647	25
26	4	(Canada) Dalton Kellett	A. J. Foyt Enterprises	Chevrolet	None	None	00:18.7049	26

=== Race ===
The race started at 4:06 PM ET on July 23, 2022.

==== Race classification ====
Pos	No.	Driver	Team	Engine	Laps	Time/Retired	Pit Stops	Grid	Laps Led	Pts.
1	2	(United States) Josef Newgarden W	Team Penske	Chevrolet	250	01:39:34.4218	3	2	208	53
2	5	(Mexico) Pato O'Ward	Arrow McLaren SP	Chevrolet	250	+6.1784	3	4		40
3	12	(Australia) Will Power	Team Penske	Chevrolet	250	+20.2822	3	1	23	37
4	21	(Netherlands) Rinus VeeKay	Ed Carpenter Racing	Chevrolet	250	+20.3748	3	8		32
5	9	(New Zealand) Scott Dixon	Chip Ganassi Racing	Honda	250	+21.9744	4	13		30
6	10	(Spain) Álex Palou	Chip Ganassi Racing	Honda	249	+1 Lap	3	14		28
7	28	(France) Romain Grosjean	Andretti Autosport	Honda	249	+1 Lap	3	10		26
8	8	(Sweden) Marcus Ericsson	Chip Ganassi Racing	Honda	249	+1 Lap	3	12		24
9	15	(United States) Graham Rahal	Rahal Letterman Lanigan Racing	Honda	249	+1 Lap	4	16		22
10	30	(Denmark) Christian Lundgaard R	Rahal Letterman Lanigan Racing	Honda	249	+1 Lap	4	20		20
11	48	(United States) Jimmie Johnson	Chip Ganassi Racing	Honda	249	+1 Lap	4	15	19	20
12	77	(United Kingdom) Callum Ilott R	Juncos Hollinger Racing	Chevrolet	249	+1 Lap	4	22		18
13	27	(United States) Alexander Rossi	Andretti Autosport	Honda	249	+1 Lap	3	19		17
14	18	(United States) David Malukas R	Dale Coyne Racing with HMD Motorsports	Honda	249	+1 Lap	3	6		16
15	14	(United States) Kyle Kirkwood R	A. J. Foyt Enterprises	Chevrolet	249	+1 Lap	4	24		15
16	06	(Brazil) Hélio Castroneves W	Meyer Shank Racing	Honda	249	+1 Lap	4	25		14
17	29	(Canada) Devlin DeFrancesco R	Andretti Steinbrenner Autosport	Honda	249	+1 Lap	4	18		13
18	45	(United Kingdom) Jack Harvey	Rahal Letterman Lanigan Racing	Honda	249	+1 Lap	3	7		12
19	20	(United States) Conor Daly	Ed Carpenter Racing	Chevrolet	249	+1 Lap	4	3		11
20	4	(Canada) Dalton Kellett	A. J. Foyt Enterprises	Chevrolet	247	+3 Laps	4	26		10
21	51	(Japan) Takuma Sato	Dale Coyne Racing with Rick Ware Racing	Honda	245	+5 Laps	4	9		9
22	3	(New Zealand) Scott McLaughlin	Team Penske	Chevrolet	244	+6 Laps	5	5		8
23	60	(France) Simon Pagenaud W	Meyer Shank Racing	Honda	244	+6 Laps	5	21		7
24	26	(United States) Colton Herta	Andretti Autosport with Curb-Agajanian	Honda	242	+8 Laps	4	17		6
25	33	(United States) Ed Carpenter	Ed Carpenter Racing	Chevrolet	160	Contact	3	23		5
26	7	(Sweden) Felix Rosenqvist	Arrow McLaren SP	Chevrolet	109	Contact	1	11		5
Fastest lap: (Australia) Will Power (Team Penske) – 00:19.4571 (lap 2)

=== Championship standings after the race ===
Drivers' Championship standings

	Pos.	Driver	Points
Unchanged	1	(Sweden) Marcus Ericsson	375
2	2	(United States) Josef Newgarden	360
1	3	(Australia) Will Power	353
1	4	(Spain) Álex Palou	342
Unchanged	5	(New Zealand) Scott Dixon	337

Engine manufacturer standings

	Pos.	Manufacturer	Points
Unchanged	1	Chevrolet	922
Unchanged	2	Honda	842

- Note: Only the top five positions are included.

== Race 2 - Hy-Vee Salute to Farmers 300 presented by Google ==
=== Entry list ===
The entry list for Race 2 was the same as for Race 1.

Key	Meaning
R	Rookie
W	Past winner

No.	Driver	Team	Engine
2	(United States) Josef Newgarden W	Team Penske	Chevrolet
3	(New Zealand) Scott McLaughlin	Team Penske	Chevrolet
4	(Canada) Dalton Kellett	A. J. Foyt Enterprises	Chevrolet
5	(Mexico) Patricio O'Ward	Arrow McLaren SP	Chevrolet
06	(Brazil) Hélio Castroneves W	Meyer Shank Racing	Honda
7	(Sweden) Felix Rosenqvist	Arrow McLaren SP	Chevrolet
8	(Sweden) Marcus Ericsson	Chip Ganassi Racing	Honda
9	(New Zealand) Scott Dixon	Chip Ganassi Racing	Honda
10	(Spain) Álex Palou	Chip Ganassi Racing	Honda
12	(Australia) Will Power	Team Penske	Chevrolet
14	(United States) Kyle Kirkwood R	A. J. Foyt Enterprises	Chevrolet
15	(United States) Graham Rahal	Rahal Letterman Lanigan Racing	Honda
18	(United States) David Malukas R	Dale Coyne Racing with HMD Motorsports	Honda
20	(United States) Conor Daly	Ed Carpenter Racing	Chevrolet
21	(Netherlands) Rinus VeeKay	Ed Carpenter Racing	Chevrolet
26	(United States) Colton Herta	Andretti Autosport	Honda
27	(United States) Alexander Rossi	Andretti Autosport	Honda
28	(France) Romain Grosjean	Andretti Autosport	Honda
29	(Canada) Devlin DeFrancesco R	Andretti Steinbrenner Autosport	Honda
30	(Denmark) Christian Lundgaard R	Rahal Letterman Lanigan Racing	Honda
33	(United States) Ed Carpenter	Ed Carpenter Racing	Chevrolet
45	(United Kingdom) Jack Harvey	Rahal Letterman Lanigan Racing	Honda
48	(United States) Jimmie Johnson	Chip Ganassi Racing	Honda
51	(Japan) Takuma Sato	Dale Coyne Racing with Rick Ware Racing	Honda
60	(France) Simon Pagenaud W	Meyer Shank Racing	Honda
77	(United Kingdom) Callum Ilott R	Juncos Hollinger Racing	Chevrolet

=== Qualifying ===
Qualifying for Race 2 started at 10:30 AM CT on July 23, 2022. Each entrant turned two consecutive laps, with their second lap time counting towards Race 2 qualifying.

==== Qualifying classification ====
Pos	No.	Driver	Team	Engine	Lap 1	Lap 2	Total Time	Final grid
1	12	(Australia) Will Power	Team Penske	Chevrolet	None	None	00:18.0796	1
2	2	(United States) Josef Newgarden W	Team Penske	Chevrolet	None	None	00:18.0907	2
3	26	(United States) Colton Herta	Andretti Autosport with Curb-Agajanian	Honda	None	None	00:18.1293	12 (Note: Colton Herta received a nine-place grid penalty due to an unapproved engine change.)
4	20	(United States) Conor Daly	Ed Carpenter Racing	Chevrolet	None	None	00:18.1536	3
5	51	(Japan) Takuma Sato	Dale Coyne Racing with Rick Ware Racing	Honda	None	None	00:18.1545	4
6	3	(New Zealand) Scott McLaughlin	Team Penske	Chevrolet	None	None	00:18.1550	5
7	45	(United Kingdom) Jack Harvey	Rahal Letterman Lanigan Racing	Honda	None	None	00:18.1939	6
8	5	(Mexico) Pato O'Ward	Arrow McLaren SP	Chevrolet	None	None	00:18.2214	7
9	21	(Netherlands) Rinus VeeKay	Ed Carpenter Racing	Chevrolet	None	None	00:18.2217	8
10	7	(Sweden) Felix Rosenqvist	Arrow McLaren SP	Chevrolet	None	None	00:18.2464	9
11	28	(France) Romain Grosjean	Andretti Autosport	Honda	None	None	00:18.2550	10
12	10	(Spain) Álex Palou	Chip Ganassi Racing	Honda	None	None	00:18.2737	11
13	48	(United States) Jimmie Johnson	Chip Ganassi Racing	Honda	None	None	00:18.3059	13
14	18	(United States) David Malukas R	Dale Coyne Racing with HMD Motorsports	Honda	None	None	00:18.3498	14
15	8	(Sweden) Marcus Ericsson	Chip Ganassi Racing	Honda	None	None	00:18.3802	15
16	60	(France) Simon Pagenaud W	Meyer Shank Racing	Honda	None	None	00:18.4469	16
17	30	(Denmark) Christian Lundgaard R	Rahal Letterman Lanigan Racing	Honda	None	None	00:18.4495	17
18	9	(New Zealand) Scott Dixon	Chip Ganassi Racing	Honda	None	None	00:18.4514	18
19	33	(United States) Ed Carpenter	Ed Carpenter Racing	Chevrolet	None	None	00:18.4738	19
20	14	(United States) Kyle Kirkwood R	A. J. Foyt Enterprises	Chevrolet	None	None	00:18.5111	20
21	27	(United States) Alexander Rossi	Andretti Autosport	Honda	None	None	00:18.5224	21
22	77	(United Kingdom) Callum Ilott R	Juncos Hollinger Racing	Chevrolet	None	None	00:18.5289	22
23	15	(United States) Graham Rahal	Rahal Letterman Lanigan Racing	Honda	None	None	00:18.5378	23
24	06	(Brazil) Hélio Castroneves W	Meyer Shank Racing	Honda	None	None	00:18.5881	24
25	29	(Canada) Devlin DeFrancesco R	Andretti Steinbrenner Autosport	Honda	None	None	00:18.6035	25
26	4	(Canada) Dalton Kellett	A. J. Foyt Enterprises	Chevrolet	None	None	00:18.6449	26

=== Race ===
The race started at 3:30 PM ET on July 24, 2022.

==== Race classification ====
Pos	No.	Driver	Team	Engine	Laps	Time/Retired	Pit Stops	Grid	Laps Led	Pts.
1	5	(Mexico) Pato O'Ward	Arrow McLaren SP	Chevrolet	300	01:54:23.2097	4	7	66	51
2	12	(Australia) Will Power	Team Penske	Chevrolet	300	+4.2476	4	1	80	42
3	3	(New Zealand) Scott McLaughlin	Team Penske	Chevrolet	300	+9.4464	4	5		35
4	9	(New Zealand) Scott Dixon	Chip Ganassi Racing	Honda	300	+11.1499	4	18		32
5	48	(United States) Jimmie Johnson	Chip Ganassi Racing	Honda	300	+12.3251	4	13		30
6	8	(Sweden) Marcus Ericsson	Chip Ganassi Racing	Honda	300	+14.2340	4	15		28
7	7	(Sweden) Felix Rosenqvist	Arrow McLaren SP	Chevrolet	300	+17.6887	4	9		26
8	18	(United States) David Malukas R	Dale Coyne Racing with HMD Motorsports	Honda	300	+18.3725	4	14	1	25
9	28	(France) Romain Grosjean	Andretti Autosport	Honda	300	+19.5576	4	10		22
10	51	(Japan) Takuma Sato	Dale Coyne Racing with Rick Ware Racing	Honda	300	+20.7325	4	4	5	21
11	77	(United Kingdom) Callum Ilott R	Juncos Hollinger Racing	Chevrolet	300	+21.4930	4	22		19
12	26	(United States) Colton Herta	Andretti Autosport with Curb-Agajanian	Honda	299	+1 Lap	4	12		18
13	10	(Spain) Álex Palou	Chip Ganassi Racing	Honda	299	+1 Lap	4	11		17
14	15	(United States) Graham Rahal	Rahal Letterman Lanigan Racing	Honda	299	+1 Lap	4	23		16
15	29	(Canada) Devlin DeFrancesco R	Andretti Steinbrenner Autosport	Honda	298	+2 Laps	4	25		15
16	20	(United States) Conor Daly	Ed Carpenter Racing	Chevrolet	298	+2 Laps	4	3		14
17	33	(United States) Ed Carpenter	Ed Carpenter Racing	Chevrolet	297	+3 Laps	6	19		13
18	27	(United States) Alexander Rossi	Andretti Autosport	Honda	296	+4 Laps	5	21		12
19	21	(Netherlands) Rinus VeeKay	Ed Carpenter Racing	Chevrolet	296	+4 Laps	5	8		11
20	45	(United Kingdom) Jack Harvey	Rahal Letterman Lanigan Racing	Honda	296	+4 Laps	4	6		10
21	06	(Brazil) Hélio Castroneves W	Meyer Shank Racing	Honda	295	+5 Laps	6	24		9
22	4	(Canada) Dalton Kellett	A. J. Foyt Enterprises	Chevrolet	294	+6 Laps	5	26		8
23	60	(France) Simon Pagenaud W	Meyer Shank Racing	Honda	281	+19 Laps	6	16		7
24	2	(United States) Josef Newgarden W	Team Penske	Chevrolet	235	Accident	3	2	148	9
25	14	(United States) Kyle Kirkwood R	A. J. Foyt Enterprises	Chevrolet	117	Contact	1	20		5
26	30	(Denmark) Christian Lundgaard R	Rahal Letterman Lanigan Racing	Honda	112	Brakes	1	17		5
Fastest lap: (Australia) Will Power (Team Penske) – 00:19.2241 (lap 134)

=== Championship standings after the race ===
Drivers' Championship standings

	Pos.	Driver	Points
Unchanged	1	(Sweden) Marcus Ericsson	403
1	2	(Australia) Will Power	395
1	3	(United States) Josef Newgarden	369
1	4	(New Zealand) Scott Dixon	369
1	5	(Mexico) Pato O'Ward	367

Engine manufacturer standings

	Pos.	Manufacturer	Points
Unchanged	1	Chevrolet	1018
Unchanged	2	Honda	904

- Note: Only the top five positions are included.

== Footnotes ==
Previous race: 2022 Honda Indy Toronto	IndyCar Series; 2022 season	Next race: 2022 Gallagher Grand Prix
Previous race: 2020 Iowa IndyCar 250s	Hy-Vee IndyCar Race Weekend	Next race: 2023 Hy-Vee IndyCar Race Weekend
