= 2022 Bommarito Automotive Group 500 =

Indycar race held in Madison, Illinois

(United States) 2022 Bommarito Automotive Group 500
Race details
15th round of the 2022 IndyCar season
← Previous race	Next race →
- Layout of the World Wide Technology Raceway
- Date: August 20, 2022
- Official name: Bommarito Automotive Group 500
- Location: World Wide Technology Raceway, Madison, Illinois
- Course: Permanent racing facility 1.25 mi / 2.01 km
- Distance: 260 laps 325 mi / 523 km

Pole position
- Driver: (Australia) Will Power (Team Penske)
- Time: 00:49.2539 (total time from 2 laps)

Fastest lap
- Driver: (United States) Josef Newgarden (Team Penske)
- Time: 00:25.5579 (on lap 227 of 260)

Podium
- First: (United States) Josef Newgarden (Team Penske)
- Second: (United States) David Malukas (Dale Coyne Racing with HMD Motorsports)
- Third: (New Zealand) Scott McLaughlin (Team Penske)

The 2022 Bommarito Automotive Group 500 was the fifteenth round of the 2022 IndyCar season. The race was held on August 20, 2022, in Madison, Illinois at the World Wide Technology Raceway. The race consisted of 260 laps and was won by Josef Newgarden.

== Entry list ==
Key	Meaning
R	Rookie
W	Past winner

No.	Driver	Team	Engine
2	(United States) Josef Newgarden W	Team Penske	Chevrolet
3	(New Zealand) Scott McLaughlin	Team Penske	Chevrolet
4	(Canada) Dalton Kellett	A. J. Foyt Enterprises	Chevrolet
5	(Mexico) Patricio O'Ward	Arrow McLaren SP	Chevrolet
06	(Brazil) Hélio Castroneves W	Meyer Shank Racing	Honda
7	(Sweden) Felix Rosenqvist	Arrow McLaren SP	Chevrolet
8	(Sweden) Marcus Ericsson	Chip Ganassi Racing	Honda
9	(New Zealand) Scott Dixon W	Chip Ganassi Racing	Honda
10	(Spain) Álex Palou	Chip Ganassi Racing	Honda
12	(Australia) Will Power W	Team Penske	Chevrolet
14	(United States) Kyle Kirkwood R	A. J. Foyt Enterprises	Chevrolet
15	(United States) Graham Rahal	Rahal Letterman Lanigan Racing	Honda
18	(United States) David Malukas R	Dale Coyne Racing with HMD Motorsports	Honda
20	(United States) Conor Daly	Ed Carpenter Racing	Chevrolet
21	(Netherlands) Rinus VeeKay	Ed Carpenter Racing	Chevrolet
26	(United States) Colton Herta	Andretti Autosport	Honda
27	(United States) Alexander Rossi	Andretti Autosport	Honda
28	(France) Romain Grosjean	Andretti Autosport	Honda
29	(Canada) Devlin DeFrancesco R	Andretti Steinbrenner Autosport	Honda
30	(Denmark) Christian Lundgaard R	Rahal Letterman Lanigan Racing	Honda
33	(United States) Ed Carpenter	Ed Carpenter Racing	Chevrolet
45	(United Kingdom) Jack Harvey	Rahal Letterman Lanigan Racing	Honda
48	(United States) Jimmie Johnson	Chip Ganassi Racing	Honda
51	(Japan) Takuma Sato W	Dale Coyne Racing with Rick Ware Racing	Honda
60	(France) Simon Pagenaud	Meyer Shank Racing	Honda
77	(United Kingdom) Callum Ilott R	Juncos Hollinger Racing	Chevrolet

== Practice ==
=== Practice 1 ===
Top Practice Speeds
Pos	No.	Driver	Team	Engine	Lap Time
1	12	(Australia) Will Power W	Team Penske	Chevrolet	00:24.9254
2	10	(Spain) Álex Palou	Chip Ganassi Racing	Honda	00:24.9712
3	7	(Sweden) Felix Rosenqvist	Arrow McLaren SP	Chevrolet	00:24.9910

== Qualifying ==
=== Qualifying classification ===
Pos	No.	Driver	Team	Engine	Lap 1	Lap 2	Total Time	Final grid
1	12	(Australia) Will Power **W**	Team Penske	Chevrolet	24.6757	24.5782	00:49.2539	1
2	8	(Sweden) Marcus Ericsson	Chip Ganassi Racing	Honda	24.7387	24.6929	00:49.4316	2
3	2	(United States) Josef Newgarden **W**	Team Penske	Chevrolet	24.8967	24.6548	00:49.5515	3
4	3	(New Zealand) Scott McLaughlin	Team Penske	Chevrolet	24.8303	24.7823	00:49.6126	4
5	10	(Spain) Álex Palou	Chip Ganassi Racing	Honda	24.8321	24.8125	00:49.6446	5
6	9	(New Zealand) Scott Dixon **W**	Chip Ganassi Racing	Honda	24.8681	24.8683	00:49.7364	6
7	5	(Mexico) Pato O'Ward	Arrow McLaren SP	Chevrolet	25.0059	24.9101	00:49.9160	7
8	51	(Japan) Takuma Sato **W**	Dale Coyne Racing with Rick Ware Racing	Honda	24.9341	25.0525	00:49.9866	8
9	28	(France) Romain Grosjean	Andretti Autosport	Honda	24.9972	25.0237	00:50.0209	18 (Note: Romain Grosjean received a nine-place grid penalty due to an unapproved engine change.)
10	29	(Canada) Devlin DeFrancesco **R**	Andretti Steinbrenner Autosport	Honda	25.0201	25.1104	00:50.1305	9
11	27	(United States) Alexander Rossi	Andretti Autosport	Honda	25.1104	25.0513	00:50.1617	10
12	26	(United States) Colton Herta	Andretti Autosport with Curb-Agajanian	Honda	25.0346	25.1474	00:50.1820	11
13	18	(United States) David Malukas **R**	Dale Coyne Racing with HMD Motorsports	Honda	25.1646	25.0701	00:50.2347	12
14	60	(France) Simon Pagenaud	Meyer Shank Racing	Honda	25.1603	25.1815	00:50.3418	13
15	45	(United Kingdom) Jack Harvey	Rahal Letterman Lanigan Racing	Honda	25.1626	25.1800	00:50.3426	14
16	20	(United States) Conor Daly	Ed Carpenter Racing	Chevrolet	25.1575	25.2135	00:50.3710	15
17	15	(United States) Graham Rahal	Rahal Letterman Lanigan Racing	Honda	25.2192	25.1568	00:50.3760	16
18	06	(Brazil) Hélio Castroneves **W**	Meyer Shank Racing	Honda	25.2793	25.1815	00:50.4608	17
19	30	(Denmark) Christian Lundgaard **R**	Rahal Letterman Lanigan Racing	Honda	25.3216	25.1935	00:50.5151	19
20	14	(United States) Kyle Kirkwood **R**	A. J. Foyt Enterprises	Chevrolet	25.3211	25.2184	00:50.5395	20
21	48	(United States) Jimmie Johnson	Chip Ganassi Racing	Honda	25.5457	25.4839	00:51.0296	21
22	77	(United Kingdom) Callum Ilott **R**	Juncos Hollinger Racing	Chevrolet	25.5697	25.5132	00:51.0829	22
23	21	(Netherlands) Rinus VeeKay	Ed Carpenter Racing	Chevrolet	25.5858	25.5491	00:51.1349	23
24	4	(Canada) Dalton Kellett	A. J. Foyt Enterprises	Chevrolet	25.9029	25.8503	00:51.7532	24
25	33	(United States) Ed Carpenter	Ed Carpenter Racing	Chevrolet	25.9511	25.8721	00:51.8232	25
26	7	(Sweden) Felix Rosenqvist	Arrow McLaren SP	Chevrolet	None	None	No Time	26

Notes

- **Bold text** indicates fastest time set in session.

== Final practice ==
Top Practice Speeds
Pos	No.	Driver	Team	Engine	Lap Time
1	15	(United States) Graham Rahal	Rahal Letterman Lanigan Racing	Honda	00:25.3196
2	9	(New Zealand) Scott Dixon W	Chip Ganassi Racing	Honda	00:25.3580
3	18	(United States) David Malukas R	Dale Coyne Racing with HMD Motorsports	Honda	00:25.4634

== Race ==
The race was originally scheduled to start at 6:30PM ET on August 20, 2022, however officials elected to move the start time to 6:01 PM ET in anticipation of adverse weather conditions due to arrive later in the evening.

The race was red-flagged at 7:55PM ET on lap 217 due to rain falling on the circuit. The red flag remained until the track had dried out enough for racing to resume, which happened over two hours later at 10:09PM ET.

=== Race classification ===
Pos	No.	Driver	Team	Engine	Laps	Time/Retired	Pit Stops	Grid	Laps Led	Pts.
1	2	(United States) Josef Newgarden W	Team Penske	Chevrolet	260	02:10:40.1827	5	3	78	51
2	18	(United States) David Malukas R	Dale Coyne Racing with HMD Motorsports	Honda	260	+0.4708	5	12	4	41
3	3	(New Zealand) Scott McLaughlin	Team Penske	Chevrolet	260	+1.5254	5	4	12	36
4	5	(Mexico) Pato O'Ward	Arrow McLaren SP	Chevrolet	260	+5.2079	4	7	10	33
5	51	(Japan) Takuma Sato W	Dale Coyne Racing with Rick Ware Racing	Honda	260	+5.5365	5	8	22	31
6	12	(Australia) Will Power W	Team Penske	Chevrolet	260	+11.8662	4	1	128	32
7	8	(Sweden) Marcus Ericsson	Chip Ganassi Racing	Honda	260	+12.6189	5	2	1	27
8	9	(New Zealand) Scott Dixon W	Chip Ganassi Racing	Honda	260	+15.8852	5	6		24
9	10	(Spain) Álex Palou	Chip Ganassi Racing	Honda	260	+21.8239	5	5		22
10	15	(United States) Graham Rahal	Rahal Letterman Lanigan Racing	Honda	260	+26.1005	5	16	2	21
11	26	(United States) Colton Herta	Andretti Autosport with Curb-Agajanian	Honda	259	+1 Lap	5	11		19
12	29	(Canada) Devlin DeFrancesco R	Andretti Steinbrenner Autosport	Honda	259	+1 Lap	4	9		18
13	28	(France) Romain Grosjean	Andretti Autosport	Honda	259	+1 Lap	4	18	2	18
14	48	(United States) Jimmie Johnson	Chip Ganassi Racing	Honda	259	+1 Lap	5	21		16
15	06	(Brazil) Hélio Castroneves W	Meyer Shank Racing	Honda	259	+1 Lap	5	17		15
16	7	(Sweden) Felix Rosenqvist	Arrow McLaren SP	Chevrolet	259	+1 Lap	5	26	1	15
17	14	(United States) Kyle Kirkwood R	A. J. Foyt Enterprises	Chevrolet	258	+2 Laps	5	20		13
18	4	(Canada) Dalton Kellett	A. J. Foyt Enterprises	Chevrolet	258	+2 Laps	5	24		12
19	30	(Denmark) Christian Lundgaard R	Rahal Letterman Lanigan Racing	Honda	258	+2 Laps	5	19		11
20	60	(France) Simon Pagenaud	Meyer Shank Racing	Honda	257	+3 Laps	6	13		10
21	77	(United Kingdom) Callum Ilott R	Juncos Hollinger Racing	Chevrolet	257	+3 Laps	6	22		9
22	33	(United States) Ed Carpenter	Ed Carpenter Racing	Chevrolet	256	+4 Laps	5	25		8
23	20	(United States) Conor Daly	Ed Carpenter Racing	Chevrolet	244	+16 Laps	6	15		7
24	45	(United Kingdom) Jack Harvey	Rahal Letterman Lanigan Racing	Honda	239	+21 Laps	6	14		6
25	27	(United States) Alexander Rossi	Andretti Autosport	Honda	226	+34 Laps	5	10		5
26	21	(Netherlands) Rinus VeeKay	Ed Carpenter Racing	Chevrolet	53	Electrics	1	23		5
Fastest lap: (United States) Josef Newgarden (Team Penske) – 00:25.5579 (lap 227)

== Championship standings after the race ==
Drivers' Championship standings

	Pos.	Driver	Points
Unchanged	1	(Australia) Will Power	482
2	2	(United States) Josef Newgarden	479
1	3	(New Zealand) Scott Dixon	468
1	4	(Sweden) Marcus Ericsson	465
Unchanged	5	(Spain) Álex Palou	439

Engine manufacturer standings

	Pos.	Manufacturer	Points
Unchanged	1	Chevrolet	1323
Unchanged	2	Honda	1171

- Note: Only the top five positions are included.

== Footnotes ==
Previous race: 2022 Big Machine Music City Grand Prix	IndyCar Series; 2022 season	Next race: 2022 Grand Prix of Portland
Previous race: 2021 Bommarito Automotive Group 500	Bommarito Automotive Group 500	Next race: 2023 Bommarito Automotive Group 500
