= 2022 Honda Indy Toronto =

Indycar race held in Toronto, Ontario

(Canada) 2022 Honda Indy Toronto
Race details
10th round of the 2022 IndyCar season
← Previous race	Next race →
- Date: July 17, 2022
- Official name: Honda Indy Toronto
- Location: Exhibition Place, Toronto, Ontario, Canada
- Course: Temporary road course 1.786 mi / 2.874 km
- Distance: 85 laps 151.81 mi / 244.314 km

Pole position
- Driver: (United States) Colton Herta (Andretti Autosport with Curb-Agajanian)
- Time: 00:59.2698

Fastest lap
- Driver: (United States) David Malukas (Dale Coyne Racing with HMD Motorsports)
- Time: 1:00.8307 (on lap 15 of 85)

Podium
- First: (New Zealand) Scott Dixon (Chip Ganassi Racing)
- Second: (United States) Colton Herta (Andretti Autosport with Curb-Agajanian)
- Third: (Sweden) Felix Rosenqvist (Arrow McLaren SP)

The 2022 Honda Indy Toronto was the tenth round of the 2022 IndyCar season. The race was held on July 17, 2022, in Toronto, Ontario, Canada at the Exhibition Place circuit. The race consisted of 85 laps and was won by Scott Dixon.

== Entry list ==
Key	Meaning
R	Rookie
W	Past winner

No.	Driver	Team	Engine
2	(United States) Josef Newgarden W	Team Penske	Chevrolet
3	(New Zealand) Scott McLaughlin	Team Penske	Chevrolet
4	(Canada) Dalton Kellett	A. J. Foyt Enterprises	Chevrolet
5	(Mexico) Patricio O'Ward	Arrow McLaren SP	Chevrolet
06	(Brazil) Hélio Castroneves	Meyer Shank Racing	Honda
7	(Sweden) Felix Rosenqvist	Arrow McLaren SP	Chevrolet
8	(Sweden) Marcus Ericsson	Chip Ganassi Racing	Honda
9	(New Zealand) Scott Dixon W	Chip Ganassi Racing	Honda
10	(Spain) Álex Palou	Chip Ganassi Racing	Honda
12	(Australia) Will Power W	Team Penske	Chevrolet
14	(United States) Kyle Kirkwood R	A. J. Foyt Enterprises	Chevrolet
15	(United States) Graham Rahal	Rahal Letterman Lanigan Racing	Honda
18	(United States) David Malukas R	Dale Coyne Racing with HMD Motorsports	Honda
20	(United States) Conor Daly	Ed Carpenter Racing	Chevrolet
21	(Netherlands) Rinus VeeKay	Ed Carpenter Racing	Chevrolet
26	(United States) Colton Herta	Andretti Autosport	Honda
27	(United States) Alexander Rossi	Andretti Autosport	Honda
28	(France) Romain Grosjean	Andretti Autosport	Honda
29	(Canada) Devlin DeFrancesco R	Andretti Steinbrenner Autosport	Honda
30	(Denmark) Christian Lundgaard R	Rahal Letterman Lanigan Racing	Honda
45	(United Kingdom) Jack Harvey	Rahal Letterman Lanigan Racing	Honda
48	(United States) Jimmie Johnson	Chip Ganassi Racing	Honda
51	(Japan) Takuma Sato	Dale Coyne Racing with Rick Ware Racing	Honda
60	(France) Simon Pagenaud W	Meyer Shank Racing	Honda
77	(United Kingdom) Callum Ilott R	Juncos Hollinger Racing	Chevrolet

== Practice ==
=== Practice 1 ===
Top Practice Speeds
Pos	No.	Driver	Team	Engine	Lap Time
1	27	(United States) Alexander Rossi	Andretti Autosport	Honda	01:00.6090
2	60	(France) Simon Pagenaud W	Meyer Shank Racing	Honda	01:00.6991
3	15	(United States) Graham Rahal	Rahal Letterman Lanigan Racing	Honda	01:00.7031

=== Practice 2 ===
Top Practice Speeds
Pos	No.	Driver	Team	Engine	Lap Time
1	26	(United States) Colton Herta	Andretti Autosport with Curb-Agajanian	Honda	01:00.0471
2	8	(Sweden) Marcus Ericsson	Chip Ganassi Racing	Honda	01:00.2082
3	12	(Australia) Will Power W	Team Penske	Chevrolet	01:00.3322

== Qualifying ==
=== Qualifying classification ===
Pos	No.	Driver	Team	Engine	Time				Final grid
Pos	No.	Driver	Team	Engine	Round 1		Round 2	Round 3	Final grid
Pos	No.	Driver	Team	Engine	Group 1	Group 2	Round 2	Round 3	Final grid
1	26	(United States) Colton Herta	Andretti Autosport with Curb-Agajanian	Honda	N/A	**01:00.0681**	00:59.5391	**00:59.2698**	1
2	9	(New Zealand) Scott Dixon **W**	Chip Ganassi Racing	Honda	00:59.6996	N/A	00:59.5348	00:59.3592	2
3	2	(United States) Josef Newgarden **W**	Team Penske	Chevrolet	N/A	01:00.1584	00:59.4614	00:59.5257	3
4	27	(United States) Alexander Rossi	Andretti Autosport	Honda	00:59.7724	N/A	**00:59.3709**	00:59.5544	4
5	18	(United States) David Malukas **R**	Dale Coyne Racing with HMD Motorsports	Honda	00:59.8686	N/A	00:59.4638	00:59.6140	5
6	3	(New Zealand) Scott McLaughlin	Team Penske	Chevrolet	00:59.9217	N/A	00:59.5876	00:59.9558	6
7	77	(United Kingdom) Callum Ilott **R**	Juncos Hollinger Racing	Chevrolet	00:59.8315	N/A	00:59.6352	N/A	7
8	7	(Sweden) Felix Rosenqvist	Arrow McLaren SP	Chevrolet	N/A	01:00.3655	00:59.6630	N/A	8
9	8	(Sweden) Marcus Ericsson	Chip Ganassi Racing	Honda	**00:59.6875**	N/A	00:59.8527	N/A	9
10	30	(Denmark) Christian Lundgaard **R**	Rahal Letterman Lanigan Racing	Honda	N/A	01:00.5856	00:59.9151	N/A	10
11	28	(France) Romain Grosjean	Andretti Autosport	Honda	N/A	01:00.2755	01:00.0819	N/A	11
12	29	(Canada) Devlin DeFrancesco **R**	Andretti Steinbrenner Autosport	Honda	N/A	01:00.1543	01:14.8882	N/A	12
13	45	(United Kingdom) Jack Harvey	Rahal Letterman Lanigan Racing	Honda	01:00.0212	N/A	N/A	N/A	13
14	15	(United States) Graham Rahal	Rahal Letterman Lanigan Racing	Honda	N/A	01:00.6805	N/A	N/A	14
15	5	(Mexico) Pato O'Ward	Arrow McLaren SP	Chevrolet	01:00.1193	N/A	N/A	N/A	15
16	12	(Australia) Will Power **W**	Team Penske	Chevrolet	N/A	01:00.7974	N/A	N/A	16
17	06	(Brazil) Hélio Castroneves	Meyer Shank Racing	Honda	01:00.2712	N/A	N/A	N/A	17
18	60	(France) Simon Pagenaud **W**	Meyer Shank Racing	Honda	N/A	01:00.7974	N/A	N/A	18
19	51	(Japan) Takuma Sato	Dale Coyne Racing with Rick Ware Racing	Honda	01:00.5324	N/A	N/A	N/A	19
20	21	(Netherlands) Rinus VeeKay	Ed Carpenter Racing	Chevrolet	N/A	01:01.0870	N/A	N/A	20
21	48	(United States) Jimmie Johnson	Chip Ganassi Racing	Honda	01:00.9817	N/A	N/A	N/A	21
22	10	(Spain) Álex Palou	Chip Ganassi Racing	Honda	N/A	01:03.0514	N/A	N/A	22
23	4	(Canada) Dalton Kellett	A. J. Foyt Enterprises	Chevrolet	No Time	N/A	N/A	N/A	23
24	14	(United States) Kyle Kirkwood **R**	A. J. Foyt Enterprises	Chevrolet	N/A	01:03.2511	N/A	N/A	24
25	20	(United States) Conor Daly	Ed Carpenter Racing	Chevrolet	N/A	01:05.2593	N/A	N/A	25

Notes

- **Bold text** indicates fastest time set in session.

== Warmup ==
Top Warmup Speeds
Pos	No.	Driver	Team	Engine	Lap Time
1	21	(Netherlands) Rinus VeeKay	Ed Carpenter Racing	Chevrolet	00:59.8987
2	27	(United States) Alexander Rossi	Andretti Autosport	Honda	00:59.9439
3	10	(Spain) Álex Palou	Chip Ganassi Racing	Honda	01:00.1391

== Race ==
The race started at 3:30 PM ET on July 17, 2022.

=== Race classification ===
Pos	No.	Driver	Team	Engine	Laps	Time/Retired	Pit Stops	Grid	Laps Led	Pts.
1	9	(New Zealand) Scott Dixon W	Chip Ganassi Racing	Honda	85	01:38:45.3087	2	2	40	53
2	26	(United States) Colton Herta	Andretti Autosport with Curb-Agajanian	Honda	85	+0.8106	2	1	17	42
3	7	(Sweden) Felix Rosenqvist	Arrow McLaren SP	Chevrolet	85	+1.3490	2	8	1	36
4	15	(United States) Graham Rahal	Rahal Letterman Lanigan Racing	Honda	85	+4.4830	2	14	6	33
5	8	(Sweden) Marcus Ericsson	Chip Ganassi Racing	Honda	85	+5.1260	2	9		30
6	10	(Spain) Álex Palou	Chip Ganassi Racing	Honda	85	+6.3629	2	22		28
7	60	(France) Simon Pagenaud W	Meyer Shank Racing	Honda	85	+8.7398	2	18		26
8	30	(Denmark) Christian Lundgaard R	Rahal Letterman Lanigan Racing	Honda	85	+9.3820	2	10		24
9	3	(New Zealand) Scott McLaughlin	Team Penske	Chevrolet	85	+10.2868	2	6		22
10	2	(United States) Josef Newgarden W	Team Penske	Chevrolet	85	+10.6561	2	3		20
11	5	(Mexico) Pato O'Ward	Arrow McLaren SP	Chevrolet	85	+12.4284	2	15	3	20
12	18	(United States) David Malukas R	Dale Coyne Racing with HMD Motorsports	Honda	85	+13.3711	2	5		18
13	21	(Netherlands) Rinus VeeKay	Ed Carpenter Racing	Chevrolet	85	+18.2715	2	20	18	18
14	77	(United Kingdom) Callum Ilott R	Juncos Hollinger Racing	Chevrolet	85	+18.4471	3	7		16
15	12	(Australia) Will Power W	Team Penske	Chevrolet	85	+19.0185	2	16		15
16	28	(France) Romain Grosjean	Andretti Autosport	Honda	85	+19.7939	3	11		14
17	06	(Brazil) Hélio Castroneves	Meyer Shank Racing	Honda	85	+20.3903	2	17		13
18	29	(Canada) Devlin DeFrancesco R	Andretti Steinbrenner Autosport	Honda	85	+21.2042	2	12		12
19	45	(United Kingdom) Jack Harvey	Rahal Letterman Lanigan Racing	Honda	85	+21.9470	3	13		11
20	20	(United States) Conor Daly	Ed Carpenter Racing	Chevrolet	85	+24.2445	3	25		10
21	48	(United States) Jimmie Johnson	Chip Ganassi Racing	Honda	73	Contact	6	21		9
22	14	(United States) Kyle Kirkwood R	A. J. Foyt Enterprises	Chevrolet	58	Contact	4	24		8
23	27	(United States) Alexander Rossi	Andretti Autosport	Honda	44	Contact	1	4		7
24	4	(Canada) Dalton Kellett	A. J. Foyt Enterprises	Chevrolet	30	Mechanical	2	23		6
25	51	(Japan) Takuma Sato	Dale Coyne Racing with Rick Ware Racing	Honda	0	Contact		19		5
Fastest lap: (United States) David Malukas (Dale Coyne Racing with HMD Motorsports) – 1:00.8307 (lap 15)

== Championship standings after the race ==
Drivers' Championship standings

	Pos.	Driver	Points
Unchanged	1	(Sweden) Marcus Ericsson	351
Unchanged	2	(Australia) Will Power	316
1	3	(Spain) Álex Palou	314
1	4	(United States) Josef Newgarden	307
1	5	(New Zealand) Scott Dixon	307

Engine manufacturer standings

	Pos.	Manufacturer	Points
Unchanged	1	Chevrolet	826
Unchanged	2	Honda	784

- Note: Only the top five positions are included.
