= 2022 Gallagher Grand Prix =

Indycar race held in Speedway, Indiana

(United States) 2022 Gallagher Grand Prix
Race details
13th round of the 2022 IndyCar season
← Previous race	Next race →
- Date: July 30, 2022
- Official name: Gallagher Grand Prix
- Location: Indianapolis Motor Speedway, Speedway, Indiana
- Course: Permanent road course 2.439 mi / 3.925 km
- Distance: 85 laps 207.315 mi / 333.641 km

Pole position
- Driver: (Sweden) Felix Rosenqvist (Arrow McLaren SP)
- Time: 01:10.2265

Fastest lap
- Driver: (France) Simon Pagenaud (Meyer Shank Racing)
- Time: 01:11.4537 (on lap 12 of 85)

Podium
- First: (United States) Alexander Rossi (Andretti Autosport)
- Second: (Denmark) Christian Lundgaard (Rahal Letterman Lanigan Racing)
- Third: (Australia) Will Power (Team Penske)

Chronology
Previous	Next
May 2022	May 2023

The 2022 Gallagher Grand Prix was the thirteenth round of the 2022 IndyCar season. The race was held on July 30, 2022, in Speedway, Indiana at the Indianapolis Motor Speedway. The race consisted of 85 laps and was won by Alexander Rossi.

== Entry list ==
Key	Meaning
R	Rookie
W	Past winner

No.	Driver	Team	Engine
2	(United States) Josef Newgarden W	Team Penske	Chevrolet
3	(New Zealand) Scott McLaughlin	Team Penske	Chevrolet
4	(Canada) Dalton Kellett	A. J. Foyt Enterprises	Chevrolet
5	(Mexico) Patricio O'Ward	Arrow McLaren SP	Chevrolet
06	(Brazil) Hélio Castroneves	Meyer Shank Racing	Honda
7	(Sweden) Felix Rosenqvist	Arrow McLaren SP	Chevrolet
8	(Sweden) Marcus Ericsson	Chip Ganassi Racing	Honda
9	(New Zealand) Scott Dixon W	Chip Ganassi Racing	Honda
10	(Spain) Álex Palou	Chip Ganassi Racing	Honda
12	(Australia) Will Power W	Team Penske	Chevrolet
14	(United States) Kyle Kirkwood R	A. J. Foyt Enterprises	Chevrolet
15	(United States) Graham Rahal	Rahal Letterman Lanigan Racing	Honda
18	(United States) David Malukas R	Dale Coyne Racing with HMD Motorsports	Honda
20	(United States) Conor Daly	Ed Carpenter Racing	Chevrolet
21	(Netherlands) Rinus VeeKay W	Ed Carpenter Racing	Chevrolet
26	(United States) Colton Herta W	Andretti Autosport	Honda
27	(United States) Alexander Rossi	Andretti Autosport	Honda
28	(France) Romain Grosjean	Andretti Autosport	Honda
29	(Canada) Devlin DeFrancesco R	Andretti Steinbrenner Autosport	Honda
30	(Denmark) Christian Lundgaard R	Rahal Letterman Lanigan Racing	Honda
45	(United Kingdom) Jack Harvey	Rahal Letterman Lanigan Racing	Honda
48	(United States) Jimmie Johnson	Chip Ganassi Racing	Honda
51	(Japan) Takuma Sato	Dale Coyne Racing with Rick Ware Racing	Honda
60	(France) Simon Pagenaud W	Meyer Shank Racing	Honda
77	(United Kingdom) Callum Ilott R	Juncos Hollinger Racing	Chevrolet

== Practice ==
=== Practice 1 ===
Top Practice Speeds
Pos	No.	Driver	Team	Engine	Lap Time
1	27	(United States) Alexander Rossi	Andretti Autosport	Honda	01:10.0919
2	2	(United States) Josef Newgarden W	Team Penske	Chevrolet	01:10.1121
3	26	(United States) Colton Herta W	Andretti Autosport with Curb-Agajanian	Honda	01:10.1507

== Qualifying ==
=== Qualifying classification ===
Pos	No.	Driver	Team	Engine	Time				Final grid
Pos	No.	Driver	Team	Engine	Round 1		Round 2	Round 3	Final grid
Pos	No.	Driver	Team	Engine	Group 1	Group 2	Round 2	Round 3	Final grid
1	7	(Sweden) Felix Rosenqvist	Arrow McLaren SP	Chevrolet	N/A	**01:10.1220**	01:10.0781	**01:10.2265**	1
2	27	(United States) Alexander Rossi	Andretti Autosport	Honda	N/A	01:10.3844	01:10.1295	01:10.5030	2
3	5	(Mexico) Pato O'Ward	Arrow McLaren SP	Chevrolet	01:10.6084	N/A	01:10.1574	01:10.6092	3
4	12	(Australia) Will Power **W**	Team Penske	Chevrolet	01:10.5616	N/A	**01:10.0277**	01:10.6224	4
5	2	(United States) Josef Newgarden **W**	Team Penske	Chevrolet	01:10.4240	N/A	01:10.1156	01:10.6968	5
6	30	(Denmark) Christian Lundgaard **R**	Rahal Letterman Lanigan Racing	Honda	01:10.7718	N/A	01:10.1805	01:10.7280	6
7	10	(Spain) Álex Palou	Chip Ganassi Racing	Honda	N/A	01:10.3786	01:10.2074	N/A	7
8	21	(Netherlands) Rinus VeeKay **W**	Ed Carpenter Racing	Chevrolet	N/A	01:10.1821	01:10.3100	N/A	8
9	26	(United States) Colton Herta **W**	Andretti Autosport with Curb-Agajanian	Honda	N/A	01:10.1641	01:10.3532	N/A	9
10	20	(United States) Conor Daly	Ed Carpenter Racing	Chevrolet	**01:10.3822**	N/A	01:10.5135	N/A	10
11	18	(United States) David Malukas **R**	Dale Coyne Racing with HMD Motorsports	Honda	N/A	01:10.6239	01:10.5636	N/A	11
12	60	(France) Simon Pagenaud **W**	Meyer Shank Racing	Honda	01:10.7911	N/A	01:10.7624	N/A	12
13	45	(United Kingdom) Jack Harvey	Rahal Letterman Lanigan Racing	Honda	01:10.8564	N/A	N/A	N/A	13
14	29	(Canada) Devlin DeFrancesco **R**	Andretti Steinbrenner Autosport	Honda	N/A	01:10.7073	N/A	N/A	14
15	3	(New Zealand) Scott McLaughlin	Team Penske	Chevrolet	01:10.9067	N/A	N/A	N/A	15
16	06	(Brazil) Hélio Castroneves	Meyer Shank Racing	Honda	N/A	01:10.7560	N/A	N/A	16
17	15	(United States) Graham Rahal	Rahal Letterman Lanigan Racing	Honda	01:10.9093	N/A	N/A	N/A	17
18	51	(Japan) Takuma Sato	Dale Coyne Racing with Rick Ware Racing	Honda	N/A	01:10.8276	N/A	N/A	18
19	77	(United Kingdom) Callum Ilott **R**	Juncos Hollinger Racing	Chevrolet	01:11.1195	N/A	N/A	N/A	19
20	9	(New Zealand) Scott Dixon **W**	Chip Ganassi Racing	Honda	N/A	01:10.8938	N/A	N/A	20
21	14	(United States) Kyle Kirkwood **R**	A. J. Foyt Enterprises	Chevrolet	01:11.2156	N/A	N/A	N/A	21
22	28	(France) Romain Grosjean	Andretti Autosport	Honda	N/A	01:11.0244	N/A	N/A	22
23	48	(United States) Jimmie Johnson	Chip Ganassi Racing	Honda	01:11.7710	N/A	N/A	N/A	23
24	4	(Canada) Dalton Kellett	A. J. Foyt Enterprises	Chevrolet	N/A	01:12.0060	N/A	N/A	24
25	8	(Sweden) Marcus Ericsson	Chip Ganassi Racing	Honda	N/A	No Time	N/A	N/A	25

Notes

- **Bold text** indicates fastest time set in session.

== Warmup ==
Top Practice Speeds
Pos	No.	Driver	Team	Engine	Lap Time
1	2	(United States) Josef Newgarden W	Team Penske	Chevrolet	01:10.9281
2	14	(United States) Kyle Kirkwood R	A. J. Foyt Enterprises	Chevrolet	01:10.9895
3	30	(Denmark) Christian Lundgaard R	Rahal Letterman Lanigan Racing	Honda	01:11.0317

== Race ==
The race started at 12:30 PM ET on July 30, 2022.

=== Race classification ===
Pos	No.	Driver	Team	Engine	Laps	Time/Retired	Pit Stops	Grid	Laps Led	Pts.
1	27	(United States) Alexander Rossi	Andretti Autosport	Honda	85	01:48:39.1825	3	2	44	53
2	30	(Denmark) Christian Lundgaard R	Rahal Letterman Lanigan Racing	Honda	85	+3.5441	3	6		40
3	12	(Australia) Will Power W	Team Penske	Chevrolet	85	+14.8481	3	4	7	36
4	3	(New Zealand) Scott McLaughlin	Team Penske	Chevrolet	85	+15.9694	3	15	10	33
5	2	(United States) Josef Newgarden W	Team Penske	Chevrolet	85	+18.4253	3	5		30
6	21	(Netherlands) Rinus VeeKay W	Ed Carpenter Racing	Chevrolet	85	+22.9626	3	8		28
7	15	(United States) Graham Rahal	Rahal Letterman Lanigan Racing	Honda	85	+23.3542	3	17		26
8	9	(New Zealand) Scott Dixon W	Chip Ganassi Racing	Honda	85	+23.6130	3	20		24
9	7	(Sweden) Felix Rosenqvist	Arrow McLaren SP	Chevrolet	85	+24.4659	3	1	7	24
10	10	(Spain) Álex Palou	Chip Ganassi Racing	Honda	85	+27.6401	3	7		20
11	8	(Sweden) Marcus Ericsson	Chip Ganassi Racing	Honda	85	+35.0774	3	25		19
12	5	(Mexico) Pato O'Ward	Arrow McLaren SP	Chevrolet	85	+43.0641	3	3		18
13	18	(United States) David Malukas R	Dale Coyne Racing with HMD Motorsports	Honda	85	+50.1868	3	11		17
14	77	(United Kingdom) Callum Ilott R	Juncos Hollinger Racing	Chevrolet	85	+51.9201	3	19		16
15	51	(Japan) Takuma Sato	Dale Coyne Racing with Rick Ware Racing	Honda	85	+57.1069	3	18		15
16	28	(France) Romain Grosjean	Andretti Autosport	Honda	85	+59.0527	3	22		14
17	20	(United States) Conor Daly	Ed Carpenter Racing	Chevrolet	85	+1:00.1316	3	10		13
18	29	(Canada) Devlin DeFrancesco R	Andretti Steinbrenner Autosport	Honda	85	+1:01.7880	3	14		12
19	06	(Brazil) Hélio Castroneves	Meyer Shank Racing	Honda	85	+1:03.4684	4	16		11
20	45	(United Kingdom) Jack Harvey	Rahal Letterman Lanigan Racing	Honda	85	+1:04.5997	3	13		10
21	4	(Canada) Dalton Kellett	A. J. Foyt Enterprises	Chevrolet	84	+1 Lap	3	24		9
22	48	(United States) Jimmie Johnson	Chip Ganassi Racing	Honda	84	+1 Lap	3	23		8
23	14	(United States) Kyle Kirkwood R	A. J. Foyt Enterprises	Chevrolet	84	+1 Lap	5	21		7
24	26	(United States) Colton Herta W	Andretti Autosport with Curb-Agajanian	Honda	42	Gearbox	2	9	17	7
25	60	(France) Simon Pagenaud W	Meyer Shank Racing	Honda	34	Out Of Fuel	1	12		5
Fastest lap: (France) Simon Pagenaud (Meyer Shank Racing) – 01:11.4537 (lap 12)

== Championship standings after the race ==
Drivers' Championship standings

	Pos.	Driver	Points
1	1	(Australia) Will Power	431
1	2	(Sweden) Marcus Ericsson	422
Unchanged	3	(United States) Josef Newgarden	399
Unchanged	4	(New Zealand) Scott Dixon	393
Unchanged	5	(Mexico) Pato O'Ward	385

Engine manufacturer standings

	Pos.	Manufacturer	Points
Unchanged	1	Chevrolet	1161
Unchanged	2	Honda	1031

- Note: Only the top five positions are included.

Previous race: 2022 Hy-Vee IndyCar Race Weekend	IndyCar Series; 2022 season	Next race: 2022 Big Machine Music City Grand Prix
Previous race: 2021 Big Machine Spiked Coolers Grand Prix	Gallagher Grand Prix	Next race: 2023 Gallagher Grand Prix
