= Will Power =

Australian and American racing driver (born 1981)

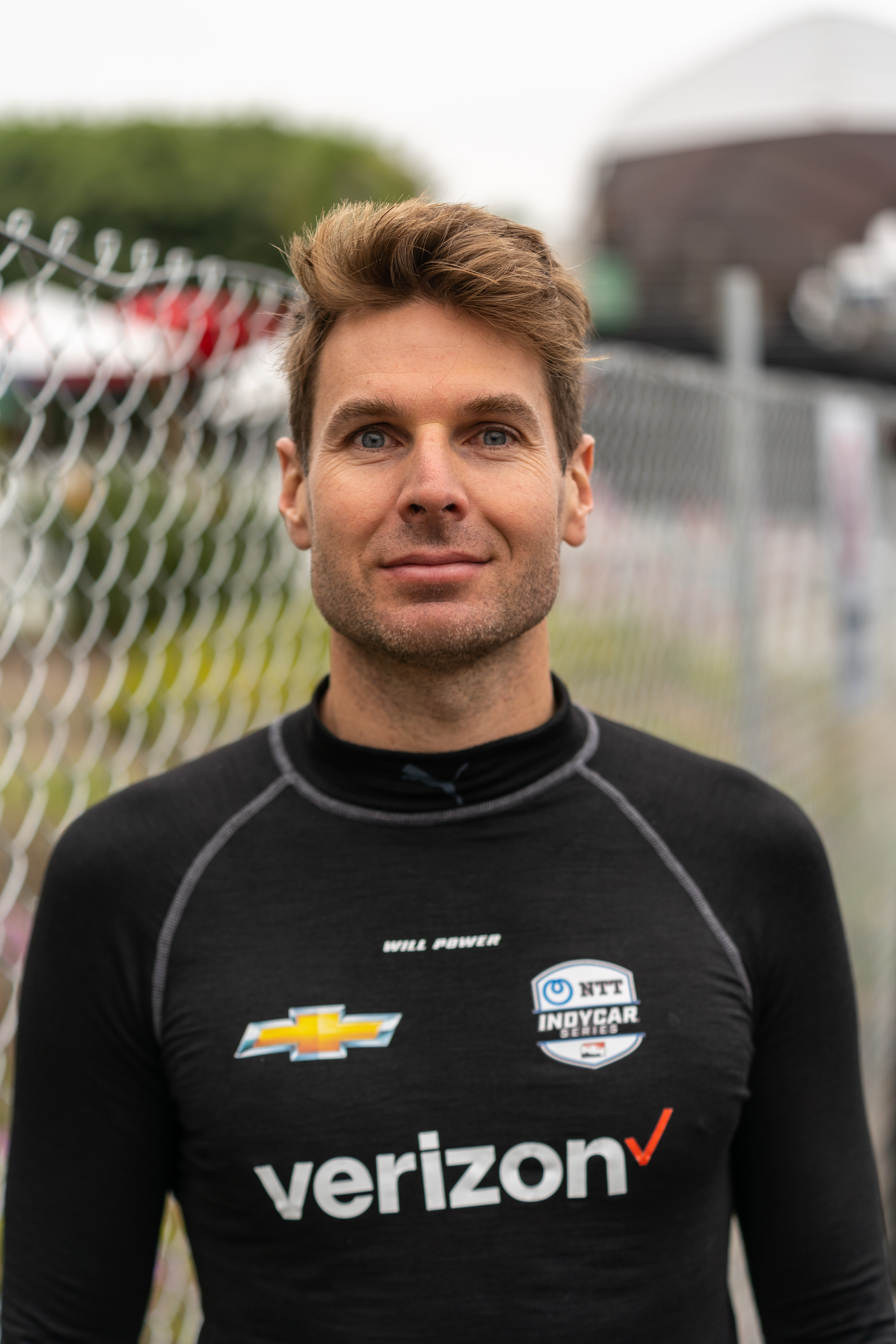
- Power at the 2021 Acura Grand Prix of Long Beach
- Nationality: (Australia) Australian
- Born: William Steven Power; 1 March 1981 (age 45) Toowoomba, Queensland, Australia
- Relatives: Bob Power (father)
- Categorisation: FIA Platinum

IndyCar Series career
- 304 races run over 19 years
- Team: No. 26 (Andretti Global)
- Best finish: 1st (2014, 2022)
- First race: 2008 Gainsco Auto Insurance Indy 300 (Homestead)
- Last race: 2026 Mission Grand Prix of Monterey (Laguna Seca)
- First win: 2008 Grand Prix of Long Beach (Long Beach)
- Last win: 2025 BitNile.com Grand Prix of Portland (Portland)
Wins	Podiums	Poles
43	107	65

Champ Car career
- 30 races run over 3 years
- Best finish: 4th (2007)
- First race: 2005 Lexmark Indy 300 (Surfers Paradise)
- Last race: 2007 Gran Premio Tecate (Mexico City)
- First win: 2007 Las Vegas Grand Prix (Las Vegas)
- Last win: 2007 Steelback Grand Prix (Toronto)
Wins	Podiums	Poles
2	6	6

Previous series
- 1999–2000 2000–01 2002 2002 2003–04 2005 2005–06: Queensland Formula Ford; Australian Formula Ford; Australian Formula 3 Australian Drivers' Championship; British Formula Three; World Series by Renault; A1 Grand Prix

Championship titles
- 2000 2002 2010–2012, 2014, 2015 2014, 2022 2018: Queensland Formula Ford; Australian Drivers' Championship; IndyCar Series Road Course Trophy; IndyCar Series; Indianapolis 500 Winner

Awards
- 2006: Champ Car Rookie of the Year

William Steven Power (born 1 March 1981) is an Australian and American racing driver who competes in the IndyCar Series, driving the No. 26 Dallara-Honda for Andretti Global. He won the 2018 Indianapolis 500 and has won the IndyCar Championship twice, in 2014 and 2022. Power is one of the most successful drivers in IndyCar racing history, currently fourth all-time in wins (45), first all-time in poles (71), fourth all-time in podiums (113), and fourth all-time in top 5 finishes (147)

== Australian racing ==
Power was born in Toowoomba, Queensland. The son of open-wheel racer Bob Power, he started his career in Queensland driving a Datsun 1200 at Morgan Park Raceway, Warwick as well as at Carnel Raceway, Stanthorpe. In 1999, Power began driving an ageing family-owned Swift SC92F in the Queensland Formula Ford Championship, winning races in a sporadic campaign. In 2000, Power ran a full campaign leading to his first title in the Swift while simultaneously racing a late-model Spectrum 07 on the Australian Formula Ford Championship, finishing a promising seventh. Still running a small family-oriented team in 2001, Power upgraded to a Stealth RF95, a Western Australian modification of a 1995 Van Diemen. Power finished second in the series behind the factory-supported Van Diemen driver, Will Davison.

After three years of Formula Ford racing, Power moved into Formula Holden, racing for the Graham Watson-owned Ralt Australia team driving a Reynard 94D. Power swept all before him in Formula Holden, winning the title by over 50 points from Stewart McColl, claiming the 2002 Australian Drivers' Championship by winning 7 times and achieving 3 pole positions.

Midway through the 2002 season, Power was allowed to drive for the Bevan Carrick-owned Cooltemp Racing Formula 3 team, driving a Dallara-Toyota as well in the Australian Formula 3 Championship. Despite missing the opening races, Power missed out on winning the Formula 3 championship by only a handful of points to James Manderson.

== Racing in Europe ==
Europe beckoned and in 2003 Power joined the British Formula 3 Championship racing initially for Diamond Racing, then later for Fortec Motorsport as tight funding prevented a full campaign. A second place at Thruxton demonstrated his ability and Power mounted a full campaign in 2004 with Alan Docking Racing but finished the season in the ninth position with five podium finishes.

Power tested a Minardi Formula One car in 2004 with his Australian Formula Ford and British Formula 3 rival Will Davison in Italy.

During 2005, Power competed in the World Series by Renault for the Carlin Motorsport team, where he proved very competitive. During the WSR championship, he scored two race victories, with four trips to the podium in total, and qualified his car on the front row five times. In addition to driving in the WSR, Power was also one of the featured drivers for the Australian team in the 2005–06 A1 Grand Prix season. Power raced in the series opener at Brands Hatch and piloted Australia to a second-place finish behind Team Brazil.

== Champ Car ==
In late 2005, Power joined Champ Car's Team Australia at the Lexmark Indy 300 event at Surfers Paradise in Australia, which also resulted in his departure from the World Series by Renault championship; that season was still in progress and Power ultimately ended seventh in the championship despite his departure. In the Indy 300 Power ran strongly until being knocked off the track by teammate Alex Tagliani. After the Surfers Paradise event, he signed a multi-year contract to race for the team, which began immediately at the next Champ Car round in Mexico City after Tagliani's teammate Marcus Marshall was released for what was described as a "serious breach of contract".

Power drove full-time for Team Australia in 2006. He performed well throughout the season with nine top-ten finishes and strong qualifying results. In Mexico at the final round of the season, Power took his first podium finish in Champ Car. He won the "rookie of the year" award and finished in sixth place in the championship standings.

In his home race in 2006, at Surfers Paradise in Australia, he scored the first pole position of his career in Champ Cars, in front of his home crowd. However, contact from Paul Tracy in the pit lane and then an ambitious overtaking move by Sébastien Bourdais resulted in a bent left steering arm, and he fell to the back, one lap down by the time the car was repaired, eventually finishing twelfth.

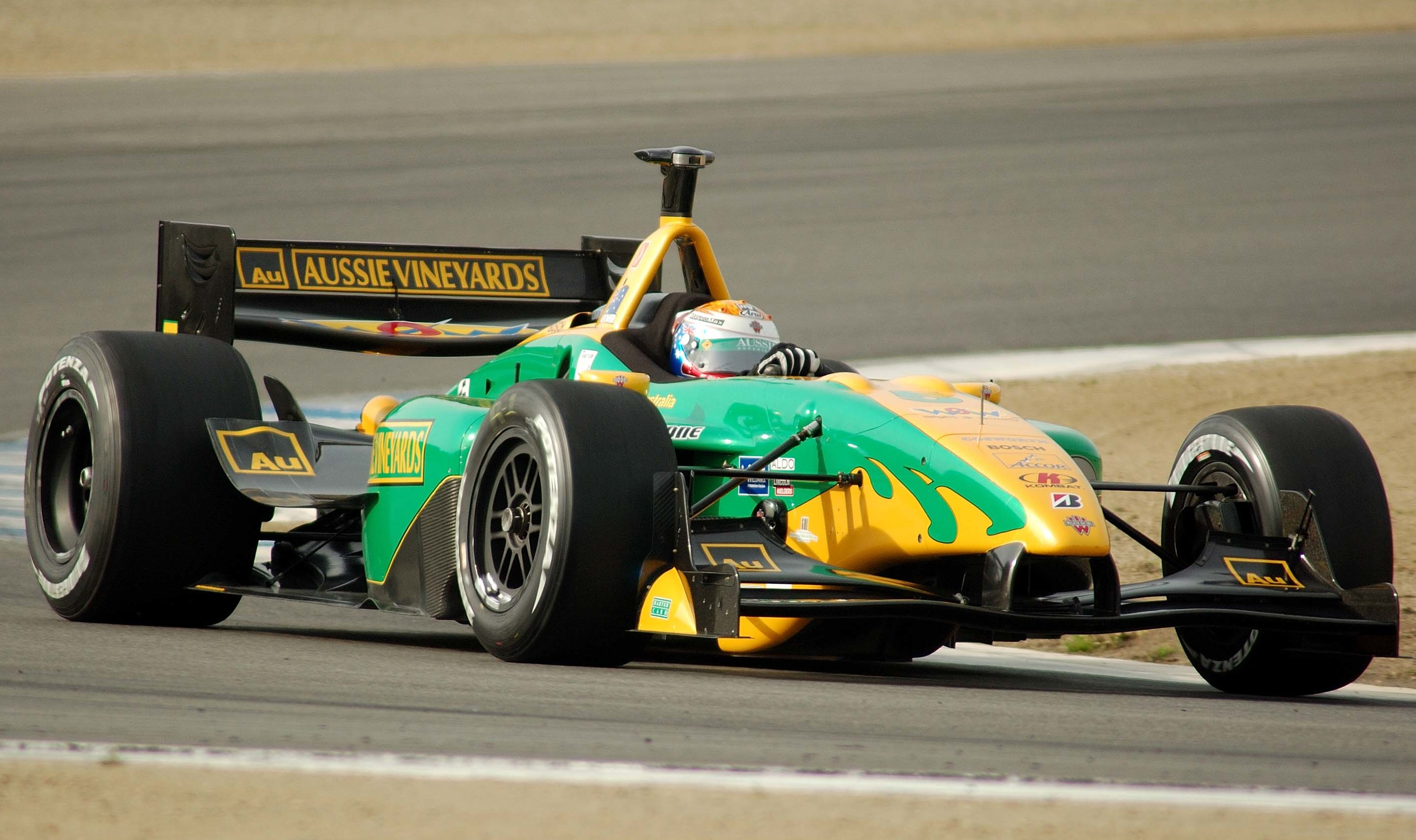
Power testing for what would be the final season of Champ Car in 2007.

On 8 April 2007, Power won his first Champ Car race at the inaugural Vegas Grand Prix, held on the streets of Las Vegas, Nevada, United States. He qualified on the pole position and led most laps, becoming the first Australian driver to win in the series. On 8 July, at the Steelback Grand Prix of Toronto, with rain pouring down and visibility near zero when he got behind other cars, Power decided it was time to get aggressive. Power drove from fourth to first in fourteen laps, finally splashing past rookie Ryan Dalziel to take the lead with 23 minutes to go, and went on to an easy victory.

To get to the lead, Power also had to pass three-time Champ Car World Series champion Sébastien Bourdais and rookie Neel Jani. Thanks to a series of late caution flags, he was able to go after each of them in turn. "I was close behind Sebastien and I knew he was quite tentative in the wet and I attacked him," Power said. "I got him on a restart. Then the next restart, I got Neel and the next restart, I got Dalziel. It's just about being aggressive at the right time and not hitting anyone". "I just drove so hard here because we've just had so much bad luck in the last few races," said Power, whose first Champ Car victory came in the 2007 opener in Las Vegas. "I didn't care; I just went hard. The car was good in the wet. It was good in the dry, and we stuck it to them." Power had podium finishes at Long Beach, Mont-Tremblant, and Mexico City and pole positions at Houston, Edmonton, Surfers Paradise, and Mexico City to place fourth in the final point standings in 2007.

== IndyCar ==
=== 2008 season ===
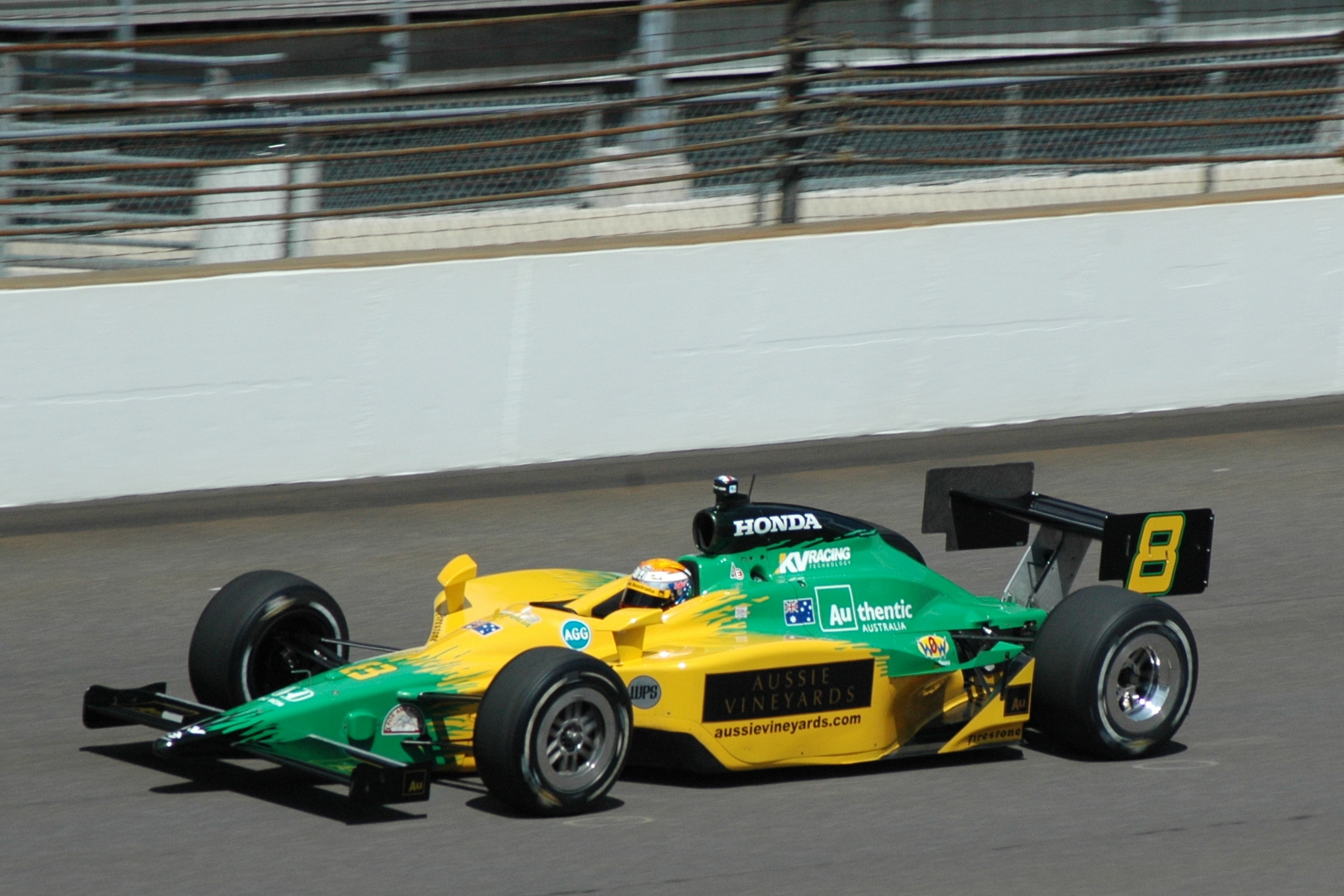
Power during practice for the 2008 Indianapolis 500.

The merger of Champ Car and the IndyCar left his future uncertain. Power's Walker Racing team announced they would not be making the switch from Champ Car to IndyCar due to a lack of sponsorship. However, Power later signed with KV Racing Technology, to drive the No. 8 Aussie Vineyards—Team Australia car in 2008, continuing to work with Team Australia boss Craig Gore.

Power won the final Champ Car race at Long Beach in 2008, also giving Power his first IndyCar Series win. He scored two top-five finishes in IndyCar Series races, enough for twelfth overall, outpointed by teammate Oriol Servià. In the non-points event in Surfers' Paradise, Australia, Power won the pole position but crashed out while leading the race.

=== 2009 season ===
Team Penske announced on 13 January 2009 that for the 2009 IndyCar Series season, Power would replace Hélio Castroneves at the helm of the No. 3 Team Penske Honda-Dallara while Castroneves attended to his federal tax evasion charges. Power drove the No. 3 Team Penske Honda-Dallara to a sixth place finish in the Grand Prix of St. Petersburg, the first race of the year. Following St. Petersburg, Castroneves was acquitted of all tax evasion charges and returned to the team for the following race at the Grand Prix of Long Beach. Roger Penske came prepared for this scenario, however, and had spare cars on hand for both St. Petersburg and Long Beach, employing the option beginning at Long Beach and continuing through five more races that season. Power's new car, the No. 12 Penske Racing Verizon Wireless Honda/Dallara was officially entered for the Long Beach Grand Prix late on Friday evening and all the setup data garnered from his two sessions in the No. 3 Dallara was successfully transferred over. Power stormed to a dominant pole position with the last-minute effort and ultimately finished second to Dario Franchitti after leading 16 laps. Power was also entered in the same third car for the Indianapolis 500, in which he finished in fifth place after a pit crew gaffe on the final stop – while Power was running 2nd – cost him a shot at Castroneves for the victory. To reward Power for his efforts, he was retained by the team to drive in five more races in Toronto, Edmonton, Kentucky, Sonoma, and Homestead. His team was crewed by Penske's Rolex Sports Car Series team, as Power's races were specifically scheduled on their RSCS off-weekends. Power's dreams and efforts came to fruition when he captured his first IndyCar race win, driving the No. 12, in dominant fashion at the Rexall Edmonton Indy.

Power's season was brought to an abrupt close during practice for the 2009 Motorola Indy 300 in Sonoma however, as Nelson Philippe spun exiting turn 3 and stalled in the middle of the racing groove. As turn 3 is a completely blind corner, taken at high speed while cresting a hill, oncoming drivers had no indication there was anything over the hill and no time to react once they got there. E. J. Viso could barely avoid him, making light contact, but Power, following just behind Viso, had nowhere to go and crashed heavily into Philippe. Both drivers were airlifted from the racetrack in short order. Power had two fractured vertebrae while Philippe suffered a fractured ankle. Both drivers were concussed in the incident and were hospitalised. Both drivers' injuries would cause them to miss the rest of 2009 season.

=== 2010 season ===
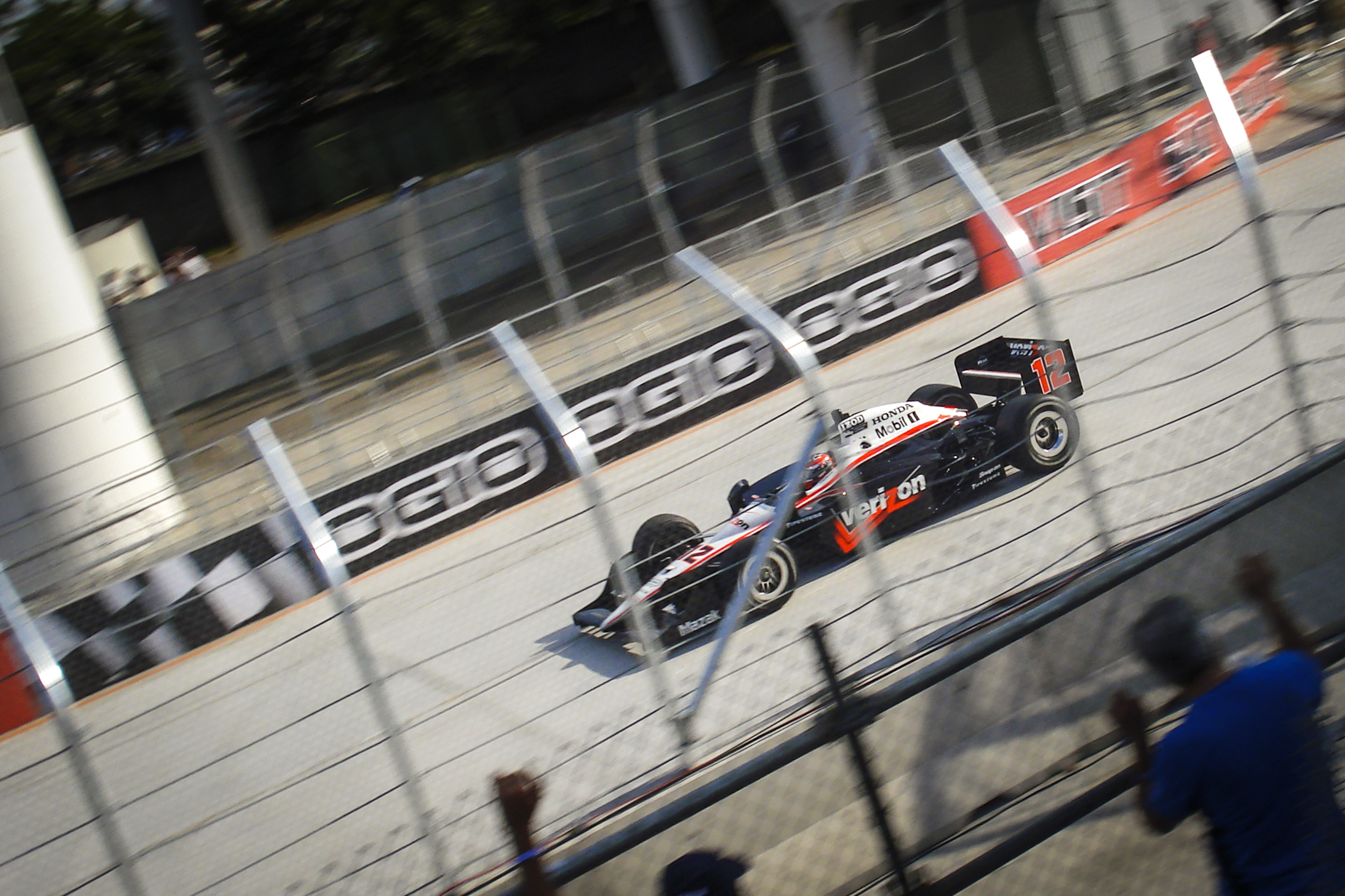
Power at the São Paulo Indy 300 in 2010

On 19 November 2009, Team Penske announced that Power would join the team full-time for the 2010 season with sponsorship from Verizon Wireless. Power dominantly opened the season, winning the first two races of the 2010 season at Brazil and St. Petersburg, making him the first IndyCar driver since Sam Hornish Jr. in 2001 to win the first two events of the year. He went on to win from the pole at Watkins Glen International, giving Roger Penske his first IndyCar Series win at the historic track. Over the course of the season, Power scored five wins (all on road courses) and a record eight pole positions. Power's efforts were rewarded with triumph in the Mario Andretti Road Course Championship, winning the inaugural Mario Andretti Trophy as the road course champion for the 2010 IndyCar Series season.

=== 2011 season ===
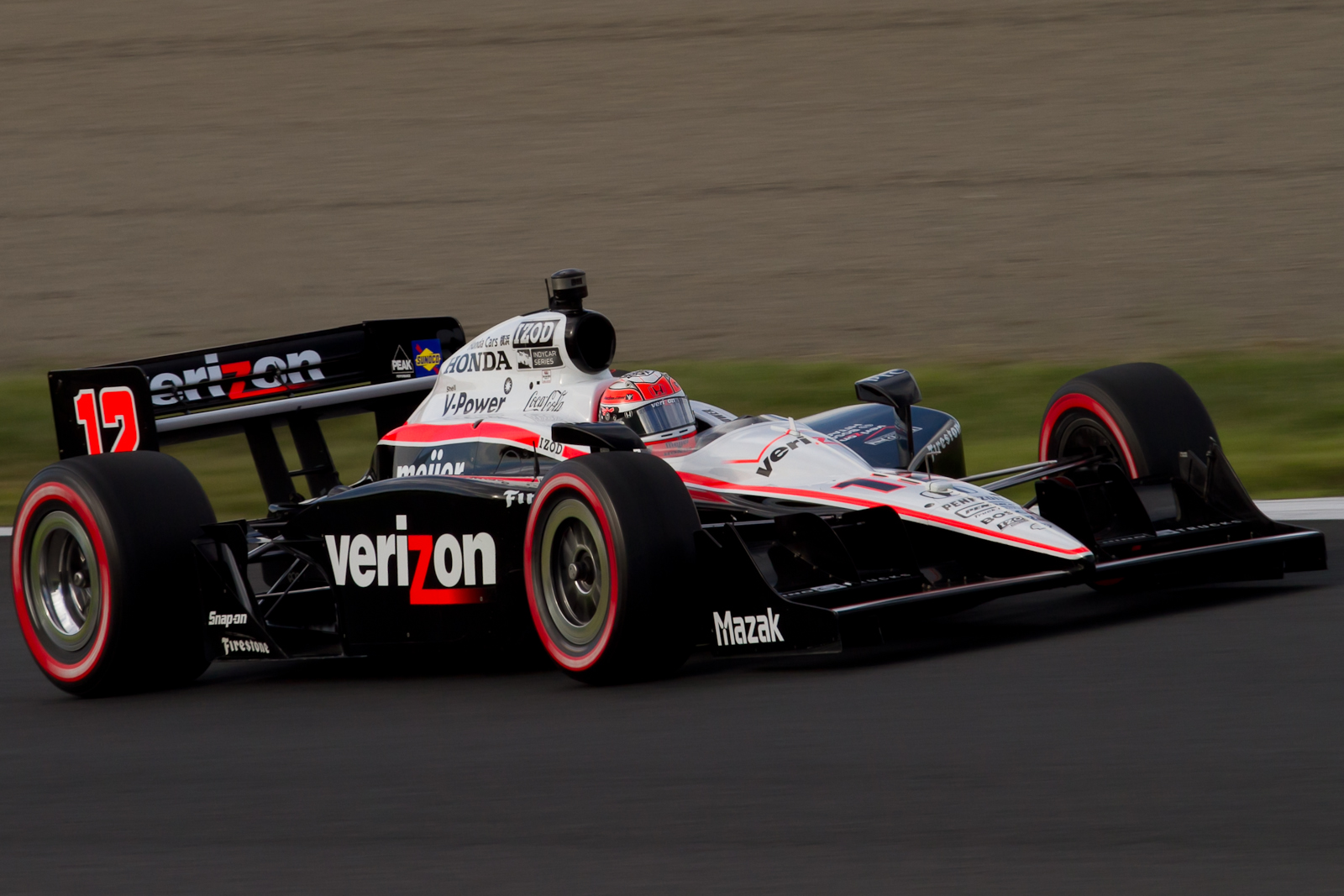
Power qualifying for the Indy Japan 300.

During the 2011 IndyCar Series season he won six races; Barber Motorsports Park, São Paulo, the second doubleheader event at Texas Motor Speedway, Edmonton City Center Airport, Infineon Raceway, and the inaugural Baltimore Grand Prix. However, his season was far from easy. At Toronto, he and championship leader Dario Franchitti touched in turn 3 while battling for fifth, resulting in a spin for Power, which put him midpack where he was hit by former teammate Alex Tagliani. Power was irate with both drivers, particularly Franchitti, who with some level of controversy was not penalised for the contact and won the race.

With a few laps to go during the IndyCar Series' 225-mile return to New Hampshire Motor Speedway, amid protests from drivers and teams to not restart because of wet track conditions, the race was restarted and Power caught in the ensuing melee started by a spinning Danica Patrick. An irate Power exited his vehicle and spoke with several officials, even consulting with his race strategist Tim Cindric before displaying the finger to IndyCar director of competition Brian Barnhart. Power's immortal obscene gesture was captured on live television and met with immense support from IndyCar Series fans as well as support from members of several other team organisations in the paddock. Power's "Double Angry Birds" gesture, however, ended up landing him with a $30,000 fine, payable through public services to the league, although team owner Roger Penske said he would gladly pay the fine off. Power won the pole at the Kentucky Speedway and led the first 48 laps until he had contact with rookie Ana Beatriz as he exited his pit box.

The resulting damage relegated him to nineteenth place, while title rival Franchitti led the most laps, finished 2nd, and took an eighteen-point advantage. Power's season ended in a violent, high-speed 15-car crash at the final race of the season in Las Vegas that claimed the life of British driver Dan Wheldon. Wheldon, Power, and three other drivers were taken to the hospital. He lost any chance of having the points championship after the wreck, due in part to his role in the accident (his car was damaged beyond repair) and also to the fact that the race was abandoned following the wreck. Power was later diagnosed with a vertebral compression fracture in his thoracic vertebrae and had surgery to correct the problem.

=== 2012 season ===
For the 2012 IndyCar Series season, Power returned to Team Penske to once again pilot the No. 12 car with teammates Castroneves and Briscoe. The road and street course heavy 2012 schedule played into Power's strength, making him one of the pre-season favorites to win the championship. After opening the season with a seventh-place finish at St. Petersburg, Power scored three consecutive victories at Barber Motorsports Park, the streets of Long Beach, and the streets of São Paulo to vault into the championship lead. Power held onto the points lead until the tenth of fifteen races when rival driver Ryan Hunter-Reay scored his third of three consecutive wins to take over the lead. Power regained the lead and built a 36-point advantage with two races remaining after strong second-place finishes at Mid-Ohio and Sonoma, coupled with two misfortunate finishes by Hunter-Reay. The season's penultimate race on the streets of Baltimore saw Power and Hunter-Reay choosing different strategies when the rain began falling.

Electing to remain on slick tires despite the wet conditions, Hunter-Reay gained the track position necessary to earn a much-needed win, while Power finished sixth. With the lead cut to seventeen points entering the MAVTV 500 season finale on the two-mile Auto Club Speedway in Fontana, California, Power was well-positioned to earn his first championship. Those hopes took a huge hit when Power's car spun and hit the wall on lap 55 of the 250-lap race. Despite heavy damage, Team Penske got Power's car back on track long enough to gain an additional position, forcing Hunter-Reay to finish fifth or better to win the championship. Hunter-Reay ran outside of championship position for most of the race but finally moved into the top five with 21 laps remaining, eventually finishing fourth. Hunter-Reay's championship resulted in Power finishing second in the standings for the third consecutive season. Despite losing the overall championship, Power won for the third time the Mario Andretti Trophy as the 2012 road course champion.

=== 2013 season ===
The 2013 season began very slowly for Power. In St. Petersburg, during a caution period, his car was run over by J. R. Hildebrand's, resulting in damage to both cars; Power was relegated to a sixteenth place finish. In Barber, he finished fifth. In São Paulo, a blown engine and fire on the front stretch forced him to end his day early. He was competitive in Indianapolis, but he was not a factor in the race. He was involved in a crash in Detroit that took out several other cars, yet he remained in the top ten in points. Things started to pick up after Mid-Ohio. In Sonoma, after Scott Dixon collided with one of his crew members, Dixon was forced to make a drive-through penalty, handing the lead of the race to Power. He led the next twelve laps en route to his first win of 2013. He again collided with Dixon in Baltimore that ended up having the bad end for Dixon. In Houston on Saturday, Power and Scott Dixon battled all day until lap 64, when a slow pit stop cost him the win. Dixon ended up winning that day. Power's teammate, Hélio Castroneves, had troubles throughout the day. On Sunday, Power avenged Dixon, as he dominated the race and won over Dixon. However, the win was overshadowed by Dixon's teammate, Dario Franchitti, crashing on the final lap. Power won the season finale in Fontana to end 2013 on a hot streak, winning three out of the last five races. He finished fourth in points for the season.

=== 2014 season ===
Power won the 2014 season-opener in St. Petersburg after passing pole-sitter Takuma Sato (2017 Indianapolis 500 winner) on lap 31. However, controversy arose during the race when, with 28 laps remaining, Power seemed to slow down, bunching the field and causing Jack Hawksworth to crash into Marco Andretti.

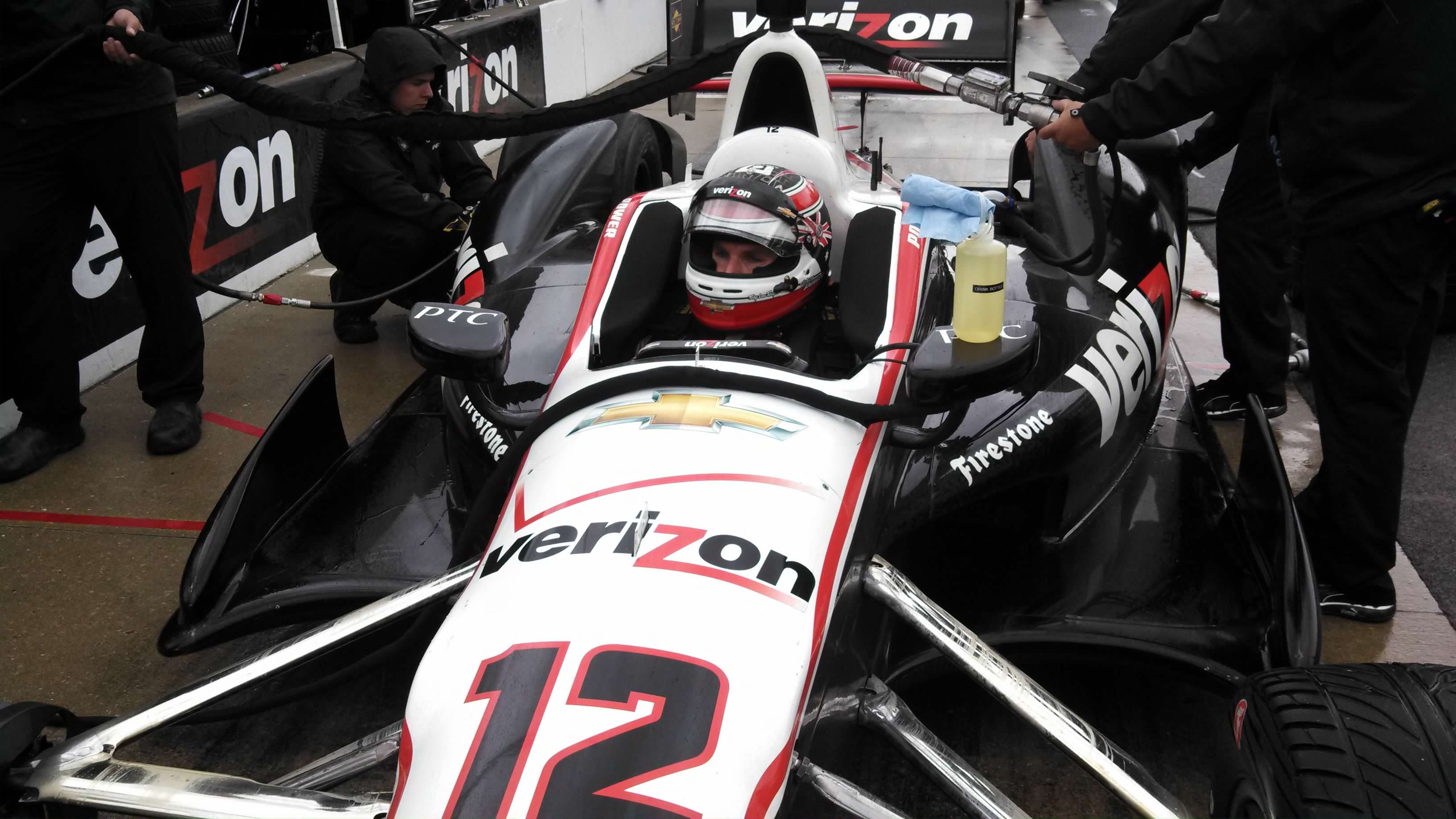
Will Power prepares to practice for the inaugural IndyCar race on the Indianapolis road course.

In Long Beach, after some controversy between him and Simon Pagenaud, he finished second behind Mike Conway. At Barber, mistakes cost him a shot at victory lane. In the GP of Indianapolis, a pit road penalty cost him a win. In the Indianapolis 500, he was merely a factor in the race. In the first of two races at Detroit, Power battled hard with Graham Rahal in the closing laps but came home with the victory for hometown Roger Penske, his team owner. The second day, his teammate won. At Texas, again a pit road penalty cost him yet another trophy, but he rallied back to finish second in a dramatic finish.

In the final race at Fontana, Power drove on to finish in ninth and won his first IndyCar championship, 62 points ahead of Hélio Castroneves in the standings. Power broke down in tears as he stood on the championship podium.

=== 2015 season ===
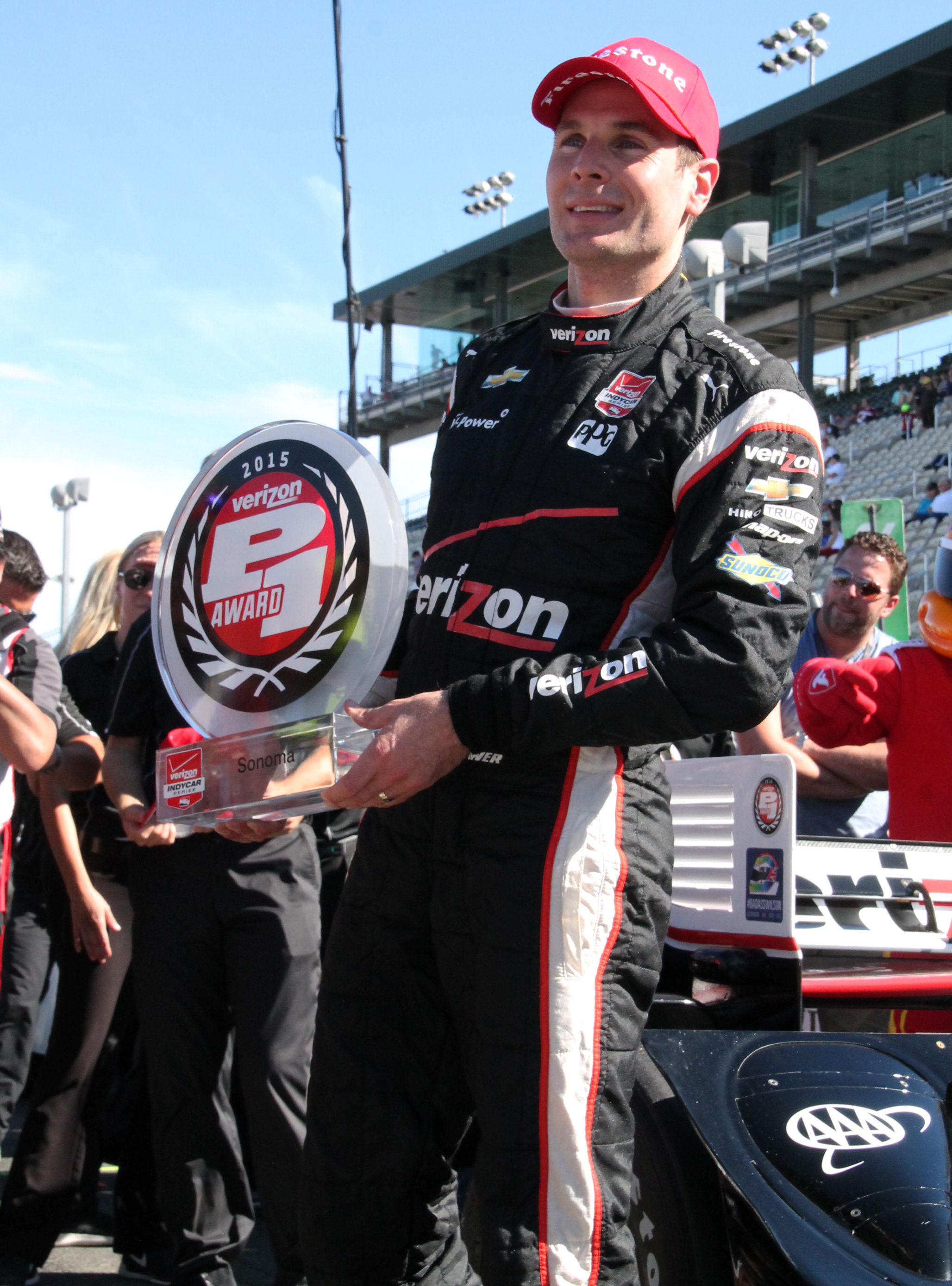
Power won the Verizon P1 Award for taking the pole at the 2015 GoPro Grand Prix.

Power had a difficult 2015 IndyCar Series season but somehow managed to finish third in the championship despite several incidents, including being taken out completely without fault on consecutive ovals. Showing flashes of speed he for example took pole for the season double points finale at Sonoma. He broke a record and clocked 1:16.2597, at an average speed of 112.589 mph (181.194 km/h). As it was, a win would have taken him ahead of eventual champion Scott Dixon, but would not have been enough to put him ahead of teammate. The duo of Power and Juan Pablo Montoya. collided during the race, ending Power's championship chances.

The vast majority of Power's success in IndyCar has been on the road and street courses, where he has often shown great speed during qualifying and races. Although he won the second leg at Texas Motor Speedway, the general inability to squeeze out ovals wins hampered Power in his first three title runs. In 2014, he won at the miler in Milwaukee and finished second at Texas, helping him to seal his first title. At the end of 2015, Power had won three oval races, one each on long, intermediate, and short ovals, with the nineteen road course wins being spread out over ten wins on street courses and nine on runoff road courses, with two of those being at the hybrid airport track in Edmonton. Being more seasoned on ovals, Power came close to winning the 2015 Indianapolis 500 on his eighth attempt only just losing out to teammate Juan Pablo Montoya.

=== 2016 season ===
Power missed the season-opening race at St. Petersburg due to the medical team believing that he had a concussion stemming from an accident that he had in one of the practices leading up to the race; it turned out that he did not have a concussion (it could have been an ear or sinus infection that was causing the concussion-like symptoms). Despite this setback, Power would go on to finish second in the points behind his teammate Simon Pagenaud and won four of the sixteen races that year: the second race at Detroit (Belle Isle), Road America, Toronto, and Pocono.

=== 2017 season ===
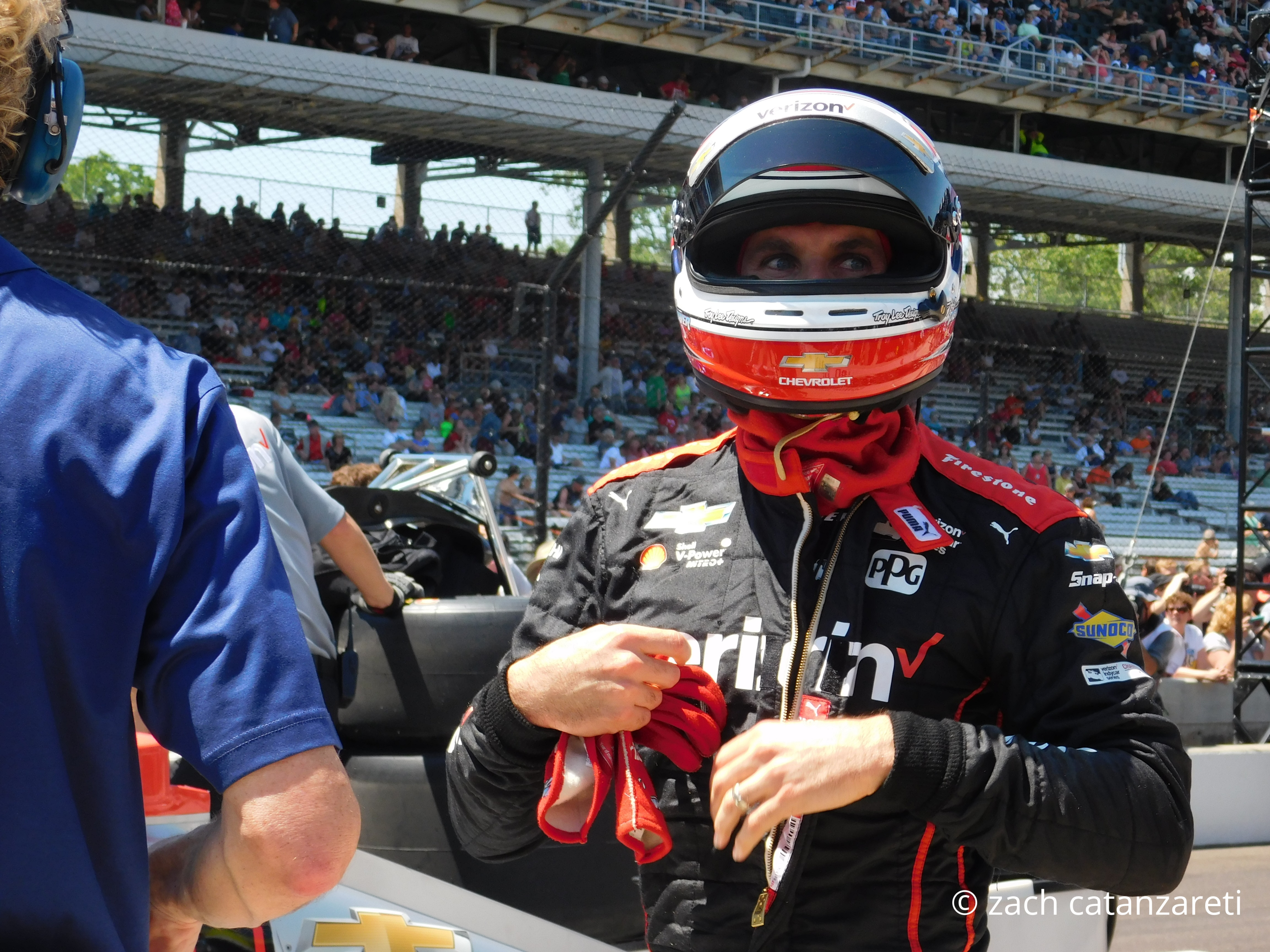
Power at the 2017 Indianapolis 500

Power's 2017 season was not as good as his 2016 season, despite not missing any races. He only finished fifth in the points and claimed three victories: Indianapolis Grand Prix, Texas, and Pocono. However, Power did claim more pole positions in 2017 – five – compared with the one he received in 2016.

=== 2018 season ===
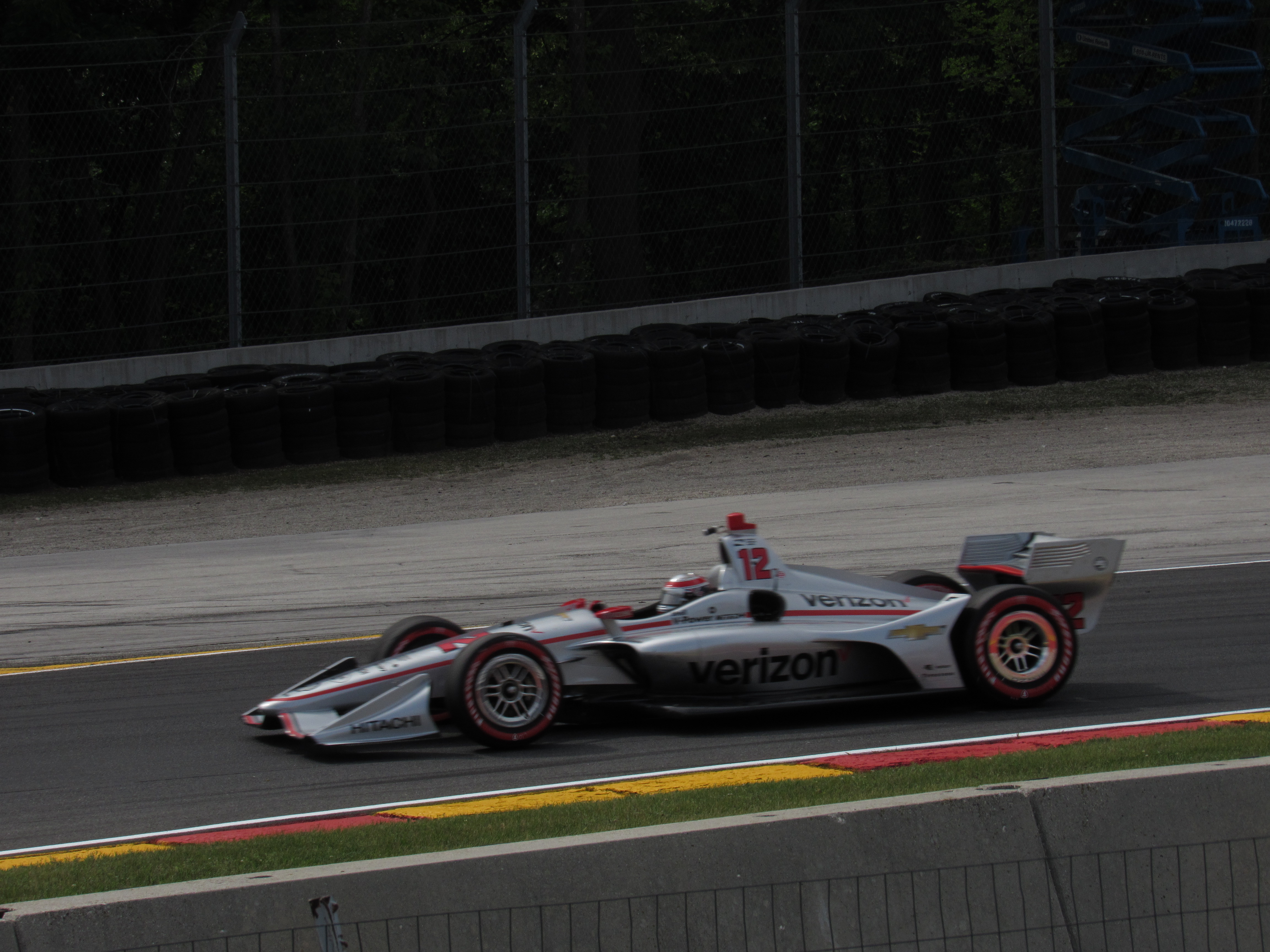
Power at Road America in 2018

Power would emerge as a championship contender once again 2018. Despite a slow start to the season, including DNFs at Phoenix and Birmingham, Power won the 2018 IndyCar Grand Prix, scoring Team Penske's two-hundredth win in the series. Power won the 102nd running of the Indianapolis 500 on May 27, 2018. He also won at Gateway. He was in contention for the series title up until a late accident at Portland took him out of the championship fight.

=== 2019 season ===
Power again started the season slowly but by the end of the season found his form and continued his winning ways, winning at Pocono Raceway and at the Grand Prix of Portland, increasing his streak of winning at least one race per season in IndyCar to ten seasons.

=== 2020 season ===
Power again returned to Team Penske in the pandemic shortened 2020 season. Despite again starting the season slowly he found his rhythm late in the season and clinched his first victory at the Honda Indy 200 at Mid-Ohio and a second at the Harvest Grand Prix, increasing his streak of winning at least one race per season in IndyCar to eleven seasons. He finished the season by getting pole position in St. Petersburg but ultimately retired during the race.

=== 2021 season ===
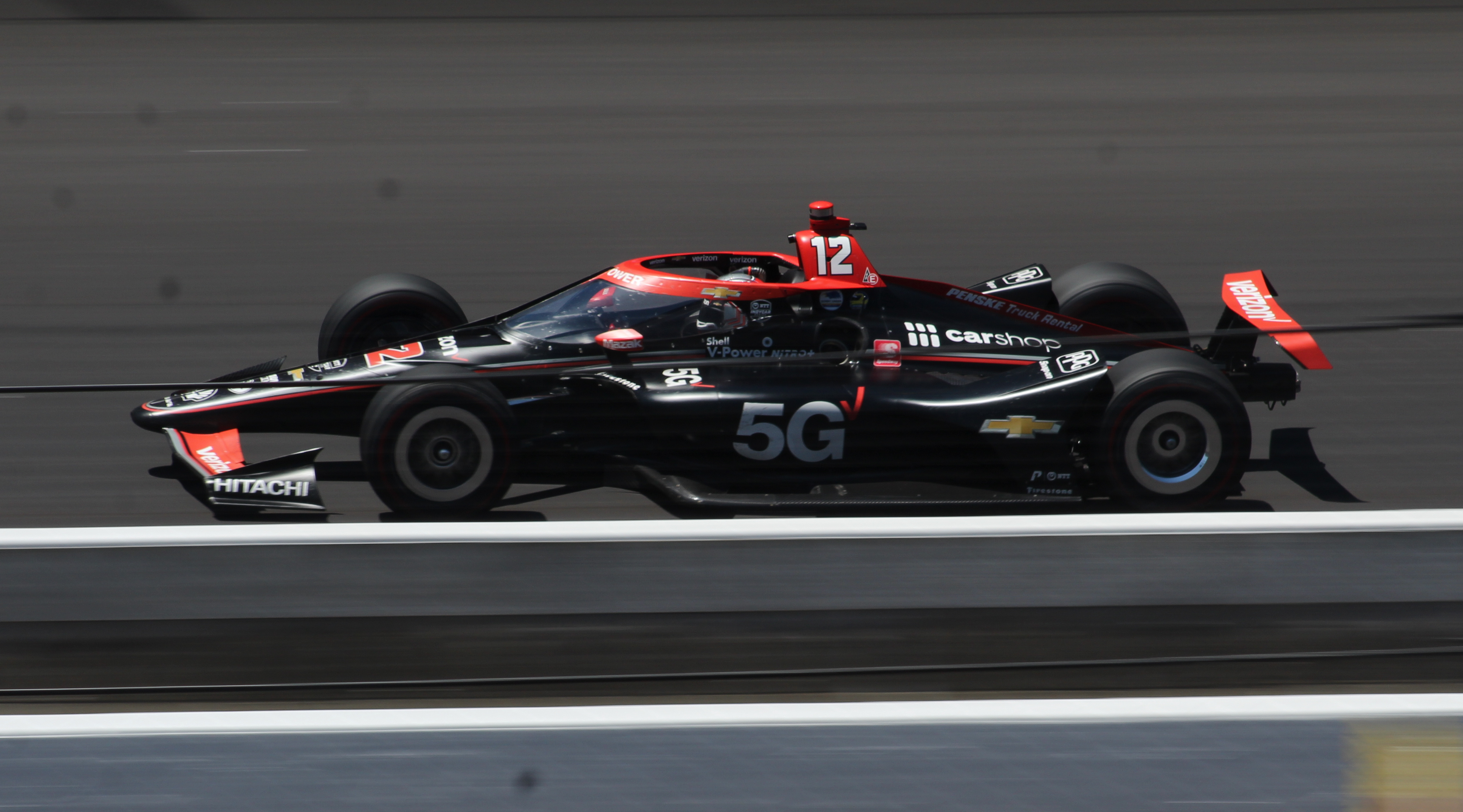
Power at the 2021 Indianapolis 500

With the departure of Helio Castroneves to Meyer Shank Racing Power became the longest-tenured member of Penske's IndyCar stable. 2021 would be one of the toughest years of Power's career and one of the toughest for Team Penske since they returned to IndyCar. Although Power scored his best opening result to the season since 2015 and was signed to a new multi-year contract with Penske that will keep him with the team through the 2023 season he struggled frequently after committing himself to a more aggressive driving style and a shake-up of crew chiefs in the Penske IndyCar paddock. Power was nearly bumped from the 105th Indianapolis 500 before managing to survive and qualify 32nd on the grid, his lowest start to date in the race and the lowest of all the Penske drivers in 2021. Power further incurred controversy during the first race in Detroit, when he led most of the race after a red flag caused by Felix Rosenqvist only to finish twentieth with five laps to go when his car's ECU overheated and prevented a restart during another red flag incident caused by Romain Grosjean, after which he blamed IndyCar for costing him the win. In Nashville Power was involved in several wheel to wheel contact incidents with teammates Simon Pagenaud and Scott McLaughlin, one of which caused a red flag. Power won his first race of 2021 at the second round on the IMS Road Course, snapping a career-long 315-day winless streak and giving Roger Penske his first win at the speedway since he purchased the facility. Power got his first pole of the season at Gateway to bring him within four of Mario Andretti's all-time IndyCar pole position record. He ultimately finished ninth in the championship.

=== 2022 season ===
2022 was a massive rebound year for Power after his difficult 2021. He started the year by scoring top five finishes in each of the first five races. He picked up his only win of the season at the final Detroit Grand Prix held on Belle Isle, redeeming himself from the previous year's misfortune. He picked up five pole positions on the season, including clinching a rare double pole position at the Iowa double header. His fifth pole position broke Mario Andretti's record for the most poles in IndyCar history. Power was one of five drivers heading into the season finale at Laguna Seca who were mathematically still in contention for the series title, holding a twenty point lead over Josef Newgarden and Scott Dixon and needing to finish no worse than third to clinch the championship. In the end, Power would come out as victorious and win the 2022 Astor Cup and 2022 Indycar Series.

=== 2023 season ===
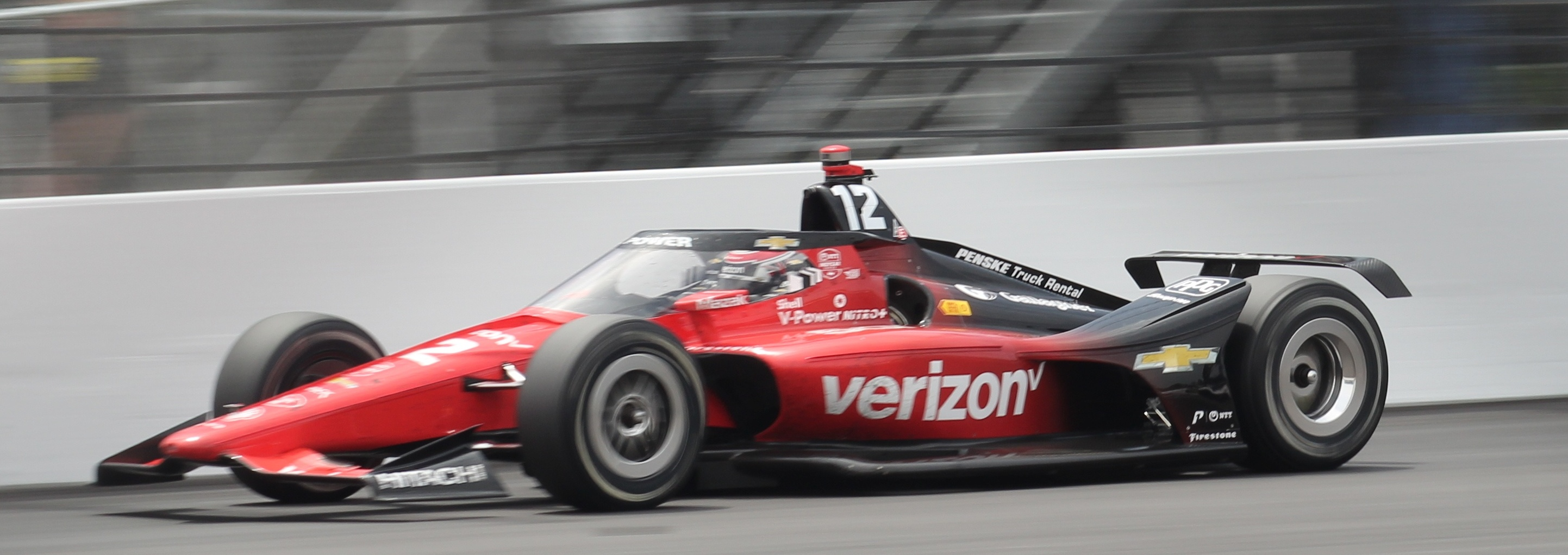
Power during the 2023 Indianapolis 500

2023 would be the most difficult season of Power's IndyCar career. He recorded only three podium finishes on the season and saw his streak of sixteen consecutive seasons with a race win snapped. Power finished 7th in the championship standings being beaten by both his teammates as Josef Newgarden finished 5th and Scott McLaughlin finished 3rd.

=== 2024 season ===
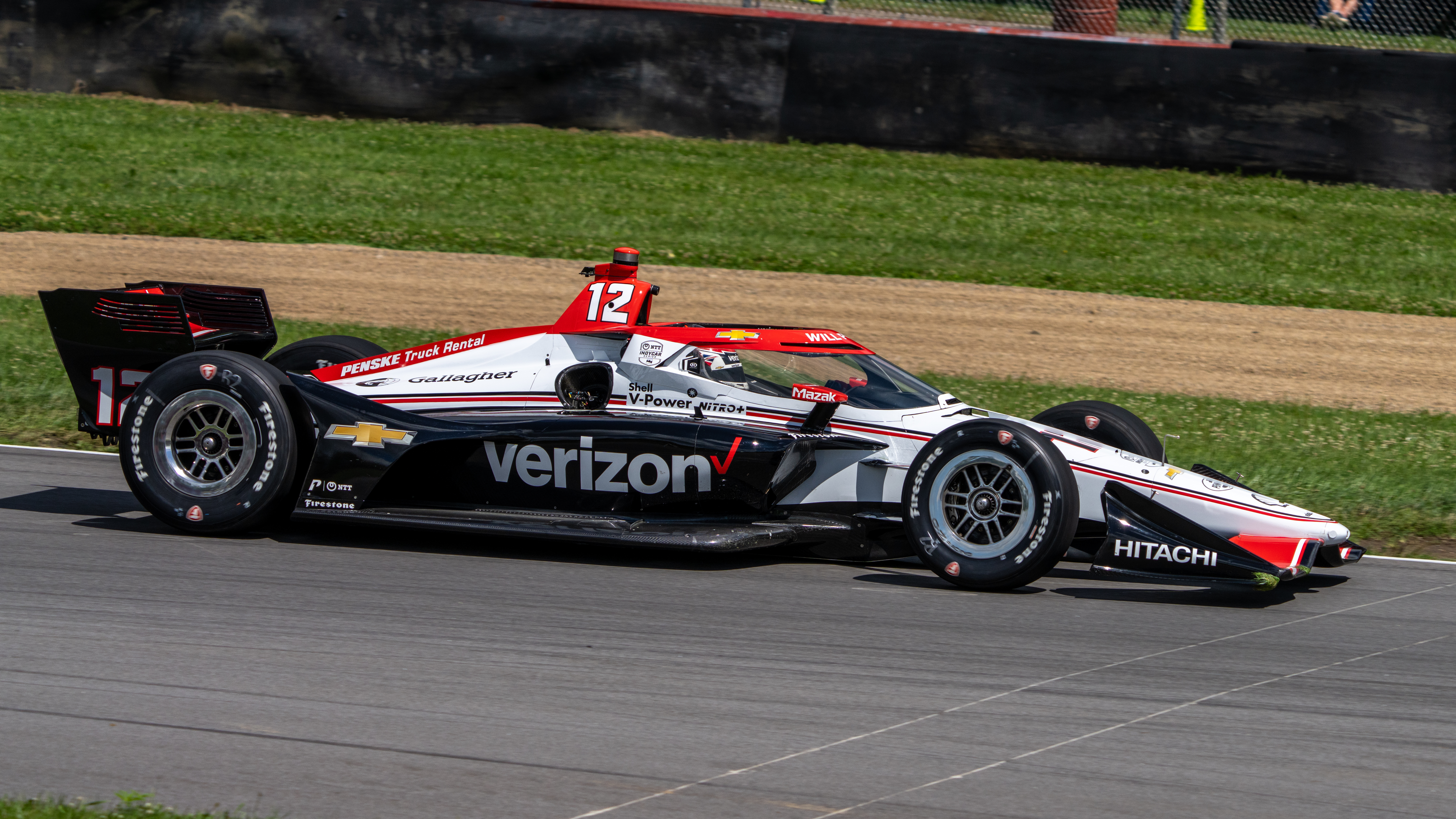
Power at Mid-Ohio in 2024

2024 would be a much stronger season for Power. He picked up three second place finishes in the first five point scoring races. Following the Indianapolis 500, Power picked up three wins on the season. He snapped his two year winless streak at Road America, picked up his first win on an oval since 2019 at the second round in Iowa, and took a third win on the season in Portland. For much of the season, Power was the main challenger to Alex Palou for the championship. Ultimately Power's run at a third title came up short in Nashville, and he finished fourth in the 2024 IndyCar Series standings.

=== 2025: Final year with Team Penske ===
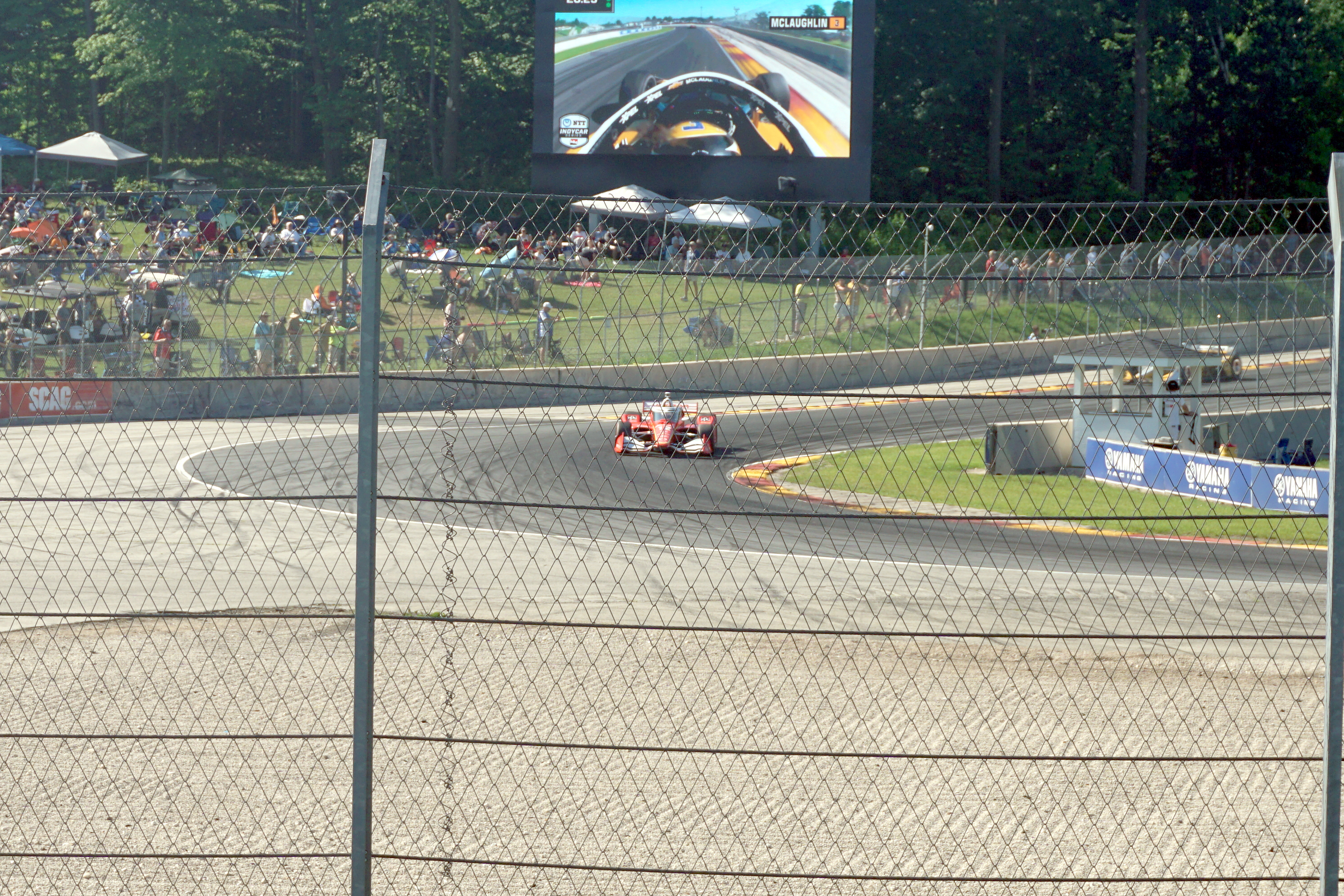
Power at the 2025 XPEL Grand Prix at Road America

Power started the 2025 season with a 26th-place DNF at St. Petersburg. With a podium at the Indy GP, the 2025 Indianapolis 500 gave issues as Power and teammate, Josef Newgarden, were the subjects of controversy during the fast-12 qualifying shootout. Before starting their qualifying attempts, Power's and Newgarden's cars were found to have illegal modified attenuators. As this violated IndyCar rules, both drivers were ordered to start the race at the back of the field, with Power ultimately starting in last place as a result. Key members of Team Penske were originally suspended for the rest of the event, before later being fired because of the scandal. Both drivers would forfeit their qualification points and were also fined $100,000.

Power would come home in nineteenth place, later promoted to sixteenth, following post race penalties being handed to Andretti driver’s Kyle Kirkwood and Marcus Ericsson and Prema driver, Callum Ilott. He was the only Penske driver to finish the race, as his teammates Scott McLaughlin crashed out on the parade laps, and Newgarden retiring because of mechanical problems. After earning a podium at Iowa, Power and Penske came through and won at Portland.

Power finished the season at Nashville with a 21st place finish, ending his season ninth in points. Two days later, Penske officials announced that Power would be leaving the team after 17 years with the team.

=== 2026: Switch to Andretti ===
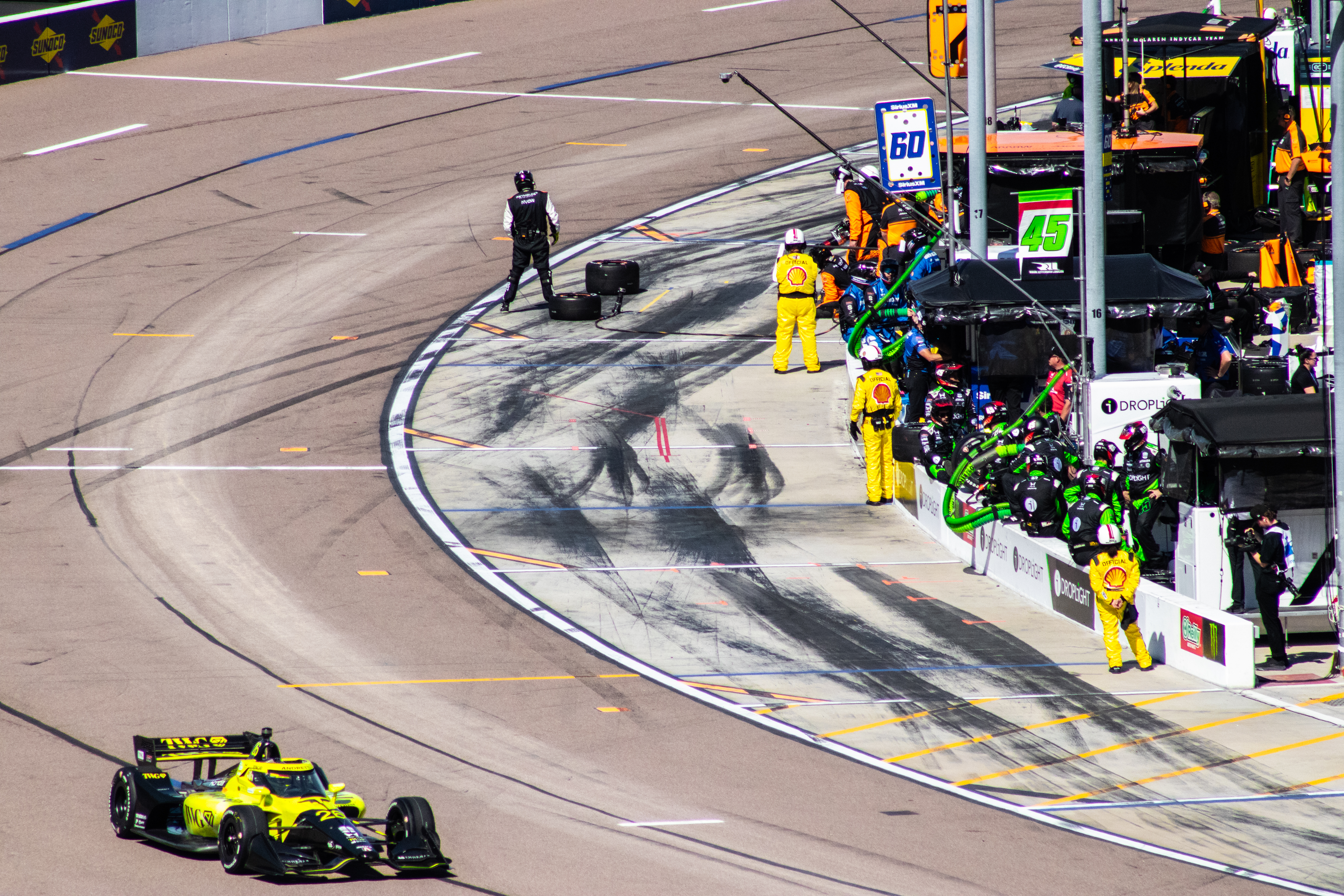
Power on pit road at Phoenix Raceway before the 2026 Good Ranchers 250.

The day after his Penske departure, Andretti Global announced they had signed Power for the 2026 season to replace the departing Colton Herta. Power started the season with a 22nd place finish at the 2026 Firestone Grand Prix of St. Petersburg after retiring on lap 55. He scored his first podium of the season at the Grand Prix of Arlington.

Power battled to his second podium at Road America, after a final lap battle and collision with Graham Rahal, after being ahead of Kyffin Simpson when the yellow flag was thrown.

Power claimed his third podium of the year at Portland, with a 3rd place finish, after qualifying third. Power and Andretti continued to ride this form, with another 3rd place at Markham, and a third in a row coming in Washington D.C. Power currently sits 10th in the points standings.

== Sports car racing ==
In 2023, Power was scheduled to make his sports car racing debut, signing on to take part in the 2023 24 Hours of Daytona with SunEnergy1 Racing. However, he would be replaced by Luca Stolz just under two weeks before the event was set to take place, as he stepped away from the ride to care for his wife after she suffered complications from a recent surgery. Power returned to the team now renamed to 75 Express at the 2025 Tirerack.com Battle of the Bricks and was announced to return to the team for the 2026 24 Hours of Daytona. Power finished second in class GTD Pro. Power and teammate Chaz Mostert drove the majority of the race, including the nearly 7 hour caution for fog.

== Personal life ==
Power's brother, Damien Power, is a stand-up comedian. Power plays the drums in his spare time, often playing the drums at charity events organised by IndyCar.

Power married Liz Cannon in 2010. The two met during Power's CART days when Liz joined Walker Racing as a receptionist and eventually worked in PR for the team. Their son was born in December 2016. In 2019, he became an American citizen.

== In popular culture ==
In 2013, Power supplied the voice for the Australian anchor in the animated feature film Turbo.

== Racing record ==
=== Karting career summary ===
Season	Series	Position
2008	All Star Karting Classic - Masters	24th
2008	200 Miles of Newcastle	53rd
2010	200 Miles of Newcastle	4th
2013	SuperNationals XVII - TaG Master	30th
2014	SuperNationals XVIII - TaG Master	**2nd**
2019	SuperNationals XXII - X30 Master	18th
2021	SuperNationals XVIV - X30 Senior	50th

=== Career summary ===
Season	Series	Team	Races	Wins	Poles	F/Laps	Podiums	Points	Position
1998	Australian Formula Ford Championship	Robert Power	4	0	0	?	1	15	19th
1999	Australian Formula Ford Championship	Robert Power	2	0	0	?	0	8	18th
2000	Australian Formula Ford Championship	Robert Power	16	0	0	?	2	94	7th
2000	Queensland Formula Ford Championship	Robert Power	12	5	3	?	12	210	**1st**
2001	Australian Formula Ford Championship	Robert Power	15	5	4	7	10	210	**2nd**
2002	Australian Drivers' Championship	Ralt Australia	12	7	2	8	11	197	**1st**
2002	Australian Formula 3 Championship	Cooltemp Pty Ltd	12	6	6	4	10	204	**2nd**
2002	V8 Supercar Championship Series	Larkham Motor Sport	2	0	0	0	0	82	45th
2003	British Formula 3 International Series	Diamond Racing	4	0	0	0	0	40	14th
2003	British Formula 3 International Series	Fortec Motorsport	14	0	0	0	1	40	14th
2004	British Formula 3 International Series	Alan Docking Racing	24	0	0	0	5	111	9th
2004	FIA European Formula 3 Cup	Alan Docking Racing	1	0	0	0	0	N/A	9th
2004	Formula One	Minardi Cosworth	Test driver						
2005	Champ Car World Series	Team Australia	2	0	0	0	0	17	22nd
2005	Formula Renault 3.5 Series	Carlin Motorsport	14	2	3	0	4	64	7th
2005-06	A1 Grand Prix	A1 Team Australia	2	0	0	0	1	51‡	13th‡
2006	Champ Car World Series	Team Australia	14	0	1	1	1	213	6th
2007	Champ Car World Series	Team Australia	14	2	5	1	5	262	4th
2008	IndyCar Series	KV Racing Technology	17	1	0	1	1	331	12th
2008	Nikon Indy 300	KV Racing Technology	1	0	1	0	0	N/A	22nd
2009	IndyCar Series	Penske Racing	6	1	2	0	3	215	19th
2010	IndyCar Series	Team Penske	17	5	8	4	9	597	**2nd**
2010	V8 Supercar Championship Series	Ford Performance Racing	2	0	0	0	0	0	NC†
2011	IndyCar Series	Team Penske	16	6	8	2	9	555	**2nd**
2012	IndyCar Series	Team Penske	15	3	5	3	6	465	**2nd**
2012	International V8 Supercars Championship	Ford Performance Racing	2	0	0	0	2	0	NC†
2013	IndyCar Series	Team Penske	19	3	3	3	4	498	4th
2014	IndyCar Series	Team Penske	18	3	4	2	7	671	**1st**
2015	IndyCar Series	Team Penske	16	1	6	2	3	493	**3rd**
2016	IndyCar Series	Team Penske	15	4	2	2	7	532	**2nd**
2017	IndyCar Series	Team Penske	17	3	6	2	7	562	5th
2018	IndyCar Series	Team Penske	17	3	4	3	8	582	**3rd**
2019	IndyCar Series	Team Penske	17	2	3	2	6	550	5th
2020	IndyCar Series	Team Penske	14	2	5	0	5	396	5th
2021	IndyCar Series	Team Penske	16	1	1	1	4	357	9th
2022	IndyCar Series	Team Penske	17	1	5	2	9	560	**1st**
2023	IndyCar Series	Team Penske	17	0	2	3	4	425	7th
2024	IndyCar Series	Team Penske	17	3	0	0	7	498	4th
2025	IndyCar Series	Team Penske	17	1	1	1	3	357	9th
2026	IMSA SportsCar Championship - GTD Pro	75 Express	1	0	0	0	1	350	32nd
2026	IndyCar Series	Andretti Global	18	0	0	2	5	368	11th

† As he was a guest driver, Power was ineligible to score points.

‡ Team standings.

* Season still in progress

=== Complete British Formula Three Championship results ===
(key) (Races in bold indicate pole position)

Year	Entrant	Chassis	Engine	1	2	3	4	5	6	7	8	9	10	11	12	13	14	15	16	17	18	19	20	21	22	23	24	25	DC	Points
2003	Diamond Racing	Ralt F303	Mugen-Honda	DON; 1; 17	DON; 2; 23	SNE; 1 Ret	SNE; 2; 19	CRO; 1	CRO; 2	KNO; 1	KNO; 2	SIL; 1	SIL; 2																14th	40
2003	Fortec Motorsport	Dallara F303	Renault Sodemo											CAS; 1; 5	CAS; 2; 12	OUL; 1; 12	OUL; 2; 9	ROC; 1; 5	ROC; 2; 15	THR; 1 Ret	THR; 2; 2	SPA; 1; 4	SPA; 2; 17	DON; 1 Ret	DON; 2; 11	BRH; 1; 23	BRH; 2; 17		14th	40
2004	Alan Docking Racing	Dallara F304	Mugen-Honda	DON; 1 Ret	DON; 2; 4	SIL; 1; 2	SIL; 2 C	CRO; 1; 15	CRO; 2 Ret	KNO; 1; 2	KNO; 2; 2	SNE; 1; 10	SNE; 2; 3	SNE; 3; 3	CAS; 1; 6	CAS; 2; 13	DON; 1 Ret	DON; 2; 10	OUL; 1; 12	OUL; 2 Ret	SIL; 1; 4	SIL; 2; 6	THR; 1; 10	THR; 2; 18	SPA; 1; 8	SPA; 2; 9	BRH; 1 Ret	BRH; 2; 9	9th	111

=== Complete Formula Renault 3.5 Series results ===
(key) (Races in bold indicate pole position)

Year	Entrant	1	2	3	4	5	6	7	8	9	10	11	12	13	14	15	16	17	DC	Points
2005	Carlin Motorsport	ZOL; 1 DNS	**ZOL**; **2** DNS	MON; 1; 12	VAL; 1; 3	VAL; 2; 14	LMS; 1; 4	LMS; 2; 1	BIL; 1; 2	**BIL**; **2**; 1	**OSC**; **1** Ret	OSC; 2; 14	DON; 1; 13	DON; 2 Ret	EST; 1; 10	EST; 2; 12	MNZ; 1	MNZ; 2	7th	64

=== Complete A1 Grand Prix results ===
(key) (Races in bold indicate pole position) (Races in italics indicate fastest lap)

Year	Entrant	1	2	3	4	5	6	7	8	9	10	11	12	13	14	15	16	17	18	19	20	21	22	DC	Points
2005–06	Australia	GBR; SPR; 4	GBR; FEA; 2	GER; SPR	GER; FEA	POR; SPR	POR; FEA	AUS; SPR	AUS; FEA	MYS; SPR	MYS; FEA	UAE; SPR	UAE; FEA	RSA; SPR	RSA; FEA	IDN; SPR	IDN; FEA	MEX; SPR	MEX; FEA	USA; SPR	USA; FEA	CHN; SPR	CHN; FEA	**13th**	**51**

=== American open-wheel racing results ===
(key)

==== Champ Car ====
Year	Team	No.	Chassis	Engine	1	2	3	4	5	6	7	8	9	10	11	12	13	14	Rank	Points	Ref
2005	Walker Racing	25	Lola B02/00	Ford XFE	LBH	MTY	MIL	POR	CLE	TOR	EDM	SJO	DEN	MTL	LVS	SRF; 15			22nd	17	
2005	Walker Racing	5	Lola B02/00	Ford XFE													MXC; 10		22nd	17	
2006	Walker Racing	5	Lola B02/00	Ford XFE	LBH; 9	HOU; 7	MTY; 11	MIL; 11	POR; 18	CLE; 9	TOR; 7	EDM; 6	SJO; 6	DEN; 4	MTL; 5	ROA; 13	**SRF**; 12	MXC; 3	6th	213	
2007	Walker Racing	5	Panoz DP01	Cosworth XFE	**LVG**; 1	LBH; 3	**HOU**; 11	POR; 4	CLE; 10	MTT; 3	TOR; 1	**EDM**; 15	SJO; 4	ROA; 16	ZOL; 4	ASN; 14	**SRF**; 16	**MXC**; 2	4th	262	

==== IndyCar Series ====
IndyCar Series results
Year	Team	No.	Chassis	Engine	1	2	3	4	5	6	7	8	9	10	11	12	13	14	15	16	17	18	19	Rank	Points	Ref
2008	KV Racing Technology	8	Dallara IR5	Honda	HMS; 25	STP; 8	MOT; DNP		KAN; 27	INDY; 13	MIL; 14	TXS; 13	IOW; 9	RIR; 25	WGL; 15	NSH; 11	MOH; 4	EDM; 22	KTY; 26	SNM; 25	DET; 8	CHI; 5		12th	331	
2008	KV Racing Technology	8	Panoz DP01	Cosworth				LBH; 1																12th	331	
2009	Penske Racing	3	Dallara IR05	Honda	STP; 6																			19th	215	
2009	Penske Racing	12	Dallara IR05	Honda		**LBH**; 2	KAN	INDY; 5	MIL	TXS	IOW	RIR	WGL	TOR; 3	**EDM**; 1	KTY; 9	MOH	SNM; Wth	CHI	MOT	HMS			19th	215	
2010	Team Penske	12	Dallara IR05	Honda	SAO; 1	**STP**; 1	**ALA**; 4	**LBH**; 3	KAN; 12	INDY; 8	TXS; 14	**IOW**; 5	**WGL**; 1	TOR; 1	**EDM**; 2	**MOH**; 2	**SNM**; 1	CHI; 16	KTY; 8	MOT; 3	HMS; 25			2nd	597	
2011	Team Penske	12	Dallara IR05	Honda	**STP**; 2	**ALA**; 1	**LBH**; 10	**SAO**; 1	INDY; 14	TXS; 3	TXS; 1	MIL; 4	IOW; 21	**TOR**; 24	EDM; 1	MOH; 14	NHM; 5	**SNM**; 1	**BAL**; 1	MOT; 2	**KTY**; 19	LVS^{1} C		2nd	555	
2012	Team Penske	12	Dallara DW12	Chevrolet	**STP**; 7	ALA; 1	LBH; 1	**SAO**; 1	INDY; 28	DET; 4	TXS; 8	MIL; 12	IOW; 24	TOR; 15	EDM; 3	**MOH**; 2	**SNM**; 2	**BAL**; 6	FON; 24					2nd	465	
2013	Team Penske	12	Dallara DW12	Chevrolet	**STP**; 16	ALA; 5	LBH; 16	SAO; 24	INDY; 19	DET; 8	DET; 20	**TXS**; 7	MIL; 3	IOW; 17	POC; 4	TOR; 15	TOR; 18	MOH; 4	SNM; 1	BAL; 18	HOU; 12	HOU; 1	**FON**; 1	4th	498	
2014	Team Penske	12	Dallara DW12	Chevrolet	STP; 1	LBH; 2	**ALA**; 5	IMS; 8	INDY; 8	DET; 1	DET; 2	**TXS**; 2	HOU; 14	HOU; 11	POC; 10	IOW; 14	TOR; 9	TOR; 3	MOH; 6	**MIL**; 1	**SNM**; 10	FON; 9		1st	671	
2015	Team Penske	1	Dallara DW12	Chevrolet	**STP**; 2	NLA; 7	LBH; 20	ALA; 4	**IMS**; 1	INDY; 2	**DET**; 4	DET; 18	**TXS**; 13	**TOR**; 4	FON; 19	MIL; 22	IOW; 10	MOH; 14	POC; 4	**SNM**; 7				3rd	493	
2016	Team Penske	12	Dallara DW12	Chevrolet	**STP**; Wth	PHX; 3	LBH; 7	ALA; 4	IMS; 19	INDY; 10	DET; 20	DET; 1	**ROA**; 1	IOW; 2	TOR; 1	MOH; 2	POC; 1	TXS; 8	WGL; 20	SNM; 20				2nd	532	
2017	Team Penske	12	Dallara DW12	Chevrolet	**STP**; 19	LBH; 13	**ALA**; 14	PHX; 2	**IMS**; 1	INDY; 23	DET; 18	DET; 3	TXS; 1	ROA; 5	**IOW**; 4	TOR; 21	**MOH**; 2	POC; 1	**GTW**; 20	WGL; 6	SNM; 3			5th	562	
2018	Team Penske	12	Dallara DW12	Chevrolet	STP; 10	PHX; 22	LBH; 2	ALA; 21	**IMS**; 1	INDY; 1	DET; 7	DET; 2	TXS; 18	ROA; 23	**IOW**; 6	TOR; 18	MOH; 3	**POC**; 2	GTW; 1	**POR**; 21	SNM; 3			3rd	582	
2019	Team Penske	12	Dallara DW12	Chevrolet	**STP**; 3	**COA**; 24	ALA; 11	LBH; 7	IMS; 7	INDY; 5	DET; 18	DET; 3	TXS; 9	ROA; 2	TOR; 18	IOW; 15	**MOH**; 4	POC; 1	GTW; 22	POR; 1	LAG; 2			5th	550	
2020	Team Penske	12	Dallara DW12	Chevrolet	TXS; 13	**IMS**; 20	ROA; 2	ROA; 11	IOW; 21	IOW; 2	INDY; 14	**GTW**; 17	GTW; 3	**MOH**; 1	MOH; 7	IMS; 6	**IMS**; 1	**STP**; 24						5th	396	
2021	Team Penske	12	Dallara DW12	Chevrolet	ALA; 2	STP; 8	TXS; 14	TXS; 13	IMS; 11	INDY; 30	DET; 20	DET; 6	ROA; 3	MOH; 25	NSH; 14	IMS; 1	**GTW**; 3	POR; 13	LAG; 26	LBH; 10				9th	357	
2022	Team Penske	12	Dallara DW12	Chevrolet	STP; 3	TXS; 4	LBH; 4	ALA; 4	**IMS**; 3	INDY; 15	DET; 1	ROA; 19	MOH; 3	TOR; 15	**IOW**; 3	**IOW**; 2	IMS; 3	NSH; 11	**GTW**; 6	POR; 2	**LAG**; 3			1st	560	
2023	Team Penske	12	Dallara DW12	Chevrolet	STP; 7	TXS; 16	LBH; 6	ALA; 3	IMS; 12	INDY; 23	DET; 2	ROA; 13	MOH; 3	TOR; 14	**IOW**; 5	**IOW**; 2	NSH; 10	IMS; 6	GTW; 9	POR; 25	LAG; 4			7th	425	
2024	Team Penske	12	Dallara DW12	Chevrolet	STP; 2	THE; DNQ	LBH; 6	ALA; 2	IMS; 2	INDY; 24	DET; 6	ROA; 1	LAG; 7	MOH; 11	IOW; 18	IOW; 1	TOR; 12	GTW; 18	POR; 1	MIL; 2	MIL; 10	NSH; 24		4th	498	
2025	Team Penske	12	Dallara DW12	Chevrolet	STP; 26	THE; 6	LBH; 5	ALA; 5	IMS; 3	INDY; 16	DET; 4	**GTW**; 27	ROA; 14	MOH; 26	IOW; 3	IOW; 24	TOR; 11	LAG; 7	POR; 1*	MIL; 26	NSH; 21			9th	357	
2026	Andretti Global	26	Dallara DW12	Honda	STP; 22	PHX; 16	ARL; 3	ALA; 12	LBH; 19	IMS; 13	INDY; 29	DET; 22	GTW; 8	ROA; 3	MOH; 6	NSH; 20	POR; 3	MRK; 3	WSH; 3	MIL; 25	MIL; 14	LAG; 13		11th	368	

- ^{1} The Las Vegas Indy 300 was abandoned after Dan Wheldon died from injuries sustained in a 15-car crash on lap 11.

==== Indianapolis 500 ====
Year	Chassis	Engine	Start	Finish	Team
2008	Dallara	Honda	23	13	KV Racing Technology
2009	Dallara	Honda	9	5	Team Penske
2010	Dallara	Honda	2	8	Team Penske
2011	Dallara	Honda	5	14	Team Penske
2012	Dallara	Chevrolet	5	28	Team Penske
2013	Dallara	Chevrolet	6	19	Team Penske
2014	Dallara	Chevrolet	3	8	Team Penske
2015	Dallara	Chevrolet	2	2	Team Penske
2016	Dallara	Chevrolet	6	10	Team Penske
2017	Dallara	Chevrolet	9	23	Team Penske
2018	Dallara	Chevrolet	3	**1**	Team Penske
2019	Dallara	Chevrolet	6	5	Team Penske
2020	Dallara	Chevrolet	22	14	Team Penske
2021	Dallara	Chevrolet	32	30	Team Penske
2022	Dallara	Chevrolet	11	15	Team Penske
2023	Dallara	Chevrolet	12	23	Team Penske
2024	Dallara	Chevrolet	2	24	Team Penske
2025	Dallara	Chevrolet	33	16	Team Penske
2026	Dallara	Honda	19	29	Andretti Global

=== Complete V8 Supercar results ===
Year	Team	1	2	3	4	5	6	7	8	9	10	11	12	13	14	15	16	17	18	19	20	21	22	23	24	25	26	27	28	29	30	31	Final pos	Points
2002	Larkham Motor Sport	ADE; R1	ADE; R2	PHI; R3	PHI; R4	EAS; R5	EAS; R6	EAS; R7	HID; R8	HID; R9	HID; R10	CAN; R11	CAN; R12	CAN; R13	BAR; R14	BAR; R15	BAR; R16	ORA; R17	ORA; R18	WIN; R19	WIN; R20	QLD; R21; 11	BAT; R22; 18	SUR; R23	SUR; R24	PUK; R25	PUK; R26	PUK; R27	SAN; R28	SAN; R29			46th	82
2010	Ford Performance Racing	YMC; R1	YMC; R2	BHR; R3	BHR; R4	ADE; R5	ADE; R6	HAM; R7	HAM; R8	QLD; R9	QLD; R10	WIN; R11	WIN; R12	HID; R13	HID; R14	TOW; R15	TOW; R16	PHI; Q	PHI; R17	BAT; R18	SUR; R19; Ret	SUR; R20; 13	SYM; R21	SYM; R22	SAN; R23	SAN; R24	SYD; R25	SYD; R26					NC	0 †
2012	Ford Performance Racing	ADE; R1	ADE; R2	SYM; R3	SYM; R4	HAM; R5	HAM; R6	BAR; R7	BAR; R8	BAR; R9	PHI; R10	PHI; R11	HID; R12	HID; R13	TOW; R14	TOW; R15	QLD; R16	QLD; R17	SMP; R18	SMP; R19	SAN; Q	SAN; R20	BAT; R21	SUR; R22; 3	SUR; R23; 3	YMC; R24	YMC; R25	YMC; R26	WIN; R27	WIN; R28	SYD; R29	SYD; R30	NC	0 †

† Not Eligible for points

=== Complete Bathurst 1000 results ===
Year	Team	Car	Co-driver	Position	Laps
2002	Larkham Motor Sport	Ford AU Falcon	(Australia) Mark Larkham	18th	157

=== Bathurst 24 Hour results ===
Year	Team	Co-drivers	Car	Class	Laps	Overall position	Class position
2003	(Australia) Scuderia Prancing Horse Racing	(Australia) Des Wall (Australia) Paul Freestone (Australia) James Koundouris	Porsche 996 GT3-RS	A	474	DNF	DNF

=== Complete Indianapolis 8 Hour results ===
Year	Team	Co-drivers	Car	Class	Laps	Overall position	Class position
2025	(Australia) 75 Express	(Australia) Kenny Habul (Australia) Chaz Mostert	Mercedes-AMG GT3 Evo	Pro-Am	198	6th	6th

=== Complete Daytona 24 Hour results ===
Year	Team	Co-drivers	Car	Class	Laps	Overall position	Class position
2026	(Australia) 75 Express	(Australia) Kenny Habul (Germany) Maro Engel (Australia) Chaz Mostert	Mercedes-AMG GT3 Evo	GTDPro	662	20th	**2nd**

Sporting positions
Preceded by Rick Kelly	Australian Drivers' Championship; Champion; 2002	Succeeded by Daniel Gaunt
Preceded by Timo Glock	Champ Car; Rookie of the Year; 2006	Succeeded by Robert Doornbos
Preceded by Not awarded	Winner of the IndyCar Series; Mario Andretti Road Course Trophy; 2010–2012	Succeeded by Scott Dixon
Preceded by Scott Dixon	IndyCar Series; Champion; 2014	Succeeded by Scott Dixon
Preceded by Scott Dixon	Winner of the IndyCar Series; Mario Andretti Road Course Trophy; 2014–2015	Succeeded by Simon Pagenaud
Preceded by Takuma Sato	Indianapolis 500 Winner; 2018	Succeeded by Simon Pagenaud
Preceded by Álex Palou	IndyCar Series; Champion; 2022	Succeeded by Álex Palou
Awards and achievements
Preceded by Matt Campbell	Sir Jack Brabham Award; 2018	Succeeded by Oscar Piastri
Preceded by Ben Atkinson with Cody Crocker	Sir Jack Brabham Award; 2007	Succeeded by Mark Webber; 2009
