= 2022 Honda Indy 200 =

Indycar race held in Lexington, Ohio

(United States) 2022 Honda Indy 200
Race details
9th round of the 2022 IndyCar season
← Previous race	Next race →
- Date: July 3, 2022
- Official name: Honda Indy 200
- Location: Mid-Ohio Sports Car Course, Lexington, Ohio
- Course: Permanent road course 2.258 mi / 3.634 km
- Distance: 80 laps 180.64 mi / 290.71 km

Pole position
- Driver: (Mexico) Pato O'Ward (Arrow McLaren SP)
- Time: 01:06.7054

Fastest lap
- Driver: (Spain) Álex Palou (Chip Ganassi Racing)
- Time: 01:08.3376 (on lap 29 of 80)

Podium
- First: (New Zealand) Scott McLaughlin (Team Penske)
- Second: (Spain) Álex Palou (Chip Ganassi Racing)
- Third: (Australia) Will Power (Team Penske)

The 2022 Honda Indy 200 was the ninth round of the 2022 IndyCar season. The race was held on July 3, 2022, in Lexington, Ohio at the Mid-Ohio Sports Car Course. The race consisted of 80 laps and was won by Scott McLaughlin.

== Entry list ==
Key	Meaning
R	Rookie
W	Past winner

No.	Driver	Team	Engine
2	(United States) Josef Newgarden W	Team Penske	Chevrolet
3	(New Zealand) Scott McLaughlin	Team Penske	Chevrolet
4	(Canada) Dalton Kellett	A. J. Foyt Enterprises	Chevrolet
5	(Mexico) Patricio O'Ward	Arrow McLaren SP	Chevrolet
06	(Brazil) Hélio Castroneves W	Meyer Shank Racing	Honda
7	(Sweden) Felix Rosenqvist	Arrow McLaren SP	Chevrolet
8	(Sweden) Marcus Ericsson	Chip Ganassi Racing	Honda
9	(New Zealand) Scott Dixon W	Chip Ganassi Racing	Honda
10	(Spain) Álex Palou	Chip Ganassi Racing	Honda
11	(Colombia) Tatiana Calderón R	A. J. Foyt Enterprises	Chevrolet
12	(Australia) Will Power W	Team Penske	Chevrolet
14	(United States) Kyle Kirkwood R	A. J. Foyt Enterprises	Chevrolet
15	(United States) Graham Rahal W	Rahal Letterman Lanigan Racing	Honda
16	(Switzerland) Simona de Silvestro	Paretta Autosport	Chevrolet
18	(United States) David Malukas R	Dale Coyne Racing with HMD Motorsports	Honda
20	(United States) Conor Daly	Ed Carpenter Racing	Chevrolet
21	(Netherlands) Rinus VeeKay	Ed Carpenter Racing	Chevrolet
26	(United States) Colton Herta W	Andretti Autosport	Honda
27	(United States) Alexander Rossi W	Andretti Autosport	Honda
28	(France) Romain Grosjean	Andretti Autosport	Honda
29	(Canada) Devlin DeFrancesco R	Andretti Steinbrenner Autosport	Honda
30	(Denmark) Christian Lundgaard R	Rahal Letterman Lanigan Racing	Honda
45	(United Kingdom) Jack Harvey	Rahal Letterman Lanigan Racing	Honda
48	(United States) Jimmie Johnson	Chip Ganassi Racing	Honda
51	(Japan) Takuma Sato	Dale Coyne Racing with Rick Ware Racing	Honda
60	(France) Simon Pagenaud W	Meyer Shank Racing	Honda
77	(United Kingdom) Callum Ilott R	Juncos Hollinger Racing	Chevrolet

== Practice ==
=== Practice 1 ===
Top Practice Speeds
Pos	No.	Driver	Team	Engine	Lap Time
1	2	(United States) Josef Newgarden W	Team Penske	Chevrolet	01:07.0549
2	10	(Spain) Álex Palou	Chip Ganassi Racing	Honda	01:07.2610
3	7	(Sweden) Felix Rosenqvist	Arrow McLaren SP	Chevrolet	01:07.3171

=== Practice 2 ===
Top Practice Speeds
Pos	No.	Driver	Team	Engine	Lap Time
1	26	(United States) Colton Herta W	Andretti Autosport with Curb-Agajanian	Honda	01:07.0275
2	12	(Australia) Will Power W	Team Penske	Chevrolet	01:07.0309
3	2	(United States) Josef Newgarden W	Team Penske	Chevrolet	01:07.0614

== Qualifying ==
=== Qualifying classification ===
Pos	No.	Driver	Team	Engine	Time				Final grid
Pos	No.	Driver	Team	Engine	Round 1		Round 2	Round 3	Final grid
Pos	No.	Driver	Team	Engine	Group 1	Group 2	Round 2	Round 3	Final grid
1	5	(Mexico) Pato O'Ward	Arrow McLaren SP	Chevrolet	N/A	01:06.7616	01:06.7504	**01:06.7054**	1
2	3	(New Zealand) Scott McLaughlin	Team Penske	Chevrolet	**01:06.5897**	N/A	**01:06.5341**	01:06.8382	2
3	26	(United States) Colton Herta **W**	Andretti Autosport with Curb-Agajanian	Honda	N/A	01:07.0058	01:06.7953	01:07.0262	3
4	7	(Sweden) Felix Rosenqvist	Arrow McLaren SP	Chevrolet	N/A	**01:06.5379**	01:06.5438	01:07.2163	4
5	9	(New Zealand) Scott Dixon **W**	Chip Ganassi Racing	Honda	N/A	01:07.0347	01:06.7946	01:07.4047	5
6	60	(France) Simon Pagenaud **W**	Meyer Shank Racing	Honda	01:06.9474	N/A	01:06.7955	01:07.4199	6
7	10	(Spain) Álex Palou	Chip Ganassi Racing	Honda	N/A	01:07.1155	01:06.7965	N/A	7
8	18	(United States) David Malukas **R**	Dale Coyne Racing with HMD Motorsports	Honda	01:06.9932	N/A	01:06.8201	N/A	8
9	14	(United States) Kyle Kirkwood **R**	A. J. Foyt Enterprises	Chevrolet	N/A	01:07.2377	01:06.9506	N/A	9
10	77	(United Kingdom) Callum Ilott **R**	Juncos Hollinger Racing	Chevrolet	01:06.9627	N/A	01:06.9534	N/A	10
11	21	(Netherlands) Rinus VeeKay	Ed Carpenter Racing	Chevrolet	01:06.8191	N/A	01:06.9843	N/A	11
12	27	(United States) Alexander Rossi **W**	Andretti Autosport	Honda	01:06.9501	N/A	01:07.0155	N/A	12
13	8	(Sweden) Marcus Ericsson	Chip Ganassi Racing	Honda	01:07.1475	N/A	N/A	N/A	13
14	2	(United States) Josef Newgarden **W**	Team Penske	Chevrolet	N/A	01:07.3338	N/A	N/A	14
15	06	(Brazil) Hélio Castroneves **W**	Meyer Shank Racing	Honda	01:07.1798	N/A	N/A	N/A	15
16	30	(Denmark) Christian Lundgaard **R**	Rahal Letterman Lanigan Racing	Honda	N/A	01:07.4207	N/A	N/A	16
17	28	(France) Romain Grosjean	Andretti Autosport	Honda	01:07.2573	N/A	N/A	N/A	17
18	15	(United States) Graham Rahal **W**	Rahal Letterman Lanigan Racing	Honda	N/A	01:07.5909	N/A	N/A	18
19	51	(Japan) Takuma Sato	Dale Coyne Racing with Rick Ware Racing	Honda	01:07.4645	N/A	N/A	N/A	19
20	29	(Canada) Devlin DeFrancesco **R**	Andretti Steinbrenner Autosport	Honda	N/A	01:07.6475	N/A	N/A	20
21	12	(Australia) Will Power **W**	Team Penske	Chevrolet	01:07.5559	N/A	N/A	N/A	21
22	20	(United States) Conor Daly	Ed Carpenter Racing	Chevrolet	N/A	01:07.6745	N/A	N/A	22
23	4	(Canada) Dalton Kellett	A. J. Foyt Enterprises	Chevrolet	01:08.2444	N/A	N/A	N/A	23
24	45	(United Kingdom) Jack Harvey	Rahal Letterman Lanigan Racing	Honda	N/A	01:07.9362	N/A	N/A	24
25	16	(Switzerland) Simona de Silvestro	Paretta Autosport	Chevrolet	01:08.4995	N/A	N/A	N/A	25
26	11	(Colombia) Tatiana Calderón **R**	A. J. Foyt Enterprises	Chevrolet	N/A	01:08.4370	N/A	N/A	26
27	48	(United States) Jimmie Johnson	Chip Ganassi Racing	Honda	N/A	01:08.5318	N/A	N/A	27

Notes

- **Bold text** indicates fastest time set in session.

== Warmup ==
Top Warmup Speeds
Pos	No.	Driver	Team	Engine	Lap Time
1	18	(United States) David Malukas R	Dale Coyne Racing with HMD Motorsports	Honda	01:07.7110
2	10	(Spain) Álex Palou	Chip Ganassi Racing	Honda	01:07.9649
3	8	(Sweden) Marcus Ericsson	Chip Ganassi Racing	Honda	01:07.9714

== Race ==
The race started at 12:53 PM ET on July 3, 2022.

=== Race classification ===
Pos	No.	Driver	Team	Engine	Laps	Time/Retired	Pit Stops	Grid	Laps Led	Pts.
1	3	(New Zealand) Scott McLaughlin	Team Penske	Chevrolet	80	01:46:43.3290	2	2	45	53
2	10	(Spain) Álex Palou	Chip Ganassi Racing	Honda	80	+0.5512	2	7		40
3	12	(Australia) Will Power W	Team Penske	Chevrolet	80	+3.8415	3	21		35
4	21	(Netherlands) Rinus VeeKay	Ed Carpenter Racing	Chevrolet	80	+11.3742	2	11		32
5	9	(New Zealand) Scott Dixon W	Chip Ganassi Racing	Honda	80	+12.3194	2	5		30
6	8	(Sweden) Marcus Ericsson	Chip Ganassi Racing	Honda	80	+13.0700	2	13		28
7	2	(United States) Josef Newgarden W	Team Penske	Chevrolet	80	+13.7717	2	14		26
8	06	(Brazil) Hélio Castroneves W	Meyer Shank Racing	Honda	80	+16.8590	2	15		24
9	18	(United States) David Malukas R	Dale Coyne Racing with HMD Motorsports	Honda	80	+19.0958	2	8		22
10	60	(France) Simon Pagenaud W	Meyer Shank Racing	Honda	80	+26.1914	2	6		20
11	30	(Denmark) Christian Lundgaard R	Rahal Letterman Lanigan Racing	Honda	80	+27.0849	2	16		19
12	15	(United States) Graham Rahal W	Rahal Letterman Lanigan Racing	Honda	80	+28.9183	3	18		18
13	20	(United States) Conor Daly	Ed Carpenter Racing	Chevrolet	80	+29.4121	2	22		17
14	51	(Japan) Takuma Sato	Dale Coyne Racing with Rick Ware Racing	Honda	80	+29.7488	2	19		16
15	26	(United States) Colton Herta W	Andretti Autosport with Curb-Agajanian	Honda	80	+35.6803	2	3	7	16
16	48	(United States) Jimmie Johnson	Chip Ganassi Racing	Honda	80	+36.6512	2	27		14
17	29	(Canada) Devlin DeFrancesco R	Andretti Steinbrenner Autosport	Honda	80	+39.6556	2	20		13
18	16	(Switzerland) Simona de Silvestro	Paretta Autosport	Chevrolet	80	+46.0278	3	25		12
19	27	(United States) Alexander Rossi W	Andretti Autosport	Honda	80	+46.9341	4	12		11
20	45	(United Kingdom) Jack Harvey	Rahal Letterman Lanigan Racing	Honda	80	+1:05.0242	6	24		10
21	28	(France) Romain Grosjean	Andretti Autosport	Honda	79	+1 Lap	3	17		9
22	4	(Canada) Dalton Kellett	A. J. Foyt Enterprises	Chevrolet	78	+2 Laps	3	23		8
23	77	(United Kingdom) Callum Ilott R	Juncos Hollinger Racing	Chevrolet	57	Engine	2	10		7
24	5	(Mexico) Pato O'Ward	Arrow McLaren SP	Chevrolet	52	Fuel System	1	1	28	8
25	11	(Colombia) Tatiana Calderón R	A. J. Foyt Enterprises	Chevrolet	51	Gearbox	1	26		5
26	14	(United States) Kyle Kirkwood R	A. J. Foyt Enterprises	Chevrolet	28	Accident	1	9		5
27	7	(Sweden) Felix Rosenqvist	Arrow McLaren SP	Chevrolet	8	Engine		4		5
Fastest lap: (Spain) Álex Palou (Chip Ganassi Racing) – 01:08.3376 (lap 29)

== Championship standings after the race ==
Drivers' Championship standings

	Pos.	Driver	Points
Unchanged	1	(Sweden) Marcus Ericsson	321
Unchanged	2	(Australia) Will Power	301
Unchanged	3	(United States) Josef Newgarden	287
1	4	(Spain) Álex Palou	286
1	5	(Mexico) Pato O'Ward	256

Engine manufacturer standings

	Pos.	Manufacturer	Points
Unchanged	1	Chevrolet	769
Unchanged	2	Honda	688

- Note: Only the top five positions are included.

Previous race: 2022 Sonsio Grand Prix at Road America	IndyCar Series; 2022 season	Next race: 2022 Honda Indy Toronto
Previous race: 2021 Honda Indy 200	Indy 200 at Mid-Ohio	Next race: 2023 Honda Indy 200
