= 2022 Sonsio Grand Prix at Road America =

Indycar race held in Elkhart Lake, Wisconsin

(United States) 2022 Sonsio Grand Prix at Road America
Race details
8th round of the 2022 IndyCar season
← Previous race	Next race →
- Date: June 12, 2022
- Official name: Sonsio Grand Prix at Road America
- Location: Road America, Elkhart Lake, Wisconsin
- Course: Permanent road course 4.014 mi / 6.460 km
- Distance: 55 laps 220.55 mi / 354.94 km

Pole position
- Driver: (United States) Alexander Rossi (Andretti Autosport)
- Time: 01:44.8656

Fastest lap
- Driver: (United States) Josef Newgarden (Team Penske)
- Time: 01:46.6212 (on lap 13 of 55)

Podium
- First: (United States) Josef Newgarden (Team Penske)
- Second: (Sweden) Marcus Ericsson (Chip Ganassi Racing)
- Third: (United States) Alexander Rossi (Andretti Autosport)

The 2022 Sonsio Grand Prix at Road America was the eighth round of the 2022 IndyCar season. The race was held on June 12, 2022, in Elkhart Lake, Wisconsin at Road America. The race consisted of 55 laps and was won by Josef Newgarden.

== Entry list ==
Key	Meaning
R	Rookie
W	Past winner

No.	Driver	Team	Engine
2	(United States) Josef Newgarden W	Team Penske	Chevrolet
3	(New Zealand) Scott McLaughlin	Team Penske	Chevrolet
4	(Canada) Dalton Kellett	A. J. Foyt Enterprises	Chevrolet
5	(Mexico) Patricio O'Ward	Arrow McLaren SP	Chevrolet
06	(Brazil) Hélio Castroneves	Meyer Shank Racing	Honda
7	(Sweden) Felix Rosenqvist W	Arrow McLaren SP	Chevrolet
8	(Sweden) Marcus Ericsson	Chip Ganassi Racing	Honda
9	(New Zealand) Scott Dixon W	Chip Ganassi Racing	Honda
10	(Spain) Álex Palou W	Chip Ganassi Racing	Honda
11	(Colombia) Tatiana Calderón R	A. J. Foyt Enterprises	Chevrolet
12	(Australia) Will Power W	Team Penske	Chevrolet
14	(United States) Kyle Kirkwood R	A. J. Foyt Enterprises	Chevrolet
15	(United States) Graham Rahal	Rahal Letterman Lanigan Racing	Honda
16	(Switzerland) Simona de Silvestro	Paretta Autosport	Chevrolet
18	(United States) David Malukas R	Dale Coyne Racing with HMD Motorsports	Honda
20	(United States) Conor Daly	Ed Carpenter Racing	Chevrolet
21	(Netherlands) Rinus VeeKay	Ed Carpenter Racing	Chevrolet
26	(United States) Colton Herta	Andretti Autosport	Honda
27	(United States) Alexander Rossi W	Andretti Autosport	Honda
28	(France) Romain Grosjean	Andretti Autosport	Honda
29	(Canada) Devlin DeFrancesco R	Andretti Steinbrenner Autosport	Honda
30	(Denmark) Christian Lundgaard R	Rahal Letterman Lanigan Racing	Honda
45	(United Kingdom) Jack Harvey	Rahal Letterman Lanigan Racing	Honda
48	(United States) Jimmie Johnson	Chip Ganassi Racing	Honda
51	(Japan) Takuma Sato	Dale Coyne Racing with Rick Ware Racing	Honda
60	(France) Simon Pagenaud	Meyer Shank Racing	Honda
77	(United Kingdom) Callum Ilott R	Juncos Hollinger Racing	Chevrolet

== Practice ==
=== Practice 1 ===
Top Practice Speeds
Pos	No.	Driver	Team	Engine	Lap Time
1	27	(United States) Alexander Rossi W	Andretti Autosport	Honda	01:45.6027
2	26	(United States) Colton Herta	Andretti Autosport with Curb-Agajanian	Honda	01:45.7361
3	8	(Sweden) Marcus Ericsson	Chip Ganassi Racing	Honda	01:45.8050

=== Practice 2 ===
Top Practice Speeds
Pos	No.	Driver	Team	Engine	Lap Time
1	5	(Mexico) Pato O'Ward	Arrow McLaren SP	Chevrolet	01:45.2681
2	12	(Australia) Will Power W	Team Penske	Chevrolet	01:45.3849
3	10	(Spain) Álex Palou W	Chip Ganassi Racing	Honda	01:45.4062

== Qualifying ==
=== Qualifying classification ===
Pos	No.	Driver	Team	Engine	Time				Final grid
Pos	No.	Driver	Team	Engine	Round 1		Round 2	Round 3	Final grid
Pos	No.	Driver	Team	Engine	Group 1	Group 2	Round 2	Round 3	Final grid
1	27	(United States) Alexander Rossi **W**	Andretti Autosport	Honda	01:44.8954	N/A	01:45.0733	**01:44.8656**	1
2	2	(United States) Josef Newgarden **W**	Team Penske	Chevrolet	N/A	**01:44.5552**	01:44.5530	01:44.9371	2
3	10	(Spain) Álex Palou **W**	Chip Ganassi Racing	Honda	N/A	01:45.1255	01:44.8313	01:45.3822	3
4	8	(Sweden) Marcus Ericsson	Chip Ganassi Racing	Honda	N/A	01:45.2049	01:44.7887	01:45.4240	4
5	26	(United States) Colton Herta	Andretti Autosport with Curb-Agajanian	Honda	01:44.9268	N/A	**01:44.4038**	01:45.5388	5
6	5	(Mexico) Pato O'Ward	Arrow McLaren SP	Chevrolet	N/A	01:45.1033	01:44.8704	01:45.6826	6
7	28	(France) Romain Grosjean	Andretti Autosport	Honda	**01:44.8840**	N/A	01:45.1543	N/A	7
8	7	(Sweden) Felix Rosenqvist **W**	Arrow McLaren SP	Chevrolet	N/A	01:45.1494	01:45.2307	N/A	8
9	3	(New Zealand) Scott McLaughlin	Team Penske	Chevrolet	N/A	01:45.5678	01:45.2412	N/A	9
10	9	(New Zealand) Scott Dixon **W**	Chip Ganassi Racing	Honda	01:45.0906	N/A	01:45.2446	N/A	10
11	60	(France) Simon Pagenaud	Meyer Shank Racing	Honda	01:45.2278	N/A	01:45.2759	N/A	11
12	77	(United Kingdom) Callum Ilott **R**	Juncos Hollinger Racing	Chevrolet	01:45.3906	N/A	No Time	N/A	12
13	30	(Denmark) Christian Lundgaard **R**	Rahal Letterman Lanigan Racing	Honda	01:45.4024	N/A	N/A	N/A	13
14	18	(United States) David Malukas **R**	Dale Coyne Racing with HMD Motorsports	Honda	N/A	01:45.6017	N/A	N/A	14
15	12	(Australia) Will Power **W**	Team Penske	Chevrolet	01:45.4227	N/A	N/A	N/A	15
16	06	(Brazil) Hélio Castroneves	Meyer Shank Racing	Honda	N/A	01:45.6217	N/A	N/A	16
17	21	(Netherlands) Rinus VeeKay	Ed Carpenter Racing	Chevrolet	01:45.5581	N/A	N/A	N/A	17
18	20	(United States) Conor Daly	Ed Carpenter Racing	Chevrolet	N/A	01:45.7234	N/A	N/A	18
19	51	(Japan) Takuma Sato	Dale Coyne Racing with Rick Ware Racing	Honda	01:45.7045	N/A	N/A	N/A	19
20	45	(United Kingdom) Jack Harvey	Rahal Letterman Lanigan Racing	Honda	N/A	01:45.9420	N/A	N/A	20
21	29	(Canada) Devlin DeFrancesco **R**	Andretti Steinbrenner Autosport	Honda	01:46.0785	N/A	N/A	N/A	21
22	15	(United States) Graham Rahal	Rahal Letterman Lanigan Racing	Honda	N/A	01:45.9951	N/A	N/A	22
23	4	(Canada) Dalton Kellett	A. J. Foyt Enterprises	Chevrolet	01:46.9755	N/A	N/A	N/A	23
24	14	(United States) Kyle Kirkwood **R**	A. J. Foyt Enterprises	Chevrolet	N/A	01:46.6130	N/A	N/A	24
25	11	(Colombia) Tatiana Calderón **R**	A. J. Foyt Enterprises	Chevrolet	01:47.5661	N/A	N/A	N/A	25
26	48	(United States) Jimmie Johnson	Chip Ganassi Racing	Honda	N/A	01:47.3134	N/A	N/A	26
27	16	(Switzerland) Simona de Silvestro	Paretta Autosport	Chevrolet	N/A	01:48.1033	N/A	N/A	27

Notes

- **Bold text** indicates fastest time set in session.

== Final Practice ==
Top Final Practice Speeds
Pos	No.	Driver	Team	Engine	Lap Time
1	10	(Spain) Álex Palou W	Chip Ganassi Racing	Honda	01:46.2291
2	2	(United States) Josef Newgarden W	Team Penske	Chevrolet	01:46.5337
3	60	(France) Simon Pagenaud	Meyer Shank Racing	Honda	01:46.5752

== Race ==
The race started at 12:55 PM ET on June 12, 2022.

=== Race classification ===
Pos	No.	Driver	Team	Engine	Laps	Time/Retired	Pit Stops	Grid	Laps Led	Pts.
1	2	(United States) Josef Newgarden W	Team Penske	Chevrolet	55	01:53:02.8097	3	2	26	53
2	8	(Sweden) Marcus Ericsson	Chip Ganassi Racing	Honda	55	+3.3710	3	4	3	41
3	27	(United States) Alexander Rossi W	Andretti Autosport	Honda	55	+5.6348	3	1	16	37
4	28	(France) Romain Grosjean	Andretti Autosport	Honda	55	+5.8490	3	6	1	33
5	26	(United States) Colton Herta	Andretti Autosport with Curb-Agajanian	Honda	55	+8.7657	3	11		30
6	7	(Sweden) Felix Rosenqvist W	Arrow McLaren SP	Chevrolet	55	+9.2835	3	7	7	29
7	3	(New Zealand) Scott McLaughlin	Team Penske	Chevrolet	55	+9.3064	3	8		26
8	15	(United States) Graham Rahal	Rahal Letterman Lanigan Racing	Honda	55	+9.3728	3	22		24
9	9	(New Zealand) Scott Dixon W	Chip Ganassi Racing	Honda	55	+9.7102	3	9		22
10	30	(Denmark) Christian Lundgaard R	Rahal Letterman Lanigan Racing	Honda	55	+10.0430	3	13	1	21
11	77	(United Kingdom) Callum Ilott R	Juncos Hollinger Racing	Chevrolet	55	+10.6025	3	12		19
12	60	(France) Simon Pagenaud	Meyer Shank Racing	Honda	55	+11.7440	3	10		18
13	45	(United Kingdom) Jack Harvey	Rahal Letterman Lanigan Racing	Honda	55	+13.4662	3	20		17
14	20	(United States) Conor Daly	Ed Carpenter Racing	Chevrolet	55	+14.7608	3	18		16
15	51	(Japan) Takuma Sato	Dale Coyne Racing with Rick Ware Racing	Honda	55	+15.0849	3	19	1	16
16	18	(United States) David Malukas R	Dale Coyne Racing with HMD Motorsports	Honda	55	+16.1401	3	14		14
17	21	(Netherlands) Rinus VeeKay	Ed Carpenter Racing	Chevrolet	55	+16.6505	5	17		13
18	29	(Canada) Devlin DeFrancesco R	Andretti Steinbrenner Autosport	Honda	55	+16.8028	5	21		12
19	12	(Australia) Will Power W	Team Penske	Chevrolet	55	+17.2091	5	15		11
20	14	(United States) Kyle Kirkwood R	A. J. Foyt Enterprises	Chevrolet	55	+18.6841	4	24		10
21	16	(Switzerland) Simona de Silvestro	Paretta Autosport	Chevrolet	55	+20.2548	4	27		9
22	06	(Brazil) Hélio Castroneves	Meyer Shank Racing	Honda	55	+21.4368	3	16		8
23	4	(Canada) Dalton Kellett	A. J. Foyt Enterprises	Chevrolet	55	+23.3098	4	23		7
24	48	(United States) Jimmie Johnson	Chip Ganassi Racing	Honda	54	+1 Lap	4	26		6
25	11	(Colombia) Tatiana Calderón R	A. J. Foyt Enterprises	Chevrolet	54	+1 Lap	6	25		5
26	5	(Mexico) Pato O'Ward	Arrow McLaren SP	Chevrolet	46	Engine	3	5		5
27	10	(Spain) Álex Palou W	Chip Ganassi Racing	Honda	36	Accident Damage	3	3		5
Fastest lap: (United States) Josef Newgarden (Team Penske) – 01:46.6212 (lap 13)

== Championship standings after the race ==
Drivers' Championship standings

	Pos.	Driver	Points
1	1	(Sweden) Marcus Ericsson	293
1	2	(Australia) Will Power	266
2	3	(United States) Josef Newgarden	261
1	4	(Mexico) Pato O'Ward	248
1	5	(Spain) Álex Palou	246

Engine manufacturer standings

	Pos.	Manufacturer	Points
Unchanged	1	Chevrolet	678
Unchanged	2	Honda	618

- Note: Only the top five positions are included.
