= 2022 Chevrolet Detroit Grand Prix =

Indycar race held in Detroit, Michigan

(United States) 2022 Chevrolet Detroit Grand Prix
Race details
7th round of the 2022 IndyCar season
| ← Previous race | Next race → |
- Date: June 5, 2022
- Official name: Chevrolet Detroit Grand Prix
- Location: The Raceway on Belle Isle, Detroit, Michigan
- Course: Temporary street circuit 2.350 mi / 3.782 km
- Distance: 70 laps 164.500 mi / 264.737 km

Pole position
- Driver: (United States) Josef Newgarden (Team Penske)
- Time: 01:15.2153

Fastest lap
- Driver: (United States) David Malukas (Dale Coyne Racing with HMD Motorsports)
- Time: 01:16.4034 (on lap 52 of 70)

Podium
- First: (Australia) Will Power (Team Penske)
- Second: (United States) Alexander Rossi (Andretti Autosport)
- Third: (New Zealand) Scott Dixon (Chip Ganassi Racing)

The 2022 Chevrolet Detroit Grand Prix was the seventh round of the 2022 IndyCar season. Held on June 5, 2022, in Detroit, Michigan at The Raceway at Belle Isle Park, the race consisted of 70 laps and was won by Will Power.

== Entry list ==
| Key | Meaning |
|---|---|
| R | Rookie |
| W | Past winner |

| No. | Driver | Team | Engine |
|---|---|---|---|
| 2 | (United States) Josef Newgarden W | Team Penske | Chevrolet |
| 3 | (New Zealand) Scott McLaughlin | Team Penske | Chevrolet |
| 4 | (Canada) Dalton Kellett | A. J. Foyt Enterprises | Chevrolet |
| 5 | (Mexico) Patricio O'Ward W | Arrow McLaren SP | Chevrolet |
| 06 | (Brazil) Hélio Castroneves W | Meyer Shank Racing | Honda |
| 7 | (Sweden) Felix Rosenqvist | Arrow McLaren SP | Chevrolet |
| 8 | (Sweden) Marcus Ericsson W | Chip Ganassi Racing | Honda |
| 9 | (New Zealand) Scott Dixon W | Chip Ganassi Racing | Honda |
| 10 | (Spain) Álex Palou | Chip Ganassi Racing | Honda |
| 11 | (Colombia) Tatiana Calderón R | A. J. Foyt Enterprises | Chevrolet |
| 12 | (Australia) Will Power W | Team Penske | Chevrolet |
| 14 | (United States) Kyle Kirkwood R | A. J. Foyt Enterprises | Chevrolet |
| 15 | (United States) Graham Rahal W | Rahal Letterman Lanigan Racing | Honda |
| 18 | (United States) David Malukas R | Dale Coyne Racing with HMD Motorsports | Honda |
| 20 | (United States) Conor Daly | Ed Carpenter Racing | Chevrolet |
| 21 | (Netherlands) Rinus VeeKay | Ed Carpenter Racing | Chevrolet |
| 26 | (United States) Colton Herta | Andretti Autosport | Honda |
| 27 | (United States) Alexander Rossi | Andretti Autosport | Honda |
| 28 | (France) Romain Grosjean | Andretti Autosport | Honda |
| 29 | (Canada) Devlin DeFrancesco R | Andretti Steinbrenner Autosport | Honda |
| 30 | (Denmark) Christian Lundgaard R | Rahal Letterman Lanigan Racing | Honda |
| 45 | (United Kingdom) Jack Harvey | Rahal Letterman Lanigan Racing | Honda |
| 48 | (United States) Jimmie Johnson | Chip Ganassi Racing | Honda |
| 51 | (Japan) Takuma Sato | Dale Coyne Racing with Rick Ware Racing | Honda |
| 60 | (France) Simon Pagenaud W | Meyer Shank Racing | Honda |
| 77 | (United States) Santino Ferrucci | Juncos Hollinger Racing | Chevrolet |

== Practice ==
=== Practice 1 ===
Top Practice Speeds
| Pos | No. | Driver | Team | Engine | Lap Time |
|---|---|---|---|---|---|
| 1 | 14 | (United States) Kyle Kirkwood R | A. J. Foyt Enterprises | Chevrolet | 01:16.1345 |
| 2 | 5 | (Mexico) Pato O'Ward W | Arrow McLaren SP | Chevrolet | 01:16.1556 |
| 3 | 27 | (United States) Alexander Rossi | Andretti Autosport | Honda | 01:16.5146 |

=== Practice 2 ===
Top Practice Speeds
| Pos | No. | Driver | Team | Engine | Lap Time |
|---|---|---|---|---|---|
| 1 | 27 | (United States) Alexander Rossi | Andretti Autosport | Honda | 01:15.8101 |
| 2 | 60 | (France) Simon Pagenaud W | Meyer Shank Racing | Honda | 01:15.8803 |
| 3 | 2 | (United States) Josef Newgarden W | Team Penske | Chevrolet | 01:15.9118 |

== Qualifying ==
=== Qualifying classification ===
| Pos | No. | Driver | Team | Engine | Time | | | | Final grid |
| Pos | No. | Driver | Team | Engine | Round 1 | | Round 2 | Round 3 | Final grid |
| Pos | No. | Driver | Team | Engine | Group 1 | Group 2 | Round 2 | Round 3 | Final grid |
|---|---|---|---|---|---|---|---|---|---|
| 1 | 2 | (United States) Josef Newgarden **W** | Team Penske | Chevrolet | N/A | 01:15.2262 | 01:15.0289 | **01:15.2153** | 1 |
| 2 | 51 | (Japan) Takuma Sato | Dale Coyne Racing with Rick Ware Racing | Honda | N/A | 01:15.3911 | 01:14.9363 | 01:15.3490 | 2 |
| 3 | 60 | (France) Simon Pagenaud **W** | Meyer Shank Racing | Honda | 01:15.8463 | N/A | 01:14.9172 | 01:15.3951 | 3 |
| 4 | 06 | (Brazil) Hélio Castroneves **W** | Meyer Shank Racing | Honda | **01:15.4367** | N/A | 01:14.8593 | 01:15.4538 | 4 |
| 5 | 5 | (Mexico) Pato O'Ward **W** | Arrow McLaren SP | Chevrolet | 01:15.5973 | N/A | **01:14.6681** | 01:16.3301 | 5 |
| 6 | 18 | (United States) David Malukas **R** | Dale Coyne Racing with HMD Motorsports | Honda | N/A | **01:14.8833** | 01:14.8251 | 01:16.6104 | 6 |
| 7 | 26 | (United States) Colton Herta | Andretti Autosport with Curb-Agajanian | Honda | N/A | 01:15.2003 | 01:15.1043 | N/A | 7 |
| 8 | 8 | (Sweden) Marcus Ericsson **W** | Chip Ganassi Racing | Honda | 01:15.6159 | N/A | 01:15.2279 | N/A | 8 |
| 9 | 9 | (New Zealand) Scott Dixon **W** | Chip Ganassi Racing | Honda | N/A | 01:15.3309 | 01:15.4057 | N/A | 9 |
| 10 | 3 | (New Zealand) Scott McLaughlin | Team Penske | Chevrolet | 01:15.6765 | N/A | 01:15.8670 | N/A | 10 |
| 11 | 27 | (United States) Alexander Rossi | Andretti Autosport | Honda | N/A | 01:15.0288 | 01:16.2179 | N/A | 11 |
| 12 | 28 | (France) Romain Grosjean | Andretti Autosport | Honda | 01:16.0067 | N/A | 01:16.9740 | N/A | 12 |
| 13 | 20 | (United States) Conor Daly | Ed Carpenter Racing | Chevrolet | 01:16.0154 | N/A | N/A | N/A | 13 |
| 14 | 21 | (Netherlands) Rinus VeeKay | Ed Carpenter Racing | Chevrolet | N/A | 01:15.5482 | N/A | N/A | 14 |
| 15 | 14 | (United States) Kyle Kirkwood **R** | A. J. Foyt Enterprises | Chevrolet | 01:16.1255 | N/A | N/A | N/A | 15 |
| 16 | 12 | (Australia) Will Power **W** | Team Penske | Chevrolet | N/A | 01:15.5731 | N/A | N/A | 16 |
| 17 | 77 | (United States) Santino Ferrucci | Juncos Hollinger Racing | Chevrolet | 01:16.1390 | N/A | N/A | N/A | 17 |
| 18 | 10 | (Spain) Álex Palou | Chip Ganassi Racing | Honda | N/A | 01:15.6121 | N/A | N/A | 18 |
| 19 | 30 | (Denmark) Christian Lundgaard **R** | Rahal Letterman Lanigan Racing | Honda | 01:16.3068 | N/A | N/A | N/A | 19 |
| 20 | 45 | (United Kingdom) Jack Harvey | Rahal Letterman Lanigan Racing | Honda | N/A | 01:16.8347 | N/A | N/A | 20 |
| 21 | 29 | (Canada) Devlin DeFrancesco **R** | Andretti Steinbrenner Autosport | Honda | 01:16.3374 | N/A | N/A | N/A | 21 |
| 22 | 48 | (United States) Jimmie Johnson | Chip Ganassi Racing | Honda | N/A | 01:17.5499 | N/A | N/A | 22 |
| 23 | 15 | (United States) Graham Rahal **W** | Rahal Letterman Lanigan Racing | Honda | 01:16.4265 | N/A | N/A | N/A | 23 |
| 24 | 11 | (Colombia) Tatiana Calderón **R** | A. J. Foyt Enterprises | Chevrolet | N/A | 01:18.3657 | N/A | N/A | 24 |
| 25 | 7 | (Sweden) Felix Rosenqvist | Arrow McLaren SP | Chevrolet | N/A | 01:18.6291 | N/A | N/A | 25 |
| 26 | 4 | (Canada) Dalton Kellett | A. J. Foyt Enterprises | Chevrolet | No Time | N/A | N/A | N/A | 26 |

Notes

- **Bold text** indicates fastest time set in session.

== Warmup ==
Top Warmup Speeds
| Pos | No. | Driver | Team | Engine | Lap Time |
|---|---|---|---|---|---|
| 1 | 27 | (United States) Alexander Rossi | Andretti Autosport | Honda | 01:15.5816 |
| 2 | 8 | (Sweden) Marcus Ericsson W | Chip Ganassi Racing | Honda | 01:15.9213 |
| 3 | 9 | (New Zealand) Scott Dixon W | Chip Ganassi Racing | Honda | 01:15.9755 |

== Race ==
The race started at 3:45 PM ET on June 5, 2022.

=== Race classification ===
| Pos | No. | Driver | Team | Engine | Laps | Time/Retired | Pit Stops | Grid | Laps Led | Pts. |
|---|---|---|---|---|---|---|---|---|---|---|
| 1 | 12 | (Australia) Will Power W | Team Penske | Chevrolet | 70 | 01:32:08.8183 | 2 | 16 | 55 | 53 |
| 2 | 27 | (United States) Alexander Rossi | Andretti Autosport | Honda | 70 | +1.0027 | 3 | 11 | | 40 |
| 3 | 9 | (New Zealand) Scott Dixon W | Chip Ganassi Racing | Honda | 70 | +7.1239 | 2 | 9 | 1 | 36 |
| 4 | 2 | (United States) Josef Newgarden W | Team Penske | Chevrolet | 70 | +10.6716 | 2 | 1 | 13 | 34 |
| 5 | 5 | (Mexico) Pato O'Ward W | Arrow McLaren SP | Chevrolet | 70 | +11.2348 | 2 | 5 | | 30 |
| 6 | 10 | (Spain) Álex Palou | Chip Ganassi Racing | Honda | 70 | +14.9056 | 2 | 18 | 1 | 29 |
| 7 | 8 | (Sweden) Marcus Ericsson W | Chip Ganassi Racing | Honda | 70 | +40.8996 | 2 | 8 | | 26 |
| 8 | 26 | (United States) Colton Herta | Andretti Autosport with Curb-Agajanian | Honda | 70 | +41.1286 | 2 | 7 | | 24 |
| 9 | 60 | (France) Simon Pagenaud W | Meyer Shank Racing | Honda | 70 | +41.2942 | 2 | 3 | | 22 |
| 10 | 7 | (Sweden) Felix Rosenqvist | Arrow McLaren SP | Chevrolet | 70 | +42.8774 | 3 | 25 | | 20 |
| 11 | 18 | (United States) David Malukas R | Dale Coyne Racing with HMD Motorsports | Honda | 70 | +45.8916 | 3 | 6 | | 19 |
| 12 | 20 | (United States) Conor Daly | Ed Carpenter Racing | Chevrolet | 70 | +51.1769 | 3 | 13 | | 18 |
| 13 | 51 | (Japan) Takuma Sato | Dale Coyne Racing with Rick Ware Racing | Honda | 70 | +52.2162 | 3 | 2 | | 17 |
| 14 | 30 | (Denmark) Christian Lundgaard R | Rahal Letterman Lanigan Racing | Honda | 70 | +1:12.7763 | 3 | 19 | | 16 |
| 15 | 45 | (United Kingdom) Jack Harvey | Rahal Letterman Lanigan Racing | Honda | 70 | +1:28.2411 | 3 | 20 | | 15 |
| 16 | 21 | (Netherlands) Rinus VeeKay | Ed Carpenter Racing | Chevrolet | 69 | Accident | 3 | 14 | | 14 |
| 17 | 28 | (France) Romain Grosjean | Andretti Autosport | Honda | 69 | +1 Lap | 3 | 12 | | 13 |
| 18 | 29 | (Canada) Devlin DeFrancesco R | Andretti Steinbrenner Autosport | Honda | 69 | +1 Lap | 2 | 21 | | 12 |
| 19 | 3 | (New Zealand) Scott McLaughlin | Team Penske | Chevrolet | 69 | +1 Lap | 2 | 10 | | 11 |
| 20 | 4 | (Canada) Dalton Kellett | A. J. Foyt Enterprises | Chevrolet | 69 | +1 Lap | 2 | 26 | | 10 |
| 21 | 77 | (United States) Santino Ferrucci | Juncos Hollinger Racing | Chevrolet | 68 | +2 Laps | 3 | 17 | | 9 |
| 22 | 48 | (United States) Jimmie Johnson | Chip Ganassi Racing | Honda | 68 | +2 Laps | 3 | 22 | | 8 |
| 23 | 11 | (Colombia) Tatiana Calderón R | A. J. Foyt Enterprises | Chevrolet | 68 | +2 Laps | 2 | 24 | | 7 |
| 24 | 14 | (United States) Kyle Kirkwood R | A. J. Foyt Enterprises | Chevrolet | 49 | Accident | 2 | 15 | | 6 |
| 25 | 06 | (Brazil) Hélio Castroneves W | Meyer Shank Racing | Honda | 21 | Electrics | 1 | 4 | | 5 |
| 26 | 15 | (United States) Graham Rahal W | Rahal Letterman Lanigan Racing | Honda | 2 | Accident | | 23 | | 5 |
Fastest lap: (United States) David Malukas (Dale Coyne Racing with HMD Motorsports) – 01:16.4034 (lap 52)

== Championship standings after the race ==
Drivers' Championship standings

| | Pos. | Driver | Points |
|---|---|---|---|
| 3 | 1 | (Australia) Will Power | 255 |
| 1 | 2 | (Sweden) Marcus Ericsson | 252 |
| 1 | 3 | (Mexico) Pato O'Ward | 243 |
| 1 | 4 | (Spain) Álex Palou | 241 |
| Unchanged | 5 | (United States) Josef Newgarden | 208 |

Engine manufacturer standings

| | Pos. | Manufacturer | Points |
|---|---|---|---|
| Unchanged | 1 | Chevrolet | 595 |
| Unchanged | 2 | Honda | 542 |

- Note: Only the top five positions are included.
