= Callum Ilott =

British racing driver (born 1998)

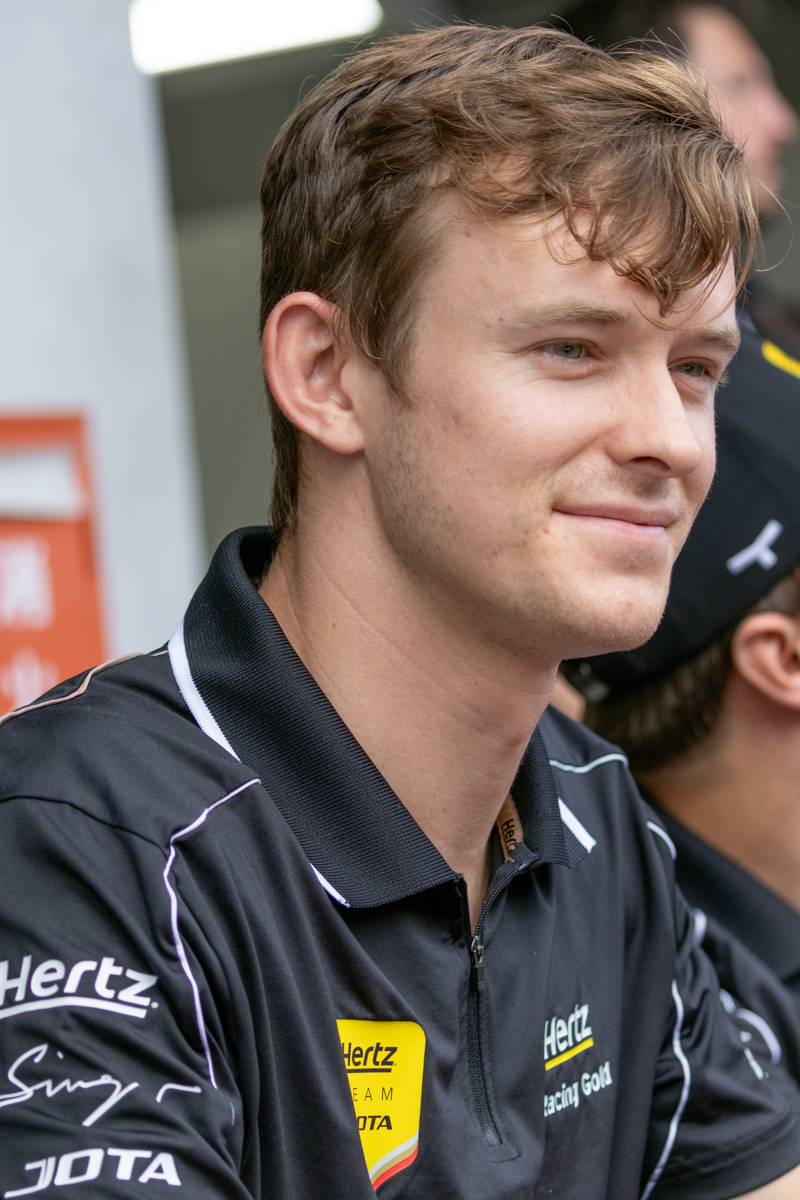
- Ilott at the 2024 6 Hours of Fuji
- Nationality: (United Kingdom) British
- Born: 11 November 1998 (age 28); Cambridge, Cambridgeshire, England

IndyCar Series career
- 40 races run over 4 years
- Team: No. 90 (Prema Racing)
- Best finish: 16th (2023)
- First race: 2021 Grand Prix of Portland (Portland)
- Last race: 2025 Borchetta Bourbon Music City Grand Prix (Nashville)
Wins	Podiums	Poles
0	0	0

FIA World Endurance Championship career
- Categorisation: FIA Platinum
- Years active: 2024
- Teams: Hertz Team Jota
- Starts: 8
- Championships: 0
- Wins: 1
- Podiums: 2
- Poles: 0
- Fastest laps: 0
- Best finish: 7th in 2024 (LMH)

24 Hours of Le Mans career
- Years: 2021, 2024
- Teams: Iron Lynx, Jota Sport
- Best finish: 8th (2024)
- Class wins: 0

Previous series
- 2021; 2019–2020; 2018; 2015–2017; 2015: GT World Challenge Europe; FIA Formula 2; GP3 Series; FIA F3 European; Toyota Racing Series

Callum Benjamin Ilott (/ˈaɪlɒt/ EYE-lot; born 11 November 1998) is a British racing driver who competes in the IMSA Championship, driving for Wright Motorsports. He previously competed in the 2024 FIA World Endurance Championship racing for Jota Sport in the Hypercar category and in the IndyCar Series, driving the No. 90 Dallara-Chevrolet for Prema Racing.

Ilott was runner-up to Mick Schumacher in the 2020 Formula 2 Championship. He was previously a member of the Ferrari Driver Academy and served as a test and reserve driver for the Ferrari F1 Team.

== Early life ==
As a child, Ilott's parents encouraged him to try a variety of different sports, including football, cricket, rugby, tennis, and others. He got interested in racing after attending a friend's birthday party at a go-kart track.

== Open-wheel racing career ==
=== Karting ===
Making his debut in 2008, Ilott saw his first win in 2011 in the Formula Kart Stars, and finished third in the German Junior Karting Championship, both in KF3. He remained in KF3 with Chiesa Corse Team for the 2012 season, with much success. Ilott put himself on the radar at the age of thirteen by winning the WSK Masters Series, the WSK Final Cup, and finishing as runner-up in the WSK Euro Series and the CIK-FIA World Cup. He was selected as the youngest ever WSK Driver of the Year. In 2013, he contested in KF and KF2 machinery and won the Trofeo delle Industrie and the WSK Final Cup. In 2014, with Zanardi Strakka Racing, he finished fourth in the CIK-FIA World Championship, third in the WSK Champions Cup, and won the WSK Super Masters Series, as well as the CIK-FIA European Championship.

=== Toyota Racing Series ===
Ilott made his single-seater debut in the 2015 Toyota Racing Series with ETEC Motorsport, using a helmet with the Red Bull livery, but unofficially announced as a member of the Red Bull driver development programme. He took a fourth in the seventh race, and in Taupo was the quickest in the practice sessions alongside a near podium-finish in Manfeild. He finished sixteenth in the championship, being fast in qualifying and practices but struggled for race pace.

=== FIA Formula 3 European Championship ===
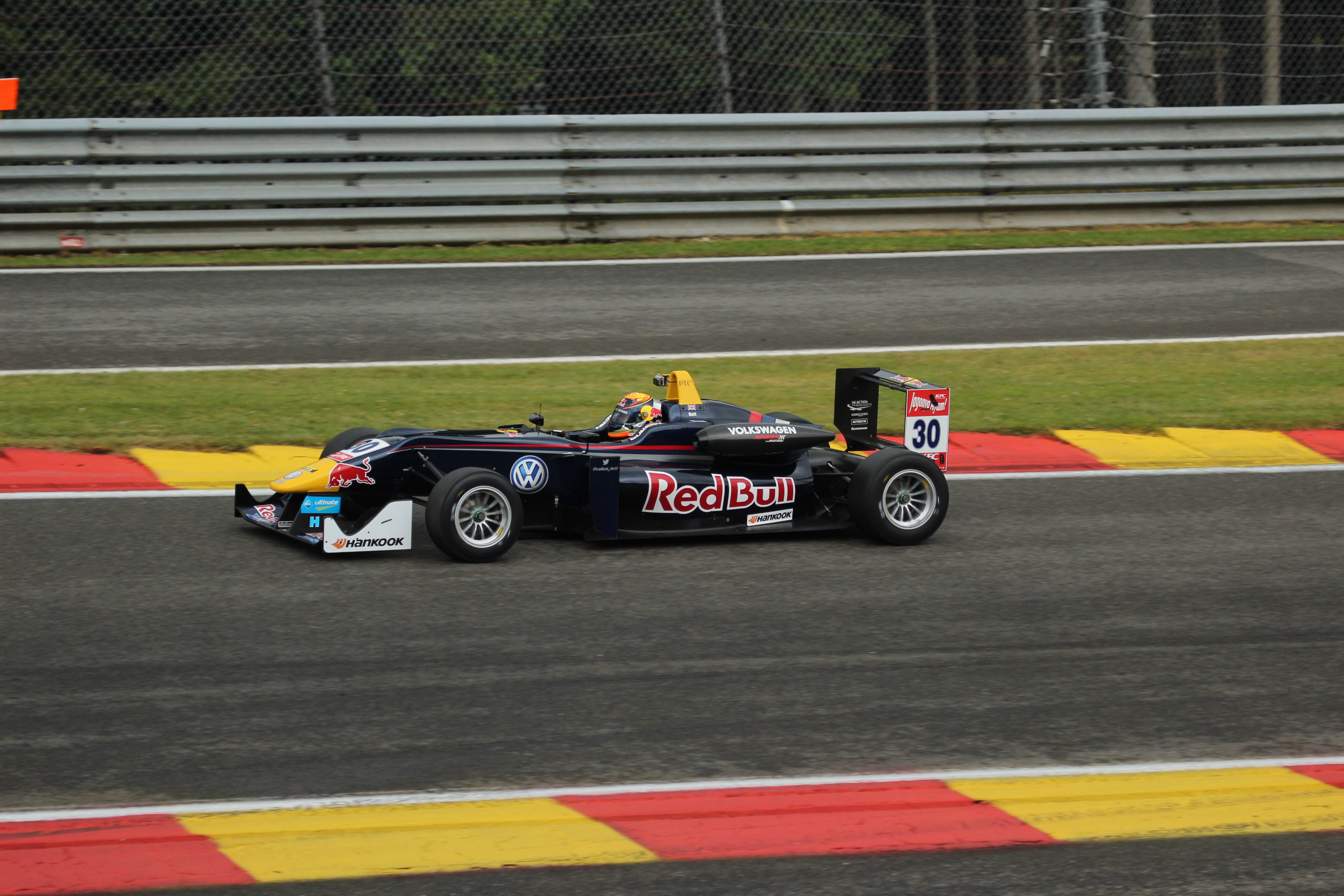
Ilott at Spa-Francorchamps during the 2015 FIA Formula 3 European Championship.

==== 2015 ====
Ilott stepped up to Formula Three in 2015, racing in the FIA European Formula 3 Championship with Carlin aged sixteen. Despite being a rookie, his pace placed him as one of the title contenders before the start of the season. He tested F3 machinery and Formula Renault 2.0 to accumulate experience before his Formula 3 debut. In the preseason testing, Ilott made his first impressions, finishing sixth in his first collective test and second in wet conditions on his second day. Ilott achieved one podium at the Nürburgring, finished seventh in the Rookie Championship and twelfth in the overall standings.

==== 2016 ====
For the 2016 season, Ilott switched to Van Amersfoort Racing alongside rookies Pedro Piquet, Harrison Newey and Anthoine Hubert. In the second race of the first round at Circuit Paul Ricard, Ilott took his first victory in the sport and a second victory at the Red Bull Ring resulting in an overall sixth-place finish.

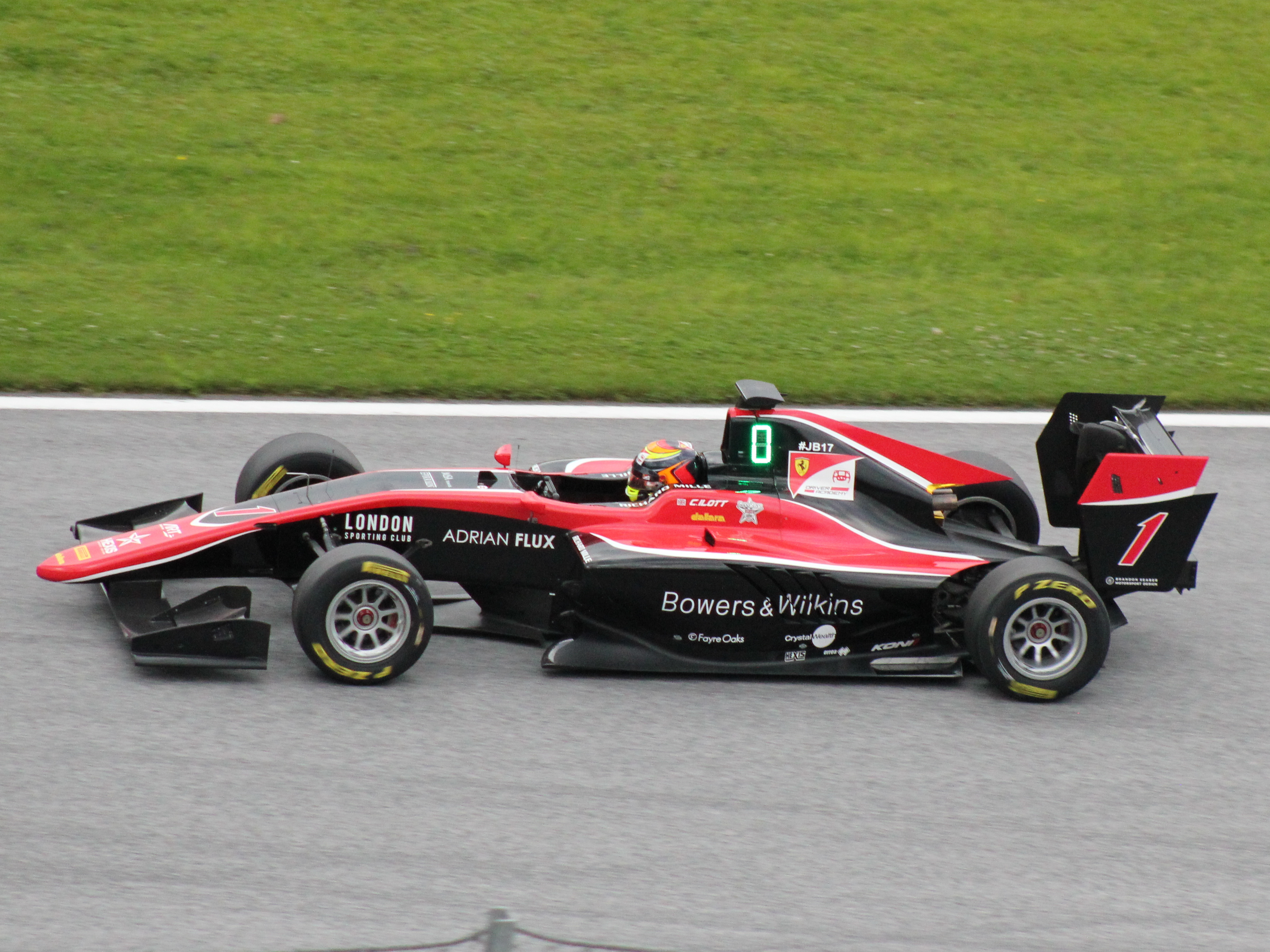
Ilott took pole position and won the feature race at the Red Bull Ring in the 2018 GP3 Series season.

==== 2017 ====
On 22 November 2016, Ilott was confirmed to be racing with Prema Powerteam for the 2017 season. He improved to fourth in the driver standings, losing to his teammate Maximilian Günther by 39 points. Ilott won six races and finished another six races on the podium, helping Prema Powerteam secure the Teams' championship title for the fifth consecutive season.

=== GP2 Series ===
In December 2016, Ilott tested with ART Grand Prix in the post-season test at Yas Marina.

=== GP3 Series ===
After GP3 Series tests at Abu Dhabi, it was announced that Ilott was scheduled to race with ART Grand Prix in the 2018 GP3 Series. He finished in third place, only behind teammates Nikita Mazepin and the late Anthoine Hubert. He scored seven podiums, two of them being victories.

=== FIA Formula 2 Championship ===
==== 2017 ====
In July 2017, Ilott made his debut at the sixth round at Silverstone with Trident. He finished both races outside the top-ten positions.

==== 2019 ====
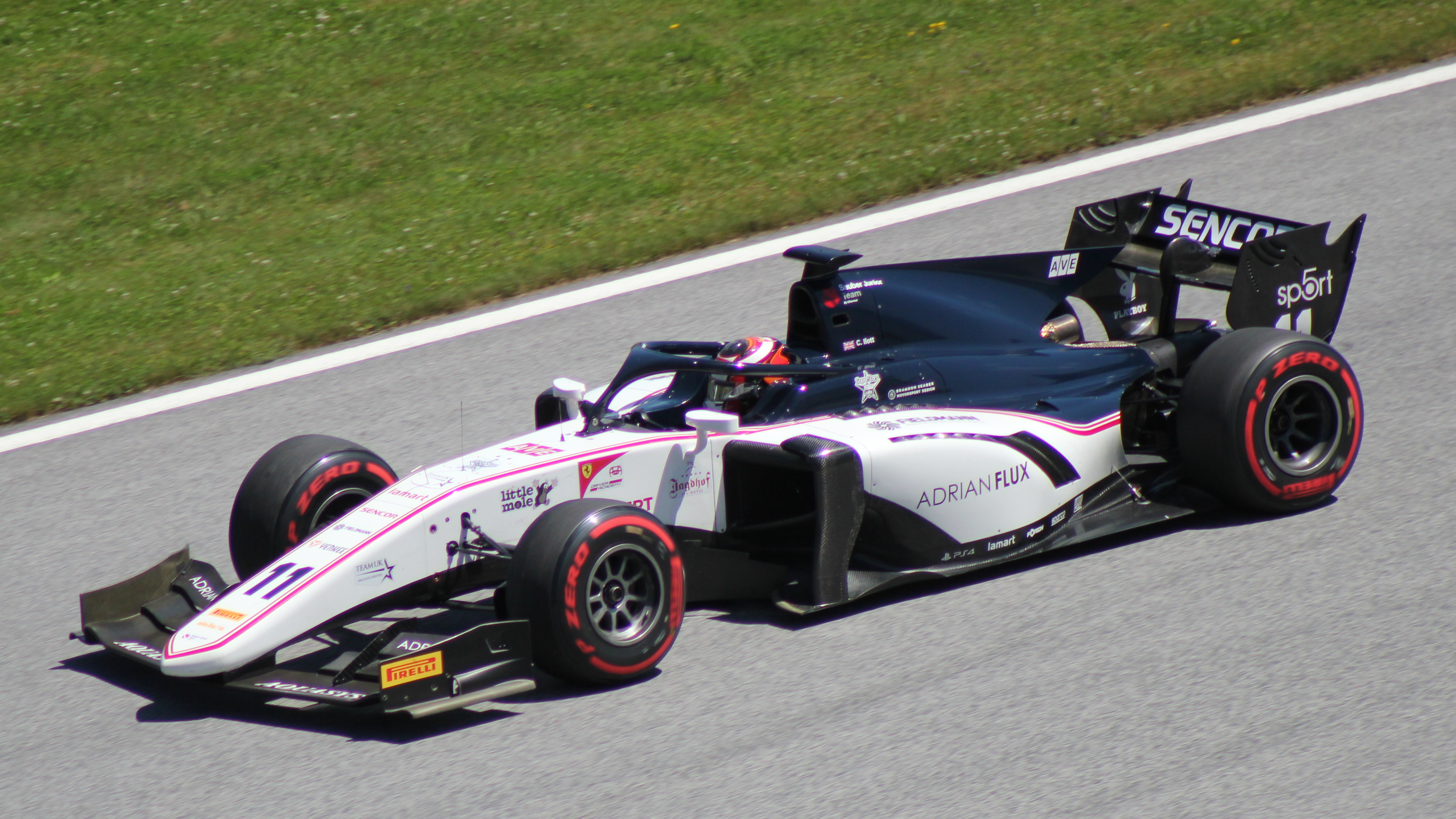
Ilott at the 2019 Spielberg Formula 2 round with Charouz

In 2018, after racing a season of GP3, Ilott took part in the Formula 2 post-season test with Trident and Charouz Racing System.

Ilott then raced a full season in F2, finishing eleventh in the overall standings, securing two podiums in the sprint races in Catalunya and Sochi respectively and his maiden pole in Monza.

==== 2020 ====
For the 2020 season, Ilott left Sauber Junior Team by Charouz and joined 2019 teams' championship runner-up UNI-Virtuosi Racing alongside Zhou Guanyu. He remained a member of the Ferrari Driver Academy. Ilott took his first Formula 2 victory at the delayed season's opening race at the Red Bull Ring after pole sitter Zhou suffered electrical problems. Ahead of the season finale, Ilott announced that he would not race in F2 or F1 in 2021. Ilott ended the season with three wins, five poles and six podiums, finishing runner-up to fellow FDA driver Mick Schumacher. Ilott reunited with his former team Charouz Racing System for the first day of the Formula 2 2020 post-season test in Bahrain.

== Formula One ==
Ilott was inducted into the Red Bull Junior Team in 2015 prior to his FIA Formula 3 European Championship debut, however he was dropped from the programme at the end of the year following a winless campaign. After finishing fourth in the championship in 2017, he became a member of the Ferrari Driver Academy.

Ilott had his first experience in a Formula One car during the 2019 in-season test at the Circuit de Barcelona-Catalunya, driving the Alfa Romeo Racing C38. He completed 41 laps before his running was cut short after he crashed in Turn 3. Ilott was due to make his Formula One weekend debut during the Friday practice session of the 2020 Eifel Grand Prix, driving for the Ferrari-powered Haas F1 Team, but the session was canceled because of poor weather.

After appearing at the post-season test for Alfa Romeo in December 2020, it was announced that Ilott would be taking the role of Scuderia Ferrari test driver for the 2021 season. In April 2021, he was appointed Alfa Romeo's second reserve driver, sharing duties with fellow reserve Robert Kubica. Ilott appeared in FP1 for the team at the Portuguese Grand Prix and the Austrian Grand Prix, running No. 98.

Ilott was recalled by Alfa Romeo to serve as their reserve driver for the 2022 Miami Grand Prix.

== IndyCar Series ==
=== Juncos Hollinger Racing (2021–2023) ===
==== 2021 ====
Ilott signed with Indianapolis-based outfit Juncos Hollinger Racing for the last three races of the 2021 IndyCar Series. He made his debut at the Grand Prix of Portland, where he finished 25th, only completing 77 of the 110 laps due to a mechanical failure mid-race. In the Firestone Grand Prix of Monterey, he crashed his No. 77 car during the warmup session, though he was unharmed by the accident. He went on to finish 22nd, one lap behind the lead pack. In the Acura Grand Prix of Long Beach, Ilott qualified eighteenth. However, after completing 47 of the 85 laps, he was forced to retire with a mechanical issue, finishing 26th.

==== 2022 ====
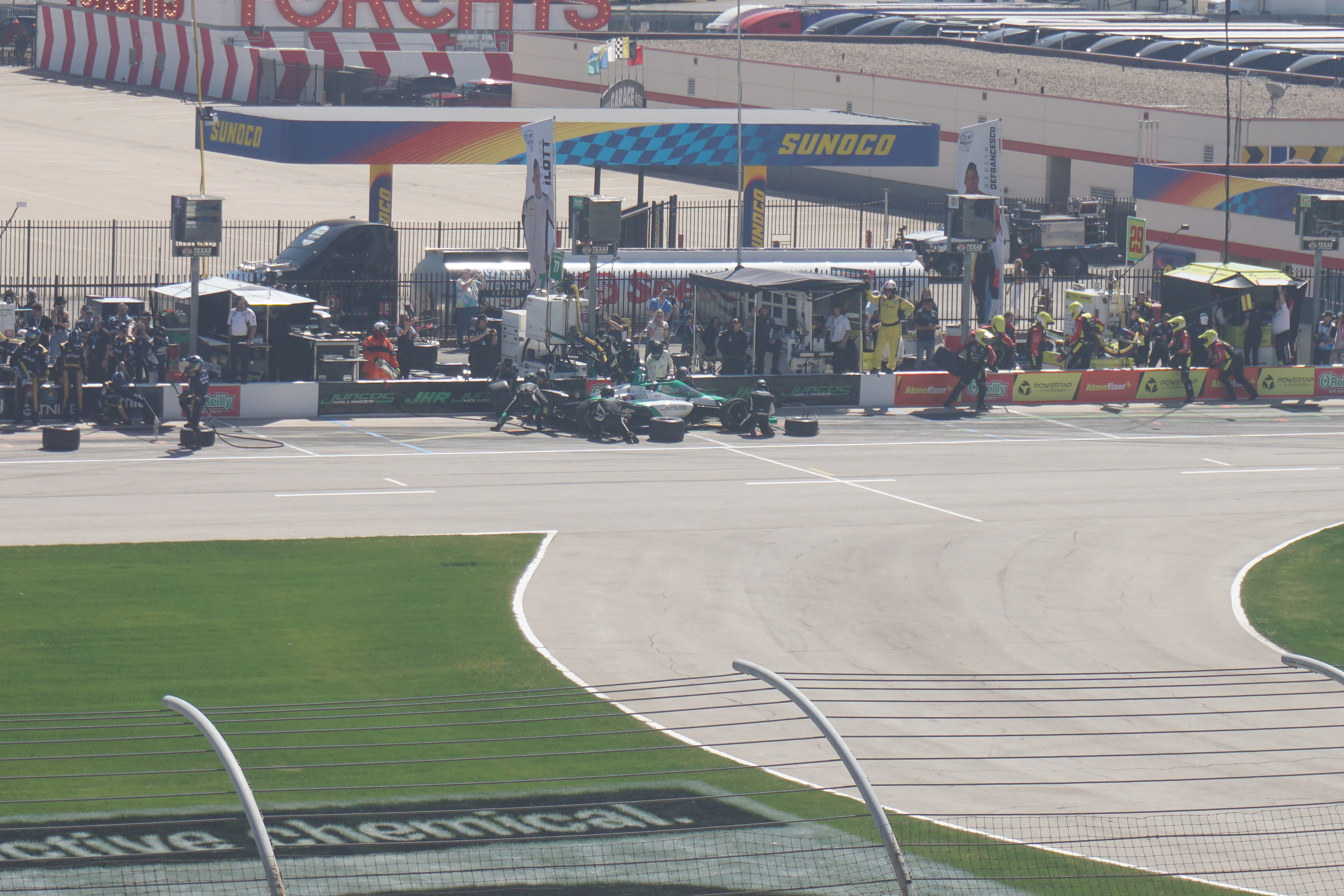
Ilott at the 2022 XPEL 375

On 24 September 2021, Ilott announced that he would remain with Juncos Hollinger Racing and race full-time for the team in the 2022 IndyCar Series.

Following a crash in the 106th Running of the Indianapolis 500, Ilott broke his right hand and was not given medical clearance to race in the Chevrolet Detroit Grand Prix, which took place the following weekend. He made his return in the Sonsio Grand Prix at Road America, where he finished eleventh. He finished the 2022 season at Laguna Seca qualifying on the front row, with his best qualifying result at second, but ultimately retiring from the race with engine issues.

On 28 July 2022, it was announced that Ilott had signed a two-year extension with Juncos Hollinger Racing, keeping him with the team through the 2024 season.

==== 2023 ====
Ilott started the 2023 IndyCar season at the Grand Prix of St. Petersburg where he finished fifth, his best finish in the series. He went on to have a season full of ups and downs, with additional drama off track surrounding his team and teammate. Preparation for the 107th Running of the Indianapolis 500 left Ilott frustrated, commenting "I couldn't even go in a straight line. It was like a ping-pong ball across a corridor. Just bouncing, bouncing, so I'm like, 'That's not good…'" during the first Indy 500 Open Test day in April. Ilott continued to finish towards the bottom in all the practice days in May, before Juncos Hollinger Racing decided to switch the chassis. Ilott, despite only having done eleven laps with the new chassis, qualified 28th, led a few laps, and eventually finished twelfth.

Ilott proceeded to have some great overtakes during the season, even when he had to fight his car on track besides fighting other drivers. He replicated his best finish of fifth at the season finale in Laguna Seca.

On October 26, Ilott and Juncos Hollinger Racing announced that they had mutually agreed to part ways after more than two seasons together.

=== Arrow McLaren (2024) ===
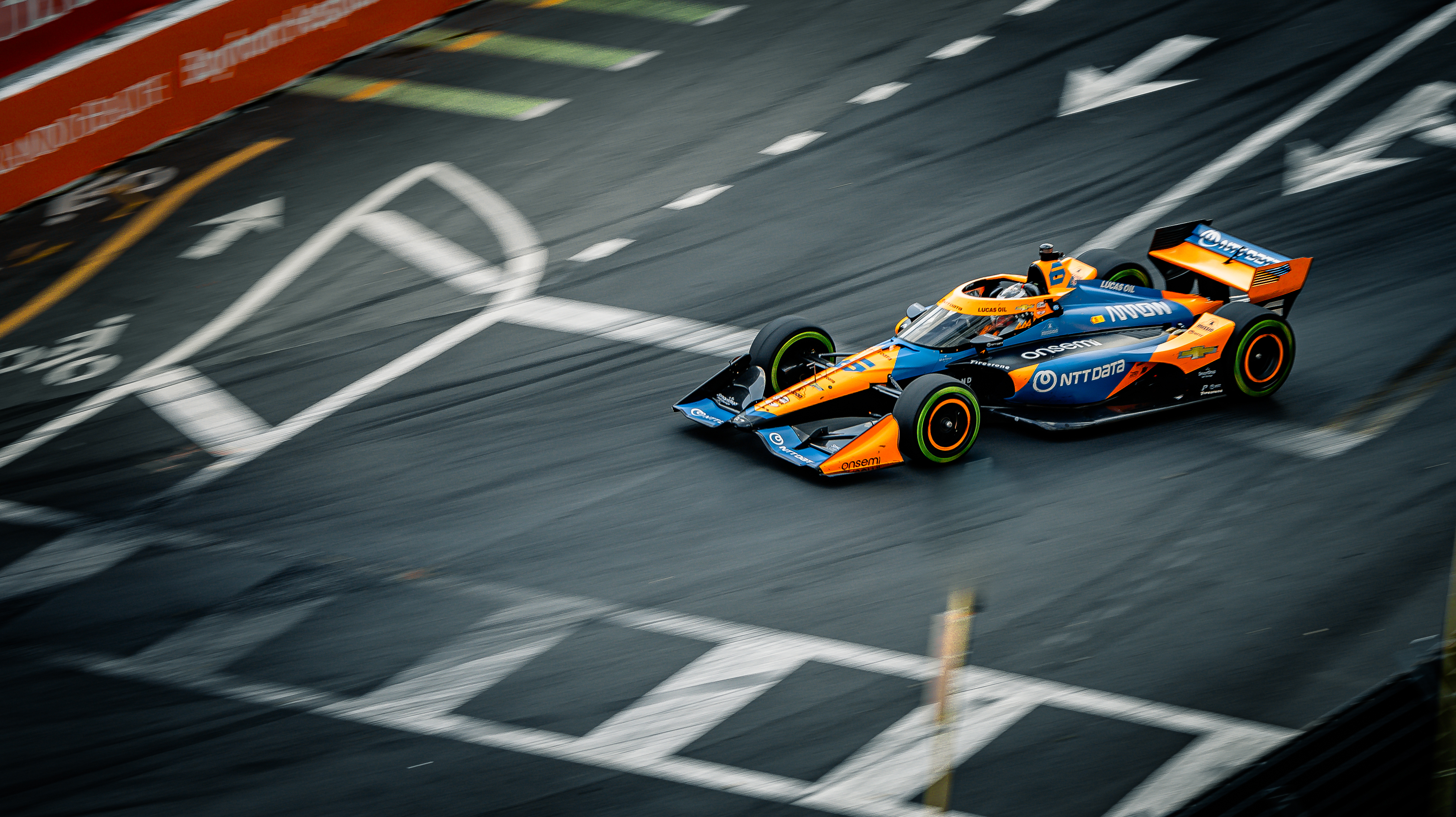
Ilott at the 2024 Firestone Grand Prix of St. Petersburg

Ilott made a brief appearance in the 2024 season with Arrow McLaren, driving at the opening race in St. Petersburg, whilst deputising for David Malukas who suffered a wrist injury in a mountain biking accident. Ilott also drove in the 2024 Indianapolis 500 after Malukas was released from the Arrow McLaren team in late-April, finishing in eleventh. Ilott also helped Arrow McLaren test the hybrid system.

=== Prema (2025) ===
In September 2024, it was announced that Ilott would compete in the 2025 season with Prema Racing full-time, being paired with Robert Shwartzman. Ilott finished in 12th place at the 2025 Indy 500, after starting in 21st. However, on the following day, he was later demoted to last place, after it was discovered that his front wing did not meet the minimum wing endplate height and location requirements. Ilott would later record the team's best result of the season with back-to-back 6th place finishes at Laguna Seca and Portland. He would end the season seven points behind his teammate.

Ilott was due to continue with Prema for the 2026 season. But the team were omitted from the entry list, as a result of the team's financial difficulties and the departure of the Rosin family in January.

== Sports car career ==
=== 2021 ===
==== GT World Challenge Europe Endurance Cup ====
In February 2021, Ilott signed with Italian outfit Iron Lynx to compete in the 2021 GT World Challenge Europe Endurance Cup, driving the No. 71 Ferrari 488 GT3 alongside fellow Ferrari Driver Academy member Antonio Fuoco and Italian driver Davide Rigon.

==== 24 Hours of Le Mans ====
Ilott made his 24 Hours of Le Mans debut in the 2021 edition with Iron Lynx, driving the No. 80 Ferrari 488 GTE alongside Italian drivers Matteo Cressoni and Rino Mastronardi. Ilott replaced Andrea Piccini for the race, as Piccini chose to step away from driving and focus on his duties as Iron Lynx team principal. He achieved a podium in his first outing, finishing third in the GTE Am class and 27th overall.

==== Intercontinental GT Challenge ====
Ilott contested the first round of the 2021 Intercontinental GT Challenge, the 24 Hours of Spa, with Iron Lynx Motorsport Lab in the No. 71 Ferrari 488 GT3. Their race ended prematurely, as the No. 71 was involved in a four-car accident during lap ten. In a bid to win the Manufacturer's championship for the first time, Ferrari announced in October 2021 that they would contest the remaining two rounds of the three-round championship. Ilott, alongside Antonio Fuoco and Alessio Rovera (later replaced by Davide Rigon), were announced as drivers in the No. 71 Ferrari entry for the 2021 Indianapolis 8 Hours, this time racing with AF Corse.

=== 2024 ===
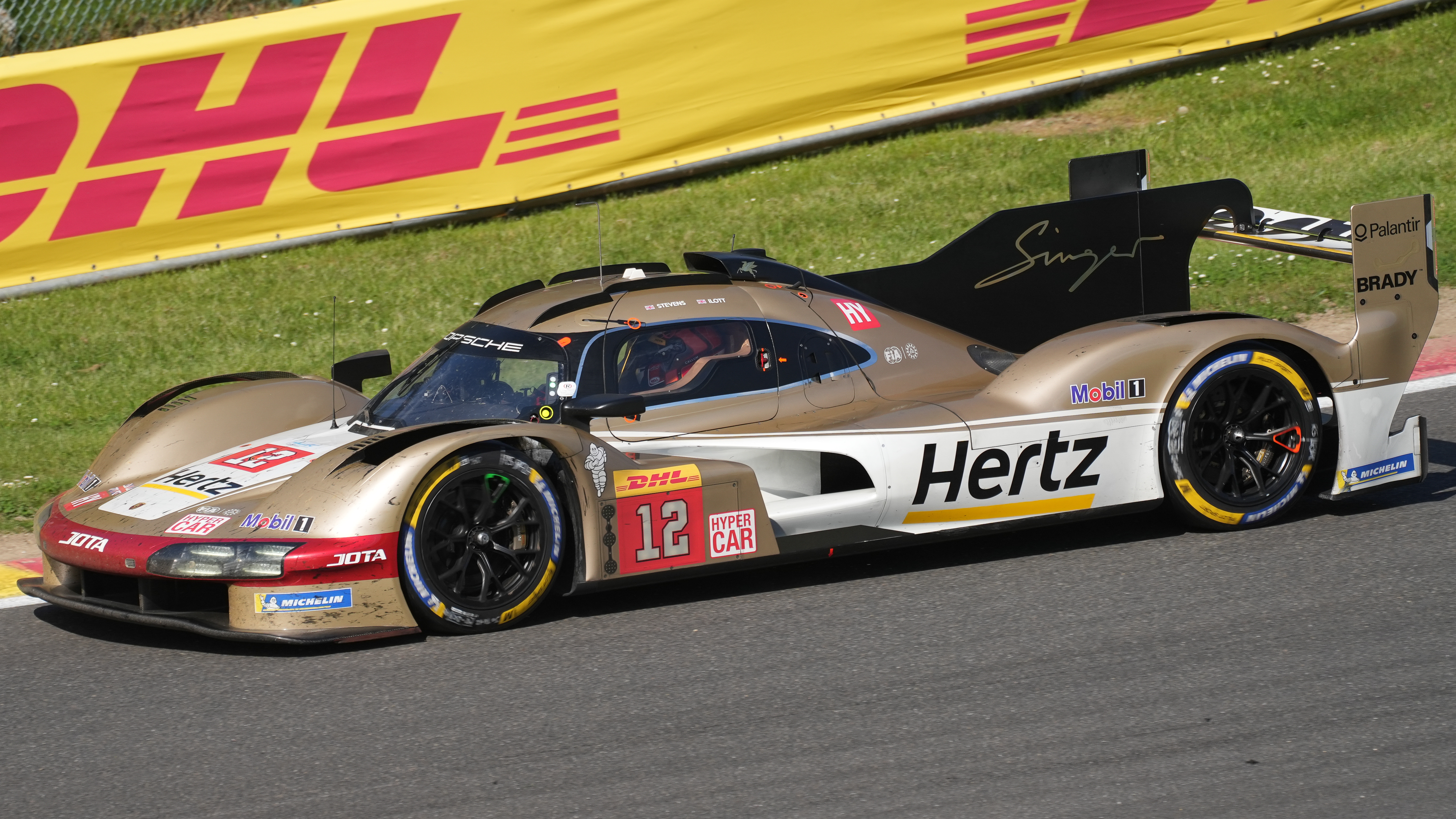
Ilott competing for Hertz Team Jota at the 2024 6 Hours of Spa-Francorchamps.

After failing to secure a full-time IndyCar seat for 2024 having been dropped by Juncos Hollinger Racing last minute, Ilott moved to the FIA World Endurance Championship for his campaign, piloting the No. 12 car for Jota Sport sponsored by Tom Brady, alongside Norman Nato and Will Stevens. The team would score their maiden top-class podium during the first race in Qatar, after battling for podium positions throughout the race and the Peugeot breaking down before the finish, helping the team secure second-place finish in the race to start the season on a high. Two rounds later Ilott, together with his teammate Will Stevens, got his first win at Spa-Francorchamps after a mid-race red flag. This also marked the first win in hypercar for Jota. After the win, an unlucky streak struck Ilott. He showed great speeds in the qualifying sessions, always starting off the weekend on a high but continuing with the lowest lows, like crashing out in the last minute of the second practice of Le Mans, leading to the complete change of chassis in mere days, which not only made the team miss Hyperpole but also start on the backfoot. The team however went on to finish eighth, which was their original starting position, strongly contesting the whole race without any big troubles. He then crashed out of the race at the 6 hours of São Paulo after coming out of the pits, sending the car back into the garage, leading them to finish last in class. The unfortunate events followed him to the Circuit of the Americas, where the car suffered an electrical issue two hours into the race, which they couldn't fix in time. The Jota squad took the FIA World Cup title after finishing fifth during the 6 hours of Fuji, finishing as the first privateer car.

=== 2026 ===
==== IMSA Championship ====
Ilott joined Wright Motorsports to compete in the 2026 IMSA SportsCar Championship, driving the no.120 Porsche 911 GT3 R.

== Karting record ==
=== Karting career summary ===
Season	Series	Team	Position
2008	Super 1 National Championship — Honda Cadet		21st
2009	Super 1 National Championship — Honda Cadet		4th
2009	Super 1 National Championship — Comer Cadet		13th
2009	MSA Kartmasters Grand Prix — Comer Cadet		9th
2010	Formula Kart Stars MSA — Cadet		6th
2010	Super 1 National Championship — Comer Cadet		10th
2010	WSK Master Series — 60 Mini	AB Motorsport Racing Team	19th
2010	WSK Nations Cup — 60 Mini		29th
2010	Copa Campeones Trophy — Cadet		3rd
2011	Trofeo Grifone — 60 Mini		4th
2011	Andrea Margutti Trophy — 60 Mini	Luxor Racing Team	20th
2011	Formula Kart Stars — KF3		1st
2011	German Karting Championship — Junior	Keijzer Racing	3rd
2011	Copa Campeones Trophy — KF3		10th
2011	WSK Euro Series — KF3	Chiesa Corse	119th
2011	Grand Prix Open Karting — KF3		43rd
2011	CIK-FIA World Cup — KF3	Chiesa Corse	26th
2011	WSK Master Series — KF3		NC
2011	Italian CSAI Championship — KF3		11th
2012	South Garda Winter Cup — KF3	Chiesa Corse	10th
2012	Silver Cup — KF3	Chiesa Corse	1st
2012	WSK Master Series — KF3	Chiesa Corse	1st
2012	Championnat de France — KF3	Chiesa Corse	NC
2012	CIK-FIA European Championship — KF3	Chiesa Corse	19th
2012	WSK Euro Series — KF3	Chiesa Corse	2nd
2012	CIK-FIA World Cup — KF3	Chiesa Corse	2nd
2012	WSK Final Cup — KF3	Chiesa Corse	1st
2012	Trofeo delle Industrie — KF3	Chiesa Corse	1st
2012	Grand Prix Open Karting — KF3	Chiesa Corse	
2013	WSK Euro Series — KF	Team Oakes	14th
2013	WSK Super Master Series — KF	Team Oakes	7th
2013	CIK-FIA European Championship — KF	Team Oakes	15th
2013	CIK-FIA World Championship — KF	Team Oakes	38th
2013	Trofeo delle Industrie — KF2	Chiesa Corse	1st
2013	Italian CSAI Championship — KF2	Chiesa Corse	4th
2013	WSK Final Cup — KF	Chiesa Corse	1st
2014	WSK Champions Cup — KF	Zanardi Strakka Racing	3rd
2014	WSK Super Master Series — KF	Zanardi Strakka Racing	1st
2014	CIK-FIA European Championship — KF	Zanardi Strakka Racing	1st
2014	CIK-FIA World Championship — KF	Zanardi Strakka Racing	4th
2014	CIK-FIA World Championship — KZ	Zanardi Strakka Racing	20th

== Racing record ==
=== Racing career summary ===
Season	Series	Team	Races	Wins	Poles	F/Laps	Podiums	Points	Position
2015	FIA Formula 3 European Championship	Carlin	33	0	0	0	1	65.5	12th
2015	Masters of Formula 3	Carlin	1	0	0	0	0	N/A	8th
2015	Macau Grand Prix	Carlin	1	0	0	0	0	N/A	DNF
2015	Toyota Racing Series	ETEC Motorsport	16	0	0	1	0	358	16th
2016	FIA Formula 3 European Championship	Van Amersfoort Racing	30	2	2	3	6	226	6th
2016	Masters of Formula 3	Van Amersfoort Racing	1	0	0	0	0	N/A	4th
2016	Macau Grand Prix	Van Amersfoort Racing	1	0	0	0	0	N/A	5th
2017	FIA Formula 3 European Championship	Prema Powerteam	30	6	10	9	11	344	4th
2017	Macau Grand Prix	Theodore Racing by Prema	1	0	1	0	0	N/A	15th
2017	FIA Formula 2 Championship	Trident	2	0	0	0	0	0	26th
2018	GP3 Series	ART Grand Prix	18	2	1	2	7	167	**3rd**
2018	Macau Grand Prix	Carlin	1	0	0	0	0	N/A	7th
2019	FIA Formula 2 Championship	Sauber Junior Team by Charouz	21	0	1	0	2	74	11th
2019	Macau Grand Prix	Sauber Junior Team by Charouz	1	0	0	0	0	N/A	6th
2019	Formula One	Alfa Romeo Racing	Test driver						
2020	FIA Formula 2 Championship	UNI-Virtuosi Racing	24	3	5	0	6	201	**2nd**
2020	Formula One	Haas F1 Team	Test driver						
2020	Formula One	Alfa Romeo Racing Orlen	Test driver						
2021	GT World Challenge Europe Endurance Cup	Iron Lynx	5	0	0	1	0	27	11th
2021	24 Hours of Le Mans - LMGTE Am	Iron Lynx	1	0	0	0	1	N/A	**3rd**
2021	Intercontinental GT Challenge	Iron Lynx Motorsport Lab	1	0	0	0	0	0	NC
2021	Intercontinental GT Challenge	AF Corse - Francorchamps Motors	1	0	0	0	0	0	NC
2021	IndyCar Series	Juncos Hollinger Racing	3	0	0	0	0	18	38th
2021	Formula One	Scuderia Ferrari	Test driver						
2021	Formula One	Alfa Romeo Racing Orlen	Reserve driver						
2022	IndyCar Series	Juncos Hollinger Racing	16	0	0	0	0	219	20th
2022	Formula One	Alfa Romeo F1 Team Orlen	Reserve driver						
2023	IndyCar Series	Juncos Hollinger Racing	17	0	0	0	0	266	16th
2023	GT World Challenge America - Pro-Am	Wright Motorsports	1	0	0	0	1	0	NC†
2024	FIA World Endurance Championship - Hypercar	Hertz Team Jota	8	1	0	0	2	70	7th
2024	24 Hours of Le Mans - Hypercar	Hertz Team Jota	1	0	0	0	0	N/A	8th
2024	IndyCar Series	Arrow McLaren	2	0	0	0	0	39	33rd
2025	IndyCar Series	Prema Racing	17	0	0	0	0	218	21st
2025	IMSA SportsCar Championship - LMP2	Pratt Miller Motorsports	1	0	0	0	0	248	53rd
2026	IMSA SportsCar Championship - GTD	Wright Motorsports	10	0	0	0	2	2387	7th

^{†} As Ilott was a guest driver, he was ineligible for points.
* Season still in progress.

=== Complete Toyota Racing Series results ===
(key) (Races in bold indicate pole position) (Races in italics indicate fastest lap)

Year	Team	1	2	3	4	5	6	7	8	9	10	11	12	13	14	15	16	DC	Points
2015	ETEC Motorsport	RUA; 1; 16	RUA; 2 NC	RUA; 3 Ret	TER; 1; 15	TER; 2; 14	TER; 3 Ret	HMP; 1; 4	HMP; 2; 12	HMP; 3; 17	TAU; 1 Ret	TAU; 2; 12	TAU; 3; 12	TAU; 4; 12	MAN; 1; 4	MAN; 2; 4	MAN; 3 Ret	16th	358

=== Complete FIA Formula 3 European Championship results ===
(key) (Races in bold indicate pole position) (Races in italics indicate fastest lap)

Year	Entrant	Engine	1	2	3	4	5	6	7	8	9	10	11	12	13	14	15	16	17	18	19	20	21	22	23	24	25	26	27	28	29	30	31	32	33	DC	Points
2015	Carlin	Volkswagen	SIL; 1; 10	SIL; 2; 19	SIL; 3; 9	HOC; 1; 13	HOC; 2; 5	HOC; 3; 10	PAU; 1; 11	PAU; 2; 15	PAU; 3; 16	MNZ; 1; 20	MNZ; 2; 14	MNZ; 3; 15	SPA; 1; 14	SPA; 2; 11	SPA; 3; 4	NOR; 1; 11	NOR; 2; 16	NOR; 3; 7	ZAN; 1; 11	ZAN; 2; 12	ZAN; 3; 22	RBR; 1; 30	RBR; 2; 12	RBR; 3; 10	ALG; 1; 16	ALG; 2; 26†	ALG; 3; 11	NÜR; 1; 3	NÜR; 2; 9	NÜR; 3; 8	HOC; 1; 15	HOC; 2; 11	HOC; 3; 5	12th	65.5
2016	Van Amersfoort Racing	Mercedes	LEC; 1; 10	LEC; 2; 1	LEC; 3; 12	HUN; 1 Ret	HUN; 2; 9	HUN; 3; 6	PAU; 1; 5	PAU; 2; 3	PAU; 3; 4	**RBR**; **1**; 1	RBR; 2; 4	RBR; 3; 2	NOR; 1 Ret	NOR; 2; 7	NOR; 3; 7	ZAN; 1; 5	**ZAN**; **2**; 3	ZAN; 3; 6	SPA; 1; 16	SPA; 2; 5	SPA; 3 Ret	NÜR; 1; 5	NÜR; 2; 7	NÜR; 3; 4	IMO; 1; 15	IMO; 2 Ret	IMO; 3; 3	HOC; 1 Ret	HOC; 2 DSQ	HOC; 3 Ret				6th	226
2017	Prema Powerteam	Mercedes	SIL; 1 Ret	**SIL**; **2**; 2	**SIL**; **3**; 1	MNZ; 1; 9	MNZ; 2; 7	MNZ; 3; 1	**PAU**; **1** Ret	PAU; 2; 3	PAU; 3; 2	HUN; 1; 5	**HUN**; **2**; 1	HUN; 3; 2	NOR; 1 Ret	NOR; 2; 9	NOR; 3; 9	SPA; 1; 14	SPA; 2; 6	**SPA**; **3**; 4	ZAN; 1; 5	**ZAN**; **2**; 1	ZAN; 3; 19	NÜR; 1; 4	NÜR; 2; 3	**NÜR**; **3**; 4	**RBR**; **1**; 1	RBR; 2; 4	RBR; 3 Ret	**HOC**; **1**; 4	**HOC**; **2**; 1	HOC; 3; 5				4th	344

^{†} Driver did not finish the race but was classified as he completed over 90% of the race distance.

=== Complete Masters of Formula 3 results ===
Year	Team	Car	Qualifying	Quali Race	Main race
2015	(United Kingdom) Carlin	Dallara F312	9th	14th	8th
2016	(Netherlands) Van Amersfoort Racing	Dallara F312	**1st**	**2nd**	4th

=== Complete Macau Grand Prix results ===
Year	Team	Car	Qualifying	Quali Race	Main race
2015	(United Kingdom) Carlin	Dallara F312	18th	DNF	DNF
2016	(Netherlands) Van Amersfoort Racing	Dallara F312	**2nd**	**2nd**	5th
2017	(Italy) Prema Powerteam	Dallara F317	**3rd**	**1st**	15th
2018	(United Kingdom) Carlin	Dallara F317	**2nd**	**3rd**	7th
2019	(Czech Republic) Sauber Junior Team by Charouz	Dallara F3 2019	**3rd**	5th	6th

=== Complete GP3 Series results ===
(key) (Races in bold indicate pole position) (Races in italics indicate fastest lap)

Year	Entrant	1	2	3	4	5	6	7	8	9	10	11	12	13	14	15	16	17	18	Pos	Points
2018	ART Grand Prix	CAT; FEA; 3	CAT; SPR; 7	LEC; FEA; 8	LEC; SPR; 1	**RBR**; **FEA**; 1	RBR; SPR; 6	SIL; FEA; 3	SIL; SPR; 5	HUN; FEA; 6	HUN; SPR; 2	SPA; FEA; 6	SPA; SPR; 3	MNZ; FEA; 3	MNZ; SPR; DSQ	SOC; FEA; 13	SOC; SPR; 18	YMC; FEA; 4	YMC; SPR; 4	3rd	167

=== Complete FIA Formula 2 Championship results ===
(key) (Races in bold indicate pole position) (Races in italics indicate points for the fastest lap of top ten finishers)

Year	Entrant	1	2	3	4	5	6	7	8	9	10	11	12	13	14	15	16	17	18	19	20	21	22	23	24	DC	Points
2017	Trident	BHR; FEA	BHR; SPR	CAT; FEA	CAT; SPR	MON; FEA	MON; SPR	BAK; FEA	BAK; SPR	RBR; FEA	RBR; SPR	SIL; FEA; 19	SIL; SPR; 14	HUN; FEA	HUN; SPR	SPA; FEA	SPA; SPR	MNZ; FEA	MNZ; SPR	JER; FEA	JER; SPR	YMC; FEA	YMC; SPR			26th	0
2019	Sauber Junior Team by Charouz	BHR; FEA; 14	BHR; SPR; 16	BAK; FEA; Ret	BAK; SPR; 9	CAT; FEA; 8	CAT; SPR; 3	MON; FEA; DNS	MON; SPR; 14	LEC; FEA; Ret	LEC; SPR; 8	RBR; FEA; 14	RBR; SPR; 9	SIL; FEA; 8	SIL; SPR; 4	HUN; FEA; 10	HUN; SPR; 10	SPA; FEA; C	SPA; SPR; C	**MNZ**; **FEA**; 4	MNZ; SPR; 12	SOC; FEA; 9	SOC; SPR; 3	YMC; FEA; 5	YMC; SPR; 4	11th	74
2020	UNI-Virtuosi Racing	RBR1; FEA; 1	RBR1; SPR; 9	RBR2; FEA; 5	RBR2; SPR; 5	**HUN**; **FEA**; 8	HUN; SPR; 2	SIL1; FEA; 5	SIL1; SPR; Ret	**SIL2**; **FEA**; 1	SIL2; SPR; 6	**CAT**; **FEA**; 5	CAT; SPR; 8	SPA; FEA; 10	SPA; SPR; Ret	**MNZ**; **FEA**; 6	MNZ; SPR; 1	MUG; FEA; 12	MUG; SPR; 6	SOC; FEA; 3	SOC; SPR; 7‡	**BHR1**; **FEA**; 2	BHR1; SPR; 16	BHR2; FEA; 5	BHR2; SPR; 10	2nd	201

^{‡} Half points were awarded as less than 75% of the scheduled race distance was completed.

=== Complete Formula One participations ===
(key) (Races in bold indicate pole position) (Races in italics indicate fastest lap)

Year	Entrant	Chassis	Engine	1	2	3	4	5	6	7	8	9	10	11	12	13	14	15	16	17	18	19	20	21	22	WDC	Points
2020	Haas F1 Team	Haas VF-20	Ferrari 065 1.6 V6 t	AUT	STY	HUN	GBR	70th	ESP	BEL	ITA	TUS	RUS	EIF; TD (Note: Ilott was scheduled to take part in the first practice session as a test driver but the session was cancelled due to bad weather.)	POR	EMI	TUR	BHR	SKH	ABU						–	–
2021	Alfa Romeo Racing Orlen	Alfa Romeo Racing C41	Ferrari 065/6 1.6 V6 t	BHR	EMI	POR; TD	ESP	MON	AZE	FRA	STY	AUT; TD	GBR	HUN	BEL	NED	ITA	RUS	TUR	USA	MXC	SAP	QAT	SAU	ABU	–	–

=== Complete GT World Challenge Europe Endurance results ===
(key) (Races in bold indicate pole position; races in italics indicate fastest lap)

Year	Entrant	Car	1	2	3	4	5	Pos	Points
2021	Iron Lynx	Ferrari 488 GT3	MNZ; 4	LEC; 4	SPA; NC	NÜR; 38	CAT; 39	11th	27

=== Complete 24 Hours of Le Mans results ===
Year	Team	Co-Drivers	Car	Class	Laps	Pos.	Class Pos.
2021	(Italy) Iron Lynx	(Italy) Matteo Cressoni (Italy) Rino Mastronardi	Ferrari 488 GTE Evo	GTE; Am	338	27th	**3rd**
2024	(United Kingdom) Hertz Team Jota	(France) Norman Nato (United Kingdom) Will Stevens	Porsche 963	Hypercar	311	8th	8th

=== American open-wheel racing results ===
==== IndyCar Series ====
(key)

Year	Team	No.	Chassis	Engine	1	2	3	4	5	6	7	8	9	10	11	12	13	14	15	16	17	18	Rank	Points	Ref
2021	Juncos Hollinger Racing	77	Dallara DW12	Chevrolet	ALA	STP	TXS	TXS	IMS	INDY	DET	DET	ROA	MOH	NSH	IMS	GTW	POR; 25	LAG; 22	LBH; 26			38th	18	
2022	Juncos Hollinger Racing	77	Dallara DW12	Chevrolet	STP; 19	TXS; 16	LBH; 24	ALA; 25	IMS; 8	INDY; 32	DET	ROA; 11	MOH; 23	TOR; 14	IOW; 12	IOW; 11	IMS; 14	NSH; 15	GTW; 21	POR; 9	LAG; 26		20th	219	
2023	Juncos Hollinger Racing	77	Dallara DW12	Chevrolet	STP; 5	TXS; 9	LBH; 19	ALA; 13	IMS; 18	INDY; 12	DET; 27	ROA; 18	MOH; 16	TOR; 18	IOW; 15	IOW; 14	NSH; 12	IMS; 17	GTW; 27	POR; 15	LAG; 5		16th	266	
2024	Arrow McLaren	6	Dallara DW12	Chevrolet	STP; 11	THE; DNQ	LBH	ALA	IMS	INDY; 11	DET	ROA	LAG	MOH	IOW	IOW	TOR	GTW	POR	MIL	MIL	NSH	33rd	39	
2025	Prema Racing	90	Dallara DW12	Chevrolet	STP; 19	THE; 26	LBH; 21	ALA; 23	IMS; 22	INDY; 33	DET; 26	GTW; 18	ROA; 15	MOH; 13	IOW; 23	IOW; 21	TOR; 8	LAG; 6	POR; 6	MIL; 25	NSH; 9		21st	218	

==== Indianapolis 500 ====
Year	Chassis	Engine	Start	Finish	Team
2022	Dallara	Chevrolet	19	32	Juncos Hollinger Racing
2023	Dallara	Chevrolet	27	12	Juncos Hollinger Racing
2024	Dallara	Chevrolet	15	11	Arrow McLaren
2025	Dallara	Chevrolet	21	33	Prema Racing

=== Complete FIA World Endurance Championship results ===
(key) (Races in bold indicate pole position) (Races in italics indicate fastest lap)

Year	Entrant	Class	Chassis	Engine	1	2	3	4	5	6	7	8	Rank	Points
2024	Hertz Team Jota	Hypercar	Porsche 963	Porsche 9RD 4.6 L Turbo V8	QAT; 2	IMO; 14	SPA; 1	LMS; 8	SÃO; 18	COA; Ret	FUJ; 5	BHR; 13	7th	70

=== Complete IMSA SportsCar Championship Results ===
(key) (Races in bold indicate pole position; races in italics indicate fastest lap)

Year	Team	Class	Make	Engine	1	2	3	4	5	6	7	8	9	10	Rank	Points
2025	Pratt Miller Motorsports	LMP2	Oreca 07	Gibson GK428 4.2 L V8	DAY; 9	SEB	WGL	MOS	ELK	IMS	PET				53rd	248
2026	Wright Motorsports	GTD	Porsche 911 GT3 R (992)	Porsche M97/80 4.2 L Flat-6	DAY; 20	SEB; 3	LBH; 15	LGA; 4	WGL; 2	MOS; 9	ELK; 17	VIR; 10	IMS; 6	PET; 7	7th	2387
