= 2021 Grand Prix of Portland =

14th round of the 2021 IndyCar Series

(United States) 2021 Grand Prix of Portland
Race details
14th round of the 2021 IndyCar season
← Previous race	Next race →
- Layout of the Portland International Raceway
- Date: September 12, 2021
- Official name: Grand Prix of Portland
- Location: Portland International Raceway, Portland, Oregon
- Course: Permanent racing facility 1.964 mi / 3.142 km
- Distance: 110 laps 206.220 mi / 329.952 km
- Weather: Sunny with partly cloudy skies 82 °F (28 °C)

Pole position
- Driver: (Spain) Álex Palou (Chip Ganassi Racing)
- Time: 00:58.7701

Fastest lap
- Driver: (France) Romain Grosjean (Dale Coyne Racing with Rick Ware Racing)
- Time: 00:59.4381 (on lap 83 of 110)

Podium
- First: (Spain) Álex Palou (Chip Ganassi Racing)
- Second: (United States) Alexander Rossi (Andretti Autosport)
- Third: (New Zealand) Scott Dixon (Chip Ganassi Racing)

The 2021 Grand Prix of Portland was an IndyCar motor race held on September 12, 2021 at the Portland International Raceway. It was the 14th round of the 2021 IndyCar Series season.

The race was won by Álex Palou, who started on pole, with Alexander Rossi finishing second and Scott Dixon third.

== Background ==
The event was held over the weekend of September 11-12, 2021 at the Portland International Raceway in Portland, Oregon. It marked the return of the circuit to the calendar, as the race was canceled in the year prior due to the COVID-19 pandemic.

The race was the 14th race of the 16-race season. It was held three weeks after the Bommarito Automotive Group 500 at the World Wide Technology Raceway in Madison, Illinois, which was the last oval race of the season, and was the first of three races in the triple-header finale, which continued in the Firestone Grand Prix of Monterey at Laguna Seca (September 19) and culminated in the Acura Grand Prix of Long Beach at the Long Beach street circuit (September 26).

Will Power was the previous race winner, having won the 2019 event.

=== Championship standings before the race ===
Pato O'Ward returned to the top of the driver standings with a ten-point lead, after he finished second in the Bommarito Automotive Group 500, where championship rival Álex Palou crashed out, losing out again on a large points haul following the premature end of his race in the Big Machine Spiked Coolers Grand Prix. Josef Newgarden climbed up to third following his race win at Gateway, demoting Scott Dixon to fourth, above his teammate Marcus Ericsson, who sat fifth.

Honda retained their lead of the manufacturer standings over Chevrolet.

=== Entrants ===
27 drivers entered the race, including IndyCar Series debutant Callum Ilott, driving for Juncos Hollinger Racing, who return to the series after being absent in the 2020 season.

The race also marked Oliver Askew's first race for Rahal Letterman Lanigan Racing.

Key	Meaning
R	Rookie
W	Past winner

No.	Driver	Team	Engine
2	(United States) Josef Newgarden	Team Penske	Chevrolet
3	(New Zealand) Scott McLaughlin R	Team Penske	Chevrolet
4	(Canada) Dalton Kellett	A. J. Foyt Enterprises	Chevrolet
5	(Mexico) Patricio O'Ward	Arrow McLaren SP	Chevrolet
06	(Brazil) Hélio Castroneves	Meyer Shank Racing	Honda
7	(Sweden) Felix Rosenqvist	Arrow McLaren SP	Chevrolet
8	(Sweden) Marcus Ericsson	Chip Ganassi Racing	Honda
9	(New Zealand) Scott Dixon	Chip Ganassi Racing	Honda
10	(Spain) Álex Palou	Chip Ganassi Racing	Honda
12	(Australia) Will Power W	Team Penske	Chevrolet
14	(France) Sébastien Bourdais	A. J. Foyt Enterprises	Chevrolet
15	(United States) Graham Rahal	Rahal Letterman Lanigan Racing	Honda
18	(United Arab Emirates) Ed Jones	Dale Coyne Racing with Vasser-Sullivan	Honda
20	(United States) Conor Daly	Ed Carpenter Racing	Chevrolet
21	(Netherlands) Rinus VeeKay	Ed Carpenter Racing	Chevrolet
22	(France) Simon Pagenaud	Team Penske	Chevrolet
26	(United States) Colton Herta	Andretti Autosport with Curb-Agajanian	Honda
27	(United States) Alexander Rossi	Andretti Autosport	Honda
28	(United States) Ryan Hunter-Reay	Andretti Autosport	Honda
29	(Canada) James Hinchcliffe	Andretti Steinbrenner Autosport	Honda
30	(Japan) Takuma Sato W	Rahal Letterman Lanigan Racing	Honda
45	(United States) Oliver Askew	Rahal Letterman Lanigan Racing	Honda
48	(United States) Jimmie Johnson R	Chip Ganassi Racing	Honda
51	(France) Romain Grosjean R	Dale Coyne Racing with Rick Ware Racing	Honda
59	(United Kingdom) Max Chilton	Carlin	Chevrolet
60	(United Kingdom) Jack Harvey	Meyer Shank Racing	Honda
77	(United Kingdom) Callum Ilott R	Juncos Hollinger Racing	Chevrolet

== Practice ==
Practice 1 took place at 12:00 PM ET on September 11. Only one pre-qualifying practice session was held. Álex Palou set the fastest time, after spinning out of track halfway through the session, though no damage was suffered. Meyer Shank Racing drivers Hélio Castroneves and Jack Harvey set the second and third fastest time respectively.

Top Practice Speeds
Pos	No.	Driver	Team	Engine	Lap Time
1	10	(Spain) Álex Palou	Chip Ganassi Racing	Honda	00:58.7824
2	06	(Brazil) Hélio Castroneves	Meyer Shank Racing	Honda	00:58.8850
3	60	(United Kingdom) Jack Harvey	Meyer Shank Racing	Honda	00:58.8887

== Qualifying ==
Qualifying took place at 3:15 PM ET on September 11. Álex Palou won pole position with a time of 00:58.7701, ahead of Alexander Rossi in second and Scott Dixon in third.

=== Qualifying classification ===
Pos	No.	Driver	Team	Engine	Time				Final grid
Pos	No.	Driver	Team	Engine	Round 1		Round 2	Round 3	Final grid
Pos	No.	Driver	Team	Engine	Group 1	Group 2	Round 2	Round 3	Final grid
1	10	(Spain) Álex Palou	Chip Ganassi Racing	Honda	N/A	00:58.7971	**00:58.7691**	**00:58.7701**	1
2	27	(United States) Alexander Rossi	Andretti Autosport	Honda	00:59.0177	N/A	00:58.9571	00:58.8573	2
3	9	(New Zealand) Scott Dixon	Chip Ganassi Racing	Honda	N/A	00:58.8684	00:58.8200	00:58.8673	3
4	7	(Sweden) Felix Rosenqvist	Arrow McLaren SP	Chevrolet	N/A	**00:58.6912**	00:58.9629	00:58.9505	4
5	15	(United States) Graham Rahal	Rahal Letterman Lanigan Racing	Honda	00:58.9369	N/A	00:58.9338	00:59.0067	5
6	26	(United States) Colton Herta	Andretti Autosport with Curb-Agajanian	Honda	N/A	00:58.8450	00:58.9459	00:59.2796	6
7	5	(Mexico) Pato O'Ward	Arrow McLaren SP	Chevrolet	00:59.2142	N/A	00:58.9732	N/A	7
8	18	(United Arab Emirates) Ed Jones	Dale Coyne Racing with Vasser-Sullivan	Honda	N/A	00:58.9330	00:59.0247	N/A	8
9	45	(United States) Oliver Askew	Rahal Letterman Lanigan Racing	Honda	00:59.1960	N/A	00:59.0837	N/A	9
10	8	(Sweden) Marcus Ericsson	Chip Ganassi Racing	Honda	**00:58.8094**	N/A	00:59.0901	N/A	10
11	59	(United Kingdom) Max Chilton	Carlin	Chevrolet	00:59.0735	N/A	00:59.2346	N/A	11
12	14	(France) Sébastien Bourdais	A. J. Foyt Enterprises	Chevrolet	N/A	00:58.9390	00:59.2419	N/A	12
13	29	(Canada) James Hinchcliffe	Andretti Steinbrenner Autosport	Honda	00:59.2537	N/A	N/A	N/A	13
14	12	(Australia) Will Power **W**	Team Penske	Chevrolet	N/A	00:59.0032	N/A	N/A	14
15	3	(New Zealand) Scott McLaughlin **R**	Chip Ganassi Racing	Honda	00:59.3563	N/A	N/A	N/A	15
16	20	(United States) Conor Daly	Ed Carpenter Racing	Chevrolet	N/A	00:59.0974	N/A	N/A	16
17	06	(Brazil) Hélio Castroneves	Meyer Shank Racing	Honda	00:59.4190	N/A	N/A	N/A	17
18	2	(United States) Josef Newgarden	Team Penske	Chevrolet	N/A	00:59.1371	N/A	N/A	18
19	77	(United Kingdom) Callum Ilott **R**	Juncos Hollinger Racing	Chevrolet	00:59.5008	N/A	N/A	N/A	19
20	60	(United Kingdom) Jack Harvey	Meyer Shank Racing	Honda	N/A	00:59.1463	N/A	N/A	20
21	51	(France) Romain Grosjean **R**	Dale Coyne Racing with Rick Ware Racing	Honda	00:59.6344^{1}	N/A	N/A	N/A	21
22	21	(Netherlands) Rinus VeeKay	Ed Carpenter Racing	Chevrolet	N/A	00:59.1885	N/A	N/A	25^{2}
23	48	(United States) Jimmie Johnson **R**	Chip Ganassi Racing	Honda	00:59.7120	N/A	N/A	N/A	22
24	30	(Japan) Takuma Sato **W**	Rahal Letterman Lanigan Racing	Honda	N/A	00:59.1953	N/A	N/A	26^{3}
25	28	(United States) Ryan Hunter-Reay	Andretti Autosport	Honda	No Time	N/A	N/A	N/A	27^{4}
26	22	(France) Simon Pagenaud	Team Penske	Chevrolet	N/A	00:59.6591	N/A	N/A	23
27	4	(Canada) Dalton Kellett	A. J. Foyt Enterprises	Chevrolet	N/A	00:59.7438	N/A	N/A	24

Notes

- **Bold text** indicates fastest time set in session.
- **^1** - Romain Grosjean initially finished seventh in Group 1, but had two of his fastest times deleted due to a penalty for interference, dropping him down to eleventh.
- **^2** - Rinus VeeKay was given a six-place grid penalty due to an unscheduled engine change, following his crash at the Bommarito Automotive Group 500.
- **^3** - Takuma Sato was given a grid penalty due to an unscheduled engine change, following engine problems at Practice 1.
- **^4** - Ryan Hunter-Reay was handed a grid penalty due to an unscheduled engine change, after experiencing engine issues that led him to be unable to set a time in qualifying.

== Final Practice ==
Final Practice took place at 6:15 PM ET on September 11. This session was held after the qualifying sessions. The session ended with no major incidents. Scott Dixon set the fastest time, with Josef Newgarden in second and Ed Jones in third.

Top Practice Speeds
Pos	No.	Driver	Team	Engine	Lap Time
1	9	(New Zealand) Scott Dixon	Chip Ganassi Racing	Honda	00:59.4111
2	2	(United States) Josef Newgarden	Team Penske	Chevrolet	00:59.6296
3	18	(United Arab Emirates) Ed Jones	Dale Coyne Racing with Vasser-Sullivan	Honda	00:59.6403

== Race ==
The race started on 3:00 PM ET on September 12. The start of the race was marked with a chaotic dash into Turn 1, which caused several drivers to make contact. As a result, James Hinchcliffe had to retire from the race, and the first caution of the day was brought out, with Pato O'Ward taking the lead in lap 1. The race resumed in lap 10 and O'Ward led for 29 laps, until he entered the pits. Graham Rahal inherited the lead from O'Ward. The race lead was subsequently held by numerous drivers as the race continued, until it fell again to Rahal on lap 44.

On lap 52, as Rahal led the race, Dalton Kellett and IndyCar debutant Callum Ilott each went off-track, in Turn 1 and Turn 7 respectively, due to mechanical issues, which brought out the second caution of the race. The race resumed after 5 laps of caution. The race lead continued to cycle through several drivers, as Will Power and Simon Pagenaud made contact in Turn 7, which brought out the race's third caution in lap 86. In this lap, Álex Palou took the lead of the race, where he would stay until the end of the race. Another caution was brought out in lap 90 for two laps as Sébastien Bourdais and Oliver Askew made contact in Turn 2, which resulted in the latter retiring from the race.

Palou finished first, clinching his third win of the season and therefore retaking the championship lead from O'Ward, who finished 14th. Alexander Rossi and Scott Dixon finished second and third respectively, rounding up an all-Honda podium.

=== Race classification ===
Pos	No.	Driver	Team	Engine	Laps	Time/Retired	Pit Stops	Grid	Laps Led	Pts.
1	10	(Spain) Álex Palou	Chip Ganassi Racing	Honda	110	2:07:04.1304	3	1	29	52
2	27	(United States) Alexander Rossi	Andretti Autosport	Honda	110	+1.2895	3	2		40
3	9	(New Zealand) Scott Dixon	Chip Ganassi Racing	Honda	110	+4.4406	3	3	4	36
4	60	(United Kingdom) Jack Harvey	Meyer Shank Racing	Honda	110	+8.2208	2	20	5	33
5	2	(United States) Josef Newgarden	Team Penske	Chevrolet	110	+8.9566	2	18		30
6	7	(Sweden) Felix Rosenqvist	Arrow McLaren SP	Chevrolet	110	+9.3231	3	4		28
7	8	(Sweden) Marcus Ericsson	Chip Ganassi Racing	Honda	110	+10.3425	3	10	1	27
8	26	(United States) Colton Herta	Andretti Autosport with Curb-Agajanian	Honda	110	+12.2628	3	6		24
9	3	(New Zealand) Scott McLaughlin R	Team Penske	Chevrolet	110	+13.9438	3	15	5	23
10	15	(United States) Graham Rahal	Rahal Letterman Lanigan Racing	Honda	110	+17.5449	2	5	36	23
11	18	(United Arab Emirates) Ed Jones	Dale Coyne Racing with Vasser-Sullivan	Honda	110	+18.1590	2	8	2	20
12	30	(Japan) Takuma Sato W	Rahal Letterman Lanigan Racing	Honda	110	+18.7513	2	26		18
13	12	(Australia) Will Power W	Team Penske	Chevrolet	110	+19.8312	7	14		17
14	5	(Mexico) Pato O'Ward	Arrow McLaren SP	Chevrolet	110	+20.8494	3	7	28	17
15	28	(United States) Ryan Hunter-Reay	Andretti Autosport	Honda	110	+25.5636	3	27		15
16	20	(United States) Conor Daly	Ed Carpenter Racing	Chevrolet	110	+27.3972	3	16		14
17	21	(Netherlands) Rinus VeeKay	Ed Carpenter Racing	Chevrolet	110	+31.9461	3	25		13
18	14	(France) Sébastien Bourdais	A. J. Foyt Enterprises	Chevrolet	110	+32.4259	3	12		12
19	59	(United Kingdom) Max Chilton	Carlin	Chevrolet	110	+33.2897	3	11		11
20	48	(United States) Jimmie Johnson R	Chip Ganassi Racing	Honda	110	+33.7026	4	22		10
21	22	(France) Simon Pagenaud	Team Penske	Chevrolet	109	+1 Lap	3	23		9
22	51	(France) Romain Grosjean R	Dale Coyne Racing with Rick Ware Racing	Honda	95	+15 Laps	4	21		8
23	06	(Brazil) Hélio Castroneves	Meyer Shank Racing	Honda	91	+19 Laps	4	17		7
24	45	(United States) Oliver Askew	Rahal Letterman Lanigan Racing	Honda	89	Contact	3	9		6
25	77	(United Kingdom) Callum Ilott R	Juncos Hollinger Racing	Chevrolet	77	Mechanical	3	19		5
26	4	(Canada) Dalton Kellett	A. J. Foyt Enterprises	Chevrolet	50	Mechanical	1	24		5
27	29	(Canada) James Hinchcliffe	Andretti Steinbrenner Autosport	Honda	1	Contact	0	13		5
Fastest lap: (France) Romain Grosjean R (Dale Coyne Racing with Rick Ware Racing) – 00:59.4381 (lap 83)

Cautions: 4 for 20 laps

Lead Changes: 12

== Championship standings after the race ==
Drivers' Championship standings

	Pos.	Driver	Points
1	1	(Spain) Álex Palou	477
1	2	(Mexico) Pato O'Ward	452
Unchanged	3	(United States) Josef Newgarden	443
Unchanged	4	(New Zealand) Scott Dixon	428
Unchanged	5	(Sweden) Marcus Ericsson	402

Engine manufacturer standings

	Pos.	Manufacturer	Points
Unchanged	1	Honda	1210
Unchanged	2	Chevrolet	1115

Note: Only the top five positions are included.
