= 2021 Firestone Grand Prix of Monterey =

15th round of the 2021 IndyCar Series

(United States) 2021 Firestone Grand Prix of Monterey
Race details
15th round of the 2021 IndyCar season
| ← Previous race | Next race → |
- Layout of the WeatherTech Raceway Laguna Seca
- Date: September 19, 2021
- Official name: Firestone Grand Prix of Monterey
- Location: WeatherTech Raceway Laguna Seca, Monterey, California
- Course: Permanent racing facility 2.238 mi / 3.602 km
- Distance: 95 laps 212.61 mi / 342.163 km
- Weather: Sunny

Pole position
- Driver: (United States) Colton Herta (Andretti Autosport with Curb Agajanian)
- Time: 01:10.7994

Fastest lap
- Driver: (United States) Josef Newgarden (Team Penske)
- Time: 01:13.0826 (on lap 10 of 95)

Podium
- First: (United States) Colton Herta (Andretti Autosport with Curb Agajanian)
- Second: (Spain) Álex Palou (Chip Ganassi Racing)
- Third: (France) Romain Grosjean (Dale Coyne Racing with Rick Ware Racing)

The 2021 Firestone Grand Prix of Monterey was an IndyCar motor race held on September 19, 2021, at the WeatherTech Raceway Laguna Seca. It was the 15th round of the 2021 IndyCar Series.

Andretti Autosport's Colton Herta won the race after leading 91 of 95 laps of the race, scoring his second win of the season and his second IndyCar win at Laguna Seca after he won the previous edition in 2019. Championship leader Álex Palou finished in second, ahead of rookie Romain Grosjean, who came third after gaining ten positions from his starting position, scoring his third IndyCar career podium.

== Background ==
The event, which was held on the weekend of September 17–19, 2021 at the WeatherTech Raceway Laguna Seca in Monterey, California, returned to the series after its absence in the 2020 season due to the COVID-19 pandemic. It was the penultimate race of the 2021 season, following the Grand Prix of Portland at the Portland International Raceway, which was held one week before this race, and preceding the season finale in the following week at the Streets of Long Beach.

Colton Herta was the previous race winner, having won the race in 2019 with Harding Steinbrenner Racing.

=== Championship standings before the race ===
After his win at the Grand Prix of Portland, Álex Palou retook the championship lead with a 25-point advantage from Pato O'Ward, who only finished 14th and subsequently dropped to second place in the standings. Third-placed Josef Newgarden closed the difference to O'Ward into a nine-point gap with a fifth-placed finish at Portland, while Scott Dixon and Marcus Ericsson improved their points tally in fourth and fifth respectively after strong finishes at Portland, with Dixon scoring a podium.

Honda remained in the lead of the manufacturer's standings over Chevrolet.

=== Entrants ===
| Key | Meaning |
|---|---|
| R | Rookie |
| W | Past winner |

| No. | Driver | Team | Engine |
|---|---|---|---|
| 2 | (United States) Josef Newgarden | Team Penske | Chevrolet |
| 3 | (New Zealand) Scott McLaughlin R | Team Penske | Chevrolet |
| 4 | (Canada) Dalton Kellett | A. J. Foyt Enterprises | Chevrolet |
| 5 | (Mexico) Patricio O'Ward | Arrow McLaren SP | Chevrolet |
| 06 | (Brazil) Hélio Castroneves | Meyer Shank Racing | Honda |
| 7 | (Sweden) Felix Rosenqvist | Arrow McLaren SP | Chevrolet |
| 8 | (Sweden) Marcus Ericsson | Chip Ganassi Racing | Honda |
| 9 | (New Zealand) Scott Dixon | Chip Ganassi Racing | Honda |
| 10 | (Spain) Álex Palou | Chip Ganassi Racing | Honda |
| 12 | (Australia) Will Power | Team Penske | Chevrolet |
| 14 | (France) Sébastien Bourdais | A. J. Foyt Enterprises | Chevrolet |
| 15 | (United States) Graham Rahal | Rahal Letterman Lanigan Racing | Honda |
| 18 | (United Arab Emirates) Ed Jones | Dale Coyne Racing with Vasser-Sullivan | Honda |
| 20 | (United States) Conor Daly | Ed Carpenter Racing | Chevrolet |
| 21 | (Netherlands) Rinus VeeKay | Ed Carpenter Racing | Chevrolet |
| 22 | (France) Simon Pagenaud | Team Penske | Chevrolet |
| 26 | (United States) Colton Herta W | Andretti Autosport with Curb Agajanian | Honda |
| 27 | (United States) Alexander Rossi | Andretti Autosport | Honda |
| 28 | (United States) Ryan Hunter-Reay | Andretti Autosport | Honda |
| 29 | (Canada) James Hinchcliffe | Andretti Steinbrenner Autosport | Honda |
| 30 | (Japan) Takuma Sato | Rahal Letterman Lanigan Racing | Honda |
| 45 | (United States) Oliver Askew | Rahal Letterman Lanigan Racing | Honda |
| 48 | (United States) Jimmie Johnson R | Chip Ganassi Racing | Honda |
| 51 | (France) Romain Grosjean R | Dale Coyne Racing with Rick Ware Racing | Honda |
| 59 | (United Kingdom) Max Chilton | Carlin | Chevrolet |
| 60 | (United Kingdom) Jack Harvey | Meyer Shank Racing | Honda |
| 77 | (United Kingdom) Callum Ilott R | Juncos Hollinger Racing | Chevrolet |

== Practice ==
=== Practice 1 ===
Practice 1 took place at 5:30 PM ET on September 17. The session saw numerous incidents happen, such as Colton Herta going off-track past the Corkscrew and Hélio Castroneves making contact with the tire barriers in Turn 2, though no major damage was caused. Josef Newgarden topped the first practice charts with a time of 01:11.7125, besting Herta in second and Álex Palou in third.

Top Practice Speeds
| Pos | No. | Driver | Team | Engine | Lap Time |
|---|---|---|---|---|---|
| 1 | 2 | (United States) Josef Newgarden | Team Penske | Chevrolet | 01:11.7125 |
| 2 | 26 | (United States) Colton Herta W | Andretti Autosport with Curb Agajanian | Honda | 01:11.7927 |
| 3 | 10 | (Spain) Álex Palou | Chip Ganassi Racing | Honda | 01:11.9750 |

=== Practice 2 ===
Practice 2 took place at 1:45 PM ET on September 18. The session was marred with two red flags, which cut up to 20 minutes of session time. Dalton Kellett lost control of and crashed his No. 4 car in Turn 4, triggering the first red flag. After the session restarted, Rinus VeeKay crashed at nearly the same spot as Kellett did, bringing out the second red flag of the session. Both drivers were unharmed. Rookie Scott McLaughlin topped the session with the best time of 01:10.8755, with Colton Herta and Álex Palou finishing second and third fastest.

Top Practice Speeds
| Pos | No. | Driver | Team | Engine | Lap Time |
|---|---|---|---|---|---|
| 1 | 3 | (New Zealand) Scott McLaughlin R | Team Penske | Chevrolet | 01:10.8755 |
| 2 | 26 | (United States) Colton Herta W | Andretti Autosport with Curb Agajanian | Honda | 01:11.0224 |
| 3 | 10 | (Spain) Álex Palou | Chip Ganassi Racing | Honda | 01:11.0312 |

== Qualifying ==
Qualifying took place at 5:05 PM ET on September 18. Colton Herta took pole position with a time of 01:10.7994, ahead of Andretti teammate Alexander Rossi and Penske driver Will Power, who finished second and third respectively.

=== Qualifying classification ===
| Pos | No. | Driver | Team | Engine | Time | | | | Final grid |
| Pos | No. | Driver | Team | Engine | Round 1 | | Round 2 | Round 3 | Final grid |
| Pos | No. | Driver | Team | Engine | Group 1 | Group 2 | Round 2 | Round 3 | Final grid |
|---|---|---|---|---|---|---|---|---|---|
| 1 | 26 | (United States) Colton Herta **W** | Andretti Autosport with Curb Agajanian | Honda | **01:10.9020** | N/A | **01:10.5847** | **01:10.7994** | 1 |
| 2 | 27 | (United States) Alexander Rossi | Andretti Autosport | Honda | N/A | 01:11.0691 | 01:10.9169 | 01:10.9951 | 2 |
| 3 | 12 | (Australia) Will Power | Team Penske | Chevrolet | N/A | 01:11.2836 | 01:10.8333 | 01:11.1317^{1} | 3 |
| 4 | 10 | (Spain) Álex Palou | Chip Ganassi Racing | Honda | N/A | 01:11.4397 | 01:10.8351 | 01:11.3317 | 4 |
| 5 | 45 | (United States) Oliver Askew | Rahal Letterman Lanigan Racing | Honda | N/A | **01:11.0155** | 01:10.9117 | 01:11.8937 | 5 |
| 6 | 5 | (Mexico) Pato O'Ward | Arrow McLaren SP | Chevrolet | 01:11.2992 | N/A | 01:11.0220 | 01:24.2715^{2} | 6 |
| 7 | 8 | (Sweden) Marcus Ericsson | Chip Ganassi Racing | Honda | 01:11.3179 | N/A | 01:11.2581 | N/A | 7 |
| 8 | 9 | (New Zealand) Scott Dixon | Chip Ganassi Racing | Honda | 01:11.5276 | N/A | 01:11.2768 | N/A | 8 |
| 9 | 22 | (France) Simon Pagenaud | Team Penske | Chevrolet | 01:11.3775 | N/A | 01:11.3067 | N/A | 9 |
| 10 | 59 | (United Kingdom) Max Chilton | Carlin | Chevrolet | N/A | 01:11.1852 | 01:11.3088 | N/A | 10 |
| 11 | 29 | (Canada) James Hinchcliffe | Andretti Steinbrenner Autosport | Honda | N/A | 01:11.3542 | 01:11.4567 | N/A | 11 |
| 12 | 15 | (United States) Graham Rahal | Rahal Letterman Lanigan Racing | Honda | 01:10.9915 | N/A | 01:12.5932 | N/A | 12 |
| 13 | 51 | (France) Romain Grosjean **R** | Dale Coyne Racing with Rick Ware Racing | Honda | 01:11.5303 | N/A | N/A | N/A | 13 |
| 14 | 18 | (United Arab Emirates) Ed Jones | Dale Coyne Racing with Vasser-Sullivan | Honda | N/A | 01:11.4692 | N/A | N/A | 14 |
| 15 | 7 | (Sweden) Felix Rosenqvist | Arrow McLaren SP | Chevrolet | 01:11.5446 | N/A | N/A | N/A | 15 |
| 16 | 3 | (New Zealand) Scott McLaughlin **R** | Chip Ganassi Racing | Honda | N/A | 01:11.5767 | N/A | N/A | 16 |
| 17 | 2 | (United States) Josef Newgarden | Team Penske | Chevrolet | 01:11.5503 | N/A | N/A | N/A | 17 |
| 18 | 20 | (United States) Conor Daly | Ed Carpenter Racing | Chevrolet | N/A | 01:11.5921 | N/A | N/A | 18 |
| 19 | 28 | (United States) Ryan Hunter-Reay | Andretti Autosport | Honda | 01:11.6721 | N/A | N/A | N/A | 19 |
| 20 | 60 | (United Kingdom) Jack Harvey | Meyer Shank Racing | Honda | N/A | 01:11.6689 | N/A | N/A | 20 |
| 21 | 14 | (France) Sébastien Bourdais | A. J. Foyt Enterprises | Chevrolet | 01:11.9776 | N/A | N/A | N/A | 21 |
| 22 | 06 | (Brazil) Hélio Castroneves | Meyer Shank Racing | Honda | N/A | 01:11.8071 | N/A | N/A | 22 |
| 23 | 30 | (Japan) Takuma Sato | Rahal Letterman Lanigan Racing | Honda | 01:12.1443 | N/A | N/A | N/A | 22 |
| 24 | 21 | (Netherlands) Rinus VeeKay | Ed Carpenter Racing | Chevrolet | N/A | 01:12.2843 | N/A | N/A | 24 |
| 25 | 48 | (United States) Jimmie Johnson **R** | Chip Ganassi Racing | Honda | 01:12.2865 | N/A | N/A | N/A | 25 |
| 26 | 77 | (United Kingdom) Callum Ilott **R** | Juncos Hollinger Racing | Chevrolet | N/A | 01:12.3558 | N/A | N/A | 26 |
| 27 | 4 | (Canada) Dalton Kellett | A. J. Foyt Enterprises | Chevrolet | N/A | 01:12.6055 | N/A | N/A | 27 |

Notes

- **Bold text** indicates fastest time set in session.
- **^1** - Will Power was initially second fastest, but had his lap invalidated, as officials judged him to have failed to slow down during a local yellow caused by Pato O'Ward's spin at the Corkscrew.
- **^2** - Pato O'Ward had his best time invalidated due to a penalty for his spin at the Corkscrew.

== Final Practice ==
Warmup took place at 12:00 PM ET on September 19. Rookie Callum Ilott spun off into the tire barriers in Turn 6 during the session, causing a red flag. Ilott was uninjured. Alexander Rossi went fastest with a time of 01:12.8632, with Colton Herta finishing second and Takuma Sato finishing third.

Top Warmup Speeds
| Pos | No. | Driver | Team | Engine | Lap Time |
|---|---|---|---|---|---|
| 1 | 27 | (United States) Alexander Rossi | Andretti Autosport | Honda | 01:12.8632 |
| 2 | 26 | (United States) Colton Herta W | Andretti Autosport with Curb Agajanian | Honda | 01:12.9651 |
| 3 | 30 | (Japan) Takuma Sato | Rahal Letterman Lanigan Racing | Honda | 01:13.3539 |

== Race ==
The race started at 3:00 PM ET on September 19. On lap 2, race leader Colton Herta and Alexander Rossi made contact in Turn 2, as Rossi attempted to capitalize on a Herta mistake. However, while Herta managed to continue without problems, Rossi spun into the gravel and stalled, causing a caution as his car was restarted – he would later finish 25th, two laps behind. On lap 10, Will Power, who started third, suddenly had engine problems that prompted him to pit to resolve the issue – he finished the race two laps behind in 26th. Takuma Sato spun at the Corkscrew mid-race. As Sato's car stalled, it rolled backwards towards Scott Dixon, who attempted an evasive maneuver by driving off-track, but to no avail, as he suffered damage to his right sidepod and undertray. Dixon was forced to drive on with the damage and would later finish 13th.

Herta led most of the race, being in the lead for 91 of 95 laps. Romain Grosjean led the four remaining lead laps, as he made a surge to the front from thirteenth. Grosjean made several passes at the iconic Corkscrew corner, most notably his pass against fellow rookie Jimmie Johnson towards the end of the race, as Grosjean was quickly gaining to the lead pack after fitting on a fresh set of tires and as Johnson was defending to protect his teammate, Álex Palou, who was running in second place. The two were able to continue racing, but Grosjean's pace would dwindle after the incident.

Colton Herta won the race, clinching consecutive wins at the Monterey Grand Prix as he won the 2019 edition, repeating a feat achieved by his father, Bryan Herta, in 1998 and 1999. Championship leader Álex Palou finished second, extending his points lead over Pato O'Ward, who finished fifth, to 35 points. Rookie Romain Grosjean took his third IndyCar podium as he finished third, narrowing the gap in the battle for Rookie of the Year to fellow rookie Scott McLaughlin into 20 points. 2020 champion Scott Dixon saw his title hopes end, as the gap between him and Palou grew to 72 points, ruling out consecutive championship wins for Dixon.

=== Race classification ===
| Pos | No. | Driver | Team | Engine | Laps | Time/Retired | Pit Stops | Grid | Laps Led | Pts. |
|---|---|---|---|---|---|---|---|---|---|---|
| 1 | 26 | (United States) Colton Herta W | Andretti Autosport with Curb Agajanian | Honda | 95 | 2:02:31.5444 | 3 | 1 | 91 | 54 |
| 2 | 10 | (Spain) Álex Palou | Chip Ganassi Racing | Honda | 95 | +1.9747 | 3 | 4 | | 40 |
| 3 | 51 | (France) Romain Grosjean R | Dale Coyne Racing with Rick Ware Racing | Honda | 95 | +3.7087 | 3 | 13 | 4 | 36 |
| 4 | 15 | (United States) Graham Rahal | Rahal Letterman Lanigan Racing | Honda | 95 | +13.8616 | 3 | 12 | | 32 |
| 5 | 5 | (Mexico) Pato O'Ward | Arrow McLaren SP | Chevrolet | 95 | +24.6972 | 3 | 6 | | 30 |
| 6 | 8 | (Sweden) Marcus Ericsson | Chip Ganassi Racing | Honda | 95 | +28.5032 | 3 | 7 | | 28 |
| 7 | 2 | (United States) Josef Newgarden | Team Penske | Chevrolet | 95 | +29.7267 | 4 | 17 | | 26 |
| 8 | 22 | (France) Simon Pagenaud | Team Penske | Chevrolet | 95 | +30.4215 | 3 | 9 | | 24 |
| 9 | 45 | (United States) Oliver Askew | Rahal Letterman Lanigan Racing | Honda | 95 | +32.4675 | 3 | 5 | | 22 |
| 10 | 18 | (United Arab Emirates) Ed Jones | Dale Coyne Racing with Vasser-Sullivan | Honda | 95 | +47.9944 | 3 | 14 | | 20 |
| 11 | 28 | (United States) Ryan Hunter-Reay | Andretti Autosport | Honda | 95 | +1:07.1843 | 3 | 19 | 0 | 19 |
| 12 | 3 | (New Zealand) Scott McLaughlin R | Team Penske | Chevrolet | 95 | +1:13.4940 | 3 | 16 | | 18 |
| 13 | 9 | (New Zealand) Scott Dixon | Chip Ganassi Racing | Honda | 95 | +1:16.3595 | 3 | 8 | | 17 |
| 14 | 14 | (France) Sébastien Bourdais | A. J. Foyt Enterprises | Chevrolet | 94 | +1 Lap | 3 | 21 | | 16 |
| 15 | 60 | (United Kingdom) Jack Harvey | Meyer Shank Racing | Honda | 94 | +1 Lap | 3 | 20 | | 15 |
| 16 | 20 | (United States) Conor Daly | Ed Carpenter Racing | Chevrolet | 94 | +1 Lap | 3 | 18 | | 14 |
| 17 | 48 | (United States) Jimmie Johnson R | Chip Ganassi Racing | Honda | 94 | +1 Lap | 4 | 25 | | 13 |
| 18 | 21 | (Netherlands) Rinus VeeKay | Ed Carpenter Racing | Chevrolet | 94 | +1 Lap | 4 | 24 | | 12 |
| 19 | 7 | (Sweden) Felix Rosenqvist | Arrow McLaren SP | Chevrolet | 94 | +1 Lap | 4 | 15 | | 11 |
| 20 | 29 | (Canada) James Hinchcliffe | Andretti Steinbrenner Autosport | Honda | 94 | +1 Lap | 4 | 11 | | 10 |
| 21 | 59 | (United Kingdom) Max Chilton | Carlin | Chevrolet | 94 | +1 Lap | 4 | 10 | | 9 |
| 22 | 77 | (United Kingdom) Callum Ilott R | Juncos Hollinger Racing | Chevrolet | 94 | +1 Lap | 5 | 26 | | 8 |
| 23 | 4 | (Canada) Dalton Kellett | A. J. Foyt Enterprises | Chevrolet | 94 | +1 Lap | 3 | 27 | | 7 |
| 24 | 06 | (Brazil) Hélio Castroneves | Meyer Shank Racing | Honda | 94 | +1 Lap | 4 | 22 | | 6 |
| 25 | 27 | (United States) Alexander Rossi | Andretti Autosport | Honda | 93 | +2 Laps | 3 | 2 | | 5 |
| 26 | 12 | (Australia) Will Power | Team Penske | Chevrolet | 93 | +2 Laps | 3 | 3 | | 5 |
| 27 | 30 | (Japan) Takuma Sato | Rahal Letterman Lanigan Racing | Honda | 83 | Mechanical | 4 | 23 | | 5 |
Fastest lap: (United States) Josef Newgarden (Team Penske) – 01:13.0826 (lap 10)

== Championship standings after the race ==
Honda clinched their fourth consecutive Manufacturer's Cup at Laguna Seca, as the top five finishers featured four Honda-powered cars. The drivers' championship was decided at the final race of the season, where Álex Palou needed to finish 12th or better to win the championship, with Pato O'Ward and Josef Newgarden mathematically still in contention.

Drivers' Championship standings

| | Pos. | Driver | Points |
|---|---|---|---|
| Unchanged | 1 | (Spain) Álex Palou | 517 |
| Unchanged | 2 | (Mexico) Pato O'Ward | 482 |
| Unchanged | 3 | (United States) Josef Newgarden | 469 |
| Unchanged | 4 | (New Zealand) Scott Dixon | 445 |
| Unchanged | 5 | (Sweden) Marcus Ericsson | 430 |

Engine manufacturer standings

| | Pos. | Manufacturer | Points |
|---|---|---|---|
| Unchanged | 1 | **Honda** | 1306 |
| Unchanged | 2 | Chevrolet | 1175 |

- Note: Only the top five positions are included.
- **Bold text** indicates Championship Winners.
