= 2021 Bommarito Automotive Group 500 =

13th round of the 2021 IndyCar Series

(United States) 2021 Bommarito Automotive Group 500
Race details
13th round of the 2021 IndyCar season
← Previous race	Next race →
- Layout of the World Wide Technology Raceway
- Date: August 21, 2021
- Official name: Bommarito Automotive Group 500
- Location: World Wide Technology Raceway, Madison, Illinois
- Course: Permanent racing facility 1.25 mi / 2.01 km
- Distance: 260 laps 325 mi / 522.6 km

Pole position
- Driver: (Australia) (Australia) Will Power (Team Penske)
- Time: 00:49.8289 (total time from 2 laps)

Fastest lap
- Driver: (Japan) (Japan) Takuma Sato (Rahal Letterman Lanigan Racing)
- Time: 00:25.7998 (on lap 195 of 260)

Podium
- First: (United States) (United States) Josef Newgarden (Team Penske)
- Second: (Mexico) (Mexico) Pato O'Ward (Arrow McLaren SP)
- Third: (Australia) (Australia) Will Power (Team Penske)

The 2021 Bommarito Automotive Group 500 was an IndyCar motor race held on August 21, 2021, at the World Wide Technology Raceway. It was the 13th round of the 2021 IndyCar Series.

Josef Newgarden of Team Penske won his second race of the season, ahead of Arrow McLaren SP driver Pato O'Ward in second and polesitter Will Power in third.

== Background ==
INDYCAR used only the Saturday of the two-day event, with NASCAR Truck Series racing on Friday and INDYCAR on Saturday, starting at noon and ending on the night of August 21, 2021. It was held one week after the Big Machine Spiked Coolers Grand Prix at Indianapolis and three weeks before the Grand Prix of Portland. It was the last oval race of the 2021 season.

Josef Newgarden was the previous race winner, having won the second race in the 2020 double-header event.

=== Championship standings before the race ===
Álex Palou remained top of the standings with a 21-point gap over Pato O'Ward, despite his dismal 27th-place finish at the Big Machine Spiked Coolers Grand Prix. O'Ward, who finished fifth in that race, moved up to second, as Scott Dixon was demoted to third, sitting above Josef Newgarden in fourth and Marcus Ericsson in fifth.

=== Entrants ===
24 drivers entered the race. IndyCar rookie Jimmie Johnson was replaced by Tony Kanaan, who had signed with the team to race in the season's oval races in place of Johnson. Ed Carpenter returned to pilot the No. 20 in a similar deal, replacing Conor Daly, who went to drive the No. 59 Carlin.

Rookie Romain Grosjean participated in his first oval race, after initially only signing with Dale Coyne Racing to race in road and street courses.

Key	Meaning
R	Rookie
W	Past winner

No.	Driver	Team	Engine
2	(United States) Josef Newgarden W	Team Penske	Chevrolet
3	(New Zealand) Scott McLaughlin R	Team Penske	Chevrolet
4	(Canada) Dalton Kellett	A. J. Foyt Enterprises	Chevrolet
5	(Mexico) Patricio O'Ward	Arrow McLaren SP	Chevrolet
7	(Sweden) Felix Rosenqvist	Arrow McLaren SP	Chevrolet
8	(Sweden) Marcus Ericsson	Chip Ganassi Racing	Honda
9	(New Zealand) Scott Dixon W	Chip Ganassi Racing	Honda
10	(Spain) Álex Palou	Chip Ganassi Racing	Honda
12	(Australia) Will Power W	Team Penske	Chevrolet
14	(France) Sébastien Bourdais	A. J. Foyt Enterprises	Chevrolet
15	(United States) Graham Rahal	Rahal Letterman Lanigan Racing	Honda
18	(United Arab Emirates) Ed Jones	Dale Coyne Racing with Vasser-Sullivan	Honda
20	(United States) Ed Carpenter	Ed Carpenter Racing	Chevrolet
21	(Netherlands) Rinus VeeKay	Ed Carpenter Racing	Chevrolet
22	(France) Simon Pagenaud	Team Penske	Chevrolet
26	(United States) Colton Herta	Andretti Autosport with Curb-Agajanian	Honda
27	(United States) Alexander Rossi	Andretti Autosport	Honda
28	(United States) Ryan Hunter-Reay	Andretti Autosport	Honda
29	(Canada) James Hinchcliffe	Andretti Steinbrenner Autosport	Honda
30	(Japan) Takuma Sato W	Rahal Letterman Lanigan Racing	Honda
48	(Brazil) Tony Kanaan	Chip Ganassi Racing	Honda
51	(France) Romain Grosjean R	Dale Coyne Racing with Rick Ware Racing	Honda
59	(United States) Conor Daly	Carlin	Chevrolet
60	(United Kingdom) Jack Harvey	Meyer Shank Racing	Honda

== Practice ==
Practice took place at 1:15 PM ET and ended with Josef Newgarden topping the charts, with a lap time of 00:25.1715.

Top Practice Speeds
Pos	No.	Driver	Team	Engine	Lap Time
1	2	(United States) Josef Newgarden	Team Penske	Chevrolet	00:25.1715
2	3	(New Zealand) Scott McLaughlin R	Team Penske	Chevrolet	00:25.3280
3	28	(United States) Ryan Hunter-Reay	Andretti Autosport	Honda	00:25.3462

== Qualifying ==
Qualifying was held at 5:00 PM ET. Each driver set two laps in the session. Positions were then determined based on the total time of those two laps.

Will Power won pole position, with a total time of 00:49.8289.

=== Qualifying classification ===
Pos	No.	Driver	Team	Engine	Lap 1	Lap 2	Total Time	Final grid
1	12	(Australia) Will Power W	Team Penske	Chevrolet	00:24.9781	00:24.8508	00:49.8289	1
2	26	(United States) Colton Herta	Andretti Autosport with Curb-Agajanian	Honda	00:24.9231	00:24.9306	00:49.8537	2
3	2	(United States) Josef Newgarden W	Team Penske	Chevrolet	00:25.0090	00:24.8499	00:49.8589	3
4	22	(France) Simon Pagenaud	Team Penske	Chevrolet	00:24.9417	00:24.9564	00:49.8981	4
5	5	(Mexico) Pato O'Ward	Arrow McLaren SP	Chevrolet	00:25.0855	00:24.9441	00:50.0296	5
6	8	(Sweden) Marcus Ericsson	Chip Ganassi Racing	Honda	00:24.9860	00:25.0589	00:50.0449	6
7	27	(United States) Alexander Rossi	Andretti Autosport	Honda	00:25.0374	00:25.0771	00:50.1145	7
8	9	(New Zealand) Scott Dixon W	Chip Ganassi Racing	Honda	00:25.1274	00:25.0153	00:50.1427	8
9	15	(United States) Graham Rahal	Rahal Letterman Lanigan Racing	Honda	00:25.2118	00:25.0674	00:50.2792	9
10	7	(Sweden) Felix Rosenqvist	Arrow McLaren SP	Chevrolet	00:25.1950	00:25.1046	00:50.2996	10
11	3	(New Zealand) Scott McLaughlin R	Team Penske	Chevrolet	00:25.2894	00:25.0142	00:50.3036	11
12	10	(Spain) Álex Palou	Chip Ganassi Racing	Honda	00:25.1824	00:25.2156	00:50.3980	21^{1}
13	18	(United Arab Emirates) Ed Jones	Dale Coyne Racing with Vasser-Sullivan	Honda	00:25.2896	00:25.1644	00:50.4540	12
14	28	(United States) Ryan Hunter-Reay	Andretti Autosport	Honda	00:25.2011	00:25.2594	00:50.4605	13
15	51	(France) Romain Grosjean R	Dale Coyne Racing with Rick Ware Racing	Honda	00:25.1837	00:25.3157	00:50.4994	14
16	60	(United Kingdom) Jack Harvey	Meyer Shank Racing	Honda	00:25.2600	00:25.2763	00:50.5363	15
17	30	(Japan) Takuma Sato W	Rahal Letterman Lanigan Racing	Honda	00:25.2740	00:25.3232	00:50.5972	16
18	48	(Brazil) Tony Kanaan	Chip Ganassi Racing	Honda	00:25.3680	00:25.4282	00:50.7962	17
19	14	(France) Sébastien Bourdais	A. J. Foyt Enterprises	Chevrolet	00:25.4218	00:25.4606	00:50.8824	18
20	29	(Canada) James Hinchcliffe	Andretti Steinbrenner Autosport	Honda	00:25.4631	00:25.4338	00:50.8969	19
21	59	(United States) Conor Daly	Carlin	Chevrolet	00:25.4926	00:25.4854	00:50.9780	20
22	20	(United States) Ed Carpenter	Ed Carpenter Racing	Chevrolet	00:25.5659	00:25.4951	00:51.0610	22
23	21	(Netherlands) Rinus VeeKay	Ed Carpenter Racing	Chevrolet	00:25.5544	00:25.5189	00:51.0733	23
24	4	(Canada) Dalton Kellett	A. J. Foyt Enterprises	Chevrolet	00:25.8140	00:25.6724	00:51.4864	24

Notes

- ^1 – Álex Palou received a nine-place grid penalty due to an unapproved engine change. He would start the race 21st.

== Race ==
The race started at 8:00 PM ET. The start, led by Team Penske's Will Power, went underway with no incidents. On lap 2, Power was overtaken by Colton Herta, who assumed the lead of the race. The following lap saw a caution brought out, as Graham Rahal and Ed Jones made contact in Turn 2, sending both drivers into the wall. Both drivers would retire from the race, classifying second last and last respectively. The caution lasted 12 laps. As the race restarted after the caution on lap 15, teammates Josef Newgarden and Simon Pagenaud made contact, damaging the right side of Pagenaud's front wing, which would detach and land on the track, causing another caution that lasted four laps. A light malfunction caused the third caution of the day to be triggered on lap 21, lasting four laps.

On lap 54, Ed Carpenter spun and crashed out of the race in Turn 4, causing the fourth caution of the race, which would last until lap 63. Sébastien Bourdais took the lead of the race, as the front three pitted. Herta lost the effective lead of the race to Newgarden, who exited the pit lane first. Another caution would be declared on lap 65, as Rinus VeeKay crashed into Álex Palou in Turn 1, who then hit the rear of teammate Scott Dixon's car, sending the three into the wall. The race restarted with Newgarden in the lead, after Bourdais made his pit stop.

On lap 139, Herta overtook Newgarden for the lead, but lost it as he pitted on lap 185. Herta would retire from the race as his driveshaft broke during pit exit. On lap 200, Alexander Rossi hit the wall in Turn 2 during his out lap after his final pit stop, ending his race and causing the sixth and final caution of the race, which lasted nine laps. Felix Rosenqvist had a mechanical failure on lap 211, which prompted him to retire from the race.

Josef Newgarden won the race, half a second over Arrow McLaren SP's Pato O'Ward in second. Polesitter Will Power finished third.

=== Race classification ===
Pos	No.	Driver	Team	Engine	Laps	Time/Retired	Pit Stops	Grid	Laps Led	Pts.
1	2	(United States) Josef Newgarden W	Team Penske	Chevrolet	260	2:24:10.9404	3	3	138	53
2	5	(Mexico) Pato O'Ward	Arrow McLaren SP	Chevrolet	260	+0.5397	3	5	1	41
3	12	(Australia) Will Power W	Team Penske	Chevrolet	260	+5.8660	3	1	1	37
4	3	(New Zealand) Scott McLaughlin R	Team Penske	Chevrolet	260	+6.6620	3	11		32
5	14	(France) Sébastien Bourdais	A. J. Foyt Enterprises	Chevrolet	260	+8.9566	2	18	18	31
6	30	(Japan) Takuma Sato W	Rahal Letterman Lanigan Racing	Honda	260	+8.2618	4	16		28
7	28	(United States) Ryan Hunter-Reay	Andretti Autosport	Honda	260	+14.0259	4	13		26
8	22	(France) Simon Pagenaud	Team Penske	Chevrolet	260	+15.5421	6	4	1	25
9	8	(Sweden) Marcus Ericsson	Chip Ganassi Racing	Honda	260	+18.7676	3	6		22
10	60	(United Kingdom) Jack Harvey	Meyer Shank Racing	Honda	260	+20.1207	3	15		20
11	59	(United States) Conor Daly	Carlin	Chevrolet	260	+22.1036	4	20		19
12	4	(Canada) Dalton Kellett	A. J. Foyt Enterprises	Chevrolet	260	+24.5581	5	24		18
13	48	(Brazil) Tony Kanaan	Chip Ganassi Racing	Honda	260	+26.8367	4	17		17
14	51	(France) Romain Grosjean R	Dale Coyne Racing with Rick Ware Racing	Honda	259	+1 Lap	4	14		16
15	29	(Canada) James Hinchcliffe	Andretti Steinbrenner Autosport	Honda	243	+17 Laps	7	19		15
16	7	(Sweden) Felix Rosenqvist	Arrow McLaren SP	Chevrolet	211	Mechanical	4	10		14
17	27	(United States) Alexander Rossi	Andretti Autosport	Honda	200	Contact	3	7		13
18	26	(United States) Colton Herta	Andretti Autosport with Curb-Agajanian	Honda	185	Mechanical	3	2	101	13
19	9	(New Zealand) Scott Dixon W	Chip Ganassi Racing	Honda	100	Contact	2	8		11
20	10	(Spain) Álex Palou	Chip Ganassi Racing	Honda	64	Contact	1	21		10
21	21	(Netherlands) Rinus VeeKay	Ed Carpenter Racing	Chevrolet	64	Contact	1	23		9
22	20	(United States) Ed Carpenter	Ed Carpenter Racing	Chevrolet	54	Contact	2	22		8
23	15	(United States) Graham Rahal	Rahal Letterman Lanigan Racing	Honda	4	Contact	1	9		7
24	18	(United Arab Emirates) Ed Jones	Dale Coyne Racing with Vasser-Sullivan	Honda	2	Contact	0	12		6
Fastest lap: (Japan) Takuma Sato (Rahal Letterman Lanigan Racing) – 00:25.7998 (lap 195)

== Championship standings after the race ==
Pato O'Ward took the championship lead after his second-place finish, with Álex Palou dropping down to second, above race winner Josef Newgarden, who rose to third over Scott Dixon, who was demoted to fourth.

Drivers' Championship standings

	Pos.	Driver	Points
1	1	(Mexico) Pato O'Ward	435
1	2	(Spain) Álex Palou	425
1	3	(United States) Josef Newgarden	413
1	4	(New Zealand) Scott Dixon	392
Unchanged	5	(Sweden) Marcus Ericsson	375

Engine manufacturer standings

	Pos.	Manufacturer	Points
Unchanged	1	Honda	1092
Unchanged	2	Chevrolet	1057

- Note: Only the top five positions are included.
