= 2021 Acura Grand Prix of Long Beach =

16th and final race of the 2021 IndyCar Series

(United States) 2021 Acura Grand Prix of Long Beach
Race details
16th round of the 2021 IndyCar season
← Previous race
- Layout of the Streets of Long Beach
- Date: September 26, 2021
- Official name: Acura Grand Prix of Long Beach
- Location: Streets of Long Beach, Long Beach, California
- Course: Temporary road course 1.968 mi / 3.167 km
- Distance: 85 laps 167.28 mi / 269.211 km
- Weather: Overcast, temperatures up to 68.0 °F (20.0 °C); wind speeds up to 7.0 mph (11.3 km/h)

Pole position
- Driver: (United States) Josef Newgarden (Team Penske)
- Time: 01:08.2241

Fastest lap
- Driver: (Mexico) Pato O'Ward (Arrow McLaren SP)
- Time: 01:09.1407 (on lap 22 of 85)

Podium
- First: (United States) Colton Herta (Andretti Autosport with Curb Agajanian)
- Second: (United States) Josef Newgarden (Team Penske)
- Third: (New Zealand) Scott Dixon (Chip Ganassi Racing)

Chronology
Previous	Next
2019	2022

The 2021 Acura Grand Prix of Long Beach was an IndyCar motor race held on September 26, 2021, at the Streets of Long Beach. It was the 16th and final round of the 2021 IndyCar Series and determined the 2021 IndyCar drivers' champion.

Andretti Autosport's Colton Herta emerged as victor after 85 laps, claiming his third win of the season. Josef Newgarden of Team Penske finished second, sealing second place over Pato O'Ward in the drivers' championship. Chip Ganassi Racing driver Scott Dixon rounded out the podium places with a third-place finish, finishing ahead of teammate Álex Palou in fourth, who won the drivers' championship title with the result.

This was the final race to feature Max Chilton, Charlie Kimball, Ed Jones and Carlin Motorsport. This was also the final race for six-time race winner James Hinchcliffe. He is now a color commentator for NBC Sports. Lastly, this was the final career IndyCar start for American open wheel racing legend Sébastien Bourdais.

== Background ==
The race was originally due to take place on 18 April 2021 as the third round of the championship, after the 2020 race was cancelled due to a stay-at-home order caused by the COVID-19 pandemic in California. On 17 December 2020, the race was rescheduled to 26 September 2021. It was held at the Streets of Long Beach in Long Beach, California, one week after the Firestone Grand Prix of Monterey at Laguna Seca. The event was the final race of the 2021 IndyCar Series and marked the race's 46th annual running and return to the series, after its absence in the 2020 season due to the COVID-19 pandemic.

Alexander Rossi was the previous race winner, having won the 2019 event.

=== Championship standings before the race ===
Championship leader Álex Palou extended his lead over Pato O'Ward to a 35-point advantage, thanks to a second-place finish in the Firestone Grand Prix of Monterey. O'Ward remained second in the drivers' standings, after finishing fifth at the previous race. Josef Newgarden sat third, after finishing seventh at Laguna Seca. Fourth-placed Scott Dixon saw his gap to points leader Palou widen to 72 points, effectively ending his hopes of defending his 2020 title.

The trio of Palou, O'Ward, and Newgarden came into the race with a possibility of winning the championship.

Palou would win if:

- He finished 12th or better.
- He finished 13th or better and led a lap.

O'Ward would win if:

- He won the race and Palou finished 25th or lower.
- He won the race and led most laps, with Palou not leading a lap and finishing 13th or lower.
- He came second, led a lap, and Palou finished 25th or lower.

Newgarden would win the championship if he won and led the most laps in the race, with Palou finishing 25th or lower and with O'Ward finishing second or lower and with Palou and O'Ward not leading a lap of the race.

Honda had won their fourth consecutive Manufacturer's Cup in the Firestone Grand Prix of Monterey over Chevrolet.

=== Entrants ===
28 drivers entered the race, with Charlie Kimball returning to run the No. 11 car for A. J. Foyt Enterprises, after his appearances at the GMR Grand Prix and the Indianapolis 500.

Key	Meaning
R	Rookie
W	Past winner

No.	Driver	Team	Engine
2	(United States) Josef Newgarden	Team Penske	Chevrolet
3	(New Zealand) Scott McLaughlin R	Team Penske	Chevrolet
4	(Canada) Dalton Kellett	A. J. Foyt Enterprises	Chevrolet
5	(Mexico) Patricio O'Ward	Arrow McLaren SP	Chevrolet
06	(Brazil) Hélio Castroneves	Meyer Shank Racing	Honda
7	(Sweden) Felix Rosenqvist	Arrow McLaren SP	Chevrolet
8	(Sweden) Marcus Ericsson	Chip Ganassi Racing	Honda
9	(New Zealand) Scott Dixon W	Chip Ganassi Racing	Honda
10	(Spain) Álex Palou	Chip Ganassi Racing	Honda
11	(United States) Charlie Kimball	A. J. Foyt Enterprises	Chevrolet
12	(Australia) Will Power W	Team Penske	Chevrolet
14	(France) Sébastien Bourdais	A. J. Foyt Enterprises	Chevrolet
15	(United States) Graham Rahal	Rahal Letterman Lanigan Racing	Honda
18	(United Arab Emirates) Ed Jones	Dale Coyne Racing with Vasser-Sullivan	Honda
20	(United States) Conor Daly	Ed Carpenter Racing	Chevrolet
21	(Netherlands) Rinus VeeKay	Ed Carpenter Racing	Chevrolet
22	(France) Simon Pagenaud W	Team Penske	Chevrolet
26	(United States) Colton Herta	Andretti Autosport with Curb Agajanian	Honda
27	(United States) Alexander Rossi W	Andretti Autosport	Honda
28	(United States) Ryan Hunter-Reay W	Andretti Autosport	Honda
29	(Canada) James Hinchcliffe W	Andretti Steinbrenner Autosport	Honda
30	(Japan) Takuma Sato W	Rahal Letterman Lanigan Racing	Honda
45	(United States) Oliver Askew	Rahal Letterman Lanigan Racing	Honda
48	(United States) Jimmie Johnson R	Chip Ganassi Racing	Honda
51	(France) Romain Grosjean R	Dale Coyne Racing with Rick Ware Racing	Honda
59	(United Kingdom) Max Chilton	Carlin	Chevrolet
60	(United Kingdom) Jack Harvey	Meyer Shank Racing	Honda
77	(United Kingdom) Callum Ilott R	Juncos Hollinger Racing	Chevrolet

== Practice ==
=== Practice 1 ===
Practice 1 took place at 6:00 PM ET on September 24, 2021. Championship contenders Pato O'Ward and Josef Newgarden struggled in practice, as Newgarden spun early in the session (with no damage sustained) and classified ninth, while O'Ward only managed to place 16th. Colton Herta finished fastest with a time of 01:09.2680. 2016 race winner Simon Pagenaud went second fastest, ahead of championship leader Álex Palou in third.

Top Practice Speeds
Pos	No.	Driver	Team	Engine	Lap Time
1	26	(United States) Colton Herta	Andretti Autosport with Curb Agajanian	Honda	01:09.2680
2	22	(France) Simon Pagenaud W	Team Penske	Chevrolet	01:09.4334
3	10	(Spain) Álex Palou	Chip Ganassi Racing	Honda	01:09.4554

=== Practice 2 ===
Practice 2 took place at 12:00 PM ET on September 25, 2021. Colton Herta, who topped the first practice charts, went fastest again with a time of 01:07.9783, despite hitting the wall early in the session. Will Power placed second, ahead of James Hinchcliffe, who won the race in 2017, in third.

Top Practice Speeds
Pos	No.	Driver	Team	Engine	Lap Time
1	26	(United States) Colton Herta	Andretti Autosport with Curb Agajanian	Honda	01:07.9783
2	12	(Australia) Will Power W	Team Penske	Chevrolet	01:08.1277
3	29	(Canada) James Hinchcliffe W	Andretti Steinbrenner Autosport	Honda	01:08.2250

== Qualifying ==
Qualifying took place at 3:00 PM ET on September 25, 2021.

The first group in Round 1 saw their session end under a red flag, as Jack Harvey crashed into the tire barriers in Turn 8, in his final race for Meyer Shank Racing. Will Power proceeded to make contact with the stationary Harvey, critically damaging his rear wing and right rear wheels. Despite this, Power advanced to the next round. In the second group, Colton Herta, who was fastest in both pre-qualifying practice sessions, failed to advance to the next round, as he initially attempted to set a time with the primary Firestone tires, which led him to not have enough time to set a top 6 lap with the alternate tires.

At the end of the Firestone Fast 12, Will Power stopped in Turn 10 after hitting the wall, triggering a local yellow flag. This forced championship contenders Álex Palou and Pato O'Ward, along with other drivers, to slow down in the area and abort their fast lap, eliminating them from the contest for pole. O'Ward and Palou would start eighth and tenth in the race respectively. Ed Jones, who had initially set a time that would have put him in the Firestone Fast 6, had his lap deleted, as he was judged to have failed to slow down during the local yellow.

In the Firestone Fast 6, championship hopeful Josef Newgarden took pole position with a time of 01:08.2241, ahead of 2015 race winner Scott Dixon in second and Meyer Shank Racing's Hélio Castroneves in third.

=== Qualifying classification ===
Pos	No.	Driver	Team	Engine	Time				Final grid
Pos	No.	Driver	Team	Engine	Round 1		Round 2	Round 3	Final grid
Pos	No.	Driver	Team	Engine	Group 1	Group 2	Round 2	Round 3	Final grid
1	2	(United States) Josef Newgarden	Team Penske	Chevrolet	**01:08.5080**	N/A	01:08.5673	**01:08.2241**	1
2	9	(New Zealand) Scott Dixon **W**	Chip Ganassi Racing	Honda	01:08.5705	N/A	01:08.3110	01:08.4422	2
3	06	(Brazil) Hélio Castroneves	Meyer Shank Racing	Honda	N/A	01:08.6995	01:08.5561	01:08.4827	3
4	22	(France) Simon Pagenaud **W**	Team Penske	Chevrolet	N/A	01:08.6641	01:08.5307	01:08.6514	4
5	7	(Sweden) Felix Rosenqvist	Arrow McLaren SP	Chevrolet	N/A	**01:08.6223**	01:08.6294	01:08.7461	5
6	51	(France) Romain Grosjean **R**	Dale Coyne Racing with Rick Ware Racing	Honda	N/A	01:08.7144	**01:08.1776**	01:08.7577	6
7	29	(Canada) James Hinchcliffe **W**	Andretti Steinbrenner Autosport	Honda	N/A	01:08.8436	01:08.7143	N/A	7
8	5	(Mexico) Pato O'Ward	Arrow McLaren SP	Chevrolet	01:08.7717	N/A	01:08.8339	N/A	8
9	18	(United Arab Emirates) Ed Jones	Dale Coyne Racing with Vasser-Sullivan	Honda	N/A	01:08.8772	01:08.8797	N/A	9
10	10	(Spain) Álex Palou	Chip Ganassi Racing	Honda	01:08.7114	N/A	01:08.9464	N/A	10
11	28	(United States) Ryan Hunter-Reay **W**	Andretti Autosport	Honda	01:08.8576	N/A	01:09.1330	N/A	11
12	2	(Australia) Will Power **W**	Team Penske	Chevrolet	01:08.8509	N/A	01:09.2279	N/A	12
13	3	(New Zealand) Scott McLaughlin **R**	Chip Ganassi Racing	Honda	01:08.8611	N/A	N/A	N/A	13
14	26	(United States) Colton Herta	Andretti Autosport with Curb Agajanian	Honda	N/A	01:09.1094	N/A	N/A	14
15	27	(United States) Alexander Rossi **W**	Andretti Autosport	Honda	01:08.9946	N/A	N/A	N/A	15
16	30	(Japan) Takuma Sato **W**	Rahal Letterman Lanigan Racing	Honda	N/A	01:09.3814	N/A	N/A	16
17	8	(Sweden) Marcus Ericsson	Chip Ganassi Racing	Honda	01:09.1368	N/A	N/A	N/A	17
18	77	(United Kingdom) Callum Ilott **R**	Juncos Hollinger Racing	Chevrolet	N/A	01:09.4360	N/A	N/A	18
19	15	(United States) Graham Rahal	Rahal Letterman Lanigan Racing	Honda	01:09.3998	N/A	N/A	N/A	19
20	11	(United States) Charlie Kimball	A. J. Foyt Enterprises	Chevrolet	N/A	01:09.6793	N/A	N/A	20
21	20	(United States) Conor Daly	Ed Carpenter Racing	Chevrolet	01:09.5816	N/A	N/A	N/A	21
22	14	(France) Sébastien Bourdais	A. J. Foyt Enterprises	Chevrolet	N/A	01:09.7022	N/A	N/A	22
23	59	(United Kingdom) Max Chilton	Carlin	Chevrolet	01:09.7525	N/A	N/A	N/A	22
24	21	(Netherlands) Rinus VeeKay	Ed Carpenter Racing	Chevrolet	N/A	01:09.7602	N/A	N/A	24
25	60	(United Kingdom) Jack Harvey	Meyer Shank Racing	Honda	01:10.4664	N/A	N/A	N/A	25
26	4	(Canada) Dalton Kellett	A. J. Foyt Enterprises	Chevrolet	N/A	01:09.9144	N/A	N/A	26
27	48	(United States) Jimmie Johnson **R**	Chip Ganassi Racing	Honda	01:10.5127	N/A	N/A	N/A	27
28	45	(United States) Oliver Askew	Rahal Letterman Lanigan Racing	Honda	N/A	01:10.0178	N/A	N/A	28

Notes

- **Bold text** indicates fastest time set in session.

== Warmup ==
The pre-race warmup session took place at 12:00 PM ET on September 26, 2021. Ten minutes into the 30-minute session, Alexander Rossi and Hélio Castroneves collided at the fountain section, causing terminal damage to Castroneves' suspension, ending his warmup session prematurely. Rossi was able to continue and finish the session. Colton Herta topped the session with a time of 01:08.4762. Previous race winners Scott Dixon and Simon Pagenaud came second and third respectively.

Top Warmup Speeds
Pos	No.	Driver	Team	Engine	Lap Time
1	26	(United States) Colton Herta	Andretti Autosport with Curb Agajanian	Honda	01:08.4762
2	9	(New Zealand) Scott Dixon W	Chip Ganassi Racing	Honda	01:08.6507
3	22	(France) Simon Pagenaud W	Team Penske	Chevrolet	01:08.8029

== Race ==
The race started at 3:00 PM ET on September 26, 2021. The first lap saw the first caution of the day being triggered, as Ed Jones hit the rear of Pato O'Ward's No. 5 Arrow McLaren SP car at the hairpin in Turn 11, causing O'Ward to spin in the wrong direction. Jones received a drive-through penalty for the incident. At the same lap, Ryan Hunter-Reay experienced a puncture in his right rear tire after contact with Colton Herta, prompting Hunter-Reay to pit, and Sébastien Bourdais spun and stalled his car. The caution lasted two laps and the race went underway again on lap 4.

On lap 17, O'Ward came to a halt on the main straight and eventually retired from the race, due to a broken driveshaft sustained from the first-lap incident, effectively ending his championship hopes. A second caution was brought out, prompting numerous drivers to pit. On lap 25, the race was green flagged, with Hélio Castroneves leading the pack. One lap later, another caution was triggered, which lasted four laps, as Marcus Ericsson crashed into the tire wall in Turn 1, after dueling with Alexander Rossi. On lap 34, Juncos Hollinger Racing's Callum Ilott spun his No. 77 into a run-off area. Ilott's spin prompted Castroneves to make his pit stop, in anticipation of a caution being brought out, but only a local yellow was flagged instead. As a result, Colton Herta took the lead from Castroneves.

On lap 62, Oliver Askew and Conor Daly made contact on the back straight, causing Askew to crash into the tire barriers and Daly to wander into the run-off area. The incident brought out the fourth and final caution of the race, which lasted three laps.

Colton Herta took the victory, finishing half a second ahead of polesitter Josef Newgarden. Chip Ganassi Racing's Scott Dixon took the final podium spot, with teammate Álex Palou finishing fourth behind him, clinching his first championship win.

=== Race classification ===
Pos	No.	Driver	Team	Engine	Laps	Time/Retired	Pit Stops	Grid	Laps Led	Pts.
1	26	(United States) Colton Herta	Andretti Autosport with Curb Agajanian	Honda	85	1:49:10.3764	2	14	43	53
2	2	(United States) Josef Newgarden	Team Penske	Chevrolet	85	+0.5883	2	1	18	42
3	9	(New Zealand) Scott Dixon W	Chip Ganassi Racing	Honda	85	+1.0752	2	2	1	36
4	10	(Spain) Álex Palou	Chip Ganassi Racing	Honda	85	+2.4120	2	10		32
5	22	(France) Simon Pagenaud W	Team Penske	Chevrolet	85	+3.1237	2	4		30
6	27	(United States) Alexander Rossi W	Andretti Autosport	Honda	85	+4.6739	2	15		28
7	60	(United Kingdom) Jack Harvey	Meyer Shank Racing	Honda	85	+6.3467	2	25	1	27
8	14	(France) Sébastien Bourdais	A. J. Foyt Enterprises	Chevrolet	85	+8.0275	2	22		24
9	30	(Japan) Takuma Sato W	Rahal Letterman Lanigan Racing	Honda	85	+10.5939	2	16		22
10	12	(Australia) Will Power W	Team Penske	Chevrolet	85	+11.4297	2	12		20
11	3	(New Zealand) Scott McLaughlin R	Team Penske	Chevrolet	85	+12.3327	2	13		19
12	18	(United Arab Emirates) Ed Jones	Dale Coyne Racing with Vasser-Sullivan	Honda	85	+26.9660	3	9		18
13	7	(Sweden) Felix Rosenqvist	Arrow McLaren SP	Chevrolet	85	+27.4167	2	5		17
14	29	(Canada) James Hinchcliffe W	Andretti Steinbrenner Autosport	Honda	85	+27.9725	2	7		16
15	59	(United Kingdom) Max Chilton	Carlin	Chevrolet	85	+30.0358	2	23		15
16	15	(United States) Graham Rahal	Rahal Letterman Lanigan Racing	Honda	85	+30.3482	3	19	4	15
17	48	(United States) Jimmie Johnson R	Chip Ganassi Racing	Honda	85	+31.1603	3	27		13
18	11	(United States) Charlie Kimball	A. J. Foyt Enterprises	Chevrolet	85	+32.1546	2	20		12
19	4	(Canada) Dalton Kellett	A. J. Foyt Enterprises	Chevrolet	85	+32.1585	2	26		11
20	06	(Brazil) Hélio Castroneves	Meyer Shank Racing	Honda	85	+32.6206	2	3	15	11
21	20	(United States) Conor Daly	Ed Carpenter Racing	Chevrolet	84	+1 Lap	3	21		9
22	45	(United States) Oliver Askew	Rahal Letterman Lanigan Racing	Chevrolet	83	+2 Laps	5	28	3	9
23	28	(United States) Ryan Hunter-Reay W	Andretti Autosport	Honda	83	+2 Laps	4	11		7
24	51	(France) Romain Grosjean R	Dale Coyne Racing with Rick Ware Racing	Honda	75	Contact	3	6		6
25	21	(Netherlands) Rinus VeeKay	Ed Carpenter Racing	Chevrolet	48	Mechanical	2	24		5
26	77	(United Kingdom) Callum Ilott R	Juncos Hollinger Racing	Chevrolet	47	Mechanical	1	18		5
27	5	(Mexico) Pato O'Ward	Arrow McLaren SP	Chevrolet	43	Contact	2	8		5
28	8	(Sweden) Marcus Ericsson	Chip Ganassi Racing	Honda	25	Contact	1	17		5
Fastest lap: (Mexico) Pato O'Ward (Arrow McLaren SP) – 01:09.1407 (lap 22)

== Championship standings after the race ==
Álex Palou of Chip Ganassi Racing won his first IndyCar drivers' title with his fourth-place finish. Josef Newgarden finished the season as championship runner-up, with him finishing second and Pato O'Ward dropping down to third in the standings, after O'Ward only scored five points due to the premature end to his race. Scott Dixon closed out the season in fourth. Colton Herta jumped to fifth after his win, demoting Marcus Ericsson to sixth.

Scott McLaughlin was the highest-placing rookie in the final standings and was therefore crowned Rookie of the Year, finishing 14th in the standings with 305 points over fellow rookie Romain Grosjean in 15th with 272 points.

Drivers' Championship standings

	Pos.	Driver	Points
Unchanged	1	(Spain) **Álex Palou**	549
1	2	(United States) Josef Newgarden	511
1	3	(Mexico) Pato O'Ward	487
Unchanged	4	(New Zealand) Scott Dixon	481
1	5	(United States) Colton Herta	455

Engine manufacturer standings

	Pos.	Manufacturer	Points
Unchanged	1	**Honda**	1401
Unchanged	2	Chevrolet	1238

- Note: Only the top five positions are included.
- **Bold text** indicates Championship Winners.
