= Konsta Lappalainen =

Finland racing driver (born 2001)

- Nationality: Finland
- Born: Konsta Johannes Lappalainen; 11 August 2001 (age 25) Espoo, Finland

GT World Challenge Europe Sprint Cup career
- Debut season: 2021
- Current team: Emil Frey Racing
- Categorisation: FIA Silver (until 2024); FIA Gold (2025–)
- Car number: 14
- Starts: 44 (44 entries)
- Wins: 1
- Podiums: 4
- Poles: 3
- Fastest laps: 1
- Best finish: 7th in 2021

Previous series
- 2021-22 2019-21 2018 2017-18 2017: GTWC Europe Endurance Cup; FR European Championship; ADAC Formula 4 SMP F4 Championship; F4 Spanish Championship

Konsta Johannes Lappalainen (born 11 August 2001) is a Finnish racing driver who currently competes in the GT World Challenge Europe Sprint Cup for Emil Frey Racing.

Lappalainen is the 2018 SMP F4 champion and an ADAC GT Masters race winner.

== Early career ==
=== Karting ===
Born and raised in Espoo, Lappalainen started his karting career in 2012. His best result was winning the Finnish Karting Championship in the OK class in 2016.

=== Lower formulae ===
In 2016, Lappalainen made his single-seater racing debut with part-time appearances in the F4 Spanish Championship. He finished all races in the top ten, however due to him being a guest driver, Lappalainen didn't score any points.

The next year, Lappalainen continued racing in Spain, whilst also driving in SMP F4. He struggled in both series however, finishing 15th and 13th in the respective championships.

In 2018, Lappalainen continued in the SMP F4 Championship. He won seven races and scored fifteen podiums, winning the championship 41 points ahead of Michael Belov.

=== Formula Regional European Championship ===
In 2019, KIC Motorsport announced that Lappalainen would drive for them in the inaugural season of the Formula Regional European Championship alongside Isac Blomqvist. He finished third at the Red Bull Ring, the only podium of his season, and ended the season in 11th in the standings.

Lappalainen would continue driving for KIC in 2020. His season would be much more successful, as he scored two podiums and finished sixth in the drivers' championship, although Lappalainen was beaten by his teammate Patrik Pasma.

== Sportscar career ==
In 2021, Lappalainen would move across to sportscar racing, driving for Emil Frey Racing in both the GT World Challenge Europe Endurance and Sprint cups. Partnering Jack Aitken and Arthur Rougier in the former, the trio would fail to score in the opening three rounds; this negative streak being compounded by a crash which injured Aitken at the 24 Hours of Spa. At the final two races however, the team were able to take a pair of top-six finishes, leading Lappalainen to finish 16th in the standings.

The following year, a return to Emil Frey in the Silver Cup class of the GTWC Europe Endurance Cup was coupled with a full-time campaign in the ADAC GT Masters, in which Lappalainen would be joined by Mick Wishofer. Lappalainen's campaign in GT Masters yielded little success, as he and Wishofer ended up 17th overall, though the pair managed to take victory at Zandvoort, where a pole position and charging first stint by Wishofer gave Lappalainen to take over the car in first position, leading to an uninterrupted run towards the checkered flag. In the Endurance Cup, Lappalainen managed to finish on the podium of his class at the 24 Hours of Spa, before taking the team's only class win at the Hockenheimring. Another podium at the season finale in Barcelona earned the team third place in the Silver Cup championship.

Remaining with Emil Frey for a third successive season in 2023, Lappalainen would concentrate his efforts to compete in the GT World Challenge Europe Sprint Cup alongside Giacomo Altoè, driving the new Ferrari 296 GT3. After two points-earning races at Brands Hatch to start the season off, Lappalainen and Altoè would score their first podium of the year in Misano, finishing second. After a pointless round in Germany the pair went on to finish inside the top-ten in all remaining races, thus ending up seventh in the standings. Lappalainen went into the 2024 season with Emil Frey once more, this time together with Ben Green.

== Karting record ==
=== Karting career summary ===
Season	Series	Team	Position
2012	Finnish KF6 Challenge		9th
2013	Rotax Max Challenge Finland - Junior		16th
2013	Andrea Margutti Trophy - 60 Mini		20th
2014	Finnish Championship - KF Junior		10th
2014	CIK-FIA Karting European Championship - KF Junior	Ward Racing	32nd
2015	WSK Champions Cup - KF Junior		23rd
2015	20° South Garda Winter Cup - KF Junior	Ward Racing	18th
2015	CIK-FIA Karting World Championship - KF Junior	Ward Racing	22nd
2015	WSK Super Master Series - KF Junior		41st
2015	CIK-FIA Karting European Championship - KF Junior		30th
2015	WSK Final Cup - KF Junior		28th
2015	Trofeo delle Industrie - KF Junior		8th
2015	Finnish Cup Championship - KF Junior		4th
2016	WSK Champions Cup - OK	Ward Racing	14th
2016	CIK-FIA Karting World Championship - OK	Ward Racing	23rd
2016	WSK Super Master Series - OK		18th
2016	CIK-FIA Karting European Championship - OK		21st
2016	Finnish Championship - OK		1st

== Racing record ==
=== Racing career summary ===
Season	Series	Team	Races	Wins	Poles	F/Laps	Podiums	Points	Position
2016	F4 Spanish Championship	Double R Racing	5	0	0	0	0	0	NC†
2016	Formula STCC Nordic	FinnDrive	2	0	0	0	0	12	10th
2017	SMP F4 Championship	Lappalainen Team	3	0	0	0	1	16	15th
2017	F4 Spanish Championship	SMP Racing	3	0	0	0	0	16	13th
2017	F4 Spanish Championship	Kart in Club Driving Academy	9	0	0	0	0	16	13th
2017	Formula STCC Nordic	Kart in Club Driving Academy	14	2	2	1	9	222	**2nd**
2018	SMP F4 Championship	Kart in Club Driving Academy	21	7	4	3	15	316	**1st**
2018	ADAC Formula 4 Championship	Kart in Club Driving Academy	11	0	0	0	0	19	15th
2018	Formula Academy Finland	N/A	6	3	0	1	5	123	4th
2019	Formula Regional European Championship	KIC Motorsport	23	0	0	0	1	56	11th
2020	Formula Regional European Championship	KIC Motorsport	22	0	0	1	2	140	6th
2021	GT World Challenge Europe Sprint Cup	Emil Frey Racing	10	0	0	0	0	20.5	15th
2021	GT World Challenge Europe Sprint Cup - Silver Cup	Emil Frey Racing	4	0	0	0	1	18.5	14th
2021	GT World Challenge Europe Endurance Cup	Emil Frey Racing	5	0	0	0	0	18	16th
2021	Formula Regional European Championship	KIC Motorsport	2	0	0	0	0	0	NC†
2022	ADAC GT Masters	Emil Frey Racing	13	1	1	0	1	83	17th
2022	GT World Challenge Europe Endurance Cup	Emil Frey Racing	5	0	0	0	0	6	31st
2023	GT World Challenge Europe Sprint Cup	Emil Frey Racing	10	0	0	0	1	41	7th
2023	Formula Regional European Championship	KIC Motorsport	2	0	0	0	0	0	36th
2023	British GT Championship - GT3	7TSIX	1	0	0	0	0	0	NC†
2024	GT World Challenge Europe Sprint Cup	Emil Frey Racing	10	1	2	1	3	62.5	**3rd**
2024	Italian GT Sprint Championship - GT3	AF Corse	2	0	0	0	1	12	NC†
2025	GT World Challenge Europe Sprint Cup	Emil Frey Racing	10	0	1	0	0	18.5	9th
2025	Suzuka 1000 km - Pro-Am	Johor Motorsports JMR	1	0	0	0	1	N/A	**3rd**
2026	GT World Challenge Europe Sprint Cup	Emil Frey Racing	10	0	1	1	1	17.5	17th
2026	GT World Challenge Europe Endurance Cup	JMW Motorsport	2	0	0	0	0	0	NC

^{†} As Lappalainen was a guest driver, he was ineligible for championship points. ^{*} Season still in progress.

=== Complete F4 Spanish Championship results ===
(key) (Races in bold indicate pole position) (Races in italics indicate fastest lap)

Year	Team	1	2	3	4	5	6	7	8	9	10	11	12	13	14	15	16	17	18	19	20	Pos	Points
2016	Double R Racing	NAV; 1	NAV; 2	NAV; 3	ALC; 1	ALC; 2	ALC; 3	ALG; 1	ALG; 2	ALG; 3	VAL; 1	VAL; 2	VAL; 3	CAT; 1; 7	CAT; 2; 7	JAR; 1	JAR; 2	JAR; 3	JER; 1; 6	JER; 2; 9	JER; 3; 9	NC	-
2017	Kart in Club Driving Academy	ALC; 1	ALC; 2	ALC; 3	NAV1; 1	NAV1; 2	NAV1; 3	CAT; 1	CAT; 2	JER; 1; 12	JER; 2; 9	JER; 3; 8	NAV2; 1; 13	NAV2; 2; 11	NAV2; 3; 12	NOG; 1 Ret	NOG; 2; 9	NOG; 3; 9	EST; 1; 9	EST; 2; 10	EST; 3; 6	13th	16

† As Lappalainen was a guest driver, he was ineligible for points

=== Complete Formula STCC Nordic results ===
(key) (Races in bold indicate pole position) (Races in italics indicate fastest lap)

Year	Team	1	2	3	4	5	6	7	8	9	10	11	12	13	14	Pos	Points
2016	FinnDrive	SKÖ; 1	SKÖ; 2	MAN; 1	MAN; 2	AND; 1	AND; 2	FAL; 1	FAL; 2	KAR; 1	KAR; 2	ALA; 1	ALA; 2	KNU; 1; 6	KNU; 2; 8	10th	12
2017	Kart in Club Driving Academy	KNU; 1; 4	KNU; 2; 3	ALA; 1; 3	ALA; 2; 3	RUD; 1; 4	RUD; 2; 2	**FAL**; **1**; 1	**FAL**; **2**; 1	KAR; 1; 4	KAR; 2; 3	AND; 1; 3	AND; 2; 2	MAN; 1; 4	MAN; 2; 5	2nd	222

=== Complete SMP F4 Championship results ===
(key) (Races in bold indicate pole position) (Races in italics indicate fastest lap)

Year	Team	1	2	3	4	5	6	7	8	9	10	11	12	13	14	15	16	17	18	19	20	21	Pos	Points
2017	SMP Racing	SOC; 1	SOC; 2	SOC; 3	SMO; 1	SMO; 2	SMO; 3	AHV; 1	AHV; 2	AHV; 3	AUD; 1	AUD; 2	AUD; 3	MSC1; 1	MSC1; 2	MSC1; 3	MSC2; 1	MSC2; 2	MSC2; 3	ASS; 1; 3	ASS; 2; 12	ASS; 3; 10	15th	16
2018	Kart In Club Driving Academy	SMO; 1; 6	SMO; 2; 2	SMO; 3; 2	**NRG**; **1**; 5	**NRG**; **2** Ret	NRG; 3; 5	**MSC**; **1**; 1	**MSC**; **2**; 3	**MSC**; **3**; 1	**ADM**; **1**; 1	**ADM**; **2**; 1	ADM; 3; 2	AHV; 1; 1	AHV; 2; 4	AHV; 3; 3	ALA; 1; 1	ALA; 2; 2	ALA; 3; 1	ASS; 1 Ret	ASS; 2; 2	ASS; 3; 2	1st	316

=== Complete ADAC Formula 4 Championship results ===
(key) (Races in bold indicate pole position) (Races in italics indicate fastest lap)

Year	Team	1	2	3	4	5	6	7	8	9	10	11	12	13	14	15	16	17	18	19	20	Pos	Points
2018	KIC Driving Academy	OSC; 1; 7	OSC; 2 DSQ	OSC; 3; 11	HOC1; 1	HOC1; 2	HOC1; 3	LAU; 1; 4	LAU; 2; 15	LAU; 3; 11	RBR; 1	RBR; 2	RBR; 3	HOC2; 1; 20	HOC2; 2; 22†	NÜR; 1; 12	NÜR; 2; 13	NÜR; 3; 11	HOC3; 1	HOC3; 2	HOC3; 3	15th	19

=== Complete Formula Regional European Championship results ===
(key) (Races in bold indicate pole position; races in italics indicate fastest lap)

Year	Entrant	1	2	3	4	5	6	7	8	9	10	11	12	13	14	15	16	17	18	19	20	21	22	23	24	25	DC	Points
2019	KIC Motorsport	LEC; 1; 7	LEC; 2; 7	LEC; 3 Ret	VLL; 1; 12	VLL; 2; 11	VLL; 3 C	HUN; 1; 10	HUN; 2; 9	HUN; 3 Ret	RBR; 1; 12	RBR; 2; 3	RBR; 3; 9	IMO; 1; 11	IMO; 2; 9	IMO; 3; 8	IMO; 4; 8	CAT; 1 Ret	CAT; 2; 9	CAT; 3; 8	MUG; 1; 12	MUG; 2; 9	MUG; 3; 13	MNZ; 1; 9	MNZ; 2; 9	MNZ; 3; 10	11th	56
2020	KIC Motorsport	MIS; 1; 9†	MIS; 2; 7	MIS; 3 Ret	LEC; 1; 8	LEC; 2 Ret	LEC; 3; 6	RBR; 1 Ret	RBR; 2; 7	RBR; 3; 11	MUG; 1; 7	MUG; 2 DNS	MUG; 3; 5	MNZ; 1; 7	MNZ; 2; 2	MNZ; 3; 3	CAT; 1; 6	CAT; 2; 10	CAT; 3; 7	IMO; 1; 5	IMO; 2; 7	IMO; 3; 8	VLL; 1; 5	VLL; 2 C	VLL; 3; 4		6th	140
2021	KIC Motorsport	IMO; 1	IMO; 2	CAT; 1	CAT; 2	MCO; 1	MCO; 2	LEC; 1	LEC; 2	ZAN; 1	ZAN; 2	SPA; 1	SPA; 2	RBR; 1	RBR; 2	VAL; 1	VAL; 2	MUG; 1	MUG; 2	MNZ; 1 Ret	MNZ; 2; 30						NC†	0
2023	KIC Motorsport	IMO; 1	IMO; 2	CAT; 1	CAT; 2	HUN; 1	HUN; 2	SPA; 1	SPA; 2	MUG; 1; 23	MUG; 2; 18	LEC; 1	LEC; 2	RBR; 1	RBR; 2	MNZ; 1	MNZ; 2	ZAN; 1	ZAN; 2	HOC; 1	HOC; 2						36th	0

^{†} As Lappalainen was a guest driver, he was ineligible to score points.

=== Complete GT World Challenge Europe results ===
==== GT World Challenge Europe Sprint Cup ====
(key) (Races in bold indicate pole position) (Races in italics indicate fastest lap)

Year	Team	Car	Class	1	2	3	4	5	6	7	8	9	10	Pos.	Points
2021	Emil Frey Racing	Lamborghini Huracán GT3 Evo	Pro	MAG; 1; 12	MAG; 2; 9	ZAN; 1; 15	ZAN; 2; 4	MIS; 1; 7	MIS; 2; 5					15th	20.5
2021	Emil Frey Racing	Lamborghini Huracán GT3 Evo	Silver							BRH; 1; 8	BRH; 2; 20	VAL; 1; 9	VAL; 2 Ret	14th	18.5
2023	Emil Frey Racing	Ferrari 296 GT3	Pro	BRH; 1; 5	BRH; 2; 8	MIS; 1; 2	MIS; 2; 6	HOC; 1 Ret	HOC; 2; 12	VAL; 1; 7	VAL; 2; 5	ZAN; 1; 10	ZAN; 2; 5	7th	41
2024	Emil Frey Racing	Ferrari 296 GT3	Pro	**BRH**; **1**; 2	BRH; 2; 5	MIS; 1; 4	MIS; 2; 7	HOC; 1; 3	HOC; 2; 1	**MAG**; **1**; 5	MAG; 2; 13	CAT; 1; 4	CAT; 2; 12	3rd	62.5
2025	Emil Frey Racing	Ferrari 296 GT3	Pro	BRH; 1; 4	BRH; 2; 5	ZAN; 1 Ret	**ZAN**; **2**; 11	MIS; 1; 8	MIS; 2; 15	MAG; 1; 8	MAG; 2; 13	VAL; 1; 12	VAL; 2 Ret	9th	18.5
2026	Emil Frey Racing	Ferrari 296 GT3 Evo	Pro	BRH; 1; 5	BRH; 2; 9	MIS; 1; 22	MIS; 2 Ret	MAG; 1; 28	MAG; 2; 17	ZAN; 1; 16	**ZAN**; **2**; 3	CAT; 1 Ret	CAT; 2; 13	17th	17.5

^{*} Season still in progress.

==== GT World Challenge Europe Endurance Cup ====
(Races in bold indicate pole position) (Races in italics indicate fastest lap)

Year	Team	Car	Class	1	2	3	4	5	6	7	Pos.	Points
2021	Emil Frey Racing	Lamborghini Huracán GT3 Evo	Pro	MNZ; Ret	LEC; 37†	SPA; 6H; 55†	SPA; 12H; Ret	SPA; 24H; Ret	NÜR; 5	CAT; 6	16th	18
2022	Emil Frey Racing	Lamborghini Huracán GT3 Evo	Silver	IMO; 28	LEC; Ret	SPA; 6H; 17	SPA; 12H; 18	SPA; 24H; 16	HOC; 7	CAT; 14	3rd	73
2026	JMW Motorsport	Ferrari 296 GT3 Evo	Pro	LEC	MNZ	SPA; 6H	SPA; 12H	SPA; 24H	NÜR; 30		NC	0
2026	JMW Motorsport	Ferrari 296 GT3 Evo	Gold							ALG; 17	18th	15

=== Complete ADAC GT Masters results ===
(key) (Races in bold indicate pole position) (Races in italics indicate fastest lap)

Year	Team	Car	1	2	3	4	5	6	7	8	9	10	11	12	13	14	DC	Points
2022	Emil Frey Racing	Lamborghini Huracán GT3 Evo	OSC; 1; 6	OSC; 2; 11	RBR; 1; 18	RBR; 2 DNS	**ZAN**; **1**; 1	ZAN; 2; 19	NÜR; 1; 11	NÜR; 2; 6	LAU; 1; 21	LAU; 2; 16	SAC; 1; 12	SAC; 2 Ret	HOC; 1; 6	HOC; 2; 5	17th	83

=== Complete British GT Championship results ===
(key) (Races in bold indicate pole position in class) (Races in italics indicate fastest lap in class)

Year	Team	Car	Class	1	2	3	4	5	6	7	8	9	DC	Points
2023	7TSIX	Mercedes-AMG GT3 Evo	GT3	OUL; 1	OUL; 2	SIL; 1	DON; 1	SNE; 1	SNE; 2	ALG; 1; 7	BRH; 1	DON; 1	NC†	0†

^{†} As Lappalainen was a guest driver, he was ineligible for points.

Sporting positions
Preceded by Christian Lundgaard	SMP F4 Championship; Champion; 2018	Succeeded by Pavel Bulantsev
