= Linus Lundqvist =

Swedish racing driver (born 1999)

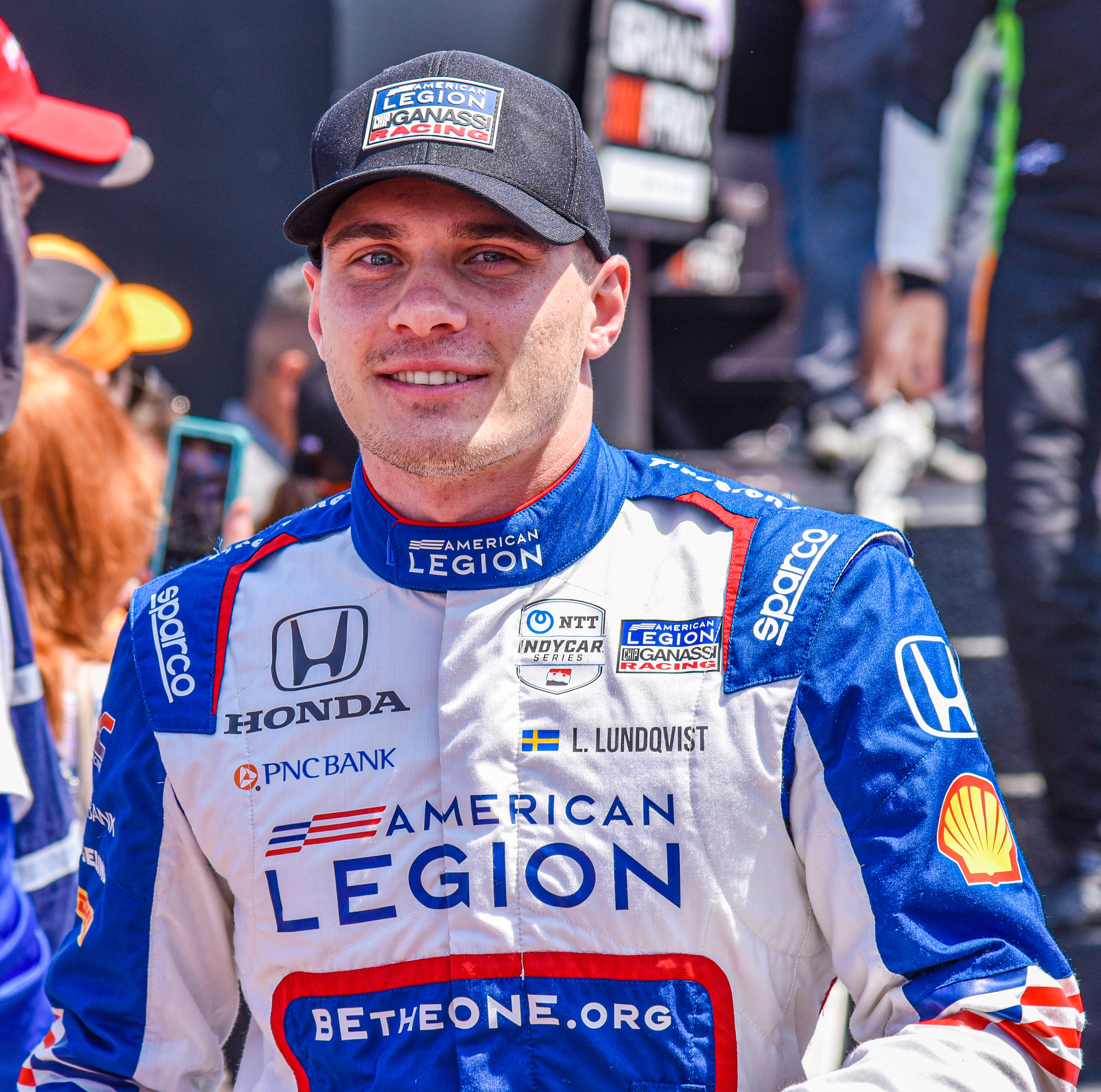
- Lundqvist in 2024
- Nationality: (Sweden) Swedish
- Born: Linus Hans Fredrik Lundqvist; 26 March 1999 (age 27) Tyresö, Sweden
- Categorisation: FIA Gold

IndyCar Series career
- 20 races run over 2 years
- Best finish: 16th (2024)
- First race: 2023 Music City Grand Prix (Streets of Nashville)
- Last race: 2024 Music City Grand Prix (Nashville Superspeedway)
Wins	Podiums	Poles
0	2	1

Previous series
- 2023–2024 2021–2022 2020 2019, 2022 2019 2018, 2019, 2023 2017–2018 2017 2015–2016: IndyCar; Indy Lights; FR Americas; IMSA SportsCar; Euroformula Open; Porsche Carrera Cup Scandinavia British Formula 3 F4 British; Formula Renault 1.6 Nordic / Formula STCC Nordic

Championship titles
- 2022 2020 2018: Indy Lights; FR Americas; BRDC British F3

Awards
- 2019: Sunoco Whelen Challenge

Linus Hans Fredrik Lundqvist (Swedish: [ˈliːnɵs ˈlɵnːd.kvɪsːt]; born 26 March 1999) is a Swedish racing driver who most recently competed in a one-off Eurocup-3 weekend for Double R Racing. He had previously competed full-time in the 2024 IndyCar Series for Chip Ganassi Racing.

Lundqvist made his IndyCar debut in 2023 with Meyer Shank Racing and claimed Rookie of the Year honors the following year in his first and only full-season campaign to date. He is the 2022 Indy Lights champion and the 2020 Formula Regional Americas champion.

== Career ==
=== Karting ===
Born in Tyresö, Lundqvist began karting at the age of six during a holiday in Finland and from there contested numerous championships in his native Sweden and across Europe and won numerous titles.

=== Lower formulae ===
In 2015, Lundqvist made his single-seater debut in the Formula Renault 1.6 Nordic championship with Team TIDÖ, where he claimed fourth in the Nordic championship, second in the JSM standings and third in the NEZ championship. The following year, Lundqvist returned to the renamed Formula STCC Nordic championship with the LL Motorsport Junior Team, where he dominated proceedings to claim ten wins and finish as Drivers and NEZ champion.

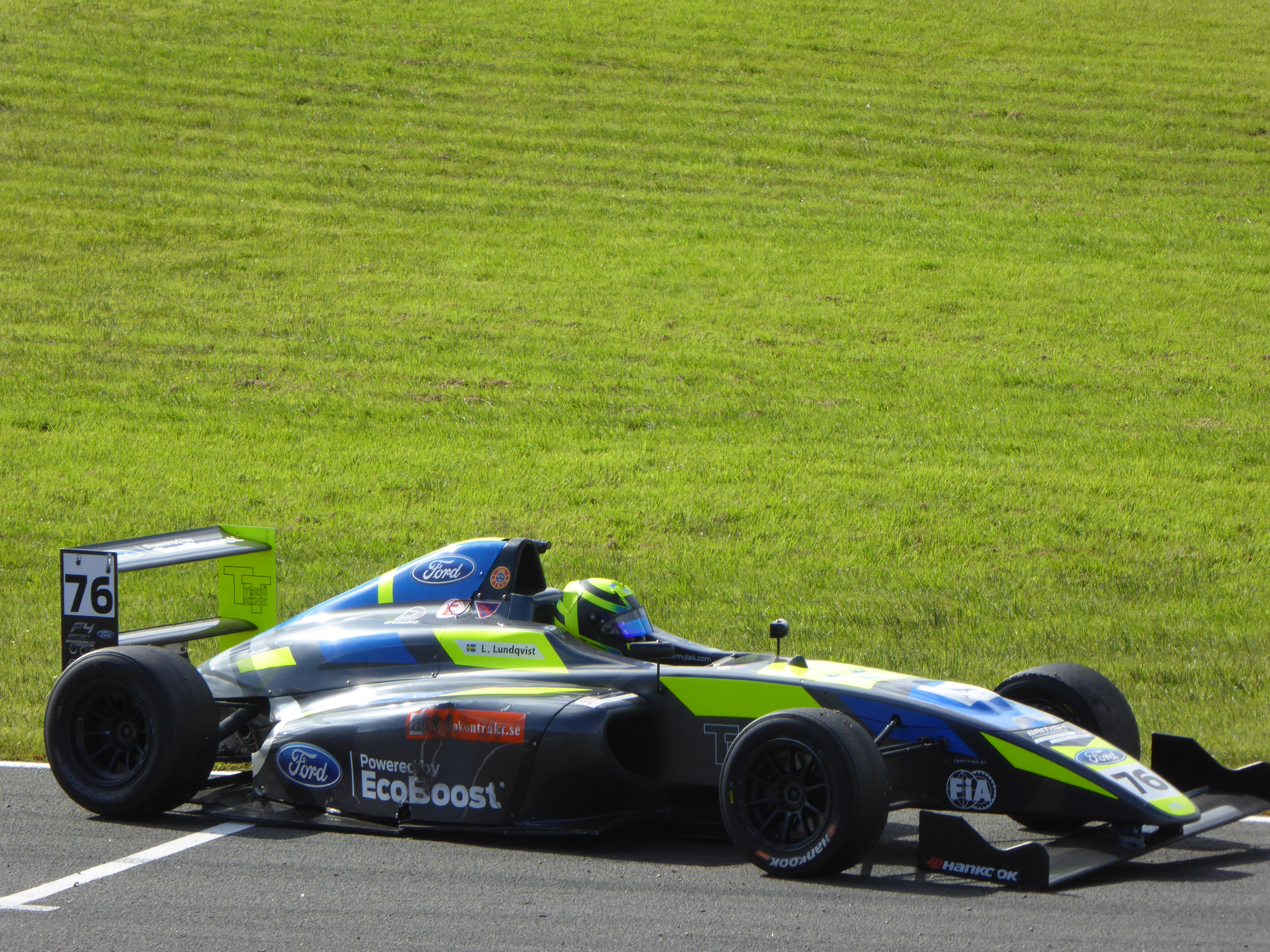
Lundqvist at the Knockhill round of the 2017 F4 British Championship

In 2017, Lundqvist moved across to the British F4 championship with Double R Racing. In the championship, he claimed five victories but a string of inconsistent performances meant he could only achieve fifth in the drivers' standings.

=== BRDC F3 Championship ===
In July 2017, Lundqvist made his debut in the BRDC British Formula 3 championship, again with Double R. There he achieved three points finishes, the highest being a seventh in the third race.

In February 2018, Double R announced Lundqvist would contest the championship full-time. There he claimed seven wins and three pole positions to claim the title at Silverstone after a season-long battle with Nicolai Kjærgaard.

=== GP3 Series ===
In November 2018, Campos Racing confirmed they would run Lundqvist in the post-season test at Yas Marina.

=== Euroformula Open Championship ===
After taking part in the winter series and pre-season testing with Campos Racing, Lundqvist once again teamed up with Double R to compete in the Euroformula Open Championship.

=== Formula Regional Americas ===
In April 2020, Global Racing Group announced Lundqvist would race with them in the 2020 championship. In a dominant display, Lundqvist claimed sixteen of the eighteen race wins on offer and took the championship title at the penultimate round at Homestead.

=== Indy Lights ===
As part of winning the Formula Regional Americas title, Lundqvist received a Honda-backed scholarship to contest the 2021 championship. In January 2021, Lundqvist announced he would join the grid with GRG with HMD Motorsports. He scored three wins and eleven podiums in twenty races, finishing third in points.

Lundqvist entered the 2022 Indy Lights season driving for HMD with Dale Coyne Racing. He earned five wins and nine podiums in fourteen races to claim the title with a 92-point margin.

=== Eurocup-3 ===
In May 2026, Lundqvist made a return to junior single-seaters, competing in the Eurocup-3 with Double R Racing.

== IMSA SportsCar Championship ==
In November 2018, Lundqvist won the Sunoco Whelen Challenge and received a drive for the 24 Hours of Daytona for 2019 with Precision Performance Motorsports. On 5 January 2022, Alegra Motorsports announced that Lundqvist would compete alongside Maximilian Götz, Daniel Morad and Michael de Quesada in the No. 28 Mercedes for the 2022 24 Hours of Daytona.

== IndyCar Series ==
On 1 November 2021, Lundqvist took part in his first IndyCar test at the Indianapolis Motor Speedway for Andretti Autosport. His next test would come at the Texas Motor Speedway with Rahal Letterman Lanigan Racing in April 2023, which was his first oval test. In June, he completed another test at Sebring.

=== 2023 season ===
Lundqvist made his IndyCar debut with Meyer Shank Racing during the 2023 Big Machine Music City Grand Prix, taking over the Meyer Shank Racing No. 60 car whilst main driver Simon Pagenaud continued to recover from his crash at Mid-Ohio. Lundqvist qualified in an impressive eleventh place. During the race, he regularly ran inside the top-fifteen positions, until he made a mistake heading into turn eleven and crashed out with only twelve laps remaining. He was classified 25th, setting the fastest lap of the race. Lundqvist continued his deputisation role for the next race during the 2023 Gallagher Grand Prix, being the highest-finishing rookie in twelfth place. He drove the No. 60 car a third time at the following race, the 2023 Bommarito Automotive Group 500, which was his first IndyCar oval race. Lundqvist finished eighteenth and set the fastest lap once again in the process. Meyer Shank Racing announced that Lundqvist would be replaced in the No. 60 car for the remaining two rounds by Tom Blomqvist, as Pagenaud would not be fit to return.

=== 2024 season ===
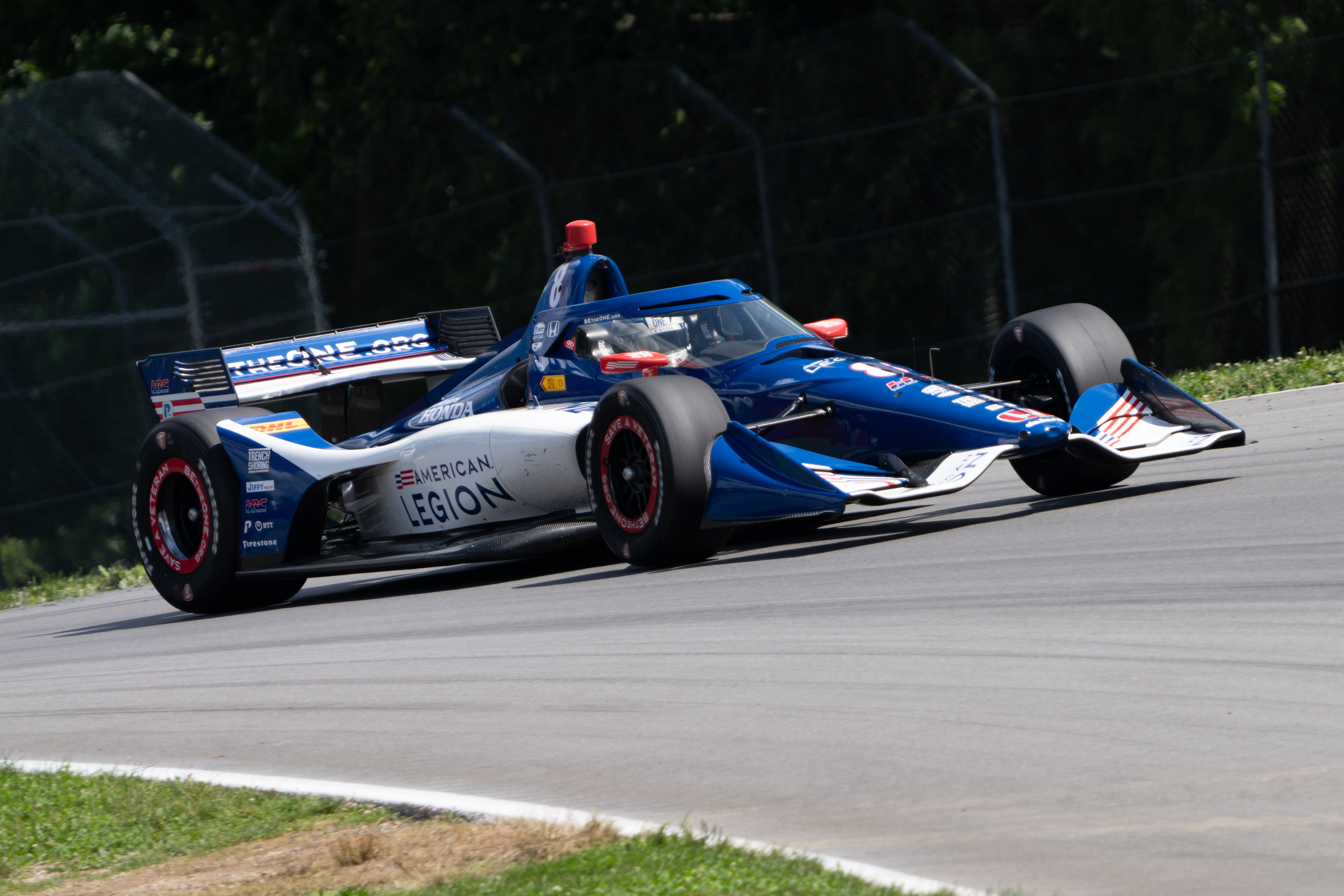
Lundqvist at Mid-Ohio in 2024

On 31 August, it was announced that Lundqvist had signed a multi-year contract with Chip Ganassi Racing for the 2024 season and beyond.

Lundqvist achieved his first IndyCar pole position at the 2024 XPEL Grand Prix at Road America, eventually finishing sixteenth in the overall standings whilst winning Rookie of the Year.

Despite his success throughout the season, Lundqvist was not given a seat on the grid for the 2025 season despite an ongoing multi-year deal. The Swede later stated that he only knew his contract was terminated in mid-January.

== Formula E ==
Lundqvist was invited to take part in the Berlin Formula E rookie test in April 2023 with Andretti Autosport.

== Karting record ==
=== Karting career summary ===
Season	Series	Team	Position
2009	MKR Series Sweden — Formula Micro	Södertälje KRC	10th
2010	MKR Series Sweden — Formula Micro	Södertälje KRC	1st
2010	Swedish Cup — Formula Mini	Södertälje KRC	4th
2010	Götesborgs Stora Pris — Formula Micro		10th
2011	Swedish Karting Championship — Junior 60		5th
2011	MKR Series Sweden — Formula Mini	Södertälje KRC	1st
2011	Juniorfestivalen — Formula Mini		2nd
2011	ROK Cup International Final — Mini ROK		33rd
2012	Swedish Karting Championship — KF3		11th
2012	Rotax Max Challenge Sweden — Junior		6th
2012	ROK Cup International Final — Junior ROK		32nd
2013	Andrea Margutti Trophy — KF3	Ward Racing	13th
2013	Swedish Karting Championship — KFJ	Ward Racing	3rd
2013	NEZ Championship — KF3	Ward Racing	6th
2013	Tom Trana Trophy — KF3		4th
2013	Götesborgs Stora Pris — KF3		26th
2013	FIA Karting European Championship — KFJ		29th
2014	Andrea Margutti Trophy — KF	Ward Racing	17th
2014	Swedish Karting Championship — KF	Ward Racing	11th
2014	FIA Karting European Championship — KF	Ward Racing	24th
2014	CIK-FIA Karting World Championship — KF	Ward Racing	14th

== Racing record ==
=== Career summary ===
Season	Series	Team	Races	Wins	Poles	F/Laps	Podiums	Points	Position
2015	Formula Renault 1.6 Nordic Championship	Team TIDÖ	15	0	0	4	5	150	4th
2015	Formula Renault 1.6 NEZ Championship	Team TIDÖ	4	0	0	1	4	66	**3rd**
2016	Formula STCC Nordic Championship	LL Motorsport Junior Team	14	10	8	10	13	319	**1st**
2016	Formula STCC NEZ Championship	LL Motorsport Junior Team	4	3	2	2	4	90	**1st**
2017	F4 British Championship	Double R Racing	30	5	5	9	13	306.5	5th
2017	BRDC British Formula 3 Championship	Double R Racing	3	0	0	0	0	32	21st
2018	BRDC British Formula 3 Championship	Double R Racing	23	7	3	4	13	531	**1st**
2018	Porsche Carrera Cup Scandinavia	Mtech Competition	2	0	0	0	0	0	NC†
2018–19	MRF Challenge Formula 2000 Championship	MRF Racing	5	0	0	0	1	25	11th
2019	Euroformula Open Championship	Double R Racing	18	0	1	1	2	144	5th
2019	Euroformula Open Winter Series	Campos Racing	2	1	0	0	1	37	**1st**
2019	IMSA SportsCar Championship - GTD	Precision Performance Motorsports	1	0	0	0	0	13	65th
2019	Porsche Carrera Cup Scandinavia	Mtech Competition	2	0	0	1	0	0	NC†
2020	Formula Regional Americas Championship	Global Racing Group	17	15	6	14	16	401	**1st**
2021	Indy Lights	GRG with HMD Motorsports	20	3	3	2	11	449	**3rd**
2022	Indy Lights	HMD Motorsports with Dale Coyne Racing	14	5	7	3	9	575	**1st**
2022	IMSA SportsCar Championship - GTD	Alegra Motorsports	1	0	0	0	0	135	69th
2023	Porsche Carrera Cup Scandinavia	Porsche Experience Racing	4	0	0	0	2	58	13th
2023	IndyCar Series	Meyer Shank Racing	3	0	0	2	0	35	31st
2024	IndyCar Series	Chip Ganassi Racing	18	0	1	0	2	279	16th
2026	Eurocup-3	Double R Racing	3	0	0	0	0	0	34th
2026	Zenith Racing Series - ZP2	Nimbus Racing/Stratus Racing	2	1	0	1	3	N/A	NC†

^{*} Season still in progress.

=== Complete Formula Renault 1.6 Nordic results ===
(key) (Races in bold indicate pole position; races in italics indicate fastest lap)

Year	Team	1	2	3	4	5	6	7	8	9	10	11	12	13	14	15	DC	Points
2015	Team TIDÖ	SKÖ; 1; 8	SKÖ; 2; 4	AND; 1; 5	AND; 2; 5	AND; 3; 9	AHV; 1; 3	AHV; 2; 3	FAL; 1 Ret	FAL; 2; 6	FAL; 3 Ret	KIN; 1; 2	KIN; 2; 4	SOL; 8	KNU; 1; 2	KNU; 2; 2	4th	150
2016	LL Motorsport Junior Team	SKÖ; 1; 2	SKÖ; 2; 1	**MAN**; **1**; 1	**MAN**; **2** EX	**AND**; **1**; 1	**AND**; **2**; 1	FAL; 1; 1	FAL; 2; 2	**KAR**; **1**; 1	**KAR**; **2**; 1	ALA; 1; 3	ALA; 2; 1	**KNU**; **1**; 1	**KNU**; **2**; 1		1st	319

=== Complete F4 British Championship results ===
(key) (Races in bold indicate pole position; races in italics indicate fastest lap)

Year	Team	1	2	3	4	5	6	7	8	9	10	11	12	13	14	15	16	17	18	19	20	21	22	23	24	25	26	27	28	29	30	31	DC	Points
2017	Double R Racing	BHD; 1 Ret	BHD; 2 Ret	BHD; 3 Ret	**DON**; **1**; 2	DON; 2 Ret	**DON**; **3**; 1	THR; 1; 5	THR; 2; 2	THR; 3; 4	OUL; 1; 3	OUL; 2; 5	OUL; 3 C	**CRO**; **1**; 1	CRO; 2; 4	**CRO**; **3**; 1	SNE; 1; 3	SNE; 2; 5	SNE; 3; 3	KNO; 1; 8	KNO; 2 Ret	KNO; 3 Ret	KNO; 4; 6	**ROC**; **1**; 1	ROC; 2 Ret	ROC; 3; 5	SIL; 1; 6	SIL; 2; 9	SIL; 3; 5	BHGP; 1; 1	BHGP; 2; 8	BHGP; 3; 2	5th	306.5

=== Complete BRDC British Formula 3 Championship results ===
(key) (Races in bold indicate pole position; races in italics indicate fastest lap)

Year	Team	1	2	3	4	5	6	7	8	9	10	11	12	13	14	15	16	17	18	19	20	21	22	23	24	DC	Points
2017	Double R Racing	OUL; 1	OUL; 2	OUL; 3	ROC; 1	ROC; 2	ROC; 3	SNE; 1	SNE; 2	SNE; 3	SIL; 1	SIL; 2	SIL; 3	SPA; 1; 16	SPA; 2; 9	SPA; 3; 7	BRH; 1	BRH; 2	BRH; 3	SNE; 1	SNE; 2	SNE; 3	DON; 1	DON; 2	DON; 3	21st	32
2018	Double R Racing	OUL; 1; 1	OUL; 2; 8^{8}	OUL; 3; 5	ROC; 1; 2	ROC; 2; 3^{7}	ROC; 3; 1	SNE; 1; 3	SNE; 2; 4^{11}	**SNE**; **3**; 1	**SIL1**; **1**; 1	SIL1; 2; 6^{11}	SIL1; 3; 2	SPA; 1; 1	SPA; 2; 8^{10}	SPA; 3; 1	BHD; 1; 2	BHD; 2; 11^{3}	BHD; 3; 3	DON; 1; 8	DON; 2 Ret	DON; 3; 11	**SIL2**; **1**; 1	SIL2; 2; 16	SIL2; 3 C	1st	531

=== Complete Euroformula Open Championship results ===
(key) (Races in bold indicate pole position) (Races in italics indicate fastest lap)

Year	Team	1	2	3	4	5	6	7	8	9	10	11	12	13	14	15	16	17	18	Pos	Points
2019	Double R Racing	LEC; 1; 4	LEC; 2; 5	PAU; 1; 5	PAU; 2 Ret	HOC; 1; 5	HOC; 2 Ret	SPA; 1; 9	SPA; 2; 7	HUN; 1; 5	HUN; 2; 5	RBR; 1; 5	RBR; 2; 3	SIL; 1; 7	SIL; 2 (10)	CAT; 1; 3	CAT; 2; 8	**MNZ**; **1**; 5	MNZ; 2; 4	5th	144

=== Complete Eurocup-3 results ===
(key) (Races in bold indicate pole position; races in italics indicate fastest lap)

Year	Team	1	2	3	4	5	6	7	8	9	10	11	12	13	14	15	16	17	18	19	DC	Points
2026	Double R Racing	LEC; 1; 17	LEC; SR; 15	LEC; 2; 24	POR; 1	POR; 2	IMO; 1	IMO; SR	IMO; 2	MNZ; 1	MNZ; 2	SIL; 1	SIL; 2	JER; 1	JER; SR	JER; 2	HUN; 1	HUN; 2	CAT; 1	CAT; 2	34th	0

=== American open–wheel racing results ===
==== Formula Regional Americas Championship ====
(key) (Races in bold indicate pole position) (Races in italics indicate fastest lap)

Year	Team	1	2	3	4	5	6	7	8	9	10	11	12	13	14	15	16	17	Pos	Points
2020	Global Racing Group	**MOH**; **1**; 1	MOH; 2; 1	**VIR**; **1**; 1	VIR; 2; 1	VIR; 3; 1	**BAR**; **1**; 1	BAR; 2; 1	BAR; 3; 1	**SEB**; **1**; 6	SEB; 2; 1	SEB; 3; 1	**HMS**; **1**; 1	HMS; 2; 1	HMS; 3; 2	**COA**; **1**; 1	COA; 2; 1	COA; 3; 1	1st	401

==== Indy Lights ====
(key) (Races in bold indicate pole position) (Races in italics indicate fastest lap) (Races with ^{L} indicate a race lap led) (Races with * indicate most race laps led)

Year	Team	1	2	3	4	5	6	7	8	9	10	11	12	13	14	15	16	17	18	19	20	Rank	Points
2021	Global Racing Group w/ HMD Motorsports	**ALA**; **1**; 1	ALA; 2; 2	STP; 1; 9	STP; 2; 3	**IMS**; **1**; 1	IMS; 2; 5	DET; 1; 2	**DET**; **2**; 2	RDA; 1; 4	RDA; 2; 5	MOH; 1; 4	MOH; 2; 4	GTW; 1; 9	GTW; 2; 4	POR; 1; 3	POR; 2; 3	LAG; 1; 2	LAG; 2; 3	MOH; 1; 6	MOH; 2; 1	3rd	449
2022	HMD Motorsports w/ Dale Coyne Racing	STP; 3	**ALA**; 1^{L}*	**IMS**; **1**; 5^{L}	**IMS**; **2**; 1^{L}*	**DET**; **1**; 1^{L}*	**DET**; **2**; 1^{L}*	RDA; 4	MOH; 3	IOW; 4	**NSH**; 1^{L}*	**GTW**; 2^{L}*	POR; 3	LAG; 1; 6	LAG; 2; 4							1st	575

==== IndyCar Series ====
Year	Team	No.	Chassis	Engine	1	2	3	4	5	6	7	8	9	10	11	12	13	14	15	16	17	18	Rank	Points	Ref
2023	Meyer Shank Racing	60	Dallara DW12	Honda	STP	TXS	LBH	ALA	IMS	INDY	DET	ROA	MOH	TOR	IOW	IOW	NSH; 25	IMS; 12	GTW; 18	POR	LAG		31st	35	
2024	Chip Ganassi Racing	8	Dallara DW12	Honda	STP; 21	THE; 6	LBH; 13	ALA; 3	IMS; 24	INDY; 28	DET; 22	**ROA**; 12	LAG; 17	MOH; 15	IOW; 21	IOW; 12	TOR; 13	GTW; 3	POR; 23	MIL; 6	MIL; 20	NSH; 8	16th	279	

==== Indianapolis 500 ====
Year	Chassis	Engine	Start	Finish	Team
2024	Dallara	Honda	27	28	Chip Ganassi Racing

=== Complete IMSA SportsCar Championship results ===
(key) (Races in bold indicate pole position; results in italics indicate fastest lap)

Year	Team	Class	Make	Engine	1	2	3	4	5	6	7	8	9	10	11	12	Pos.	Points
2019	Precision Performance Motorsports	GTD	Lamborghini Huracán GT3 Evo	Lamborghini 5.2 L V10	DAY; 18	SEB	MOH	DET	WGL	MOS	LIM	ELK	VIR	LGA	PET		65th	13
2022	Alegra Motorsports	GTD	Mercedes-AMG GT3 Evo	Mercedes-AMG M159 6.2 L V8	DAY; 20	SEB	LBH	LGA	MOH	DET	WGL	MOS	LIM	ELK	VIR	PET	69th	135

Sporting positions
Preceded by Oliver Söderström (Formula Renault 1.6 Nordic)	Formula STCC Nordic; Champion; 2016	Succeeded by Hugo Nerman
Preceded by Oliver Söderström (Formula Renault 1.6 NEZ)	Formula STCC NEZ; Champion; 2016	Succeeded by Hugo Nerman
Preceded by Enaam Ahmed	BRDC British Formula 3 Championship; Champion; 2018	Succeeded by Clément Novalak
Preceded by Stuart Middleton	Sunoco Whelen Challenge; Winner; 2019	Succeeded by Johnathan Hoggard
Preceded by Dakota Dickerson (F3 Americas Championship)	Formula Regional Americas Championship; Champion; 2020	Succeeded by Kyffin Simpson
Preceded by Marcus Armstrong	IndyCar Series; Rookie of the Year; 2024	Succeeded by Louis Foster
