= 2016 Formula STCC Nordic season =

The 2016 Formula STCC Nordic season is the fourth season of the single seater championship that supports the Scandinavian Touring Car Championship. The series went previously under the name of Formula Renault 1.6 Nordic, but the name was changed after Renault Sport dropped its support for the 3.5 and 1.6 classes in late 2015. The season will begin on 30 April at Skövde Airport and will end on 24 September at Ring Knutstorp, after fourteen races held in seven venues. Most of these rounds are held in support of the 2016 Scandinavian Touring Car Championship, joint organiser of the series along with the FIA Northern European Zone Organisation.

The series uses all-carbon Signatech chassis and Michelin tyres.

== Drivers and teams ==
| Team | No | Drivers | Rounds |
|---|---|---|---|
| Ward WestCoast Junior Racing Team | 15 | (Denmark) Amalie Wichmand | All |
| Ward WestCoast Junior Racing Team | 30 | (Sweden) Philip Hall | All |
| Ward WestCoast Junior Racing Team | 69 | (Sweden) Hugo Nerman | All |
| Sundahl Racing | 27 | (Sweden) Edward Jonasson | All |
| LL Motorsport Junior Team | 41 | (Sweden) Emma Svensson | All |
| LL Motorsport Junior Team | 76 | (Sweden) Linus Lundqvist | All |
| Lyran Engineering | 44 | (Sweden) Rasmus Ericsson | 3–5, 7 |
| FinnDrive | 16 | (Finland) Konsta Lappalainen | 7 |
| FinnDrive | 50 | (Finland) Juuso Puhakka | All |
| Fredriksson Racing | 67 | (Sweden) Robin Fredriksson | All |

== Race calendar and results ==
Except for the sixth round, which will be held in Finland, all races will take place in Sweden. All Swedish rounds are held in support of the STCC championship.

Rounds denoted with a blue background will be a part of the Formula STCC NEZ Championship.

| Round | | Circuit | Date | Pole position | Fastest lap | Winning driver |
|---|---|---|---|---|---|---|
| 1 | R1 | (Sweden) Skövde Airport, Skövde | 1 May | (Finland) Juuso Puhakka | (Sweden) Linus Lundqvist | (Finland) Juuso Puhakka |
| 1 | R2 | (Sweden) Skövde Airport, Skövde | 1 May | (Finland) Juuso Puhakka | (Sweden) Robin Fredriksson | (Sweden) Linus Lundqvist |
| 2 | R1 | (Sweden) Mantorp Park, Mantorp | 26 May | (Sweden) Linus Lundqvist | (Sweden) Linus Lundqvist | (Sweden) Linus Lundqvist |
| 2 | R2 | (Sweden) Mantorp Park, Mantorp | 26 May | (Sweden) Linus Lundqvist | (Finland) Juuso Puhakka | (Finland) Juuso Puhakka |
| 3 | R1 | (Sweden) Anderstorp Raceway, Anderstorp | 19 June | (Sweden) Linus Lundqvist | (Sweden) Linus Lundqvist | (Sweden) Linus Lundqvist |
| 3 | R2 | (Sweden) Anderstorp Raceway, Anderstorp | 19 June | (Sweden) Linus Lundqvist | (Sweden) Linus Lundqvist | (Sweden) Linus Lundqvist |
| 4 | R1 | (Sweden) Falkenbergs Motorbana, Bergagård | 10 July | (Finland) Juuso Puhakka | (Sweden) Linus Lundqvist | (Sweden) Linus Lundqvist |
| 4 | R2 | (Sweden) Falkenbergs Motorbana, Bergagård | 10 July | (Finland) Juuso Puhakka | (Sweden) Linus Lundqvist | (Finland) Juuso Puhakka |
| 5 | R1 | (Sweden) Karlskoga Motorstadion, Karlskoga | 13 August | (Sweden) Linus Lundqvist | (Finland) Juuso Puhakka | (Sweden) Linus Lundqvist |
| 5 | R2 | (Sweden) Karlskoga Motorstadion, Karlskoga | 14 August | (Sweden) Linus Lundqvist | (Finland) Juuso Puhakka | (Sweden) Linus Lundqvist |
| 6 | R1 | (Finland) Alastaro Circuit, Alastaro | 27 August | (Finland) Juuso Puhakka | (Sweden) Linus Lundqvist | (Sweden) Philip Hall |
| 6 | R2 | (Finland) Alastaro Circuit, Alastaro | 27 August | (Finland) Juuso Puhakka | (Sweden) Linus Lundqvist | (Sweden) Linus Lundqvist |
| 7 | R1 | (Sweden) Ring Knutstorp, Kågeröd | 24 September | (Sweden) Linus Lundqvist | (Sweden) Linus Lundqvist | (Sweden) Linus Lundqvist |
| 7 | R2 | (Sweden) Ring Knutstorp, Kågeröd | 24 September | (Sweden) Linus Lundqvist | (Sweden) Linus Lundqvist | (Sweden) Linus Lundqvist |

== Championship standings ==
Points system

Points are awarded to the top 10 classified finishers. An extra point is awarded for pole position and fastest lap for each race.

| Position | **1st** | **2nd** | **3rd** | **4th** | **5th** | **6th** | **7th** | **8th** | **9th** | **10th** | **Pole** | **FL** |
| Points | 25 | 18 | 15 | 12 | 10 | 8 | 6 | 4 | 2 | 1 | 1 | 1 |

Parallel to the main championship, two other championships are held: the Formula STCC Junior Svenskt Mästerskap (JSM) for drivers under 26 years old holding a Swedish driver license, and the Formula STCC Northern European Zone (NEZ) championship at selected rounds. Points to these championships are awarded using the same system, with the sole exception of pole position and fastest lap not awarding points.

=== Formula STCC Drivers' Championship ===
| Pos | Driver | SKÖ | | MAN | | AND | | FAL | | KAR | | ALA | | KNU | | Pts |
|---|---|---|---|---|---|---|---|---|---|---|---|---|---|---|---|---|
| 1 | (Sweden) Linus Lundqvist | 2 | 1 | **1** | **EX** | **1** | **1** | 1 | 2 | **1** | **1** | 3 | 1 | **1** | **1** | 319 |
| 2 | (Finland) Juuso Puhakka | **1** | **Ret** | 2 | 1 | 2 | 2 | **Ret** | **1** | 2 | 7 | **6** | **6** | 2 | 2 | 214 |
| 3 | (Sweden) Philip Hall | Ret | 7 | 5 | 2 | 3 | 3 | 3 | 3 | 8 | 4 | 1 | 3 | 3 | 9 | 167 |
| 4 | (Sweden) Hugo Nerman | 4 | 2 | 3 | 4 | 4 | 4 | 7 | 4 | 3 | 2 | 5 | Ret | 5 | 5 | 162 |
| 5 | (Sweden) Robin Fredriksson | 3 | 4 | 4 | 3 | 5 | 7 | 2 | 5 | DNS | 3 | Ret | 2 | 4 | 4 | 156 |
| 6 | (Sweden) Edward Jonasson | 5 | 5 | 7 | 5 | 6 | 5 | 5 | 7 | 6 | 5 | 2 | 4 | 7 | 7 | 130 |
| 7 | (Sweden) Emma Svensson | 6 | 3 | 6 | 7 | 7 | 9 | 4 | 6 | 5 | 6 | Ret | 5 | 8 | 6 | 105 |
| 8 | (Denmark) Amalie Wichmand | 7 | 6 | 8 | 6 | 8 | 8 | 6 | Ret | 7 | 8 | 4 | Ret | EX | EX | 70 |
| 9 | (Sweden) Rasmus Ericsson | | | | | 9 | 6 | 8 | 8 | 4 | Ret | | | Ret | 3 | 45 |
| 10 | (Finland) Konsta Lappalainen | | | | | | | | | | | | | 6 | 8 | 12 |
| Pos | Driver | SKÖ | | MAN | | AND | | FAL | | KAR | | ALA | | KNU | | Pts |

| Colour | Result |
|---|---|
| Gold | Winner |
| Silver | Second place |
| Bronze | Third place |
| Green | Points classification |
| Blue | Non-points classification |
| Blue | Non-classified finish (NC) |
| Purple | Retired, not classified (Ret) |
| Red | Did not qualify (DNQ) |
| Red | Did not pre-qualify (DNPQ) |
| Black | Disqualified (DSQ) |
| White | Did not start (DNS) |
| White | Withdrew (WD) |
| White | Race cancelled (C) |
| Blank | Did not practice (DNP) |
| Blank | Did not arrive (DNA) |
| Blank | Excluded (EX) |

**Bold** – Pole
Italics – Fastest Lap

=== Formula STCC Junior Svenskt Mästerskap ===
| Pos | Driver | SKÖ | | MAN | | AND | | FAL | | KAR | | ALA | | KNU | | Pts |
|---|---|---|---|---|---|---|---|---|---|---|---|---|---|---|---|---|
| 1 | (Sweden) Linus Lundqvist | 2 | 1 | 1 | EX | 1 | 1 | 1 | 2 | 1 | 1 | 3 | 1 | 1 | 1 | 315 |
| 2 | (Sweden) Philip Hall | Ret | 7 | 5 | 2 | 3 | 3 | 3 | 3 | 8 | 4 | 1 | 3 | 3 | 9 | 198 |
| 3 | (Sweden) Hugo Nerman | 4 | 2 | 3 | 4 | 4 | 4 | 7 | 4 | 2 | 2 | 5 | Ret | 5 | 5 | 191 |
| 4 | (Sweden) Robin Fredriksson | 3 | 4 | 4 | 3 | 5 | 7 | 2 | 5 | DNS | 3 | Ret | 2 | 4 | 4 | 174 |
| 5 | (Sweden) Edward Jonasson | 5 | 5 | 7 | 5 | 6 | 5 | 5 | 7 | 6 | 5 | 2 | 4 | 7 | 7 | 148 |
| 6 | (Sweden) Emma Svensson | 6 | 3 | 6 | 7 | 7 | 9 | 4 | 6 | 5 | 6 | Ret | 5 | 8 | 6 | 127 |
| 7 | (Sweden) Rasmus Ericsson | | | | | 9 | 6 | 8 | 8 | 4 | Ret | | | Ret | 3 | 59 |
| Pos | Driver | SKÖ | | MAN | | AND | | FAL | | KAR | | ALA | | KNU | | Pts |

=== Formula STCC NEZ Championship ===
| Pos | Driver | AND | | ALA | | Pts |
|---|---|---|---|---|---|---|
| 1 | (Sweden) Linus Lundqvist | **1** | **1** | 3 | 1 | 90 |
| 2 | (Sweden) Philip Hall | 3 | 3 | 1 | 3 | 70 |
| 3 | (Finland) Juuso Puhakka | 2 | 2 | **6** | **6** | 52 |
| 4 | (Sweden) Edward Jonasson | 6 | 5 | 2 | 4 | 48 |
| 5 | (Sweden) Robin Fredriksson | 5 | 7 | Ret | 2 | 34 |
| 6 | (Sweden) Hugo Nerman | 4 | 4 | 5 | Ret | 34 |
| 7 | (Denmark) Amalie Wichmand | 8 | 8 | 4 | Ret | 20 |
| 8 | (Sweden) Emma Svensson | 7 | 9 | Ret | 5 | 18 |
| 9 | (Sweden) Rasmus Ericsson | 9 | 6 | | | 10 |
| Pos | Driver | AND | | ALA | | Pts |
