= 2022 Indy Lights =

Indy Lights season

2022 Indy Lights season
- Indy Lights

Season
- Races: 14
- Start date: February 27
- End date: September 11

Awards
- Drivers' champion: (Sweden) Linus Lundqvist
- Teams' champion: (United States) Andretti Autosport
- Rookie of the Year: (New Zealand) Hunter McElrea

The 2022 Indy Lights presented by Cooper Tires was the 36th season of the Indy Lights open wheel motor racing series and the 20th sanctioned by IndyCar, acting as the primary support series for the IndyCar Series. It was held over 14 races, consisting of two ovals and nine road and street courses. It was the last held under the "Indy Lights" branding.

Linus Lundqvist, driving for HMD Motorsports with Dale Coyne Racing, won the drivers' championship at the penultimate race of the season. Andretti Autosport won the teams' championship, while their driver Hunter McElrea became rookie of the year.

2022 was also the final season of Indy Lights utilizing Indy Lights moniker. From 2023 onwards the Indy Lights would be rebranded to Indy NXT.

== Series news ==
- On September 24, 2021, it was announced that Penske Entertainment, the owner of INDYCAR, would take over promotion of the series from Andersen Promotions, who remained responsible for the rest of the Road to Indy. The Goodyear Tire and Rubber Company would continue sponsoring the series, as Goodyear acquired Cooper Tire in 2021. Branding would remain as Cooper.
- On February 22, 2022, it was announced that as part of IndyCar taking over the role of the sanctioning body, Indy Lights would adjust its points structure to follow that of the IndyCar series.
- On June 22, 2022, it was announced that Firestone will become the sole tire supplier for Indy Lights starting in 2023, replacing Cooper Tires and returning to the series for the first time since 2013.

== Team and driver chart ==
The following drivers and teams competed in the series:

Team	No.	Drivers	Round(s)
Abel Motorsports	11	(Canada) Antonio Serravalle	1–2
Abel Motorsports	15	(United States) Flinn Lazier	12–14
Abel Motorsports	51	(United States) Jacob Abel	All
Abel Motorsports	61	(United States) Ryan Phinny	3–6
Andretti Autosport	2	(United States) Sting Ray Robb	All
Andretti Autosport	27	(New Zealand) Hunter McElrea	All
Andretti Autosport	28	(Denmark) Christian Rasmussen	All
Andretti Autosport	83	(Australia) Matthew Brabham	All
Force Indy	99	(United States) Ernie Francis Jr.	All
Global Racing Group with HMD Motorsports	24	(United States) Benjamin Pedersen	All
HMD Motorsports with Dale Coyne Racing	7	(United States) Christian Bogle	All
HMD Motorsports with Dale Coyne Racing	11	(Canada) Antonio Serravalle	3–9
HMD Motorsports with Dale Coyne Racing	11	(Republic of Ireland) James Roe	10–11
HMD Motorsports with Dale Coyne Racing	11	(United States) Nolan Siegel	13–14
HMD Motorsports with Dale Coyne Racing	21	(Cayman Islands) Kyffin Simpson	9–14
HMD Motorsports with Dale Coyne Racing	26	(Sweden) Linus Lundqvist	All
HMD Motorsports with Dale Coyne Racing	59	(Mexico) Manuel Sulaimán	1–2
HMD Motorsports with Dale Coyne Racing	68	(Singapore) Danial Frost	All
TJ Speed Motorsports	12	(Republic of Ireland) James Roe	1–9
TJ Speed Motorsports	21	(Cayman Islands) Kyffin Simpson	1–8

== Schedule ==
The provisional schedule was announced on January 11, 2022. Only three events of the schedule were double-header weekends, a significant change from 2021.

Rd.	Date	Race name	Track	Location
1	February 27	Indy Lights Grand Prix of St. Petersburg	R Streets of St. Petersburg	St. Petersburg, Florida
2	May 1	Indy Lights Grand Prix of Barber Motorsports Park	R Barber Motorsports Park	Birmingham, Alabama
3	May 13–14	Indy Lights Grand Prix of Indianapolis	R Indianapolis Motor Speedway road course	Speedway, Indiana
4	May 13–14	Indy Lights Grand Prix of Indianapolis	R Indianapolis Motor Speedway road course	Speedway, Indiana
5	June 4–5	Indy Lights Detroit Grand Prix	R The Raceway at Belle Isle Park	Detroit, Michigan
6	June 4–5	Indy Lights Detroit Grand Prix	R The Raceway at Belle Isle Park	Detroit, Michigan
7	June 12	Indy Lights Grand Prix at Road America	R Road America	Elkhart Lake, Wisconsin
8	July 3	Indy Lights at Mid-Ohio	R Mid-Ohio Sports Car Course	Lexington, Ohio
9	July 23	Indy Lights at Iowa Speedway	O Iowa Speedway	Newton, Iowa
10	August 7	Indy Lights Music City Grand Prix	R Nashville Street Circuit	Nashville, Tennessee
11	August 20	Indy Lights at World Wide Technology Raceway	O World Wide Technology Raceway	Madison, Illinois
12	September 4	Indy Lights Grand Prix of Portland	R Portland International Raceway	Portland, Oregon
13	September 10–11	Indy Lights Grand Prix of Monterey	R WeatherTech Raceway Laguna Seca	Monterey, California
14	September 10–11	Indy Lights Grand Prix of Monterey	R WeatherTech Raceway Laguna Seca	Monterey, California

== Race results ==
Round		Circuit	Pole position	Fastest lap	Most laps led	Race Winner	
Round		Circuit	Pole position	Fastest lap	Most laps led	Driver	Team
1		(United States) Streets of St. Petersburg	(New Zealand) Hunter McElrea	(Denmark) Christian Rasmussen	(Denmark) Christian Rasmussen	(Australia) Matthew Brabham	Andretti Autosport
2		(United States) Barber Motorsports Park	(Sweden) Linus Lundqvist	(Denmark) Christian Rasmussen	(Sweden) Linus Lundqvist	(Sweden) Linus Lundqvist	HMD Motorsports with Dale Coyne Racing
3	R1	(United States) Indianapolis Motor Speedway Road Course	(Sweden) Linus Lundqvist	(Sweden) Linus Lundqvist	(Singapore) Danial Frost	(Singapore) Danial Frost	HMD Motorsports with Dale Coyne Racing
4	R2	(United States) Indianapolis Motor Speedway Road Course	(Sweden) Linus Lundqvist	(Australia) Matthew Brabham	(Sweden) Linus Lundqvist	(Sweden) Linus Lundqvist	HMD Motorsports with Dale Coyne Racing
5	R1	(United States) Raceway on Belle Isle	(Sweden) Linus Lundqvist	(Sweden) Linus Lundqvist	(Sweden) Linus Lundqvist	(Sweden) Linus Lundqvist	HMD Motorsports with Dale Coyne Racing
6	R2	(United States) Raceway on Belle Isle	(Sweden) Linus Lundqvist	(Sweden) Linus Lundqvist	(Sweden) Linus Lundqvist	(Sweden) Linus Lundqvist	HMD Motorsports with Dale Coyne Racing
7		(United States) Road America	(United States) Sting Ray Robb	(United States) Sting Ray Robb	(Denmark) Christian Rasmussen	(Denmark) Christian Rasmussen	Andretti Autosport
8		(United States) Mid-Ohio Sports Car Course	(New Zealand) Hunter McElrea	(New Zealand) Hunter McElrea	(New Zealand) Hunter McElrea	(New Zealand) Hunter McElrea	Andretti Autosport
9		(United States) Iowa Speedway	(New Zealand) Hunter McElrea	(Australia) Matthew Brabham	(New Zealand) Hunter McElrea	(New Zealand) Hunter McElrea	Andretti Autosport
10		(United States) Nashville Street Circuit	(Sweden) Linus Lundqvist (Note: Qualifying was cancelled due to a thunderstorm warning, so the result was based on entrant standings.)	(United States) Sting Ray Robb	(Sweden) Linus Lundqvist	(Sweden) Linus Lundqvist	HMD Motorsports with Dale Coyne Racing
11		(United States) World Wide Technology Raceway	(Sweden) Linus Lundqvist	(United States) Benjamin Pedersen	(Sweden) Linus Lundqvist	(Australia) Matthew Brabham	Andretti Autosport
12		(United States) Portland International Raceway	(United States) Benjamin Pedersen	(Australia) Matthew Brabham	(United States) Benjamin Pedersen	(United States) Benjamin Pedersen	Global Racing Group with HMD Motorsports
13	R1	(United States) WeatherTech Raceway Laguna Seca	(United States) Sting Ray Robb	(United States) Sting Ray Robb	(United States) Sting Ray Robb	(United States) Sting Ray Robb	Andretti Autosport
14	R2	(United States) WeatherTech Raceway Laguna Seca	(Denmark) Christian Rasmussen	(United States) Sting Ray Robb	(Denmark) Christian Rasmussen	(Denmark) Christian Rasmussen	Andretti Autosport

== Season report ==
=== First half ===
The first event of the season was held in February on the Streets of St. Petersburg, and it began with Hunter McElrea scoring pole on his first Indy Lights weekend. He held the lead at the race start ahead of fellow rookie Christian Rasmussen, who rose to second at the first corner. Rasmussen gained the lead on lap 13, when McElrea crashed into the wall at turn 14. From there on, Rasmussen survived the restart as well as another caution and looked set to win on his debut, before he suddenly stopped on the penultimate lap because he ran out of fuel. This promoted Matthew Brabham into the lead, who then won the race after a six-year absence from the series. Benjamin Pedersen came second, ahead of Linus Lundqvist.

After a one-month break, Barber Motorsports Park in Alabama was next on the schedule, where HMD Motorsports locked out the front row courtesy of Lundqvist and Pedersen. The race was postponed and shortened because of thunderstorms, and began in wet conditions. Lundqvist used the superior visibility coming with his first grid spot to quickly pull out a gap to the field. By mid-race, the track was almost dry, so grip levels were decreasing. Many drivers made mistakes, span or ran off the track, with James Roe, Christian Bogle and McElrea all retiring. In the final stages of the race, Pedersen was increasing his pressure on leader Lundqvist, but did not manage to pass him and eventually finished only a tenth of a second behind in second place, ahead of Sting Ray Robb. The win also meant Lundqvist moved up into the championship lead.

The first double-header weekend came at the Indianapolis Motor Speedway road course. Lundqvist continued his form, claiming pole for both races despite suffering a puncture in his first qualifying run. He held the lead at the start of the first race, but was soon overtaken by Rasmussen, who started third and passed McElrea into turn one. When Lundqvist tried to regain first place, the pair collided. Both cars suffered damage, with Lundqvist having to pit. This warranted a caution and promoted McElrea to the lead, but he was passed by Danial Frost at the restart. Frost held his lead until the finish, leading home McElrea and Robb, with Rasmussen and Lundqvist managing to salvage fourth and fifth in the end. His fifth place also kept Lundqvist in the lead of the championship, albeit only six points ahead of Frost.

A day later, the second race was less straightforward. After a relatively quiet first half, where Lundqvist led unchallenged from pole and gapped Brabham, the race was stopped due to lightning in the area. When it resumed five hours later, it was rainy and the track was wet. While leader Lundqvist withstood the conditions, others were less fortunate: Brabham, Bogle, Roe, and Ernie Francis Jr. all made mistakes on the slippery track, prompting multiple caution periods. In the end, Ludqvist won ahead of Rasmussen and Robb, who was locked in a tight battle for third with Pedersen, Frost and McElrea for much of the second half of the race. Lundqvist's win helped him expand his championship lead over Frost, which now stood at 33 points.

Next up, Indy Lights visited the Streets of Belle Isle in Detroit. Qualifying offered the same picture as before, with Lundqvist again claiming double poles. The first race saw problems for multiple cars, with the first caution coming three laps in, when Jacob Abel and Rasmussen collided, the former ending up in the wall. The latter then also hit the wall later in the race, prompting a second full course yellow. Lundqvist was the class of the field, comfortably pulling away on the start as well as on both restarts. He led home Pedersen and Brabham, while Frost, Robb and McElrea all were multiple laps down on the field due to different technical issues or small crashes. Lundqvist now had a margin of 58 points over Pedersen, his nearest championship challenger.

On day two of the Detroit double-header, Lundqvist continued his domination. He once again led from the start and no one managed to put him under pressure for the duration of the race. Fighting broke out behind, where McElrea rose to second at the start and fought with Robb and Rasmussen before Bogle hit the wall and brought out a caution. On the restart, Lundqvist and McElrea broke away, so the fight continued for third place until Rasmussen crashed for the second time in two races. This promoted Robb to third, who pressured McElrea at the restart, but was not able to pass him. A second perfect race in as many days lifted Lundqvist up to 283 championship points, with a sizable cushion of 84 points to the rest of the field.

The first half of the season ended at Road America with Robb leading an Andretti 1-2-3-4 in qualifying. Right at the start, Rasmussen overtook the fighting pair of Robb and McElrea to move into the race lead, before two cautions came out in quick succession, for Francis Jr. and Antonio Serravalle. In a tumultuous restart, Bogle was launched over the kerbs approaching turn five and tore down the catchfencing with his car, prompting a red flag. When the race was restarted several hours later, it was a calmer affair: Rasmussen moved into first at the restart to win and lead home his teammates Robb and McElrea on an all-Andretti podium. Lundqvist came fourth, his championship lead now 82 points ahead of new second-placed man Robb.

=== Second half ===
The Mid-Ohio Sports Car Course hosted the start of the second half of the season, and McElrea claimed his second pole position. He started strong and left Lundqvist and Brabham to fight over second place, with Brabham eventually succeeding. Later in the race, the safety car was called when Roe spun and got stuck in the gravel. This brought McElrea back to the rest of the field, but he resisted Brabham's pressure and went on to claim his maiden victory. Lundqvist came third, after he seemed to have problems with his pace in the middle of the race, but he was able to keep Pedersen and the others behind. Because Robb was only fifth, Lundqvist gained further ground in the championship, with his lead now 87 points.

The first oval race of the season was next, at Iowa Speedway. McElrea once again started on pole, and led for the first half of the race, albeit under pressure from Lundqvist, who briefly got ahead twice by taking different lines into corners, but McElrea managed to stand his ground. This fighting allowed Robb and Brabham to close up to the leading duo, with the latter passing the former shortly before a caution came out when Roe hit the wall. On the restart, McElrea drifted wide, allowing second and third through. Brabham made his move for the lead with eight laps to go, the pair collided, Brabham sustained damage and dropped to fourth. Lundqvist crossed the line in first, but was handed a three-place penalty for the contact, promoting McElrea to the win ahead of Rasmussen, and Brabham to third. Lundqvist's championship lead sank to 77 points.

The next round was the Indy Lights series' debut around the Streets of Nashville. Pedersen set the pace in practice, but qualifying was cancelled when bad weather struck, so the field was formed by points order. This saw Lundqvist start at the front, where he handled early pressure from McElrea before the latter locked up and then fell back. Lundqvist opened a gap to the rest of the field, before Andretti teammates McElrea and Robb made contact when the former came through to take second. Battles up and down the field resulted in similar collisions, before Frost and Abel had bigger contact and Abel stopped on the road on the penultimate lap. This didn't hold up the leading trio, though, and Lundqvist took his fifth win of the season, growing his championship lead again, while McElrea took second place in the standings away from Robb.

It was back to oval racing then, as the next round was held on World Wide Technology Raceway. Lundqvist won qualifying and took pole, holding the lead at the start. Pedersen in second came straight under pressure by Brabham and Rasmussen, with the former soon overtaking him. This battle gave Lundqvist time to create a gap, which Brabham now set out to diminish. With five laps to go, Brabham had closed right up to Lundqvist's rear. The pair managed to avoid a repeat of the Iowa incident, Brabham cleanly overtook Lundqvist down the inside of turn three. Behind them, Rasmussen was comfortably in third before hitting the wall, limping back to the pits and retiring, promoting Pedersen to the podium. Brabham's win promoted him to second in the standings, but Lundqvist's lead now stood at its tallest, at 108 points.

Portland International Raceway welcomed teams and drivers for the penultimate destination of the year. Pedersen took his maiden pole in qualifying, and led the field to green. A caution was thrown early on when series debutant Flinn Lazier collided with Bogle and retired. After the restart, a fight for second place broke out between Frost, Rasmussen and Brabham. This eventually resulted in the first two making contact, which saw Frost hit the barriers head-on, causing another safety car. On the second restart, Pedersen quickly pulled away from Brabham and held his lead until the end to achieve his first Indy Lights victory. Lundqvist came third by virtue of avoiding risky fights, but Brabham's second place meant Lundqvist's championship lead of 103 points was barely not enough to decide the title there and then.

The championship finale was a double-header at WeatherTech Raceway Laguna Seca, and the weekend began with a double pole for Andretti, courtesy of Robb and Rasmussen. Lundqvist only needed to start the first race to secure his title, which he did in fifth place as Robb controlled the race from pole, gapping the field at the start and eventually finishing over ten seconds clear of the rest to take his maiden victory. Behind him, Rasmussen's race was a similarly quiet affair, as he also built a gap to McElrea in third, who had to defend against Abel in the latter stages of the race. The only other championship challenger, Brabham, was excluded from qualifying and had to start from the back. He managed to finish eighth in the end, while newly crowned champion Lundqvist was sixth. Robb's win lifted him to second in the standings.

A day later, the last race of the season started with Rasmussen on pole. He was similarly in control of the race as Robb the day before, but his gap to the field was smaller. Robb, who started in third, moved past champion Lundqvist early in the race and then kept the gap to Rasmussen at around a second all race, but was never close enough to start an attack. Brabham also overtook Lundqvist a lap after Robb, but could not keep up with the leading pair and finished in an untroubled third place. Robb's second place secured him second in the championship standings, as his nearest challenger McElrea had to start from the back and only climbed back up to eighth. This saw Brabham clinch third in the standings in his return to Indy Lights. Lundqvist's lead at the end of the season stood at 92 points.

== Championship standings ==
=== Drivers' Championship ===
Scoring system

Position	**1st**	**2nd**	**3rd**	**4th**	**5th**	**6th**	**7th**	**8th**	**9th**	**10th**	**11th**	**12th**	**13th**	**14th**	**15th**	**16th**	**17th**	**18th**	**19th**	**20th**
Points	50	40	35	32	30	28	26	24	22	20	19	18	17	16	15	14	13	12	11	10

- The driver who qualified on pole is awarded one additional point.
- Every driver who led at least one lap got awarded a bonus point, the driver who led the most laps got two points

Pos	Driver	STP	ALA	IMS		DET		ROA	MOH	IOW	NSH	GAT	POR	LAG		Points
1	(Sweden) Linus Lundqvist	3	**1**^{L}*	**5**^{L}	**1**^{L}*	**1**^{L}*	**1**^{L}*	4	3	4^{L}	**1**^{1L}*	**2**^{L}*	3	6	4	575
2	(United States) Sting Ray Robb	4	3	3	3	11	3	**2**^{L}	5	5	2	6	6	**1**^{L}*	2	483
3	(Australia) Matthew Brabham	1^{L}	7	10	9	3	4	6	2	3	4	1^{L}	2	8	3	471
4	(New Zealand) Hunter McElrea RY	**14**^{L}	12	2^{L}	6	12	2	3	**1**^{L}*	**1**^{L}*	3	5	5	3	8	460
5	(United States) Benjamin Pedersen	2	2	11	4	2	6	11	6	9	6	3	**1**^{L}*	5	6	443
6	(Denmark) Christian Rasmussen R	12^{L}*	11	4^{L}	2	13	13	1^{L}*	4	2	5	12	7	2	**1**^{L}*	440
7	(Singapore) Danial Frost	5	4	1^{L}*	7	10	5	8	13	7	10	4	10	7	7	382
8	(United States) Jacob Abel R	10	6	8	5	14	12	5	11	6	9	7	4	4	5	355
9	(Cayman Islands) Kyffin Simpson R	11	5	12	8	5	7	9	9	11	8	10	9	12	12	312
10	(United States) Ernie Francis Jr. R	7	8	9	10	9	10	10	10	8	11	9	8	11	13	299
11	(United States) Christian Bogle	9	14	7	14	4	14	12	7	10	7	11	11	9	10	298
12	(Republic of Ireland) James Roe R	13	13	13	13	7	9	7	12	13	12	8				219
13	(Canada) Antonio Serravalle	8	9	6	11	6	8	13	8	12						204
14	(United States) Ryan Phinny			14	12	8	11									77
15	(United States) Flinn Lazier R												12	13	11	54
16	(Mexico) Manuel Sulaimán	6	10													48
17	(United States) Nolan Siegel R													10	9	42
Pos	Driver	STP	ALA	IMS		DET		ROA	MOH	IOW	NSH	GAT	POR	LAG		Points

Color	Result
Gold	Winner
Silver	2nd place
Bronze	3rd place
Green	4th & 5th place
Light Blue	6th–10th place
Dark Blue	Finished (Outside Top 10)
Purple	Did not finish
Red	Did not qualify (DNQ)
Brown	Withdrawn (Wth)
Black	Disqualified (DSQ)
White	Did not start (DNS)
Blank	Did not participate (DNP)
Blank	Not competing

**In-line notation**
**Bold**	Pole position (1 point)
Italics	Ran fastest race lap
^{L}	Led a race lap (1 point)
*	Led most race laps (2 points)
^{1}	Qualifying cancelled no bonus point awarded
R	Rookie
RY	Rookie of the Year

- Ties in points broken by number of wins, or best finishes.

=== Teams' championship ===
Scoring system

Position	**1st**	**2nd**	**3rd**	**4th**	**5th**	**6th**	**7th**	**8th**	**9th**	**10th+**
Points	22	18	15	12	10	8	6	4	2	1

- Single car teams received 3 bonus points as an equivalency to multi-car teams
- Only the best two results counted for teams fielding more than two entries

Pos	Team	STP	ALA	IMS		DET		ROA	MOH	IOW	NSH	GAT	POR	LAG		Points
1	Andretti Autosport	1	3	2	2	3	2	1	1	1	2	1	2	1	1	454
1	Andretti Autosport	4	7	3	3	9	3	2	2	2	3	5	5	2	2	454
2	HMD Motorsports with Dale Coyne Racing	3	1	1	1	1	1	3	3	3	1	2	3	5	3	406
2	HMD Motorsports with Dale Coyne Racing	5	4	4	6	4	4	6	5	5	5	4	7	6	6	406
3	Global Racing Group with HMD Motorsports	2	2	7	4	2	5	9	4	7	4	3	1	4	5	237
4	Abel Motorsports	7	6	5	5	7	9	4	8	4	6	6	4	3	4	163
4	Abel Motorsports	8	9	10	9	10	10						8	8	7	163
5	Force Indy	6	8	6	8	8	8	8	7	6	7	7	6	7	8	119
6	TJ Speed Motorsports	9	5	8	7	5	6	5	6	8						92
6	TJ Speed Motorsports	10	10	9	10	6	7	7	9							92
Pos	Team	STP	ALA	IMS		DET		ROA	MOH	IOW	NSH	GAT	POR	LAG		Points

== See also ==
- 2022 IndyCar Series
- 2022 Indy Pro 2000 Championship
- 2022 U.S. F2000 National Championship
- 2022 USF Juniors
