= Flinn Lazier =

American racing driver (born 1999)

- Born: April 7, 1999 (age 27)
- Relatives: Buddy Lazier (father); Bob Lazier (grandfather); Jaques Lazier (uncle)

Flinn Lazier (born 4 April 1999 in Vail, Colorado) is an American racing driver. Lazier has raced in Formula Vee, Formula Enterprise, Formula Atlantic, Formula 4, and USF2000. Lazier was also a competitive skier with the Ski & Snowboard Club Vail.

== Auto racing career ==
Lazier was born into a family with a rich auto racing history. Flinn's father, Buddy Lazier, won the 1996 Indianapolis 500, 2000 IRL Championship, and several more professional races. Bob Lazier (Flinn's grandfather) was the 1981 Indianapolis 500 rookie of the year and won the SCCA National Championship Runoffs in Formula B in 1971. Lastly, Jaques Lazier is Flinn's uncle. Jaques had won a single IndyCar Series race in 2001 and also won the SCCA National Championship Runoffs in Formula Vee in 1996.

Lazier made his road racing debut in 2015 in the Colorado Region SCCA Formula Vee class. Debuting near the end of the season, Lazier won all four races he competed at High Plains Raceway. Lazier won the divisional Formula Vee championship in 2016. In 2016, Lazier made his SCCA National Championship Runoffs debut at the Mid-Ohio Sports Car Course. Lazier finished second, after starting third, in the 39-car field.

Lazier started the 2017 season in the SCCA regional Formula Enterprises series. At Barber Motorsports Park Lazier made his debut in the Mazda Road to Indy. He joined Newman Wachs Racing in the U.S. F2000 National Championship for the second round of the 2017 season at Barber Motorsports Park, making his professional debut.

== Ski competition ==
Lazier's grandfather Bob built the Tivoli Lodge, a luxury hotel near the Vail Ski Resort. Bob, Buddy and Jaques were avid skiers. Flinn was also a competitive skier. Lazier competed in four International Ski Federation sanctioned events. At Copper Mountain, Lazier raced in the Super-G and Super Giant Slalom competitions in 2015.

== Racing record ==
=== Career summary ===
Season	Series	Team	Races	Wins	Poles	F/Laps	Podiums	Points	Position
2017	Formula 4 United States Championship	Group A Racing	3	0	0	0	0	18	21st
2017	U.S. F2000 National Championship	Newman Wachs Racing	2	0	0	0	0	10	33rd
2019	Atlantic Championship	K-Hill Motorsports	8	1	2	2	4	177	6th
2020	Trans-Am Series - TA2		1	0	0	0	0	8	47th
2021	Indy Pro 2000 Championship	Legacy Autosport	4	0	0	0	0	37	16th
2022	Atlantic Championship - 016 Class		4	4	2	3	4	212	2nd
2022	Indy Lights	Abel Motorsports	3	0	0	0	0	54	15th

=== SCCA National Championship Runoffs ===
Year	Track	Car	Engine	Class	Finish	Start	Status
2016	Mid-Ohio	Vortech	Volkswagen	Formula Vee	2	3	Running
2017	Indianapolis	Van Diemen DP06	Mazda	Formula Enterprises	33	2	Retired
2018	Sonoma	Van Diemen DP06	Mazda	Formula Enterprises 2	1	1	Running
2019	VIR	Swift 016.a	Mazda	Formula Atlantic	1	3	Running
2020	Road America	Swift 014a	Mazda	Formula Atlantic	DNF	3	Retired

=== U.S. F2000 National Championship results ===
Year	Team	1	2	3	4	5	6	7	8	9	10	11	12	13	14	Rank	Points
2017	Newman Wachs Racing	STP	STP	BAR; 22	BAR; 12	IMS	IMS	ROA	ROA	IOW	TOR	TOR	MOH	MOH	WGL	33rd	10

=== Indy Pro 2000 Championship results ===
Year	Team	1	2	3	4	5	6	7	8	9	10	11	12	13	14	15	16	17	18	Rank	Points
2021	Legacy Autosport	ALA; 9	ALA; 16	STP; 11	STP; 11	IMS	IMS	IMS	LOR	ROA	ROA	MOH	MOH	GMP	NJM	NJM	NJM	MOH	MOH	16th	37

==== Indy Lights ====
Year	Team	1	2	3	4	5	6	7	8	9	10	11	12	13	14	Rank	Points
2022	Abel Motorsports	STP	ALA	IMS	IMS	DET	DET	RDA	MOH	IOW	NSH	GTW	POR; 12	LAG; 13	LAG; 11	15th	54
