= 2019 Atlantic Championship =

2019 Atlantic Championship Series season

Season
- Races: 8
- Start date: April 18
- End date: August 4

Awards
- Drivers' champion: Dario Cangialosi

The 2019 Atlantic Championship Series season was the sixth season of the revived Atlantic Championship. The series was organized by Formula Race Promotions and sanctioning returned to SCCA Pro Racing after two years with USAC. Dario Cangialosi won the short four round, 8 race, championship by 82 points over Keith Grant. Cangialosi won three races to Grant's four. Flinn Lazier won a single race.

== Race calendar and results ==
Round	Circuit	Location	Date	Pole position	Fastest lap	Winning driver
1	(Georgia (U.S. state)) Road Atlanta	(United States) Braselton, Georgia	April 20		(United States) Flinn Lazier	(United States) Dario Cangialosi
2	(Georgia (U.S. state)) Road Atlanta	(United States) Braselton, Georgia	April 20		(United States) Keith Grant	(United States) Dario Cangialosi
3	(New York (state)) Watkins Glen International	(United States) Watkins Glen, New York	May 11	(United States) Dario Cangialosi	(United States) Flinn Lazier	(United States) Flinn Lazier
4	(New York (state)) Watkins Glen International	(United States) Watkins Glen, New York	May 12	(United States) Flinn Lazier	(United States) Dario Cangialosi	(United States) Dario Cangialosi
5	Virginia International Raceway	(United States) Alton, Virginia	June 27	(United States) Dario Cangialosi	(United States) Keith Grant	(United States) Keith Grant
6	Virginia International Raceway	(United States) Alton, Virginia	June 28	(United States) Dario Cangialosi	(United States) Keith Grant	(United States) Keith Grant
7	(Pennsylvania) Pittsburgh International Race Complex	(United States) Wampum, Pennsylvania	August 3	(United States) Dario Cangialosi	(United States) Keith Grant	(United States) Keith Grant
8	(Pennsylvania) Pittsburgh International Race Complex	(United States) Wampum, Pennsylvania	August 4	(United States) Keith Grant	(United States) Keith Grant	(United States) Keith Grant
