= HMD Motorsports =

American racing team

(United States) HMD Motorsports
- Founded: 2019
- Founder(s): Henry Malukas; Daiva Malukas
- Base: Brownsburg, Indiana
- Team principal(s): Henry Malukas
- Current series: Indy NXT
- Former series: Formula Regional Americas Championship; IndyCar Series
- Current drivers: 17. (Mexico) Salvador de Alba; 45. (Australia) Jack Beeton; 67. (Brazil) Enzo Fittipaldi; 71. (Poland) Tymek Kucharczyk
- Noted drivers: (United States) David Malukas (United States) Bryce Aron (United States) Nikita Johnson (Denmark) Christian Rasmussen (United States) Davey Hamilton Jr. (United States) Juan Manuel Correa (Germany) Sophia Flörsch (United States) Myles Rowe (Sweden) Linus Lundqvist (New Zealand) Liam Sceats (Netherlands) Niels Koolen (United States) Max Taylor (Brazil) Nicholas Monteiro (Republic of Ireland) James Roe (Brazil) Caio Collet (New Zealand) Callum Hedge (United Kingdom) Toby Sowery (United States) Josh Pierson (United States) Hailie Deegan (Republic of Ireland) Jonathan Browne (United States) Benjamin Pedersen (Cayman Islands) Kyffin Simpson (United States) Nolan Siegel (Singapore) Danial Frost
- Teams' Championships: Indy NXT; 2023: HMD Motorsports with Dale Coyne Racing
- Drivers' Championships: Indy Lights; 2022: Linus Lundqvist; Indy NXT; 2023: Christian Rasmussen; 2023 Rookie of the Year: Nolan Siegel; 2024 Rookie of the Year: Caio Collet
- First entry: 2019 Illinois 250k
- Last entry: 2026 Indy NXT at World Wide Technology Raceway
- First win: 2019 Grand Prix of Portland Race 2
- Last win: 2026 Detroit Grand Prix

HMD Motorsports is an American racing team which is currently competing the Indy NXT series, running 4 cars. The team is owned by Henry Malukas.

== Indy Lights / Indy NXT (2019–present) ==
=== 2019 ===
HMD Motorsports (BN Racing) entered the 2019 Indy Lights series. David Malukas ran for the team in 2019 with a limited budget. Toby Sowery won the Sunday race at Portland for HMD Motorsports/Team Pelfrey. HMD was to run the 2020 Indy Lights series, but the season was cancelled due to COVID-19.

=== 2021 ===
HMD Motorsports, together with Global Racing Group fielded four cars to start the 2021 Indy Lights series season. Drivers included Benjamin Pedersen, Linus Lundqvist, Nikita Lastochkin, and David Malukas. Exclusive Autosport, due to delaying its planned Indy Lights entry, sold their two cars to HMD/GRG. Linus Lundqvist won Race 1 from pole at the Indy Lights Grand Prix of Alabama with teammate David Malukas winning Race 2 from pole. Malukas won Race 2 from pole at the Indy Lights Grand Prix of St. Petersburg. Lundqvist won the Indy Lights Grand Prix of Indianapolis Race 1 from pole with teammate Malukas winning Race 2 from pole. Malukas won Race 2 at Road America, both races at Gateway, and Portland Race 1. Lundqvist would use another car at Gateway due to a crash before the races. Manuel Sulaimán joined the team at Portland, replacing Lastochkin. Lundqvist won the season finale at Mid-Ohio.

=== 2022 ===
HMD partnered with Dale Coyne Racing for the 2022 Indy Lights series season. Drivers included Christian Bogle, Danial Frost, Linus Lundqvist, and Manuel Sulaimán. The teams partnership continued with Global Racing Group, fielding driver Benjamin Pedersen. Lundqvist won several races throughout the season, while teammate Frost won at the Indy Lights Grand Prix of Indianapolis Race 1. Sulaimán would leave the team and be replaced by Antonio Serravalle starting at Indianapolis. Kyffin Simpson would join the team starting at Iowa, moving over from TJ Speed. Serravalle would leave and be replaced by James Roe starting at Nashville, who also moved over from TJ Speed. Pedersen would win at Portland. Nolan Siegel joined the team for the season finale at Laguna Seca Lundqvist would win the series championship at Race 1 of Laguna Seca.

=== 2023 ===
HMD Motorsports fielded an entry for Force Indy driver Ernie Francis Jr. HMD also took over the teams equipment and personal. The team started 2023 with nine cars in the Indy NXT field. Christian Rasmussen won the championship racing for HMD. Rasmussen almost ran out of funding three times during the season.

=== 2024 ===
Myles Rowe joined Force Indy/HMD for 2024. HMD started 2024 with ten cars in the Indy NXT field. Nolan Siegel did not race at Road America due to being needed by IndyCar Series team Juncos Hollinger Racing as a replacement driver, with Kiko Porto taking his place for the weekend. Siegel then left the team to compete in the 2024 IndyCar Series for Arrow McLaren. Caio Collet won in his rookie season at Mid-Ohio, and later would be series rookie of the year. Christian Brooks joined the team starting at Laguna Seca. Nolan Allaer ended his season in July to focus on 2025.

=== 2025 ===
HMD formed a partnership with USF Pro 2000 based team TJ Speed. Hailie Deegan joined HMD for 2025. HMD started 2025 with nine cars in the Indy NXT field. Sophia Floersch would leave HMD after one race due to sponsorship issues. Evagoras Papasavvas, a late addition to HMD for Barber, and in his first NXT race finished second. Juan Manuel Correa joined the team starting at Indianapolis, and would finish third at Detroit in his second start for the team. Caio Collet would win at Road America and both Laguna Seca races.

=== 2026 ===
Due to Indy NXT rule changes, HMD can only field four cars in 2026. HMD formed a technical alliance with Cusick Motorsports and strategic alliance with A. J. Foyt Racing, helping each team field two cars.

== IndyCar (2022-23, 2026) ==
=== 2022-23 ===
HMD Motorsports partnered with Dale Coyne Racing to run David Malukas in the 2022 and 2023 IndyCar Series. The partnership would end after 2023.

=== 2026 ===
In April 2026, it was announced that HMD Motorsports would partner with A.J. Foyt Racing to field Katherine Legge in the 2026 Indianapolis 500.

== Formula Regional Americas Championship (2020) ==
=== 2020 ===
HMD Motorsports entered the 2020 Formula Regional Americas Championship series with drivers David Malukas and Santiago Urrutia after the cancellation of the 2020 Indy Lights series. Logan Cusson joined the team starting at Barber Motorsports Park. Kyffin Simpson joined the team starting at Sebring International Raceway. David Malukas would win the Saturday race at Sebring. Marco Kacic joined the team for Circuit of the Americas.

== Formula Regional Oceania Trophy (2026) ==
=== 2026 ===
In July 2025, HMD Motorsports and USF Pro 200 team TJ Speed Motorsports announced they had joined forces to field three entries in the 2026 season of the Formula Regional Oceania Trophy. The three entries will compete as HMD Motorsports with TJ Speed.

== IMSA ==
In September 2025, HMD Motorsports announced a partnership with Intersport Racing to field an Oreca 07 LMP2 car in the IMSA SportsCar Championship. The car was planned to be fielded under the Intersport Racing name and it would have been based at HMD Motorsport's facility in Brownsburg. Intersport instead would run the program in-house, only renting facilities from HMD.

== Current series results ==
=== Indy Lights / Indy NXT ===
Year	Car	Drivers	Races	Wins	Poles	F/Laps	Podiums	Points	D.C.	T.C.
2019	Dallara IL-15	(United Kingdom) Toby Sowery	18	1	0	1	7	367	3rd	3rd
2019	Dallara IL-15	(United States) David Malukas	18	0	0	0	2	301	6th	3rd
2021	Dallara IL-15	(United States) David Malukas	20	7	6	4	16	524	2nd	1st
2021	Dallara IL-15	(Sweden) Linus Lundqvist	20	3	3	2	11	449	3rd	1st
2021	Dallara IL-15	(United States) Benjamin Pedersen	20	0	0	1	6	356	4th	1st
2021	Dallara IL-15	(Russia) Nikita Lastochkin	12	0	0	0	0	123	13th	1st
2021	Dallara IL-15	(Mexico) Manuel Sulaimán	6	0	0	0	0	75	15th	1st
2022	Dallara IL-15	(Sweden) Linus Lundqvist	14	5	7	3	9	575	1st	2nd
2022	Dallara IL-15	(Singapore) Danial Frost	14	1	0	0	1	382	7th	2nd
2022	Dallara IL-15	(Barbados) Kyffin Simpson†	14	0	0	0	0	312	9th	2nd
2022	Dallara IL-15	(United States) Christian Bogle	14	0	0	0	0	298	11th	2nd
2022	Dallara IL-15	(Republic of Ireland) James Roe Jr.†	11	0	0	0	0	219	12th	2nd
2022	Dallara IL-15	(Canada) Antonio Serravalle†	9	0	0	0	0	204	13th	2nd
2022	Dallara IL-15	(Mexico) Manuel Sulaimán	2	0	0	0	0	48	16th	2nd
2022	Dallara IL-15	(United States) Nolan Siegel	2	0	0	0	0	42	17th	2nd
2022	Dallara IL-15	(United States) Benjamin Pedersen	14	1	1	1	5	444	5th	3rd
2023	Dallara IL-15	(Denmark) Christian Rasmussen	14	5	5	5	8	539	1st	1st
2023	Dallara IL-15	(United States) Nolan Siegel	14	2	0	2	5	415	3rd	1st
2023	Dallara IL-15	(Singapore) Danial Frost	14	1	0	0	3	361	6th	1st
2023	Dallara IL-15	(United States) Reece Gold†	14	1	0	0	2	334	8th	1st
2023	Dallara IL-15	(United States) Christian Bogle	14	0	0	0	0	266	11th	1st
2023	Dallara IL-15	(Sweden) Rasmus Lindh†	10	0	0	0	1	210	14th	1st
2023	Dallara IL-15	(United States) Josh Green	6	0	0	0	0	119	20th	1st
2023	Dallara IL-15	(Cayman Islands) Kyffin Simpson	13	0	1	0	2	283	10th	5th
2023	Dallara IL-15	(United States) Josh Pierson	9	0	0	0	0	173	15th	5th
2023	Dallara IL-15	(United Kingdom) Toby Sowery	3	0	0	0	1	65	23rd	5th
2023	Dallara IL-15	(United States) Ernie Francis Jr.	13	0	0	0	1	300	9th	6th
2024	Dallara IL-15	(Brazil) Caio Collet	14	1	1	3	6	436	3rd	2nd
2024	Dallara IL-15	(New Zealand) Callum Hedge	14	0	0	0	1	332	4th	2nd
2024	Dallara IL-15	(United States) Reece Gold	13	0	0	1	0	289	10th	2nd
2024	Dallara IL-15	(United States) Christian Bogle	14	0	0	0	0	284	12th	2nd
2024	Dallara IL-15	(Republic of Ireland) Jonathan Browne	14	0	0	0	0	279	13th	2nd
2024	Dallara IL-15	(United States) Josh Pierson	14	0	0	0	0	264	14th	2nd
2024	Dallara IL-15	(United States) Christian Brooks	8	0	0	0	0	208	16th	2nd
2024	Dallara IL-15	(United States) Nolan Siegel	5	1	1	0	3	177	17th	2nd
2024	Dallara IL-15	(United States) Nolan Allaer	10	0	0	0	0	158	19th	2nd
2024	Dallara IL-15	(Netherlands) Niels Koolen	9	0	0	0	0	140	20th	2nd
2024	Dallara IL-15	(Brazil) Kiko Porto	1	0	0	0	0	18	26th	2nd
2024	Dallara IL-15	(United States) Jagger Jones	1	0	0	0	0	17	27th	2nd
2024	Dallara IL-15	(United States) Myles Rowe	14	0	0	0	0	286	11th	5th
2025	Dallara IL-15	(Brazil) Caio Collet	14	3	3	4	9	527	2nd	N/A
2025	Dallara IL-15	(United States) Josh Pierson	14	0	0	1	2	378	6th	N/A
2025	Dallara IL-15	(United States) Bryce Aron†	14	0	0	0	0	260	11th	N/A
2025	Dallara IL-15	(United States) Hailie Deegan	14	0	0	0	0	202	14th	N/A
2025	Dallara IL-15	(Australia) Tommy Smith	14	0	0	0	0	202	15th	N/A
2025	Dallara IL-15	(United States) Nolan Allaer	13	0	0	0	0	192	16th	N/A
2025	Dallara IL-15	(Ecuador) Juan Manuel Correa	9	0	0	0	1	176	17th	N/A
2025	Dallara IL-15	(New Zealand) Liam Sceats	8	0	0	0	0	162	18th	N/A
2025	Dallara IL-15	(United States) Max Taylor	6	0	0	0	0	123	20th	N/A
2025	Dallara IL-15	(United States) Evagoras Papasavvas	5	0	0	0	1	117	21st	N/A
2025	Dallara IL-15	(United States) Davey Hamilton Jr.	4	0	0	0	0	59	23rd	N/A
2025	Dallara IL-15	(United States) Nikita Johnson	3	0	0	0	0	55	24th	N/A
2025	Dallara IL-15	(Germany) Sophia Flörsch	1	0	0	0	0	18	26th	N/A
2026	Dallara IL-15	(Brazil) Enzo Fittipaldi	17	4	2	4	7	556	2nd	N/A
2026	Dallara IL-15	(Poland) Tymek Kucharczyk	17	2	1	2	8	551	3rd	N/A
2026	Dallara IL-15	(Australia) Jack Beeton	17	0	0	1	3	382	9th	N/A
2026	Dallara IL-15	(Mexico) Salvador de Alba	14	0	0	0	0	245	16th	N/A
2026	Dallara IL-15	(United Kingdom) Bart Harrison	3	0	0	0	0	51	27th	N/A

† Shared results with other teams.

=== Formula Regional Oceania Trophy ===
Year	Car	Drivers	Races	Wins	Poles	F/Laps	Podiums	Points	D.C.	T.C.
2026	Tatuus FT-60-Toyota	(Australia) James Wharton	11	1	0	1	2	167	8th	4th
2026	Tatuus FT-60-Toyota	(Brazil) Ricardo Baptista	15	0	0	0	0	86	18th	4th
2026	Tatuus FT-60-Toyota	(United States) Trevor LaTourrette	15	0	0	0	0	55	19th	4th
2026	Tatuus FT-60-Toyota	(New Zealand) Liam Sceats	3	0	0	0	1	52	20th	4th

== Former series results ==
=== Formula Regional Americas Championship ===
Year	Car	Drivers	Races	Wins	Poles	F/Laps	Podiums	Points	D.C.	T.C.
2020	Ligier JS F3	(United States) David Malukas	17	2	0	1	15	283	2nd	2nd
2020	Ligier JS F3	(Canada) Logan Cusson†	16	0	0	0	1	64	8th	2nd
2020	Ligier JS F3	(Cayman Islands) Kyffin Simpson	9	0	0	0	0	30	13th	2nd
2020	Ligier JS F3	(Uruguay) Santiago Urrutia	2	0	0	0	1	15	15th	2nd
2020	Ligier JS F3	(Canada) Marco Kacic	3	0	0	0	0	1	19th	2nd

† Shared results with other teams.

=== IndyCar Series ===
Year	Car	Drivers	Races	Wins	Poles	F/Laps	Podiums	Points	D.C.
2022	Dallara DW12	(United States) David Malukas	17	0	0	2	1	305	16th
2023	Dallara DW12	(United States) David Malukas	17	0	0	1	1	265	17th

== Timeline ==
Current series
Indy NXT	2019–present
Formula Regional Oceania Trophy	2026–present
Former series
Formula Regional Americas Championship	2020
IndyCar Series	2022–2023
