= 2015 Formula Renault 1.6 Nordic season =

The 2015 Formula Renault 1.6 Nordic season was the third season of the Formula Renault 1.6 Nordic, a series running 1600cc Formula Renault machinery in similar fashion to the French F4 Championship, and the last one to run under the backing of Renault. The series began on 9 May at Skövde Airport and ended on 26 September at Ring Knutstorp, after fifteen races held in seven venues. Most of these rounds were held in support of the 2015 Scandinavian Touring Car Championship season, joint organiser of the series along with the FIA Northern European Zone Organisation.

The series uses all-carbon Signatech chassis, 1.6-litre 140bhp Renault K4MRS engines, and Michelin tyres.

== Drivers and teams ==
Team	No.	Drivers	Rounds
PWR Junior Team	2	(New Zealand) Paul Blomqvist	1
PWR Junior Team	4	(Sweden) Oliver Söderström	All
PWR Racing Team	22	(Sweden) Julia Holgersson	2–7
Team TIDÖ	3	(Sweden) Linus Lundqvist	All
Captain Racing	5	(Germany) Nicholas Otto	4
Lunna Racing	7	(Sweden) Daniel Johansson	4–7
FinnDrive	8	(Finland) Ilmari Korpivaara	All
FinnDrive	50	(Finland) Juuso Puhakka	All
MPS Motorsport	9	(Sweden) Reuben Kressner	2, 4, 6
BR Motorsport	23	(Sweden) Otto Tjäder	1
Trojnar Racing	27	(Sweden) Edward Jonasson	All
Lyran Engineering	44	(Sweden) Rasmus Ericsson	2, 4, 7
Svensson Racing	47	(Sweden) Robert Svensson	1–2, 4–7
Fredriksson Racing	67	(Sweden) Robin Fredriksson	All
Dutt Motorsport	77	(Germany) Laurents Hörr	1–2, 4

== Race calendar and results ==
Except for the third round, which was held in Finland, all races took place in Sweden. All Swedish rounds, with the exception of the one at the Kinnekulle Ring, were held in support of the STCC championship.

Rounds denoted with a blue background were a part of the Formula Renault 1.6 NEZ Championship.

Round		Circuit	Date	Pole position	Fastest lap	Winning driver
1	R1	Skövde Airport, Skövde	9 May	(Sweden) Oliver Söderström	(Germany) Laurents Hörr	(Sweden) Oliver Söderström
1	R2	Skövde Airport, Skövde	9 May	(Finland) Ilmari Korpivaara	(Sweden) Linus Lundqvist	(Sweden) Oliver Söderström
2	R1	Anderstorp Raceway, Anderstorp	30 May	(Germany) Laurents Hörr	(Sweden) Robert Svensson	(Finland) Ilmari Korpivaara
2	R2	Anderstorp Raceway, Anderstorp	31 May	(Sweden) Oliver Söderström	(Sweden) Oliver Söderström	(Sweden) Oliver Söderström
2	R3	Anderstorp Raceway, Anderstorp	31 May	(Sweden) Oliver Söderström	(Sweden) Linus Lundqvist	(Germany) Laurents Hörr
3	R1	Ahvenisto Race Circuit, Hämeenlinna	6 June	(Finland) Ilmari Korpivaara	(Finland) Ilmari Korpivaara	(Finland) Ilmari Korpivaara
3	R2	Ahvenisto Race Circuit, Hämeenlinna	6 June	(Finland) Ilmari Korpivaara	(Sweden) Oliver Söderström	(Sweden) Oliver Söderström
4	R1	Falkenbergs Motorbana, Bergagård	11 July	(Finland) Ilmari Korpivaara	(Finland) Ilmari Korpivaara	(Finland) Ilmari Korpivaara
4	R2	Falkenbergs Motorbana, Bergagård	12 July	(Finland) Ilmari Korpivaara	(Sweden) Linus Lundqvist	(Sweden) Robert Svensson
4	R3	Falkenbergs Motorbana, Bergagård	12 July	(Sweden) Oliver Söderström	(Finland) Ilmari Korpivaara	(Finland) Juuso Puhakka
5	R1	Kinnekulle Ring, Kinnekulle	22 August	(Sweden) Oliver Söderström	(Sweden) Oliver Söderström	(Sweden) Oliver Söderström
5	R2	Kinnekulle Ring, Kinnekulle	22 August	(Sweden) Oliver Söderström	(Finland) Juuso Puhakka	(Sweden) Oliver Söderström
6		Solvalla, Stockholm	12 September	(Finland) Juuso Puhakka	(Finland) Ilmari Korpivaara	(Finland) Juuso Puhakka
7	R1	Ring Knutstorp, Knutstorp	26 September	(Sweden) Oliver Söderström	(Sweden) Robert Svensson	(Sweden) Oliver Söderström
7	R2	Ring Knutstorp, Knutstorp	26 September	(Sweden) Oliver Söderström	(Sweden) Linus Lundqvist	(Sweden) Oliver Söderström

== Championship standings ==
Points system

Points were awarded to the top 10 classified finishers. Starting from this season, an extra point was awarded for pole position and fastest lap for each race.

Position	**1st**	**2nd**	**3rd**	**4th**	**5th**	**6th**	**7th**	**8th**	**9th**	**10th**	**Pole**	**FL**
Points	25	18	15	12	10	8	6	4	2	1	1	1

Parallel to the main championship, two other championships were held: the Formula Renault 1.6 Junior Svenskt Mästerskap (JSM) for drivers under 26 years old holding a Swedish driver license, and the Formula Renault 1.6 Northern European Zone (NEZ) championship at selected rounds. Points to these championships were awarded using the same system, with the sole exception of pole position and fastest lap not awarding points.

=== Formula Renault 1.6 Nordic Championship ===
Pos	Driver	SKÖ		AND			AHV		FAL			KIN		SOL	KNU		Pts
1	(Sweden) Oliver Söderström	**1**	1	2	**1**	**2**	DSQ	1	4	3	**Ret**	**1**	**1**	6	**1**	**1**	282
2	(Finland) Ilmari Korpivaara	2	**2**	1	3	4	**1**	**2**	**1**	**Ret**	2	3	3	2	4	3	258
3	(Finland) Juuso Puhakka	6	5	6	Ret	6	2	4	3	2	1	7	2	**1**	5	4	195
4	(Sweden) Linus Lundqvist	8	4	5	5	9	3	3	Ret	6	Ret	2	4	8	2	2	150
5	(Sweden) Robert Svensson	3	Ret	4	4	5			2	1	3	Ret	5	4	3	DSQ	146
6	(Germany) Laurents Hörr	5	3	**3**	2	1			5	5	5						115
7	(Sweden) Robin Fredriksson	7	7	7	6	8	4	5	Ret	8	8	4	DSQ	5	6	5	100
8	(Sweden) Reuben Kressner			8	Ret	3			9	4	4			3			60
9	(Sweden) Edward Jonasson	10	8	9	8	11	6	7	8	10	9	5	6	10	10	7	58
10	(Sweden) Rasmus Ericsson			Ret	7	7			Ret	7	7				7	6	38
11	(Sweden) Julia Holgersson			Ret	9	10	5	6	10	12	11	6	Ret	9	9	9	36
12	(Sweden) Daniel Johansson								7	11	10	DNS	DNS	7	8	8	21
13	(Germany) Nicholas Otto								6	9	6						18
14	(New Zealand) Paul Blomqvist	4	Ret														12
15	(Sweden) Otto Tjäder	9	6														10
Pos	Driver	SKÖ		AND			AHV		FAL			KIN		SOL	KNU		Pts

Colour	Result
Gold	Winner
Silver	Second place
Bronze	Third place
Green	Points classification
Blue	Non-points classification
Blue	Non-classified finish (NC)
Purple	Retired, not classified (Ret)
Red	Did not qualify (DNQ)
Red	Did not pre-qualify (DNPQ)
Black	Disqualified (DSQ)
White	Did not start (DNS)
White	Withdrew (WD)
White	Race cancelled (C)
Blank	Did not practice (DNP)
Blank	Did not arrive (DNA)
Blank	Excluded (EX)

**Bold** – Pole
Italics – Fastest Lap

=== Formula Renault 1.6 JSM Championship ===
Pos	Driver	SKÖ		AND			AHV		FAL			KIN		SOL	KNU		Pts
1	(Sweden) Oliver Söderström	1	1	2	1	2	DSQ	1	4	3	Ret	1	1	6	1	1	298
2	(Sweden) Linus Lundqvist	8	4	5	5	9	3	3	Ret	6	Ret	2	4	8	2	2	201
3	(Sweden) Robert Svensson	3	Ret	4	4	5			2	1	3	Ret	5	4	3	DSQ	192
4	(Sweden) Robin Fredriksson	7	7	7	6	8	4	5	Ret	8	8	4	DSQ	5	6	5	168
5	(Sweden) Edward Jonasson	10	8	9	8	11	6	7	8	10	9	5	6	10	10	7	128
6	(Sweden) Reuben Kressner			8	Ret	3			9	4	4			3			96
7	(Sweden) Julia Holgersson			Ret	9	10	5	6	10	12	11	6	Ret	9	9	9	83
8	(Sweden) Rasmus Ericsson			Ret	7	7			Ret	7	7				7	6	69
9	(Sweden) Daniel Johansson								7	11	10	DNS	DNS	7	8	8	53
10	(Sweden) Otto Tjäder	9	6														23
11	(New Zealand) (Sweden) Paul Blomqvist	4	Ret														15
Pos	Driver	SKÖ		AND			AHV		FAL			KIN		SOL	KNU		Pts

=== Formula Renault 1.6 NEZ Championship ===
Pos	Driver	AHV		KNU		Pts
1	(Sweden) Oliver Söderström	DSQ	1	**1**	**1**	75
2	(Finland) Ilmari Korpivaara	**1**	**2**	4	3	70
3	(Sweden) Linus Lundqvist	3	3	2	2	66
4	(Finland) Juuso Puhakka	2	4	5	4	52
5	(Sweden) Robin Fredriksson	4	5	6	5	40
6	(Sweden) Julia Holgersson	5	6	9	9	22
7	(Sweden) Edward Jonasson	6	7	10	7	21
8	(Sweden) Robert Svensson			3	DSQ	15
9	(Sweden) Rasmus Ericsson			7	6	14
10	(Sweden) Daniel Johansson			8	8	8
Pos	Driver	AHV		KNU		Pts
