= Antonio Serravalle =

Canadian racing driver

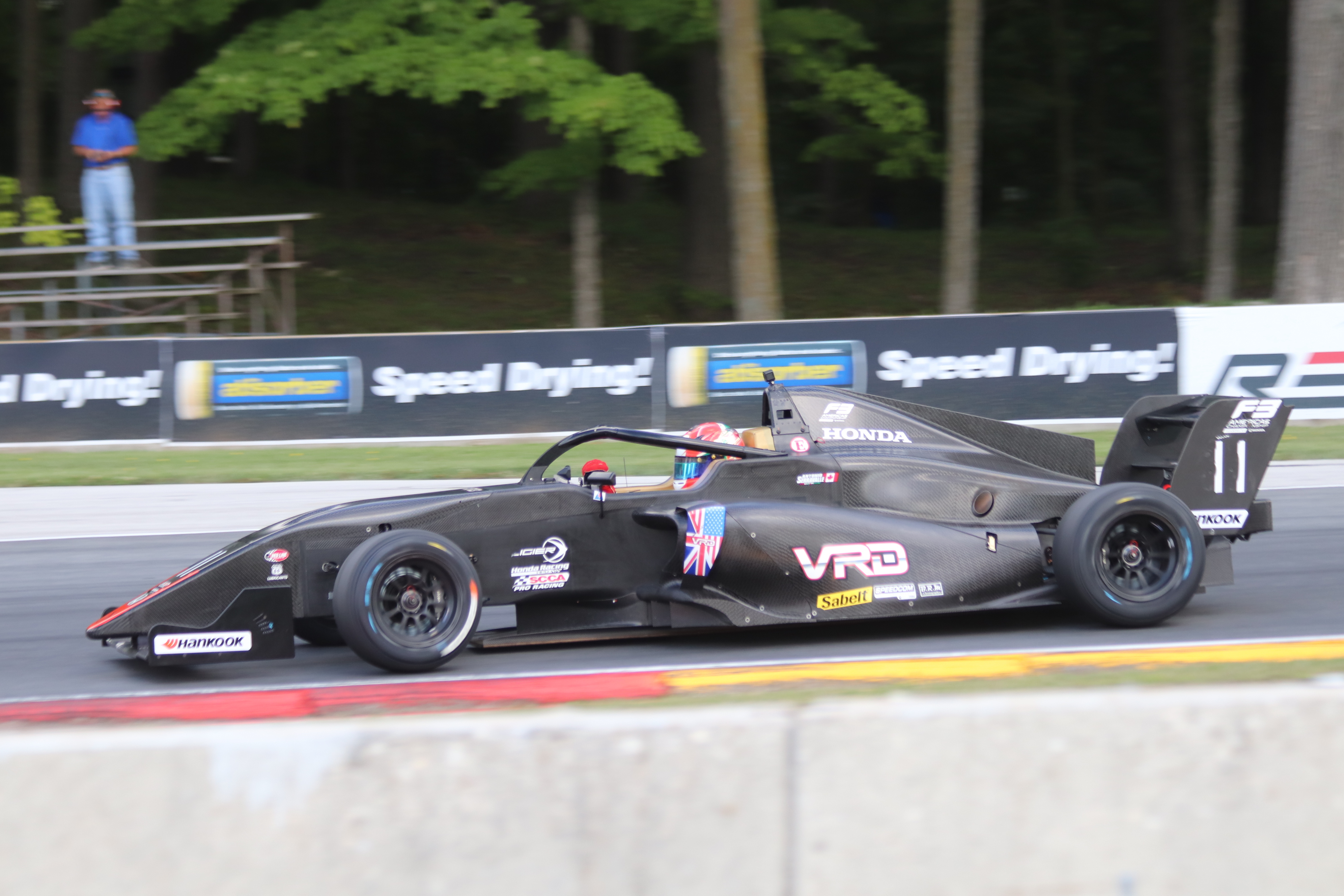
- Serravalle at Road America in 2019
- Nationality: (Canada) Canadian
- Born: 18 September 2002 (age 24) Toronto, Ontario, Canada

FIA World Endurance Championship career
- Debut season: 2024
- Current team: Isotta Fraschini
- Categorisation: FIA Silver
- Car number: 11
- Starts: 5
- Wins: 0
- Podiums: 0
- Poles: 0
- Fastest laps: 0
- Best finish: 33rd (LMH) in 2024

Indy Lights career
- 24 races run over 2 years
- Team(s): No. 11 (Abel Motorsports); No. 11 (HMD Motorsports with Dale Coyne Racing)
- Best finish: 6th (2021)
- First race: 2021 Indy Lights Grand Prix of Alabama (Birmingham)
- Last race: 2022 Indy Lights Grand Prix at Mid-Ohio (Mid-Ohio)
Wins	Podiums	Poles
0	0	0

Previous series
- 2023 2020 2019 2018: IMSA SportsCar Championship - LMP3; Formula Regional Americas Championship; Indy Pro 2000 Championship; Pro Mazda Championship

Antonio Serravalle (born 18 September 2002) is a Canadian racing driver who most recently competed in the FIA World Endurance Championship for Isotta Fraschini. He previously competed on the Road to Indy, competing in Indy Lights and the Indy Pro 2000 Championship.

== Career ==
=== FIA World Endurance Championship ===
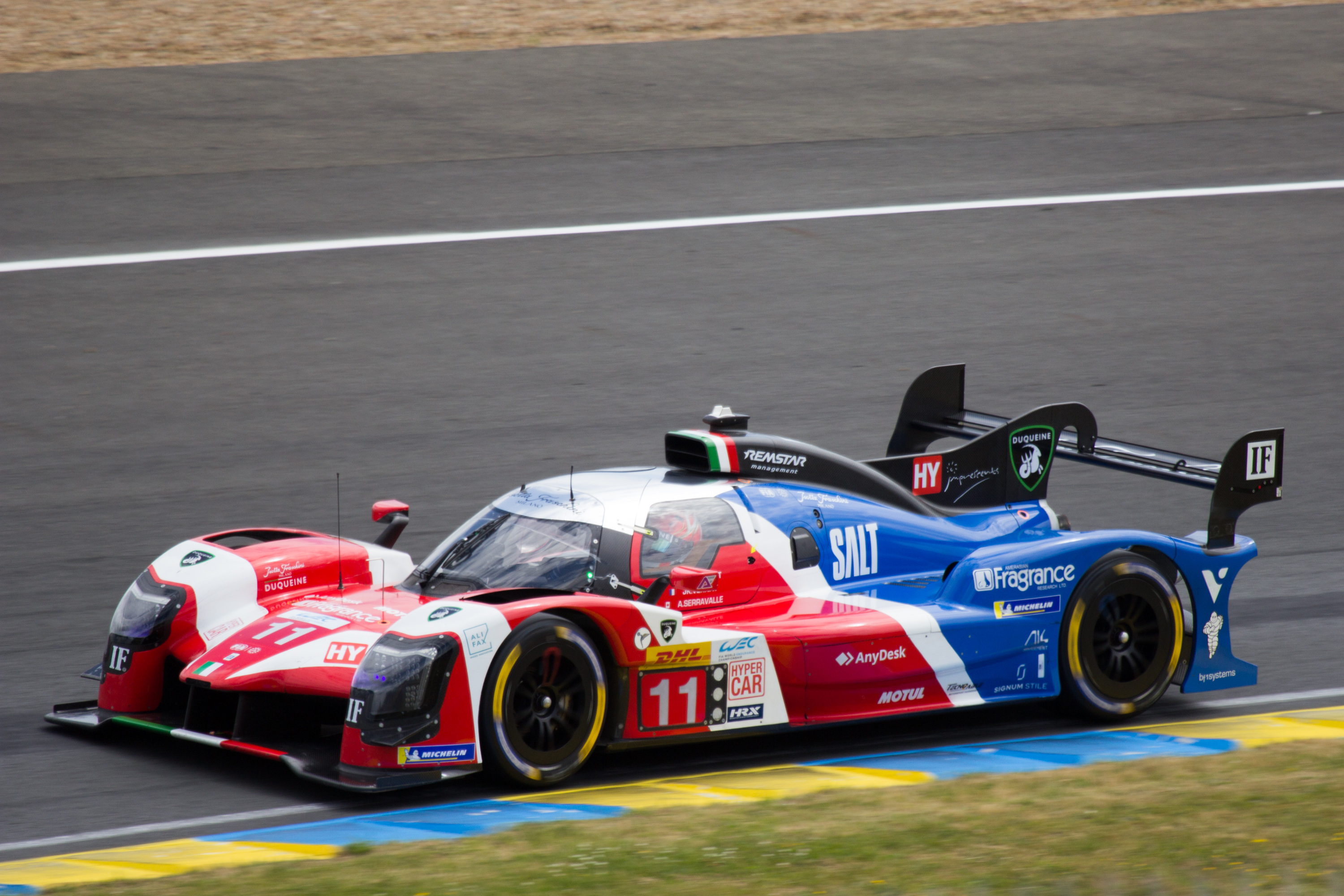
Serravalle piloting the Tipo 6 LMH-C at the 2024 24 Hours of Le Mans

In February 2024, after spending much of 2023 on the sidelines, Serravalle was announced to be stepping up to international competition in the top-flight Hypercar class of the FIA World Endurance Championship, driving for the debuting Isotta Fraschini team alongside Carl Bennett and Jean-Karl Vernay.

Following Isotta Fraschini's withdrawal from the 2024 season, Serravalle joined Proton Competition as a reserve driver for their Hypercar programme.

== Racing record ==
=== Career summary ===
Season	Series	Team	Races	Wins	Poles	F/Laps	Podiums	Points	Position
2018	Pro Mazda Championship	Exclusive Autosport	10	0	0	0	0	92	13th
2019	Indy Pro 2000 Championship	Pserra Racing w/ Jay Howard Driver Development; Pserra Racing w/ RP Motorsport Racing	14	0	0	0	0	188	10th
2019	F3 Americas Championship	Velocity Racing Development	2	0	0	0	0	8	16th
2020	Formula Regional Americas Championship	Jay Howard Driver Development	2	0	0	0	0	1	18th
2021	Indy Lights	Pserra Racing/AS Promotions	16	0	0	0	0	175	12th
2022	Indy Lights	Abel Motorsports	2	0	0	0	0	204	13th
2022	Indy Lights	HMD Motorsports with Dale Coyne Racing	7	0	0	0	0	204	13th
2023	IMSA SportsCar Championship - LMP3	FastMD Racing	1	0	0	0	0	0	NC
2023	IMSA VP Racing SportsCar Challenge - LMP3	Mühlner Motorsports America	2	0	0	0	2	620	12th
2024	24 Hours of Le Mans - Hypercar	Isotta Fraschini	1	0	0	0	0	N/A	14th
2024	FIA World Endurance Championship - Hypercar	Isotta Fraschini	5	0	0	0	0	0	33rd
2024	FIA World Endurance Championship - Hypercar	Proton Competition	Reserve driver						

^{*} Season still in progress.

=== American open–wheel racing results ===
==== Pro Mazda/Indy Pro 2000 Championship ====
Year	Team	1	2	3	4	5	6	7	8	9	10	11	12	13	14	15	16	Rank	Points
2018	Exclusive Autosport	STP; 11	STP; 13	BAR; 16	BAR; DNS	IMS; 9	IMS; 11	LOR; 8	ROA; 13	ROA; 12	TOR; 14	TOR; 11	MOH	MOH	GMP	POR	POR	13th	92
2019	Pserra Racing w/ Jay Howard Driver Development 1 Pserra Racing w/ RP Motorsport Racing 2	STP; 7	STP; 13	IMS; 9	IMS; 9	LOR; 12	ROA; DNS	ROA; 8	TOR; 4	TOR; 13	MOH; 7	MOH; 9	GTW	POR; 4	POR; 7	LAG; 10	LAG; 8	10th	188

==== Indy Lights ====
Year	Team	1	2	3	4	5	6	7	8	9	10	11	12	13	14	15	16	17	18	19	20	Rank	Points
2021	Pserra Racing/AS Promotions	ALA; 12	ALA; 11	STP; 7	STP; 10	IMS; 11	IMS; 11	DET; 12	DET; 11	RDA; 6	RDA; 10	MOH; 13	MOH; 12	GTW; 10	GTW; 12	POR	POR	LAG	LAG	MOH; 11	MOH; 12	12th	175
2022	Abel Motorsports	STP; 8	ALA; 9																			13th	204
2022	HMD Motorsports with Dale Coyne Racing			IMS; 6	IMS; 11	DET; 6	DET; 8	RDA; 13	MOH; 9	IOW; 12	NSH	GTW	POR	LAG	LAG							13th	204

=== Complete WeatherTech SportsCar Championship results ===
(key) (Races in bold indicate pole position; races in italics indicate fastest lap)

Year	Entrant	Class	Make	Engine	1	2	3	4	5	6	7	Rank	Points
2023	FastMD Racing	LMP3	Duqueine M30 - D08	Nissan VK56DE 5.6 L V8	DAY; 6†	SEB	WGL	MOS	ELK	IMS	PET	NC†	0†

^{†} Points only counted towards the Michelin Endurance Cup, and not the overall LMP3 Championship.

=== Complete FIA World Endurance Championship results ===
(key) (Races in bold indicate pole position) (Races in italics indicate fastest lap)

Year	Entrant	Class	Car	Engine	1	2	3	4	5	6	7	8	Rank	Points
2024	Isotta Fraschini	Hypercar	Isotta Fraschini Tipo 6 LMH-C	Isotta Fraschini 3.0 L Turbo V6	QAT; Ret	IMO; 17	SPA; 15	LMS; 14	SÃO; Ret	COA	FUJ	BHR	29th*	0*

=== Complete 24 Hours of Le Mans results ===
Year	Team	Co-Drivers	Car	Class	Laps	Pos.	Class Pos.
2024	(Italy) Isotta Fraschini	(Thailand) Carl Bennett (France) Jean-Karl Vernay	Isotta Fraschini Tipo 6 LMH-C	Hypercar	302	14th	14th
