= 2021 Indy Lights =

Indy Lights season

2021 Indy Lights season
- Indy Lights

Season
- Races: 20
- Start date: April 17
- End date: October 3

Awards
- Drivers' champion: (United States) Kyle Kirkwood
- Teams' champion: (United States) HMD Motorsports
- Rookie of the Year: (United States) Kyle Kirkwood

The 2021 Indy Lights season was the 35th season of the Indy Lights open wheel motor racing series and the 19th sanctioned by IndyCar, acting as the primary support series for the IndyCar Series. After going into a hiatus in 2020 because of the COVID-19 pandemic, the season started on April 17 at Barber Motorsports Park and was held over 20 races spanning ten meetings.

== Series news ==
- On October 7, 2020, Indy Lights announced a series of changes for the 2021 season. The champion's scholarship increased to $1,250,000. The top-three finishers in the championship each earned an IndyCar Series test and all cars were now equipped with a titanium halo to increase driver safety.

== Team and driver chart ==
The following drivers and teams competed in the series.

| Team | No. | Drivers | Round(s) |
|---|---|---|---|
| Andretti Autosport | 27 | (United States) Robert Megennis | All |
| Andretti Autosport | 28 | (United States) Kyle Kirkwood | All |
| Andretti Autosport | 68 | (Singapore) Danial Frost | All |
| Andretti Steinbrenner Autosport | 17 | (Canada) Devlin DeFrancesco | All |
| Carlin | 5 | (Australia) Alex Peroni | 1–14 |
| Carlin | 7 | (United States) Christian Bogle | All |
| Global Racing Group with HMD Motorsports | 24 | (United States) Benjamin Pedersen | All |
| Global Racing Group with HMD Motorsports | 26 | (Sweden) Linus Lundqvist | All |
| HMD Motorsports | 59 | (Russia) Nikita Lastochkin | 1–12 |
| HMD Motorsports | 59 | (Mexico) Manuel Sulaimán | 15–20 |
| HMD Motorsports | 79 | (United States) David Malukas | All |
| Juncos Racing; Juncos Hollinger Racing^{1} | 2 | (United States) Sting Ray Robb | All |
| Juncos Racing; Juncos Hollinger Racing^{1} | 51 | (United Kingdom) Toby Sowery | 1–14 |
| Juncos Racing; Juncos Hollinger Racing^{1} | 51 | (Sweden) Rasmus Lindh | 15–20 |
| Pserra Racing/AS Promotions | 11 | (Canada) Antonio Serravalle | 1–14, 19–20 |

^{1}Juncos Racing were rebranded as Juncos Hollinger Racing in August 2021

== Schedule ==
The provisional 2021 race calendar was announced on October 21, 2020, with the final round to be announced at a later date. This last round was later confirmed to be at Barber Motorsports park, after the IndyCar series moved its season opener there. The calendar was the first since 2002 to not feature the Freedom 100 at Indianapolis Motor Speedway. The Toronto round originally scheduled was replaced by a standalone second weekend at Mid-Ohio in October.

| Rd. | Date | Race name | Track | Location |
|---|---|---|---|---|
| 1 | April 17–18 | Indy Lights Grand Prix of Barber Motorsports Park; Presented by Cooper Tires | R Barber Motorsports Park | Birmingham, Alabama |
| 2 | April 17–18 | Indy Lights Grand Prix of Barber Motorsports Park; Presented by Cooper Tires | R Barber Motorsports Park | Birmingham, Alabama |
| 3 | April 24–25 | Indy Lights Grand Prix of St. Petersburg; Presented by Foundation Building Materials | R Streets of St. Petersburg | St. Petersburg, Florida |
| 4 | April 24–25 | Indy Lights Grand Prix of St. Petersburg; Presented by Andersen Interior Contracting | R Streets of St. Petersburg | St. Petersburg, Florida |
| 5 | May 14–15 | Indy Lights Grand Prix of Indianapolis; Presented by Cooper Tires | R Indianapolis Motor Speedway road course | Speedway, Indiana |
| 6 | May 14–15 | Indy Lights Grand Prix of Indianapolis; Presented by Cooper Tires | R Indianapolis Motor Speedway road course | Speedway, Indiana |
| 7 | June 12–13 | Indy Lights Grand Prix of Detroit; Presented by Cooper Tires | R The Raceway at Belle Isle Park | Detroit, Michigan |
| 8 | June 12–13 | Indy Lights Grand Prix of Detroit; Presented by Cooper Tires | R The Raceway at Belle Isle Park | Detroit, Michigan |
| 9 | June 19–20 | Cooper Tires Grand Prix of Road America; Powered by AER | R Road America | Elkhart Lake, Wisconsin |
| 10 | June 19–20 | Cooper Tires Grand Prix of Road America; Powered by AER | R Road America | Elkhart Lake, Wisconsin |
| 11 | July 3–4 | Cooper Tires Indy Lights Grand Prix of Mid-Ohio | R Mid-Ohio Sports Car Course | Lexington, Ohio |
| 12 | July 3–4 | Cooper Tires Indy Lights Grand Prix of Mid-Ohio | R Mid-Ohio Sports Car Course | Lexington, Ohio |
| 13 | August 20–21 | Cooper Tires Indy Lights Oval Challenge of St. Louis | O Gateway Motorsports Park | Madison, Illinois |
| 14 | August 20–21 | Cooper Tires Indy Lights Oval Challenge of St. Louis | O Gateway Motorsports Park | Madison, Illinois |
| 15 | September 11–12 | Cooper Tires Indy Lights Grand Prix of Portland | R Portland International Raceway | Portland, Oregon |
| 16 | September 11–12 | Cooper Tires Indy Lights Grand Prix of Portland | R Portland International Raceway | Portland, Oregon |
| 17 | September 18–19 | Indy Lights Grand Prix of Monterey; Presented by Cooper Tires | R WeatherTech Raceway Laguna Seca | Monterey, California |
| 18 | September 18–19 | Indy Lights Grand Prix of Monterey; Presented by Cooper Tires | R WeatherTech Raceway Laguna Seca | Monterey, California |
| 19 | October 1–3 | VP Racing Fuels Champhionship Weekend; Presented By Cooper Tires | R Mid-Ohio Sports Car Course | Lexington, Ohio |
| 20 | October 1–3 | VP Racing Fuels Champhionship Weekend; Presented By Cooper Tires | R Mid-Ohio Sports Car Course | Lexington, Ohio |

== Race results ==
| Round | Race | Pole position | Fastest lap | Most laps led | Race Winner | |
| Round | Race | Pole position | Fastest lap | Most laps led | Driver | Team |
|---|---|---|---|---|---|---|
| 1 | Birmingham 1 | (Sweden) Linus Lundqvist | (United Kingdom) Toby Sowery | (Sweden) Linus Lundqvist | (Sweden) Linus Lundqvist | HMD Motorsports |
| 2 | Birmingham 2 | (United States) David Malukas | (United States) David Malukas | (United States) David Malukas | (United States) David Malukas | HMD Motorsports |
| 3 | St. Petersburg 1 | (United States) Kyle Kirkwood | (United States) Kyle Kirkwood | (United States) Kyle Kirkwood | (United States) Kyle Kirkwood | Andretti Autosport |
| 4 | St. Petersburg 2 | (United States) David Malukas | (United States) Kyle Kirkwood | (United States) David Malukas | (United States) David Malukas | HMD Motorsports |
| 5 | Indianapolis GP 1 | (Sweden) Linus Lundqvist | (Sweden) Linus Lundqvist | (Sweden) Linus Lundqvist | (Sweden) Linus Lundqvist | HMD Motorsports |
| 6 | Indianapolis GP 2 | (United States) David Malukas | (United States) Kyle Kirkwood | (United States) David Malukas | (United States) David Malukas | HMD Motorsports |
| 7 | Detroit 1 | (United States) Kyle Kirkwood | (Sweden) Linus Lundqvist | (United States) Kyle Kirkwood | (United States) Kyle Kirkwood | Andretti Autosport |
| 8 | Detroit 2 | (Sweden) Linus Lundqvist | (United States) David Malukas | (United States) Kyle Kirkwood | (United States) Kyle Kirkwood | Andretti Autosport |
| 9 | Road America 1 | (Singapore) Danial Frost | (United States) Kyle Kirkwood | (United States) Kyle Kirkwood | (United States) Kyle Kirkwood | Andretti Autosport |
| 10 | Road America 2 | (Singapore) Danial Frost | (United States) Robert Megennis | (United States) David Malukas | (United States) David Malukas | HMD Motorsports |
| 11 | Mid-Ohio 1 | (United States) Kyle Kirkwood | (United States) Kyle Kirkwood | (United States) Kyle Kirkwood | (United States) Kyle Kirkwood | Andretti Autosport |
| 12 | Mid-Ohio 2 | (Singapore) Danial Frost | (Singapore) Danial Frost | (United States) Kyle Kirkwood | (United States) Kyle Kirkwood | Andretti Autosport |
| 13 | Gateway 1 | (United States) David Malukas | (United States) David Malukas | (United States) David Malukas | (United States) David Malukas | HMD Motorsports |
| 14 | Gateway 2 | (United States) Kyle Kirkwood | (United States) Kyle Kirkwood | (United States) Kyle Kirkwood | (United States) David Malukas | HMD Motorsports |
| 15 | Portland 1 | (United States) David Malukas | (United States) Kyle Kirkwood | (United States) David Malukas | (United States) David Malukas | HMD Motorsports |
| 16 | Portland 2 | (United States) David Malukas | (United States) Benjamin Pedersen | (United States) Kyle Kirkwood | (United States) Kyle Kirkwood | Andretti Autosport |
| 17 | Laguna Seca 1 | (United States) Kyle Kirkwood | (United States) Kyle Kirkwood | (United States) Kyle Kirkwood | (United States) Kyle Kirkwood | Andretti Autosport |
| 18 | Laguna Seca 2 | (United States) Kyle Kirkwood | (United States) Kyle Kirkwood | (United States) Kyle Kirkwood | (United States) Kyle Kirkwood | Andretti Autosport |
| 19 | Mid-Ohio 3 | (United States) Kyle Kirkwood | (Singapore) Danial Frost | (United States) Kyle Kirkwood | (United States) Kyle Kirkwood | Andretti Autosport |
| 20 | Mid-Ohio 4 | (United States) David Malukas | (United States) David Malukas | (Sweden) Linus Lundqvist | (Sweden) Linus Lundqvist | HMD Motorsports |

== Championship standings ==
=== Drivers' Championship ===
Scoring system

| Position | **1st** | **2nd** | **3rd** | **4th** | **5th** | **6th** | **7th** | **8th** | **9th** | **10th** | **11th** | **12th** | **13th** | **14th** | **15th** | **16th** | **17th** | **18th** | **19th** | **20th** |
| Points (R) | 30 | 25 | 22 | 19 | 17 | 15 | 14 | 13 | 12 | 11 | 10 | 9 | 8 | 7 | 6 | 5 | 4 | 3 | 2 | 1 |
| Points (O) | 45 | 38 | 33 | 29 | 26 | 23 | 21 | 20 | 18 | 17 | 15 | 14 | 12 | 11 | 9 | 8 | 6 | 5 | 4 | 2 |

- The driver who qualified on pole was awarded one additional point.
- An additional point was awarded to the driver who led the most laps in a race.

| Pos | Driver | ALA | | STP | | IMS | | DET | | ROA | | MOH1 | | GAT | | POR | | LAG | | MOH2 | | Points |
|---|---|---|---|---|---|---|---|---|---|---|---|---|---|---|---|---|---|---|---|---|---|---|
| 1 | (United States) Kyle Kirkwood RY | 9 | 5 | **1*** | 2 | 4 | 4 | **1*** | 1* | 1* | 12 | **1*** | 1* | 2 | **2*** | 2 | 1* | **1*** | **1*** | **1*** | 5 | 537 |
| 2 | (United States) David Malukas | 13 | **1*** | 3 | **1*** | 2 | **1*** | 5 | 3 | 7 | 1* | 3 | 3 | **1*** | 1 | **1*** | **2** | 4 | 2 | 2 | **2** | 524 |
| 3 | (Sweden) Linus Lundqvist R | **1*** | 2 | 9 | 3 | **1*** | 5 | 2 | **2** | 4 | 5 | 4 | 4 | 9 | 4 | 3 | 3 | 2 | 3 | 6 | 1* | 449 |
| 4 | (United States) Benjamin Pedersen R | 2 | 7 | 10 | 6 | 10 | 9 | 11 | 6 | 2 | 7 | 7 | 8 | 3 | 3 | 4 | 4 | 3 | 5 | 9 | 3 | 356 |
| 5 | (Singapore) Danial Frost R | 7 | 12 | 2 | 4 | 6 | 8 | 6 | 12 | **11** | **3** | 2 | **2** | 6 | 10 | 8 | 6 | 8 | 4 | 4 | 6 | 338 |
| 6 | (Canada) Devlin DeFrancesco R | 3 | 3 | 12 | 5 | 7 | 6 | 7 | 5 | 10 | 6 | 5 | 5 | 4 | 5 | 11 | 7 | 9 | 8 | 8 | 4 | 326 |
| 7 | (United States) Robert Megennis | 6 | 13 | 4 | 7 | 8 | 7 | 8 | 8 | 3 | 2 | 8 | 7 | 7 | 7 | 5 | 5 | 10 | 6 | 3 | 9 | 319 |
| 8 | (United States) Sting Ray Robb R | 8 | 8 | 6 | 13 | 9 | 10 | 10 | 10 | 8 | 9 | 11 | 10 | 12 | 11 | 9 | 11 | 6 | 9 | 5 | 7 | 249 |
| 9 | (United Kingdom) Toby Sowery | 4 | 4 | 13 | 9 | 3 | 2 | 3 | 4 | 5 | 13 | 6 | 6 | 11 | 8 | | | | | | | 236 |
| 10 | (Australia) Alex Peroni R | 5 | 6 | 5 | 8 | 5 | 3 | 4 | 13 | 13 | 4 | 9 | 9 | 5 | 6 | | | | | | | 228 |
| 11 | (United States) Christian Bogle R | 10 | 10 | 11 | 12 | 12 | 12 | 13 | 7 | 9 | 8 | 10 | 13 | 8 | 9 | 10 | 8 | 11 | 11 | 12 | 10 | 227 |
| 12 | (Canada) Antonio Serravalle R | 12 | 11 | 7 | 10 | 11 | 11 | 12 | 11 | 6 | 10 | 13 | 12 | 10 | 12 | | | | | 11 | 12 | 175 |
| 13 | (Russia) Nikita Lastochkin R | 11 | 9 | 8 | 11 | 13 | 13 | 9 | 9 | 12 | 11 | 12 | 11 | | | | | | | | | 123 |
| 14 | (Sweden) Rasmus Lindh R | | | | | | | | | | | | | | | 7 | 9 | 5 | 7 | 10 | 8 | 81 |
| 15 | (Mexico) Manuel Sulaimán R | | | | | | | | | | | | | | | 6 | 10 | 7 | 10 | 7 | 11 | 75 |
| Pos | Driver | ALA | | STP | | IMS | | DET | | ROA | | MOH1 | | GAT | | POR | | LAG | | MOH2 | | Points |

| Color | Result |
|---|---|
| Gold | Winner |
| Silver | 2nd place |
| Bronze | 3rd place |
| Green | 4th & 5th place |
| Light Blue | 6th–10th place |
| Dark Blue | Finished (Outside Top 10) |
| Purple | Did not finish |
| Red | Did not qualify (DNQ) |
| Brown | Withdrawn (Wth) |
| Black | Disqualified (DSQ) |
| White | Did not start (DNS) |
| Blank | Did not participate (DNP) |
| Blank | Not competing |

**In-line notation**
| **Bold** | Pole position (1 point) |
| Italics | Ran fastest race lap |
| * | Led most race laps (1 point) |
| ^{1} | Qualifying cancelled no bonus point awarded |
| R | Rookie |
| RY | Rookie of the Year |

- Ties in points broken by number of wins, or best finishes.

=== Teams' championship ===
Scoring system

| Position | **1st** | **2nd** | **3rd** | **4th** | **5th** | **6th** | **7th** | **8th** | **9th** | **10th+** |
| Points | 22 | 18 | 15 | 12 | 10 | 8 | 6 | 4 | 2 | 1 |

- Single car teams received 3 bonus points as an equivalency to multi-car teams
- Only the best two results counted for teams fielding more than two entries

| Pos | Team | ALA | | STP | | IMS | | DET | | ROA | | MOH1 | | GAT | | POR | | LAG | | MOH2 | | Points |
|---|---|---|---|---|---|---|---|---|---|---|---|---|---|---|---|---|---|---|---|---|---|---|
| 1 | HMD Motorsports (Note: Entry list has Global Racing Group as a separate team of two cars, while official points list HMD and GRG as the same team.) | 1 | 1 | 3 | 1 | 1 | 1 | 2 | 2 | 2 | 1 | 3 | 3 | 1 | 1 | 1 | 2 | 2 | 2 | 2 | 1 | 665 |
| 1 | HMD Motorsports | 2 | 2 | 7 | 3 | 2 | 5 | 5 | 3 | 4 | 5 | 4 | 4 | 3 | 3 | 3 | 3 | 3 | 3 | 5 | 2 | 665 |
| 2 | Andretti Autosport (Note: Entry list has Andretti / Andretti Steinbrenner as two teams with one and three cars, while official teams standings list it as a single team.) | 3 | 3 | 1 | 2 | 4 | 4 | 1 | 1 | 1 | 2 | 1 | 1 | 2 | 2 | 2 | 1 | 1 | 1 | 1 | 3 | 622 |
| 2 | Andretti Autosport | 6 | 5 | 2 | 4 | 6 | 6 | 6 | 5 | 3 | 3 | 2 | 2 | 4 | 4 | 4 | 4 | 6 | 4 | 3 | 4 | 622 |
| 3 | Juncos Racing; Juncos Hollinger Racing | 4 | 4 | 5 | 6 | 3 | 2 | 3 | 4 | 5 | 7 | 5 | 5 | 8 | 6 | 5 | 6 | 4 | 5 | 4 | 5 | 324 |
| 3 | Juncos Racing; Juncos Hollinger Racing | 7 | 7 | 9 | 9 | 7 | 7 | 7 | 7 | 7 | 9 | 8 | 7 | 9 | 8 | 6 | 7 | 5 | 6 | 6 | 6 | 324 |
| 4 | Carlin | 5 | 6 | 4 | 5 | 5 | 3 | 4 | 6 | 8 | 4 | 6 | 6 | 5 | 5 | 7 | 5 | 7 | 7 | 8 | 7 | 249 |
| 4 | Carlin | 8 | 8 | 8 | 8 | 9 | 9 | 9 | 9 | 9 | 6 | 7 | 9 | 6 | 7 | | | | | | | 249 |
| 5 | Pserra Racing/AS Promotions | 9 | 9 | 6 | 7 | 8 | 8 | 8 | 8 | 6 | 8 | 9 | 8 | 7 | 9 | | | | | 7 | 8 | 118 |
| Pos | Team | ALA | | STP | | IMS | | DET | | ROA | | MOH1 | | GAT | | POR | | LAG | | MOH2 | | Points |

== See also ==
- 2021 IndyCar Series
- 2021 Indy Pro 2000 Championship
- 2021 U.S. F2000 National Championship
