= Skövde Airport =

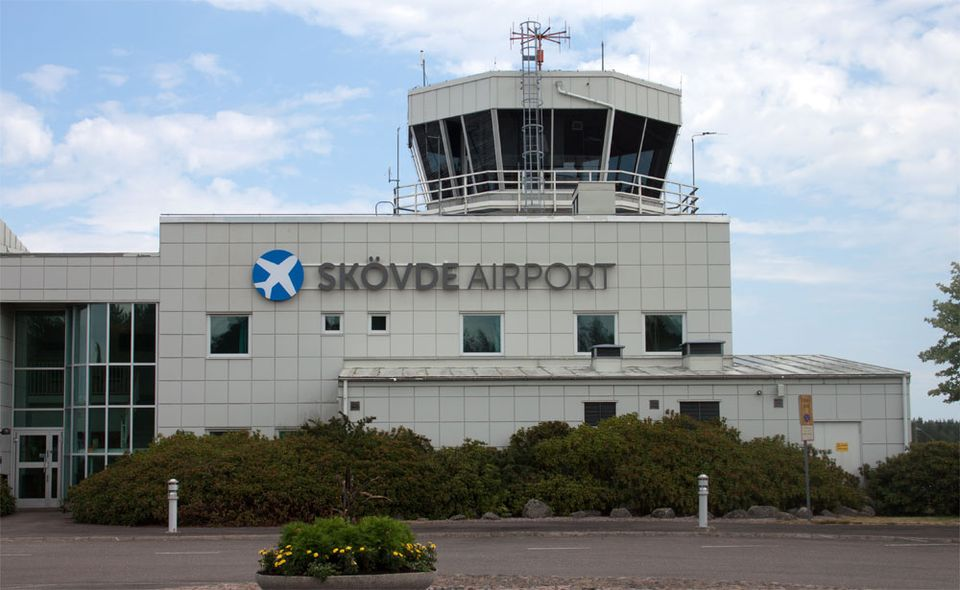
- IATA: KVB; ICAO: ESGR

Summary
- Airport type: Public
- Owner: Skövde Municipality (96 %)
- Operator: Skövde Airport AB
- Serves: Skövde
- Location: Skövde, Sweden
- Coordinates: 58°27′25″N 13°58′23″E
- Website: skovdeairport.com

Map
- Location of airport in Sweden

Runways
Direction	Length		Surface
Direction	ft	m	Surface
01/19	5,696	1,736	Asphalt

Skövde Airport (IATA: KVB, ICAO: ESGR) is an airport located in Skövde and was inaugurated in 1989. The airport was built as Skövde's replacement for the failed project for a joint airfield, Skarlanda, for Skaraborg County near Axvall outside Skara. Lidköping-Hovby Airport and Falköping Airport were also built after Skarlanda was not implemented.

== History ==
The runways were built by Skanska and Skövde Airport AB had a usage agreement of 25 years. Skövde Municipality replaced the airline as a contractual partner in 1993 and redeemed the runways early in 2012.

There is currently no regular commercial flight from Skövde Airport. Previously, the airline Swedair, Flying Enterprise between 1994 and 1999 and Skyways Regional operated from Stockholm Arlanda Airport to Skövde. Skyways Regional discontinued the last service to Arlanda in 2002. Previously, Copenhagen Airport was also served from Skövde. Nowadays, the airport is used for, among other things, private flights, ambulance flights and taxi flights. It was to a significant extent the train that competed with the flight. X 2000 was inaugurated in 1990, one year after the airport, and since 1995 (when the Grödinge line was opened) takes two hours to Stockholm. At 13 years old, Skövde Airport has the shortest time in Sweden from new construction to the closure of scheduled flights.

The current airport is located at Knistad and replaced an older airport built in 1938 at Aspelund which has become an industrial area.

== Skövde Airport Circuit ==
On 8–9 May 2015 and 1 May 2016, Skövde Airport hosted a round of the Scandinavian Touring Car Championship, Porsche Carrera Cup Scandinavia, Formula STCC Nordic and RallyX, when, among other things, a new runway was built at the airport at 2.146 km (1.333 mi).

The fastest official race lap records at the Skövde Airport Circuit are listed as:

Category	Time	Driver	Vehicle	Event
Full Circuit (2015–2016): 2.146 km (1.333 mi)
Silhouette racing car	0:49.964	Scott McLaughlin	Volvo S60 TTA	2016 Skövde STCC round
Porsche Carrera Cup	0:50.382	Philip Morin	Porsche 911 (991 I) GT3 Cup	2016 Skövde Porsche Carrera Cup Scandinavia round
Formula Renault 1.6	0:53.507	Laurents Hörr	Signatech FR1.6	2015 Skövde Formula Renault 1.6 Nordic round
Renault Clio Cup	0:57.242	Nicklas Oscarsson	Renault Clio IV RS	2016 Skövde Renault Clio Cup JTCC round
