= Jesse Salmenautio =

Finnish racing driver (born 2001)

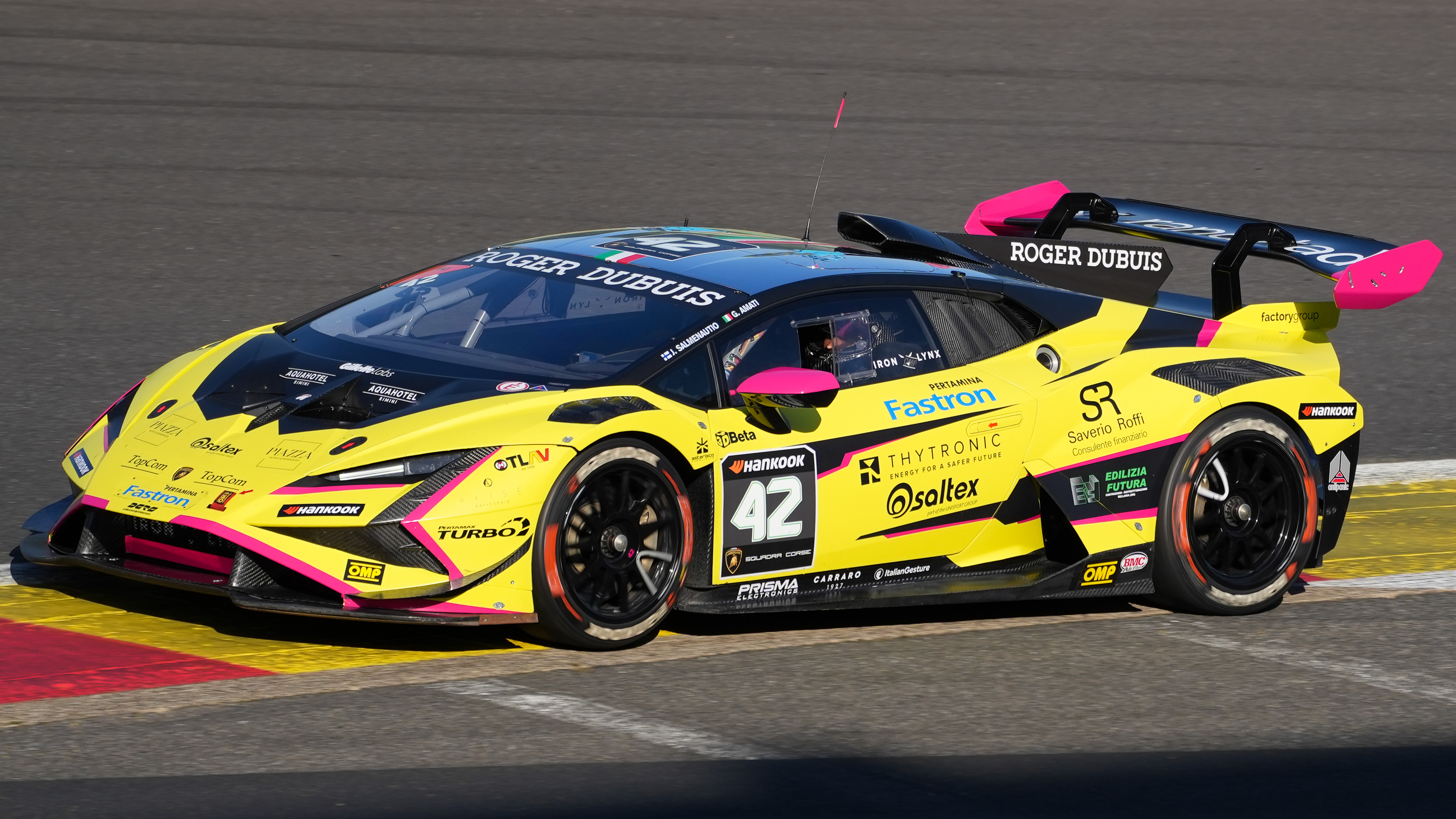
- Salmenautio in 2024
- Nationality: (Finland) Finnish
- Born: 11 August 2001 (age 25) Alajärvi, Finland

Italian GT Championship Endurance Cup career
- Debut season: 2026
- Current team: VSR
- Categorisation: FIA Silver
- Car number: 66
- Starts: 4
- Wins: 0
- Podiums: 0
- Poles: 0
- Fastest laps: 0
- Best finish: 10th in 2026

Previous series
- 2023, 2025 2024 2023 2022 2022 2018–2020 2018 2017: GT World Challenge Europe Sprint Cup; Lamborghini Super Trofeo Europe; GT World Challenge Europe Endurance Cup; Prototype Cup Germany; Asian Le Mans Series; Italian F4 Championship; SMP F4 Championship; Formula STCC Nordic

Jesse Salmenautio (born 11 August 2001) is a Finnish racing driver who last competed in the Italian GT Championship Endurance Cup for VSR.

== Career ==
Salmenautio began his single-seater career in 2017, competing for Kart in Club Driving Academy in Formula STCC Nordic. After finishing seventh in points with a best result of fourth, as well as making his Spanish F4 debut, Salmenautio remained with the team for a dual campaign in Formula Academy Finland and the SMP F4 Championship in 2018. In the former, Salmenautio won both races at Kemora to secure runner-up honours behind Michael Belov, whereas in the latter, he scored a best result of second at Moscow and Ahvenisto to end the year fifth overall. Towards the end of the year, Salmenautio also raced for the team in select rounds of ADAC F4, as well as competing in the Italian F4 finale for AS Motorsport.

In 2019, Salmenautio moved to DRZ Benelli to compete full-time in the Italian F4 Championship. In his first full-time season in the series, Salmenautio took a surprise podium at the Red Bull Ring in race two, en route to an 18th-place points finish at season's end. Moving to Bhaitech for the 2020 season, Salmenautio took a best result of sixth at both Misano and Imola to move up to 14th in the overall standings. Towards the end of the year, Salmenautio tested Formula Regional machinery for KIC Motorsport.

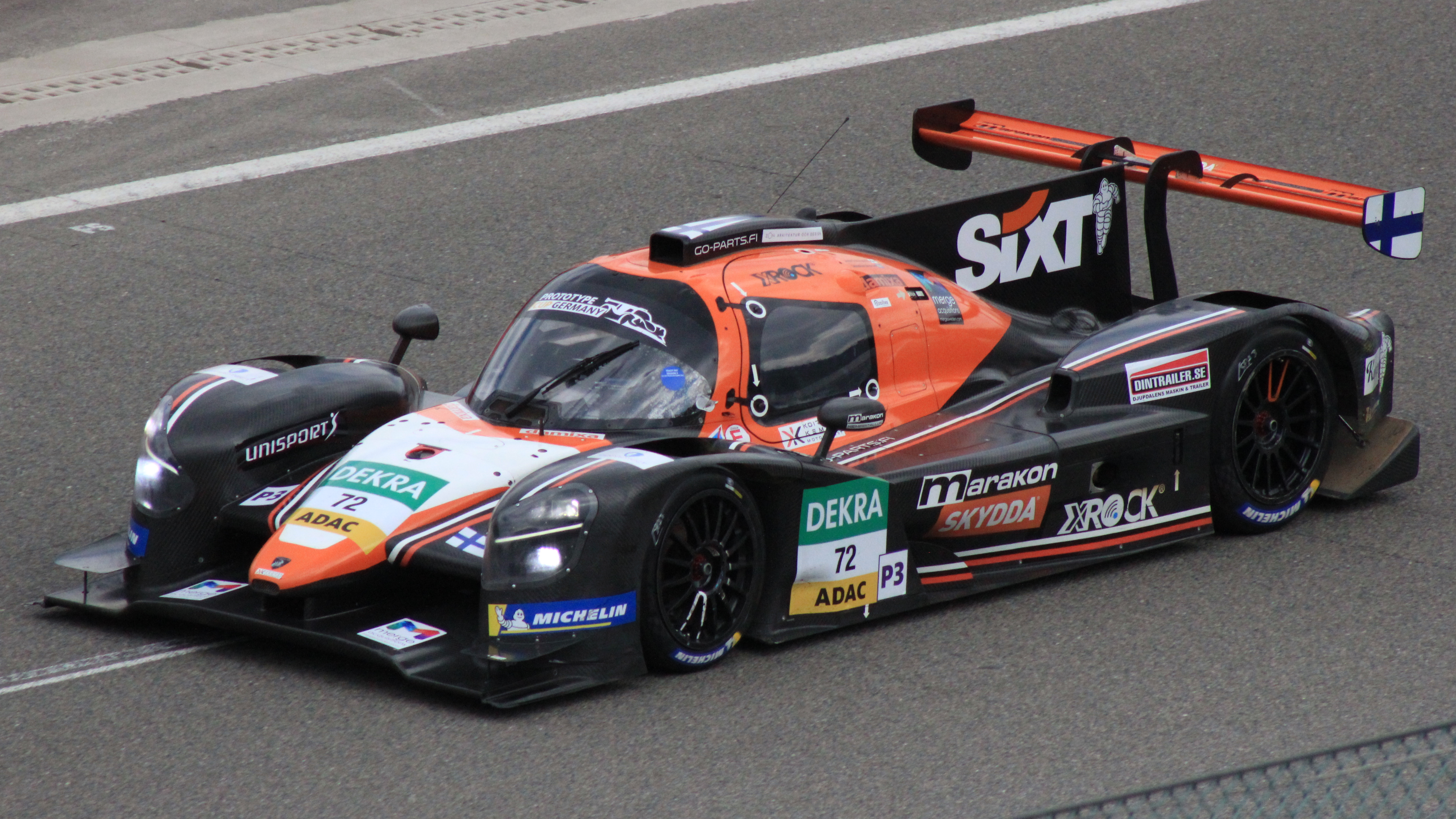
Salmenautio drove a Duqueine LMP3 for Koiranen Kemppi Motorsport in Prototype Cup Germany in 2022.

Despite taking part in pre-season testing for the 2021 International GT Open with Madpanda Motorsport, Salmenautio made his sportscar debut in 2022, driving for Koiranen Kemppi Motorsport in the LMP3 class of the Asian Le Mans Series. For the rest of the year, Salmenautio continued with the team to race in Prototype Cup Germany alongside Sebastian Arenram, taking a best result of fourth at the Hockenheimring to end the year 12th in points. Switching to GT3 machinery for 2023, Salmenautio reunited with Madpanda and team owner Ezequiel Pérez Companc to compete in the GT World Challenge Europe Sprint Cup. Driving a Mercedes-AMG GT3 Evo, Salmenautio scored seven Silver Cup podiums to clinch third in the class standings, as well as making his 24 Hours of Spa debut.

In 2024, Salmenautio moved to Iron Lynx to enter Lamborghini Super Trofeo Europe, as a member of the Lamborghini Junior Driver roster. Racing alongside Giorgio Amati in the Pro class, Salmenautio scored podiums at Spa and the Nürburgring to take eighth in points. In 2025, Salmenautio joined Corvette-fielding Steller Motorsport to compete in the GT World Challenge Europe Sprint Cup alongside Matisse Lismont. After contesting the first two rounds, Salmenautio wasn't featured on the entry list for Misano, and the team withdrew from the rest of the season over contractual issues with Lismont. Salmenautio then moved to Lamborghini-affiliated VSR to enter the Italian GT Championship Endurance Cup in 2026, as a member of the marque's GT3 Junior Driver roster.

== Karting record ==
=== Karting career summary ===
Season	Series	Team	Position
2014	Finnish Championship – Raket		18th
2016	Finnish Championship – OK-J		6th
2016	Rotax Max Challenge Finland – Junior Max		32nd
2016	Karting World Championship – OK-J	Kohtala Sports	75th

== Racing record ==
=== Racing career summary ===
Season	Series	Team	Races	Wins	Poles	F/Laps	Podiums	Points	Position
2017	Formula STCC Nordic	Kart in Club Driving Academy	12	0	0	1	0	85	7th
2017	F4 Spanish Championship	Kart in Club Driving Academy	6	0	0	0	0	1	18th
2018	SMP F4 Championship	Kart in Club Driving Academy	21	0	0	0	4	188	5th
2018	ADAC Formula 4 Championship	Kart in Club Driving Academy	4	0	0	0	0	0	NC†
2018	Formula Academy Finland	Kart in Club Driving Academy	10	2	1	4	4	149	**2nd**
2018	Italian F4 Championship	AS Motorsport	3	0	0	0	0	0	40th
2019	Italian F4 Championship	DRZ Benelli	17	0	0	0	1	20	18th
2019	Italian F4 Championship	Bhai Tech Racing	3	0	0	0	0	20	18th
2019	ADAC Formula 4 Championship	DRZ Benelli	3	0	0	0	0	0	NC†
2020	Italian F4 Championship	Bhaitech	20	0	0	0	0	40	14th
2022	Asian Le Mans Series – LMP3	Koiranen Kemppi Motorsport	4	0	0	0	0	16	10th
2022	Prototype Cup Germany	Koiranen Kemppi Motorsport	8	0	0	0	0	36	12th
2023	GT World Challenge Europe Sprint Cup	Madpanda Motorsport	10	0	0	0	0	0	NC
2023	GT World Challenge Europe Sprint Cup – Silver	Madpanda Motorsport	10	0	0	0	7	92	**3rd**
2023	GT World Challenge Europe Endurance Cup	Madpanda Motorsport	1	0	0	0	0	0	NC
2023	GT World Challenge Europe Endurance Cup – Silver	Madpanda Motorsport	1	0	0	0	0	18	16th
2023	Finnish Xtreme BMW Championship		10	0	0	0	2	132	6th
2024	Lamborghini Super Trofeo Europe – Pro	Iron Lynx	11	0	0	0	2	39.5	8th
2024	Lamborghini Super Trofeo World Final – Pro	Iron Lynx	2	0	0	0	0	4	10th
2024	Finnish Xtreme BMW SM		6	0	0	0	2	164	12th
2025	GT World Challenge Europe Sprint Cup	Steller Motorsport	4	0	0	0	0	0	NC
2025	GT World Challenge Europe Sprint Cup – Silver	Steller Motorsport	4	0	0	0	0	6	14th
2026	Italian GT Championship Endurance Cup – GT3	VSR	4	0	0	0	0	23	10th

^{†} As Salmenautio was a guest driver, he was ineligible to score points.

=== Complete Formula STCC Nordic results ===
(key) (Races in bold indicate pole position) (Races in italics indicate fastest lap)

Year	Team	1	2	3	4	5	6	7	8	9	10	11	12	13	14	Pos	Points
2017	Kart in Club Driving Academy	KNU; 1; 7	KNU; 2; 8	ALA; 1; 7	ALA; 2; 4	RUD; 1; 7	RUD; 2; 5	FAL; 1; 4	FAL; 2 Ret	KAR; 1 Ret	KAR; 2; 6	AND; 1; 4	AND; 2; 6	MAN; 1	MAN; 2	7th	85

=== Complete SMP F4 Championship results ===
(key) (Races in bold indicate pole position) (Races in italics indicate fastest lap)

Year	Team	1	2	3	4	5	6	7	8	9	10	11	12	13	14	15	16	17	18	19	20	21	Pos	Points
2018	Kart in Club Driving Academy	SMO; 1; 4	SMO; 2; 3	SMO; 3; 6	NRG; 1 Ret	NRG; 2; 6	NRG; 3; 7	MSC; 1; 5	MSC; 2; 5	MSC; 3; 8	ADM; 1; 2	ADM; 2; 4	ADM; 3; 4	AHV; 1; 4	AHV; 2; 2	AHV; 3; 2	ALA; 1; 6	ALA; 2; 4	ALA; 3; 4	ASS; 1; 4	ASS; 2; 5	ASS; 3; 9	5th	188

=== Complete Italian F4 Championship results ===
(key) (Races in bold indicate pole position) (Races in italics indicate fastest lap)

Year	Team	1	2	3	4	5	6	7	8	9	10	11	12	13	14	15	16	17	18	19	20	21	22	Pos	Points
2018	AS Motorsport	ADR; 1	ADR; 2	ADR; 3	LEC; 1	LEC; 2	LEC; 3	MNZ; 1	MNZ; 2	MNZ; 3	MIS; 1	MIS; 2	MIS; 3	IMO; 1	IMO; 2	IMO; 3	VLL; 1	VLL; 2	VLL; 3	MUG; 1; 17	MUG; 2; 19	MUG; 3; 18		40th	0
2019	DRZ Benelli	VLL; 1; 10	VLL; 2; 20	VLL; 3; 29	MIS; 1; 20	MIS; 2; 26	MIS; 3 C	HUN; 1; 11	HUN; 2; 12	HUN; 3; 25	RBR; 1; 15	RBR; 2; 3	RBR; 3; 16	IMO; 1; 14	IMO; 2; 16	IMO; 3; 15	IMO; 4; 12	MUG; 1; 12	MUG; 2; 18	MUG; 3; 18				18th	20
2019	Bhai Tech Racing																				MNZ; 1; 11	MNZ; 2; 20	MNZ; 3; 8	18th	20
2020	Bhaitech	MIS; 1; 9	MIS; 2; 9	MIS; 3; 6	IMO1; 1 Ret	IMO1; 2; 8	IMO1; 3; 6	RBR; 1; 8	RBR; 2; 11	RBR; 3; 26†	MUG; 1; 17	MUG; 2; 20	MUG; 3; 8	MNZ; 1; 20†	MNZ; 2; 7	MNZ; 3; 10	IMO2; 1; 28	IMO2; 2; 10	IMO2; 3; 19	VLL; 1; 13	VLL; 2 C	VLL; 3; 14		14th	40

=== Complete Asian Le Mans Series results ===
(key) (Races in bold indicate pole position) (Races in italics indicate fastest lap)

Year	Team	Class	Car	Engine	1	2	3	4	Pos.	Points
2022	Koiranen Kemppi Motorsport	LMP3	Duqueine M30 - D08	Nissan VK50VE 5.0 L V8	DUB; 1; 6	DUB; 2; 8	ABU; 1; 8	ABU; 2 Ret	10th	16

=== Complete Prototype Cup Germany results ===
(key) (Races in bold indicate pole position) (Races in italics indicate fastest lap)

Year	Team	Car	Engine	1	2	3	4	5	6	7	8	DC	Points
2022	Koiranen Kemppi Motorsport	Duqueine M30 - D08	Nissan VK56DE 5.6 L V8	SPA; 1 Ret	SPA; 2; 9	NÜR; 1 Ret	NÜR; 2; 8	LAU; 1; 6	LAU; 2 Ret	HOC; 1; 4	HOC; 2 Ret	12th	36

=== Complete GT World Challenge results ===
==== GT World Challenge Europe Sprint Cup ====
(key) (Races in bold indicate pole position) (Races in italics indicate fastest lap)

Year	Team	Car	Class	1	2	3	4	5	6	7	8	9	10	Pos.	Points
2023	Madpanda Motorsport	Mercedes-AMG GT3 Evo	Silver	BRH; 1; 25	BRH; 2; 18	MIS; 1; 16	MIS; 2; 14	HOC; 1; 14	HOC; 2; 17	VAL; 1; 25	VAL; 2; 22	ZAN; 1; 15	ZAN; 2; 14	3rd	92
2025	Steller Motorsport	Chevrolet Corvette Z06 GT3.R	Silver	BRH; 1; 26	BRH; 2; 23	ZAN; 1 Ret	ZAN; 2; 23	MIS; 1	MIS; 2	MAG; 1	MAG; 2	VAL; 1	VAL; 2	14th	6

==== GT World Challenge Europe Endurance Cup ====
Year	Team	Car	Class	1	2	3	4	5	6	7	Pos.	Points
2023	Madpanda Motorsport	Mercedes-AMG GT3 Evo	Silver	MNZ	LEC	SPA; 6H; 39	SPA; 12H; 54	SPA; 24H; 39	NÜR	CAT	16th	18
