= William Alatalo =

Finnish racing driver

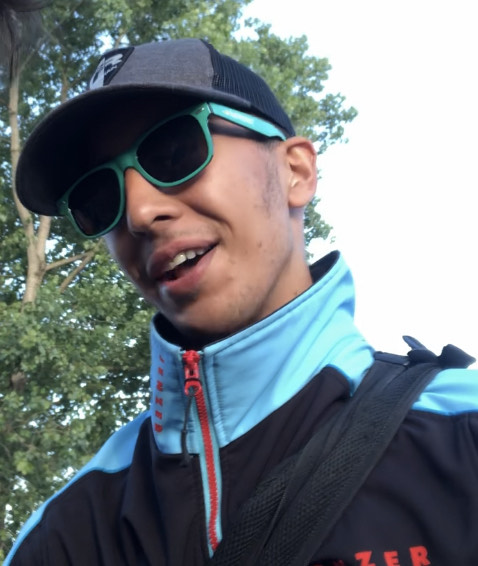
- Alatalo at the Red Bull Ring in 2022
- Nationality: (Finland) Finnish
- Born: 19 April 2002 (age 24) Ilmajoki, Finland

FIA Formula 3 Championship career
- Debut season: 2022
- Categorisation: FIA Silver
- Former teams: Jenzer Motorsport
- Starts: 18 (18 entries)
- Wins: 0
- Podiums: 0
- Poles: 0
- Fastest laps: 0
- Best finish: 18th in 2022

Previous series
- 2021 2020 2018-19 2017: FR European Championship; Formula Renault Eurocup; Italian F4 Championship; Formula STCC Nordic
Medal record
Formula 4
Representing Finland
FIA Motorsport Games
Bronze medal – third place	2019 Rome	Formula 4 Cup

William Alatalo (born 19 April 2002) is a Finnish racing driver of Ethiopian descent currently competing in the Italian GT Championship with Lazarus Corse. He most recently raced for Jenzer Motorsport in the FIA Formula 3 Championship.

== Career ==
=== Karting ===
Born in Ilmajoki, Alatalo started karting at the age of seven. He won the Finnish championship in the Cadet (2010), Raket (2014) and OKJ (2016) karting classes.

=== Formula STCC Nordic ===
In 2017, Alatalo made his single-seater debut in Formula STCC Nordic with Kart In Club Driving Academy. Alatalo won one race at Anderstorp and finished the season fifth with 142 points.

=== Italian F4 Championship ===
Alatalo moved to the Italian F4 Championship for 2018 where he spent two years driving for Mücke Motorsport. The two seasons in Italy netted him one win and another podium finish in 42 races.

=== Formula Renault Eurocup ===
In 2020, Alatalo contested the Formula Renault Eurocup driving for JD Motorsport. He achieved two podiums and a pole position during the season and finished 8th in the standings with 92 points.

=== Formula Regional European Championship ===
==== 2021 ====
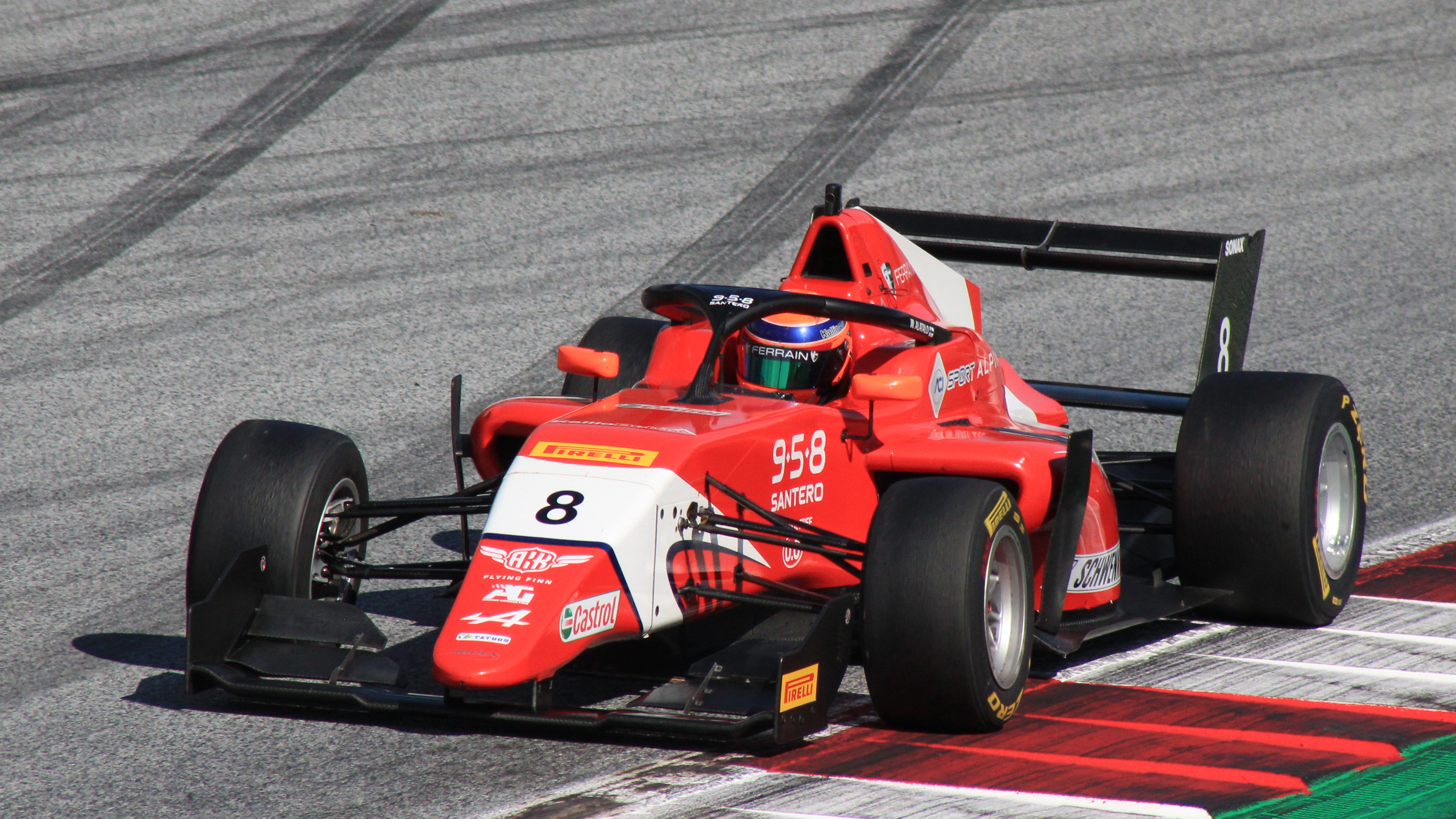
Alatalo racing in the 2021 Formula Regional European Championship

The following year, Alatalo moved to Arden Motorsport, partnering Alex Quinn and Nicola Marinangeli in the Formula Regional European Championship. His campaign proved to be consistent, with Alatalo finishing every race and being outside of the top-ten on only seven occasions. His best result would end up being a third place at the Circuit Paul Ricard, and he finished the season in eleventh place, two positions behind Quinn.

==== 2022 ====
Alatalo was called up to replace Santiago Ramos at the season finale in Mugello with KIC Motorsport, a month after the final round of Alatalo's F3 season.

=== FIA Formula 3 Championship ===
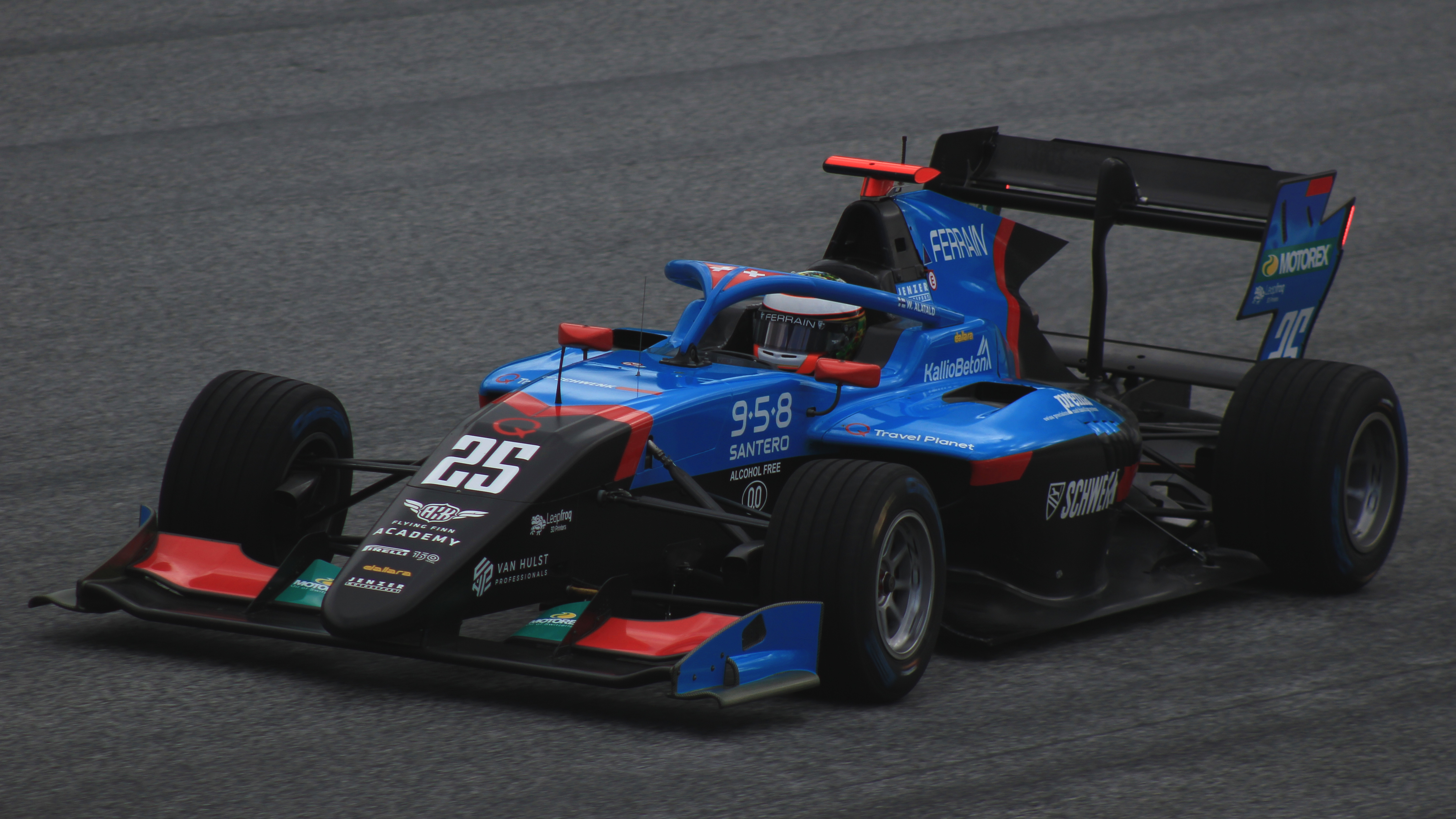
Alatalo driving the Dallara F3 2019 during the 2022 Spielberg Formula 3 round

In 2022, Alatalo made the step-up to the FIA Formula 3 Championship with Jenzer Motorsport, having taken part in a number of test days with the Swiss team in the winter. Upon the announcement of his signing, Alatalo commented that this move brought him "one step closer to [his] dream". He managed to score a points in the first feature race at Bahrain, and followed that up with another point in the next feature race in Imola, benefiting from a penalty for Ollie Bearman. Alatalo then went on a points-scoring drought lasting five races, until he managed to collect four points in tricky weather conditions at the Red Bull Ring. Two point-less races in Budapest would come before a fruitful weekend at Spa: there, Alatalo took points in both races, ending up sixth on Saturday and seventh in the feature race. Despite this, a mistake at the restart of the sprint race, where he went into the gravel and lost four positions, cost him a chance at a higher position, which Alatalo took full blame for and described as having been "quite rubbish". A disappointing round at Zandvoort followed, where Alatalo caused a premature end to qualifying after a crash in turn 3, but he would score a best qualifying result of seventh in the final round at Monza, which he called "a good way to end the last qualifying of the season". Alatalo had more points than either his teammates Cohen (two points) or Malvestiti (zero points), scoring 24 points and thus finishing 18th in the standings.

== Personal life ==
Alatalo goes to school at Kuortaneen urheilulukio.

Alatalo was born to a Finnish father, Markku, and an Ethiopian mother, Mini. He has a younger brother, Daniel.

== Karting record ==
=== Karting career summary ===
Season	Series	Team	Position
2013	Finnish Cup — Raket		5th
2014	Rotax Max Challenge Finland — Mini Max		26th
2014	Finnish Junior Championship — Raket		**1st**
2015	South Garda Winter Cup — KFJ	Mad-Croc Karting	DNF
2015	Göteborgs Stora Pris — KF3	Mad-Croc Karting	7th
2015	Finnish Cup Championship — KFJ	Mad-Croc Karting	7th
2015	CIK-FIA European Championship — KFJ	Mad-Croc Karting	46th
2015	CIK-FIA World Championship — KFJ	Mad-Croc Karting	28th
2016	WSK Champions Cup — OKJ	Mad-Croc Karting	32nd
2016	South Garda Winter Cup — OKJ		NC
2016	X30 Challenge Europa — X30 Junior		23rd
2016	Finnish Championship — OKJ		**1st**
2016	German Karting Championship — OKJ		46th
2016	WSK Super Master Series — OKJ	Mad-Croc Karting	35th
2016	CIK-FIA European Championship — OKJ	RB Racing	27th
2016	WSK Final Cup — OKJ	RB Racing	18th
2016	CIK-FIA World Championship — OKJ	RB Racing	33rd
2017	WSK Champions Cup — OK	CRG SpA	14th
2017	South Garda Winter Cup — OK		31st

=== Complete CIK-FIA Karting European Championship results ===
(key) (Races in bold indicate pole position) (Races in italics indicate fastest lap)

Year	Team	Class	1	2	3	4	5	6	7	8	9	10	11	12	DC	Points
2015	Mad-Croc Karting	KFJ	PRT; QH; 44	SAR; R DNQ	PFI; QH; 45	PFI; R DNQ	KRI; QH; 35	KRI; R DNQ							46th	0
2016	RB Racing	OKJ	ZUE; QH; 25	ZUE; PF; 10	ZUE; R 31	ADR; QH; 35	ADR; PF; 17	ADR; R 13	PRT; QH; 23	PRT; PF; 16	PRT; R 33	GEN; QH; 31	GEN; PF; 9	GEN; R 17	27th	23

== Racing record ==
=== Racing career summary ===
Season	Series	Team	Races	Wins	Poles	F/Laps	Podiums	Points	Position
2017	Formula STCC Nordic	Kart in Club Driving Academy	13	1	0	1	4	142	5th
2017–18	Formula 4 UAE Championship	Mücke Motorsport	8	2	0	0	4	104	9th
2018	Italian F4 Championship	BWT Mücke Motorsport	21	1	0	0	2	108	8th
2019	Italian F4 Championship	BWT Mücke Motorsport	21	0	0	2	0	118	9th
2019	ADAC Formula 4 Championship	ADAC Berlin-Brandenburg	3	0	0	0	2	43	16th
2019	FIA Motorsport Games Formula 4 Cup	Team Finland	1	0	0	0	1	N/A	**3rd**
2020	Formula Renault Eurocup	JD Motorsport	20	0	1	0	2	92	8th
2021	Formula Regional European Championship	Arden Motorsport	20	0	0	0	1	91	11th
2022	FIA Formula 3 Championship	Jenzer Motorsport	18	0	0	0	0	24	18th
2022	Formula Regional European Championship	KIC Motorsport	2	0	0	0	0	0	NC†
2023	Italian GT Sprint Championship - GT3	AKM Motorsport	2	0	0	0	0	0	NC†
2024	Italian GT Sprint Championship - GT3 Pro-Am	Lazarus Corse	8	0	1	0	2	64	4th
2024	Italian GT Endurance Championship - GT3 Pro-Am	Lazarus Corse	0	0	0	0	0	14*	12th*
2025	Italian GT Championship Sprint Cup - GT3	BMW Italia Ceccato Racing	8	0	0	0	2	61	5th
2025	China GT Championship - GT3	FIST Team AAI	2	0	?	?	0	18	19th
2026	Italian GT Championship Endurance Cup - GT3	BMW Italia Ceccato Racing	4	1	0	0	2	46	4th

^{†} As Alatalo was a guest driver, he was ineligible to score points.
* Season still in progress.

=== Complete Formula STCC Nordic results ===
(key) (Races in bold indicate pole position) (Races in italics indicate fastest lap)

Year	Team	1	2	3	4	5	6	7	8	9	10	11	12	13	14	Pos	Points
2017	Kart in Club Driving Academy	KNU; 1; 8	KNU; 2; 9	ALA; 1; 4	ALA; 2 DNS	RUD; 1; 3	RUD; 2; 4	FAL; 1; 5	FAL; 2 Ret	KAR; 1; 2	KAR; 2; 5	AND; 1; 6	AND; 2; 1	MAN; 1; 5	MAN; 2; 3	5th	142

=== Complete Formula 4 UAE Championship results ===
(key) (Races in bold indicate pole position) (Races in italics indicate fastest lap)

Year	Team	1	2	3	4	5	6	7	8	9	10	11	12	13	14	15	16	17	18	19	20	21	22	23	24	Pos	Points
2017-18	Mücke Motorsport	YMC1; 1	YMC1; 2	YMC1; 3	YMC1; 4	YMC2; 1	YMC2; 2	YMC2; 3	YMC2; 4	DUB1; 1	DUB1; 2	DUB1; 3	DUB1; 4	YMC3; 1; 11	YMC3; 2; 6	YMC3; 3; 3	YMC3; 4; 3	YMC4; 1; 4	YMC4; 2; 8	YMC4; 3; 1	YMC4; 4; 1	DUB2; 1	DUB2; 2	DUB2; 3	DUB2; 4	9th	104

=== Complete Italian F4 Championship results ===
(key) (Races in bold indicate pole position) (Races in italics indicate fastest lap)

Year	Team	1	2	3	4	5	6	7	8	9	10	11	12	13	14	15	16	17	18	19	20	21	22	Pos	Points
2018	BWT Mücke Motorsport	ADR; 1; 9	ADR; 2 Ret	ADR; 3 Ret	LEC; 1; 26	LEC; 2; 32	LEC; 3; 13	MNZ; 1; 4	MNZ; 2; 1	MNZ; 3; 2	MIS; 1; 12	MIS; 2; 13	MIS; 3; 6	IMO; 1; 8	IMO; 2; 19	IMO; 3 Ret	VLL; 1; 5	VLL; 2; 7	VLL; 3; 6	MUG; 1; 4	MUG; 2; 10	MUG; 3; 12		8th	108
2019	BWT Mücke Motorsport	VLL; 1; 8	VLL; 2; 6	VLL; 3 Ret	MIS; 1; 6	MIS; 2; 9	MIS; 3 C	HUN; 1; 4	HUN; 2; 13	HUN; 3; 5	RBR; 1; 4	RBR; 2; 5	RBR; 3; 6	IMO; 1; 6	IMO; 2 Ret	IMO; 3 Ret	IMO; 4; 14	MUG; 1; 9	MUG; 2; 7	MUG; 3; 8	MNZ; 1; 4	MNZ; 2; 4	MNZ; 3; 22	9th	118

=== Complete ADAC Formula 4 Championship results ===
(key) (Races in bold indicate pole position) (Races in italics indicate fastest lap)

Year	Team	1	2	3	4	5	6	7	8	9	10	11	12	13	14	15	16	17	18	19	20	Pos	Points
2019	ADAC Berlin-Brandenburg	OSC; 1	OSC; 2	OSC; 3	RBR; 1; 3	RBR; 2; 2	RBR; 3; 5	HOC1; 1	HOC1; 2	ZAN; 1	ZAN; 2	ZAN; 3	NÜR; 1	NÜR; 2	NÜR; 3	HOC2; 1	HOC2; 2	HOC2; 3	SAC; 1	SAC; 2	SAC; 3	16th	43

=== Complete FIA Motorsport Games results ===
Year	Entrant	Cup	Qualifying	Quali Race	Main race
2019	Team Finland	**Formula 4**	10th	5th	**3rd**

=== Complete Formula Renault Eurocup results ===
(key) (Races in bold indicate pole position) (Races in italics indicate fastest lap)

Year	Team	1	2	3	4	5	6	7	8	9	10	11	12	13	14	15	16	17	18	19	20	Pos	Points
2020	JD Motorsport	MNZ; 1 Ret	MNZ; 2; 5	IMO; 1; 3	**IMO**; **2**; 2	NÜR; 1; 5	NÜR; 2 Ret	MAG; 1; 9	MAG; 2; 8	ZAN; 1; 11	ZAN; 2; 10	CAT; 1; 12	CAT; 2; 8	SPA; 1; 9‡	SPA; 2; 9	IMO; 1; 8	IMO; 2; 9	HOC; 1; 7	HOC; 2; 9	LEC; 1; 11	LEC; 2; 7	8th	92

^{‡} Half points awarded as less than 75% of race distance was completed.

=== Complete Formula Regional European Championship results ===
(key) (Races in bold indicate pole position) (Races in italics indicate fastest lap)

Year	Team	1	2	3	4	5	6	7	8	9	10	11	12	13	14	15	16	17	18	19	20	DC	Points
2021	Arden Motorsport	IMO; 1; 6	IMO; 2; 5	CAT; 1; 6	CAT; 2; 7	MCO; 1; 8	MCO; 2; 14	LEC; 1; 9	LEC; 2; 3	ZAN; 1; 12	ZAN; 2; 4	SPA; 1; 9	SPA; 2; 10	RBR; 1; 8	RBR; 2; 15	VAL; 1; 13	VAL; 2; 13	MUG; 1; 4	MUG; 2; 16	MNZ; 1; 14	MNZ; 2; 9	11th	91
2022	KIC Motorsport	MNZ; 1	MNZ; 2	IMO; 1	IMO; 2	MCO; 1	MCO; 2	LEC; 1	LEC; 2	ZAN; 1	ZAN; 2	HUN; 1	HUN; 2	SPA; 1	SPA; 2	RBR; 1	RBR; 2	CAT; 1	CAT; 2	MUG; 1; 22	MUG; 2; 26	NC†	0

† As Alatalo was a guest driver, he was ineligible to score points.

=== Complete FIA Formula 3 Championship results ===
(key) (Races in bold indicate pole position; races in italics indicate points for the fastest lap of top ten finishers)

Year	Entrant	1	2	3	4	5	6	7	8	9	10	11	12	13	14	15	16	17	18	DC	Points
2022	Jenzer Motorsport	BHR; SPR; 11	BHR; FEA; 9	IMO; SPR; 15	IMO; FEA; 10	CAT; SPR; 15	CAT; FEA; 12	SIL; SPR; 19	SIL; FEA; 16	RBR; SPR; Ret	RBR; FEA; 8	HUN; SPR; 16	HUN; FEA; 16	SPA; SPR; 6	SPA; FEA; 7	ZAN; SPR; 30	ZAN; FEA; Ret	MNZ; SPR; 14	MNZ; FEA; 7	18th	24

=== Complete Italian GT Championship results ===
==== Italian GT Sprint Championship ====
(key) (Races in bold indicate pole position) (Races in italics indicate fastest lap)

Year	Team	Class	Car	1	2	3	4	5	6	7	8	Pos.	Points
2023	AKM Motorsport	GT3	Mercedes-AMG GT3 Evo	MIS; 1	MIS; 2	MNZ; 1; 14	MNZ; 2; 15	MUG; 1	MUG; 2	IMO; 1	IMO; 2	NC	0
2024	Lazarus Corse	GT3	Aston Martin Vantage AMR GT3 Evo	MIS; 1; 18	MIS; 2; 12	IMO; 1; 10	IMO; 2; 10	MUG; 1; 5	MUG; 2; 16	MNZ; 1; 9	MNZ; 2; 10	15th	13
2025	BMW Italia Ceccato Racing	GT3	BMW M4 GT3 Evo	VAL; 1; 3	VAL; 2 Ret	MUG; 1; 2	MUG; 2; 5	IMO; 1; 4	IMO; 2; 6	MNZ; 1; 4	MNZ; 2; 19†	5th	61

==== Italian GT Endurance Championship ====
(key) (Races in bold indicate pole position) (Races in italics indicate fastest lap)

Year	Team	Class	Car	1	2	3	4	Pos.	Points
2024	Lazarus Corse	GT3	Aston Martin Vantage AMR GT3 Evo	VAL; 14	MUG; 11	IMO; Ret	MNZ	20th	0
2026	BMW Italia Ceccato Racing	GT3	BMW M4 GT3 Evo	MIS	MNZ	IMO	MNZ	*	*

* Season still in progress.
