= 2017 Formula STCC Nordic =

The 2017 Formula STCC Nordic season was the fifth season of the single seater championship that supports 2017 Scandinavian Touring Car Championship season. Previously it went under the name of Formula Renault 1.6 Nordic but the name was changed after Renault Sport dropped its support for the 3.5 and 1.6 classes in late 2015. The season began on 4 May at Ring Knutstorp and concluded on 16 September at Mantorp Park after seven rounds.

== Drivers and teams ==
Team	No	Drivers	Rounds
(Norway) Emil Heyerdahl Racing Team	11	(Norway) Emil Heyerdahl	All
(Finland) Kart in Club Driving Academy	15	(Finland) Mi Maijala	1–6
(Finland) Kart in Club Driving Academy	22	(Finland) William Alatalo	All
(Finland) Kart in Club Driving Academy	33	(Finland) Jesse Salmenautio	1–6
(Finland) Kart in Club Driving Academy	77	(Finland) Konsta Lappalainen	All
(Sweden) MK Scandia	25	(Sweden) Jacob Palm	All
(Sweden) Trojnar Racing	27	(Sweden) Edward Jonasson	All
(Sweden) Ward WestCoast Racing Junior Team	30	(Sweden) Phillip Hall	All
(Sweden) Ward WestCoast Racing Junior Team	69	(Sweden) Hugo Nerman	All
(Sweden) Lyran Racing	44	(Sweden) Rasmus Ericsson	1
(Sweden) Andersson Racing	80	(Sweden) Jonathan Andersson	4

== Race calendar and results ==
The season started on 4 May at Ring Knutstorp and finished on 16 September at Mantorp Park, with six of the seven scheduled double-header rounds supporting STCC. Rounds denoted with a blue background were part of the Formula STCC NEZ Championship.

Round		Circuit	Date	Pole position	Fastest lap	Winning driver
1	R1	(Sweden) Ring Knutstorp, Kågeröd	5 May	(Sweden) Hugo Nerman	(Sweden) Edward Jonasson	(Sweden) Hugo Nerman
1	R2	(Sweden) Ring Knutstorp, Kågeröd	6 May	(Sweden) Hugo Nerman	(Sweden) Hugo Nerman	(Sweden) Hugo Nerman
2	R1	(Finland) Alastaro Circuit, Alastaro	20 May	(Sweden) Hugo Nerman	(Sweden) Hugo Nerman	(Sweden) Hugo Nerman
2	R2	(Finland) Alastaro Circuit, Alastaro	20 May	(Sweden) Hugo Nerman	(Sweden) Phillip Hall	(Sweden) Hugo Nerman
3	R1	(Norway) Rudskogen, Rakkestad	3 June	(Sweden) Hugo Nerman	(Sweden) Hugo Nerman	(Sweden) Hugo Nerman
3	R2	(Norway) Rudskogen, Rakkestad	4 June	(Sweden) Hugo Nerman	(Sweden) Hugo Nerman	(Sweden) Hugo Nerman
4	R1	(Sweden) Falkenbergs Motorbana, Bergagård	8 July	(Finland) Konsta Lappalainen	(Finland) Jesse Salmenautio	(Finland) Konsta Lappalainen
4	R2	(Sweden) Falkenbergs Motorbana, Bergagård	9 July	(Finland) Konsta Lappalainen	(Finland) Konsta Lappalainen	(Finland) Konsta Lappalainen
5	R1	(Sweden) Karlskoga Motorstadion, Karlskoga	12 August	(Sweden) Hugo Nerman	(Sweden) Edward Jonasson	(Sweden) Hugo Nerman
5	R2	(Sweden) Karlskoga Motorstadion, Karlskoga	13 August	(Sweden) Hugo Nerman	(Sweden) Hugo Nerman	(Sweden) Hugo Nerman
6	R1	(Sweden) Anderstorp Raceway, Anderstorp	2 September	(Sweden) Hugo Nerman (Note: Hugo Nerman qualified on pole for race 1 based on 2nd fastest qualifying lap, but was handed a 5-place grid penalty. Konsta Lappalainen effectively started on pole, but Nerman was not stripped from the pole point.)	(Sweden) Hugo Nerman	(Sweden) Hugo Nerman
6	R2	(Sweden) Anderstorp Raceway, Anderstorp	3 September	(Sweden) Hugo Nerman	(Finland) William Alatalo	(Finland) William Alatalo
7	R1	(Sweden) Mantorp Park, Mantorp	15 September	(Sweden) Hugo Nerman	(Sweden) Hugo Nerman	(Sweden) Hugo Nerman
7	R2	(Sweden) Mantorp Park, Mantorp	16 September	(Sweden) Hugo Nerman	(Sweden) Hugo Nerman	(Sweden) Hugo Nerman

== Championship standings ==
Points system

Points are awarded to the top 10 classified finishers. An extra point is awarded for pole position and fastest lap for each race.

Position	**1st**	**2nd**	**3rd**	**4th**	**5th**	**6th**	**7th**	**8th**	**9th**	**10th**	**Pole**	**FL**
Points	25	18	15	12	10	8	6	4	2	1	1	1

Parallel to the main championship, two other championships are held: the Formula STCC Junior Svenskt Mästerskap (JSM) for drivers under 26 years old holding a Swedish driver license, and the Formula STCC Northern European Zone (NEZ) championship at selected rounds. Points to these championships are awarded using the same system, with the sole exception of pole position and fastest lap not awarding points.

=== Formula STCC Drivers' Championship ===
Pos	Driver	KNU		ALA		RUD		FAL		KAR		AND		MAN		Pts
1	(Sweden) Hugo Nerman	**1**	**1**	**1**	**1**	**1**	**1**	2	2	**1**	**1**	**1**	**3**	**1**	**1**	346
2	(Finland) Konsta Lappalainen	4	3	3	3	4	2	**1**	**1**	4	3	3	2	4	5	222
3	(Sweden) Philip Hall	2	2	2	2	2	9	3	Ret	8	2	2	4	2	4	190
4	(Sweden) Edward Jonasson	3	5	5	DNS	6	6	6	3	3	4	5	5	3	2	156
5	(Finland) William Alatalo	8	9	4	DNS	3	4	5	Ret	2	5	6	1	5	3	142
6	(Norway) Emil Heyerdahl	9	EX	8	6	5	3	8	4	6	7	8	8	6	6	93
7	(Finland) Jesse Salmenautio	7	8	7	4	7	5	4	Ret	Ret	6	4	6			85
8	(Finland) Mi Maijala	6	6	6	5	8	7	7	6	5	8	7	9			80
9	(Sweden) Jacob Palm	10	7	DNS	DNS	9	8	10	Ret	7	9	Ret	7	Ret	7	34
10	(Sweden) Rasmus Ericsson	5	4													22
11	(Sweden) Jonathan Andersson							9	5							12
Pos	Driver	KNU		ALA		RUD		FAL		KAR		AND		MAN		Pts

Colour	Result
Gold	Winner
Silver	Second place
Bronze	Third place
Green	Points classification
Blue	Non-points classification
Blue	Non-classified finish (NC)
Purple	Retired, not classified (Ret)
Red	Did not qualify (DNQ)
Red	Did not pre-qualify (DNPQ)
Black	Disqualified (DSQ)
White	Did not start (DNS)
White	Withdrew (WD)
White	Race cancelled (C)
Blank	Did not practice (DNP)
Blank	Did not arrive (DNA)
Blank	Excluded (EX)

**Bold** – Pole
Italics – Fastest Lap

=== Formula STCC Junior Svenskt Mästerskap ===
Pos	Driver	KNU		ALA		RUD		FAL		KAR		AND		MAN		Pts
1	(Sweden) Hugo Nerman	1	1	1	1	1	1	2	2	1	1	1	3	1	1	350
2	(Sweden) Phillip Hall	2	2	2	2	2	9	3	Ret	8	2	2	4	2	4	219
3	(Sweden) Edward Jonasson	3	5	5	DNS	6	6	6	3	3	4	5	5	3	2	204
4	(Sweden) Jacob Palm	10	7	DNS	DNS	9	8	10	Ret	7	9	Ret	7	Ret	7	108
5	(Sweden) Rasmus Ericsson	5	4													27
6	(Sweden) Jonathan Andersson							9	5							27
Pos	Driver	KNU		ALA		RUD		FAL		KAR		AND		MAN		Pts

=== Formula STCC NEZ Championship ===
Pos	Driver	ALA		RUD		AND		Pts
1	(Sweden) Hugo Nerman	**1**	**1**	**1**	**1**	**1**	**3**	140
2	(Finland) Konsta Lappalainen	3	3	4	2	3	2	93
3	(Sweden) Phillip Hall	2	2	2	9	2	4	86
4	(Finland) William Alatalo	4	DNS	3	4	6	1	72
5	(Finland) Jesse Salmenautio	7	4	7	5	4	6	54
6	(Sweden) Edward Jonasson	5	DNS	6	6	5	5	46
7	(Norway) Emil Heyerdahl	8	6	5	3	8	8	45
8	(Finland) Mi Maijala	6	5	8	7	7	9	36
9	(Sweden) Jacob Palm	DNS	DNS	9	8	Ret	7	12
Pos	Driver	ALA		RUD		AND		Pts
