= KIC Motorsport =

Motorsport Team From Finland

(Finland) KIC Motorsport
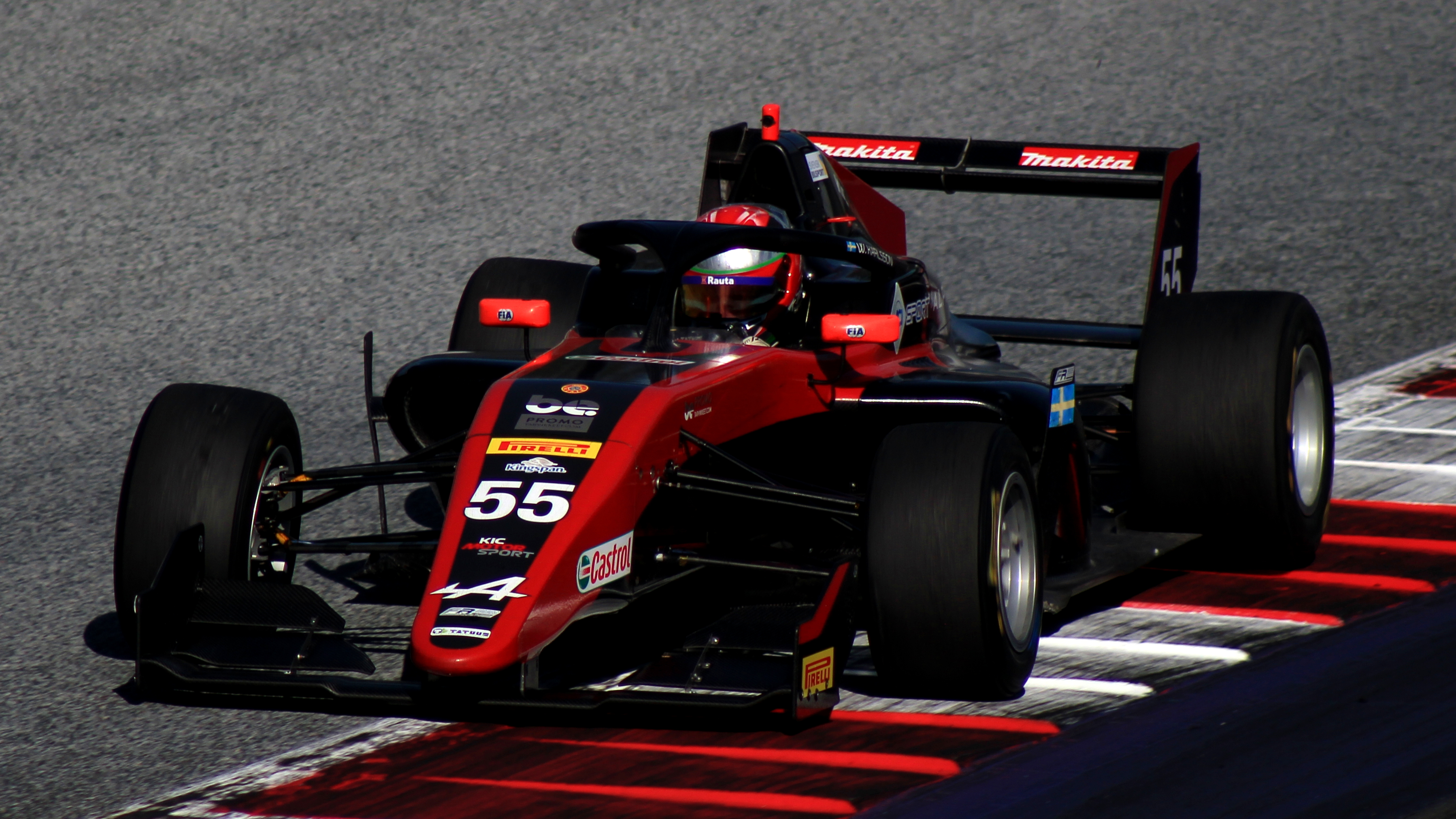
- Founder(s): Petri Lappalainen
- Team principal(s): Petri Lappalainen; Peter Flythström
- Former series: Formula Regional European Championship; F4 Spanish Championship; SMP F4 Championship; ADAC Formula 4 Formula STCC Nordic; Scandinavian Touring Car Championship
- Drivers' Championships: Formula Renault 1.6 Nordic: 2014: Joonas Lappalainen; SMP F4 Championship: 2018: Konsta Lappalainen
- Website: https://www.kicmotorsport.com/

KIC Motorsport (also known as Kart in Club Driving Academy) is a Finnish auto racing team, which last competed in the Formula Regional European Championship.

== History ==
In 2017 the Kart in Club Driving Academy competed in the TCR Scandinavia Touring Car Championship with an Audi RS 3 LMS TCR driven by Joonas Lappalainen. In October that year the team also made its debut in the fifth round of the F4 Spanish Championship held at Circuito de Navarra. The team fielded the Finnish trio Juuso Puhakka, Jesse Salmenautio and Konsta Lappalainen.

In 2019 the KIC Motorsport team, led by Petri Lappalainen, joined the newly established Formula Regional European Championship with Isac Blomqvist and Petri's son Konsta Lappalainen, who was also the 2018 SMP F4 champion. Throughout the season Blomqvist claimed two pole positions, but then left the team following the Imola round. At Mugello the team was then joined by the FIA F3 experienced Jake Hughes.

For the 2020 Formula Regional European Championship the team was joined by Patrik Pasma, while Konsta Lappalainen remained with the team. After travel restrictions prevented Jüri Vips from partaking in the 2020 Super Formula Championship, he also joined KIC Motorsport's lineup. In the Monza round Patrik Pasma took the teams maiden win in the championship. Pasma ultimately finished fourth in the drivers' championship while the team took second place in the teams' championship.

For the 2021 Formula Regional European Championship the team was joined by Nico Göhler, who had already competed with the team for two rounds in 2020. The teams driver lineup was completed by the Finns Patrik Pasma and Elias Seppänen. Following Pasma's switch to ART Grand Prix in the middle of the season, they were joined by Jasin Ferati, who moved over from Monolite Racing. The team was also later joined the reigning FREC champion Gianluca Petecof. After Ferati sustained an injury, Konsta Lappalainen returned to the team as a guest driver in the season finale.

For the 2022 Formula Regional European Championship the team was joined by Francesco Braschi and Santiago Ramos. Russian driver Kirill Smal was also expected to join the team, but ultimately did not compete following the Russian invasion of Ukraine. Instead the team was joined by Piotr Wiśnicki. Throughout the season the team was also joined by Patrik Pasma, Sebastian Øgaard and William Alatalo.

Ahead of the 2023 Formula Regional European Championship it was announced that Ferrari Driver Academy driver Maya Weug would join the team. The team then also announced Iker Oikarinen and Shannon Lugassy as drivers. However Oikarinen's seat was ultimately taken by Oleksandr Partyshev. Throughout the season Weug was the team's sole points scorer following a pointless 2022 season.

For the 2024 Formula Regional European Championship the KIC Motorsport team entered a technical partnership with Evans GP. The teams lineup consisted of Costa Toparis, Nandhavud Bhirombhakdi and Alex Sawer.

== Former series results ==
=== Formula Regional European Championship ===
Year	Car	Drivers	Races	Wins	Poles	F/Laps	Podiums	Points	D.C.	T.C.
2019	Tatuus F3 T-318-Alfa Romeo	(Finland) Isac Blomqvist	15	0	2	0	1	62	10th	5th
2019	Tatuus F3 T-318-Alfa Romeo	(Finland) Konsta Lappalainen	23	0	0	0	1	56	11th	5th
2019	Tatuus F3 T-318-Alfa Romeo	(United Kingdom) Jake Hughes	3	0	0	1	3	45	12th	5th
2019	Tatuus F3 T-318-Alfa Romeo	(Finland) Niko Kari	3	0	0	0	0	26	15th	5th
2020	Tatuus F3 T-318-Alfa Romeo	(Finland) Patrik Pasma	23	4	2	3	6	290	4th	2nd
2020	Tatuus F3 T-318-Alfa Romeo	(Finland) Konsta Lappalainen	22	0	0	1	2	140	6th	2nd
2020	Tatuus F3 T-318-Alfa Romeo	(Estonia) Jüri Vips	9	0	0	3	3	81	8th	2nd
2020	Tatuus F3 T-318-Alfa Romeo	(Germany) Nico Göhler	5	0	0	0	0	12	16th	2nd
2020	Tatuus F3 T-318-Alfa Romeo	(Italy) Nicola Marinangeli	5	0	0	0	0	6	17th	2nd
2021	Tatuus F3 T-318-Alpine	(Finland) Patrik Pasma†	20	0	0	0	0	56	12th	9th
2021	Tatuus F3 T-318-Alpine	(Brazil) Gianluca Petecof	8	0	0	0	0	5	22nd	9th
2021	Tatuus F3 T-318-Alpine	(Finland) Elias Seppänen	14	0	0	0	0	1	24th	9th
2021	Tatuus F3 T-318-Alpine	(Germany) Nico Göhler	19	0	0	0	0	0	34th	9th
2021	Tatuus F3 T-318-Alpine	(Switzerland) Jasin Ferati†	13	0	0	0	0	0	35th	9th
2021	Tatuus F3 T-318-Alpine	(Finland) Konsta Lappalainen	2	0	0	0	0	0	NC	9th
2022	Tatuus F3 T-318-Alpine	(Italy) Francesco Braschi†	19	0	0	0	0	1	26th	11th
2022	Tatuus F3 T-318-Alpine	(Mexico) Santiago Ramos†	19	0	0	0	0	0	27th	11th
2022	Tatuus F3 T-318-Alpine	(Poland) Piotr Wiśnicki	17	0	0	0	0	0	35th	11th
2022	Tatuus F3 T-318-Alpine	(Finland) Patrik Pasma	2	0	0	0	0	0	36th	11th
2022	Tatuus F3 T-318-Alpine	(Finland) William Alatalo	2	0	0	0	0	0	NC	11th
2022	Tatuus F3 T-318-Alpine	(Denmark) Sebastian Øgaard	6	0	0	0	0	0	NC	11th
2023	Tatuus F3 T-318-Alpine	(Netherlands) Maya Weug	20	0	0	0	0	27	17th	11th
2023	Tatuus F3 T-318-Alpine	(Ukraine) Oleksandr Partyshev	8	0	0	0	0	0	33rd	11th
2023	Tatuus F3 T-318-Alpine	(Finland) Konsta Lappalainen	2	0	0	0	0	0	36th	11th
2023	Tatuus F3 T-318-Alpine	(Switzerland) Shannon Lugassy	2	0	0	0	0	0	39th	11th
2023	Tatuus F3 T-318-Alpine	(Sweden) William Karlsson	4	0	0	0	0	0	40th	11th
2023	Tatuus F3 T-318-Alpine	(Ukraine) Ivan Klymenko	9	0	0	0	0	0	41st	11th
2024	Tatuus F3 T-318-Alpine	(Thailand) Nandhavud Bhirombhakdi	20	0	0	0	0	0	26th	10th
2024	Tatuus F3 T-318-Alpine	(Netherlands) Maya Weug	2	0	0	0	0	0	29th	10th
2024	Tatuus F3 T-318-Alpine	(United Kingdom) John Bennett	2	0	0	0	0	0	30th	10th
2024	Tatuus F3 T-318-Alpine	(Vietnam) Alex Sawer	16	0	0	0	0	0	32nd	10th
2024	Tatuus F3 T-318-Alpine	(Australia) Costa Toparis	4	0	0	0	0	0	34th	10th
2024	Tatuus F3 T-318-Alpine	(Italy) Enzo Scionti	2	0	0	0	0	0	39th	10th
2024	Tatuus F3 T-318-Alpine	(China) Gao Yujia	6	0	0	0	0	0	40th	10th

† Shared results with other teams.

=== Formula Renault 1.6 Nordic / Formula STCC Nordic ===
Year	Car	Drivers	Races	Wins	Poles	F/Laps	Podiums	Points	D.C.
2014	Signatech FR1.6	(Finland) Joonas Lappalainen	16	4	7	5	9	235	1st
2014	Signatech FR1.6	(Finland) Ilmari Korpivaara	16	0	0	0	2	129	7th
2015	Signatech FR1.6	(Finland) Ilmari Korpivaara	15	3	5	4	12	258	2nd
2015	Signatech FR1.6	(Finland) Juuso Puhakka	15	2	1	1	6	195	3rd
2016	Signatech FR1.6	(Finland) Juuso Puhakka	14	3	6	3	9	214	2nd
2016	Signatech FR1.6	(Finland) Konsta Lappalainen	2	0	0	0	0	12	10th
2017	Signatech FR1.6	(Finland) Konsta Lappalainen	14	2	2	1	9	222	2nd
2017	Signatech FR1.6	(Finland) William Alatalo	13	1	0	1	4	142	5th
2017	Signatech FR1.6	(Finland) Jesse Salmenautio	12	0	0	1	0	85	7th
2017	Signatech FR1.6	(Finland) Mi Maijala	12	0	0	0	0	80	8th

=== F4 Spanish Chamionship ===
Year	Car	Drivers	Races	Wins	Poles	F/Laps	Podiums	Points	D.C.	T.C.
2017	Tatuus F4-T014	(Finland) Konsta Lappalainen†	12	0	0	0	0	16	13th	5th
2017	Tatuus F4-T014	(Finland) Juuso Puhakka‡	6	0	0	0	0	11	14th	5th
2017	Tatuus F4-T014	(Finland) Jesse Salmenautio	6	0	0	0	0	1	18th	5th

† Lappalainen drove for SMP Racing in round 4.

‡ Puhakka drove for SMP Racing in round 1.

=== TCR Scandinavia Touring Car Championship ===
Year	Car	Drivers	Races	Wins	Poles	F/Laps	Podiums	Points	D.C.	T.C.
2017	Audi RS 3 LMS TCR	(Finland) Joonas Lappalainen	15	0	0	1	1	100	8th	5th

=== SMP F4 Championship ===
Year	Car	Drivers	Races	Wins	Poles	F/Laps	Podiums	Points	D.C.
2017	Tatuus F4-T014	(Finland) Juuso Puhakka	21	1	0	3	4	136	7th
2017	Tatuus F4-T014	(Finland) Konsta Lappalainen	3	0	0	0	1	16	15th
2018	Tatuus F4-T014	(Finland) Konsta Lappalainen	21	7	4	3	15	316	1st
2018	Tatuus F4-T014	(Finland) Jesse Salmenautio	21	0	0	0	4	188	5th

=== ADAC Formula 4 ===
Year	Car	Drivers	Races	Wins	Poles	F/Laps	Podiums	Points	D.C.	T.C.
2018	Tatuus F4-T014	(Finland) Konsta Lappalainen	11	0	0	0	0	19	15th	6th
2018	Tatuus F4-T014	(Finland) Jesse Salmenautio	4	0	0	0	0	0	NC	6th

== Timeline ==
Former series
Formula STCC Nordic	2014–2017
F4 Spanish Championship	2017
TCR Scandinavia Touring Car Championship	2017
SMP F4 Championship	2017–2018
ADAC Formula 4	2018
Formula Regional European Championship	2019–2024
