= 2018 SMP F4 Championship =

Motor racing competition

The 2018 SMP F4 Championship was the fourth season of the SMP F4 Championship. The series is also known as the FIA North-European Zone (NEZ) championship. Koiranen GP, despite creating Formula Academy Finland, continued as the promoter. The season started in Smolensk Ring on 5 May and finished in Assen Circuit on 21 October.

Champion Konsta Lappalainen won seven races, with runner-up Michael Belov and third-placed Isac Blomqvist taking five and three victories respectively.

== Drivers ==
Team	No.	Driver	Rounds
(Netherlands) MP Motorsport	1	(Netherlands) Freek Schothorst	1
(Netherlands) MP Motorsport	12	(Finland) Patrick Schott (Note: Schott and Cordeel competed under a Finnish racing license in order to be eligible for points.)	1–4
(Netherlands) MP Motorsport	52	(Hungary) László Tóth	7
(Netherlands) MP Motorsport	64	(Sweden) Isac Blomqvist	All
(Netherlands) MP Motorsport	888	(Finland) Amaury Cordeel	3–5, 7
(Russia) SMP Racing	2	(Russia) Pavel Bulantsev	All
(Russia) SMP Racing	7	(Russia) Nikita Volegov	2
(Russia) SMP Racing	11	(Russia) Aleksandr Vilaev	All
(Russia) SMP Racing	16	(Russia) Nikita Aleksandrov	All
(Russia) SMP Racing	20	(Russia) Ivan Berets	All
(Russia) SMP Racing	21	(Russia) Artem Lobanenko	All
(Russia) SMP Racing	27	(Russia) Ivan Shvetsov	All
(Russia) SMP Racing	41	(Russia) Aleksandr Vartanyan	3
(Russia) SMP Racing	41	(Russia) Denis Bulatov	4
(Russia) SMP Racing	41	(Russia) Irina Sidorkova	7
(Russia) SMP Racing	57	(Russia) Michael Belov	All
(Finland) Formula Academy	3	(Denmark) Noah Watt	7
(Finland) Kart In Club Driving Academy	10	(Finland) Konsta Lappalainen	All
(Finland) Kart In Club Driving Academy	69	(Finland) Jesse Salmenautio	All
(Finland) Jimi Hannus Racing	12	(Finland) Jimi Hannus	6
(Finland) Koiranen GP	32	(Finland) Tuomas Haapalainen	3–5
(Finland) Koiranen GP	32	(Finland) Mi Maijala	6
(Finland) Koiranen GP	56	(Finland) Markus Laitala	3–6

== Race calendar ==
On 27 April 2018 the calendar was announced. For the first time of the existence of the championship Sochi Autodrom hadn't received a slot in the schedule. Circuit Zandvoort was replaced with a round at the Assen Circuit, whilst Autodrom Moscow and NRING Circuit were included to the calendar for the first time. Round 6 was originally scheduled to be held at Auto24ring on 15–16 September, but was rescheduled to take place at Alastaro Circuit on 22–23 September.

Round		Circuit	Date	Pole position	Fastest lap	Winning driver	Winning team	Supporting
1	R1	(Russia) Smolensk Ring, Verhnedneprovsky	5 May	(Sweden) Isac Blomqvist	(Sweden) Isac Blomqvist	(Sweden) Isac Blomqvist	(Netherlands) MP Motorsport	2018 Russian Circuit Racing Series
1	R2	(Russia) Smolensk Ring, Verhnedneprovsky	5 May		(Finland) Konsta Lappalainen	(Sweden) Isac Blomqvist	(Netherlands) MP Motorsport	2018 Russian Circuit Racing Series
1	R3	(Russia) Smolensk Ring, Verhnedneprovsky	6 May	(Russia) Ivan Berets	(Netherlands) Freek Schothorst	(Russia) Ivan Berets	(Russia) SMP Racing	2018 Russian Circuit Racing Series
2	R4	(Russia) NRING Circuit, Bogorodsk	2 June	(Finland) Konsta Lappalainen	(Russia) Michael Belov	(Russia) Michael Belov	(Russia) SMP Racing	2018 Russian Circuit Racing Series
2	R5	(Russia) NRING Circuit, Bogorodsk	2 June		(Sweden) Isac Blomqvist	(Russia) Pavel Bulantsev	(Russia) SMP Racing	2018 Russian Circuit Racing Series
2	R6	(Russia) NRING Circuit, Bogorodsk	3 June	(Russia) Michael Belov	(Russia) Michael Belov	(Russia) Michael Belov	(Russia) SMP Racing	2018 Russian Circuit Racing Series
3	R7	(Russia) Moscow Raceway, Volokolamsk	11 August	(Finland) Konsta Lappalainen	(Finland) Tuomas Haapalainen	(Finland) Konsta Lappalainen	(Finland) Kart In Club Driving Academy	2018 Russian Circuit Racing Series
3	R8	(Russia) Moscow Raceway, Volokolamsk	11 August		(Sweden) Isac Blomqvist	(Sweden) Isac Blomqvist	(Netherlands) MP Motorsport	2018 Russian Circuit Racing Series
3	R9	(Russia) Moscow Raceway, Volokolamsk	12 August	(Finland) Konsta Lappalainen	(Russia) Aleksandr Vartanyan	(Finland) Konsta Lappalainen	(Finland) Kart In Club Driving Academy	2018 Russian Circuit Racing Series
4	R10	(Russia) Autodrom Moscow, Myachkovo Airport	18 August	(Finland) Konsta Lappalainen	(Finland) Konsta Lappalainen	(Finland) Konsta Lappalainen	(Finland) Kart In Club Driving Academy	Mitjet Russian Cup IV
4	R11	(Russia) Autodrom Moscow, Myachkovo Airport	18 August		(Finland) Konsta Lappalainen	(Finland) Konsta Lappalainen	(Finland) Kart In Club Driving Academy	Mitjet Russian Cup IV
4	R12	(Russia) Autodrom Moscow, Myachkovo Airport	19 August	(Finland) Amaury Cordeel	(Finland) Amaury Cordeel	(Finland) Amaury Cordeel	(Netherlands) MP Motorsport	Mitjet Russian Cup IV
5	R13	(Finland) Ahvenisto Race Circuit, Hämeenlinna	1 September	(Russia) Michael Belov	(Finland) Konsta Lappalainen	(Finland) Konsta Lappalainen	(Finland) Kart In Club Driving Academy	Rata-SM
5	R14	(Finland) Ahvenisto Race Circuit, Hämeenlinna	1 September		(Russia) Pavel Bulantsev	(Finland) Tuomas Haapalainen	(Finland) Koiranen GP	Rata-SM
5	R15	(Finland) Ahvenisto Race Circuit, Hämeenlinna	2 September	(Russia) Michael Belov	(Russia) Michael Belov	(Russia) Michael Belov	(Russia) SMP Racing	Rata-SM
6	R16	(Finland) Alastaro Circuit, Loimaa	22 September	(Russia) Pavel Bulantsev	(Russia) Michael Belov	(Finland) Konsta Lappalainen	(Finland) Kart In Club Driving Academy	Rata-SM
6	R17	(Finland) Alastaro Circuit, Loimaa	22 September		(Russia) Ivan Berets	(Russia) Michael Belov	(Russia) SMP Racing	Rata-SM
6	R18	(Finland) Alastaro Circuit, Loimaa	23 September	(Russia) Michael Belov	(Russia) Michael Belov	(Finland) Konsta Lappalainen	(Finland) Kart In Club Driving Academy	Rata-SM
7	R19	(Netherlands) Assen Circuit, Assen	20 October	(Russia) Ivan Berets	(Russia) Michael Belov	(Russia) Michael Belov	(Russia) SMP Racing	Hankook Finaleraces
7	R20	(Netherlands) Assen Circuit, Assen	20 October		(Finland) Amaury Cordeel	(Finland) Amaury Cordeel	(Netherlands) MP Motorsport	Hankook Finaleraces
7	R21	(Netherlands) Assen Circuit, Assen	21 October	(Russia) Ivan Berets	(Russia) Michael Belov	(Russia) Ivan Berets	(Russia) SMP Racing	Hankook Finaleraces

== Championship standings ==
Points were awarded to the top 10 classified finishers in each race. No points were awarded for pole position or fastest lap.

Races	Position, points per race									
Races	**1st**	**2nd**	**3rd**	**4th**	**5th**	**6th**	**7th**	**8th**	**9th**	**10th**
Races 1 & 3	25	18	15	12	10	8	6	4	2	1
Race 2	15	12	10	8	6	4	2	1		

=== Drivers' championship ===
Pos	Driver	SMO (Russia)			NRG (Russia)			MSC (Russia)			ADM (Russia)			AHV (Finland)			ALA (Finland)			ASS (Netherlands)			Pts
1	(Finland) Konsta Lappalainen	6	2	2	**5**	**Ret**	5	**1**	**3**	**1**	**1**	**1**	2	1	4	3	1	2	1	Ret	2	2	316
2	(Russia) Michael Belov	5	4	4	1	Ret	**1**	4	7	7	3	2	3	**2**	**5**	**1**	2	**1**	**2**	1	**4**	Ret	275
3	(Sweden) Isac Blomqvist	**1**	1	5	2	2	2	DSQ	1	3	6	7	5	Ret	7	5	7	3	Ret	3	Ret	5	201
4	(Russia) Ivan Berets	2	**12**	**1**	4	5	6	3	6	5	9	9	6	Ret	6	6	3	6	3	**7**	3	**1**	195
5	(Finland) Jesse Salmenautio	4	3	6	Ret	6	7	5	5	8	2	4	4	4	2	2	6	4	4	4	5	9	188
6	(Russia) Ivan Shvetsov	7	7	Ret	3	3	4	7	8	4	8	8	7	7	10	7	4	5	5	6	7	6	133
7	(Russia) Pavel Bulantsev	9	6	8	6	1	3	8	DNS	10	5	5	8	3	3	8	**5**	Ret	Ret	8	6	4	132
8	(Finland) Amaury Cordeel							6	9	6	4	6	**1**	Ret	9	9				2	1	3	107
9	(Finland) Tuomas Haapalainen							14	4	2	7	3	10	8	1	4							74
10	(Netherlands) Freek Schothorst	3	5	3																			36
11	(Russia) Aleksandr Vartanyan							2	2	9													32
12	(Finland) Patrick Schott	8	8	7	7	4	9	9	12	11	12	11	9										31
13	(Russia) Artem Lobanenko	10	9	9	9	9	8	10	10	13	Ret	14	Ret	10†	Ret	10	9	10	6	9	9	12	24
14	(Finland) Markus Laitala							12	11	12	11	13	12	5	8	13	8	7	7				23
15	(Russia) Aleksandr Vilaev	12	10	10	11	10	11	13	14	15	Ret	12	11	6	11	11	12	8	8	10	10	8	19
16	(Denmark) Noah Watt																			5	8	7	17
17	(Russia) Nikita Aleksandrov	11	11	11	10	7	10	11	13	14	Ret	15	Ret	9	12	12	13	11	9	11	12	10	9
18	(Russia) Nikita Volegov				8	8	Ret																5
19	(Finland) Mi Maijala																10	12	10				2
20	(Russia) Denis Bulatov										10	10	DNS										1
21	(Finland) Jimi Hannus																11	9	11				0
22	(Hungary) László Tóth																			12	11	11	0
23	(Russia) Irina Sidorkova																			13	13	13	0
Pos	Driver	SMO (Russia)			NRG (Russia)			MSC (Russia)			ADM (Russia)			AHV (Finland)			ALA (Finland)			ASS (Netherlands)			Pts

Colour	Result
Gold	Winner
Silver	Second place
Bronze	Third place
Green	Points classification
Blue	Non-points classification
Blue	Non-classified finish (NC)
Purple	Retired, not classified (Ret)
Red	Did not qualify (DNQ)
Red	Did not pre-qualify (DNPQ)
Black	Disqualified (DSQ)
White	Did not start (DNS)
White	Withdrew (WD)
White	Race cancelled (C)
Blank	Did not practice (DNP)
Blank	Did not arrive (DNA)
Blank	Excluded (EX)

**Bold** – Pole
Italics – Fastest Lap

Notes:

- † — Drivers did not finish the race, but were classified as they completed over 75% of the race distance.
