= 2026 Italian GT Championship Endurance Cup =

Motorsport season

The 2026 Italian GT Championship Endurance Cup was the thirty-fifth season of the Italian GT Championship. The season began on 8 May at Misano World Circuit and finished on 1 November at Mugello Circuit. The races were contested with GT3-spec cars, and GT Cup-spec cars in two different divisions, Division 1 for Ferrari Challenge (296) and Lamborghini Super Trofeo cars and Division 2 for Ferrari Challenge (488) and Porsche Carrera Cup cars.

== Calendar ==
Round	Circuit	Date	Map
1	Misano World Circuit, Misano Adriatico, Emilia-Romagna	8–10 May	2026 Italian GT Championship Endurance Cup is located in Italy
2	Autodromo Nazionale Monza, Monza, Lombardy	19–21 June	2026 Italian GT Championship Endurance Cup is located in Italy
3	Autodromo Internazionale Enzo e Dino Ferrari, Imola, Emilia-Romagna	4–6 September	2026 Italian GT Championship Endurance Cup is located in Italy
4	Autodromo Internazionale del Mugello, Mugello, Tuscany	30 October–1 November	2026 Italian GT Championship Endurance Cup is located in Italy

== Entry list ==
Team	Car	Engine	No.	Drivers	Class	Rounds
GT3
(France) CSA Racing	McLaren 720S GT3 Evo	McLaren M840T 4.0 L Turbo V8	1	(India) Sai Sanjay	P	1–3
(France) CSA Racing	McLaren 720S GT3 Evo	McLaren M840T 4.0 L Turbo V8	1	(Belgium) Baptiste Moulin	P	1–2
(France) CSA Racing	McLaren 720S GT3 Evo	McLaren M840T 4.0 L Turbo V8	1	(France) Arthur Rougier	P	1–2
(France) CSA Racing	McLaren 720S GT3 Evo	McLaren M840T 4.0 L Turbo V8	1	(France) Simon Gachet	P	3
(France) CSA Racing	McLaren 720S GT3 Evo	McLaren M840T 4.0 L Turbo V8	1	(France) Luciano Morano	P	3
(France) CSA Racing	McLaren 720S GT3 Evo	McLaren M840T 4.0 L Turbo V8	5	(France) Simon Gachet	P	1–2
(France) CSA Racing	McLaren 720S GT3 Evo	McLaren M840T 4.0 L Turbo V8	5	(France) Luciano Morano	P	1–2
(France) CSA Racing	McLaren 720S GT3 Evo	McLaren M840T 4.0 L Turbo V8	5	(Italy) Alessio Deledda	P	1–2
(Italy) Easy Race	Ferrari 296 GT3	Ferrari F163CE 3.0 L Turbo V6	3	(Italy) Luigi Coluccio	PA	All
(Italy) Easy Race	Ferrari 296 GT3	Ferrari F163CE 3.0 L Turbo V6	3	(Italy) Mattia Marchiante	PA	All
(Italy) Easy Race	Ferrari 296 GT3	Ferrari F163CE 3.0 L Turbo V6	3	(Italy) Carlo Tamburini	PA	All
(Italy) Easy Race	Ferrari 296 GT3	Ferrari F163CE 3.0 L Turbo V6	26	(Italy) Leonardo Gorini	Am	All
(Italy) Easy Race	Ferrari 296 GT3	Ferrari F163CE 3.0 L Turbo V6	26	(Italy) Massimo Perrina	Am	All
(Italy) Easy Race	Ferrari 296 GT3	Ferrari F163CE 3.0 L Turbo V6	26	(Italy) Daniel Mancinelli	Am	1, 3–4
(Italy) Easy Race	Ferrari 296 GT3	Ferrari F163CE 3.0 L Turbo V6	26	(Italy) Luca Ghiotto	Am	2
(Slovakia) ARC Bratislava	Lamborghini Huracán GT3 Evo 2	Lamborghini DGF 5.2 L V10	4	(Slovakia) Adam Konôpka	Am	4
(Slovakia) ARC Bratislava	Lamborghini Huracán GT3 Evo 2	Lamborghini DGF 5.2 L V10	4	(Slovakia) Miro Konôpka	Am	4
(Slovakia) ARC Bratislava	Lamborghini Huracán GT3 Evo 2	Lamborghini DGF 5.2 L V10	4	(Slovakia) Zdeno Mikulasko	Am	4
(Italy) BMW Italia Ceccato Racing	BMW M4 GT3 Evo	BMW P58 3.0 L Twin Turbo I6	7	(Finland) William Alatalo	P	All
(Italy) BMW Italia Ceccato Racing	BMW M4 GT3 Evo	BMW P58 3.0 L Twin Turbo I6	7	(Sweden) Alfred Nilsson	P	All
(Italy) BMW Italia Ceccato Racing	BMW M4 GT3 Evo	BMW P58 3.0 L Twin Turbo I6	7	(Romania) Filip Ugran	P	All
(Italy) BMW Italia Ceccato Racing	BMW M4 GT3 Evo	BMW P58 3.0 L Twin Turbo I6	8	(Italy) Filippo Barberi	PA	All
(Italy) BMW Italia Ceccato Racing	BMW M4 GT3 Evo	BMW P58 3.0 L Twin Turbo I6	8	(Italy) Jacopo Cimenes	PA	All
(Italy) BMW Italia Ceccato Racing	BMW M4 GT3 Evo	BMW P58 3.0 L Twin Turbo I6	8	(Italy) Riccardo Leone Cirelli	PA	All
(Germany) Tresor Attempto Racing	Audi R8 LMS Evo II	Audi DAR 5.2 L V10	9	(Italy) Marco Cassarà	PA	1
(Germany) Tresor Attempto Racing	Audi R8 LMS Evo II	Audi DAR 5.2 L V10	9	(Italy) Rocco Mazzola	PA	1
(Germany) Tresor Attempto Racing	Audi R8 LMS Evo II	Audi DAR 5.2 L V10	9	(Denmark) Sebastian Øgaard	PA	1
(Germany) Tresor Attempto Racing	Audi R8 LMS Evo II	Audi DAR 5.2 L V10	9	(Italy) Marco Cassarà	Am	2
(Germany) Tresor Attempto Racing	Audi R8 LMS Evo II	Audi DAR 5.2 L V10	9	(South Africa) Marius Jackson	Am	2
(Germany) Tresor Attempto Racing	Audi R8 LMS Evo II	Audi DAR 5.2 L V10	9	(Denmark) Sebastian Øgaard	Am	2
(Germany) Tresor Attempto Racing	Audi R8 LMS Evo II	Audi DAR 5.2 L V10	22	(Italy) Marco Cassarà	Am	3–4
(Germany) Tresor Attempto Racing	Audi R8 LMS Evo II	Audi DAR 5.2 L V10	22	(Denmark) Sebastian Øgaard	Am	3–4
(Germany) Tresor Attempto Racing	Audi R8 LMS Evo II	Audi DAR 5.2 L V10	22	(Italy) Vittorio Viglietti	Am	3–4
(Germany) Tresor Attempto Racing	Audi R8 LMS Evo II	Audi DAR 5.2 L V10	88	(Italy) Alberto Clementi Pisani	PA	1–2
(Germany) Tresor Attempto Racing	Audi R8 LMS Evo II	Audi DAR 5.2 L V10	88	(Italy) Alberto Di Folco	PA	1–2
(Germany) Tresor Attempto Racing	Audi R8 LMS Evo II	Audi DAR 5.2 L V10	88	(Italy) Vittorio Viglietti	PA	1–2
(Germany) Tresor Attempto Racing	Audi R8 LMS Evo II	Audi DAR 5.2 L V10	99	(Italy) Andrea Frassineti	P	All
(Germany) Tresor Attempto Racing	Audi R8 LMS Evo II	Audi DAR 5.2 L V10	99	(Israel) Ariel Levi	P	All
(Germany) Tresor Attempto Racing	Audi R8 LMS Evo II	Audi DAR 5.2 L V10	99	(Germany) Alex Aka	P	1, 3–4
(Germany) Tresor Attempto Racing	Audi R8 LMS Evo II	Audi DAR 5.2 L V10	99	(Italy) Rocco Mazzola	P	2
(Italy) / Nova Race Events (Note: Car No. 11 and No. 55 entered as Nova Race Events, and car No. 77 entered as FAEMS Team, which is operated by Nova Race Events.); (Italy) / FAEMS Team	BMW M4 GT3 Evo	BMW P58 3.0 L Twin Turbo I6	11	(Switzerland) Jasin Ferati	PA	All
(Italy) / Nova Race Events; (Italy) / FAEMS Team	BMW M4 GT3 Evo	BMW P58 3.0 L Twin Turbo I6	11	(Italy) Francesco Guerra	PA	All
(Italy) / Nova Race Events; (Italy) / FAEMS Team	BMW M4 GT3 Evo	BMW P58 3.0 L Twin Turbo I6	11	(Switzerland) Jean-Luc D'Auria	PA	1–3
(Italy) / Nova Race Events; (Italy) / FAEMS Team	BMW M4 GT3 Evo	BMW P58 3.0 L Twin Turbo I6	11	(Italy) Felice Jelmini	PA	4
(Italy) / Nova Race Events; (Italy) / FAEMS Team	BMW M4 GT3 Evo	BMW P58 3.0 L Twin Turbo I6	77	(Italy) Massimo Ciglia	Am	All
(Italy) / Nova Race Events; (Italy) / FAEMS Team	BMW M4 GT3 Evo	BMW P58 3.0 L Twin Turbo I6	77	(Italy) Jenny Sonzogni	Am	1–3
(Italy) / Nova Race Events; (Italy) / FAEMS Team	BMW M4 GT3 Evo	BMW P58 3.0 L Twin Turbo I6	77	(Italy) Alessandro Tarabini	Am	1
(Italy) / Nova Race Events; (Italy) / FAEMS Team	BMW M4 GT3 Evo	BMW P58 3.0 L Twin Turbo I6	77	(Italy) Rodolfo Massaro	Am	2–4
(Italy) / Nova Race Events; (Italy) / FAEMS Team	BMW M4 GT3 Evo	BMW P58 3.0 L Twin Turbo I6	77	(Italy) Alessandro Bracalente	Am	4
(Italy) / Nova Race Events; (Italy) / FAEMS Team	Honda NSX GT3 Evo25	Honda JNC1 3.5 L Twin Turbo V6	55	(Italy) Luca Magnoni	Am	1–2
(Italy) / Nova Race Events; (Italy) / FAEMS Team	Honda NSX GT3 Evo25	Honda JNC1 3.5 L Twin Turbo V6	55	(Italy) Alessandro Marchetti	Am	1–2
(Italy) / Nova Race Events; (Italy) / FAEMS Team	Honda NSX GT3 Evo25	Honda JNC1 3.5 L Twin Turbo V6	55	(Italy) Paolo Rocca	Am	1
(Italy) / Nova Race Events; (Italy) / FAEMS Team	Honda NSX GT3 Evo25	Honda JNC1 3.5 L Twin Turbo V6	55	(Italy) Francesco De Luca	Am	2
(Italy) / Nova Race Events; (Italy) / FAEMS Team	Honda NSX GT3 Evo25	Honda JNC1 3.5 L Twin Turbo V6	55	(Brazil) Pedro Ebrahim	PA	3
(Italy) / Nova Race Events; (Italy) / FAEMS Team	Honda NSX GT3 Evo25	Honda JNC1 3.5 L Twin Turbo V6	55	(Italy) Luca Magnoni	PA	3
(Italy) / Nova Race Events; (Italy) / FAEMS Team	Honda NSX GT3 Evo25	Honda JNC1 3.5 L Twin Turbo V6	55	(Italy) Paolo Rocca	PA	3
(San Marino) Audi Sport Italia	Audi R8 LMS Evo II	Audi DAR 5.2 L V10	12	(Italy) Alessandro Bracalente	Am	1–3
(San Marino) Audi Sport Italia	Audi R8 LMS Evo II	Audi DAR 5.2 L V10	12	(Switzerland) Jody Lambrughi	Am	1–3
(San Marino) Audi Sport Italia	Audi R8 LMS Evo II	Audi DAR 5.2 L V10	12	(Italy) Nicolò Soffiati	Am	1–2
(San Marino) Audi Sport Italia	Audi R8 LMS Evo II	Audi DAR 5.2 L V10	12	(Australia) Damien Hamilton	Am	3
(San Marino) Audi Sport Italia	Audi R8 LMS Evo II	Audi DAR 5.2 L V10	12	(Australia) Damien Hamilton	PA	4
(San Marino) Audi Sport Italia	Audi R8 LMS Evo II	Audi DAR 5.2 L V10	12	(France) Thomas Laurent	PA	4
(San Marino) Audi Sport Italia	Audi R8 LMS Evo II	Audi DAR 5.2 L V10	12	(Italy) Nicolò Soffiati	PA	4
(Switzerland) Stratia Motorsport (Note: Antonelli Motorsport serves as the technical service provider for both Stratia Motorsport and AKM Motorsport.)	Mercedes-AMG GT3 Evo	Mercedes-AMG M159 6.2 L V8	16	(France) Sacha Lehmann	Am	All
(Switzerland) Stratia Motorsport	Mercedes-AMG GT3 Evo	Mercedes-AMG M159 6.2 L V8	16	(Germany) Florian Scholze	Am	All
(Switzerland) Stratia Motorsport	Mercedes-AMG GT3 Evo	Mercedes-AMG M159 6.2 L V8	16	(France) Arno Santamato	Am	1
(Switzerland) Stratia Motorsport	Mercedes-AMG GT3 Evo	Mercedes-AMG M159 6.2 L V8	16	(Netherlands) Colin Caresani	Am	2–4
(San Marino) AKM Motorsport	Mercedes-AMG GT3 Evo	Mercedes-AMG M159 6.2 L V8	64	(Israel) Guy Albag	P	All
(San Marino) AKM Motorsport	Mercedes-AMG GT3 Evo	Mercedes-AMG M159 6.2 L V8	64	(Italy) Lorenzo Ferrari	P	All
(San Marino) AKM Motorsport	Mercedes-AMG GT3 Evo	Mercedes-AMG M159 6.2 L V8	73	(Italy) Giuseppe Guirreri	PA	All
(San Marino) AKM Motorsport	Mercedes-AMG GT3 Evo	Mercedes-AMG M159 6.2 L V8	73	(Italy) Stefano Pedani	PA	All
(San Marino) AKM Motorsport	Mercedes-AMG GT3 Evo	Mercedes-AMG M159 6.2 L V8	73	(China) Liang Jiatong	PA	1–2
(Germany) Grupo Prom Racing Team	Mercedes-AMG GT3 Evo	Mercedes-AMG M159 6.2 L V8	17	(Germany) Hubert Haupt	Am	4
(Germany) Grupo Prom Racing Team	Mercedes-AMG GT3 Evo	Mercedes-AMG M159 6.2 L V8	17	(Mexico) Alfredo Hernández	Am	4
(Thailand) Star Performance	Lamborghini Huracán GT3 Evo 2	Lamborghini DGF 5.2 L V10	18	(Germany) Michael Fischbaum	Am	2, 4
(Thailand) Star Performance	Lamborghini Huracán GT3 Evo 2	Lamborghini DGF 5.2 L V10	18	(Serbia) Miloš Pavlović	Am	2, 4
(Thailand) Star Performance	Lamborghini Huracán GT3 Evo 2	Lamborghini DGF 5.2 L V10	18	(Germany) Florian Spengler	Am	2, 4
(Germany) Huber Motorsport	Porsche 911 GT3 R (992.2)	Porsche M97/80 4.2 L Flat-6	20	(United States) Robert Mau	Am	All
(Germany) Huber Motorsport	Porsche 911 GT3 R (992.2)	Porsche M97/80 4.2 L Flat-6	20	(United States) Jonathan Miller	Am	All
(Germany) Huber Motorsport	Porsche 911 GT3 R (992.2)	Porsche M97/80 4.2 L Flat-6	20	(United States) Chandler Hull	Am	1, 3–4
(Germany) Huber Motorsport	Porsche 911 GT3 R (992.2)	Porsche M97/80 4.2 L Flat-6	20	(Luxembourg) Carlos Rivas	Am	2
(Switzerland) Spirit of Race	Ferrari 296 GT3 Evo	Ferrari F163CE 3.0 L Turbo V6	21	(Italy) Michele Rugolo	Am	1–3
(Switzerland) Spirit of Race	Ferrari 296 GT3 Evo	Ferrari F163CE 3.0 L Turbo V6	21	(Netherlands) Willem Van der Worm	Am	1–3
(Switzerland) Spirit of Race	Ferrari 296 GT3 Evo	Ferrari F163CE 3.0 L Turbo V6	21	(Switzerland) Gino Forgione	Am	1–3
(Switzerland) Spirit of Race	Ferrari 296 GT3 Evo	Ferrari F163CE 3.0 L Turbo V6	50	(Spain) Rafael Durán	PA	All
(Switzerland) Spirit of Race	Ferrari 296 GT3 Evo	Ferrari F163CE 3.0 L Turbo V6	50	(South Africa) David Perel	PA	All
(Switzerland) Spirit of Race	Ferrari 296 GT3 Evo	Ferrari F163CE 3.0 L Turbo V6	51	(Italy) Francesco Braschi	PA	All
(Switzerland) Spirit of Race	Ferrari 296 GT3 Evo	Ferrari F163CE 3.0 L Turbo V6	51	(Italy) Riccardo Ponzio	PA	All
(Switzerland) Spirit of Race	Ferrari 296 GT3 Evo	Ferrari F163CE 3.0 L Turbo V6	51	(South Africa) Andrew Rackstraw	PA	All
(Switzerland) Spirit of Race	Ferrari 296 GT3 Evo	Ferrari F163CE 3.0 L Turbo V6	52	(Monaco) Vincent Abril	PA	4
(Switzerland) Spirit of Race	Ferrari 296 GT3 Evo	Ferrari F163CE 3.0 L Turbo V6	52	(Belgium) Laurent De Meeus	PA	4
(Switzerland) Spirit of Race	Ferrari 296 GT3 Evo	Ferrari F163CE 3.0 L Turbo V6	69	(Italy) Fabrizio Fontana	Am	All
(Switzerland) Spirit of Race	Ferrari 296 GT3 Evo	Ferrari F163CE 3.0 L Turbo V6	69	(Italy) Stefano Gai	Am	All
(Switzerland) Spirit of Race	Ferrari 296 GT3 Evo	Ferrari F163CE 3.0 L Turbo V6	83	(United Kingdom) David McDonald	Am	All
(Switzerland) Spirit of Race	Ferrari 296 GT3 Evo	Ferrari F163CE 3.0 L Turbo V6	83	(Denmark) Benny Simonsen	Am	All
(Switzerland) Spirit of Race	Ferrari 296 GT3 Evo	Ferrari F163CE 3.0 L Turbo V6	83	(Spain) Marcos Vivien	Am	1–2
(Italy) Double TT Racing	Ferrari 296 GT3 Evo	Ferrari F163CE 3.0 L Turbo V6	62	(Egypt) Ibrahim Badawy	PA	All
(Italy) Double TT Racing	Ferrari 296 GT3 Evo	Ferrari F163CE 3.0 L Turbo V6	62	(Italy) Leonardo Colavita	PA	All
(Italy) Double TT Racing	Ferrari 296 GT3 Evo	Ferrari F163CE 3.0 L Turbo V6	62	(Belgium) Gilles Renmans	PA	All
(Italy) Gino Motorsport	BMW M4 GT3 Evo	BMW P58 3.0 L Twin Turbo I6	23	(Denmark) Jan Magnussen	P	All
(Italy) Gino Motorsport	BMW M4 GT3 Evo	BMW P58 3.0 L Twin Turbo I6	23	(Denmark) Mathias Villadsen	P	All
(Italy) Gino Motorsport	BMW M4 GT3 Evo	BMW P58 3.0 L Twin Turbo I6	23	(Belgium) Charles Weerts	P	4
(Italy) Dinamic GT	Porsche 911 GT3 R (992.2)	Porsche M97/80 4.2 L Flat-6	24	(Italy) Matteo Cressoni	P	4
(Italy) Dinamic GT	Porsche 911 GT3 R (992.2)	Porsche M97/80 4.2 L Flat-6	24	(Italy) Francesco Simonazzi	P	4
(South Africa) Into Africa Racing by Dragon	Ferrari 296 GT3	Ferrari F163CE 3.0 L Turbo V6	25	(Zimbabwe) Axcil Jefferies	PA	1–3
(South Africa) Into Africa Racing by Dragon	Ferrari 296 GT3	Ferrari F163CE 3.0 L Turbo V6	25	(South Africa) Xolile Letlaka	PA	1–3
(South Africa) Into Africa Racing by Dragon	Ferrari 296 GT3	Ferrari F163CE 3.0 L Turbo V6	25	(South Africa) Stuart White	PA	1–3
(Switzerland) Kessel Racing	Ferrari 296 GT3 Evo	Ferrari F163CE 3.0 L Turbo V6	33	(Turkey) Murat Cuhadaroglu	Am	All
(Switzerland) Kessel Racing	Ferrari 296 GT3 Evo	Ferrari F163CE 3.0 L Turbo V6	33	(Italy) David Fumanelli	Am	All
(Switzerland) Kessel Racing	Ferrari 296 GT3 Evo	Ferrari F163CE 3.0 L Turbo V6	33	(Italy) Marco Pulcini	Am	All
(Switzerland) Kessel Racing	Ferrari 296 GT3 Evo	Ferrari F163CE 3.0 L Turbo V6	93	(Italy) Giacomo Altoè	Am	All
(Switzerland) Kessel Racing	Ferrari 296 GT3 Evo	Ferrari F163CE 3.0 L Turbo V6	93	(Italy) Giovanni Altoè	Am	All
(Switzerland) Kessel Racing	Ferrari 296 GT3 Evo	Ferrari F163CE 3.0 L Turbo V6	93	(United Kingdom) Oscar Ryndziewicz	Am	All
(Italy) Oregon Team	Lamborghini Huracán GT3 Evo 2	Lamborghini DGF 5.2 L V10	36	(France) Enzo Geraci	P	All
(Italy) Oregon Team	Lamborghini Huracán GT3 Evo 2	Lamborghini DGF 5.2 L V10	36	(Italy) Guido Luchetti	P	All
(Italy) Oregon Team	Lamborghini Huracán GT3 Evo 2	Lamborghini DGF 5.2 L V10	36	(Israel) Artem Petrov (Note: Petrov is Russian, but competes under an Israeli licence as Russian national emblems were banned by the FIA following the Russian invasion of Ukraine.)	P	1–2
(Italy) Oregon Team	Lamborghini Huracán GT3 Evo 2	Lamborghini DGF 5.2 L V10	36	(Germany) Maximilian Paul	P	3–4
(Italy) Ebimotors	Porsche 911 GT3 R (992.2)	Porsche M97/80 4.2 L Flat-6	44	(Italy) Alessandro Baccani	Am	All
(Italy) Ebimotors	Porsche 911 GT3 R (992.2)	Porsche M97/80 4.2 L Flat-6	44	(Italy) Leonardo Caglioni	Am	All
(Italy) Ebimotors	Porsche 911 GT3 R (992.2)	Porsche M97/80 4.2 L Flat-6	44	(Italy) Paolo Venerosi	Am	All
(Germany) Rinaldi Racing	Ferrari 296 GT3 Evo	Ferrari F163CE 3.0 L Turbo V6	45	(Italy) Alessandro Balzan	P	All
(Germany) Rinaldi Racing	Ferrari 296 GT3 Evo	Ferrari F163CE 3.0 L Turbo V6	45	(United States) Dylan Medler	P	All
(Italy) Imperiale Racing	Lamborghini Huracán GT3 Evo 2	Lamborghini DGF 5.2 L V10	54	(Republic of Ireland) Alex Denning	PA	All
(Italy) Imperiale Racing	Lamborghini Huracán GT3 Evo 2	Lamborghini DGF 5.2 L V10	54	(Italy) Alessandro Girotti	PA	All
(Italy) Imperiale Racing	Lamborghini Huracán GT3 Evo 2	Lamborghini DGF 5.2 L V10	54	(Italy) Jacopo Guidetti	PA	All
(Italy) Imperiale Racing	Lamborghini Huracán GT3 Evo 2	Lamborghini DGF 5.2 L V10	85	(Italy) Andrea Cola	PA	All
(Italy) Imperiale Racing	Lamborghini Huracán GT3 Evo 2	Lamborghini DGF 5.2 L V10	85	(Argentina) Lautaro De La Iglesia	PA	All
(Italy) Imperiale Racing	Lamborghini Huracán GT3 Evo 2	Lamborghini DGF 5.2 L V10	85	(Hungary) Phillippe Denes	PA	All
(Italy) Raptor Engineering	McLaren 720S GT3 Evo	McLaren M840T 4.0 L Turbo V8	59	(Italy) Alessio Deledda	P	3–4
(Italy) Raptor Engineering	McLaren 720S GT3 Evo	McLaren M840T 4.0 L Turbo V8	59	(Israel) Artem Petrov	P	3–4
(Italy) Raptor Engineering	McLaren 720S GT3 Evo	McLaren M840T 4.0 L Turbo V8	59	(Italy) Riccardo Cazzaniga	P	3
(Italy) Raptor Engineering	McLaren 720S GT3 Evo	McLaren M840T 4.0 L Turbo V8	59	(Belgium) Baptiste Moulin	P	4
(Italy) VSR	Lamborghini Huracán GT3 Evo 2	Lamborghini DGF 5.2 L V10	63	(Italy) Edoardo Liberati	P	All
(Italy) VSR	Lamborghini Huracán GT3 Evo 2	Lamborghini DGF 5.2 L V10	63	(Italy) Mattia Michelotto	P	All
(Italy) VSR	Lamborghini Huracán GT3 Evo 2	Lamborghini DGF 5.2 L V10	63	(Italy) Ignazio Zanon	P	All
(Italy) VSR	Lamborghini Huracán GT3 Evo 2	Lamborghini DGF 5.2 L V10	66	(Belize) Alexander Bowen	P	All
(Italy) VSR	Lamborghini Huracán GT3 Evo 2	Lamborghini DGF 5.2 L V10	66	(Finland) Jesse Salmenautio	P	All
(Italy) VSR	Lamborghini Huracán GT3 Evo 2	Lamborghini DGF 5.2 L V10	66	(United Kingdom) Hugo Cook	P	1, 4
(Italy) VSR	Lamborghini Huracán GT3 Evo 2	Lamborghini DGF 5.2 L V10	66	(Italy) Loris Spinelli	P	2–3
(Italy) DL Racing	Lamborghini Huracán GT3 Evo 2	Lamborghini DGF 5.2 L V10	68	(Italy) Rosario Messina	Am	All
(Italy) DL Racing	Lamborghini Huracán GT3 Evo 2	Lamborghini DGF 5.2 L V10	68	(Italy) Piergiacomo Randazzo	Am	All
(Italy) DL Racing	Lamborghini Huracán GT3 Evo 2	Lamborghini DGF 5.2 L V10	68	(France) Stéphane Tribaudini	Am	1–3
(Italy) DL Racing	Lamborghini Huracán GT3 Evo 2	Lamborghini DGF 5.2 L V10	68	(Italy) Simone Iaquinta	Am	4
(Italy) DL Racing	Lamborghini Huracán GT3 Evo 2	Lamborghini DGF 5.2 L V10	71	(France) Mhedi Bouarfa	PA	1, 3–4
(Italy) DL Racing	Lamborghini Huracán GT3 Evo 2	Lamborghini DGF 5.2 L V10	71	(Paraguay) Miguel María Garcia	PA	1
(Italy) DL Racing	Lamborghini Huracán GT3 Evo 2	Lamborghini DGF 5.2 L V10	71	(Norway) Magnus Gustavsen	PA	1
(Italy) DL Racing	Lamborghini Huracán GT3 Evo 2	Lamborghini DGF 5.2 L V10	71	(Italy) Alberto Clementi Pisani	PA	3–4
(Italy) DL Racing	Lamborghini Huracán GT3 Evo 2	Lamborghini DGF 5.2 L V10	71	(France) Franck Perera	PA	3–4
(Italy) DL Racing	Lamborghini Huracán GT3 Evo 2	Lamborghini DGF 5.2 L V10	71	(France) Mhedi Bouarfa	Am	2
(Italy) DL Racing	Lamborghini Huracán GT3 Evo 2	Lamborghini DGF 5.2 L V10	71	(Paraguay) Miguel María Garcia	Am	2
(Italy) DL Racing	Lamborghini Huracán GT3 Evo 2	Lamborghini DGF 5.2 L V10	71	(Italy) Diego Locanto	Am	2
(Italy) DL Racing	Lamborghini Huracán GT3 Evo 2	Lamborghini DGF 5.2 L V10	72	(Italy) Eliseo Donno	P	All
(Italy) DL Racing	Lamborghini Huracán GT3 Evo 2	Lamborghini DGF 5.2 L V10	72	(Italy) Giacomo Pollini	P	All
(Italy) DL Racing	Lamborghini Huracán GT3 Evo 2	Lamborghini DGF 5.2 L V10	72	(Italy) Luca Segù	P	All
(Italy) Rossocorsa	Ferrari 296 GT3	Ferrari F163CE 3.0 L Turbo V6	74	(Italy) Samuele Buttarelli	PA	All
(Italy) Rossocorsa	Ferrari 296 GT3	Ferrari F163CE 3.0 L Turbo V6	74	(Italy) Stefano Marazzi	PA	All
(Italy) Rossocorsa	Ferrari 296 GT3	Ferrari F163CE 3.0 L Turbo V6	80	(Brazil) Felipinho Bassi Massa	Am	1
(Italy) Rossocorsa	Ferrari 296 GT3	Ferrari F163CE 3.0 L Turbo V6	80	(Italy) Angelo Fontana	Am	1
(Italy) Rossocorsa	Ferrari 296 GT3	Ferrari F163CE 3.0 L Turbo V6	80	(Italy) Niccolò Schirò	Am	1
GT Cup (Division 1)
(Italy) Rossocorsa	Ferrari 296 Challenge	Ferrari F163 3.0 L Turbo V6	107	(Italy) Nicola De Marco	PA	All
(Italy) Rossocorsa	Ferrari 296 Challenge	Ferrari F163 3.0 L Turbo V6	107	(Italy) Raffaele Vitale	PA	All
(Italy) Rossocorsa	Ferrari 296 Challenge	Ferrari F163 3.0 L Turbo V6	232	(United States) Yahn Bernier	Am	3
(Italy) Rossocorsa	Ferrari 296 Challenge	Ferrari F163 3.0 L Turbo V6	232	(Australia) Brian Cook	Am	3
(Italy) Rossocorsa	Ferrari 296 Challenge	Ferrari F163 3.0 L Turbo V6	232	(United States) Roberto Perrina	Am	3
(Switzerland) Spirit of Race	Ferrari 296 Challenge	Ferrari F163 3.0 L Turbo V6	150	(Italy) Federico Al Rifai	PA	All
(Switzerland) Spirit of Race	Ferrari 296 Challenge	Ferrari F163 3.0 L Turbo V6	150	(Italy) Edoardo Barbolini	PA	All
(Switzerland) Spirit of Race	Ferrari 296 Challenge	Ferrari F163 3.0 L Turbo V6	150	(Italy) Simone Patrinicola	PA	All
(Italy) / DL Racing (Note: Car No. 163 entered as DL Racing, and car No. 231 entered as Krypton by DL Racing.); (Italy) / Krypton by DL Racing	Lamborghini Huracán Super Trofeo Evo 2	Lamborghini DGF 5.2 L V10	163	(Italy) Pietro Pio Agoglia	PA	All
(Italy) / DL Racing; (Italy) / Krypton by DL Racing	Lamborghini Huracán Super Trofeo Evo 2	Lamborghini DGF 5.2 L V10	163	(Italy) Mattia Bucci	PA	All
(Italy) / DL Racing; (Italy) / Krypton by DL Racing	Lamborghini Huracán Super Trofeo Evo 2	Lamborghini DGF 5.2 L V10	163	(Italy) Alessandro Cremona	PA	All
(Italy) / DL Racing; (Italy) / Krypton by DL Racing	Ferrari 296 Challenge	Ferrari F163 3.0 L Turbo V6	231	(Italy) Luigi Ferrara	Am	1–3
(Italy) / DL Racing; (Italy) / Krypton by DL Racing	Ferrari 296 Challenge	Ferrari F163 3.0 L Turbo V6	231	(Italy) Francesco Galli	Am	1–3
(Italy) / DL Racing; (Italy) / Krypton by DL Racing	Ferrari 296 Challenge	Ferrari F163 3.0 L Turbo V6	231	(Italy) Simone Iaquinta	Am	3
(Italy) SF Squadra Corse	Lamborghini Huracán Super Trofeo Evo 2	Lamborghini DGF 5.2 L V10	184	(Italy) Matteo Roccadelli	PA	1–2, 4
(Italy) SF Squadra Corse	Lamborghini Huracán Super Trofeo Evo 2	Lamborghini DGF 5.2 L V10	184	(Italy) Luca Franca	PA	1–2
(Italy) SF Squadra Corse	Lamborghini Huracán Super Trofeo Evo 2	Lamborghini DGF 5.2 L V10	184	(Italy) Giacomo Trebbi	PA	1–2
(Italy) SF Squadra Corse	Lamborghini Huracán Super Trofeo Evo 2	Lamborghini DGF 5.2 L V10	184	(Italy) Mattia Lancellotti	PA	4
(Italy) Best Lap	Ferrari 296 Challenge	Ferrari F163 3.0 L Turbo V6	219	(Italy) Luigi Gallo	Am	1–2
(Italy) Best Lap	Ferrari 296 Challenge	Ferrari F163 3.0 L Turbo V6	219	(Italy) Ivan Mari	Am	1–2
(Italy) Best Lap	Ferrari 296 Challenge	Ferrari F163 3.0 L Turbo V6	219	(Italy) Vito Postiglione	Am	1–2
(Italy) Zanasi Racing	Ferrari 296 Challenge	Ferrari F163 3.0 L Turbo V6	269	(Netherlands) Michael Verhagen	Am	3
(Italy) Zanasi Racing	Ferrari 296 Challenge	Ferrari F163 3.0 L Turbo V6	269	(Czech Republic) Hendrik Viol	Am	3
(Italy) Zanasi Racing	Ferrari 296 Challenge	Ferrari F163 3.0 L Turbo V6	269	(Italy) Marco Zanasi	Am	3
GT Cup (Division 2)
(Italy) SP Racing Team	Porsche 992 GT3 Cup (992.1)	Porsche 4.0 L Flat-6	411	(Italy) Federico Bernoni	PA	All
(Italy) SP Racing Team	Porsche 992 GT3 Cup (992.1)	Porsche 4.0 L Flat-6	411	(Italy) Pascal Cardinale	PA	All
(Italy) SP Racing Team	Porsche 992 GT3 Cup (992.1)	Porsche 4.0 L Flat-6	411	(Italy) Gianalberto Coldani	PA	All
(Italy) SP Racing Team	Porsche 992 GT3 Cup (992.1)	Porsche 4.0 L Flat-6	571	(Italy) Massimo Abbati	Am	All
(Italy) SP Racing Team	Porsche 992 GT3 Cup (992.1)	Porsche 4.0 L Flat-6	571	(Italy) Matteo Bergonzini	Am	All
(Italy) SP Racing Team	Porsche 992 GT3 Cup (992.1)	Porsche 4.0 L Flat-6	571	(Greece) Dimitris Deverikos	Am	1–2
(Italy) SP Racing Team	Porsche 992 GT3 Cup (992.1)	Porsche 4.0 L Flat-6	571	(Italy) Stefano Zerbi	Am	3–4
(San Marino) Tsunami RT	Porsche 992 GT3 Cup (992.1)	Porsche 4.0 L Flat-6	419	(Spain) Jamie Casas	PA	4
(San Marino) Tsunami RT	Porsche 992 GT3 Cup (992.1)	Porsche 4.0 L Flat-6	419	(Spain) Miguel González	PA	4
(San Marino) Tsunami RT	Porsche 992 GT3 Cup (992.1)	Porsche 4.0 L Flat-6	419	(Spain) Alonso Sánchez	PA	4
(San Marino) Tsunami RT	Porsche 992 GT3 Cup (992.1)	Porsche 4.0 L Flat-6	577	(Italy) Gianluca Carboni	Am	All
(San Marino) Tsunami RT	Porsche 992 GT3 Cup (992.1)	Porsche 4.0 L Flat-6	577	(Italy) Davide di Benedetto	Am	All
(San Marino) Tsunami RT	Porsche 992 GT3 Cup (992.1)	Porsche 4.0 L Flat-6	577	(Italy) Giuseppe Nicolosi	Am	All
(Italy) SR&R	Ferrari 488 Challenge Evo	Ferrari F154 3.9 L Turbo V8	433	(Italy) Andrea Bodellini	PA	All
(Italy) SR&R	Ferrari 488 Challenge Evo	Ferrari F154 3.9 L Turbo V8	433	(Italy) Giacomo Riva	PA	All
(Italy) SR&R	Ferrari 488 Challenge Evo	Ferrari F154 3.9 L Turbo V8	433	(Republic of Ireland) Lyle Schofield	PA	All
(Italy) SR&R	Ferrari 488 Challenge Evo	Ferrari F154 3.9 L Turbo V8	434	(Italy) Alberto Antonucci	PA	2–3
(Italy) SR&R	Ferrari 488 Challenge Evo	Ferrari F154 3.9 L Turbo V8	434	(Italy) Adriano Bernazzani	PA	2–3
(Italy) SR&R	Ferrari 488 Challenge Evo	Ferrari F154 3.9 L Turbo V8	434	(Italy) Lorenzo Tocci	PA	2–3
(Italy) APEX Competition	Porsche 992 GT3 Cup (992.1)	Porsche 4.0 L Flat-6	488	(Italy) Roberto Benedetti	PA	All
(Italy) APEX Competition	Porsche 992 GT3 Cup (992.1)	Porsche 4.0 L Flat-6	488	(Italy) Danny Santi	PA	All
(Italy) APEX Competition	Porsche 992 GT3 Cup (992.1)	Porsche 4.0 L Flat-6	488	(Italy) Massimiliano Lanza	PA	1–3
(Italy) APEX Competition	Porsche 992 GT3 Cup (992.1)	Porsche 4.0 L Flat-6	488	(Italy) Pierluigi Veronesi	PA	4
(Italy) APEX Competition	Porsche 992 GT3 Cup (992.1)	Porsche 4.0 L Flat-6	531	(Italy) Giovanni Trione	Am	All
(Italy) APEX Competition	Porsche 992 GT3 Cup (992.1)	Porsche 4.0 L Flat-6	531	(Italy) Mauro Trione	Am	All
(Italy) APEX Competition	Porsche 992 GT3 Cup (992.1)	Porsche 4.0 L Flat-6	531	(Italy) Pierluigi Veronesi	Am	1–3
(Italy) APEX Competition	Porsche 992 GT3 Cup (992.1)	Porsche 4.0 L Flat-6	531	(Italy) Valerio Marzi	Am	4
(Italy) Birace Motorsport	Porsche 992 GT3 Cup (992.1)	Porsche 4.0 L Flat-6	533	(Brazil) Ricardo Cesar Alvarez	Am	1–3
(Italy) Birace Motorsport	Porsche 992 GT3 Cup (992.1)	Porsche 4.0 L Flat-6	533	(Brazil) Ciro Paciello	Am	1–3
(Italy) Birace Motorsport	Porsche 992 GT3 Cup (992.1)	Porsche 4.0 L Flat-6	533	(Brazil) Pedro Felipe Perdoncini	Am	1
(Italy) Birace Motorsport	Porsche 992 GT3 Cup (992.1)	Porsche 4.0 L Flat-6	533	(Brazil) João Henrique Gonçalves	Am	2–3
(Italy) ZRS Motorsport	Porsche 992 GT3 Cup (992.1)	Porsche 4.0 L Flat-6	545	(Italy) Francesco Bolzoni	Am	All
(Italy) ZRS Motorsport	Porsche 992 GT3 Cup (992.1)	Porsche 4.0 L Flat-6	545	(Italy) Carlo Contessi	Am	All
(Italy) ZRS Motorsport	Porsche 992 GT3 Cup (992.1)	Porsche 4.0 L Flat-6	545	(Italy) Davide Scannicchio	Am	1
(Italy) ZRS Motorsport	Porsche 992 GT3 Cup (992.1)	Porsche 4.0 L Flat-6	545	(Italy) Francesco Guidi	Am	2–4
Entry Lists:

Icon	Class
GT3 entries
P	Pro Cup
PA	Pro-Am Cup
Am	Am Cup
GT Cup entries
PA	Pro-Am Cup
Am	Am Cup

== Results ==
Bold indicates the overall winners.

=== GT3 ===
Round	Circuit	Date	Pole position	Pro winners	Pro-Am winners	Am winners
1	(Emilia-Romagna) Misano World Circuit Marco Simoncelli	10 May	(San Marino) No. 64 AKM Motorsport	**(Germany) No. 45 Rinaldi Racing**	(Italy) No. 3 Easy Race	(Italy) No. 26 Easy Race
1	(Emilia-Romagna) Misano World Circuit Marco Simoncelli	10 May	(Israel) Guy Albag (Italy) Lorenzo Ferrari	**(Italy) Alessandro Balzan** **(United States) Dylan Medler**	(Italy) Luigi Coluccio (Italy) Mattia Marchiante (Italy) Carlo Tamburini	(Italy) Leonardo Gorini (Italy) Daniel Mancinelli (Italy) Massimo Perrina
2	(Lombardy) Autodromo Nazionale di Monza	21 June	(France) No. 1 CSA Racing	**(Italy) No. 63 VSR**	(Italy) No. 85 Imperiale Racing	(Switzerland) No. 33 Kessel Racing
2	(Lombardy) Autodromo Nazionale di Monza	21 June	(Belgium) Baptiste Moulin (France) Arthur Rougier (India) Sai Sanjay	**(Italy) Edoardo Liberati** **(Italy) Mattia Michelotto** **(Italy) Ignazio Zanon**	(Italy) Andrea Cola (Argentina) Lautaro De La Iglesia (Hungary) Phillippe Denes	(Turkey) Murat Cuhadaroglu (Italy) David Fumanelli (Italy) Marco Pulcini
3	(Emilia-Romagna) Autodromo Internazionale Enzo e Dino Ferrari	6 September	(Switzerland) No. 50 Spirit of Race	**(San Marino) No. 64 AKM Motorsport**	(Switzerland) No. 51 Spirit of Race	(Switzerland) No. 93 Kessel Racing
3	(Emilia-Romagna) Autodromo Internazionale Enzo e Dino Ferrari	6 September	(Spain) Rafael Durán (South Africa) David Perel	**(Israel) Guy Albag** **(Italy) Lorenzo Ferrari**	(Italy) Francesco Braschi (Italy) Riccardo Ponzio (South Africa) Andrew Rackstraw	(Italy) Giacomo Altoè (Italy) Giovanni Altoè (United Kingdom) Oscar Ryndziewicz
4	(Tuscany) Autodromo Internazionale del Mugello	1 November	(San Marino) No. 64 AKM Motorsport	**(Italy) No. 7 BMW Italia Ceccato Racing**	(Italy) No. 71 DL Racing	(Thailand) No. 18 Star Performance
4	(Tuscany) Autodromo Internazionale del Mugello	1 November	(Israel) Guy Albag (Italy) Lorenzo Ferrari	**(Finland) William Alatalo** **(Sweden) Alfred Nilsson** **(Romania) Filip Ugran**	(France) Mhedi Bouarfa (Italy) Alberto Clementi Pisani (France) Franck Perera	(Germany) Michael Fischbaum (Serbia) Miloš Pavlović (Germany) Florian Spengler

=== GT Cup ===
Round	Circuit	Date	Pole position	Div. 1 Pro-Am Winners	Div. 1 Am Winners	Div. 2 Pro-Am Winners	Div. 2 Am Winners
1	(Emilia-Romagna) Misano World Circuit Marco Simoncelli	10 May	(Switzerland) No. 150 Spirit of Race	**(Switzerland) No. 150 Spirit of Race**	(Italy) No. 231 Krypton by DL Racing	(Italy) No. 488 APEX Competition	(Italy) No. 545 ZRS Motorsport
1	(Emilia-Romagna) Misano World Circuit Marco Simoncelli	10 May	(Italy) Federico Al Rifai (Italy) Edoardo Barbolini (Italy) Simone Patrinicola	**(Italy) Federico Al Rifai** **(Italy) Edoardo Barbolini** **(Italy) Simone Patrinicola**	(Italy) Luigi Ferrara (Italy) Francesco Galli	(Italy) Roberto Benedetti (Italy) Massimiliano Lanza (Italy) Danny Santi	(Italy) Francesco Bolzoni (Italy) Carlo Contessi (Italy) Davide Scannicchio
2	(Lombardy) Autodromo Nazionale di Monza	21 June	(Italy) No. 184 SF Squadra Corse	**(Switzerland) No. 150 Spirit of Race**	(Italy) No. 231 Krypton by DL Racing	(Italy) No. 433 SR&R	(Italy) No. 545 ZRS Motorsport
2	(Lombardy) Autodromo Nazionale di Monza	21 June	(Italy) Luca Franca (Italy) Matteo Roccadelli (Italy) Giacomo Trebbi	**(Italy) Federico Al Rifai** **(Italy) Edoardo Barbolini** **(Italy) Simone Patrinicola**	(Italy) Luigi Ferrara (Italy) Francesco Galli	(Italy) Andrea Bodellini (Italy) Giacomo Riva (Republic of Ireland) Lyle Schofield	(Italy) Francesco Bolzoni (Italy) Carlo Contessi (Italy) Francesco Guidi
3	(Emilia-Romagna) Autodromo Internazionale Enzo e Dino Ferrari	6 September	(Italy) No. 269 Zanasi Racing	(Italy) No. 163 DL Racing	**(Italy) No. 231 Krypton by DL Racing**	(Italy) No. 488 APEX Competition	(San Marino) No. 577 Tsunami RT
3	(Emilia-Romagna) Autodromo Internazionale Enzo e Dino Ferrari	6 September	(Netherlands) Michael Verhagen (Czech Republic) Hendrik Viol (Italy) Marco Zanasi	(Italy) Pietro Pio Agoglia (Italy) Mattia Bucci (Italy) Alessandro Cremona	**(Italy) Luigi Ferrara** **(Italy) Francesco Galli** **(Italy) Simone Iaquinta**	(Italy) Roberto Benedetti (Italy) Massimiliano Lanza (Italy) Danny Santi	(Italy) Gianluca Carboni (Italy) Davide di Benedetto (Italy) Giuseppe Nicolosi
4	(Tuscany) Autodromo Internazionale del Mugello	1 November	(Italy) No. 184 SF Squadra Corse	**(Switzerland) No. 150 Spirit of Race**	No Entries	(Italy) No. 433 SR&R	(Italy) No. 545 ZRS Motorsport
4	(Tuscany) Autodromo Internazionale del Mugello	1 November	(Italy) Luca Franca (Italy) Matteo Roccadelli (Italy) Giacomo Trebbi	**(Italy) Federico Al Rifai** **(Italy) Edoardo Barbolini** **(Italy) Simone Patrinicola**	No Entries	(Italy) Andrea Bodellini (Italy) Giacomo Riva (Republic of Ireland) Lyle Schofield	(Italy) Francesco Bolzoni (Italy) Carlo Contessi (Italy) Francesco Guidi

== Standings ==
=== Drivers' championships ===
==== Scoring system ====
Duration	1st	2nd	3rd	4th	5th	6th	7th	8th	9th	10th
100 Minutes	12	10	8	7	6	5	4	3	2	1
3 Hours	20	15	12	10	7	5	4	3	2	1

==== GT3 ====
===== Overall =====
Pos.	Driver	Team	MIS	MNZ	IMO	MUG	Pts	Net Points
1	(Italy) Alessandro Balzan (United States) Dylan Medler	(Germany) Rinaldi Racing	1^{3}	6	11^{8}	3^{2}	58	58
2	(Italy) Edoardo Liberati (Italy) Mattia Michelotto (Italy) Ignazio Zanon	(Italy) VSR	10^{2}	1^{1}	28	5^{3}	58	58
3	(Israel) Guy Albag (Italy) Lorenzo Ferrari	(San Marino) AKM Motorsport	3^{1}	13	1^{1}	32	56	56
4	(Finland) William Alatalo (Sweden) Alfred Nilsson (Romania) Filip Ugran	(Italy) BMW Italia Ceccato Racing	Ret	3^{3}	14	1^{5}	46	46
5	(Italy) Eliseo Donno (Italy) Giacomo Pollini (Italy) Luca Segù	(Italy) DL Racing	35^{7}	2^{2}	8	28^{1}	44	44
6	(Denmark) Jan Magnussen (Denmark) Mathias Villadsen	(Italy) Gino Motorsport	2^{5}	15	6^{5}	9	34	34
7	(Spain) Rafael Durán (South Africa) David Perel	(Switzerland) Spirit of Race	14^{6}	11	3^{2}	12^{7}	31	31
8	(Italy) Francesco Braschi (Italy) Riccardo Ponzio (South Africa) Andrew Rackstraw	(Switzerland) Spirit of Race	7	12	2^{3}	Ret	27	27
9	(France) Enzo Geraci (Italy) Guido Luchetti	(Italy) Oregon Team	32	7^{6}	4^{4}	11	26	26
10	(Belize) Alexander Bowen (Finland) Jesse Salmenautio	(Italy) VSR	12^{4}	5	12^{7}	6	23	23
11	(Italy) Luigi Coluccio (Italy) Mattia Marchiante (Italy) Carlo Tamburini	(Italy) Easy Race	4^{8}	Ret	22^{9}	8	18	18
12	(Italy) Andrea Cola (Argentina) Lautaro De La Iglesia (Hungary) Phillippe Denes	(Italy) Imperiale Racing	5^{9}	9^{10}	5	15	18	18
13	(Belgium) Baptiste Moulin	(France) CSA Racing	24	4^{4}			17	17
13	(Belgium) Baptiste Moulin	(Italy) Raptor Engineering				24	17	17
13	(India) Sai Sanjay	(France) CSA Racing	24	4^{4}	27		17	17
14	(Republic of Ireland) Alex Denning (Italy) Alessandro Girotti (Italy) Jacopo Guidetti	(Italy) Imperiale Racing	8	Ret^{9}	26	4^{9}	16	16
15	(Italy) Alberto Clementi Pisani	(Germany) Tresor Attempto Racing	37	20			15	15
15	(Italy) Alberto Clementi Pisani	(Italy) DL Racing			24	2	15	15
15	(France) Mhedi Bouarfa	(Italy) DL Racing	29	Ret	24	2	15	15
16	(Italy) Andrea Frassineti (Israel) Ariel Levi	(Germany) Tresor Attempto Racing	DSQ	Ret	29^{6}	10^{4}	13	13
16	(Germany) Alex Aka	(Germany) Tresor Attempto Racing	DSQ		29^{6}	10^{4}	13	13
17	(Israel) Artem Petrov	(Italy) Oregon Team	32	7^{6}			9	9
17	(Israel) Artem Petrov	(Italy) Raptor Engineering			Ret	24	9	9
18	(Turkey) Murat Cuhadaroglu (Italy) David Fumanelli (Italy) Marco Pulcini	(Switzerland) Kessel Racing	25^{10}	8^{7}	Ret	Ret	8	8
19	(Switzerland) Jasin Ferati (Italy) Francesco Guerra	(Italy) Nova Race Events	18	28^{5}	Ret^{10}	Ret	7	7
20	(Switzerland) Jean-Luc D'Auria	(Italy) Nova Race Events	18	28^{5}	Ret^{10}		7	7
21	(Italy) Giacomo Altoè (Italy) Giovanni Altoè (United Kingdom) Oscar Ryndziewicz	(Switzerland) Kessel Racing	21	14^{8}	13	30^{8}	6	6
22	(Italy) Filippo Barberi (Italy) Jacopo Cimenes (Italy) Riccardo Leone Cirelli	(Italy) BMW Italia Ceccato Racing	9	10	9	18	5	5
23	(Zimbabwe) Axcil Jefferies (South Africa) Xolile Letlaka (South Africa) Stuart White	(South Africa) Into Africa Racing by Dragon	6	17	Ret		5	5
24	(Egypt) Ibrahim Badawy (Italy) Leonardo Colavita (Belgium) Gilles Renmans	(Italy) Double TT Racing	33	18	7	Ret	4	4
25	(Italy) Giuseppe Guirreri (Italy) Stefano Pedani	(San Marino) AKM Motorsport	20	26	10	22	1	1
	(Italy) Leonardo Gorini (Italy) Massimo Perrina	(Italy) Easy Race	11	16	16	13	0	0
	(Italy) Daniel Mancinelli	(Italy) Easy Race	11		16	13	0	0
	(France) Simon Gachet (France) Luciano Morano	(France) CSA Racing	13	Ret	27		0	0
	(Italy) Alessio Deledda	(France) CSA Racing	13	Ret			0	0
	(Italy) Alessio Deledda	(Italy) Raptor Engineering			Ret	24	0	0
	(United Kingdom) David McDonald (Denmark) Benny Simonsen	(Switzerland) Spirit of Race	28	23	Ret	14	0	0
	(Italy) Massimo Ciglia	(Italy) FAEMS Team	23	24	15	21	0	0
	(Italy) Jenny Sonzogni	(Italy) FAEMS Team	23	24	15		0	0
	(Italy) Rodolfo Massaro	(Italy) FAEMS Team		24	15	21	0	0
	(Italy) Rosario Messina (Italy) Piergiacomo Randazzo	(Italy) DL Racing	16	Ret	17	Ret	0	0
	(France) Stéphane Tribaudini	(Italy) DL Racing	16	Ret	17		0	0
	(Italy) Nicolò Soffiati	(San Marino) Audi Sport Italia	36	29		16	0	0
	(Italy) Marco Cassarà (Denmark) Sebastian Øgaard	(Germany) Tresor Attempto Racing	17	30	Ret	19	0	0
	(Italy) Samuele Buttarelli (Italy) Stefano Marazzi	(Italy) Rossocorsa	34	Ret	18	20	0	0
	(Italy) Vittorio Viglietti	(Germany) Tresor Attempto Racing	37	20	Ret	19	0	0
	(United States) Robert Mau (United States) Jonathan Miller	(Germany) Huber Motorsport	19	21	23	23	0	0
	(United States) Chandler Hull	(Germany) Huber Motorsport	19		23	23	0	0
	(France) Sacha Lehmann (Germany) Florian Scholze	(Switzerland) Stratia Motorsport	26	19	Ret	25	0	0
	(Netherlands) Colin Caresani	(Switzerland) Stratia Motorsport		19	Ret	25	0	0
	(Italy) Fabrizio Fontana (Italy) Stefano Gai	(Switzerland) Spirit of Race	31	Ret	19	26	0	0
	(Switzerland) Gino Forgione (Italy) Michele Rugolo (Netherlands) Willem Van der Worm	(Switzerland) Spirit of Race	27	25	20		0	0
	(Italy) Luca Magnoni	(Italy) Nova Race Events	30	27	21		0	0
	(Italy) Alessandro Bracalente	(San Marino) Audi Sport Italia	36	29	Ret		0	0
	(Italy) Alessandro Bracalente	(Italy) FAEMS Team				21	0	0
	(Italy) Alessandro Baccani (Italy) Leonardo Caglioni (Italy) Paolo Venerosi	(Italy) Ebimotors	22	22	25	Ret	0	0
	(Switzerland) Jody Lambrughi	(San Marino) Audi Sport Italia	36	29	Ret		0	0
Not classified
—	(France) Arthur Rougier	(France) CSA Racing	24	4^{4}			17	0
—	(Germany) Maximilian Paul	(Italy) Oregon Team			4^{4}	11	17	0
—	(France) Franck Perera	(Italy) DL Racing			24	2	15	0
—	(United Kingdom) Hugo Cook	(Italy) VSR	12^{4}			6	12	0
—	(Italy) Loris Spinelli	(Italy) VSR		5	12^{7}		11	0
—	(Italy) Matteo Cressoni (Italy) Francesco Simonazzi	(Italy) Dinamic GT				27^{6}	5	0
—	(Germany) Michael Fischbaum (Serbia) Miloš Pavlović (Germany) Florian Spengler	(Thailand) Star Performance		Ret		7	4	0
—	(Belgium) Charles Weerts	(Italy) Gino Motorsport				9	2	0
—	(Brazil) Felipinho Bassi Massa (Italy) Angelo Fontana (Italy) Niccolò Schirò	(Italy) Rossocorsa	15				0	0
—	(Australia) Damien Hamilton	(San Marino) Audi Sport Italia			Ret	16	0	0
—	(France) Thomas Laurent	(San Marino) Audi Sport Italia				16	0	0
—	(Italy) Luca Ghiotto	(Italy) Easy Race		16			0	0
—	(Italy) Rocco Mazzola	(Germany) Tresor Attempto Racing	17	Ret			0	0
—	(Slovakia) Adam Konôpka (Slovakia) Miro Konôpka (Slovakia) Zdeno Mikulasko	(Slovakia) ARC Bratislava				17	0	0
—	(China) Liang Jiatong	(San Marino) AKM Motorsport	20	26			0	0
—	(Italy) Alberto Di Folco	(Germany) Tresor Attempto Racing	37	20			0	0
—	(Italy) Paolo Rocca	(Italy) Nova Race Events	30		21		0	0
—	(Luxembourg) Carlos Rivas	(Germany) Huber Motorsport		21			0	0
—	(Brazil) Pedro Ebrahim	(Italy) Nova Race Events			21		0	0
—	(Spain) Marcos Vivien	(Switzerland) Spirit of Race	28	23			0	0
—	(Italy) Alessandro Tarabini	(Italy) FAEMS Team	23				0	0
—	(France) Arno Santamato	(Switzerland) Stratia Motorsport	26				0	0
—	(Italy) Alessandro Marchetti	(Italy) Nova Race Events	30	27			0	0
—	(Italy) Francesco De Luca	(Italy) Nova Race Events		27			0	0
—	(Paraguay) Miguel Garcia	(Italy) DL Racing	29	Ret			0	0
—	(Norway) Magnus Gustavsen	(Italy) DL Racing	29				0	0
—	(Monaco) Vincent Abril (Belgium) Laurent De Meeus	(Switzerland) Spirit of Race				29	0	0
—	(South Africa) Marius Jackson	(Germany) Tresor Attempto Racing		30			0	0
—	(Germany) Hubert Haupt (Mexico) Alfredo Hernández	(Germany) Grupo Prom Racing Team				31	0	0
—	(Italy) Diego Locanto	(Italy) DL Racing		Ret			0	0
—	(Italy) Riccardo Cazzaniga	(Italy) Raptor Engineering			Ret		0	0
—	(Italy) Felice Jelmini	(Italy) Nova Race Events				Ret	0	0
—	(Italy) Simone Iaquinta	(Italy) DL Racing				Ret	0	0
Pos.	Driver	Team	MIS	MNZ	IMO	MUG	Pts	Net Points

===== Pro-Am =====
Pos.	Driver	Team	MIS	MNZ	IMO	MUG	Pts	Net Points
1	(Spain) Rafael Durán (South Africa) David Perel	(Switzerland) Spirit of Race	7^{3}	3^{4}	2^{1}	4^{1}	84	80
2	(Italy) Andrea Cola (Argentina) Lautaro De La Iglesia (Hungary) Phillippe Denes	(Italy) Imperiale Racing	2^{3}	1^{3}	3^{6}	5^{6}	80	75
3	(Italy) Luigi Coluccio (Italy) Mattia Marchiante (Italy) Carlo Tamburini	(Italy) Easy Race	1^{2}	Ret	9^{3}	3^{4}	59	59
4	(Italy) Francesco Braschi (Italy) Riccardo Ponzio (South Africa) Andrew Rackstraw	(Switzerland) Spirit of Race	4^{7}	4^{8}	1^{2}	Ret	57	57
5	(Italy) Filippo Barberi (Italy) Jacopo Cimenes (Italy) Riccardo Leone Cirelli	(Italy) BMW Italia Ceccato Racing	6^{6}	2^{5}	5^{5}	7^{8}	51	48
6	(Republic of Ireland) Alex Denning (Italy) Alessandro Girotti (Italy) Jacopo Guidetti	(Italy) Imperiale Racing	5^{8}	Ret^{2}	11^{9}	2^{2}	47	47
7	(Italy) Alberto Clementi Pisani	(Germany) Tresor Attempto Racing	14^{5}	7^{6}			42	42
7	(Italy) Alberto Clementi Pisani	(Italy) DL Racing			10	1^{5}	42	42
8	(Zimbabwe) Axcil Jefferies (South Africa) Xolile Letlaka (South Africa) Stuart White	(South Africa) Into Africa Racing by Dragon	3^{4}	5^{7}	Ret		30	30
9	(France) Mhedi Bouarfa	(Italy) DL Racing	11		10	1^{5}	27	27
10	(Switzerland) Jasin Ferati (Italy) Francesco Guerra	(Italy) Nova Race Events	9	9^{1}	Ret^{4}	Ret	23	23
10	(Switzerland) Jean-Luc D'Auria	(Italy) Nova Race Events	9	9^{1}	Ret^{4}		23	23
11	(Egypt) Ibrahim Badawy (Italy) Leonardo Colavita (Belgium) Gilles Renmans	(Italy) Double TT Racing	12^{9}	6^{9}	4^{7}	Ret	23	23
12	(Italy) Giuseppe Guirreri (Italy) Stefano Pedani	(San Marino) AKM Motorsport	10	8^{10}	6^{10}	9^{7}	17	17
13	(Italy) Samuele Buttarelli (Italy) Stefano Marazzi	(Italy) Rossocorsa	13^{10}	Ret	7^{8}	8^{10}	12	12
Not classified
—	(France) Franck Perera	(Italy) DL Racing			10	1^{5}	27	0
—	(Italy) Alberto Di Folco (Italy) Vittorio Viglietti	(Germany) Tresor Attempto Racing	14^{5}	7^{6}			15	0
—	(Monaco) Vincent Abril (Belgium) Laurent De Meeus	(Switzerland) Spirit of Race				10^{3}	9	0
—	(Australia) Damien Hamilton (France) Thomas Laurent (Italy) Nicolò Soffiati	(San Marino) Audi Sport Italia				6^{9}	7	0
—	(China) Liang Jiatong	(San Marino) AKM Motorsport	10	8^{10}			5	0
—	(Italy) Marco Cassarà (Italy) Rocco Mazzola (Denmark) Sebastian Øgaard	(Germany) Tresor Attempto Racing	8				3	0
—	(Brazil) Pedro Ebrahim (Italy) Luca Magnoni (Italy) Paolo Rocca	(Italy) Nova Race Events			8		3	0
—	(Paraguay) Miguel Garcia (Norway) Magnus Gustavsen	(Italy) DL Racing	11				0	0
—	(Italy) Felice Jelmini	(Italy) Nova Race Events				Ret	0	0
Pos.	Driver	Team	MIS	MNZ	IMO	MUG	Pts	Net Points

===== Am =====
Pos.	Driver	Team	MIS	MNZ	IMO	MUG	Pts	Net Points
1	(Italy) Leonardo Gorini (Italy) Massimo Perrina	(Italy) Easy Race	1^{4}	3^{4}	3^{3}	2^{2}	91	84
2	(Italy) Giacomo Altoè (Italy) Giovanni Altoè (United Kingdom) Oscar Ryndziewicz	(Switzerland) Kessel Racing	5^{5}	2^{2}	1^{2}	10^{1}	81	80
3	(Italy) Daniel Mancinelli	(Italy) Easy Race	1^{4}		3^{3}	2^{2}	72	72
4	(Turkey) Murat Cuhadaroglu (Italy) David Fumanelli (Italy) Marco Pulcini	(Switzerland) Kessel Racing	8^{1}	1^{1}	Ret	Ret^{7}	51	51
5	(Italy) Rosario Messina (Italy) Piergiacomo Randazzo	(Italy) DL Racing	3^{3}	Ret	4^{1}	Ret	42	42
5	(France) Stéphane Tribaudini	(Italy) DL Racing	3^{3}	Ret	4^{1}		42	42
6	(United States) Robert Mau (United States) Jonathan Miller	(Germany) Huber Motorsport	4^{8}	5^{7}	7^{6}	7^{9}	39	37
7	(Italy) Massimo Ciglia	(Italy) FAEMS Team	7^{9}	8	2^{5}	6^{10}	36	36
8	(France) Sacha Lehmann (Germany) Florian Scholze	(Switzerland) Stratia Motorsport	9^{6}	4^{10}	Ret^{7}	8^{3}	33	33
9	(Italy) Rodolfo Massaro	(Italy) FAEMS Team		8	2^{5}	6^{10}	30	30
10	(Italy) Jenny Sonzogni	(Italy) FAEMS Team	7^{9}	8	2^{5}		30	30
11	(Italy) Alessandro Baccani (Italy) Leonardo Caglioni (Italy) Paolo Venerosi	(Italy) Ebimotors	6^{7}	7^{5}	8^{4}	Ret	29	29
12	(United States) Chandler Hull	(Germany) Huber Motorsport	4^{8}		7^{6}	7^{9}	28	28
13	(Netherlands) Colin Caresani	(Switzerland) Stratia Motorsport		4^{10}	Ret^{7}	8^{3}	26	26
14	(United Kingdom) David McDonald (Denmark) Benny Simonsen	(Switzerland) Spirit of Race	11	7	Ret	3^{5}	22	22
15	(Italy) Alessandro Bracalente	(San Marino) Audi Sport Italia	14^{2}	11^{6}	Ret		21	21
15	(Italy) Alessandro Bracalente	(Italy) FAEMS Team				6^{10}	21	21
16	(Italy) Marco Cassarà (Denmark) Sebastian Øgaard	(Germany) Tresor Attempto Racing		12^{3}	Ret	5^{6}	20	20
17	(Switzerland) Jody Lambrughi	(San Marino) Audi Sport Italia	14^{2}	11^{6}	Ret		15	15
18	(Switzerland) Gino Forgione (Italy) Michele Rugolo (Netherlands) Willem Van der Worm	(Switzerland) Spirit of Race	10	9^{9}	6^{8}		13	13
19	(Italy) Fabrizio Fontana (Italy) Stefano Gai	(Switzerland) Spirit of Race	13	Ret	5^{9}	9	11	11
Not classified
—	(Germany) Michael Fischbaum (Serbia) Miloš Pavlović (Germany) Florian Spengler	(Thailand) Star Performance		Ret		1^{4}	27	0
—	(Italy) Luca Ghiotto	(Italy) Easy Race		3^{4}			19	0
—	(Brazil) Felipinho Bassi Massa (Italy) Angelo Fontana (Italy) Niccolò Schirò	(Italy) Rossocorsa	2^{10}				16	0
—	(Italy) Nicolò Soffiati	(San Marino) Audi Sport Italia	14^{2}	11^{6}			15	0
—	(Slovakia) Adam Konôpka (Slovakia) Miro Konôpka (Slovakia) Zdeno Mikulasko	(Slovakia) ARC Bratislava				4^{8}	13	13
—	(Italy) Vittorio Viglietti	(Germany) Tresor Attempto Racing			Ret	5^{6}	12	0
—	(Luxembourg) Carlos Rivas	(Germany) Huber Motorsport		5^{7}			11	0
—	(South Africa) Marius Jackson	(Germany) Tresor Attempto Racing		12^{3}			8	0
—	(France) Arno Santamato	(Switzerland) Stratia Motorsport	9^{6}				7	0
—	(Italy) Alessandro Tarabini	(Italy) FAEMS Team	7^{9}				6	0
—	(Spain) Marcos Vivien	(Switzerland) Spirit of Race	11	7			4	0
—	(Italy) Luca Magnoni (Italy) Alessandro Marchetti	(Italy) Nova Race Events	12	10			1	0
—	(Italy) Francesco De Luca	(Italy) Nova Race Events		10			1	0
—	(Germany) Hubert Haupt (Mexico) Alfredo Hernández	(Germany) Grupo Prom Racing Team				11	0	0
—	(Italy) Paolo Rocca	(Italy) Nova Race Events	12				0	0
—	(France) Mhedi Bouarfa (Paraguay) Miguel Garcia (Italy) Diego Locanto	(Italy) DL Racing		Ret			0	0
—	(Australia) Damien Hamilton	(San Marino) Audi Sport Italia			Ret		0	0
—	(Italy) Simone Iaquinta	(Italy) DL Racing				Ret	0	0
Pos.	Driver	Team	MIS	MNZ	IMO	MUG	Pts	Net Points

== See also ==
- 2026 Italian GT Championship
- 2026 Italian GT Championship Sprint Cup
- 2026 GT4 Italian Series
