= Alastaro Circuit =

Motor racing circuit in Loimaa, Finland

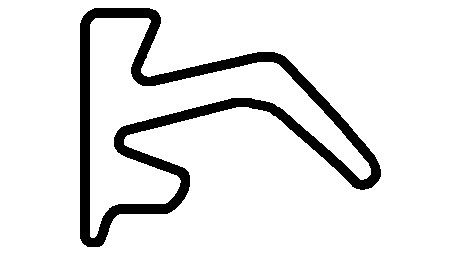
- Medium Circuit (1996–present)
- Location: Loimaa, Finland
- Coordinates: 60°58′27.26″N 22°39′20.09″E
- Owner: Tero Tupala (2007–present)
- Opened: 1990
- Major events: Former: SMP F4 Championship (2015, 2018–2019); Scandinavian Touring Car Championship (2017); European Truck Racing Championship (1999–2002, 2004)
- Website: https://www.alastarocircuit.fi/

Full Circuit (2023–present)
- Length: 4.317 km (2.682 mi)
- Turns: 18

Medium Circuit (1996–present)
- Length: 2.721 km (1.691 mi)
- Turns: 11
- Race lap record: 1:09.567 ( (Russia) Michael Belov, Tatuus F4-T014, 2018, F4)

Motorcycle Circuit (1996–present)
- Length: 2.850 km (1.771 mi)
- Turns: 12
- Race lap record: 1:15.639 ( (Finland) Niki Tuuli, Kawasaki Ninja ZX-10R, 2021, SBK)

Folkrace Circuit (1996–present)
- Length: 1.800 km (1.118 mi)
- Turns: 10

Original Circuit (1990–1995)
- Length: 3.000 km (1.864 mi)
- Turns: 11

The Alastaro Circuit is a racing circuit situated in Virttaa village in Loimaa, Finland. The track is 4.317 km (2.682 mi) long. There are also "jokamiesluokka" (folkrace) and drag racing tracks in the same area. In 2023, the track length is extended from 2.721 to 4.317 km (1.691 to 2.682 mi).

The circuit is named after Alastaro, which was a former municipality of Finland. It was merged to town of Loimaa in 2009.

Track info:

- Length of full track: 4.317 km (2.682 mi)
- Length of medium track: 2.721 km (1.691 mi)
- Length of folkrace track: 1.800 km (1.118 mi)
- Run: clockwise
- Width: 12–15 m (39–49 ft)

== Lap records ==
As of August 2021, the fastest official race lap records at the Alastaro Circuit are listed as:

Category	Time	Driver	Vehicle	Event
Medium Circuit (1996–present): 2.721 km (1.691 mi)
Formula 4	1:09.567	Michael Belov	Tatuus F4-T014	2018 Alastaro SMP F4 round
Formula Three	1:11.437	Andrea Belicchi	Dallara F399	2003 Alastaro Finnish F3 round
Formula Renault 2.0	1:11.503	Juhan Jokinen	Tatuus FR2000	2008 Alastaro Finnish Formula Renault 2.0 round
Formula Ford	1:13.026	Elias Niskanen	Mtec Fd09	2018 Alastaro Finnish Formula Ford round
Porsche Carrera Cup	1:14.456	Oliver Tiirmaa	Porsche 911 (991 II) GT3 Cup	2018 Alastaro Porsche GT3 Cup Challenge Finland round
Formula Renault 1.6	1:16.816	Linus Lundqvist	Signatech FR1.6	2016 Alastaro Formula STCC Nordic round
TCR Touring Car	1:17.889	Johan Kristoffersson	Volkswagen Golf GTI TCR	2017 Alastaro TCR Scandinavia round
Super 2000	1:21.161	Jari Nurminen	Audi A4	2005 Alastaro FTCC round
Renault Clio Cup	1:23.671	Joel Jern	Renault Clio RS IV	2017 Alastaro Clio Cup Sweden round
Truck racing	1:29.514	Marcus Bösiger	MAN TR 1400	2001 Alastaro ETRC round
Motorcycle Circuit (1996–present): 2.850 km (1.771 mi)
Superbike	1:15.639	Niki Tuuli	Kawasaki Ninja ZX-10R	2021 Alastaro Finnish/Estonian SBK round
