= 2019 Budapest Formula 3 round =

Motor racing competition

(Hungary) 2019 Budapest Formula 3 round
Round details
- Round 5 of 8 in the 2019 FIA Formula 3 Championship.
- Layout of the Hungaroring
- Location: Hungaroring; Mogyoród, Pest, Hungary
- Course: Permanent racing facility 4.381 km (2.722 mi)

Race 1
- Date: 3 August 2019
- Laps: 22
Pole position
| Driver | (Denmark) Christian Lundgaard | ART Grand Prix |
| Time | 1:31.761 | |
Podium
| First | (Denmark) Christian Lundgaard | ART Grand Prix |
| Second | (United Kingdom) Max Fewtrell | ART Grand Prix |
| Third | (United Kingdom) Jake Hughes | HWA Racelab |
Fastest lap
| Driver | (Denmark) Christian Lundgaard | ART Grand Prix |
- Time: 1:36.055 (on lap 22)

Race 2
- Date: 4 August 2019
- Laps: 22
Podium
| First | (New Zealand) Marcus Armstrong | Prema Racing |
| Second | (Italy) Leonardo Pulcini | Hitech Grand Prix |
| Third | (United Kingdom) Jake Hughes | HWA Racelab |
Fastest lap
| Driver | (New Zealand) Marcus Armstrong | Prema Racing |
- Time: 1:35.307 (on lap 4)

The 2019 Budapest FIA Formula 3 round was a motor racing event held on 3 and 4 August 2019 at the Hungaroring, Mogyoród, Pest, Hungary. It was the fifth round of the 2019 FIA Formula 3 Championship, and ran in support of the 2019 Hungarian Grand Prix.

== Classification ==
=== Qualifying ===
The Qualifying session took place on 2 August 2019, with Christian Lundgaard scoring pole position.

| Pos. | No. | Driver | Team | Time/Gap | Grid |
|---|---|---|---|---|---|
| 1 | 3 | (Denmark) Christian Lundgaard | ART Grand Prix | 1:31.761 | 1 |
| 2 | 21 | (Estonia) Jüri Vips | Hitech Grand Prix | +0.125 | 2 |
| 3 | 2 | (United Kingdom) Max Fewtrell | ART Grand Prix | +0.136 | 3 |
| 4 | 28 | (Russia) Robert Shwartzman | Prema Racing | +0.142 | 4 |
| 5 | 19 | (Finland) Niko Kari | Trident | +0.213 | 5 |
| 6 | 18 | (Brazil) Pedro Piquet | Trident | +0.226 | 6 |
| 7 | 11 | (United Kingdom) Jake Hughes | HWA Racelab | +0.276 | 7 |
| 8 | 1 | (Germany) David Beckmann | ART Grand Prix | +0.316 | 8 |
| 9 | 14 | (Japan) Yuki Tsunoda | Jenzer Motorsport | +0.436 | 9 |
| 10 | 30 | (Brazil) Felipe Drugovich | Carlin Buzz Racing | +0.595 | 10 |
| 11 | 20 | (Italy) Leonardo Pulcini | Hitech Grand Prix | +0.614 | 11 |
| 12 | 25 | (Spain) Sebastián Fernández | Campos Racing | +0.615 | 12 |
| 13 | 26 | (New Zealand) Marcus Armstrong | Prema Racing | +0.624 | 13 |
| 14 | 23 | (Australia) Alex Peroni | Campos Racing | +0.641 | 14 |
| 15 | 9 | (United Kingdom) Raoul Hyman | Sauber Junior Team by Charouz | +0.725 | 15 |
| 16 | 6 | (Netherlands) Richard Verschoor | MP Motorsport | +0.804 | 16 |
| 17 | 27 | (India) Jehan Daruvala | Prema Racing | +0.832 | 17 |
| 18 | 22 | (China) Ye Yifei | Hitech Grand Prix | +0.860 | 18 |
| 19 | 31 | (United States) Logan Sargeant | Carlin Buzz Racing | +0.931 | 19 |
| 20 | 4 | (New Zealand) Liam Lawson | MP Motorsport | +0.934 | 20 |
| 21 | 29 | (Japan) Teppei Natori | Carlin Buzz Racing | +0.966 | 21 |
| 22 | 8 | (Switzerland) Fabio Scherer | Sauber Junior Team by Charouz | +1.112 | 22 |
| 23 | 5 | (Finland) Simo Laaksonen | MP Motorsport | +1.184 | 23 |
| 24 | 7 | (Germany) Lirim Zendeli | Sauber Junior Team by Charouz | +1.226 | 24 |
| 25 | 17 | (Canada) Devlin DeFrancesco | Trident | +1.286 | 25 |
| 26 | 10 | (Netherlands) Bent Viscaal | HWA Racelab | +1.303 | 26 |
| 27 | 12 | (Iran) Keyvan Andres | HWA Racelab | +1.332 | 27 |
| 28 | 15 | (Switzerland) Giorgio Carrara | Jenzer Motorsport | +1.611 | 28 |
| 29 | 16 | (Germany) Andreas Estner | Jenzer Motorsport | +1.708 | 29 |
| 30 | 24 | (Italy) Alessio Deledda | Campos Racing | +3.255 | 30 |

=== Race 1 ===
| Pos. | No. | Driver | Team | Laps | Time/Retired | Grid | Pts. |
|---|---|---|---|---|---|---|---|
| 1 | 3 | (Denmark) Christian Lundgaard | ART Grand Prix | 22 | 35:48.828 | 1 | 25 (4+2) |
| 2 | 2 | (United Kingdom) Max Fewtrell | ART Grand Prix | 22 | +3.712 | 3 | 18 |
| 3 | 11 | (United Kingdom) Jake Hughes | HWA Racelab | 22 | +13.912 | 7 | 15 |
| 4 | 21 | (Estonia) Jüri Vips | Hitech Grand Prix | 22 | +16.902 | 2 | 12 |
| 5 | 28 | (Russia) Robert Shwartzman | Prema Racing | 22 | +18.793 | 4 | 10 |
| 6 | 30 | (Brazil) Felipe Drugovich | Carlin Buzz Racing | 22 | +20.835 | 10 | 8 |
| 7 | 20 | (Italy) Leonardo Pulcini | Hitech Grand Prix | 22 | +21.917 | 11 | 6 |
| 8 | 26 | (New Zealand) Marcus Armstrong | Prema Racing | 22 | +24.223 | 13 | 4 |
| 9 | 14 | (Japan) Yuki Tsunoda | Jenzer Motorsport | 22 | +24.627 | 9 | 2 |
| 10 | 31 | (United States) Logan Sargeant | Carlin Buzz Racing | 22 | +27.997 | 19 | 1 |
| 11 | 27 | (India) Jehan Daruvala | Prema Racing | 22 | +30.241 | 17 | |
| 12 | 17 | (Canada) Devlin DeFrancesco | Trident | 22 | +30.344 | 25 | |
| 13 | 25 | (Spain) Sebastián Fernández | Campos Racing | 22 | +33.097 | 12 | |
| 14 | 19 | (Finland) Niko Kari | Trident | 22 | +33.442 | 5 | |
| 15 | 8 | (Switzerland) Fabio Scherer | Sauber Junior Team by Charouz | 22 | +33.734 | 22 | |
| 16 | 4 | (New Zealand) Liam Lawson | MP Motorsport | 22 | +34.565 | 20 | |
| 17 | 5 | (Finland) Simo Laaksonen | MP Motorsport | 22 | +34.714 | 23 | |
| 18 | 22 | (China) Ye Yifei | Hitech Grand Prix | 22 | +34.997 | 18 | |
| 19 | 10 | (Netherlands) Bent Viscaal | HWA Racelab | 22 | +35.347 | 26 | |
| 20 | 29 | (Japan) Teppei Natori | Carlin Buzz Racing | 22 | +38.182 | 21 | |
| 21 | 16 | (Germany) Andreas Estner | Jenzer Motorsport | 22 | +40.448 | 29 | |
| 22 | 9 | (United Kingdom) Raoul Hyman | Sauber Junior Team by Charouz | 22 | +42.939 | 15 | |
| 23 | 12 | (Iran) Keyvan Andres | HWA Racelab | 22 | +49.753 | 27 | |
| 24 | 24 | (Italy) Alessio Deledda | Campos Racing | 22 | +51.464 | 30 | |
| 25 | 15 | (Switzerland) Giorgio Carrara | Jenzer Motorsport | 22 | +53.280 | 28 | |
| 26 | 23 | (Australia) Alex Peroni | Campos Racing | 22 | +1:02.313 | 14 | |
| 27 | 6 | (Netherlands) Richard Verschoor | MP Motorsport | 21 | | 16 | |
| 28 | 1 | (Germany) David Beckmann | ART Grand Prix | 19 | | 8 | |
| DNF | 18 | (Brazil) Pedro Piquet | Trident | | | 6 | |
| DNF | 7 | (Germany) Lirim Zendeli | Sauber Junior Team by Charouz | | | 24 | |
Fastest lap set by Christian Lundgaard: 1:36.055 (lap 22)

=== Race 2 ===
| Pos. | No. | Driver | Team | Laps | Time/Retired | Grid | Pts. |
|---|---|---|---|---|---|---|---|
| 1 | 26 | (New Zealand) Marcus Armstrong | Prema Racing | 22 | 35:26.061 | 1 | 15 (2) |
| 2 | 20 | (Italy) Leonardo Pulcini | Hitech Grand Prix | 22 | +12.670 | 2 | 12 |
| 3 | 11 | (United Kingdom) Jake Hughes | HWA Racelab | 22 | +18.984 | 6 | 10 |
| 4 | 21 | (Estonia) Jüri Vips | Hitech Grand Prix | 22 | +24.401 | 5 | 8 |
| 5 | 3 | (Denmark) Christian Lundgaard | ART Grand Prix | 22 | +25.564 | 8 | 6 |
| 6 | 14 | (Japan) Yuki Tsunoda | Jenzer Motorsport | 22 | +25.889 | 9 | 4 |
| 7 | 27 | (India) Jehan Daruvala | Prema Racing | 22 | +29.557 | 11 | 2 |
| 8 | 31 | (United States) Logan Sargeant | Carlin Buzz Racing | 22 | +37.297 | 10 | 1 |
| 9 | 4 | (New Zealand) Liam Lawson | MP Motorsport | 22 | +38.326 | 16 | |
| 10 | 10 | (Netherlands) Bent Viscaal | HWA Racelab | 22 | +39.726 | 19 | |
| 11 | 17 | (Canada) Devlin DeFrancesco | Trident | 22 | +42.535 | 12 | |
| 12 | 19 | (Finland) Niko Kari | Trident | 22 | +44.271 | 14 | |
| 13 | 8 | (Switzerland) Fabio Scherer | Sauber Junior Team by Charouz | 22 | +44.730 | 15 | |
| 14 | 12 | (Iran) Keyvan Andres | HWA Racelab | 22 | +45.752 | 23 | |
| 15 | 16 | (Germany) Andreas Estner | Jenzer Motorsport | 22 | +46.061 | 21 | |
| 16 | 23 | (Australia) Alex Peroni | Campos Racing | 22 | +47.164 | 26 | |
| 17 | 6 | (Netherlands) Richard Verschoor | MP Motorsport | 22 | +47.437 | 27 | |
| 18 | 5 | (Finland) Simo Laaksonen | MP Motorsport | 22 | +48.276 | 17 | |
| 19 | 1 | (Germany) David Beckmann | ART Grand Prix | 22 | +48.515 | 28 | |
| 20 | 7 | (Germany) Lirim Zendeli | Sauber Junior Team by Charouz | 22 | +49.061 | 30 | |
| 21 | 15 | (Switzerland) Giorgio Carrara | Jenzer Motorsport | 22 | +53.521 | 25 | |
| 22 | 22 | (China) Ye Yifei | Hitech Grand Prix | 22 | +56.636 | 18 | |
| 23 | 25 | (Spain) Sebastián Fernández | Campos Racing | 22 | +58.296 | 13 | |
| 24 | 2 | (United Kingdom) Max Fewtrell | ART Grand Prix | 22 | +58.550 | 7 | |
| 25 | 9 | (United Kingdom) Raoul Hyman | Sauber Junior Team by Charouz | 22 | +64.567 | 22 | |
| 26 | 24 | (Italy) Alessio Deledda | Campos Racing | 22 | +66.260 | 24 | |
| 27 | 18 | (Brazil) Pedro Piquet | Trident | 22 | +71.427 | 29 | |
| DNF | 28 | (Russia) Robert Shwartzman | Prema Racing | | | 4 | |
| DNF | 30 | (Brazil) Felipe Drugovich | Carlin Buzz Racing | | | 3 | |
| DNF | 29 | (Japan) Teppei Natori | Carlin Buzz Racing | | | 20 | |
Fastest lap set by Marcus Armstrong: 1:35.307 (lap 4)

== See also ==
- 2019 Hungarian Grand Prix
- 2019 Budapest Formula 2 round

| Previous round: 2019 Silverstone Formula 3 round | FIA Formula 3 Championship; 2019 season | Next round: 2019 Spa-Francorchamps Formula 3 round |
| Previous round: 2018 Budapest GP3 Series round | Budapest Formula 3 round | Next round: 2020 Budapest Formula 3 round |
