= 2017 SMP F4 Championship =

Motor racing competition

The 2017 SMP F4 Championship is the third season of the SMP F4 Championship. The series is also known as FIA North-European Zone (NEZ) championship.

Among the team partaking in the championship are SMP Racing (who have been partaking in the series since its inception), MP Motorsport, in its second season, and debutants FA Racing Team, ALM Motorsport, Lappalainen Racing Team and AKK Academy.

Despite more teams running the cars, the so-called single-operation remains. All cars have identical set-up including tyre pressure.

The series is a FIA North-European Zone (NEZ) championship and drivers must hold a valid annual license issued by one of the NEZ ASNs to score points. NEZ Council, however, agreed in its meeting in 30 November 2016 to allow KNAF license holders to score points in the championship again in 2017 season. The exception is valid for 2017 season only and Dutch drivers aren't eligible to any other NEZ cups or championships.

Several drivers outside North-European Zone and the Netherlands hold licenses issued by zone ASNs and are allowed to score points: Guillem Pujeu and Xavier Lloveras represent Finland (AKK Motorsports), Gülhüseyn Abdullayev Russia (RAF) and Lukas Dunner Netherlands (KNAF).

== Drivers ==
Team	No.	Driver	Rounds
(Netherlands) MP Motorsport	2	(France) Tristan Charpentier	1, 3
(Netherlands) MP Motorsport	5	(Denmark) Christian Lundgaard	All
(Netherlands) MP Motorsport	8	(Austria) Lukas Dunner	All
(Netherlands) MP Motorsport	12	(Netherlands) Bent Viscaal	All
(Netherlands) MP Motorsport	14	(Netherlands) John Peters	1–3
(Netherlands) MP Motorsport	17	(Malaysia) Nazim Azman	7
(Netherlands) MP Motorsport	19	(Spain) Marta García	5
(Russia) SMP Racing	3	(Russia) Milen Ponomarenko	1–6
(Russia) SMP Racing	6	(Cyprus) Vladimiros Tziortzis	All
(Russia) SMP Racing	7	(Russia) Nikita Volegov	All
(Russia) SMP Racing	10	(Russia) Aleksandr Smolyar	All
(Russia) SMP Racing	17	(Russia) Nerses Isaakyan	6
(Russia) SMP Racing	23	(Russia) Roman Lebedev	3
(Russia) SMP Racing	25	(Russia) Nikita Sitnikov	6
(Russia) SMP Racing	27	(Russia) Ivan Shvetsov	4–7
(Russia) SMP Racing	55	(Azerbaijan) Gülhüseyn Abdullayev	All
(Russia) SMP Racing	57	(Russia) Michael Belov	All
(Russia) SMP Racing	88	(Russia) Ivan Berets	All
(Spain) FA Racing Team	18	(Spain) Guillem Pujeu	1–6
(Spain) FA Racing Team	21	(Spain) Xavier Lloveras	1–5
(Finland) AKK Academy	22	(Finland) Sami-Matti Trogen	All
(Finland) AKK Academy	32	(Finland) Tuomas Haapalainen	All
(Finland) AKK Academy	76	(Finland) Elias Niskanen	1–5
(Estonia) ALM Motorsport	33	(Estonia) Jan-Erik Meikup	1–5
(Estonia) ALM Motorsport	44	(Estonia) Sten Piirimägi	1, 3–5, 7
(Finland) Lappalainen Team	50	(Finland) Juuso Puhakka	All
(Finland) Lappalainen Team	77	(Finland) Konsta Lappalainen	7

== Race calendar ==
Round		Circuit	Date	Pole position	Fastest lap	Winning driver	Winning team	Supporting
1	R1	(Russia) Sochi Autodrom, Sochi	19 May	(Spain) Xavier Lloveras	(Netherlands) Bent Viscaal	(Spain) Xavier Lloveras	(Spain) FA Racing Team	Mitjet 2L
1	R2	(Russia) Sochi Autodrom, Sochi	20 May		(Denmark) Christian Lundgaard	(Denmark) Christian Lundgaard	(Netherlands) MP Motorsport	Mitjet 2L
1	R3	(Russia) Sochi Autodrom, Sochi	20 May	(Russia) Aleksandr Smolyar	(Denmark) Christian Lundgaard	(Denmark) Christian Lundgaard	(Netherlands) MP Motorsport	Mitjet 2L
2	R4	(Russia) Smolensk Ring, Verhnedneprovsky	27 May	(Spain) Xavier Lloveras	(Denmark) Christian Lundgaard	(Finland) Juuso Puhakka	(Finland) Lappalainen Team	Russian Circuit Racing Series
2	R5	(Russia) Smolensk Ring, Verhnedneprovsky	28 May		(Denmark) Christian Lundgaard	(Russia) Nikita Volegov	(Russia) SMP Racing	Russian Circuit Racing Series
2	R6	(Russia) Smolensk Ring, Verhnedneprovsky	28 May	(Finland) Tuomas Haapalainen	(Russia) Aleksandr Smolyar	(Finland) Tuomas Haapalainen	(Finland) AKK Academy	Russian Circuit Racing Series
3	R7	(Finland) Ahvenisto Race Circuit, Hämeenlinna	3 June	(Finland) Sami-Matti Trogen	(Finland) Juuso Puhakka	(Netherlands) Bent Viscaal	(Netherlands) MP Motorsport	
3	R8	(Finland) Ahvenisto Race Circuit, Hämeenlinna	3 June		(Russia) Michael Belov	(Russia) Nikita Volegov	(Russia) SMP Racing	
3	R9	(Finland) Ahvenisto Race Circuit, Hämeenlinna	4 June	(Denmark) Christian Lundgaard	(Denmark) Christian Lundgaard	(Denmark) Christian Lundgaard	(Netherlands) MP Motorsport	
4	R10	(Estonia) auto24ring, Audru	1 July	(Spain) Xavier Lloveras	(Denmark) Christian Lundgaard	(Denmark) Christian Lundgaard	(Netherlands) MP Motorsport	Estonian Grand Prix
4	R11	(Estonia) auto24ring, Audru	1 July		(Russia) Nikita Volegov	(Denmark) Christian Lundgaard	(Netherlands) MP Motorsport	Estonian Grand Prix
4	R12	(Estonia) auto24ring, Audru	2 July	(Denmark) Christian Lundgaard	(Estonia) Sten Piirimägi	(Netherlands) Bent Viscaal	(Netherlands) MP Motorsport	Estonian Grand Prix
5	R13	(Russia) Moscow Raceway, Volokolamsk	15 July	(Denmark) Christian Lundgaard	(Finland) Juuso Puhakka	(Denmark) Christian Lundgaard	(Netherlands) MP Motorsport	Russian Endurance Challenge
5	R14	(Russia) Moscow Raceway, Volokolamsk	16 July		(Denmark) Christian Lundgaard	(Denmark) Christian Lundgaard	(Netherlands) MP Motorsport	Russian Endurance Challenge
5	R15	(Russia) Moscow Raceway, Volokolamsk	16 July	(Denmark) Christian Lundgaard	(Finland) Juuso Puhakka	(Finland) Tuomas Haapalainen	(Finland) AKK Academy	Russian Endurance Challenge
6	R16	(Russia) Moscow Raceway, Volokolamsk	19 August	(Denmark) Christian Lundgaard	(Denmark) Christian Lundgaard	(Denmark) Christian Lundgaard	(Netherlands) MP Motorsport	Russian Circuit Racing Series
6	R17	(Russia) Moscow Raceway, Volokolamsk	19 August		(Denmark) Christian Lundgaard	(Denmark) Christian Lundgaard	(Netherlands) MP Motorsport	Russian Circuit Racing Series
6	R18	(Russia) Moscow Raceway, Volokolamsk	20 August	(Denmark) Christian Lundgaard	(Denmark) Christian Lundgaard	(Finland) Tuomas Haapalainen	(Finland) AKK Academy	Russian Circuit Racing Series
7	R19	(Netherlands) TT Circuit Assen, Assen	21 October	(Russia) Aleksandr Smolyar	(Finland) Tuomas Haapalainen	(Netherlands) Bent Viscaal	(Netherlands) MP Motorsport	Formido Finaleraces
7	R20	(Netherlands) TT Circuit Assen, Assen	22 October		(Russia) Aleksandr Smolyar	(Netherlands) Bent Viscaal	(Netherlands) MP Motorsport	Formido Finaleraces
7	R21	(Netherlands) TT Circuit Assen, Assen	22 October	(Denmark) Christian Lundgaard	(Russia) Aleksandr Smolyar	(Denmark) Christian Lundgaard	(Netherlands) MP Motorsport	Formido Finaleraces

== Championship standings ==
Points are awarded to the top 10 classified finishers in each race. No points are awarded for pole position or fastest lap.

Races	Position, points per race									
Races	1st	2nd	3rd	4th	5th	6th	7th	8th	9th	10th
Races 1 & 3	25	18	15	12	10	8	6	4	2	1
Race 2	15	12	10	8	6	4	2	1		

=== Drivers' Championship ===
Pos	Driver	SOC (Russia)			SMO (Russia)			AHV (Finland)			AUD (Estonia)			MSC1 (Russia)			MSC2 (Russia)			ASS (Netherlands)			Pts
1	(Denmark) Christian Lundgaard	5	1	1	2	6	3	7	7	1	1	1	Ret	1	1	3	1	1	11	Ret	2	1	292
2	(Netherlands) Bent Viscaal	2	8	2	8	5	8	1	Ret	8	9	14	1	4	4	7	5	6	3	1	1	2	218
3	(Russia) Aleksandr Smolyar	3	3	19	3	3	4	3	3	4	6	5	2	2	3	8	6	17	5	2	3	6	217
4	(Finland) Tuomas Haapalainen	4	5	5	11	7	1	11	10	5	5	15	3	6	2	1	2	2	1	8	7	4	208
5	(Russia) Nikita Volegov	Ret	11	3	5	1	6	2	1	6	4	2	15	5	Ret	4	7	8	10	7	4	12	157
6	(Spain) Xavier Lloveras	1	2	4	4	2	2	6	6	3	2	3	6	11	7	15							156
7	(Finland) Juuso Puhakka	6	12	9	1	DSQ	5	10	5	2	3	6	Ret	10	9	2	10	7	7	4	8	8	136
8	(Russia) Michael Belov	9	9	8	9	4	Ret	4	4	9	DNS	Ret	4	7	6	5	Ret	5	4	10	13	3	104
9	(Finland) Sami-Matti Trogen	17	15	12	10	12	14	8	2	7	11	12	Ret	3	5	9	4	4	14	5	9	5	86
10	(Cyprus) Vladimiros Tziortzis	Ret	4	16	6	Ret	9	16	9	10	7	4	12	14	11	14	3	3	2	Ret	10	11	76
11	(Estonia) Sten Piirimägi	8	7	13				13	12	14	8	9	5	8	13	12				6	6	7	42
12	(Estonia) Jan-Erik Meikup	11	18	7	7	9	7	5	8	12	14	13	DSQ	WD	WD	WD							29
13	(Austria) Lukas Dunner	10	13	10				Ret	Ret	13	10	7	13	9	12	10	8	9	8	Ret	5	9	24
14	(Finland) Elias Niskanen	7	10	6	15	10	10	9	Ret	11	12	18	9	Ret	14	17							19
15	(Finland) Konsta Lappalainen																			3	12	10	16
16	(Spain) Guillem Pujeu	14	19	17	12	Ret	13	18	15	Ret	Ret	8	7	12	8	13	12	10	6				16
17	(Spain) Marta García													17	Ret	6							8
18	(Russia) Ivan Berets	13	14	14	13	11	12	12	11	15	13	10	8	13	10	11	14	14	13	Ret	11	Ret	5
19	(Netherlands) John Peters	12	6	11	17	Ret	16	15	13	DNS													4
20	(Azerbaijan) Gülhüseyn Abdullayev	Ret	EX	18	16	8	11	17	16	16	16	11	10	15	Ret	16	15	15	16	Ret	15	14	2
21	(Russia) Ivan Shvetsov										Ret	17	14	Ret	15	19	9	11	12	Ret	DNS	DNS	2
22	(Russia) Nerses Isaakyan																11	12	9				2
23	(Malaysia) Nazim Azman																			9	16	15	2
24	(Russia) Nikita Sitnikov																13	13	17				0
25	(Russia) Roman Lebedev							14	14	17													0
26	(Russia) Milen Ponomarenko	15	16	15	14	Ret	15	WD	WD	WD	15	16	Ret	16	16	18	16	16	15				0
27	(France) Tristan Charpentier	16	17	Ret				WD	WD	WD													0
Pos	Driver	SOC (Russia)			SMO (Russia)			AHV (Finland)			AUD (Estonia)			MSC1 (Russia)			MSC2 (Russia)			ASS (Netherlands)			Pts
