= Christian Lundgaard =

Danish racing driver (born 2001)

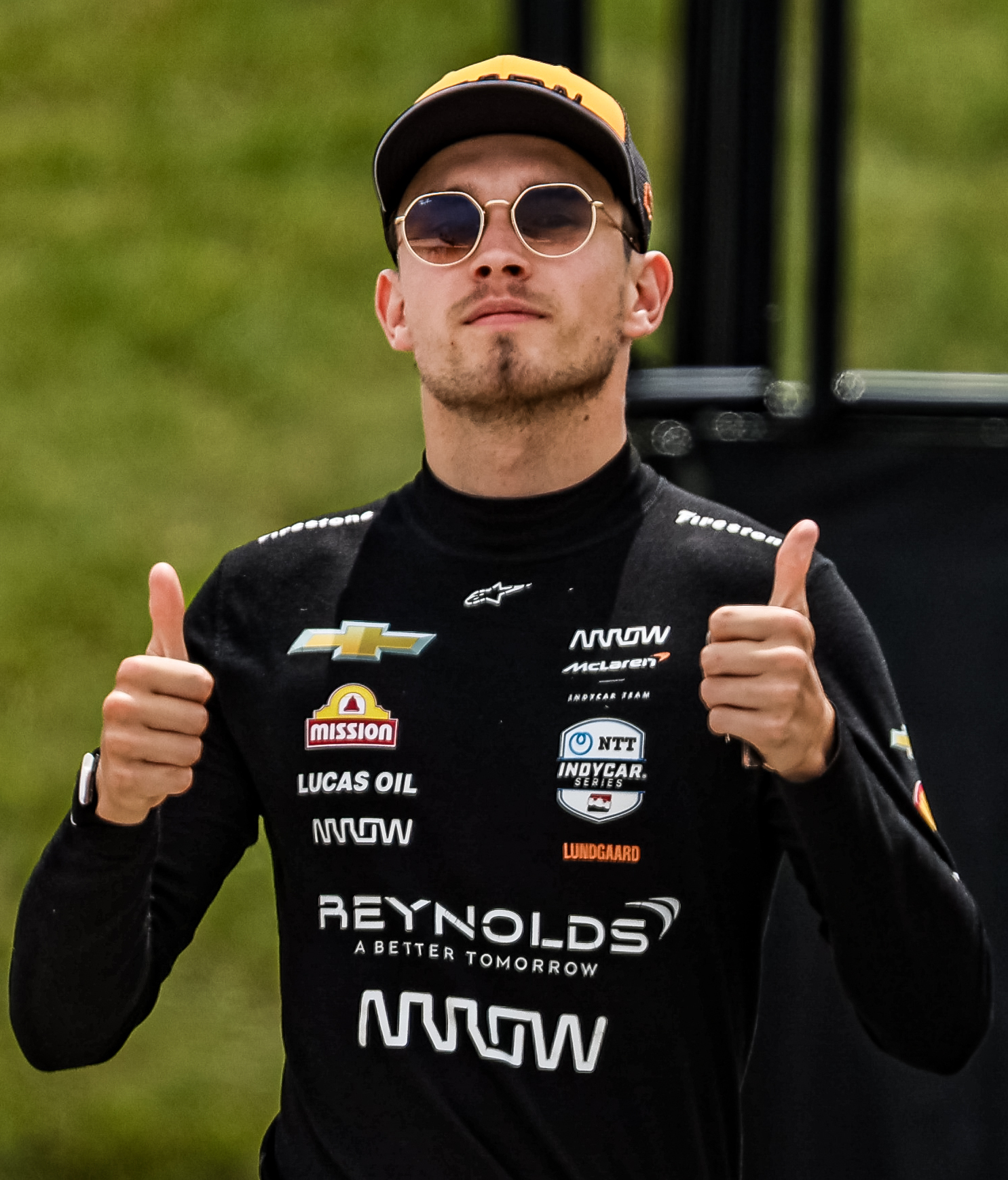
- Lundgaard at Road America in 2025
- Nationality: (Denmark) Danish
- Born: 23 July 2001 (age 25) Hedensted, Denmark
- Relatives: Henrik Lundgaard (father); Daniel Lundgaard (brother)
- Categorisation: FIA Gold (2025–2026); FIA Platinum (2027–)

IndyCar Series career
- 87 races run over 6 years
- Team: No. 9 (Chip Ganassi Racing)
- Best finish: 3rd (2026)
- First race: 2021 Big Machine Spiked Coolers Grand Prix (Indianapolis Road Course)
- Last race: 2026 Mission Grand Prix of Monterey (Laguna Seca)
- First win: 2023 Honda Indy Toronto (Exhibition Place)
- Last win: 2026 XPEL Grand Prix at Road America (Road America)
Wins	Podiums	Poles
3	16	4

Previous series
- 2019–21 2019 2018 2018 2018 2017 2017 2017: FIA Formula 2 Championship; FIA Formula 3 Championship; GP3 Series; Formula Renault Eurocup; Formula Renault 2.0 NEC; SMP F4 Championship; F4 Spanish Championship; F4 Danish Championship

Championship titles
- 2017 2017: SMP F4 Championship; F4 Spanish Championship

Christian Lundgaard (Danish: [ˈkʰʁestjæn ˈlɔnˀˌkɒˀ, ˈkʰʁæs-]; born 23 July 2001) is a Danish professional racing driver who drives the No. 9 Honda for Chip Ganassi Racing in the IndyCar Series. He previously competed with Rahal Letterman Lanigan Racing in the No. 45 car and with Arrow McLaren in the No. 7 car. He was the 2022 IndyCar Series Rookie of the Year, and was a member of the Alpine Academy from 2017 until 2022.

Lundgaard began his single-seater career in 2017, where he won the F4 Spanish and SMP F4 Championship in his debut year. In 2018, he made a move to the Formula Renault Eurocup, where he placed runner-up to Max Fewtrell. He secured a promotion to ART Grand Prix in the 2019 FIA Formula 3 Championship where he ended 6th. Lundgaard continued with ART Grand Prix for the 2020 Formula 2 Championship and took two wins to place 7th overall. However, a poor 2021 season saw him make a switch to IndyCar for 2022.

Lundgaard won his first IndyCar race at the 2023 Honda Indy Toronto, becoming the first Danish driver to ever win an IndyCar race. During his IndyCar career, he also won the 2026 Sonsio Grand Prix and the 2026 XPEL Grand Prix at Road America.

== Junior career ==
=== Karting ===
Lundgaard began karting professionally in 2012. He competed all across Europe and collected three major titles along the way, including the 2015 CIK-FIA Karting European Championship. In December 2016, Lundgaard was ranked fifth on a list compiled by Motorsport.com of the top ten karting drivers with future potential.

=== Lower formulae ===
In 2017, Lundgaard made his single-seater debut in the SMP F4 and Spanish F4 championships with MP Motorsport, at the age of fifteen. In SMP F4, he claimed nine victories, seven pole positions and ten fastest laps and claimed the championship with one round to go. In the Spanish F4 Championship, Lundgaard won six races, including all the races at Aragón to become champion.

=== Formula Renault Eurocup ===
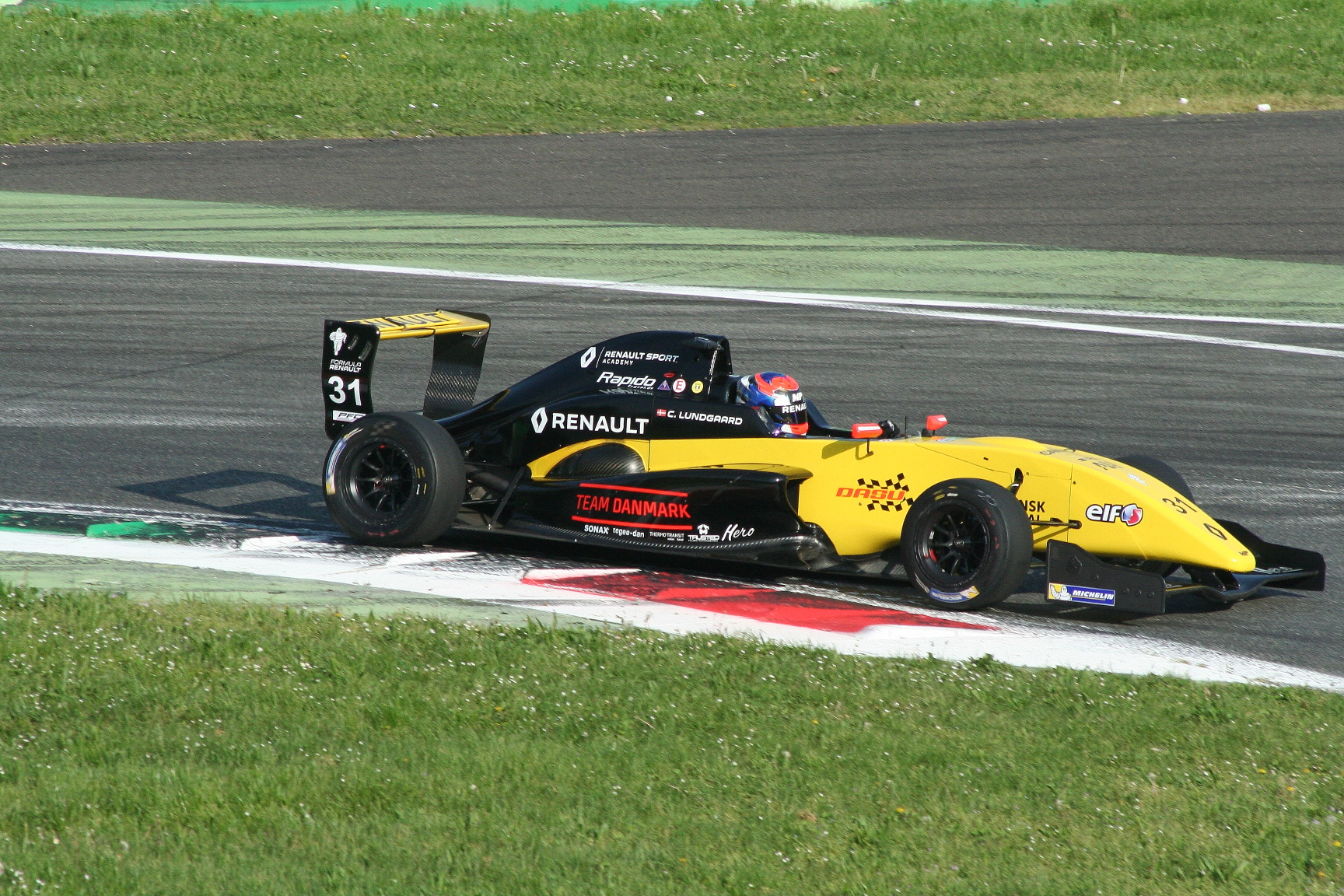
Lundgaard racing in the Formula Renault Eurocup in 2018

In 2018, after testing with them at the post-season test, Lundgaard reunited with MP Motorsport for the Eurocup championship. His first podium of the season came with a third place during the second race at Paul Ricard. His win would not be too far away, as he took his first victory in the series during the next round at Monza, defended from Lorenzo Colombo and duly taking the lead of the championship. A retirement and four consecutive fifth-placed finishes followed, before he was back on the podium during the second race at the Red Bull Ring. The next round at Spa-Francorchamps, saw Lundgaard win the first race and take the Eurocup lead. A double podium including a win at the Hungaroring saw him into serious championship contention. However, a double retirement at the Hockenheimring left his championship chances dented and trailing leader and fellow Renault junior Max Fewtrell by 36.5 points heading into the final round. Despite "taking more risk" to claim a win and a second place at the final round in Barcelona, he was unable to overhaul the points tally of Fewtrell, leaving the British driver to be crowned champion by 17.5 points. In an article by Motorsport.com, Lundgaard was ranked thirteenth of their top-twenty junior drivers in 2018.

=== GP3 Series ===
In June 2018, Lundgaard joined MP for the third round of the 2018 championship at Paul Ricard. In December, he returned for the final post-season test, driving for ART Grand Prix.

=== FIA Formula 3 Championship ===
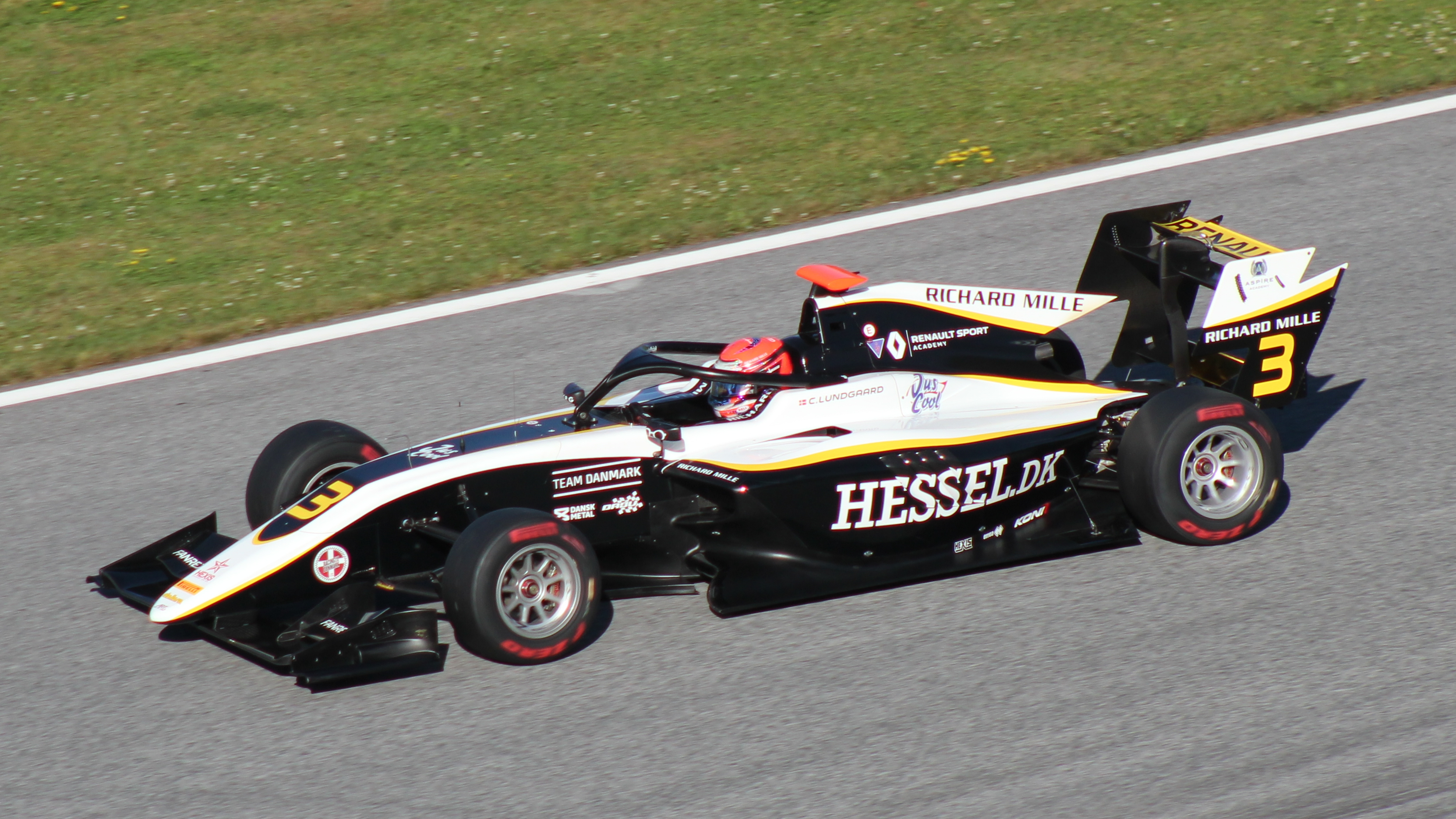
Lundgaard driving the Dallara F3 2019 during the 2019 Spielberg Formula 3 round.

Following his success in Formula Renault, Lundgaard was linked with a seat at ART Grand Prix for the inaugural FIA Formula 3 Championship. In January 2019, the French outfit confirmed Lundgaard would race with them, alongside Eurocup rival Max Fewtrell and David Beckmann. Before the season, Lundgaard competed in the last round of the Asian F3 Winter series.

During the first round at Barcelona, Lundgaard qualified second for his first race. He passed polesitter Robert Shwartzman at the start and never looked back to win the race, but was demoted five seconds for exceeding the virtual safety car delta. Nevertheless, it was his first podium in Formula 3. He followed it up with sixth in Race 2. The next two rounds were poor for Lundgaard, he retired in the first race at Le Castellet due to a broken suspension, but recovered to fifteenth the next day. At Austria, Lundgaard qualified fifth but was disqualified from qualifying due to a physio issue. Contact with Yifei Ye saw him only finish 26th in the first race, and climbed to seventeenth in the second.

In Silverstone, Lundgaard started fourth in Race 1 and passed Marcus Armstrong at the start but would eventually fall to seventh. Starting second in Race 2, he was passed by both Pedro Piquet and Leonardo Pulcini on the final lap. Lundgaard lost more positions but benefitted from a collision in the end to secure fifth place. In the Hungaroring, Lundgaard had a breakthrough weekend, topping practice and then later taking his first ever F3 pole. He had a dominant race and led teammate Fewtrell home to take his win in the series. In Race 2, he claimed fifth place, which kept him in championship contention. In Spa-Francorchamps, Lundgaard qualified all the way down in 13th, but finished fourth in both races.

In Monza, Lundgaard took his second pole of the year. He would not score any more points for the rest of the season. In Race 1, Lundgaard was overtaken by Lirim Zendeli at the start of the race. However, on lap three, he made contact with Zendeli, which damaged Lundgaard's front wing. He pitted for a front wing change and finished thirteenth. In Race 2, Lundgaard progressed to ninth place, missing out on a point. In Sochi, Lundgaard qualified fifth, but was hit at the back by Jüri Vips and fell near the back. He improve to finish fourteenth, and then in Race 2 finished tenth. Lundgaard ended the championship in sixth place with 97 points, as the leading ART Grand Prix driver. He scored a win and another podium during the season. Lundgaard then took part in post-season testing in October, where he topped the first and second days.

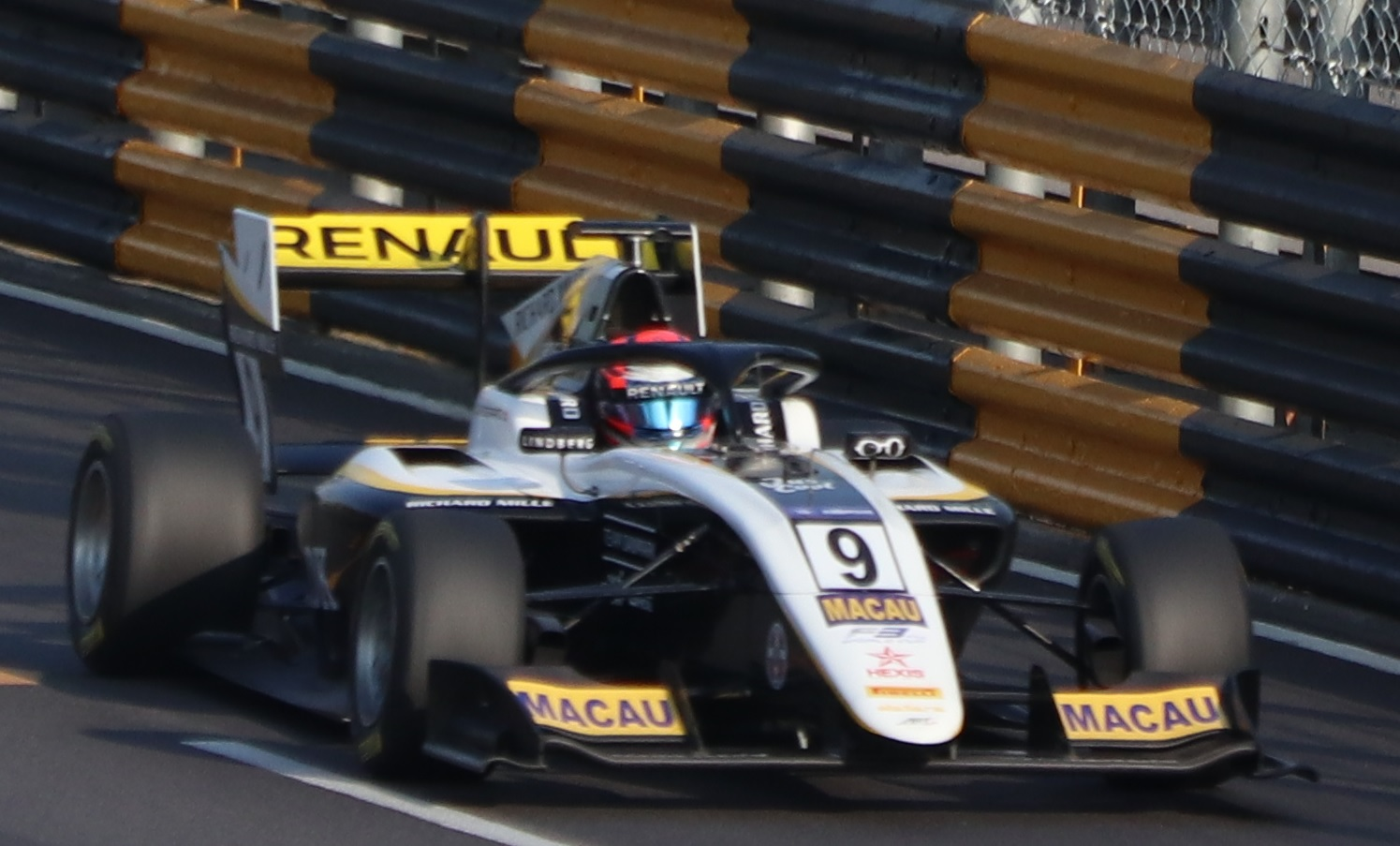
Lundgaard at the 2019 Macau Grand Prix

Lundgaard reunited with ART to contest the Macau Grand Prix, which saw him finish third in the qualification race and fourth in the main event.

=== FIA Formula 2 Championship ===
==== 2019 ====
In November 2019, it was announced Lundgaard would partake in the season finale at Yas Marina with Trident, replacing Ralph Boschung. Lundgaard finished the races in fourteenth and twelfth, ending 23rd in the championship.

==== 2020 ====
After taking part in post-season testing with ART Grand Prix, In January, it was announced that Lundgaard would drive for the French outfit during the full 2020 Formula 2 season alongside 2019 Formula 3 runner-up Marcus Armstrong. Lundgaard missed the whole of pre-season testing at the Bahrain International Circuit due to an outbreak of COVID-19 in his hotel, therefore he was forced to be quarantined for several days. Due to the mentioned virus, the season would eventually be postponed to July. During the lockdown, Lundgaard participated in various 2020 Virtual Grands Prix for Renault.

For the first round at the Red Bull Ring, Lundgaard qualified fourth and finished in the same position, taking advantage of a car issue for Guanyu Zhou and a mistake for Mick Schumacher late in the race. He finished the sprint race where he started, in fifth place, marking a solid Formula 2 debut for Lundgaard. During the second Red Bull Ring round, he took eighth place in qualifying. He put a small overtaking masterclass in early wet part of the feature race, moving up to fourth at one point, but he would eventually finish sixth. In the sprint race from third, Lundgaard moved past teammate Armstrong at the start, and then later on Dan Ticktum. He then came through for his maiden F2 win, winning by two seconds. On his performance so far, Lundgaard said that it was "better than expected" following missing testing. His strong showing saw him second in the standings, five points behind leader Robert Shwartzman.

Lundgaard qualified sixth at Hungary and moved up to fourth at the start of the feature race. However, when trying to pass Luca Ghiotto, he hit his rear tyre, causing damage to Lundgaard's front wing and puncturing his tyre. He eventually retired on lap ten. Lundgaard made a recovery charge in the sprint race and finished thirteenth. In Silverstone, Lundgaard started third due to Callum Ilott stalling. Nikita Mazepin passed him at the start but eventually moved back into third after dispatching polesitter Felipe Drugovich. He was in second place during the final stages of the race, but during the final three laps was passed by Guanyu Zhou and Yuki Tsunoda on fresher tyres, falling to fourth place. In the sprint race, Lundgaard made a good start, jumping to second on the first lap. A spin for Ilott mid-race saw Lundgaard pit for tyres, he charged back to second late in the race but ran out of time to catch eventual winner Dan Ticktum. In the second Silverstone round, Lundgaard qualified second missing out on pole to Ilott, admitting that a mistake costed a chance of a maiden pole. In the feature race, he dropped to fourth at the start but quickly moved back to second shortly. He eventually finished in that position, nine seconds behind winner Ilott. In the sprint race while running seventh, Lundgaard's front-left tyre punctured on lap sixteen which dropped him to last place. In the Barcelona round, Lundgaard had an inferior weekend, he finished both races in eleventh place.

In Spa-Francorchamps, Lundgaard qualified in a disappointing seventeenth place and finished the feature race in the same position. He had a lightning start in the sprint race, moving to ninth by lap four. He eventually finished the race in seventh place, and despite the result, fell out of the top five in the standings. In Monza, Lundgaard started fourth, and moved to second after the pit stops after Ilott's slow pit stop. On the third last lap however, Ghiotto passed him and Lundgaard eventually finished in third place. Lundgaard charged to third place in the sprint race, benefitting on retirements from Tsunoda and Zhou. However, he was promoted to second place after Ticktum was disqualified. In Mugello, Lundgaard claimed his maiden pole, five thousandths of a second ahead of Ticktum. He led majority of the race until the safety car restart on lap 31 of 33, where Lundgaard was passed by both Hitech drivers on fresher tyres. His rivals later also overtook him, dropping him to sixth when the chequered flag fell. In the sprint race, Lundgaard passed Jüri Vips and Artem Markelov to storm into the lead by the first corner. He eventually won the race by an astonishing 14 seconds and moved into third in the championship.

In Sochi, Lundgaard qualified in sixth place. However, a slow getaway saw him drop down the order, before being hit by Pedro Piquet saw Lundgaard's race come to a close. A red-flagged sprint race saw Lundgaard end 13th. Heading into the final two rounds of the season, Lundgaard sat fourth in the standings, 46 points behind leader Schumacher. In the first Bahrain round, Lundgaard finished the feature race in nineteenth, but stormed through the field to finish sixth in the sprint race. In the final round of the season, Lundgaard finished both races out of the points, as during the feature race he stalled from sixth on the grid whilst also causing a small controversy of unlapping the race leaders while battling. Lundgaard finished 7th in the championship with 149 points, massively outscoring teammate Armstrong's 52 whilst helping ART finish fifth in the championship.

==== 2021 ====
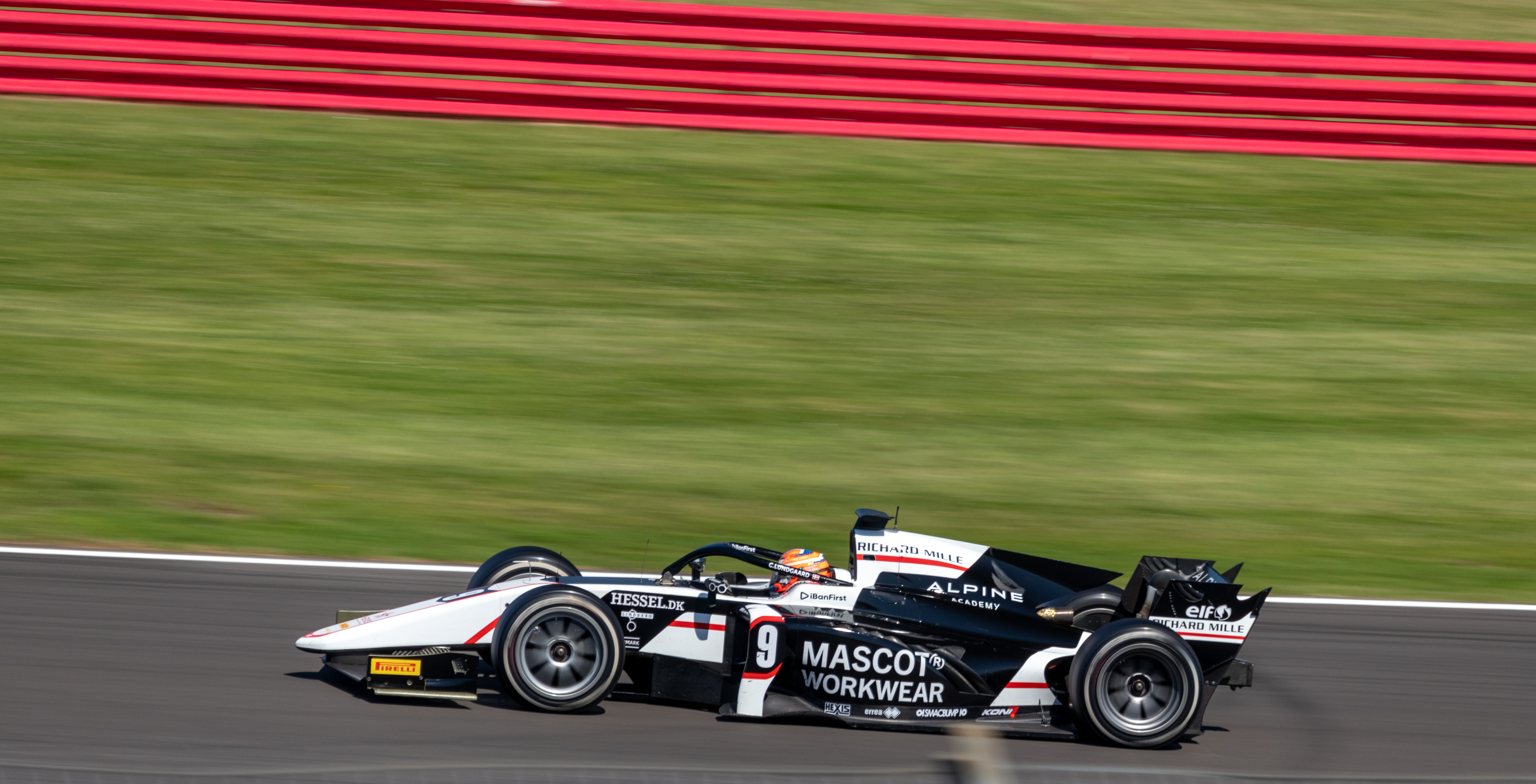
Lundgaard driving the Dallara F2 2018 during the 2021 Silverstone Formula 2 round.

Lundgaard was retained by ART Grand Prix for the 2021 FIA Formula 2 season. On his new deal, he aimed to improve on consistency and fight for the title. However, his season would not go as planned.

At the Bahrain season opener, Lundgaard qualified second behind fellow Alpine junior Guanyu Zhou, losing out by 0.003 seconds. He described that his small deficit to Zhou "hurts". In sprint race 1, Lundgaard made up places at the start and finished sixth. In sprint race 2, Lundgaard dropped from fifth to seventh, then clipped the back of Lirim Zendeli whilst trying to overtake him, causing a puncture for Zendeli's car. Lundgaard was handed a ten-second penalty, which was served during the safety car. Lundgaard would eventually finish in second. He did not appear on the podium due to a post-race penalty caused by a safety car infringement, but the penalty was later rescinded and his finishing position was reinstated to second. In the feature race, Lundgaard took the lead on softer tyres, but lost the lead on lap thirteen to Piastri. Following a safety car restart on lap 19, Lundgaard lost positions to other drivers on fresher tyres and finished tenth, later dropping to twelfth due to a safety car infringement.

In Monaco, Lundgaard qualified eighth, starting third in sprint race 1. He overtook Felipe Drugovich at the start but on lap twelve, smoke started pouring out the rear of his car, in which Drugovich described driving behind Lundgaard "a nightmare". Three laps later, Lundgaard retired at Mirabeau. In sprint race 2, Lundgaard collided with the wall at Mirabeau but was able to continue, only to retire with a mechanical issue later in the race. In the feature race, Lundgaard finished tenth, but a post race penalty caused by speeding in the pit lane resulted in a time penalty which dropped him to twelfth. He then stated that "Nothing went my way" in the point-less round.

Lundgaard's poor form continued in Baku, where he qualified twelfth, but was handed a three place grid drop due to impeding Zhou in qualifying. In the sprint race 1, Lundgaard improved to an 11th-place finish. In sprint race 2, a collision with Felipe Drugovich led to a DNF on lap eight, whilst he was running in the top-ten. In the feature race, a Lundgaard succeeded in the overcut strategy and finished ninth. In Silverstone, Lundgaard qualified 10th, earning him reverse grid pole for the sprint race 1. A slow start saw him fall to third, losing positions to Robert Shwartzman and Jüri Vips. He would remain in third for the remainder of the race, scoring his first podium since the opening round. In sprint race 2, Lundgaard stalled on the formation lap, resulting in a pit lane start and recovered to thirteenth. In the feature race, during his pit stop, Lundgaard's rear-left wheel came off from the car in the pit lane, and he was penalised with a ten-second penalty. In a race where all runners finished, Lundgaard finished 21st. By the halfway point of the season, Lundgaard was twelfth in the standings, with 29 points.

Despite making his IndyCar debut, Lundgaard was confirmed to finish the 2021 F2 season. In Monza, Lundgaard qualified a season-worst nineteenth. In sprint race 1, Lundgaard finished fourth, but a post-race penalty for Shwartzman promoted him to third. In the sprint race 2, Lundgaard finished fourteenth after a spin on the first lap. In the feature race, an alternate strategy and a late safety car enabled him to finish eleventh, and a post-race disqualification of Richard Verschoor promoted him to tenth. In Russia, Lundgaard qualified twelfth, and took points in both races finishing seventh and ninth.

In Jeddah, Lundgaard qualified fourth. Lundgaard eventually finished seventh following a battle with teammate Pourchaire, Piastri and Jehan Daruvala. A post-race penalty for Daruvala from leaving the track and gaining an advantage promoted Lundgaard to sixth. In the second sprint race, Lundgaard made up two places from fifth to third at the start and fought for the lead, but was given a 5-second time penalty for cutting a corner whilst fighting Bent Viscaal. Lundgaard would be classified fifteenth after a crash from Liam Lawson brought out a safety car at the end of the race. In the feature race, Lundgaard dropped to eighth at the start, making up one position on Marcus Armstrong to finish seventh.

In Abu Dhabi, Lundgaard's final Formula 2 round, he qualified twelfth. In sprint race 1, a collision with Viscaal led to a fifteenth-place finish. In the sprint race 2, a puncture caused by a collision with Roy Nissany led to an eighteenth-place finish. In the feature race, early front wing damage led to a fifteenth-place finish, resulting in his second point-less weekend during the season. Lundgaard ended the championship in twelfth place with fifty points, his worst placing in a full-time series.

== Formula One ==
Prior to entering IndyCar, Lundgaard's long-term career goal was to compete in Formula 1.

In March 2017, Lundgaard was signed to the Renault Sport Academy. Following the 2019 FIA Formula 3 Championship, Lundgaard was invited to a private Formula One test at the Hungaroring, where he got his first taste of a Formula One car testing the Renault R.S.17. He would also get another test with the R.S.17 later at Circuito de Jerez in November.

In October 2020, Lundgaard and fellow academy member Guanyu Zhou got another F1 test, testing the Renault R.S.18 at the Bahrain International Circuit. Lundgaard then stated on his experience that "he felt comfortable straight away on his first run".

Lundgaard was included in the lineup of the team's academy when it was rebranded to Alpine F1 Team in 2021. In addition to that, Lundgaard was given a role as a simulator driver in the team for 2021. He tested the 2018 Renault R.S.18 in June at Silverstone, following his Baku weekend. Lundgaard left the academy before the 2022 season, as he made his transition to IndyCar.

== IndyCar ==
=== Rahal Letterman Lanigan Racing (2021–2024) ===
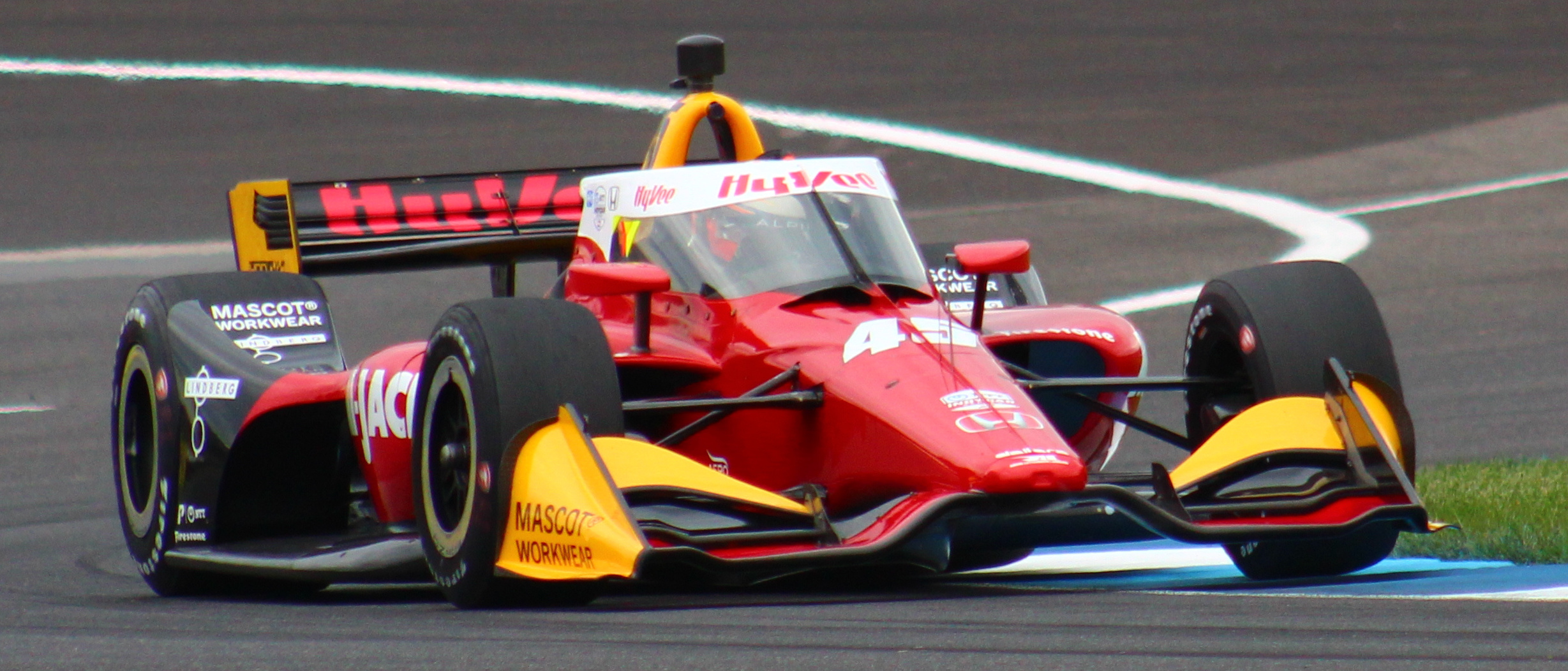
Christian Lundgaard driving for Rahal Letterman Lanigan Racing at the Indianapolis Motor Speedway in 2021.

==== 2021 ====
In July 2021, Lundgaard tested an IndyCar with Rahal Letterman Lanigan Racing at Barber Motorsports Park. A month later, he joined the team for his IndyCar debut at the 2021 Big Machine Spiked Coolers Grand Prix at Indianapolis Motor Speedway. On debut, Lundgaard qualified an impressive fourth and finished the race in twelfth.

==== 2022 ====
On 20 October 2021, it was announced that Lundgaard would join Rahal Letterman Lanigan Racing on a multi-year IndyCar deal, starting from the 2022 season. He partnered Jack Harvey and Graham Rahal throughout the season. Lundgaard stated that there was "always a chance for F1" despite spending a season in IndyCar. Lundgaard made his full time IndyCar debut at the 2022 Firestone Grand Prix of St. Petersburg, qualifying in fifteenth. He went on to finish the race in eleventh place, after slipping outside of the top-ten during the last few laps of the Grand Prix. The next race at the Texas Motor Speedway saw Lundgaard qualify a low 25th at his first oval track, but retired after contact with Colton Herta. The third round at the 2022 Acura Grand Prix of Long Beach brought more disappointment, as on lap 31 he ran out of fuel while making his way to the pits, and was left two laps down to finish eighteenth. The fifth round in the 2022 GMR Grand Prix saw Lundgaard qualify eighth, but lost positions at the start as he went off onto the grass. An eventful race saw him who was down in 27th at one point, finish ninth.

At the 2022 Indy 500, Lundgaard became the first Danish driver to race in the Indianapolis 500, he finished eighteenth. At the eighth round at the 2022 Sonsio Grand Prix at Road America, Lundgaard led a lap during the race, and worked his way to finish tenth. For the tenth round during the 2022 Honda Indy Toronto, Lundgaard once again qualified in the top-ten. In the race, Lundgaard gained positions when others made contact and took eighth place, his highest finish in IndyCar up till that point. Lundgaard added another tenth-place finish in the first Iowa race, but in the second race, his races was ended early by a brake issue.

The thirteenth round, at the 2022 Gallagher Grand Prix saw Lundgaard qualify sixth. He moved into fourth at the race start and passed Felix Rosenqvist on lap nine for third. He overtook Colton Herta for second after the American slowed. Lundgaard even pressured race leader Alexander Rossi for the lead, but had to settle for second. Despite that, it was his first ever IndyCar podium and said that "it feels amazing". Lundgaard followed it up with a best third in qualifying at the 2022 Big Machine Music City Grand Prix. With two laps to go, Lundgaard steered out of trouble as he faced a safety car whilst in third place. However, he suddenly dropped to eighth at the flag. A poor weekend in the 2022 Bommarito Automotive Group 500 followed, before qualifying fourth in the penultimate race in Portland. However his first pit stop had problems, and he fell near outside the top-ten. He tried to recover, but near the end Lundgaard made a mistake and collected a foam barrier dropping him to 21st as he was forced to pit. The final race at Laguna Seca saw Lundgaard qualify sixteenth, but brilliantly improved to finish fifth. Lundgaard ended his rookie season of IndyCar in 14th with 323 points. This meant that he won the Rookie Of The Year, beating his closest rookie rival David Malukas by 18 points. On his rookie title, Lundgaard expressed that his "route to IndyCar rookie title was very tough".

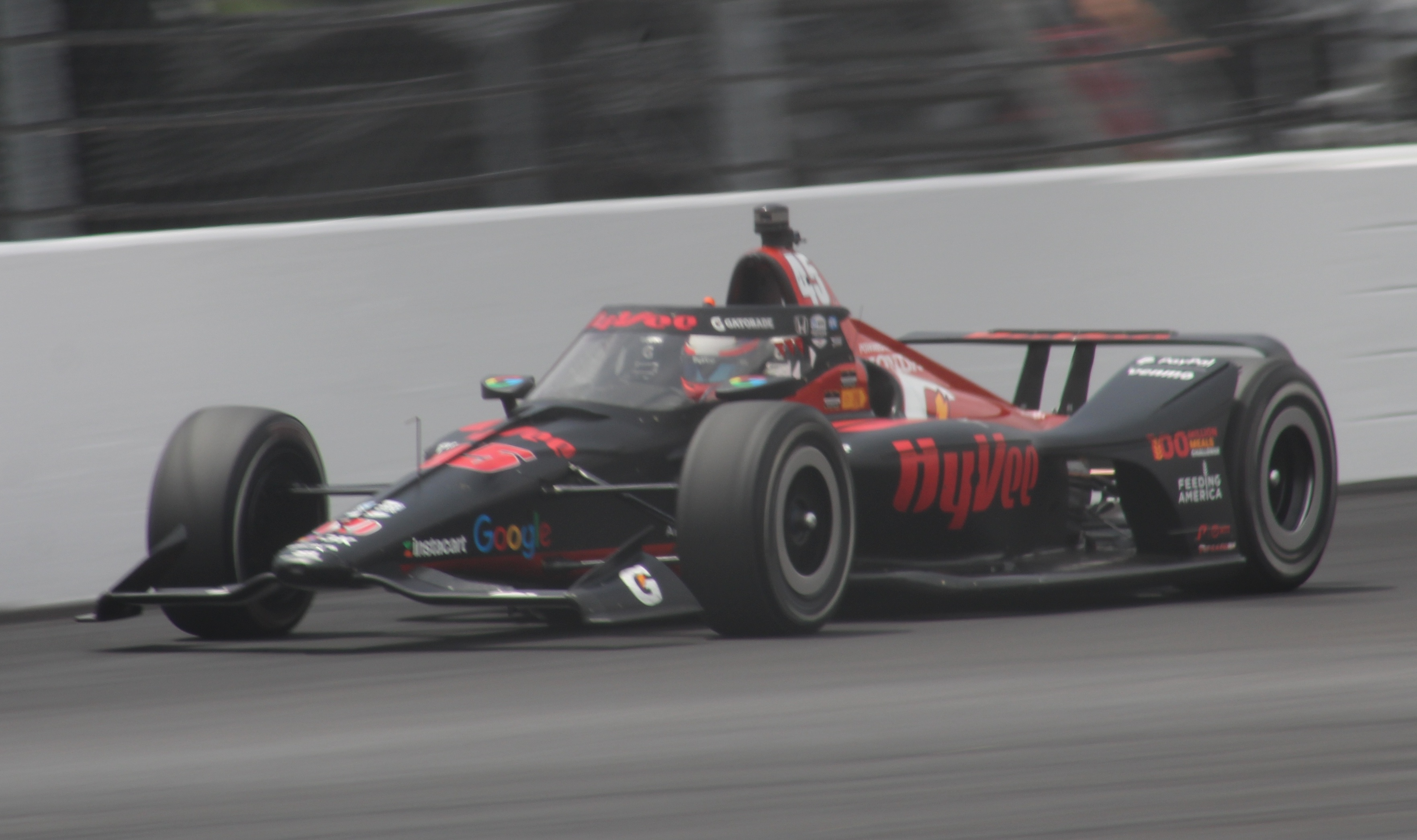
Lundgaard during the 2023 Indianapolis 500

==== 2023 ====
In August 2022, Lundgaard signed a contract to remain with Rahal Letterman Lanigan Racing for 2023 and beyond. 2023 would be Lundgaard's breakout year in IndyCar. He captured his first IndyCar win in Toronto.

==== 2024 ====
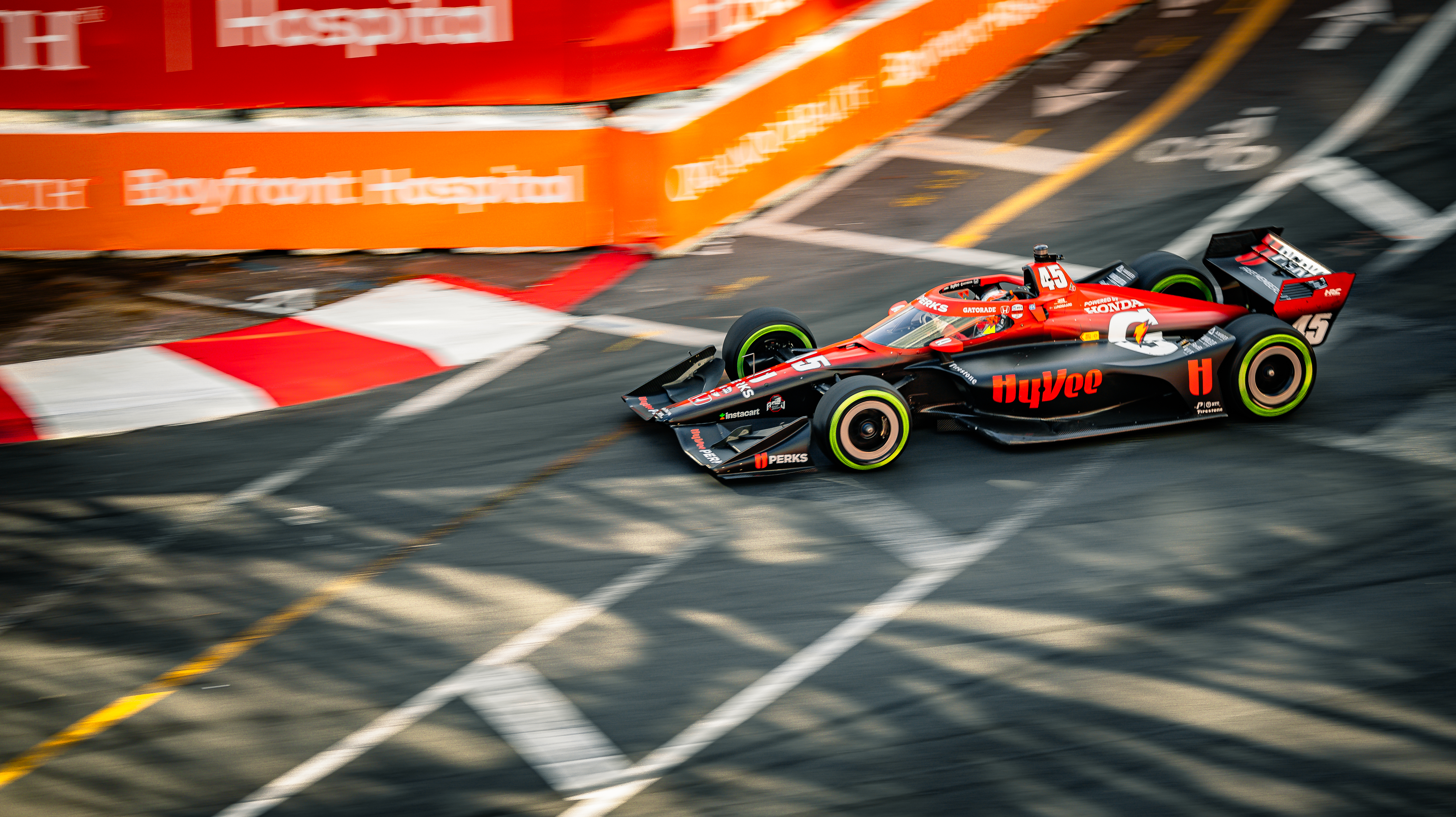
Lundgaard at the 2024 Firestone Grand Prix of St. Petersburg

Following the 2024 season, he would switch to Arrow McLaren.

=== Arrow McLaren (2025–2026) ===
==== 2025 ====
Lundgaard switched to Arrow McLaren for the 2025 season, replacing Alexander Rossi and partnered with Pato O'Ward and Nolan Siegel. With McLaren in 2025, he started the Indianapolis 500 with a career-best eighth starting position, finishing also a career-best seventh. He earned a pole at Portland, although he dropped six-positions due to an engine change, and earned six podium finishes.

==== 2026 ====
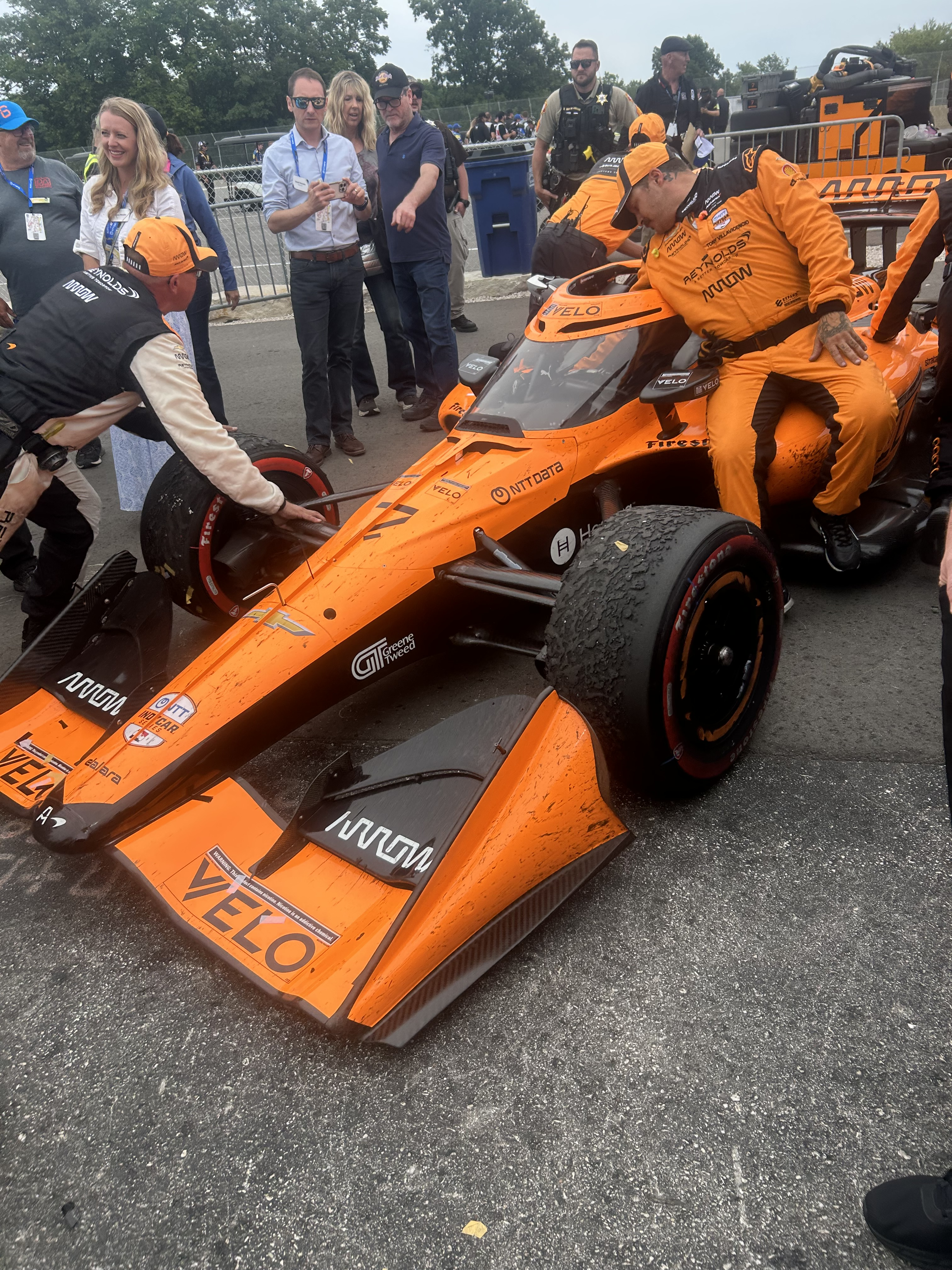
Lundgaard's race-winning car after winning at Road America

In 2026, he collected his second and third career wins respectively at the 2026 Sonsio Grand Prix and the 2026 XPEL Grand Prix at Road America. His win at the four-mile Road America course was particularly noteworthy, as he was involved in a shunt in turn one on the first lap, causing him to limp his damaged race car almost a complete back to the pits, while under green flag conditions. After pitting for repairs, Lundgaard was seconds from being lapped when he exited pit lane and was able to catch back up to the rear of the field under a timely caution flag on lap 14.

At the start of July, it was announced that Lundgaard would be leaving the team at the end of the season. He finished the season third in the championship standings, his highest career finish.

=== Chip Ganassi Racing (2027) ===
==== 2027 ====
On September 29, 2026, Chip Ganassi Racing announced it signed Lundgaard to a multi-year deal to drive its No. 9 car beginning in 2027.

== Personal life ==
Lundgaard's father is 2000 European Rally champion Henrik Lundgaard. His brother, Daniel, raced alongside Christian in the 2017 F4 Danish Championship and now designs his race helmets.

== Karting record ==
=== Karting career summary ===
Season	Series	Team	Position
2011	WSK Master Series — 60 Mini	Lundgaard Racing	NC
2012	Racehall of Champions — 60 kg		8th
2012	Kart Cup South Denmark — Cadet Junior	VKK	1st
2013	Racehall of Champions — 65 kg		2nd
2013	Danish Championship — Cadet Junior		2nd
2014	South Garda Winter Cup — KFJ		24th
2014	WSK Champions Cup — KFJ	Lundgaard Racing	22nd
2014	CIK-FIA European Championship — KFJ	Lundgaard, Henrik	24th
2014	CIK-FIA World Championship — KFJ	Lundgaard, Henrik	13th
2014	WSK Final Cup — KFJ	Ward Racing	6th
2015	WSK Champions Cup — KFJ	Ward Racing	2nd
2015	South Garda Winter Cup — KFJ	Ward Racing	1st
2015	WSK Gold Cup — KFJ	Ward Racing	1st
2015	WSK Super Master Series — KFJ	Ward Racing	4th
2015	CIK-FIA European Championship — KFJ	Ward Racing	1st
2015	Trofeo Industrie — KFJ		2nd
2015	CIK-FIA World Championship — KFJ	Energy Corse	16th
2015	SKUSA SuperNationals — TaG Junior	Energy Corse America	49th
2016	WSK Champions Cup — OK	Energy Corse	3rd
2016	WSK Super Master Series — OK	Energy Corse	14th
2016	Danish Championship — OK		2nd
2016	CIK-FIA European Championship— OK	Ricciardo Kart Racing	11th
2016	WSK Final Cup — OK	Ricciardo Kart Racing	4th
2016	CIK-FIA World Championship — OK	Ricciardo Kart Racing	29th

== Racing record ==
=== Racing career summary ===
Season	Series	Team	Races	Wins	Poles	F/Laps	Podiums	Points	Position
2017	SMP F4 Championship	MP Motorsport	21	10	9	10	14	292	**1st**
2017	F4 Spanish Championship	MP Motorsport	20	7	7	7	17	330	**1st**
2017	F4 Danish Championship	Lundgaard Racing	3	0	0	2	1	42	11th
2018	Formula Renault Eurocup	MP Motorsport	20	4	4	3	10	258	**2nd**
2018	Formula Renault NEC	MP Motorsport	8	2	1	3	2	48	11th‡
2018	GP3 Series	MP Motorsport	2	0	0	0	0	0	23rd
2019	FIA Formula 3 Championship	ART Grand Prix	16	1	2	2	2	97	6th
2019	Macau Grand Prix	ART Grand Prix	1	0	0	0	0	N/A	4th
2019	FIA Formula 2 Championship	Trident	2	0	0	0	0	0	23rd
2019	F3 Asian Winter Series	Pinnacle Motorsport	3	0	0	0	0	0	NC†
2020	FIA Formula 2 Championship	ART Grand Prix	24	2	1	2	6	149	7th
2021	FIA Formula 2 Championship	ART Grand Prix	23	0	0	0	3	50	12th
2021	IndyCar Series	Rahal Letterman Lanigan Racing	1	0	0	0	0	19	37th
2021	Formula One	Alpine F1 Team	Simulator driver						
2022	IndyCar Series	Rahal Letterman Lanigan Racing	17	0	0	0	1	323	14th
2023	IndyCar Series	Rahal Letterman Lanigan Racing	17	1	2	1	1	390	8th
2024	IndyCar Series	Rahal Letterman Lanigan Racing	17	0	0	1	1	312	11th
2025	IndyCar Series	Arrow McLaren	17	0	1	0	6	431	5th
2026	IndyCar Series	Arrow McLaren	18	2	1	2	7	535	**3rd**

^{‡} Lundgaard was ineligible for points from the third round onwards.
^{†} As Lundgaard was a guest driver, he was ineligible for points.
^{*} Season still in progress.

=== Complete SMP F4 Championship results ===
(key) (Races in bold indicate pole position) (Races in italics indicate fastest lap)

Year	Team	1	2	3	4	5	6	7	8	9	10	11	12	13	14	15	16	17	18	19	20	21	Pos	Points
2017	MP Motorsport	SOC; 1; 5	SOC; 2; 1	SOC; 3; 1	SMO; 1; 2	SMO; 2; 6	SMO; 3; 3	AHV; 1; 7	AHV; 2; 7	**AHV**; **3**; 1	AUD; 1; 1	AUD; 2; 1	**AUD**; **3** Ret	**MSC1**; **1**; 1	MSC1; 2; 1	**MSC1**; **3**; 3	**MSC2**; **1**; 1	MSC2; 2; 1	**MSC2**; **3**; 11	ASS; 1 Ret	ASS; 2; 2	ASS; 3; 1	1st	292

=== Complete F4 Spanish Championship results ===
(key) (Races in bold indicate pole position) (Races in italics indicate fastest lap)

Year	Team	1	2	3	4	5	6	7	8	9	10	11	12	13	14	15	16	17	18	19	20	Pos	Points
2017	MP Motorsport	ALC; 1; 1	ALC; 2; 1	ALC; 3; 1	**NAV1**; **1**; 2	**NAV1**; **2**; 1	**NAV1**; **3**; 2	CAT; 1; 2	CAT; 2; 5	JER; 1; 3	JER; 2; 4	JER; 3; 3	**NAV2**; **1**; 1	NAV2; 2; 2	NAV2; 3; 3	NOG; 1; 2	NOG; 2; 3	**NOG**; **3**; 4	**EST**; **1**; 2	**EST**; **2**; 1	EST; 3; 1	1st	330

=== Complete F4 Danish Championship results ===
(key) (Races in bold indicate pole position) (Races in italics indicate fastest lap)

Year	Team	1	2	3	4	5	6	7	8	9	10	11	12	13	14	15	16	17	18	19	20	21	Pos	Points
2017	Lundgaard Racing	JYL1; 1	JYL1; 2	JYL1; 3	DJU1; 1; 4	DJU1; 2; 4	DJU1; 3; 2	PAD1; 1	PAD1; 2	PAD1; 3	JYL2; 1	JYL2; 2	JYL2; 3	PAD2; 1	PAD2; 2	PAD2; 3	DJU2; 1	DJU2; 2	DJU2; 3	JYL3; 1	JYL3; 2	JYL3; 3	11th	42

=== Complete Formula Renault Northern European Cup results ===
(key) (Races in bold indicate pole position) (Races in italics indicate fastest lap)

Year	Team	1	2	3	4	5	6	7	8	9	10	11	12	DC	Points
2018	MP Motorsport	PAU; 1; 2	PAU; 2; 2	MNZ; 1	MNZ; 2	SPA; 1; 1	SPA; 2; 8	HUN; 1; 2	HUN; 2; 1	NÜR; 1; 3	NÜR; 2; 5	HOC; 1 Ret	HOC; 2 Ret	11th‡	48

^{‡} Lundgaard was ineligible for points from the third round onwards.

=== Complete Formula Renault Eurocup results ===
(key) (Races in bold indicate pole position) (Races in italics indicate fastest lap)

Year	Team	1	2	3	4	5	6	7	8	9	10	11	12	13	14	15	16	17	18	19	20	Pos	Points
2018	MP Motorsport	LEC; 1; 5	LEC; 2; 3	MNZ; 1; 2	MNZ; 2; 1	SIL; 1 Ret	SIL; 2; 5	MON; 1; 5	MON; 2; 5	RBR; 1; 5	RBR; 2; 3	SPA; 1; 1	SPA; 2; 8	**HUN**; **1**; 2	**HUN**; **2**; 1	NÜR; 1; 3	NÜR; 2; 5	HOC; 1 Ret	**HOC**; **2** Ret	**CAT**; **1**; 1	CAT; 2; 2	2nd	258

=== Complete GP3 Series/FIA Formula 3 Championship results ===
(key) (Races in bold indicate pole position) (Races in italics indicate fastest lap)

Year	Entrant	1	2	3	4	5	6	7	8	9	10	11	12	13	14	15	16	17	18	Pos	Points
2018	MP Motorsport	CAT; FEA	CAT; SPR	LEC; FEA; 12	LEC; SPR; 13	RBR; FEA	RBR; SPR	SIL; FEA	SIL; SPR	HUN; FEA	HUN; SPR	SPA; FEA	SPA; SPR	MNZ; FEA	MNZ; SPR	SOC; FEA	SOC; SPR	YMC; FEA	YMC; SPR	23rd	0
2019	ART Grand Prix	CAT; FEA; 2	CAT; SPR; 6	LEC; FEA; Ret	LEC; SPR; 15	RBR; FEA; 26	RBR; SPR; 17	SIL; FEA; 7	SIL; SPR; 5	**HUN**; **FEA**; 1	HUN; SPR; 5	SPA; FEA; 4	SPA; SPR; 4	**MNZ**; **FEA**; 13	MNZ; SPR; 9	SOC; FEA; 14	SOC; SPR; 9			6th	97

=== Complete Macau Grand Prix results ===
Year	Team	Car	Qualifying	Quali Race	Main race
2019	(France) ART Grand Prix	Dallara F3 2019	4th	**3rd**	4th

=== Complete FIA Formula 2 Championship results ===
(key) (Races in bold indicate pole position) (Races in italics indicate points for the fastest lap of top ten finishers)

Year	Entrant	1	2	3	4	5	6	7	8	9	10	11	12	13	14	15	16	17	18	19	20	21	22	23	24	DC	Points
2019	Trident	BHR; FEA	BHR; SPR	BAK; FEA	BAK; SPR	CAT; FEA	CAT; SPR	MON; FEA	MON; SPR	LEC; FEA	LEC; SPR	RBR; FEA	RBR; SPR	SIL; FEA	SIL; SPR	HUN; FEA	HUN; SPR	SPA; FEA	SPA; SPR	MNZ; FEA	MNZ; SPR	SOC; FEA	SOC; SPR	YMC; FEA; 14	YMC; SPR; 12	23rd	0
2020	ART Grand Prix	RBR; FEA; 4	RBR; SPR; 5	RBR; FEA; 6	RBR; SPR; 1	HUN; FEA; Ret	HUN; SPR; 13	SIL; FEA; 4	SIL; SPR; 2	SIL; FEA; 2	SIL; SPR; 21	CAT; FEA; 11	CAT; SPR; 11	SPA; FEA; 17	SPA; SPR; 7	MNZ; FEA; 3	MNZ; SPR; 2	**MUG**; **FEA**; 6	MUG; SPR; 1	SOC; FEA; Ret	SOC; SPR; 13	BHR; FEA; 19	BHR; SPR; 6	BHR; FEA; 21	BHR; SPR; 12	7th	149
2021	ART Grand Prix	BHR; SP1; 6	BHR; SP2; 2	BHR; FEA; 12	MCO; SP1; Ret	MCO; SP2; Ret	MCO; FEA; 12	BAK; SP1; 11	BAK; SP2; Ret	BAK; FEA; 9	SIL; SP1; 3	SIL; SP2; 13	SIL; FEA; 21	MNZ; SP1; 3	MNZ; SP2; 14	MNZ; FEA; 10	SOC; SP1; 7	SOC; SP2; C	SOC; FEA; 9	JED; SP1; 6	JED; SP2; 15	JED; FEA; 7‡	YMC; SP1; 15	YMC; SP2; 18	YMC; FEA; 15	12th	50

^{‡} Half points awarded as less than 75% of race distance was completed.

=== American open-wheel racing results ===
==== IndyCar Series ====
(key)

Year	Team	No.	Chassis	Engine	1	2	3	4	5	6	7	8	9	10	11	12	13	14	15	16	17	18	Rank	Points	Ref
2021	Rahal Letterman Lanigan Racing	45	Dallara DW12	Honda	ALA	STP	TXS	TXS	IMS	INDY	DET	DET	ROA	MOH	NSH	IMS; 12	GTW	POR	LAG	LBH			37th	19	
2022	Rahal Letterman Lanigan Racing	30	Dallara DW12	Honda	STP; 11	TXS; 19	LBH; 18	ALA; 15	IMS; 9	INDY; 18	DET; 14	ROA; 10	MOH; 11	TOR; 8	IOW; 10	IOW; 26	IMS; 2	NSH; 8	GTW; 19	POR; 21	LAG; 5		14th	323	
2023	Rahal Letterman Lanigan Racing	45	Dallara DW12	Honda	STP; 9	TXS; 19	LBH; 14	ALA; 6	**IMS**; 4	INDY; 19	DET; 16	ROA; 7	MOH; 4	**TOR**; 1*	IOW; 20	IOW; 13	NSH; 9	IMS; 4	GTW; 17	POR; 11	LAG; 6		8th	390	
2024	Rahal Letterman Lanigan Racing	45	Dallara DW12	Honda	STP; 18	THE; 9	LBH; 23	ALA; 6	IMS; 3	INDY; 13	DET; 11	ROA; 11	LAG; 15	MOH; 7	IOW; 22	IOW; 17	TOR; 7	GTW; 15	POR; 13	MIL; 9	MIL; 12	NSH; 19	11th	312	
2025	Arrow McLaren	7	Dallara DW12	Chevrolet	STP; 8	THE; 3	LBH; 3	ALA; 2	IMS; 16	INDY; 7	DET; 8	GTW; 14	ROA; 24	MOH; 3	IOW; 21	IOW; 6	TOR; 13	LAG; 2	**POR**; 2	MIL; 6	NSH; 25		5th	431	
2026	Arrow McLaren	7	Dallara DW12	Chevrolet	STP; 3	PHX; 13	ARL; 7	ALA; 2	LBH; 20	IMS; 1	INDY; 17	DET; 5	GTW; 10	ROA; 1	**MOH**; 2	NSH; 16	POR; 9	MRK; 6	WSH; 2	MIL; 6	MIL; 3	LAG; 6	3rd	535	

==== Indianapolis 500 ====
Year	Chassis	Engine	Start	Finish	Team
2022	Dallara	Honda	31	18	Rahal Letterman Lanigan Racing
2023	Dallara	Honda	30	19	Rahal Letterman Lanigan Racing
2024	Dallara	Honda	28	13	Rahal Letterman Lanigan Racing
2025	Dallara	Chevrolet	8	7	Arrow McLaren
2026	Dallara	Chevrolet	18	17	Arrow McLaren

^{*} Season still in progress.

Sporting positions
Preceded by Richard Verschoor	SMP F4 Championship; Champion; 2017	Succeeded by Konsta Lappalainen
Preceded by Richard Verschoor	F4 Spanish Championship; Champion; 2017	Succeeded by Amaury Cordeel
Preceded by Scott McLaughlin	IndyCar; Rookie of the Year; 2022	Succeeded by Marcus Armstrong
