= 2017 F4 Spanish Championship =

2nd season of the Spanish F4 Championship

The 2017 F4 Spanish Championship was the second season of the Spanish F4 Championship. It was a multi-event motor racing championship for open wheel, formula racing cars regulated according to FIA Formula 4 regulations, taking place in Spain, France and Portugal. The championship featured drivers competing in 1.4 litre Tatuus-Abarth single seat race cars that conformed to the technical regulations for the championship. The series was organised by Koiranen GP and RFEDA.

MP Motorsport driver Christian Lundgaard won the drivers' championship after winning in the finale at Estoril. While his team successfully defended teams' title. Aleksandr Smolyar finished as runner-up to Lundgaard, winning more races than him, but Smolyar wasn't consistent as Lundgaard and lost by 36 points. The only other winner was another MP driver Bent Viscaal, who was victorious at Nogaro and Estoril and completed the top-three in the driver standings. Javier González, Guillem Pujeu, Tuomas Haapalainen and Lukas Dunner visited a podium step and shared places in top-eight in the driver standings. While Marta García, who finished ninth, was the only woman in the championship and the only competitor in the Female driver trophy, which she received at the end of the season.

== Entry list ==
Team	No.	Driver	Rounds
(Spain) Drivex School	4	(Spain) Javier Cobián	1
(Spain) Drivex School	58	(Mexico) Javier González	2–7
(Spain) Drivex School	88	(Russia) Ivan Berets	1–5
(Spain) Drivex School	99	(Canada) Jakes Caouette	All
(Netherlands) MP Motorsport	5	(Denmark) Christian Lundgaard	All
(Netherlands) MP Motorsport	8	(Austria) Lukas Dunner	All
(Netherlands) MP Motorsport	12	(Netherlands) Bent Viscaal	All
(Netherlands) MP Motorsport	17	(Malaysia) Nazim Azman	2–7
(Netherlands) MP Motorsport	19	(Spain) Marta García F	All
(Russia) SMP Racing	7	(Russia) Nikita Volegov	All
(Russia) SMP Racing	10	(Russia) Aleksandr Smolyar	All
(Russia) SMP Racing	22	(Finland) Sami-Matti Trogen	1–5
(Russia) SMP Racing	32	(Finland) Tuomas Haapalainen	1–2, 4–7
(Russia) SMP Racing	50	(Finland) Juuso Puhakka	1
(Russia) SMP Racing	77	(Finland) Konsta Lappalainen	4
(Spain) FA Racing Team	18	(Spain) Guillem Pujeu	All
(Spain) FA Racing Team	21	(Spain) Xavier Lloveras	1
(Finland) Kart in Club Driving Academy	50	(Finland) Juuso Puhakka	5
(Finland) Kart in Club Driving Academy	69	(Finland) Jesse Salmenautio	5, 7
(Finland) Kart in Club Driving Academy	77	(Finland) Konsta Lappalainen	5–7

== Race calendar and results ==
The provisional calendar was announced on 17 April 2017 and officially confirmed the 24 May 2017. The opening round in Alcañiz was in the support of the 2017 World Series Formula V8 3.5 while other round were stand-alone.

Round		Circuit	Date	Pole position	Fastest lap	Winning driver	Winning team
1	R1	(Spain) Ciudad del Motor de Aragón, Alcañiz	24 June	(Spain) Xavier Lloveras	(Denmark) Christian Lundgaard	(Denmark) Christian Lundgaard	(Netherlands) MP Motorsport
1	R2	(Spain) Ciudad del Motor de Aragón, Alcañiz	24 June	(Spain) Xavier Lloveras	(Denmark) Christian Lundgaard	(Denmark) Christian Lundgaard	(Netherlands) MP Motorsport
1	R3	(Spain) Ciudad del Motor de Aragón, Alcañiz	25 June	(Finland) Tuomas Haapalainen	(Denmark) Christian Lundgaard	(Denmark) Christian Lundgaard	(Netherlands) MP Motorsport
2	R1	(Spain) Circuito de Navarra, Los Arcos	2 September	(Denmark) Christian Lundgaard	(Netherlands) Bent Viscaal	(Russia) Aleksandr Smolyar	(Russia) SMP Racing
2	R2	(Spain) Circuito de Navarra, Los Arcos	3 September	(Denmark) Christian Lundgaard	(Netherlands) Bent Viscaal	(Denmark) Christian Lundgaard	(Netherlands) MP Motorsport
2	R3	(Spain) Circuito de Navarra, Los Arcos	3 September	(Denmark) Christian Lundgaard	(Netherlands) Bent Viscaal	(Netherlands) Bent Viscaal	(Netherlands) MP Motorsport
3	R1	(Spain) Circuit de Barcelona-Catalunya, Montmeló	17 September	(Russia) Aleksandr Smolyar	(Netherlands) Bent Viscaal	(Netherlands) Bent Viscaal	(Netherlands) MP Motorsport
3	R2	(Spain) Circuit de Barcelona-Catalunya, Montmeló	17 September	(Russia) Aleksandr Smolyar	(Netherlands) Bent Viscaal	(Russia) Aleksandr Smolyar	(Russia) SMP Racing
4	R1	(Spain) Circuito de Jerez, Jerez de la Frontera	23 September	(Russia) Aleksandr Smolyar	(Russia) Aleksandr Smolyar	(Russia) Aleksandr Smolyar	(Russia) SMP Racing
4	R2	(Spain) Circuito de Jerez, Jerez de la Frontera	23 September	(Russia) Aleksandr Smolyar	(Russia) Aleksandr Smolyar	(Russia) Aleksandr Smolyar	(Russia) SMP Racing
4	R3	(Spain) Circuito de Jerez, Jerez de la Frontera	24 September	(Russia) Aleksandr Smolyar	(Russia) Aleksandr Smolyar	(Russia) Aleksandr Smolyar	(Russia) SMP Racing
5	R1	(Spain) Circuito de Navarra, Los Arcos	14 October	(Denmark) Christian Lundgaard	(Spain) Guillem Pujeu	(Denmark) Christian Lundgaard	(Netherlands) MP Motorsport
5	R2	(Spain) Circuito de Navarra, Los Arcos	15 October	(Spain) Guillem Pujeu	(Spain) Guillem Pujeu	(Spain) Guillem Pujeu	(Spain) FA Racing Team
5	R3	(Spain) Circuito de Navarra, Los Arcos	15 October	(Russia) Aleksandr Smolyar	(Denmark) Christian Lundgaard	(Russia) Aleksandr Smolyar	(Russia) SMP Racing
6	R1	(France) Circuit Paul Armagnac, Nogaro	28 October	(Netherlands) Bent Viscaal	(Denmark) Christian Lundgaard	(Netherlands) Bent Viscaal	(Netherlands) MP Motorsport
6	R2	(France) Circuit Paul Armagnac, Nogaro	29 October	(Netherlands) Bent Viscaal	(Denmark) Christian Lundgaard	(Netherlands) Bent Viscaal	(Netherlands) MP Motorsport
6	R3	(France) Circuit Paul Armagnac, Nogaro	29 October	(Denmark) Christian Lundgaard	(Netherlands) Bent Viscaal	(Russia) Aleksandr Smolyar	(Russia) SMP Racing
7	R1	(Portugal) Autódromo do Estoril, Estoril	11 November	(Denmark) Christian Lundgaard	(Netherlands) Bent Viscaal	(Netherlands) Bent Viscaal	(Netherlands) MP Motorsport
7	R2	(Portugal) Autódromo do Estoril, Estoril	11 November	(Denmark) Christian Lundgaard	(Netherlands) Bent Viscaal	(Denmark) Christian Lundgaard	(Netherlands) MP Motorsport
7	R3	(Portugal) Autódromo do Estoril, Estoril	12 November	(Netherlands) Bent Viscaal	(Denmark) Christian Lundgaard	(Denmark) Christian Lundgaard	(Netherlands) MP Motorsport

== Championship standings ==
=== Drivers' championship ===
Points were awarded to the top 10 classified finishers in each race. No points were awarded for pole position or fastest lap.

Races	Position, points per race									
Races	**1st**	**2nd**	**3rd**	**4th**	**5th**	**6th**	**7th**	**8th**	**9th**	**10th**
Races 1 & 3	25	18	15	12	10	8	6	4	2	1
Race 2	15	12	10	8	6	4	2	1		

Female Trophy F

Pos	Driver	ALC (Spain)			NAV1 (Spain)			CAT (Spain)		JER (Spain)			NAV2 (Spain)			NOG (France)			EST (Portugal)			Pts
1	(Denmark) Christian Lundgaard	1	1	1	**2**	**1**	**2**	2	5	3	4	3	**1**	2	3	2	3	**4**	**2**	**1**	1	330
2	(Netherlands) Bent Viscaal	Ret	3	8	6	2	1	1	2	7	7	4	2	3	2	**1**	**1**	2	1	2	**DNS**	266
3	(Russia) Aleksandr Smolyar	2	Ret	11	1	3	10	**3**	**1**	**1**	**1**	**1**	DSQ	DSQ	**1**	3	2	1	3	4	9	263
4	(Russia) Nikita Volegov	4	2	3	10	6	Ret	5	3	5	6	7	4	7	5	4	7	11	6	8	3	152
5	(Mexico) Javier González				8	7	4	4	4	2	2	2	6	6	7	Ret	4	8	8	7	2	146
6	(Spain) Guillem Pujeu	6	7	5	DSQ	9	3	6	7	4	3	14†	10	**1**	10	7	8	5	7	3	4	135
7	(Finland) Tuomas Haapalainen	3	Ret	**2**	3	4	8			8	DNS	12†	11	5	4	5	6	6	5	6	5	130
8	(Austria) Lukas Dunner	7	Ret	4	4	5	Ret	11	6	11	8	6	3	4	8	6	5	3	4	5	Ret	129
9	(Spain) Marta García **F**	10	6	6	9	12	7	8	9	6	5	13†	7	10	6	8	10	7	11	9	8	70
10	(Russia) Ivan Berets	8	5	14†	12	13†	6	7	10	10	12	9	5	8	9							41
11	(Malaysia) Nazim Azman				5	10	5	9	11	14	11	10	8	12	13	Ret	11	10	10	12	7	35
12	(Finland) Sami-Matti Trogen	Ret	10	12†	7	8	11	12	8	9	Ret	5	14	9	16							23
13	(Finland) Konsta Lappalainen									12	9	8	13	11	12	Ret	9	9	9	10	6	16
14	(Finland) Juuso Puhakka	Ret	4	10									9	13	14							11
15	(Spain) Xavier Lloveras	**5**	**Ret**	13†																		10
16	(Canada) Jakes Caouette	9	9	9	11	11	9	10	12	13	10	11	12	15	11	9	12	12	13	Ret	11	9
17	(Spain) Javier Cobián	Ret	8	7																		7
18	(Finland) Jesse Salmenautio												15	14	15				12	11	10	1
Pos	Driver	ALC (Spain)			NAV1 (Spain)			CAT (Spain)		JER (Spain)			NAV2 (Spain)			NOG (France)			EST (Portugal)			Pts

Colour	Result
Gold	Winner
Silver	Second place
Bronze	Third place
Green	Points classification
Blue	Non-points classification
Blue	Non-classified finish (NC)
Purple	Retired, not classified (Ret)
Red	Did not qualify (DNQ)
Red	Did not pre-qualify (DNPQ)
Black	Disqualified (DSQ)
White	Did not start (DNS)
White	Withdrew (WD)
White	Race cancelled (C)
Blank	Did not practice (DNP)
Blank	Did not arrive (DNA)
Blank	Excluded (EX)

**Bold** – Pole
Italics – Fastest Lap

=== Teams' championship ===
Points were awarded to the best 2 classified of each team.

Pos	Driver	ALC (Spain)			NAV1 (Spain)			CAT (Spain)		JER (Spain)			NAV2 (Spain)			NOG (France)			EST (Portugal)			Pts
1	(Netherlands) MP Motorsport	1	1	1	2	1	1	1	2	3	4	3	1	2	2	1	1	2	1	1	1	619
1	(Netherlands) MP Motorsport	7	3	4	5	2	2	2	5	6	5	4	2	3	3	2	3	3	2	2	7	619
2	(Russia) SMP Racing	2	2	2	1	3	2	3	1	1	1	1	4	5	1	3	2	1	3	4	3	486
2	(Russia) SMP Racing	3	4	3	3	4	5	5	3	5	6	5	11	7	4	4	6	6	5	6	5	486
3	(Spain) Drivex School	8	5	7	8	7	4	4	4	2	2	2	5	6	7	9	4	8	8	7	2	198
3	(Spain) Drivex School	9	8	9	11	11	6	7	10	10	10	9	6	8	9	Ret	12	12	13	Ret	11	198
4	(Spain) FA Racing	5	7	5	DSQ	9	3	6	7	4	3	14†	10	1	10	7	8	5	7	3	4	140
4	(Spain) FA Racing	6	Ret	13†																		140
5	(Finland) Kart in Club Driving Academy												9	11	12	Ret	9	9	9	10	6	16
5	(Finland) Kart in Club Driving Academy												13	13	14				12	11	10	16
