= Verkhnedneprovsky =

Verkhnedneprovsky Верхнеднепровский
- Urban-type settlement
- Interactive map of Verkhnedneprovsky
- Location of Verkhnedneprovsky Verkhnedneprovsky (Smolensk Oblast)
- Coordinates: 54.9819°N 33.3479°E
- Country: Russia
- Federal subject: Smolensk Oblast
- Administrative district: Dorogobuzhsky District
- Founded: 1952
- Elevation: 210 m (690 ft)

Population (2010 Census)
  - Total: 12,969
  - Estimate (2024): 10,363 (−20.1%)
- Time zone: UTC+3 (MSK)
- Postal code: 215750
- OKTMO ID: 66614153051

Verkhnedneprovsky (Russian: Верхнеднепровский) is an urban locality (an urban-type settlement) in the Dorogobuzhsky District of Smolensk Oblast, Russia.

== History ==
East of the settlement, on 25 of August 1957 the Dorogobuzh Chemical Power Plant started operations.

== Demographics ==
=== Population ===
Historical population
Year	Pop.	±%
1959	2,531	—
1970	10,099	+299.0%
1979	16,163	+60.0%
1989	16,496	+2.1%
2002	14,287	−13.4%
2009	13,229	−7.4%
2019	11,380	−14.0%
