= Bent Viscaal =

Dutch racing driver (born 1999)

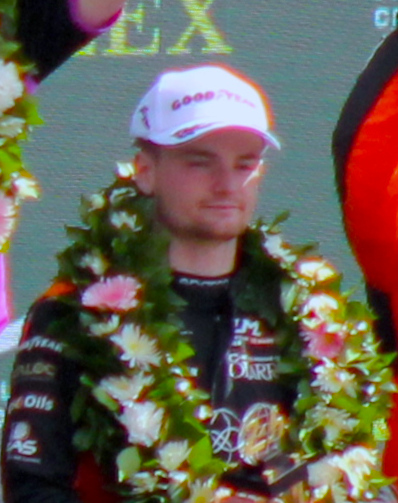
- Viscaal on the podium of the 2025 24 Hours of Le Mans
- Nationality: (Netherlands) Dutch
- Born: Bent Max Calvin Viscaal; 18 September 1999 (age 27) Almelo, Overijssel, Netherlands

European Le Mans Series career
- Debut season: 2022
- Current team: Proton Competition
- Categorisation: FIA Silver (2022); FIA Gold (2023–)
- Car number: 77
- Former teams: Algarve Pro Racing
- Starts: 22 (22 entries)
- Wins: 1
- Podiums: 6
- Poles: 10
- Fastest laps: 0
- Best finish: 3rd in 2024 (LMP2 Pro-Am)

Previous series
- 2024 2022–23 2021 2019–20 2018 2017 2017: IMSA SportsCar Championship; FIA WEC; FIA Formula 2 Championship; FIA Formula 3 Championship; Euroformula Open Championship; F4 Spanish Championship; SMP F4 Championship

Awards
- 2022: ELMS Rookie of the Year

Bent Max Calvin Viscaal (born 18 September 1999 in Almelo) is a Dutch racing driver who last competed in the European Le Mans Series. He is the series's 2022 Rookie of the Year.

Viscaal is the runner-up of the 2018 Euroformula Open Championship as well as the 2017 F4 Spanish Championship. Viscaal resides in a small Dutch town called Albergen.

== Early career ==
=== Karting career ===
Viscaal made his motor racing debut in karting in 2010 in the Dutch Mini Juniors Championship. In 2011, he became champion in the Mini Juniors class of the Euro Wintercup, and in 2012, he finished second in the Dutch KF3 Championship. From that season on, he also participated in foreign races, especially in Germany. In 2014, he made his debut in international karting in the European KF Junior Championship. In 2015, he became champion in the German Junior Championship. In 2016, he drove his last season in karts, in which he finished sixth in the OK class of the European Championship.

=== Lower formulae ===
In 2017, Viscaal made the switch to formula racing and made his debut in Formula 4 in both the SMP and Spanish Formula 4 Championships for MP Motorsport. In the SMP championship, he won four races at the Ahvenisto Race Circuit, the Auto24ring and the TT Circuit Assen (twice), finishing second in the final standings with 218 points behind Christian Lundgaard. In the Spanish championship, he won five races at the Circuito de Navarra, the Circuit de Barcelona-Catalunya, the Circuit Paul Armagnac (twice) and the Autódromo do Estoril, yet again finishing second in this championship behind Lundgaard with a 266 points deficit.

=== Euroformula Open Championship ===
In 2018, Viscaal switched to the Euroformula Open Championship to make his Formula 3 debut for the Teo Martín Motorsport team. In a season dominated by Felipe Drugovich, he won a race at Silverstone and finished on the podium in eleven other races, finishing second behind Drugovich with 246 points. He did win the rookie championship with fourteen wins, one second place and one retirement in sixteen races. The Euroformula Open also hosted the Spanish Formula 3 championship, in which Viscaal was also second behind Drugovich with five second places.

=== FIA Formula 3 Championship ===
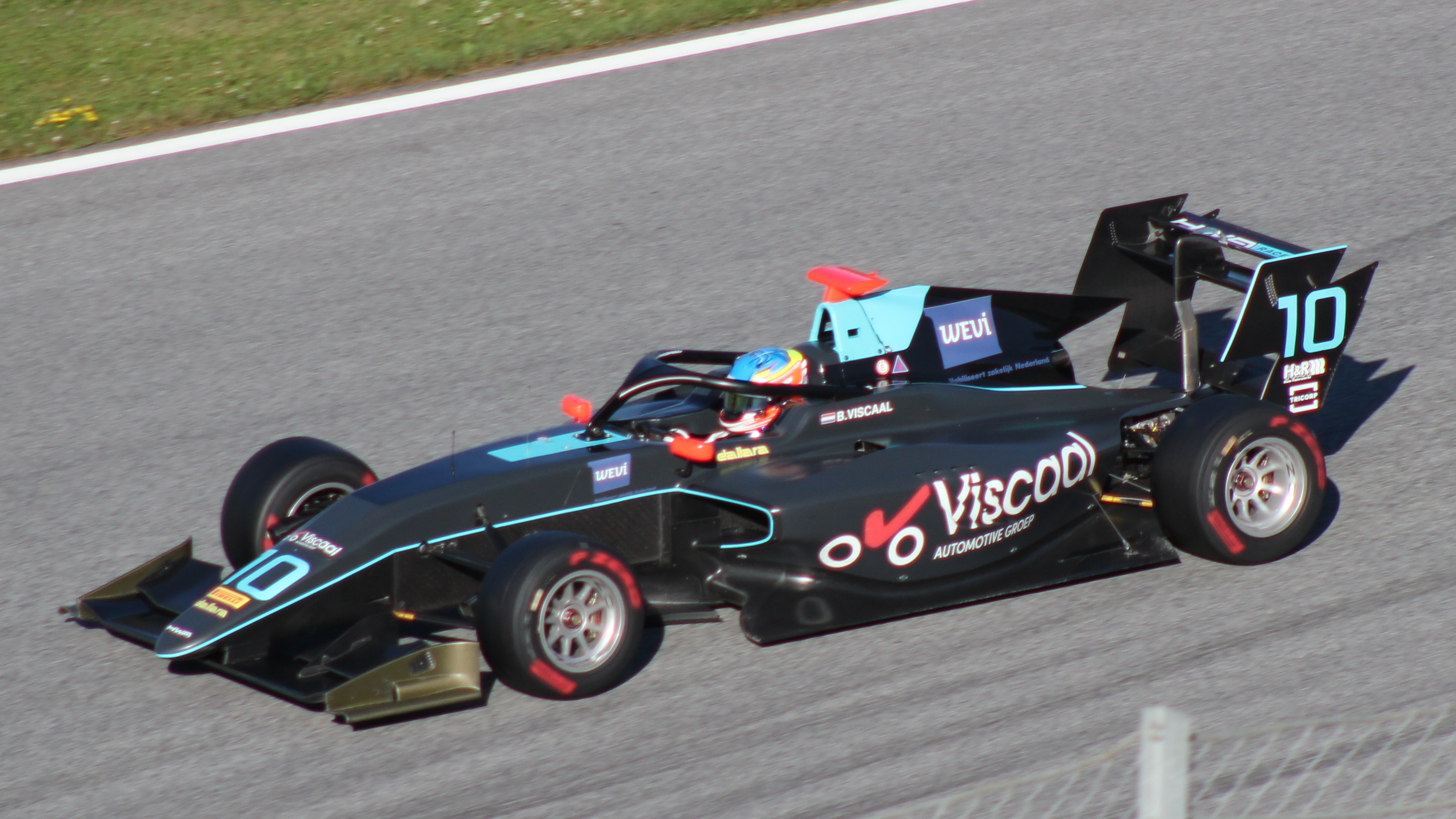
Viscaal with HWA Racelab during the 2019 Spielberg Formula 3 round

In 2019, Viscaal switched to the new FIA Formula 3 Championship, where he raced for the HWA Racelab team. He had a reasonable debut season, but only managed to score a fifth place at the Circuit Paul Ricard. With ten points, he finished fifteenth in the championship. At the end of the year, he drove in a race weekend of the MRF Challenge at the Bahrain International Circuit, winning two of the four races and finishing on the podium in another.

In 2020, Viscaal remained in FIA F3, but this time with MP Motorsport. At the Hungaroring he earned his first podium finish after a time penalty from Logan Sargeant. In the second race of this weekend, he originally took victory, but after two time penalties of five seconds each and a late safety car phase, he was classified seventeenth in the final results. At Silverstone, Viscaal scored his first victory after a last-lap battle with Lirim Zendeli. With 40 points, he finished thirteenth in the final standings.

=== FIA Formula 2 Championship ===
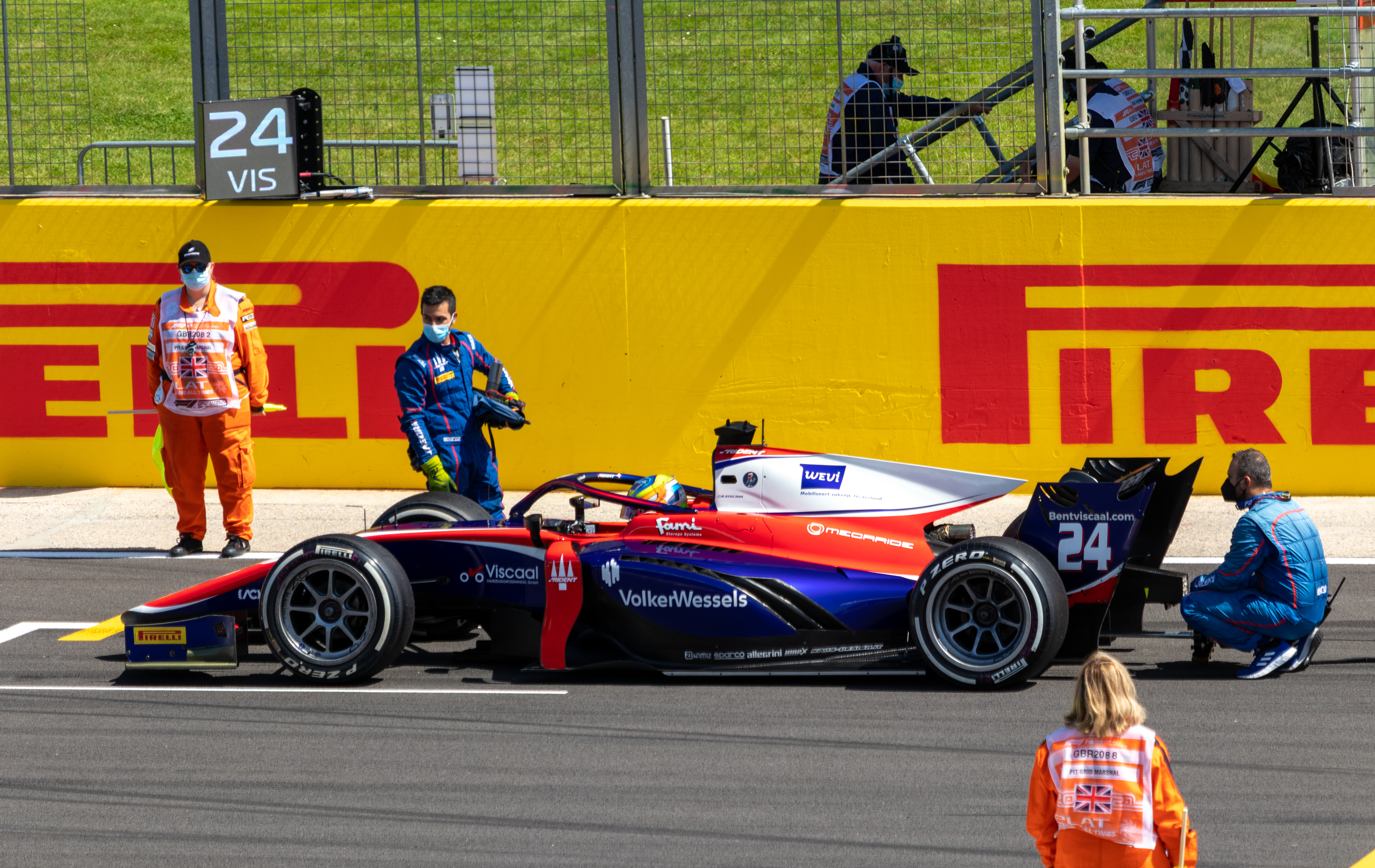
Viscaal at the 2021 Silverstone Formula 2 round

In 2021, Viscaal switched to the Formula 2 Championship with Trident, partnering Marino Sato. He scored his first points in round three at the Baku Street Circuit where he finished fourth, giving Trident their best race finish in the modern F2 era. Following a point-less round at Silverstone Viscaal finished seventh after having started from 18th in a chaotic first sprint race at Monza, thus propelling him to fourth on the starting grid for the second race. He managed to move up to second by the checkered flag and scored his first ever Formula 2 podium, which was also Trident's first in the FIA Formula 2 era. The following round at the Sochi Autodrom Viscaal was forced to retire in both races after collisions in the opening laps. After a two-month break Viscaal returned to race in the final two rounds of the series. Having stated that the Jeddah Corniche Circuit, which hosted the penultimate round of the season, was "[...] one of the best tracks [he'd] ever driven", Viscaal finished the sprint race in ninth place and ended race 2 in second place. Viscaal left Trident and the series following the season.

== Endurance racing career ==
=== Switch to LMP2 (2022–2023) ===
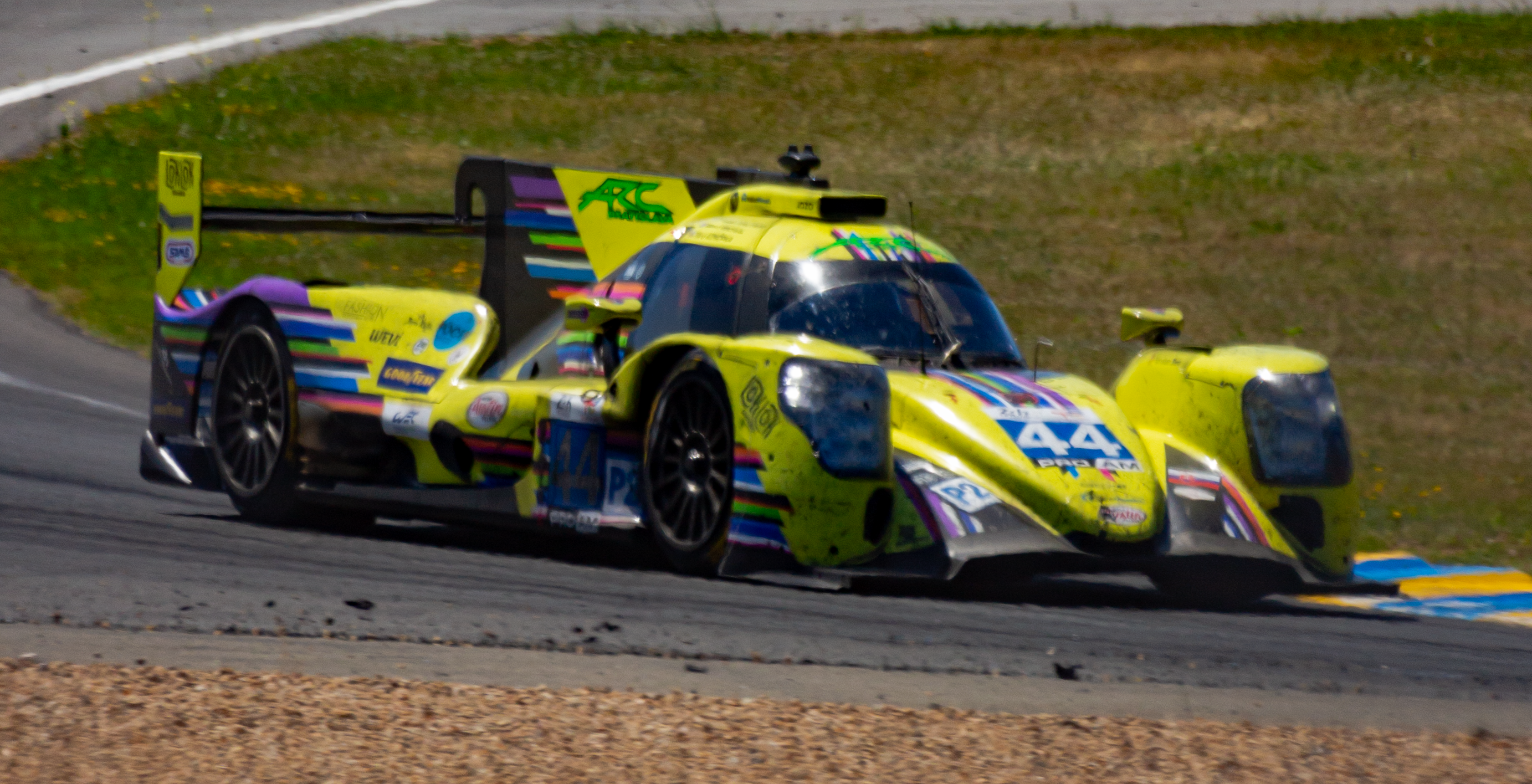
Viscaal racing for ARC Bratislava in 2022

For 2022, Viscaal switched to endurance racing, joining Algarve Pro Racing in the LMP2 class of the European Le Mans Series. Driving alongside Sophia Flörsch in an all-silver-ranked lineup, Viscaal finished second in his debut race at Le Castellet, having fended off Job van Uitert in the closing stages. The duo then narrowly missed out on another podium at Imola due to a badly-timed full-course yellow period and a puncture. Having made his FIA World Endurance Championship debut at Spa for ARC Bratislava, Viscaal entered the 24 Hours of Le Mans with the team. Having briefly held the LMP2 Pro-Am subclass lead during the night, the team ended up sixth in the subclass. Despite struggling to attain high results in the latter half of the ELMS campaign, Viscaal was named Rookie of the Year at the end of the season. He also drove for Prema Racing at the FIA WEC post-season test. Following the season, Viscaal's driver rating was upgraded to FIA Gold Categorisation.

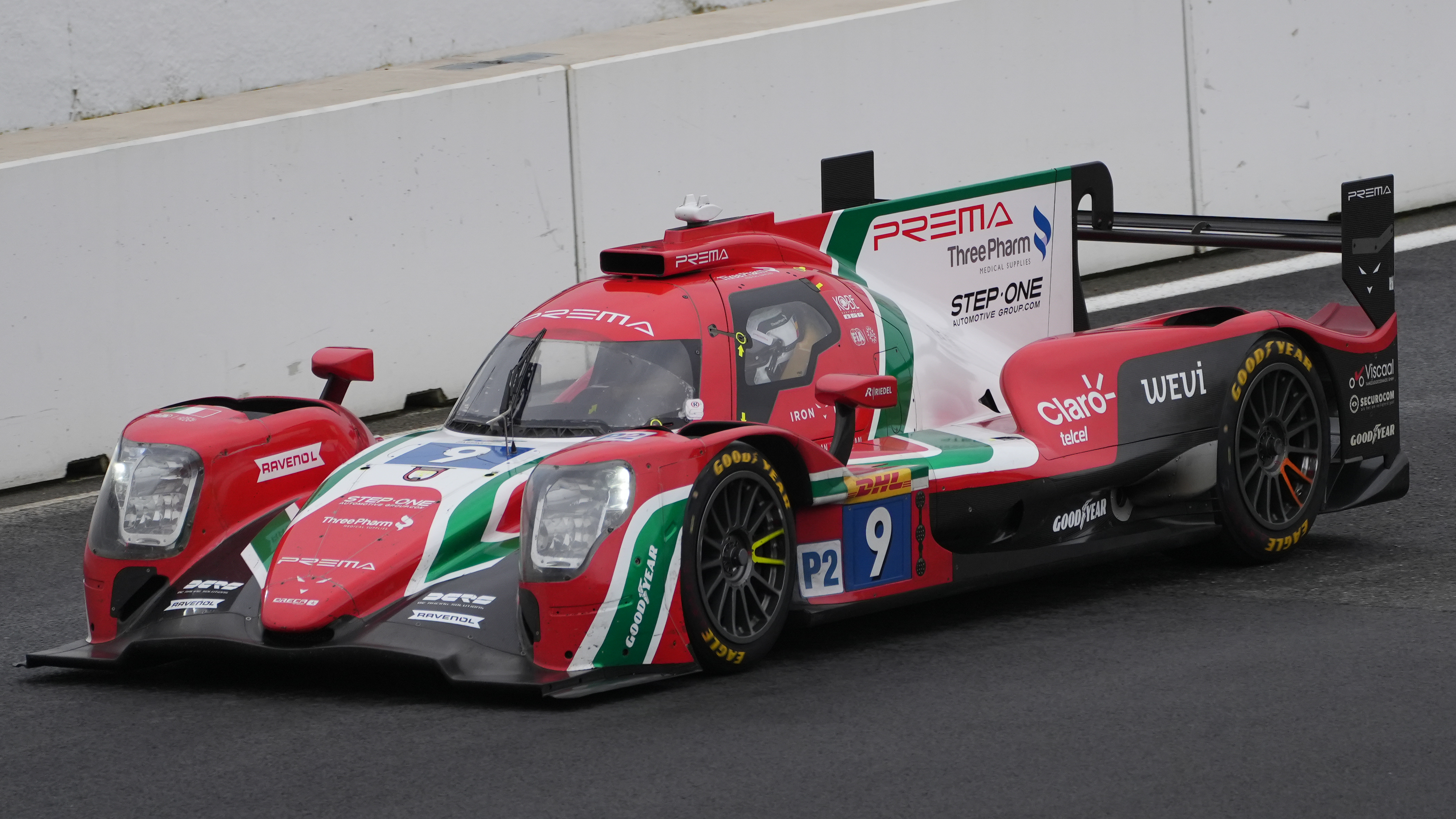
Viscaal at the 2023 6 Hours of Spa-Francorchamps

In 2023, Viscaal participated in the FIA World Endurance Championship with Prema, driving the No. 9 alongside silver-ranked Filip Ugran and the rotating pair of Juan Manuel Correa and Andrea Caldarelli. The lineup started by finishing eighth at Sebring and sixth at Portimão, before claiming fourth at Spa. Viscaal notably caused a collision which ended Gabriel Aubry's race at Monza, following which he apologised to Aubry's team, Vector Sport. The team concluded the season, in which they scored points in every race, with a fourth place at Bahrain. The No. 9 crew finished ninth in the standings, narrowly behind the sister No. 63 entry. During the year, Viscaal also made stand-in appearances in the ELMS: he first replaced Jack Hawksworth at Algarve Pro for the Aragón and Spa rounds, then drove for Proton Competition at the final weekend in the Algarvein place of Gianmaria Bruni.

=== GTP debut, ELMS Pro-Am success (2024–25) ===
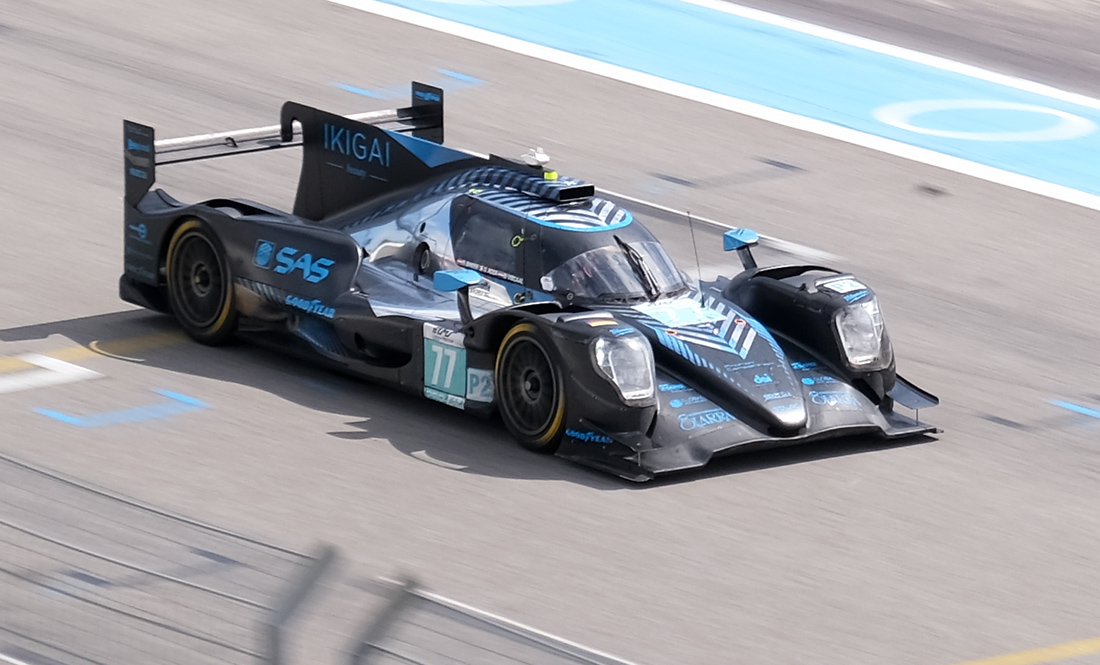
Viscaal driving at the 4 Hours of Paul Ricard in 2024.

Viscaal returned to the ELMS on a full-time basis in 2024, partnering René Binder and bronze-ranked Giorgio Roda at Proton Competition in the LMP2 Pro-Am class. Having taken fifth at Barcelona, the trio finished second in class at Le Castellet. After racing at Le Mans alongside Macéo Capietto and Jonas Ried, Viscaal and his ELMS teammates suffered a setback at Imola, finishing last in class after being run off into the gravel by another car. They bounced back by taking second at Spa and third at Mugello, keeping themselves in mathematical contention for the title going into the season finale. Despite not winning the title, they did win the race, as Viscaal passed the fuel-saving Alex Quinn on the final lap. This earned Viscaal and his teammates third in the Pro-Am class standings.

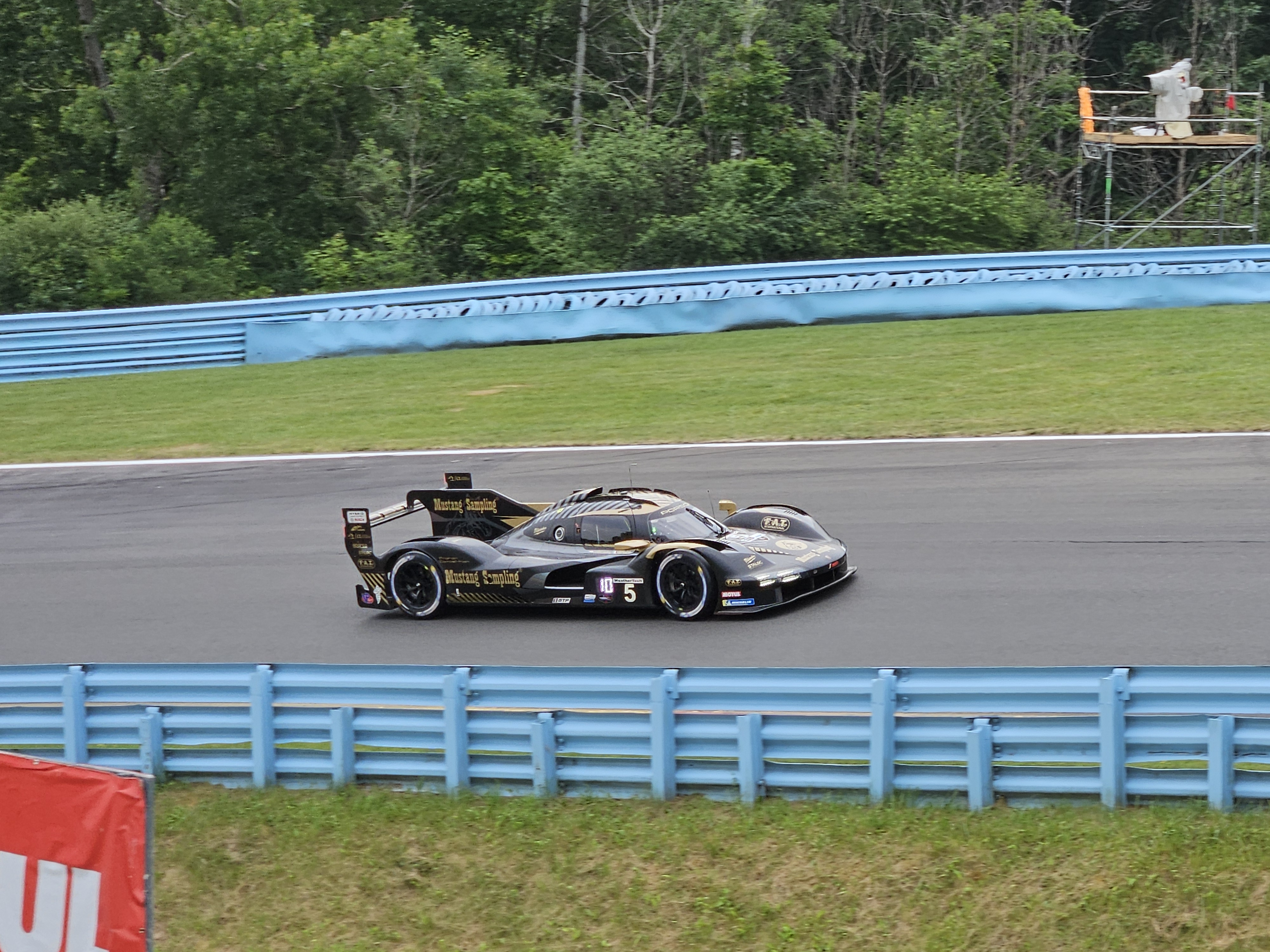
Viscaal at the 2024 Sahlen's Six Hours of The Glen

In May, it was announced that Viscaal would be making his GTP debut in the IMSA SportsCar Championship at Laguna Seca, driving a Proton-fielded Porsche 963 with Gianmaria Bruni. He scored a best finish of fifth on two occasions.

In 2025, Viscaal once again drove for Proton in the Pro-Am class of the ELMS. Fourth at Barcelona preceded another fourth in Le Castellet, where the team's chances of victory were scuppered by a drive-through penalty. After a fight between Viscaal and Louis Delétraz in the final hour of the Imola event, the former had to settle for second. This ended up being Proton's only podium of the campaign, as they retired at Silverstone due to a multi-car collision with Roda at the wheel, placed sixth at Spa, and fourth at Portimão; they ended up fifth in the standings. Viscaal also raced alongside Binder and Roda at the 24 Hours of Le Mans, where they finished sixth in LMP2 and third in the Pro-Am subclass.

== Personal life ==
As of 2026, Viscaal is the head of procurement at his family's car sales company, Viscaal Fahrzeuggrosshandel GmbH.

== Karting record ==
=== Karting career summary ===
Season	Series	Team	Position
2010	Dutch Championship — Mini Juniors		6th
2011	Euro Wintercup — Mini Junior		1st
2012	Euro Wintercup — KF3		20th
2012	Dutch Championship — KF3		2nd
2012	German Karting Championship — Junior		30th
2013	Trofeo delle Industrie — KF3		28th
2013	German Karting Championship — Junior		19th
2014	WSK Champions Cup — KFJ	CRG Holland	36th
2014	German Karting Championship — Junior	CRG Holland	19th
2014	CIK-FIA European Championship — KFJ	Zanardi	48th
2015	South Garda Winter Cup — KFJ		6th
2015	CIK-FIA European Championship — KFJ	Viscaal, Jeroen	11th
2015	German Karting Championship — Junior	KSM Racing Team	1st
2015	CIK-FIA World Championship — KFJ	KSM Racing Team	19th
2015	WSK Final Cup — KF	KSM Racing Team	10th
2016	WSK Champions Cup — OK	KSM Schumacher Racing Team	9th
2016	South Garda Winter Cup — OK	KSM Schumacher Racing Team	9th
2016	German Karting Championship — DSKM	KSM Schumacher Racing Team	22nd
2016	German Karting Championship — Senior	KSM Schumacher Racing Team	8th
2016	WSK Super Master Series — OK	KSM Schumacher Racing Team	21st
2016	CIK-FIA European Championship — OK	KSM Schumacher Racing Team	6th
2016	CIK-FIA International Super Cup — KZ2	CRG Holland	26th

== Racing record ==
=== Racing career summary ===
Season	Series	Team	Races	Wins	Poles	F/Laps	Podiums	Points	Position
2017	SMP F4 Championship	MP Motorsport	21	3	0	1	8	218	**2nd**
2017	F4 Spanish Championship	MP Motorsport	19	5	3	8	13	266	**2nd**
2018	Euroformula Open Championship	Teo Martín Motorsport	16	1	4	2	12	240	**2nd**
2018	Spanish Formula 3 Championship	Teo Martín Motorsport	6	0	1	1	5	104	**2nd**
2019	FIA Formula 3 Championship	HWA Racelab	16	0	0	0	0	10	15th
2019–20	MRF Challenge Formula 2000	MRF Racing	4	2	0	2	3	72	11th
2020	FIA Formula 3 Championship	MP Motorsport	18	1	0	1	2	40	13th
2021	FIA Formula 2 Championship	Trident	23	0	0	0	2	34	14th
2022	European Le Mans Series - LMP2	Algarve Pro Racing	6	0	0	0	1	37	9th
2022	FIA World Endurance Championship - LMP2	ARC Bratislava	2	0	0	0	0	0	26th
2022	24 Hours of Le Mans - LMP2	ARC Bratislava	1	0	0	0	0	N/A	21st
2023	FIA World Endurance Championship - LMP2	Prema Racing	7	0	0	0	0	57	10th
2023	24 Hours of Le Mans - LMP2	Prema Racing	1	0	0	0	0	N/A	16th
2023	European Le Mans Series - LMP2 Pro-Am	Algarve Pro Racing	2	0	0	0	0	27	14th
2023	European Le Mans Series - LMP2 Pro-Am	Proton Competition	2	0	0	0	0	27	14th
2024	European Le Mans Series - LMP2 Pro-Am	Proton Competition	6	1	0	0	4	95	**3rd**
2024	24 Hours of Le Mans - LMP2	Proton Competition	1	0	0	0	0	N/A	DNF
2024	IMSA SportsCar Championship - GTP	Proton Competition Mustang Sampling	6	0	0	0	0	1577	11th
2025	European Le Mans Series - LMP2 Pro-Am	Proton Competition	6	0	0	0	1	66	6th
2025	24 Hours of Le Mans - LMP2 Pro-Am	Proton Competition	1	0	0	0	1	N/A	**3rd**

=== Complete SMP F4 Championship results ===
(key) (Races in bold indicate pole position) (Races in italics indicate fastest lap)

Year	Team	1	2	3	4	5	6	7	8	9	10	11	12	13	14	15	16	17	18	19	20	21	Pos	Points
2017	MP Motorsport	SOC; 1; 2	SOC; 2; 8	SOC; 3; 2	SMO; 1; 8	SMO; 2; 5	SMO; 3; 8	AHV; 1; 1	AHV; 2 Ret	AHV; 3; 8	AUD; 1; 9	AUD; 2; 14	AUD; 3; 1	MSC1; 1; 4	MSC1; 2; 4	MSC1; 3; 7	MSC2; 1; 5	MSC2; 2; 6	MSC2; 3; 3	ASS; 1; 1	ASS; 2; 1	ASS; 3; 2	2nd	218

=== Complete F4 Spanish Championship results ===
(key) (Races in bold indicate pole position) (Races in italics indicate fastest lap)

Year	Team	1	2	3	4	5	6	7	8	9	10	11	12	13	14	15	16	17	18	19	20	Pos	Points
2017	MP Motorsport	ALC; 1 Ret	ALC; 2; 3	ALC; 3; 8	NAV1; 1; 6	NAV1; 2; 2	NAV1; 3; 1	CAT; 1; 1	CAT; 2; 2	JER; 1; 7	JER; 2; 7	JER; 3; 4	NAV2; 1; 2	NAV2; 2; 3	NAV2; 3; 2	**NOG**; **1**; 1	**NOG**; **2**; 1	NOG; 3; 2	EST; 1; 1	EST; 2; 2	**EST**; **3** DNS	2nd	266

=== Complete Euroformula Open Championship results ===
(key) (Races in bold indicate pole position) (Races in italics indicate fastest lap)

Year	Team	1	2	3	4	5	6	7	8	9	10	11	12	13	14	15	16	DC	Points
2018	Teo Martín Motorsport	EST; 1; 5	EST; 2; 3	LEC; 1; 2	LEC; 2; 7	SPA; 1; 5	SPA; 2; 3	HUN; 1; 2	**HUN**; **2**; 2	SIL; 1; 2	**SIL**; **2**; 1	**MNZ**; **1** Ret	MNZ; 2; 2	JER; 1; 2	JER; 2; 2	CAT; 1; 3	**CAT**; **2**; 2	2nd	246

=== Complete MRF Challenge Formula 2000 Championship results ===
(key) (Races in bold indicate pole position; races in italics indicate fastest lap)

Year	Team	1	2	3	4	5	6	7	8	9	10	11	12	13	14	15	DC	Points
2019–20	MRF Racing	DUB; 1	DUB; 2	DUB; 3	DUB; 4	DUB; 5	BHR; 1; 1	BHR; 2; 2	BHR; 3; 1	BHR; 4 Ret	CHE; 1	CHE; 2	CHE; 3	CHE; 4	CHE; 5	CHE; 6	11th	72

=== Complete FIA Formula 3 Championship results ===
(key) (Races in bold indicate pole position; races in italics indicate points for the fastest lap of top ten finishers)

Year	Entrant	1	2	3	4	5	6	7	8	9	10	11	12	13	14	15	16	17	18	DC	Points
2019	HWA Racelab	CAT; FEA; 13	CAT; SPR; 13	LEC; FEA; 5	LEC; SPR; 20	RBR; FEA; 13	RBR; SPR; Ret	SIL; FEA; 22	SIL; SPR; 20	HUN; FEA; 19	HUN; SPR; 10	SPA; FEA; 20	SPA; SPR; 14	MNZ; FEA; 17	MNZ; SPR; 27†	SOC; FEA; Ret	SOC; SPR; 17			15th	10
2020	MP Motorsport	RBR; FEA; 11	RBR; SPR; 11	RBR; FEA; 20	RBR; SPR; 16	HUN; FEA; 3	HUN; SPR; 17	SIL; FEA; Ret	SIL; SPR; 16	SIL; FEA; 8	SIL; SPR; 1	CAT; FEA; Ret	CAT; SPR; 20	SPA; FEA; 23	SPA; SPR; 16	MNZ; FEA; 8	MNZ; SPR; DSQ	MUG; FEA; Ret	MUG; SPR; 20	13th	40

=== Complete FIA Formula 2 Championship results ===
(key) (Races in bold indicate pole position) (Races in italics indicate points for the fastest lap of top ten finishers)

Year	Entrant	1	2	3	4	5	6	7	8	9	10	11	12	13	14	15	16	17	18	19	20	21	22	23	24	DC	Points
2021	Trident	BHR; SP1; 13	BHR; SP2; 12	BHR; FEA; 17	MCO; SP1; 14	MCO; SP2; 11	MCO; FEA; 11	BAK; SP1; 10	BAK; SP2; 4	BAK; FEA; 17	SIL; SP1; 16	SIL; SP2; Ret	SIL; FEA; 13	MNZ; SP1; 7	MNZ; SP2; 2	MNZ; FEA; 15†	SOC; SP1; Ret	SOC; SP2; C	SOC; FEA; Ret	JED; SP1; 9	JED; SP2; 2	JED; FEA; 12	YMC; SP1; 13	YMC; SP2; 10	YMC; FEA; 12	14th	34

^{†} Driver did not finish the race, but was classified as he completed over 90% of the race distance.

=== Complete European Le Mans Series results ===
(key) (Races in bold indicate pole position; results in italics indicate fastest lap)

Year	Entrant	Class	Chassis	Engine	1	2	3	4	5	6	Rank	Points
2022	Algarve Pro Racing	LMP2	Oreca 07	Gibson GK428 4.2 L V8	LEC; 2	IMO; 8	MNZ; 10	CAT; 12	SPA; 8	ALG; 5	9th	37
2023	Algarve Pro Racing	LMP2 Pro-Am	Oreca 07	Gibson GK428 4.2 L V8	CAT	LEC	ARA; 4	SPA; 6			14th	27
2023	Proton Competition	LMP2 Pro-Am	Oreca 07	Gibson GK428 4.2 L V8					ALG; Ret	**ALG**; 7	14th	27
2024	Proton Competition	LMP2 Pro-Am	Oreca 07	Gibson GK428 4.2 L V8	**CAT**; 5	**LEC**; 2	**IMO**; 8	SPA; 2	**MUG**; 3	**ALG**; 1	3rd	95
2025	Proton Competition	LMP2 Pro-Am	Oreca 07	Gibson GK428 4.2 L V8	**CAT**; 4	LEC; 4	**IMO**; 2	**SPA**; 6	SIL; Ret	**ALG**; 4	6th	66

=== Complete FIA World Endurance Championship results ===
(key) (Races in bold indicate pole position) (Races in italics indicate fastest lap)

Year	Entrant	Class	Chassis	Engine	1	2	3	4	5	6	7	Rank	Points
2022	ARC Bratislava	LMP2	Oreca 07	Gibson GK428 4.2 L V8	SEB	SPA; Ret	LMS; 12	MNZ	FUJ	BHR		26th	0
2023	Prema Racing	LMP2	Oreca 07	Gibson GK428 4.2 L V8	SEB; 7	ALG; 5	SPA; 4	LMS; 10	MNZ; 9	FUJ; 8	BHR; 4	10th	57

=== Complete 24 Hours of Le Mans results ===
Year	Team	Co-Drivers	Car	Class	Laps	Pos.	Class Pos.
2022	(Slovakia) ARC Bratislava	(Slovakia) Miro Konôpka (France) Tristan Vautier	Oreca 07-Gibson	LMP2	360	26th	21st
2023	(Italy) Prema Racing	(United States) Juan Manuel Correa (Romania) Filip Ugran	Oreca 07-Gibson	LMP2	310	34th	16th
2024	(Germany) Proton Competition	(France) Macéo Capietto (Germany) Jonas Ried	Oreca 07-Gibson	LMP2	86	DNF	DNF
2025	(Germany) Proton Competition	(Austria) René Binder (Italy) Giorgio Roda	Oreca 07-Gibson	LMP2	365	23rd	6th
2025	(Germany) Proton Competition	(Austria) René Binder (Italy) Giorgio Roda	Oreca 07-Gibson	LMP2 Pro-Am	365	23rd	**3rd**

=== Complete IMSA SportsCar Championship results ===
(key) (Races in bold indicate pole position) (Races in italics indicate fastest lap)

Year	Team	Class	Car	Engine	1	2	3	4	5	6	7	8	9	Rank	Points
2024	Proton Competition Mustang Sampling	GTP	Porsche 963	Porsche 9RD 4.6 L V8	DAY	SEB	LBH	LGA; 10	DET; 9	WGL; 7	ELK; 5	IMS; 5	PET; 6	11th	1577
