= 2020 GT Sports Club Europe =

The 2020 GT Sports Club Europe is the sixth season of the SRO Motorsports Group's GT Sports Club, an auto racing series for grand tourer cars. The GT Sports Club is a championship for Bronze level drivers only, with two additional sub-classes based on age, Titanium and Iron, in order to separate the potential of using higher-level drivers who are often in amateur classes based on their age. The Titanium categorisation for drivers between the age of 50 and 59. The Iron categorisation for drivers over the age of 60 (meaning all drivers who would be FIA Platinum or Gold but are 60 or older).

== Calendar ==
An initial calendar was released on 28 September at an SRO Motorsports Group press conference ahead of the 2019 Barcelona 3 Hours. It was later optimised so that GT2 and GT3 cars would run in the same races rather than having split championships. Subsequently, due to the spread of COVID-19 in Italy, SRO Motorsports Group cancelled the Monza round and replaced it with a round at Imola, while the round at Misano was also removed. The COVID-19 pandemic subsequently necessitated a revised calendar being released.

Round		Circuit	Location	Date	Supporting
1	R1	(Italy) Misano World Circuit	Misano Adriatico, Italy	7–9 August	GT World Challenge Europe Sprint Cup
1	R2	(Italy) Misano World Circuit	Misano Adriatico, Italy	7–9 August	GT World Challenge Europe Sprint Cup
1	R3	(Italy) Misano World Circuit	Misano Adriatico, Italy	7–9 August	GT World Challenge Europe Sprint Cup
2	R4	(France) Circuit de Nevers Magny-Cours	Magny-Cours, France	11–13 September	GT World Challenge Europe Sprint Cup
2	R5	(France) Circuit de Nevers Magny-Cours	Magny-Cours, France	11–13 September	GT World Challenge Europe Sprint Cup
3	R6	(Netherlands) Circuit Zandvoort	Zandvoort, Netherlands	25–27 September	GT World Challenge Europe Sprint Cup
3	R7	(Netherlands) Circuit Zandvoort	Zandvoort, Netherlands	25–27 September	GT World Challenge Europe Sprint Cup
4	R8	(Spain) Circuit de Barcelona-Catalunya	Montmeló, Spain	9–11 October	GT World Challenge Europe Sprint Cup
4	R9	(Spain) Circuit de Barcelona-Catalunya	Montmeló, Spain	9–11 October	GT World Challenge Europe Sprint Cup
4	R10	(Spain) Circuit de Barcelona-Catalunya	Montmeló, Spain	9–11 October	GT World Challenge Europe Sprint Cup
Cancelled due to the 2019-20 coronavirus pandemic
		Circuit		Location	Original Date
		(France) Circuit Paul Ricard		Le Castellet, France	30–31 May
		(Belgium) Circuit de Spa-Francorchamps		Stavelot, Belgium	24–25 July
		(Germany) Nürburgring		Nürburg, Germany	5–6 September
		(Italy) Autodromo Enzo e Dino Ferrari		Imola, Italy	30 October–1 November

== Entry list ==
Team	Car	No.	Drivers	Car	Class	Rounds	Ref
(France) AKKA ASP Team	Mercedes-AMG GT3 Evo	61	(Italy) Mauro Ricci	GT3	Ti		

Icon	Class
Car
GT2	GT2 Cars
GT3	GT3 Cars
Class
Ti	Titanium Cup
Iron	Iron Cup

== Race results ==
Round		Circuit	Pole position	Overall winner	Titanium Winner	Iron Winner
1	R1	(Italy) Misano	No Entries			
1	R2	(Italy) Misano	No Entries			
1	R3	(Italy) Misano	No Entries			
2	R1	(France) Magny-Cours	No Entries			
2	R2	(France) Magny-Cours	No Entries			
3	R1	(Netherlands) Zandvoort				
3	R2	(Netherlands) Zandvoort				
4	R1	(Spain) Barcelona				
4	R2	(Spain) Barcelona				
4	R3	(Spain) Barcelona				
