= Juuso Puhakka =

Finnish racing driver (born 1998)

- Nationality: (Finland) Finnish
- Born: 16 August 1998 (age 28) Kirkkonummi, Finland
- Categorisation: FIA Silver

Championship titles
- 2018: Lamborghini Super Trofeo Asia – Pro-Am

Juuso Puhakka (born 16 August 1998) is a Finnish road racing cyclist and former racing driver. He competed in three seasons of the GT World Challenge Europe between 2020 and 2022, and was successful in the Silver Cup for Toksport WRT and Attempto Racing. Since 2024, he is active in road cycling.

== Career ==
Puhakka began his single-seater career in 2015, competing in Formula Renault 1.6 Nordic for FinnDrive. In his rookie year in the series, Puhakka won at Falkenbergs Motorbana and Solvalla, as well as taking four other podiums to end the year third overall. Remaining in the newly-rebranded Formula STCC Nordic for 2016, Puhakka won at Skövde, Mantorp Park and Falkenbergs Motorbana en route to runner-up honours behind Linus Lundqvist. During 2016, Puhakka also raced part-time in the F4 Spanish Championship for MP Motorsport and Double R Racing, most notably taking a podium at Navarra with the former.

In 2017, Puhakka ventured to the Russian-based SMP F4 Championship with Lappalainen Team, taking a lone win at Smolensk Ring and three other podiums to end the season seventh in points. That year, Puhakka also made sporadic appearances in the F4 Spanish Championship for the Lappalainen-owned Kart in Club Driving Academy and SMP Racing, taking a best result of fourth at Aragón.

In 2018, Puhakka switched to sports car racing, joining Leipert Motorsport to compete in the Pro-Am class of Lamborghini Super Trofeo Asia alongside Mikko Eskelinen. In his rookie season in the series, Puhakka began the year by winning at Buriram and Suzuka, before taking a win in each of the final three rounds to secure the Pro-Am title at seasons' end. At the beginning of 2019, Puhakka moved to FFF Racing Team to partner Takashi Kasai in Lamborghini Super Trofeo Middle East, scoring five podiums to take third in the Pro standings. Continuing with Kasai for Lamborghini Super Trofeo Asia, as a member of the Lamborghini Young Drivers Programme, Puhakka scored three Pro class wins en route to runner-up honours.

Stepping up to GT3 for 2020, Puhakka returned to Europe and joined Toksport WRT in the GT World Challenge Europe Sprint Cup. Sharing a Mercedes-AMG GT3 Evo with Óscar Tunjo, Puhakka won once at Magny-Cours in Silver Cup to end the year fourth in points. That year, Puhakka also made his 24 Hours of Spa debut with fellow AMG customer team Madpanda Motorsport. Continuing with Toksport for his second Sprint Cup season in 2021, Puhakka and Tunjo won in class at Brands Hatch and took five other podiums to end the season fourth among the Silver Cup entries. Towards the end of the year, Puhakka made a one-off return to the GT World Challenge Europe Endurance Cup for Madpanda at Barcelona.

In 2022, Puhakka graduated to the Pro class with Attempto Racing, partnering Audi works drivers Dennis Marschall and Markus Winkelhock in the GTWCE Endurance Cup. However, Puhakka was demoted to Silver Cup for the 24 Hours of Spa, where he finished second in class before parting ways with Attempto. Puhakka returned to action in an ADAC GT Masters cameo with Madpanda at the Lausitzring, alongside select appearances in the Nürburgring Langstrecken-Serie's BMW M240i class for Schnitzelalm Racing. In 2023, Puhakka made three NLS starts for Schnitzelalm, including one in SP9, as his motorsport activity rapidly decreased.

In 2024, Puhakka began participating in road racing cycling events, primarily in Finland.

== Karting record ==
=== Karting career summary ===
Season	Series	Team	Position
2011	Finnish Cup — Raket		7th
2012	Finnish Championship — KF3		16th
2012	Bridgestone Cup Europe — KF3		9th
2012	Viking Trophy — KF3	Hemet Racing	15th
2013	Finnish Championship — KF3		5th
2013	Deutsche Kart-Meisterschaft — KF3		
2013	Karting European Championship — KF-J	Kohtala Sports	78th
2014	WSK Super Master Series — KF	Kohtala Sports	46th
2014	Karting European Championship — KF	Kohtala Sports	49th
2014	Karting World Championship — KF	Kohtala Sports	19th

== Racing record ==
=== Racing career summary ===
Season	Series	Team	Races	Wins	Poles	F/Laps	Podiums	Points	Position
2015	Formula Renault 1.6 Nordic	FinnDrive	15	2	1	1	6	195	**3rd**
2015	Formula Renault 1.6 NEZ Championship	FinnDrive	4	0	0	0	1	52	4th
2016	Formula STCC Nordic	FinnDrive	14	3	6	3	9	214	**2nd**
2016	F4 Spanish Championship	MP Motorsport	3	0	0	0	1	0	NC†
2016	F4 Spanish Championship	Double R Racing	6	0	0	0	0	0	NC†
2017	SMP F4 Championship	Lappalainen Team	21	1	0	3	4	136	7th
2017	F4 Spanish Championship	SMP Racing	3	0	0	0	0	11	14th
2017	F4 Spanish Championship	Kart in Club Driving Academy	3	0	0	0	0	11	14th
2018	Lamborghini Super Trofeo Asia – Pro-Am	Leipert Motorsport	12	5	3	1	11	131	**1st**
2018	Lamborghini Super Trofeo World Finals – Pro-Am	Leipert Motorsport	2	0	0	0	1		4th
2019	Lamborghini Super Trofeo Middle East – Pro	FFF Racing Team	6	0	0	0	5		**3rd**
2019	Lamborghini Super Trofeo Asia – Pro	FFF Racing Team	12	3	2	3	12	131	**2nd**
2019	Lamborghini Super Trofeo World Finals – Pro	FFF Racing Team	2	0	0	0	0	5	9th
2020	GT World Challenge Europe Sprint Cup	Toksport WRT	7	0	0	0	0	14	18th
2020	GT World Challenge Europe Sprint Cup – Silver	Toksport WRT	7	1	0	0	5	69	4th
2020	GT World Challenge Europe Endurance Cup	Madpanda Motorsport	1	0	0	0	0	0	NC
2020	GT World Challenge Europe Endurance Cup – Silver	Madpanda Motorsport	1	0	0	0	0	16	20th
2021	GT World Challenge Europe Sprint Cup	Toksport WRT	10	0	0	0	0	25	10th
2021	GT World Challenge Europe Sprint Cup – Silver	Toksport WRT	10	1	1	0	6	80	4th
2021	GT World Challenge Europe Endurance Cup	Madpanda Motorsport	1	0	0	0	0	0	NC
2021	GT World Challenge Europe Endurance Cup – Silver	Madpanda Motorsport	1	0	0	0	0	2	32nd
2022	GT World Challenge Europe Endurance Cup	Attempto Racing	3	0	0	0	0	1	35th
2022	GT World Challenge Europe Endurance Cup – Silver	Attempto Racing	1	0	0	0	1	31	11th
2022	Nürburgring Langstrecken-Serie – BMW M240i	Schnitzelalm Racing	2	0	0	0	0		
2022	ADAC GT Masters	Madpanda Motorsport	2	0	0	0	0	0	NC
2023	Nürburgring Langstrecken-Serie – BMW M240i	Schnitzelalm Racing	2	0	0	0	2	19	13th
2023	Nürburgring Langstrecken-Serie – SP9 Pro-Am	Schnitzelalm Racing	1	0	0	0	0	0	NC
2023	GT Cup Open Europe – Pro-Am	GDL Racing	1	0	0	0	0	0	15th

* Season still in progress.

^{†} As Puhakka was a guest driver, he was ineligible for points.

=== Complete Formula Renault 1.6 Nordic results ===
(key) (Races in bold indicate pole position; races in italics indicate fastest lap)

Year	Team	1	2	3	4	5	6	7	8	9	10	11	12	13	14	15	DC	Points
2015	FinnDrive	SKÖ; 1; 6	SKÖ; 2; 5	AND; 1; 6	AND; 2 Ret	AND; 3; 6	AHV; 1; 2	AHV; 2; 4	FAL; 1; 3	FAL; 2; 2	FAL; 3; 1	KIN; 1; 7	KIN; 2; 2	**SOL**; 1	KNU; 1; 5	KNU; 2; 4	3rd	195
2016	FinnDrive	SKÖ; 1; 1	**SKÖ**; **2** Ret	MAN; 1; 2	MAN; 2; 1	AND; 1; 2	AND; 2; 2	**FAL**; **1** Ret	**FAL**; **2**; 1	KAR; 1; 2	KAR; 2; 7	**ALA**; **1**; 6	**ALA**; **2**; 6	KNU; 1; 2	KNU; 2; 2		2nd	214

=== Complete F4 Spanish Championship results ===
(key) (Races in bold indicate pole position) (Races in italics indicate fastest lap)

Year	Team	1	2	3	4	5	6	7	8	9	10	11	12	13	14	15	16	17	18	19	20	Pos	Points
2016	MP Motorsport	NAV; 1; 9	NAV; 2; 8	NAV; 3; 3																		NC†	0†
2016	Double R Racing				ARA; 1 Ret	ARA; 2; 5	ARA; 3; 4	ALG; 1	ALG; 2	ALG; 3	VAL; 1	VAL; 2	VAL; 3	CAT; 1	CAT; 2	JAR; 1	JAR; 2	JAR; 3	JER; 1 Ret	JER; 2 Ret	JER; 3; 4	NC†	0†
2017	SMP Racing	ARA; 1 Ret	ARA; 2; 4	ARA; 3; 10	NAV1; 1	NAV1; 2	NAV1; 3	CAT; 1	CAT; 2	JER; 1	JER; 2	JER; 3										14th	11
2017	Kart in Club Driving Academy												NAV2; 1; 9	NAV2; 2; 13	NAV2; 3; 14	NOG; 1	NOG; 2	NOG; 3	EST; 1	EST; 2	EST; 3	14th	11

^{†} As Puhakka was a guest driver, he was ineligible for points

=== Complete SMP F4 Championship results ===
(key) (Races in bold indicate pole position) (Races in italics indicate fastest lap)

Year	Team	1	2	3	4	5	6	7	8	9	10	11	12	13	14	15	16	17	18	19	20	21	Pos	Points
2017	Lappalainen Team	SOC; 1; 6	SOC; 2; 12	SOC; 3; 9	SMO; 1; 1	SMO; 2 DSQ	SMO; 3; 5	AHV; 1; 10	AHV; 2; 5	AHV; 3; 2	AUD; 1; 3	AUD; 2; 6	AUD; 3 Ret	MSC1; 1; 10	MSC1; 2; 9	MSC1; 3; 2	MSC2; 1; 10	MSC2; 2; 7	MSC2; 3; 7	ASS; 1; 4	ASS; 2; 8	ASS; 3; 8	7th	136

=== Complete GT World Challenge Europe results ===
==== GT World Challenge Europe Sprint Cup ====
Year	Team	Car	Class	1	2	3	4	5	6	7	8	9	10	Pos.	Points
2020	Toksport WRT	Mercedes-AMG GT3 Evo	Silver	MIS; 1 WD	MIS; 2 WD	MIS; 3 WD	MAG; 1; 8	MAG; 2; 8	ZAN; 1; 13	ZAN; 2; 5	CAT; 1; 9	**CAT**; **2**; 7	CAT; 3 Ret	4th	69
2021	Toksport WRT	Mercedes-AMG GT3 Evo	Silver	MAG; 1; 7	MAG; 2; 23	ZAN; 1; 5	ZAN; 2; 10	MIS; 1; 10	MIS; 2; 9	BRH; 1; 6	**BRH**; **2**; 4	**VAL**; **1** Ret	VAL; 2; 8	4th	80

==== GT World Challenge Europe Endurance Cup ====
Year	Team	Car	Class	1	2	3	4	5	6	7	Pos.	Points
2020	Madpanda Motorsport	Mercedes-AMG GT3 Evo	Silver	IMO	NÜR	SPA; 6H; 41	SPA; 12H; 34	SPA; 24H; 26	LEC		20th	16
2021	Madpanda Motorsport	Mercedes-AMG GT3 Evo	Silver	MNZ	LEC	SPA; 6H	SPA; 12H	SPA; 24H	NÜR	CAT; 23	32nd	2
2022	Attempto Racing	Audi R8 LMS Evo II	Pro	IMO; Ret	LEC; 10						35th	1
2022	Attempto Racing	Audi R8 LMS Evo II	Silver			SPA; 6H; 30	SPA; 12H; 13	SPA; 24H; 15	HOC	CAT	11th	31

=== Complete ADAC GT Masters results ===
(key) (Races in bold indicate pole position) (Races in italics indicate fastest lap)

Year	Team	Car	1	2	3	4	5	6	7	8	9	10	11	12	13	14	DC	Points
2022	Madpanda Motorsport	Mercedes-AMG GT3 Evo	OSC; 1	OSC; 2	RBR; 1	RBR; 2	ZAN; 1	ZAN; 2	NÜR; 1	NÜR; 2	LAU; 1; 19	LAU; 2; 19†	SAC; 1	SAC; 2	HOC; 1	HOC; 2	NC	0
