= 2019 Lamborghini Super Trofeo Asia =

International motor racing series

The 2019 Lamborghini Super Trofeo Asia was the eighth season of the Lamborghini Super Trofeo Asia. The season began on April 6 at Sepang International Circuit, and ended on October 25 with the World Final at Jerez.

The Pro championship was won by Chris van der Drift and Evan Chen of Gama Racing. Hojust Racing's Afiq Yazid and Toshiyuki Ochiai wrapped up the Pro-Am championship title while Huilin Han won the Am class honours.

== Calendar ==
The calendar for the 2019 season was unveiled in November 2018.

Rnd.	Circuit	Date	Supporting
1	Sepang International Circuit, Selangor, Malaysia	6–7 April	Blancpain GT World Challenge Asia; Formula 4 South East Asia Championship; F3 Asian Championship
2	Suzuka Circuit, Suzuka, Japan	22–23 June	Blancpain GT World Challenge Asia; F3 Asian Championship
3	Fuji Speedway, Shizuoka Prefecture, Japan	6–7 July	Blancpain GT World Challenge Asia
4	Korea International Circuit, Yeongam County, South Korea	3–4 August	Blancpain GT World Challenge Asia
5	Shanghai International Circuit, Shanghai, China	7–8 September	Chinese Grand Prix; F4 Chinese Championship; F3 Asian Championship
6	Circuito de Jerez, Andalusia, Spain	24–25 October	Lamborghini Super Trofeo World Finals
WF	Circuito de Jerez, Andalusia, Spain	26–27 October	Lamborghini Super Trofeo World Finals

== Teams and drivers ==
Team	No.	Drivers	Class	Rounds
(Hong Kong) 852 Challengers	4	(Hong Kong) Henry Kwong	LC	5
(Hong Kong) 852 Challengers	4	(Hong Kong) Michael Soong	LC	5
(Hong Kong) 852 Challengers	28	(Italy) Davide Rizzo		1
(Hong Kong) 852 Challengers	28	(Hong Kong) Kin-Pong Clerebold Chan	LC	5
(Hong Kong) 852 Challengers	28	(Italy) Massimiliano Wiser	PA	6
(Hong Kong) 852 Challengers	28	(Thailand) Supachai Weeraborwornpong	PA	6
(Hong Kong) 852 Challengers	44	(Hong Kong) Clement Li	LC	1–3, 5–6
(Hong Kong) 852 Challengers	44	(Hong Kong) Paul Wong	LC	1–3, 6
(China) FFF Racing Team	6	(China) Yue Lin	Am	1–3
(China) FFF Racing Team	63	(Finland) Juuso Puhakka	P	All
(China) FFF Racing Team	63	(Japan) Takashi Kasai	P	All
(Germany) Leipert Motorsport	7	(New Zealand) Brendon Leitch	PA	All
(Germany) Leipert Motorsport	7	(Singapore) Keong Wee Lim	PA	1
(Germany) Leipert Motorsport	7	(Italy) Massimo Vignali	PA	2–3, 5–6
(Germany) Leipert Motorsport	7	(United Kingdom) Jake Rattenbury	PA	4
(Germany) Leipert Motorsport	77	(Hong Kong) Dan Wells	PA	4–6
(Germany) Leipert Motorsport	77	(Hong Kong) Philip Kadoorie	PA	4–6
(Hong Kong) Kamlung Racing Team	8	(Hong Kong) Kenneth Lau	Am	1–2, 4
(Hong Kong) Kamlung Racing Team	8	(Hong Kong) Michael Choi	Am	1–2
(Hong Kong) Kamlung Racing Team	8	(Hong Kong) Mak Hing Tak	LC	3
(Hong Kong) Kamlung Racing Team	8	(Macau) Alex Liu	LC	3
(Hong Kong) Kamlung Racing Team	8	(France) Maxime Jousse	P	5
(Hong Kong) Kamlung Racing Team	8	(France) Norman Nato	P	5
(Hong Kong) Kamlung Racing Team	22	(Hong Kong) Yak Lung Siu	LC	1
(San Marino) GDL Racing	11	(Australia) Tony Walls	LC	5
(San Marino) GDL Racing	47	(Australia) Daniel Stutterd	PA	1–4
(San Marino) GDL Racing	47	(Australia) Richard Muscat	PA	1–4
(San Marino) GDL Racing	88	(Italy) Gabriele Murroni	LC	All
(San Marino) GDL Racing	97	(New Zealand) Sam Fillmore	LC	2
(San Marino) GDL Racing	99	(Hong Kong) Chong Yan Runme Wong	LC	1
(San Marino) GDL Racing	99	(Hong Kong) Sui Lung Gary Cheung	LC	1
(San Marino) GDL Racing	99	(Hong Kong) Samson Chan	LC	2
(San Marino) GDL Racing	99	(Japan) Takeshi Matsumoto	Am	3
(San Marino) GDL Racing	99	(Hong Kong) Paul Wong	LC	5
(Malaysia) Tedco Racing	18	(Indonesia) Andrew Haryanto	Am	1
(Japan) YH Racing	30	(Japan) Kei Cozzolino	PA	1
(Japan) YH Racing	30	(Japan) Takamichi Matsuda	PA	1
(Japan) YH Racing	30	(Japan) Takamichi Matsuda	LC	2–6
(Japan) YH Racing	30	(Japan) Dai Yoshihara	LC	2–6
(Japan) Hojust Racing	38	(Japan) Toshiyuki Ochiai	PA	All
(Japan) Hojust Racing	38	(Malaysia) Afiq Yazid	PA	All
(China) T Squared Racing	39	(China) Huilin Han	Am	All
(China) D1 Racing Team	55	(Singapore) Yuey Tan	Am	1
(China) D1 Racing Team	89	(Hong Kong) Henry Kwong	PA	3
(China) D1 Racing Team	89	(Italy) Massimiliano Wiser	PA	3
(Thailand) PSC Motorsports	57	(Thailand) Sarun Sereethoranakul	Am	All
(Thailand) PSC Motorsports	57	(Thailand) Saravat Sereethoranakul	Am	All
(Italy) VSR	66	(Hong Kong) Alex Au	PA	1–3, 6
(Italy) VSR	66	(Italy) Edoardo Liberati	PA	1
(Italy) VSR	66	(Japan) Yuki Nemoto	PA	2–3, 6
(Italy) VSR	98	(Malaysia) Kumar Prabakaran	LC	All
(Chinese Taipei) Gama Racing	68	(New Zealand) Chris van der Drift	P	All
(Chinese Taipei) Gama Racing	68	(Chinese Taipei) Evan Chen	P	All
(Malaysia) Ayelzo Motorsport	69	(Malaysia) Zen Low	Am	All
(Malaysia) Ayelzo Motorsport	69	(Hong Kong) Angelo Negro	Am	1–3, 5–6
(Malaysia) Ayelzo Motorsport	69	(South Korea) Doyun Hwang	Am	4
(Japan) Promotion Racing	77	(Japan) Jun Tashiro	Am	2–3
(Japan) Promotion Racing	77	(Japan) Satoshi Furuta	Am	2–3
True Visions Motorsport Thailand	78	(Thailand) Suttiluck Buncharoen	Am	2–6

Icon	Class
P	Pro Cup
PA	Pro-Am Cup
Am	Am Cup
LC	Lamborghini Cup
	Guest Starter

== Race results ==
Round		Circuit	Pole Position	Pro Winners	Pro-Am Winners	Am Winners	LC Winners
1	R1	(Malaysia) Sepang	(China) No. 63 FFF Racing Team	(Chinese Taipei) No. 68 Gama Racing	(Japan) No. 38 Hojust Racing	(Malaysia) No. 18 Tedco Racing	(Hong Kong) No. 44 852 Challengers
1	R1	(Malaysia) Sepang	(Finland) Juuso Puhakka (Japan) Takashi Kasai	(New Zealand) Chris van der Drift (Chinese Taipei) Evan Chen	(Japan) Toshiyuki Ochiai (Malaysia) Afiq Yazid	(Indonesia) Andrew Haryanto	(Hong Kong) Paul Wong (Hong Kong) Clement Li
1	R2	(Malaysia) Sepang	(Japan) No. 38 Hojust Racing	(Chinese Taipei) No. 68 Gama Racing	(Italy) No. 66 VSR	(China) No. 39 T Squared Racing	(Hong Kong) No. 44 852 Challengers
1	R2	(Malaysia) Sepang	(Japan) Toshiyuki Ochiai (Malaysia) Afiq Yazid	(New Zealand) Chris van der Drift (Chinese Taipei) Evan Chen	(Hong Kong) Alex Au (Italy) Edoardo Liberati	(China) Huilin Han	(Hong Kong) Paul Wong (Hong Kong) Clement Li
2	R1	(Japan) Suzuka	(China) No. 63 FFF Racing Team	(China) No. 63 FFF Racing Team	(Italy) No. 66 VSR	(China) No. 39 T Squared Racing	(Japan) No. 30 YH Racing
2	R1	(Japan) Suzuka	(Finland) Juuso Puhakka (Japan) Takashi Kasai	(Finland) Juuso Puhakka (Japan) Takashi Kasai	(Hong Kong) Alex Au (Japan) Yuki Nemoto	(China) Huilin Han	(Japan) Dai Yoshihara (Japan) Takamichi Matsuda
2	R2	(Japan) Suzuka	(Japan) No. 38 Hojust Racing	(Chinese Taipei) No. 68 Gama Racing	(Germany) No. 7 Leipert Motorsport	(China) No. 39 T Squared Racing	(Hong Kong) No. 44 852 Challengers
2	R2	(Japan) Suzuka	(Japan) Toshiyuki Ochiai (Malaysia) Afiq Yazid	(New Zealand) Chris van der Drift (Chinese Taipei) Evan Chen	(New Zealand) Brendon Leitch (Italy) Massimo Vignali	(China) Huilin Han	(Hong Kong) Paul Wong (Hong Kong) Clement Li
3	R1	(Japan) Fuji	(Chinese Taipei) No. 68 Gama Racing	(Chinese Taipei) No. 68 Gama Racing	(Japan) No. 38 Hojust Racing	(Japan) No. 77 Promotion Racing	(Hong Kong) No. 44 852 Challengers
3	R1	(Japan) Fuji	(New Zealand) Chris van der Drift (Chinese Taipei) Evan Chen	(New Zealand) Chris van der Drift (Chinese Taipei) Evan Chen	(Japan) Toshiyuki Ochiai (Malaysia) Afiq Yazid	(Japan) Jun Tashiro (Japan) Satoshi Furuta	(Hong Kong) Paul Wong (Hong Kong) Clement Li
3	R2	(Japan) Fuji	(China) No. 89 D1 Racing Team	(China) No. 63 FFF Racing Team	(Japan) No. 38 Hojust Racing	(Japan) No. 77 Promotion Racing	(Japan) No. 30 YH Racing
3	R2	(Japan) Fuji	(Hong Kong) Henry Kwong (Italy) Massimiliano Wiser	(Finland) Juuso Puhakka (Japan) Takashi Kasai	(Japan) Toshiyuki Ochiai (Malaysia) Afiq Yazid	(Japan) Jun Tashiro (Japan) Satoshi Furuta	(Japan) Dai Yoshihara (Japan) Takamichi Matsuda
4	R1	(South Korea) Korea		(Chinese Taipei) No. 68 Gama Racing	(Japan) No. 38 Hojust Racing	(China) No. 39 T Squared Racing	(Japan) No. 30 YH Racing
4	R1	(South Korea) Korea		(New Zealand) Chris van der Drift (Chinese Taipei) Evan Chen	(Japan) Toshiyuki Ochiai (Malaysia) Afiq Yazid	(China) Huilin Han	(Japan) Dai Yoshihara (Japan) Takamichi Matsuda
4	R2	(South Korea) Korea		(China) No. 63 FFF Racing Team	(Germany) No. 7 Leipert Motorsport	(Malaysia) No. 69 Ayelzo Motorsport	(Japan) No. 30 YH Racing
4	R2	(South Korea) Korea		(Finland) Juuso Puhakka (Japan) Takashi Kasai	(New Zealand) Brendon Leitch (United Kingdom) Jake Rattenbury	(Malaysia) Zen Low (Japan) Doyun Hwang	(Japan) Dai Yoshihara (Japan) Takamichi Matsuda
5	R1	(China) Shanghai		(Hong Kong) No. 8 Kamlung Racing	(Japan) No. 38 Hojust Racing	(Thailand) No. 57 PSC Motorsports	(Japan) No. 30 YH Racing
5	R1	(China) Shanghai		(France) Maxime Jousse (France) Norman Nato	(Japan) Toshiyuki Ochiai (Malaysia) Afiq Yazid	(Thailand) Sarun Sereethoranakul (Thailand) Saravat Sereethoranakul	(Japan) Dai Yoshihara (Japan) Takamichi Matsuda
5	R2	(China) Shanghai		(Chinese Taipei) No. 68 Gama Racing	(Japan) No. 38 Hojust Racing	(China) No. 39 T Squared Racing	(San Marino) No. 88 GDL Racing
5	R2	(China) Shanghai		(New Zealand) Chris van der Drift (Chinese Taipei) Evan Chen	(Japan) Toshiyuki Ochiai (Malaysia) Afiq Yazid	(China) Huilin Han	(Italy) Gabriele Murroni
6	R1	(Spain) Jerez	(Italy) No. 66 VSR	(Chinese Taipei) No. 68 Gama Racing	(Japan) No. 38 Hojust Racing	(China) No. 39 T Squared Racing	(Japan) No. 30 YH Racing
6	R1	(Spain) Jerez	(Hong Kong) Alex Au (Japan) Yuki Nemoto	(New Zealand) Chris van der Drift (Chinese Taipei) Evan Chen	(Japan) Toshiyuki Ochiai (Malaysia) Afiq Yazid	(China) Huilin Han	(Japan) Dai Yoshihara (Japan) Takamichi Matsuda
6	R2	(Spain) Jerez	(China) No. 63 FFF Racing Team	(Chinese Taipei) No. 68 Gama Racing	(Italy) No. 66 VSR	(China) No. 39 T Squared Racing	(Japan) No. 30 YH Racing
6	R2	(Spain) Jerez	(Finland) Juuso Puhakka (Japan) Takashi Kasai	(New Zealand) Chris van der Drift (Chinese Taipei) Evan Chen	(Hong Kong) Alex Au (Japan) Yuki Nemoto	(China) Huilin Han	(Japan) Dai Yoshihara (Japan) Takamichi Matsuda

== Championship standings ==
=== Scoring system ===
Position	1st	2nd	3rd	4th	5th	6th	7th	8th	9th	10th	Pole
Points	15	12	10	8	6	5	4	3	2	1	1

=== Pro ===
Pos.	Driver	Team	(Malaysia) SEP		(Japan) SUZ		(Japan) FUJ		(South Korea) KOR		(China) SHA		(Spain) JER		Pts
Pos.	Driver	Team	R1	R2	R1	R2	R1	R2	R1	R2	R1	R2	R1	R2	Pts
1	(New Zealand) Chris van der Drift (Chinese Taipei) Evan Chen	(Chinese Taipei) Gama Racing	1	1	DSQ	1	1	2	1	2	3	1	1	1	
2	(Finland) Juuso Puhakka (Japan) Takashi Kasai	(China) FFF Racing Team	2	2	1	2	2	1	2	1	2	3	2	2	
3	(France) Maxime Jousse (France) Norman Nato	(Hong Kong) Kamlung Racing									1	2			
Pos.	Driver	Team	R1	R2	R1	R2	R1	R2	R1	R2	R1	R2	R1	R2	Pts
Pos.	Driver	Team	(Malaysia) SEP		(Japan) SUZ		(Japan) FUJ		(South Korea) KOR		(China) SHA		(Spain) JER		Pts

=== Pro-Am ===
Pos.	Driver	Team	(Malaysia) SEP		(Japan) SUZ		(Japan) FUJ		(South Korea) KOR		(China) SHA		(Spain) JER		Pts
Pos.	Driver	Team	R1	R2	R1	R2	R1	R2	R1	R2	R1	R2	R1	R2	Pts
1	(Japan) Toshiyuki Ochiai (Malaysia) Afiq Yazid	(Japan) Hojust Racing	1	2	2	4	1	1	1	2	1	1			139
2	(New Zealand) Brendon Leitch	(Germany) Leipert Motorsport	5	3	3	1	4	3	2	1	3	2			111
3	(Hong Kong) Alex Au	(Italy) VSR	2	1	1	3	2	2							77
4	(Australia) Daniel Stutterd (Australia) Richard Muscat	(San Marino) GDL Racing	3	4	4	2	5	5	3	3					70
5	(Italy) Massimo Vignali	(Germany) Leipert Motorsport			3	1	4	3			3	2			67
6	(Japan) Yuki Nemoto	(Italy) VSR			1	3	2	2							49
7	(Hong Kong) Dan Wells (Hong Kong) Philip Kadoorie	(Germany) Leipert Motorsport							4	4	2	3			38
8	(Italy) Edoardo Liberati	(Italy) VSR	2	1											28
8	(United Kingdom) Jake Rattenbury	(Germany) Leipert Motorsport							2	1					28
10	(Hong Kong) Henry Kwong (Italy) Massimiliano Wiser	(China) D1 Racing Team					3	4							19
11	(Singapore) Keong Wee Lim	(Germany) Leipert Motorsport	5	3											16
12	(Japan) Kei Cozzolino (Japan) Takamichi Matsuda	(Japan) YH Racing	4	5											14
Pos.	Driver	Team	R1	R2	R1	R2	R1	R2	R1	R2	R1	R2	R1	R2	Pts
Pos.	Driver	Team	(Malaysia) SEP		(Japan) SUZ		(Japan) FUJ		(South Korea) KOR		(China) SHA		(Spain) JER		Pts

=== Am ===
Pos.	Driver	Team	(Malaysia) SEP		(Japan) SUZ		(Japan) FUJ		(South Korea) KOR		(China) SHA		(Spain) JER		Pts
Pos.	Driver	Team	R1	R2	R1	R2	R1	R2	R1	R2	R1	R2	R1	R2	Pts
1	(China) Huilin Han	(China) T Squared Racing	2	1	1	1	Ret	3	1	3	2	1			122
2	(Thailand) Sarun Sereethoranakul (Thailand) Saravut Sereethoranakul	(Thailand) PSC Motorsports	4	2	3	4	2	4	3	2	1	4			105
3	(Malaysia) Zen Low	(Malaysia) Ayelzo Motorsport	3	4	5	Ret	Ret	6	2	1	3	2			79
4	(Thailand) Suttiluck Buncharoen	True Vision Motorsport Thailand			6	2	3	5	4	4	4	3			67
5	(Japan) Jun Tashiro (Japan) Satoshi Furuta	(Japan) Promotion Racing			4	3	1	1							51
6	(Hong Kong) Angelo Negro	(Malaysia) Ayelzo Motorsport	3	4	5	Ret	Ret	6			3	2			51
7	(China) Yue Lin	(China) FFF Racing Team	Ret	3	2	5	4	2							49
8	(South Korea) Doyun Hwang	(Malaysia) Ayelzo Motorsport							2	1					28
9	(Indonesia) Andrew Haryanto	(Malaysia) Tedco Racing	1	Ret											15
10	(Hong Kong) Kenneth Lau (Hong Kong) Michael Choi	(Hong Kong) Kamlung Racing Team	5	5											12
12	(Singapore) Yuey Tan	(Japan) D1 Racing Team	DNS	Ret											0
13	(Japan) Takashi Matsumoto	(San Marino) GDL Racing					Ret	Ret							0
Pos.	Driver	Team	R1	R2	R1	R2	R1	R2	R1	R2	R1	R2	R1	R2	Pts
Pos.	Driver	Team	(Malaysia) SEP		(Japan) SUZ		(Japan) FUJ		(South Korea) KOR		(China) SHA		(Spain) JER		Pts

=== LC Cup ===
Pos.	Driver	Team	(Malaysia) SEP		(Japan) SUZ		(Japan) FUJ		(South Korea) KOR		(China) SHA		(Spain) JER		Pts
Pos.	Driver	Team	R1	R2	R1	R2	R1	R2	R1	R2	R1	R2	R1	R2	Pts
1	(Hong Kong) Paul Wong (Hong Kong) Clement Li	(Hong Kong) 852 Challengers	1	1	3	1	1	2	2	2					85
2	(Japan) Dai Yoshihara (Japan) Takamichi Matsuda	(Japan) YH Racing			1	3	2	1	1	1					53
3	(Italy) Gabriele Murroni	(San Marino) GDL Racing	2	4	Ret	5	3	3	3	3					47
4	(Malaysia) Kumar Prabakaran	(Italy) VSR	4	3	5	7	5	5	5	4					40
5	(Hong Kong) Chong Yau Runme Wong (Hong Kong) Gary Cheung	(San Marino) GDL Racing	3	2											23
6	(New Zealand) Sam Fillmore	(San Marino) GDL Racing			2	4									20
7	(Hong Kong) Mak Hing Tak (Macau) Alex Liu	(Hong Kong) Kamlung Racing Team					4	4							16
8	(Hong Kong) Kenneth Lau (Hong Kong) Michael Choi	(Hong Kong) Kamlung Racing Team			4	6			4	5					13
9	(Hong Kong) Samson Chan	(San Marino) GDL Racing			Ret	2									12
10	(Hong Kong) Yak Lung Siu	(Hong Kong) Kamlung Racing Team	5	Ret											6
Pos.	Driver	Team	R1	R2	R1	R2	R1	R2	R1	R2	R1	R2	R1	R2	Pts
Pos.	Driver	Team	(Malaysia) SEP		(Japan) SUZ		(Japan) FUJ		(South Korea) KOR		(China) SHA		(Spain) JER		Pts
