= Andrew Haryanto =

Indonesian racing driver (born 1977)

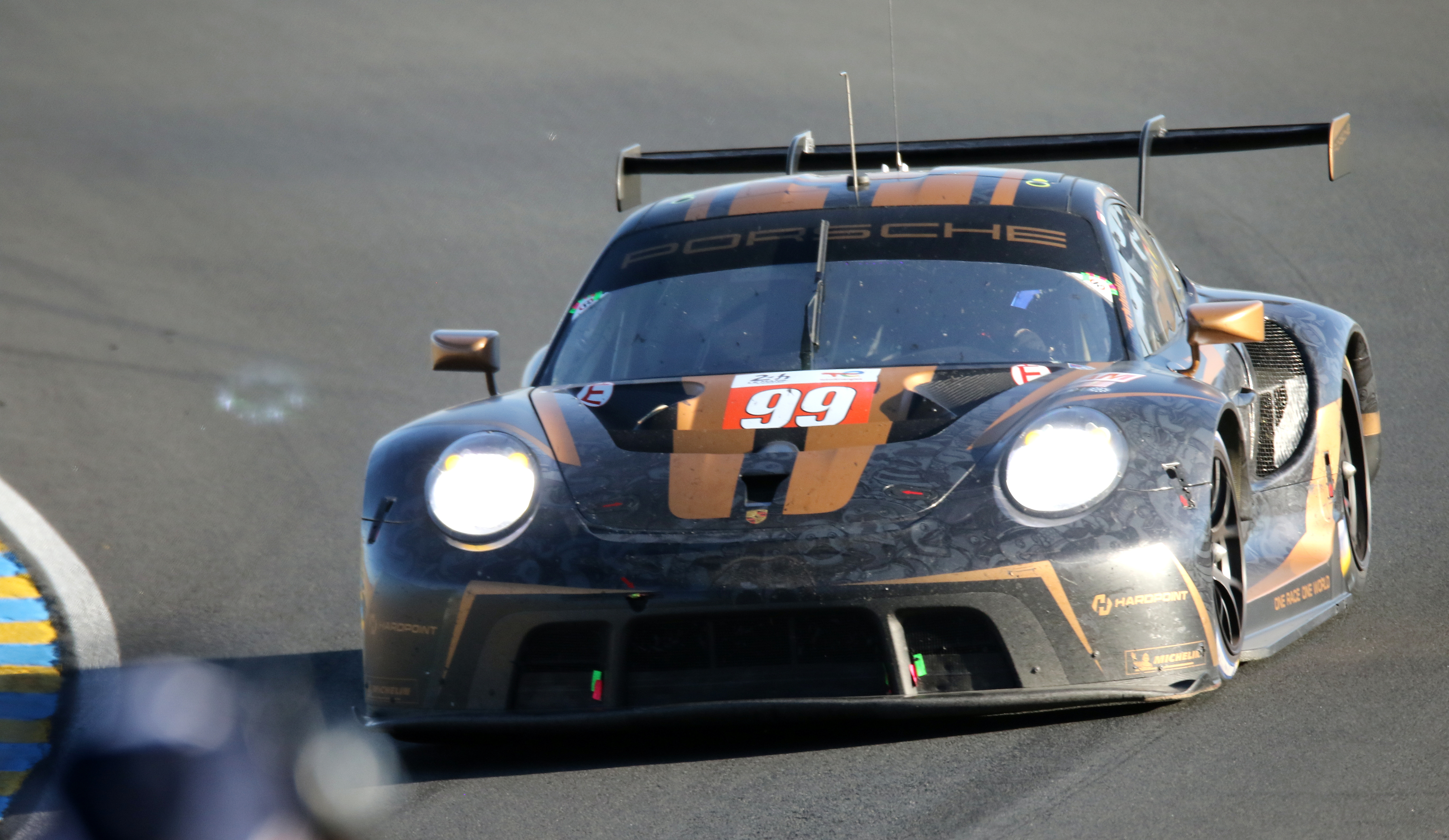
- Haryanto in 2022
- Nationality: (Indonesia) Indonesian
- Born: 15 May 1977 (age 49) Bandung, Indonesia
- Categorisation: FIA Bronze

Championship titles
- 2018 2017 2016, 2017: Audi R8 LMS Cup; Lamborghini Super Trofeo Middle East – Am; Lamborghini Super Trofeo Asia – Am

Andrew Haryanto (born 15 May 1977), also known by his pseudonyms André Canard, Andrea Anatra and Andrés Pato, is an Indonesian racing driver who last competed in GT World Challenge Asia for Audi Sport Asia Team Phantom.

He is not related to the former Formula One driver Rio Haryanto.

== Career ==
Haryanto made his car racing debut in 2013, competing at the Sepang 1000 km for Tedco Racing. Moving to Lamborghini Super Trofeo Asia for the following year, Haryanto raced in the series full-time across the next three seasons, winning the Am title in 2016 and 2017. During 2017, Haryanto also won the Lamborghini Super Trofeo Middle East Am title, as well as racing for X-One Motorsports in Blancpain GT Series Asia, finishing runner-up in the Am standings with five wins to his name. Two seasons in the Audi R8 LMS Cup then ensued, during which Haryanto won the title with ProMax Team in 2018, before following that up with a third-place points finish with Absolute Racing in 2019. During both years, Haryanto raced at the 24 Hours of Spa and also made a one-off return in Blancpain GT World Challenge Asia for HubAuto Corsa.

Haryanto has been a mainstay of Absolute Racing's GT3 endeavours, driving for them in Porsche, Audi, Ferrari and Lamborghini cars.

In 2020, Haryanto was originally set to make his full-season debut in GT World Challenge Asia for the new Bentley JMW Motorsport alliance, but those plans fell through when the season was cancelled due to the COVID-19 pandemic. The following year, Haryanto joined Porsche-affiliated Dempsey-Proton Racing to race in select rounds of the FIA World Endurance Championship in LMGTE Am the following year. Following a best result of fifth at the 6 Hours of Spa-Francorchamps, Haryanto made a standalone appearance at the 24 Hours of Le Mans for Proton-run Absolute Racing, in which he finished seventh in LMGTE Am. Remaining with the team for 2022, Haryanto continued in LMGTE competition as he made his debut in the European Le Mans Series. In his only season in the series, Haryanto scored a lone podium at Spa to take seventh in the class standings. During 2022, Haryanto also raced again at the 24 Hours of Le Mans after Absolute took over Hardpoint Motorsport's entry.

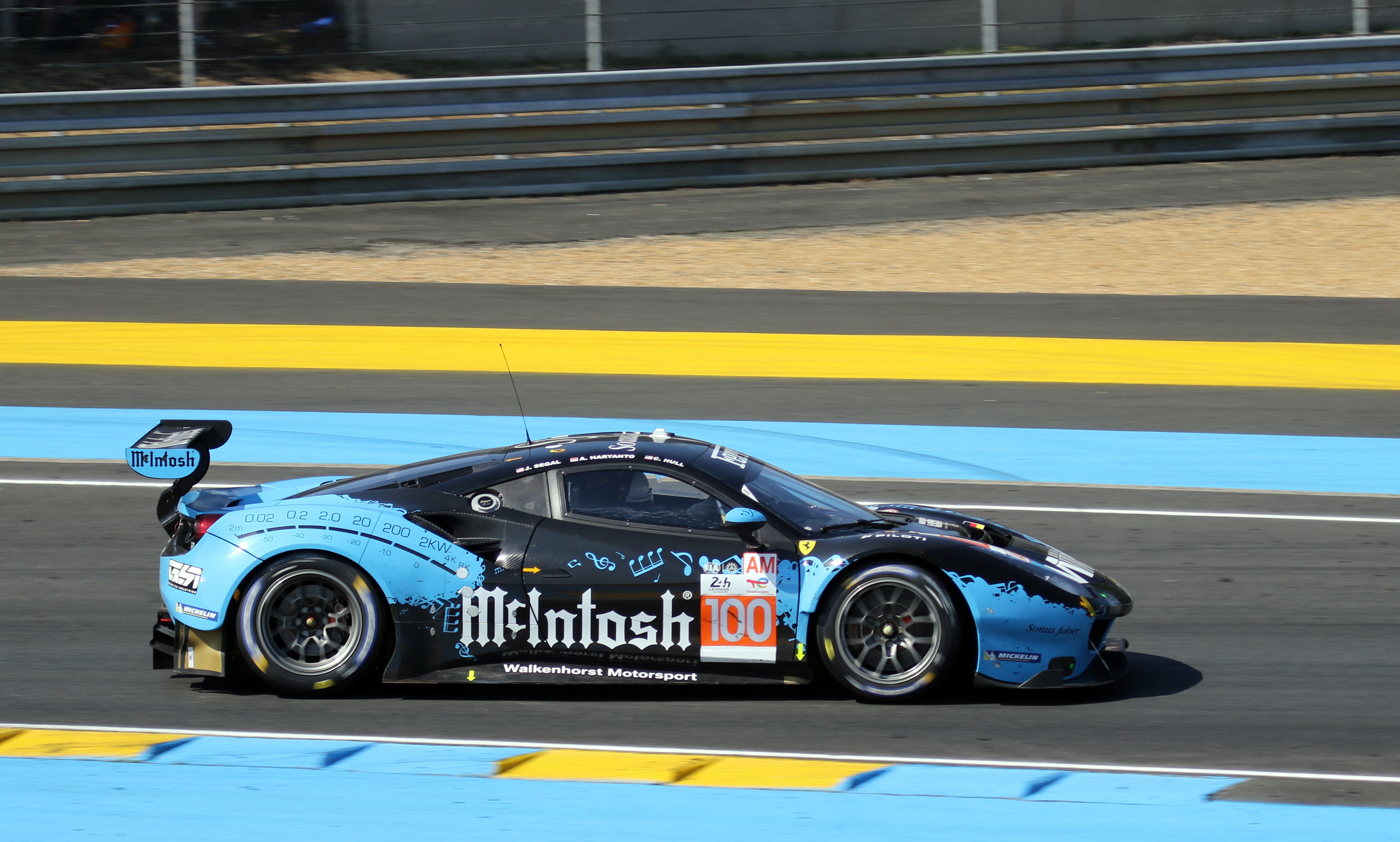
Haryanto returned to the 24 Hours of Le Mans in 2023 with Walkenhorst.

Returning to Asia for 2023, Haryanto began the year by winning the Sepang 12 Hours with Absolute Racing, before continuing with the Audi-linked team to make his full-time return to GT World Challenge Asia, alongside Yu Kuai. Racing in Pro-Am, Haryanto scored outright wins at Motegi and Sepang en route to sixth in the class' standings. During 2023, Haryanto also returned to the 24 Hours of Le Mans, racing for AF Corse-backed Walkenhorst Motorsport in LMGTE Am.

Switching to the team's Ferrari-fielding Absolute Corse banner for 2024, Haryanto also switched to a Filipino licence and began racing under the name André Canard. Alongside Finn Gehrsitz, Haryanto scored a best outright result of fourth and class finish of second at Suzuka, and scored three other class podiums to take seventh in points. During 2024, Haryanto also raced a Porsche 911 with the same team at the Sepang 12 Hours, and was set to make his GT World Challenge Australia debut for Aston Martin customer team Volante Rosso Motorsport, but ultimately wasn't able to start the race as the car hit technical troubles. In 2025, Haryanto only drove in the Mandalika round of GT World Challenge Asia in an Absolute Corse-operated Lamborghini Huracan GT3 Evo, alongside Edoardo Mortara, under the name Andrea Anatra as he reverted to an Indonesian licence.

The following year, Haryanto adopted the Andrés Pato identity as he competed in the Bathurst 12 Hour for Volante Rosso Motorsport. During the weekend of the Australian enduro, Haryanto confirmed that his new pseudonym was likely going to be the last one he would use, but was going to retain it for the rest of the year. After scoring a GT3 Pro-Am podium in Australia, Haryanto returned to full-time GT World Challenge Asia competition as he joined Audi Sport Asia Team Phantom to race in the Pro-Am class alongside Jaxon Evans. In the six-round season, Haryanto took an overall win at Okayama, as well as a class win at Mandalika to end the year sixth in Pro-Am.

== Racing record ==
=== Racing career summary ===
Season	Series	Team	Races	Wins	Poles	F/Laps	Podiums	Points	Position
2013	Sepang 1000 km	Tedco Racing	1	0	0	0	0	—N/a	4th
2014	Lamborghini Super Trofeo Asia								
2015	Lamborghini Super Trofeo Asia – Am		2		2				
2016	Lamborghini Super Trofeo Asia – Am								**1st**
2017	Lamborghini Super Trofeo Middle East – Am	GDL Racing	6	3	2	1	5	69	**1st**
2017	Lamborghini Super Trofeo Asia – Am	X-One Racing Team	10	9	7	6	10	154	**1st**
2017	Blancpain GT Series Asia – GT3	X-One Racing Team	8	0	0	0	0	2	32nd
2017	Blancpain GT Series Asia – GT3 Am	X-One Racing Team	8	5	5	1	8	173	**2nd**
2017	Lamborghini Super Trofeo World Final – Am	X-One Racing Team	2	0	0	0	0	0	NC
2018	Audi R8 LMS Cup	ProMax Team	10	3	2	5	8	186	**1st**
2018	Lamborghini Super Trofeo Asia – Am	Top Speed Racing	2	0	0	0	2	24	7th
2018	Blancpain GT Series Endurance Cup – Group N	GDL Racing	1	0	0	0	0	0	NC†
2018	Audi R8 LMS Cup – Invitational Race	Absolute Racing	1	0	0	0	0	—N/a	5th
2019	Blancpain GT World Challenge Asia – GT3	HubAuto Corsa	2	0	0	0	0	0	NC
2019	Blancpain GT World Challenge Asia – GT3 Am	HubAuto Corsa	2	0	0	0	1	27	7th
2019	Audi R8 LMS Cup	Absolute Racing	10	2	3	2	5	132	**3rd**
2019	Blancpain GT Series Endurance Cup	Audi Sport R8 LMS Cup	1	0	0	0	0	0	NC
2019	Blancpain GT Series Endurance Cup – Am	Audi Sport R8 LMS Cup	1	0	0	0	0	1	29th
2019	Porsche Carrera Cup Asia	Zheng Tong Auto	3	0	0	0	0	7	24th
2019	Lamborghini Super Trofeo Asia – Am	Tedco Racing	2	1	0	1	1	15	9th
2021	FIA World Endurance Championship – LMGTE Am	Dempsey-Proton Racing	2	0	0	0	0	18	17th
2021	24 Hours of Le Mans – LMGTE Am	Absolute Racing	1	0	0	0	0	—N/a	7th
2022	European Le Mans Series – LMGTE	Absolute Racing	6	0	0	0	1	49	7th
2022	24 Hours of Le Mans – LMGTE Am	Hardpoint Motorsport	1	0	0	0	0	—N/a	11th
2023	Sepang 12 Hours	Absolute Racing	1	1	0	0	1	—N/a	**1st**
2023	GT World Challenge Asia – GT3	Audi Sport Asia Team Absolute	12	2	1	0	2	90	8th
2023	GT World Challenge Asia – GT3 Pro-Am	Audi Sport Asia Team Absolute	12	2	0	0	2	96	6th
2023	24 Hours of Le Mans – LMGTE Am	Walkenhorst Motorsport	1	0	0	0	0	—N/a	8th
2024	Sepang 12 Hours	Absolute Racing						—N/a	
2024	GT World Challenge Asia	Absolute Corse	12	0	0	0	0	16	31st
2024	GT World Challenge Asia – Silver-Am	Absolute Corse	12	0	3	0	4	105	7th
2024	GT World Challenge Australia – Pro-Am	Volante Rosso Motorsport	0	0	0	0	0	0	NC
2025	GT World Challenge Asia	Absolute Corse	2	0	0	0	0	10	35th
2025	GT World Challenge Asia – Pro-Am	Absolute Corse	2	0	0	0	1	19	27th
2026	Bathurst 12 Hour – GT3 Pro-Am	Volante Rosso Motorsport	1	0	0	0	1	—N/a	**3rd**
2026	GT World Challenge Asia	Audi Sport Asia Team Phantom	11	1	1	0	3	66	12th
2026	GT World Challenge Asia – Pro-Am	Audi Sport Asia Team Phantom	11	2	1	0	3	109	6th

^{†} As Haryanto was a guest driver, he was ineligible to score points.

=== Complete GT World Challenge Asia results ===
(key) (Races in bold indicate pole position) (Races in italics indicate fastest lap)

Year	Team	Car	Class	1	2	3	4	5	6	7	8	9	10	11	12	DC	Points
2017	X-One Motorsports	Lamborghini Huracán GT3	GT3 Am	SEP; 1 DNS	SEP; 2 DNS	BUR; 1	BUR; 2	**SUZ**; **1**; 1	SUZ; 2; 1	**FUJ**; **1**; 1	FUJ; 2; 1	**SHA**; **1**; 1	SHA; 2; 3	**ZHE**; **1**; 2	**ZHE**; **2**; 3	2nd	173
2019	HubAuto Corsa	Ferrari 488 GT3	GT3 Am	SEP; 1; 4	SEP; 2; 3	CHA; 1	CHA; 2	SUZ; 1	SUZ; 2	FUJ; 1	FUJ; 2	KOR; 1	KOR; 2	SHA; 1	SHA; 2	7th	27
2023	Audi Sport Asia Team Absolute	Audi R8 LMS Evo II	GT3 Pro-Am	BUR; 1; 7	BUR; 2; 14	FUJ; 1; 9	FUJ; 2; 5	SUZ; 1; 4	SUZ; 2; 7	MOT; 1; 1	MOT; 2 Ret	OKA; 1; 5	OKA; 2; 18	SEP; 1; 1	SEP; 2; 11	6th	96
2024	Absolute Corse	Ferrari 296 GT3	Silver-Am	SEP; 1; 5	SEP; 2; 4	BUR; 1; 4	BUR; 2; 3	FUJ; 1; 8	FUJ; 2; 3	SUZ; 1; 2	**SUZ**; **2**; 9	OKA; 1; 3	**OKA**; **2**; 9	SHA; 1 Ret	**SHA**; **2** Ret	7th	105
2025	Absolute Corse	Lamborghini Huracán GT3 Evo 2	Pro-Am	SEP; 1	SEP; 2	MAN; 1; 8	MAN; 2; 3	BUR; 1	BUR; 2	FUJ; 1	FUJ; 2	OKA; 1	OKA; 2	BEI; 1	BEI; 2	27th	19
2026	Audi Sport Asia Team Phantom	Audi R8 LMS Evo II	Pro-Am	SEP; 1; 4	SEP; 2; 8	MAN; 1; 1	MAN; 2; 3	FUJ; 1 Ret	FUJ; 2; 7	OKA; 1; 5	**OKA**; **2**; 1	BEI; 1 Ret	BEI; 2; 8	SHA; 1; 6	SHA; 2 DNS	6th	109

=== Complete GT World Challenge Europe results ===
==== GT World Challenge Europe Endurance Cup ====
(Races in bold indicate pole position) (Races in italics indicate fastest lap)

Year	Team	Car	Class	1	2	3	4	5	6	7	Pos.	Points
2018	GDL Racing	Lamborghini Huracán LP 620-2 Super Trofeo	Group N	MON	SIL	LEC	SPA; 6H; 52	SPA; 12H; 52	SPA; 24H; 47	CAT	NC†	0†
2019	Audi Sport R8 LMS Cup	Audi R8 LMS Evo	Am	MNZ	SIL	LEC	SPA; 6H; 63	SPA; 12H; 58	SPA; 24H; 50	CAT	29th	1

=== Complete FIA World Endurance Championship results ===
(key) (Races in bold indicate pole position; races in italics indicate fastest lap)

Year	Entrant	Class	Chassis	Engine	1	2	3	4	5	6	Rank	Points
2021	Dempsey-Proton Racing	LMGTE Am	Porsche 911 RSR-19	Porsche 4.2 L Flat-6	SPA; 5	PRT	MNZ; 6	LMS	BHR	BHR	17th	18

=== Complete 24 Hours of Le Mans results ===
Year	Team	Co-Drivers	Car	Class	Laps	Pos.	Class Pos.
2021	(Germany) Absolute Racing	(Germany) Marco Seefried (Belgium) Alessio Picariello	Porsche 911 RSR-19	LMGTE Am	332	34th	7th
2022	(United States) Hardpoint Motorsport	(Belgium) Alessio Picariello (Estonia) Martin Rump	Porsche 911 RSR-19	LMGTE Am	338	44th	11th
2023	(Germany) Walkenhorst Motorsport	(United States) Jeff Segal (United States) Chandler Hull	Ferrari 488 GTE Evo	LMGTE Am	307	36th	8th

=== Complete European Le Mans Series results ===
(key) (Races in bold indicate pole position; results in italics indicate fastest lap)

Year	Entrant	Class	Chassis	Engine	1	2	3	4	5	6	Rank	Points
2022	Absolute Racing	LMGTE	Porsche 911 RSR-19	Porsche 4.2 L Flat-6	LEC; 8	IMO; Ret	MNZ; 4	CAT; 5	SPA; 3	ALG; 6	7th	49
