= 2018 Lamborghini Super Trofeo Asia =

International motor racing series

The 2018 Lamborghini Super Trofeo Asia was the seventh season of the Lamborghini Super Trofeo Asia. The season began on April 14 at Sepang International Circuit, and ended on November 18 with the World Final at the Vallelunga Circuit. The series served as part of the support package to the Blancpain GT Series Asia. This season also marked the debut of the new Lamborghini Huracán Super Trofeo EVO2.

The Pro class was won by the combination of Andrea Amici and Artur Janosz while Pro-Am honours went to the Finnish pairing of Mikko Eskelinen and Juuso Puhakka. The Lamborghini Cup was won by Hong Kong drivers Paul Wong and Clement Li while Suttiluck Buncharoen secured the Am class before the final round in Vallelunga.

== Calendar ==
The following circuits hosted at least one round of the 2018 championship.

Rnd.	Circuit	Date	Supporting
1	Sepang International Circuit, Selangor, Malaysia	14–15 April	Blancpain GT Series Asia; Formula 4 South East Asia Championship
2	Buriram International Circuit, Buriram Province, Thailand	12–13 May	Blancpain GT Series Asia
3	Suzuka Circuit, Suzuka, Japan	30 June–1 July	Blancpain GT Series Asia
4	Fuji Speedway, Shizuoka Prefecture, Japan	21–22 July	Blancpain GT Series Asia
5	Shanghai International Circuit, Shanghai, China	22–23 September	Blancpain GT Series Asia; F3 Asian Championship; F4 Chinese Championship
6	Vallelunga Circuit, Campagnano di Roma, Italy	15–16 November	Lamborghini Super Trofeo World Finals
WF	Vallelunga Circuit, Campagnano di Roma, Italy	17–18 November	Lamborghini Super Trofeo World Finals

== Teams and drivers ==
All teams used the Lamborghini Huracán Super Trofeo EVO2.

Team	No.	Drivers	Class	Rounds
(Germany) Leipert Motorsport	2	(Australia) Ben Gersekowski	P	All
(Germany) Leipert Motorsport	2	(Australia) Richard Muscat	P	1–2, 4–6
(Germany) Leipert Motorsport	2	(Denmark) Frederik Schandorff	P	3
(Germany) Leipert Motorsport	33	(Finland) Mikko Eskelinen	PA	All
(Germany) Leipert Motorsport	33	(Finland) Juuso Puhakka	PA	All
(Japan) Clazzio Racing	11	(Japan) Kei Cozzolino	P	3–6
(Japan) Clazzio Racing	11	(Malaysia) Afiq Yazid	P	3–6
(China) Top Speed Racing Team (Japan) D1 Racing Team	18	(Indonesia) Andrew Haryanto	Am	1
(China) Top Speed Racing Team (Japan) D1 Racing Team	27	(India) Armaan Ebrahim	P	2
(China) Top Speed Racing Team (Japan) D1 Racing Team	27	(India) Anindith Reddy	P	2
(China) Top Speed Racing Team (Japan) D1 Racing Team	69	(China) Hao Bian	Am	1–3
(China) Top Speed Racing Team (Japan) D1 Racing Team	69	(China) Huilin Han	Am	1–2
(China) Top Speed Racing Team (Japan) D1 Racing Team	69	(China) Ling Kang	Am	3
(China) Top Speed Racing Team (Japan) D1 Racing Team	69	(China) Sky Chen	Am	4
(China) Top Speed Racing Team (Japan) D1 Racing Team	69	(China) Pan Chao	Am	5
(China) FFF Racing Team by ACM	5	(China) Songyang Fu	LC	5
(China) FFF Racing Team by ACM	19	(United Kingdom) Jack Bartholomew	P	All
(China) FFF Racing Team by ACM	19	(United Kingdom) James Pull	P	All
(China) FFF Racing Team by ACM	63	(Italy) Andrea Amici	P	All
(China) FFF Racing Team by ACM	63	(Poland) Artur Janosz	P	All
(Japan) YH Racing Team	30	(Japan) Takamichi Matsuda	LC	2–6
(Japan) YH Racing Team	30	(Japan) Dai Yoshihara	LC	5–6
(Japan) Hojuat Racing	38	(Japan) Takeshi Matsumoto	PA	All
(Japan) Hojuat Racing	38	(Japan) Toshiyuki Ochiai	PA	All
(Hong Kong) 852 Challengers	44	(Hong Kong) Paul Wong	LC	All
(Hong Kong) 852 Challengers	44	(Hong Kong) Clement Li	LC	1–5
(Japan) FPC Racing	55	(Japan) Ken Urata	Am	1, 3–4
(Japan) FPC Racing	55	(Japan) Daisuke Matsunaga	Am	1, 3–4
(Thailand) PSC Motorsport	57	(Thailand) Sarun Sereethoranakul	Am	1
(Thailand) PSC Motorsport	57	(Thailand) Saravut Sereethoranakul	Am	1–2
(Thailand) True Visions Motorsport	59	(Thailand) Suttiluck Buncharoen	Am	2–5
(Chinese Taipei) Gama Racing	68	(Chinese Taipei) Evan Chen	PA	All
(Chinese Taipei) Gama Racing	68	(Japan) Akihiro Asai	PA	All
(San Marino) GDL Racing	88	(Italy) Gabriele Murroni	LC	All
(Malaysia) Aylezo Motorsport	98	(Malaysia) Kumar Prabakaran	PA	All
(Malaysia) Aylezo Motorsport	98	(Monaco) Cédric Sbirrazzuoli	PA	1–2
(Malaysia) Aylezo Motorsport	98	(Italy) Massimiliano Wiser	PA	3–6
(Japan) Car Guy Racing	99	(Japan) Satoshi Furuta	PA	4
(Japan) Car Guy Racing	99	(Japan) Jun Tashiro	PA	4

Icon	Class
P	Pro Cup
PA	Pro-Am Cup
Am	Am Cup
LC	Lamborghini Cup
	Guest Starter

== Race results ==
Round		Circuit	Pole Position	Pro Winners	Pro-Am Winners	Am Winners	LC Winners
1	R1	(Malaysia) Sepang	(China) No. 63 FFF Racing Team by ACM	(China) No. 63 FFF Racing Team by ACM	(Chinese Taipei) No. 68 Gama Racing	(Thailand) No. 57 PSC Motorsport	(Hong Kong) No. 44 852 Challengers
1	R1	(Malaysia) Sepang	(Italy) Andrea Amici (Poland) Artur Janosz	(Italy) Andrea Amici (Poland) Artur Janosz	(Chinese Taipei) Evan Chen (Japan) Akihiro Asai	(Thailand) Saravut Sereethoranakul (Thailand) Sarun Sereethoranakul	(Hong Kong) Paul Wong (Hong Kong) Clement Li
1	R2	(Malaysia) Sepang	(Germany) No. 2 Leipert Motorsport	(China) No. 63 FFF Racing Team by ACM	(Japan) No. 38 Hojuat Racing	(Thailand) No. 57 PSC Motorsport	(Hong Kong) No. 44 852 Challengers
1	R2	(Malaysia) Sepang	(Australia) Ben Gersekowski (Australia) Richard Muscat	(Italy) Andrea Amici (Poland) Artur Janosz	(Japan) Takeshi Matsumoto (Japan) Toshiyuki Ochiai	(Thailand) Saravut Sereethoranakul (Thailand) Sarun Sereethoranakul	(Hong Kong) Paul Wong (Hong Kong) Clement Li
2	R1	(Thailand) Buriram	(Germany) No. 2 Leipert Motorsport	(Germany) No. 2 Leipert Motorsport	(Germany) No. 33 Leipert Motorsport	(Thailand) No. 57 PSC Motorsport	(San Marino) No. 88 GDL Racing
2	R1	(Thailand) Buriram	(Australia) Ben Gersekowski (Australia) Richard Muscat	(Australia) Ben Gersekowski (Australia) Richard Muscat	(Finland) Mikko Eskelinen (Finland) Juuso Puhakka	(Thailand) Saravut Sereethoranakul	(Italy) Gabriele Murroni
2	R2	(Thailand) Buriram	(Germany) No. 2 Leipert Motorsport	(China) No. 63 FFF Racing Team by ACM	(Japan) No. 38 Hojuat Racing	No. 78 True Visions Motorsports Thailand	(Hong Kong) No. 44 852 Challengers
2	R2	(Thailand) Buriram	(Australia) Ben Gersekowski (Australia) Richard Muscat	(Italy) Andrea Amici (Poland) Artur Janosz	(Japan) Takeshi Matsumoto (Japan) Toshiyuki Ochiai	(Thailand) Suttiluck Buncharoen	(Hong Kong) Paul Wong (Hong Kong) Clement Li
3	R1	(Japan) Suzuka	(Japan) No. 38 Hojuat Racing	(Germany) No. 2 Leipert Motorsport	(Malaysia) No. 98 Aylezo Motorsport	(Japan) No. 55 FPC Racing	(San Marino) No. 88 GDL Racing
3	R1	(Japan) Suzuka	(Japan) Takeshi Matsumoto (Japan) Toshiyuki Ochiai	(Australia) Ben Gersekowski (Denmark) Frederik Schandorff	(Malaysia) Kumar Prabakaran (Italy) Massimiliano Wiser	(Japan) Ken Urata (Japan) Daisuke Matsunaga	(Italy) Gabriele Murroni
3	R2	(Japan) Suzuka	(Malaysia) No. 98 Aylezo Motorsport	(China) No. 63 FFF Racing Team by ACM	(Germany) No. 33 Leipert Motorsport	No. 78 True Visions Motorsports Thailand	(Hong Kong) No. 44 852 Challengers
3	R2	(Japan) Suzuka	(Malaysia) Kumar Prabakaran (Italy) Massimiliano Wiser	(Italy) Andrea Amici (Poland) Artur Janosz	(Finland) Mikko Eskelinen (Finland) Juuso Puhakka	(Thailand) Suttiluck Buncharoen	(Hong Kong) Paul Wong (Hong Kong) Clement Li
4	R1	(Japan) Fuji	(China) No. 63 FFF Racing Team by ACM	(Japan) No. 11 Clazzio Racing	(Germany) No. 33 Leipert Motorsport	No. 78 True Visions Motorsports Thailand	(Hong Kong) No. 44 852 Challengers
4	R1	(Japan) Fuji	(Italy) Andrea Amici (Poland) Artur Janosz	(Japan) Kei Cozzolino (Malaysia) Afiq Yazid	(Finland) Mikko Eskelinen (Finland) Juuso Puhakka	(Thailand) Suttiluck Buncharoen	(Hong Kong) Paul Wong (Hong Kong) Clement Li
4	R2	(Japan) Fuji	(Japan) No. 11 Clazzio Racing	(Japan) No. 11 Clazzio Racing	(Chinese Taipei) No. 68 Gama Racing	(Japan) No. 99 Car Guy Racing	(San Marino) No. 88 GDL Racing
4	R2	(Japan) Fuji	(Japan) Kei Cozzolino (Malaysia) Afiq Yazid	(Japan) Kei Cozzolino (Malaysia) Afiq Yazid	(Chinese Taipei) Evan Chen (Japan) Akihiro Asai	(Japan) Jun Tashiro (Japan) Satoshi Furuta	(Italy) Gabriele Murroni
5	R1	(China) Shanghai	(Japan) No. 11 Clazzio Racing	(Japan) No. 11 Clazzio Racing	(Germany) No. 33 Leipert Motorsport	(Japan) No. 69 D1 Racing Team	(Hong Kong) No. 44 852 Challengers
5	R1	(China) Shanghai	(Japan) Kei Cozzolino (Malaysia) Afiq Yazid	(Japan) Kei Cozzolino (Malaysia) Afiq Yazid	(Finland) Mikko Eskelinen (Finland) Juuso Puhakka	(China) Chao Pan (China) Hao Bian	(Hong Kong) Paul Wong (Hong Kong) Clement Li
5	R2	(China) Shanghai	(Japan) No. 11 Clazzio Racing	(China) No. 63 FFF Racing Team by ACM	(Japan) No. 38 Hojust Racing	No. 78 True Visions Motorsports Thailand	(Hong Kong) No. 44 852 Challengers
5	R2	(China) Shanghai	(Japan) Kei Cozzolino (Malaysia) Afiq Yazid	(Italy) Andrea Amici (Poland) Artur Janosz	(Japan) Takeshi Matsumoto (Japan) Toshiyuki Ochiai	(Thailand) Suttiluck Buncharoen	(Hong Kong) Paul Wong (Hong Kong) Clement Li
6	R1	(Italy) Vallelunga	(Japan) No. 11 Clazzio Racing	(Japan) No. 11 Clazzio Racing	(Germany) No. 33 Leipert Motorsport	no entrants	(Japan) No. 30 YH Racing Team
6	R1	(Italy) Vallelunga	(Japan) Kei Cozzolino (Malaysia) Afiq Yazid	(Japan) Kei Cozzolino (Malaysia) Afiq Yazid	(Finland) Mikko Eskelinen (Finland) Juuso Puhakka	no entrants	(Japan) Takamichi Matsuda (Japan) Dai Yoshihara
6	R2	(Italy) Vallelunga	(Japan) No. 11 Clazzio Racing	(Japan) No. 11 Clazzio Racing	(Japan) No. 38 Hojust Racing	no entrants	(San Marino) No. 88 GDL Racing
6	R2	(Italy) Vallelunga	(Japan) Kei Cozzolino (Malaysia) Afiq Yazid	(Japan) Kei Cozzolino (Malaysia) Afiq Yazid	(Japan) Takeshi Matsumoto (Japan) Toshiyuki Ochiai	no entrants	(Italy) Gabriele Murroni

== Championship standings ==
=== Scoring system ===
Position	1st	2nd	3rd	4th	5th	6th	7th	8th	9th	10th	Pole
Points	15	12	10	8	6	5	4	3	2	1	1

=== Pro ===
Pos.	Driver	Team	(Malaysia) SEP		(Thailand) BUR		(Japan) SUZ		(Japan) FUJ		(China) SHA		(Italy) VAL		Pts
Pos.	Driver	Team	R1	R2	R1	R2	R1	R2	R1	R2	R1	R2	R1	R2	Pts
1	(Italy) Andrea Amici (Poland) Artur Janosz	(China) FFF Racing Team by ACM	1	1	3	1	5	1	4	2	3	1	3	4	142
2	(United Kingdom) Jack Bartholomew (United Kingdom) James Pull	(China) FFF Racing Team by ACM	3	2	2	3	2	3	2	Ret	4	2	2	3	121
3	(Australia) Ben Gersekowski	(Germany) Leipert Motorsport	Ret	Ret	1	2	1	4	3	3	2	3	4	2	115
4	(Japan) Kei Cozzolino (Malaysia) Afiq Yazid	(Japan) Clazzio Racing					3	2	1	1	1	4	1	1	110
5	(Australia) Richard Muscat	(Germany) Leipert Motorsport	Ret	Ret	1	2			3	3	2	3	4	2	92
6	(India) Armaan Ebrahim (India) Anindith Reddy	(China) Top Speed Racing Team (Japan) D1 Racing Team	2	3			4	5							36
7	(Denmark) Frederik Schandorff	(Germany) Leipert Motorsport					1	4							23
Pos.	Driver	Team	R1	R2	R1	R2	R1	R2	R1	R2	R1	R2	R1	R2	Pts
Pos.	Driver	Team	(Malaysia) SEP		(Thailand) BUR		(Japan) SUZ		(Japan) FUJ		(China) SHA		(Italy) VAL		Pts

=== Pro-Am ===
Pos.	Driver	Team	(Malaysia) SEP		(Thailand) BUR		(Japan) SUZ		(Japan) FUJ		(China) SHA		(Italy) VAL		Pts
Pos.	Driver	Team	R1	R2	R1	R2	R1	R2	R1	R2	R1	R2	R1	R2	Pts
1	(Finland) Mikko Eskelinen (Finland) Juuso Puhakka	(Germany) Leipert Motorsport	3	2	1	Ret	2	1	1	2	1	3	1	3	146
2	(Chinese Taipei) Evan Chen (Japan) Akihiro Asai	(Chinese Taipei) Gama Racing	1	3	3	3	3	2	2	1	2	2	2	2	144
3	(Japan) Takeshi Matsumoto (Japan) Toshiyuki Ochiai	(Japan) Hojust Racing	2	1	4	1	Ret	4	DNS	3	3	1	3	1	122
4	(Malaysia) Kumar Prabakaran	(Malaysia) Aylezo Motorsport	4	4	5	4	1	Ret	3	4	4	4	4	4	96
5	(Italy) Massimiliano Wiser	(Malaysia) Aylezo Motorsport					1	Ret	3	4	4	4	4	4	66
6	(Monaco) Cédric Sbirrazzuoli	(Malaysia) Aylezo Motorsport	4	4	5	4									30
7	(India) Armaan Ebrahim (India) Anindith Reddy	(China) Top Speed Racing Team (Japan) D1 Racing Team			2	2									24
8	(China) Ling Kang (China) Hao Bian	(China) Top Speed Racing Team (Japan) D1 Racing Team					Ret	3							10
Pos.	Driver	Team	R1	R2	R1	R2	R1	R2	R1	R2	R1	R2	R1	R2	Pts
Pos.	Driver	Team	(Malaysia) SEP		(Thailand) BUR		(Japan) SUZ		(Japan) FUJ		(China) SHA		(Italy) VAL		Pts

=== Am ===
Pos.	Driver	Team	(Malaysia) SEP		(Thailand) BUR		(Japan) SUZ		(Japan) FUJ		(China) SHA		(Italy) VAL		Pts
Pos.	Driver	Team	R1	R2	R1	R2	R1	R2	R1	R2	R1	R2	R1	R2	Pts
1	(Thailand) Suttiluck Buncharoen	True Vision Motorsports Thailand			2	1	2	1	1	2	Ret	1			99
2	(Japan) Ken Urata (Japan) Daisuke Matsunaga	(Japan) FPC Racing	3	3			1	2	2	3					71
3	(China) Hao Bian	(China) Top Speed Racing Team (Japan) D1 Racing Team	4	4	3	Ret			Ret	Ret	1	2			53
4	(Thailand) Saravut Sereethoranakul	(Thailand) PSC Motorsport	1	1	1	Ret									48
5	(Thailand) Sarun Sereethoranakul	(Thailand) PSC Motorsport	1	1											31
6	(China) Chao Pan	(Japan) D1 Racing Team									1	2			27
7	(China) Huilin Han	(China) Top Speed Racing Team (Japan) D1 Racing Team	4	4	3	Ret									26
8	(Indonesia) Andrew Haryanto	(China) Top Speed Racing Team	2	2											24
9	(Japan) Jun Tashiro (Japan) Satoshi Furuta	(Japan) Car Guy Racing							Ret	1					17
10	(China) Sky Chen	(Japan) D1 Racing Team							Ret	Ret					0
Pos.	Driver	Team	R1	R2	R1	R2	R1	R2	R1	R2	R1	R2	R1	R2	Pts
Pos.	Driver	Team	(Malaysia) SEP		(Thailand) BUR		(Japan) SUZ		(Japan) FUJ		(China) SHA		(Italy) VAL		Pts

=== LC Cup ===
Pos.	Driver	Team	(Malaysia) SEP		(Thailand) BUR		(Japan) SUZ		(Japan) FUJ		(China) SHA		(Italy) VAL		Pts
Pos.	Driver	Team	R1	R2	R1	R2	R1	R2	R1	R2	R1	R2	R1	R2	Pts
1	(Hong Kong) Paul Wong (Hong Kong) Clement Li	(Hong Kong) 852 Challengers	1	1	3	1	Ret	1	1	3	1	1	3	3	130
2	(Italy) Gabriele Murroni	(San Marino) GDL Racing	2	2	1	Ret	1	2	Ret	1	2	2	2	1	108
3	(Japan) Takamichi Matsuda	(Japan) YH Racing Team			2	2	2	3	Ret	2	3	3	1	2	80
4	(Japan) Dai Yoshihara	(Japan) YH Racing Team									3	3	1	2	21
5	(China) Songyang Fu	(China) FFF Racing Team by ACM									4	Ret			8
Pos.	Driver	Team	R1	R2	R1	R2	R1	R2	R1	R2	R1	R2	R1	R2	Pts
Pos.	Driver	Team	(Malaysia) SEP		(Thailand) BUR		(Japan) SUZ		(Japan) FUJ		(China) SHA		(Italy) VAL		Pts
