= 2020 GT World Challenge Europe Sprint Cup =

The 2020 GT World Challenge Europe Sprint Cup was the eighth season of the GT World Challenge Europe Sprint Cup following on from the demise of the SRO Motorsports Group's FIA GT1 World Championship (an auto racing series for grand tourer cars), the first after title sponsor Blancpain withdrew sponsorship. The season began on 9 August at Misano World Circuit and finished on 11 October at the Circuit de Barcelona-Catalunya. This season the GT Sports Club Europe was brought into the GT World Challenge Europe, meaning the Bronze-focused GT3 and GT2 series shared grids with the headlining series.

== Calendar ==
The season began on 9 August at Misano and finished on 11 October at the Circuit de Barcelona-Catalunya.

Round	Circuit	Date
1	Misano World Circuit Marco Simoncelli, Misano Adriatico, Italy	9 August
2	Circuit de Nevers Magny-Cours, Magny-Cours, France	13 September
3	Circuit Zandvoort, Zandvoort, Netherlands	27 September
4	Circuit de Barcelona-Catalunya, Montmeló, Spain	11 October
Cancelled due to the 2019-20 coronavirus pandemic
	Сircuit	Original Date
	(United Kingdom) Brands Hatch, Kent, Great Britain	3 May
	Hungaroring, Mogyoród, Hungary	27 September
	Autodromo Enzo e Dino Ferrari, Imola, Italy	1 November (Note: now forms part of the 2020 GT World Challenge Europe Endurance Cup)

== Entry list ==
Team	Car	No.	Drivers	Class	Rounds
(Germany) Toksport WRT	Mercedes-AMG GT3 Evo	2	(Finland) Juuso Puhakka	S	All
(Germany) Toksport WRT	Mercedes-AMG GT3 Evo	2	(Colombia) Óscar Tunjo	S	All
(Germany) Toksport WRT	Mercedes-AMG GT3 Evo	6	(Poland) Robin Rogalski	S	1–3
(Germany) Toksport WRT	Mercedes-AMG GT3 Evo	6	(Germany) Kris Heidorn	S	1
(Germany) Toksport WRT	Mercedes-AMG GT3 Evo	6	(Austria) Mick Wishofer	S	2
(Germany) Toksport WRT	Mercedes-AMG GT3 Evo	6	(France) Romain Monti	S	3
(Germany) Haupt Racing Team	Mercedes-AMG GT3 Evo	4	(Germany) Maro Engel	P	1–2, 4
(Germany) Haupt Racing Team	Mercedes-AMG GT3 Evo	4	(Germany) Luca Stolz	P	1–2, 4
(Switzerland) Emil Frey Racing	Lamborghini Huracán GT3 Evo	14	(Austria) Norbert Siedler	P	1–3
(Switzerland) Emil Frey Racing	Lamborghini Huracán GT3 Evo	14	(Canada) Mikaël Grenier	P	1–3
(Switzerland) Emil Frey Racing	Lamborghini Huracán GT3 Evo	14	(Canada) Mikaël Grenier	S	4
(Switzerland) Emil Frey Racing	Lamborghini Huracán GT3 Evo	14	(Switzerland) Ricardo Feller	S	4
(Switzerland) Emil Frey Racing	Lamborghini Huracán GT3 Evo	163	(Italy) Giacomo Altoè	P	All
(Switzerland) Emil Frey Racing	Lamborghini Huracán GT3 Evo	163	(Spain) Albert Costa	P	All
(France) Tech 1 Racing	Lexus RC F GT3	15	(France) Thomas Neubauer	S	All
(France) Tech 1 Racing	Lexus RC F GT3	15	(France) Aurélien Panis	S	All
(United Kingdom) ERC Sport	Mercedes-AMG GT3 Evo	18	(United Kingdom) Phil Keen	PA	All
(United Kingdom) ERC Sport	Mercedes-AMG GT3 Evo	18	(United Kingdom) Lee Mowle	PA	All
(Germany) SPS Automotive Performance	Mercedes-AMG GT3 Evo	20	(Germany) Valentin Pierburg	PA	All
(Germany) SPS Automotive Performance	Mercedes-AMG GT3 Evo	20	(Austria) Dominik Baumann	PA	1–2, 4
(Germany) SPS Automotive Performance	Mercedes-AMG GT3 Evo	20	(Australia) Nick Foster	PA	3
(Germany) SPS Automotive Performance	Mercedes-AMG GT3 Evo	44	(Germany) Christian Hook	PA	1
(Germany) SPS Automotive Performance	Mercedes-AMG GT3 Evo	44	(United Kingdom) Tom Onslow-Cole	PA	1
(France) Saintéloc Racing	Audi R8 LMS Evo	25	(Germany) Christopher Haase	P	All
(France) Saintéloc Racing	Audi R8 LMS Evo	25	(France) Arthur Rougier	P	All
(France) Saintéloc Racing	Audi R8 LMS Evo	26	(France) Simon Gachet	S	All
(France) Saintéloc Racing	Audi R8 LMS Evo	26	(France) Steven Palette	S	All
(Belgium) Belgian Audi Club Team WRT	Audi R8 LMS Evo	30	(Netherlands) Rik Breukers	S	3
(Belgium) Belgian Audi Club Team WRT	Audi R8 LMS Evo	30	(Switzerland) Rolf Ineichen	S	3
(Belgium) Belgian Audi Club Team WRT	Audi R8 LMS Evo	31	(South Africa) Kelvin van der Linde	P	All
(Belgium) Belgian Audi Club Team WRT	Audi R8 LMS Evo	31	(Japan) Ryuichiro Tomita	P	All
(Belgium) Belgian Audi Club Team WRT	Audi R8 LMS Evo	32	(Belgium) Dries Vanthoor	P	All
(Belgium) Belgian Audi Club Team WRT	Audi R8 LMS Evo	32	(Belgium) Charles Weerts	P	All
(Belgium) Belgian Audi Club Team WRT	Audi R8 LMS Evo	33	(Germany) Hamza Owega	S	All
(Belgium) Belgian Audi Club Team WRT	Audi R8 LMS Evo	33	(Germany) Jusuf Owega	S	All
(Italy) AF Corse	Ferrari 488 GT3	52	(Italy) Andrea Bertolini	PA	All
(Italy) AF Corse	Ferrari 488 GT3	52	(Belgium) Louis Machiels	PA	All
(Germany) Attempto Racing	Audi R8 LMS Evo	55	(Italy) Mattia Drudi	P	All
(Germany) Attempto Racing	Audi R8 LMS Evo	55	(Italy) Tommaso Mosca	P	All
(Germany) Attempto Racing	Audi R8 LMS Evo	66	(Austria) Nicolas Schöll	P	All
(Germany) Attempto Racing	Audi R8 LMS Evo	66	(Belgium) Frédéric Vervisch	P	1–2, 4
(Germany) Attempto Racing	Audi R8 LMS Evo	66	(United Kingdom) Finlay Hutchison	P	3
(France) AKKA ASP Team	Mercedes-AMG GT3 Evo	88	(Russia) Timur Boguslavskiy	P	All
(France) AKKA ASP Team	Mercedes-AMG GT3 Evo	88	(Italy) Raffaele Marciello	P	1–2, 4
(France) AKKA ASP Team	Mercedes-AMG GT3 Evo	88	(Brazil) Felipe Fraga	P	3
(France) AKKA ASP Team	Mercedes-AMG GT3 Evo	89	(Chile) Benjamín Hites	S	All
(France) AKKA ASP Team	Mercedes-AMG GT3 Evo	89	(France) Jim Pla	S	All
(Spain) Madpanda Motorsport	Mercedes-AMG GT3 Evo	90	(Argentina) Ezequiel Pérez Companc	S	All
(Spain) Madpanda Motorsport	Mercedes-AMG GT3 Evo	90	(Zimbabwe) Axcil Jefferies	S	All
(United Kingdom) Sky - Tempesta Racing	Ferrari 488 GT3	92	(Italy) Giancarlo Fisichella	PA	2
(United Kingdom) Sky - Tempesta Racing	Ferrari 488 GT3	92	(Hong Kong) Jonathan Hui	PA	2
(United Kingdom) Sky - Tempesta Racing	Ferrari 488 GT3	93	(Italy) Eddie Cheever	PA	All
(United Kingdom) Sky - Tempesta Racing	Ferrari 488 GT3	93	(United Kingdom) Chris Froggatt	PA	All
(France) CMR	Bentley Continental GT3	107	(France) Jules Gounon	P	All
(France) CMR	Bentley Continental GT3	107	(France) Nelson Panciatici	P	All
(France) CMR	Bentley Continental GT3	108	(France) Hugo Chevalier	S	All
(France) CMR	Bentley Continental GT3	108	(France) Pierre-Alexandre Jean	S	All

Icon	Class
P	Pro Cup
S	Silver Cup
PA	Pro-Am Cup
SC	Sports Club

== Race results ==
Bold indicates the overall winner.

Round		Circuit	Pole position	Pro winners	Silver winners	Pro/Am winners	Sports club winners
1	R1	(Italy) Misano	(France) No. 15 Tech 1 Racing	**(Belgium) No. 32 Belgian Audi Club Team WRT**	(France) No. 26 Saintéloc Racing	(United Kingdom) No. 93 Sky - Tempesta Racing	No Entries
1	R1	(Italy) Misano	(France) Thomas Neubauer (France) Aurélien Panis	**(Belgium) Dries Vanthoor** **(Belgium) Charles Weerts**	(France) Simon Gachet (France) Steven Palette	(Italy) Eddie Cheever (United Kingdom) Chris Froggatt	No Entries
1	R2	(Italy) Misano	(France) No. 88 AKKA ASP Team	**(France) No. 88 AKKA ASP Team**	(France) No. 26 Saintéloc Racing	(Italy) No. 52 AF Corse	No Entries
1	R2	(Italy) Misano	(Russia) Timur Boguslavskiy (Italy) Raffaele Marciello	**(Russia) Timur Boguslavskiy** **(Italy) Raffaele Marciello**	(France) Simon Gachet (France) Steven Palette	(Italy) Andrea Bertolini (Belgium) Louis Machiels	No Entries
1	R3	(Italy) Misano	(France) No. 15 Tech 1 Racing	**(Belgium) No. 32 Belgian Audi Club Team WRT**	(Spain) No. 90 Madpanda Motorsport	(United Kingdom) No. 93 Sky - Tempesta Racing	No Entries
1	R3	(Italy) Misano	(France) Thomas Neubauer (France) Aurélien Panis	**(Belgium) Dries Vanthoor** **(Belgium) Charles Weerts**	(Argentina) Ezequiel Pérez Companc (Zimbabwe) Axcil Jefferies	(Italy) Eddie Cheever (United Kingdom) Chris Froggatt	No Entries
2	R1	(France) Magny-Cours	(Germany) No. 4 Haupt Racing Team	**(Germany) No. 4 Haupt Racing Team**	(Germany) No. 2 Toksport WRT	(United Kingdom) No. 92 Sky - Tempesta Racing	No Entries
2	R1	(France) Magny-Cours	(Germany) Maro Engel (Germany) Luca Stolz	**(Germany) Maro Engel** **(Germany) Luca Stolz**	(Finland) Juuso Puhakka (Colombia) Óscar Tunjo	(Italy) Giancarlo Fisichella (Hong Kong) Jonathan Hui	No Entries
2	R2	(France) Magny-Cours	(France) No. 26 Saintéloc Racing	(France) No. 88 AKKA ASP	**(France) No. 26 Saintéloc Racing**	(United Kingdom) No. 92 Sky - Tempesta Racing	No Entries
2	R2	(France) Magny-Cours	(France) Simon Gachet (France) Steven Palette	(Russia) Timur Boguslavskiy (Italy) Raffaele Marciello	**(France) Simon Gachet** **(France) Steven Palette**	(Italy) Giancarlo Fisichella (Hong Kong) Jonathan Hui	No Entries
3	R1	(Netherlands) Zandvoort	(Switzerland) No. 14 Emil Frey Racing	**(Belgium) No. 31 Belgian Audi Club Team WRT**	(France) No. 108 CMR	(United Kingdom) No. 93 Sky - Tempesta Racing	No Entries
3	R1	(Netherlands) Zandvoort	(Canada) Mikaël Grenier (Austria) Norbert Siedler	**(South Africa) Kelvin van der Linde** **(Japan) Ryuichiro Tomita**	(France) Hugo Chevalier (France) Pierre-Alexandre Jean	(Italy) Eddie Cheever (United Kingdom) Chris Froggatt	No Entries
3	R2	(Netherlands) Zandvoort	(Switzerland) No. 14 Emil Frey Racing	**(Switzerland) No. 163 Emil Frey Racing**	(France) No. 15 Tech 1 Racing	(United Kingdom) No. 93 Sky - Tempesta Racing	No Entries
3	R2	(Netherlands) Zandvoort	(Canada) Mikaël Grenier (Austria) Norbert Siedler	**(Italy) Giacomo Altoè** **(Spain) Albert Costa**	(France) Thomas Neubauer (France) Aurélien Panis	(Italy) Eddie Cheever (United Kingdom) Chris Froggatt	No Entries
4	R1	(Spain) Barcelona	(Switzerland) No. 14 Emil Frey Racing	**(Switzerland) No. 163 Emil Frey Racing**	(Switzerland) No. 14 Emil Frey Racing	(Italy) No. 52 AF Corse	No Entries
4	R1	(Spain) Barcelona	(Switzerland) Ricardo Feller (Canada) Mikaël Grenier	**(Italy) Giacomo Altoè** **(Spain) Albert Costa**	(Switzerland) Ricardo Feller (Canada) Mikaël Grenier	(Italy) Andrea Bertolini (Belgium) Louis Machiels	No Entries
4	R2	(Spain) Barcelona	(Switzerland) No. 163 Emil Frey Racing	**(Germany) No. 66 Attempto Racing**	(France) No. 89 AKKA ASP	(United Kingdom) No. 93 Sky - Tempesta Racing	No Entries
4	R2	(Spain) Barcelona	(Italy) Giacomo Altoè (Spain) Albert Costa	**(Austria) Nicolas Schöll** **(Belgium) Frédéric Vervisch**	(Chile) Benjamín Hites (France) Jim Pla	(Italy) Eddie Cheever (United Kingdom) Chris Froggatt	No Entries
4	R3	(Spain) Barcelona	(France) No. 88 AKKA ASP	**(France) No. 88 AKKA ASP**	(Switzerland) No. 14 Emil Frey Racing	(Italy) No. 52 AF Corse	No Entries
4	R3	(Spain) Barcelona	(Russia) Timur Boguslavskiy (Italy) Raffaele Marciello	**(Russia) Timur Boguslavskiy** **(Italy) Raffaele Marciello**	(Switzerland) Ricardo Feller (Canada) Mikaël Grenier	(Italy) Andrea Bertolini (Belgium) Louis Machiels	No Entries

== Championship standings ==
Scoring system

Championship points are awarded for the first ten positions in each race. The pole-sitter also receives one point and entries are required to complete 75% of the winning car's race distance in order to be classified and earn points. Individual drivers are required to participate for a minimum of 25 minutes in order to earn championship points in any race.

Position	1st	2nd	3rd	4th	5th	6th	7th	8th	9th	10th	Pole
Points	16.5	12	9.5	7.5	6	4.5	3	2	1	0.5	1

=== Drivers' championships ===
==== Overall ====
Pos.	Drivers	Team	MIS (Italy)			MAG (France)		ZAN (Netherlands)		BAR (Spain)			Points
1	(Belgium) Dries Vanthoor (Belgium) Charles Weerts	(Belgium) Belgian Audi Club Team WRT	1	4	1^{F}	3	4	12	7	6	2	2	89
2	(Russia) Timur Boguslavskiy	(France) AKKA ASP Team	8	1^{PF}	6	7	2	11	3	3	3	1^{P}	85
3	(Italy) Raffaele Marciello	(France) AKKA ASP Team	8	1^{PF}	6	7	2			3	3	1^{P}	75.5
4	(South Africa) Kelvin van der Linde (Japan) Ryuichiro Tomita	(Belgium) Belgian Audi Club Team WRT	2^{F}	5	7	5	6	1	11	7	4	4	66
5	(Spain) Albert Costa (Italy) Giacomo Altoè	(Switzerland) Emil Frey Racing	7	5	8	Ret	12	4	1	1	16^{PF}	5	60.5
6	(Germany) Maro Engel (Germany) Luca Stolz	(Germany) Haupt Racing Team	4	2	4	1^{PF}	3			5	17	Ret	60
7	(Germany) Christopher Haase (France) Arthur Rougier	(France) Saintéloc Racing	5	3	2	9	5	Ret	2	14	5	Ret	52.5
8	(Canada) Mikaël Grenier	(Switzerland) Emil Frey Racing	10	Ret	7	2	7^{F}	16^{P}	10^{P}	2^{PF}	8	3^{F}	45.5
9	(France) Simon Gachet (France) Steven Palette	(France) Saintéloc Racing	9	9	14	13	1^{P}	3	Ret	10	9	7	33.5
10	(Austria) Nicolas Schöll	(Germany) Attempto Racing	6	17	16	4	Ret	17	14	8	1	16	30.5
10	(Belgium) Frédéric Vervisch	(Germany) Attempto Racing	6	17	16	4	Ret			8	1	16	30.5
11	(Italy) Mattia Drudi (Italy) Tommaso Mosca	(Germany) Attempto Racing	15	6	3	6	Ret	8	Ret	11	Ret	6	25
12	(Switzerland) Ricardo Feller	(Switzerland) Emil Frey Racing								2^{PF}	8	3^{F}	24.5
13	(France) Jules Gounon (France) Nelson Panciatici	(France) CMR	3	8	18	Ret	10	5^{F}	6	21	DNS	DNS	22.5
14	(Austria) Norbert Siedler	(Switzerland) Emil Frey Racing	10	Ret	7	2	7^{F}	16^{P}	10^{P}				21
15	(France) Hugo Chevalier (France) Pierre-Alexandre Jean	(France) CMR	Ret	11	15	14	Ret	2	8	13	10	10	15
16	(France) Thomas Neubauer (France) Aurélien Panis	(France) Tech 1 Racing	Ret^{P}	15	19^{P}	Ret	18	7	4^{F}	12	19	8	14.5
17	(Chile) Benjamín Hites (France) Jim Pla	(France) AKKA ASP Team	19	Ret	DNS	12	20	18	9	4	6	9	14
18	(Colombia) Oscar Tunjo (Finland) Juuso Puhakka	(Germany) Toksport WRT	WD	WD	WD	8	8	13	5	9	7	Ret	14
19	(Brazil) Felipe Fraga	(France) AKKA ASP Team						11	3				9.5
20	(Zimbabwe) Axcil Jefferies (Argentina) Ezequiel Pérez Companc	(Spain) Madpanda Motorsport	16	12	9	17	11	6	15	18	11	13	5.5
21	(Germany) Hamza Owega (Germany) Jusuf Owega	(Belgium) Belgian Audi Club Team WRT	18	10	10	10	9	15	Ret	15	12	11	2.5
22	(Italy) Eddie Cheever (United Kingdom) Chris Froggatt	(United Kingdom) Sky - Tempesta Racing	11	14	11	15	14	9	12	20	13	Ret	1
23	(United Kingdom) Phil Keen (United Kingdom) Lee Mowle	(United Kingdom) ERC Sport	17	19	17	Ret	19	10	19	17	18	15	0.5
	(Italy) Giancarlo Fisichella (Hong Kong) Jonathan Hui	(United Kingdom) Sky - Tempesta Racing				11	13						0
	(Germany) Valentin Pierburg	(Germany) SPS Automotive Performance	12	16	12	16	17	14	18	19	14	14	0
	(Austria) Dominik Baumann	(Germany) SPS Automotive Performance	12	16	12	16	17			19	14	14	0
	(Italy) Andrea Bertolini (Belgium) Louis Machiels	(Italy) AF Corse	13	13	13	18	15	16	13	16	15	12	0
	(United Kingdom) Finlay Hutchison	(Germany) Attempto Racing						17	14				0
	(Germany) Christian Hook (United Kingdom) Tom Onslow-Cole	(Germany) SPS Automotive Performance	14	18	DNS								0
	(Australia) Nick Foster	(Germany) SPS Automotive Performance						14	18				0
	(Poland) Robin Rogalski	(Germany) Toksport WRT	Ret	WD	WD	Ret	16	20	16				0
	(France) Romain Monti	(Germany) Toksport WRT						20	16				0
	(Austria) Mick Wishofer	(Germany) Toksport WRT				Ret	16						0
	(Netherlands) Rik Breukers (Switzerland) Rolf Ineichen	(Belgium) Belgian Audi Club Team WRT						21	17				0
	(Germany) Kris Heidorn	(Germany) Toksport WRT	Ret	WD	WD								0
Pos.	Drivers	Team	MIS (Italy)			MAG (France)		ZAN (Netherlands)		BAR (Spain)			Points

Key
Colour	Result
Gold	Race winner
Silver	2nd place
Bronze	3rd place
Green	Points finish
Blue	Non-points finish
Blue	Non-classified finish (NC)
Purple	Did not finish (Ret)
Black	Disqualified (DSQ)
Black	Excluded (EX)
White	Did not start (DNS)
White	Race cancelled (C)
White	Withdrew (WD)
Blank	Did not participate

P – Pole
F – Fastest Lap

==== Silver Cup ====
Pos.	Drivers	Team	MIS (Italy)			MAG (France)		ZAN (Netherlands)		BAR (Spain)			Points
1	(France) Simon Gachet (France) Steven Palette	(France) Saintéloc Racing	9	9^{P}	14^{F}	13^{P}	1^{PF}	3	Ret	10	9	7	108.5
2	(Zimbabwe) Axcil Jefferies (Argentina) Ezequiel Pérez Companc	(Spain) Madpanda Motorsport	16	12	9	17^{F}	11	6	15	18	11	13^{P}	72.5
3	(Germany) Hamza Owega (Germany) Jusuf Owega	(Belgium) Belgian Audi Club Team WRT	18	10	10	10	9	15	Ret	15	12	11	70
4	(Colombia) Oscar Tunjo (Finland) Juuso Puhakka	(Germany) Toksport WRT	WD	WD	WD	8	8	13	5	9	7^{P}	Ret	69
5	(Chile) Benjamín Hites (France) Jim Pla	(France) AKKA ASP Team	19	Ret	DNS	12	20	18^{P}	9	4	6	9	66.5
6	(France) Hugo Chevalier (France) Pierre-Alexandre Jean	(France) CMR	Ret	11	15	14	Ret	2	8	13	10	10	65.5
7	(France) Thomas Neubauer (France) Aurélien Panis	(France) Tech 1 Racing	Ret^{PF}	15^{F}	19^{P}	Ret	18	7^{F}	4^{F}	12	19	8	60
8	(Switzerland) Ricardo Feller (Canada) Mikaël Grenier	(Switzerland) Emil Frey Racing								2^{PF}	8^{F}	3^{F}	43.5
9	(Poland) Robin Rogalski	(Germany) Toksport WRT	Ret	WD	WD	Ret	16	20	16				10
10	(United Kingdom) Finlay Hutchison (Austria) Nicolas Schöll	(Germany) Attempto Racing						17	14				9
11	(Austria) Mick Wishofer	(Germany) Toksport WRT				Ret	16						6
12	(France) Romain Monti	(Germany) Toksport WRT						20	16				4
13	(Netherlands) Rik Breukers (Switzerland) Rolf Ineichen	(Belgium) Belgian Audi Club Team WRT						21	17^{P}				3.5
	(Germany) Kris Heidorn	(Germany) Toksport WRT	Ret	WD	WD								0
Pos.	Drivers	Team	MIS (Italy)			MAG (France)		ZAN (Netherlands)		BAR (Spain)			Points

==== Pro-Am Cup ====
Pos.	Drivers	Team	MIS (Italy)			MAG (France)		ZAN (Netherlands)		BAR (Spain)			Points
1	(Italy) Eddie Cheever (United Kingdom) Chris Froggatt	(United Kingdom) Sky - Tempesta Racing	11	14^{PF}	11	15^{P}	14	9	12	20^{P}	13^{PF}	Ret^{P}	131
2	(Italy) Andrea Bertolini (Belgium) Louis Machiels	(Italy) AF Corse	13^{P}	13	13^{P}	18	15	16^{P}	13	16	15	12	117.5
3	(Germany) Valentin Pierburg	(Germany) SPS Automotive Performance	12^{F}	16	12^{F}	16	17	14	18^{PF}	19^{F}	14	14^{F}	104
4	(Austria) Dominik Baumann	(Germany) SPS Automotive Performance	12^{F}	16	12^{F}	16	17			19^{F}	14	14^{F}	84
5	(United Kingdom) Phil Keen (United Kingdom) Lee Mowle	(United Kingdom) ERC Sport	17	19	17	Ret	19	10^{F}	19	17	18	15	74
6	(Italy) Giancarlo Fisichella (Hong Kong) Jonathan Hui	(United Kingdom) Sky - Tempesta Racing				11^{F}	13^{PF}						34
7	(Australia) Nick Foster	(Germany) SPS Automotive Performance						14	18^{PF}				20
8	(Germany) Christian Hook (United Kingdom) Tom Onslow-Cole	(Germany) SPS Automotive Performance	14	18	DNS								15
Pos.	Drivers	Team	MIS (Italy)			MAG (France)		ZAN (Netherlands)		BAR (Spain)			Points

=== Team's championships ===
==== Overall ====
Pos.	Team	Manufacturer	MIS (Italy)			MAG (France)		ZAN (Netherlands)		BAR (Spain)			Points
1	(Belgium) Belgian Audi Club Team WRT	Audi	1^{F}	4	1^{F}	3	4	1	7	6	2	2	108.5
2	(France) AKKA ASP	Mercedes-AMG	8	1^{PF}	6	7	2	11	3	3	3	1^{P}	93.5
3	(Switzerland) Emil Frey Racing	Lamborghini	7	5	7	2	7^{F}	4^{P}	1^{P}	1^{PF}	8^{PF}	3^{F}	91.5
4	(France) Saintéloc Racing	Audi	5	3	2	9	1^{P}	3	2	10	5	7	87.5
5	(Germany) Haupt Racing Team	Mercedes-AMG	4	2	4	1^{PF}	3			5	17	Ret	65.5
6	(Germany) Attempto Racing	Audi	6	6	3	4	Ret	8	14	8	1	6	61
7	(France) CMR	Bentley	3	8	15	14	10	2^{F}	6	13	10	10	42.5
8	(Germany) Toksport WRT	Mercedes-AMG	Ret	WD	WD	8	8	13	5	9	7	Ret	25.5
9	(France) Tech 1 Racing	Lexus	Ret^{P}	15	19^{P}	Ret	18	7	4^{F}	12	19	8	20.5
10	(Spain) Madpanda Motorsport	Mercedes-AMG	16	12	9	17	11	6	15	18	11	13	16
11	(United Kingdom) Sky - Tempesta Racing	Ferrari	11	14	11	11	13	9	12	20	13	Ret	12.5
12	(Italy) AF Corse	Ferrari	13	13	13	18	15	16	13	16	15	12	6
13	(Germany) SPS Automotive Performance	Mercedes-AMG	12	16	12	16	17	14	18	19	14	14	3.5
14	(United Kingdom) ERC Sport	Mercedes-AMG	17	19	17	Ret	19	10	19	17	18	15	1
Pos.	Team	Manufacturer	MIS (Italy)			MAG (France)		ZAN (Netherlands)		BAR (Spain)			Points

==== Silver Cup ====
Pos.	Team	Manufacturer	MIS (Italy)			MAG (France)		ZAN (Netherlands)		BAR (Spain)			Points
1	(France) Saintéloc Racing	Audi	9	9^{P}	14^{F}	13^{P}	1^{PF}	3	Ret	10	9	7	108.5
2	(Belgium) Belgian Audi Club Team WRT	Audi	18	10	10	10	9	15	17^{P}	15	12	11	74
3	(Spain) Madpanda Motorsport	Mercedes-AMG	16	12	9	17^{F}	11	6	15	18	11	13^{P}	72.5
4	(Germany) Toksport WRT	Mercedes-AMG	Ret	WD	WD	8	8	13	5	9	7^{P}	Ret	69
5	(France) AKKA ASP	Mercedes-AMG	19	Ret	DNS	12	20	18^{P}	9	4	6	9	68
6	(France) CMR	Bentley	Ret	11	15	14	Ret	2	8	13	10	10	66.5
7	(France) Tech 1 Racing	Lexus	Ret^{PF}	15^{F}	19^{P}	Ret	18	7^{F}	4^{F}	12	19	8	62.5
8	(Switzerland) Emil Frey Racing	Lamborghini								2^{PF}	8^{F}	3^{F}	43.5
9	(Germany) Attempto Racing	Audi						17	14				9
Pos.	Team	Manufacturer	MIS (Italy)			MAG (France)		ZAN (Netherlands)		BAR (Spain)			Points

==== Pro-Am Cup ====
Pos.	Team	Manufacturer	MIS (Italy)			MAG (France)		ZAN (Netherlands)		BAR (Spain)			Points
1	(United Kingdom) Sky - Tempesta Racing	Ferrari	11	14^{PF}	11	11^{PF}	13^{PF}	9	12	20^{P}	13^{PF}	Ret^{P}	141
2	(Italy) AF Corse	Ferrari	13^{P}	13	13^{P}	18	15	16^{P}	13	16	15	12	122
3	(Germany) SPS Automotive Performance	Mercedes-AMG	12^{F}	16	12^{F}	16	17	14	18^{PF}	19^{F}	14	14^{F}	108.5
4	(United Kingdom) ERC Sport	Mercedes-AMG	17	19	17	Ret	19	10^{F}	19	17	18	15	78.5
Pos.	Team	Manufacturer	MIS (Italy)			MAG (France)		ZAN (Netherlands)		BAR (Spain)			Points

== See also ==
- 2020 GT World Challenge Europe
- 2020 GT World Challenge Europe Endurance Cup
- 2020 GT World Challenge Asia
- 2020 GT World Challenge America
