= 2025 IndyCar Series =

American auto racing season

2025 IndyCar season
- NTT IndyCar Series

Season
- Races: 17
- Start date: March 2
- End date: August 31

Awards
- Drivers' champion: (Spain) Álex Palou
- Manufacturers' Cup: (Japan) Honda
- Rookie of the Year: (United Kingdom) Louis Foster
- Indianapolis 500 winner: (Spain) Álex Palou

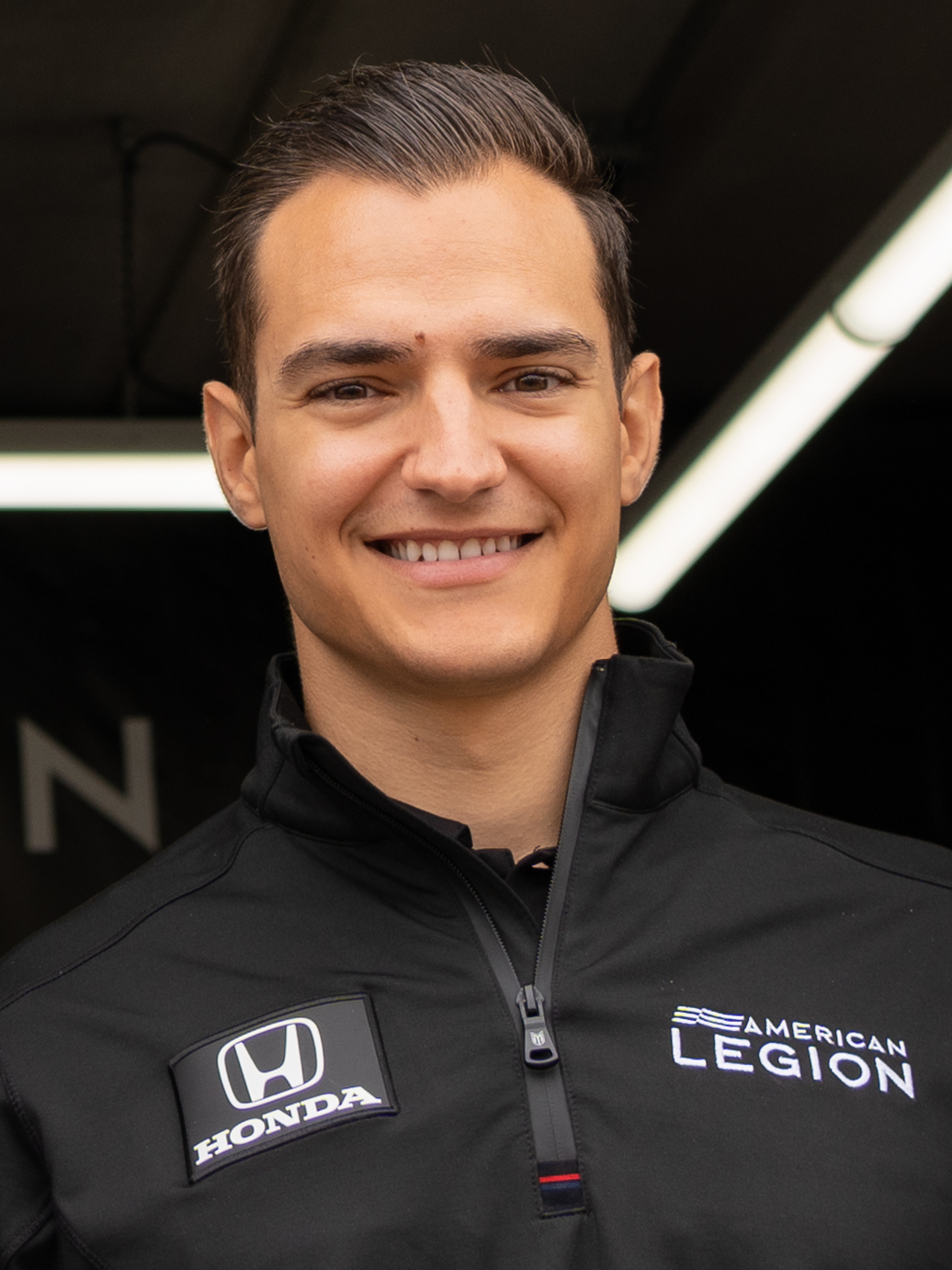
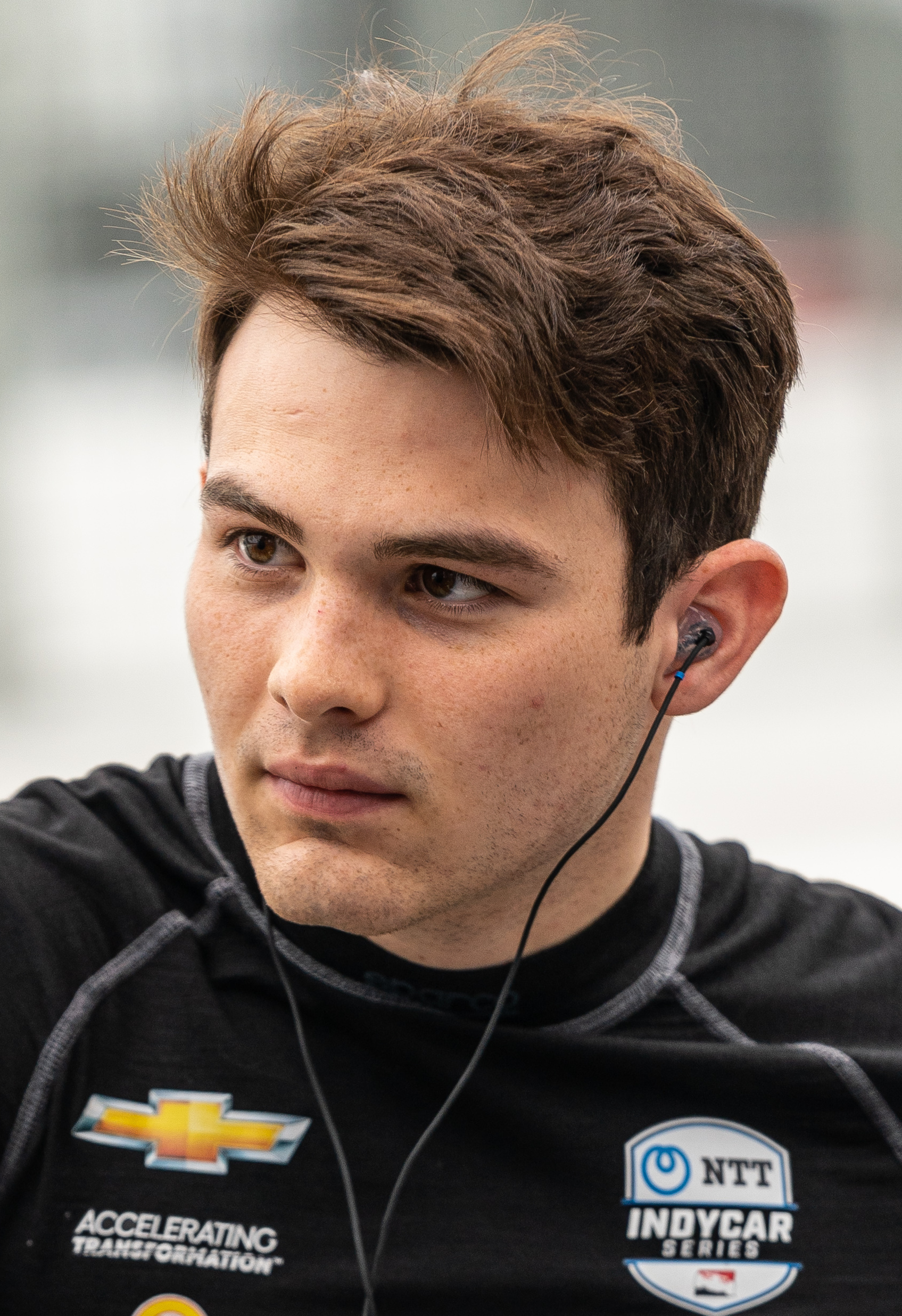
Defending series champion Álex Palou (left) won his fourth championship; Pato O'Ward (right) finished second.

The 2025 NTT IndyCar Series was the 114th official championship season of American open-wheel racing and the 30th season under IndyCar Series sanction. Its showcase event was the 109th running of the Indianapolis 500, which was won by Chip Ganassi Racing driver Álex Palou for the first time. Palou also entered the season as the back-to-back defending champion and earned a three-peat. He became the first driver to win the Indianapolis 500 and season driver's title in the same year since Dario Franchitti in 2010.

== Background and series news ==
After IndyCar's television contract with NBC Sports lapsed in 2024, the series signed a new agreement with Fox Sports that saw all races being covered on the Fox broadcast network. On January 14, 2025, Fox announced its broadcast team for the 2025 season. Will Buxton was named the lead commentator, who previously covered Formula One, while Townsend Bell and James Hinchcliffe, who previously served as analysts for NBC and are also former IndyCar drivers, retained their roles in the new lineup.

On September 12, 2024, IndyCar announced that the Firestone Tire and Rubber Company had signed an extension to remain as the series' sole tire supplier.

On September 23, 2024, IndyCar announced its first ever charter system, which began in 2025 and will extend until 2031. 25 charters were awarded among all teams that competed full-time in the 2024 season, with a maximum of 3 for each team. Chartered entries were qualified to compete for the 22 Leaders Circle contracts. At every race on the calendar outside of the Indianapolis 500, starting fields were limited to 27 cars, and chartered entries were guaranteed a starting position. Qualification for the Indianapolis 500 remained open, and no teams had a guaranteed entry in the 33-car starting field. (Note: The Leaders Circle program provides approximately $1 million to the top-22 eligible entries by entrant points at the end of a season, in what has been described by sources as a "socialized financial incentive program".)

As a new entrant in the series, PREMA Racing was excluded from receiving charters. If a race event outside of the Indianapolis 500 were to feature additional cars, those would have had to compete against the two PREMA cars for the two 'open' spots in the field.

On February 11, Doug Boles was named as the new president of IndyCar, replacing Jay Frye. Boles also continued to hold his role as president of Indianapolis Motor Speedway.

Numerous technical violations found during qualifying and the race for the Indianapolis 500, particularly involving the cars of Team Penske, led to the start of an overhaul of IndyCar's officiating system. The series announced after the race that they would create an independent officiating board for race stewarding and technical inspections, in part due to increasing concerns with Roger Penske owning both the IndyCar series and a competing team in the series. The new officiating board was targeted to be ready for the 2026 season. Further, the series announced their intent to begin using a scanning system during inspections to assist with finding possible rules infractions on cars. The new scanning process was rolled out at Portland, where four cars were impounded after the race and scanned to check for technical compliance.

On July 31, 2025, Fox Sports parent company Fox Corporation announced that it had acquired a one-third stake in IndyCar parent company Penske Entertainment. As part of the acquisition, Fox Sports' TV contract was extended to 2030.

== Confirmed entries ==
The following teams, entries, and drivers were contracted to compete in the 2025 NTT IndyCar Series season. All teams used a spec Dallara DW12 chassis with 2018 universal aero kit and Firestone tires.

Team	Engine	No.	Driver(s)	Round(s)	Ref(s)
A. J. Foyt Enterprises (Note: Technical partnership with Team Penske.)	Chevrolet	4	(United States) David Malukas	All	
A. J. Foyt Enterprises	Chevrolet	14	(United States) Santino Ferrucci	All	
Andretti Global	Honda	26	(United States) Colton Herta	All	
Andretti Global	Honda	27	(United States) Kyle Kirkwood	All	
Andretti Global	Honda	28	(Sweden) Marcus Ericsson	All	
Andretti Global	Honda	98	(United States) Marco Andretti	6	
Arrow McLaren	Chevrolet	5	(Mexico) Pato O'Ward	All	
Arrow McLaren	Chevrolet	6	(United States) Nolan Siegel	All	
Arrow McLaren	Chevrolet	7	(Denmark) Christian Lundgaard	All	
Arrow McLaren/Rick Hendrick	Chevrolet	17	(United States) Kyle Larson R (Note: Larson is considered a Rookie in the IndyCar Series as he has competed in less than eight IndyCar series races; however, he is not a rookie for the 2025 Indianapolis 500 as he participated in the 2024 Indianapolis 500.)	6	
Chip Ganassi Racing	Honda	8	(Cayman Islands) Kyffin Simpson	All	
Chip Ganassi Racing	Honda	9	(New Zealand) Scott Dixon	All	
Chip Ganassi Racing	Honda	10	(Spain) Álex Palou	All	
Dale Coyne Racing	Honda	18	(Netherlands) Rinus VeeKay	All	
Dale Coyne Racing	Honda	50	(United States) Jacob Abel R	16	
Dale Coyne Racing	Honda	51	(United States) Jacob Abel R	1–15, 17	
Dreyer & Reinbold Racing; Cusick Motorsports	Chevrolet	23	(United States) Ryan Hunter-Reay	6	
Dreyer & Reinbold Racing; Cusick Motorsports	Chevrolet	24	(United Kingdom) Jack Harvey	6	
Ed Carpenter Racing	Chevrolet	20	(United States) Alexander Rossi	All	
Ed Carpenter Racing	Chevrolet	21	(Denmark) Christian Rasmussen	All	
Ed Carpenter Racing	Chevrolet	33	(United States) Ed Carpenter	6	
Juncos Hollinger Racing	Chevrolet	76	(United States) Conor Daly	All	
Juncos Hollinger Racing	Chevrolet	77	(United States) Sting Ray Robb	All	
Meyer Shank Racing (Note: Technical partnership with Chip Ganassi Racing.) with Curb-Agajanian	Honda	06	(Brazil) Hélio Castroneves	6	
Meyer Shank Racing with Curb-Agajanian	Honda	60	(Sweden) Felix Rosenqvist	All	
Meyer Shank Racing with Curb-Agajanian	Honda	66	(New Zealand) Marcus Armstrong	All	
PREMA Racing	Chevrolet	83	(Israel) Robert Shwartzman R	All	
PREMA Racing	Chevrolet	90	(United Kingdom) Callum Ilott	All	
Rahal Letterman Lanigan Racing	Honda	15	(United States) Graham Rahal	All	
Rahal Letterman Lanigan Racing	Honda	30	(Canada) Devlin DeFrancesco	All	
Rahal Letterman Lanigan Racing	Honda	45	(United Kingdom) Louis Foster RY	All	
Rahal Letterman Lanigan Racing	Honda	75	(Japan) Takuma Sato	6	
Team Penske	Chevrolet	2	(United States) Josef Newgarden	All	
Team Penske	Chevrolet	3	(New Zealand) Scott McLaughlin	All	
Team Penske	Chevrolet	12	(Australia) Will Power	All	

Icon	Status
R	Eligible for Rookie of the Year
RY	Rookie of the Year

=== Driver changes ===
==== Preseason ====
- On July 2, 2024, Arrow McLaren announced that Christian Lundgaard would replace a departing Alexander Rossi, after Rossi and the team were unable to agree on a new contract.
- On August 13, 2024, A.J. Foyt Enterprises confirmed it had signed David Malukas full-time on a multi-year deal. Malukas departs Meyer Shank Racing after running the final 10 races of 2024 with them.
- On September 17, 2024, PREMA Racing confirmed reports that Callum Ilott would join full-time in the No. 90 entry for the 2025 season. Ilott moves from Jota Sport in the World Endurance Championship and also competed in two IndyCar races in 2024 as an injury substitute for Arrow McLaren.
- On September 19, 2024, Meyer Shank Racing confirmed that it had signed Marcus Armstrong for the 2025 season, replacing David Malukas in the No. 66 entry. Armstrong departs Chip Ganassi Racing after two seasons.
- On September 20, 2024, Racer reported that Ed Carpenter Racing informed Rinus VeeKay that it would end their relationship after five seasons. On September 23, VeeKay confirmed this report via social media.
- On September 25, 2024, Ed Carpenter Racing confirmed its driver line-up, with Alexander Rossi joining the team on a multi-year deal in the No. 20 entry, Christian Rasmussen moving from the No. 20 to the No. 21 entry full-time on a multi-year deal, and owner/driver Ed Carpenter returning to an Indy 500-only role in a third entry.
- On October 9, 2024, Rahal Letterman Lanigan Racing announced the signing of 2024 Indy NXT Champion Louis Foster to a multi-year deal, in the No. 45 entry, replacing Lundgaard.
- On October 30, 2024, Chip Ganassi Racing confirmed reports that Kyffin Simpson would move from the No. 4 entry to the No. 8, taking the place of a departing Linus Lundqvist.
- On November 5, 2024, PREMA Racing confirmed reports that it had signed Robert Shwartzman to fill its second race seat for the 2025 season. Shwartzman moves from AF Corse in the FIA World Endurance championship.
- On November 20, 2024, Juncos Hollinger Racing announced the signing of Sting Ray Robb to one of its entries for the 2025 season. He was later confirmed to be assigned to the No. 77 entry.
- On December 4, 2024, Dreyer & Reinbold Racing-Cusick Motorsports confirmed its Indy 500 lineup, with Jack Harvey joining the team in the No. 24 car at the Indianapolis 500.
- On December 9, Rahal Letterman Lanigan Racing confirmed Devlin DeFrancesco to drive its third entry, replacing Pietro Fittipaldi after one season.
- On December 18, 2024, Juncos Hollinger Racing confirmed that Conor Daly would drive the No. 78 entry full-time in 2025, after driving it part-time in 2024, and replacing a departing Romain Grosjean. On February 28, 2025, the car appeared with No. 76 instead, using the number representing a brand, and the respective font, of sponsor 76. Daly said a sponsorship announcement was expected for Thermal.
- On January 13, 2025, Dale Coyne announced that Jacob Abel would drive the No. 51 entry full-time, moving from Indy NXT.
- On February 14, 2025, Dale Coyne announced Rinus VeeKay would drive the No. 18 entry full time.
- On March 11, Rahal Letterman Lanigan Racing announced that Takuma Sato would return to the team as an Indianapolis 500 only entry for the second year in a row.

=== Team changes ===
==== Preseason ====
- On April 9, 2024, Italian junior formula and endurance racing team PREMA Racing announced it would enter two full-time entries in IndyCar in 2025, having secured a supply of Chevrolet engines.
- On August 19, 2024, Meyer Shank Racing confirmed that it would be switching technical alliance partners from Andretti Global to Chip Ganassi Racing, having been with Andretti since 2020.
- On September 4, 2024, Racer reported that Chip Ganassi Racing would downsize its IndyCar operation from five to three cars.
- On January 3, 2025, Arrow McLaren announced that McLaren Group had purchased the remaining 25% stake of the team from Sam Schmidt and Ric Peterson as of December 31, 2024.
- On January 13, 2025, with the confirmation of Jacob Abel to the No. 51 entry, Dale Coyne's partnership with Rick Ware Racing has ended, reverting the Dale Coyne Racing with Rick Ware Racing entry name back to Dale Coyne Racing.
- On March 20, 2025, Abel Motorsports announced that they would not enter the Indianapolis 500 as they did in 2024, opting to instead keep their chassis available as a backup for the Dale Coyne Racing entry of Jacob Abel, the son of team owner Bill Abel.

==== Mid-season ====
- On April 1, 2025, it was announced that Rahal Letterman Lanigan Racing appointed former IndyCar president Jay Frye as a team president.
- On May 21, 2025, following failed technical inspections of the cars driven by Josef Newgarden and Will Power during qualifying for the Indianapolis 500, Team Penske announced that president Tim Cindric, managing director Ron Ruzewski, and general manager Kyle Moyer had all been dismissed by the team.

== Schedule ==
The schedule was released on June 13, 2024.

Icon	Legend
O	Oval/Speedway
R	Road course
S	Street circuit

Rd.	Date	Race name	Track	Location
1	March 2	Firestone Grand Prix of St. Petersburg	S Streets of St. Petersburg	St. Petersburg, Florida
2	March 23	The Thermal Club IndyCar Grand Prix	R Thermal Club	Thermal, California
3	April 13	Acura Grand Prix of Long Beach	S Streets of Long Beach	Long Beach, California
4	May 4	Children's of Alabama Indy Grand Prix	R Barber Motorsports Park	Birmingham, Alabama
5	May 10	Sonsio Grand Prix	R Indianapolis Motor Speedway Road Course	Speedway, Indiana
6	May 25	109th Running of the Indianapolis 500	O Indianapolis Motor Speedway	Speedway, Indiana
7	June 1	Chevrolet Detroit Grand Prix	S Streets of Detroit	Detroit, Michigan
8	June 15	Bommarito Automotive Group 500	O World Wide Technology Raceway	Madison, Illinois
9	June 22	XPEL Grand Prix at Road America	R Road America	Elkhart Lake, Wisconsin
10	July 6	Honda Indy 200 at Mid-Ohio	R Mid-Ohio Sports Car Course	Lexington, Ohio
11	July 12	Synk 275 Powered by Sukup	O Iowa Speedway	Newton, Iowa
12	July 13	Farm to Finish 275 Powered by Sukup	O Iowa Speedway	Newton, Iowa
13	July 20	Ontario Honda Dealers Indy Toronto	S Exhibition Place	Toronto, Ontario
14	July 27	Java House Grand Prix of Monterey	R WeatherTech Raceway Laguna Seca	Monterey, California
15	August 10	BitNile.com Grand Prix of Portland	R Portland International Raceway	Portland, Oregon
16	August 24	Snap-on Milwaukee Mile 250	O Milwaukee Mile	West Allis, Wisconsin
17	August 31	Borchetta Bourbon Music City Grand Prix	O Nashville Superspeedway	Lebanon, Tennessee

=== Schedule changes ===
- The race at the Thermal Club that was the non-championship $1 Million Challenge in 2024 became a full points-paying race in 2025. It was the first American open-wheel racing championship race in Riverside County, California since the 1983 CART season.
- The Milwaukee Mile, which held a double-header in 2024, only hosted a single race in 2025.
- The race at World Wide Technology Raceway moved from August to June.
- On February 18, 2025, INDYCAR announced race lengths were extended for six races.
  - Long Beach – 90 Laps (five additional laps)
  - Mid-Ohio – 90 Laps (ten additional laps)
  - Iowa – 275 Laps (25 additional laps each race)
  - Toronto – 90 Laps (five additional laps)
  - Nashville – 225 Laps (19 additional laps)

=== Sponsorship changes ===
On February 21, Hy-Vee announced that they were ending their event sponsorships for Iowa and Milwaukee. Sukup Manufacturing was announced as the new title sponsor for the Iowa race weekend. Snap-on was announced as the new title sponsor for Milwaukee.

On June 4, IndyCar announced that the sponsorship name of the Nashville race would be changing from the Big Machine Music City Grand Prix to the Borchetta Bourbon Music City Grand Prix for 2025 and beyond.

On July 1, Java House was announced as the new title sponsor for the Monterey Grand Prix.

== Results ==
Rd.	Race	Pole position	Fastest lap	Most laps led	Race winner			Report
Rd.	Race	Pole position	Fastest lap	Most laps led	Driver	Team	Engine	Report
1	St. Petersburg	(New Zealand) Scott McLaughlin	(United States) Josef Newgarden	(New Zealand) Scott McLaughlin	(Spain) Álex Palou	Chip Ganassi Racing	Honda	Report
2	Thermal Club	(Mexico) Pato O'Ward	(Mexico) Pato O'Ward	(Mexico) Pato O'Ward	(Spain) Álex Palou	Chip Ganassi Racing	Honda	Report
3	Long Beach	(United States) Kyle Kirkwood	(Cayman Islands) Kyffin Simpson	(United States) Kyle Kirkwood	(United States) Kyle Kirkwood	Andretti Global	Honda	Report
4	Barber	(Spain) Álex Palou	(Spain) Álex Palou	(Spain) Álex Palou	(Spain) Álex Palou	Chip Ganassi Racing	Honda	Report
5	IMS GP	(Spain) Álex Palou	(Spain) Álex Palou	(United States) Graham Rahal	(Spain) Álex Palou	Chip Ganassi Racing	Honda	Report
6	Indianapolis 500	(Israel) Robert Shwartzman	(Brazil) Hélio Castroneves	(Japan) Takuma Sato	(Spain) Álex Palou	Chip Ganassi Racing	Honda	Report
7	Detroit	(United States) Colton Herta	(Cayman Islands) Kyffin Simpson	(United States) Kyle Kirkwood	(United States) Kyle Kirkwood	Andretti Global	Honda	Report
8	Gateway	(Australia) Will Power	(Spain) Álex Palou	(United States) David Malukas	(United States) Kyle Kirkwood	Andretti Global	Honda	Report
9	Road America	(United Kingdom) Louis Foster	(Sweden) Felix Rosenqvist	(New Zealand) Scott Dixon	(Spain) Álex Palou	Chip Ganassi Racing	Honda	Report
10	Mid-Ohio	(Spain) Álex Palou	(New Zealand) Scott McLaughlin	(Spain) Álex Palou	(New Zealand) Scott Dixon	Chip Ganassi Racing	Honda	Report
11	Iowa 1	(United States) Josef Newgarden	(Mexico) Pato O'Ward	(United States) Josef Newgarden	(Mexico) Pato O'Ward	Arrow McLaren	Chevrolet	Report
12	Iowa 2	(Spain) Álex Palou	(United States) David Malukas	(Spain) Álex Palou	(Spain) Álex Palou	Chip Ganassi Racing	Honda	Report
13	Toronto	(United States) Colton Herta	(United States) Colton Herta	(Spain) Álex Palou	(Mexico) Pato O'Ward	Arrow McLaren	Chevrolet	Report
14	Laguna Seca	(Spain) Álex Palou	(Spain) Álex Palou	(Spain) Álex Palou	(Spain) Álex Palou	Chip Ganassi Racing	Honda	Report
15	Portland	(Denmark) Christian Lundgaard (Note: Christian Lundgaard, the fastest qualifier, was assessed a 6-place grid penalty for an unapproved engine change. Pato O'Ward, who qualified 2nd, was the highest-placed driver not to have a penalty, and thus started the race from pole position. Lundgaard earned the pole award and the pole-winner's championship point.)	(Australia) Will Power	(Australia) Will Power	(Australia) Will Power	Team Penske	Chevrolet	Report
16	Milwaukee	(Spain) Álex Palou	(United States) David Malukas	(Spain) Álex Palou	(Denmark) Christian Rasmussen	Ed Carpenter Racing	Chevrolet	Report
17	Nashville	(Mexico) Pato O'Ward	(Spain) Álex Palou	(Mexico) Pato O'Ward	(United States) Josef Newgarden	Team Penske	Chevrolet	Report

== Season report ==
=== Opening rounds ===
Team Penske's Scott McLaughlin claimed the first pole position of the year at the Firestone Grand Prix of St. Petersburg ahead of Andretti's Colton Herta, but the race was decided on tire strategy after a first-lap collision involving Penske’s Will Power, McLaren’s Nolan Siegel and RLL’s Louis Foster brought out an early caution. Several frontrunners, including CGR's Álex Palou, dove into the pits to switch off the fragile alternate tire. That set up a decisive advantage as the race would run green to the finish. McLaughlin led the most laps before fading during the following pit cycles and Herta’s fight for the win ended with pit lane issues. CGR’s Scott Dixon briefly looked in control despite running without radio communication, before Palou undercut his teammate during the final round of stops and pulled away. Penske’s Josef Newgarden chased him until lapped traffic allowed Dixon to slip past him for second on the final lap. Palou scored his first St. Petersburg victory, starting off his campaign for a championship three-peat in the best way.

McLaren’s Pato O'Ward secured pole position at the Thermal Club IndyCar Grand Prix ahead of teammate Christian Lundgaard, marking the team’s first front row lockout in their IndyCar history, while all three Penske drivers failed to advance past the opening round of qualifying. O’Ward controlled the opening stints and led a race-high 51 laps, with Lundgaard and Palou running close behind as the race unfolded without interruption. Palou gained ground in the final stint by switching to the alternate tire, overtaking Lundgaard after a prolonged battle before rapidly closing down a near ten-second deficit to O’Ward. He completed the winning move on lap 56 and pulled clear to secure his thirteenth career victory by more than ten seconds. The race ran green from start to finish with only minor incidents, and O’Ward finished second with Lundgaard third, giving McLaren two cars on the podium. Herta and MSR’s Felix Rosenqvist completed the top five as Palou extended his lead in the standings to 39 points over O’Ward.

Andretti’s Kyle Kirkwood claimed pole position for the Acura Grand Prix of Long Beach for the second time, ahead of teammate Herta. The race was the second consecutive event to run caution-free and was therefore shaped by tire and pit strategy on the tight street circuit. Kirkwood and Palou both switched to the primary compound early, trading lap times at the head of the field while Herta slipped back after the first pit sequence. Palou gained ground through an undercut on the final round of stops and emerged close behind Kirkwood, but the Andretti driver held firm under pressure and gradually extended his lead to 2.7 seconds to claim Andretti’s first win of the year at the flag. Lundgaard recovered from twelfth on the grid and a crash in qualifying to finish third after passing Rosenqvist in the closing laps, while Power completed the top five. All 27 cars reached the finish, marking the first yellow-free Long Beach race since 2016, as Kirkwood ended Palou’s winning streak and closed to within 34 points of the championship lead.

Palou was back on top in qualifying for the Children's of Alabama Indy Grand Prix, securing pole position ahead of his CGR teammate Marcus Armstrong, with McLaughlin lining up third for Penske. At the start, Palou retained the lead, while Armstrong came under early pressure from McLaughlin and Lundgaard. The race was the third in a row to run without a caution, and differing pit strategies produced several position changes throughout the field. McLaughlin briefly moved ahead during the first cycle, but Palou regained control after the second round of stops, maintaining consistent pace on the primary tire. Behind the leaders, Lundgaard gained ground on the alternate strategy to secure a second consecutive podium, while Armstrong slipped to fourth after losing time in traffic. Herta completed the top five. Further back, rookie Siegel earned his first Fast Six appearance and maiden top-ten finish in ninth. Palou’s third victory in four rounds extended his early advantage in the championship to 60 points over Lundgaard.

Round five, the Sonsio Grand Prix, saw Palou double up in qualifying to take pole position once again as RLL's Graham Rahal started alongside him on the front row. At the start, Rahal overtook Palou into turn 1 and controlled much of the first half of the race, leading 49 laps as both drivers followed similar two-stop strategies under the new tire-compound regulations requiring two stints each on primary and alternate tires. Palou remained close behind and regained the lead into turn 7 on Lap 58, pulling away steadily thereafter. The race featured the first mid-race caution since the season opener: A.J. Foyt's David Malukas stopped on course with 16 laps remaining, erasing Palou’s four-second lead and ending a 408-lap stretch of green flag running. On the restart, Palou held off O’Ward, who rose from eighth on the grid to finish second, while Power completed the podium after starting seventh. Palou’s fourth victory in five races extended his dominant start to the season as he headed into the Indianapolis 500 with a 97-point lead.

Robert Shwartzman claimed a shock pole position for Prema Racing in his first Indianapolis 500 appearance to become the first rookie polesitter since 1983. RLL'S Takuma Sato and O’Ward completed the front row, while the Penske squad’s weekend was overshadowed by disqualification from qualifying for technical violations that sent Newgarden and Power to the back of the grid and prompted major leadership changes within the team. On race day, delayed by rain, Shwartzman initially held firm but faded quickly before crashing and retiring before half-distance, leaving Andretti's Marcus Ericsson, Palou and Malukas to contest the lead through the final stints. Palou moved into position behind Ericsson in the closing stages and completed a decisive pass with 14 laps remaining, holding off the Swede to finally win the Indy 500 after years of near-misses. Ericsson was later disqualified for an illegal aerodynamic modification, promoting Malukas to second and O’Ward to third. Palou now held a 112-point standings lead after just six races.

=== Mid-season rounds ===
Herta claimed his first pole position since Toronto 2024 in qualifying for the Chevrolet Detroit Grand Prix, leading Malukas, who equalled his career-best starting position, and teammate Kirkwood. The race developed into one of the most chaotic events of the season, with frequent cautions and a late red flag disrupting the order. Herta led the early stages, but Kirkwood quickly moved forward and assumed control after passing Siegel, who had briefly cycled to the front on an alternate strategy. Multiple incidents kept the field bunched together, and pit stop timing became decisive as teams juggled tire wear and timing under yellow. Kirkwood maintained track position despite front-wing damage, throughout a late red flag after a heavy crash between Rosenqvist and Foster. He held off Foyt's Santino Ferrucci over the final laps to take his second victory of the season, with Herta completing the podium. Palou retired after contact with Malukas, bringing his three-race winning streak to an end and shortening his championship lead to 90 points.

Next up was the Bommarito Automotive Group 500, where Power claimed pole position, his fifth at the track and 71st overall, leading a Team Penske front-row sweep ahead of McLaughlin as championship leader Palou could manage only ninth. At the start, Power initially maintained the lead, but his race ended early when a tire failure sent him into the wall on lap 47. McLaughlin then assumed control until a mechanical issue on lap 216 forced his retirement. The most significant incident came on lap 131, when Foster brushed the wall and slid into the path of leader Newgarden, launching their cars into a heavy collision that saw both retire. Multiple cautions set up a strategic contest between the remaining frontrunners. Dixon briefly led by stretching his fuel, but Kirkwood undercut the leaders during the final pit cycle and emerged ahead. He held off O’Ward to take his first oval victory, with ECR rookie Christian Rasmussen climbing from 25th to finish third. Palou finished eighth, his championship lead shortened again to 73 points.

Rookie Foster scored his first career IndyCar pole position at the XPEL Grand Prix at Road America, leading championship contenders Palou and Kirkwood. Sunday’s 55-lap race began amid soaring temperatures and early chaos. Three cautions in the opening ten laps eliminated several contenders, including Malukas and Shwartzman, while a later crash for Newgarden triggered the fourth and final yellow on lap 30. Palou, who had dropped back after contact with Power, recovered through a sequence of timely pit stops and fuel management. Lundgaard appeared to be in control before the caution caused by Newgarden reversed the order, favoring those yet to stop. Dixon once again went for an alternative fuel strategy, which saw him lead briefly before he was forced to pit with two laps remaining. That handed the advantage to Palou, who held on to win ahead of Rosenqvist and Ferrucci despite having to save fuel himself. Kirkwood came fourth, losing ground again to Palou in the standings, where the Spaniard now led by 93 points.

The Honda Indy 200 at Mid-Ohio saw Palou claim his third pole position of the season, ahead of Lundgaard, with CGR's Kyffin Simpson taking a career-best third on the grid. Palou converted his pole into an early lead at the start, pulling ahead of Lundgaard as the field settled. The opening lap saw chaos when Newgarden spun at Turn 1 and collected Rahal, ending both of their races and triggering an early caution. Power retired shortly afterward due to contact sustained in the same incident. Once the race resumed, Palou controlled the pace from Lundgaard and Herta, while Dixon advanced from ninth on a two-stop fuel strategy. A second yellow for Rasmussen’s stalled car on lap 31 allowed Dixon to save fuel and stay within reach of the leader. Palou appeared on course for another win until a brief off-track excursion in Turn 9 with six laps remaining allowed Dixon to slip through. The Kiwi held off a late challenge to win by 0.4201s, with Lundgaard coming third. Palou extended his championship lead to 113 points with seven races remaining.

Newgarden became the season's ninth different pole sitter in qualifying for the Synk 275 Powered by Sukup, leading JHR's Conor Daly and Rosenqvist. At the start of the race, Newgarden quickly established control, leading the opening 232 laps. Herta spun on lap 1 to bring out an early caution, and further incidents for DCR's Jacob Abel, Kirkwood, Siegel and Prema's Callum Ilott interrupted the rhythm later on. When Newgarden pitted on lap 233, O’Ward elected to stay out two laps longer and cycled ahead after his stop. Siegel's crash was heavy enough to cause a red flag and force him to miss the weekend's second race. That set up two late restarts, where O’Ward held off Newgarden each time. He won the race by just over 0.2 seconds to take his first victory of 2025 and end an eleven-race win streak for Honda. Power completed the podium in third, while championship leader Palou came fifth. O'Ward's win allowed him to move past Kirkwood to second in the standings, slightly shortening Palou's dominant championship lead to 106 points.

The second race of the double header, the Farm to Finish 275 Powered by Sukup, saw championship leader Palou lead Rosenqvist and Malukas in qualifying. The Spaniard led the opening laps before being passed by Newgarden, who went on to control much of the race. The first caution came immediately when RLL's Devlin DeFrancesco spun into McLaughlin, eliminating both. Mechanical problems ended Will Power’s race after 21 laps, before another yellow on lap 50 when Sting Ray Robb crashed his JHR car. Two tire failures for Andretti later changed the complexion of the race: Ericsson hit the wall on lap 130, and Herta did likewise on lap 254, both times just after Newgarden had pitted from the lead. The timing trapped him a lap down, handing Palou track position. The Spaniard stopped under the second caution, retained the lead on the final restart, and held off Dixon to take his seventh win of the season. Armstrong completed an all-Honda podium as Palou once again extended his championship lead over O’Ward to 129 points.

=== Closing rounds ===
Herta claimed his second pole position of the year at the Ontario Honda Dealers Indy Toronto, leading Palou and Armstrong. At the start, he held his advantage into Turn 1, while O’Ward, who had qualified tenth, made early progress through the field. The Mexican was among several drivers to pit within the first laps to remove the alternate tires, switching to primaries before a caution followed on lap two. That caution elevated O’Ward into a favorable position, and after another yellow for ECR's Alexander Rossi crashing coincided with pit stops, he emerged among the frontrunners. DCR's Rinus VeeKay led briefly on a two-stop strategy but yielded the lead when O’Ward overcut him during the final cycle. A late caution neutralized the finish, giving O’Ward the win ahead of a season-first podium for VeeKay and a career-first podium for Simpson. Championship leader Palou, who tried an alternative strategy that was ultimately hindered by the cautions, finished twelfth, his lead over O’Ward reduced to 99 points with four races remaining.

The Java House Grand Prix of Monterey, saw Palou lead O'Ward and Herta in qualifying. The Spaniard led cleanly at the start and controlled the opening stint while Siegel, running an alternate strategy, cycled to the front for 11 laps before the championship leader reclaimed the lead on lap 37. Early incidents included Shwartzman being pushed into the Turn 3 gravel and a separate collision between Simpson and Rosenqvist that brought out the first caution, followed shortly by another when Abel went off at Turn 2 with brake issues. A mid-race yellow followed after VeeKay was forced into the Turn 3 runoff following contact from Kirkwood, but the race remained green through the subsequent pit exchanges. Lundgaard gained positions through an undercut to run second, but was unable to challenge Palou over two restarts triggered by off-track excursions for Ericsson and Ferrucci. Palou took his eighth win of the season ahead of Lundgaard and Herta, with O’Ward finishing fourth to leave Palou 121 points ahead with three races remaining.

Championship chaser O’Ward started the BitNile.com Grand Prix of Portland from pole position after a six-place grid penalty for Lundgaard. He held the lead through the opening laps until Ferrucci crashed at the final corner on lap 2, triggering the first caution. The restart was short-lived as debris from a double spin for Foster and VeeKay brought out another yellow on lap 8. Racing resumed on lap 11, and a battle between Rasmussen and Daly escalated over several laps until Daly was sent into the Turn 9 tire barrier on lap 15, causing the third caution and removing both drivers from contention. Power moved to the front during the first round of pit stops and established a lead while Lundgaard and Palou settled into second and third. O’Ward’s race unraveled on lap 22 when an electrical issue ended his championship hopes. The remainder of the race ran uninterrupted. In the closing laps Lundgaard closed on Power while Palou pressured both, but Power maintained control to take the win. Palou’s third place secured his fourth championship.

Newly crowned champion Palou secured pole position for the Snap-on Milwaukee Mile 250 ahead of Malukas and O’Ward. The opening lap was interrupted immediately when Siegel spun and hit the wall, prompting the first caution. The restart was short-lived when Rahal slid wide and nearly crashed, bringing out a second yellow. Palou controlled the early stages afterwards while the field committed to a four-stop strategy. Rossi initiated the first pit cycle before lap 50, with further stops around laps 102 and 150. Palou held an advantage over McLaughlin and Newgarden through the middle phase and reasserted the lead after the final round of stops with just under 50 laps remaining. Light rain on lap 209 produced a fifth caution, and Rasmussen was among the drivers pitting for new tyres. Racing resumed with 28 laps to go, and the Dane quickly climbed through the order, passing McLaughlin and then closing on Palou. With 16 laps remaining, he overtook the race leader into turn 3 and held the position to claim his first IndyCar win.

The season finale, the Borchetta Bourbon Music City Grand Prix, saw O'Ward claim pole position ahead of Malukas and Lundgaard. Rasmussen crashed on lap 1, triggering the first caution. O’Ward led the early phase while Malukas held second until lap 83, when contact with the lapped Foster sent him into the wall. The restart preserved O’Ward’s advantage over Palou, but his race ended on lap 127 when a right-front tire failure put him into the same corner. That handed the lead to Power, who then lost a lap after stalling during his pit stop. That briefly cycled Rossi to the front before Newgarden, who had stopped earlier, moved past him on lap 147. Newgarden lost the net lead during the final pit cycle after a slow stop, allowing McLaughlin and Palou to jump ahead. He repassed Palou shortly after and then inherited the lead on lap 205 when McLaughlin brushed the wall. Newgarden controlled the final stint to finish ahead of Palou and McLaughlin, closing a difficult season with a win while Palou ended the year with a 196-point lead.

Across the 17-race season, Palou established control early with four wins from the first five events and extended that momentum through the Indianapolis 500, where he finally claimed victory after several years of contention. His consistency, combined with repeated gains through strategy and minimal errors, allowed him to maintain a triple-digit points advantage for much of the campaign. O’Ward emerged as Palou’s closest title rival after mid-season gains, including victory at Iowa and a strong run of podiums, though mechanical issues at Portland ultimately ended his pursuit. IndyCar’s first season under new broadcast partner and part-owner Fox delivered a 28 per cent increase in average viewership, with 1.2 million viewers marking the best television figures since 2012. The Indianapolis 500 drew its largest audience in 17 years, while several events reported record or near-record attendance.

== Points standings ==
- Ties were broken by number of wins, followed by number of 2nds, 3rds, etc.; then by finishing position in the previous race; then by random draw.

Position	1st	2nd	3rd	4th	5th	6th	7th	8th	9th	10th	11th	12th	13th	14th	15th	16th	17th	18th	19th	20th	21st	22nd	23rd	24th	25th+
Points	50	40	35	32	30	28	26	24	22	20	19	18	17	16	15	14	13	12	11	10	9	8	7	6	5

=== Driver standings ===
- At all races except the Indy 500, the pole position qualifier earned 1 point (unless qualifying was not held). The twelve Indy 500 qualifiers who qualified for the fast 12 session received points based on the results of that session, descending from 12 points for first place.
- Drivers who led at least one race lap were awarded 1 point. The driver who led the most laps during a race scored an additional 2 points.
- Entrant-initiated engine change-outs before the engine reached its required distance run resulted in the loss of 10 points.

Pos	Driver	STP	THE	LBH	BAR	IGP	INDY	DET	GTW	ROA	MOH	IOW		TOR	LAG	POR	MIL	NSS	Pts
1	(Spain) Álex Palou	1^{L}	1^{L}	2	**1**^{L}*	**1**^{L}	1 ^{6L}	25	8	1^{L}	**2**^{L}*	5^{L}	**1**^{L}*	12^{L}*	**1**^{L}*	3^{L}	**2**^{L}*	2^{L}	711
2	(Mexico) Pato O'Ward	11	**2**^{L}*	13	6	2	3 ^{3L}	7^{L}	2^{L}	17	5	1^{L}	5	1^{L}	4	25^{L}	5	**24**^{L}*	515
3	(New Zealand) Scott Dixon	2^{L}	10	8^{L}	12	5	20 ^{4}	11^{L}	4^{L}	9^{L}*	1^{L}	10	2	10	5	11	9	12^{L}	452
4	(United States) Kyle Kirkwood	5	8	**1**^{L}*	11	8	32	1^{L}*	1^{L}	4^{L}	8	26	18^{L}	6	16	20	12	6	433
5	(Denmark) Christian Lundgaard	8^{L}	3	3^{L}	2	16	7 ^{8}	8	14	24^{L}	3	21	6	13	2	**2**	6	25	431
6	(Sweden) Felix Rosenqvist	7	5	4	13	10	4 ^{5}	21^{L}	16^{L}	2^{L}	6	17	7	19	24	9	22^{L}	7	372
7	(United States) Colton Herta	16^{L}	4	7	7	25	14	**3**^{L}	17	16	4^{L}	13	20	**4**^{L}	3	10	11	11^{L}	372
8	(New Zealand) Marcus Armstrong	24^{L}	7	14^{L}	17^{L}	7^{L}	18	6	9	5	7	9^{L}	3	14	8	8	10^{L}	19^{L}	364
9	(Australia) Will Power	26	6	5	5	3	16	4^{L}	**27**	14	26	3^{L}	24	11	7	1^{L}*	26	21^{L}	357
10	(New Zealand) Scott McLaughlin	**4**^{L}*	27	6	3^{L}	4	30 ^{10}	12^{L}	24^{L}	12^{L}	23	4	26	26	10	7	3	3^{L}	356
11	(United States) David Malukas	13	18	17	16	23	2 ^{7L}	14	12^{L}*	7^{L}	17	12	4	9	13	19	8^{L}	26^{L}	318
12	(United States) Josef Newgarden	3^{L}	13	27	10	12	22	9	25^{L}	25	27	**2**^{L}*	10^{L}	24	11	24^{L}	7	1^{L}	316
13	(Denmark) Christian Rasmussen	15	12	23	15	19	6^{L}	24^{L}	3^{L}	18	25	6	8	20	9	12	1^{L}	27	313
14	(Netherlands) Rinus VeeKay	9	17	19	4	9	27	27	7^{L}	10	9	16	12	2^{L}	23	17	15	13^{L}	305
15	(United States) Alexander Rossi	10	9^{L}	15	8	14	28^{L}	10	11^{L}	13	15	25	17	25	15	5	4	10^{L}	297
16	(United States) Santino Ferrucci	14	14	11	18	20	5	2	5^{L}	3	16	8	15	DNS	22	27	14	8	293
17	(Cayman Islands) Kyffin Simpson	18	15	10^{L}	21	27	25	5	15	6^{L}	10^{L}	18	13	3	27	21	20	4	282
18	(United States) Conor Daly	17	16	25	19	15	8^{L}	17	6^{L}	22	19	7	16	15	14	26	13	5^{L}	268
19	(United States) Graham Rahal	12	11	22	14	6^{L}*	17	20	22	20	24	11	19	7	12	4^{L}	24	22	260
20	(Sweden) Marcus Ericsson	6	21	12	20	26	31 ^{9}	13	13^{L}	21	12	15	22	5^{L}	25	22	19	15	234
21	(United Kingdom) Callum Ilott	19	26	21	23	22	33	26	18^{L}	15	13	23	21	8	6	6	25	9	218
22	(United States) Nolan Siegel	25	19	20	9	13	13	19	19	8	11	24	DNS	18	18^{L}	16	27	17	213
23	(United Kingdom) Louis Foster RY	27	24	16	26	11	12	22^{L}	26	**11**^{L}	14	14	14	21	17	13	17^{L}	20	213
24	(Israel) Robert Shwartzman R	20	22	18	25	18	**26** ^{1L}	16	10	27	21	20	9	16	21	15	18	14	211
25	(United States) Sting Ray Robb	21	23	9^{L}	22	21	23	15	20	26	18	22	23	17	19	14	23	16	181
26	(Canada) Devlin DeFrancesco	22	20	24	24	17^{L}	11^{L}	23	23	19	20	19	25	22	20	18	16	18	171
27	(United States) Jacob Abel R	23	25	26	27	24	DNQ	18	21	23	22	27	11	23	26	23	21	23	123
28	(Japan) Takuma Sato						9 ^{2L}*												36
29	(Brazil) Hélio Castroneves						10												20
30	(United States) Ed Carpenter						15^{L}												16
31	(United Kingdom) Jack Harvey						19^{L}												12
32	(United States) Ryan Hunter-Reay						21^{L}												10
33	(United States) Kyle Larson R						24												6
34	(United States) Marco Andretti						29												5
Pos	Driver	STP	THE	LBH	BAR	IGP	INDY	DET	GTW	ROA	MOH	IOW		TOR	LAG	POR	MIL	NSS	Pts

Color	Result
Gold	Winner
Silver	2nd-place finish
Bronze	3rd-place finish
Green	Top 5 finish
Light Blue	Top 10 finish
Dark Blue	Other flagged position
Purple	Did not finish (DNF)
Red	Did not qualify (DNQ)
Brown	Withdrew (Wth)
Black	Disqualified (DSQ)
White	Did Not Start (DNS)
White	Race abandoned (C)
Blank	Did not participate

**In-line notation**
**Bold**	Pole position (1 point; except Indy)
Italics	Ran fastest race lap
^{L}	Led race lap (1 point)
*	Led most race laps (2 points)
^{1–12}	Indy 500 "Fast Twelve" bonus points
^{c}	Qualifying canceled (no bonus point)
RY	Rookie of the Year
R	Rookie

=== Entrant standings ===
Only full-time entries shown. Light-gray background indicates non-chartered entries that were ineligible for the Leader's Circle for the 2025 season.

Pos	Entry	STP	THE	LBH	BAR	IGP	INDY	DET	GAT	ROA	MOH	IOW		TOR	LAG	POR	MIL	NSS	Pts
1	#10 Chip Ganassi Racing	1^{L}	1^{L}	2	**1**^{L}*	**1**^{L}	1^{6L}	25	8	1^{L}	**2**^{L}*	5^{L}	**1**^{L}*	12^{L}*	**1**^{L}*	3^{L}	**2**^{L}*	2^{L}	711
2	#5 Arrow McLaren	11	**2**^{L}*	13	6	2	3^{3L}	7^{L}	2^{L}	17	5	1^{L}	5	1^{L}	4	25^{L}	5	**24**^{L}*	515
3	#9 Chip Ganassi Racing	2^{L}	10	8^{L}	12	5	20^{4}	11^{L}	4^{L}	9^{L}*	1^{L}	10	2	10	5	11	9	12^{L}	452
4	#27 Andretti Global	5	8	**1**^{L}*	11	8	32	1^{L}*	1^{L}	4^{L}	8	26	18^{L}	6	16	20	12	6	433
5	#7 Arrow McLaren	8^{L}	3	3^{L}	2	16	7^{8}	8	14	24^{L}	3	21	6	13	2	**2**	6	25	431
6	#60 Meyer Shank Racing with Curb-Agajanian	7	5	4	13	10	4^{5}	21^{L}	16^{L}	2^{L}	6	17	7	19	24	9	22^{L}	7	372
7	#66 Meyer Shank Racing with Curb-Agajanian	24^{L}	7	14^{L}	17^{L}	7^{L}	18	6	9	5	7	9^{L}	3	14	8	8	10^{L}	19^{L}	364
8	#26 Andretti Global	16^{L}	4 (Note: The #26 Andretti Global entry received a 10 entrant-point penalty and a $25,000 fine for an incorrectly installed anti-intrusion plate on the car during the race at Thermal Club.)	7	7	25	14	**3**^{L}	17	16	4^{L}	13	20	**4**^{L}	3	10	11	11^{L}	362
9	#12 Team Penske	26	6	5	5	3	16	4^{L}	**27**	14	26	3^{L}	24	11	7	1^{L}*	26	21^{L}	357
10	#3 Team Penske	**4**^{L}*	27	6	3^{L}	4	30^{10}	12^{L}	24^{L}	12^{L}	23	4	26	26	10	7	3	3^{L}	356
11	#4 A.J. Foyt Enterprises	13	18	17	16	23	2^{7L}	14	12^{L}*	7^{L}	17	12	4	9	13	19	8^{L}	26^{L}	318
12	#2 Team Penske	3^{L}	13	27	10	12	22	9	25^{L}	25	27	**2**^{L}*	10^{L}	24	11	24^{L}	7	1^{L}	316
13	#21 Ed Carpenter Racing	15	12	23	15	19	6^{L}	24^{L}	3^{L}	18	25	6	8	20	9	12	1^{L}	27	313
14	#18 Dale Coyne Racing	9	17	19	4	9	27	27	7^{L}	10	9	16	12	2^{L}	23	17	15	13^{L}	305
15	#20 Ed Carpenter Racing	10	9^{L}	15	8	14	28^{L}	10	11^{L}	13	15	25	17	25	15	5	4	10^{L}	297
16	#14 A.J. Foyt Enterprises	14	14	11	18	20	5	2 (Note: Santino Ferrucci and the #14 A.J. Foyt Enterprises entry received a 25-point penalty and a $25,000 fine, as well as lost a lap led bonus point and were rendered ineligible for engine manufacturer points, at the Detroit Grand Prix for incorrect driver equivalency weight.)	5^{L}	3	16	8	15	DNS	22	27	14	8	293
17	#8 Chip Ganassi Racing	18	15	10^{L}	21	27	25	5	15	6^{L}	10^{L}	18	13	3	27	21	20	4	282
18	#76 Juncos Hollinger Racing	17	16	25	19	15	8^{L}	17	6^{L}	22	19	7	16	15	14	26	13	5^{L}	268
19	#15 Rahal Letterman Lanigan Racing	12	11	22	14	6^{L}*	17	20	22	20	24	11	19	7	12	4^{L}	24	22	260
20	#28 Andretti Global	6	21	12	20	26	31^{9}	13	13^{L}	21	12	15	22	5^{L}	25	22	19	15	234
21	#90 PREMA Racing	19	26	21	23	22	33	26	18^{L}	15	13	23	21	8	6	6	25	9	218
22	#6 Arrow McLaren	25	19	20	9	13	13	19	19	8	11	24	DNS	18	18^{L}	16	27	17	213
23	#45 Rahal Letterman Lanigan Racing	27	24	16	26	11	12	22^{L}	26	**11**^{L}	14	14	14	21	17	13	17^{L}	20	213
Leaders' Circle cutoff
24	#83 PREMA Racing	20	22 (Note: The #83 PREMA Racing entry received a 10 entrant-point penalty and a $25,000 fine at the race at Thermal Club for making an unapproved modification to the emergency pull cable for the car's fire suppression system.)	18	25	18	**26**^{1L}	16	10	27	21	20	9	16	21	15	18	14	201
25	#77 Juncos Hollinger Racing	21	23	9^{L}	22	21	23	15	20	26	18	22	23	17	19	14	23	16	181
26	#30 Rahal Letterman Lanigan Racing	22	20	24	24	17^{L}	11^{L}	23	23	19	20	19	25	22	20	18	16	18	171
27	#51 Dale Coyne Racing	23	25	26	27	24	DNQ	18	21	23	22	27	11	23	26	23	21	23	123
Pos	Entry	STP	THE	LBH	BAR	IGP	INDY	DET	GAT	ROA	MOH	IOW		TOR	LAG	POR	MIL	NSS	Pts

=== Engine manufacturer standings ===
The top-two finishing full-season eligible entrants for a manufacturer in each race scored points toward the engine manufacturer's championship. Points scored were the same as the driver's championship except for bonus points – a race win was worth five bonus points for a manufacturer, while a pole position was worth one bonus point (except at the Indianapolis 500). A full-season entry was eligible to score manufacturer points until it exceeded the maximum number of allowed engines per entry.

For Indianapolis 500 qualifying, the manufacturer that ran the fastest speed on Saturday received one bonus point; while the manufacturer that qualified on pole position received two bonus points.

Pos	Manufacturer	STP	THE	LBH	BAR	IGP	INDY	DET	GAT	ROA	MOH	IOW		TOR	LAG	POR	MIL	NSS	Pts
1	(Japan) Honda	1	1	1	1	1	1	1	1	1	1	5	1	2	1	2	1	1	1550
1	(Japan) Honda	2	4	2	4	5	4	2	4	2	2	8	2	3	3	3	6	4	1550
1	(Japan) Honda	95^{W}	87^{W}	96^{PW}	88^{PW}	86^{PW}	170^{FW}	96^{PW}	87^{W}	96^{PW}	96^{PW}	54	96^{PW}	76	91^{PW}	75	79^{P}	82	1550
2	(United States) Chevrolet	3	2	3	2	2	2	3	2	3	3	1	3	1	2	1	2	2	1328
2	(United States) Chevrolet	4	3	5	3	3	3	6	3	7	5	2	4	8	4	4	3	3	1328
2	(United States) Chevrolet	68^{P}	76^{P}	65	75	75	152^{P}	63	76^{P}	61	65	96^{PW}	67	79^{W}	72	87^{W}	75	76^{P}	1328
Pos	Manufacturer	STP	THE	LBH	BAR	IGP	INDY	DET	GAT	ROA	MOH	IOW		TOR	LAG	POR	MIL	NSS	Pts

== See also ==
- 2025 Indy NXT
- 2025 USF Pro 2000 Championship
- 2025 USF2000 Championship
- 2025 USF Juniors
