= 2025 Bommarito Automotive Group 500 =

Indycar race held in Madison, Illinois

(United States) 2025 Bommarito Automotive Group 500
Race details
8th round of the 2025 IndyCar season
← Previous race	Next race →
- Layout of the World Wide Technology Raceway
- Date: June 15, 2025
- Official name: Bommarito Automotive Group 500
- Location: World Wide Technology Raceway, Madison, Illinois
- Course: Permanent racing facility 1.25 mi / 2.01 km
- Distance: 260 laps 325 mi / 523 km

Pole position
- Driver: (Australia) Will Power (Team Penske)
- Time: 24.9887

Fastest lap
- Driver: (Spain) Álex Palou (Chip Ganassi Racing)
- Time: 25.7374 (on lap 225 of 260)

Podium
- First: (United States) Kyle Kirkwood (Andretti Global)
- Second: (Mexico) Pato O'Ward (Arrow McLaren)
- Third: (Denmark) Christian Rasmussen (ECR)

Chronology
Previous	Next
2024	2026

The 2025 Bommarito Automotive Group 500 was the eighth round of the 2025 IndyCar season. The race was held on June 15, 2025, in Madison, Illinois at World Wide Technology Raceway. The race was contested of 260 laps. Kyle Kirkwood won the race, his first on an oval, Pato O'Ward finished 2nd, and Christian Rasmussen finished 3rd, his best finish. Scott Dixon and Santino Ferrucci rounded out the top five, while Conor Daly, Rinus VeeKay, Álex Palou, Marcus Armstrong, and Robert Shwartzman rounded out the top ten.

== Entry list ==
Key	Meaning
R	Rookie
W	Past winner

No.	Driver	Team	Engine
2	(United States) Josef Newgarden W	Team Penske	Chevrolet
3	(New Zealand) Scott McLaughlin	Team Penske	Chevrolet
4	(United States) David Malukas	A. J. Foyt Racing	Chevrolet
5	(Mexico) Pato O'Ward	Arrow McLaren	Chevrolet
6	(United States) Nolan Siegel R	Arrow McLaren	Chevrolet
7	(Denmark) Christian Lundgaard	Arrow McLaren	Chevrolet
8	(Cayman Islands) Kyffin Simpson	Chip Ganassi Racing	Honda
9	(New Zealand) Scott Dixon W	Chip Ganassi Racing	Honda
10	(Spain) Álex Palou	Chip Ganassi Racing	Honda
12	(Australia) Will Power W	Team Penske	Chevrolet
14	(United States) Santino Ferrucci	A. J. Foyt Racing	Chevrolet
15	(United States) Graham Rahal	Rahal Letterman Lanigan Racing	Honda
18	(Netherlands) Rinus VeeKay	Dale Coyne Racing	Honda
20	(United States) Alexander Rossi	ECR	Chevrolet
21	(Denmark) Christian Rasmussen	ECR	Chevrolet
26	(United States) Colton Herta	Andretti Global with Curb-Agajanian	Honda
27	(United States) Kyle Kirkwood	Andretti Global	Honda
28	(Sweden) Marcus Ericsson	Andretti Global	Honda
30	(Canada) Devlin DeFrancesco	Rahal Letterman Lanigan Racing	Honda
45	(United Kingdom) Louis Foster R	Rahal Letterman Lanigan Racing	Honda
51	(United States) Jacob Abel R	Dale Coyne Racing	Honda
60	(Sweden) Felix Rosenqvist	Meyer Shank Racing	Honda
66	(New Zealand) Marcus Armstrong	Meyer Shank Racing	Honda
76	(United States) Conor Daly	Juncos Hollinger Racing	Chevrolet
77	(United States) Sting Ray Robb	Juncos Hollinger Racing	Chevrolet
83	(Israel) Robert Shwartzman R	Prema Racing	Chevrolet
90	(United Kingdom) Callum Ilott	Prema Racing	Chevrolet

== Practice ==
Top Practice Speeds
Pos	No.	Driver	Team	Engine	Lap Time
1	2	(United States) Josef Newgarden W	Team Penske	Chevrolet	25.2465
2	3	(New Zealand) Scott McLaughlin	Team Penske	Chevrolet	25.2597
3	4	(United States) David Malukas	A. J. Foyt Racing	Chevrolet	25.3014

== Qualifying ==
Qualifying was originally scheduled to be held at 2:00 PM CT on June 14, 2025, but was rescheduled to 4:30 PM CT on that same day. Each driver completed two laps of the circuit on their qualifying run, with the aggregate timings setting the grid.

The pole was earned by Team Penske's Will Power. This would be Power's 71st career pole and Penske's 700th career pole.

=== Qualifying classification ===
Pos	No.	Driver	Team	Engine	Time	Final grid							
Pos	No.	Driver	Team	Engine	Time	Final grid	1	12	(Australia) Will Power W	Team Penske	Chevrolet	49.9088	1
2	3	(New Zealand) Scott McLaughlin	Team Penske	Chevrolet	50.0603	2							
3	5	(Mexico) Pato O'Ward	Arrow McLaren	Chevrolet	50.2261	3							
4	4	(United States) David Malukas	A. J. Foyt Racing	Chevrolet	50.2572	4							
5	2	(United States) Josef Newgarden W	Team Penske	Chevrolet	50.3046	5							
6	66	(New Zealand) Marcus Armstrong	Meyer Shank Racing	Honda	50.3486	6							
7	60	(Sweden) Felix Rosenqvist	Meyer Shank Racing	Honda	50.3650	7							
8	26	(United States) Colton Herta	Andretti Global with Curb-Agajanian	Honda	50.4171	8							
9	10	(Spain) Álex Palou	Chip Ganassi Racing	Honda	50.4538	9							
10	27	(United States) Kyle Kirkwood	Andretti Global	Honda	50.4968	10							
11	9	(New Zealand) Scott Dixon W	Chip Ganassi Racing	Honda	50.5578	11							
12	20	(United States) Alexander Rossi	ECR	Chevrolet	50.5629	12							
13	28	(Sweden) Marcus Ericsson	Andretti Global	Honda	50.7313	13							
14	7	(Denmark) Christian Lundgaard	Arrow McLaren	Chevrolet	50.8855	14							
15	76	(United States) Conor Daly	Juncos Hollinger Racing	Chevrolet	50.9030	15							
16	90	(United Kingdom) Callum Ilott	Prema Racing	Chevrolet	50.9170	16							
17	30	(Canada) Devlin DeFrancesco	Rahal Letterman Lanigan Racing	Honda	51.0528	17							
18	18	(Netherlands) Rinus VeeKay	Dale Coyne Racing	Honda	51.0715	18							
19	14	(United States) Santino Ferrucci	A. J. Foyt Racing	Chevrolet	51.1472	19							
20	6	(United States) Nolan Siegel R	Arrow McLaren	Chevrolet	51.2007	20							
21	45	(United Kingdom) Louis Foster R	Rahal Letterman Lanigan Racing	Honda	51.4560	21							
22	15	(United States) Graham Rahal	Rahal Letterman Lanigan Racing	Honda	51.5207	22							
23	77	(United States) Sting Ray Robb	Juncos Hollinger Racing	Chevrolet	51.5836	23							
24	83	(Israel) Robert Shwartzman R	Prema Racing	Chevrolet	51.6456	24							
25	21	(Denmark) Christian Rasmussen	ECR	Chevrolet	51.6737	25							
26	8	(Cayman Islands) Kyffin Simpson	Chip Ganassi Racing	Honda	52.0126	26							
27	51	(United States) Jacob Abel R	Dale Coyne Racing	Honda	52.5014	27							

== Practice (post-qualifying) ==
=== Final practice ===
Top Practice Speeds
Pos	No.	Driver	Team	Engine	Lap Time
1	4	(United States) David Malukas	A. J. Foyt Racing	Chevrolet	25.4527
2	2	(United States) Josef Newgarden W	Team Penske	Chevrolet	25.6714
3	10	(United States) Álex Palou	Chip Ganassi Racing	Honda	25.7474

== Race ==
The race was held at 7:00 PM CT on June 15, 2025.

=== Race classification ===
Pos	No.	Driver	Team	Engine	Laps	Time/Retired	Pit Stops	Grid	Laps Led	Pts.
1	27	(United States) Kyle Kirkwood	Andretti Global	Honda	260	2:23:26.7757	5	10	8	51
2	5	(Mexico) Pato O'Ward	Arrow McLaren	Chevrolet	260	+0.5398	5	3	8	41
3	21	(Denmark) Christian Rasmussen	ECR	Chevrolet	260	+0.8896	5	25	1	36
4	9	(New Zealand) Scott Dixon W	Chip Ganassi Racing	Honda	260	+4.2065	6	11	43	33
5	14	(United States) Santino Ferrucci	A. J. Foyt Racing	Chevrolet	260	+8.9459	5	19	8	31
6	76	(United States) Conor Daly	Juncos Hollinger Racing	Chevrolet	260	+10.2934	5	15	36	29
7	18	(Netherlands) Rinus VeeKay	Dale Coyne Racing	Honda	260	+10.4518	5	18	1	27
8	10	(Spain) Álex Palou	Chip Ganassi Racing	Honda	260	+14.1018	5	9		24
9	66	(New Zealand) Marcus Armstrong	Meyer Shank Racing	Honda	260	+19.9565	5	6		22
10	83	(Israel) Robert Shwartzman R	Prema Racing	Chevrolet	260	+21.4104	5	24		20
11	20	(United States) Alexander Rossi	ECR	Chevrolet	260	+23.4350	5	12	2	20
12	4	(United States) David Malukas	A. J. Foyt Racing	Chevrolet	260	+24.2622	5	4	67	21
13	28	(Sweden) Marcus Ericsson	Andretti Global	Honda	260	+25.0222	5	13	2	18
14	7	(Denmark) Christian Lundgaard	Arrow McLaren	Chevrolet	260	+26.6108	6	14		16
15	8	(Cayman Islands) Kyffin Simpson	Chip Ganassi Racing	Honda	259	+1 Lap	6	26		15
16	60	(Sweden) Felix Rosenqvist	Meyer Shank Racing	Honda	259	+1 Lap	7	7	3	15
17	26	(United States) Colton Herta	Andretti Global with Curb-Agajanian	Honda	259	+1 Lap	5	8		13
18	90	(United Kingdom) Callum Ilott	Prema Racing	Chevrolet	259	+1 Lap	6	16	5	13
19	6	(United States) Nolan Siegel R	Arrow McLaren	Chevrolet	259	+1 Lap	8	20		11
20	77	(United States) Sting Ray Robb	Juncos Hollinger Racing	Chevrolet	259	+1 Lap	6	23		10
21	51	(United States) Jacob Abel R	Dale Coyne Racing	Honda	258	+2 Laps	7	27		9
22	15	(United States) Graham Rahal	Rahal Letterman Lanigan Racing	Honda	253	+7 Laps	8	22		8
23	30	(Canada) Devlin DeFrancesco	Rahal Letterman Lanigan Racing	Honda	217	+43 Laps	4	17		7
24	3	(New Zealand) Scott McLaughlin	Team Penske	Chevrolet	216	Mechanical	4	2	51	7
25	2	(United States) Josef Newgarden W	Team Penske	Chevrolet	129	Contact	2	5	25	6
26	45	(United Kingdom) Louis Foster R	Rahal Letterman Lanigan Racing	Honda	128	Contact	2	21		5
27	12	(Australia) Will Power W	Team Penske	Chevrolet	47	Contract		1		6
Fastest lap: (Spain) Álex Palou (Chip Ganassi Racing) – 25.7374 (lap 225)

=== Race statistics ===
Lap Leaders
Laps	Leader
1-50	David Malukas
51-101	Scott McLaughlin
102	Kyle Kirkwood
103-104	Alexander Rossi
105-129	Josef Newgarden
130-133	David Malukas
134	Christian Rasmussen
135-147	David Malukas
148-153	Pato O'Ward
154-189	Conor Daly
190	Pato O'Ward
191-192	Kyle Kirkwood
193	Rinus Veekay
194-236	Scott Dixon
237	Pato O'Ward
238-245	Santino Ferrucci
246-247	Marcus Ericsson
248-249	Callum Ilott
250-252	Felix Rosenqvist
253-255	Callum Ilott
256-260	Kyle Kirkwood

Total laps led
Driver	Laps
David Malukas	67
Scott McLaughlin	51
Scott Dixon	43
Conor Daly	36
Josef Newgarden	25
Kyle Kirkwood	8
Pato O'Ward	8
Santino Ferrucci	8
Callum Ilott	5
Felix Rosenqvist	3
Alexander Rossi	2
Marcus Ericsson	2
Christian Rasmussen	1
Rinus Veekay	1

Cautions: 4 for 47 laps
Laps	Reason
4–9	#30 DeFrancesco crash in turn 1
47–56	#12 Power crash in turn 4
130–148	#2 Newgarden & #45 Foster crash on front straightaway
195-206	#4 Malukas crash in turn 4

== Championship standings after the race ==
Drivers' Championship standings

	Pos.	Driver	Points
Unchanged	1	(Spain) Álex Palou	335
Unchanged	2	(Mexico) Pato O'Ward	262 (–73)
	3	(United States) Kyle Kirkwood	260 (–75)
	4	(Denmark) Christian Lundgaard	221 (–114)
	5	(New Zealand) Scott Dixon	206 (–129)

Engine manufacturer standings

	Pos.	Manufacturer	Points
Unchanged	1	Honda	723
Unchanged	2	Chevrolet	575 (–148)

- Note: Only the top five positions are included.

Previous race: 2025 Chevrolet Detroit Grand Prix	IndyCar Series; 2025 season	Next race: 2025 XPEL Grand Prix at Road America
Previous race: 2024 Bommarito Automotive Group 500	Bommarito Automotive Group 500	Next race: 2026 Bommarito Automotive Group 500
