= Doug Boles =

American motorsports executive (born 1966)

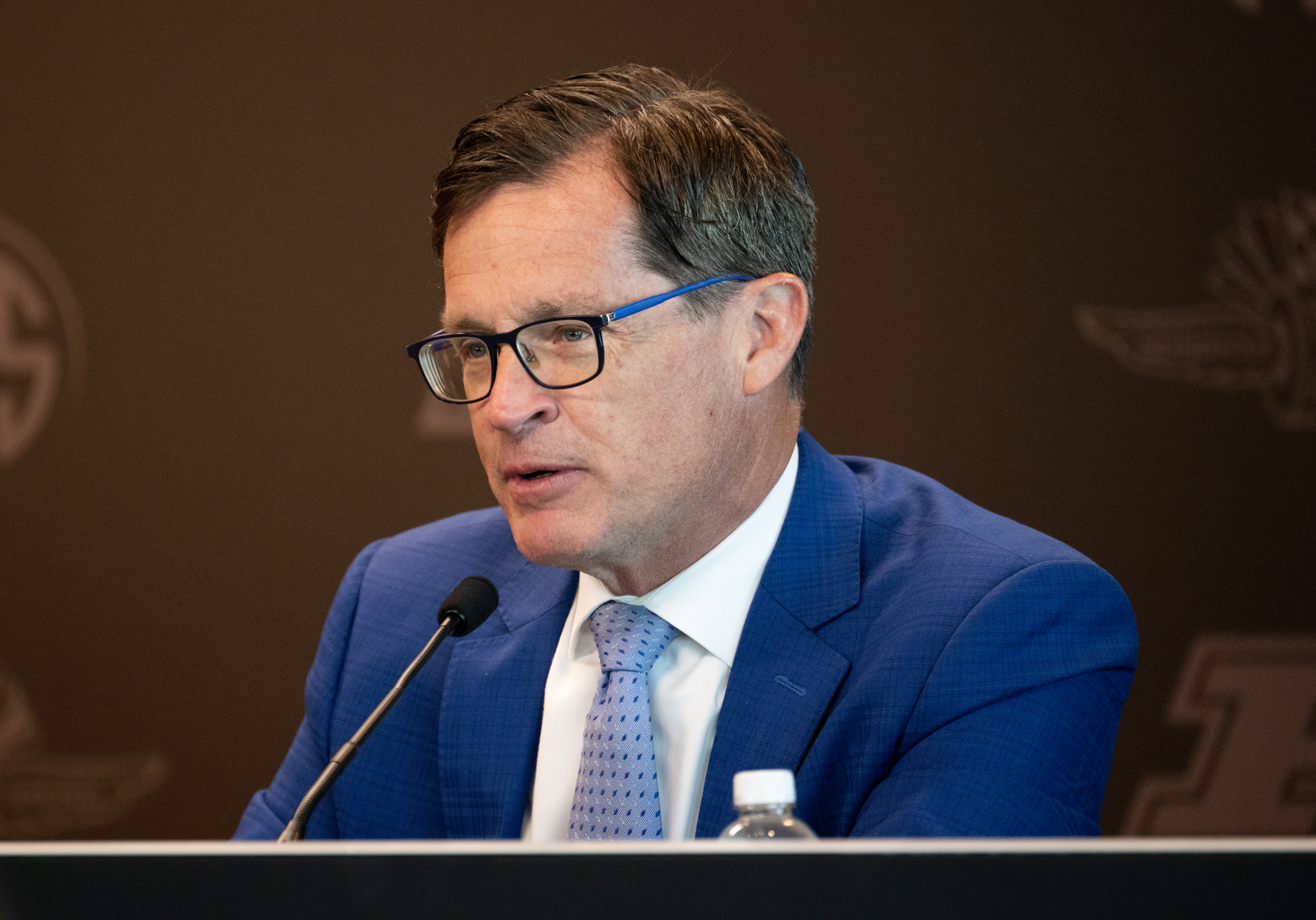
- Boles at Indianapolis Motor Speedway in 2024
- Born: J. Douglas Boles; September 22, 1966 (age 60); Danville, Indiana, U.S.
- Organization(s): Indianapolis Motor Speedway; IndyCar
- Title: President
- Predecessor: Jay Frye
- Spouse: Beth Boles

J. Douglas Boles (born September 22, 1966) is an American motorsports executive. He currently serves as the president of IndyCar and the Indianapolis Motor Speedway. Boles previously was co-owner of Panther Racing.

== Early life ==
Boles grew up in Danville, Indiana, the son of Jeff Boles, a Hendricks County Circuit Court Judge. Jeff Boles served on the Indianapolis 500 observer staff and joined the Indy Racing League as an official upon its formation in 1996.

Boles attended Butler University and graduated with a Journalism degree. He later obtained his Juris Doctor from Indiana University School of Law at Indianapolis in 2000.

After graduating from Butler, Boles worked as a Public Information Officer.

== City of Indianapolis ==
Boles served as assistant campaign manager and spokesman for Republican candidate Stephen Goldsmith in the 1991 Indianapolis mayoral election. Goldsmith was elected with 52.2% of the vote. Once in office, Goldsmith hired Boles as a legislative analyst for the department of transportation. He also served as director of governmental and corporate affairs for the city.

In 1992, Mayor Goldsmith picked Boles to lead the Economic Development Through Motorsports Action Committee, a 13-member committee to attract motorsports businesses to the city. The group was credited with attracting IndyCar teams like Walker Racing to relocate to the city. Boles and the committee helped use government influence to convince banks to loan money to race teams, which had previously been considered a risky loan.

== Panther Racing ==
In 1997, Boles became directly involved in IndyCar racing, serving as spotter for Roberto Guerrero at Pagan Racing.

In August 1997, Pagan Racing was sold and reorganized as Panther Racing. Boles left the office of Mayor Goldsmith and joined the ownership group, which included NFL quarterback Jim Harbaugh, car dealer Gary Pedigo, motorsports executive John Barnes, and television producer Terry Lingner. In addition to his ownership role, Boles also served as Chief Operating Officier for the team.

In 2007, Boles left Panther Racing to join the marketing and advertising agency ignition, Inc. as executive vice-president. He later became partner in the marketing agency i3Worldwide. In addition, he had his own law practice, representing motorsports figures. He also created a motorsports consulting agency, Motorsportslaw.com and Motorsportsbusiness.com.

== Indianapolis Motor Speedway ==
In October 2010, Boles was hired as public relations director for Indianapolis Motor Speedway.

In early 2013, Boles was named interim chief operating officer for IMS. On July 9, 2013, Hulman company CEO, Mark Miles promoted Boles to President of Indianapolis Motor Speedway.

Boles oversaw Project 100, an investment of over $90 million to improve the infrastructure of the Speedway ahead of the 100th Indianapolis 500 in 2016.

Boles remained as President of Indianapolis Motor Speedway when Roger Penske purchased the track and IndyCar in November 2019.

In February 2025, Boles was named as president of IndyCar in addition to remaining as president of Indianapolis Motor Speedway.

== Personal life ==
Boles is married to his wife, Beth Boles. The couple have one child together, and Boles is step-father to Beth's three sons, including racer Conor Daly.

In 2025, Boles was awarded the Sagamore of the Wabash award by Governor Eric Holcomb, the highest honor presented to a citizen of Indiana by the governor.
