= 2025 Ontario Honda Dealers Indy Toronto =

IndyCar race held in Toronto, Ontario, Canada

(Canada) 2025 Ontario Honda Dealers Indy Toronto
Race details
13th round of the 2025 IndyCar season
← Previous race	Next race →
- Layout of the Exhibition Place circuit
- Date: July 20, 2025
- Official name: Ontario Honda Dealers Indy Toronto
- Location: Exhibition Place, Toronto, Ontario, Canada
- Course: Temporary road course 1.786 mi / 2.874 km
- Distance: 90 laps 160.72 mi / 258.66 km

Pole position
- Driver: (United States) Colton Herta (Andretti Global with Curb Agajanian)
- Time: 59.8320

Fastest lap
- Driver: (United States) Colton Herta (Andretti Global with Curb Agajanian)
- Time: 1:01.6540 (on lap 66 of 90)

Podium
- First: (Mexico) Pato O'Ward (Arrow McLaren)
- Second: (Netherlands) Rinus Veekay (Dale Coyne Racing)
- Third: (Cayman Islands) Kyffin Simpson (Chip Ganassi Racing)

Chronology
Previous	Next
2024	2026

The 2025 Ontario Honda Dealers Indy Toronto was the thirteenth round of the 2025 IndyCar season. The race was held on July 20, 2025, in Toronto, Ontario, Canada at the Exhibition Place circuit. The race contested of 90 laps. Pato O'Ward won the race, Rinus VeeKay finished 2nd, and Kyffin Simpson finished 3rd, his first career podium. Colton Herta and Marcus Ericsson rounded out the top five, while Kyle Kirkwood, Graham Rahal, Callum Ilott, David Malukas, and Scott Dixon rounded out the top ten.

== Entry list ==
Key	Meaning
R	Rookie
W	Past winner

No.	Driver	Team	Engine
2	(United States) Josef Newgarden W	Team Penske	Chevrolet
3	(New Zealand) Scott McLaughlin	Team Penske	Chevrolet
4	(United States) David Malukas	A. J. Foyt Racing	Chevrolet
5	(Mexico) Pato O'Ward	Arrow McLaren	Chevrolet
6	(United States) Nolan Siegel R	Arrow McLaren	Chevrolet
7	(Denmark) Christian Lundgaard W	Arrow McLaren	Chevrolet
8	(Cayman Islands) Kyffin Simpson	Chip Ganassi Racing	Honda
9	(New Zealand) Scott Dixon W	Chip Ganassi Racing	Honda
10	(Spain) Álex Palou	Chip Ganassi Racing	Honda
12	(Australia) Will Power W	Team Penske	Chevrolet
14	(United States) Santino Ferrucci	A. J. Foyt Racing	Chevrolet
15	(United States) Graham Rahal	Rahal Letterman Lanigan Racing	Honda
18	(Netherlands) Rinus VeeKay	Dale Coyne Racing	Honda
20	(United States) Alexander Rossi	ECR	Chevrolet
21	(Denmark) Christian Rasmussen	ECR	Chevrolet
26	(United States) Colton Herta W	Andretti Global with Curb-Agajanian	Honda
27	(United States) Kyle Kirkwood	Andretti Global	Honda
28	(Sweden) Marcus Ericsson	Andretti Global	Honda
30	(Canada) Devlin DeFrancesco	Rahal Letterman Lanigan Racing	Honda
45	(United Kingdom) Louis Foster R	Rahal Letterman Lanigan Racing	Honda
51	(United States) Jacob Abel R	Dale Coyne Racing	Honda
60	(Sweden) Felix Rosenqvist	Meyer Shank Racing	Honda
66	(New Zealand) Marcus Armstrong	Meyer Shank Racing	Honda
76	(United States) Conor Daly	Juncos Hollinger Racing	Chevrolet
77	(United States) Sting Ray Robb	Juncos Hollinger Racing	Chevrolet
83	(Israel) Robert Shwartzman R	Prema Racing	Chevrolet
90	(United Kingdom) Callum Ilott	Prema Racing	Chevrolet

== Practice ==
=== Practice 1 ===
The first practice session was held on Friday, July 18, at 3:00 PM ET.

Top Practice Speeds
Pos	No.	Driver	Team	Engine	Lap Time
1	27	(United States) Kyle Kirkwood	Andretti Global	Honda	01:01.2054
2	3	(New Zealand) Scott McLaughlin	Team Penske	Chevrolet	01:01.3411
3	10	(Spain) Álex Palou	Chip Ganassi Racing	Honda	01:01.5987
First practice results

=== Practice 2 ===
The second and final practice session was held on Saturday, July 19, at 10:30 AM ET.

Top Practice Speeds
Pos	No.	Driver	Team	Engine	Lap Time
1	26	(United States) Colton Herta W	Andretti Global	Honda	01:00.0578
2	27	(United States) Kyle Kirkwood	Andretti Global	Honda	01:00.1578
3	2	(United States) Josef Newgarden W	Team Penske	Chevrolet	01:00.5885
Second practice results

== Qualifying ==
Qualifying was held at 2:30 PM ET on July 19, 2025.

=== Qualifying classification ===
Pos	No.	Driver	Team	Engine	Time	Final grid
1	26	(United States) Colton Herta W	Andretti Global with Curb Agajanian	Honda	59.8320	1
2	10	(Spain) Álex Palou	Chip Ganassi Racing	Honda	1:00.1078	2
3	66	(New Zealand) Marcus Armstrong	Meyer Shank Racing	Honda	1:00.3535	3
4	12	(Australia) Will Power W	Team Penske	Chevrolet	1:00.4519	4
5	15	(United States) Graham Rahal	Rahal Letterman Lanigan Racing	Honda	1:00.8600	5
6	27	(United States) Kyle Kirkwood	Andretti Global	Honda	1:04.5308	6
7	45	(United Kingdom) Louis Foster R	Rahal Letterman Lanigan Racing	Honda	1:00.6684	7
8	28	(Sweden) Marcus Ericsson	Andretti Global	Honda	1:00.7134	8
9	18	(Netherlands) Rinus VeeKay	Dale Coyne Racing	Honda	1:00.7744	9
10	5	(Mexico) Pato O'Ward	Arrow McLaren	Chevrolet	1:00.9795	10
11	9	(New Zealand) Scott Dixon W	Chip Ganassi Racing	Honda	1:01.7348	11
12	90	(United Kingdom) Callum Ilott	Prema Racing	Chevrolet	1:01.8834	12
13	6	(United States) Nolan Siegel R	Arrow McLaren	Chevrolet	1:00.3464	13
14	8	(Cayman Islands) Kyffin Simpson	Chip Ganassi Racing	Honda	1:00.2535	14
15	3	(New Zealand) Scott McLaughlin	Team Penske	Chevrolet	1:00.3824	15
16	4	(United States) David Malukas	A. J. Foyt Racing	Chevrolet	1:00.2941	16
17	60	(Sweden) Felix Rosenqvist	Meyer Shank Racing	Honda	1:00.4190	17
18	2	(United States) Josef Newgarden W	Team Penske	Chevrolet	1:00.3520	18
19	7	(Denmark) Christian Lundgaard W	Arrow McLaren	Chevrolet	1:00.4520	19
20	83	(Israel) Robert Shwartzman R	Prema Racing	Chevrolet	1:00.3795	20
21	76	(United States) Conor Daly	Juncos Hollinger Racing	Chevrolet	1:00.5261	21
22	21	(Denmark) Christian Rasmussen	ECR	Chevrolet	1:00.4190	22
23	14	(United States) Santino Ferrucci	A. J. Foyt Racing	Chevrolet	1:00.7058	23
24	20	(United States) Alexander Rossi	ECR	Chevrolet	1:00.6843	24
25	77	(United States) Sting Ray Robb	Juncos Hollinger Racing	Chevrolet	1:01.0717	25
26	30	(Canada) Devlin DeFrancesco	Rahal Letterman Lanigan Racing	Honda	1:00.7530	26
27	51	(United States) Jacob Abel R	Dale Coyne Racing	Honda	1:01.8019	27
Qualifying results

Notes

- **Bold text** indicates fastest time.

== Warmup ==
The warmup was held on Sunday, July 20, at 8:30 AM ET.

Top Practice Speeds
Pos	No.	Driver	Team	Engine	Lap Time
1	7	(Denmark) Christian Lundgaard W	Arrow McLaren	Chevrolet	1:06.1219
2	6	(United States) Nolan Siegel R	Arrow McLaren	Chevrolet	1:07.3039
3	14	(United States) Santino Ferrucci	A. J. Foyt Racing	Chevrolet	1:07.4133
Warmup results

== Race ==
The race was held at 12:00 PM ET on July 20, 2025. After a hard-crash in warmup, Santino Ferrucci was not cleared by IndyCar Medical and would not compete.

=== Race classification ===
Pos	No.	Driver	Team	Engine	Laps	Time/Retired	Pit Stops	Grid	Laps Led	Pts.
1	5	(Mexico) Pato O'Ward	Arrow McLaren	Chevrolet	90	1:48:23.9092	3	10	30	51
2	18	(Netherlands) Rinus VeeKay	Dale Coyne Racing	Honda	90	+0.4843	2	9	16	41
3	8	(Cayman Islands) Kyffin Simpson	Chip Ganassi Racing	Honda	90	+1.5343	2	13	0	35
4	26	(United States) Colton Herta W	Andretti Global with Curb Agajanian	Honda	90	+2.1607	3	1	6	34
5	28	(Sweden) Marcus Ericsson	Andretti Global	Honda	90	+3.7515	3	8	1	31
6	27	(United States) Kyle Kirkwood	Andretti Global	Honda	90	+4.9472	3	6	0	28
7	15	(United States) Graham Rahal	Rahal Letterman Lanigan Racing	Honda	90	+5.5657	3	5	0	26
8	90	(United Kingdom) Callum Ilott	Prema Racing	Chevrolet	90	+6.5438	3	11	0	24
9	4	(United States) David Malukas	A. J. Foyt Racing	Chevrolet	90	+7.6451	3	15	0	22
10	9	(New Zealand) Scott Dixon W	Chip Ganassi Racing	Honda	90	+8.6954	2	17	0	20
11	12	(Australia) Will Power W	Team Penske	Chevrolet	90	+14.0964	3	4	0	19
12	10	(Spain) Álex Palou	Chip Ganassi Racing	Honda	90	+14.9701	2	2	37	21
13	7	(Denmark) Christian Lundgaard W	Arrow McLaren	Chevrolet	90	+17.3640	2	19	0	17
14	66	(New Zealand) Marcus Armstrong	Meyer Shank Racing	Honda	90	+43.9148	3	3	0	16
15	76	(United States) Conor Daly	Juncos Hollinger Racing	Chevrolet	90	+45.4310	3	21	0	15
16	83	(Israel) Robert Shwartzman R	Prema Racing	Chevrolet	90	+46.0249	3	20	0	14
17	77	(United States) Sting Ray Robb	Juncos Hollinger Racing	Chevrolet	89	–1 Lap	2	25	0	13
18	6	(United States) Nolan Siegel R	Arrow McLaren	Chevrolet	87	Accident	3	12	0	12
19	60	(Sweden) Felix Rosenqvist	Meyer Shank Racing	Honda	86	Accident	3	16	0	11
20	21	(Denmark) Christian Rasmussen	ECR	Chevrolet	82	Retired	2	22	0	10
21	45	(United Kingdom) Louis Foster R	Rahal Letterman Lanigan Racing	Honda	67	–23 Laps	2	7	0	9
22	30	(Canada) Devlin DeFrancesco	Rahal Letterman Lanigan Racing	Honda	57	Retired	2	26	0	8
23	51	(United States) Jacob Abel R	Dale Coyne Racing	Honda	36	Accident	2	27	0	7
24	2	(United States) Josef Newgarden W	Team Penske	Chevrolet	36	Accident	1	18	0	6
25	20	(United States) Alexander Rossi	ECR	Chevrolet	29	Accident	0	24	0	5
26	3	(New Zealand) Scott McLaughlin	Team Penske	Chevrolet	2	Accident	1	14	0	5
27	14	(United States) Santino Ferrucci	A. J. Foyt Racing	Chevrolet	0	Did Not Start	0	23	0	3
Fastest lap: (United States) Colton Herta (Andretti Global with Curb Agajanian) – 1:01.6540 (lap 66)
Race results

== Championship standings after the race ==
Drivers' Championship standings

	Pos.	Driver	Points
Unchanged	1	(Spain) Álex Palou	536
Unchanged	2	(Mexico) Pato O'Ward	437 (–99)
1	3	(United States) Kyle Kirkwood	363 (–173)
1	4	(New Zealand) Scott Dixon	362 (–174)
Unchanged	5	(Denmark) Christian Lundgaard	317 (–219)

Engine manufacturer standings

	Pos.	Manufacturer	Points
Unchanged	1	Honda	1223
Unchanged	2	Chevrolet	1018 (–205)

- Note: Only the top five positions are included.

Previous race: 2025 Sukup IndyCar Race Weekend	IndyCar Series; 2025 season	Next race: 2025 Java House Grand Prix of Monterey
Previous race: 2024 Honda Indy Toronto	Grand Prix of Toronto	Next race: Last race
