= 2025 Java House Grand Prix of Monterey =

IndyCar race held in Monterey, California

(United States) 2025 Java House Grand Prix of Monterey
Race details
14th round of the 2025 IndyCar season
← Previous race	Next race →
- Layout of WeatherTech Raceway Laguna Seca
- Date: July 27, 2025
- Official name: Java House Grand Prix of Monterey
- Location: WeatherTech Raceway Laguna Seca, Monterey, California
- Course: Permanent racing facility 2.238 mi / 3.602 km
- Distance: 95 laps 212.61 mi / 342.163 km

Pole position
- Driver: (Spain) Álex Palou (Chip Ganassi Racing)
- Time: 01:08.3413

Fastest lap
- Driver: (Spain) Álex Palou (Chip Ganassi Racing)
- Time: 01:10.7851 (on lap 9 of 95)

Podium
- First: (Spain) Álex Palou (Chip Ganassi Racing)
- Second: (Denmark) Christian Lundgaard (Arrow McLaren)
- Third: (United States) Colton Herta (Andretti Global)

Chronology
Previous	Next
2024	2026

The 2025 Java House Grand Prix of Monterey was the fourteenth round of the 2025 IndyCar season. The race was held on July 27, 2025, in Monterey, California at the WeatherTech Raceway Laguna Seca. The race was contested of 95 laps. Álex Palou won the race, his 8th of the season, Christian Lundgaard finished 2nd, and Colton Herta finished 3rd. Pato O'Ward and Scott Dixon rounded out the top five, while Callum Ilott, Will Power, Marcus Armstrong, Christian Rasmussen, and Scott McLaughlin rounded out the top ten.

== Entry list ==
Key	Meaning
R	Rookie
W	Past winner

No.	Driver	Team	Engine
2	(United States) Josef Newgarden	Team Penske	Chevrolet
3	(New Zealand) Scott McLaughlin	Team Penske	Chevrolet
4	(United States) David Malukas	A.J. Foyt Enterprises	Chevrolet
5	(Mexico) Pato O'Ward	Arrow McLaren	Chevrolet
6	(United States) Nolan Siegel R	Arrow McLaren	Chevrolet
7	(Denmark) Christian Lundgaard	Arrow McLaren	Chevrolet
8	(Cayman Islands) Kyffin Simpson	Chip Ganassi Racing	Honda
9	(New Zealand) Scott Dixon W	Chip Ganassi Racing	Honda
10	(Spain) Álex Palou W	Chip Ganassi Racing	Honda
12	(Australia) Will Power	Team Penske	Chevrolet
14	(United States) Santino Ferrucci	A.J. Foyt Enterprises	Chevrolet
15	(United States) Graham Rahal	Rahal Letterman Lanigan Racing	Honda
18	(Netherlands) Rinus VeeKay	Dale Coyne Racing	Honda
20	(United States) Alexander Rossi	Ed Carpenter Racing	Chevrolet
21	(Denmark) Christian Rasmussen	Ed Carpenter Racing	Chevrolet
26	(United States) Colton Herta W	Andretti Global	Honda
27	(United States) Kyle Kirkwood	Andretti Global	Honda
28	(Sweden) Marcus Ericsson	Andretti Global	Honda
30	(Canada) Devlin DeFrancesco	Rahal Letterman Lanigan Racing	Honda
45	(United Kingdom) Louis Foster R	Rahal Letterman Lanigan Racing	Honda
51	(United States) Jacob Abel R	Dale Coyne Racing	Honda
60	(Sweden) Felix Rosenqvist	Meyer Shank Racing with Curb-Agajanian	Honda
66	(New Zealand) Marcus Armstrong	Meyer Shank Racing with Curb-Agajanian	Honda
76	(United States) Conor Daly	Juncos Hollinger Racing	Chevrolet
77	(United States) Sting Ray Robb	Juncos Hollinger Racing	Chevrolet
83	(Israel) Robert Shwartzman R	PREMA Racing	Chevrolet
90	(United Kingdom) Callum Ilott	PREMA Racing	Chevrolet

== Practice ==
=== Practice 1 ===
The first practice session was held on Friday, July 25, at 5:00 PM ET.

Top Practice Speeds
Pos	No.	Driver	Team	Engine	Lap Time
1	5	(Mexico) Pato O'Ward	Arrow McLaren	Chevrolet	01:09.2069
2	26	(United States) Colton Herta	Andretti Global	Honda	01:09.3173
3	66	(New Zealand) Marcus Armstrong	Meyer Shank Racing with Curb-Agajanian	Honda	01:09.3174

=== Practice 2 ===
The second practice session was to be held on Saturday, July 26, at 11:30 AM ET, but was canceled due to weather.

== Qualifying ==
Qualifying was held at 2:30 PM ET on July 26, 2025.

=== Qualifying classification ===
Pos	No.	Driver	Team	Engine	Time	Final grid
1	10	(Spain) Álex Palou	Chip Ganassi Racing	Honda	01:08.3413	1
2	5	(Mexico) Pato O'Ward	Arrow McLaren	Chevrolet	01:08.6280	2
3	26	(United States) Colton Herta	Andretti Global	Honda	01:08.8824	3
4	2	(United States) Josef Newgarden	Team Penske	Chevrolet	01:09.6695	4
5	12	(Australia) Will Power	Team Penske	Chevrolet	01:10.0062	5
6	4	(United States) David Malukas	A.J. Foyt Enterprises	Chevrolet	01:10.1811	6
7	7	(Denmark) Christian Lundgaard	Arrow McLaren	Chevrolet	01:09.2131	7
8	15	(United States) Graham Rahal	Rahal Letterman Lanigan Racing	Honda	01:09.2658	8
9	45	(United Kingdom) Louis Foster	Rahal Letterman Lanigan Racing	Honda	01:09.2791	9
10	66	(New Zealand) Marcus Armstrong	Meyer Shank Racing with Curb-Agajanian	Honda	01:09.2993	10
11	21	(Denmark) Christian Rasmussen	Ed Carpenter Racing	Chevrolet	01:09.7246	11
12	60	(Sweden) Felix Rosenqvist	Meyer Shank Racing with Curb-Agajanian	Honda	01:09.8116	12
13	3	(New Zealand) Scott McLaughlin	Team Penske	Chevrolet	01:08.9903	13
14	8	(Cayman Islands) Kyffin Simpson	Chip Ganassi Racing	Honda	01:09.3156	14
15	28	(Sweden) Marcus Ericsson	Andretti Global	Honda	01:09.0966	15
16	6	(United States) Nolan Siegel	Arrow McLaren	Chevrolet	01:09.3535	16
17	18	(Netherlands) Rinus VeeKay	Dale Coyne Racing	Honda	01:09.2042	17
18	27	(United States) Kyle Kirkwood	Andretti Global	Honda	01:09.3875	18
19	9	(New Zealand) Scott Dixon	Chip Ganassi Racing	Honda	01:09.2652	19
20	14	(United States) Santino Ferrucci	A.J. Foyt Enterprises	Chevrolet	01:09.4663	20
21	51	(United States) Jacob Abel	Dale Coyne Racing	Honda	01:09.3942	21
22	20	(United States) Alexander Rossi	Ed Carpenter Racing	Chevrolet	01:09.4788	22
23	76	(United States) Conor Daly	Juncos Hollinger Racing	Chevrolet	01:09.4508	23
24	90	(United Kingdom) Callum Ilott	PREMA Racing	Chevrolet	01:09.5751	24
25	83	(Israel) Robert Shwartzman	PREMA Racing	Chevrolet	01:09.5634	25
26	77	(United States) Sting Ray Robb	Juncos Hollinger Racing	Chevrolet	01:10.0509	26
27	30	(Canada) Devlin DeFrancesco	Rahal Letterman Lanigan Racing	Honda	01:15.8287	27

== Race ==
The race was held at 3:00 PM ET on July 27, 2025. Álex Palou, driving for Chip Ganassi Racing, would earn his 19th career victory and eighth of the year.

=== Race classification ===
Pos	No.	Driver	Team	Engine	Laps	Time/Retired	Pit Stops	Grid	Laps Led	Pts.
1	10	(Spain) Álex Palou W	Chip Ganassi Racing	Honda	95	02:05:00.1159	3	1	84	54
2	7	(Denmark) Christian Lundgaard	Arrow McLaren	Chevrolet	95	3.7965	3	7	0	40
3	26	(United States) Colton Herta W	Andretti Global	Honda	95	4.4630	3	3	0	35
4	5	(Mexico) Pato O'Ward	Arrow McLaren	Chevrolet	95	6.6484	3	2	0	32
5	9	(New Zealand) Scott Dixon W	Chip Ganassi Racing	Honda	95	7.3422	3	19	0	30
6	90	(United Kingdom) Callum Ilott	PREMA Racing	Chevrolet	95	8.9243	3	24	0	28
7	12	(Australia) Will Power	Team Penske	Chevrolet	95	11.5298	3	5	0	26
8	66	(New Zealand) Marcus Armstrong	Meyer Shank Racing with Curb-Agajanian	Honda	95	13.0055	3	10	0	24
9	21	(Denmark) Christian Rasmussen	Ed Carpenter Racing	Chevrolet	95	14.0988	3	11	0	22
10	3	(New Zealand) Scott McLaughlin	Team Penske	Chevrolet	95	14.5960	3	13	0	20
11	2	(United States) Josef Newgarden	Team Penske	Chevrolet	95	15.2224	3	4	0	19
12	15	(United States) Graham Rahal	Rahal Letterman Lanigan Racing	Honda	95	16.5256	3	8	0	18
13	4	(United States) David Malukas	A.J. Foyt Enterprises	Chevrolet	95	16.9614	4	6	0	17
14	76	(United States) Conor Daly	Juncos Hollinger Racing	Chevrolet	95	17.8336	5	23	0	16
15	20	(United States) Alexander Rossi	Ed Carpenter Racing	Chevrolet	95	19.1194	4	22	0	15
16	27	(United States) Kyle Kirkwood	Andretti Global	Honda	95	19.7294	5	18	0	14
17	45	(United Kingdom) Louis Foster R	Rahal Letterman Lanigan Racing	Honda	95	21.5898	3	9	0	13
18	6	(United States) Nolan Siegel R	Arrow McLaren	Chevrolet	95	29.3009	4	16	11	12
19	77	(United States) Sting Ray Robb	Juncos Hollinger Racing	Chevrolet	95	30.4964	5	26	0	11
20	30	(Canada) Devlin DeFrancesco	Rahal Letterman Lanigan Racing	Honda	94	-1 Lap	5	27	0	10
21	83	(Israel) Robert Shwartzman R	PREMA Racing	Chevrolet	94	-1 Lap	5	25	0	9
22	14	(United States) Santino Ferrucci	A.J. Foyt Enterprises	Chevrolet	94	-1 Lap	4	20	0	8
23	18	(Netherlands) Rinus VeeKay	Dale Coyne Racing	Honda	92	-3 Laps	4	17	0	7
24	60	(Sweden) Felix Rosenqvist	Meyer Shank Racing with Curb-Agajanian	Honda	91	-4 Laps	6	12	0	6
25	28	(Sweden) Marcus Ericsson	Andretti Global	Honda	78	Mechanical	3	15	0	5
26	51	(United States) Jacob Abel R	Dale Coyne Racing	Honda	10	Contact	0	51	0	5
27	8	(Cayman Islands) Kyffin Simpson	Chip Ganassi Racing	Honda	0	Contact	0	14	0	5
Fastest lap: (Spain) Alex Palou (Chip Ganassi Racing) – 1:10.7851 sec (lap 9)

== Championship standings after the race ==
Drivers' Championship standings

	Pos.	Driver	Points
Unchanged	1	(Spain) Álex Palou	590
Unchanged	2	(Mexico) Pato O'Ward	469 (–121)
1	3	(New Zealand) Scott Dixon	392 (–198)
1	3	(United States) Kyle Kirkwood	363 (–213)
Unchanged	5	(Denmark) Christian Lundgaard	317 (–233)

Engine manufacturer standings

	Pos.	Manufacturer	Points
Unchanged	1	Honda	1314
Unchanged	2	Chevrolet	1090 (–224)

- Note: Only the top five positions are included.

Previous race: 2025 Ontario Honda Dealers Indy Toronto	IndyCar Series; 2025 season	Next race: 2025 BitNile.com Grand Prix of Portland
Previous race: 2024 Firestone Grand Prix of Monterey	IndyCar Monterey Grand Prix	Next race: 2026 Java House Grand Prix of Monterey
