= 2025 Snap-on Milwaukee Mile 250 =

IndyCar race held in West Allis, Wisconsin

(United States) 2025 Snap-on Milwaukee Mile 250
Race details
16th round of the 2025 IndyCar season
← Previous race	Next race →
- Layout of the Milwaukee Mile
- Date: August 24, 2025
- Official name: Snap-on Milwaukee Mile 250
- Location: Milwaukee Mile, West Allis, Wisconsin
- Course: Permanent racing facility 1 mi / 1.6 km
- Distance: 250 laps 253.750 mi / 408.371 km

Pole position
- Driver: (Spain) Álex Palou (Chip Ganassi Racing)
- Time: 00:44.8422

Fastest lap
- Driver: (United States) David Malukas (Andretti Global)
- Time: 00:23.1954 (on lap 16 of 250)

Podium
- First: (Denmark) Christian Rasmussen (Ed Carpenter Racing)
- Second: (Spain) Álex Palou (Chip Ganassi Racing)
- Third: (New Zealand) Scott McLaughlin (Team Penske)

Chronology
Previous	Next
2024	2026

The 2025 Snap-on Milwaukee Mile 250 was the sixteenth and penultimate round of the 2025 IndyCar season. The race was held on August 24, 2025, in West Allis, Wisconsin at the Milwaukee Mile. The race was contested at 250 laps. Christian Rasmussen won the race, his first career victory, Álex Palou finished 2nd, and Scott McLaughlin finished 3rd. Alexander Rossi and Pato O'Ward rounded out the top five, while Christian Lundgaard, Josef Newgarden, David Malukas, Scott Dixon, and Marcus Armstrong rounded out the top ten.

== Entry list ==
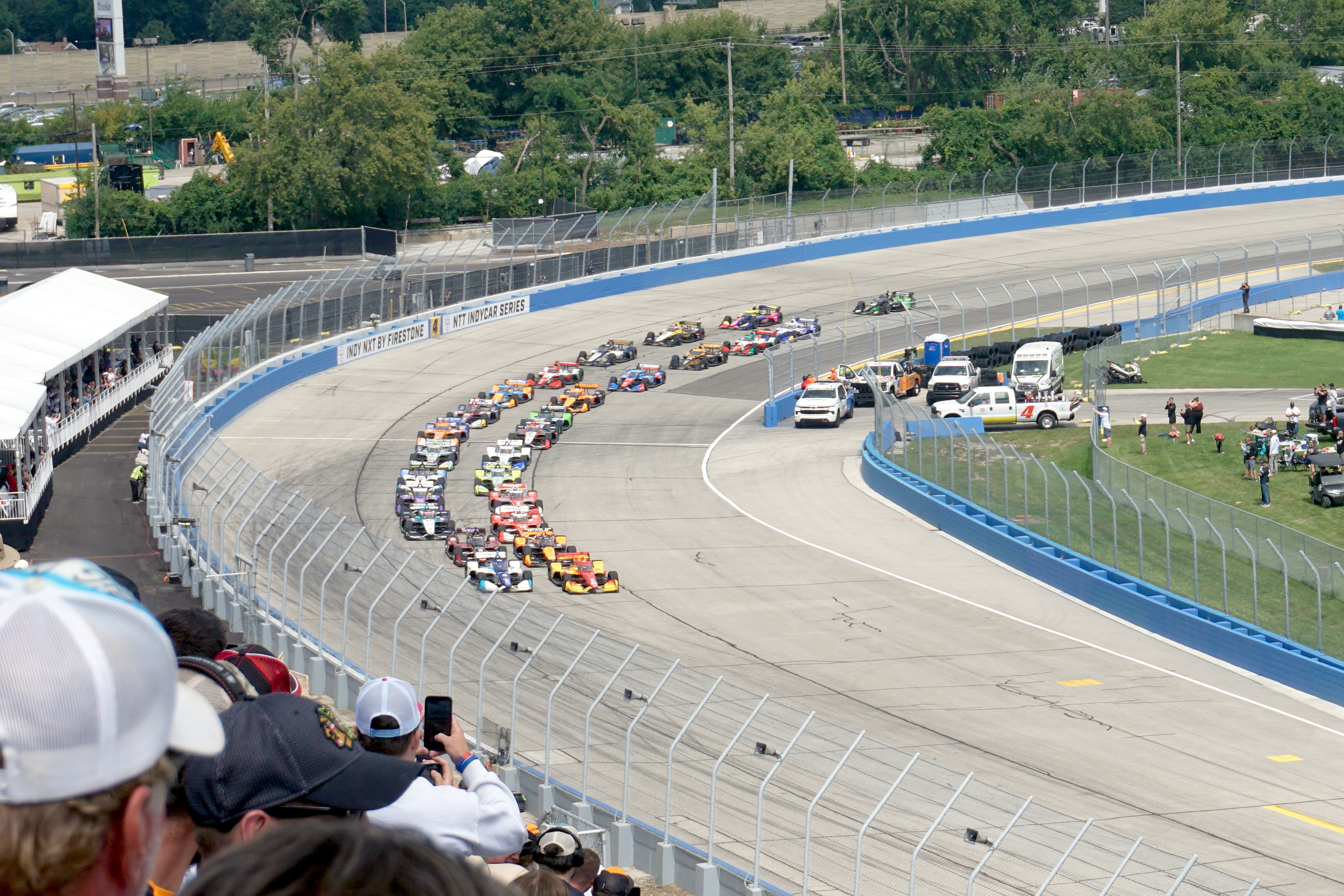
Start of the 2025 Snap-on Milwaukee Mile 250

Key	Meaning
R	Rookie
W	Past winner

No.	Driver	Team	Engine
2	(United States) Josef Newgarden	Team Penske	Chevrolet
3	(New Zealand) Scott McLaughlin W	Team Penske	Chevrolet
4	(United States) David Malukas	A.J. Foyt Enterprises	Chevrolet
5	(Mexico) Pato O'Ward W	Arrow McLaren	Chevrolet
6	(United States) Nolan Siegel R	Arrow McLaren	Chevrolet
7	(Denmark) Christian Lundgaard	Arrow McLaren	Chevrolet
8	(Cayman Islands) Kyffin Simpson	Chip Ganassi Racing	Honda
9	(New Zealand) Scott Dixon W	Chip Ganassi Racing	Honda
10	(Spain) Álex Palou	Chip Ganassi Racing	Honda
12	(Australia) Will Power W	Team Penske	Chevrolet
14	(United States) Santino Ferrucci	A.J. Foyt Enterprises	Chevrolet
15	(United States) Graham Rahal	Rahal Letterman Lanigan Racing	Honda
18	(Netherlands) Rinus VeeKay	Dale Coyne Racing	Honda
20	(United States) Alexander Rossi	Ed Carpenter Racing	Chevrolet
21	(Denmark) Christian Rasmussen	Ed Carpenter Racing	Chevrolet
26	(United States) Colton Herta	Andretti Global with Curb-Agajanian	Honda
27	(United States) Kyle Kirkwood	Andretti Global	Honda
28	(Sweden) Marcus Ericsson	Andretti Global	Honda
30	(Canada) Devlin DeFrancesco	Rahal Letterman Lanigan Racing	Honda
45	(United Kingdom) Louis Foster R	Rahal Letterman Lanigan Racing	Honda
50	(United States) Jacob Abel R	Dale Coyne Racing	Honda
60	(Sweden) Felix Rosenqvist	Meyer Shank Racing with Curb-Agajanian	Honda
66	(New Zealand) Marcus Armstrong	Meyer Shank Racing with Curb-Agajanian	Honda
76	(United States) Conor Daly	Juncos Hollinger Racing	Chevrolet
77	(United States) Sting Ray Robb	Juncos Hollinger Racing	Chevrolet
83	(Israel) Robert Shwartzman R	PREMA Racing	Chevrolet
90	(United Kingdom) Callum Ilott	PREMA Racing	Chevrolet

== Practice ==
=== Practice 1 ===
The first practice session was held on Saturday, August 23, at 8:00 AM CT.

Top Practice Speeds
Pos	No.	Driver	Team	Engine	Lap Time
1	2	(United States) Josef Newgarden	Team Penske	Chevrolet	00:22:6864
2	10	(Spain) Álex Palou	Chip Ganassi Racing	Honda	00:22:7601
3	76	(United States) Conor Daly	Juncos Hollinger Racing	Chevrolet	00:22:7754

== Qualifying ==
Qualifying was held on August 23, 2025, at 1:00 PM CT.

=== Qualifying classification ===
Pos	No.	Driver	Team	Engine	Time	Final grid
1	10	(Spain) Álex Palou	Chip Ganassi Racing	Honda	00:44:8422	1
2	4	(United States) David Malukas	A.J. Foyt Enterprises	Chevrolet	00:45:0400	2
3	5	(Mexico) Pato O'Ward W	Arrow McLaren	Chevrolet	00:45:0894	3
4	3	(New Zealand) Scott McLaughlin W	Team Penske	Chevrolet	00:45:1785	4
5	9	(New Zealand) Scott Dixon W	Chip Ganassi Racing	Honda	00:45:4052	14
6	12	(Australia) Will Power W	Team Penske	Chevrolet	00:45:4424	5
7	27	(United States) Kyle Kirkwood	Andretti Global	Honda	00:45:5745	6
8	2	(United States) Josef Newgarden	Team Penske	Chevrolet	00:45:5809	7
9	76	(United States) Conor Daly	Juncos Hollinger Racing	Chevrolet	00:45:6233	8
10	21	(Denmark) Christian Rasmussen	Ed Carpenter Racing	Chevrolet	00:45:6298	9
11	15	(United States) Graham Rahal	Rahal Letterman Lanigan Racing	Honda	00:45:6765	10
12	18	(Netherlands) Rinus VeeKay	Dale Coyne Racing	Honda	00:45:8143	11
13	20	(United States) Alexander Rossi	Ed Carpenter Racing	Chevrolet	00:45:8532	12
14	28	(Sweden) Marcus Ericsson	Andretti Global	Honda	00:45:9372	13
15	30	(Canada) Devlin DeFrancesco	Rahal Letterman Lanigan Racing	Honda	00:45:9486	15
16	66	(New Zealand) Marcus Armstrong	Meyer Shank Racing with Curb-Agajanian	Honda	00:45:9572	16
17	7	(Denmark) Christian Lundgaard	Arrow McLaren	Chevrolet	00:46:0198	17
18	6	(United States) Nolan Siegel R	Arrow McLaren	Chevrolet	00:46:1566	18
19	77	(United States) Sting Ray Robb	Juncos Hollinger Racing	Chevrolet	00:45:2084	19
20	8	(Cayman Islands) Kyffin Simpson	Chip Ganassi Racing	Honda	00:46:2147	26
21	83	(Israel) Robert Shwartzman R	PREMA Racing	Chevrolet	00:46:2501	20
22	45	(United Kingdom) Louis Foster R	Rahal Letterman Lanigan Racing	Honda	00:46:3914	27
23	14	(United States) Santino Ferrucci	A.J. Foyt Enterprises	Chevrolet	00:46:5887	21
24	50	(United States) Jacob Abel R	Dale Coyne Racing	Honda	00:46:6671	22
25	90	(United Kingdom) Callum Ilott	PREMA Racing	Chevrolet	00:46:7085	23
26	26	(United States) Colton Herta	Andretti Global with Curb-Agajanian	Honda	01:04:8350	24
27	60	(Sweden) Felix Rosenqvist	Meyer Shank Racing with Curb-Agajanian	Honda	No Time	25

Notes

- Scott Dixon, Kyffin Simpson, and Louis Foster each received a nine-spot grid penalty for an unapproved engine change.
- **Bold text** indicates fastest time.

== Final practice ==
The final practice session was held on Saturday, August 23, at 3:30 PM CT.

Top Practice Speeds
Pos	No.	Driver	Team	Engine	Lap Time
1	9	(New Zealand) Scott Dixon W	Chip Ganassi Racing	Honda	00:23:3167
2	4	(United States) David Malukas	A.J. Foyt Enterprises	Chevrolet	00:23:5938
3	6	(United States) Nolan Siegel R	Arrow McLaren	Chevrolet	00:23:6484

== Race ==
The race was held on August 24, 2025, at 1:00 PM CT.

=== Race classification ===
Pos	Start Pos	No.	Driver	Team	Engine	Laps	Laps Led	Pit Stops	Time/Retired	Pts.
1	9	21	(Denmark) Christian Rasmussen	Ed Carpenter Racing	Chevrolet	250	16	4	02:02:08.1735	51
2	1	10	(Spain) Álex Palou	Chip Ganassi Racing	Honda	250	199	4	02:02:10.1198	44
3	4	3	(New Zealand) Scott McLaughlin	Team Penske	Chevrolet	250	–	4	02:02:18.8346	35
4	12	20	(United States) Alexander Rossi	Ed Carpenter Racing	Chevrolet	250	–	5	02:02:19.6317	32
5	3	5	(Mexico) Pato O'Ward	Arrow McLaren	Chevrolet	250	–	5	02:02:20.2564	30
6	17	7	(Denmark) Christian Lundgaard	Arrow McLaren	Chevrolet	250	–	5	02:02:21.0022	28
7	7	2	(United States) Josef Newgarden	Team Penske	Chevrolet	250	–	4	02:02:22.5778	26
8	2	4	(United States) David Malukas	A.J. Foyt Enterprises	Chevrolet	250	25	5	02:02:23.2660	25
9	14	9	(New Zealand) Scott Dixon	Chip Ganassi Racing	Honda	250	–	5	02:02:23.8221	22
10	16	66	(New Zealand) Marcus Armstrong	Meyer Shank Racing with Curb-Agajanian	Honda	250	8	4	02:02:24.6191	21
11	24	26	(United States) Colton Herta	Andretti Global with Curb-Agajanian	Honda	250	–	5	02:02:24.9903	19
12	6	27	(United States) Kyle Kirkwood	Andretti Global	Honda	250	–	5	02:02:26.0550	18
13	8	76	(United States) Conor Daly	Juncos Hollinger Racing	Chevrolet	250	–	5	02:02:27.1944	17
14	21	14	(United States) Santino Ferrucci	A.J. Foyt Racing	Chevrolet	250	–	5	02:02:28.0338	16
15	11	18	(Netherlands) Rinus VeeKay	Dale Coyne Racing	Honda	250	–	5	02:02:28.3919	15
16	15	30	(Canada) Devlin DeFrancesco	Rahal Letterman Lanigan Racing	Honda	250	–	5	02:02:31.1689	14
17	27	45	(United Kingdom) Louis Foster	Rahal Letterman Lanigan Racing	Honda	249	1	5	02:02:08.8417	14
18	20	83	(Israel) Robert Shwartzman	PREMA Racing	Chevrolet	249	–	4	02:02:17.7622	12
19	13	28	(Sweden) Marcus Ericsson	Andretti Global	Honda	249	–	4	02:02:19.0937	11
20	26	8	(Cayman Islands) Kyffin Simpson	Chip Ganassi Racing	Honda	249	–	5	02:02:31.0458	10
21	22	50	(United States) Jacob Abel	Dale Coyne Racing	Honda	248	–	5	02:02:09.6193	9
22	25	60	(Sweden) Felix Rosenqvist	Meyer Shank Racing with Curb-Agajanian	Honda	248	1	5	02:02:11.2425	9
23	19	77	(United States) Sting Ray Robb	Juncos Hollinger Racing	Chevrolet	248	–	5	02:02:34.5198	7
24	10	15	(United States) Graham Rahal	Rahal Letterman Lanigan Racing	Honda	247	–	5	02:02:14.6791	6
25	23	90	(United Kingdom) Callum Ilott	PREMA Racing	Chevrolet	138	–	2	Mechanical	5
26	5	12	(Australia) Will Power	Team Penske	Chevrolet	102	–	2	Contact	5
27	18	6	(United States) Nolan Siegel	Arrow McLaren	Chevrolet	–	–	–	Contact	5
Fastest lap: (United States) David Malukas 00:23.1954

== Championship standings after the race ==
Drivers' Championship standings

	Pos.	Driver	Points
Unchanged	1	(Spain) Álex Palou	670
Unchanged	2	(Mexico) Pato O'Ward	505 (–165)
Unchanged	3	(New Zealand) Scott Dixon	433 (–237)
Unchanged	4	(Denmark) Christian Lundgaard	426 (–244)
Unchanged	5	(United States) Kyle Kirkwood	405 (–265)

Engine manufacturer standings

	Pos.	Manufacturer	Points
Unchanged	1	Honda	1468
Unchanged	2	Chevrolet	1252 (–216)

- Note: Only the top five positions are included.

Previous race: 2025 BitNile.com Grand Prix of Portland	NTT IndyCar Series; 2025 season	Next race: 2025 Borchetta Bourbon Music City Grand Prix
Previous race: 2024 Hy-Vee Milwaukee Mile 250s	IndyCar Series at the Milwaukee Mile	Next race: 2026 Snap-on Milwaukee Mile 250
