= 2025 XPEL Grand Prix at Road America =

Indycar race held in Elkhart Lake, Wisconsin

(United States) 2025 XPEL Grand Prix at Road America
Race details
9th round of the 2025 IndyCar season
← Previous race	Next race →
- Layout of the Road America circuit
- Date: June 22, 2025
- Official name: Grand Prix at Road America
- Location: Road America, Elkhart Lake, Wisconsin
- Course: Permanent road course 4.014 mi / 6.460 km
- Distance: 55 laps 220.55 mi / 354.94 km

Pole position
- Driver: (United Kingdom) Louis Foster (Rahal Letterman Lanigan Racing)
- Time: 01:44.5141

Fastest lap
- Driver: (Sweden) Felix Rosenqvist (Meyer Shank Racing)
- Time: 01:46.7814 (on lap 55 of 55)

Podium
- First: (Spain) Álex Palou (Chip Ganassi Racing)
- Second: (Sweden) Felix Rosenqvist (Meyer Shank Racing)
- Third: (United States) Santino Ferrucci (A. J. Foyt Racing)

Chronology
Previous	Next
2024	2026

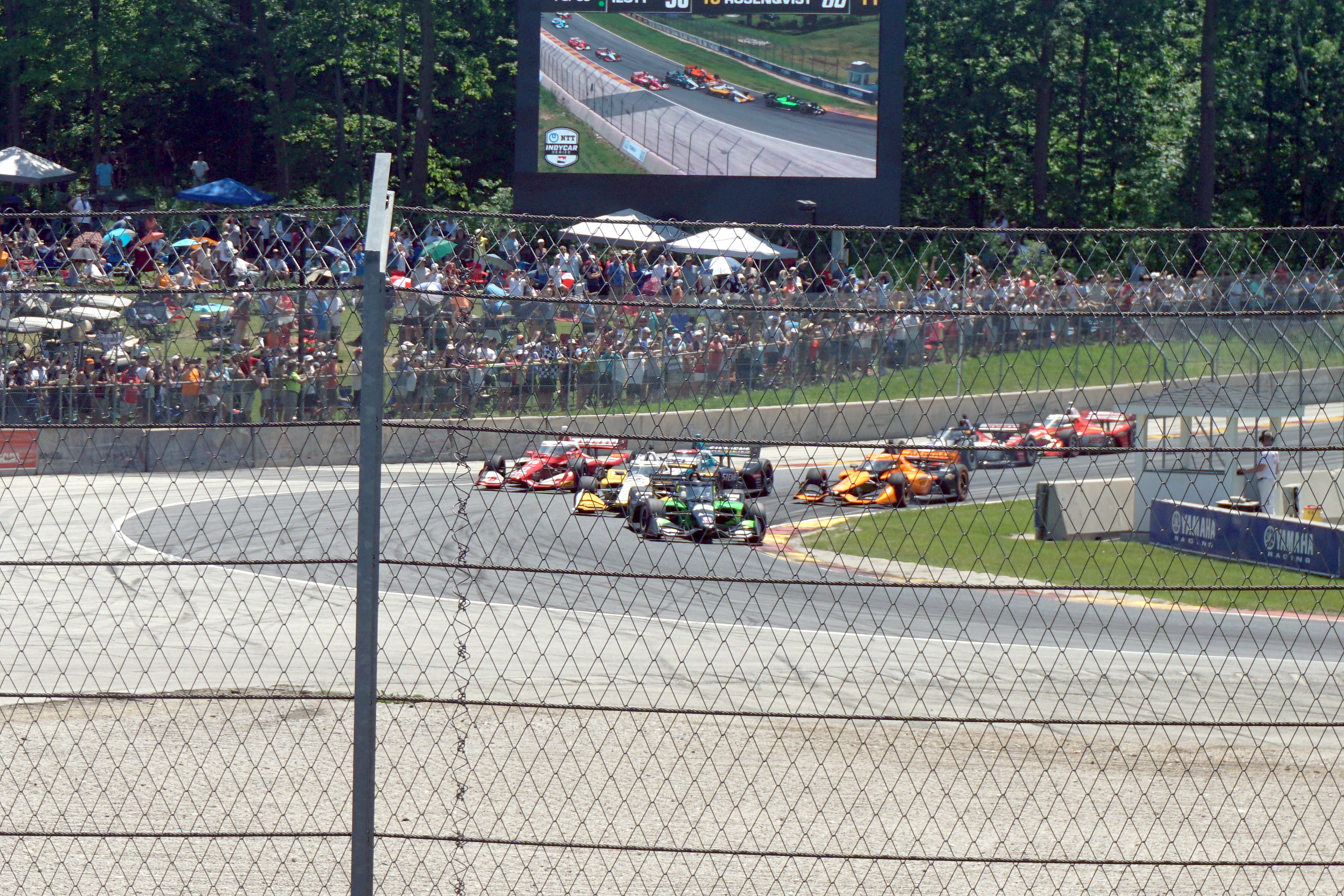
In-race action

The 2025 XPEL Grand Prix at Road America was the ninth round of the 2025 IndyCar season. The race was held on June 22, 2025, in Elkhart Lake, Wisconsin at Road America. The race was contested of 55 laps. Álex Palou won the race, Felix Rosenqvist finished 2nd, and Santino Ferrucci finished 3rd. Kyle Kirkwood and Marcus Armstrong rounded out the top five, while Kyffin Simpson, David Malukas, Nolan Siegel, Scott Dixon, and Rinus VeeKay rounded out the top ten.

== Entry list ==
Key	Meaning
R	Rookie
W	Past winner

No.	Driver	Team	Engine
2	(United States) Josef Newgarden W	Team Penske	Chevrolet
3	(New Zealand) Scott McLaughlin	Team Penske	Chevrolet
4	(United States) David Malukas	A. J. Foyt Racing	Chevrolet
5	(Mexico) Pato O'Ward	Arrow McLaren	Chevrolet
6	(United States) Nolan Siegel R	Arrow McLaren	Chevrolet
7	(Denmark) Christian Lundgaard	Arrow McLaren	Chevrolet
8	(Cayman Islands) Kyffin Simpson	Chip Ganassi Racing	Honda
9	(New Zealand) Scott Dixon W	Chip Ganassi Racing	Honda
10	(Spain) Álex Palou W	Chip Ganassi Racing	Honda
12	(Australia) Will Power W	Team Penske	Chevrolet
14	(United States) Santino Ferrucci	A. J. Foyt Racing	Chevrolet
15	(United States) Graham Rahal	Rahal Letterman Lanigan Racing	Honda
18	(Netherlands) Rinus VeeKay	Dale Coyne Racing	Honda
20	(United States) Alexander Rossi W	ECR	Chevrolet
21	(Denmark) Christian Rasmussen	ECR	Chevrolet
26	(United States) Colton Herta	Andretti Global with Curb-Agajanian	Honda
27	(United States) Kyle Kirkwood	Andretti Global	Honda
28	(Sweden) Marcus Ericsson	Andretti Global	Honda
30	(Canada) Devlin DeFrancesco	Rahal Letterman Lanigan Racing	Honda
45	(United Kingdom) Louis Foster R	Rahal Letterman Lanigan Racing	Honda
51	(United States) Jacob Abel R	Dale Coyne Racing	Honda
60	(Sweden) Felix Rosenqvist W	Meyer Shank Racing	Honda
66	(New Zealand) Marcus Armstrong	Meyer Shank Racing	Honda
76	(United States) Conor Daly	Juncos Hollinger Racing	Chevrolet
77	(United States) Sting Ray Robb	Juncos Hollinger Racing	Chevrolet
83	(Israel) Robert Shwartzman R	Prema Racing	Chevrolet
90	(United Kingdom) Callum Ilott	Prema Racing	Chevrolet

== Practice ==
=== Practice 1 ===
The first practice session was held on Friday, June 20, at 3:30 PM CT, and lasted for 75 minutes. Kyle Kirkwood, driving for Andretti Global, set the fastest lap in the session with a lap of 1:44.9881 and a speed of 137.638 mph (221.507 km/h). The session was stopped twice for incidents involving Santino Ferrucci and Alexander Rossi, though neither driver was injured.

Top Practice Speeds
Pos	No.	Driver	Team	Engine	Lap Time
1	27	(United States) Kyle Kirkwood	Andretti Global	Honda	1:44.9881
2	30	(Canada) Devlin DeFrancesco	Rahal Letterman Lanigan Racing	Honda	1:45.1414
3	12	(Australia) Will Power W	Team Penske	Chevrolet	1:45.1795
First practice results

=== Practice 2 ===
The second and final practice session was held on Saturday, June 21, at 10:00 AM CT, and would last for 75 minutes. Christian Lundgaard, driving for Arrow McLaren, set the fastest lap in the session with a lap of 01:45.3412 and a speed of 137.177 mph (220.480 km/h).

Top Practice Speeds
Pos	No.	Driver	Team	Engine	Lap Time
1	7	(Denmark) Christian Lundgaard	Arrow McLaren	Chevrolet	01:45.3412
2	10	(Spain) Álex Palou W	Chip Ganassi Racing	Honda	01:45.5916
3	12	(Australia) Will Power W	Team Penske	Chevrolet	1:45.6809
Second practice results

== Qualifying ==
Qualifying was held at 1:30 PM CT on June 21, 2025. Rookie Louis Foster, driving for Rahal Letterman Lanigan Racing, would earn his first career pole position, with a time of 01:44.5141, and a speed of 138.263 mph (222.089 km/h). Joining Foster on the front-row would be Álex Palou of Chip Ganassi Racing.

=== Qualifying classification ===
Pos	No.	Driver	Team	Engine	Time	Final grid							
Pos	No.	Driver	Team	Engine	Time	Final grid	1	45	(United Kingdom) Louis Foster R	Rahal Letterman Lanigan Racing	Honda	01:44.5141	1
Pos	No.	Driver	Team	Engine	2	Final grid	10	(Spain) Álex Palou W	Chip Ganassi Racing	Honda	01:44.6300	2	
3	27	(United States) Kyle Kirkwood	Andretti Global	Honda	01:44.8523	3							
4	3	(New Zealand) Scott McLaughlin	Team Penske	Chevrolet	01:45.0137	4							
5	7	(Denmark) Christian Lundgaard	Arrow McLaren	Chevrolet	01:45.0828	5							
6	15	(United States) Graham Rahal	Rahal Letterman Lanigan Racing	Honda	01:45.4877	6							
7	4	(United States) David Malukas	A. J. Foyt Racing	Chevrolet	01:45.0906	7							
8	12	(New Zealand) Will Power W	Team Penske	Chevrolet	01:45.1220	8							
9	90	(United Kingdom) Callum Ilott	Prema Racing	Chevrolet	01:45.2532	9							
10	2	(United States) Josef Newgarden W	Team Penske	Chevrolet	01:45.2834	10							
11	5	(Mexico) Pato O'Ward	Arrow McLaren	Chevrolet	01:45.3704	11							
12	60	(Sweden) Felix Rosenqvist W	Meyer Shank Racing	Honda	01:45.4532	12							
13	6	(United States) Nolan Siegel	Arrow McLaren	Chevrolet	01:45.0722	13							
14	28	(Sweden) Marcus Ericsson	Andretti Global	Honda	01:45.1984	14							
15	66	(New Zealand) Marcus Armstrong	Meyer Shank Racing	Honda	01:45.2288	15							
16	26	(United States) Colton Herta	Andretti Global with Curb-Agajanian	Honda	01:45.2235	16							
17	83	(Israel) Robert Shwartzman R	Prema Racing	Chevrolet	01:45.3051	17							
18	14	(United States) Santino Ferrucci	A. J. Foyt Racing	Chevrolet	01:45.2816	18							
19	30	(Canada) Devlin DeFrancesco	Rahal Letterman Lanigan Racing	Honda	01:45.3317	19							
20	21	(Denmark) Christian Rasmussen	ECR	Chevrolet	01:45.4283	20							
21	76	(United States) Conor Daly	Juncos Hollinger Racing	Chevrolet	01:45.3526	21							
22	18	(Netherlands) Rinus VeeKay	Dale Coyne Racing	Honda	01:45.5780	22							
23	8	(Cayman Islands) Kyffin Simpson	Chip Ganassi Racing	Honda	01:45.3673	23							
24	20	(United States) Alexander Rossi W	ECR	Chevrolet	01:45.6771	24							
25	9	(New Zealand) Scott Dixon W	Chip Ganassi Racing	Honda	01:46.6468	25							
26	77	(United States) Sting Ray Robb	Juncos Hollinger Racing	Chevrolet	01:46.0251	26							
27	51	(United States) Jacob Abel R	Dale Coyne Racing	Honda	01:46.3837	27							
Qualifying results

Notes

- **Bold text** indicates fastest time.

== Warmup ==
The warmup was held at 9:00 AM CT on June 22, 2025. Felix Rosenqvist, driving for Meyer Shank Racing, set the fastest lap in the session with a lap of 01:45.0725 and a speed of 137.528 mph (221.320 km/h).

Top Practice Speeds
Pos	No.	Driver	Team	Engine	Lap Time
1	60	(Sweden) Felix Rosenqvist W	Meyer Shank Racing	Honda	01:45.0725
2	9	(New Zealand) Scott Dixon W	Chip Ganassi Racing	Honda	01:45.1517
3	14	(United States) Santino Ferrucci	A. J. Foyt Racing	Chevrolet	01:45.2402
Warmup results

== Race ==
The race was held at 12:30 PM CT on June 22, 2025. Álex Palou, driving for Chip Ganassi Racing, would earn his 3rd-career win in the race and sixth of the year.

=== Race classification ===
Pos	No.	Driver	Team	Engine	Laps	Time/Retired	Pit Stops	Grid	Laps Led	Pts.
1	10	(Spain) Álex Palou W	Chip Ganassi Racing	Honda	55	01:53:30.5917	3	2	6	51
2	60	(Sweden) Felix Rosenqvist W	Meyer Shank Racing	Honda	55	+2.1725	3	12	2	41
3	14	(United States) Santino Ferrucci	A. J. Foyt Racing	Chevrolet	55	+17.9663	3	18	0	35
4	27	(United States) Kyle Kirkwood	Andretti Global	Honda	55	+19.1852	3	3	1	33
5	66	(New Zealand) Marcus Armstrong	Meyer Shank Racing	Honda	55	+19.6079	4	15	0	30
6	8	(Cayman Islands) Kyffin Simpson	Chip Ganassi Racing	Honda	55	+21.1658	4	23	2	29
7	4	(United States) David Malukas	A. J. Foyt Racing	Chevrolet	55	+21.8948	5	7	2	27
8	6	(United States) Nolan Siegel R	Arrow McLaren	Chevrolet	55	+23.1972	5	13	0	24
9	9	(New Zealand) Scott Dixon W	Chip Ganassi Racing	Honda	55	+29.4093	4	25	27	25
10	18	(Netherlands) Rinus VeeKay	Dale Coyne Racing	Honda	55	+32.0757	3	22	0	20
11	45	(United Kingdom) Louis Foster R	Rahal Letterman Lanigan Racing	Honda	55	+37.0617	3	1	3	21
12	3	(New Zealand) Scott McLaughlin	Team Penske	Chevrolet	55	+41.4421	3	4	8	19
13	20	(United States) Alexander Rossi W	ECR	Chevrolet	55	+42.3919	5	24	0	17
14	12	(Australia) Will Power W	Team Penske	Chevrolet	55	+43.0989	3	8	0	16
15	90	(United Kingdom) Callum Ilott	Prema Racing	Chevrolet	55	+43.1800	3	9	0	15
16	26	(United States) Colton Herta	Andretti Global with Curb-Agajanian	Honda	55	+43.7525	3	16	0	14
17	5	(Mexico) Pato O'Ward	Arrow McLaren	Chevrolet	55	+44.3313	4	11	0	13
18	21	(Denmark) Christian Rasmussen	ECR	Chevrolet	55	+45.1138	4	20	0	12
19	30	(Canada) Devlin DeFrancesco	Rahal Letterman Lanigan Racing	Honda	55	+46.5774	5	19	0	11
20	15	(United States) Graham Rahal	Rahal Letterman Lanigan Racing	Honda	55	+47.0728	3	6	0	10
21	28	(Sweden) Marcus Ericsson	Andretti Global	Honda	55	+47.6079	3	14	0	9
22	76	(United States) Conor Daly	Juncos Hollinger Racing	Chevrolet	55	+01:04.181	7	21	0	8
23	51	(United States) Jacob Abel R	Dale Coyne Racing	Honda	55	+01:26.119	4	27	0	7
24	7	(Denmark) Christian Lundgaard	Arrow McLaren	Chevrolet	55	+01:29.403	4	5	4	7
25	2	(United States) Josef Newgarden W	Team Penske	Chevrolet	30	Contact	2	10	0	5
26	77	(United States) Sting Ray Robb	Juncos Hollinger Racing	Chevrolet	9	Contact	1	26	0	5
27	83	(Israel) Robert Shwartzman R	Prema Racing	Chevrolet	3	Contact	0	17	0	5
Fastest lap: (Sweden) Felix Rosenqvist (Meyer Shank Racing) – 01:46.7814 (lap 55)
Official race results

== Championship standings after the race ==
Drivers' Championship standings

	Pos.	Driver	Points
Unchanged	1	(Spain) Álex Palou	386
Unchanged	2	(United States) Kyle Kirkwood	293 (–93)
Unchanged	3	(Mexico) Pato O'Ward	275 (–111)
Unchanged	4	(New Zealand) Scott Dixon	231 (–155)
Unchanged	5	(Sweden) Felix Rosenqvist	231 (–155)

Engine manufacturer standings

	Pos.	Manufacturer	Points
Unchanged	1	Honda	819
Unchanged	2	Chevrolet	636 (–183)

- Note: Only the top five positions are included.

Previous race: 2025 Bommarito Automotive Group 500	NTT IndyCar Series; 2025 season	Next race: 2025 Honda Indy 200
Previous race: 2024 XPEL Grand Prix at Road America	Grand Prix of Road America	Next race: 2026 XPEL Grand Prix at Road America
