= 2025 Borchetta Bourbon Music City Grand Prix =

17th race of the 2025 IndyCar Series

(United States) 2025 Borchetta Bourbon Music City Grand Prix
Race details
17th round of the 2025 IndyCar season
← Previous race
- Layout of the Nashville Superspeedway circuit
- Date: August 31, 2025
- Official name: Borchetta Bourbon Music City Grand Prix
- Location: Nashville Superspeedway, Lebanon, Tennessee
- Course: Superspeedway; 1.330 mi / 2.140 km
- Distance: 225 laps 299.25 mi / 481.5 km

Pole position
- Driver: (Mexico) Pato O'Ward (Arrow McLaren)
- Time: 00:47.2607

Fastest lap
- Driver: (Spain) Álex Palou (Chip Ganassi Racing)
- Time: 00:24.1369 (on lap 184 of 225)

Podium
- First: (United States) Josef Newgarden (Team Penske)
- Second: (Spain) Álex Palou (Chip Ganassi Racing)
- Third: (New Zealand) Scott McLaughlin (Team Penske)

Chronology
Previous	Next
2024	2026

The 2025 Borchetta Bourbon Music City Grand Prix was the seventeenth and final round of the 2025 IndyCar season. The race was held on August 31, 2025, in Lebanon, Tennessee at the Nashville Superspeedway. Due to construction of New Nissan Stadium, this was the second consecutive year that the race was held at the Superspeedway, The race was contested of 225 laps. Josef Newgarden won the race, Álex Palou finished 2nd, and Scott McLaughlin finished 3rd. Kyffin Simpson and Conor Daly rounded out the top five, while Kyle Kirkwood, Felix Rosenqvist, Santino Ferrucci, Callum Ilott, and Alexander Rossi rounded out the top ten.

== Entry list ==
Key	Meaning
R	Rookie
W	Past winner

No.	Driver	Team	Engine
2	(United States) Josef Newgarden	Team Penske	Chevrolet
3	(New Zealand) Scott McLaughlin	Team Penske	Chevrolet
4	(United States) David Malukas	A.J. Foyt Enterprises	Chevrolet
5	(Mexico) Pato O'Ward	Arrow McLaren	Chevrolet
6	(United States) Nolan Siegel R	Arrow McLaren	Chevrolet
7	(Denmark) Christian Lundgaard	Arrow McLaren	Chevrolet
8	(Cayman Islands) Kyffin Simpson	Chip Ganassi Racing	Honda
9	(New Zealand) Scott Dixon W	Chip Ganassi Racing	Honda
10	(Spain) Álex Palou	Chip Ganassi Racing	Honda
12	(Australia) Will Power	Team Penske	Chevrolet
14	(United States) Santino Ferrucci	A.J. Foyt Enterprises	Chevrolet
15	(United States) Graham Rahal	Rahal Letterman Lanigan Racing	Honda
18	(Netherlands) Rinus VeeKay	Dale Coyne Racing	Honda
20	(United States) Alexander Rossi	Ed Carpenter Racing	Chevrolet
21	(Denmark) Christian Rasmussen	Ed Carpenter Racing	Chevrolet
26	(United States) Colton Herta W	Andretti Global with Curb-Agajanian	Honda
27	(United States) Kyle Kirkwood	Andretti Global	Honda
28	(Sweden) Marcus Ericsson	Andretti Global	Honda
30	(Canada) Devlin DeFrancesco	Rahal Letterman Lanigan Racing	Honda
45	(United Kingdom) Louis Foster R	Rahal Letterman Lanigan Racing	Honda
51	(United States) Jacob Abel R	Dale Coyne Racing	Honda
60	(Sweden) Felix Rosenqvist	Meyer Shank Racing with Curb-Agajanian	Honda
66	(New Zealand) Marcus Armstrong	Meyer Shank Racing with Curb-Agajanian	Honda
76	(United States) Conor Daly	Juncos Hollinger Racing	Chevrolet
77	(United States) Sting Ray Robb	Juncos Hollinger Racing	Chevrolet
83	(Israel) Robert Shwartzman R	PREMA Racing	Chevrolet
90	(United Kingdom) Callum Ilott	PREMA Racing	Chevrolet

== Practice ==
The first practice session was held on Saturday, August 30, at 9:30 AM CT.

Top Practice Speeds
Pos	No.	Driver	Team	Engine	Lap Time
1	5	(Mexico) Pato O'Ward	Arrow McLaren	Chevrolet	00:23.6612
2	27	(United States) Kyle Kirkwood	Andretti Global	Honda	00:23.7059
3	7	(Denmark) Christian Lundgaard	Arrow McLaren	Chevrolet	00:23.7447

== Qualifying ==
Qualifying was held on August 30, 2025, at 1:00 PM CT.

=== Qualifying classification ===
Pos	No.	Driver	Team	Engine	Time	Final grid
1	5	(Mexico) Pato O'Ward	Arrow McLaren	Chevrolet	00:47.2607	1
2	4	(United States) David Malukas	A J. Foyt Enterprises	Chevrolet	00:47.4243	2
3	7	(Denmark) Christian Lundgaard	Arrow McLaren	Chevrolet	00:47.4734	3
4	10	(Spain) Álex Palou	Chip Ganassi Racing	Honda	00:47.4994	4
5	9	(New Zealand) Scott Dixon	Chip Ganassi Racing	Honda	00:47.5384	5
6	2	(United States) Josef Newgarden	Team Penske	Chevrolet	00:47.5495	6
7	6	(United States) Nolan Siegel	Arrow McLaren	Chevrolet	00:47.5531	16
8	3	(New Zealand) Scott McLaughlin	Team Penske	Chevrolet	00:47.6334	7
9	90	(United Kingdom) Callum Ilott	PREMA Racing	Chevrolet	00:47.6841	18
10	8	(Cayman Islands) Kyffin Simpson	Chip Ganassi Racing	Honda	00:47.7123	8
11	60	(Sweden) Felix Rosenqvist	Meyer Shank Racing with Curb-Agajanian	Honda	00:47.7139	9
12	12	(Australia) Will Power	Team Penske	Chevrolet	00:47.7272	10
13	27	(United States) Kyle Kirkwood	Andretti Global	Honda	00:47.7624	11
14	14	(United States) Santino Ferrucci	A.J. Foyt Enterprises	Chevrolet	00:47.7755	12
15	26	(United States) Colton Herta	Andretti Global with Curb-Agajanian	Honda	00:47.8115	13
16	21	(Denmark) Christian Rasmussen	Ed Carpenter Racing	Chevrolet	00:47.8784	25
17	66	(New Zealand) Marcus Armstrong	Meyer Shank Racing with Curb-Agajanian	Honda	00:47.8853	14
18	28	(Sweden) Marcus Ericsson	Andretti Global	Honda	00:47.9130	15
19	83	(Israel) Robert Shwartzman	PREMA Racing	Chevrolet	00:47.9889	17
20	20	(United States) Alexander Rossi	Ed Carpenter Racing	Chevrolet	00:48.0213	19
21	77	(United States) Sting Ray Robb	Juncos Hollinger Racing	Chevrolet	00:48.1118	20
22	15	(United States) Graham Rahal	Rahal Letterman Lanigan Racing	Honda	00:48.2061	21
23	30	(Canada) Devlin DeFrancesco	Rahal Letterman Lanigan Racing	Honda	00:48.2188	22
24	45	(United Kingdom) Louis Foster	Rahal Letterman Lanigan Racing	Honda	00:48.2195	23
25	76	(United States) Conor Daly	Juncos Hollinger Racing	Chevrolet	00:48.3181	24
26	18	(Netherlands) Rinus VeeKay	Dale Coyne Racing	Honda	00:48.5238	26
27	51	(United States) Jacob Abel	Dale Coyne Racing	Honda	00:48.9122	27

Notes

Cars 6, 21, and 90 were penalized 9 grid positions.

== Final practice ==
The final practice session was held on Saturday, August 30, at 4:30 PM CT.

Top Practice Speeds
Pos	No.	Driver	Team	Engine	Lap Time
1	9	(New Zealand) Scott Dixon	Chip Ganassi Racing	Honda	00:24.0895
2	2	(United States) Josef Newgarden	Team Penske	Chevrolet	00:24.1250
3	66	(New Zealand) Marcus Armstrong	Meyer Shank Racing with Curb-Agajanian	Chevrolet	00:24.1296

== Race ==
The race was held on August 31, 2025, at 1:00 PM CT.

=== Race classification ===
Pos	Start Pos	No.	Driver	Team	Engine	Laps	Laps Led	Pit Stops	Time/Retired	Pts.
1	6	2	(United States) Josef Newgarden	Team Penske	Chevrolet	225	60	4	01:54:50.6727	51
2	4	10	(Spain) Álex Palou	Chip Ganassi Racing	Honda	225	11	4	01:54:51.1748	41
3	7	3	(New Zealand) Scott McLaughlin	Team Penske	Chevrolet	225	7	4	01:54:51.4030	36
4	8	8	(Cayman Islands) Kyffin Simpson	Chip Ganassi Racing	Honda	225	–	4	01:54:51.6480	32
5	24	76	(United States) Conor Daly	Juncos Hollinger Racing	Chevrolet	225	2	4	01:54:52.9191	31
6	11	27	(United States) Kyle Kirkwood	Andretti Global	Honda	225	–	4	01:54:53.3805	28
7	9	60	(Sweden) Felix Rosenqvist	Meyer Shank Racing with Curb-Agajanian	Honda	225	–	4	01:54:53.9970	26
8	12	14	(United States) Santino Ferrucci	A.J. Foyt Enterprises	Chevrolet	225	–	4	01:54:54.7552	24
9	18	90	(United Kingdom) Callum Ilott	PREMA Racing	Chevrolet	225	–	5	01:54:56.1356	22
10	19	20	(United States) Alexander Rossi	Ed Carpenter Racing	Chevrolet	225	16	5	01:54:57.8861	21
11	13	26	(United States) Colton Herta	Andretti Global with Curb-Agajanian	Honda	225	3	5	01:54:58.5068	20
12	5	9	(New Zealand) Scott Dixon	Chip Ganassi Racing	Honda	225	1	5	01:54:59.1382	19
13	26	18	(Netherlands) Rinus VeeKay	Dale Coyne Racing	Honda	225	2	5	01:54:59.6483	18
14	17	83	(Israel) Robert Shwartzman	PREMA Racing	Chevrolet	224	–	4	01:54:57.3910	16
15	15	28	(Sweden) Marcus Ericsson	Andretti Global	Honda	224	–	4	01:55:00.0004	15
16	20	77	(United States) Sting Ray Robb	Juncos Hollinger Racing	Chevrolet	224	–	4	01:55:00.3255	14
17	16	6	(United States) Nolan Siegel	Arrow McLaren	Chevrolet	224	–	5	01:55:00.9229	13
18	22	30	(Canada) Devlin DeFrancesco	Rahal Letterman Lanigan Racing	Honda	224	–	5	01:55:01.2523	12
19	14	66	(New Zealand) Marcus Armstrong	Meyer Shank Racing with Curb-Agajanian	Honda	224	1	5	01:55:16.3704	12
20	23	45	(United Kingdom) Louis Foster	Rahal Letterman Lanigan Racing	Honda	223	–	4	01:55:14.0061	10
21	10	12	(Australia) Will Power	Team Penske	Chevrolet	222	5	5	01:55:02.8309	10
22	21	15	(United States) Graham Rahal	Rahal Letterman Lanigan Racing	Honda	220	–	5	01:55:07.3476	8
23	27	51	(United States) Jacob Abel	Dale Coyne Racing	Honda	215	–	5	Retired	7
24	1	5	(Mexico) Pato O'Ward	Arrow McLaren	Chevrolet	126	116	2	Contact	10
25	3	7	(Denmark) Christian Lundgaard	Arrow McLaren	Chevrolet	123	–	2	Mechanical	5
26	2	4	(United States) David Malukas	A.J. Foyt Enterprises	Chevrolet	82	1	1	Contact	6
27	25	21	(Denmark) Christian Rasmussen	Ed Carpenter Racing	Chevrolet	–	–	–	Contact	5

== Championship standings after the race ==
Drivers' Championship standings

	Pos.	Driver	Points
Unchanged	1	(Spain) Álex Palou	711
Unchanged	2	(Mexico) Pato O'Ward	515 (–196)
Unchanged	3	(New Zealand) Scott Dixon	452 (–259)
Plus	4	(United States) Kyle Kirkwood	433 (–278)
Minus	5	(Denmark) Christian Lundgaard	431 (–280)

- Note: Only the top five positions are included.

Engine manufacturer standings

	Pos.	Manufacturer	Points
Unchanged	1	Honda	1550
Unchanged	2	Chevrolet	1328 (–222)

Previous race: 2025 Snap-on Milwaukee Mile 250	NTT IndyCar Series; 2025 season	Next race: 2026 Firestone Grand Prix of St. Petersburg
Previous race: 2024 Big Machine Music City Grand Prix	IndyCar Series at Nashville Superspeedway	Next race: 2026 Borchetta Bourbon Music City Grand Prix
