= Jay Frye =

American motorsports executive (born 1965)

- Born: Jay R. Frye; February 18, 1965 (age 61); Rock Island, Illinois, U.S.
- Occupation: Businessman
- Spouse: Danielle
- Children: 2

Jay R. Frye (born February 18, 1965) is an American motorsports executive currently serving as the president of Rahal Letterman Lanigan Racing. He formerly served as the president of IndyCar until early 2025. Frye previously was Team Director for two NASCAR teams, MB2 Motorsports and Red Bull Racing Team.

== Early life ==
Frye was born in Rock Island, Illinois to parents Jerry and Joyce. He has one sister, Julia, four years younger than him.

As a child, Frye's family owned a garbage trucking company. Frye attended the University of Missouri on a football scholarship and played tight end and offensive tackle on the football team.

After graduating, Frye was employed at Anheuser-Busch as a special-event manager in Chicago.

In late 1991, Frye went to work for Valvoline, as running their motorsports sponsorship program for NASCAR and the World of Outlaws. Working with driver Mark Martin and Roush Racing, the Valvoline sponsorship received the most television exposure according to sponsor reports. He also was instrumental in establishing a relationship between Valvoline and Hendrick Motorsports.

== MB2 Motorsports ==
When the Mars Company approached Hendrick Motorsports about sponsoring a new team, owner Rick Hendrick was uninterested in expansion, but suggested Mars contact Frye about establishing a team. Setting up an ownership group consisting of Read Morton, Tom Beard, and Nelson Bowers, Frye served as General Manager of the team.

In the Skittles racing team's first season of existence in 1997, driver Derrike Cope finished 27th in the final points standings.

In 1998, 15-time race winner Ernie Irvan took over as driver for the team. Irvan won three pole positions, including the Brickyard 400. Irvan retired after sustaining a concussion in August 1999. Between 2000 and 2002, Ken Schrader drove the #36 M&M's car.

In August 2000, Frye oversaw MB2 purchasing Tyler Jet Motorsports and expanding to two teams with driver Johnny Benson Jr. Frye attracted Valvoline to sponsor the team. In October 2002, Benson won at Rockingham Speedway to earn the team's first NASCAR Cup Series victory.

In July 2006, real-estate developer Bobby Ginn purchased 80% of the team, with Frye owning 20%, and the team was renamed Ginn Racing. Amid financial troubles, on July 25, 2007, Ginn Racing announced it had merged with Dale Earnhardt, Inc., effectively ending the team's existence.

== Red Bull Racing Team ==
In late 2007, Frye went to work for Red Bull Racing Team as they began to establish a NASCAR presence. Before Frye arrived, the team struggled severely with drivers A. J. Allmendinger and Brian Vickers. Allmendinger's team had a forty-third-place finish in the final owners' standings and had 19 DNQ's. Vickers failed to qualify for 13 races and ended the season with a 38th owners' standings position.

Under Frye's leadership, Vickers improved to finish 19th in points in 2008. Frye was named NASCAR Executive of the Year by ESPN and the Kansas City Star. In 2009, Vickers scored the first Cup Series win for the team at Michigan International Speedway and made the NASCAR playoffs, finishing 12th in points. For the 2011 season, Kasey Kahne became a full-time driver for the team, driving car No. 4 (formerly No. 82), and Vickers returned to drive the No. 83 car. On June 20, 2011, the Associated Press reported that Red Bull was planning to leave NASCAR at the end of the season. The team's on-track struggles, combined with a lackluster outreach to the 18–34 demographic, forced their departure. Despite this, Kahne scored the team's final victory at the November race at Phoenix, while Vickers struggled for most of the year, resulting in a 25th-place points finish. Kahne finished the season in 14th.

For 2012, Frye joined Hendrick Motorsports as an executive on business development.

== IndyCar ==
In November 2013, Frye became the chief revenue officer of Hulman Motorsports, which comprised the IndyCar Series and the Indianapolis Motor Speedway. Two years later, he was named as IndyCar President of competition and operations. In December 2018, he was promoted to President of IndyCar. Under his leadership, Frye oversaw the elimination of manufacture-specific aerokits in 2018, the introduction of a driver-protecting aeroscreen in 2020, and the introduction of hybrid technology in 2024.

In February 2025, Frye left IndyCar after 10 years with the organization.

== Rahal Letterman Lanigan Racing ==
On April 1, 2025, Frye was announced as the president of IndyCar and IMSA team Rahal Letterman Lanigan Racing.

== Personal life ==
Frye is married to his wife, Danielle. Danielle has an extensive background in motorsports, having worked as a publicist for Bill Elliott and Dale Jarrett in the 1990s. She currently serves as director of USAC's quarter-midget circuit, which partnered with NASCAR to create the NASCAR Youth Series. The couple has two daughters.
