= 2026 Borchetta Bourbon Music City Grand Prix =

IndyCar race held in Lebanon, Tennessee

(United States) 2026 Borchetta Bourbon Music City Grand Prix presented by OnlyBulls
Race details
12th round of the 2026 IndyCar season
← Previous race	Next race →
- Layout of the Nashville Superspeedway circuit
- Date: July 20 (Note: The race was originally scheduled on Sunday, July 19 at 5:30 p.m., before being postponed to Monday, July 20 at 3:00 p.m. due to excessive rainfall. The race was also shortened from 300 laps to 225 due to extreme heat conditions.), 2026
- Official name: Borchetta Bourbon Music City Grand Prix
- Location: Nashville Superspeedway, Lebanon, Tennessee
- Course: Superspeedway; 1.330 mi / 2.140 km
- Distance: 225 laps 299.25 mi / 642.13 km
- Scheduled Distance: 300 laps 399.9 mi / 481.49 km

Pole position
- Driver: (United States) Kyle Kirkwood (Andretti Global)
- Time: 00:47.5485

Podium
- First: (Spain) Álex Palou (Chip Ganassi Racing)
- Second: (United States) Josef Newgarden (Team Penske)
- Third: (United States) David Malukas (Team Penske)

Chronology
Previous	Next
2025	2027

The 2026 Borchetta Bourbon Music City Grand Prix presented by OnlyBulls was the twelfth round of the 2026 IndyCar season. The race was originally scheduled to be held on Sunday, July 19, 2026, but after failed track drying attempts, the race would be postponed until Monday, July 20, due to severe rain. The race was run in Lebanon, Tennessee at the Nashville Superspeedway. Originally scheduled to be contested of 300 laps, the race was contested of 225 laps due to extreme heat conditions.

Álex Palou won the race, Josef Newgarden finished 2nd, and David Malukas finished 3rd. Scott McLaughlin and Felix Rosenqvist rounded out the top five, while Marcus Ericsson, Pato O'Ward, Mick Schumacher, Kyffin Simpson, and Kyle Kirkwood rounded out the top ten.

== Race background ==
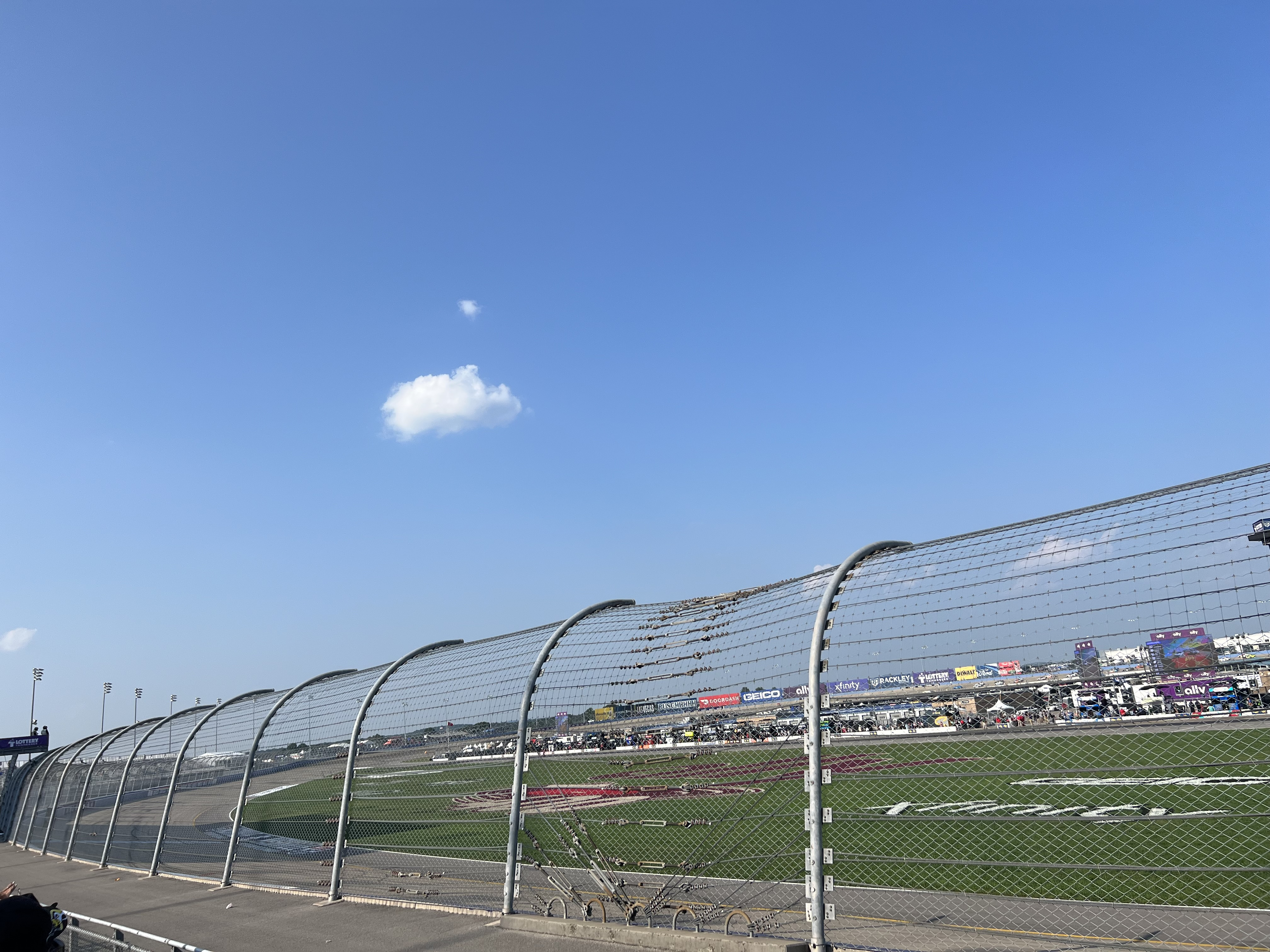
Nashville Superspeedway, the track where the race will be held.

The Borchetta Bourbon Music City Grand Prix, is held at Nashville Superspeedway in Lebanon, Tennessee on its 4-turn oval layout. Due to the construction of New Nissan Stadium, this will be the third consecutive year that the race will be held at the Superspeedway. As a 1.333-mile (2.15 km) track, it is also currently a points-paying race of the NTT IndyCar Series. The event is contested by "Indy Car", that is a formula of professional-level, single-seat, open cockpit, open-wheel, purpose-built race cars.

== Entry list ==
Key	Meaning
R	Rookie
W	Past winner

No.	Driver	Team	Engine
2	(United States) Josef Newgarden W	Team Penske	Chevrolet
3	(New Zealand) Scott McLaughlin	Team Penske	Chevrolet
4	(Brazil) Caio Collet R	A.J. Foyt Racing	Chevrolet
5	(Mexico) Pato O'Ward	Arrow McLaren	Chevrolet
6	(United States) Nolan Siegel	Arrow McLaren	Chevrolet
7	(Denmark) Christian Lundgaard	Arrow McLaren	Chevrolet
8	(Cayman Islands) Kyffin Simpson	Chip Ganassi Racing	Honda
9	(New Zealand) Scott Dixon W	Chip Ganassi Racing	Honda
10	(Spain) Álex Palou	Chip Ganassi Racing	Honda
12	(United States) David Malukas	Team Penske	Chevrolet
14	(United States) Santino Ferrucci	A. J. Foyt Racing	Chevrolet
15	(United States) Graham Rahal	Rahal Letterman Lanigan Racing	Honda
18	(France) Romain Grosjean	Dale Coyne Racing	Honda
19	(Norway) Dennis Hauger R	Dale Coyne Racing	Honda
20	(United States) Alexander Rossi	ECR	Chevrolet
21	(Denmark) Christian Rasmussen	ECR	Chevrolet
26	(Australia) Will Power	Andretti Global	Honda
27	(United States) Kyle Kirkwood	Andretti Global with Curb-Agajanian	Honda
28	(Sweden) Marcus Ericsson	Andretti Global	Honda
45	(United Kingdom) Louis Foster	Rahal Letterman Lanigan Racing	Honda
47	(Germany) Mick Schumacher R	Rahal Letterman Lanigan Racing	Honda
60	(Sweden) Felix Rosenqvist	Meyer Shank Racing with Curb-Agajanian	Honda
66	(New Zealand) Marcus Armstrong	Meyer Shank Racing with Curb-Agajanian	Honda
76	(Netherlands) Rinus VeeKay	Juncos Hollinger Racing	Chevrolet
77	(United States) Sting Ray Robb	Juncos Hollinger Racing	Chevrolet

== Practice ==
Top Practice Speeds
Pos	No.	Driver	Team	Engine	Lap Time
1	27	(United States) Kyle Kirkwood	Andretti Global	Honda	00:23.7447
2	10	(Spain) Álex Palou	Chip Gannasi Racing	Honda	00:23.7605
3	12	(United States) David Malukas	Team Penske	Chevrolet	00:23.8362

== Qualifying ==
Qualifying was held on July 18, 2026, at 2:00 p.m. CT. Due to FOX's broadcasting of the FIFA World Cup third place game, the TV broadcast skipped the first four drivers.

=== Qualifying classification ===
Pos	No.	Driver	Team	Engine	Time	Final grid							
Pos	No.	Driver	Team	Engine	Time	Final grid	1	27	(United States) Kyle Kirkwood	Andretti Global	Honda	00:47.5485	1
Pos	No.	Driver	Team	Engine	2	Final grid	2	(United States) Josef Newgarden W	Team Penske	Chevrolet	47.5993	2	
3	3	(New Zealand) Scott McLaughlin	Team Penske	Chevrolet	47.7339	3							
4	10	(Spain) Álex Palou	Chip Ganassi Racing	Honda	47.7429	4							
5	9	(New Zealand) Scott Dixon W	Chip Ganassi Racing	Honda	47.8034	5							
6	20	(United States) Alexander Rossi	ECR	Chevrolet	47.8371	6							
7	21	(Denmark) Christian Rasmussen	ECR	Chevrolet	47.8565	7							
8	66	(New Zealand) Marcus Armstrong	Meyer Shank Racing with Curb Agajanian	Honda	47.8581	8							
9	76	(Netherlands) Rinus VeeKay	Juncos Hollinger Racing	Chevrolet	47.8933	9							
10	28	(Sweden) Marcus Ericsson	Andretti Global	Honda	47.9045	10							
11	14	(United States) Santino Ferrucci	A. J. Foyt Racing	Chevrolet	47.9183	11							
12	5	(Mexico) Pato O'Ward	Arrow McLaren	Chevrolet	47.9622	12							
13	6	(United States) Nolan Siegel	Arrow McLaren	Chevrolet	48.0131	13							
14	26	(Australia) Will Power	Andretti Global	Honda	48.0421	14							
15	4	(Brazil) Caio Collet R	A.J. Foyt Racing	Chevrolet	48.0426	15							
16	47	(Germany) Mick Schumacher R	Rahal Letterman Lanigan Racing	Honda	48.0457	16							
17	60	(Sweden) Felix Rosenqvist	Meyer Shank Racing	Honda	48.0472	17							
18	8	(Cayman Islands) Kyffin Simpson	Chip Ganassi Racing	Honda	48.1594	18							
19	7	(Denmark) Christian Lundgaard	Arrow McLaren	Chevrolet	48.2260	24							
20	45	(United Kingdom) Louis Foster	Rahal Letterman Lanigan Racing	Chevrolet	48.2275	19							
21	77	(United States) Sting Ray Robb	Juncos Hollinger Racing	Chevrolet	48.3982	20							
22	18	(France) Romain Grosjean	Dale Coyne Racing	Honda	48.6018	22							
23	19	(Norway) Dennis Hauger R	Dale Coyne Racing	Honda	48.6936	22							
24	12	(United States) David Malukas	Team Penske	Chevrolet	No Time	25							
25	15	(United States) Graham Rahal	Rahal Letterman Lanigan Racing	Honda	No Time	23							
Official Results

Notes

- **Bold text** indicates fastest time.

== Post-qualifying practice ==
There was a practice session using the high-line. Pole-sitter Kyle Kirkwood led the session.

=== Final practice ===
Top Practice Speeds
Pos	No.	Driver	Team	Engine	Lap Time
1	12	(United States) David Malukas	Team Penske	Chevrolet	00:24.1529
2	3	(New Zealand) Scott McLaughlin	Team Penske	Chevrolet	00:24.1880
3	66	(New Zealand) Marcus Armstrong	Meyer Shank Racing with Curb-Agajanian	Honda	00:24.2080

== Race ==
The race was scheduled to be held on July 19, 2026, after the 2026 FIFA World Cup final, at around 4:30 p.m. CT but due to failed track drying attempts and heavy rainfall, the race would be postponed until Monday, July 20 at 2:00 p.m. CT. Originally scheduled to be contested of 300 laps, the race will be contested of 225 laps due to extreme heat conditions.

=== Race classification ===
Pos	No.	Driver	Team	Engine	Laps	Time/Retired	Pit Stops	Grid	Laps Led	Pts.
1	10	(Spain) Álex Palou	Chip Ganassi Racing	Honda	225	1:51:38.7603	4	4	97	53
2	2	(United States) Josef Newgarden W	Team Penske	Chevrolet	225	+0.8731	4	2	-	40
3	12	(United States) David Malukas	Team Penske	Chevrolet	225	+1.2198	3	25	59	36
4	3	(New Zealand) Scott McLaughlin	Team Penske	Chevrolet	225	+5.4435	4	3	32	33
5	60	(Sweden) Felix Rosenqvist	Meyer Shank Racing	Honda	225	+6.0746	4	17	1	31
6	28	(Sweden) Marcus Ericsson	Andretti Global	Honda	225	+6.9916	4	10	-	28
7	5	(Mexico) Pato O'Ward	Arrow McLaren	Chevrolet	225	+7.9795	4	12	-	26
8	47	(Germany) Mick Schumacher R	Rahal Letterman Lanigan Racing	Honda	225	+8.7447	4	16	-	24
9	8	(Cayman Islands) Kyffin Simpson	Chip Ganassi Racing	Honda	225	+9.3648	5	18	-	22
10	27	(United States) Kyle Kirkwood	Andretti Global	Honda	225	+10.1497	4	1	24	22
11	6	(United States) Nolan Siegel	Arrow McLaren	Chevrolet	225	+11.1337	4	13	-	19
12	76	(Netherlands) Rinus VeeKay	Juncos Hollinger Racing	Chevrolet	225	+11.7236	4	9	-	18
13	14	(United States) Santino Ferrucci	A. J. Foyt Enterprises	Chevrolet	225	+13.0012	4	11	-	17
14	18	(France) Romain Grosjean	Dale Coyne Racing	Honda	225	+16.6682	4	21	-	16
15	77	(United States) Sting Ray Robb	Juncos Hollinger Racing	Chevrolet	225	+19.0542	4	20	-	15
16	7	(Denmark) Christian Lundgaard	Arrow McLaren	Chevrolet	225	+23.8636	4	24	-	14
17	45	(United Kingdom) Louis Foster	Rahal Letterman Lanigan Racing	Honda	223	+2 Laps	5	19	10	14
18	9	(New Zealand) Scott Dixon W	Chip Ganassi Racing	Honda	218	+6 Laps	7	5	-	12
19	15	(United States) Graham Rahal	Rahal Letterman Lanigan Racing	Honda	209	Retired	9	23	-	11
20	26	(Australia) Will Power	Andretti Global	Honda	209	+16 Laps	6	14	2	11
21	19	(Norway) Dennis Hauger R	Dale Coyne Racing	Honda	178	Contact	4	22	-	9
22	21	(Denmark) Christian Rasmussen	Ed Carpenter Racing	Chevrolet	127	Retired	3	7	-	8
23	20	(United States) Alexander Rossi	Ed Carpenter Racing	Chevrolet	121	Contact	2	6	-	7
24	66	(New Zealand) Marcus Armstrong	Meyer Shank Racing	Honda	104	Mechanical	2	8	-	6
25	4	(Brazil) Caio Collet R	A. J. Foyt Enterprises	Chevrolet	17	Contact	0	15	-	5
Fastest lap: (New Zealand) Scott McLaughlin (Team Penske) - 24.1178 (Lap 207)
Official Results

== Championship standings after the race ==
Drivers' Championship standings

	Pos.	Driver	Points
Unchanged	1	(Spain) Álex Palou	457
2	2	(United States) David Malukas	374 (–83)
1	3	(United States) Kyle Kirkwood	370 (–87)
1	4	(Denmark) Christian Lundgaard	353 (–104)
Unchanged	5	(Mexico) Pato O'Ward	336 (–121)

Engine manufacturer standings

	Pos.	Manufacturer	Points
Unchanged	1	Honda	983
Unchanged	2	Chevrolet	938 (–45)

- Note: Only the top five positions are included.

== Footnotes ==
Previous race: 2026 Honda Indy 200	IndyCar Series; 2026 season	Next race: 2026 OnlyBulls Grand Prix of Portland
Previous race: 2025 Borchetta Bourbon Music City Grand Prix	Borchetta Bourbon Music City Grand Prix	Next race: 2027 Borchetta Bourbon Music City Grand Prix
