= 2025 BitNile.com Grand Prix of Portland =

IndyCar race held in Portland, Oregon

(United States) 2025 BitNile.com Grand Prix of Portland
Race details
15th round of the 2025 IndyCar season
← Previous race	Next race →
- Layout of the Portland International Raceway
- Date: August 10, 2025
- Official name: BitNile.com Grand Prix of Portland presented by askROI
- Location: Portland International Raceway, Portland, Oregon
- Course: Permanent road course 1.964 mi / 3.161 km
- Distance: 110 laps 216.04 mi / 347.68 km

Pole position
- Driver: (Denmark) Christian Lundgaard (Arrow McLaren)
- Time: 58.3939

Fastest lap
- Driver: (Australia) Will Power (Team Penske)
- Time: 01:00.1259 (on lap 22 of 110)

Podium
- First: (Australia) Will Power (Team Penske)
- Second: (Denmark) Christian Lundgaard (Arrow McLaren)
- Third: (Spain) Álex Palou (Chip Ganassi Racing)

Chronology
Previous	Next
2024	2026

The 2025 BitNile.com Grand Prix of Portland presented by askROI was an IndyCar Series motor race held on August 10, 2025, at the Portland International Raceway in Portland, Oregon. It was the 15th round of the 2025 NTT IndyCar Series season, and the 31st running of the event. Team Penske driver Will Power won the 110-lap race starting from the third position. Christian Lundgaard finished second for Arrow McLaren, and Álex Palou, driving for Chip Ganassi Racing, finished third. It was Power's first victory of the season and the 45th of his IndyCar career.

Palou's 3rd place would be enough to ensure he won the drivers championship for the third consecutive season and fourth time in his career.

== Background ==
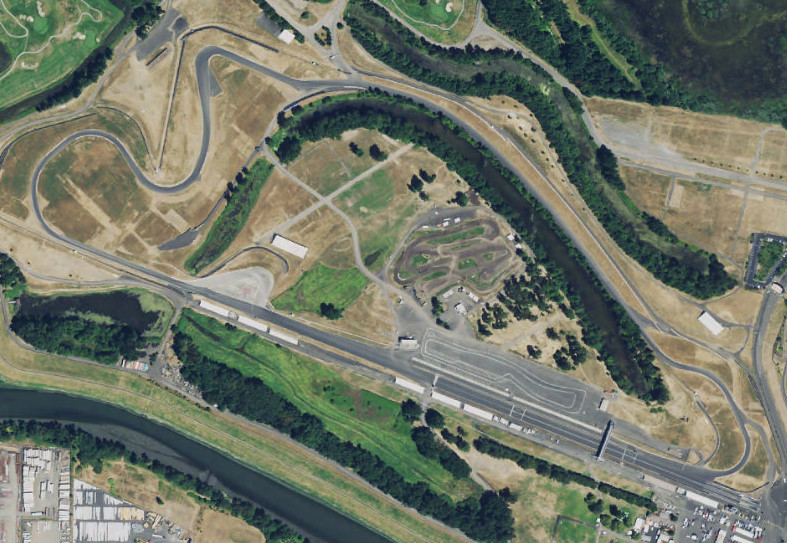
Portland International Raceway (pictured in 2021), where the race was held.

The BitNile.com Grand Prix of Portland was confirmed to be included on IndyCar's 2025 schedule in June 2024. It was the 15th of 17 scheduled races for 2025, and the 31st edition of the event in top-level American open-wheel competition. The race was held on Sunday, August 10, 2025, at the Portland International Raceway, a 1.964 mi (3.161 km), 12-turn road course circuit in Portland, Oregon, United States. It was scheduled to last 110 laps over a distance of 216.04 miles (347.68 km). Tire supplier Firestone provided the softer alternate tires and the more durable primary tires; drivers were required to run at least one set of both types of tires during the race.

Heading into the event, Chip Ganassi Racing driver Álex Palou led the Drivers' Championship with 590 points, 121 more than Arrow McLaren driver Pato O'Ward, who was second. Palou's teammate Scott Dixon held third with 392 points, while Andretti Global driver Kyle Kirkwood, with 377 points, and O'Ward's teammate Christian Lundgaard, with 357 points, took the fourth and fifth positions. In the Engine Manufacturer Championship, Honda led with 1,314 points, 224 points ahead of Chevrolet.

Palou was in position to clinch the championship if he held minimum gap of 108 points over O'Ward exiting the race.

== Practice ==
=== Practice 1 ===
The first practice session was held on Friday, August 8, at 2:30 PM PT.

Top Practice Speeds
Pos	No.	Driver	Team	Engine	Lap Time
1	7	(Denmark) Christian Lundgaard	Arrow McLaren	Chevrolet	00:58.5320
2	10	(Spain) Álex Palou	Chip Ganassi Racing	Honda	00:58.5381
3	60	(Sweden) Felix Rosenqvist	Meyer Shank Racing with Curb-Agajanian	Honda	00:58.6589

=== Practice 2 ===
The second practice session was held on Saturday, August 9, at 9:00 AM PT.

Top Practice Speeds
Pos	No.	Driver	Team	Engine	Lap Time
1	26	(United States) Colton Herta	Andretti Global with Curb-Agajanian	Honda	00:58.4238
2	10	(Spain) Álex Palou	Chip Ganassi Racing	Honda	00:58.4531
3	9	(New Zealand) Scott Dixon	Chip Ganassi Racing	Honda	00:58.5023

== Qualifying ==
Qualifying was held on Saturday, August 9, at 11:30 AM PT.

=== Qualifying classification ===
Key	Meaning
R	Rookie
W	Past winner

Pos	No.	Driver	Team	Engine	Time	Final grid
1	7	(Denmark) Christian Lundgaard (Note: Lundgaard, the fastest qualifier, was assessed a 6-place grid penalty for an unapproved engine change. Pato O'Ward, who qualified 2nd, was the highest-placed driver not to have a penalty, and thus will start the race from pole position. Lundgaard earned the pole award and the pole-winner's championship point.)	Arrow McLaren	Chevrolet	00:58.3939	7
2	5	(Mexico) Pato O'Ward	Arrow McLaren	Chevrolet	00:58.5343	1
3	60	(Sweden) Felix Rosenqvist	Meyer Shank Racing with Curb-Agajanian	Honda	00:58.5583	2
4	12	(Australia) Will Power W	Team Penske	Chevrolet	00:58.6424	3
5	4	(United States) David Malukas	A.J. Foyt Enterprises	Chevrolet	00:58.6557	4
6	10	(Spain) Álex Palou W	Chip Ganassi Racing	Honda	00:58.6690	5
7	20	(United States) Alexander Rossi	Ed Carpenter Racing	Chevrolet	00:58.4973	6
8	66	(New Zealand) Marcus Armstrong	Meyer Shank Racing with Curb-Agajanian	Honda	00:58.5320	8
9	2	(United States) Josef Newgarden	Team Penske	Chevrolet	00:58.6960	9
10	9	(New Zealand) Scott Dixon	Chip Ganassi Racing	Honda	00:58.7446	10
11	28	(Sweden) Marcus Ericsson	Andretti Global	Honda	00:58.7483	11
12	8	(Cayman Islands) Kyffin Simpson	Chip Ganassi Racing	Honda	00:58.7715	12
13	3	(New Zealand) Scott McLaughlin W	Team Penske	Chevrolet	00:58.5449	13
14	30	(Canada) Devlin DeFrancesco	Rahal Letterman Lanigan Racing	Honda	00:58.4702	14
15	14	(United States) Santino Ferrucci	A.J. Foyt Enterprises	Chevrolet	00:58.6237	15
16	26	(United States) Colton Herta	Andretti Global with Curb-Agajanian	Honda	00:58.5312	16
17	45	(United Kingdom) Louis Foster R	Rahal Letterman Lanigan Racing	Honda	00:58.6376	17
18	21	(Denmark) Christian Rasmussen	Ed Carpenter Racing	Chevrolet	00:58.5457	18
19	6	(United States) Nolan Siegel	Arrow McLaren	Chevrolet	00:58.7105	19
20	27	(United States) Kyle Kirkwood	Andretti Global	Honda	00:58.5693	20
21	77	(United States) Sting Ray Robb	Juncos Hollinger Racing	Chevrolet	00:58.9272	21
22	15	(United States) Graham Rahal	Rahal Letterman Lanigan Racing	Honda	00:58.5836	22
23	18	(Netherlands) Rinus VeeKay	Dale Coyne Racing	Honda	00:59.0866	23
24	90	(United Kingdom) Callum Ilott	PREMA Racing	Chevrolet	00:58.7557	24
25	83	(Israel) Robert Shwartzman R	PREMA Racing	Chevrolet	00:59.7458	25
26	76	(United States) Conor Daly	Juncos Hollinger Racing	Chevrolet	00:58.9617	26
27	51	(United States) Jacob Abel R	Dale Coyne Racing	Honda	00:58.9648	27

== Final practice ==
The final practice session was held on Saturday, August 9, at 4:30 PM PT.

Top Practice Speeds
Pos	No.	Driver	Team	Engine	Lap Time
1	10	(Spain) Álex Palou	Chip Ganassi Racing	Honda	00:59.1766
2	26	(United States) Colton Herta	Andretti Global	Honda	00:59.4124
3	15	(United States) Graham Rahal	Rahal Letterman Lanigan Racing	Honda	00:59.4526

== Race ==
The race was held on Sunday, August 10, at 12:30 PM PT.

=== Race classification ===
Pos	Grid	No.	Driver	Team	Engine	Laps	Laps Led	Pit Stops	Time/Retired	Pts.
1	3	12	(Australia) Will Power	Team Penske	Chevrolet	110	78	3	02:01:06.0311	53
2	7	7	(Denmark) Christian Lundgaard	Arrow McLaren	Chevrolet	110	–	3	02:01:07.5699	41
3	5	10	(Spain) Álex Palou	Chip Ganassi Racing	Honda	110	5	3	02:01:08.4796	36
4	22	15	(United States) Graham Rahal	Rahal Letterman Lanigan Racing	Honda	110	10	4	02:01:16.6102	33
5	6	20	(United States) Alexander Rossi	Ed Carpenter Racing	Chevrolet	110	–	3	02:01:22.2065	30
6	24	90	(United Kingdom) Callum Ilott	PREMA Racing	Chevrolet	110	–	4	02:01:23.7808	28
7	11	3	(New Zealand) Scott McLaughlin	Team Penske	Chevrolet	110	–	3	02:01:32.9666	26
8	8	66	(New Zealand) Marcus Armstrong	Meyer Shank Racing with Curb-Agajanian	Honda	110	–	3	02:01:34.2044	24
9	2	60	(Sweden) Felix Rosenqvist	Meyer Shank Racing with Curb-Agajanian	Honda	110	–	3	02:01:36.1324	22
10	13	26	(United States) Colton Herta	Andretti Global with Curb-Agajanian	Honda	110	–	3	02:01:43.6407	20
11	9	9	(New Zealand) Scott Dixon	Chip Ganassi Racing	Honda	110	–	3	02:01:44.4335	19
12	16	21	(Denmark) Christian Rasmussen	Ed Carpenter Racing	Chevrolet	110	–	3	02:01:45.5741	18
13	14	45	(United Kingdom) Louis Foster	Rahal Letterman Lanigan Racing	Honda	110	–	5	02:01:58.1090	17
14	20	77	(United States) Sting Ray Robb	Juncos Hollinger Racing	Chevrolet	110	–	5	02:01:59.0680	16
15	25	83	(Israel) Robert Shwartzman	PREMA Racing	Chevrolet	110	–	4	02:02:00.5404	15
16	17	6	(United States) Nolan Siegel	Arrow McLaren	Chevrolet	110	–	3	02:02:03.1437	14
17	23	18	(Netherlands) Rinus VeeKay	Dale Coyne Racing	Honda	110	–	4	02:02:04.3587	13
18	12	30	(Canada) Devlin DeFrancesco	Rahal Letterman Lanigan Racing	Honda	110	–	3	02:02:06.1934	12
19	4	4	(United States) David Malukas	A.J. Foyt Enterprises	Chevrolet	109	–	4	-1 Lap	11
20	19	27	(United States) Kyle Kirkwood	Andretti Global	Honda	109	–	3	-1 Lap	10
21	18	8	(Cayman Islands) Kyffin Simpson	Chip Ganassi Racing	Honda	109	–	3	-1 Lap	9
22	10	28	(Sweden) Marcus Ericsson	Andretti Global	Honda	109	–	3	-1 Lap	8
23	27	51	(United States) Jacob Abel	Dale Coyne Racing	Honda	109	–	4	-1 Lap	7
24	15	2	(United States) Josef Newgarden	Team Penske	Chevrolet	109	2	3	-1 Lap	7
25	1	5	(Mexico) Pato O'Ward	Arrow McLaren	Chevrolet	100	15	5	-10 Laps	6
26	26	76	(United States) Conor Daly	Juncos Hollinger Racing	Chevrolet	13	–	1	Contact	5
27	15	14	(United States) Santino Ferrucci	A.J. Foyt Enterprises	Chevrolet	1	–	–	Contact	5
Fastest lap: (Australia) Will Power 01:00.1259

== Championship standings after the race ==
Drivers' Championship standings

	Pos.	Driver	Points
Unchanged	1	(Spain) Álex Palou	626
Unchanged	2	(Mexico) Pato O'Ward	475 (–151)
Unchanged	3	(New Zealand) Scott Dixon	411 (–215)
1	4	(Denmark) Christian Lundgaard	398 (–228)
1	5	(United States) Kyle Kirkwood	387 (–239)

Engine manufacturer standings

	Pos.	Manufacturer	Points
Unchanged	1	Honda	1389
Unchanged	2	Chevrolet	1177 (–212)

- Note: Only the top five positions are included.

== Notes ==
Previous race: 2025 Java House Grand Prix of Monterey	IndyCar Series; 2025 season	Next race: 2025 Snap-on Milwaukee Mile 250
Previous race: 2024 BitNile.com Grand Prix of Portland	Grand Prix of Portland	Next race: 2026 OnlyBulls Grand Prix of Portland
