= 2026 OnlyBulls Grand Prix of Portland =

IndyCar race held in Portland, Oregon

(United States) 2026 OnlyBulls Grand Prix of Portland
Race details
13th round of the 2026 IndyCar season
← Previous race	Next race →
- Layout of the Portland International Raceway
- Date: August 9, 2026
- Official name: OnlyBulls Grand Prix of Portland
- Location: Portland International Raceway, Portland, Oregon
- Course: Permanent road course 1.964 mi / 3.161 km
- Distance: 110 laps 216.04 mi / 347.68 km

Pole position
- Driver: (Sweden) Felix Rosenqvist (Meyer Shank Racing with Curb-Agajanian)
- Time: 58.482

Fastest lap
- Driver: (Sweden) Marcus Ericsson (Andretti Global)
- Time: 1:00.3070 (on lap 5 of 110)

Podium
- First: (Spain) Álex Palou (Chip Ganassi Racing)
- Second: (Sweden) Felix Rosenqvist (Meyer Shank Racing with Curb-Agajanian)
- Third: (Australia) Will Power (Andretti Global)

Chronology
Previous	Next
2025	2027

The 2026 OnlyBulls Grand Prix of Portland was the thirteenth round of the 2026 IndyCar season. The race was held on August 9, 2026, in Portland, Oregon at Portland International Raceway. The race was contested of 110 laps. Álex Palou won the race, extending his championship lead to over 100 points, polesitter Felix Rosenqvist finished 2nd, and Will Power finished 3rd. Rinus VeeKay and Kyle Kirkwood rounded out the top five, while Marcus Ericsson, Scott McLaughlin, Josef Newgarden, Christian Lundgaard, and Kyffin Simpson rounded out the top ten.

== Background ==
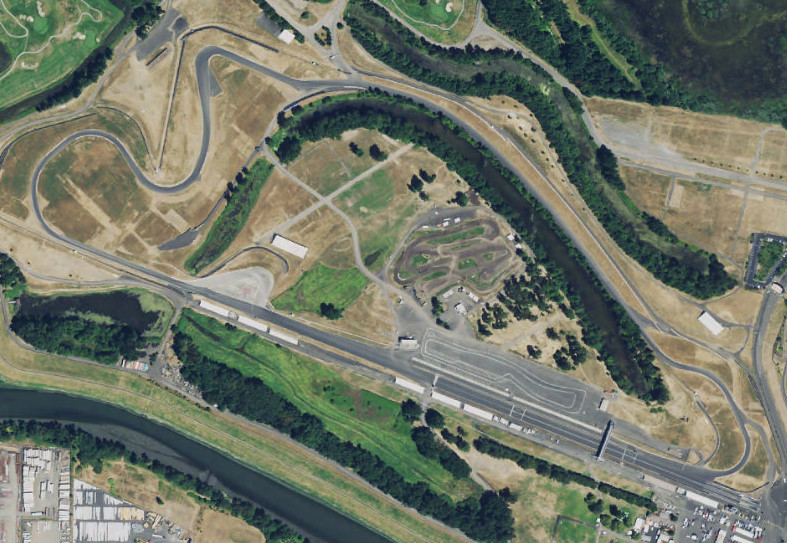
Portland International Raceway (pictured in 2021), the track where the race will be held.

The OnlyBulls Grand Prix of Portland, is held at Portland International Raceway in Portland, Oregon on its 14-turn road course layout. As a 1.964-mile (3.16 km) track, it is also currently a points-paying race of the NTT IndyCar Series. The event is contested by "Indy Car", that is a formula of professional-level, single-seat, open cockpit, open-wheel, purpose-built race cars.

=== Standings before the race ===
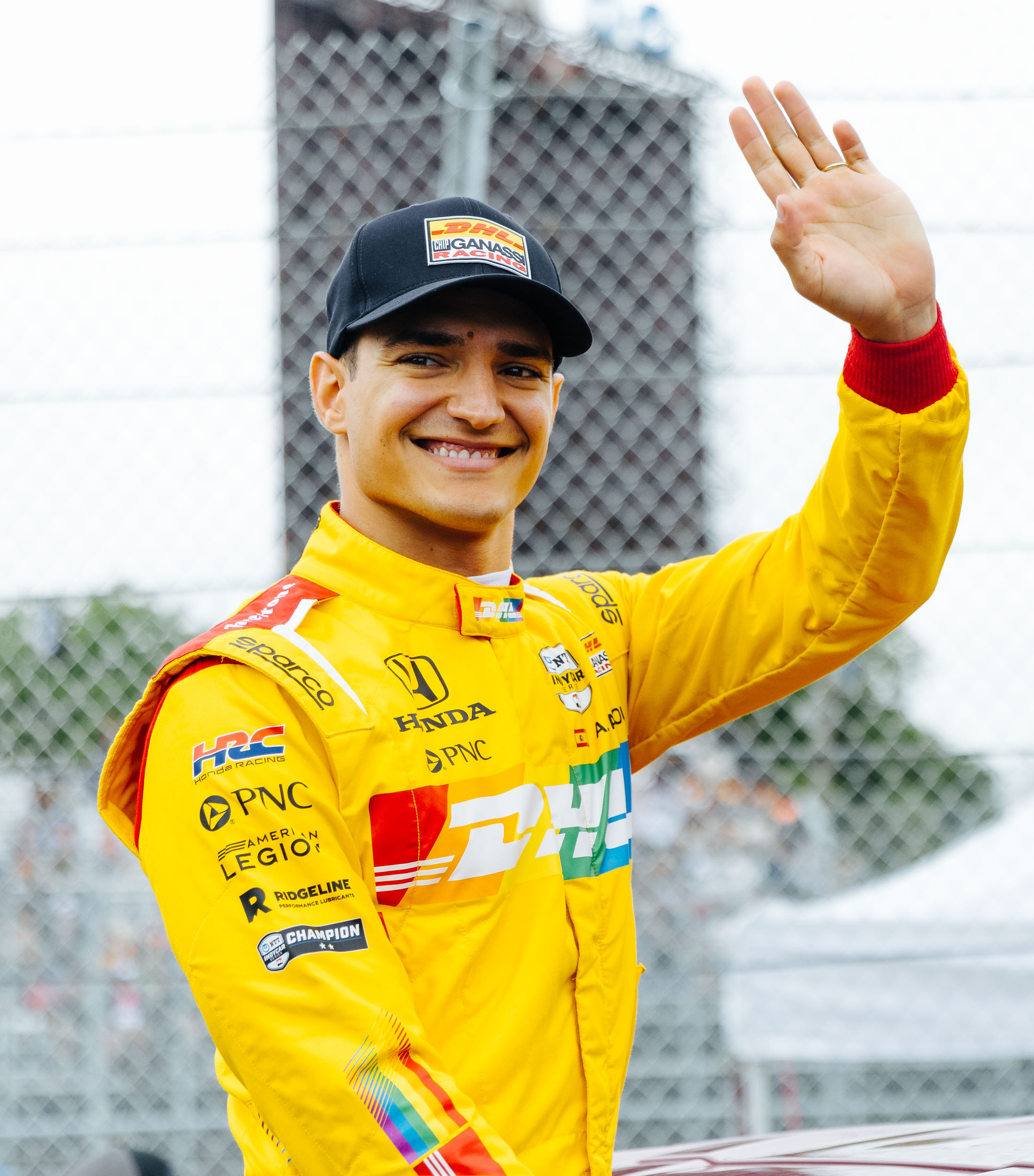
Álex Palou (pictured in 2024), the championship leader before the race.

Heading into the event, Chip Ganassi Racing driver Álex Palou led the Drivers' Championship with 457 points, 86 more than Team Penske driver David Malukas, who was second. Andretti Global driver Kyle Kirkwood is third with 370 points, and Christian Lundgaard and his Arrow McLaren teammate Pato O'Ward are fourth and fifth in points. In the Engine Manufacturer Championship, Honda led with 983 points, while Chevrolet had 938 points.

== Entry list ==
Key	Meaning
R	Rookie
W	Past winner

No.	Driver	Team	Engine
2	(United States) Josef Newgarden	Team Penske	Chevrolet
3	(New Zealand) Scott McLaughlin W	Team Penske	Chevrolet
4	(Brazil) Caio Collet R	A.J. Foyt Racing	Chevrolet
5	(Mexico) Pato O'Ward	Arrow McLaren	Chevrolet
6	(United States) Nolan Siegel	Arrow McLaren	Chevrolet
7	(Denmark) Christian Lundgaard	Arrow McLaren	Chevrolet
8	(Cayman Islands) Kyffin Simpson	Chip Ganassi Racing	Honda
9	(New Zealand) Scott Dixon	Chip Ganassi Racing	Honda
10	(Spain) Álex Palou W	Chip Ganassi Racing	Honda
12	(United States) David Malukas	Team Penske	Chevrolet
14	(United States) Santino Ferrucci	A. J. Foyt Racing	Chevrolet
15	(United States) Graham Rahal	Rahal Letterman Lanigan Racing	Honda
18	(France) Romain Grosjean	Dale Coyne Racing	Honda
19	(Norway) Dennis Hauger R	Dale Coyne Racing	Honda
20	(United States) Alexander Rossi	ECR	Chevrolet
21	(Denmark) Christian Rasmussen	ECR	Chevrolet
26	(Australia) Will Power W	Andretti Global	Honda
27	(United States) Kyle Kirkwood	Andretti Global with Curb-Agajanian	Honda
28	(Sweden) Marcus Ericsson	Andretti Global	Honda
45	(United Kingdom) Louis Foster	Rahal Letterman Lanigan Racing	Honda
47	(Germany) Mick Schumacher R	Rahal Letterman Lanigan Racing	Honda
60	(Sweden) Felix Rosenqvist	Meyer Shank Racing with Curb-Agajanian	Honda
66	(New Zealand) Marcus Armstrong	Meyer Shank Racing with Curb-Agajanian	Honda
76	(Netherlands) Rinus VeeKay	Juncos Hollinger Racing	Chevrolet
77	(United States) Sting Ray Robb	Juncos Hollinger Racing	Chevrolet

== Practice ==
=== Practice 1 ===
The first practice session was held on Friday, August 7, at 2:30 p.m. PT.

Top Practice Speeds
Pos	No.	Driver	Team	Engine	Lap Time
1	10	(Spain) Álex Palou W	Chip Ganassi Racing	Honda	58.5716
2	27	(United States) Kyle Kirkwood	Andretti Global	Honda	58.6602
3	76	(Netherlands) Rinus VeeKay	Juncos Hollinger Racing	Chevrolet	58.7996
Practice 1 results

=== Practice 2 ===
The second practice session was held on Saturday, August 8, at 10:00 a.m. PT.

Top Practice Speeds
Pos	No.	Driver	Team	Engine	Lap Time
1	66	(New Zealand) Marcus Armstrong	Meyer Shank Racing	Honda	58.2981
2	10	(Spain) Álex Palou W	Chip Ganassi Racing	Honda	58.6106
3	9	(New Zealand) Scott Dixon	Chip Ganassi Racing	Honda	58.6404
Practice 2 results

== Qualifying ==
Qualifying was held on Saturday, August 8, at 4:00 p.m. PT.

=== Qualifying classification ===
Pos	No.	Driver	Team	Engine	Time	Final grid
1	60	(Sweden) Felix Rosenqvist	Meyer Shank Racing	Honda	58.482	1
2	10	(Spain) Álex Palou W	Chip Ganassi Racing	Honda	58.5012	2
3	26	(Australia) Will Power W	Andretti Global	Honda	58.5130	3
4	28	(Sweden) Marcus Ericsson	Andretti Global	Honda	58.6729	4
5	76	(Netherlands) Rinus VeeKay	Juncos Hollinger Racing	Chevrolet	58.7701	5
6	8	(Cayman Islands) Kyffin Simpson	Chip Ganassi Racing	Honda	59.0841	6
7	27	(United States) Kyle Kirkwood	Andretti Global	Honda	58.8303	7
8	15	(United States) Graham Rahal	Rahal Letterman Lanigan Racing	Honda	58.8465	8
9	12	(United States) David Malukas	Team Penske	Chevrolet	58.8690	15
10	19	(Norway) Dennis Hauger R	Dale Coyne Racing	Honda	58.8787	9
11	18	(France) Romain Grosjean	Dale Coyne Racing	Honda	58.9425	10
12	9	(New Zealand) Scott Dixon	Chip Ganassi Racing	Honda	59.2023	11
13	45	(United Kingdom) Louis Foster	Rahal Letterman Lanigan Racing	Chevrolet	58.5764	12
14	3	(New Zealand) Scott McLaughlin W	Team Penske	Chevrolet	58.7829	13
15	2	(United States) Josef Newgarden	Team Penske	Chevrolet	58.5819	14
16	6	(United States) Nolan Siegel	Arrow McLaren	Chevrolet	58.8757	16
17	5	(Mexico) Pato O'Ward	Arrow McLaren	Chevrolet	58.5825	17
18	4	(Brazil) Caio Collet R	A.J. Foyt Racing	Chevrolet	58.9054	24
19	20	(United States) Alexander Rossi	ECR	Chevrolet	58.5928	18
20	21	(Denmark) Christian Rasmussen	ECR	Chevrolet	58.9069	19
21	66	(New Zealand) Marcus Armstrong	Meyer Shank Racing with Curb Agajanian	Honda	58.6089	20
22	14	(United States) Santino Ferrucci	A. J. Foyt Racing	Chevrolet	58.9183	21
23	47	(Germany) Mick Schumacher R	Rahal Letterman Lanigan Racing	Honda	58.7043	22
24	77	(United States) Sting Ray Robb	Juncos Hollinger Racing	Chevrolet	59.0258	23
25	7	(Denmark) Christian Lundgaard	Arrow McLaren	Chevrolet	59.5423	25
Official Report

== Warmup ==
The Warmup session was held on Sunday, August 9, at 10:00 a.m. PT.

Top Practice Speeds
Pos	No.	Driver	Team	Engine	Lap Time
1	2	(United States) Josef Newgarden	Team Penske	Chevrolet	58.7183
2	76	(Netherlands) Rinus VeeKay	Juncos Hollinger Racing	Chevrolet	59.0794
3	9	(New Zealand) Scott Dixon	Chip Ganassi Racing	Honda	59.0963
Official Results

== Race ==
The race was held on Sunday August 9, at 1:00 p.m. PT.

=== Race classification ===
Pos	No.	Driver	Team	Engine	Laps	Time/Retired	Pit Stops	Grid	Laps Led	Pts.
1	10	(Spain) Álex Palou W	Chip Ganassi Racing	Honda	110	1:55:03.4235	3	2	60	53
2	60	(Sweden) Felix Rosenqvist	Meyer Shank Racing with Curb-Agajanian	Honda	110	+4.1167	3	1	33	42
3	26	(Australia) Will Power W	Andretti Global	Honda	110	+8.0625	3	3	6	36
4	76	(Netherlands) Rinus VeeKay	Juncos Hollinger Racing	Chevrolet	110	+16.5767	3	5		32
5	27	(United States) Kyle Kirkwood	Andretti Global	Honda	110	+19.3783	3	7		30
6	28	(Sweden) Marcus Ericsson	Andretti Global	Honda	110	+20.0321	3	4		28
7	3	(New Zealand) Scott McLaughlin W	Team Penske	Chevrolet	110	+21.4241	3	13		26
8	2	(United States) Josef Newgarden	Team Penske	Chevrolet	110	+22.1024	4	14	11	25
9	7	(Denmark) Christian Lundgaard	Arrow McLaren	Chevrolet	110	+25.7500	3	25		22
10	8	(Cayman Islands) Kyffin Simpson	Chip Ganassi Racing	Honda	110	+29.2783	3	6		20
11	5	(Mexico) Pato O'Ward	Arrow McLaren	Chevrolet	10	+33.0900	3	17		19
12	12	(United States) David Malukas	Team Penske	Chevrolet	110	+34.0238	3	15		18
13	19	(Norway) Dennis Hauger R	Dale Coyne Racing	Honda	110	+42.5497	3	9		17
14	9	(New Zealand) Scott Dixon	Chip Ganassi Racing	Honda	110	+43.4498	3	11		16
15	45	(United Kingdom) Louis Foster	Rahal Letterman Lanigan Racing	Honda	110	+48.9331	3	12		15
16	47	(Germany) Mick Schumacher R	Rahal Letterman Lanigan Racing	Honda	110	+59.0072	3	22		14
17	18	(France) Romain Grosjean	Dale Coyne Racing	Honda	110	+59.1041	3	10		13
18	6	(United States) Nolan Siegel	Arrow McLaren	Chevrolet	110	+59.4728	4	16		12
19	20	(United States) Alexander Rossi	ECR	Chevrolet	110	+1:00.7065	3	18		11
20	4	(Brazil) Caio Collet R	A.J. Foyt Enterprises	Chevrolet	109	+1 Lap	3	24		10
21	14	(United States) Santino Ferrucci	A.J. Foyt Enterprises	Chevrolet	109	+1 Lap	4	21		9
22	77	(United States) Sting Ray Robb	Juncos Hollinger Racing	Chevrolet	109	+1 Lap	4	23		8
23	15	(United States) Graham Rahal	Rahal Letterman Lanigan Racing	Honda	109	+1 Lap	4	8		7
24	21	(Denmark) Christian Rasmussen	ECR	Chevrolet	106	+4 Laps	3	19		6
25	66	(New Zealand) Marcus Armstrong	Meyer Shank Racing with Curb-Agajanian	Honda	33	Mechanical	1	20		5
Fastest lap: (Sweden) Marcus Ericsson (Andretti Global) – 1:00.3070 (Lap 5)
Official Results

== Championship standings after the race ==
Drivers' Championship standings

	Pos.	Driver	Points
Unchanged	1	(Spain) Álex Palou	510
Plus	2	(United States) Kyle Kirkwood	400 (-110)
Minus	3	(United States) David Malukas	392 (-118)
Unchanged	4	(Denmark) Christian Lundgaard	375 (-135)
Unchanged	5	(Mexico) Pato O'Ward	355 (-155)

Engine manufacturer standings

	Pos.	Manufacturer	Points
Unchanged	1	Honda	1129
Unchanged	2	Chevrolet	996 (–133)

- Note: Only the top five positions are included.

Previous race: 2026 Borchetta Bourbon Music City Grand Prix	IndyCar Series; 2026 season	Next race: 2026 Ontario Honda Dealers Indy Markham
Previous race: 2025 BitNile.com Grand Prix of Portland	Grand Prix of Portland	Next race: 2027 OnlyBulls Grand Prix of Portland
