= 2024 BitNile.com Grand Prix of Portland =

Indycar race held in Portland, Oregon

(United States) 2024 BitNile.com Grand Prix of Portland
Race details
14th round of the 2024 IndyCar season
← Previous race	Next race →
- Layout of the Portland International Raceway
- Date: August 25, 2024
- Official name: BitNile.com Grand Prix of Portland
- Location: Portland International Raceway, Portland, Oregon
- Course: Permanent road course 1.964 mi / 3.161 km
- Distance: 110 laps 216.04 mi / 347.68 km

Pole position
- Driver: (United States) Santino Ferrucci (A. J. Foyt Enterprises)
- Time: 58.2046

Fastest lap
- Driver: (United States) David Malukas (Meyer Shank Racing)
- Time: 59.7452 (on lap 16 of 110)

Podium
- First: (Australia) Will Power (Team Penske)
- Second: (Spain) Álex Palou (Chip Ganassi Racing)
- Third: (United States) Josef Newgarden (Team Penske)

Chronology
Previous	Next
2023	2025

The 2024 BitNile.com Grand Prix of Portland was the 14th event of the 2024 IndyCar season. The race was held on August 25, 2024, in Portland, Oregon at Portland International Raceway. The race took the scheduled 110 laps to complete and was won by Will Power.

== Practice ==
=== Practice 1 ===
Top Practice Speeds
Pos	No.	Driver	Team	Engine	Lap Time
1	3	(New Zealand) Scott McLaughlin	Team Penske	Chevrolet	00:58.3669
2	10	(Spain) Álex Palou	Chip Ganassi Racing	Honda	00:58.4337
3	11	(New Zealand) Marcus Armstrong	Chip Ganassi Racing	Honda	00:58.6095

=== Practice 2 ===
Top Practice Speeds
Pos	No.	Driver	Team	Engine	Lap Time
1	3	(New Zealand) Scott McLaughlin	Team Penske	Chevrolet	00:58.8605
2	60	(United States) David Malukas	Meyer Shank Racing	Honda	00:58.8868
3	2	(United States) Josef Newgarden	Team Penske	Chevrolet	00:58.8942

=== Final Practice ===
Top Practice Speeds
Pos	No.	Driver	Team	Engine	Lap Time
1	26	(United States) Colton Herta	Andretti Global with Curb-Agajanian	Honda	00:59.0031
2	10	(Spain) Álex Palou	Chip Ganassi Racing	Honda	00:59.2041
3	11	(New Zealand) Marcus Armstrong	Chip Ganassi Racing	Honda	00:59.2503

== Qualifying ==
=== Qualifying classification ===
Pos	No.	Driver	Team	Engine	Time	Final grid							
Pos	No.	Driver	Team	Engine	Time	Final grid	1	14	(United States) Santino Ferrucci	A. J. Foyt Enterprises	Chevrolet	58.2046	1
Pos	No.	Driver	Team	Engine	Time	Final grid	2	12	(Australia) Will Power	Team Penske	Chevrolet	58.3120	2
3	10	(Spain) Álex Palou	Chip Ganassi Racing	Honda	58.4316	3							
4	45	(Denmark) Christian Lundgaard	Rahal Letterman Lanigan Racing	Honda	58.5809	4							
5	27	(United States) Kyle Kirkwood	Andretti Global	Honda	58.5960	11*							
6	15	(United States) Graham Rahal	Rahal Letterman Lanigan Racing	Honda	58.6332	12*							
7	2	(United States) Josef Newgarden	Team Penske	Chevrolet	58.4163	5							
8	77	(France) Romain Grosjean	Juncos Hollinger Racing	Chevrolet	58.4494	6							
9	11	(New Zealand) Marcus Armstrong	Chip Ganassi Racing	Honda	58.4518	7							
10	26	(United States) Colton Herta	Andretti Global	Honda	58.4593	8							
11	9	(New Zealand) Scott Dixon	Chip Ganassi Racing	Honda	58.4772	9							
12	28	(Sweden) Marcus Ericsson	Andretti Global	Honda	58.5044	10							
13	30	(Brazil) Pietro Fittipaldi	Rahal Letterman Lanigan Racing	Honda	58.4955	13							
14	3	(New Zealand) Scott McLaughlin	Team Penske	Chevrolet	58.4489	20*							
15	21	(Netherlands) Rinus VeeKay	Ed Carpenter Racing	Chevrolet	58.5074	14							
16	75	(Estonia) Jüri Vips R	Rahal Letterman Lanigan Racing	Honda	58.6209	15							
17	20	(Denmark) Christian Rasmussen R	Ed Carpenter Racing	Chevrolet	58.5493	16							
18	7	(United States) Alexander Rossi	Arrow McLaren	Chevrolet	58.6822	17							
19	66	(United States) David Malukas	Meyer Shank Racing	Honda	58.6299	25*							
20	60	(Sweden) Felix Rosenqvist	Meyer Shank Racing	Honda	58.7179	18							
21	51	(United Kingdom) Toby Sowery R	Dale Coyne Racing	Honda	58.7204	19							
22	8	(Sweden) Linus Lundqvist R	Chip Ganassi Racing	Honda	58.7726	21							
23	5	(Mexico) Pato O'Ward	Arrow McLaren	Chevrolet	58.7903	22							
24	6	(United States) Nolan Siegel R	Arrow McLaren	Chevrolet	58.8205	23							
25	41	(United States) Sting Ray Robb	A. J. Foyt Enterprises	Chevrolet	58.8687	24							
26	4	(Cayman Islands) Kyffin Simpson R	Chip Ganassi Racing	Honda	58.8525	28*							
27	78	(United States) Conor Daly	Juncos Hollinger Racing	Chevrolet	58.9721	26							
28	18	(United Kingdom) Jack Harvey	Dale Coyne Racing	Honda	59.1787	27							

Note: * = took a six-place grid penalty due to an unapproved engine change

== Race ==
The race started at 12:00 PM PT on August 25, 2024.

=== Race classification ===
Pos	No.	Driver	Team	Engine	Laps	Total Time	Pit Stops	Grid	Laps Led	Pts.
1	12	(Australia) Will Power	Team Penske	Chevrolet	110	01:55:34.1948	3	2	101	53
2	10	(Spain) Álex Palou	Chip Ganassi Racing	Honda	110	01:55:44.0215	3	3	3	41
3	2	(United States) Josef Newgarden	Team Penske	Chevrolet	110	01:55:57.3994	3	5	1	36
4	26	(United States) Colton Herta	Andretti Global	Honda	110	01:56:11.2987	3	8	4	33
5	11	(New Zealand) Marcus Armstrong	Chip Ganassi Racing	Honda	110	01:56:12.2282	3	7	1	31
6	28	(Sweden) Marcus Ericsson	Andretti Global	Honda	110	01:56:14.9635	3	10	-	28
7	3	(New Zealand) Scott McLaughlin	Team Penske	Chevrolet	110	01:56:16.5446	3	20	-	26
8	14	(United States) Santino Ferrucci	A. J. Foyt Enterprises	Chevrolet	110	01:56:19.0504	3	1	-	25
9	15	(United States) Graham Rahal	Rahal Letterman Lanigan Racing	Honda	110	01:56:23.7759	3	12	-	22
10	27	(United States) Kyle Kirkwood	Andretti Global	Honda	110	01:56:25.1935	3	11	-	20
11	21	(Netherlands) Rinus VeeKay	Ed Carpenter Racing	Chevrolet	110	01:56:26.3708	3	14	-	19
12	7	(United States) Alexander Rossi	Arrow McLaren	Chevrolet	110	01:56:26.6927	3	17	-	18
13	45	(Denmark) Christian Lundgaard	Rahal Letterman Lanigan Racing	Honda	110	01:56:29.6915	3	4	-	17
14	60	(Sweden) Felix Rosenqvist	Meyer Shank Racing	Honda	110	01:56:30.9554	3	18	-	16
15	5	(Mexico) Pato O'Ward	Arrow McLaren	Chevrolet	110	01:56:32.5878	3	22	-	15
16	4	(Cayman Islands) Kyffin Simpson R	Chip Ganassi Racing	Honda	110	01:56:33.6799	3	28	-	14
17	51	(United Kingdom) Toby Sowery R	Dale Coyne Racing	Honda	109	01:55:41.8278	3	19	-	13
18	41	(United States) Sting Ray Robb	A. J. Foyt Enterprises	Chevrolet	109	01:55:50.3948	3	24	-	12
19	75	(Estonia) Jüri Vips R	Rahal Letterman Lanigan Racing	Honda	109	01:55:51.5976	3	15	-	11
20	66	(United States) David Malukas	Meyer Shank Racing	Honda	109	01:55:56.2806	3	25	-	10
21	6	(United States) Nolan Siegel R	Arrow McLaren	Chevrolet	109	01:56:05.2629	4	23	-	9
22	78	(United States) Conor Daly	Juncos Hollinger Racing	Chevrolet	109	01:56:05.9333	3	26	-	8
23	8	(Sweden) Linus Lundqvist R	Chip Ganassi Racing	Honda	109	01:56:06.0097	4	21	-	7
24	18	(United Kingdom) Jack Harvey	Dale Coyne Racing	Honda	109	01:56:08.9787	3	27	-	6
25	30	(Brazil) Pietro Fittipaldi	Rahal Letterman Lanigan Racing	Honda	109	01:56:10.6786	3	13	-	5
26	20	(Denmark) Christian Rasmussen R	Ed Carpenter Racing	Chevrolet	108	01:55:47.7240	3	16	-	5
27	77	(France) Romain Grosjean	Juncos Hollinger Racing	Chevrolet	107	01:55:45.8508	4	6	-	5
28	9	(New Zealand) Scott Dixon	Chip Ganassi Racing	Honda	0	Contact	-	9	-	5
Fastest lap: (United States) David Malukas (Meyer Shank Racing) – 59:7462 (lap 16)
Official Results
