= Dave O'Neill =

British motorsports executive

- Citizenship: British
- Occupation: Motorsports Executive
- Employer: Juncos Hollinger Racing
- Title: Team Principal

Dave O'Neill is a British Formula One and motorsport executive. He is currently the Team Principal for the Juncos Hollinger Racing IndyCar Series team.

== Career ==
O’Neill began his motorsport career working in Ralt. He moved to Formula One in 1998 joining Jordan Grand Prix as a senior mechanic. Eventually he rose up to be Chief Mechanic on the Test Team and then Test Team Manager, overseeing the test team logistics and operational delivery. In 2005 he moved to the race team in an almost identical role.

In late 2005, he was appointed Team Manager of A1 Team Ireland, tasked with establishing the team from its inception. Under his leadership, the team transitioned to Ferrari engines and went on to win the A1 Grand Prix World Championship.

O’Neill returned to Formula One in 2009 as Team Manager at the Virgin Racing team which later evolved into Marussia F1. He played a central role in setting up the team's UK operations. He led the recruitment of personnel, managed the design and build of the team's technical centre, and oversaw logistics, supplier selection and operational delivery under strict budgetary constraints.

From 2014 to 2017, O’Neill served as Sporting Director and Team Manager at the Haas F1 Team, where he was instrumental in establishing the first US-based Formula One team to compete since the 1970s. His responsibilities included day-to-day team operations, global logistics, internal coordination across multiple workstreams, infrastructure development and budget management.

Following his Formula One career, O’Neill moved into team principal roles in US-based motorsport, including leadership positions with Esses Racing and Juncos Hollinger Racing.
