= 2026 Mission Grand Prix of Monterey =

IndyCar race held in Monterey, California

(United States) 2026 Mission Grand Prix of Monterey
Race details
18th round of the 2026 IndyCar season
← Previous race
- Layout of WeatherTech Raceway Laguna Seca
- Date: September 6, 2026
- Official name: Mission Grand Prix of Monterey
- Location: WeatherTech Raceway Laguna Seca, Monterey, California
- Course: Permanent racing facility 2.238 mi / 3.602 km
- Distance: 95 laps 212.61 mi / 342.163 km

Pole position
- Driver: (New Zealand) Scott McLaughlin (Team Penske)
- Time: 01:09.1363

Fastest lap
- Driver: (Netherlands) Rinus Veekay (Juncos Hollinger Racing)
- Time: 01:11.6544 (on lap 38 of 95)

Podium
- First: (New Zealand) Scott McLaughlin (Team Penske)
- Second: (United States) Kyle Kirkwood (Andretti Global with Curb-Agajanian)
- Third: (United States) Alexander Rossi (ECR)

Chronology
Previous	Next
2025	2027

The 2026 Mission Grand Prix of Monterey was the eighteenth and final round of the 2026 IndyCar season. The race was held on September 6, 2026 near Monterey, California at WeatherTech Raceway Laguna Seca. The race was contested over 95 laps (212.61 miles / 342.16 km).

== Race background ==
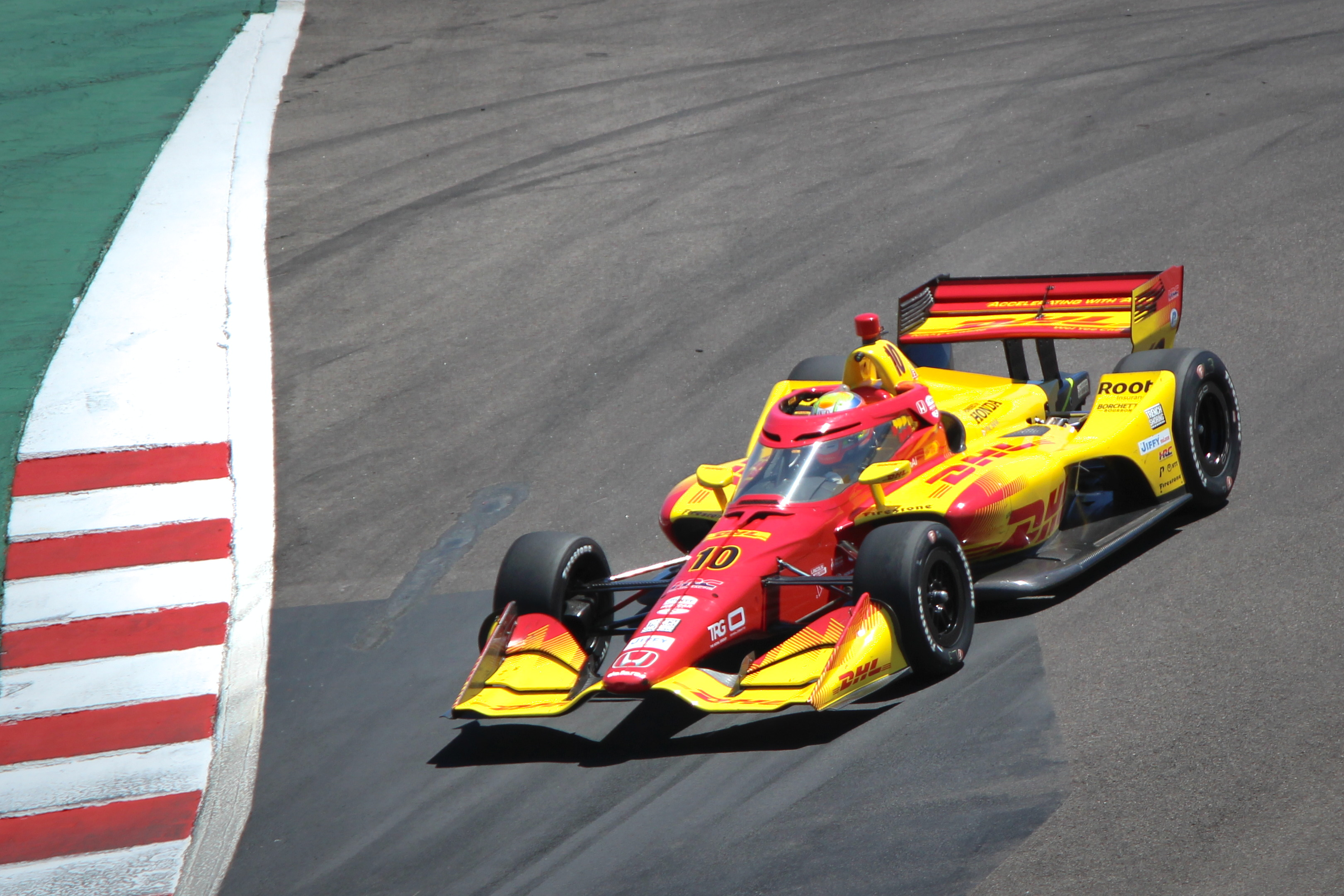
The infamous corkscrew at Laguna Seca, the track where the race was held.

The Mission Grand Prix of Monterey is held at WeatherTech Raceway Laguna Seca in Monterey, California on its 11-turn road course layout. A 2.238 mi (3.602 km) track, it was the final points-paying race of the NTT IndyCar Series.IndyCar is a formula for professional-level, single-seat, open cockpit, open-wheel race cars.

=== Championship standings before the race ===
Álex Palou had clinched the 2026 IndyCar Series points championship at Milwaukee, with a 100-point lead over Christian Lundgaard. Palou led the drivers this season with six victories and eight pole positions before the race. Kyle Kirkwood, Josef Newgarden, Christian Lundgaard, and Pato O'Ward had two wins each going into the race. Marcus Ericsson, and Indy 500 winner Felix Rosenqvist each had one win.

== Entry list ==
Key	Meaning
R	Rookie
W	Past winner

No.	Driver	Team	Engine
2	(United States) Josef Newgarden	Team Penske	Chevrolet
3	(New Zealand) Scott McLaughlin	Team Penske	Chevrolet
4	(Brazil) Caio Collet R	A.J. Foyt Racing	Chevrolet
5	(Mexico) Pato O'Ward	Arrow McLaren	Chevrolet
6	(United States) Nolan Siegel	Arrow McLaren	Chevrolet
7	(Denmark) Christian Lundgaard	Arrow McLaren	Chevrolet
8	(Cayman Islands) Kyffin Simpson	Chip Ganassi Racing	Honda
9	(New Zealand) Scott Dixon W	Chip Ganassi Racing	Honda
10	(Spain) Álex Palou W	Chip Ganassi Racing	Honda
12	(United States) David Malukas	Team Penske	Chevrolet
14	(United States) Santino Ferrucci	A. J. Foyt Racing	Chevrolet
15	(United States) Graham Rahal	Rahal Letterman Lanigan Racing	Honda
18	(France) Romain Grosjean	Dale Coyne Racing	Honda
19	(Norway) Dennis Hauger R	Dale Coyne Racing	Honda
20	(United States) Alexander Rossi	ECR	Chevrolet
21	(Denmark) Christian Rasmussen	ECR	Chevrolet
26	(Australia) Will Power	Andretti Global	Honda
27	(United States) Kyle Kirkwood	Andretti Global with Curb-Agajanian	Honda
28	(Sweden) Marcus Ericsson	Andretti Global	Honda
45	(United Kingdom) Louis Foster	Rahal Letterman Lanigan Racing	Honda
47	(Germany) Mick Schumacher R	Rahal Letterman Lanigan Racing	Honda
60	(Sweden) Felix Rosenqvist	Meyer Shank Racing with Curb-Agajanian	Honda
66	(New Zealand) Marcus Armstrong	Meyer Shank Racing with Curb-Agajanian	Honda
76	(Netherlands) Rinus VeeKay	Juncos Hollinger Racing	Chevrolet
77	(United States) Sting Ray Robb	Juncos Hollinger Racing	Chevrolet

== Practice ==
=== Practice 1 ===
The first practice session was held on Friday, September 4, at 2:00 PM PST.

Top Practice Speeds
Pos	No.	Driver	Team	Engine	Lap Time
1	10	(Spain) Álex Palou W	Chip Ganassi Racing	Honda	1:09.8994
2	60	(Sweden) Felix Rosenqvist	Meyer Shank Racing	Honda	1:09.9907
3	5	(Mexico) Pato O'Ward	Arrow McLaren	Chevrolet	1:10.1764
Official Report

=== Practice 2 ===
The second practice session was held on Saturday, September 5, at 10:00 AM PST.

Top Practice Speeds
Pos	No.	Driver	Team	Engine	Lap Time
1	3	(New Zealand) Scott McLaughlin	Team Penske	Chevrolet	1:10.3014
2	60	(Sweden) Felix Rosenqvist	Meyer Shank Racing	Honda	1:10.5433
3	10	(Spain) Álex Palou W	Chip Ganassi Racing	Honda	1:10.5575
Official Report

== Qualifying ==
Qualifying was held at 1:30 PM PST on September 5, 2026.

=== Qualifying classification ===
Pos	No.	Driver	Team	Engine	Time	Final grid							
Pos	No.	Driver	Team	Engine	Time	Final grid	1	3	(New Zealand) Scott McLaughlin	Team Penske	Chevrolet	1:09.1363	1
Pos	No.	Driver	Team	Engine	2	Final grid	10	(Spain) Álex Palou W	Chip Ganassi Racing	Honda	1:09.1540	2	
3	60	(Sweden) Felix Rosenqvist	Meyer Shank Racing	Honda	1:09.1931	3							
4	20	(United States) Alexander Rossi	ECR	Chevrolet	1:09.3247	4							
5	7	(Denmark) Christian Lundgaard	Arrow McLaren	Chevrolet	1:10.2227	11							
6	12	(United States) David Malukas	Team Penske	Chevrolet	1:12.8461	5							
7	27	(United States) Kyle Kirkwood	Andretti Global	Honda	1:09.5726	6							
8	28	(Sweden) Marcus Ericsson	Andretti Global	Honda	1:09.6961	14							
9	8	(Cayman Islands) Kyffin Simpson	Chip Ganassi Racing	Honda	1:09.6993	7							
10	66	(New Zealand) Marcus Armstrong	Meyer Shank Racing with Curb Agajanian	Honda	1:09.9951	8							
11	45	(United Kingdom) Louis Foster	Rahal Letterman Lanigan Racing	Honda	1:10.1123	9							
12	4	(Brazil) Caio Collet R	A.J. Foyt Racing	Chevrolet	1:10.1446	18							
13	5	(Mexico) Pato O'Ward	Arrow McLaren	Chevrolet	1:09.5544	10							
14	26	(Australia) Will Power	Andretti Global	Honda	1:09.8617	12							
15	47	(Germany) Mick Schumacher R	Rahal Letterman Lanigan Racing	Honda	1:09.5721	13							
16	6	(United States) Nolan Siegel	Arrow McLaren	Chevrolet	1:09.8620	15							
17	9	(New Zealand) Scott Dixon W	Chip Ganassi Racing	Honda	1:09.6184	16							
18	21	(Denmark) Christian Rasmussen	ECR	Chevrolet	1:09.8726	17							
19	76	(Netherlands) Rinus VeeKay	Juncos Hollinger Racing	Chevrolet	1:09.8411	19							
20	2	(United States) Josef Newgarden	Team Penske	Chevrolet	1:09.9549	20							
21	14	(United States) Santino Ferrucci	A. J. Foyt Racing	Chevrolet	1:09.9460	21							
22	15	(United States) Graham Rahal	Rahal Letterman Lanigan Racing	Honda	1:09.9593	22							
23	18	(France) Romain Grosjean	Dale Coyne Racing	Honda	1:10.3840	23							
24	19	(Norway) Dennis Hauger R	Dale Coyne Racing	Honda	1:09.9611	24							
25	77	(United States) Sting Ray Robb	Juncos Hollinger Racing	Chevrolet	1:10.1619	25							
Official Report

== Post-qualifying practice ==
The final practice session was held on Saturday, September 5, at 5:00 PM PST.

Top Practice Speeds
Pos	No.	Driver	Team	Engine	Lap Time
1	60	(Sweden) Felix Rosenqvist	Meyer Shank Racing	Honda	1:10.4275
2	47	(Germany) Mick Schumacher R	Rahal Letterman Lanigan Racing	Honda	1:10.7058
3	3	(New Zealand) Scott McLaughlin	Team Penske	Chevrolet	1:10.8351
Official Report

== Race ==
The race was held at 11:30 AM PST on September 6, 2026.

=== Race classification ===
Pos	No.	Driver	Team	Engine	Laps	Time/Retired	Pit Stops	Grid	Laps Led	Pts.
1	3	(New Zealand) Scott McLaughlin	Team Penske	Chevrolet	95	1:59:29.6163	3	1	87	54
2	27	(United States) Kyle Kirkwood	Andretti Global	Honda	95	+1.3739	3	6		40
3	20	(United States) Alexander Rossi	ECR	Chevrolet	95	+2.8108	3	4	4	36
4	60	(Sweden) Felix Rosenqvist	Meyer Shank Racing	Honda	95	+5.2886	3	3	2	33
5	12	(United States) David Malukas	Team Penske	Chevrolet	95	+14.5880	3	5		30
6	7	(Denmark) Christian Lundgaard	Arrow McLaren	Chevrolet	95	16.5000	3	11		28
7	66	(New Zealand) Marcus Armstrong	Meyer Shank Racing with Curb Agajanian	Honda	95	+21.8125	3	8	2	27
8	10	(Spain) Álex Palou W	Chip Ganassi Racing	Honda	95	+28.0442	4	2		24
9	28	(Sweden) Marcus Ericsson	Andretti Global	Honda	95	+40.2262	3	14		22
10	8	(Cayman Islands) Kyffin Simpson	Chip Ganassi Racing	Honda	95	+40.7676	3	7		20
11	5	(Mexico) Pato O'Ward	Arrow McLaren	Chevrolet	95	+43.0208	3	10		19
12	14	(United States) Santino Ferrucci	A. J. Foyt Racing	Chevrolet	95	+43.7468	3	21		18
13	26	(Australia) Will Power	Andretti Global	Honda	95	+49.3535	3	12		17
14	45	(United Kingdom) Louis Foster	Rahal Letterman Lanigan Racing	Honda	95	+53.4054	3	9		16
15	2	(United States) Josef Newgarden	Team Penske	Chevrolet	95	+55.1028	5	20		15
16	76	(Netherlands) Rinus VeeKay	Juncos Hollinger Racing	Chevrolet	95	+55.7301	4	19		14
17	9	(New Zealand) Scott Dixon W	Chip Ganassi Racing	Honda	95	+57.6243	4	16		13
18	18	(France) Romain Grosjean	Dale Coyne Racing	Honda	95	+1:00.6920	3	23		12
19	15	(United States) Graham Rahal	Rahal Letterman Lanigan Racing	Honda	95	+1:04.6683	4	22		11
20	4	(Brazil) Caio Collet R	A.J. Foyt Racing	Chevrolet	95	+1:08.1740	3	18		10
21	21	(Denmark) Christian Rasmussen	ECR	Chevrolet	95	+1:09.1276	4	17		9
22	47	(Germany) Mick Schumacher R	Rahal Letterman Lanigan Racing	Honda	95	+1:10.7713	4	13		8
23	77	(United States) Sting Ray Robb	Juncos Hollinger Racing	Chevrolet	94	+1 Lap	5	25		7
24	6	(United States) Nolan Siegel	Arrow McLaren	Chevrolet	94	+1 Lap	4	15		6
25	19	(Norway) Dennis Hauger R	Dale Coyne Racing	Honda	0	Contact	0	24		5
Fastest lap: (Netherlands) Rinus VeeKay (Juncos Hollinger Racing) 1:11.6544(Lap 38)
Official Results

== Championship standings after the race ==
Drivers' Championship standings

	Pos.	Driver	Points
Unchanged	1	(Spain) Álex Palou	631
Plus	2	(United States) Kyle Kirkwood	545 (–86)
Minus	3	(Denmark) Christian Lundgaard	535 (–96)
Unchanged	4	(Mexico) Pato O'Ward	522 (–109)
Unchanged	5	(United States) David Malukas	514 (–117)

Engine manufacturer standings

	Pos.	Manufacturer	Points
Unchanged	1	Honda	1571
Unchanged	2	Chevrolet	1216

- Note: Only the top five positions are included.

Previous race: 2026 Snap-on IndyCar Weekend	IndyCar Series; 2026 season	Next race: 2027 Firestone Grand Prix of St. Petersburg
Previous race: 2025 Java House Grand Prix of Monterey	Mission Grand Prix of Monterey	Next race: 2027 Mission Grand Prix of Monterey
