= Juncos Hollinger Racing =

American-Argentine auto racing team

(Argentina) (United States) Juncos Hollinger Racing
- Owner(s): Ricardo Juncos; Brad Hollinger
- Principal(s): Dave O'Neill
- Base: Indianapolis, Indiana
- Series: IndyCar Series
- Race drivers: IndyCar Series: 76. TBA; 77. TBA; Indy NXT; 75. TBA; 76. TBA
- Manufacturer: IndyCar Series: Chevrolet
- Opened: 1997

Career
- Debut: 2017 Indianapolis 500 (Indianapolis)
- Races competed: 15
- Drivers' Championships: Indy NXT: 2015: Spencer Pigot; 2017: Kyle Kaiser; Indy Pro 2000 Championship: 2010: Conor Daly; 2014: Spencer Pigot; 2017: Victor Franzoni; 2018: Rinus VeeKay; 2020: Sting Ray Robb
- Indy 500 victories: 0
- Race victories: 0
- Pole positions: 0

Juncos Hollinger Racing (abbreviated JHR, /ˈdʒʌŋkoʊs/, Spanish: [ˈxun.kos]), formerly Juncos Racing, is an Argentine-American racing team competing in the IndyCar Series and Indy NXT. Owned by Ricardo Juncos, who formed the team in 1997, the team was initially based in Argentina before limited racing opportunities in that country led to the team moving to the United States. The team is currently based in Indianapolis, Indiana. Following Williams F1 shareholder Brad Hollinger's entry to the team as partner in 2021, the team was renamed to Juncos Hollinger Racing.

== Ricardo Juncos ==
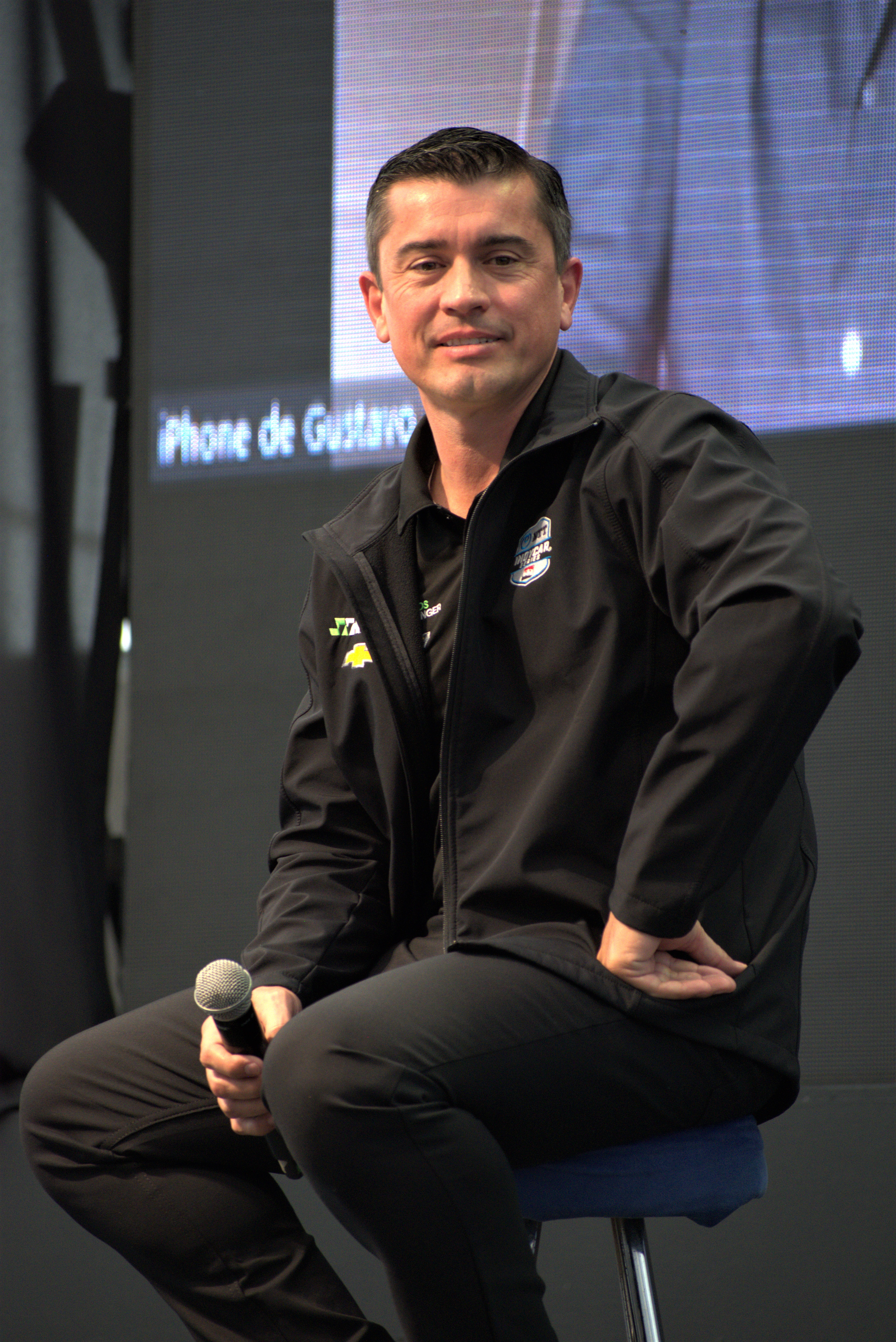
Ricardo Juncos, founder of the team.

Ricardo Juncos is a second-generation and former Formula Renault driver. At the age of 14, Juncos made his first steps in the racing community driving karts in Argentina. Through his success in karts, Juncos was able to join the Formula Renault class, competing throughout South America. After funding became difficult, Juncos began working for many race teams to continue his racing career. During this time, Juncos was able to learn all aspects of the car in and out, along with schooling in mechanical and electrical engineering.

== Racing history ==
=== Argentina to the United States ===
Stationed in Buenos Aires, Argentina and headed by Ricardo Juncos, Juncos Racing became a full-service formula racing team in 1997. The team competed from 1997 through 2003 in the Formula Renault 1600 Championship, Formula Renault 2000 Championship, and the National Sport Prototype Championship of Argentina. In 2003, the team relocated to Miami, Florida as a full-service karting team. During the first few years in the U.S., the team picked up 19 local, regional, and national karting titles. Juncos Racing moved operations north to Indiana, where they developed into a formula open-wheel racing team in 2008. After being formed in 1997 by Ricardo Juncos in Argentina, the team competed from 1997 through 2003 in the Formula Renault 1600 Championship, Formula Renault 2000 Championship, and the National Sport Prototype Championship of Argentina.

=== Indy Pro 2000 Championship ===
==== Star Mazda era (2009–2012) ====
In 2009, the team entered the Star Mazda series. The team was surprisingly strong in its first season, finishing second in the driver's championship and third in the team championship with driver Peter Dempsey. In 2010 Juncos driver Conor Daly won the Star Mazda Championship, winning seven of the thirteen races. Juncos' other driver Tatiana Calderón finished tenth. In 2011 Daly left the team to advance to the Indy Lights series, and the team replaced him with driver João Victor Horto. Horto would finish the season fourth and Calderón sixth. Calderón finished third in the race at Barber Motorsports Park, becoming the first woman to achieve a podium finish in the series.

In 2012 Calderón left to race in the Formula Three series in Europe. Horto and Juncos moved up to the Indy Lights series on a limited basis, while the team signed Connor De Phillippi, Bruno Palli, Martin Scuncio, and Diego Ferreira for their Star Mazda cars. De Phillippi would win two races and finish fourth, while Scuncio would win one race and finish eighth after missing the season finale. Ferreira would finish sixth and Palli twelfth. Ferreira was named "Most Improved Driver of the Year.

==== Pro Mazda Championship era (2013–2018) ====
In 2013, the team would enter Ferreira and Scott Anderson in the series, now renamed the Pro Mazda Championship. Ferreira would finish second behind a dominant Matthew Brabham. Anderson finished fifth.

For 2014 the team entered four cars full-time in the series, driven by Spencer Pigot, Kyle Kaiser, Julia Ballario, and Jose Gutiérrez. Juncos Racing started the year off on a high note, winning the Cooper Tires Winterfest Championship in both the team and driver (Spencer Pigot) championship. Pigot went on to win six of the fourteen races en route to a championship. Kaiser and Gutiérrez both took wins in the season finale at Sonoma. For 2015, Gutierrez returned to the team along with new drivers Will Owen, Timothé Buret and Garett Grist, who moved over from Andretti Autosport.

==== Indy Pro 2000 Championship era (2019–2022) ====
In 2019, the championship was rebranded into "Indy Pro 2000", following the departure of Mazda. The team would win the teams' championship that year, with Swedish driver Rasmus Lindh narrowly missing the top spot in the drivers' championship, finishing only 2 points behind champion Kyle Kirkwood.

The team's 2020 season saw American driver Sting Ray Robb clinch the drivers' title with two races remaining in the season.

=== Indy NXT ===
The team made its first attempt to field a car in the Indy Lights series (the next series above Pro-Mazda) in 2012, with one car which was limited to six of the twelve races with three different drivers taking the wheel.

In November 2014, the team announced it would be fielding two cars full-time in the series for 2015 and would be elevating drivers Spencer Pigot and Kyle Kaiser from Pro Mazda to be the drivers. Pigot began the 2015 season with five straight podium appearances, including winning both races of the doubleheader at Barber Motorsports Park. With six wins and nine podiums in 16 races, he was crowned champion over Jack Harvey and Ed Jones.

The organization secured their second championship with Kyle Kaiser in 2017 after he obtained three wins and eight podiums, which earned Kaiser a $1 million scholarship to participate in the 2018 IndyCar Series.

In 2025, the team intended to field two cars in the 2025 Indy NXT. On November 1, 2024, they had signed Paraguayan racer Miguel María García to drive the No. 75 car full-time. However, on February 13, 2025, the team had announced that they would be pausing their Indy NXT program indefinitely to focus on their IndyCar program. This resulted in García losing his seat.

=== IndyCar Series ===
==== First stint in the series (2017–2019) ====
In May 2015, Ricardo Juncos announced the team would be building a new facility in Speedway, Indiana (home of the Indianapolis Motor Speedway), with the intention of future participation in the IndyCar Series. The facility, called the Juncos Technical Center, would cost three million dollars and be 41,000 square feet in size. On May 9, 2017, it was announced that Spencer Pigot would rejoin Juncos for its IndyCar debut at the 2017 Indianapolis 500. The following day, the team announced veteran Sebastián Saavedra would drive a second entry for the team.

At the 2019 Indianapolis 500, Kyle Kaiser qualified the team's only entry for the last spot for the starting lineup. Kaiser's and Juncos' effort is remembered for knocking out two-time Formula One world champion Fernando Alonso from the starting line up for the Indianapolis 500. It ended Alonso's joint McLaren/Carlin effort and created an underdog story in the history of racing at Indianapolis Motor Speedway.

==== Return to IndyCar Series (2021–present) ====
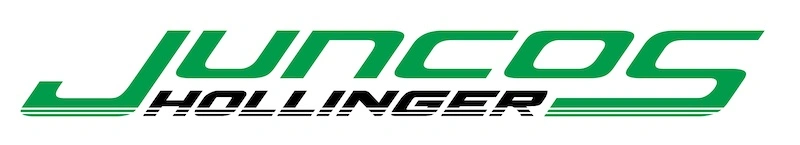
Juncos Hollinger Racing logo prior to 2023

The team did not participate in the 2020 season, citing difficulties due to the COVID-19 pandemic as a reason. For the 2021 Indianapolis 500 Juncos leased their chassis to Paretta Autosport on behalf of Team Penske, with Simona de Silvestro driving the car. De Silvestro managed to qualify the Juncos car in the last available spot for the Indianapolis 500 but ultimately retired from the race.

Following investment by new team co-owner Brad Hollinger, Juncos was renamed to Juncos Hollinger Racing and returned to the series with a single entry for the last three races of the 2021 season, starting from the Grand Prix of Portland. On September 10, 2021, 2020 Formula 2 Championship runner-up and Scuderia Ferrari Formula One test driver Callum Ilott was announced as their driver for the remaining three rounds of the 2021 season, after initially being confirmed only for one race. He would finish 25th on his IndyCar debut, completing only 77 out of 110 laps due to a mechanical issue mid-race.

Juncos Hollinger Racing returned full-time in 2022, after the purchase of assets previously owned by Carlin. Ilott continued to race the No. 77 entry in all races except for the Detroit Grand Prix, as he was recovering from injuries sustained in the previous week's Indianapolis 500, with Santino Ferrucci standing in for the Detroit round. Ilott would return to the No. 77 from the Road America race until the end of the season, finishing 20th in the championship.

In September 2022, the team confirmed an expansion to a two-car entry for the 2023 season. In January 2023, four-time Turismo Carretera champion Agustín Canapino was announced as JHR's second full-time driver in the No. 78 car.

The team would enter a strategic alliance and technical partnership with Arrow McLaren in October 2023. On October 26, 2023, Juncos Hollinger Racing announced the departure of driver Callum Ilott. In a statement, the team said, "After a period of collaboration and shared goals, both parties have mutually decided to part ways, effective immediately. Juncos Hollinger Racing would like to express its sincere appreciation for his contributions over the last two years." Ilott was replaced by Romain Grosjean for 2024, while Canapino was retained.

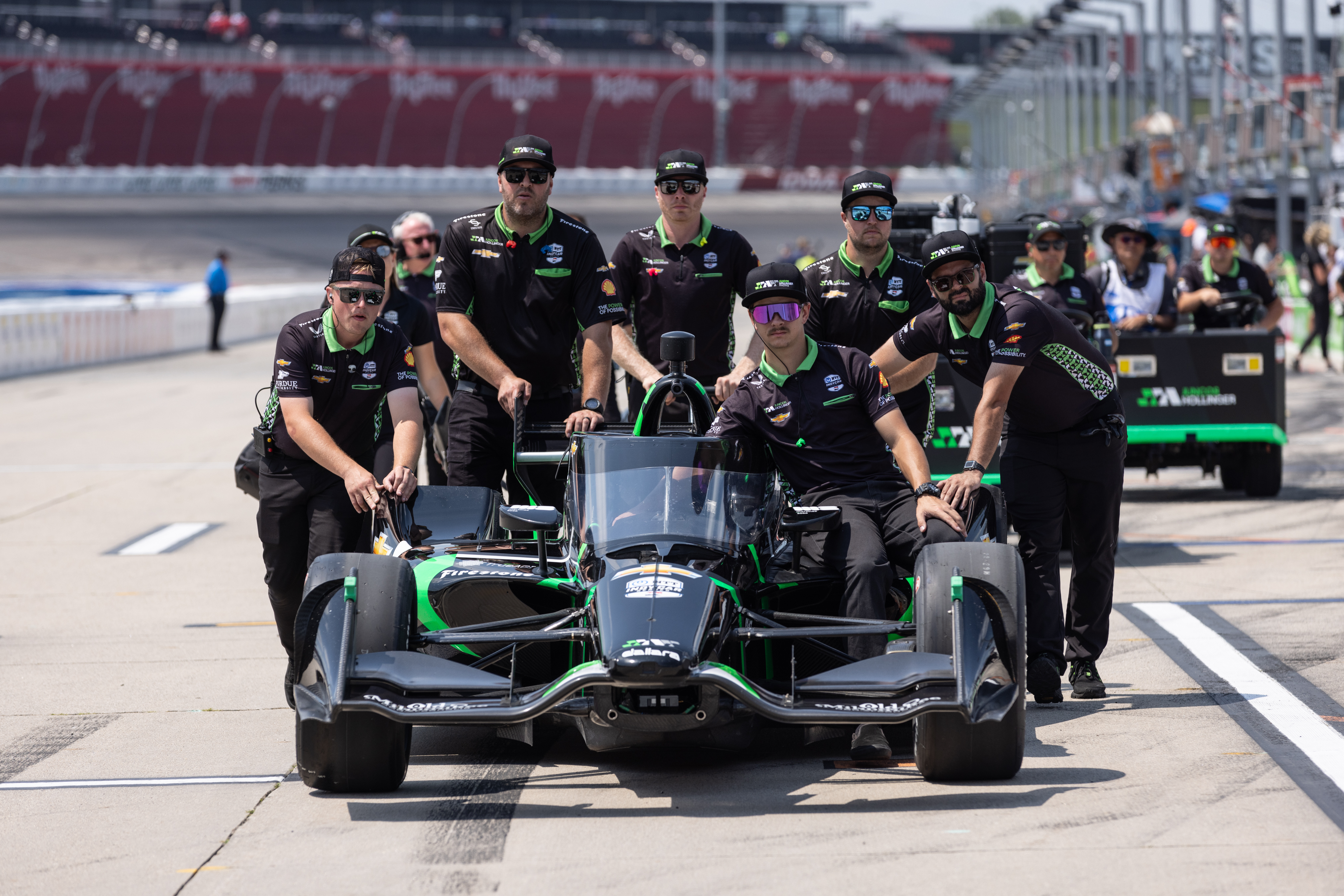
Juncos Hollinger Racing team gets into position at Iowa Speedway on July 16, 2024.

Following fan harassment and death threats towards Arrow McLaren driver Théo Pourchaire following an incident with Canapino at the Detroit Grand Prix and the ensuing social media furor and fallout, Arrow McLaren released a statement announcing the termination of their technical partnership with Juncos Hollinger Racing effective immediately. Canapino would soon after be withdrawn from competing at the 2024 XPEL Grand Prix of Road America, with the team stating he would be taking a "leave of absence"; he was replaced by Nolan Siegel at the event. Siegel was moved to Arrow McLaren for the 2025 season, with Sting Ray Robb replacing him.

Conor Daly earned the team's first-ever IndyCar podium finish in race one of the 2024 Hy-Vee Milwaukee Mile 250s after stepping into the #78 car for the final five races and helping the entry reach the Leaders' Circle.

In 2026, the team hired Rinus VeeKay to drive the #76 car, and VeeKay delivered the best season in team history, setting new team records for most top-10 finishes (8) and most top-5 finishes (4) in a season. He also delivered the team's second-ever Indycar podium finish, coming across the line third at race one of the 2026 Snap-on IndyCar Weekend. VeeKay finished 10th in the championship, easily the team's highest finish in the driver championship over Ilott's 16th-place finish in 2023.

== Drivers ==
=== IndyCar Series (2017–2019; 2021–present) ===
- (United States) Spencer Pigot (2017)
- (Colombia) Sebastián Saavedra (2017)
- (Austria) René Binder (2018)
- (Mexico) Alfonso Celis Jr. (2018)
- (United States) Kyle Kaiser (2018–2019)
- (United Kingdom) Callum Ilott (2021–2023)
- (United States) Santino Ferrucci (2022)
- (Argentina) Agustín Canapino (2023–2024)
- (France) Romain Grosjean (2024)
- (United States) Nolan Siegel (2024)
- (United States) Conor Daly (2024–2025)
- (United States) Sting Ray Robb (2025–present)
- (Netherlands) Rinus VeeKay (2026–present)

=== Indy NXT (2012, 2015–2019, 2021, 2023–2024, 2026) ===
- (Brazil) João Victor Horto (2012)
- (United States) Chase Austin (2012)
- (Venezuela) Bruno Palli (2012)
- (United States) Kyle Kaiser (2015–2017)
- (United States) Spencer Pigot (2015)
- (Canada) Zachary Claman DeMelo (2016)
- (Argentina) Nicolas Dapero (2017)
- (Mexico) Alfonso Celis Jr. (2018)
- (South Korea) Heamin Choi (2018)
- (Brazil) Victor Franzoni (2018, 2023)
- (Netherlands) Rinus VeeKay (2019)
- (Canada) Dalton Kellett (2019)
- (United States) Sting Ray Robb (2021)
- (United Kingdom) Toby Sowery (2021)
- (Sweden) Rasmus Lindh (2021, 2023)
- (United States) Reece Gold (2023)
- (Italy) Matteo Nannini (2023)
- (Australia) Matthew Brabham (2023)
- (United States) Lindsay Brewer (2024)
- (Mexico) Ricardo Escotto (2024, 2026)
- (United States) Alexander Koreiba (2026)

=== Indy Pro 2000 Championship (2009–2022) ===
- (Canada) Michael Furfari (2009)
- (United States) Walt Bowlin (2009)
- (United States) Sean Burstyn (2009–2010)
- (Republic of Ireland) Peter Dempsey (2009)
- (Japan) Toshi Deki (2009)
- (United States) Conor Daly (2010)
- (United States) Rusty Mitchell (2010)
- (United States) Hayden Duerson (2010)
- (Colombia) Tatiana Calderón (2010–2011)
- (Chile) Martin Scuncio (2010–2012)
- (Brazil) João Victor Horto (2011)
- (United States) Gustavo Menezes (2011)
- (Venezuela) Bruno Palli (2012)
- (Venezuela) Diego Ferreira (2012–2013)
- (United States) Scott Anderson (2013)
- (Argentina) Julia Ballario (2013–2014)
- (Mexico) Jose Gutierrez (2013–2015)
- (United States) Spencer Pigot (2014)
- (United States) Kyle Kaiser (2014)
- (France) Timothé Buret (2015)
- (United States) Will Owen (2015–2016)
- (Canada) Garett Grist (2015–2016)
- (Argentina) Nicolas Dapero (2016)
- (Australia) Jake Parsons (2016)
- (Brazil) Victor Franzoni (2017)
- (United States) Jeff Green (2017)
- (Netherlands) Rinus VeeKay (2018)
- (United States) Robert Megennis (2018)
- (Sweden) Rasmus Lindh (2019)
- (United States) Sting Ray Robb (2019–2020)
- (Russia) Artem Petrov (2020)
- (United States) Reece Gold (2021–2022)
- (Mexico) Manuel Sulaimán (2021)
- (Cayman Islands) Kyffin Simpson (2021)
- (Pakistan) Enaam Ahmed (2021–2022)

== Complete series results ==
=== IndyCar Series ===
(key)

IndyCar Series results
Year	Chassis	Engine	Drivers	No.	1	2	3	4	5	6	7	8	9	10	11	12	13	14	15	16	17	18	Pts Pos	Pos
2017					STP	LBH	ALA	PHX	IMS	INDY	DET		TXS	ROA	IOW	TOR	MOH	POC	GAT	WGL	SNM			
2017	Dallara DW12	Chevrolet IndyCar V6t	(United States) Spencer Pigot	11						18													20th	218
2017	Dallara DW12	Chevrolet IndyCar V6t	(Colombia) Sebastián Saavedra^{1}	17						15													26th	80
2018					STP	PHX	LBH	ALA	IMS	INDY	DET		TXS	ROA	IOW	TOR	MOH	POC	GAT	POR	SNM			
2018	Dallara DW12	Chevrolet IndyCar V6t	(Austria) René Binder (R)	32	22			16			21	22				17	21						28th	61
2018	Dallara DW12	Chevrolet IndyCar V6t	(United States) Kyle Kaiser (R)	32		21	16		19	29													30th	45
2018	Dallara DW12	Chevrolet IndyCar V6t	(Mexico) Alfonso Celis Jr. (R)	32										20						17			36th	23
2019					STP	COA	ALA	LBH	IMS	INDY	DET		TXS	ROA	TOR	IOW	MOH	POC	GAT	POR	LAG			
2019	Dallara DW12	Chevrolet IndyCar V6t	(United States) Kyle Kaiser R	32		18				31													32nd	22
2021					ALA	STP	TXS		IMS	INDY	DET		ROA	MOH	NSH	IMS	GAT	POR	LAG	LBH				
2021	Dallara DW12	Chevrolet IndyCar V6t	(United Kingdom) Callum Ilott R	77														25	22	26			38th	18
2022					STP	TXS	LBH	ALA	IMS	INDY	DET	ROA	MOH	TOR	IOW		IMS	NSH	GAT	POR	LAG			
2022	Dallara DW12	Chevrolet IndyCar V6t	(United Kingdom) Callum Ilott R	77	19	16^{L}	24	25	8	32		11	23	14	12	11	14	15	21	9^{L}	26^{L}		20th	219
2022	Dallara DW12	Chevrolet IndyCar V6t	(United States) Santino Ferrucci	77							21												28th	71
2023					STP	TXS	LBH	ALA	IMS	INDY	DET	ROA	MOH	TOR	IOW		NSH	IMS	GAT	POR	LAG			
2023	Dallara DW12	Chevrolet IndyCar V6t	(United Kingdom) Callum Ilott	77	5	9	19	13	18	12	27	18	16	18	15	14	12	17	27	15	5		16th	266
2023	Dallara DW12	Chevrolet IndyCar V6t	(Argentina) Agustín Canapino R	78	12	12	25	26	21	26	14	19	23	12	16	26	20	21	22	26	14		21st	180
2024					STP	THE^{1}	LBH	ALA	IMS	INDY	DET	ROA	LAG	MOH	IOW		TOR	GAT	POR	MIL		NSH		
2024	Dallara DW12	Chevrolet IndyCar V6t	(France) Romain Grosjean	77	22	DNQ	8	12	12	19	23	7	4	23	24	10	9	16	27	24	9	16	17th	260
2024	Dallara DW12	Chevrolet IndyCar V6t	(Argentina) Agustín Canapino	78	16	10	15	20	21	22	12		18	22	27	25	26						27th	109
2024	Dallara DW12	Chevrolet IndyCar V6t	(United States) Nolan Siegel R	78								23											23rd	154
2024	Dallara DW12	Chevrolet IndyCar V6t	(United States) Conor Daly	78														13	22	3	17	10	26th	119
2025					STP	THE	LBH	ALA	IMS	INDY	DET	GAT	ROA	MOH	IOW		TOR	LAG	POR	MIL	NSH			
2025	Dallara DW12	Chevrolet IndyCar V6t	(United States) Conor Daly	76	17	16	25	19	15	8	17	6	22	19	7	16	15	14	26	13	5		18th	268
2025	Dallara DW12	Chevrolet IndyCar V6t	(United States) Sting Ray Robb	77	21	23	9	22	21	23	15	20	26	18	22	23	17	19	14	23	16		25th	181
2026					STP	PHX	ARL	ALA	LBH	IMS	INDY	DET	GAT	ROA	MOH	NSH	POR	MAR	D.C.	MIL		LAG		
2026	Dallara DW12	Chevrolet IndyCar V6t	(Netherlands) Rinus VeeKay	76	9	22	14	14	13	15	6	12	4	18	4	12	4	7	23	3	7	16	10th	378
2026	Dallara DW12	Chevrolet IndyCar V6t	(United States) Sting Ray Robb	77	21	21	21	22	23	17	23	14	19	19	22	15	22	11	25	22	18	23	25th	182

* Season still in progress

1. In conjunction with AFS Racing.
2. Non-points paying exhibition event.

=== Indy NXT ===
(key)

Indy NXT results
Year	Chassis	Engine	Drivers	No.	1	2	3	4	5	6	7	8	9	10	11	12	13	14	15	16	17	18	19	20	Points		Position	
2012					STP	ALA	LBH	INDY	DET	MIL	IOW	TOR	EDM	TRO	BAL	FON									D.C.	T.C.	D.C.	T.C.
2012	Dallara	Nissan VRH	(Brazil) João Victor Horto (R)	86	13	7		7																	69	—	15th	—
2012	Dallara	Nissan VRH	(Venezuela) Bruno Palli (R)	86														7							26	—	24th	—
2012	Dallara	Nissan VRH	(United States) Chase Austin (R)	86							8														44	—	17th	—
2012	Dallara	Nissan VRH	(United States) Chase Austin (R)	87				10																	44	—	17th	—
2015					STP		LBH	ALA		IMS		INDY	TOR		MIL	IOW	MOH		LAG						D.C.	T.C.	D.C.	T.C.
2015	Dallara IL-15	Mazda-AER MZR-R 2.0 Turbo I4	(United States) Spencer Pigot (R)	12	3	3	2	1*	1*	7	12	9	1*	1*	7	8	8	3	1*	1*					357	344	1st	3rd
2015	Dallara IL-15	Mazda-AER MZR-R 2.0 Turbo I4	(United States) Kyle Kaiser (R)	18	5	5	12	8	12	12	6	5	3	9	9	4	4	11	2	10					237	344	6th	3rd
2016					STP		PHX	ALA		IMS		INDY	ROA		IOW	TOR		MOH		WGL	LAG				D.C.	T.C.	D.C.	T.C.
2016	Dallara IL-15	Mazda-AER MZR-R 2.0 Turbo I4	(Canada) Zachary Claman DeMelo (R)	13	11	16	11	5	7	13	14	13	5	4	8	13	13	7	7	9	12	7			199	275	9th	5th
2016	Dallara IL-15	Mazda-AER MZR-R 2.0 Turbo I4	(United States) Kyle Kaiser	18	3	2	1*	15	6	6	3	16	6	6	6	3	3	9	6	4	1*	3			334	275	3rd	5th
2017					STP		ALA		IMS		INDY	ROA		IOW	TOR		MOH		GAT	WGL					D.C.	T.C.	D.C.	T.C.
2017	Dallara IL-15	Mazda-AER MZR-R 2.0 Turbo I4	(United States) Kyle Kaiser	18	6	4	2	2	3	1*	9	3	2	5	1*	1	12	12	4	7					330	282	1st	4th
2017	Dallara IL-15	Mazda-AER MZR-R 2.0 Turbo I4	(Argentina) Nicolas Dapero (R)	31	9	8	9	6	11	8	12	14	12	12	7	7	14	8	5	8					187	282	13th	4th
2018					STP		ALA		IMS		INDY	ROA		IOW	TOR		MOH		GAT	POR					D.C.	T.C.	D.C.	T.C.
2018	Dallara IL-15	Mazda-AER MZR-R 2.0 Turbo I4	(Mexico) Alfonso Celis Jr. (R)	7			7	8																	27	291	11th	3rd
2018	Dallara IL-15	Mazda-AER MZR-R 2.0 Turbo I4	(South Korea) Heamin Choi	7																8	6				28	291	10th	3rd
2018	Dallara IL-15	Mazda-AER MZR-R 2.0 Turbo I4	(Brazil) Victor Franzoni (R)	23	4	4	4	2	6	3	8	3	1*	6	6	7	4	6	6	3	5				341	291	5th	3rd
2019					STP		COTA		IMS		INDY	ROA		TOR		MOH		GMP	POR		LAG				D.C.	T.C.	D.C.	T.C.
2019	Dallara IL-15	Mazda-AER MZR-R 2.0 Turbo I4	(Netherlands) Rinus VeeKay (R)	21	5	1*	2	4	3	1*	3	7	1*	3	9	3	3	2*	1*	2	1*	1*			465	432	2nd	2nd
2019	Dallara IL-15	Mazda-AER MZR-R 2.0 Turbo I4	(Canada) Dalton Kellett	67	10	8	9	9	8	7	5	8	7	8	3	7	8	6	5	6	6	6			275	432	7th	2nd
2021					ALA		STP		IMS		DET		ROA		MOH1		GAT		POR		LAG		MOH2		D.C.	T.C.	D.C.	T.C.
2021	Dallara IL-15	AER MZR-R 2.0 Turbo I4	(United States) Sting Ray Robb (R)	2	8	8	6	13	9	10	10	10	8	9	11	10	12	11	9	11	6	9	5	7	249	324	8th	3rd
2021	Dallara IL-15	AER MZR-R 2.0 Turbo I4	(United Kingdom) Toby Sowery	51	4	4	13	9	3	2	3	4	5	13	6	6	11	8							236	324	9th	3rd
2021	Dallara IL-15	AER MZR-R 2.0 Turbo I4	(Sweden) Rasmus Lindh (R)	51															7	9	5	7	10	8	81	324	14th	3rd
2023					STP	ALA	IMS1	DET		ROA	MOH	IOW	NSH	IMS2	GAT	POR	LAG								D.C.	T.C.	D.C.	T.C.
2023	Dallara IL-15	AER MZR-R 2.0 Turbo I4	(Italy) Matteo Nannini (R)	75	15	15	1^{L}*	14	11	16	17														146	144	19th	4th
2023	Dallara IL-15	AER MZR-R 2.0 Turbo I4	(Brazil) Victor Franzoni	75									14	19		11	6	13							91	144	21st	4th
2023	Dallara IL-15	AER MZR-R 2.0 Turbo I4	(Australia) Matthew Brabham	75								4													159	144	16th	4th
2023	Dallara IL-15	AER MZR-R 2.0 Turbo I4	(Australia) Matthew Brabham	76											7	9	5	4							159	144	16th	4th
2023	Dallara IL-15	AER MZR-R 2.0 Turbo I4	(United States) Reece Gold (R)	76	8	17																			334	144	8th	4th
2023	Dallara IL-15	AER MZR-R 2.0 Turbo I4	(Sweden) Rasmus Lindh	76			8	12	14	18	7	3	7	15	14										210	144	14th	4th
2024					STP	ALA	IMS		DET	ROA	LAG		MOH	IOW	GAT	POR	MIL	NSH							D.C.	T.C.	D.C.	T.C.
2024	Dallara IL-15	AER MZR-R 2.0 Turbo I4	(Mexico) Ricardo Escotto (R)	75					21		18	13													59	40	23rd	7th
2024	Dallara IL-15	AER MZR-R 2.0 Turbo I4	(Mexico) Ricardo Escotto (R)	76												17	13								59	40	23rd	7th
2024	Dallara IL-15	AER MZR-R 2.0 Turbo I4	(United States) Lindsay Brewer (R)	76	15	19	17	20	19	16	17	15													102	40	21st	7th
2026					STP	ARL	ALA		IMS		DET	GAT	ROA		MOH		NSH	POR	MIL	LAG					D.C.	T.C.	D.C.	T.C.
2026	Dallara IL-15	AER MZR-R 2.0 Turbo I4	(United States) Alexander Koreiba (R)	75	20	16																			24*		18th*	
2026	Dallara IL-15	AER MZR-R 2.0 Turbo I4	(Mexico) Ricardo Escotto	76	13	12																			35*		12th*	

=== Star Mazda/Pro Mazda/Indy Pro 2000 Championship ===
(key)

Indy Pro 2000 Championship results
Year	Chassis	Engine	Drivers	No.	1	2	3	4	5	6	7	8	9	10	11	12	13	14	15	16	17	18	Points		Position	
2009					SEB	VIR	UTA	NJMP		MIL	IOW	ACC		TRO	MOS	ATL	LAG						D.C.	T.C.	D.C.	T.C.
2009	Star Race Cars	Mazda Renesis	(Republic of Ireland) Peter Dempsey	3						4	1	1	1	13	4	1	20						461	—	2nd	—
2009	Star Race Cars	Mazda Renesis	(Canada) Michael Furfari (R)	13	12	25	9	7	11	10	8	8	6	8	13	13	9						329	—	9th	—
2009	Star Race Cars	Mazda Renesis	(United States) Walt Bowlin^{1}	23	25	20	25	22	23					15	17	17							124	—	25th	—
2009	Star Race Cars	Mazda Renesis	(United States) Walt Bowlin^{1}	23	25	20	25	22	23					15	17	17							(112)^{1}	—	(3rd)^{1}	—
2009	Star Race Cars	Mazda Renesis	(United States) Sean Burstyn (R)	61	20	23	14	20	19		13	5	18	9									184	—	19th	—
2009	Star Race Cars	Mazda Renesis	(Japan) Toshi Deki^{2} (R)	80											15	15	14						237	—	14th	—
2009	Star Race Cars	Mazda Renesis	(Japan) Toshi Deki^{2} (R)	80											15	15	14						(172)^{2}	—	(2nd)^{2}	—
2010					SEB	STP	LAG	IRP	IOW	NJMP		ACC		TRO	ROA	MOS	ATL						D.C.	T.C.	D.C.	T.C.
2010	Star Race Cars	Mazda Renesis	(United States) Conor Daly	22	3	1	1	1	1	3	4	3	1	3	1	1	3						539	324	1st	2nd
2010	Star Race Cars	Mazda Renesis	(Colombia) Tatiana Calderón (R)	25	20	19	9	11	12	11	9	7	11	9	8	16	11						320	324	10th	2nd
2010	Star Race Cars	Mazda Renesis	(Chile) Martin Scuncio (R)	60													4						—	324	NC	2nd
2010	Star Race Cars	Mazda Renesis	(United States) Sean Burstyn	61									15										—	324	NC	2nd
2010	Star Race Cars	Mazda Renesis	(United States) Rusty Mitchell	66					10	20	10	13	6	8	5	9	12						350	324	9th	2nd
2010	Star Race Cars	Mazda Renesis	(United States) Hayden Duerson	94	18	20																	34	324	26th	2nd
2011					STP	ALA	IRP	MIL	IOW	MOS	TRO		SNM	BAL	LAG								D.C.	T.C.	D.C.	T.C.
2011	Star Race Cars	Mazda Renesis	(Brazil) João Victor Horto	7	14	4	5	7	2	1	2	4	6	3	6								375	274	4th	2nd
2011	Star Race Cars	Mazda Renesis	(Colombia) Tatiana Calderón	10	18	3	9	9	5	3	12	8	5	8	7								322	274	6th	2nd
2011	Star Race Cars	Mazda Renesis	(United States) Gustavo Menezes (R)	28	8	7	7	5	3	6	6	6	9	4	15								297	274	8th	2nd
2011	Star Race Cars	Mazda Renesis	(United States) Richard Heistand (R)	39	9	16																	47	274	19th	2nd
2011	Star Race Cars	Mazda Renesis	(Chile) Martin Scuncio	60	2	11	6	2	12	9													187	274	13th	2nd
2012					STP		ALA		IRP	IOW	TOR		EDM		TRO		BAL		LAG		ATL		D.C.	T.C.	D.C.	T.C.
2012	Star Race Cars	Mazda Renesis	(United States) Connor De Phillippi	2	1	5	5	3	1	3	7	16	6	13	3	13	2	3	3	3	3		325	416	4th	2nd
2012	Star Race Cars	Mazda Renesis	(Venezuela) Bruno Palli (R)	15	14	15	13	20	14	7	10	15	18	12	10	17	10	7	20	10	5		146	416	12th	2nd
2012	Star Race Cars	Mazda Renesis	(Chile) Martin Scuncio	22	6	6	4	1	4	2	17	7	4	15	6	5	18	17	9	11			232	416	8th	2nd
2012	Star Race Cars	Mazda Renesis	(Venezuela) Diego Ferreira (R)	57	7	9	9	7	10	8	5	5	10	11	16	15	5	5	4	4	4		235	416	6th	2nd
2013					COTA		STP		IRP	MIL	TOR		MOS		MOH		TRO		HOU				D.C.	T.C.	D.C.	T.C.
2013	Star Race Cars	Mazda Renesis	(Mexico) José Gutierrez (R)	2	10	10									10	10							—	377	NC	2nd
2013	Star Race Cars	Mazda Renesis	(Argentina) Julia Ballario (R)	3											9	11	9	7					—	377	NC	2nd
2013	Star Race Cars	Mazda Renesis	(United States) Scott Anderson	44	6	4	8	7	5	5	10	9	4	2	16	6	4	4	6	7			245	377	5th	2nd
2013	Star Race Cars	Mazda Renesis	(Venezuela) Diego Ferreira	57	1*	2	3	2	6	6	2	2	6	3	3	2	2	2	5	4			357	377	2nd	2nd
2014					STP		ALA		IMS		IRP	HOU		MOH		MIL	SNM						D.C.	T.C.	D.C.	T.C.
2014	Star Race Cars	Mazda Renesis	(Mexico) José Gutierrez	5	20	9	9	9	7	3	9	7	8	5	4	9	11	1					201	375	7th	1st
2014	Star Race Cars	Mazda Renesis	(Argentina) Julia Ballario	6	11	7	20	14	10	7	12	4	10	15	11	6	10	8					152	375	11th	1st
2014	Star Race Cars	Mazda Renesis	(United States) Spencer Pigot	7	1*	1*	1*	1*	8	8	3	9*	1*	4	6	1*	21	5					309	375	1st	1st
2014	Star Race Cars	Mazda Renesis	(United States) Kyle Kaiser (R)	18	2	2	3	5	13	5	8	8	15	12	7	10	1	DSQ					211	375	6th	1st
2015					STP		NOLA		ALA		IMS			IRP	TOR		IOW	MOH		LAG			D.C.	T.C.	D.C.	T.C.
2015	Star Race Cars	Mazda Renesis	(Canada) Garett Grist	5	11	6	11	C	7	3	5	6	8	4	5	1*	11	4	9	1*	1*		294	426	3rd	1st
2015	Star Race Cars	Mazda Renesis	(France) Timothé Buret (R)	6	17	13	3	C	2	8	2	1*	3	12	3	7	9	3	2	11	7		281	426	5th	1st
2015	Star Race Cars	Mazda Renesis	(Mexico) José Gutierrez	7	5	2	8	C	16	16	12	7	4	5	16	5	6	12	10	4	8		216	426	9th	1st
2015	Star Race Cars	Mazda Renesis	(United States) Will Owen (R)	23	8	8	13	C	9	4	8	8	2	2	15	8	10	8	5	3	4		243	426	7th	1st
2016					STP		ALA		IMS		IRP	ROA		TOR		MOH		LAG					D.C.	T.C.	D.C.	T.C.
2016	Star Race Cars	Mazda Renesis	(Australia) Jake Parsons (R)	00	8	5	10	9	3	6	4	6	9	3	5	4	7	5	12	5			258	445	6th	2nd
2016	Star Race Cars	Mazda Renesis	(Canada) Garett Grist	5	6	8	3	3	4	5	2												133	445	8th	2nd
2016	Star Race Cars	Mazda Renesis	(United States) Will Owen	23	9	6	5	4	2	3	6	3	3	4	4	3	2	11	2	2			317	445	4th	2nd
2016	Star Race Cars	Mazda Renesis	(Argentina) Nicolas Dapero (R)	31	10	10	7	7	8	8	3	2	5	5	9	5	8	3	1*	3			278	445	5th	2nd
2017					STP		IMS		ROA		MOH			GAT	WGL								D.C.	T.C.	D.C.	T.C.
2017	Star Race Cars	Mazda Renesis	(Brazil) Victor Franzoni	23	2	2	1*	1*	1*	2	2	1	2	1*	1*	1*							351	372	1st	2nd
2017	Star Race Cars	Mazda Renesis	(United States) Jeff Green (R)	60	13	9	10	13	6	5	13	13	10	5	11	10							151	372	8th	2nd
2018					STP		ALA		IMS		IRP	ROA		TOR		MOH		GAT	POR				D.C.	T.C.	D.C.	T.C.
2018	Tatuus PM-18	Mazda MZR-R PM18At	(Brazil) Carlos Cunha	1	4	3	10	3	4	2*	2	6	6	2	10	4	12						252	477	6th	1st
2018	Tatuus PM-18	Mazda MZR-R PM18At	(Netherlands) Rinus VeeKay (R)	2	1	1*	5	4	3	14	4	5	5	1*	1*	1*	1*	1*	2	2			412	477	1st	1st
2018	Tatuus PM-18	Mazda MZR-R PM18At	(United States) Robert Megennis	9	3	16	14	6	14	8	3	8	10	12	3	3	2	2	5	7			269	477	5th	1st
2019					STP		IMS		LOR	ROA		TOR		MOH		GMP	POR		LAG				D.C.	T.C.	D.C.	T.C.
2019	Tatuus PM-18	Mazda MZR-R PM18At	(United States) Sting Ray Robb	2	3	5	4	2	2	7	10	11	5	5	2	5	8	2	2	6			323	442	4th	1st
2019	Tatuus PM-18	Mazda MZR-R PM18At	(Sweden) Rasmus Lindh (R)	10	2	4	1	1	3	4	2	2	3	2	3	2	5	3	3	1			417	442	2nd	1st
2020					ROA		MOH			LOR	WWTR	IMS			MOH		NJMP			STP			D.C.	T.C.	D.C.	T.C.
2020	Tatuus PM-18	Mazda MZR-R PM18At	(United States) Sting Ray Robb	2	5	2	10	3	1	6	4	1	1	1	4	1	2	1	3	1	5		437	451	1st	1st
2020	Tatuus PM-18	Mazda MZR-R PM18At	(Russia) Artem Petrov (R)	42	13	1	5	1*	8	9	3	10	3	3	5	4	5	3	11	3	9		326	451	4th	1st
2020	Tatuus PM-18	Mazda MZR-R PM18At	(United States) Nate Aranda (R)	69	9	9	12	10	13	DNS		9	9	12									109	451	13th	1st
2021					ALA		STP		IMS			IRP	ROA		MOH1		GMP	NJMP			MOH2		D.C.	T.C.	D.C.	T.C.
2021	Tatuus PM-18	Mazda MZR-R PM18At	(Barbados) Kyffin Simpson (R)	21	11	17	10	14	4	3	6	8	11	3	7	3	11	10	8	7			231	384	8th	2nd
2021	Tatuus PM-18	Mazda MZR-R PM18At	(Mexico) Manuel Sulaimán	22	DSQ	8	5	2	9	11	8	3	1*	7	12	7	7	Wth	Wth	Wth			214	384	10th	2nd
2021	Tatuus PM-18	Mazda MZR-R PM18At	(Pakistan) Enaam Ahmed (R)	22																	8	2	138	384	12th	2nd
2021	Tatuus PM-18	Mazda MZR-R PM18At	(United States) Reece Gold (R)	55	3	13	6	3	3	4	2	2*	5	2	6	4	8	1*	4	10	4	11	366	384	5th	2nd
2022					STP		ALA		IMS			IRP	ROA		MOH		TOR		GMP	POR			D.C.	T.C.	D.C.	T.C.
2022	Tatuus IP-22	Mazda MZR-R PM18At	(Pakistan) Enaam Ahmed	47	2	13	3	4	5	15	5	4	3	4	6	4	2	7	7	3	4	4	338	419	3rd	1st
2022	Tatuus IP-22	Mazda MZR-R PM18At	(United States) Reece Gold	55	7	10	1*	5	4	1*	15	2*	6	5	7	6	4	2	6	2	1*	1*	390	419	2nd	1st

1. Masters Series.
2. Expert Series.
