= Kyffin Simpson =

Caymanian racing driver (born 2004)

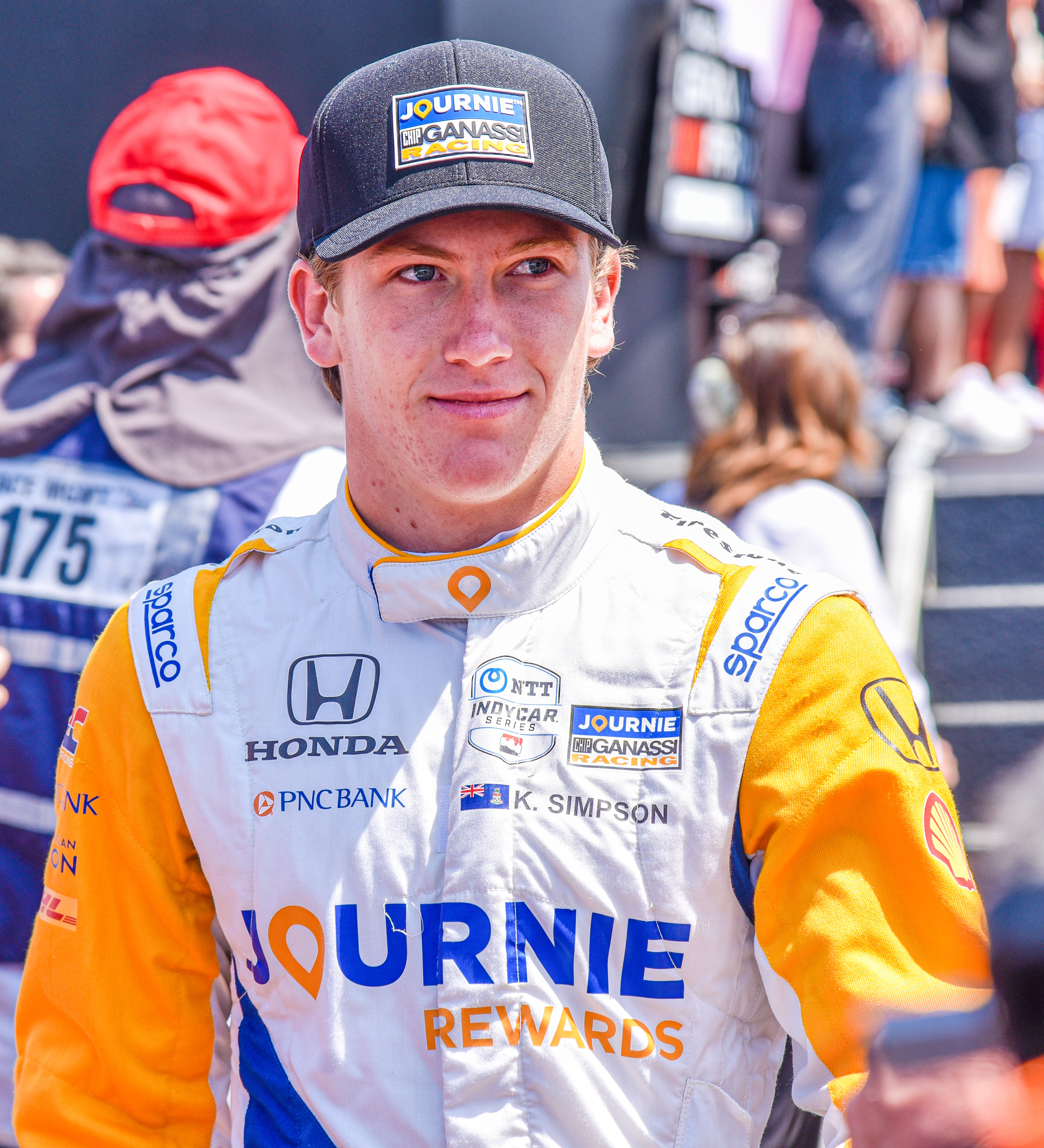
- Simpson in 2024
- Nationality: (Cayman Islands) Caymanian
- Born: 9 October 2004 (age 22); Bridgetown, Barbados

IndyCar Series career
- 43 races run over 3 years
- Team: No. 8 (Chip Ganassi Racing)
- Best finish: 13th (2026)
- First race: 2024 Grand Prix of St. Petersburg (St. Petersburg)
- Last race: 2026 Mission Grand Prix of Monterey (Laguna Seca)
Wins	Podiums	Poles
0	1	0

European Le Mans Series - LMP2 career
- Debut season: 2023
- Current team: Algarve Pro Racing
- Categorisation: FIA Silver (2022–2023); FIA Gold (2024–)
- Car number: 25
- Starts: 6
- Championships: 1 (2023)
- Wins: 2
- Podiums: 5
- Poles: 2
- Fastest laps: 2
- Best finish: 1st in 2023

Previous series
- 2022–23 2021 2020–21 2020: Indy NXT; Indy Pro 2000 Championship; FR Americas Championship; F4 United States Championship

Championship titles
- 2021: FR Americas Championship

24 Hours of Le Mans career
- Years: 2024
- Teams: Nielsen Racing
- Best finish: 25th (2024)
- Class wins: 0

Kyffin Simpson (/ˈkɪ.fən/ KIH-fən; born 9 October 2004) is a Caymanian racing driver competing in the IndyCar Series with Chip Ganassi Racing. He won the 2023 European Le Mans Series championship with Algarve Pro Racing.

== Early life ==
Simpson was born in Bridgetown, Barbados; the son of Caymanian businessman David Simpson. Simpson competes as Caymanian, saying, "I really feel connected with the people of Cayman. It’s cool to fly the flag on the side of my car."

== Junior career ==
=== Formula 4 United States Championship ===
Simpson made his car racing debut in 2020 for Velocity Racing Development in the 2020 Formula 4 United States Championship after nine years of karting across the Caribbean and United States.

=== Formula Regional Americas Championship ===
Simpson combined a season in the Formula 4 United States Championship with a season in the Formula Regional Americas Championship in 2020, and won the championship in dominant fashion, finishing on the podium in all but five races.

Winning the FR Americas title awarded Simpson with a Honda Performance Development scholarship worth $600,000 for a Super Formula campaign in 2022, but Japan’s ongoing travel restrictions due to the COVID-19 pandemic prevented these plans from coming to fruition.

=== Indy Pro 2000 Championship ===
Parallel to his Regional F3 campaign, Simpson also entered the Road to Indy ladder with IndyCar team Juncos Racing, competing in sixteen of the eighteen-race Indy Pro 2000 Championship season, scoring three podiums.

=== Indy Lights / Indy NXT ===
In 2022, Simpson signed a multi-year deal as a development driver with Chip Ganassi Racing, whilst also progressing to Indy Lights, partnering James Roe Jr. at TJ Speed Motorsports. Following eight races with the team, Simpson moved to HMD Motorsports. He finished ninth in the Indy Lights standings with a best result of fifth in Barber and Detroit.

Simpson confirmed a return to the newly rebranded Indy NXT series in 2023 with HMD Motorsports. He scored two podiums and ended up tenth overall.

== SportsCar racing career ==
=== IMSA SportsCar Championship ===
==== 2022 ====
Alongside his Indy Lights duties, Simpson made his IMSA SportsCar Championship debut with Gradient Racing at the wheel of an Acura NSX GT3 EVO II at the 2022 24 Hours of Daytona. He, along with his teammates Mario Farnbacher and Till Bechtolsheimer, won the 2022 Petit Le Mans in the GTD class.

==== 2023 ====
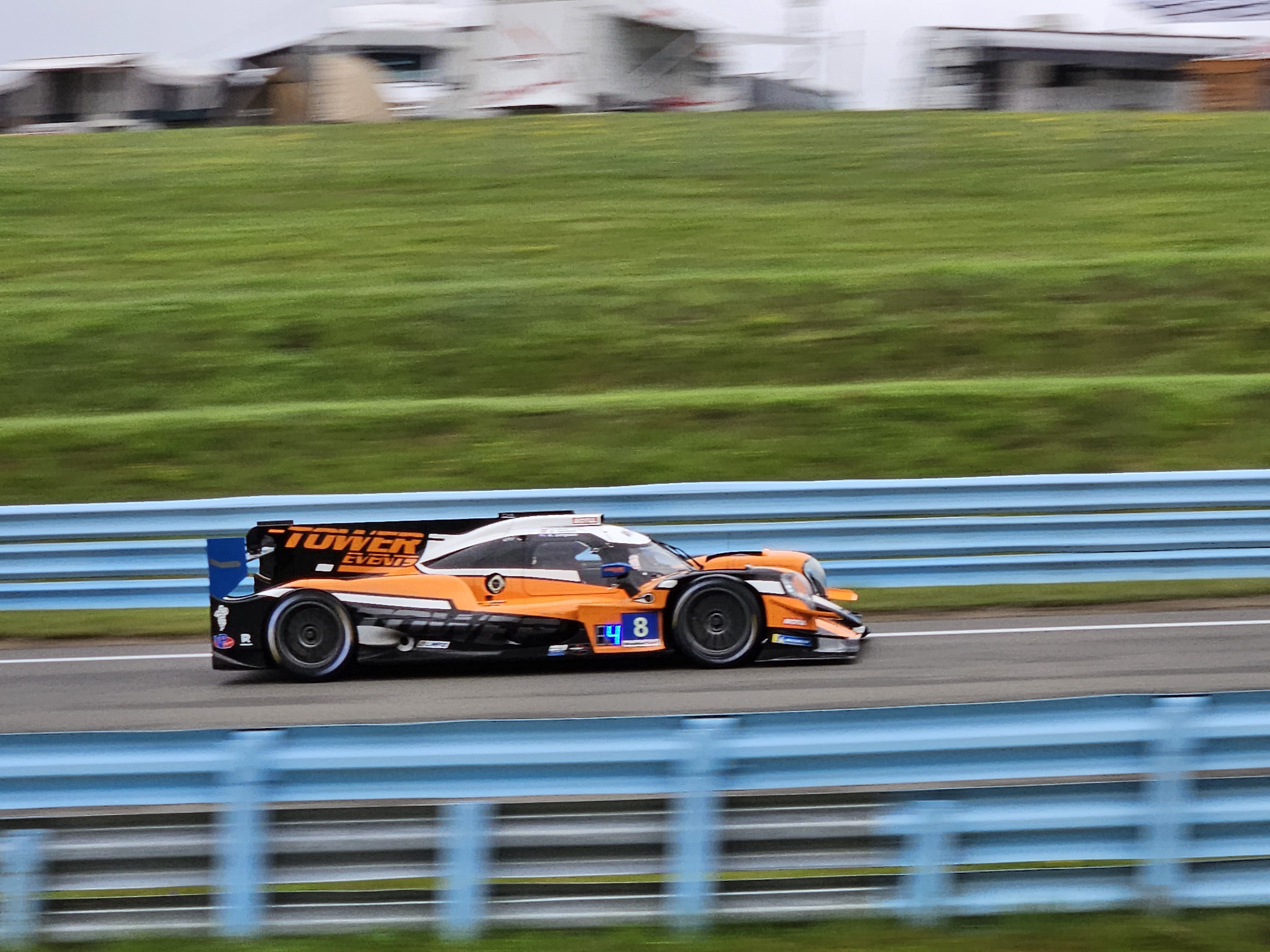
Simpson at Watkins Glen in 2023

Simpson joined Tower Motorsports for a part-time role in the 2023 IMSA SportsCar Championship competing in LMP2. After finishing fifth at the 24 Hours of Daytona, Simpson, along with teammates Scott McLaughlin and John Farano, won the LMP2 class of the 12 Hours of Sebring, marking the Barbadian's second triumph in IMSA.

=== Asian Le Mans Series ===
==== 2023 ====
Alongside his duties in junior formulae, Simpson would compete full-time in the 2023 Asian Le Mans Series together with James Allen and John Falb as part of Algarve Pro Racing in preparation for a campaign in that year's European Le Mans Series. The season opener in Dubai yielded a perfect start, as the trio took victory despite a spin from Falb. Simpson played a major role in said victory, taking second place from Indy NXT rival Christian Bogle near half-distance, before closing the gap between himself and leader Ayhancan Güven from 25 to mere seven seconds by the end of their stints. The following day, a puncture prevented the No. 25 from battling for a win; they eventually settled for fourth. Race one at the Yas Marina Circuit saw Simpson battling the experienced Oliver Jarvis for a podium spot, however he would take himself out of contention owing to a spin into the turn sixteen wall mere minutes before the end. On Sunday, fourth place meant that Simpson, Allen and Falb would end up third in the LMP2 classification.

=== European Le Mans Series ===
==== 2023 ====
Simpson would stay with Algarve Pro Racing to compete in the 2023 European Le Mans Series, where Simpson once again partnered James Allen, the pair being joined by Cadillac Hypercar driver Alex Lynn. An unspectacular maiden race in Barcelona was followed by a markedly improved showing at the Circuit Paul Ricard, where Simpson's ability to stay close to leader Vladislav Lomko throughout the opening stints - exemplified by the Bajan setting the race's fastest lap - enabled teammates Lynn and Allen to get embroiled in the battle for victory, with the latter executing a late-race pass on Louis Delétraz to bring first place to APR. Prior to the third race, held at Aragón, Simpson received praise from Lynn, the Brit stating that "Kyffin is a fast learner" and praising him for his pace, whilst remarking that Simpson needed more experience. The team finished the race in third. In a chaotic Spa event a month later, Simpson and his APR teammates drove an error-free race to claim victory, putting them into the championship lead. Thanks to a pair of second places at the 4 Hours of Algarve and Portimão, the APR crew won the ELMS title. Simpson struggled for pace in wet conditions during the latter, but held the car on track whilst others did not.

== IndyCar ==
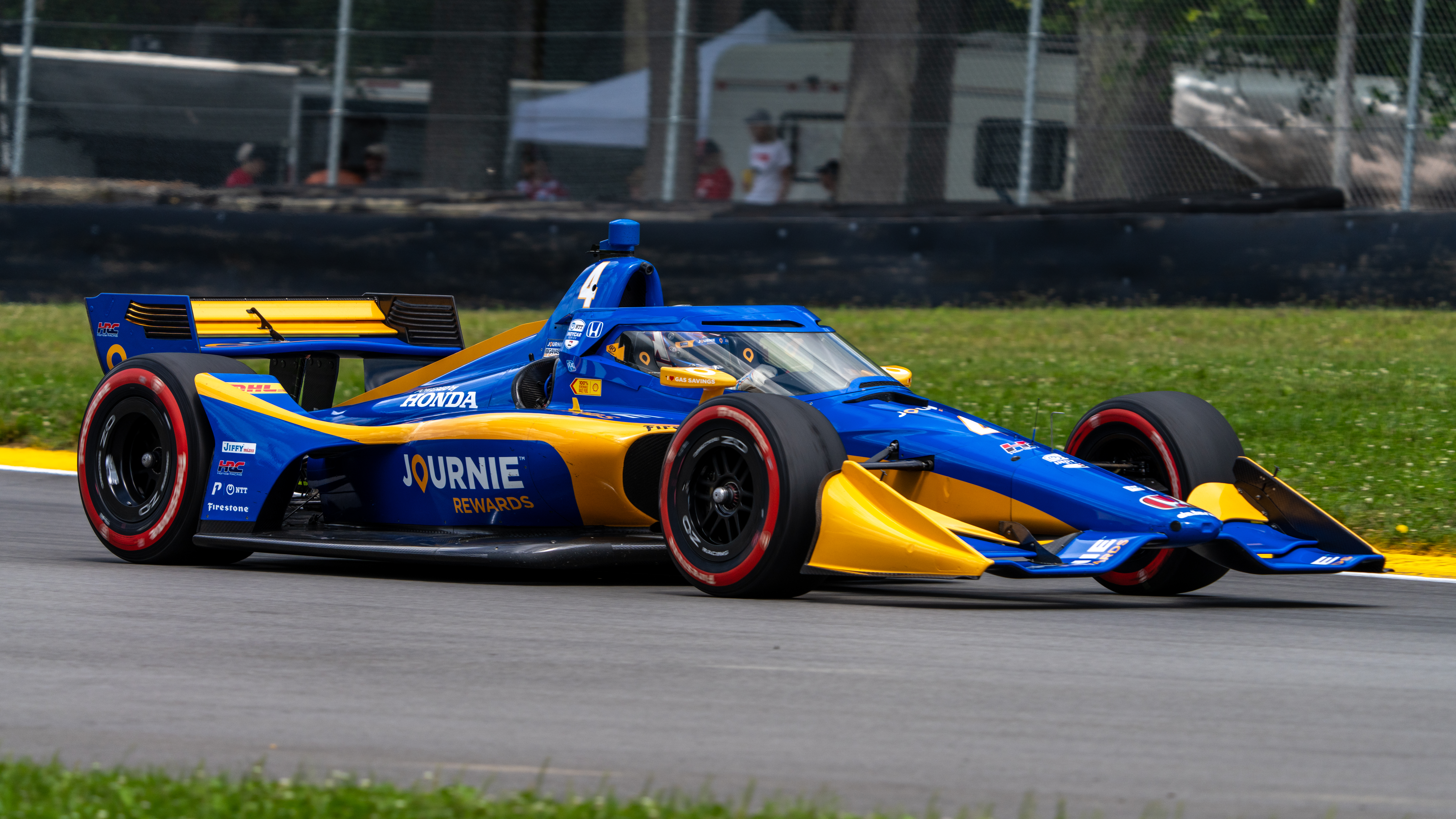
Simpson in 2024 driving the No.4 IndyCar

Simpson is the first driver from the Cayman Islands, and the Caribbean as a whole, to compete in the NTT IndyCar Series. Simpson's racing program is funded by his family, and his agreement operates without a performance clause.

=== Chip Ganassi Racing ===
==== 2023–24 ====
In January 2023, Simpson completed his first NTT IndyCar Series test with Chip Ganassi Racing at Sebring International Raceway. Following the end of the 2023 IndyCar season, Chip Ganassi announced that Simpson, who had been the team's development driver over the past two years, would be stepping up to IndyCar in 2024. He started his season at St. Petersburg with a twelfth place finish, ending up ahead of all other rookies and setting the fastest lap of the race. Following three further top-twenty finishes, Simpson ended up 21st in his first appearance at the Indy 500, having qualified a then-record eighteenth. He soon experienced two retirements, being spun into the barriers by Christian Rasmussen at Road America early on and getting spun by Agustín Canapino in Monterey. Two top-twenty results at Iowa were followed by a retirement in Toronto, where Simpson crashed at turn eight with seventeen laps to go. Another mistake came at Gateway: Simpson spun into the wall on lap 86, having struggled for pace during the weekend. After sixteenth at Portland, Simpson took thirteenth in the second Milwaukee race and finished 22nd at Nashville. Though Simpson finished 21st in the drivers' standings — behind all four of his teammates, and with the second-worst grid position average of all full-time drivers - though he was retained by Ganassi for the 2025 season, moving to the No. 8.

==== 2025 ====
Simpson started the season with eighteenth place at St. Petersburg and fifteenth at Thermal Club. He then claimed his maiden top-ten result in IndyCar, finishing tenth at Long Beach after using the alternate strategy. Having qualified tenth at Barber, Simpson finished one lap down in 21st; this preceded another tenth place in qualifying for the Indy Road Course race, one which Simpson could not start after suffering mechanical trouble on his way to the grid. He qualified thirteenth for the Indy 500 but got taken out mid-race after being clipped by a spinning Kyle Larson. During the next weekend in Detroit Simpson posted the fastest lap alongside a fifth place, one achieved after going on the alternate strategy. A fifteenth place finish at Gateway preceded a sixth place at Road America. After qualifying third at Mid-Ohio, the Caymanian disappointingly crossed the line tenth after stalling in pit lane and then receiving a penalty after running over the foot of a crew member for Rinus Veekay's pit crew. The Iowa double header saw him finish eighteenth and thirteenth respectively. Simpson charged through the field with a well-executed two stop strategy in Toronto, qualifying fourteenth and starting thirteenth, making up ten places to finish third for his best ever result and first podium in the IndyCar series.

Simpson retired from the Grand Prix of Monterey on the opening lap, having caused a collision with Felix Rosenqvist at turn 6. He received a six-place grid penalty for the following event at Portland. After qualifying twelfth, Simpson dropped to 21st in the race. An unspectacular Milwaukee race yielded a finishing spot of 20th. Meanwhile, the final race of the season at Nashville brought around Simpson's best oval performance to date: having qualified tenth, Simpson found himself battling Scott McLaughlin for a podium place in the final laps, eventually ending up fourth after being re-overtaken on the last lap. Simpson's racecraft was later praised by McLaughlin, who complimented his ability to battle cleanly and called him someone who "respected the outside lane". Thanks to his six top ten finishes, Simpson improved to 17th in the standings.

== Personal life ==
Simpson was born in Bridgetown, Barbados, but grew up in the Cayman Islands, where he began his racing career. He has a younger sister.

Outside of motorsport, Simpson enjoys aquatic sports including kite surfing, surf-riding, and swimming.

== Racing record ==
=== Career summary ===
Season	Series	Team	Races	Wins	Poles	F/Laps	Podiums	Points	Position
2020	Formula 4 United States Championship	Velocity Racing Development	9	0	0	0	0	14	18th
2020	Formula Regional Americas Championship	HMD Motorsports	9	0	0	0	0	30	13th
2021	Formula Regional Americas Championship	TJ Speed Motorsports	18	7	2	9	13	314	**1st**
2021	Indy Pro 2000 Championship	Juncos Hollinger Racing	16	0	0	1	3	231	8th
2022	Indy Lights	TJ Speed Motorsports	8	0	0	0	0	312	9th
2022	Indy Lights	HMD Motorsports	6	0	0	0	0	312	9th
2022	IMSA SportsCar Championship - GTD	Gradient Racing	4	1	0	0	1	1003	26th
2023	Indy NXT	HMD Motorsports	13	0	1	0	2	283	10th
2023	IMSA SportsCar Championship - LMP2	Tower Motorsports	4	1	0	0	1	899	13th
2023	Asian Le Mans Series - LMP2	Algarve Pro Racing	4	1	0	0	1	51	**3rd**
2023	European Le Mans Series - LMP2	Algarve Pro Racing	6	2	2	2	5	113	**1st**
2024	IndyCar Series	Chip Ganassi Racing	17	0	0	1	0	182	21st
2024	IMSA SportsCar Championship - LMP2	DragonSpeed	1	0	0	0	0	262	48th
2024	24 Hours of Le Mans - LMP2	Nielsen Racing	1	0	0	0	0	N/A	11th
2025	IndyCar Series	Chip Ganassi Racing	17	0	0	2	1	282	17th
2026	IndyCar Series	Chip Ganassi Racing	18	0	0	0	0	327	13th
2026	IMSA SportsCar Championship - LMP2	Tower Motorsports	1	0	0	0	0	250	39th

=== Complete Formula 4 United States Championship results ===
(key) (Races in bold indicate pole position) (Races in italics indicate fastest lap)

Year	Team	1	2	3	4	5	6	7	8	9	10	11	12	13	14	15	16	17	18	Rank	Points
2020	Velocity Racing Development	MOH; 1; 9	MOH; 2; 13	VIR; 1 Ret	VIR; 2; 19	VIR; 3; 7	BAR; 1; 13	BAR; 2 Ret	BAR; 3; 16	BAR; 4; 6	SEB; 1	SEB; 2	SEB; 3	HMS; 1	HMS; 2	HMS; 3	COA; 1	COA; 2	COA; 3	18th	14

=== Complete Formula Regional Americas Championship results ===
(key) (Races in bold indicate pole position) (Races in italics indicate fastest lap)

Year	Team	1	2	3	4	5	6	7	8	9	10	11	12	13	14	15	16	17	18	Rank	Points
2020	HMD Motorsports	MOH; 1	MOH; 2	VIR; 1	VIR; 2	VIR; 3	BAR; 1	BAR; 2	BAR; 3	SEB; 1; 7	SEB; 2 Ret	SEB; 3; 9	HMS; 1; 8	HMS; 2; 7	HMS; 3; 7	COA; 1; 10	COA; 2; 10	COA; 3; 10		13th	30
2021	TJ Speed Motorsports	**ATL**; **1**; 1	ATL; 2; 1	ATL; 3; 1	ROA; 1; 4	ROA; 2; 1	ROA; 3; 1	MOH; 1; 12	MOH; 2; 3	MOH; 3; 2	BRA; 1; 2	BRA; 2; 2	BRA; 3; 2	VIR; 1; 4	VIR; 2; 5	VIR; 3; 2	**COA**; **1**; 11	COA; 2; 1	COA; 3; 1	1st	314

=== American open-wheel results ===
==== Indy Pro 2000 ====
(key) (Races in bold indicate pole position) (Races in italics indicate fastest lap) (Races with * indicate most race laps led)

Year	Team	1	2	3	4	5	6	7	8	9	10	11	12	13	14	15	16	17	18	Rank	Points
2021	Juncos Hollinger Racing	ALA; 11	ALA; 17	STP; 10	STP; 14	IMS; 4	IMS; 3	IMS; 6	IRP; 8	ROA; 11	ROA; 3	MOH1; 7	MOH1; 3	GMP; 11	NJMP; 10	NJMP; 8	NJMP; 7	MOH2	MOH2	8th	231

==== Indy Lights / Indy NXT ====
(key) (Races in bold indicate pole position) (Races in italics indicate fastest lap) (Races with * indicate most race laps led)

Year	Team	1	2	3	4	5	6	7	8	9	10	11	12	13	14	Rank	Points
2022	TJ Speed Motorsports	STP; 11	BAR; 5	IMS; 12	IMS; 8	DET; 5	DET; 7	RDA; 9	MOH; 10							9th	312
2022	HMD Motorsports									IOW; 11	NSH; 8	GMP; 10	POR; 9	LAG; 12	LAG; 12	9th	312
2023	HMD Motorsports	STP; 10	BAR; 18	IMS; 3	DET; 13	DET; 17	**RDA**; 8	MOH; 2	IOW; 16	NSH; 15	IMS; 5	GMP	POR; 13	LAG; 4	LAG; 17	10th	283

==== IndyCar Series ====
(key) (Races in bold indicate pole position; races in italics indicate fastest lap)

Year	Team	No.	Chassis	Engine	1	2	3	4	5	6	7	8	9	10	11	12	13	14	15	16	17	18	Rank	Points	Ref
2024	Chip Ganassi Racing	4	Dallara DW12	Honda	STP; 12	THE; DNQ	LBH; 19	ALA; 14	IMS; 15	INDY; 21	DET; 24	ROA; 27	LAG; 23	MOH; 21	IOW; 14	IOW; 18	TOR; 22	GTW; 25	POR; 16	MIL; 25	MIL; 13	NSH; 22	21st	182	
2025	Chip Ganassi Racing	8	Dallara DW12	Honda	STP; 18	THE; 15	LBH; 10	ALA; 21	IMS; 27	INDY; 25	DET; 5	GTW; 15	ROA; 6	MOH; 10	IOW; 18	IOW; 13	TOR; 3	LAG; 27	POR; 21	MIL; 20	NSH; 4		17th	282	
2026	Chip Ganassi Racing	8	Dallara DW12	Honda	STP; 15	PHX; 10	ARL; 20	ALA; 20	LBH; 10	IMS; 12	INDY; 14	DET; 9	GTW; 21	ROA; 4	MOH; 15	NSH; 9	POR; 10	MRK; 14	WSH; 5	MIL; 16	MIL; 19	LAG; 10	13th	327	

==== Indianapolis 500 ====
Year	Chassis	Engine	Start	Finish	Team
2024	Dallara	Honda	18	21	Chip Ganassi Racing
2025	Dallara	Honda	13	25	Chip Ganassi Racing
2026	Dallara	Honda	7	14	Chip Ganassi Racing

=== Complete IMSA SportsCar Championship results ===
(key) (Races in bold indicate pole position; results in italics indicate fastest lap)

Year	Team	Class	Make	Engine	1	2	3	4	5	6	7	8	9	10	11	12	Pos.	Points
2022	Gradient Racing	GTD	Acura NSX GT3 Evo22	Acura 3.5 L Turbo V6	DAY; 13	SEB; 11	LBH	LGA	MOH	DET	WGL; 9	MOS	LIM	ELK	VIR	PET; 1	26th	1003
2023	Tower Motorsports	LMP2	Oreca 07	Gibson GK428 4.2 L V8	DAY; 5	SEB; 1	LGA	WGL; 5	ELK	IMS	PET; 7						13th	899
2024	DragonSpeed USA	LMP2	Oreca 07	Gibson GK428 4.2 L V8	DAY; 7	SEB	WGL	MOS	ELK	IMS	PET						48th	262
2026	Tower Motorsports	LMP2	Oreca 07	Gibson GK428 4.2 L V8	DAY; 8	SEB	WGL	MOS	ELK	IMS	PET						39th	250

=== Complete Asian Le Mans Series results ===
(key) (Races in bold indicate pole position) (Races in italics indicate fastest lap)

Year	Team	Class	Car	Engine	1	2	3	4	Pos.	Points
2023	Algarve Pro Racing	LMP2	Oreca 07	Gibson GK428 4.2 L V8	DUB; 1; 1	DUB; 2; 4	ABU; 1; 9	ABU; 2; 4	3rd	51

=== Complete European Le Mans Series results ===
Year	Entrant	Class	Chassis	Engine	1	2	3	4	5	6	Rank	Points
2023	Algarve Pro Racing	LMP2	Oreca 07	Gibson GK428 4.2 L V8	CAT; 5	LEC; 1	ARA; 3	**SPA**; 1	**POR**; 2	ALG; 2	1st	113

=== Complete 24 Hours of Le Mans results ===
Year	Team	Co-Drivers	Car	Class	Laps	Pos.	Class Pos.
2024	(United Kingdom) Nielsen Racing	(Denmark) David Heinemeier Hansson (Switzerland) Fabio Scherer	Oreca 07-Gibson	LMP2	291	25th	11th

Sporting positions
Preceded by Linus Lundqvist	Formula Regional Americas Championship; Champion; 2021	Succeeded by Raoul Hyman
Preceded by Louis Delétraz; Ferdinand Habsburg	European Le Mans Series; LMP2 Champion; 2023; With: Alex Lynn & James Allen	Succeeded by Louis Delétraz; Robert Kubica; Jonny Edgar
