= 2026 Snap-on IndyCar Weekend =

IndyCar races held in West Allis, Wisconsin

(United States) 2026 Snap-on IndyCar Weekend
Race details
16th and 17th round of the 2026 IndyCar season
← Previous race	Next race →
- Layout of the Milwaukee Mile circuit
- Date: August 29–30, 2026
- Official name: Snap-on IndyCar Weekend
- Location: Milwaukee Mile
- Course: Permanent racing facility 1 mi / 1.6 km
- Distance: Both 250 laps 253.750 mi / 408.371 km
Race 1

Pole position
- Driver: (New Zealand) Scott McLaughlin (Team Penske)
- Time: 00:22.0738

Fastest lap
- Driver: (Mexico) Pato O'Ward (Arrow McLaren)
- Time: 00:22.9156 (on lap 2 of 250)

Podium
- First: (Mexico) Pato O'Ward (Arrow McLaren)
- Second: (United States) David Malukas (Team Penske)
- Third: (Netherlands) Rinus VeeKay (Juncos Hollinger Racing)
Race 2

Pole position
- Driver: (Spain) Álex Palou (Chip Ganassi Racing)
- Time: 00:22.1915

Fastest lap
- Driver: (Spain) Álex Palou (Chip Ganassi Racing)
- Time: 00:23.4287 (on lap 10 of 250)

Podium
- First: (Mexico) Pato O'Ward (Arrow McLaren)
- Second: (New Zealand) Scott McLaughlin (Team Penske)
- Third: (Denmark) Christian Lundgaard (Arrow McLaren)

Chronology
Previous	Next
2025	2027

The 2026 Snap-on IndyCar Weekend were a pair of IndyCar motor races scheduled to be held on August 29, 2026, and August 30, 2026, at the Milwaukee Mile in West Allis, Wisconsin. They were the 16th and 17th penultimate rounds of the 2026 IndyCar season.

Despite a section of the first race being moved to hours after the second race, Pato O'Ward won both races of the weekend, becoming the first driver since Rick Mears in 1982 to win two races on the same day. At the end of the second race, Álex Palou secured his fifth IndyCar Series championship and fourth in a row.

== Background ==
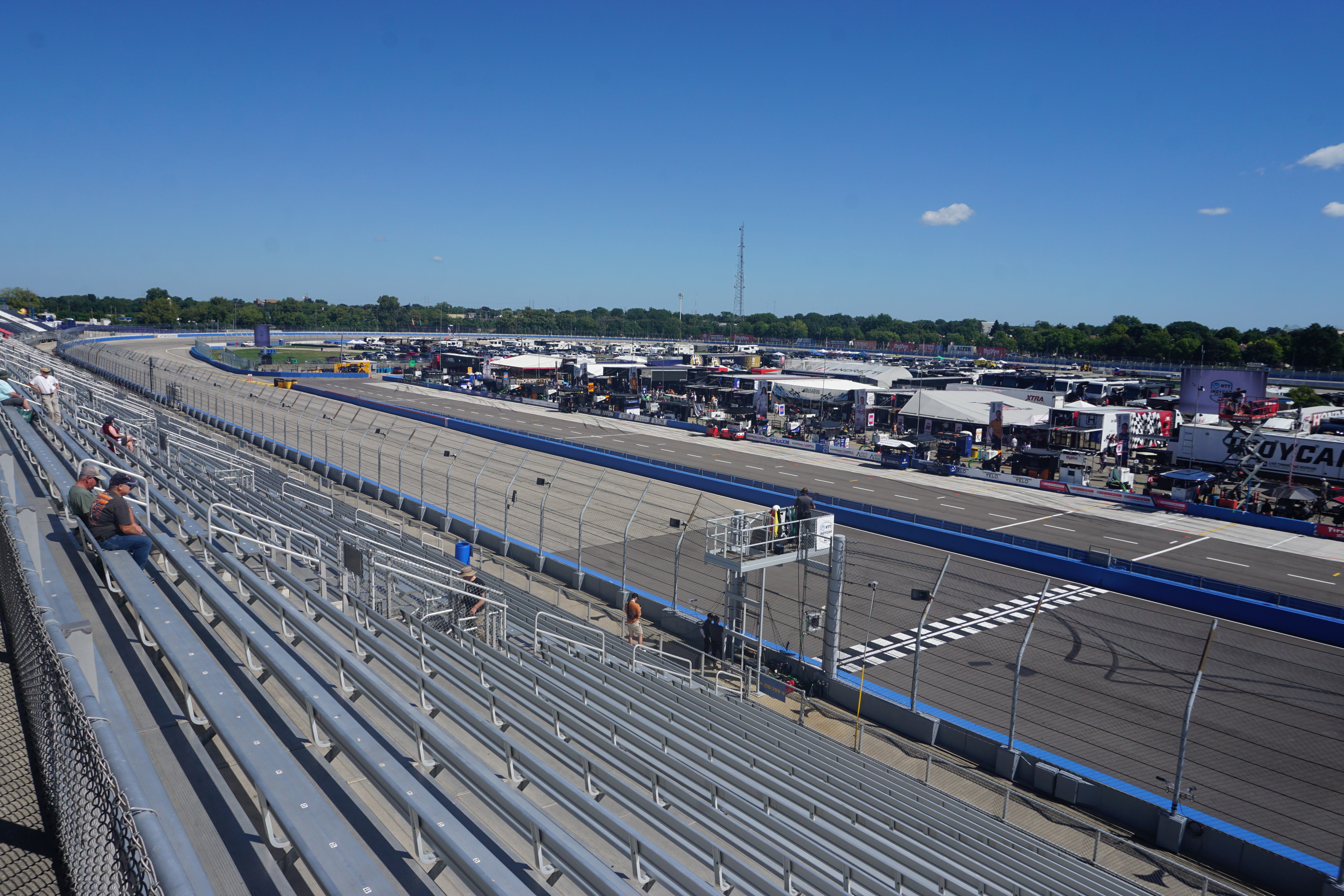
The Milwaukee Mile (pictured in 2024), the track where the race was held.

The Snap-on IndyCar Weekend, is held at the Milwaukee Mile in West Allis, Wisconsin on its 4-turn oval layout. As a 1-mile (1.61 km) track, it is also currently a points-paying race of the NTT IndyCar Series. The event is contested by "Indy Car", that is a formula of professional-level, single-seat, open cockpit, open-wheel, purpose-built race cars.

=== Championship standings before the race ===
Going into the race, Álex Palou led the 2026 IndyCar Series points championship, with a 91-point lead over Kyle Kirkwood. Palou leads the drivers this season with six victories and seven pole positions before the race. Kyle Kirkwood, Josef Newgarden and Christian Lundgaard have two wins each going into the race. Pato O'Ward, Marcus Ericsson, and Indy 500 winner Felix Rosenqvist each had one win.

=== Entry list ===
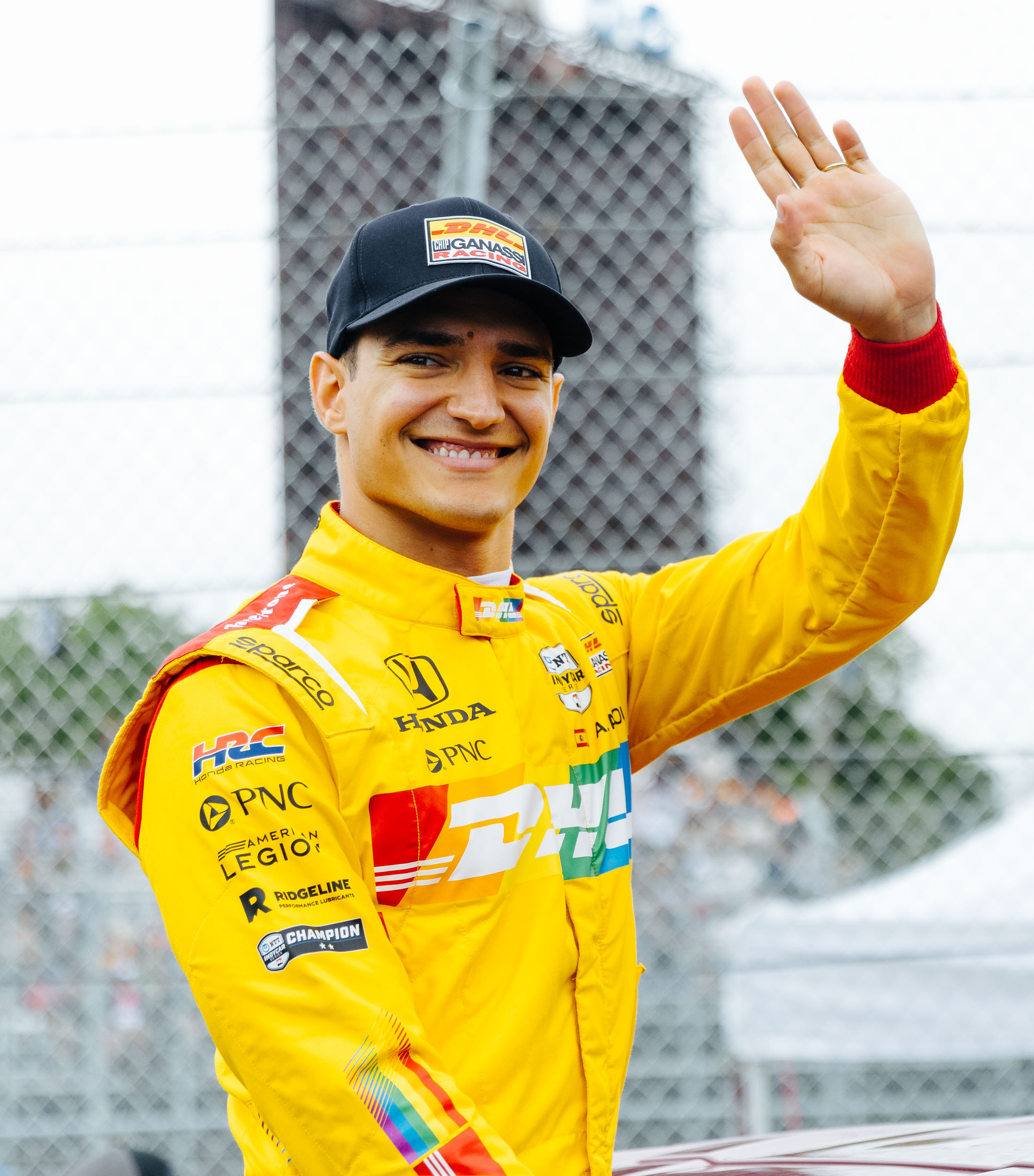
Four-time IndyCar Series champion Álex Palou (pictured in 2024) led the points standings entering the Snap-on Makers and Fixers 250.

Key	Meaning
R	Rookie
W	Past winner

No.	Driver	Team	Engine
2	(United States) Josef Newgarden	Team Penske	Chevrolet
3	(New Zealand) Scott McLaughlin W	Team Penske	Chevrolet
4	(Brazil) Caio Collet R	A.J. Foyt Racing	Chevrolet
5	(Mexico) Pato O'Ward W	Arrow McLaren	Chevrolet
6	(United States) Nolan Siegel	Arrow McLaren	Chevrolet
7	(Denmark) Christian Lundgaard	Arrow McLaren	Chevrolet
8	(Cayman Islands) Kyffin Simpson	Chip Ganassi Racing	Honda
9	(New Zealand) Scott Dixon W	Chip Ganassi Racing	Honda
10	(Spain) Álex Palou	Chip Ganassi Racing	Honda
12	(United States) David Malukas	Team Penske	Chevrolet
14	(United States) Santino Ferrucci	A.J. Foyt Racing	Chevrolet
15	(United States) Graham Rahal	Rahal Letterman Lanigan Racing	Honda
18	(France) Romain Grosjean	Dale Coyne Racing	Honda
19	(Norway) Dennis Hauger R	Dale Coyne Racing	Honda
20	(United States) Alexander Rossi	ECR	Chevrolet
21	(Denmark) Christian Rasmussen W	ECR	Chevrolet
26	(Australia) Will Power W	Andretti Global	Honda
27	(United States) Kyle Kirkwood	Andretti Global with Curb-Agajanian	Honda
28	(Sweden) Marcus Ericsson	Andretti Global	Honda
45	(United Kingdom) Louis Foster	Rahal Letterman Lanigan Racing	Honda
47	(Germany) Mick Schumacher R	Rahal Letterman Lanigan Racing	Honda
60	(Sweden) Felix Rosenqvist	Meyer Shank Racing with Curb-Agajanian	Honda
66	(New Zealand) Marcus Armstrong	Meyer Shank Racing with Curb-Agajanian	Honda
76	(Netherlands) Rinus VeeKay	Juncos Hollinger Racing	Chevrolet
77	(United States) Sting Ray Robb	Juncos Hollinger Racing	Chevrolet

== Practice ==
The first and only practice session was held on Friday, August 28, at 5:00 PM CST. Nolan Siegel crashed early on in the session, and later contact between Christian Rasmussen and Freedom 250 race winner Kyle Kirkwood ended the session for both of them as well.

Top Practice Speeds
Pos	No.	Driver	Team	Engine	Lap Time
1	2	(United States) Josef Newgarden	Team Penske	Chevrolet	22.9191
2	19	(Norway) Dennis Hauger R	Dale Coyne Racing	Honda	22.9266
3	10	(Spain) Álex Palou	Chip Ganassi Racing	Honda	22.9971
Official Report

== Race 1 - Snap-on Makers and Fixers 250 ==
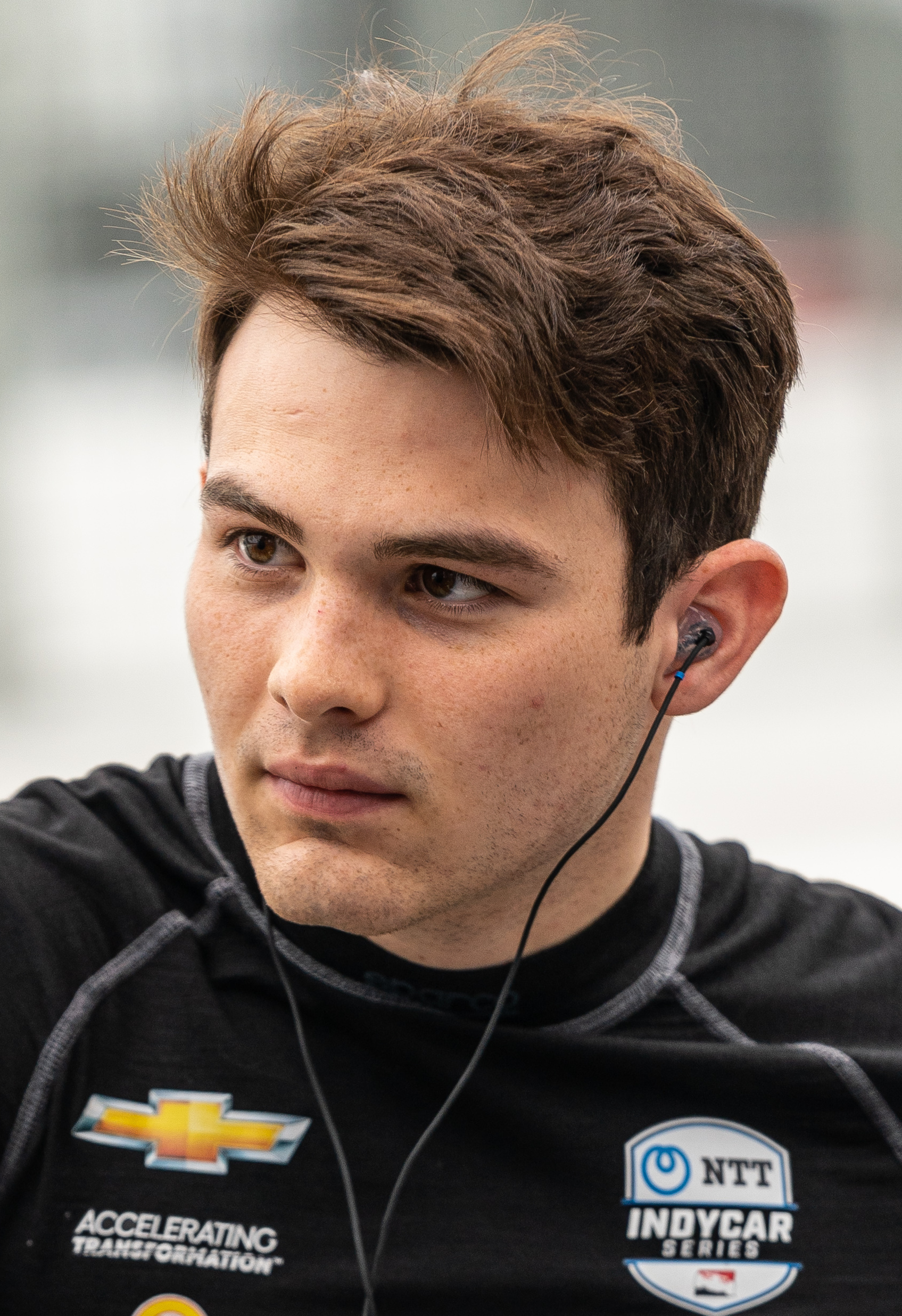
Pato O'Ward (pictured in 2021) won the Snap-on Makers and Fixers 250.

The 2026 Snap-on Makers and Fixers 250 was the sixteenth round of the 2026 IndyCar season. The race was originally scheduled to be held on August 29, 2026, in West Allis, Wisconsin at the Milwaukee Mile, but due to excessive rainfall in the Milwaukee-area, the race was postponed until after Race 2. The race was contested of 250 laps.

Pato O'Ward won the race. David Malukas finished 2nd, and Rinus VeeKay finished 3rd. Scott McLaughlin and Christian Rasmussen rounded out the top five, and Christian Lundgaard, Josef Newgarden, Marcus Ericsson, Marcus Armstrong, and Álex Palou rounded out the top ten.

=== Qualifying ===
Qualifying will be held at 10:00 AM CST on August 29, 2026. For qualifying, each entrant will turn two consecutive laps, with their first lap time counting towards Race 1 qualifying and their second lap counting for Race 2 qualifying.

==== Qualifying classification ====
Pos	No.	Driver	Team	Engine	Time	Final grid							
Pos	No.	Driver	Team	Engine	Time	Final grid	1	3	(New Zealand) Scott McLaughlin W	Team Penske	Chevrolet	22.0738	10
Pos	No.	Driver	Team	Engine	2	Final grid	10	(Spain) Álex Palou	Chip Ganassi Racing	Honda	22.2605	11	
3	12	(United States) David Malukas	Team Penske	Chevrolet	22.2726	12							
4	5	(Mexico) Pato O'Ward W	Arrow McLaren	Chevrolet	22.2779	1							
5	2	(United States) Josef Newgarden	Team Penske	Chevrolet	22.3117	2							
6	26	(Australia) Will Power W	Andretti Global	Honda	22.3869	3							
7	19	(Norway) Dennis Hauger R	Dale Coyne Racing	Honda	22.3908	4							
8	60	(Sweden) Felix Rosenqvist	Meyer Shank Racing	Honda	22.3920	5							
9	45	(United Kingdom) Louis Foster	Rahal Letterman Lanigan Racing	Chevrolet	22.4157	6							
10	7	(Denmark) Christian Lundgaard	Arrow McLaren	Chevrolet	22.4760	7							
11	20	(United States) Alexander Rossi	ECR	Chevrolet	22.4812	8							
12	18	(France) Romain Grosjean	Dale Coyne Racing	Honda	22.5029	9							
13	47	(Germany) Mick Schumacher R	Rahal Letterman Lanigan Racing	Honda	22.5078	13							
14	28	(Sweden) Marcus Ericsson	Andretti Global	Honda	22.5700	14							
15	9	(New Zealand) Scott Dixon W	Chip Ganassi Racing	Honda	22.5806	15							
16	66	(New Zealand) Marcus Armstrong	Meyer Shank Racing with Curb Agajanian	Honda	22.6727	16							
17	8	(Cayman Islands) Kyffin Simpson	Chip Ganassi Racing	Honda	22.6865	17							
18	21	(Denmark) Christian Rasmussen W	ECR	Chevrolet	22.6936	18							
19	76	(Netherlands) Rinus VeeKay	Juncos Hollinger Racing	Chevrolet	22.6988	24							
20	15	(United States) Graham Rahal	Rahal Letterman Lanigan Racing	Honda	22.7450	19							
21	4	(Brazil) Caio Collet R	A.J. Foyt Racing	Chevrolet	22.8328	20							
22	27	(United States) Kyle Kirkwood	Andretti Global	Honda	22.8491	21							
23	77	(United States) Sting Ray Robb	Juncos Hollinger Racing	Chevrolet	22.8999	25							
24	14	(United States) Santino Ferrucci	A. J. Foyt Racing	Chevrolet	22.9754	22							
25	6	(United States) Nolan Siegel	Arrow McLaren	Chevrolet	23.4292	23							
Official Report

=== Race ===
The race was delayed from its original starting time of 1:30 PM CST on August 29 due to rain. The race began just over an hour after it was intended, with the green flag flying at 2:35 PM. The race was red-flagged once again due to rain on lap 90 and postponed until Sunday, August 30 at 8:00 AM CST. However, due to continued rain, officials decided to hold the second race before, with the restart time for the first race at 5:00 PM CST.

==== Race classification ====
Pos	No.	Driver	Team	Engine	Laps	Time/Retired	Pit Stops	Grid	Laps Led	Pts.
1	5	(Mexico) Pato O'Ward	Arrow McLaren	Chevrolet	250	2:11:42.1669	3	1	119	53
2	12	(United States) David Malukas	Team Penske	Chevrolet	250	+1.7535	2	12	93	41
3	76	(Netherlands) Rinus VeeKay	Juncos Hollinger Racing	Chevrolet	250	+2.8641	3	24		35
4	3	(New Zealand) Scott McLaughlin W	Team Penske	Chevrolet	250	+5.2225	3	10		33
5	21	(Denmark) Christian Rasmussen W	ECR	Chevrolet	250	+7.2108	3	18	1	31
6	7	(Denmark) Christian Lundgaard	Arrow McLaren	Chevrolet	250	+7.7279	3	7	1	29
7	2	(United States) Josef Newgarden	Team Penske	Chevrolet	250	+8.8271	4	2		26
8	28	(Sweden) Marcus Ericsson	Andretti Global	Honda	250	+9.8435	3	14		24
9	66	(New Zealand) Marcus Armstrong	Meyer Shank Racing with Curb-Agajanian	Honda	250	+15.2149	2	16		22
10	10	(Spain) Álex Palou	Chip Ganassi Racing	Honda	250	+15.9026	3	11		20
11	45	(United Kingdom) Louis Foster	Rahal Letterman Lanigan Racing	Honda	250	+16.0861	3	6		19
12	47	(Germany) Mick Schumacher R	Rahal Letterman Lanigan Racing	Honda	250	+17.0485	3	13		18
13	6	(United States) Nolan Siegel	Arrow McLaren	Chevrolet	250	+17.6015	2	23		17
14	20	(United States) Alexander Rossi	ECR	Chevrolet	250	+18.1247	4	8		16
15	27	(United States) Kyle Kirkwood	Andretti Global	Honda	250	+20.8217	4	21		15
16	8	(Cayman Islands) Kyffin Simpson	Chip Ganassi Racing	Honda	250	+22.5506	4	17		14
17	60	(Sweden) Felix Rosenqvist	Meyer Shank Racing with Curb-Agajanian	Honda	250	+24.5998	3	5	30	14
18	9	(New Zealand) Scott Dixon W	Chip Ganassi Racing	Honda	249	+1 Lap	4	15		12
19	18	(France) Romain Grosjean	Dale Coyne Racing	Honda	249	+1 Lap	4	9	1	12
20	14	(United States) Santino Ferrucci	A.J. Foyt Enterprises	Chevrolet	248	+2 Laps	3	22		10
21	19	(Norway) Dennis Hauger R	Dale Coyne Racing	Honda	248	+2 Laps	3	4	2	10
22	77	(United States) Sting Ray Robb	Juncos Hollinger Racing	Chevrolet	248	+2 Laps	2	25		8
23	15	(United States) Graham Rahal	Rahal Letterman Lanigan Racing	Honda	246	+4 Laps	3	19		7
24	4	(Brazil) Caio Collet R	A.J. Foyt Enterprises	Chevrolet	211	Contact	2	20		6
25	26	(Australia) Will Power W	Andretti Global	Honda	199	Contact	3	3	3	6
Fastest lap: (Mexico) Pato O'Ward (Arrow McLaren) 22.9156(Lap 2)
Official Results

=== Championship standings after the race ===
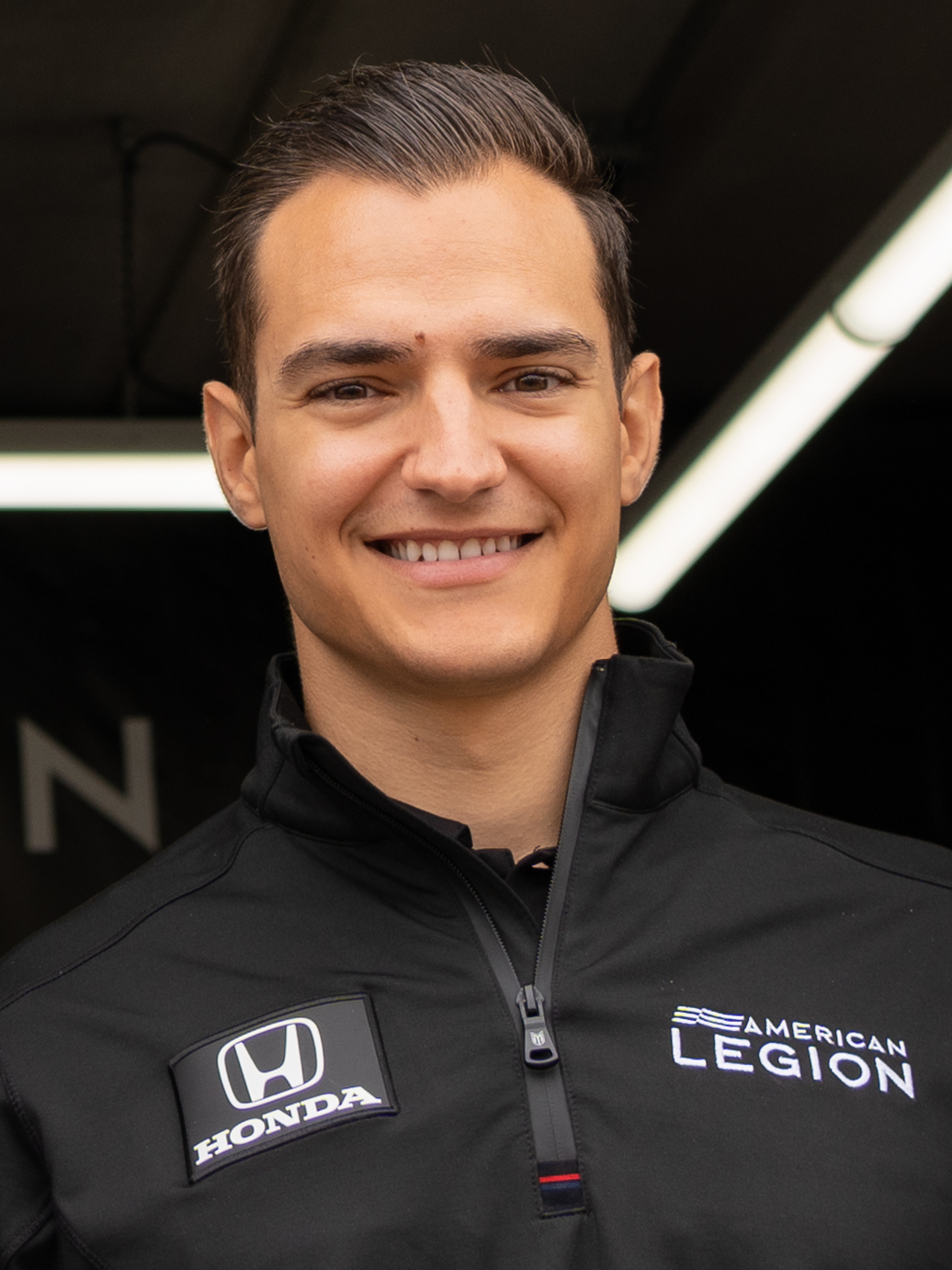
Álex Palou (pictured in 2023) clinched his fifth-series title after the Snap-on Makers and Fixers 250.

Drivers' Championship standings

	Pos.	Driver	Points
Unchanged	1	(Spain) Álex Palou	607
Plus	2	(Denmark) Christian Lundgaard	507 (–100)
Minus	3	(United States) Kyle Kirkwood	505 (–102)
Unchanged	4	(Mexico) Pato O'Ward	503 (–104)
Unchanged	5	(United States) David Malukas	484 (–123)

Engine manufacturer standings

	Pos.	Manufacturer	Points
Unchanged	1	Honda	1481
Unchanged	2	Chevrolet	1184 (–297)

- Note: Only the top five positions are included.

== Race 2 - Snap-on Milwaukee Mile 250 ==
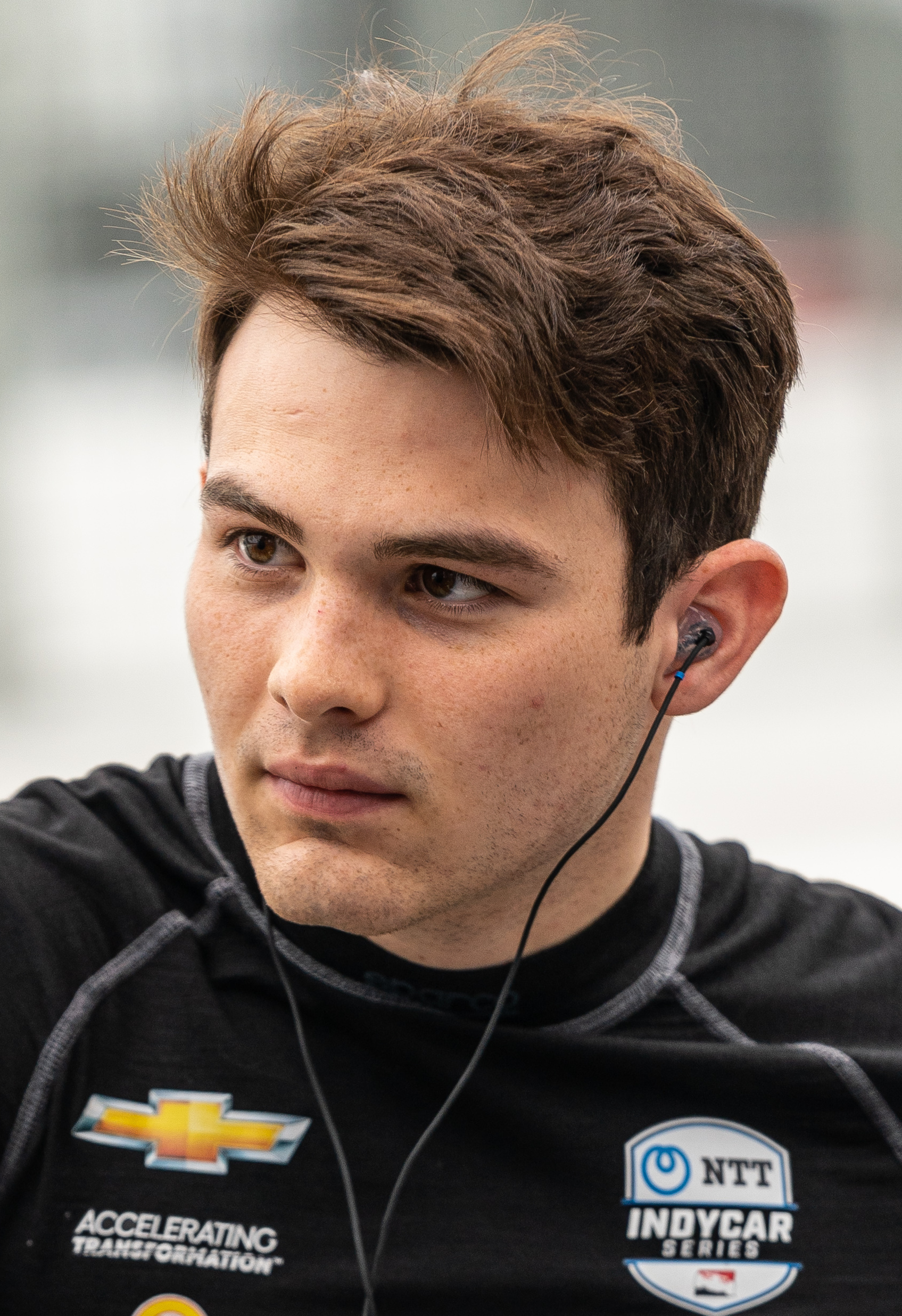
Pato O'Ward (pictured in 2021) won the Snap-on Milwaukee Mile 250.

The 2026 Snap-on Milwaukee Mile 250 was the seventeenth and penultimate round of the 2026 IndyCar season. The race was held on August 30, 2026, in West Allis, Wisconsin at the Milwaukee Mile. The race was contested of 250 laps.

Pato O'Ward won the race. Scott McLaughlin finished 2nd, and Christian Lundgaard finished 3rd. David Malukas and Álex Palou rounded out the top five, and Kyle Kirkwood, Rinus VeeKay, Christian Rasmussen, Marcus Ericsson, and Louis Foster rounded out the top ten.

=== Qualifying ===
Qualifying for Race 2 will take place at the same time as for Race 1. Each entrant will turn two consecutive laps, with their first lap time counting towards Race 1 qualifying and their second lap counting for Race 2 qualifying.

==== Qualifying classification ====
Pos	No.	Driver	Team	Engine	Time	Final grid							
Pos	No.	Driver	Team	Engine	Time	Final grid	1	10	(Spain) Álex Palou	Chip Ganassi Racing	Honda	22.1915	1
Pos	No.	Driver	Team	Engine	2	Final grid	5	(Mexico) Pato O'Ward W	Arrow McLaren	Chevrolet	22.1918	2	
3	2	(United States) Josef Newgarden	Team Penske	Chevrolet	22.3122	3							
4	47	(Germany) Mick Schumacher R	Rahal Letterman Lanigan Racing	Honda	22.3837	4							
5	26	(Australia) Will Power W	Andretti Global	Honda	22.3838	5							
6	45	(United Kingdom) Louis Foster	Rahal Letterman Lanigan Racing	Chevrolet	22.4295	6							
7	60	(Sweden) Felix Rosenqvist	Meyer Shank Racing	Honda	22.4631	7							
8	3	(New Zealand) Scott McLaughlin W	Team Penske	Chevrolet	22.4778	8							
9	66	(New Zealand) Marcus Armstrong	Meyer Shank Racing with Curb Agajanian	Honda	22.5096	9							
10	9	(New Zealand) Scott Dixon W	Chip Ganassi Racing	Honda	22.5343	10							
11	7	(Denmark) Christian Lundgaard	Arrow McLaren	Chevrolet	22.5435	11							
12	76	(Netherlands) Rinus VeeKay	Juncos Hollinger Racing	Chevrolet	22.5868	12							
13	28	(Sweden) Marcus Ericsson	Andretti Global	Honda	22.6081	13							
14	12	(United States) David Malukas	Team Penske	Chevrolet	22.6093	14							
15	19	(Norway) Dennis Hauger R	Dale Coyne Racing	Honda	22.6600	15							
16	20	(United States) Alexander Rossi	ECR	Chevrolet	22.7316	16							
17	21	(Denmark) Christian Rasmussen W	ECR	Chevrolet	22.7793	17							
18	8	(Cayman Islands) Kyffin Simpson	Chip Ganassi Racing	Honda	22.7929	18							
19	15	(United States) Graham Rahal	Rahal Letterman Lanigan Racing	Honda	22.7935	19							
20	18	(France) Romain Grosjean	Dale Coyne Racing	Honda	22.8005	20							
21	4	(Brazil) Caio Collet R	A.J. Foyt Racing	Chevrolet	22.8593	21							
22	14	(United States) Santino Ferrucci	A. J. Foyt Racing	Chevrolet	22.8955	22							
23	77	(United States) Sting Ray Robb	Juncos Hollinger Racing	Chevrolet	22.9246	23							
24	27	(United States) Kyle Kirkwood	Andretti Global	Honda	22.9474	24							
25	6	(United States) Nolan Siegel	Arrow McLaren	Chevrolet	23.1627	25							
Official Report

=== Race ===
The race was held at 12:00 PM CST on August 30, 2026.

==== Race classification ====
Pos	No.	Driver	Team	Engine	Laps	Time/Retired	Pit Stops	Grid	Laps Led	Pts.
1	5	(Mexico) Pato O'Ward W	Arrow McLaren	Chevrolet	250	1:57:50.2411	5	2	55	51
2	3	(New Zealand) Scott McLaughlin W	Team Penske	Chevrolet	250	+0.7916	4	8	28	41
3	7	(Denmark) Christian Lundgaard	Arrow McLaren	Chevrolet	250	+2.7457	5	11		35
4	12	(United States) David Malukas	Team Penske	Chevrolet	250	+3.2885	5	14		32
5	10	(Spain) Álex Palou	Chip Ganassi Racing	Honda	250	+12.0439	5	1	115	34
6	27	(United States) Kyle Kirkwood	Andretti Global	Honda	250	+17.5310	5	24		28
7	76	(Netherlands) Rinus VeeKay	Juncos Hollinger Racing	Chevrolet	250	+18.7000	5	12	25	27
8	21	(Denmark) Christian Rasmussen W	Ed Carpenter Racing	Chevrolet	250	+22.7837	5	17	2	25
9	28	(Sweden) Marcus Ericsson	Andretti Global	Honda	250	+24.0838	5	13		22
10	45	(United Kingdom) Louis Foster	Rahal Letterman Lanigan Racing	Honda	250	+26.8617	5	6		20
11	20	(United States) Alexander Rossi	Ed Carpenter Racing	Chevrolet	249	+1 Lap	5	16		19
12	14	(United States) Santino Ferrucci	A. J. Foyt Enterprises	Chevrolet	249	+1 Lap	5	22		18
13	47	(Germany) Mick Schumacher R	Rahal Letterman Lanigan Racing	Honda	249	+1 Lap	5	4		17
14	26	(Australia) Will Power W	Andretti Global	Honda	249	+1 Lap	6	5	19	17
15	9	(New Zealand) Scott Dixon W	Chip Ganassi Racing	Honda	249	+1 Lap	5	10	1	16
16	66	(New Zealand) Marcus Armstrong	Meyer Shank Racing	Honda	249	+1 Lap	6	9		14
17	6	(United States) Nolan Siegel	Arrow McLaren	Chevrolet	249	+1 Lap	5	25		13
18	77	(United States) Sting Ray Robb	Juncos Hollinger Racing	Chevrolet	248	+2 Laps	5	23		12
19	8	(Cayman Islands) Kyffin Simpson	Chip Ganassi Racing	Honda	248	+2 Laps	5	18		11
20	60	(Sweden) Felix Rosenqvist	Meyer Shank Racing	Honda	248	+2 Laps	5	7		10
21	19	(Norway) Dennis Hauger R	Dale Coyne Racing	Honda	248	+2 Laps	5	15		9
22	15	(United States) Graham Rahal	Rahal Letterman Lanigan Racing	Honda	247	+3 Laps	5	19		8
23	4	(Brazil) Caio Collet R	A. J. Foyt Enterprises	Chevrolet	246	+4 Laps	4	21		7
24	18	(France) Romain Grosjean	Dale Coyne Racing	Honda	155	Contact	4	20		6
25	2	(United States) Josef Newgarden	Team Penske	Chevrolet	150	Contact	4	3	5	6
Fastest lap: (Spain) Álex Palou (Chip Ganassi Racing) 23.4287(Lap 2)
Official Results

=== Championship standings after the race ===
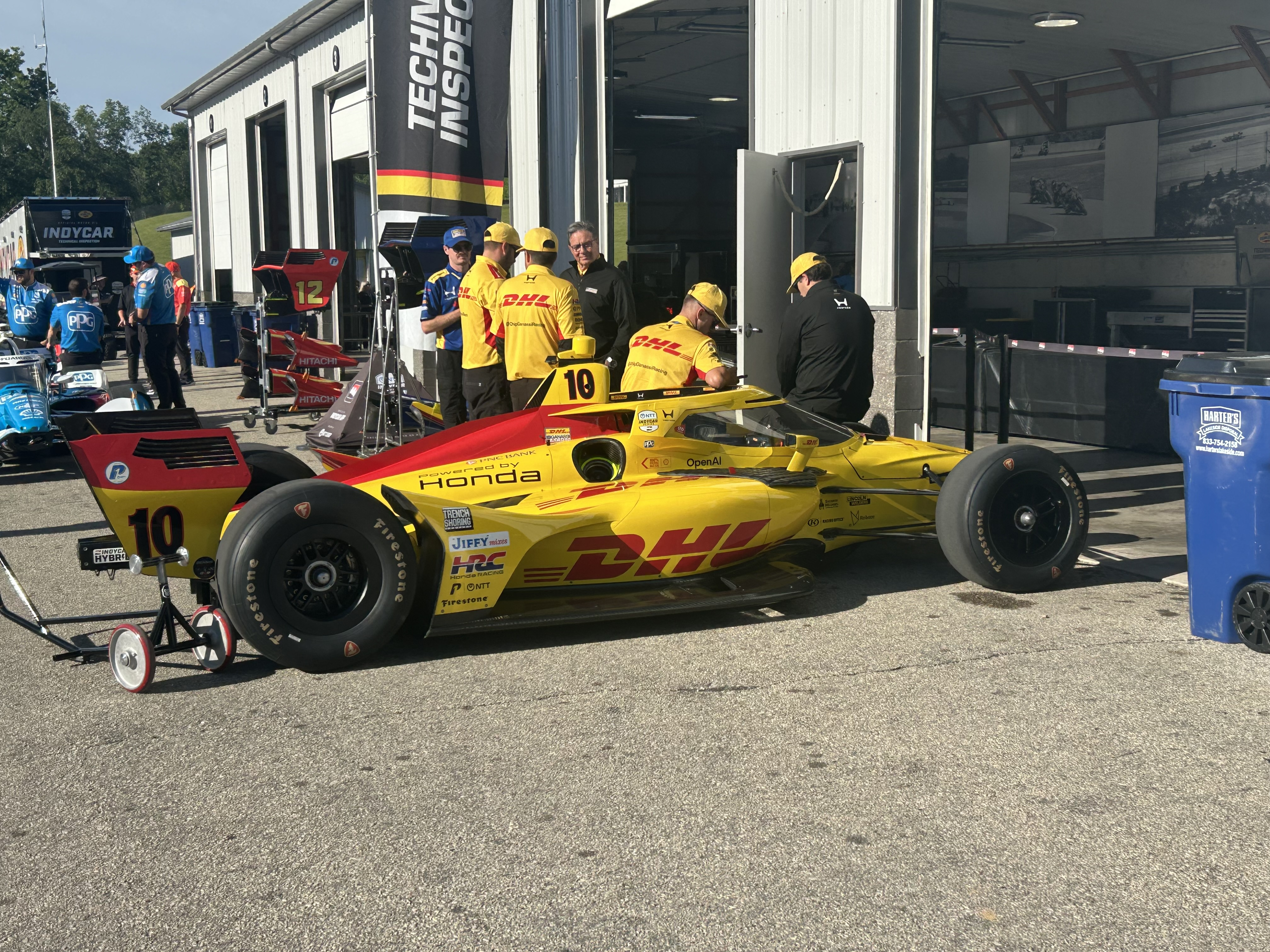
Honda clinched their twelfth engine manufacturer championship. (Álex Palou's Honda at Road America in 2026.)

Drivers' Championship standings

	Pos.	Driver	Points
Unchanged	1	(Spain) Álex Palou	587
Unchanged	2	(United States) Kyle Kirkwood	490 (–97)
Unchanged	3	(Denmark) Christian Lundgaard	478 (–109)
Unchanged	4	(Mexico) Pato O'Ward	450 (–137)
Unchanged	5	(United States) David Malukas	443 (–144)

Engine manufacturer standings

	Pos.	Manufacturer	Points
Unchanged	1	Honda	1406
Unchanged	2	Chevrolet	1134 (–272)

- Note: Only the top five positions are included.

Previous race: Freedom 250 Grand Prix	IndyCar Series; 2026 season	Next race: 2026 Mission Grand Prix of Monterey
Previous race: 2025 Snap-on Milwaukee Mile 250	Snap-on IndyCar Weekend	Next race: 2027 Snap-on Milwaukee Mile 250
