= 2026 Bommarito Automotive Group 500 =

Indycar race held in Madison, Illinois

(United States) 2026 Bommarito Automotive Group 500
Race details
9th round of the 2026 IndyCar season
← Previous race	Next race →
- Layout of the World Wide Technology Raceway
- Date: June 7, 2026
- Official name: Bommarito Automotive Group 500 presented by Axalta and Valvoline
- Location: World Wide Technology Raceway, Madison, Illinois
- Course: Permanent racing facility 1.25 mi / 2.01 km
- Distance: 260 laps 325 mi / 523 km

Pole position
- Driver: (Spain) Álex Palou (Chip Ganassi Racing)
- Time: 51.6195

Fastest lap
- Driver: (United States) Josef Newgarden (Team Penske)
- Time: (on lap of 260)

Podium
- First: (United States) Josef Newgarden (Team Penske)
- Second: (Sweden) Marcus Ericsson (Andretti Global)
- Third: (Denmark) Christian Rasmussen (ECR)

Chronology
Previous	Next
2025	2027

The 2026 Bommarito Automotive Group 500 presented by Axalta and Valvoline was the ninth round of the 2026 IndyCar season. The race was held on June 7, 2026, in Madison, Illinois at World Wide Technology Raceway. The race was contested of 260 laps. Josef Newgarden won the race. Marcus Ericsson finished 2nd, and Christian Rasmussen finished 3rd. Rinus VeeKay and Scott McLaughlin rounded out the top five, and Kyle Kirkwood, David Malukas, Will Power, Marcus Armstrong, and Christian Lundgaard rounded out the top ten.

== Race background ==
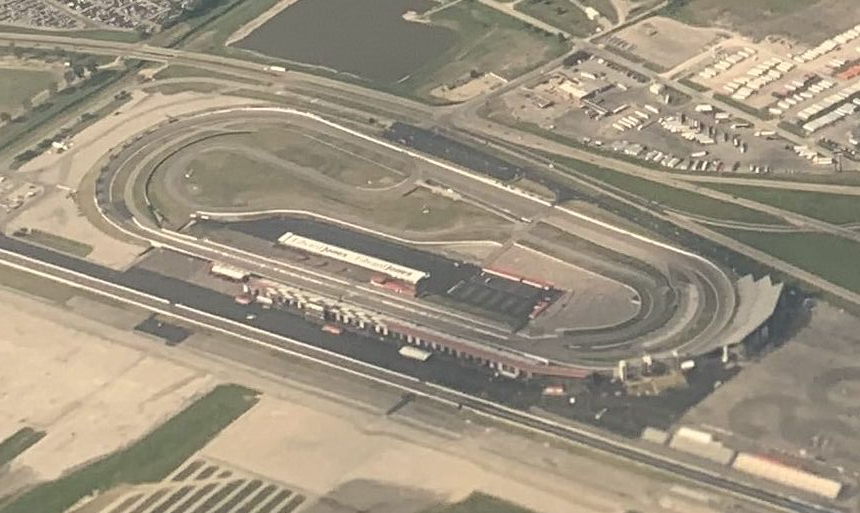
World Wide Technology Raceway, the track where the race was held.

The Bommarito Automotive Group 500, is held at World Wide Technology Raceway in Madison, Illinois on its 4-turn egg-shaped oval layout. A 1.25-mile (2.01 km) track, it is currently a points-paying race of the NTT IndyCar Series. The event is contested by "Indy Car", that is a formula of professional-level, single-seat, open cockpit, open-wheel, purpose-built race cars.

== Entry list ==
Key	Meaning
R	Rookie
W	Past winner

No.	Driver	Team	Engine
2	(United States) Josef Newgarden W	Team Penske	Chevrolet
3	(New Zealand) Scott McLaughlin	Team Penske	Chevrolet
4	(Brazil) Caio Collet R	A.J. Foyt Racing	Chevrolet
5	(Mexico) Pato O'Ward	Arrow McLaren	Chevrolet
6	(United States) Nolan Siegel	Arrow McLaren	Chevrolet
7	(Denmark) Christian Lundgaard	Arrow McLaren	Chevrolet
8	(Cayman Islands) Kyffin Simpson	Chip Ganassi Racing	Honda
9	(New Zealand) Scott Dixon W	Chip Ganassi Racing	Honda
10	(Spain) Álex Palou	Chip Ganassi Racing	Honda
12	(United States) David Malukas	Team Penske	Chevrolet
14	(United States) Santino Ferrucci	A. J. Foyt Racing	Chevrolet
15	(United States) Graham Rahal	Rahal Letterman Lanigan Racing	Honda
18	(France) Romain Grosjean	Dale Coyne Racing	Honda
19	(Norway) Dennis Hauger R	Dale Coyne Racing	Honda
20	(United States) Alexander Rossi	ECR	Chevrolet
21	(Denmark) Christian Rasmussen	ECR	Chevrolet
26	(Australia) Will Power W	Andretti Global	Honda
27	(United States) Kyle Kirkwood W	Andretti Global with Curb-Agajanian	Honda
28	(Sweden) Marcus Ericsson	Andretti Global	Honda
45	(United Kingdom) Louis Foster	Rahal Letterman Lanigan Racing	Honda
47	(Germany) Mick Schumacher R	Rahal Letterman Lanigan Racing	Honda
60	(Sweden) Felix Rosenqvist	Meyer Shank Racing with Curb-Agajanian	Honda
66	(New Zealand) Marcus Armstrong	Meyer Shank Racing with Curb-Agajanian	Honda
76	(Netherlands) Rinus VeeKay	Juncos Hollinger Racing	Chevrolet
77	(United States) Sting Ray Robb	Juncos Hollinger Racing	Chevrolet

== Practice ==
Top Practice Speeds
Pos	No.	Driver	Team	Engine	Lap Time
1	5	(Mexico) Pato O'Ward	Arrow McLaren	Chevrolet	26.0574
2	10	(Spain) Álex Palou	Chip Ganassi Racing	Honda	26.1266
3	60	(Sweden) Felix Rosenqvist	Meyer Shank Racing	Honda	26.1517

== Qualifying ==
Qualifying was held at 3:30 PM CST on June 6, 2026.

=== Qualifying classification ===
Pos	No.	Driver	Team	Engine	Time	Final grid							
Pos	No.	Driver	Team	Engine	Time	Final grid	1	10	(Spain) Álex Palou	Chip Ganassi Racing	Honda	51.6195	1
Pos	No.	Driver	Team	Engine	2	Final grid	12	(United States) David Malukas	Team Penske	Chevrolet	51.9500	2	
3	27	(United States) Kyle Kirkwood W	Andretti Global	Honda	51.9612	3							
4	60	(Sweden) Felix Rosenqvist	Meyer Shank Racing	Honda	52.0373	4							
5	3	(New Zealand) Scott McLaughlin	Team Penske	Chevrolet	52.0625	5							
6	66	(New Zealand) Marcus Armstrong	Meyer Shank Racing with Curb Agajanian	Honda	52.1792	6							
7	9	(New Zealand) Scott Dixon W	Chip Ganassi Racing	Honda	52.1807	7							
8	2	(United States) Josef Newgarden W	Team Penske	Chevrolet	52.1996	8							
9	5	(Mexico) Pato O'Ward	Arrow McLaren	Chevrolet	52.3280	9							
10	20	(United States) Alexander Rossi	ECR	Chevrolet	52.3490	10							
11	15	(United States) Graham Rahal	Rahal Letterman Lanigan Racing	Honda	52.4847	11							
12	28	(Sweden) Marcus Ericsson	Andretti Global	Honda	52.5136	12							
13	76	(Netherlands) Rinus VeeKay	Juncos Hollinger Racing	Chevrolet	52.5701	13							
14	8	(Cayman Islands) Kyffin Simpson	Chip Ganassi Racing	Honda	52.5859	14							
15	14	(United States) Santino Ferrucci	A. J. Foyt Racing	Chevrolet	52.6352	15							
16	7	(Denmark) Christian Lundgaard	Arrow McLaren	Chevrolet	52.6450	16							
17	45	(United Kingdom) Louis Foster	Rahal Letterman Lanigan Racing	Chevrolet	52.7645	17							
18	47	(Germany) Mick Schumacher R	Rahal Letterman Lanigan Racing	Honda	52.8510	18							
19	21	(Denmark) Christian Rasmussen	ECR	Chevrolet	52.9083	19							
20	4	(Brazil) Caio Collet R	A.J. Foyt Racing	Chevrolet	52.9089	20							
21	26	(Australia) Will Power W	Andretti Global	Honda	53.0442	21							
22	6	(United States) Nolan Siegel	Arrow McLaren	Chevrolet	53.2334	22							
23	18	(France) Romain Grosjean	Dale Coyne Racing	Honda	53.2492	23							
24	19	(Norway) Dennis Hauger R	Dale Coyne Racing	Honda	53.3394	24							
25	77	(United States) Sting Ray Robb	Juncos Hollinger Racing	Chevrolet	53.5514	25							
Official Report

== Practice (post-qualifying) ==
There was a practice session using the high-line. David Malukas led the session.

=== Final practice ===
Top Practice Speeds
Pos	No.	Driver	Team	Engine	Lap Time
1	7	(Denmark) Christian Lundgaard	Arrow McLaren	Chevrolet	26.5032
2	9	(New Zealand) Scott Dixon W	Chip Ganassi Racing	Honda	26.5308
3	66	(New Zealand) Marcus Armstrong	Meyer Shank Racing	Honda	26.5368

== Race ==
The race was held at 8:00 PM CST on June 7, 2026.

=== Race classification ===
Pos	No.	Driver	Team	Engine	Laps	Time/Retired	Pit Stops	Grid	Laps Led	Pts.
1	2	(United States) Josef Newgarden W	Team Penske	Chevrolet	260	2:25:26.7673	5	8	53	51
2	28	(Sweden) Marcus Ericsson	Andretti Global	Honda	260	2:25:27.4286	4	12	114	43
3	21	(Denmark) Christian Rasmussen	ECR	Chevrolet	260	2:25:28.6196	4	19	5	36
4	76	(Netherlands) Rinus VeeKay	Juncos Hollinger Racing	Chevrolet	260	2:25:30.2020	4	13	-	32
5	3	(New Zealand) Scott McLaughlin	Team Penske	Chevrolet	260	2:25:33.9898	5	5	-	30
6	27	(United States) Kyle Kirkwood W	Andretti Global	Honda	260	2:25:34.7153	4	3	-	28
7	12	(United States) David Malukas	Team Penske	Chevrolet	260	2:25:35.1357	3	2	-	26
8	26	(Australia) Will Power W	Andretti Global	Honda	260	2:25:36.1043	5	21	-	24
9	66	(New Zealand) Marcus Armstrong	Meyer Shank Racing with Curb Agajanian	Honda	260	2:25:36.4923	5	6	-	22
10	7	(Denmark) Christian Lundgaard	Arrow McLaren	Chevrolet	260	2:25:36.8075	6	16	-	20
11	5	(Mexico) Pato O'Ward	Arrow McLaren	Chevrolet	260	2:25:37.6365	6	9	-	19
12	9	(New Zealand) Scott Dixon W	Chip Ganassi Racing	Honda	260	2:25:38.2958	4	7	32	19
13	14	(United States) Santino Ferrucci	A. J. Foyt Racing	Chevrolet	260	2:25:42.1806	4	15	-	17
14	60	(Sweden) Felix Rosenqvist	Meyer Shank Racing	Honda	260	2:25:45.6001	4	4	-	16
15	18	(France) Romain Grosjean	Dale Coyne Racing	Honda	259	2:25:42.4297	4	23	-	15
16	47	(Germany) Mick Schumacher R	Rahal Letterman Lanigan Racing	Honda	259	2:25:42.5826	4	18	-	14
17	10	(Spain) Álex Palou	Chip Ganassi Racing	Honda	258	2:25:46.4373	4	1	49	15
18	20	(United States) Alexander Rossi	ECR	Chevrolet	258	2:25:48.0058	4	10	-	12
19	77	(United States) Sting Ray Robb	Juncos Hollinger Racing	Chevrolet	257	2:25:52.5157	3	25	-	11
20	45	(United Kingdom) Louis Foster	Rahal Letterman Lanigan Racing	Chevrolet	250	2:25:52.1131	5	17	-	10
21	8	(Cayman Islands) Kyffin Simpson	Chip Ganassi Racing	Honda	236	2:25:53.5851	2	14	-	9
22	4	(Brazil) Caio Collet R	A.J. Foyt Racing	Chevrolet	226	Mechanical	4	20	7	9
23	15	(United States) Graham Rahal	Rahal Letterman Lanigan Racing	Honda	112	Contact	2	11	-	7
24	6	(United States) Nolan Siegel	Arrow McLaren	Chevrolet	53	Contact	1	22	-	6
25	19	(Norway) Dennis Hauger R	Dale Coyne Racing	Honda	-	Mechanical	-	24	-	5
Fastest lap: (United States) Josef Newgarden (Team Penske) - 26.5257 (Lap 219)
Official Report

== Championship standings after the race ==
Drivers' Championship standings

	Pos.	Driver	Points
Unchanged	1	(Spain) Álex Palou	342
Unchanged	2	(United States) Kyle Kirkwood	293
Unchanged	3	(United States) David Malukas	274
Unchanged	4	(Denmark) Christian Lundgaard	246
Unchanged	5	(Mexico) Pato O'Ward	239

Engine manufacturer standings

	Pos.	Manufacturer	Points
Unchanged	1	Honda	759
Unchanged	2	Chevrolet	677

- Note: Only the top five positions are included.

Previous race: 2026 Chevrolet Detroit Grand Prix	IndyCar Series; 2026 season	Next race: 2026 XPEL Grand Prix at Road America
Previous race: 2025 Bommarito Automotive Group 500	Bommarito Automotive Group 500	Next race: 2027 Bommarito Automotive Group 500
