= 2026 IndyCar Series =

American auto racing season

2026 IndyCar season
- NTT IndyCar Series

Season
- Races: 18
- Start date: March 1
- End date: September 6

Awards
- Drivers' champion: (Spain) Álex Palou
- Manufacturers' Cup: (Japan) Honda
- Rookie of the Year: (Norway) Dennis Hauger
- Indianapolis 500 winner: (Sweden) Felix Rosenqvist

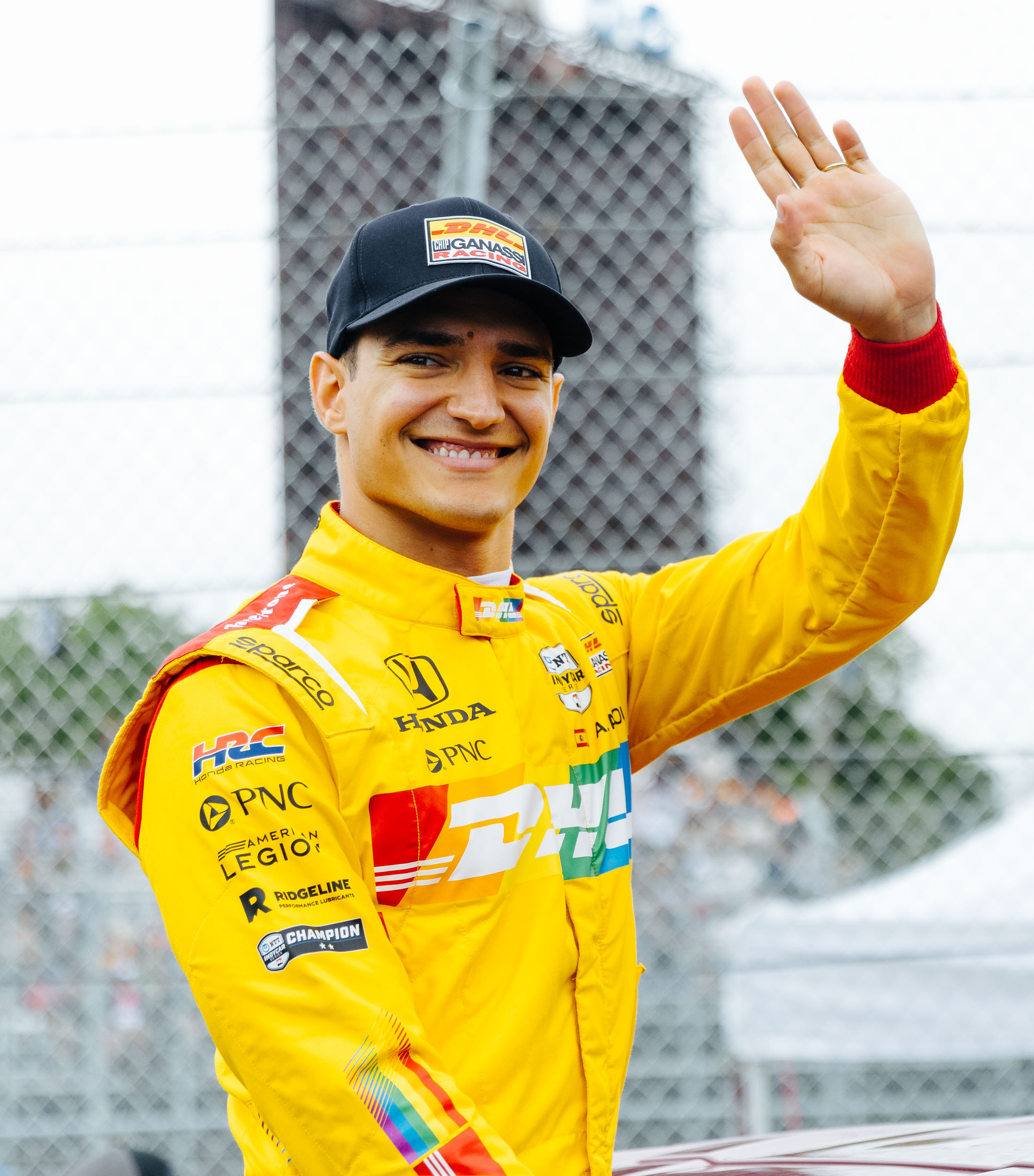
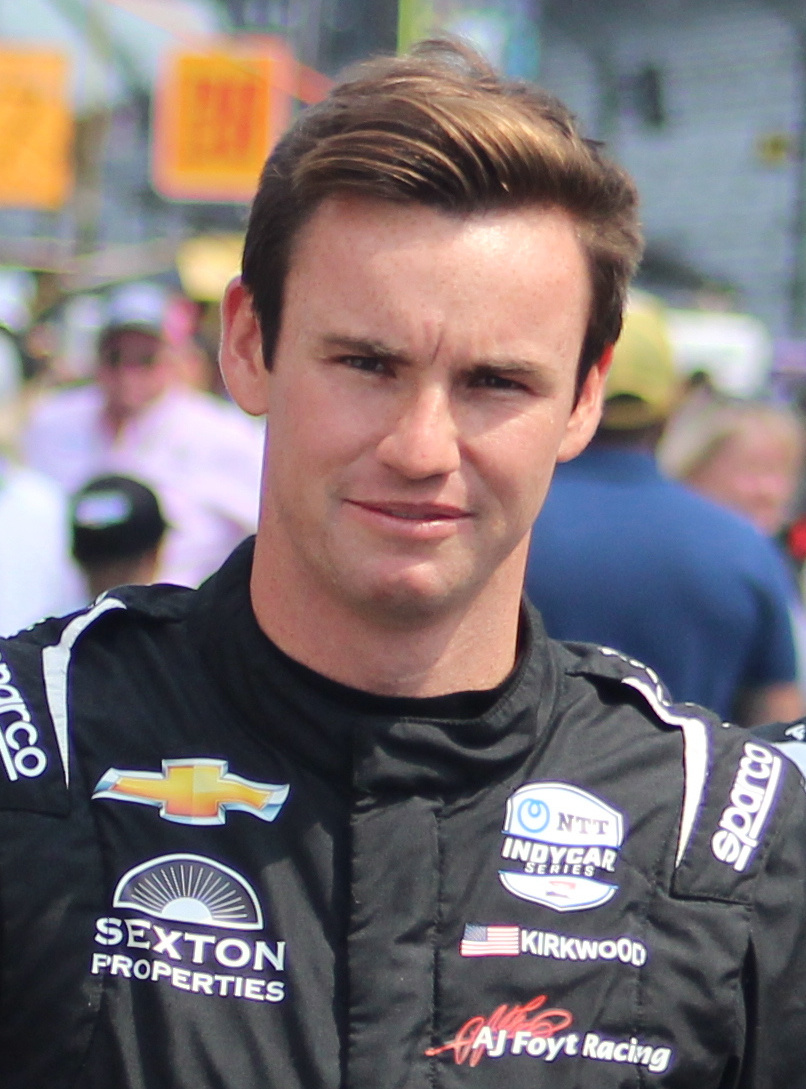
Álex Palou (left) won his fifth championship in six seasons. Kyle Kirkwood (right) finished in second place by 86 points.

The 2026 NTT IndyCar Series was the 115th official championship season of American open-wheel racing and the 31st season under IndyCar Series sanction. Its showcase event was the 110th Running of the Indianapolis 500. The series also raced in Washington, D.C. for the Freedom 250 Grand Prix.

Álex Palou, who entered the season as defending Indianapolis 500 winner and champion, earned his fourth consecutive title, and fifth IndyCar title overall with Chip Ganassi Racing, with one race to spare. This put Palou third on the all-time list behind A. J. Foyt (7) and teammate Scott Dixon (6). Felix Rosenqvist won his first Indianapolis 500 for Meyer Shank Racing, beating David Malukas in the closest photo finish in the event's history, while Honda won its twelfth Manufacturers' Cup, the second in a row.

== Background and series news ==
- On September 12, 2024, IndyCar announced that the Firestone Tire and Rubber Company had signed an extension to remain as the series' sole tire supplier until at least the 2030 season.
- On July 31, 2025, Fox Sports parent company Fox Corporation announced that it had acquired a one-third stake in IndyCar parent company Penske Entertainment. As part of the acquisition, Fox Sports' TV contract was extended to 2030.
- On December 11, 2025, IndyCar announced a new three-person independent officiating board, named IndyCar Officiating Inc. Two members – Ray Evernham and Raj Nair – were voted on to the panel by IndyCar team owners, while the third member – Ronan Morgan – was appointed by the FIA. Scot Elkins was later announced as the managing director of officiating.
- On February 12, 2026, it was announced Chevrolet and Honda had signed a multi-year contract extension which would keep them in the series when it switches to 2.4-liter twin-turbo hybrid V6 engines in 2028. Each manufacturer was announced to receive a single charter entry as part of the agreement.
- On April 28, 2026, IndyCar announced a new rule that non-chartered entries would not be permitted to race outside the Indianapolis 500 beginning with the 2027 season.

== Confirmed entries ==
The following teams, entries, and drivers competed in the 2026 NTT IndyCar Series season. All teams used a Dallara DW12 chassis with 2018 universal aero kit and Firestone tires.

Team	Engine	No.	Driver(s)	Round(s)	Ref(s)
Abel Motorsports	Chevrolet	51	(United States) Jacob Abel	7	
A. J. Foyt Enterprises (Note: Technical partnership with Team Penske.)	Chevrolet	4	(Brazil) Caio Collet R	All	
A. J. Foyt Enterprises	Chevrolet	14	(United States) Santino Ferrucci	All	
HMD Motorsports with A. J. Foyt Racing	Chevrolet	11	(United Kingdom) Katherine Legge	7	
Andretti Global	Honda	26	(Australia) Will Power	All	
Andretti Global	Honda	27	(United States) Kyle Kirkwood (Note: with Curb-Agajanian)	All	
Andretti Global	Honda	28	(Sweden) Marcus Ericsson	All	
Arrow McLaren	Chevrolet	5	(Mexico) Pato O'Ward	All	
Arrow McLaren	Chevrolet	6	(United States) Nolan Siegel	All	
Arrow McLaren	Chevrolet	7	(Denmark) Christian Lundgaard	All	
Arrow McLaren	Chevrolet	31	(United States) Ryan Hunter-Reay (Note: with Legacy Motor Club)	7	
Chip Ganassi Racing	Honda	8	(Cayman Islands) Kyffin Simpson	All	
Chip Ganassi Racing	Honda	9	(New Zealand) Scott Dixon	All	
Chip Ganassi Racing	Honda	10	(Spain) Álex Palou	All	
Dale Coyne Racing (Note: Technical partnership with Andretti Global.)	Honda	18	(France) Romain Grosjean	All	
Dale Coyne Racing	Honda	19	(Norway) Dennis Hauger RY	All	
Dreyer & Reinbold Racing	Chevrolet	23	(United States) Conor Daly	7	
Dreyer & Reinbold Racing	Chevrolet	24	(United Kingdom) Jack Harvey	7	
Ed Carpenter Racing	Chevrolet	20	(United States) Alexander Rossi	All	
Ed Carpenter Racing	Chevrolet	21	(Denmark) Christian Rasmussen	All	
Ed Carpenter Racing	Chevrolet	33	(United States) Ed Carpenter	7	
Juncos Hollinger Racing	Chevrolet	76	(Netherlands) Rinus VeeKay (Note: with Dreyer & Reinbold Racing for Indianapolis 500 only)	All	
Juncos Hollinger Racing	Chevrolet	77	(United States) Sting Ray Robb	All	
Meyer Shank Racing (Note: Technical partnership with Chip Ganassi Racing.) with Curb-Agajanian	Honda	06	(Brazil) Hélio Castroneves	7	
Meyer Shank Racing with Curb-Agajanian	Honda	60	(Sweden) Felix Rosenqvist	All	
Meyer Shank Racing with Curb-Agajanian	Honda	66	(New Zealand) Marcus Armstrong	All	
Rahal Letterman Lanigan Racing	Honda	15	(United States) Graham Rahal	All	
Rahal Letterman Lanigan Racing	Honda	45	(United Kingdom) Louis Foster	All	
Rahal Letterman Lanigan Racing	Honda	47	(Germany) Mick Schumacher R	All	
Rahal Letterman Lanigan Racing	Honda	75	(Japan) Takuma Sato	7	
Team Penske	Chevrolet	2	(United States) Josef Newgarden	All	
Team Penske	Chevrolet	3	(New Zealand) Scott McLaughlin	All	
Team Penske	Chevrolet	12	(United States) David Malukas	All	

Icon	Status
R	Eligible for Rookie of the Year
RY	Rookie of the Year

=== Driver changes ===
==== Preseason ====
- On September 2, 2025, Team Penske confirmed reports that Will Power would depart the team, having driven for the team since the 2009 season.
- On September 2, Rinus VeeKay confirmed that he would not return to Dale Coyne Racing in 2026.
- On September 3, the Cadillac Formula 1 Team announced that Colton Herta had been signed as the team's test driver for 2026, taking him out of IndyCar after seven seasons driving for Andretti Global.
- On September 3, Andretti Global confirmed reports that Will Power would join the team, driving the No. 26 entry vacated by Herta.
- On September 18, Team Penske announced that David Malukas would join the team on a multi-year deal beginning in 2026, driving the No. 12 entry vacated by Power.
- On September 23, Dale Coyne Racing confirmed reports that 2025 Indy NXT champion Dennis Hauger would join the team for the 2026 season.
- On October 14, Juncos Hollinger Racing announced that Rinus VeeKay would join the team for 2026, serving as the team's lead driver.
- On October 29, Marco Andretti announced his retirement from motor racing and the Indianapolis 500.
- On November 6, A. J. Foyt Enterprises announced it had signed 2025 Indy NXT runner-up Caio Collet for the 2026 season, replacing Malukas in the No. 4 car.
- On November 13, Arrow McLaren announced that Ryan Hunter-Reay would join the team for the 2026 Indianapolis 500. On April 26, Arrow McLaren announced that Hunter-Reay's entry would be fielded in partnership with Legacy Motor Club.
- On November 24, Rahal Letterman Lanigan Racing announced that World Endurance Championship and ex-Formula One driver Mick Schumacher would pilot the No. 47 car, replacing the No. 30 car driven by Devlin DeFrancesco.
- On February 13, 2026, Dale Coyne Racing announced that Romain Grosjean would be returning to the IndyCar Series after competing in the IMSA WeatherTech SportsCar Championship the previous year.

==== Midseason ====
- On April 27, 2026, A. J. Foyt Racing confirmed that Katherine Legge would race in the 2026 Indianapolis 500, driving the No. 11 car in partnership with HMD Motorsports.

=== Team changes ===
- On September 23, 2025, with the confirmation of Hauger, Dale Coyne Racing announced that it had formed a technical alliance with Andretti Global for the 2026 season.
- On January 29, 2026, Team Penske revealed that Tim Cindric would return to the team as the strategist for Scott McLaughlin, having been released from his role as the team's IndyCar president in May 2025 following penalties during qualifying for the Indianapolis 500.
- During the off-season, Ed Carpenter Racing shifted away from its former denomination and started to be publicly known by the acronym ECR, in light of further changes in its ownership structure involving Ted Gelov, who had become a co-owner in 2025.
- On February 25, 2026, it was confirmed via IndyCar's entry list and grid space allocations that PREMA Racing would miss at least the opening round at St. Petersburg, amidst reports of the founding Rosin family departing the organization and other financial challenges. The team would not enter any of the 2026 events.
- On April 20, 2026, Abel Motorsports confirmed that they would return to the series with an entry in the Indianapolis 500. The team had last competed in the IndyCar Series in 2023. Jacob Abel was the driver for the team.

== Schedule ==
The schedule was released on September 16, 2025. Start times were released on December 18, with all races being broadcast on Fox. The Freedom 250 was then added on January 30, 2026.

Icon	Legend
O	Oval/Speedway
R	Road course
S	Street circuit

Rd.	Date	Race name	Track	Location	Time (ET)
1	March 1	Firestone Grand Prix of St. Petersburg	S Streets of St. Petersburg	St. Petersburg, Florida	12:00 p.m.
2	March 7	Good Ranchers 250	O Phoenix Raceway	Avondale, Arizona	3:00 p.m.
3	March 15	Java House Grand Prix of Arlington	S Streets of Arlington	Arlington, Texas	12:30 p.m.
4	March 29	Children's of Alabama Indy Grand Prix	R Barber Motorsports Park	Birmingham, Alabama	1:00 p.m.
5	April 19	Acura Grand Prix of Long Beach	S Streets of Long Beach	Long Beach, California	5:30 p.m.
6	May 9	Sonsio Grand Prix	R Indianapolis Motor Speedway Road Course	Speedway, Indiana	4:30 p.m.
7	May 24	110th Running of the Indianapolis 500	O Indianapolis Motor Speedway	Speedway, Indiana	10:00 a.m.
8	May 31	Chevrolet Detroit Grand Prix	S Streets of Detroit	Detroit, Michigan	12:30 p.m.
9	June 7	Bommarito Automotive Group 500	O World Wide Technology Raceway	Madison, Illinois	9:00 p.m.
10	June 21	XPEL Grand Prix at Road America	R Road America	Elkhart Lake, Wisconsin	2:00 p.m.
11	July 5	Honda Indy 200 at Mid-Ohio	R Mid-Ohio Sports Car Course	Lexington, Ohio	12:30 p.m.
12	July 20 (Note: The race was originally scheduled on Sunday, July 19 at 5:30 p.m., before being postponed to Monday, July 20 at 3:00 p.m. due to excessive rainfall. The race was also shortened from 300 laps to 225 due to extreme heat conditions.)	Borchetta Bourbon Music City Grand Prix	O Nashville Superspeedway	Lebanon, Tennessee	3:00 p.m.
13	August 9	OnlyBulls Grand Prix of Portland	R Portland International Raceway	Portland, Oregon	4:00 p.m.
14	August 16	Ontario Honda Dealers Indy at Markham	S Streets of Markham	Markham, Ontario	12:00 p.m.
15	August 23	Freedom 250 Grand Prix of Washington, D.C.	S Streets of Washington	Washington, D.C.	11:30 a.m.
16	August 29–30	Snap-on Makers and Fixers 250	O Milwaukee Mile	West Allis, Wisconsin	2:30 p.m.
17	August 30	Snap-on Milwaukee Mile 250	O Milwaukee Mile	West Allis, Wisconsin	1:00 p.m.
18	September 6	Mission Foods Grand Prix of Monterey	R WeatherTech Raceway Laguna Seca	Monterey, California	2:30 p.m.

=== Schedule changes ===
- IndyCar returned to Phoenix Raceway after an eight-year absence, marking the championship's first race in Arizona since 2018.
- The Grand Prix of Arlington debuted in March, held at a new street circuit around the streets of Arlington, Texas. This marked the championship's return to Texas for the first time since 2023.
- The Grand Prix of Alabama moved from early May to late March.
- After having hosted the season finale since 2024, the Music City Grand Prix originally moved to July 19 but was rescheduled to July 20 due to excessive rainfall. It became round twelve of the season. The event was also scheduled to become a night race, also having its race length extended from 225 laps to 300 laps but due to extreme heat conditions, it was brought back down to 225 laps.
- The race at World Wide Technology Raceway also became a night race.
- The Ontario Honda Dealers Indy race moved from Exhibition Place, where it has been held ever since 1986, except for 2008, 2020, and 2021, to a temporary street circuit in Markham, Ontario under a five-year deal.
- The Milwaukee Mile race weekend became a double-header event, as it had been when it returned to the schedule in 2024.
- The Grand Prix of Monterey returned as the season finale, as it had been in 2019, 2022, and 2023. The race moved from late July to September 6.
- The Thermal Club IndyCar Grand Prix did not return in 2026 after two years on the calendar.
- Iowa Speedway was also dropped from the calendar after four years on the IndyCar schedule.
- The Freedom 250, a race held on the streets of Washington, D.C., debuted in August following its addition to the IndyCar schedule in January.

=== Sponsorship changes ===
- On November 20, Java House was announced as the title sponsor for the inaugural Grand Prix of Arlington.
- On December 3, Good Ranchers was unveiled as the title sponsor for IndyCar's return to Phoenix Raceway.
- OnlyBulls was announced as the title sponsor for the Grand Prix of Portland.
- Mission Foods was announced the sponsor for the IndyCar Monterey Grand Prix.

== Results ==
Rd.	Race	Pole position	Fastest lap	Most laps led	Race winner			Report
Rd.	Race	Pole position	Fastest lap	Most laps led	Driver	Team	Engine	Report
1	St. Petersburg	(New Zealand) Scott McLaughlin	(United States) Kyle Kirkwood	(Spain) Álex Palou	(Spain) Álex Palou	Chip Ganassi Racing	Honda	Report
2	Phoenix	(United States) David Malukas	(Australia) Will Power	(United States) David Malukas	(United States) Josef Newgarden	Team Penske	Chevrolet	Report
3	Arlington	(Sweden) Marcus Ericsson	(New Zealand) Scott Dixon	(United States) Kyle Kirkwood (Note: Kyle Kirkwood, Álex Palou and Will Power tied for most laps led at Arlington. Kirkwood received the bonus points for most laps led by virtue of being the highest-placed finisher, based on IndyCar rule 7.3.6.2.)	(United States) Kyle Kirkwood	Andretti Global	Honda	Report
4	Barber	(Spain) Álex Palou	(Denmark) Christian Lundgaard	(Spain) Álex Palou	(Spain) Álex Palou	Chip Ganassi Racing	Honda	Report
5	Long Beach	(Sweden) Felix Rosenqvist	(United States) Josef Newgarden	(Sweden) Felix Rosenqvist	(Spain) Álex Palou	Chip Ganassi Racing	Honda	Report
6	IMS GP	(Spain) Álex Palou	(Spain) Álex Palou	(United States) David Malukas	(Denmark) Christian Lundgaard	Arrow McLaren	Chevrolet	Report
7	Indianapolis 500	(Spain) Álex Palou	(United States) Conor Daly	(Spain) Álex Palou	(Sweden) Felix Rosenqvist	Meyer Shank Racing	Honda	Report
8	Detroit	(Spain) Álex Palou	(Spain) Álex Palou	(Spain) Álex Palou	(Spain) Álex Palou	Chip Ganassi Racing	Honda	Report
9	Gateway	(Spain) Álex Palou	(United States) Josef Newgarden	(Sweden) Marcus Ericsson	(United States) Josef Newgarden	Team Penske	Chevrolet	Report
10	Road America	(Spain) Álex Palou	(Denmark) Christian Lundgaard	(Sweden) Felix Rosenqvist	(Denmark) Christian Lundgaard	Arrow McLaren	Chevrolet	Report
11	Mid-Ohio	(Denmark) Christian Lundgaard	(United States) Josef Newgarden	(Mexico) Pato O'Ward	(Mexico) Pato O'Ward	Arrow McLaren	Chevrolet	Report
12	Nashville	(United States) Kyle Kirkwood	(New Zealand) Scott McLaughlin	(Spain) Álex Palou	(Spain) Álex Palou	Chip Ganassi Racing	Honda	Report
13	Portland	(Sweden) Felix Rosenqvist	(Sweden) Marcus Ericsson	(Spain) Álex Palou	(Spain) Álex Palou	Chip Ganassi Racing	Honda	Report
14	Markham	(United Kingdom) Louis Foster	(Sweden) Marcus Ericsson	(United Kingdom) Louis Foster	(Sweden) Marcus Ericsson	Andretti Global	Honda	Report
15	Washington, D.C.	(Spain) Álex Palou	(Australia) Will Power	(United States) Kyle Kirkwood	(United States) Kyle Kirkwood	Andretti Global	Honda	Report
16	Milwaukee 1	(New Zealand) Scott McLaughlin (Note: Scott McLaughlin, Álex Palou and David Malukas, the fastest three qualifiers, were assessed 9-place grid penalties for unapproved engine changes. Pato O'Ward, who qualified 4th, was the highest-placed driver not to have a penalty, and thus started the race from pole position. McLaughlin earned the pole award and the pole-winner's championship point.)	(Mexico) Pato O'Ward	(Mexico) Pato O'Ward	(Mexico) Pato O'Ward	Arrow McLaren	Chevrolet	Report
17	Milwaukee 2	(Spain) Álex Palou	(Spain) Álex Palou	(Spain) Álex Palou	(Mexico) Pato O'Ward	Arrow McLaren	Chevrolet	Report
18	Monterey	(New Zealand) Scott McLaughlin	(Netherlands) Rinus VeeKay	(New Zealand) Scott McLaughlin	(New Zealand) Scott McLaughlin	Team Penske	Chevrolet	Report

== Season report ==
=== Opening rounds ===
The 2026 IndyCar season started like the year before, with a pole position for Team Penske's Scott McLaughlin at the Firestone Grand Prix of St. Petersburg. He led Andretti's Marcus Ericsson throughout the first stint of the race, handling an early restart after a three-car collision caused by Juncos Hollinger Racing's Sting Ray Robb on the opening lap. McLaughlin pitted on lap 35, with Ericsson following a lap later. Chip Ganassi Racing's defending champion Álex Palou crucially elected to stay out two laps longer to attempt an overcut. That strategy worked and it led to Palou taking the net race lead after his stop on lap 38, before cycling back to the front on lap 42. The only threat to his victory from that point on came through the final stint, where Palou ran hard tires while the others behind ran the quicker soft tires, but Palou consistently pulled away throughout the final part to win the race by almost 13 seconds. Andretti's Kyle Kirkwood looked set to take second before both McLaughlin and McLaren's Christian Lundgaard overtook him on lap 94.

The Good Ranchers 250 marked IndyCar's return to Phoenix for the first time since 2018. Team Penske's David Malukas earned his first career pole position after beating teammate Josef Newgarden in qualifying. He controlled the opening part of the race, which saw an early caution on lap ten. On the restart, JHR's Rinus VeeKay made contact with Palou while attempting to pass him, sending the points leader into the wall and out of the race. Malukas held first place until the first pit cycle, where McLaren's Pato O'Ward took over in front. ECR's Christian Rasmussen rose up the order during the next stint, and a timely second caution allowed him to dispatch then-leader Kirkwood with fresher tires. Andretti's Will Power attacked Rasmussen for the lead and the pair made contact, causing a puncture for Power and a third caution. Newgarden was among the drivers electing to pit and quickly moved from tenth to the lead. He took the win and the points lead ahead of Kirkwood and Malukas, while Rasmussen dropped to fourteenth with a damaged car.

The Java House Grand Prix of Arlington brought a new track as well as a new top-six single-lap shootout qualifying format, in which Ericsson took his first career pole position. Palou qualified second, with the pair leading the field until they both pitted on lap 16. An error by Ericsson's pit crew saw him fall behind Palou, with O'Ward and Kirkwood slotting in behind. Lap 27 saw both Andretti cars make their second stops, with Palou and O'Ward following a lap later before Kirkwood got past Ericsson for a net second place. The pit stops promoted Power to the front, albeit on a less favorable two-stop strategy that saw him extend his second soft-tire stint until lap 45. By that point, Palou had nullified the gap to him and took over at the front. The top two took their final pit stop on lap 49, and Kirkwood, the fastest man on track at that point, reeled in Palou to claim first place with 16 laps to go. The race ended under caution after a multi-car collision, handing Kirkwood the win and with it the championship lead as Power rounded out the podium.

Round four, the Children's of Alabama Indy Grand Prix, saw Palou take pole position in qualifying ahead of Malukas and RLL's Graham Rahal. The top three remained static after the start until Rahal took second place on lap 17. Malukas pitted two laps later, with Rahal following suit and Palou holding out on hard tires on until lap 27. Lundgaard, who also started on hard tires, rose from tenth to third in his first stint. Palou took his second pitstop on lap 45, seven seconds ahead of Rahal, who stopped one lap later. Lundgaard pitted on lap 50, overcutting Rahal to move into second place. Lundgaard cut Palou's advantage to 3.4 seconds during the penultimate stint, until the Spaniard stopped for the final time on lap 64. Lundgaard stayed out longer again and looked set to challenge Palou through an overcut, but a slow 17-second stop saw him rejoin behind Rahal. Palou, now leading comfortably, took victory to cut the championship gap to two points. Lundgaard was able to repass Rahal, who held on to third to take his first podium since August 2023.

MSR's Felix Rosenqvist secured pole position in qualifying for the Acura Grand Prix of Long Beach, besting O'Ward by just 0.04 seconds. Palou started third and immediately passed O'Ward for second place on lap 2. Rosenqvist controlled the pace for the first 31 laps until the leaders made their first tandem pit stops. Rosenqvist maintained his lead over Palou as they both transitioned to the alternate tires. He managed to build a three-second lead during this second stint, before a piece of debris triggered the event's only caution period on lap 57. The field pitted on lap 59, leading to a direct duel between the top two drivers' pit crews. Palou's stop took 7.3 seconds, while Rosenqvist was stationary for 8.4 seconds, leading to him losing the lead as CGR's Scott Dixon took third place. After the lap 61 restart, Palou quickly began gapping the field, while Dixon had to work hard defending from Kirkwood. Palou claimed his maiden victory at Long Beach to also move back into the championship lead, 17 points ahead of fourth-place finisher Kirkwood.

Palou earned his third consecutive pole position for the Sonsio Grand Prix after leading every session of the event. The race began with a multi-car collision in turn 1 that collected Dixon, O'Ward, Rosenqvist and A. J. Foyt's Caio Collet. Palou and Kirkwood formed the top two during the early stages, until lap 21, when ECR's Alexander Rossi stopped on the front straight with a mechanical failure. Only a local yellow was initially thrown to allow most of the field to pit, a decision that led to criticism and a change in procedures post-race. Palou and Kirkwood stayed out and therefore dropped back when they pitted under the belated full-course yellow. Malukas inherited the lead and held it until lap 68, when Lundgaard made a decisive pass through turns 5 and 6 to claim first place. He maintained the lead to claim his second career victory and end a 47-race winless drought as Malukas took a career-best second place and Rahal completed the podium in third. Palou recovered to fifth to extend his championship lead over Kirkwood to 27 points.

=== Mid-season rounds ===
Pole position for the 110th Running of the Indianapolis 500 went to Palou once again, ahead of Rossi and Malukas. Palou and Dixon controlled the early stages, trading the lead to manage fuel consumption. Rain arrived at the speedway around the halfway point, forcing a red flag on lap 105. Upon the resumption, a distinct strategy split developed; Malukas and Palou opted for a late pit stop to run at full power, while Rosenqvist and O'Ward attempted to reach the finish by conserving fuel. The tactical battle was neutralized on lap 192 when a crash for Collet caused a red flag for cleanup. Rosenqvist led the subsequent restart, but was overtaken by teammate Marcus Armstrong before a final caution on lap 197 set up a one-lap shootout. Malukas took the lead into turn 1, with Rosenqvist and Armstrong side by side behind him until turn 4, where Rosenqvist slingshotted past Malukas to win by 0.0233 seconds, the closest margin in race history. Palou, seventh, grew his lead to 32 points despite being docked five points for a technical infringement.

Qualifying for the Chevrolet Detroit Grand Prix saw Palou continue his one-lap dominance as he claimed another pole position. At the green flag, Palou maintained his lead while McLaughlin overtook Power for second place. He returned to second following an early caution, before taking the lead on lap 17. He lost out to McLaughlin and Lundgaard when his tires faded on lap 35, before the frontrunners pitted and Palou returned to the front through an undercut. Palou's team then opted for a green-flag pit stop on lap 63, a move which would prove crucial when a caution was triggered three laps later, forcing Kirkwood, who had inherited the lead, to pit under yellow. That promoted Palou back into the lead and Rossi to second, before the latter had to take a drive-through penalty. Three more cautions punctured the final part of the race. Kirkwood pressured Palou at each restart, but was unable to find a way past. Palou maintained control to secure his fourth victory of the season, growing his championship lead over Kirkwood to 62 points.

The Bommarito Automotive Group 500 brought another pole position for Palou, who set a speed over a mile an hour faster than the rest of the field. He led the opening 30 laps, before Ericsson, who had started 12th, surged through the field to take the lead on lap 47. Two red-flag periods totaling 52 minutes due to rain punctured the race on laps 137 and 200. Following the second red flag, the race's primary contenders were split by strategy as Dixon and Palou attempted to save fuel to make one less stop. That gamble backfired; Dixon was forced to pit for emergency service while the pits were closed and Palou ran out of fuel right as he entered the pit lane and dropped down the order. On the final restart, Newgarden and Rasmussen engaged in a multi-lap duel, trading the lead four times before Newgarden secured the top spot on lap 221. Ericsson then moved past Rasmussen, but was not able to challenge for the lead in the final laps. With Palou finishing 17th, Kirkwood in sixth was able to trim Palou's championship lead to 49 points.

Palou continued his pole position streak at the XPEL Grand Prix at Road America, becoming only the fifth driver in series history to take five consecutive P1 starts. Malukas and Armstrong lined up behind him, before the latter immediately took second place at the start of the race. Palou held his lead and controlled the opening part of the race, briefly ceding the lead to Rosenqvist at the halfway point. A pitlane speeding penalty for Palou on lap 29 and a caution one lap later saw Armstrong emerge as the new leader ahead of Malukas and Rossi. Behind them, Lundgaard, who had dropped to last after lap-one contact with Dixon, climbed up the order on fresh tyres. He passed Malukas for second on lap 49 and closed on Armstrong, who was denied a maiden victory when his engine expired while leading on lap 52. That handed the lead to Lundgaard, who defended a late restart before completing his last-to-first run to take victory ahead of Malukas and Power. Palou recovered to fifth, now 60 points ahead of new second-placed driver Malukas.

Lundgaard was the driver to end Palou's qualifying streak by taking pole position for the Honda Indy 200 at Mid-Ohio ahead of teammate O'Ward. At the start of the 90-lap race, Lundgaard maintained his lead, while the field remained orderly through the opening stages. The McLaren pair remained at the front throughout the race, except for when they pitted, with Lundgaard keeping ahead of O'Ward until lap 42. There, Lundgaard drifted wide exiting turn 2, allowing O'Ward to pull alongside. Despite the two cars touching twice at the exit of turn 4, O'Ward utilized the preferred line into turn 5 to seize the lead. The race proceeded entirely caution-free, with O'Ward extending his stint before the final pit cycle to maintain his advantage. The Mexican was therefore able to claim his first win of the season and the tenth of his career, finishing 0.987 seconds ahead of Lundgaard to secure Arrow McLaren's first-ever 1-2 finish. Kirkwood finished third, allowing him to retake second in the standings, 56 points behind Palou, who finished the race in fifth.

Up next was the season's fourth oval race, the Borchetta Bourbon Music City Grand Prix, where Kirkwood claimed pole position ahead of Newgarden. The race, shortened for heat forecasts and then postponed to Monday due to rain, saw Kirkwood initially hold his lead, before the lead group pitted under caution on lap 19. McLaughlin overtook the leader on pit road and cycled back to the front on lap 61. A second caution fell on lap 122 for a collision between Dixon and Rossi; Palou pitted just before the yellow and inherited the lead once the front-runners made their delayed stops, moving ahead for good by lap 131. On their final stops, Newgarden, Rosenqvist and Malukas took on the soft alternate tire, while Palou stayed on the harder primary compound. A caution with 31 laps to go brought Newgarden and Malukas onto Palou's back, but he was able to keep both behind despite his harder tires. Palou's fifth win of the season saw him extend his championship lead to 83 points, with Malukas taking third to reclaim second in the standings.

=== Closing rounds ===
The OnlyBulls Grand Prix of Portland kicked off a five-race run over four consecutive weekends with Rosenqvist securing pole position ahead of Palou. At the start of the race, the field successfully navigated the opening chicane without major incident, and Rosenqvist maintained the lead for the first 30 laps. During the first round of pit stops, Palou stayed out longer than Rosenqvist and utilized an overcut strategy to overtake the Swede. Newgarden, who had pitted during an early caution, assumed the lead until he stopped on lap 37. That handed Palou the lead, and he used clean air to build a six-second lead. The next pit cycle began on lap 56, with Palou taking on hard tires and Rosenqvist electing to use soft tires. That tire advantage saw Rosenqvist close up to the leader, but he was unable to make a move before both made their final stops. During the following final stint, Rosenqvist came under threat from Power, who had fresh soft tires, but the top three remained static as Palou's sixth win of the year saw him amass a 110-point lead.

Unfinished track construction saw track action for the newly established Ontario Honda Dealers Indy at Markham delayed to Saturday. RLL's Louis Foster took the track's inaugural pole position in qualifying and led Lundgaard until a caution on lap 14 prompted the Dane to pit. Foster followed suit during a second caution on lap 33 and began working his way back up the order until he crashed and retired attempting to pass Ericsson for third on lap 43. DCR's Romain Grosjean, who had assumed the lead, was then able to pit under caution when Kirkwood suffered an identical crash on lap 53. That handed the lead to Ericsson, who built a 13-second gap before making his final stop on lap 69. Grosjean, now back in front, fended off Palou before Ericsson and Power closed in on the top two. After contact with Power and a pass on Palou, Ericsson overtook Grosjean for the lead with five laps remaining to secure his first victory for Andretti. Power was able to get past Palou for third as the Spaniard extended his championship lead to 142 points.

Palou claimed pole position by over half a second for the special one-off Freedom 250 Grand Prix of Washington, D.C., but lost his lead right after the start when Kirkwood overtook him into turn 3. Kirkwood led Palou until a multi-car collision on lap 36 allowed both to pit under caution. When exiting his pit stall, Palou hit equipment of the adjacent box and incurred a drive-through penalty. Rahal assumed the lead after electing not to stop under caution and held off the field on the restart before another collision ensued. The next restart happened on lap 50, after which Kirkwood quickly overtook those who stayed out to resume his lead. Palou suffered a loose wheel on his next pitstop, dropping a lap down, before he eventually spun and crashed on lap 123. The following restart saw McLaughlin attempt a move on Kirkwood that ended with McLaughlin crashing out. Kirkwood controlled the final restart, gapping Lundgaard and Power to secure his second victory of the season and cut Palou's championship lead to 91 points with three races left.

Rain delays across the Milwaukee weekend meant the first race run to completion was actually round 17, the Snap-on Milwaukee Mile 250. Palou started that race from pole position, and controlled the opening stint, briefly giving up the lead to Newgarden before retaking it on lap 46. During the second stint, VeeKay then rose into contention and took the lead on lap 100, before Palou once again moved back in front on lap 125. The pivotal moment came on lap 142 when Newgarden spun and hit the wall. The ensuing caution saw most of the field take on new tires, while McLaughlin elected to stay out. He kept a top-four position until his final stop on lap 192, but was beaten on pit road by O'Ward, who stopped on the same lap. Power and Lundgaard, the top two yet to pit, came in on lap 193, with a slow stop for Lundgaard and a speeding penalty for Power eliminating both from contention. O'Ward held off McLaughlin to win, with Kirkwood in sixth just able to keep the championship open as he sat 97 points behind Palou.

The Snap-on Makers and Fixers 250 was split into two parts, as rain forced organizers to halt the race after 90 laps before it was continued after the other Milwaukee race was already run. Polesitter O'Ward, who took that spot after penalties for McLaughlin, Malukas and Palou, also led the resumption after battling Newgarden and Rosenqvist through the first 90 laps. The Mexican stopped on lap 118, with others pitting among the same time, while Malukas extended his stint to lap 142. That allowed him to stay out when a caution came out on lap 151, and he cycled to the front. He gapped O'Ward, before the pair took their final stops on laps 194 and 195. Two cautions then erased Malukas' advantage, and O'Ward retook the lead on lap 226. Malukas pressured him throughout the final laps as VeeKay took the final podium spot off McLaughlin on lap 247. O'Ward held on to become the first driver to take two wins in a single day since Rick Mears in 1981, while a risk-averse drive to tenth place saw Palou claim his fifth championship title.

Pole position for the season-ending Mission Foods Grand Prix of Monterey went to McLaughlin ahead of Palou and Rosenqvist. He held the lead through an early caution period, while Kirkwood took third on the restart. Palou was the first frontrunner to take his pitstop on lap 19, with McLaughlin and Kirkwood following on lap 21. That first round of stops produced no change in the top three, but Palou elected to stay on soft tires as the lead pair switched to hard tires. McLaughlin and Kirkwood were able to extend their second stint up until lap 44, while Palou had to take an extra stop, erasing him from contention. The top two then pitted for the final time on lap 71, with Kirkwood switching back to soft tires and closing up to the leader. He did not attack him, leaving McLaughin to end the season with his eighth career IndyCar win and his first since September 2024. Not risking a battle with McLaughlin and taking second meant Kirkwood sealed the runner-up spot in the championship as Rossi took third, his first podium since June 2024.

== Points standings ==
- Ties were broken by number of wins, followed by number of 2nds, 3rds, etc.; then by finishing position in the previous race; then by random draw.

Position	1st	2nd	3rd	4th	5th	6th	7th	8th	9th	10th	11th	12th	13th	14th	15th	16th	17th	18th	19th	20th	21st	22nd	23rd	24th	25th+
Points	50	40	35	32	30	28	26	24	22	20	19	18	17	16	15	14	13	12	11	10	9	8	7	6	5

=== Driver standings ===
- At all races except the Indy 500, the pole position qualifier earned 1 point (unless qualifying is not held). The twelve Indy 500 qualifiers who qualified for the fast 12 session received points based on the results of that session, descending from 12 points for first place.
- Drivers who led at least one race lap were awarded 1 point. The driver who led the most laps during a race scored an additional 2 points.
- Each entrant-initiated engine change-out performed, prior to the engine having reached its distance mandate, resulted in a loss of ten championship points.

Pos	Driver	STP	PHX	ARL	BAR	LBH	IGP	INDY	DET	GTW	ROA	MOH	NSS	POR	MRK	D.C.	MIL		LAG	Pts
1	(Spain) Álex Palou	1^{L}*	24	2^{L}	**1**^{L}*	1^{L}	**5**^{L}	**7**^{1L}*	**1**^{L}*	**17**^{L}	**5**^{L}	5	1^{L}*	1^{L}*	4	**20**	10	**5**^{L}*	8	631
2	(United States) Kyle Kirkwood	4	2^{L}	1^{L}*	5	4	9	16	2^{L}	6	10	3	**10**^{L}	5	21	1^{L}*	15	6	2	545
3	(Denmark) Christian Lundgaard	3^{L}	13^{L}	7	2^{L}	20	1^{L}	17	5^{L}	10	1^{L}	**2**^{L}	16	9	6	2	6^{L}	3	6	535
4	(Mexico) Pato O'Ward	5	4^{L}	5	17	5	18	4^{6L}	4	11	12	1^{L}*	7	11	5	16	1^{L}*	1^{L}	11	522
5	(United States) David Malukas	13	**3**^{L}*	6	4	7	2^{L}*	2^{3L}	18	7	2	8	3^{L}	12	17	24	2^{L}	4	5	514
6	(New Zealand) Scott McLaughlin	**2**^{L}	8	11	16	6	16	3^{9L}	19	5	7	16	4^{L}	7	8	22^{L}	**4**	2^{L}	**1**^{L}*	483
7	(Sweden) Marcus Ericsson	6^{L}	17^{L}	**4**^{L}	9	25	22	13	8	2^{L}*	13	21	6	6	1^{L}	4	8	9	9	429
8	(United States) Josef Newgarden	7^{L}	1^{L}	15	10	14^{L}	4	28	10	1^{L}	22^{L}	9^{L}	2	8^{L}	13	8	7	25^{L}	15	423
9	(Sweden) Felix Rosenqvist	12	12	19^{L}	13	**2**^{L}*	23	1^{4L}	6^{L}	14	8^{L}*	13	5^{L}	**2**^{L}	24	19	17^{L}	20	4^{L}	412
10	(Netherlands) Rinus VeeKay	9	22	14	14	13	15	6^{11L}	12	4	18	4	12	4	7	23	3	7^{L}	16	378
11	(Australia) Will Power	22	16^{L}	3^{L}	12	19^{L}	13^{L}	29	22^{L}	8	3	6^{L}	20^{L}	3^{L}	3^{L}	3^{L}	25^{L}	14^{L}	13	368
12	(New Zealand) Scott Dixon	23^{L}	7^{L}	8	7	3	6	15^{10L}	24	12^{L}	11	17	18	14	18	7	18	15^{L}	17	331
13	(Cayman Islands) Kyffin Simpson	15	10	20	20	10	12	14^{7L}	9	21	4	15	9	10	14	5	16	19	10	327
14	(New Zealand) Marcus Armstrong	11	5^{L}	10	6	24	11	5^{L}	11^{L}	9	24^{L}	14	24	25	16	17	9	16	7^{L}	320
15	(United States) Alexander Rossi	16	6	9	11	9	25	30^{2L}	17	18	6	20	23	19	20	12	14	11	3^{L}	307
16	(United States) Graham Rahal	18	9	18	3^{L}	8	3	20	3	23	23	12	19	23	9	13^{L}	23	22	19	302
17	(United States) Santino Ferrucci	24	11	17	8	18	14	8^{5}	23	13	9	19	13	21	10	21	20	12	12	280
18	(United Kingdom) Louis Foster	14^{L}	23	13	25	16	7	21	7	20	14	18	17^{L}	15	**22**^{L}*	18	11	10	14	267
19	(France) Romain Grosjean	8	25	23	15	21	21	9^{L}	20	15	15	23	14	17	2^{L}	10	19^{L}	24	18	259
20	(United States) Nolan Siegel	20	20	24	18	12	10	11	15	24	21	10	11	18	12^{L}	6	13	17	24	259
21	(Denmark) Christian Rasmussen	19	14^{L}	25	19	15	24	27^{L}	25	3^{L}	25	7	22	24	23	14	5^{L}	8^{L}	21	245
22	(Norway) Dennis Hauger RY	10	15^{L}	16	23	11	8	19	13	25	20	25	21	13	15	15	21^{L}	21	25	228
23	(Germany) Mick Schumacher R	25	18	22	24	17	20	18	21	16	17	24	8	16	25	11	12	13	22	213
24	(Brazil) Caio Collet R	17	19	12	21	22	19	26^{L}	16	22^{L}	16	11	25	20	19	9	24	23	20	203
25	(United States) Sting Ray Robb	21	21	21	22	23	17	23	14	19	19	22	15	22	11	25	22	18	23	182
26	(United States) Conor Daly							12^{8L}												24
27	(Japan) Takuma Sato							10												20
28	(United Kingdom) Jack Harvey							22												8
29	(United States) Jacob Abel							24												6
30	(Brazil) Hélio Castroneves							25												5
31	(United States) Ed Carpenter							31												5
32	(United States) Ryan Hunter-Reay							32												5
33	(United Kingdom) Katherine Legge							33												5
Pos	Driver	STP	PHX	ARL	BAR	LBH	IGP	INDY	DET	GTW	ROA	MOH	NSS	POR	MRK	D.C.	MIL		LAG	Pts

Color	Result
Gold	Winner
Silver	2nd-place finish
Bronze	3rd-place finish
Green	Top 5 finish
Light Blue	Top 10 finish
Dark Blue	Other flagged position
Purple	Did not finish (DNF)
Red	Did not qualify (DNQ)
Brown	Withdrew (Wth)
Black	Disqualified (DSQ)
White	Did Not Start (DNS)
White	Race abandoned (C)
Blank	Did not participate

**In-line notation**
**Bold**	Pole position (1 point; except Indy)
Italics	Ran fastest race lap
^{L}	Led race lap (1 point)
*	Led most race laps (2 points)
^{1–12}	Indy 500 "Fast Twelve" bonus points
^{c}	Qualifying canceled (no bonus point)
RY	Rookie of the Year
R	Rookie

=== Entrant standings ===
Pos	Driver	STP	PHX	ARL	BAR	LBH	IGP	INDY	DET	GTW	ROA	MOH	NSS	POR	MRK	D.C.	MIL		LAG	Pts
1	#10 Chip Ganassi Racing	1^{L}*	24	2^{L}	**1**^{L}*	1^{L}	**5**^{L}	**7**^{1L}*	**1**^{L}*	**17**^{L}	**5**^{L}	5	1^{L}*	1^{L}*	4	**20**	10	**5**^{L}*	8	631
2	#27 Andretti Global	4	2^{L}	1^{L}*	5	4	9	16	2^{L}	6	10	3	**10**^{L}	5	21	1^{L}*	15	6	2	545
3	#7 Arrow McLaren	3^{L}	13^{L}	7	2^{L}	20	1^{L}	17	5^{L}	10	1^{L}	**2**^{L}	16	9	6	2	3	6^{L}	6	535
4	#5 Arrow McLaren	5	4^{L}	5	17	5	18	4^{6L}	4	11	12	1^{L}*	7	11	5	16	1^{L}*	1^{L}	11	522
5	#12 Team Penske	13	**3**^{L}*	6	4	7	2^{L}*	2^{3L}	18	7	2	8	3^{L}	12	17	24	2^{L}	4	5	514
6	#3 Team Penske	**2**^{L}	8	11	16	6	16	3^{9L}	19	5	7	16	4^{L}	7	8	22^{L}	**4**	2^{L}	**1**^{L}*	483
7	#28 Andretti Global	6^{L}	17^{L}	**4**^{L}	9	25	22	13	8	2^{L}*	13	21	6	6	1^{L}	4	8	9	9	429
8	#2 Team Penske	7^{L}	1^{L}	15	10	14^{L}	4	28	10	1^{L}	22^{L}	9^{L}	2	8^{L}	13	8	7	25^{L}	15	423
9	#60 Meyer Shank Racing	12	12	19^{L}	13	**2**^{L}*	23	1^{4L}	6^{L}	14	8^{L}*	13	5^{L}	**2**^{L}	24	19	17^{L}	20	4^{L}	412
10	#76 Juncos Hollinger Racing	9	22	14	14	13	15	6^{11L}	12	4	18	4	12	4	7	23	3	7^{L}	16	378
11	#26 Andretti Global	22	16^{L}	3^{L}	12	19^{L}	13^{L}	29	22^{L}	8	3	6^{L}	20^{L}	3^{L}	3^{L}	3^{L}	25^{L}	14^{L}	13	368
12	#9 Chip Ganassi Racing	23^{L}	7^{L}	8	7	3	6	15^{10L}	24	12^{L}	11	17	18	14	18	7	18	15^{L}	17	331
13	#8 Chip Ganassi Racing	15	10	20	20	10	12	14^{7L}	9	21	4	15	9	10	14	5	16	19	10	327
14	#66 Meyer Shank Racing	11	5^{L}	10	6	24	11	5^{L}	11^{L}	9	24^{L}	14	24	25	16	17	9	16	7^{L}	320
15	#20 ECR	16	6	9	11	9	25	30^{2L}	17	18	6	20	23	19	20	12	14	11	3^{L}	307
16	#15 Rahal Letterman Lanigan Racing	18	9	18	3^{L}	8	3	20	3	23	23	12	19	23	9	13^{L}	23	22	19	302
17	#14 A.J. Foyt Enterprises	24	11	17	8	18	14	8^{5}	23	13	9	19	13	21	10	21	20	12	12	280
18	#45 Rahal Letterman Lanigan Racing	14^{L}	23	13	25	16	7	21	7	20	14	18	17^{L}	15	**22**^{L}*	18	11	10	14	267
19	#18 Dale Coyne Racing	8	25	23	15	21	21	9^{L}	20	15	15	23	14	17	2^{L}	10	19^{L}	24	18	259
20	#6 Arrow McLaren	20	20	24	18	12	10	11	15	24	21	10	11	18	12^{L}	6	13	17	24	259
21	#21 ECR	19	14^{L}	25	19	15	24	27^{L}	25	3^{L}	25	7	22	24	23	14	5^{L}	8^{L}	21	245
22	#19 Dale Coyne Racing	10	15^{L}	16	23	11	8	19	13	25	20	25	21	13	15	15	21^{L}	21	25	228
Leaders' Circle cutoff
23	#47 Rahal Letterman Lanigan Racing	25	18	22	24	17	20	18	21	16	17	24	8	16	25	11	12	13	22	213
24	#4 A.J. Foyt Enterprises	17	19	12	21	22	19	26^{L}	16	22^{L}	16	11	25	20	19	9	24	23	20	203
25	#77 Juncos Hollinger Racing	21	21	21	22	23	17	23	14	19	19	22	15	22	11	25	22	18	23	182
Pos	Driver	STP	PHX	ARL	BAR	LBH	IGP	INDY	DET	GTW	ROA	MOH	NSS	POR	MRK	D.C.	MIL		LAG	Pts

=== Engine manufacturer standings ===
The top-two finishing full-season eligible entrants for a manufacturer in each race scored points toward the engine manufacturer's championship. Points scored were the same as the driver's championship except for bonus points – a race win was worth five bonus points for a manufacturer, while a pole position was worth one bonus point (except at the Indianapolis 500). A full-season entry was eligible to score manufacturer points until it exceeded the maximum number of allowed engines per entry.

For Indianapolis 500 qualifying, the manufacturer that ran the fastest speed on Saturday received one bonus point; while the manufacturer that qualified on pole position received two bonus points.

Pos	Manufacturer	STP	PHX	ARL	BAR	LBH	IGP	INDY	DET	GTW	ROA	MOH	NSS	POR	MRK	D.C.	MIL		LAG	Pts
1	(Japan) Honda	1	2	1	1	1	3	1	1	2	3	3	1	1	1	1	2	1	1	1571
1	(Japan) Honda	4	5	2	3	2	5	5	2	6	4	5	3	2	2	2	3	2	2	1571
1	(Japan) Honda	87^{W}	70	96^{PW}	91^{PW}	96^{PW}	66^{P}	138^{PW}	96^{PW}	69^{P}	68^{P}	65	91^{PW}	96^{PW}	96^{PW}	91^{P}	75	90	90	1571
2	(United States) Chevrolet	2	1	5	2	5	1	2	4	1	1	1	2	4	4	3	1	8	4	1216
2	(United States) Chevrolet	3	3	6	4	6	2	3	5	3	2	2	5	7	6	11				1216
2	(United States) Chevrolet	76^{P}	91^{PW}	58	72	58	95^{W}	75	62	90^{W}	95^{W}	96^{PW}	70	58	60	54	50	24	32	1216

^{P}–Pole position winner, ^{W}–Race winner

== See also ==
- 2026 Indy NXT
- 2026 USF Pro 2000 Championship
- 2026 USF2000 Championship
- 2026 USF Juniors
