= 2026 Honda Indy 200 =

IndyCar race held in Lexington, Ohio

(United States) 2026 Honda Indy 200
Race details
11th round of the 2026 IndyCar season
← Previous race	Next race →
- Layout of the Mid-Ohio Sports Car Course circuit
- Date: July 5, 2026
- Official name: Honda Indy 200
- Location: Mid-Ohio Sports Car Course, Lexington, Ohio
- Course: Permanent road course 2.258 mi / 3.634 km
- Distance: 90 laps 203.22 mi / 327.05 km

Pole position
- Driver: (Denmark) Christian Lundgaard (Arrow McLaren)
- Time: 1:04.8396

Fastest lap
- Driver: (United States) Josef Newgarden (Team Penske)
- Time: 1:06.5323 (on lap 54 of 90)

Podium
- First: (Mexico) Pato O'Ward (Arrow McLaren)
- Second: (Denmark) Christian Lundgaard (Arrow McLaren)
- Third: (United States) Kyle Kirkwood (Andretti Global)

Chronology
Previous	Next
2025	2027

The 2026 Honda Indy 200 was the eleventh round of the 2026 IndyCar season. The race was held on July 5, 2026, in Lexington, Ohio at the Mid-Ohio Sports Car Course. The race was contested of 90 laps. Pato O'Ward won the race. Christian Lundgaard finished 2nd, giving Arrow McLaren its first-ever 1-2 finish in IndyCar, and Kyle Kirkwood finished 3rd. Rinus VeeKay and Alex Palou rounded out the top five, and Will Power, Christian Rasmussen, David Malukas, Josef Newgarden, and Nolan Siegel rounded out the top ten.

== Race background ==
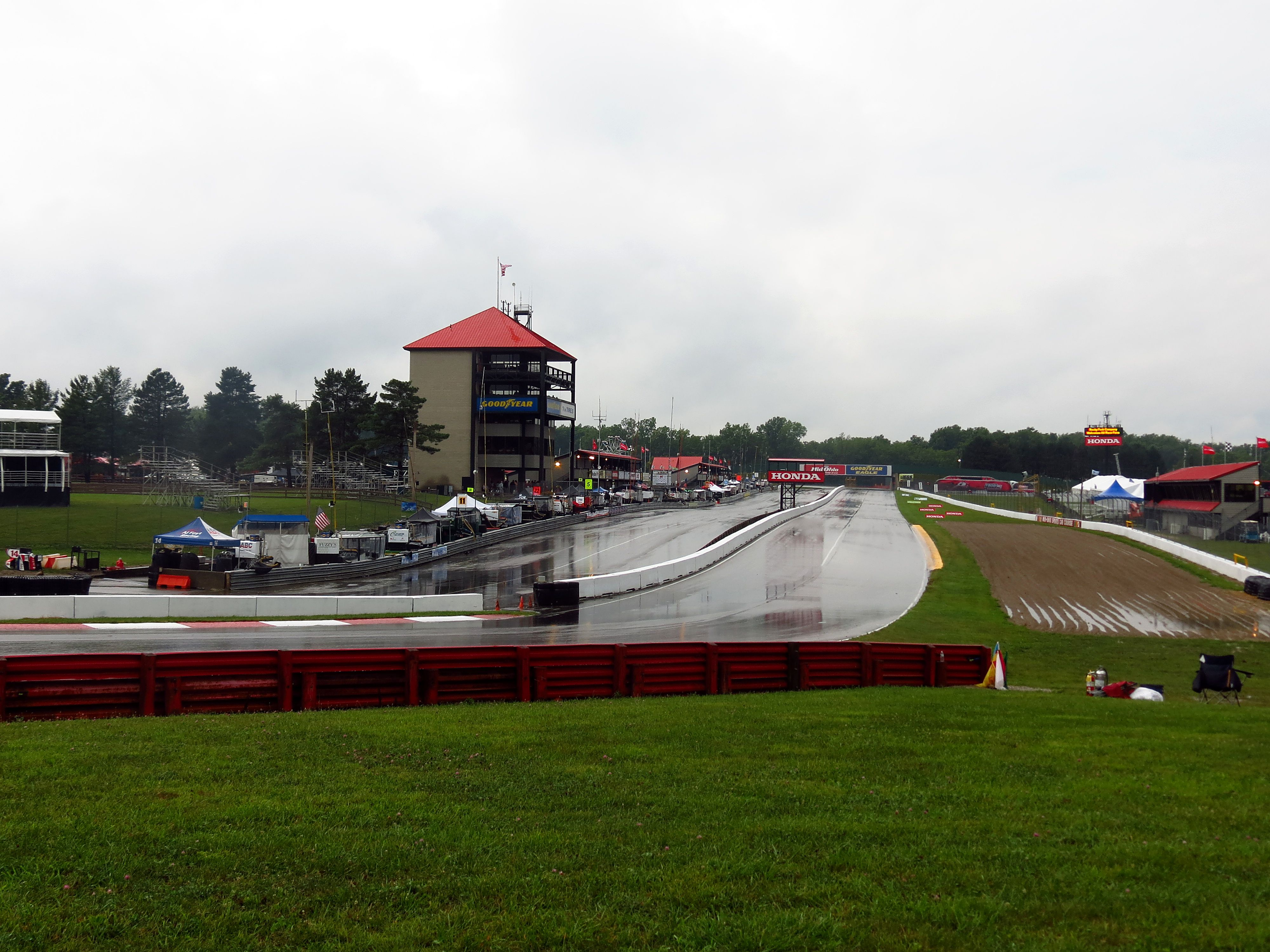
Mid-Ohio's start/finish and pit straight in preparations for the 2012 race, the track where the race was held.

The Honda Indy 200, is held at the Mid-Ohio Sports Car Course in Lexington, Ohio on its 13-turn road course layout. A 2.258-mile (3.63 km) track, it is the longest track on the calendar and is also currently a points-paying race of the NTT IndyCar Series. The event is contested by "Indy Car", that is a formula of professional-level, single-seat, open cockpit, open-wheel, purpose-built race cars.

== Entry list ==
Key	Meaning
R	Rookie
W	Past winner

No.	Driver	Team	Engine
2	(United States) Josef Newgarden W	Team Penske	Chevrolet
3	(New Zealand) Scott McLaughlin W	Team Penske	Chevrolet
4	(Brazil) Caio Collet R	A.J. Foyt Racing	Chevrolet
5	(Mexico) Pato O'Ward W	Arrow McLaren	Chevrolet
6	(United States) Nolan Siegel	Arrow McLaren	Chevrolet
7	(Denmark) Christian Lundgaard	Arrow McLaren	Chevrolet
8	(Cayman Islands) Kyffin Simpson	Chip Ganassi Racing	Honda
9	(New Zealand) Scott Dixon W	Chip Ganassi Racing	Honda
10	(Spain) Álex Palou W	Chip Ganassi Racing	Honda
12	(United States) David Malukas	Team Penske	Chevrolet
14	(United States) Santino Ferrucci	A. J. Foyt Racing	Chevrolet
15	(United States) Graham Rahal W	Rahal Letterman Lanigan Racing	Honda
18	(France) Romain Grosjean	Dale Coyne Racing	Honda
19	(Norway) Dennis Hauger R	Dale Coyne Racing	Honda
20	(United States) Alexander Rossi W	ECR	Chevrolet
21	(Denmark) Christian Rasmussen	ECR	Chevrolet
26	(Australia) Will Power W	Andretti Global	Honda
27	(United States) Kyle Kirkwood	Andretti Global with Curb-Agajanian	Honda
28	(Sweden) Marcus Ericsson	Andretti Global	Honda
45	(United Kingdom) Louis Foster	Rahal Letterman Lanigan Racing	Honda
47	(Germany) Mick Schumacher R	Rahal Letterman Lanigan Racing	Honda
60	(Sweden) Felix Rosenqvist	Meyer Shank Racing with Curb-Agajanian	Honda
66	(New Zealand) Marcus Armstrong	Meyer Shank Racing with Curb-Agajanian	Honda
76	(Netherlands) Rinus VeeKay	Juncos Hollinger Racing	Chevrolet
77	(United States) Sting Ray Robb	Juncos Hollinger Racing	Chevrolet

== Practice ==
=== Practice 1 ===
Top Practice Speeds
Pos	No.	Driver	Team	Engine	Lap Time
1	26	(Australia) Will Power W	Andretti Global	Honda	1:05.5540
2	27	(United States) Kyle Kirkwood	Andretti Global	Honda	1:05.6674
3	10	(Spain) Álex Palou W	Chip Ganassi Racing	Honda	1:05.7557
Official Results

=== Practice 2 ===
Top Practice Speeds
Pos	No.	Driver	Team	Engine	Lap Time
1	7	(Denmark) Christian Lundgaard	Arrow McLaren	Chevrolet	1:05.2158
2	45	(United Kingdom) Louis Foster	Rahal Letterman Lanigan Racing	Chevrolet	1:05.2896
3	27	(United States) Kyle Kirkwood	Andretti Global	Honda	1:05.3148
Official Results

== Qualifying ==
Qualifying was held at 2:30 PM EST on July 4, 2026.

=== Qualifying classification ===
Pos	No.	Driver	Team	Engine	Time	Final grid							
Pos	No.	Driver	Team	Engine	Time	Final grid	1	7	(Denmark) Christian Lundgaard	Arrow McLaren	Chevrolet	1:04.8396	1
Pos	No.	Driver	Team	Engine	2	Final grid	5	(Mexico) Pato O'Ward W	Arrow McLaren	Chevrolet	1:04.8649	2	
3	26	(Australia) Will Power W	Andretti Global	Honda	1:04.8778	3							
4	12	(United States) David Malukas	Team Penske	Chevrolet	1:04.9083	4							
5	21	(Denmark) Christian Rasmussen	ECR	Chevrolet	1:05.2169	5							
6	76	(Netherlands) Rinus VeeKay	Juncos Hollinger Racing	Chevrolet	1:05.4092	6							
7	28	(Sweden) Marcus Ericsson	Andretti Global	Honda	1:05.0312	7							
8	10	(Spain) Álex Palou W	Chip Ganassi Racing	Honda	1:05.0447	8							
9	2	(United States) Josef Newgarden W	Team Penske	Chevrolet	1:05.0533	9							
10	27	(United States) Kyle Kirkwood	Andretti Global	Honda	1:05.1060	10							
11	4	(Brazil) Caio Collet R	A.J. Foyt Enterprises	Chevrolet	1:05.1228	11							
12	15	(United States) Graham Rahal W	Rahal Letterman Lanigan Racing	Honda	1:05.4947	12							
13	60	(Sweden) Felix Rosenqvist	Meyer Shank Racing with Curb-Agajanian	Honda	1:05.3232	13							
14	77	(United States) Sting Ray Robb	Juncos Hollinger Racing	Chevrolet	1:05.1620	20							
15	6	(United States) Nolan Siegel	Arrow McLaren	Chevrolet	1:05.3344	14							
16	47	(Germany) Mick Schumacher R	Rahal Letterman Lanigan Racing	Honda	1:05.2084	15							
17	3	(New Zealand) Scott McLaughlin W	Team Penske	Chevrolet	1:05.4335	23							
18	20	(United States) Alexander Rossi W	ECR	Chevrolet	1:05.2188	16							
19	45	(United Kingdom) Louis Foster	Rahal Letterman Lanigan Racing	Honda	1:05.6035	17							
20	8	(Cayman Islands) Kyffin Simpson	Chip Ganassi Racing	Honda	1:05.2194	18							
21	18	(France) Romain Grosjean	Dale Coyne Racing	Honda	1:05.9843	19							
22	14	(United States) Santino Ferrucci	A.J. Foyt Enterprises	Chevrolet	1:05.2387	21							
23	9	(New Zealand) Scott Dixon W	Chip Ganassi Racing	Honda	1:07.7353	22							
24	66	(New Zealand) Marcus Armstrong	Meyer Shank Racing with Curb-Agajanian	Honda	1:05.2990	24							
25	19	(Norway) Dennis Hauger R	Dale Coyne Racing	Honda	1:05.9015	25							
Official Results

== Warmup ==
Top Practice Speeds
Pos	No.	Driver	Team	Engine	Lap Time
1	60	(Sweden) Felix Rosenqvist	Meyer Shank Racing	Honda	1:05.8725
2	27	(United States) Kyle Kirkwood	Andretti Global	Honda	1:06.1740
3	2	(United States) Josef Newgarden W	Team Penske	Chevrolet	1:06.2123
Official Report

== Race ==
The race was held at 12:30 PM EST on July 5, 2026.

=== Race classification ===
Pos	No.	Driver	Team	Engine	Laps	Time/Retired	Pit Stops	Grid	Laps Led	Pts.
1	5	(Mexico) Pato O'Ward W	Arrow McLaren	Chevrolet	90	1:43:23.5043	3	2	45	53
2	7	(Denmark) Christian Lundgaard	Arrow McLaren	Chevrolet	90	1:43:24.4920	3	1	41	42
3	27	(United States) Kyle Kirkwood	Andretti Global	Honda	90	1:43:25.7506	3	10	-	35
4	76	(Netherlands) Rinus VeeKay	Juncos Hollinger Racing	Chevrolet	90	1:43:26.2972	3	6	-	32
5	10	(Spain) Álex Palou W	Chip Ganassi Racing	Honda	90	1:43:31.0496	3	8	-	30
6	26	(Australia) Will Power W	Andretti Global	Honda	90	1:43:34.4615	3	3	2	29
7	21	(Denmark) Christian Rasmussen	ECR	Chevrolet	90	1:43:39.3450	3	5	-	26
8	12	(United States) David Malukas	Team Penske	Chevrolet	90	1:43:40.0147	3	4	-	24
9	2	(United States) Josef Newgarden W	Team Penske	Chevrolet	90	1:43:44.5711	3	9	2	23
10	6	(United States) Nolan Siegel	Arrow McLaren	Chevrolet	90	1:43:49.1301	3	14	-	20
11	4	(Brazil) Caio Collet R	A.J. Foyt Enterprises	Chevrolet	90	1:43:50.1131	3	11	-	19
12	15	(United States) Graham Rahal W	Rahal Letterman Lanigan Racing	Honda	90	1:43:54.2957	3	12	-	18
13	60	(Sweden) Felix Rosenqvist	Meyer Shank Racing with Curb-Agajanian	Honda	90	1:43:54.8600	3	13	-	17
14	66	(New Zealand) Marcus Armstrong	Meyer Shank Racing with Curb-Agajanian	Honda	90	1:43:59.8467	3	24	-	16
15	8	(Cayman Islands) Kyffin Simpson	Chip Ganassi Racing	Honda	90	1:44:00.5582	3	18	-	15
16	3	(New Zealand) Scott McLaughlin W	Team Penske	Chevrolet	90	1:44:03.3283	3	23	-	14
17	9	(New Zealand) Scott Dixon W	Chip Ganassi Racing	Honda	90	1:44:06.2785	3	22	-	13
18	45	(United Kingdom) Louis Foster	Rahal Letterman Lanigan Racing	Honda	90	1:44:14.6688	3	17	-	12
19	14	(United States) Santino Ferrucci	A.J. Foyt Enterprises	Chevrolet	90	1:44:20.1566	3	21	-	11
20	20	(United States) Alexander Rossi W	ECR	Chevrolet	90	1:44:23.9364	3	16	-	10
21	28	(Sweden) Marcus Ericsson	Andretti Global	Honda	90	1:44:24.5774	3	7	-	9
22	77	(United States) Sting Ray Robb	Juncos Hollinger Racing	Chevrolet	90	1:44:28.7150	3	20	-	8
23	18	(France) Romain Grosjean	Dale Coyne Racing	Honda	90	1:44:29.9332	3	19	-	7
24	47	(Germany) Mick Schumacher R	Rahal Letterman Lanigan Racing	Honda	90	1:44:30.9252	3	15	-	6
25	19	(Norway) Dennis Hauger R	Dale Coyne Racing	Honda	89	+1 Lap	3	25	-	5
Fastest lap: (United States) Josef Newgarden (Team Penske) – 1:06.5323 (Lap 54)
Official Results

== Championship standings after the race ==
Drivers' Championship standings

	Pos.	Driver	Points
Unchanged	1	(Spain) Álex Palou	404
Plus	2	(United States) Kyle Kirkwood	348 (-56)
Plus	3	(Denmark) Christian Lundgaard	339 (-65)
Minus	4	(United States) David Malukas	338 (-66)
Unchanged	5	(Mexico) Pato O'Ward	310 (-94)

Engine manufacturer standings

	Pos.	Manufacturer	Points
Unchanged	1	Honda	892
Unchanged	2	Chevrolet	868

- Note: Only the top five positions are included.

Previous race: 2026 XPEL Grand Prix at Road America	IndyCar Series; 2026 season	Next race: 2026 Borchetta Bourbon Music City Grand Prix
Previous race: 2025 Honda Indy 200	Honda Indy 200	Next race: 2027 Honda Indy 200
