= 2026 XPEL Grand Prix at Road America =

Indycar race held in Elkhart Lake, Wisconsin

(United States) 2026 XPEL Grand Prix at Road America
Race details
10th round of the 2026 IndyCar season
← Previous race	Next race →
- Layout of the Road America circuit
- Date: June 21, 2026
- Official name: XPEL Grand Prix at Road America
- Location: Road America, Elkhart Lake, Wisconsin
- Course: Permanent road course 4.014 mi / 6.460 km
- Distance: 55 laps 220.55 mi / 354.94 km

Pole position
- Driver: (Spain) Álex Palou (Chip Ganassi Racing)
- Time: 1:43.6615

Fastest lap
- Driver: (Denmark) Christian Lundgaard (Arrow McLaren)
- Time: 1:45.54 (on lap 50 of 55)

Podium
- First: (Denmark) Christian Lundgaard (Arrow McLaren)
- Second: (United States) David Malukas (Team Penske)
- Third: (Australia) Will Power (Andretti Global)

Chronology
Previous	Next
2025	2027

The 2026 XPEL Grand Prix at Road America was the tenth round of the 2026 IndyCar season. The race was held on June 21, 2026, in Elkhart Lake, Wisconsin at Road America. The race was contested to 55 laps. Christian Lundgaard won the race. David Malukas finished 2nd, and Will Power finished 3rd. Kyffin Simpson and Álex Palou rounded out the top five, and Alexander Rossi, Scott McLaughlin, Felix Rosenqvist, Santino Ferrucci, and Kyle Kirkwood rounded out the top ten.

== Race background ==
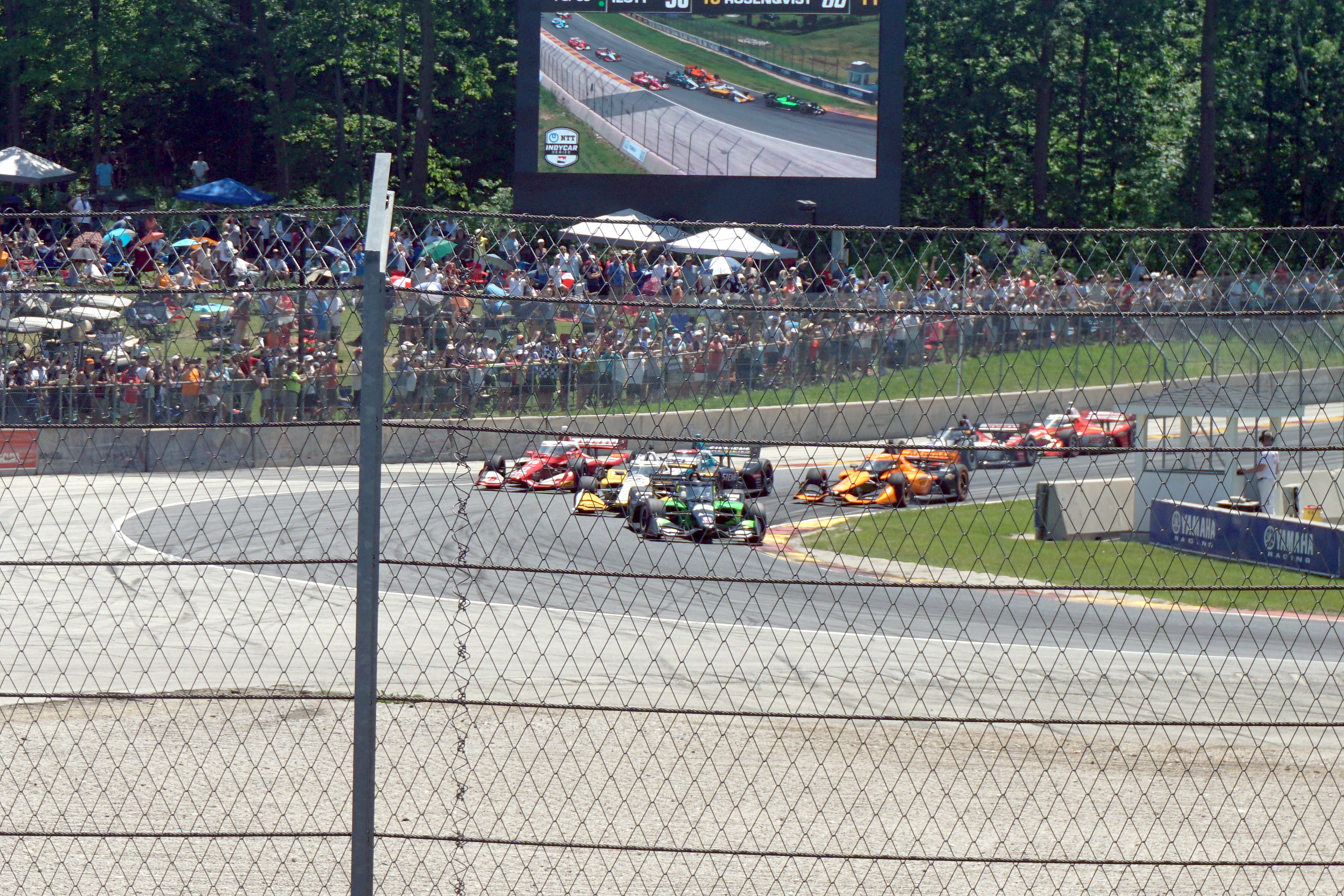
Road America, the track where the race was held.

The XPEL Grand Prix at Road America, is held at Road America in Elkhart Lake, Wisconsin on its 14-turn road course layout. A 4.014-mile (6.46 km) track, it is the longest track on the calendar and is also currently a points-paying race of the NTT IndyCar Series. The event is contested by "Indy Car", that is a formula of professional-level, single-seat, open cockpit, open-wheel, purpose-built race cars.

== Entry list ==
Key	Meaning
R	Rookie
W	Past winner

No.	Driver	Team	Engine
2	(United States) Josef Newgarden W	Team Penske	Chevrolet
3	(New Zealand) Scott McLaughlin	Team Penske	Chevrolet
4	(Brazil) Caio Collet R	A.J. Foyt Racing	Chevrolet
5	(Mexico) Pato O'Ward	Arrow McLaren	Chevrolet
6	(United States) Nolan Siegel	Arrow McLaren	Chevrolet
7	(Denmark) Christian Lundgaard	Arrow McLaren	Chevrolet
8	(Cayman Islands) Kyffin Simpson	Chip Ganassi Racing	Honda
9	(New Zealand) Scott Dixon W	Chip Ganassi Racing	Honda
10	(Spain) Álex Palou W	Chip Ganassi Racing	Honda
12	(United States) David Malukas	Team Penske	Chevrolet
14	(United States) Santino Ferrucci	A. J. Foyt Racing	Chevrolet
15	(United States) Graham Rahal	Rahal Letterman Lanigan Racing	Honda
18	(France) Romain Grosjean	Dale Coyne Racing	Honda
19	(Norway) Dennis Hauger R	Dale Coyne Racing	Honda
20	(United States) Alexander Rossi W	ECR	Chevrolet
21	(Denmark) Christian Rasmussen	ECR	Chevrolet
26	(Australia) Will Power W	Andretti Global	Honda
27	(United States) Kyle Kirkwood	Andretti Global with Curb-Agajanian	Honda
28	(Sweden) Marcus Ericsson	Andretti Global	Honda
45	(United Kingdom) Louis Foster	Rahal Letterman Lanigan Racing	Honda
47	(Germany) Mick Schumacher R	Rahal Letterman Lanigan Racing	Honda
60	(Sweden) Felix Rosenqvist W	Meyer Shank Racing with Curb-Agajanian	Honda
66	(New Zealand) Marcus Armstrong	Meyer Shank Racing with Curb-Agajanian	Honda
76	(Netherlands) Rinus VeeKay	Juncos Hollinger Racing	Chevrolet
77	(United States) Sting Ray Robb	Juncos Hollinger Racing	Chevrolet

== Practice ==
=== Practice 1 ===
Top Practice Speeds
Pos	No.	Driver	Team	Engine	Lap Time
1	66	(New Zealand) Marcus Armstrong	Meyer Shank Racing	Honda	1:44.2714
2	60	(Sweden) Felix Rosenqvist W	Meyer Shank Racing	Honda	1:44.3501
3	10	(Spain) Álex Palou W	Chip Ganassi Racing	Honda	1:44.3659
Practice 1 results

=== Practice 2 ===
Top Practice Speeds
Pos	No.	Driver	Team	Engine	Lap Time
1	5	(Mexico) Pato O'Ward	Arrow McLaren	Chevrolet	1:44.0029
2	66	(New Zealand) Marcus Armstrong	Meyer Shank Racing	Honda	1:44.1097
3	3	(New Zealand) Scott McLaughlin	Team Penske	Chevrolet	1:44.3108
Practice 2 results

== Qualifying ==
Qualifying was held at 1:00 PM CST on June 20, 2026.

=== Qualifying classification ===
Pos	No.	Driver	Team	Engine	Time	Final grid							
Pos	No.	Driver	Team	Engine	Time	Final grid	1	10	(Spain) Álex Palou W	Chip Ganassi Racing	Honda	1:43.6615	1
Pos	No.	Driver	Team	Engine	2	Final grid	12	(United States) David Malukas	Team Penske	Chevrolet	1:43.9542	2	
3	66	(New Zealand) Marcus Armstrong	Meyer Shank Racing with Curb Agajanian	Honda	1:44.0225	3							
4	60	(Sweden) Felix Rosenqvist W	Meyer Shank Racing	Honda	1:44.0502	4							
5	28	(Sweden) Marcus Ericsson	Andretti Global	Honda	1:44.1737	5							
6	3	(New Zealand) Scott McLaughlin	Team Penske	Chevrolet	1:44.8242	6							
7	14	(United States) Santino Ferrucci	A. J. Foyt Racing	Chevrolet	1:44.1270	13							
8	6	(United States) Nolan Siegel	Arrow McLaren	Chevrolet	1:44.2026	7							
9	4	(Brazil) Caio Collet R	A.J. Foyt Racing	Chevrolet	1:44.3713	8							
10	5	(Mexico) Pato O'Ward	Arrow McLaren	Chevrolet	1:44.4003	9							
11	26	(Australia) Will Power W	Andretti Global	Honda	1:44.4918	10							
12	9	(New Zealand) Scott Dixon W	Chip Ganassi Racing	Honda	1:44.5003	11							
13	7	(Denmark) Christian Lundgaard	Arrow McLaren	Chevrolet	1:44.2020	12							
14	18	(France) Romain Grosjean	Dale Coyne Racing	Honda	1:44.2824	14							
15	2	(United States) Josef Newgarden W	Team Penske	Chevrolet	1:44.3111	15							
16	21	(Denmark) Christian Rasmussen	ECR	Chevrolet	1:44.2850	16							
17	19	(Norway) Dennis Hauger R	Dale Coyne Racing	Honda	1:44.3717	17							
18	27	(United States) Kyle Kirkwood	Andretti Global	Honda	1:44.3002	18							
19	8	(Cayman Islands) Kyffin Simpson	Chip Ganassi Racing	Honda	1:44.4129	19							
20	15	(United States) Graham Rahal	Rahal Letterman Lanigan Racing	Honda	1:44.4601	20							
21	20	(United States) Alexander Rossi W	ECR	Chevrolet	1:44.4546	25							
22	76	(Netherlands) Rinus VeeKay	Juncos Hollinger Racing	Chevrolet	1:44.5392	21							
23	47	(Germany) Mick Schumacher R	Rahal Letterman Lanigan Racing	Honda	1:44.4556	22							
24	45	(United Kingdom) Louis Foster	Rahal Letterman Lanigan Racing	Chevrolet	1:44.7699	23							
25	77	(United States) Sting Ray Robb	Juncos Hollinger Racing	Chevrolet	1:45.5290	24							
Qualifying results

== Warmup ==
Top Practice Speeds
Pos	No.	Driver	Team	Engine	Lap Time
1	9	(New Zealand) Scott Dixon W	Chip Ganassi Racing	Honda	1:44.8508
2	66	(New Zealand) Marcus Armstrong	Meyer Shank Racing	Honda	1:44.9990
3	60	(Sweden) Felix Rosenqvist W	Meyer Shank Racing	Honda	1:45.0214
Official warmup results

== Race ==
The race was held at 1:00 PM CST on June 21, 2026.

=== Race classification ===
Pos	No.	Driver	Team	Engine	Laps	Time/Retired	Pit Stops	Grid	Laps Led	Pts.
1	7	(Denmark) Christian Lundgaard	Arrow McLaren	Chevrolet	55	1:51:06.4432	4	12	7	51
2	12	(United States) David Malukas	Team Penske	Chevrolet	55	1:51:07.0673	3	2	-	40
3	26	(Australia) Will Power W	Andretti Global	Honda	55	1:51:08.0000	3	10	-	35
4	8	(Cayman Islands) Kyffin Simpson	Chip Ganassi Racing	Honda	55	1:51:08.7529	3	19	-	32
5	10	(Spain) Álex Palou W	Chip Ganassi Racing	Honda	55	1:51:09.4111	3	1	13	32
6	20	(United States) Alexander Rossi W	ECR	Chevrolet	55	1:51:11.0257	3	25	-	28
7	3	(New Zealand) Scott McLaughlin	Team Penske	Chevrolet	55	1:51:11.0845	3	6	-	26
8	60	(Sweden) Felix Rosenqvist W	Meyer Shank Racing	Honda	55	1:51:11.8825	3	4	18	27
9	14	(United States) Santino Ferrucci	A. J. Foyt Racing	Chevrolet	55	1:51:13.8951	3	13	-	22
10	27	(United States) Kyle Kirkwood	Andretti Global	Honda	55	1:51:14.3013	3	18	-	20
11	9	(New Zealand) Scott Dixon W	Chip Ganassi Racing	Honda	55	1:51:14.7991	3	11	-	19
12	5	(Mexico) Pato O'Ward	Arrow McLaren	Chevrolet	55	1:51:15.5344	3	9	-	18
13	28	(Sweden) Marcus Ericsson	Andretti Global	Honda	55	1:51:16.4624	3	5	-	17
14	45	(United Kingdom) Louis Foster	Rahal Letterman Lanigan Racing	Chevrolet	55	1:51:17.2621	3	23	-	16
15	18	(France) Romain Grosjean	Dale Coyne Racing	Honda	55	1:51:18.1015	3	14	-	15
16	4	(Brazil) Caio Collet R	A.J. Foyt Racing	Chevrolet	55	1:51:18.5638	4	8	-	14
17	47	(Germany) Mick Schumacher R	Rahal Letterman Lanigan Racing	Honda	55	1:51:18.7956	4	22	-	13
18	76	(Netherlands) Rinus VeeKay	Juncos Hollinger Racing	Chevrolet	55	1:51:19.5841	3	21	-	12
19	77	(United States) Sting Ray Robb	Juncos Hollinger Racing	Chevrolet	55	1:51:20.1935	3	24	-	11
20	19	(Norway) Dennis Hauger R	Dale Coyne Racing	Honda	55	1:51:21.1097	4	17	-	10
21	6	(United States) Nolan Siegel	Arrow McLaren	Chevrolet	55	1:51:26.2500	3	7	-	9
22	2	(United States) Josef Newgarden W	Team Penske	Chevrolet	55	1:51:43.2189	3	15	3	9
23	15	(United States) Graham Rahal	Rahal Letterman Lanigan Racing	Honda	54	Contact	3	20	-	7
24	66	(New Zealand) Marcus Armstrong	Meyer Shank Racing with Curb Agajanian	Honda	52	Mechanical	3	3	14	7
25	21	(Denmark) Christian Rasmussen	ECR	Chevrolet	28	Mechanical	2	16	-	5
Fastest lap: (Denmark) Christian Lundgaard (Lap 50)
Official race results

== Championship standings after the race ==
Drivers' Championship standings

	Pos.	Driver	Points
Unchanged	1	(Spain) Álex Palou	374
1	2	(United States) David Malukas	314
1	3	(United States) Kyle Kirkwood	313
Unchanged	4	(Denmark) Christian Lundgaard	297
Unchanged	5	(Mexico) Pato O'Ward	257

Engine manufacturer standings

	Pos.	Manufacturer	Points
Unchanged	1	Honda	827
Unchanged	2	Chevrolet	772

- Note: Only the top five positions are included.

Previous race: 2026 Bommarito Automotive Group 500	IndyCar Series; 2026 season	Next race: 2026 Honda Indy 200
Previous race: 2025 XPEL Grand Prix at Road America	XPEL Grand Prix at Road America	Next race: 2027 XPEL Grand Prix at Road America
