= Honda Indy V6 =

Honda Indy V6 engine

Overview
- Manufacturer: (United States) Honda Racing Corporation USA
- Production: 2012–present

Layout
- Configuration: V6, 90° cylinder angle
- Displacement: 2.2 L (2,199 cc)
- Cylinder bore: 95 mm (3.7 in)
- Piston stroke: 51.7 mm (2 in)
- Cylinder block material: Aluminum alloy
- Cylinder head material: Aluminum alloy
- Valvetrain: 24-valve, DOHC, four-valves per cylinder

Combustion
- Turbocharger: Twin-turbocharged
- Fuel system: Direct-indirect fuel-injection combination
- Management: MES TAG-400i
- Fuel type: E85 Ethanol provided by Sunoco (2012–2018) and Speedway (2019–2022); E100 Renewable Ethanol provided by Shell V-Power Nitro+ (2023–present)
- Oil system: Dry sump

Output
- Power output: 550-735 hp (410-548 kW) @ 10,500-12,200 rpm (depending on variable turbo boost used at track)
- Torque output: Approx. 410–502 N⋅m (302–370 ft⋅lbf) @ 8000 rpm

Dimensions
- Dry weight: 248–250 lb (112–113 kg) excluding clutch, ECU, fluids, turbocharger

Chronology
- Predecessor: Honda Indy V8 (2003–2011)

The Honda Indy V6, officially called the Honda HI12TT/R, is a 2.2-liter, twin-turbocharged V6 racing engine, developed and produced by Honda Racing Corporation USA, which has been used in the IndyCar Series since 2012.

== Specifications ==
- Engine type: Honda V6 - twin-turbocharged
- Capacity: 2,200 cc (134 cu in)
- HP rating: 550–735 hp (410–548 kW) (depending on turbo boost pressure used at track)
- Max. RPM/Rev limiter: 12,000 rpm; 12,200 rpm (overtake; push-to-pass)
- Weight: 248–250 lb (112–113 kg)
- Oil system: Dry-sump lubrication
- Turbocharger: Twin - BorgWarner EFR7163
- Turbocharger Boost Limits as of 2026 (Oval except Milwaukee / Indy 500 Qualifying, Milwaukee, Road/Street Course / Road/Street Overtake): 1.3 bar (19 psi) / 1.5 bar (22 psi) / 1.65 bar (24 psi)
- Camshafts: Double-overhead camshafts
- Valve actuation: Finger-follower
- Valve springs: Wire-type
- Cylinder head: 4 valves (titanium) per cylinder
- Fuel injection: Keihin 6x direct in-cylinder fuel. Keihin 6x high pressure port injectors
- Fuel: E85 Ethanol provided by Sunoco (2012–2018) and Speedway (2019–2022), E100 Renewable Ethanol provided by Shell V-Power Nitro+ (2023–present)
- Block & head material: Aluminum
- Crankshaft: Billet steel
- Con rods: Billet steel
- Pistons: Billet aluminum
- Intake systems: Single plenum - carbon-fiber
- Throttle systems: Electronic throttle control
- Electronic control unit: McLaren Electronics - TAG-400I
- Engine service life: 2,500–2,850 miles
- Gearbox: Sequential gearbox, paddle-shift

=== Applications ===
- Dallara DW12
