= Tim Cindric =

American motorsports executive

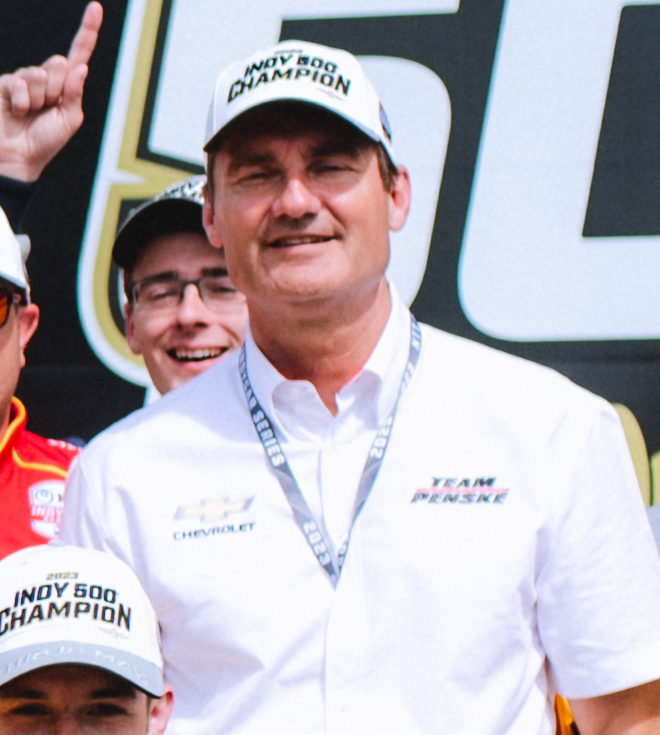
- Cindric at the 2023 Indianapolis 500
- Born: April 20, 1968 (age 58); Indianapolis, Indiana, U.S.
- Education: Rose-Hulman Institute of Technology
- Occupation: Crew chief
- Known for: Former president of Team Penske
- Relatives: Austin Cindric (son), Tanner Cindric (son)

Timothy J. Cindric (born April 20, 1968) is an American motorsports executive who was the President of Team Penske. He is the father of NASCAR Xfinity Series champion and NASCAR Cup Series race winner Austin Cindric.

== Biography ==
A native of Indianapolis, Cindric is an alumnus of Rose-Hulman Institute of Technology, where he was a four-year basketball letterman in 1990.

Cindric served as the Team Manager for Team Rahal from 1994 to 1999, before joining Penske in October 1999. He was promoted to the position of president at Penske Racing in January 2006. He also served as strategist for the Penske-owned IndyCar teams of Will Power (through 2016) and Josef Newgarden (from 2017). His teams won the IndyCar championship for the 2014, 2017 and 2019 seasons. He was fired from the team in May 2025, three days after Will Power and Josef Newgarden's cars failed technical inspection for having a modified part during the Firestone Fast 12 in qualifying for the 2025 Indianapolis 500.

In January 2026, Team Penske announced Cindric as strategist for IndyCar driver Scott McLaughlin.

Cindric's son Austin won the 2022 Daytona 500 and previously raced in the Continental Tire Sports Car Challenge and Pirelli World Challenge, ARCA, and several NASCAR racing series. Austin currently races in the NASCAR Cup Series full-time for Team Penske, and was one of 5 drivers (along with Brad Keselowski, Joey Logano, Ryan Blaney and Sam Hornish Jr.) to help Team Penske win the Xfinity Series Owner's Championship in 2017. In addition, Austin drove for Penske driver Keselowski's Brad Keselowski Racing full-time in the Camping World Truck Series in 2017.
