= 2025 Indianapolis 500 =

American motor race

109th Indianapolis 500

Indianapolis Motor Speedway

Indianapolis 500
- Sanctioning body: IndyCar
- Season: 2025 IndyCar season
- Date: May 25, 2025
- Winner: (Spain) Álex Palou
- Winning team: Chip Ganassi Racing
- Winning Chief Mechanic: Ricky Davis
- Time of race: 2:57:38.2965
- Average speed: 168.883 mph (271.791 km/h)
- Pole position: (Israel) Robert Shwartzman
- Pole speed: 232.790 mph (374.639 km/h)
- Fastest qualifier: Robert Shwartzman
- Rookie of the Year: (Israel) Robert Shwartzman
- Most laps led: (Japan) Takuma Sato (51)
- Fastest Lap: (Brazil) Hélio Castroneves (39.791 seconds)

Pre-race ceremonies
- National anthem: Natalie Grant
- "Back Home Again in Indiana": Jim Cornelison
- Starting command: Roger Penske
- Pace car: Chevrolet Corvette ZR1
- Pace car driver: Michael Strahan
- Two-seater: Jimmie Johnson (driver); Tom Brady (passenger)
- Starter: Aaron Likens
- Honorary starter: Casey Foyt
- Estimated attendance: 350,000

Television in the United States
- Network: Fox
- Announcers: Will Buxton, James Hinchcliffe, Townsend Bell
- Nielsen ratings: 7.05 million

Chronology
| Previous | Next |
|---|---|
| 2024 | 2026 |

The 2025 Indianapolis 500 (branded as the 109th Running of the Indianapolis 500 presented by Gainbridge for sponsorship reasons) was an IndyCar Series race that was held on Sunday, May 25, 2025, at the Indianapolis Motor Speedway in Speedway, Indiana. The race was round six of the 2025 NTT IndyCar Series season, and was televised on Fox for the first time in its history. The 2025 race marked the first year of hybrid energy recovery system powertrains at Indianapolis.

The month of May activities formally began with the Sonsio Grand Prix on the combined road course. Practice officially began on Tuesday, May 13, and Time Trials were held on May 17–18. Carb Day, the traditional final day of practice, along with the Pit Stop Challenge, took place on May 23. Rookie driver Robert Shwartzman of Prema Racing qualified for the pole position, the first rookie pole winner since Teo Fabi in 1983. (Note: Rookie driver Tony Stewart qualified second for the 1996 Indianapolis 500 but was elevated to the pole position on race day after pole winner Scott Brayton was fatally injured in a crash during a practice session on May 17.)

Three-time series champion Álex Palou of Chip Ganassi Racing won the race, his first Indianapolis 500 victory and first oval-track victory in IndyCar. It marked Ganassi's 6th Indy 500 victory, tied for second most all-time. It was Palou's sixth start at Indy, his best previous finish was a second in 2021. Palou took the lead on lap 187, and held off 2022 winner Marcus Ericsson of Andretti Global. Second place Ericsson, his teammate Kyle Kirkwood (6th), and Callum Ilott (12th) all failed post-race technical inspection, and were moved to the back of the field when official results were posted. Consequently, David Malukas was elevated to second place and Pato O'Ward to third. Palou's win highlighted a dominating season in which he won eight races and became the first driver to win the Indianapolis 500 and the IndyCar championship in the same season since Dario Franchitti in 2010.

Josef Newgarden, the race winner in 2023–2024, failed to accomplish the first Indianapolis 500 three-peat. Newgarden and Penske teammate Will Power were moved to the back of the starting grid due to technical infractions during qualifying. All three cars of the Penske team had disappointing results, the team's worst overall performance at Indy since failing to qualify in 1995. Power finished a lap down in 16th, Newgarden dropped out with mechanical failure, and Scott McLaughlin crashed out on the pace lap (after also crashing heavily during practice). Statistically, it was the team's worst combined three-car result at Indy since 1992.

Kyle Larson made his second attempt at "Double Duty" after failing in 2024, as that year's Coca-Cola 600 was called for rain. He crashed out at Indianapolis on lap 92. Larson would lead 34 laps early on at Charlotte, but dropped out after a crash. At season's end, Larson won the 2025 Cup Series Championship – the first time in history that a driver raced in the "500" and won the NASCAR championship in the same calendar year. Polesitter Robert Shwartzman led 8 laps, but dropped out on lap 87 after skidding into the wall entering the pits. He still was voted rookie of the year. Two-time winner Takuma Sato led the most laps, but lost the lead when he overshot his pit stall. He battled back to place 9th.

== Race background ==
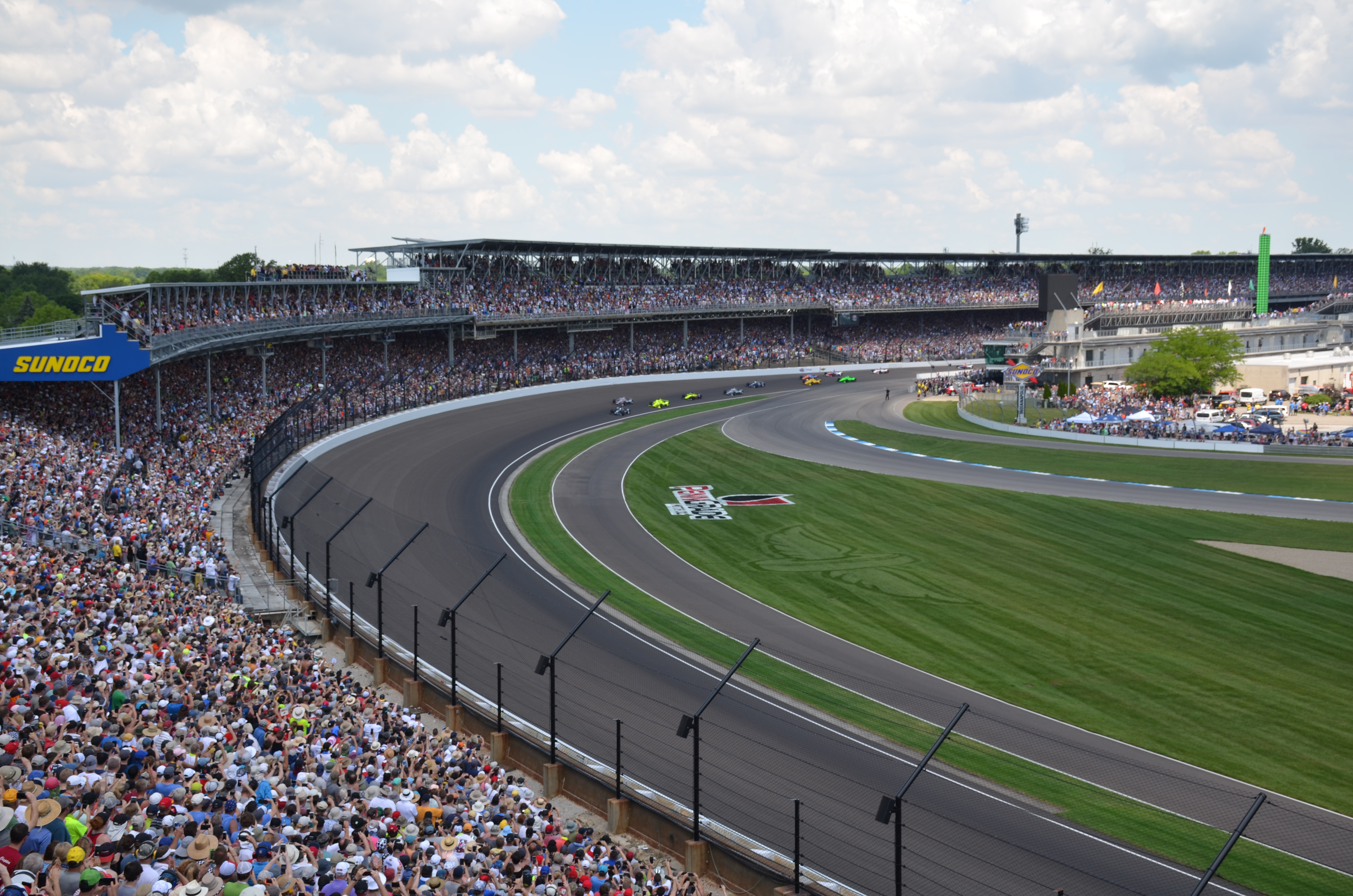
Turn one at the Indianapolis Motor Speedway (pictured in 2018).

The Indianapolis 500, commonly called the Indy 500, is held at the Indianapolis Motor Speedway, a 2.5-mile (4.02 km) paved oval. First held in 1911, it is currently a points-paying race of the NTT IndyCar Series. The event is contested by "Indy cars", a formula of professional-level, single-seat, open cockpit, open-wheel, purpose-built race cars. The race is the most prestigious event of the IndyCar calendar, and one of the oldest and most important automobile races in the world. The race traditionally has a field of 33 cars.

=== Rule changes ===
- IndyCar Series officials clarified the procedure for utilizing replacement drivers on race day. This was largely in response to the situation involving Kyle Larson at Arrow McLaren, who was scheduled to attempt Double Duty for the second time. If a team declares a replacement driver, that driver must pass a refresher test in the same entry, with minimal setup changes allowed. If the replacement driver is used on race day, the car will be moved to the rear of the starting grid (33rd). The only driver to take part in the refresher course was 2013 Indianapolis 500 champion Tony Kanaan.
- Each entry was permitted 32 sets of tires for the entirety of the event, plus 8 additional sets for use during the Open Test.

=== Event logistics ===
For the 2025 Indianapolis 500, Indianapolis Motor Speedway reported that in addition to its core year-round staff of 200–250 employees, approximately 12,500 additional personnel were present at the facility during the race weekend to support broadcast operations, safety and medical services, security, retail, weather monitoring, and other logistical functions.

=== Sponsorship ===
On May 25, 2022, it was announced that online financial services company Gainbridge reached a multiyear agreement to extend their presenting sponsorship of the Indianapolis 500. The extension was for an undisclosed length. This will be the third year under the current deal. Gainbridge originally signed a four-year deal which was in place from 2019 to 2022.

=== 2025 IndyCar Series ===
The 2025 Indianapolis 500 was the sixth race of the 2025 NTT IndyCar Series season. Álex Palou won four of the first five races of the season, including St. Petersburg, Thermal Club, Alabama, and the Sonsio Grand Prix. The only race Palou did not win was Long Beach, which was won by Kyle Kirkwood (Palou finished second in that race). Palou held a commanding 97-point margin over Kirkwood in the championship points standings going into the Indianapolis 500.

==== Points standings (top 5) entering Indianapolis 500 ====
| Pos | Driver | Pts |
|---|---|---|
| 1 | (Spain) Álex Palou | 248 |
| 2 | (United States) Kyle Kirkwood | 151 |
| 3 | (Denmark) Christian Lundgaard | 150 |
| 4 | (Mexico) Pato O'Ward | 148 |
| 5 | (New Zealand) Scott McLaughlin | 137 |

== Race schedules ==
Race schedule—April 2025
| Sun | Mon | Tue | Wed | Thu | Fri | Sat |
|---|---|---|---|---|---|---|
| 20 | 21 | 22 | 23; Open test | 24; Open test | 25 | 26 |
Race schedule—May 2025
| | | | | 1 | 2 | 3 Mini-Marathon |
| 4 | 5 | 6 | 7 | 8 USF Pro testing | 9 USF, NXT Race; IndyCar Qual. | 10; Sonsio G.P. (USF, NXT, NICS) |
| 11 | 12 | 13; Practice | 14; Practice | 15; Practice | 16; Fast Friday | 17; Time Trials (13–30) |
| 18; Time Trials (1–12, 31–33) | 19; Practice | 20 | 21 | 22 | 23; Carb Day (IMS); Hoosier Hundred, USF/USF Pro Race (IRP) | 24; Parade |
| 25; Indianapolis 500 | 26; Memorial Day | 27 | 28 | 29 | 30 | 31 |

| Color | Notes |
|---|---|
| Green | Practice |
| Blue | Time trials |
| Silver | Race day |
| Red | Rained out* |
| Blank | No track activity |

* Includes days where track
activity was significantly limited due to rain

== Entry list ==
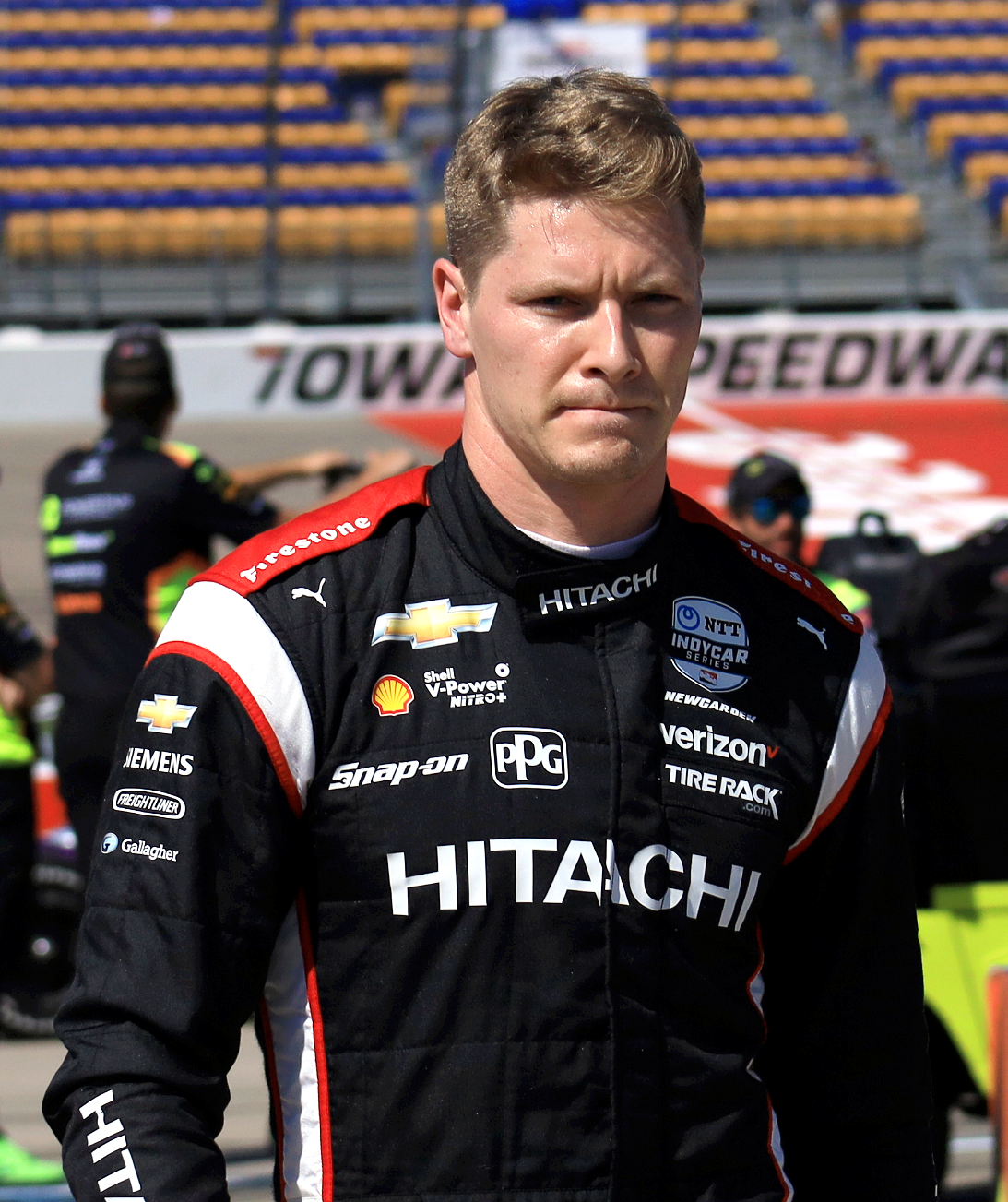
Josef Newgarden (pictured in 2022) entered as the two-time defending winner, having won in both 2023 and 2024

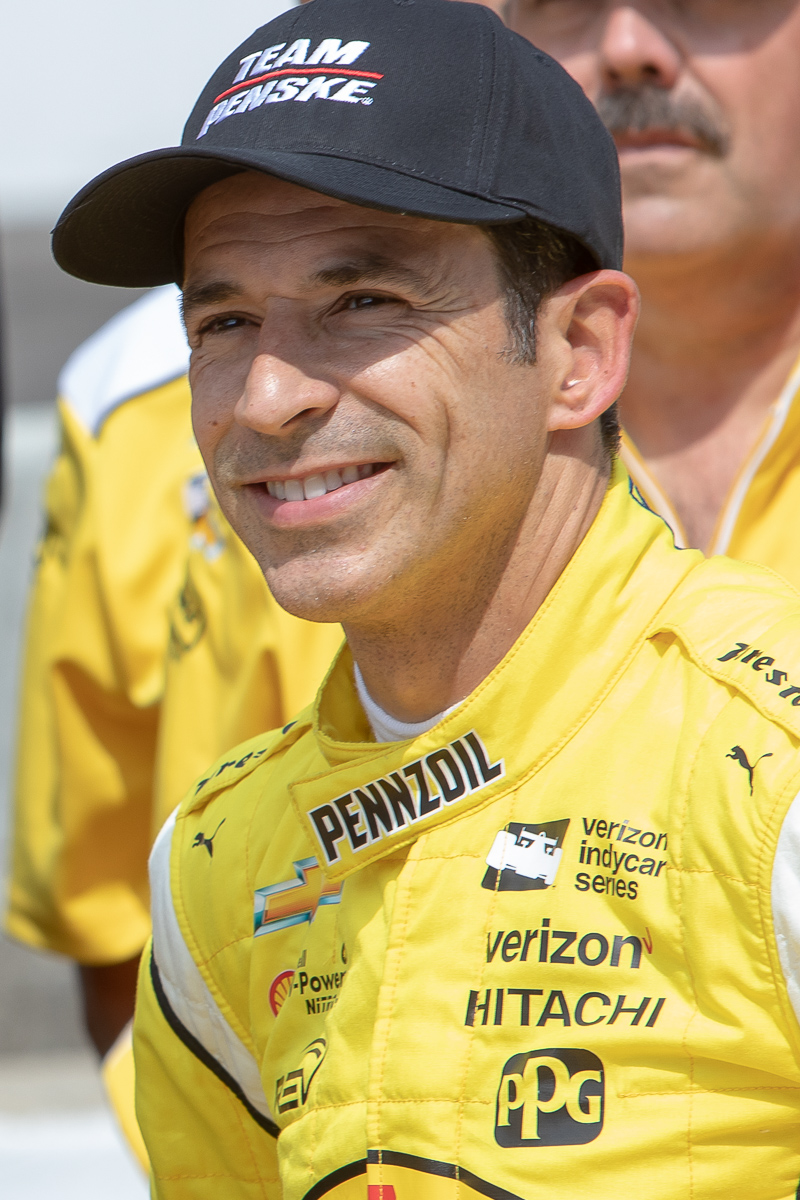
Four-time race winner Hélio Castroneves (pictured in 2018) has the most previous starts in the field with 24.

All entries used a spec Dallara DW12 chassis utilizing the Universal Aero Kit with the aeroscreen. Honda (HRC) and Chevrolet (Ilmor) were the engine providers. Firestone was the exclusive tire supplier. There were 34 confirmed entries, including eight former winners and four race rookies. With the confirmation of Takuma Sato's Honda entry, bumping was confirmed. Abel Motorsports declined to enter, instead electing to provide technical support and a back-up car for Jacob Abel's entry at Dale Coyne Racing. Katherine Legge, the lone female driver in the race in 2023–2024, confirmed on April 10 that she would not enter the 2025 race, instead announcing her intent to compete in multiple NASCAR races including the BetMGM 300 race during the Memorial Day Coca-Cola 600 weekend at Charlotte.

Kyle Larson, the 2024 rookie of the year, attempted Double Duty for the second time. Retired veteran driver and Arrow McLaren team principal Tony Kanaan (the 2013 winner) was to serve as Larson's replacement driver if needed. Four-time winner Hélio Castroneves made his milestone 25th career start, just the fourth driver to do so (joining A. J. Foyt, Mario Andretti, and Al Unser). Two-time defending race winner Josef Newgarden (2023–2024) attempted to become the first driver in history to three-peat at the Indy 500.

The official entry list was released on May 13.

| No. | Driver | Team | Engine | Sponsor | Ref. |
|---|---|---|---|---|---|
| 2 | (United States) Josef Newgarden W | Team Penske | Chevrolet | Shell | |
| 3 | (New Zealand) Scott McLaughlin | Team Penske | Chevrolet | Pennzoil | |
| 4 | (United States) David Malukas | A. J. Foyt Racing | Chevrolet | Clarience Technologies | |
| 5 | (Mexico) Pato O'Ward | Arrow McLaren | Chevrolet | Arrow Electronics | |
| 6 | (United States) Nolan Siegel R (Note: Siegel, who was an NTT IndyCar Series rookie in 2024, failed to qualify for the 2024 Indianapolis 500, so he must retake all phases of the Indianapolis 500 rookie test and will be eligible for all Indianapolis 500 rookie awards.) | Arrow McLaren | Chevrolet | NTT Data | |
| 06 | (Brazil) Hélio Castroneves W | Meyer Shank Racing with Curb-Agajanian | Honda | Cleveland-Cliffs | |
| 7 | (Denmark) Christian Lundgaard | Arrow McLaren | Chevrolet | VELO | |
| 8 | (Cayman Islands) Kyffin Simpson | Chip Ganassi Racing | Honda | Journie Rewards | |
| 9 | (New Zealand) Scott Dixon W | Chip Ganassi Racing | Honda | PNC Bank | |
| 10 | (Spain) Álex Palou | Chip Ganassi Racing | Honda | DHL | |
| 12 | (Australia) Will Power W | Team Penske | Chevrolet | Verizon | |
| 14 | (United States) Santino Ferrucci | A. J. Foyt Racing | Chevrolet | Homes For Our Troops | |
| 15 | (United States) Graham Rahal | Rahal Letterman Lanigan Racing | Honda | United Rentals | |
| 17 | (United States) Kyle Larson | Arrow McLaren with Rick Hendrick | Chevrolet | Hendrick Cars / Prime Video | |
| 18 | (Netherlands) Rinus VeeKay | Dale Coyne Racing | Honda | askROI | |
| 20 | (United States) Alexander Rossi W | ECR | Chevrolet | Java House | |
| 21 | (Denmark) Christian Rasmussen | ECR | Chevrolet | Splenda | |
| 23 | (United States) Ryan Hunter-Reay W | DRR-Cusick Motorsports | Chevrolet | Wedbush | |
| 24 | (United Kingdom) Jack Harvey | DRR-Cusick Motorsports | Chevrolet | INVST | |
| 26 | (United States) Colton Herta | Andretti Global with Curb-Agajanian | Honda | Gainbridge | |
| 27 | (United States) Kyle Kirkwood | Andretti Global | Honda | Siemens | |
| 28 | (Sweden) Marcus Ericsson W | Andretti Global | Honda | Allegra | |
| 30 | (Canada) Devlin DeFrancesco | Rahal Letterman Lanigan Racing | Honda | Dogecoin | |
| 33 | (United States) Ed Carpenter | ECR | Chevrolet | Splenda | |
| 45 | (United Kingdom) Louis Foster R | Rahal Letterman Lanigan Racing | Honda | Desnuda Organic Tequilla | |
| 51 | (United States) Jacob Abel R | Dale Coyne Racing | Honda | Miller High Life | |
| 60 | (Sweden) Felix Rosenqvist | Meyer Shank Racing | Honda | Creed / SiriusXM | |
| 66 | (New Zealand) Marcus Armstrong | Meyer Shank Racing with Curb-Agajanian | Honda | Spectrum | |
| 75 | (Japan) Takuma Sato W | Rahal Letterman Lanigan Racing | Honda | Amada | |
| 76 | (United States) Conor Daly | Juncos Hollinger Racing | Chevrolet | ampm | |
| 77 | (United States) Sting Ray Robb | Juncos Hollinger Racing | Chevrolet | GoodHeart | |
| 83 | (Israel) Robert Shwartzman R | Prema Racing | Chevrolet | Idra Group | |
| 90 | (United Kingdom) Callum Ilott | Prema Racing | Chevrolet | Idra Group | |
| 98 | (United States) Marco Andretti | Andretti Global | Honda | Mapei | |

- W Former Indianapolis 500 winner
- R Indianapolis 500 rookie

== Testing and Rookie Orientation ==
Rookie rules for the Indianapolis 500 include the mandate that a driver pass a supervised high-speed oval test before he/she is allowed to participate in the official Rookie Orientation Program (ROP) at the Indianapolis Motor Speedway. Approved venues for the initial high-speed oval track test include Texas Motor Speedway, Homestead–Miami Speedway, and a few other select venues.

The Rookie Orientation Program at Indianapolis consists of three phases. For phase 1, each driver is required to complete ten laps between 205–210 mph (330–338 km/h), while demonstrating satisfactory car control, proper racing line, and safe interaction with other cars on the circuit. The laps do not have to be consecutive. Phase 2 is fifteen laps between 210–215 mph (338–346 km/h), and phase 3 is fifteen laps over 215 mph (346 km/h). Veteran drivers that have not competed in an IndyCar oval race since the previous year's Indy 500 are required to take a refresher test. The refresher test consists of phase 2 and phase 3 of the aforementioned rookie test.

=== Rookie Orientation – October 2024 ===
A private Rookie Orientation Program session was held on October 10, 2024, for Nolan Siegel of Arrow McLaren. Siegel had passed ROP the previous May, however, he failed to qualify for the race, necessitating a re-taking of the rookie test. Siegel passed the three-phase test without incident.

=== Hybrid testing – October 2024 ===
A two-day offseason test was held on October 10–11, 2024. Eleven teams were in attendance to evaluate the hybrid energy recovery system powertrains which were adopted midway through the 2024 IndyCar season. On Thursday, Josef Newgarden (Team Penske), Pato O'Ward (Arrow McLaren), and Álex Palou (Ganassi) primarily conducted tire tests for Firestone. On Friday, all eleven teams participated. Álex Palou (224.342 mph) turned the fastest lap of the day. No incidents were reported.

=== Rookie oval testing ===
The series hosted a high-speed oval rookie evaluation test at Nashville Superspeedway on March 26. Two drivers participated: Robert Shwartzman and Louis Foster. Both drivers completed their evaluations and were approved to take the Rookie Orientation Program at the April Open Test at Indianapolis. Jacob Abel had previously completed his evaluation at Texas on November 14.

=== Open Test Day 1 — Wednesday April 23, 2025 ===
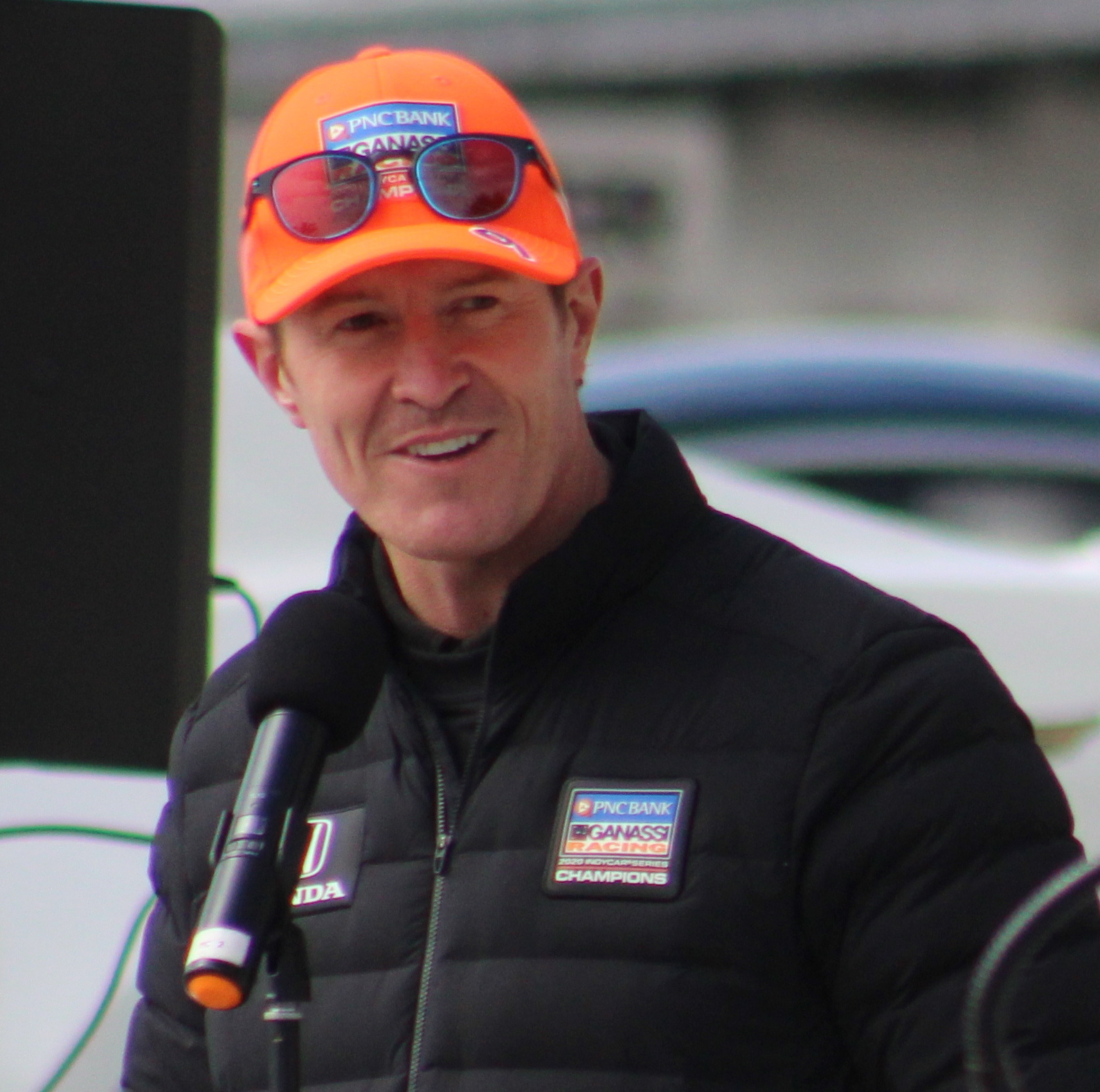
Scott Dixon (pictured in 2021) was fastest on Day 1 of the Open Test.

The first day of open testing was scheduled for April 23. Testing was originally slated to start at 10:05 a.m. However, an internet outage at the track caused communications problems between race control and teams, forcing testing to be delayed until 12:45 p.m. The revised schedule after the delay saw the track first open for series veterans from 12:45 p.m. to 2 p.m. Then, from 2 p.m. to 4 p.m., the track was opened to drivers needing to complete rookie and refresher tests. Finally, the track was opened to all entries at 4 p.m., with the end time of practice pushed back to 7 p.m.

- Weather: 77 °F (25 °C); Mostly cloudy
- Summary: The veterans session of the open test began at 12:45 p.m. after problems with internet connectivity around the track were solved. Two drivers - Jack Harvey and Santino Ferrucci - suffered mechanical problems and each brought out caution periods as they stopped on track. At 2 p.m., the veteran session ended and the track was opened for drivers needing rookie and refresher tests. Rookies Louis Foster, Jacob Abel, and Robert Shwartzman all completed their rookie tests, while Kyle Larson, Takuma Sato, Marco Andretti, Devlin DeFrancesco, and Callum Ilott all successfully completed their refresher tests. At 4 p.m., the track was open to all entries. One notable incident occurred during the session with 13 minutes remaining when Graham Rahal drifted wide in turn 3 and brushed the outside wall. The impact damaged Rahal's suspension and Rahal slowed significantly to avoid spinning. A caution was put out as many cars slowed behind Rahal to avoid the potential spin.

Scott Dixon was the fastest on the first day of testing, turning a lap at 225.182 mph (362.395 km/h). Felix Rosenqvist turned the fastest "no-tow" lap - a lap without the assistance of aerodynamic drafting - with a speed of 220.835 miles per hour (355.399 km/h).

Top speeds
| Pos | No. | Driver | Team | Engine | Speed (mph) | Speed (km/h) |
|---|---|---|---|---|---|---|
| 1 | 9 | (New Zealand) Scott Dixon W | Chip Ganassi Racing | Honda | 225.182 | 362.395 |
| 2 | 2 | (United States) Josef Newgarden W | Team Penske | Chevrolet | 225.125 | 362.304 |
| 3 | 75 | (Japan) Takuma Sato W | Rahal Letterman Lanigan Racing | Honda | 225.069 | 362.213 |
Official Report

=== Open Test Day 2 — Thursday April 24, 2025 ===
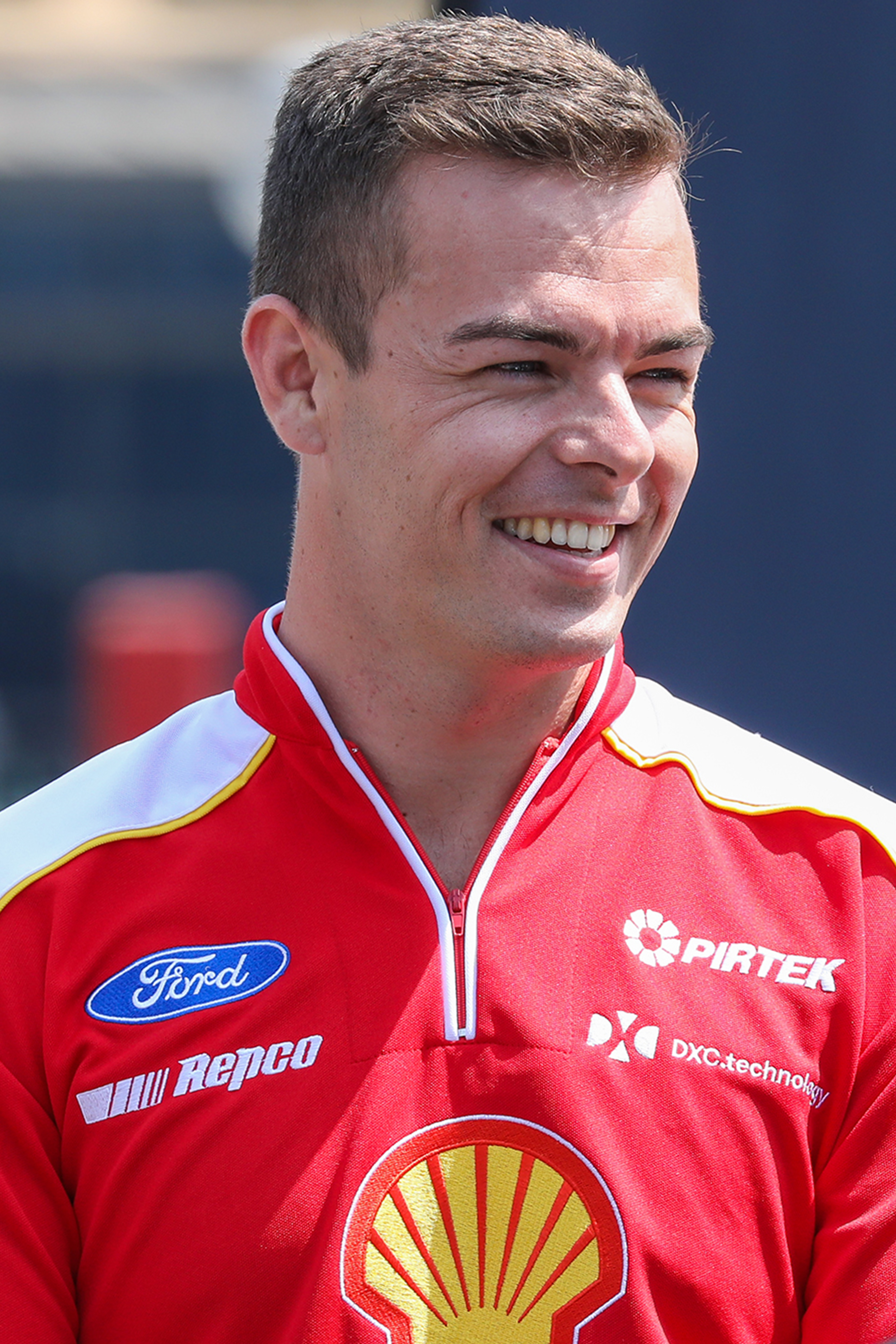
Scott McLaughlin (pictured in 2020) was fastest on Day 2 of the Open Test.

The second day of open testing was scheduled for April 24. Two sessions were scheduled for the second day. From 9:30 a.m. to 12 p.m., the track was opened for a "high boost" session, where teams were allowed to test with an increased turbocharger boost level of 1,500 mbar (44.3 inHg) matching the level permitted during time trials. The track was then open again from 2 p.m. to 5 p.m. for testing at the standard race day boost level of 1,300 mbar (38.4 inHg).

- Weather: 81 °F (27 °C); Partly cloudy in the morning, mostly cloudy in the afternoon

==== High Boost session ====
- Summary: The high boost session for the day began at 9:30 a.m. This session saw the first two major incidents of testing. At 10:37 a.m., Kyle Larson impacted the outside wall in turn 1, significantly damaging his car. Larson's damaged car continued sliding before impacting the wall a second time at turn 2. Afterwards, Larson blamed the crash on a miscue, saying he neglected to adjust the weight jacker going into turn one. At 10:54 a.m., less than twenty minutes after Larson's wreck, Takuma Sato also crashed after spinning in turn 1 and heavily impacting the wall. In a social media post later that day, Sato revealed that the accident registered at 94 Gs. Sato walked away from the accident under his own power, but revealed almost a month later that he had sustained a fractured rib in the accident and had been receiving Toradol shots for most of the month of May to deal with the pain. Scott McLaughlin was fastest in the high boost session, turning a lap at 232.686 miles per hour (374.472 km/h). Takuma Sato, prior to his crash, had turned the fastest "no-tow" lap at 232.565 miles per hour (374.277 km/h), which was fast enough for second overall in the session.

A few days after the test, Rahal Letterman Lanigan Racing announced that Takuma Sato's wrecked car was damaged beyond repair, and that he would be driving a new chassis when practice began in May.

Top speeds
| Pos | No. | Driver | Team | Engine | Speed (mph) | Speed (km/h) |
|---|---|---|---|---|---|---|
| 1 | 3 | (New Zealand) Scott McLaughlin | Team Penske | Chevrolet | 232.686 | 374.472 |
| 2 | 75 | (Japan) Takuma Sato W | Rahal Letterman Lanigan Racing | Honda | 232.565 | 374.277 |
| 3 | 12 | (Australia) Will Power W | Team Penske | Chevrolet | 232.278 | 373.815 |
Official Report

==== Second session ====
- Summary: The second session began at 2 p.m. and lasted until 5 p.m. For this session, cars returned to their race-spec boost levels of 1,300 mbar (38.4 inHg). One minor incident occurred at 2:54 p.m. when a draft train of seven cars was driving through turn two. Rinus VeeKay's car ran out of fuel, causing a sudden slow down. With two additional cars also entering the track ran from the warm-up lane, a melee almost ensued. Santino Ferrucci, Pato O'Ward, and Hélio Castroneves had to take evasive maneuvers to avoid tangling. Contact was avoided, the track stayed green, and VeeKay was able to coast back to pit lane. VeeKay's teammate Jacob Abel also ran out of fuel during the session, but no caution was required for him either. In the final hour, teams were allowed to practice hot pit stops, with many taking the opportunity to do so in the final twenty minutes. Álex Palou turned the fastest lap of the final session of the open test, with a one-lap speed of 223.993 miles per hour (360.482 km/h). Kyle Kirkwood was fastest in the "no-tow" rankings, running at 218.861 miles per hour (352.223 km/h).

Top speeds
| Pos | No. | Driver | Team | Engine | Speed (mph) | Speed (km/h) |
|---|---|---|---|---|---|---|
| 1 | 10 | (Spain) Álex Palou | Chip Ganassi Racing | Honda | 223.993 | 360.482 |
| 2 | 60 | (Sweden) Felix Rosenqvist | Meyer Shank Racing | Honda | 223.366 | 359.473 |
| 3 | 27 | (United States) Kyle Kirkwood | Andretti Global | Honda | 223.362 | 359.466 |
Official Report

== Practice ==
=== Opening Day — Tuesday May 13 ===
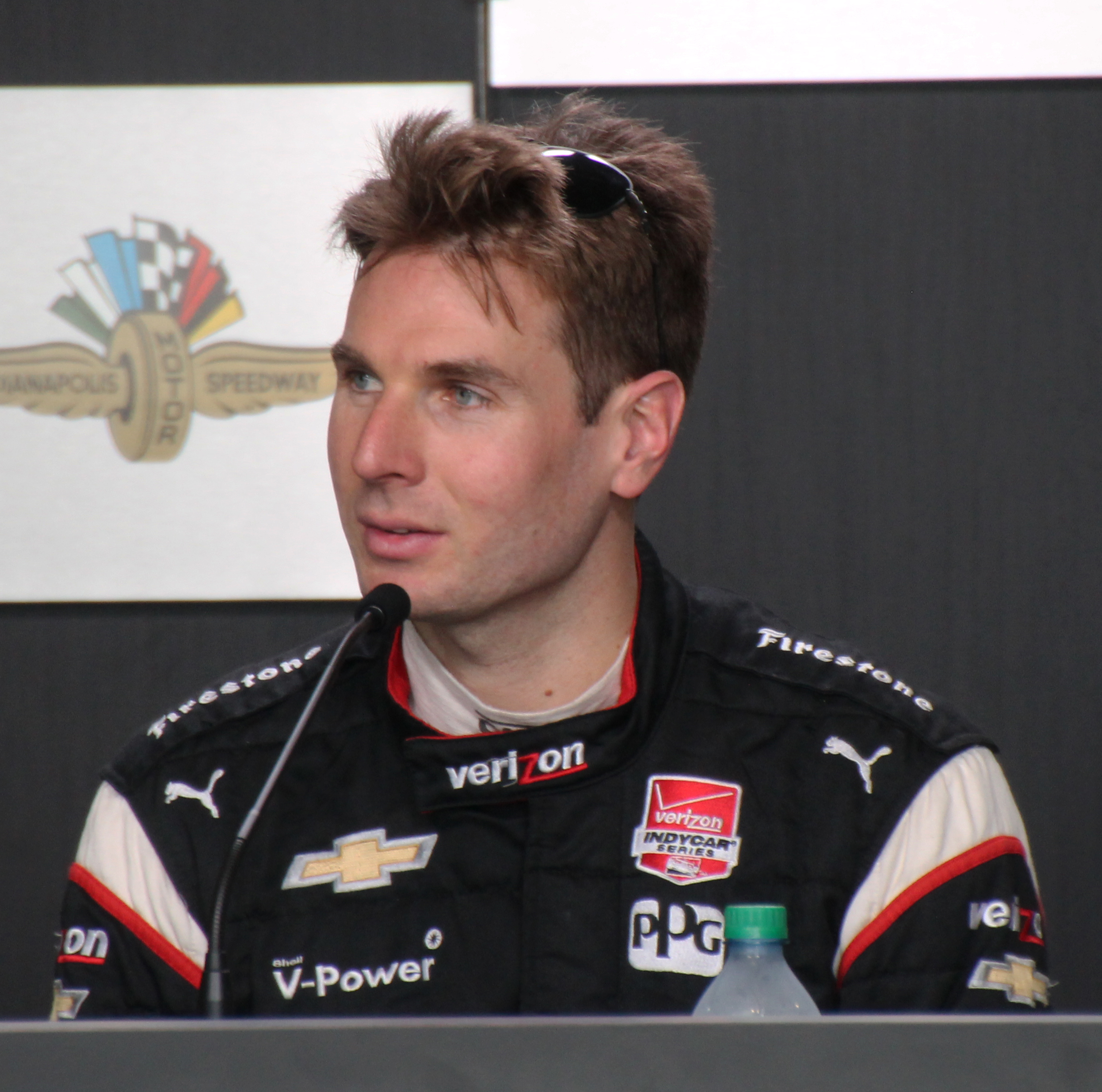
Will Power (pictured in 2015) turned the fastest lap on Opening Day.

- Weather: 78 °F (26 °C), Light rain early, mostly cloudy in late afternoon.
- Summary: The opening day of practice was scheduled to start at 12:00 p.m., but light rain throughout the early afternoon delayed running until 2:35 p.m. Once running began, no major incidents halted the session, though practice was ended at 5:29 p.m. – roughly 30 minutes earlier than the scheduled 6 p.m. end time – due to lightning in the nearby area. Will Power turned the fastest lap of the day, running at lap at 227.026 miles per hour (365.363 km/h). Kyle Kirkwood ran the fastest "no-tow" lap of the day, turning a lap at 219.497 miles per hour (353.246 km/h) without assistance from drafting. Due to the rain, the refresher session meant to allow Tony Kanaan to complete laps to be the backup for Kyle Larson was delayed until Wednesday.

Top speeds
| Pos | No. | Driver | Team | Engine | Speed (mph) | Speed (km/h) |
|---|---|---|---|---|---|---|
| 1 | 12 | (Australia) Will Power W | Team Penske | Chevrolet | 227.026 | 365.363 |
| 2 | 2 | (United States) Josef Newgarden W | Team Penske | Chevrolet | 226.971 | 365.274 |
| 3 | 10 | (Spain) Álex Palou | Chip Ganassi Racing | Honda | 226.673 | 364.795 |
Official Report

=== Wednesday May 14 ===
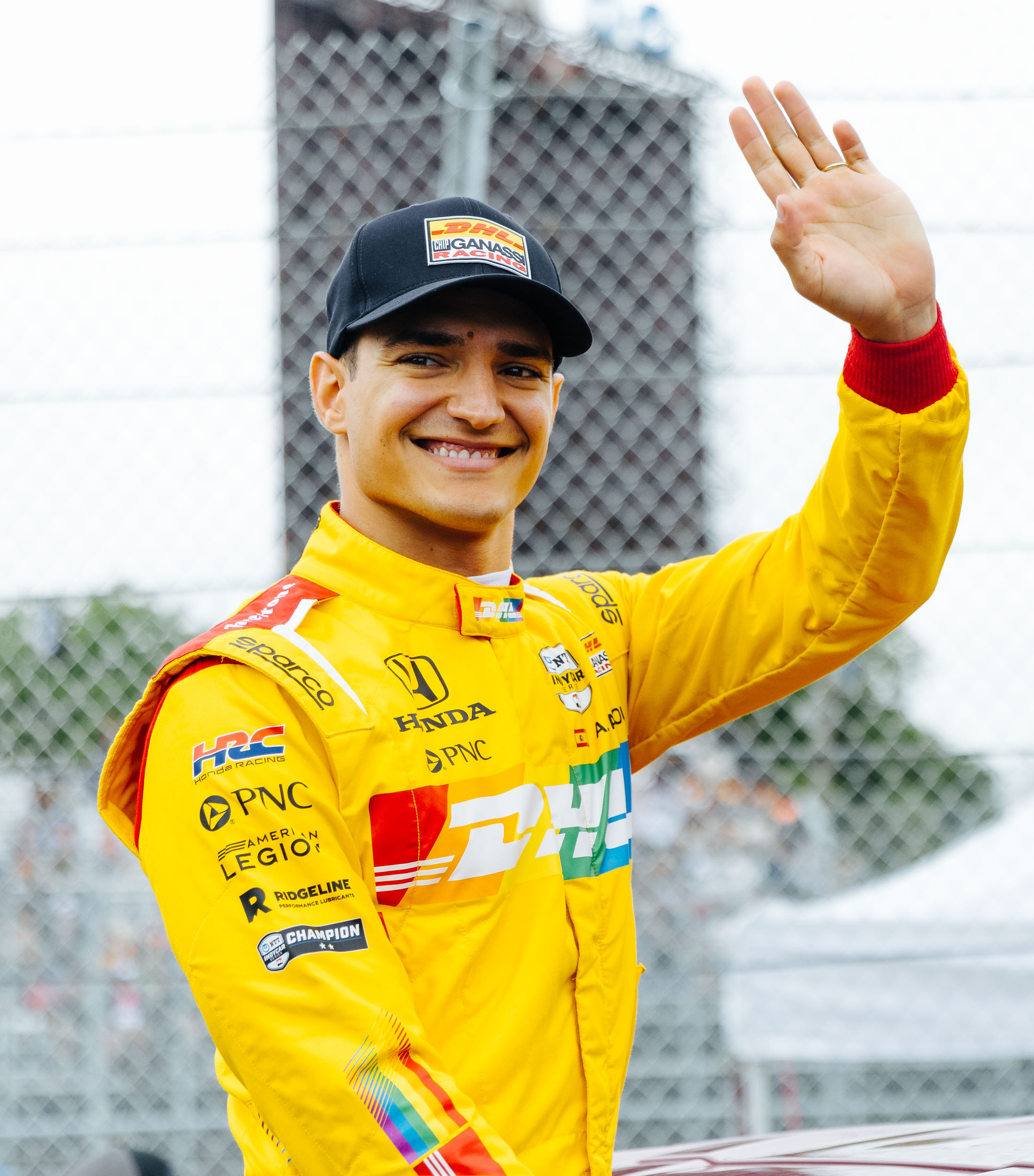
Álex Palou (pictured in 2024) was fastest on Wednesday

- Weather: 80 °F (27 °C), Mostly cloudy with intermittent periods of light rain
- Summary: Rain affected track activity for the second day in a row, with the practice start time delayed until 1:08 p.m. Lightning brought a halt to practice just after 4 p.m. for 54 minutes. A period of light rain at 5:16 p.m. then brought another yellow that lasted 15 minutes. Álex Palou turned the fastest lap of the day, running at 227.546 miles per hour (366.200 km/h). Kyle Kirkwood ran the fastest "no-tow" lap for the second day in a row, running a lap at 222.760 miles per hour (358.497 km/h). No major incident occurred during the session. The morning rain once again delayed the planned refresher test for Tony Kanaan. It was rescheduled for Thursday morning.

Top speeds
| Pos | No. | Driver | Team | Engine | Speed (mph) | Speed (km/h) |
|---|---|---|---|---|---|---|
| 1 | 10 | (Spain) Álex Palou | Chip Ganassi Racing | Honda | 227.546 | 366.200 |
| 2 | 12 | (Australia) Will Power W | Team Penske | Chevrolet | 225.584 | 363.042 |
| 3 | 2 | (United States) Josef Newgarden W | Team Penske | Chevrolet | 225.545 | 362.979 |
Official Report

=== Thursday May 15 ===
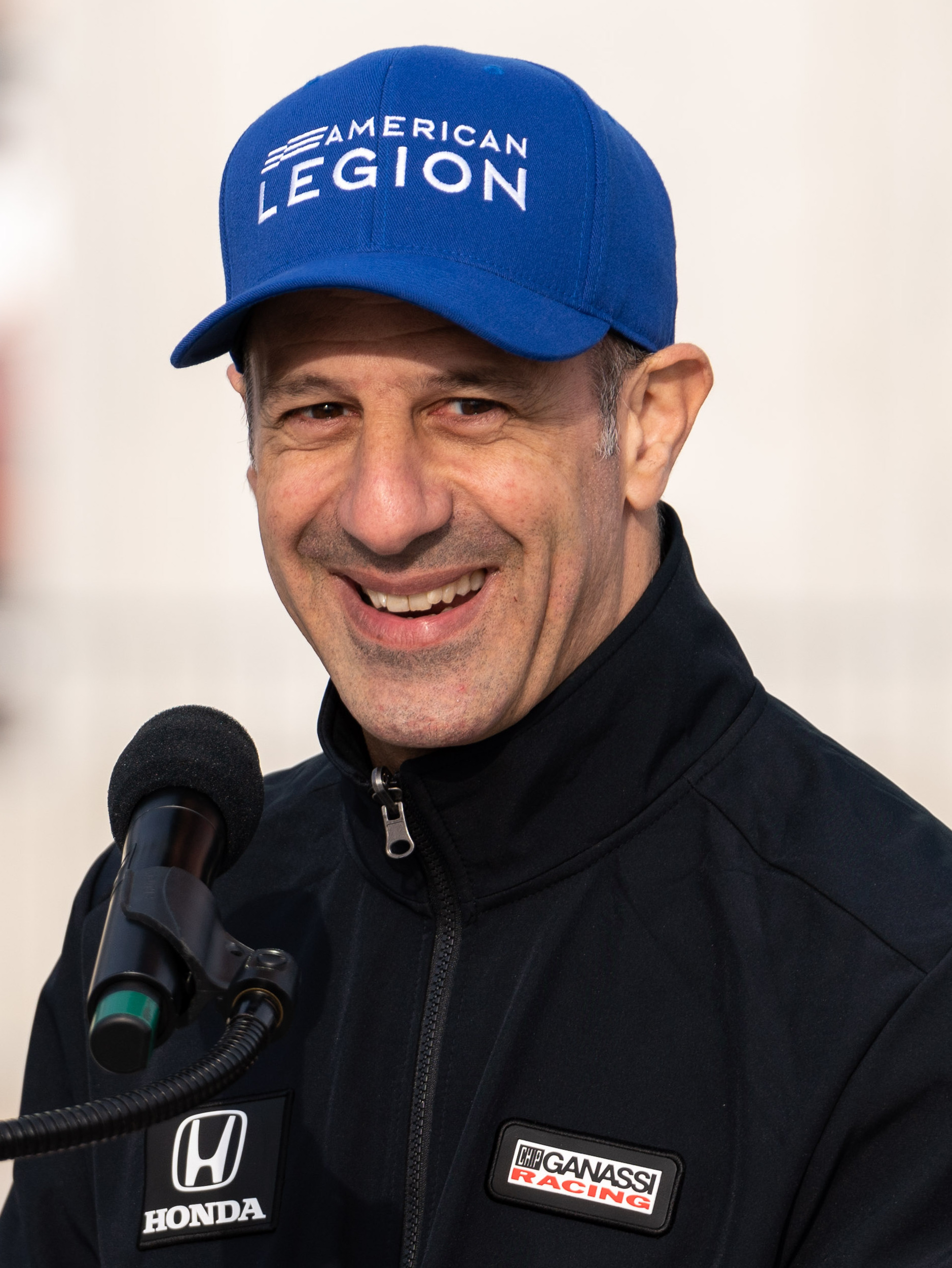
Tony Kanaan (pictured in 2022) completed a refresher test on Thursday morning.

- Weather: 86 °F (30 °C), Mostly cloudy with moderate wind in the early afternoon.
- Summary: Prior to Thursday practice, Scott Dixon's team performed an engine change following a problem in his final run on Wednesday. The engine was Dixon's fourth engine used during the 2025 season. Thursday began with a 1-hour, 45-minute session in the morning for Tony Kanaan to complete refresher testing. The track opened for all competitors at 12 p.m. Several teams began running qualifying simulations, and in the last hour of the day there was little race-trim running occurring. Thursday practice saw the first significant incident of the week at 4:13 p.m., when Christian Rasmussen spun in turn 2 and made light contact with the wall. Rasmusssen escaped with only minor damage and returned to the track later in the day. Josef Newgarden turned the fastest lap of the day at 226.632 miles per hour (364.729 km/h). Newgarden was also fastest in the "no-tow" rankings, with a lap at 222.555 miles per hour (358.168 km/h) without aerodynamic drafting.

Top speeds
| Pos | No. | Driver | Team | Engine | Speed (mph) | Speed (km/h) |
|---|---|---|---|---|---|---|
| 1 | 2 | (United States) Josef Newgarden W | Team Penske | Chevrolet | 226.632 | 364.729 |
| 2 | 9 | (New Zealand) Scott Dixon W | Chip Ganassi Racing | Honda | 225.457 | 362.838 |
| 3 | 76 | (United States) Conor Daly | Juncos Hollinger Racing | Chevrolet | 224.893 | 361.930 |
Official Report

=== Fast Friday — Friday May 16 ===
- Weather: 83 °F (28 °C), Fair with moderate winds
- Summary: For Friday practice, teams were allowed to increase to qualifying boost levels of 1,500 mbar (44.3 inHg) and teams primarily practice qualifying simulations. Two major incidents occurred during the session. At 12:49 p.m., Kyffin Simpson lost control of his car in turn 4, spun, and impacted the outside wall. As the car slid backwards, it briefly became airborne before landing upright and sliding on to pit lane before coming to a stop. Simpson was uninjured, but the car was damaged beyond repair. The team elected to change to a back-up chassis before qualifying. At 4:29 p.m. Kyle Larson lost control of his car in turn 3, causing him to spin and impact the wall nose first. He continued sliding to turn 4 where it hit the outside wall again at the rear. Larson's car was only slightly damaged in the incident, and Larson returned to the track roughly an hour later to run an installation lap once repairs were completed. Scott McLaughlin turned the fastest lap of the day at 233.954 miles per hour (376.512 km/h). Scott Dixon ran the fastest "no-tow" lap of the day at 232.561 miles per hour (374.271 km/h). Dixon had the fastest four-lap run - a simulation of a full qualification attempt - with a four-lap average of 232.366 miles per hour (373.957 km/h). Following Friday practice, the random draw to determine qualifying order for Saturday was held.

Top speeds
| Pos | No. | Driver | Team | Engine | Speed (mph) | Speed (km/h) |
|---|---|---|---|---|---|---|
| 1 | 3 | (New Zealand) Scott McLaughlin | Team Penske | Chevrolet | 233.954 | 376.512 |
| 2 | 9 | (New Zealand) Scott Dixon W | Chip Ganassi Racing | Honda | 232.561 | 374.271 |
| 3 | 10 | (Spain) Álex Palou | Chip Ganassi Racing | Honda | 232.528 | 374.218 |
Official Report

== Time Trials ==
=== Saturday, May 17 ===
- Weather: 70 °F (21 °C), Mostly cloudy with strong winds gusting to 35 mph

==== Pre-qualifying practice ====
- Summary: A pre-qualifying practice was held in the morning starting at 8:30 a.m., with the session split into two 30-minute segments. At 8:42 a.m., Marcus Armstrong suffered a major accident after losing control of his car in turn 1 and impacting the outside wall. Armstrong was transported to the infield medical care center for extended evaluation after the incident, though was awake and alert. Felix Rosenqvist ran the fastest single lap of the morning session, while Álex Palou ran the fastest "no-tow" lap.

==== Qualifying ====
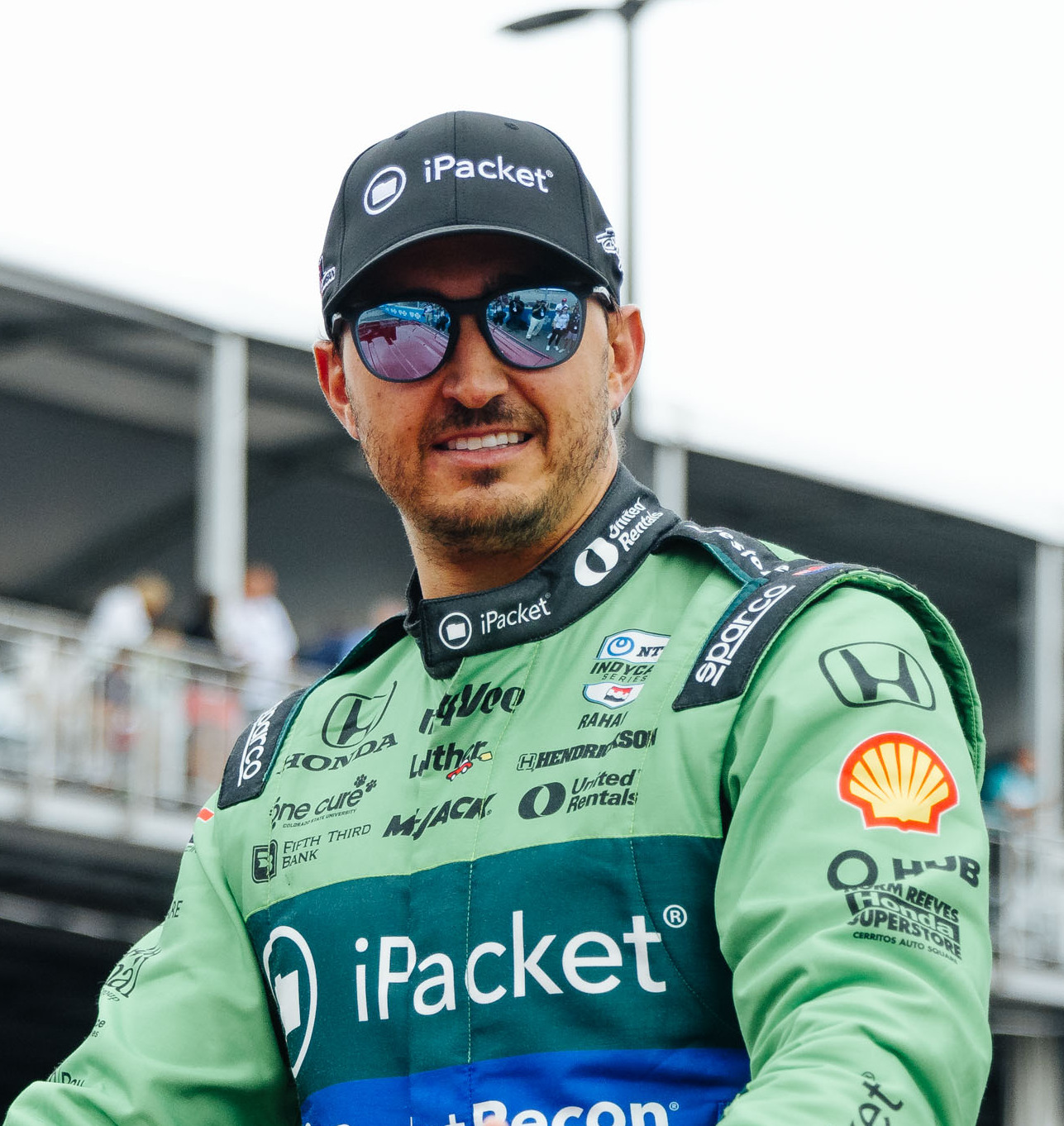
Graham Rahal (pictured in 2024) finished Saturday "on the bubble", the 30th and final car locked-in to the starting grid.

- Summary:The first day of qualifying was scheduled from 11:00 a.m. to 5:50 p.m. Cars qualifying 1st–12th advanced to the Top 12 Qualifying session on Sunday. Cars qualifying in positions 13th–30th were locked-in to those positions. Cars qualifying 31st–34th moved on to take part in the Last Chance Qualifying session on Sunday to determine the final row of the starting grid. All entered cars were eligible for one guaranteed attempt on Saturday, then unlimited additional attempts were permitted, time-permitting, until 5:50 p.m.

One major accident occurred at 12:05 p.m. during the guaranteed runs, when Colton Herta spun in turn 1 on the first lap of his attempt and heavily impacted the outside wall. Herta's car then became airborne, flipped and landed upside down before sliding against the turn 2 wall and coming to a stop. Herta's Andretti Global team switched to a backup car after the accident, and Herta would qualify later in the day in the 29th position.

Álex Palou was fastest in the first day of qualifying, turning a four-lap average of 233.043 miles per hour (375.046 km/h). Team Penske teammates Scott McLaughlin and Josef Newgarden were also above 233 mph with their runs, running at 233.013 miles per hour (374.998 km/h) and 233.004 miles per hour (374.984 km/h) respectively. Prema Racing's Robert Shwartzman was the fastest rookie qualifier at 232.584 miles per hour (374.308 km/h), fast enough for sixth place and a spot in the following day's Fast 12 qualifying session. Conor Daly narrowly missed out on making the Fast 12 qualifying session, qualifying 13th in the final attempt of the day before the track closed.

With only the top 30 cars locked in during Saturday qualifying, the slowest four qualifiers would need to qualify again on Sunday in the Last Chance Qualifying session. The fight for the 30th and final locked-in position for much of the day was between Graham Rahal and Marco Andretti. Rahal narrowly avoided being in the Last Chance Qualifying for a third-straight year, besting Andretti by only 0.0028 seconds. Andretti was thereby relegated to Last Chance Qualifying on Sunday. Dale Coyne Racing teammates Rinus VeeKay and Jacob Abel also posted times too slow to make the top 30 and were also relegated to the Last Chance Qualifier. Marcus Armstrong, driving a backup car after his crash in morning practice, made two qualifying attempts late in the day, but aborted both runs and posted no time on Saturday.

| Pos | No. | Driver | Team | Engine | Speed (mph) | Speed (km/h) |
Top 12 qualifiers
| 1 | 10 | (Spain) Álex Palou | Chip Ganassi Racing | Honda | 233.043 | 375.046 |
| 2 | 3 | (New Zealand) Scott McLaughlin | Team Penske | Chevrolet | 233.013 | 374.998 |
| 3 | 2 | (United States) Josef Newgarden W | Team Penske | Chevrolet | 233.004 | 374.984 |
| 4 | 5 | (Mexico) Pato O'Ward | Arrow McLaren | Chevrolet | 232.820 | 374.687 |
| 5 | 9 | (New Zealand) Scott Dixon W | Chip Ganassi Racing | Honda | 232.659 | 374.428 |
| 6 | 83 | (Israel) Robert Shwartzman R | Prema Racing | Chevrolet | 232.584 | 374.308 |
| 7 | 4 | (United States) David Malukas | A. J. Foyt Racing | Chevrolet | 232.546 | 374.247 |
| 8 | 60 | (Sweden) Felix Rosenqvist | Meyer Shank Racing | Honda | 232.449 | 374.090 |
| 9 | 75 | (Japan) Takuma Sato W | Rahal Letterman Lanigan Racing | Honda | 232.415 | 374.036 |
| 10 | 12 | (Australia) Will Power W | Team Penske | Chevrolet | 232.144 | 373.600 |
| 11 | 28 | (Sweden) Marcus Ericsson W | Andretti Global | Honda | 232.132 | 373.580 |
| 12 | 7 | (Denmark) Christian Lundgaard | Arrow McLaren | Chevrolet | 231.809 | 373.060 |
Positions 13–30
| 13 | 76 | (United States) Conor Daly | Juncos Hollinger Racing | Chevrolet | 231.725 | 372.925 |
| 14 | 20 | (United States) Alexander Rossi W | ECR | Chevrolet | 231.701 | 372.887 |
| 15 | 8 | (Cayman Islands) Kyffin Simpson | Chip Ganassi Racing | Honda | 231.641 | 372.790 |
| 16 | 33 | (United States) Ed Carpenter | ECR | Chevrolet | 231.633 | 372.777 |
| 17 | 14 | (United States) Santino Ferrucci | A. J. Foyt Racing | Chevrolet | 231.593 | 372.713 |
| 18 | 30 | (Canada) Devlin DeFrancesco | Rahal Letterman Lanigan Racing | Honda | 231.575 | 372.684 |
| 19 | 77 | (United States) Sting Ray Robb | Juncos Hollinger Racing | Chevrolet | 231.461 | 372.500 |
| 20 | 21 | (Denmark) Christian Rasmussen | ECR | Chevrolet | 231.438 | 372.463 |
| 21 | 17 | (United States) Kyle Larson | Arrow McLaren w/ Rick Hendrick | Chevrolet | 231.326 | 372.283 |
| 22 | 45 | (United Kingdom) Louis Foster R | Rahal Letterman Lanigan Racing | Honda | 231.058 | 371.852 |
| 23 | 90 | (United Kingdom) Callum Ilott | Prema Racing | Chevrolet | 230.993 | 371.747 |
| 24 | 06 | (Brazil) Hélio Castroneves W | Meyer Shank Racing | Honda | 230.978 | 371.723 |
| 25 | 27 | (United States) Kyle Kirkwood | Andretti Global | Honda | 230.917 | 371.625 |
| 26 | 6 | (United States) Nolan Siegel R | Arrow McLaren | Chevrolet | 230.571 | 371.068 |
| 27 | 23 | (United States) Ryan Hunter-Reay W | DRR-Cusick Motorsports | Chevrolet | 230.363 | 370.733 |
| 28 | 24 | (United Kingdom) Jack Harvey | DRR-Cusick Motorsports | Chevrolet | 230.348 | 370.709 |
| 29 | 26 | (United States) Colton Herta | Andretti Global | Honda | 230.192 | 370.458 |
| 30 | 15 | (United States) Graham Rahal | Rahal Letterman Lanigan Racing | Honda | 229.863 | 369.929 |
Did not qualify – relegated to Last Chance Qualifying
| 31 | 98 | (United States) Marco Andretti | Andretti-Herta Autosport w/ Marco Andretti and Curb-Agajanian | Honda | 229.859 | 369.922 |
| 32 | 18 | (Netherlands) Rinus VeeKay | Dale Coyne Racing | Honda | 229.519 | 369.375 |
| 33 | 51 | (United States) Jacob Abel R | Dale Coyne Racing | Honda | 226.859 | 365.094 |
| 34 | 66 | (New Zealand) Marcus Armstrong | Meyer Shank Racing | Honda | No time | |
Official Report

=== Sunday, May 18 ===
- Weather: 74 °F (23 °C), Fair

==== Pre-qualifying practice ====
- Summary: A pre-qualifying practice was held from 1:00 p.m. to 3:00 p.m. The first hour of practice was open to cars participating in the Fast 12 qualifying, while the second hour was open to cars in the Last Chance Qualifying. At 1:18 p.m., Scott McLaughlin, on the fourth and final lap of a simulated qualifying run, spun exiting turn 2 and heavily impacted the wall. The car became airborne and initially landed on its side, severing the left-rear wheel from the car and creating a gouge in the track surface before it came back down upright. McLaughlin was uninjured, but the car was damaged beyond repair. The team announced that he would not participate in the Fast 12 session and would move to a backup car. McLaughlin had turned the fastest lap of practice prior to his accident, running at 233.533 miles per hour (375.835 km/h).

==== Top 12 qualifying ====
- Summary: Top 12 qualifying began at 4:05 p.m., with each entry permitted one attempt. Positions 1–6 in this session advanced to the Fast Six qualifying session, while positions 7–12 were locked in to their spots. Prior to the start of the session, both remaining Team Penske cars of Josef Newgarden and Will Power failed pre-qualifying technical inspection and were thereby not allowed to compete in the session. Team president Tim Cindric explained afterwards that the issue was over filling seams in the cars' rear-crash structures to improve airflow, which was a violation of INDYCAR rules. Since they did not make an attempt during the Top 12 session, the three Penske cars were lined up behind all other Top 12 qualifiers in the order of their Saturday qualification times. Scott McLaughlin was assigned 10th starting position, Newgarden 11th, and Power 12th. IndyCar indicated that further potential penalties for the technical violations would be possible pending investigation.

During Top 12 qualifying, Felix Rosenqvist ran the fastest time at 232.523 miles per hour (374.209 km/h). Also advancing to the Fast Six session were Pato O'Ward, Robert Shwartzman, Scott Dixon, Álex Palou, and Takuma Sato. Following the conclusion of Top 12 qualifying, the Last Chance Qualifier began.

| Pos | No. | Driver | Team | Engine | Speed (mph) | Speed (km/h) |
Fast Six qualifiers
| 1 | 60 | (Sweden) Felix Rosenqvist | Meyer Shank Racing | Honda | 232.523 | 374.209 |
| 2 | 5 | (Mexico) Pato O'Ward | Arrow McLaren | Chevrolet | 232.186 | 373.667 |
| 3 | 83 | (Israel) Robert Shwartzman R | Prema Racing | Chevrolet | 232.008 | 373.381 |
| 4 | 9 | (New Zealand) Scott Dixon W | Chip Ganassi Racing | Honda | 231.971 | 373.321 |
| 5 | 10 | (Spain) Álex Palou | Chip Ganassi Racing | Honda | 231.800 | 373.046 |
| 6 | 75 | (Japan) Takuma Sato W | Rahal Letterman Lanigan Racing | Honda | 231.686 | 372.862 |
Positions 7–12
| 7 | 4 | (United States) David Malukas | A. J. Foyt Racing | Chevrolet | 231.599 | 372.722 |
| 8 | 7 | (Denmark) Christian Lundgaard | Arrow McLaren | Chevrolet | 231.360 | 372.338 |
| 9 | 28 | (Sweden) Marcus Ericsson W | Andretti Global | Honda | 231.014 | 371.781 |
| 10 | 3 | (New Zealand) Scott McLaughlin | Team Penske | Chevrolet | No time | |
| 11 | 2 | (United States) Josef Newgarden W | Team Penske | Chevrolet | No time | |
| 12 | 12 | (Australia) Will Power W | Team Penske | Chevrolet | No time | |
Official Report

==== Last Chance Qualifying ====
- Summary: Last Chance Qualifying began at 5:15 p.m. and lasted one hour. The session determined positions 31–33 on the starting grid, as well as the one entry failing to qualify. All entries were given one guaranteed attempt. Unlimited subsequent attempts were permitted, but would require that their existing times be withdrawn and erased. After the guaranteed runs, Marco Andretti was comfortably in 31st position, with Marcus Armstrong fairly close behind in 32nd. Rinus VeeKay sat in the 33rd and final position, with Jacob Abel not in the field as 34th fastest. With under 8 minutes remaining, VeeKay's crew withdrew his time in order to make another attempt. However, he ran slower on his second attempt at 226.913 miles per hour (365.181 km/h) and fell within potential reach of Abel. Just before time expired, Abel took to the track for one last attempt. However, Abel was unable to bump his way into the field, only running at 226.394 miles per hour (364.346 km/h). VeeKay held on to 33rd position, and Abel failed to qualify.

| Pos | No. | Driver | Team | Engine | Speed (mph) | Speed (km/h) |
Positions 31–33
| 31 | 98 | (United States) Marco Andretti | Andretti-Herta Autosport w/ Marco Andretti and Curb-Agajanian | Honda | 229.741 | 369.732 |
| 32 | 66 | (New Zealand) Marcus Armstrong | Meyer Shank Racing | Honda | 229.091 | 368.686 |
| 33 | 18 | (Netherlands) Rinus VeeKay | Dale Coyne Racing | Honda | 226.913 | 365.181 |
Failed to Qualify
| 34 | 51 | (United States) Jacob Abel R | Dale Coyne Racing | Honda | 226.394 | 364.346 |
Official Report

==== Fast Six Qualifying ====
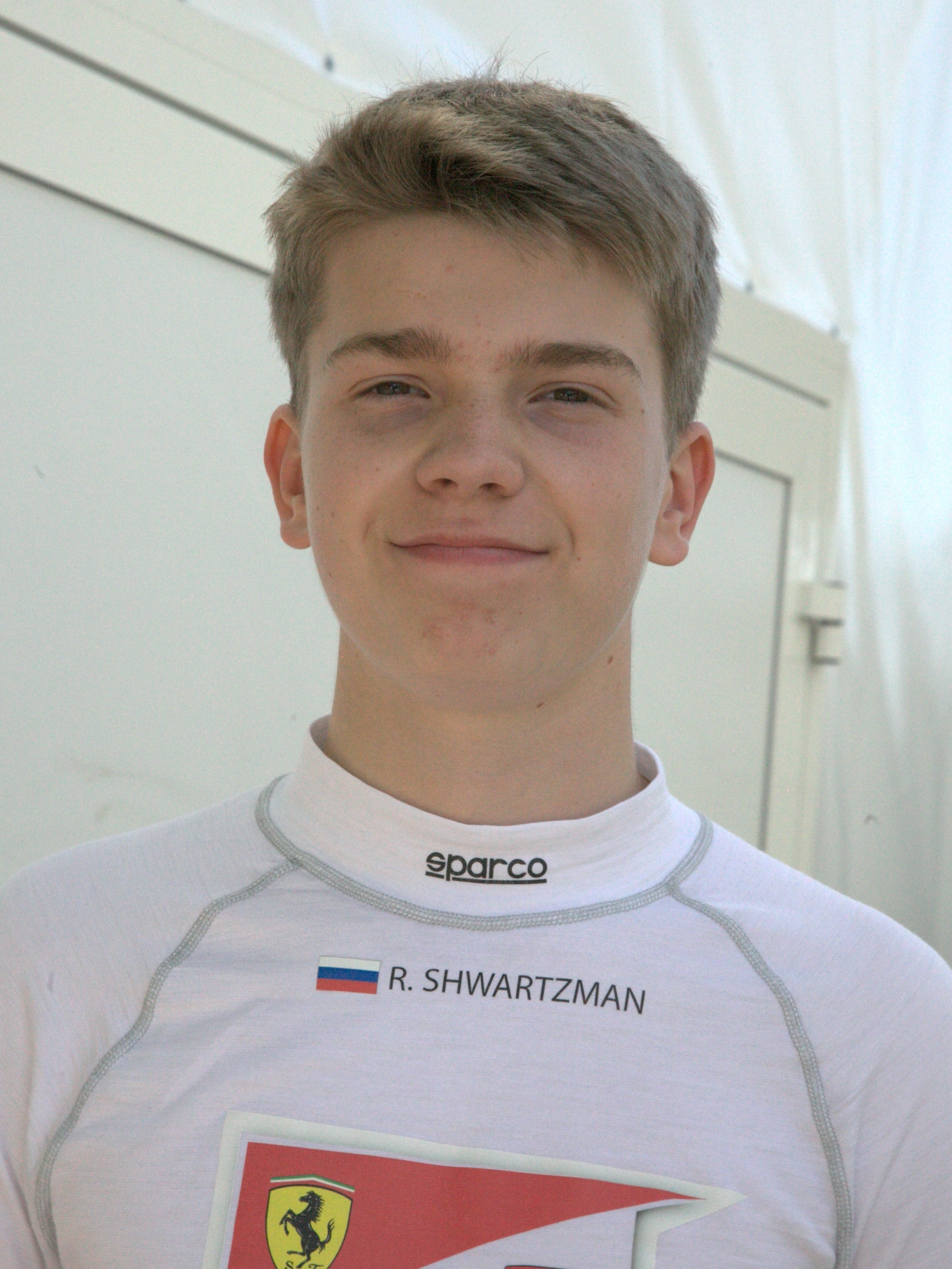
Robert Shwartzman (pictured in 2018) became the first rookie to qualify on pole position since 1983.

- Summary: Fast Six qualifying began at 6:25 p.m., which all drivers given one attempt to qualify. This session determined the first six starting spots on the starting grid. Rookie Robert Shwartzman qualified on pole position with a four-lap average at 232.790 miles per hour (374.639 km/h), the Russo-Israeli deposing two-time winner Takuma Sato with the fourth run of the session. The result was considered surprising, as neither Shwartzman nor the Prema Racing team he drove for had prior oval racing experience prior to this event. Shwartzman was the first race rookie to qualify on pole since Teo Fabi in 1983, whilst the Prema team additionally became the first rookie team to qualify on pole position at the Indianapolis 500 since Teddy Mayer's Mayer Motor Racing team in 1984. Sato qualified in 2nd place, while Pato O'Ward completed the front row.

| Pos | No. | Driver | Team | Engine | Speed (mph) | Speed (km/h) |
Positions 1–6
| 1 | 83 | (Israel) Robert Shwartzman R | Prema Racing | Chevrolet | 232.790 | 374.639 |
| 2 | 75 | (Japan) Takuma Sato W | Rahal Letterman Lanigan Racing | Honda | 232.478 | 374.137 |
| 3 | 5 | (Mexico) Pato O'Ward | Arrow McLaren | Chevrolet | 232.098 | 373.526 |
| 4 | 9 | (New Zealand) Scott Dixon W | Chip Ganassi Racing | Honda | 232.052 | 373.451 |
| 5 | 60 | (Sweden) Felix Rosenqvist | Meyer Shank Racing | Honda | 231.987 | 373.347 |
| 6 | 10 | (Spain) Álex Palou | Chip Ganassi Racing | Honda | 231.378 | 372.367 |
Official Report

=== Post-qualifying penalties ===
An overnight investigation was held in to the technical infractions committed by Team Penske's cars prior to the Fast 12. On May 19, Indycar announced that both Josef Newgarden and Will Power would be moved to the rear of the grid and start from 32nd and 33rd, respectively. For both entries, the team strategists were suspended for the remainder of the event, the teams were fined $100,000 each, and the entries were stripped of all points for qualifying in the top 12. The third Penske car of Scott McLaughlin was found not to be in violation of rules and thereby maintained its starting position. Some consideration was given to elevating Jacob Abel in to the starting grid and pushing one of the Penske cars out, but this was dismissed. IndyCar and Indianapolis Motor Speedway president Doug Boles remarked on the topic that Penske's cars had passed technical inspection on Saturday and had successfully qualified in the top 30 "locked-in" positions, meaning that they should still be considered among the traditional fastest 33 starters.

Journalists that visited Newgarden's 2024 Indy 500-winning car kept on display at the Indianapolis Motor Speedway Museum found the same modified attenuator installed that failed inspection.

In the fallout of the technical infractions, Team Penske announced on May 21 that team president Tim Cindric, managing director Ron Ruzewski, and general manager Kyle Moyer had all been terminated by the team.

== Post-qualifying practice ==
=== Post-qualifying practice — Monday May 19 ===
- Weather: 74 °F (23 °C), Mostly cloudy
- Summary: A two-hour session from 1:00–3:00 p.m. was scheduled the day after qualifying. With qualifying completed, teams returned to their race-trim turbo boost levels. One incident occurred during the session at 1:13 p.m., when Christian Rasmussen slid wide in turn 2 and impacted the outside wall. The impact damaged Rasmussen's suspension, causing him to lose control, spin, and heavily impact the inside wall on the backstraight. Álex Palou was fastest in the Monday session, running a lap at 226.765 miles per hour (364.943 km/h).

Top practice speeds
| Pos | No. | Driver | Team | Engine | Speed (mph) | Speed (km/h) |
|---|---|---|---|---|---|---|
| 1 | 10 | (Spain) Álex Palou | Chip Ganassi Racing | Honda | 226.765 | 364.943 |
| 2 | 06 | (Brazil) Hélio Castroneves W | Meyer Shank Racing | Honda | 226.441 | 364.421 |
| 3 | 75 | (Japan) Takuma Sato W | Rahal Letterman Lanigan Racing | Honda | 226.087 | 363.852 |
Official Report

=== Carb Day – Friday May 23 ===
- Weather: 64 °F (18 °C), Mostly cloudy
- Summary: Carb Day was the final practice day before the race. A two-hour session was scheduled from 11:00 a.m. until 1:00 p.m. While no incidents occurred during the session, several drivers suffered mechanical failures that necessitated caution periods. At 11:38 a.m., Graham Rahal suffered an engine problem and came to a halt on the backstraight. At 12:18, Ryan Hunter-Reay suffered a major fire in his car and came to a stop at the entrance to the pit lane. The fire caused significant damage to Hunter-Reay's car, forcing his team to switch to a backup car. At 12:45 p.m., Takuma Sato suffered an engine problem and came to halt on his backstraight. Josef Newgarden was the fastest in Carb Day practice, running a lap at 225.687 miles per hour (363.208 km/h).

Top practice speeds
| Pos | No. | Driver | Team | Engine | Speed (mph) | Speed (km/h) |
|---|---|---|---|---|---|---|
| 1 | 2 | (United States) Josef Newgarden W | Team Penske | Chevrolet | 225.687 | 363.208 |
| 2 | 75 | (Japan) Takuma Sato W | Rahal Letterman Lanigan Racing | Honda | 225.415 | 362.770 |
| 3 | 9 | (New Zealand) Scott Dixon W | Chip Ganassi Racing | Honda | 225.200 | 362.424 |
Official Report

== Carb Day events ==
=== Wienie 500 ===
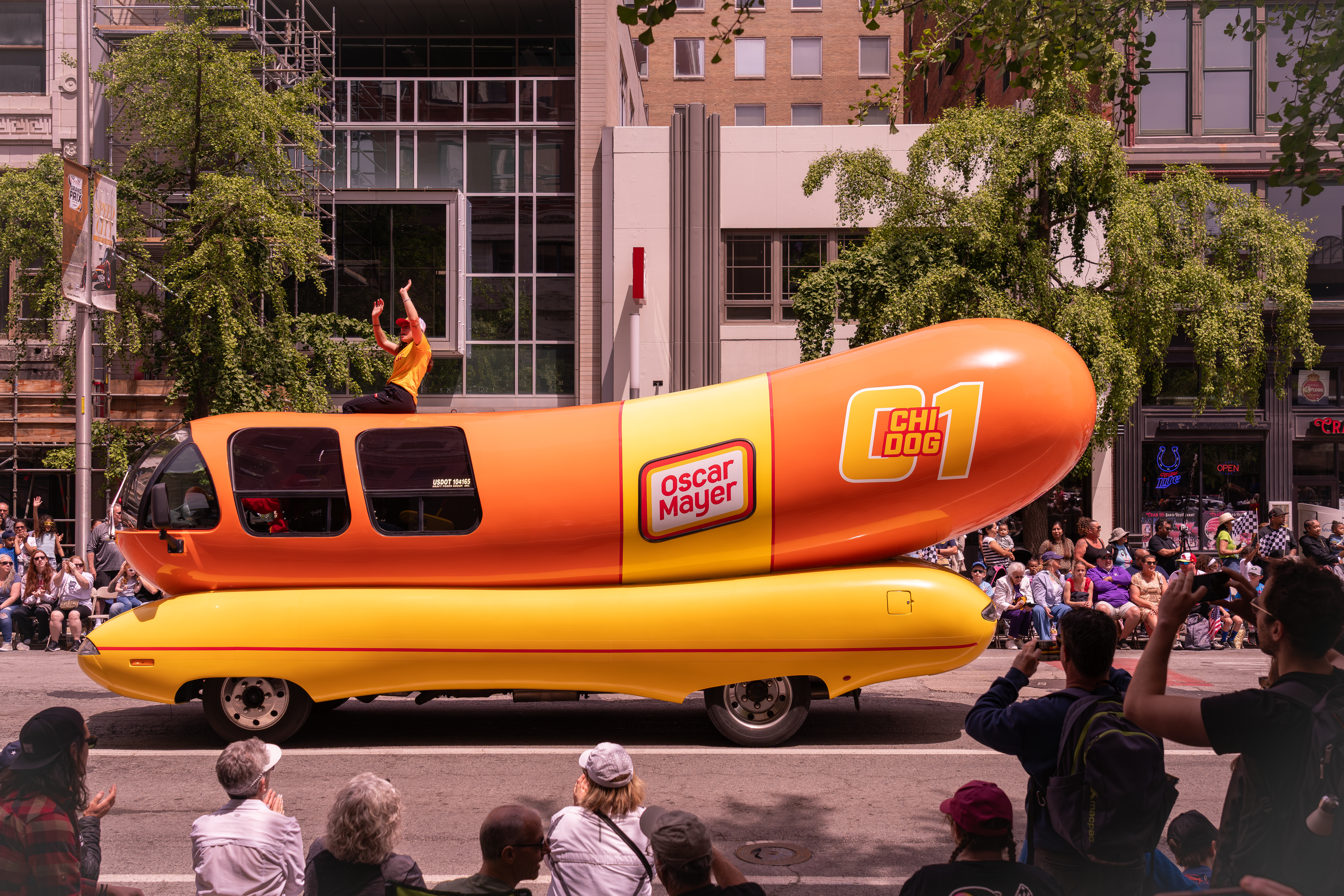
The "Chicago Dog" Wienermobile finished second in the Wienie 500 (pictured during the 500 Festival Parade the day after the race).

As part of Carb Day festivities, a race between all six existing Oscar Mayer Wienermobiles was announced, with each Wienermobile representing a different regional dog. The race, titled the "Wienie 500", was claimed to be the first gathering of all Wienermobiles in over a decade. The 5-mile race consisted of two laps around the track from a standing start.

The #02 New York Dog grabbed the lead at the start, and led the field into turn one. Down the backstretch, the #01 Chicago Dog made a pass for the lead, with the #04 Sonoran Dog slipping into second. Chicago Dog led the first lap, with Sonoran Dog close behind in second, and the #08 Slaw Dog third. Just after the start/finish line, Sonoran Dog took over the lead, and led through turn one. Coming out of turn two, Sonoran Dog's engine started smoking, possibly overheating, which handed the lead back to Chicago Dog. As the field came down the frontstrech for the checkered flag, Slaw Dog made a slingshot pass to take the victory by less than one length.

| Finish | Grid | No. | Team | Region | Laps |
|---|---|---|---|---|---|
| 1 | 4 | 08 | Slaw Dog (purple) | Southeast | 2 |
| 2 | 2 | 01 | Chicago Dog (yellow) | Midwest | 2 |
| 3 | 5 | 06 | Chili Dog (brown) | South | 2 |
| 4 | 6 | 05 | Seattle Dog (blue) | Northwest | 2 |
| 5 | 1 | 02 | New York Dog (red) | East | 2 |
| 6 | 3 | 04 | Sonoran Dog (green) | Southwest | 2 |

=== Pit Stop Challenge ===
The 46th annual Pit Stop Challenge was scheduled for Friday May 23, after the completion of Carb Day practice. For 2025, the event picked up sponsorship from Oscar Mayer and was officially the "Oscar Mayer $150,000 Pit Stop Challenge" for sponsorship reasons. The bracket for the competition was announced on May 21. Fourteen teams participated in the competition, with two teams – the #5 Arrow McLaren car and the #9 Chip Ganassi Racing car – receiving first-round byes. Team Penske won the competition with Josef Newgarden's crew, defeating fellow Team Penske driver Will Power's crew in a best-of-three final. It was the 20th win for Team Penske in the event and the third for Newgarden, who successfully defended his 2024 victory.

Round 1
15 | Graham Rahal (Rahal Letterman Lanigan) | N/A (Note: Rahal withdrew from the Pit Stop Challenge after the brackets had already been drawn but prior to setting a time in the first round, due to an engine failure during practice earlier in the day.)
76 | Conor Daly (Juncos Hollinger Racing) | 14.106
26 | Colton Herta (Andretti Global) | 11.870
6 | Nolan Siegel (Arrow McLaren) | 15.304
21 | Christian Rasmussen (ECR) | 12.643
2 | Josef Newgarden (Team Penske) | 11.705
18 | Rinus VeeKay (Dale Coyne Racing) | 13.424
10 | Álex Palou (Chip Ganassi Racing) | 12.508
45 | Louis Foster (Rahal Letterman Lanigan) | 12.577
20 | Alexander Rossi (ECR) | 12.197
12 | Will Power (Team Penske) | 11.568
7 | Christian Lundgaard (Arrow McLaren) | 12.820

Quarterfinals
5 | Pato O'Ward (Arrow McLaren) | 11.980
76 | Conor Daly (Juncos Hollinger Racing) | 12.106
26 | Colton Herta (Andretti Global) | 12.545
2 | Josef Newgarden (Team Penske) | 11.098
9 | Scott Dixon (Chip Ganassi Racing)
10 | Álex Palou (Chip Ganassi Racing)
20 | Alexander Rossi (ECR)
12 | Will Power (Team Penske)

Semifinals
5 | Pato O'Ward (Arrow McLaren) | 11.190
2 | Josef Newgarden (Team Penske) | 10.722
9 | Scott Dixon (Chip Ganassi Racing) | 11.318
12 | Will Power (Team Penske) | 11.084

Finals (Best of 3)
2 | Josef Newgarden (Team Penske) | 10.450 | 10.779 | 10.263 | 2
12 | Will Power (Team Penske) | 10.699 | 10.547 | 10.503 | 1

== Starting grid ==
| Row | Inside | | Middle | | Outside | |
|---|---|---|---|---|---|---|
| 1 | 83 | (Israel) Robert Shwartzman R | 75 | (Japan) Takuma Sato W | 5 | (Mexico) Pato O'Ward |
| 2 | 9 | (New Zealand) Scott Dixon W | 60 | (Sweden) Felix Rosenqvist | 10 | (Spain) Álex Palou |
| 3 | 4 | (United States) David Malukas | 7 | (Denmark) Christian Lundgaard | 28 | (Sweden) Marcus Ericsson W |
| 4 | 3 | (New Zealand) Scott McLaughlin | 76 | (United States) Conor Daly | 20 | (United States) Alexander Rossi W |
| 5 | 8 | (Cayman Islands) Kyffin Simpson | 33 | (United States) Ed Carpenter | 14 | (United States) Santino Ferrucci |
| 6 | 30 | (Canada) Devlin DeFrancesco | 77 | (United States) Sting Ray Robb | 21 | (Denmark) Christian Rasmussen |
| 7 | 17 | (United States) Kyle Larson | 45 | (United Kingdom) Louis Foster R | 90 | (United Kingdom) Callum Ilott |
| 8 | 06 | (Brazil) Hélio Castroneves W | 27 | (United States) Kyle Kirkwood | 6 | (United States) Nolan Siegel R |
| 9 | 23 | (United States) Ryan Hunter-Reay W | 24 | (United Kingdom) Jack Harvey | 26 | (United States) Colton Herta |
| 10 | 15 | (United States) Graham Rahal | 98 | (United States) Marco Andretti | 66 | (New Zealand) Marcus Armstrong |
| 11 | 18 | (Netherlands) Rinus VeeKay | 2 | (United States) Josef Newgarden W | 12 | (Australia) Will Power W |

The Team Penske entry of Scott McLaughlin withdrew from Top 12 qualifying due to a practice crash on Sunday morning. He was assigned 10th starting position, based on Saturday times.
The Team Penske entries of Josef Newgarden and Will Power withdrew from the Top 12 qualifying after failing pre-qualifying technical inspection. They were initially assigned starting positions 11th and 12th, based on Saturday times. Following the conclusion of time trials, they were moved to 32nd and 33rd position on the grid, respectively, due to technical infractions.
R Indianapolis 500 rookie
W Indianapolis 500 winner

Failed to qualify

| No. | Driver | Team | Reason |
|---|---|---|---|
| 51 | (United States) Jacob Abel R | Dale Coyne Racing | Fourth fastest in Last Chance Qualifying. Bumped from the field, too slow on final attempt. |

== Race report ==
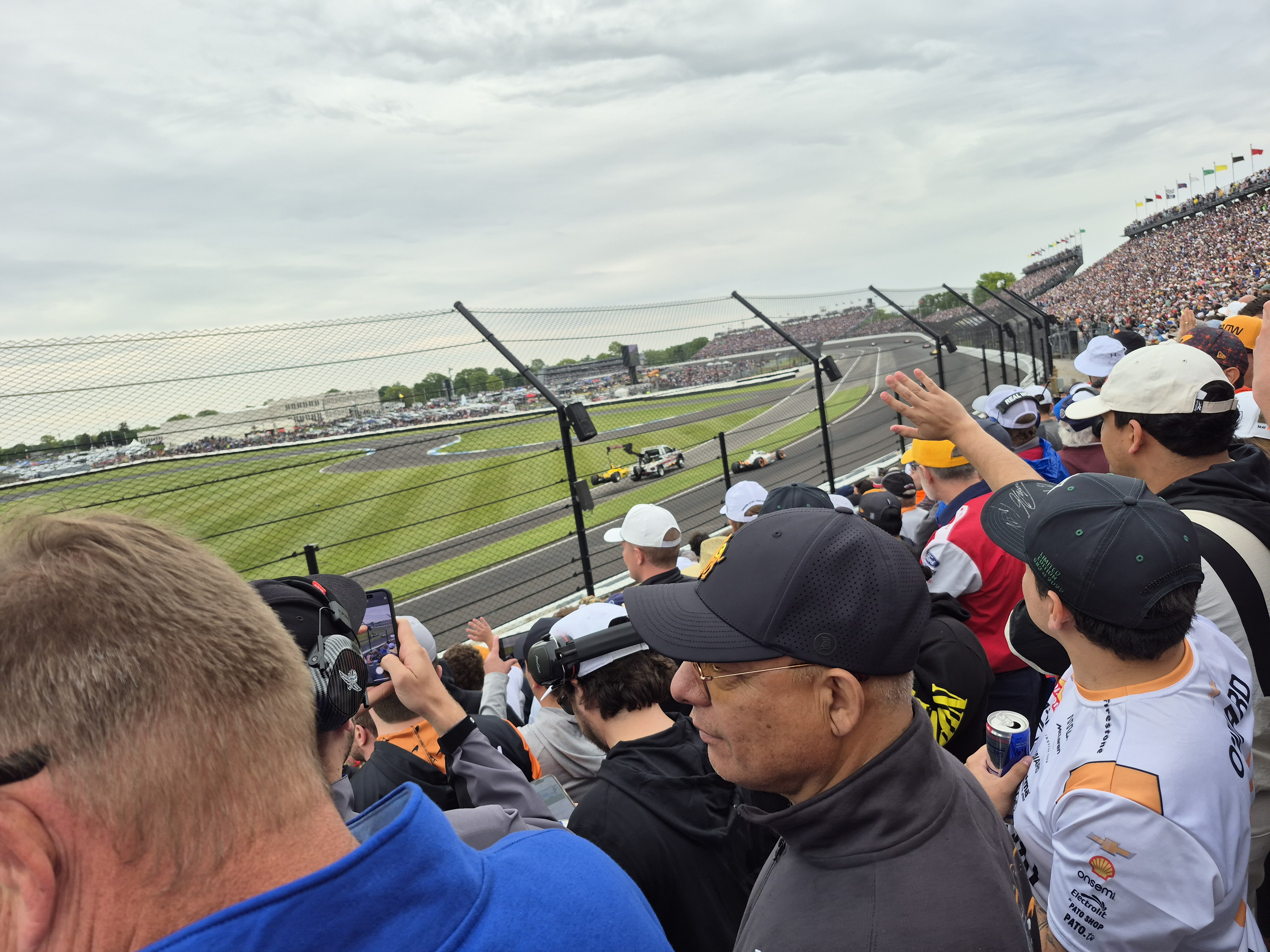
Scott McLaughlin's car being towed away after his crash on the parade laps.

Weather 63 °F (17 °C), Cloudy with brief periods of light rain in the early afternoon.

The race was scheduled to begin at 12:45 p.m. on May 25, but was delayed by roughly 30 minutes due to light rain.

=== First half ===
The start of the race and Marco Andretti's crash in turn 1.

During the parade laps, Scott McLaughlin lost control of his car while attempting to warmup his tires, causing him to crash into the pit wall on the front straight, spin, and come to a rest in turn 1. McLaughlin's race was over before the green flag. Scott Dixon also began to suffer problems during the parade laps, with a fire appearing from the brakes on the left-rear of the car. After McLaughlin's wreck, laps began counting toward the race distance and the race officially began under yellow. The field still lined up for the traditional 3-wide start for the first green flag, officially on lap 4. Polesitter Robert Shwartzman moved into the lead ahead of Pato O'Ward, but further back in the field, Marco Andretti made contact with Jack Harvey, causing Andretti to lose control and impact the outside wall in turn 1.

Racing resumed at lap 8 with Pato O'Ward briefly taking the lead, before being passed by Takuma Sato. Sato remained in the lead until the third caution period came on lap 19, when rain began to fall on the track. During the caution, the majority of the field chose to make pit stops, though some cars, including all ECR cars as well as Rinus VeeKay, chose not to stop and moved to the front of the field. Racing resumed once the rain subsided by lap 29, with Alexander Rossi leading ECR teammate Christian Rasmussen. Rossi and Rasmussen exchanged the lead several times until their pit stops. Once cars that stayed out pitted, Sato retook the lead and remained in the lead through the next cycle of stops, while those on the alternate strategy moved up the order. Rossi, the leading car on the alternate strategy, began to develop problems with an overheating gearbox in the second quarter of the race and the car began trailing smoke. On lap 74, Rossi was forced to pit for repairs. As Rossi shut the car off in his pit stall, the car erupted into flames while several crew members were working on it. Neither Rossi nor any crew members were injured in the fire, but it was the end of the race for his team.

On lap 82, the fourth caution period of the race came, as Rinus VeeKay lost control of his car attempting to enter the pit lane, spun, and hit the inside pit lane wall. VeeKay later indicated that the car had experienced brake failure, which had contributed to him losing control. The subsequent pit stops under the caution created a major shake up in the running order. Takuma Sato, who had led the majority of the race to this point, slid too far forward in his pit box, forcing the crew to drag the car back before starting work. This mistake dropped Sato out of the top 10 positions, and he would not lead the race again. Additionally, polesitter Robert Shwartzman suffered brake failure on his car entering his pit stall, causing him to slide in to his pit wall and collide with three of his pit crew members. One of the crew members suffered an injured foot in the collision. Shwartzman's impact with the pit wall damaged the car, and he was forced to retire from the race. Álex Palou emerged first from those that pitted, with David Malukas behind. Ryan Hunter-Reay moved in to the lead of the race, with Devlin DeFrancesco, Jack Harvey, and Marcus Ericsson close behind on an alternate strategy from the main leaders.

Racing resumed at lap 92, but nearly immediately the caution was out again as Kyle Larson lost control of his car in turn 2 and spun. As he spun, Larson collected the cars of Kyffin Simpson and Sting Ray Robb, sending both of them into spins as well and into the wall. All three drivers retired from the race in the incident. Larson, after doing a routine medical checkup after the accident, immediately left the track to travel to Charlotte to compete in that night's Coca-Cola 600.

=== Second half ===
Hunter-Reay pitted on lap 103, handing the lead to DeFrancesco. An attempted restart was made at lap 106, but as the green flag was shown, Christian Rasmussen made light contact with the wall in the north short chute, sending him into a half spin. Rasmussen was able to save the car with no major damage, but the incident did bring the caution back out for the sixth time in the race. Racing resumed again at lap 109. DeFrancesco maintained the lead, while further back in the field, Conor Daly passed both Palou and Malukas to move to the head of those on the primary strategy. After DeFrancesco pitted on lap 120, Daly moved into the lead of the race. Josef Newgarden, who had started at the rear of the field, also began to appear near the top at this point, running seventh at the 300 mile mark. However, Newgarden's race came to an abrupt end shortly after, when the fuel pump on his car failed after 135 laps, thwarting his attempt to win three "500"s in a row. As those on the main strategy pitted around lap 140, Ryan Hunter-Reay returned to the lead of the race on the alternate strategy. Hunter-Reay maintained a large enough lead that after his next pit stop, he remained the leader and appeared to be in position to challenge for the win. Hunter-Reay's hopes ended on his final pit stop, as he ran out of fuel entering pit lane. With the fuel lines dry, the car would not refire, and Hunter-Reay was forced to retire from the race. At the same time, Conor Daly began to suffer handling problems from a vibration and quickly lost several positions before making a pit stop.

==== Finish ====
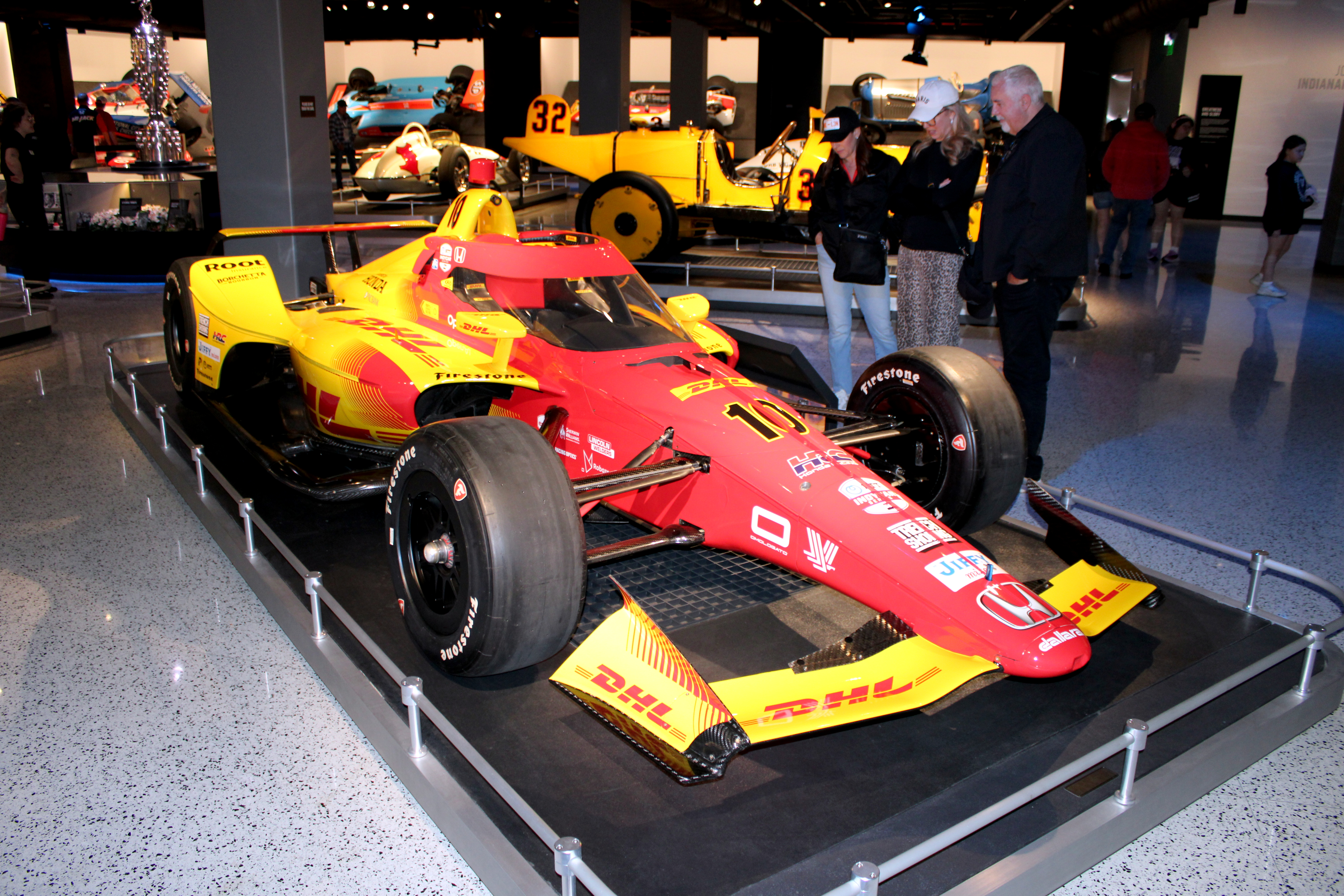
Álex Palou's winning car on display at the Indianapolis Motor Speedway Museum (pictured in 2026)

As those on the main strategy made their final pit stops, David Malukas emerged ahead of Álex Palou, while several on the alternate strategy had yet to pit. Palou then moved ahead of Malukas to become the effective leader on the main strategy. However, once those on the alternate strategy pitted, Marcus Ericsson emerged as the leader of the race, having needed to take less fuel than those on the main strategy. Ericsson was just ahead of Palou and Malukas, but immediately ahead of the leaders were Louis Foster and Devlin DeFrancesco, who were battling to avoid being lapped. The turbulent air generated by these two cars made it difficult for the leaders to pass, helping Ericsson stay in the lead. However, on lap 187, Palou dove to the inside of Ericsson and took the lead in turn 1. The continued presence of the two nearly-lapped cars allowed Palou to maintain the lead for the remainder of the race. Ericsson attempted one final run at Palou through turns 3 and 4 of the last lap, but the seventh and final caution came out as the leaders rounded the final turn as Nolan Siegel lost control of his car and crashed in turn 2. The race officially ended under yellow with Palou as the winner. Ericsson came across the line in second, while Malukas finished third. Pato O'Ward and Felix Rosenqvist rounded out the top five.

Palou became the first Spaniard to take victory in the Indianapolis 500. For his team, Chip Ganassi Racing, it was their sixth victory in the race. Palou's victory also continued a dominant season, as he had now won five out of the six races run to this point for the 2025 Indycar season. For winning, Palou earned $3.8 million from a record purse of $20,283,000. Polesitter Robert Shwartzman was named Rookie of the Year despite his pit lane crash before halfway through the race.

== Post-race penalties ==
On May 26, the day after the race, IndyCar announced that Marcus Ericsson, Kyle Kirkwood, and Callum Ilott's cars had all failed post-race technical inspection and were stripped of their finishing positions. For Ericsson and Kirkwood – teammates at Andretti Global – it was discovered that modifications had been made to the Dallara-supplied Energy Management System (EMS) covers and cover-to-A-arm mounting points with unapproved spacers and parts. Indycar rules stipulated that those parts must be used as supplied and series officials indicated the unapproved parts may have provided an aerodynamic advantage. For Ilott's Prema Racing car, it was found that the front wing failed to meet rules for minimum endplate height and location. All three entries were moved to the rear of the finishing field, fined $100,000 each, and had their respective team managers suspended for the following race at Detroit.

The post-race penalties elevated David Malukas to second place, Pato O'Ward to third, Felix Rosenqvist to fourth, and Santino Ferrucci to fifth.

== Box score ==
- Note: This is reflective of the final published results by IndyCar the morning after the race was run which includes post-race penalties

| Finish | No. | Driver | Team | Chassis | Engine | Laps | Status | Pit Stops | Grid | Pts.^{1} |
|---|---|---|---|---|---|---|---|---|---|---|
| 1 | 10 | (Spain) Álex Palou | Chip Ganassi Racing | Dallara UAK18 | Honda | 200 | 168.883 mph | 5 | 6 | 58 |
| 2 | 4 | (United States) David Malukas | A. J. Foyt Racing | Dallara UAK18 | Chevrolet | 200 | +1.1426 | 5 | 7 | 47 |
| 3 | 5 | (Mexico) Pato O'Ward | Arrow McLaren | Dallara UAK18 | Chevrolet | 200 | +2.1327 | 5 | 3 | 46 |
| 4 | 60 | (Sweden) Felix Rosenqvist | Meyer Shank Racing | Dallara UAK18 | Honda | 200 | +2.9464 | 5 | 5 | 40 |
| 5 | 14 | (United States) Santino Ferrucci | A. J. Foyt Racing | Dallara UAK18 | Chevrolet | 200 | +4.9902 | 5 | 15 | 30 |
| 6 | 21 | (Denmark) Christian Rasmussen | ECR | Dallara UAK18 | Chevrolet | 200 | +6.0274 | 5 | 18 | 29 |
| 7 | 7 | (Denmark) Christian Lundgaard | Arrow McLaren | Dallara UAK18 | Chevrolet | 200 | +9.2592 | 6 | 8 | 31 |
| 8 | 76 | (United States) Conor Daly | Juncos Hollinger Racing | Dallara UAK18 | Chevrolet | 200 | +13.3125 | 5 | 11 | 25 |
| 9 | 75 | (Japan) Takuma Sato W | Rahal Letterman Lanigan Racing | Dallara UAK18 | Honda | 200 | +16.9157 | 5 | 2 | 36 |
| 10 | 06 | (Brazil) Hélio Castroneves W | Meyer Shank Racing | Dallara UAK18 | Honda | 200 | +59.6118 | 5 | 22 | 20 |
| 11 | 30 | (Canada) Devlin DeFrancesco | Rahal Letterman Lanigan Racing | Dallara UAK18 | Honda | 200 | +1:02.1039 | 5 | 16 | 20 |
| 12 | 45 | (United Kingdom) Louis Foster R | Rahal Letterman Lanigan Racing | Dallara UAK18 | Honda | 200 | +1:03.0004 | 5 | 20 | 18 |
| 13 | 6 | (United States) Nolan Siegel R | Arrow McLaren | Dallara UAK18 | Chevrolet | 199 | Contact | 5 | 24 | 17 |
| 14 | 26 | (United States) Colton Herta | Andretti Global | Dallara UAK18 | Honda | 199 | -1 Lap | 5 | 27 | 16 |
| 15 | 33 | (United States) Ed Carpenter | ECR | Dallara UAK18 | Chevrolet | 199 | -1 Lap | 5 | 14 | 16 |
| 16 | 12 | (Australia) Will Power W | Team Penske | Dallara UAK18 | Chevrolet | 199 | -1 Lap | 6 | 33 | 14 |
| 17 | 15 | (United States) Graham Rahal | Rahal Letterman Lanigan Racing | Dallara UAK18 | Honda | 199 | -1 Lap | 6 | 28 | 13 |
| 18 | 66 | (New Zealand) Marcus Armstrong | Meyer Shank Racing | Dallara UAK18 | Honda | 198 | -2 Laps | 5 | 30 | 12 |
| 19 | 24 | (United Kingdom) Jack Harvey | DRR-Cusick Motorsports | Dallara UAK18 | Chevrolet | 198 | -2 Laps | 5 | 26 | 12 |
| 20 | 9 | (New Zealand) Scott Dixon W | Chip Ganassi Racing | Dallara UAK18 | Honda | 197 | -3 Laps | 6 | 4 | 19 |
| 21 | 23 | (United States) Ryan Hunter-Reay W | DRR-Cusick Motorsports | Dallara UAK18 | Chevrolet | 171 | Mechanical | 6 | 25 | 10 |
| 22 | 2 | (United States) Josef Newgarden W | Team Penske | Dallara UAK18 | Chevrolet | 135 | Mechanical | 6 | 32 | 8 |
| 23 | 77 | (United States) Sting Ray Robb | Juncos Hollinger Racing | Dallara UAK18 | Chevrolet | 91 | Contact | 3 | 17 | 7 |
| 24 | 17 | (United States) Kyle Larson | Arrow McLaren with Rick Hendrick | Dallara UAK18 | Chevrolet | 91 | Contact | 3 | 19 | 6 |
| 25 | 8 | (Cayman Islands) Kyffin Simpson | Chip Ganassi Racing | Dallara UAK18 | Honda | 91 | Contact | 3 | 13 | 5 |
| 26 | 83 | (Israel) Robert Shwartzman R | Prema Racing | Dallara UAK18 | Chevrolet | 87 | Contact | 2 | 1 | 18 |
| 27 | 18 | (Netherlands) Rinus VeeKay | Dale Coyne Racing | Dallara UAK18 | Honda | 81 | Contact | 2 | 31 | 5 |
| 28 | 20 | (United States) Alexander Rossi W | ECR | Dallara UAK18 | Chevrolet | 73 | Mechanical | 1 | 12 | 6 |
| 29 | 98 | (United States) Marco Andretti | Andretti Global | Dallara UAK18 | Honda | 4 | Contact | 0 | 29 | 5 |
| 30 | 3 | (New Zealand) Scott McLaughlin | Team Penske | Dallara UAK18 | Chevrolet | 0 | Contact | 0 | 10 | 8 |
| 31 | 28 | (Sweden) Marcus Ericsson W | Andretti Global | Dallara UAK18 | Honda | 200 | Disqualified, Hybrid system^{2} | 5 | 9 | 9 |
| 32 | 27 | (United States) Kyle Kirkwood | Andretti Global | Dallara UAK18 | Honda | 200 | Disqualified, Hybrid system^{3} | 5 | 23 | 5 |
| 33 | 90 | (United Kingdom) Callum Ilott | Prema Racing | Dallara UAK18 | Chevrolet | 200 | Disqualified, Wing endplate^{4} | 5 | 21 | 5 |
Box Score

W Former Indianapolis 500 winner

R Indianapolis 500 Rookie

All entrants utilized Firestone tires.

- ^{1} Points include qualification points from time trials, 1 point for leading a lap, and 2 points for most laps led.
- ^{2} Marcus Ericsson finished second on track, but was moved beneath the finishing order of all technically compliant entries after failing technical inspection for using unapproved parts on the hybrid system cover.
- ^{3} Kyle Kirkwood finished sixth on track, but was moved beneath the finishing order of all technically compliant entries after failing technical inspection for using unapproved parts on the hybrid system cover.
- ^{4} Callum Ilott finished twelfth on track, but was moved beneath the finishing order of all technically compliant entries after failing technical inspection after his front wing was found to not be in compliance for minimum wing endplate height and location requirements.

=== Race statistics ===
Lap Leaders
| Laps | Leader |
|---|---|
| 1–8 | Robert Shwartzman |
| 9–10 | Pato O'Ward |
| 11–23 | Takuma Sato |
| 24–29 | Alexander Rossi |
| 30–32 | Christian Rasmussen |
| 33–36 | Alexander Rossi |
| 37–38 | Christian Rasmussen |
| 39–42 | Alexander Rossi |
| 43 | Ed Carpenter |
| 44–46 | Jack Harvey |
| 47–60 | Takuma Sato |
| 61–62 | Kyle Kirkwood |
| 63–86 | Takuma Sato |
| 87–102 | Ryan Hunter-Reay |
| 103–119 | Devlin DeFrancesco |
| 120–132 | Conor Daly |
| 133 | David Malukas |
| 134–139 | Ryan Hunter-Reay |
| 140–142 | Christian Rasmussen |
| 143–168 | Ryan Hunter-Reay |
| 169 | David Malukas |
| 170–186 | Marcus Ericsson |
| 187–200 | Álex Palou |

Total laps led
| Driver | Laps |
|---|---|
| Takuma Sato | 51 |
| Ryan Hunter-Reay | 48 |
| Marcus Ericsson | 17 |
| Devlin DeFrancesco | 17 |
| Álex Palou | 14 |
| Alexander Rossi | 14 |
| Conor Daly | 13 |
| Christian Rasmussen | 8 |
| Robert Shwartzman | 8 |
| Jack Harvey | 3 |
| David Malukas | 2 |
| Pato O'Ward | 2 |
| Kyle Kirkwood | 2 |
| Ed Carpenter | 1 |

Cautions: 7 for 45 laps
| Laps | Reason |
|---|---|
| 1–3 | McLaughlin crash in turn 1 |
| 5–8 | Andretti crash in turn 1 |
| 19–29 | Conditions |
| 82–90 | VeeKay crash at pit entrance |
| 92–105 | Larson, Robb, and Simpson crash in turn 2 |
| 106–108 | Rasmussen spin in north short chute |
| 200 | Siegel crash in turn 2 |

== Aftermath ==
In the wake of the numerous technical violations found throughout the month, the IndyCar series began the process of major overhauls to its officiating system. IndyCar first announced that they would work toward the creation of an officiating body independent of the series or Penske Entertainment and with no Penske employees. IndyCar had served as its own officiating body since dismissing USAC midway through the 1996–97 season. Conflict of interest concerns were raised by team owners and media members after Roger Penske purchased the series in 2020 while still fielding a team, which came to a head after Team Penske's attenuator violations during qualifying, marking the second season in a row that Penske's team had been found with major rules violations. Some rumors were reported that Honda threatened to end their involvement with IndyCar if the series did not move toward independent officiating due to the Penske technical violations, though Penske Entertainment and the Indycar series declined to comment on the topic. The series announced a week after the race that they were targeting to have the new officiating body ready for the 2026 season. The new body, titled IndyCar Officiating Inc., was unveiled in December. The new three-member panel for officiating consists of two members appointed by vote from IndyCar team owners, and the third member being appointed by the FIA.

Further updates to IndyCar's officating process were discussed after the race. The series announced that they were working towards implementing a scanning process during pre-race and post-race technical inspections to assist with catching technical violations. The announcement came after it was realized that Team Penske's attenuator violations had been missed during technical inspection for at least a full year, including at the 2024 Indianapolis 500. Four teams – Chip Ganassi Racing, A. J. Foyt Racing, Arrow McLaren, and Andretti Global – provided their Indianapolis 500 cars for IndyCar to do verification scans for baseline data for the scanning system. The series also noted that they intended to do more verification scans for other races in the 2025 season.

After sweeping both the Sonsio Grand Prix and the Indianapolis 500, Álex Palou left Indy with a 112-point lead in the championship standings. Palou went on to win three more races (eight total) and clinched the 2025 IndyCar Series championship with two races remaining. It was his third straight title, and fourth overall. Team Penske, after a dismal month of May, notched only two victories all season. Towards the end of the season, attention focused particularly on Will Power, who would ultimately part ways with Penske at season's end after 17 years with the team.

== Broadcasting ==
=== Television ===
The race was televised live by Fox for the first time, as the network took over from NBC, who had been the television broadcaster since 2019. On January 14, 2025, Fox announced their primary broadcast team for the full IndyCar season, with Will Buxton serving as lead commentator and James Hinchcliffe and Townsend Bell retaining their analyst roles they had previously held with NBC. Fox Sports SVP of technical operations Mike Davies stated that the network was treating the race as "the Super Bowl of racing" (and, in effect, its "second" Super Bowl of 2025 after having broadcast Super Bowl LIX in February), and would place an emphasis on "storytelling" and technology (including 115 cameras and 108 microphones, six "driver's eye" cameras, drone cameras, and a "Rovercam" on Gasoline Alley).

An extended pre-race show was hosted by Chris Myers, joined by former drivers Tony Stewart and Danica Patrick as analysts. It featured reports by Fox Sports contributors Tom Rinaldi and Erin Andrews, and guest appearances by NFL on Fox personalities Tom Brady, Rob Gronkowski, and Michael Strahan. Kevin Lee and Georgia Henneberry served as pit reporters, joined by NASCAR on Fox pit reporter Jamie Little as a fill-in for Jack Harvey (who was participating in the 500 and served as an in-race contributor instead). Fox Deportes carried a Spanish-language broadcast, with Tony Rivera as lead commentator, Jessi Losada and former IndyCar driver Oriol Servià as analysts, and Giselle Zarur as pit reporter.

On May 16, 2025, IMS announced that due to an anticipated sellout of grandstand tickets, the traditional blackout in the Indianapolis media market would be lifted. Therefore, local Fox affiliate WXIN carried the live telecast; this was the fifth time the blackout had been lifted since live flag-to-flag coverage began in 1986.

Fox reported a viewership of roughly 7.05 million for their coverage, making it the most viewed Indianapolis 500 since 2008. The viewership was also reported as a 40% increase from the 2024 race.

Fox's coverage faced criticism from viewers for multiple aspects of its production, including a large number of commercial breaks (which, in some cases, caused the coverage to miss notable moments of the race; unlike previous IndyCar rightsholders, Fox has not used a side-by-side format for commercial breaks during green flag racing), and cutting away from Palou crossing the finish line to cover a final lap crash by Nolan Siegel that had no bearing on the final results.

Fox
| Booth announcers | Pre/Post-race | Pit reporters |
|---|---|---|
| Announcer: Will Buxton; Color: Townsend Bell; Color: James Hinchcliffe; Live in-car reports: Jack Harvey | Host: Chris Myers; Analyst: Tony Stewart; Analyst: Danica Patrick; Features: Tom Rinaldi; Features: Erin Andrews | Georgia Henneberry; Kevin Lee; Jamie Little |

=== Radio ===
The race was broadcast by the Indianapolis Motor Speedway Radio Network. The chief announcer was Mark Jaynes. It was his tenth year as chief announcer, and 30th year overall with the network. Anders Krohn served as driver analyst on Carb Day and during the race, while Zach Veach served as driver analyst during time trials. Normal IMS Radio series driver analyst Davey Hamilton was absent, serving instead as race strategist for Jack Harvey at Dreyer & Reinbold Racing. However, Hamilton did return for the Detroit race the following weekend. Chris Denari called his 26th and final 500 from turn 4 as he retired from the crew following the race.

IMS Radio Network
| Booth Announcers | Turn Reporters | Pit/garage reporters |
|---|---|---|
| Chief Announcer: Mark Jaynes; Driver analyst: Anders Krohn (Carb Day & race day); Driver analyst: Zach Veach (time trials) | Turn 1: Nick Yeoman; Turn 2: Michael Young; Turn 3: Jake Query; Turn 4: Chris Denari | Alex Wollf; Rob Blackman; Ryan Myrehn; Rich Nye |

== Notes ==
| Previous race: 2025 Sonsio Grand Prix | IndyCar Series; 2025 season | Next race: 2025 Chevrolet Detroit Grand Prix |
| Previous race: 2024 Indianapolis 500 | Indianapolis 500 | Next race: 2026 Indianapolis 500 |
