= 2025 Sonsio Grand Prix =

Indycar race held in Speedway, Indiana

(United States) 2025 Sonsio Grand Prix
Race details
5th round of the 2025 IndyCar season
← Previous race	Next race →
- Layout of the Indianapolis Motor Speedway Road Course
- Date: May 10, 2025
- Official name: Sonsio Grand Prix
- Location: Indianapolis Motor Speedway, Speedway, Indiana
- Course: Permanent road course 2.439 mi / 3.925 km
- Distance: 85 laps 207.315 mi / 333.641 km

Pole position
- Driver: (Spain) Álex Palou (Chip Ganassi Racing)
- Time: 01:09.3417

Fastest lap
- Driver: (Spain) Álex Palou (Chip Ganassi Racing)
- Time: 1:19.2353 (on lap 74 of 85)

Podium
- First: (Spain) Álex Palou (Chip Ganassi Racing)
- Second: (Mexico) Pato O'Ward (Arrow McLaren)
- Third: (Australia) Will Power (Team Penske)

Chronology
Previous	Next
2024	2026

The 2025 Sonsio Grand Prix was the fifth round of the 2025 IndyCar season. The race was held on May 10, 2025, in Speedway, Indiana at the Indianapolis Motor Speedway Road Course. The race was contested of 85 laps. Álex Palou won the race, Pato O'Ward finished 2nd, and Will Power finished 3rd. Scott McLaughlin and Scott Dixon rounded out the top five, while Graham Rahal, Marcus Armstrong, Kyle Kirkwood, Rinus VeeKay, and Felix Rosenqvist rounded out the top ten.

== Entry list ==
Key	Meaning
R	Rookie
W	Past winner

No.	Driver	Team	Engine
2	(United States) Josef Newgarden W	Team Penske	Chevrolet
3	(New Zealand) Scott McLaughlin	Team Penske	Chevrolet
4	(United States) David Malukas	A. J. Foyt Racing	Chevrolet
5	(Mexico) Pato O'Ward	Arrow McLaren	Chevrolet
6	(United States) Nolan Siegel R	Arrow McLaren	Chevrolet
7	(Denmark) Christian Lundgaard	Arrow McLaren	Chevrolet
8	(Cayman Islands) Kyffin Simpson	Chip Ganassi Racing	Honda
9	(New Zealand) Scott Dixon W	Chip Ganassi Racing	Honda
10	(Spain) Álex Palou W	Chip Ganassi Racing	Honda
12	(Australia) Will Power W	Team Penske	Chevrolet
14	(United States) Santino Ferrucci	A. J. Foyt Racing	Chevrolet
15	(United States) Graham Rahal	Rahal Letterman Lanigan Racing	Honda
18	(Netherlands) Rinus VeeKay W	Dale Coyne Racing	Honda
20	(United States) Alexander Rossi W	ECR	Chevrolet
21	(Denmark) Christian Rasmussen	ECR	Chevrolet
26	(United States) Colton Herta W	Andretti Global with Curb-Agajanian	Honda
27	(United States) Kyle Kirkwood	Andretti Global	Honda
28	(Sweden) Marcus Ericsson	Andretti Global	Honda
30	(Canada) Devlin DeFrancesco	Rahal Letterman Lanigan Racing	Honda
45	(United Kingdom) Louis Foster R	Rahal Letterman Lanigan Racing	Honda
51	(United States) Jacob Abel R	Dale Coyne Racing	Honda
60	(Sweden) Felix Rosenqvist	Meyer Shank Racing	Honda
66	(New Zealand) Marcus Armstrong	Meyer Shank Racing	Honda
76	(United States) Conor Daly	Juncos Hollinger Racing	Chevrolet
77	(United States) Sting Ray Robb	Juncos Hollinger Racing	Chevrolet
83	(Israel) Robert Shwartzman R	Prema Racing	Chevrolet
90	(United Kingdom) Callum Ilott	Prema Racing	Chevrolet

== Practice ==
=== Practice 1 ===
Top Practice Speeds
Pos	No.	Driver	Team	Engine	Lap Time
1	10	(Spain) Álex Palou W	Chip Ganassi Racing	Honda	01:09.9790
2	8	(Cayman Islands) Kyffin Simpson	Chip Ganassi Racing	Honda	01:10.0677
3	45	(United Kingdom) Louis Foster R	Rahal Letterman Lanigan Racing	Honda	01:10.1235
Practice 1 results

=== Practice 2 ===
Top Practice Speeds
Pos	No.	Driver	Team	Engine	Lap Time
1	15	(United States) Graham Rahal	Rahal Letterman Lanigan Racing	Honda	01:09.7242
2	45	(United Kingdom) Louis Foster R	Rahal Letterman Lanigan Racing	Honda	01:09.8626
3	30	(Canada) Devlin DeFrancesco	Rahal Letterman Lanigan Racing	Honda	01:10.0690
Practice 2 results

== Qualifying ==
Qualifying was held at 4:30 PM ET on May 9, 2025.

=== Qualifying classification ===
Pos	No.	Driver	Team	Engine	Time	Final grid							
Pos	No.	Driver	Team	Engine	Time	Final grid	1	10	(Spain) Álex Palou W	Chip Ganassi Racing	Honda	01:09.3417	1
Pos	No.	Driver	Team	Engine	2	Final grid	15	(United States) Graham Rahal	Rahal Letterman Lanigan Racing	Honda	01.09.7516	2	
3	45	(United Kingdom) Louis Foster R	Rahal Letterman Lanigan Racing	Honda	01.09.8801	3							
4	3	(Australia) Scott McLaughlin	Team Penske	Chevrolet	01.09.8910	4							
5	30	(Canada) Devlin DeFrancesco	Rahal Letterman Lanigan Racing	Honda	01.09.9432	5							
6	2	(United States) Josef Newgarden W	Team Penske	Chevrolet	01.09.9829	6							
7	12	(Australia) Will Power W	Team Penske	Chevrolet	01:09.9973	7							
8	5	(Mexico) Pato O'Ward	Arrow McLaren	Chevrolet	01:10.0083	8							
9	20	(United States) Alexander Rossi W	Ed Carpenter Racing	Chevrolet	01:10.0684	9							
10	8	(Cayman Islands) Kyffin Simpson	Chip Ganassi Racing	Honda	01:10.1423	10							
11	14	(United States) Santino Ferrucci	A.J. Foyt Racing	Chevrolet	01:10.1736	11							
12	60	(Sweden) Felix Rosenqvist	Meyer Shank Racing	Honda	01:11.4104	12							
13	26	(United States) Colton Herta W	Andretti Global with Curb-Agajanian	Honda	01:10.2231	13							
14	7	(Denmark) Christian Lundgaard	Arrow McLaren	Chevrolet	01:10.0949	14							
15	66	(Australia) Marcus Armstrong	Meyer Shank Racing	Honda	01:10.2303	15							
16	9	(New Zealand) Scott Dixon W	Chip Ganassi Racing	Honda	01:10.1158	16							
17	77	(United States) Sting Ray Robb	Juncos Hollinger Racing	Chevrolet	01:10.2339	17							
18	6	(United States) Nolan Siegel R	Arrow McLaren	Chevrolet	01:10.1178	18							
19	21	(United States) Christian Rasmussen	Ed Carpenter Racing	Chevrolet	01:10.2543	19							
20	28	(Sweden) Marcus Ericsson	Andretti Global	Honda	01:10.1307	20							
21	27	(United States) Kyle Kirkwood	Andretti Global	Honda	01:10.2554	21							
22	76	(United States) Conor Daly	Juncos Hollinger Racing	Chevrolet	01:10.4295	22							
23	90	(United Kingdom) Callum Ilott	Prema Racing	Chevrolet	01:10.2784	23							
24	18	(Netherlands) Rinus Veekay W	Dale Coyne Racing	Honda	01:10.5208	24							
25	51	(United States) Jacob Abel R	Dale Coyne Racing	Honda	01:10.6609	25							
26	4	(United States) David Malukas	A.J. Foyt Racing	Chevrolet	01:10.6039	26							
27	83	(Israel) Robert Shwartzman R	Prema Racing	Chevrolet	01:11.1172	27							
Full qualifying results

Notes

- **Bold text** indicates fastest time.

== Warmup ==
Top Practice Speeds
Pos	No.	Driver	Team	Engine	Lap Time
1	2	(United States) Josef Newgarden W	Team Penske	Chevrolet	01:10.5606
2	7	(Denmark) Christian Lundgaard	Arrow McLaren	Chevrolet	01:10.6477
3	9	(New Zealand) Scott Dixon W	Chip Ganassi Racing	Honda	01:10.8647
Official warmup results

== Race ==
The race was held at 4:30 PM ET on May 10, 2025.

=== Race classification ===
Pos	No.	Driver	Team	Engine	Laps	Time/Retired	Pit Stops	Grid	Laps Led	Pts.
1	10	(Spain) Álex Palou W	Chip Ganassi Racing	Honda	85	01:48:00.6615	3	1	29	52
2	5	(Mexico) Pato O'Ward	Arrow McLaren	Chevrolet	85	01:48:06.1455	3	8	0	40
3	12	(Australia) Will Power W	Team Penske	Chevrolet	85	01:48:09.1144	3	7	0	35
4	3	(New Zealand) Scott McLaughlin	Team Penske	Chevrolet	85	01:48:11.2006	3	4	0	32
5	9	(New Zealand) Scott Dixon W	Chip Ganassi Racing	Honda	85	01:48:11.9260	3	16	0	30
6	15	(United States) Graham Rahal	Rahal Letterman Lanigan Racing	Honda	85	01:48:19.7375	3	2	49	31
7	66	(New Zealand) Marcus Armstrong	Meyer Shank Racing	Honda	85	01:48:20.6259	3	15	6	27
8	27	(United States) Kyle Kirkwood	Andretti Global	Honda	85	01:48:22.6573	3	21	0	24
9	18	(Netherlands) Rinus VeeKay W	Dale Coyne Racing	Honda	85	01:48:23.2759	3	24	0	22
10	60	(Sweden) Felix Rosenqvist	Meyer Shank Racing	Honda	85	01:48:23.8928	3	12	0	20
11	45	(United Kingdom) Louis Foster R	Rahal Letterman Lanigan Racing	Honda	85	01:48:26.7891	3	3	0	19
12	2	(United States) Josef Newgarden W	Team Penske	Chevrolet	85	01:48:27.1373	3	6	0	18
13	6	(United States) Nolan Siegel R	Arrow McLaren	Chevrolet	85	01:48:27.3851	3	18	0	17
14	20	(United States) Alexander Rossi W	ECR	Chevrolet	85	01:48:28.4366	3	9	0	16
15	76	(United States) Conor Daly	Juncos Hollinger Racing	Chevrolet	85	01:48:31.5049	3	22	0	15
16	7	(Denmark) Christian Lundgaard	Arrow McLaren	Chevrolet	85	01:48:31.7029	3	7	0	14
17	30	(Canada) Devlin DeFrancesco	Rahal Letterman Lanigan Racing	Honda	85	01:48:32.9423	3	5	1	14
18	83	(Israel) Robert Shwartzman R	Prema Racing	Chevrolet	85	01:48:33.7658	3	27	0	12
19	21	(Denmark) Christian Rasmussen	ECR	Chevrolet	85	01:48:34.1135	3	19	0	11
20	14	(United States) Santino Ferrucci	A. J. Foyt Racing	Chevrolet	85	01:48:35.0540	4	11	0	10
21	77	(United States) Sting Ray Robb	Juncos Hollinger Racing	Chevrolet	85	01:48:35.4159	3	17	0	9
22	90	(United Kingdom) Callum Ilott	Prema Racing	Chevrolet	79	01:48:36.2002	5	23	0	8
23	4	(United States) David Malukas	A. J. Foyt Racing	Chevrolet	68	Power Loss	3	26	0	7
24	51	(United States) Jacob Abel R	Dale Coyne Racing	Honda	67	01:25:18.8044	3	25	0	6
25	26	(United States) Colton Herta W	Andretti Global with Curb-Agajanian	Honda	64	01:23:27.9125	4	13	0	5
26	28	(Sweden) Marcus Ericsson	Andretti Global	Honda	6	Mechanical	0	20	0	5
27	8	(Cayman Islands) Kyffin Simpson	Chip Ganassi Racing	Honda	0	00:00:00.0000	0	10	0	5
Fastest lap: (Spain) Álex Palou (Chip Ganassi Racing) - 1:19.2353 (lap 4)
Official race results

== Championship standings after the race ==
Drivers' Championship standings

	Pos.	Driver	Points
Unchanged	1	(Spain) Álex Palou	248
	2	(United States) Kyle Kirkwood	151 (–97)
	3	(Denmark) Christian Lundgaard	150 (–98)
	4	(Mexico) Pato O'Ward	148 (–100)
	5	(New Zealand) Scott McLaughlin	137 (–111)

Engine manufacturer standings

	Pos.	Manufacturer	Points
Unchanged	1	Honda	452
Unchanged	2	Chevrolet	359 (–93)

- Note: Only the top five positions are included.

Previous race: 2025 Children's of Alabama Indy Grand Prix	IndyCar Series; 2025 season	Next race: 2025 Indianapolis 500
Previous race: 2024 Sonsio Grand Prix	Grand Prix of Indianapolis	Next race: 2026 Sonsio Grand Prix
