= 2023 Big Machine Music City Grand Prix =

Indycar race held in Nashville, Tennessee

(United States) 2023 Big Machine Music City Grand Prix
Race details
13th round of the 2023 IndyCar season
← Previous race	Next race →
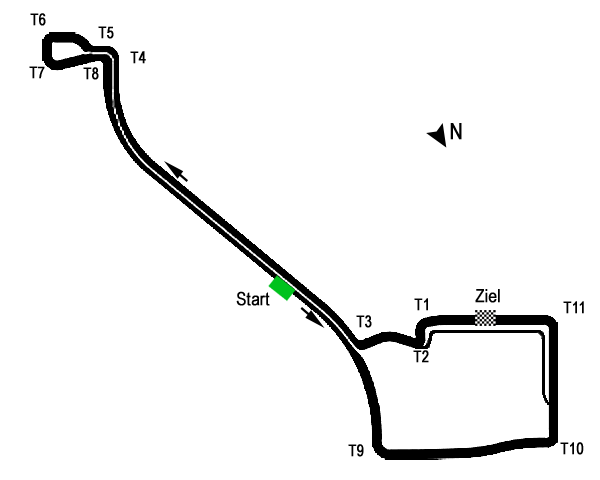
- Layout of the Nashville Street Circuit
- Date: August 6, 2023
- Official name: Big Machine Music City Grand Prix
- Location: Nashville Street Circuit, Nashville, Tennessee
- Course: Temporary street circuit 2.100 mi / 3.380 km
- Distance: 80 laps 168.00 mi / 270.37 km

Pole position
- Driver: (New Zealand) Scott McLaughlin (Team Penske)
- Time: 01:14.6099

Fastest lap
- Driver: (Sweden) Linus Lundqvist (Meyer Shank Racing)
- Time: 01:16.7115 (on lap 57 of 80)

Podium
- First: (United States) Kyle Kirkwood (Andretti Autosport)
- Second: (New Zealand) Scott McLaughlin (Team Penske)
- Third: (Spain) Álex Palou (Chip Ganassi Racing)

Chronology
Previous	Next
2022	2024

The 2023 Big Machine Music City Grand Prix was the thirteenth round of the 2023 IndyCar season. The race was held on August 6, 2023, in Nashville, Tennessee at the Nashville Street Circuit. The eleventh edition of INDYCAR in Nashville consisted of 80 laps and was won by Kyle Kirkwood.

The race was accompanied by the Wesley Mortgage Freedom Friday Tribute Concert, on Friday, August 4, featuring Brian Kelley (from Florida Georgia Line), Chris Janson, Vince Neil (from Mötley Crüe), Gavin DeGraw, Sixwire, and others. Concerts by Frank Ray, Dillon Carmichael, and Flo Rida were also announced. On Sunday, August 6, Jay DeMarcus, Jason Crabb, and others performed, presented by Red Street Records.

On February 14, 2024, it was announced because of construction issues with the new Tennessee Titans stadium and the Broadway region issues with closing streets for the race, the Nashville Street Circuit race will be discontinued. It will be replaced by Gladeville's Nashville Superspeedway for the first time since 2008.

== Entry list ==
Key	Meaning
R	Rookie
W	Past winner

No.	Driver	Team	Engine
2	(United States) Josef Newgarden	Team Penske	Chevrolet
3	(New Zealand) Scott McLaughlin	Team Penske	Chevrolet
5	(Mexico) Pato O'Ward	Arrow McLaren	Chevrolet
06	(Brazil) Hélio Castroneves	Meyer Shank Racing	Honda
6	(Sweden) Felix Rosenqvist	Arrow McLaren	Chevrolet
7	(United States) Alexander Rossi	Arrow McLaren	Chevrolet
8	(Sweden) Marcus Ericsson W	Chip Ganassi Racing	Honda
9	(New Zealand) Scott Dixon W	Chip Ganassi Racing	Honda
10	(Spain) Álex Palou	Chip Ganassi Racing	Honda
11	(New Zealand) Marcus Armstrong R	Chip Ganassi Racing	Honda
12	(Australia) Will Power	Team Penske	Chevrolet
14	(United States) Santino Ferrucci	A. J. Foyt Enterprises	Chevrolet
15	(United States) Graham Rahal	Rahal Letterman Lanigan Racing	Honda
18	(United States) David Malukas	Dale Coyne Racing with HMD Motorsports	Honda
20	(United States) Ryan Hunter-Reay	Ed Carpenter Racing	Chevrolet
21	(Netherlands) Rinus VeeKay	Ed Carpenter Racing	Chevrolet
26	(United States) Colton Herta	Andretti Autosport with Curb-Agajanian	Honda
27	(United States) Kyle Kirkwood	Andretti Autosport	Honda
28	(France) Romain Grosjean	Andretti Autosport	Honda
29	(Canada) Devlin DeFrancesco	Andretti Steinbrenner Autosport	Honda
30	(United Kingdom) Jack Harvey	Rahal Letterman Lanigan Racing	Honda
45	(Denmark) Christian Lundgaard	Rahal Letterman Lanigan Racing	Honda
51	(United States) Sting Ray Robb R	Dale Coyne Racing with Rick Ware Racing	Honda
55	(Denmark) Benjamin Pedersen R	A. J. Foyt Enterprises	Chevrolet
60	(Sweden) Linus Lundqvist R	Meyer Shank Racing	Honda
77	(United Kingdom) Callum Ilott	Juncos Hollinger Racing	Chevrolet
78	(Argentina) Agustín Canapino R	Juncos Hollinger Racing	Chevrolet

== Practice ==
=== Practice 1 ===
Top Practice Speeds
Pos	No.	Driver	Team	Engine	Lap Time
1	12	(Australia) Will Power	Team Penske	Chevrolet	01:16.4042
2	10	(Spain) Álex Palou	Chip Ganassi Racing	Honda	01:16.6494
3	7	(United States) Alexander Rossi	Arrow McLaren	Chevrolet	01:16.7192

=== Practice 2 ===
Due to rain delaying the start time of practice 2, the session was shortened to 30 minutes, from the usual 45 minutes.

Top Practice Speeds
Pos	No.	Driver	Team	Engine	Lap Time
1	8	(Sweden) Marcus Ericsson W	Chip Ganassi Racing	Honda	01:31.7999
2	21	(Netherlands) Rinus VeeKay	Ed Carpenter Racing	Chevrolet	01:32.6910
3	12	(Australia) Will Power	Team Penske	Chevrolet	01:32.8167

== Qualifying ==
Due to rain causing track conditions to worsen, qualifying was moved to start at 6:15 PM ET.

=== Qualifying classification ===
Pos	No.	Driver	Team	Engine	Time				Final grid
Pos	No.	Driver	Team	Engine	Round 1		Round 2	Round 3	Final grid
Pos	No.	Driver	Team	Engine	Group 1	Group 2	Round 2	Round 3	Final grid
1	3	(New Zealand) Scott McLaughlin	Team Penske	Chevrolet	**01:15.1629**	N/A	01:14.7484	**01:14.6099**	1
2	5	(Mexico) Pato O'Ward	Arrow McLaren	Chevrolet	N/A	01:15.1251	**01:14.5944**	01:14.9395	2
3	26	(United States) Colton Herta	Andretti Autosport with Curb-Agajanian	Honda	N/A	**01:15.0030**	01:14.7128	01:15.2416	3
4	10	(Spain) Álex Palou	Chip Ganassi Racing	Honda	N/A	01:15.0849	01:14.7218	01:15.2462	4
5	18	(United States) David Malukas	Dale Coyne Racing with HMD Motorsports	Honda	01:15.7943	N/A	01:15.0519	01:15.8703	5
6	28	(France) Romain Grosjean	Andretti Autosport	Honda	N/A	01:15.1570	01:14.7695	01:15.9921	6
7	12	(Australia) Will Power	Team Penske	Chevrolet	N/A	01:15.4599	01:15.1384	N/A	7
8	27	(United States) Kyle Kirkwood	Andretti Autosport	Honda	N/A	01:15.0561	01:15.1641	N/A	8
9	2	(United States) Josef Newgarden	Team Penske	Chevrolet	01:15.9347	N/A	01:15.4862	N/A	9
10	7	(United States) Alexander Rossi	Arrow McLaren	Chevrolet	01:15.8303	N/A	01:15.5711	N/A	10
11	60	(Sweden) Linus Lundqvist **R**	Meyer Shank Racing	Honda	01:16.0892	N/A	01:16.0715	N/A	11
12	9	(New Zealand) Scott Dixon **W**	Chip Ganassi Racing	Honda	01:15.7094	N/A	01:16.7692	N/A	12
13	45	(Denmark) Christian Lundgaard	Rahal Letterman Lanigan Racing	Honda	01:16.0985	N/A	N/A	N/A	13
14	6	(Sweden) Felix Rosenqvist	Arrow McLaren	Chevrolet	N/A	01:15.4638	N/A	N/A	14
15	15	(United States) Graham Rahal	Rahal Letterman Lanigan Racing	Honda	01:16.1825	N/A	N/A	N/A	15
16	11	(New Zealand) Marcus Armstrong **R**	Chip Ganassi Racing	Honda	N/A	01:15.5631	N/A	N/A	16
17	06	(Brazil) Hélio Castroneves	Meyer Shank Racing	Honda	01:16.2203	N/A	N/A	N/A	17
18	77	(United Kingdom) Callum Ilott	Juncos Hollinger Racing	Chevrolet	N/A	01:16.0170	N/A	N/A	18
19	21	(Netherlands) Rinus VeeKay	Ed Carpenter Racing	Chevrolet	01:16.3356	N/A	N/A	N/A	19
20	8	(Sweden) Marcus Ericsson **W**	Chip Ganassi Racing	Honda	N/A	01:16.0420	N/A	N/A	20
21	14	(United States) Santino Ferrucci	A. J. Foyt Enterprises	Chevrolet	01:16.6416	N/A	N/A	N/A	21
22	30	(United Kingdom) Jack Harvey	Rahal Letterman Lanigan Racing	Honda	N/A	01:16.1193	N/A	N/A	22
23	78	(Argentina) Agustín Canapino **R**	Juncos Hollinger Racing	Chevrolet	01:16.6900	N/A	N/A	N/A	23
24	51	(United States) Sting Ray Robb **R**	Dale Coyne Racing with Rick Ware Racing	Honda	N/A	01:16.3907	N/A	N/A	24
25	55	(Denmark) Benjamin Pedersen **R**	A. J. Foyt Enterprises	Chevrolet	No Time	N/A	N/A	N/A	25
26	29	(Canada) Devlin DeFrancesco	Andretti Steinbrenner Autosport	Honda	N/A	01:16.4369	N/A	N/A	26
27	20	(United States) Ryan Hunter-Reay	Ed Carpenter Racing	Chevrolet	N/A	01:17.2417	N/A	N/A	27

Notes

- **Bold text** indicates fastest time set in session.

== Warmup ==
Due to qualifying being delayed to 6:15 PM ET, final practice was canceled.

Top Practice Speeds
Pos	No.	Driver	Team	Engine	Lap Time
1	CANCELED				
2	CANCELED				
3	CANCELED				

== Race ==
The race started at 12:30 PM ET on August 6, 2023.

=== Race classification ===
Pos	No.	Driver	Team	Engine	Laps	Time/Retired	Pit Stops	Grid	Laps Led	Pts.
1	27	(United States) Kyle Kirkwood	Andretti Autosport	Honda	80	01:58:02.3028	2	8	34	53
2	3	(New Zealand) Scott McLaughlin	Team Penske	Chevrolet	80	+0.7633	2	1	25	42
3	10	(Spain) Álex Palou	Chip Ganassi Racing	Honda	80	+1.7221	2	4	12	36
4	2	(United States) Josef Newgarden	Team Penske	Chevrolet	80	+3.1416	2	9		32
5	9	(New Zealand) Scott Dixon W	Chip Ganassi Racing	Honda	80	+4.1655	2	12		30
6	28	(France) Romain Grosjean	Andretti Autosport	Honda	80	+5.9518	2	6	4	29
7	8	(Sweden) Marcus Ericsson W	Chip Ganassi Racing	Honda	80	+6.4148	3	20	4	27
8	5	(Mexico) Pato O'Ward	Arrow McLaren	Chevrolet	80	+6.6966	2	2		24
9	45	(Denmark) Christian Lundgaard	Rahal Letterman Lanigan Racing	Honda	80	+8.0168	3	13		22
10	12	(Australia) Will Power	Team Penske	Chevrolet	80	+9.0456	2	7	1	21
11	06	(Brazil) Hélio Castroneves	Meyer Shank Racing	Honda	80	+9.8718	3	17		19
12	77	(United Kingdom) Callum Ilott	Juncos Hollinger Racing	Chevrolet	80	+10.6859	3	18		18
13	11	(New Zealand) Marcus Armstrong R	Chip Ganassi Racing	Honda	80	+11.4056	3	16		17
14	21	(Netherlands) Rinus VeeKay	Ed Carpenter Racing	Chevrolet	80	+11.8172	4	19		16
15	15	(United States) Graham Rahal	Rahal Letterman Lanigan Racing	Honda	80	+14.2271	3	15		15
16	20	(United States) Ryan Hunter-Reay	Ed Carpenter Racing	Chevrolet	80	+14.6874	4	27		14
17	51	(United States) Sting Ray Robb R	Dale Coyne Racing with Rick Ware Racing	Honda	80	+15.1158	4	24		13
18	14	(United States) Santino Ferrucci	A. J. Foyt Enterprises	Chevrolet	80	+16.5253	4	21		12
19	7	(United States) Alexander Rossi	Arrow McLaren	Chevrolet	78	+2 Laps	3	10		11
20	78	(Argentina) Agustín Canapino R	Juncos Hollinger Racing	Chevrolet	77	Off-Course	5	23		10
21	26	(United States) Colton Herta	Andretti Autosport with Curb-Agajanian	Honda	76	Mechanical	3	3		9
22	6	(Sweden) Felix Rosenqvist	Arrow McLaren	Chevrolet	73	Contact	4	14		8
23	55	(Denmark) Benjamin Pedersen R	A. J. Foyt Enterprises	Chevrolet	73	Contact	4	25		7
24	30	(United Kingdom) Jack Harvey	Rahal Letterman Lanigan Racing	Honda	71	Contact	3	22		6
25	60	(Sweden) Linus Lundqvist R	Meyer Shank Racing	Honda	69	Contact	3	11		5
26	29	(Canada) Devlin DeFrancesco	Andretti Steinbrenner Autosport	Honda	65	Contact	3	26		5
27	18	(United States) David Malukas	Dale Coyne Racing with HMD Motorsports	Honda	11	Mechanical	1	5		5
Fastest lap: (Sweden) Linus Lundqvist (Meyer Shank Racing) - 01:16.7115 (lap 57)

== Championship standings after the race ==
Drivers' Championship standings

	Pos.	Driver	Points
Unchanged	1	(Spain) Álex Palou	513
Unchanged	2	(United States) Josef Newgarden	429
Unchanged	3	(New Zealand) Scott Dixon	387
1	4	(New Zealand) Scott McLaughlin	371
1	5	(Sweden) Marcus Ericsson	357

Engine manufacturer standings

	Pos.	Manufacturer	Points
Unchanged	1	Honda	1108
Unchanged	2	Chevrolet	1016

- Note: Only the top five positions are included.

Previous race: 2023 Hy-Vee IndyCar Race Weekend	IndyCar Series; 2023 season	Next race: 2023 Gallagher Grand Prix
Previous race: 2022 Big Machine Music City Grand Prix	Big Machine Music City Grand Prix	Next race: None
