= 2023 Gallagher Grand Prix =

Indycar race held in Speedway, Indiana

(United States) 2023 Gallagher Grand Prix
Race details
14th round of the 2023 IndyCar season
← Previous race	Next race →
- Date: August 12, 2023
- Official name: Gallagher Grand Prix
- Location: Indianapolis Motor Speedway, Speedway, Indiana
- Course: Permanent road course 2.439 mi / 3.925 km
- Distance: 85 laps 207.315 mi / 333.641 km

Pole position
- Driver: (United States) Graham Rahal (Rahal Letterman Lanigan Racing)
- Time: 01:10.1132

Fastest lap
- Driver: (United States) Graham Rahal (Rahal Letterman Lanigan Racing)
- Time: 01:12.5917 (on lap 22 of 85)

Podium
- First: (New Zealand) Scott Dixon (Chip Ganassi Racing)
- Second: (United States) Graham Rahal (Rahal Letterman Lanigan Racing)
- Third: (Mexico) Pato O'Ward (Arrow McLaren)

Chronology
Previous	Next
May 2023	2024

The 2023 Gallagher Grand Prix was the fourteenth round of the 2023 IndyCar season. The race was held on August 12, 2023, in Speedway, Indiana at the Indianapolis Motor Speedway, as part of the IndyCar-NASCAR double-header weekend, with the Xfinity Series race taking place Saturday after the IndyCar race, and the Cup Series race being run on Sunday. The race consisted of 85 laps & was won by Scott Dixon.

The race marked Dixon's record-breaking 319th consecutive IndyCar race start and extended his record streak to 19 consecutive IndyCar seasons with at least one victory.

== Entry list ==
Key	Meaning
R	Rookie
W	Past winner

No.	Driver	Team	Engine
2	(United States) Josef Newgarden W	Team Penske	Chevrolet
3	(New Zealand) Scott McLaughlin	Team Penske	Chevrolet
5	(Mexico) Pato O'Ward	Arrow McLaren	Chevrolet
06	(Brazil) Hélio Castroneves	Meyer Shank Racing	Honda
6	(Sweden) Felix Rosenqvist	Arrow McLaren	Chevrolet
7	(United States) Alexander Rossi W	Arrow McLaren	Chevrolet
8	(Sweden) Marcus Ericsson	Chip Ganassi Racing	Honda
9	(New Zealand) Scott Dixon W	Chip Ganassi Racing	Honda
10	(Spain) Álex Palou W	Chip Ganassi Racing	Honda
11	(New Zealand) Marcus Armstrong R	Chip Ganassi Racing	Honda
12	(Australia) Will Power W	Team Penske	Chevrolet
14	(United States) Santino Ferrucci	A. J. Foyt Enterprises	Chevrolet
15	(United States) Graham Rahal	Rahal Letterman Lanigan Racing	Honda
18	(United States) David Malukas	Dale Coyne Racing with HMD Motorsports	Honda
20	(United States) Ryan Hunter-Reay	Ed Carpenter Racing	Chevrolet
21	(Netherlands) Rinus VeeKay W	Ed Carpenter Racing	Chevrolet
26	(United States) Colton Herta W	Andretti Autosport with Curb-Agajanian	Honda
27	(United States) Kyle Kirkwood	Andretti Autosport	Honda
28	(France) Romain Grosjean	Andretti Autosport	Honda
29	(Canada) Devlin DeFrancesco	Andretti Steinbrenner Autosport	Honda
30	(United Kingdom) Jack Harvey	Rahal Letterman Lanigan Racing	Honda
45	(Denmark) Christian Lundgaard	Rahal Letterman Lanigan Racing	Honda
51	(United States) Sting Ray Robb R	Dale Coyne Racing with Rick Ware Racing	Honda
55	(Denmark) Benjamin Pedersen R	A. J. Foyt Enterprises	Chevrolet
60	(Sweden) Linus Lundqvist R	Meyer Shank Racing	Honda
77	(United Kingdom) Callum Ilott	Juncos Hollinger Racing	Chevrolet
78	(Argentina) Agustín Canapino R	Juncos Hollinger Racing	Chevrolet

== Practice ==
=== Practice ===
Top Practice Speeds
Pos	No.	Driver	Team	Engine	Lap Time
1	15	(United States) Graham Rahal	Rahal Letterman Lanigan Racing	Honda	01:09.8421
2	6	(Sweden) Felix Rosenqvist	Arrow McLaren	Chevrolet	01:09.9267
3	45	(Denmark) Christian Lundgaard	Rahal Letterman Lanigan Racing	Honda	01:10.1246

== Qualifying ==
Qualifying was started at 12:30 PM ET on August 11, 2023.

=== Qualifying classification ===
Pos	No.	Driver	Team	Engine	Time				Final grid
Pos	No.	Driver	Team	Engine	Round 1		Round 2	Round 3	Final grid
Pos	No.	Driver	Team	Engine	Group 1	Group 2	Round 2	Round 3	Final grid
1	15	(United States) Graham Rahal	Rahal Letterman Lanigan Racing	Honda	N/A	01:10.2093	**01:09.9837**	**01:10.1132**	1
2	45	(Denmark) Christian Lundgaard	Rahal Letterman Lanigan Racing	Honda	N/A	**01:10.0031**	01:10.0077	01:10.2286	2
3	7	(United States) Alexander Rossi **W**	Arrow McLaren	Chevrolet	01:10.4055	N/A	01:10.0124	01:10.2932	3
4	5	(Mexico) Pato O'Ward	Arrow McLaren	Chevrolet	01:10.3423	N/A	01:10.1503	01:10.3453	4
5	29	(Canada) Devlin DeFrancesco	Andretti Steinbrenner Autosport	Honda	**01:10.2805**	N/A	01:10.2098	01:10.3938	5
6	28	(France) Romain Grosjean	Andretti Autosport	Honda	N/A	01:10.3121	01:10.1486	01:10.4021	6
7	11	(New Zealand) Marcus Armstrong **R**	Chip Ganassi Racing	Honda	N/A	01:10.3697	01:10.2106	N/A	7
8	30	(United Kingdom) Jack Harvey	Rahal Letterman Lanigan Racing	Honda	01:10.3420	N/A	01:10.2228	N/A	14 (Note: Hélio Castroneves, Jack Harvey & David Malukas each received a six-place grid penalty due to unapproved engine changes after the Nashville GP.)
9	10	(Spain) Álex Palou **W**	Chip Ganassi Racing	Honda	N/A	01:10.3658	01:10.2974	N/A	8
10	6	(Sweden) Felix Rosenqvist	Arrow McLaren	Chevrolet	01:10.4119	N/A	01:10.4389	N/A	9
11	3	(New Zealand) Scott McLaughlin	Team Penske	Chevrolet	01:10.3855	N/A	01:10.4782	N/A	10
12	06	(Brazil) Hélio Castroneves	Meyer Shank Racing	Honda	N/A	01:10.3196	01:10.5207	N/A	18
13	26	(United States) Colton Herta **W**	Andretti Autosport with Curb-Agajanian	Honda	01:10.4398	N/A	N/A	N/A	11
14	60	(Sweden) Linus Lundqvist **R**	Meyer Shank Racing	Honda	N/A	01:10.4570	N/A	N/A	12
15	27	(United States) Kyle Kirkwood	Andretti Autosport	Honda	01:10.4869	N/A	N/A	N/A	13
16	9	(New Zealand) Scott Dixon **W**	Chip Ganassi Racing	Honda	N/A	01:10.5006	N/A	N/A	15
17	12	(Australia) Will Power **W**	Team Penske	Chevrolet	01:10.5237	N/A	N/A	N/A	16
18	8	(Sweden) Marcus Ericsson	Chip Ganassi Racing	Honda	N/A	01:10.6348	N/A	N/A	17
19	2	(United States) Josef Newgarden **W**	Team Penske	Chevrolet	01:10.6150	N/A	N/A	N/A	25 (Note: Josef Newgarden received a six-place grid penalty due to unapproved engine change after qualifying.)
20	21	(Netherlands) Rinus VeeKay **W**	Ed Carpenter Racing	Chevrolet	N/A	01:10.7249	N/A	N/A	19
21	14	(United States) Santino Ferrucci	A. J. Foyt Enterprises	Chevrolet	01:10.6461	N/A	N/A	N/A	20
22	20	(United States) Ryan Hunter-Reay	Ed Carpenter Racing	Chevrolet	N/A	01:11.0083	N/A	N/A	21
23	18	(United States) David Malukas	Dale Coyne Racing with HMD Motorsports	Honda	01:10.8687	N/A	N/A	N/A	27
24	78	(Argentina) Agustín Canapino **R**	Juncos Hollinger Racing	Chevrolet	N/A	01:11.0611	N/A	N/A	22
25	51	(United States) Sting Ray Robb **R**	Dale Coyne Racing with Rick Ware Racing	Honda	01:11.5658	N/A	N/A	N/A	23
26	77	(United Kingdom) Callum Ilott	Juncos Hollinger Racing	Chevrolet	N/A	01:11.1027	N/A	N/A	24
27	55	(Denmark) Benjamin Pedersen **R**	A. J. Foyt Enterprises	Chevrolet	N/A	01:11.2971	N/A	N/A	26

Notes

- **Bold text** indicates fastest time set in session.

== Warmup ==
Top Practice Speeds
Pos	No.	Driver	Team	Engine	Lap Time
1	9	(New Zealand) Scott Dixon W	Chip Ganassi Racing	Honda	01:10.9851
2	10	(Spain) Álex Palou W	Chip Ganassi Racing	Honda	01:11.1365
3	3	(New Zealand) Scott McLaughlin	Team Penske	Chevrolet	01:11.3073

== Race ==
The race started on August 12, 2023, and was scheduled to start at 2:00 PM ET before being rescheduled to start at 2:20 PM ET.

=== Race classification ===
Pos	No.	Driver	Team	Engine	Laps	Time/Retired	Pit Stops	Grid	Laps Led	Pts.
1	9	(New Zealand) Scott Dixon W	Chip Ganassi Racing	Honda	85	01:51:24.7579	3	15	34	51
2	15	(United States) Graham Rahal	Rahal Letterman Lanigan Racing	Honda	85	+0.4779	3	1	36	44
3	5	(Mexico) Pato O'Ward	Arrow McLaren	Chevrolet	85	+8.0925	3	4		35
4	45	(Denmark) Christian Lundgaard	Rahal Letterman Lanigan Racing	Honda	85	+9.3211	3	2	7	33
5	7	(United States) Alexander Rossi W	Arrow McLaren	Chevrolet	85	+9.7935	3	3		30
6	12	(Australia) Will Power W	Team Penske	Chevrolet	85	+14.6929	3	16		28
7	10	(Spain) Álex Palou W	Chip Ganassi Racing	Honda	85	+17.6505	3	8		26
8	3	(New Zealand) Scott McLaughlin	Team Penske	Chevrolet	85	+22.1977	3	10		24
9	27	(United States) Kyle Kirkwood	Andretti Autosport	Honda	85	+23.4238	3	13		22
10	8	(Sweden) Marcus Ericsson	Chip Ganassi Racing	Honda	85	+30.3957	3	17		20
11	21	(Netherlands) Rinus VeeKay W	Ed Carpenter Racing	Chevrolet	85	+32.6728	3	19		19
12	60	(Sweden) Linus Lundqvist R	Meyer Shank Racing	Honda	85	+35.1190	3	12		18
13	26	(United States) Colton Herta W	Andretti Autosport with Curb-Agajanian	Honda	85	+42.4355	5	11		17
14	30	(United Kingdom) Jack Harvey	Rahal Letterman Lanigan Racing	Honda	85	+47.0297	3	14		16
15	06	(Brazil) Hélio Castroneves	Meyer Shank Racing	Honda	85	+48.1724	3	18		15
16	18	(United States) David Malukas	Dale Coyne Racing with HMD Motorsports	Honda	85	+61.9413	4	27		14
17	77	(United Kingdom) Callum Ilott	Juncos Hollinger Racing	Chevrolet	85	+69.5965	3	24		13
18	28	(France) Romain Grosjean	Andretti Autosport	Honda	84	+1 Laps	4	6		12
19	29	(Canada) Devlin DeFrancesco	Andretti Steinbrenner Autosport	Honda	84	+1 Laps	3	5	8	12
20	20	(United States) Ryan Hunter-Reay	Ed Carpenter Racing	Chevrolet	84	+1 Laps	3	21		10
21	78	(Argentina) Agustín Canapino R	Juncos Hollinger Racing	Chevrolet	84	+1 Laps	3	22		9
22	51	(United States) Sting Ray Robb R	Dale Coyne Racing with Rick Ware Racing	Honda	84	+1 Laps	3	23		8
23	14	(United States) Santino Ferrucci	A. J. Foyt Enterprises	Chevrolet	84	+1 Laps	4	20		7
24	11	(New Zealand) Marcus Armstrong R	Chip Ganassi Racing	Honda	83	+2 Laps	5	7		6
25	2	(United States) Josef Newgarden W	Team Penske	Chevrolet	83	+2 Laps	5	25		5
26	55	(Denmark) Benjamin Pedersen R	A. J. Foyt Enterprises	Chevrolet	79	+5 Laps	4	26		5
27	6	(Sweden) Felix Rosenqvist	Arrow McLaren	Chevrolet	68	Mechanical	3	9		5
Fastest lap: (United States) Graham Rahal (Rahal Letterman Lanigan Racing) - 01:12.5917 (Lap 22)

== Championship standings after the race ==
Drivers' Championship standings

	Pos.	Driver	Points
Unchanged	1	(Spain) Álex Palou	539
1	2	(New Zealand) Scott Dixon	438
1	3	(United States) Josef Newgarden	434
Unchanged	4	(New Zealand) Scott McLaughlin	395
1	5	(Mexico) Pato O'Ward	388

Engine manufacturer standings

	Pos.	Manufacturer	Points
Unchanged	1	Honda	1204
Unchanged	2	Chevrolet	1166

- Note: Only the top five positions are included.

== Footnotes ==
Previous race: 2023 Big Machine Music City Grand Prix	NTT IndyCar Series; 2023 season	Next race: 2023 Bommarito Automotive Group 500
Previous race: 2022 Gallagher Grand Prix	Gallagher Grand Prix	Next race: Final race
