= Pato O'Ward =

Mexican racing driver (born 1999)

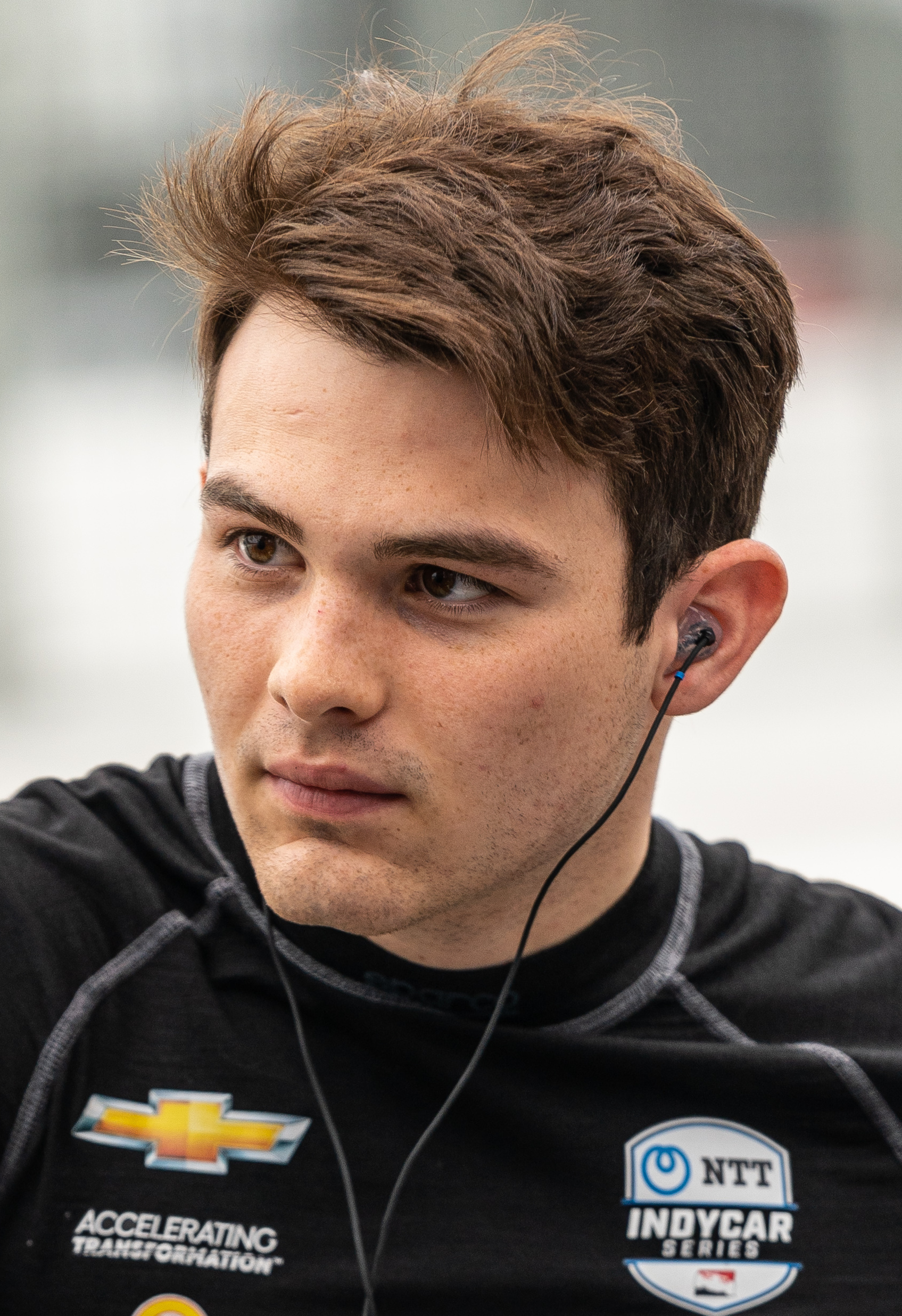
- O'Ward in 2021
- Nationality: (Mexico) Mexican
- Born: Patricio O'Ward Junco; 6 May 1999 (age 27) Monterrey, Nuevo León, Mexico
- Categorisation: FIA Silver (2016–2021); FIA Gold (2022–2023); FIA Platinum (2024–)

IndyCar Series career
- 123 races run over 9 years
- Team: No. 5 (Arrow McLaren)
- Best finish: 2nd (2025)
- First race: 2018 Grand Prix of Sonoma (Sonoma)
- Last race: 2026 Mission Grand Prix of Monterey (Laguna Seca)
- First win: 2021 XPEL 375 (Texas)
- Last win: 2026 Snap-on Makers and Fixers 250 (Milwaukee)
Wins	Podiums	Poles
12	35	7

Previous series
- 2019; 2019; 2017–2018; 2017; 2016; 2015–2016; 2015–16; 2014; 2013; 2013; 2013: FIA Formula 2; Super Formula; Indy Lights; IMSA; Mazda Prototype Lites; Pro Mazda; NACAM Formula 4; French F4; Pacific Fórmula F2000; Formula Renault 1.6 NEC; LATAM Formula 2000

Championship titles
- 2018; 2017: Indy Lights; IMSA – PC

Awards
- 2020: Indianapolis 500 Rookie of the Year

Patricio "Pato" O'Ward Junco (born 6 May 1999) is a Mexican auto racing driver who competes full-time in the IndyCar Series, driving the No. 5 Chevrolet for Arrow McLaren. He was signed to the McLaren Driver Development Programme and was a reserve driver for their Formula One team. He is the 2018 Indy Lights champion and is a two time runner-up at the Indianapolis 500.

== Early life and career ==
O'Ward was born in Monterrey, Mexico to Patricio O'Ward and Elba Junco. He attended high school at TMI Episcopal in San Antonio, Texas, US. He explained on an episode of The Marshall Pruett Podcast that his surname comes from his Irish great-grandfather, adding that he considers himself "full-blown Mexican".

O'Ward began his racing career in karting at the end of 2005 and remained in karting until 2012. During 2013, he competed in open-wheel racing, in Latam Fórmula 2000, Formula Renault 1.6 NEC and Pacific F2000. In 2014, O'Ward competed in French F4 Championship.

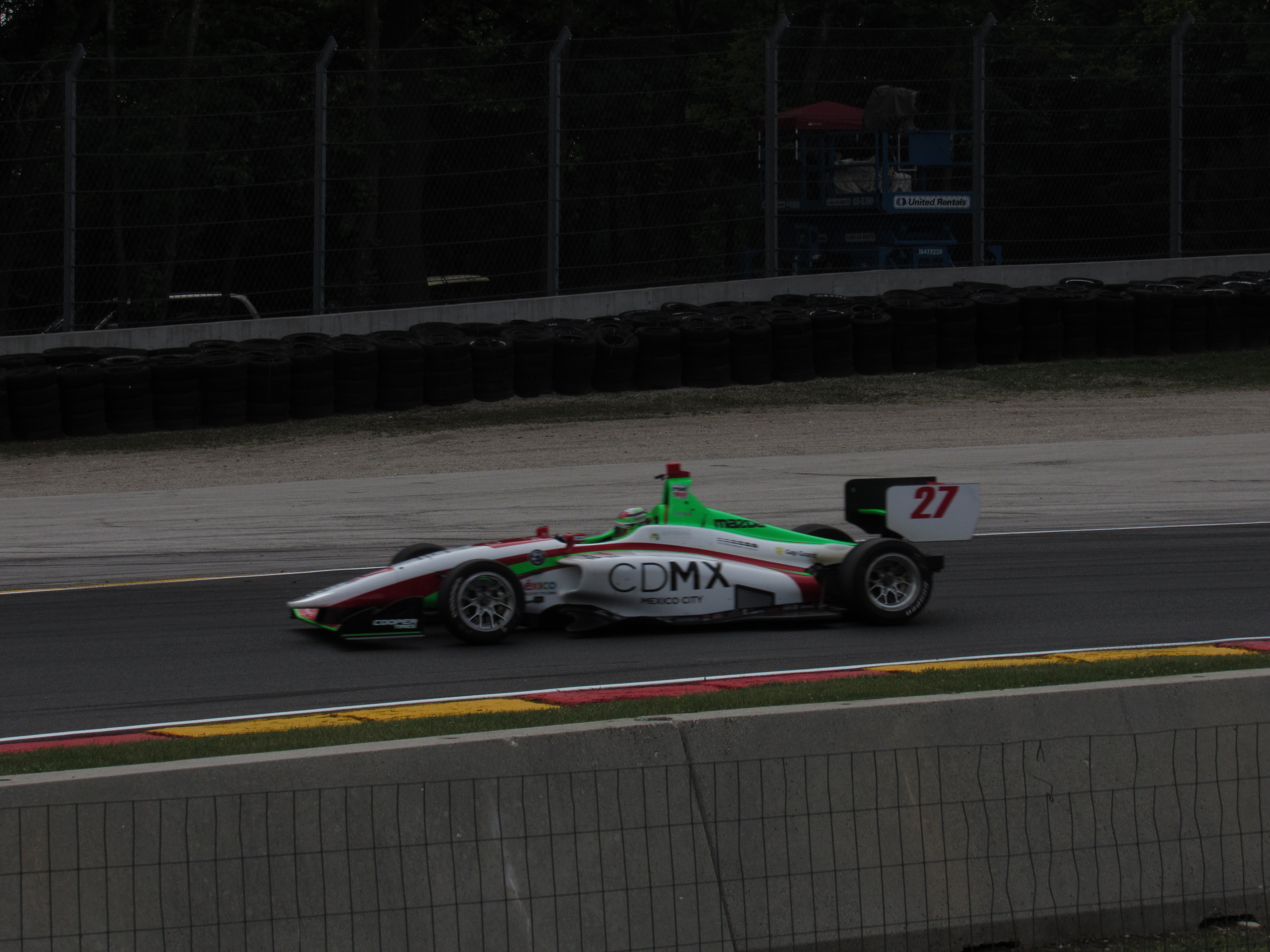
O'Ward driving at Road America during the 2018 Indy Lights season

In 2015, O'Ward debuted in the Pro Mazda Championship with Team Pelfrey, finishing sixth in the championship. In 2016, he returned to compete with Team Pelfrey in the Pro Mazda Championship, finishing the season as championship runner-up.

=== Indy Lights ===
In 2018, O'Ward signed with Andretti Autosport to compete in the Indy Lights championship. He won nine of the seventeen races, was named Rookie of the Year and won the drivers championship at the penultimate race of the season in Portland, beating runner-up Colton Herta.

== IndyCar ==
=== IndyCar debut with Harding Racing (2018) ===
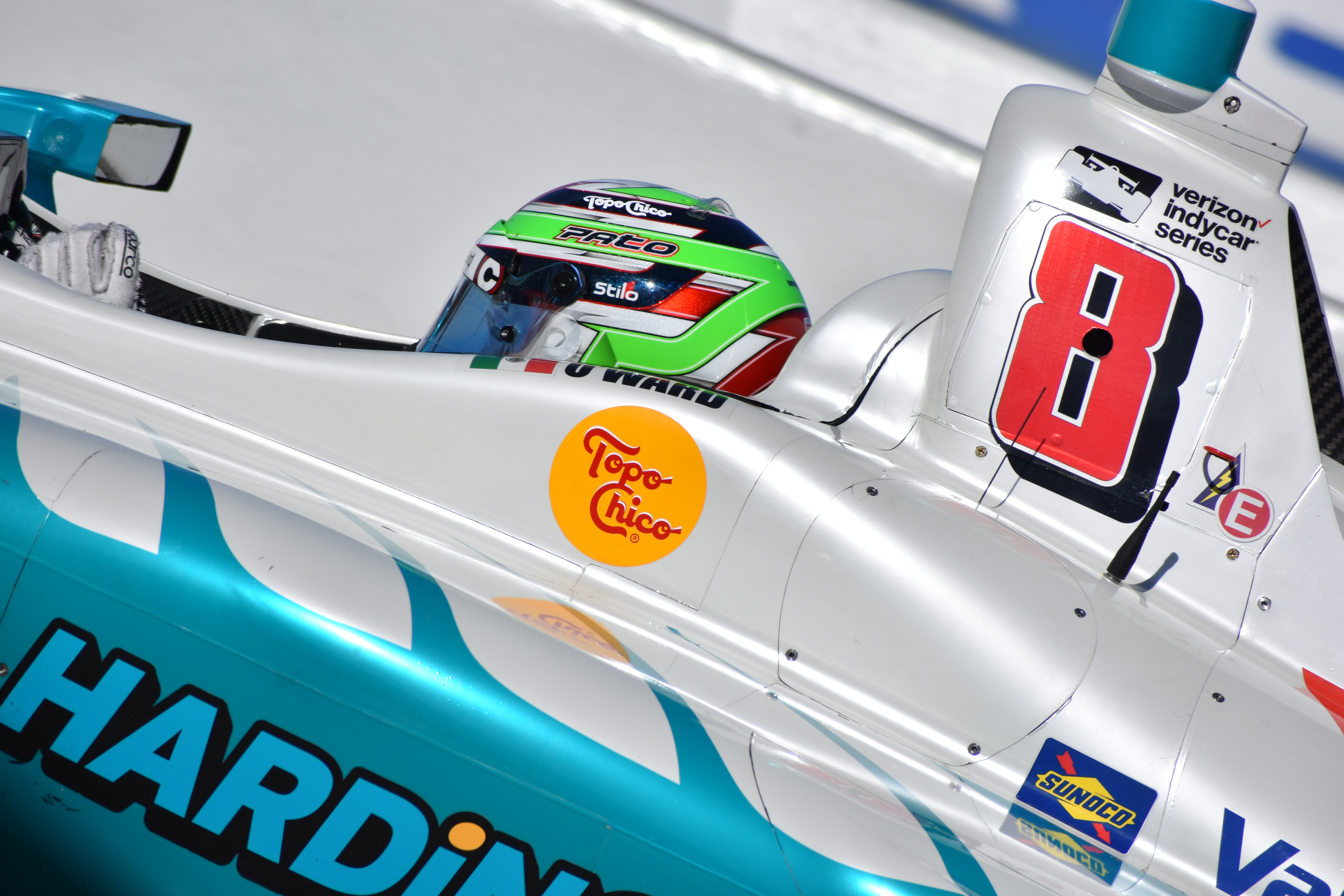
O'Ward exiting the pits during qualifying at Sonoma in 2018, where he qualified fifth in his IndyCar debut

Two weeks after clinching the 2018 Indy Lights championship title, O'Ward made his IndyCar Series debut at Sonoma Raceway in a second Harding Racing entry, where he qualified fifth and finished ninth. This tied him with David Martínez for the best finish on debut by a Mexican driver in American open-wheel racing.

=== Part-time drive with Carlin (2019) ===
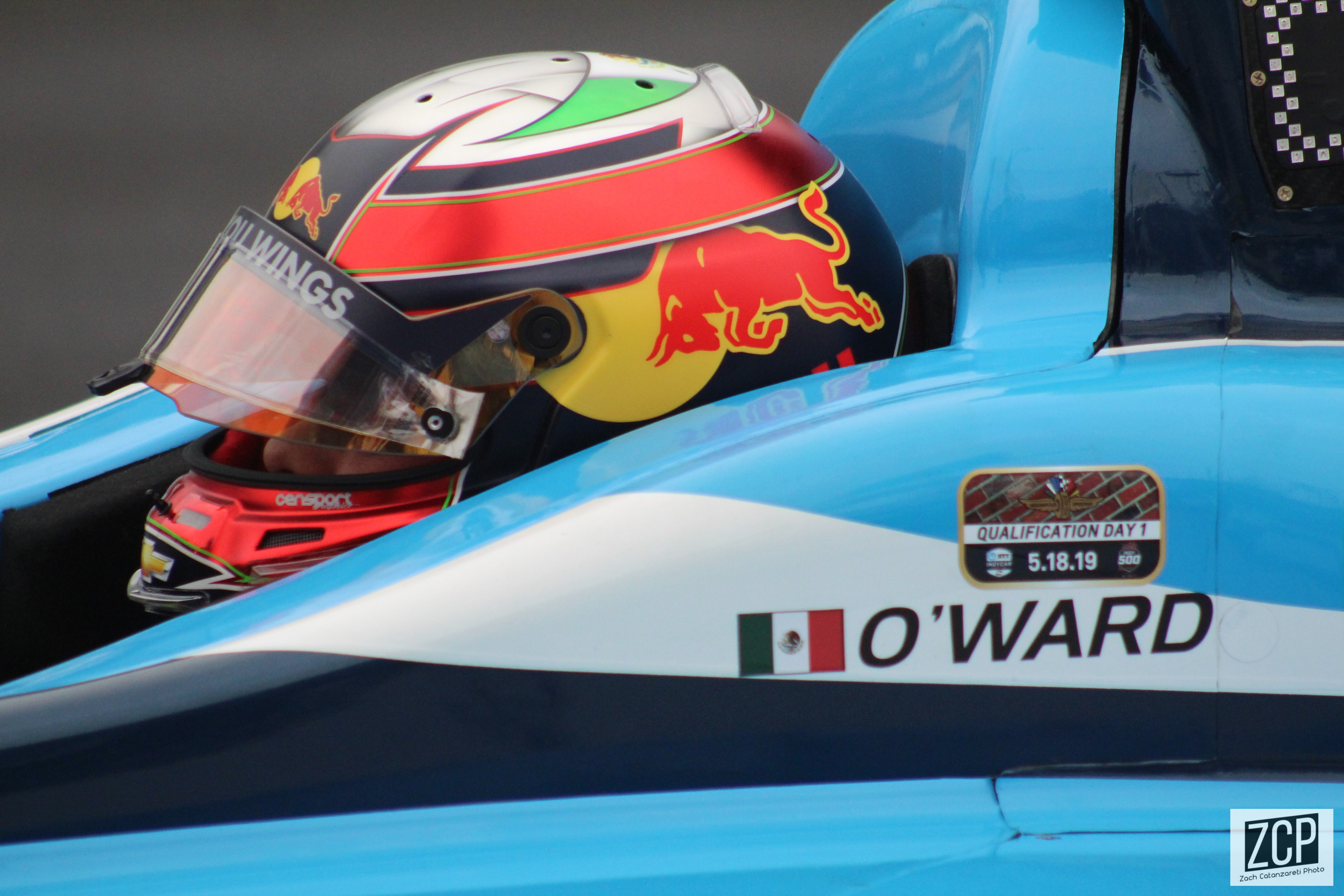
O'Ward during qualifying at the 2019 Indianapolis 500

In 2019, O'Ward was scheduled to move up to the IndyCar Series full-time, piloting the No. 8 entry for Harding Steinbrenner Racing. However, sponsorship issues led to O'Ward being granted his release from the team on 11 February 2019.

On 7 March, O'Ward joined Carlin on a part-time deal that saw him drive in thirteen races in the 2019 season. O'Ward drove Carlin's second entry for twelve races and drove Carlin's third entry for the Indianapolis 500. O'Ward failed to qualify for the Indy 500 along with Carlin teammate Max Chilton and the Carlin-prepared car of McLaren Racing's Fernando Alonso. His Red Bull deal, which was signed in May, also saw him only compete in eight of the thirteen events he originally signed for. He placed 26th in the final points standings, with the best race finish of eighth, achieved at the Circuit of the Americas.

On 30 October, it was announced that O'Ward had returned to IndyCar by signing a deal with Arrow McLaren SP for the 2020 season.

=== Arrow McLaren (2020–present) ===
==== 2020 ====
In his first season for Arrow McLaren SP (AMSP), O'Ward was partnered by Oliver Askew for most races, with Hélio Castroneves replacing Askew at the Harvest GP and with Fernando Alonso in a third entry at the Indianapolis 500. O'Ward had a strong start to 2020, clinching pole position and achieving his first podium finish at the second round of the Road America double-header, finishing second. At Iowa, he finished fourth in the first race. He was fourth in the overall points standings heading into the Indianapolis 500, which was held in August due to the COVID-19 pandemic. O'Ward would go on to finish sixth in his first Indianapolis 500 start and won the Indianapolis 500 Rookie of the Year award for his performance. He subsequently scored consecutive podium finishes in the double-header at World Wide Technology Raceway.

O'Ward was placing as high as third in the driver standings before finishing eleventh and ninth at the double-header at Mid-Ohio and a disappointing 22nd place at the first race of the Harvest GP double-header at Indianapolis Motor Speedway, which dropped him to fifth in the overall standings. After signing a new deal with AMSP, he finished second in the season finale at St. Petersburg, securing fourth in the final championship standings.

==== 2021 ====
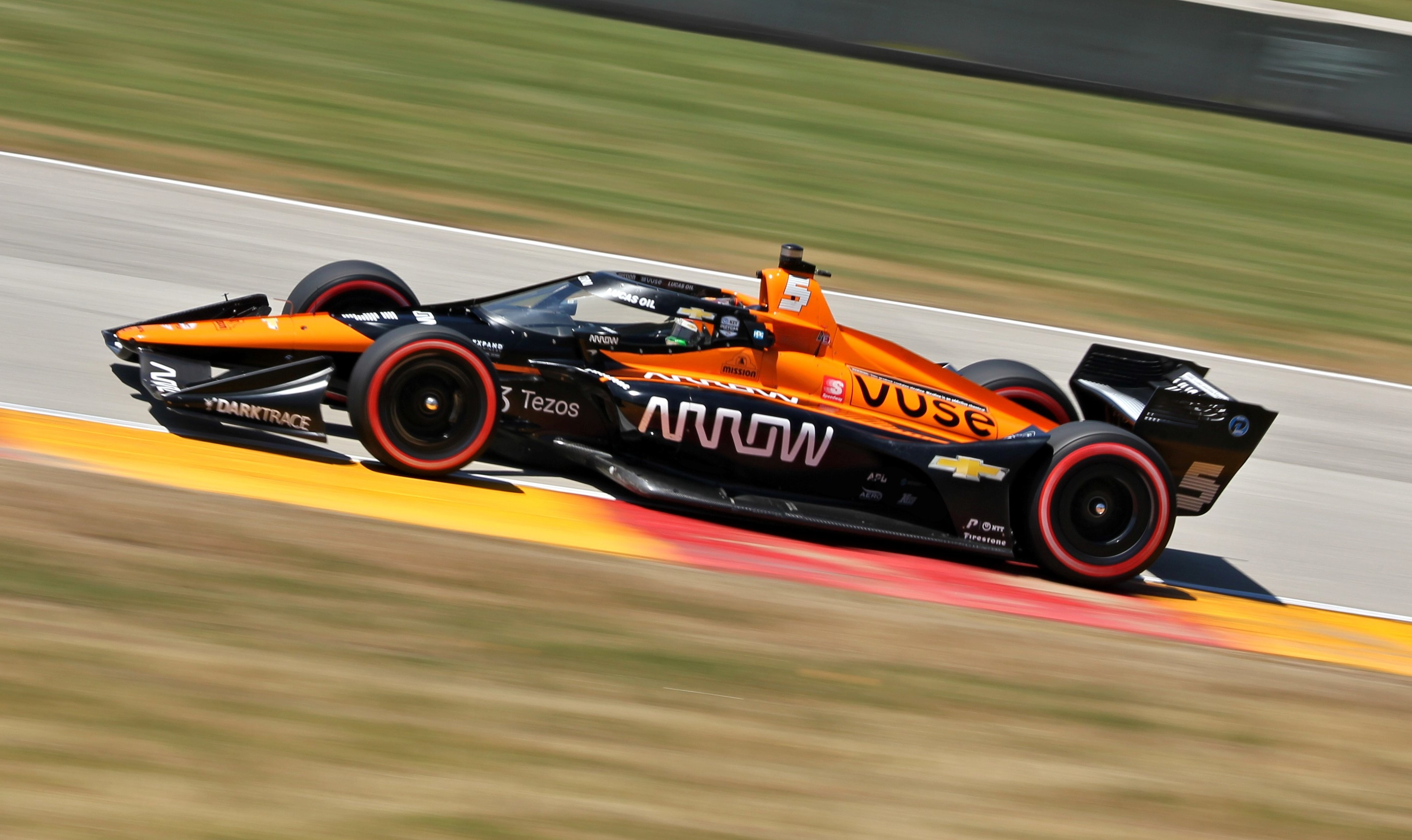
O'Ward during the 2021 IndyCar Series at Road America

O'Ward's second season with Arrow McLaren SP saw him partner Felix Rosenqvist, previously of Chip Ganassi Racing. O'Ward emerged as a title contender in 2021. He started the season off by earning his second career pole position at the season opener at Barber but was unable to convert that pole position into a win. O'Ward took his first podium of the season with a third-place finish in the first race at the Texas Motor Speedway and took his maiden IndyCar victory in the second race the following day. He became the first Mexican driver to win an IndyCar race since Adrian Fernandez in 2004 at Fontana and the first Chevrolet driver not from Team Penske to win a race since 2016.

After taking his first win, O'Ward never dropped lower than third in the championship standings, consistently fending off series champions Josef Newgarden and Scott Dixon while challenging Álex Palou for much of the season. He started on the pole and finished third at the first race at the Detroit double-header and scored his second win of the season at the second race, his first win on a street course. He achieved his third pole position of the season at the Big Machine Spiked Coolers Grand Prix, where he eventually finished fifth in the race. He achieved another podium with a second-place finish at Gateway, taking the championship lead for the first time in the season. However, a 14th-place finish at Portland by O'Ward saw race-winner Palou retake the lead. At the penultimate race of the season, he clinched a fifth-place finish, remaining second in the points standings heading into the season finale.

At the season finale at Long Beach, O'Ward was one of three drivers who were mathematically in contention for the series title, alongside Palou and Newgarden. To win the title, barring Palou retiring from the race, O'Ward would have to earn the bonus point from qualifying for the pole position, win the race, and hope Palou finished no better than thirteenth to not have a tiebreaker scenario come into play. After a controversial qualifying session where he failed to advance to the Firestone Fast Six and qualified eighth, O'Ward was taken out by Ed Jones early in the race and ultimately retired from the race due to a broken driveshaft, effectively ending his championship hopes. He ultimately finished third in the championship behind Palou and Newgarden. O'Ward secured his first IndyCar track discipline championship when he won the A.J. Foyt Cup as the highest-scoring driver in the series on oval courses in 2021.

==== 2022 ====
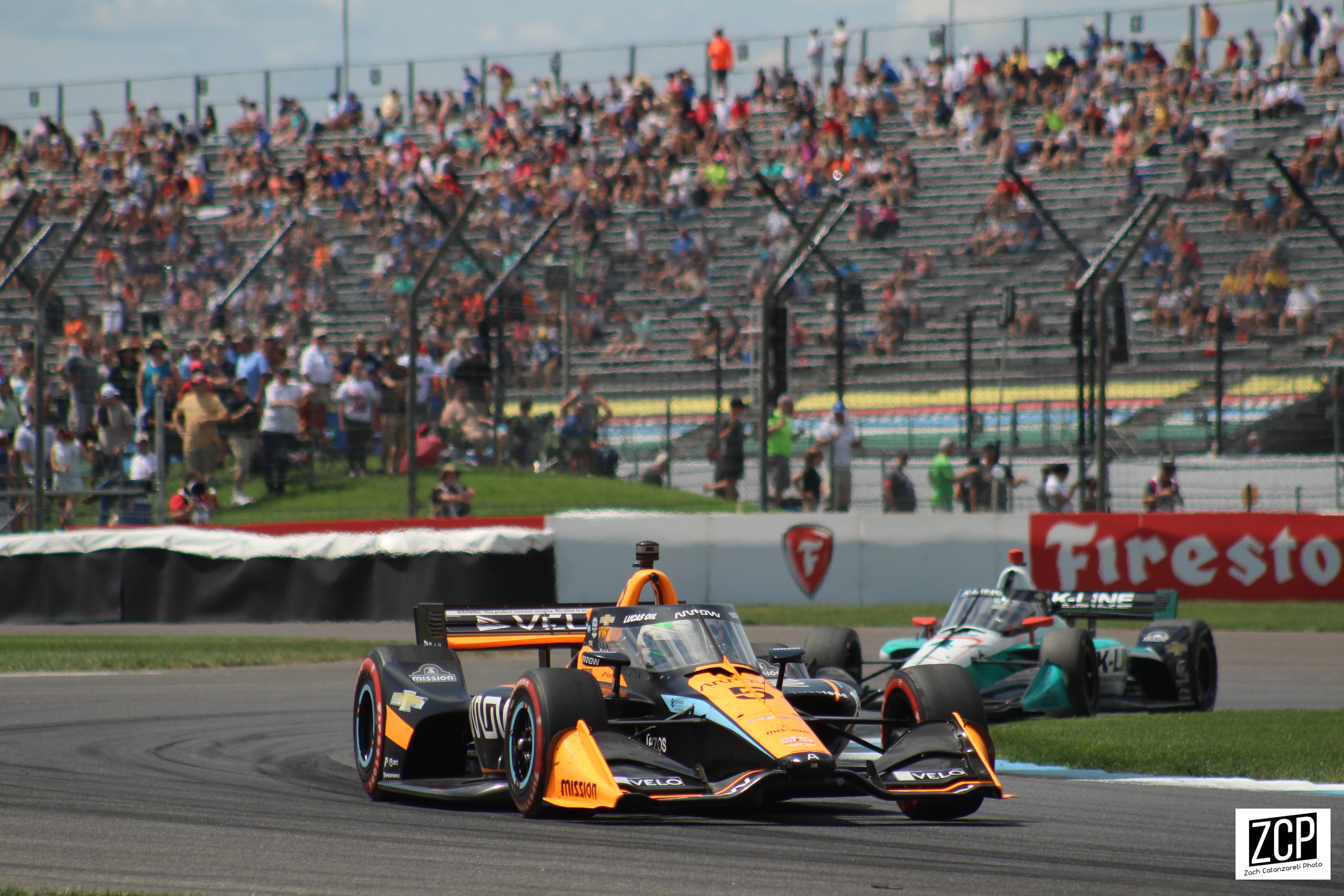
O'Ward at the 2022 GMR Grand Prix

O'Ward would return to Arrow McLaren SP in a contract year. He started the season slowly before capturing his first win of the season and first on a permanent road course at the fourth round at Barber. On 27 May 2022, O'Ward announced he had signed a three-year contract extension with Arrow McLaren SP. O'Ward followed up his new contract with a second-place finish in the 106th Indianapolis 500, briefly nosing ahead of Marcus Ericsson for the lead on the final lap but was unable to complete the pass. After a difficult four race stint that saw him retire with mechanical issues in back to back races O'Ward picked up a second win on the season and first on a short oval at the second round at Iowa. He ultimately finished seventh in the championship standings.

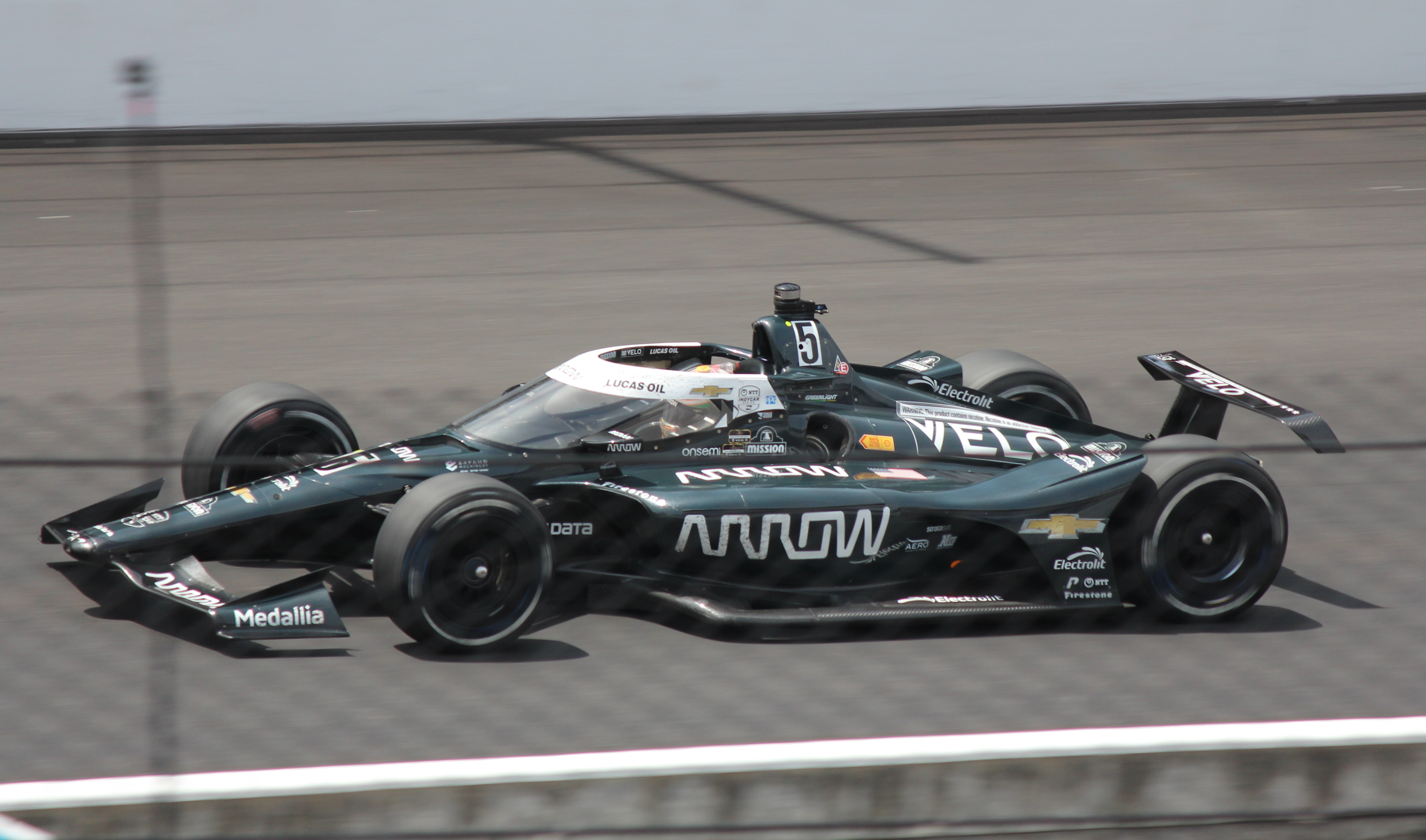
O'Ward competing in the 2023 Indianapolis 500

==== 2023 ====
O'Ward had a strong start to 2023, with three second-place finishes in the first five races. His performance in the third round at Long Beach, however, was subject to criticism after he attempted an overtake on Scott Dixon that caused Dixon to crash out of the race. O'Ward started fifth at the 2023 Indianapolis 500, his best starting position in the race to date, but crashed out of the race fighting for the second place with Marcus Ericsson. He ultimately finished fourth in the championship, picking up no wins but having the most podium finishes and top five finishes of his career.

==== 2024 ====
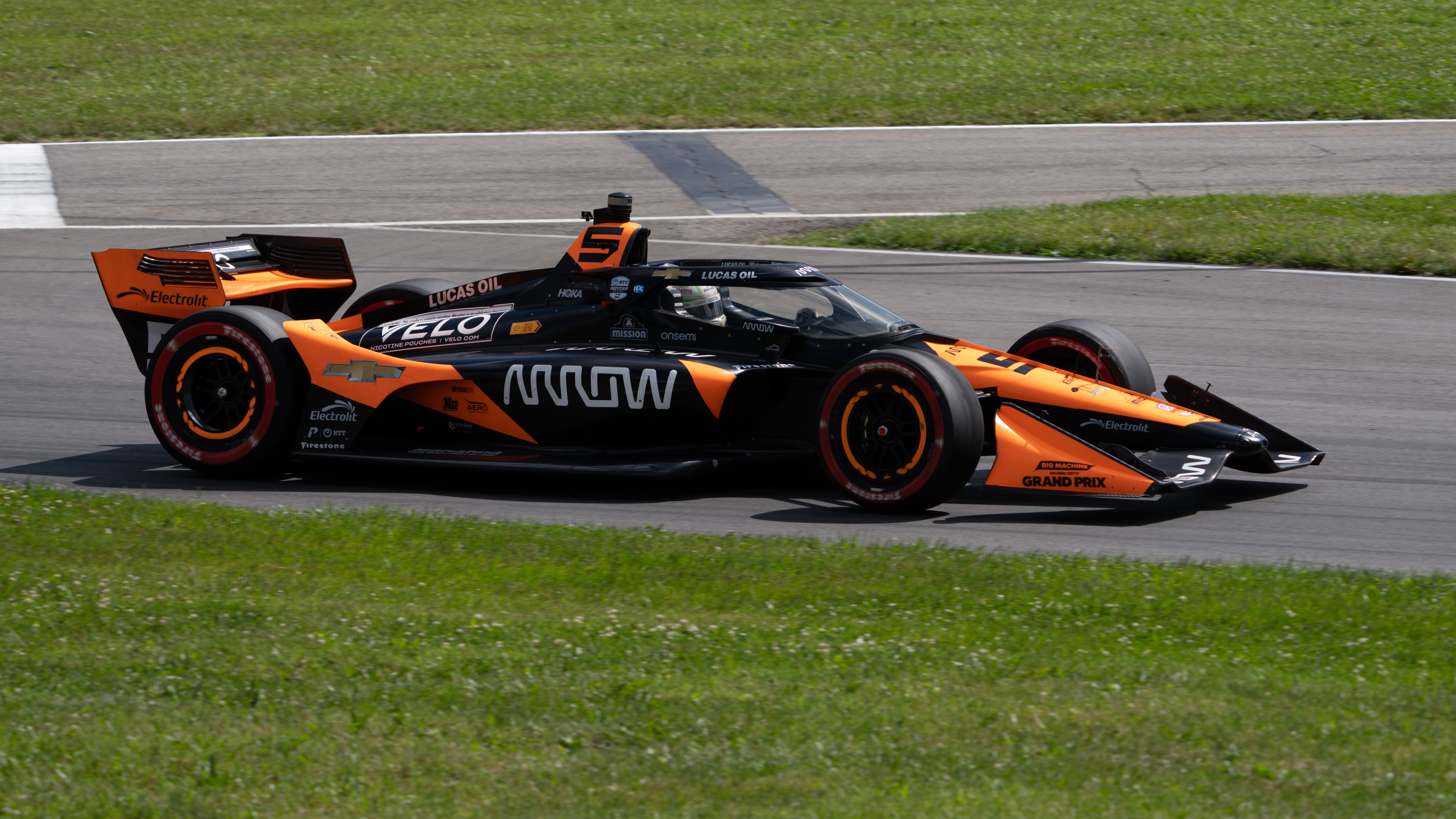
O'Ward taking 2nd at qualifying in Mid-Ohio in 2024

O'Ward started his 2024 campaign with a second place in St. Petersburg. Over a month later, O'Ward was awarded the win at St. Petersburg after race winner Josef Newgarden was found to have violated push to pass regulations and was subsequently stripped of the victory. O'Ward led eleven laps and finished second in the 2024 Indianapolis 500, following a last-lap pass from winner Josef Newgarden. After picking up a series of top-ten finishes after the Indianapolis 500, O'Ward scored his second win of the year at Mid-Ohio by holding off polesitter Alex Palou in the final laps of the Honda Indy 200. With his win O'Ward became the first driver to win a race in IndyCar's hybrid powertrain era. O'Ward picked up a third win at the first race at IndyCar's return to the Milwaukee Mile, securing his first season of more than two wins on the year.

==== 2025 ====
O'Ward started the 2025 season with an eleventh place in St. Petersburg. He finished third in the 2025 Indianapolis 500, behind Álex Palou and David Malukas. He would earn his eighth-career victory in his one-hundredth-race in the series at Iowa 1. He would also win at Toronto.

==== 2026 ====
After the 2026 Indianapolis 500, O'Ward sat fifth in the standings with top-five finishes at 2026 Firestone Grand Prix of St. Petersburg, 2026 Good Ranchers 250, 2026 Java House Grand Prix of Arlington, 2026 Acura Grand Prix of Long Beach and the 2026 Indianapolis 500. He won his first race of the year at Mid-Ohio. He also swept the race weekend at the Milwaukee Mile.

== Formula One ==
=== Stint with Red Bull Junior Team ===
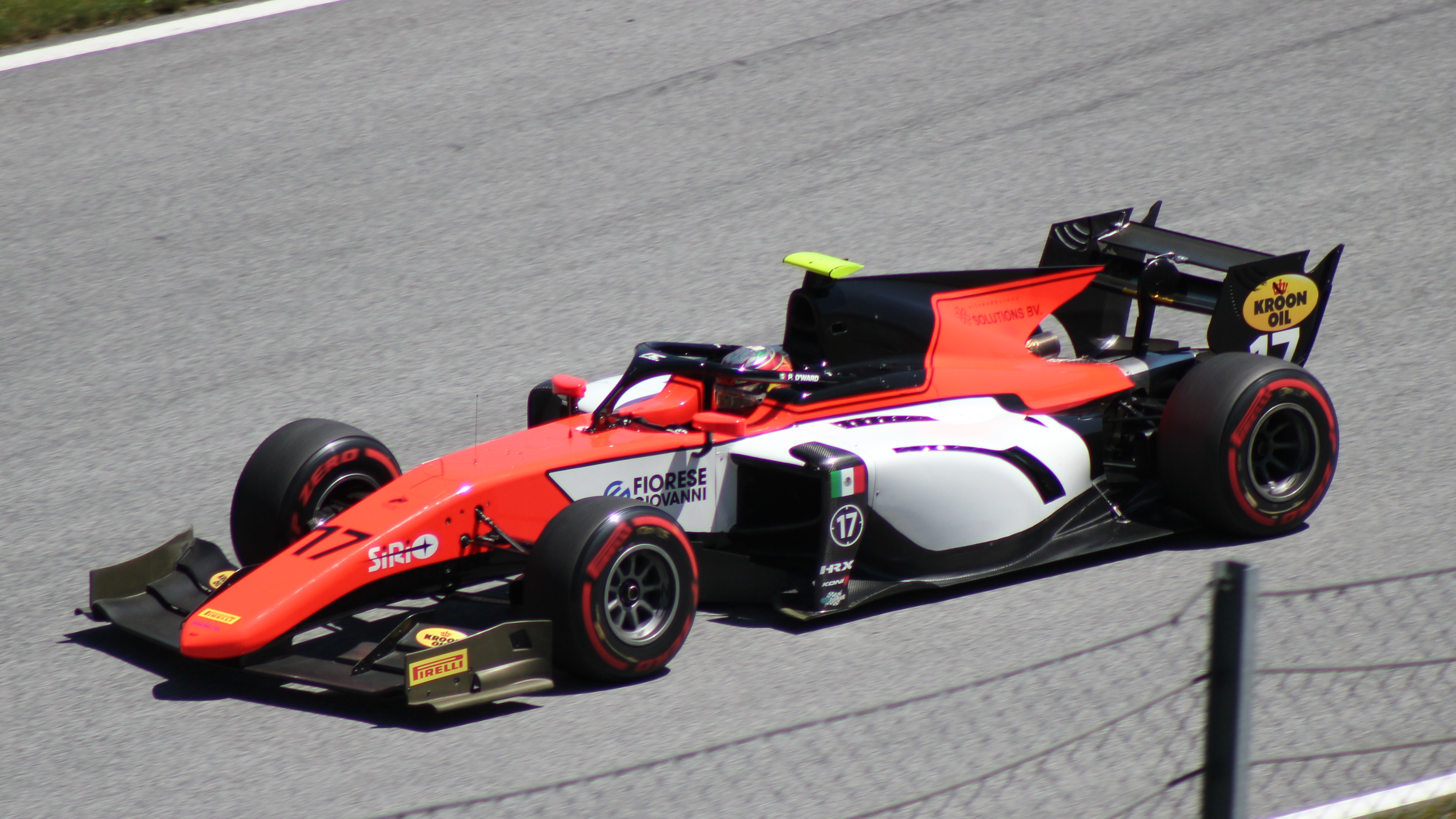
O'Ward at the Red Bull Ring in a one-off appearance during the 2019 Formula 2 Championship

In May 2019, O'Ward was signed to the Red Bull Junior Team and the following month, was placed on a one-event deal to compete at the Red Bull Ring in Formula 2, substituting for the banned Mahaveer Raghunathan, and was announced as Dan Ticktum's replacement in the Super Formula Championship.

Due to a decision by the FIA to award fewer Super License points for his Indy Lights championship win, O'Ward was unable to attain the required points to be able to race Formula One in 2020 and would not be retained by Red Bull past 2019. With an IndyCar series ride with McLaren available, Red Bull driver development program head Helmut Marko granted O'Ward an early release from his contract after three Super Formula rounds.

=== McLaren ===
Before the 2021 IndyCar Series season, McLaren CEO Zak Brown promised O'Ward a test of the McLaren MCL35M if he could win at least one IndyCar race. O'Ward held up his end of the deal with McLaren after winning the XPEL 375 and Brown subsequently confirmed O'Ward would get the promised F1 test. O'Ward got his first opportunity to drive a Formula One Car on 14 November 2021, when he demonstrated a McLaren MP4/13 at Laguna Seca. Two time Formula One World Champion Mika Häkkinen, who drove the MP4/13 to his first Driver's Championship, was on hand to help familiarize O'Ward with the car. During the run, O'Ward beat his fastest lap time around Laguna Seca in the Dallara DW12 with the UAK18 aero kit by over a second with the MP4/13.

On 14 December 2021, O'Ward tested the MCL35M at the end of the season in Abu Dhabi, where he finished fourth-fastest after completing 92 laps. Despite speculation that the test could lead to O'Ward moving up to Formula 1 upon a strong performance, Brown dismissed those rumors by confirming O'Ward would be back with McLaren in IndyCar for the 2022 season, following McLaren's purchase of 75% ownership stake in Schmidt Peterson Motorsports. Brown later stated that the Abu Dhabi test could lead to O'Ward getting additional Formula One tests and even race weekend practice time, if O'Ward adapts to the car and the tires well, but added that O'Ward would have to win the IndyCar Series championship for McLaren to consider moving him from IndyCar to Formula One. In July 2022, O'Ward was confirmed for additional Formula One tests with McLaren along with late season race weekend practice time being a possibility.

In September 2022, it was announced that O'Ward would carry out another test with McLaren at the Circuit de Barcelona-Catalunya together with Álex Palou. He participated in another test at the Red Bull Ring in October, together with Álex Palou once again. O'Ward made his free practice debut with McLaren at the 2022 Abu Dhabi Grand Prix.

In April 2023, McLaren formed a new Driver Development Programme with O'Ward signed to it. In September, McLaren announced that O'Ward would participate in the Abu Dhabi Grand Prix free practice session. In November, McLaren confirmed O'Ward as one of their reserve drivers for the 2024 season.

O'Ward made his first free practice appearance of the 2024 season during the Mexico City Grand Prix, and finished the session in thirteenth. This marked the first time that O'Ward competed in a Formula One session within his home country.

O'Ward made his free practice return during the 2025 season, at his home Mexico City Grand Prix once again for McLaren. He repeated this feat at the Abu Dhabi Grand Prix, and followed it up by partaking in the young drivers' test at the Yas Marina Circuit a few days after.

O'Ward continued as the reserve driver for McLaren during the 2026 season.

== Sports car racing ==
In 2017, O'Ward competed in the WeatherTech SportsCar Championship with Performance Tech Motorsports in the Prototype Challenge (PC) class. O'Ward and his co-drivers won the 24 Hours of Daytona and the 12 Hours of Sebring in the PC class, making him the youngest driver ever to win both races, at seventeen years old. He went on to win the 2017 Prototype Challenge drivers championship, alongside James French, and the North American Endurance Cup, alongside French and Kyle Masson.

In 2022, O'Ward participated again in the 24 Hours of Daytona in the LMP2 entry with DragonSpeed, partnered by Colton Herta, Devlin DeFrancesco, and Eric Lux. The team won after an overtake by Herta for first place in the final 11 minutes of the race.

== Karting record ==
=== Karting career summary ===
Season	Series	Team	Position
2005	Easykart Copa Monterrey — Puffo		3rd
2007	Easykart Mexico — 60cc	Paradise Racing	1st
2007	Rotax Max Challenge Mexico - North East — Micro Max	Paradise Racing	1st
2007	Rotax Max Challenge Mexico - North West — Micro Max	Paradise Racing	4th
2008	Florida Winter Tour — Rotax Micro Max	Paradise Racing	6th
2008	Rotax Max Challenge Mexico - North West — Micro Max	Paradise Racing	4th
2008	Canadian National Karting Championship — Rotax Micro Max		8th
2008	Rotax Grand Nationals USA — Micro Max	BTK Motorsports	1st
2009	Florida Winter Tour — Rotax Micro Max	Paradise Racing	3rd
2009	Rotax Max Challenge Mexico - North West — Mini Max	Paradise Racing	2nd
2009	Rotax Max Challenge Mexico - South West — Mini Max	Paradise Racing	1st
2009	South West Regional Championship — Rotax Mini Max		1st
2009	Rotax Grand Nationals USA — Mini Max		2nd
2010	Florida Winter Tour — Rotax Mini Max		4th
2010	SKUSA Pro Tour — TaG Cadet		10th
2010	SKUSA SuperNationals — TaG Cadet	J3 Competition	1st
2010	ROK Cup International Final — Mini ROK	J3 Competition	4th
2011	SKUSA Pro Tour — TaG Cadet		14th
2011	SKUSA SuperNationals — TaG Cadet	KML	2nd
2011	ROK Cup International Final — Mini ROK	J3 Competition	10th
2012	Florida Winter Tour — Rotax Mini Max	KML	8th
2012	Rotax Max Challenge Pan-American Championship — Junior		19th
2012	SKUSA SuperNationals — S5 Junior	Paradise Racing	1st
2013	SKUSA SuperNationals — S5 Junior	Acceleration Karting	9th
2014	Florida Winter Tour — Rotax Junior	SH Racing	10th
2014	SKUSA SuperNationals — TaG Junior	Praga North America	NC
2014	SKUSA SuperNationals — S5 Junior	Praga North America	6th
2015	Florida Winter Tour — Rotax Senior	SH Karting	15th

== Racing record ==
=== Racing career summary ===
Season	Series	Team	Races	Wins	Poles	F/Laps	Podiums	Points	Position
2013	Pacific Formula F2000	Dave Freitas Racing	5	4	2	5	5	165	5th
2013	Formula Renault 1.6 NEC	Provily Racing	6	0	0	0	0	117	7th
2013	Latam Fórmula 2000	Paradise Racing	6	0	0	0	0	44	12th
2014	French F4 Championship	Auto Sport Academy	15	1	0	0	2	143	7th
2015	Pro Mazda Championship	Team Pelfrey	16	0	0	1	3	250	6th
2015–16	NACAM Formula 4 Championship	Martiga EG	12	6	2	5	11	247	**3rd**
2016	Pro Mazda Championship	Team Pelfrey	16	7	5	8	9	393	**2nd**
2016	Mazda Prototype Lites	Performance Tech Motorsports	2	0	0	0	1	32	16th
2017	Indy Lights	Team Pelfrey	4	0	0	0	1	58	15th
2017	IMSA SportsCar Championship – PC	Performance Tech Motorsports	8	7	0	8	8	283	**1st**
2017	North American Endurance Cup – PC	Performance Tech Motorsports	4	3	0	4	4	56	**1st**
2018	Indy Lights	Andretti Autosport	17	9	9	4	13	491	**1st**
2018	IMSA SportsCar Championship – Prototype	Performance Tech Motorsports	2	0	0	0	0	41	41st
2018	IndyCar Series	Harding Racing	1	0	0	0	0	44	31st
2018	IMSA Prototype Challenge – LMP3	Charles Wicht Racing	1	1	0	0	1	35	30th
2019	IndyCar Series	Carlin	7	0	0	1	0	115	26th
2019	Super Formula	Team Mugen	3	0	0	0	0	3	18th
2019	FIA Formula 2 Championship	MP Motorsport	2	0	0	0	0	0	26th
2020	IndyCar Series	Arrow McLaren SP	14	0	1	1	4	416	4th
2021	IndyCar Series	Arrow McLaren SP	16	2	3	2	5	487	**3rd**
2022	IndyCar Series	Arrow McLaren SP	17	2	1	2	4	480	7th
2022	IMSA SportsCar Championship – LMP2	DragonSpeed USA	1	1	0	0	1	0	NC†
2022	Formula One	McLaren F1 Team	Test driver						
2023	IndyCar Series	Arrow McLaren	17	0	0	1	7	484	4th
2023	Formula One	McLaren F1 Team	Test driver						
2024	IndyCar Series	Arrow McLaren	17	3	0	1	6	460	5th
2024	IMSA SportsCar Championship – LMP2	United Autosports USA	1	0	1	0	0	285	42nd
2024	Formula One	McLaren F1 Team	Test driver						
2025	IndyCar Series	Arrow McLaren	17	2	2	1	6	515	**2nd**
2025	Formula One	McLaren F1 Team	Reserve driver						
2026	IndyCar Series	Arrow McLaren	18	3	0	1	3	522	4th

^{†} Points only counted towards the Michelin Endurance Cup, and not the overall LMP2 Championship.

* Season still in progress.

=== Complete French F4 Championship results ===
(key) (Races in bold indicate pole position) (Races in italics indicate points for the fastest lap of top ten finishers)

Year	1	2	3	4	5	6	7	8	9	10	11	12	13	14	15	16	17	18	19	20	21	Rank	Points
2014	LMS; 1	LMS; 2	LMS; 3	PAU; 1	PAU; 2	PAU; 3	VDV; 1; 4	VDV; 2; 5	VDV; 3; 5	MAG; 1; 5	MAG; 2 Ret	MAG; 3; 11	NOG; 1; 4	NOG; 2; 6	NOG; 3; 5	JER; 1; 3	JER; 2; 8	JER; 3; 5	LEC; 1; 7	LEC; 2; 1	LEC; 3; 5	7th	143

=== Complete NACAM Formula 4 Championship results ===
(key) (Races in bold indicate pole position; races in italics indicate fastest lap)

Year	Team	1	2	3	4	5	6	7	8	9	10	11	12	13	14	15	16	17	18	19	20	21	DC	Points
2015–16	Martiga EG	PUE1; 1	PUE1; 2	PUE1; 3	AGS; 1	AGS; 2	AGS; 3	SLP; 1; 2	SLP; 2 NC	SLP; 3; 1	**EDM**; **1**; 1	EDM; 2; 1	**EDM**; **3**; 1	PUE2; 1; 2	PUE2; 2; 2	PUE2; 3; 3	MTY; 1; 1	MTY; 2; 1	MTY; 3; 2	MEX; 1	MEX; 2	MEX; 3	3rd	247

=== American open-wheel racing results ===
==== Pro Mazda Championship ====
Year	Team	1	2	3	4	5	6	7	8	9	10	11	12	13	14	15	16	17	Rank	Points
2015	Team Pelfrey	STP; 4	STP; 14	LOU; 4	LOU; C	BAR; 5	BAR; 7	IMS; 6	IMS; 10	IMS; 5	LOR; 7	TOR; 2	TOR; 3	IOW; 3	MOH; 7	MOH; 6	LAG; 18	LAG; 6	6th	250
2016	Team Pelfrey	**STP**; 1	STP; 2	BAR; 1	**BAR**; 1	**IMS**; 1	**IMS**; 1	**LOR**; 1	ROA; 4	ROA; 4	TOR; 9	TOR; 2	MOH; 7	MOH; 4	LAG; 1	LAG; 10	LAG; 6		2nd	393

==== Indy Lights ====
Year	Team	1	2	3	4	5	6	7	8	9	10	11	12	13	14	15	16	17	Rank	Points
2017	Team Pelfrey	STP; 5	STP; 3	ALA; 8	ALA; 15	IMS	IMS	INDY	ROA	ROA	IOW	TOR	TOR	MOH	MOH	GMP	WGL		15th	58
2018	Andretti Autosport	STP; 1	**STP**; 7	ALA; 1	**ALA**; 1	**IMS**; 4	**IMS**; 7	INDY; 2	RDA; 2	**RDA**; 4	**IOW**; 1	TOR; 1	TOR; 2	**MOH**; 1	**MOH**; 1	GTW; 3	**POR**; 1	POR; 1	1st	491

==== IndyCar Series ====
(key)

Year	Team	No.	Chassis	Engine	1	2	3	4	5	6	7	8	9	10	11	12	13	14	15	16	17	18	Rank	Points	Ref
2018	Harding Racing	8	Dallara DW12	Chevrolet	STP	PHX	LBH	ALA	IMS	INDY	DET	DET	TXS	ROA	IOW	TOR	MOH	POC	GTW	POR	SNM; 9		31st	44	
2019	Carlin	31	Dallara DW12	Chevrolet	STP	COA; 8	ALA; 16	LBH; 12	IMS; 19	INDY; DNQ	DET; 14	DET; 11	TXS	ROA; 17	TOR	IOW	MOH	POC	GTW	POR	LAG		26th	115	
2020	Arrow McLaren SP	5	Dallara DW12	Chevrolet	TXS; 12	IMS; 8	ROA; 8	**ROA**; 2*	IOW; 4	IOW; 12	INDY; 6	GTW; 3*	GTW; 2	MOH; 11	MOH; 9	IMS; 22	IMS; 5	STP; 2					4th	416	
2021	Arrow McLaren SP	5	Dallara DW12	Chevrolet	**ALA**; 4	STP; 19	TXS; 3	TXS; 1	IMS; 15	INDY; 4	**DET**; 3	DET; 1	ROA; 9	MOH; 8	NSH; 13	**IMS**; 5	GTW; 2	POR; 14	LAG; 5	LBH; 27			3rd	487	
2022	Arrow McLaren SP	5	Dallara DW12	Chevrolet	STP; 12	TXS; 15	LBH; 5	ALA; 1	IMS; 19	INDY; 2	DET; 5	ROA; 26	**MOH**; 24	TOR; 11	IOW; 2	IOW; 1	IMS; 12	NSH; 24	GTW; 4	POR; 4	LAG; 8		7th	480	
2023	Arrow McLaren	5	Dallara DW12	Chevrolet	STP; 2	TXS; 2	LBH; 17	ALA; 4	IMS; 2	INDY; 24*	DET; 26	ROA; 3	MOH; 8	TOR; 8	IOW; 3	IOW; 10	NSH; 8	IMS; 3	GTW; 2	POR; 4	LAG; 9		4th	484	
2024	Arrow McLaren	5	Dallara DW12	Chevrolet	STP; 1	THE; DNQ	LBH; 16	ALA; 23	IMS; 13	INDY; 2	DET; 7	ROA; 8	LAG; 8	MOH; 1	IOW; 2	IOW; 6	TOR; 17	GTW; 26	POR; 15	MIL; 1*	MIL; 24	NSH; 2	5th	460	
2025	Arrow McLaren	5	Dallara DW12	Chevrolet	STP; 11	**THE**; 2*	LBH; 13	ALA; 6	IMS; 2	INDY; 3	DET; 7	GTW; 2	ROA; 17	MOH; 5	IOW; 1	IOW; 5	TOR; 1	LAG; 4	POR; 25	MIL; 5	**NSH**; 24*		2nd	515	
2026	Arrow McLaren	5	Dallara DW12	Chevrolet	STP; 5	PHX; 4	ARL; 5	ALA; 17	LBH; 5	IMS; 18	INDY; 4	DET; 4	GTW; 11	ROA; 12	MOH; 1*	NSH; 7	POR; 11	MRK; 5	WSH; 16	MIL; 1*	MIL; 1	LAG; 11	4th	522	

* Season still in progress.

==== Indianapolis 500 ====
Year	Chassis	Engine	Start	Finish	Team
2019	Dallara	Chevrolet	DNQ		Carlin
2020	Dallara	Chevrolet	15	6	Arrow McLaren SP
2021	Dallara	Chevrolet	12	4	Arrow McLaren SP
2022	Dallara	Chevrolet	7	2	Arrow McLaren SP
2023	Dallara	Chevrolet	8	24	Arrow McLaren
2024	Dallara	Chevrolet	8	2	Arrow McLaren
2025	Dallara	Chevrolet	3	3	Arrow McLaren
2026	Dallara	Chevrolet	6	4	Arrow McLaren

=== Complete IMSA SportsCar Championship results ===
Year	Entrant	Class	Chassis	Engine	1	2	3	4	5	6	7	8	9	10	Rank	Points
2017	Performance Tech Motorsports	PC	Oreca FLM09	Chevrolet LS3 6.2 L V8	DAY; 1	SEB; 1	COA; 1	DET; 1	WAT; 1	MOS; 1	ELK; 1	PET; 3			1st	283
2018	Performance Tech Motorsports	P	Oreca 07	Gibson GK428 4.2 L V8	DAY; 8	SEB; 13	LBH	MOH	DET	WGL	MOS	ELK	LGA	PET	41st	41
2022	DragonSpeed USA	LMP2	Oreca 07	Gibson GK428 4.2 L V8	DAY; 1†	SEB	LGA	MOH	WGL	ELK	PET				NC†	0†
2024	United Autosports USA	LMP2	Oreca 07	Gibson GK428 4.2 L V8	**DAY**; 6	SEB	WGL	MOS	ELK	IMS	PET				42nd	285

^{†} Points only counted towards the Michelin Endurance Cup, and not the overall LMP2 Championship.

=== Complete FIA Formula 2 Championship results ===
(key) (Races in bold indicate pole position) (Races in italics indicate points for the fastest lap of top ten finishers)

Year	Entrant	1	2	3	4	5	6	7	8	9	10	11	12	13	14	15	16	17	18	19	20	21	22	23	24	DC	Points
2019	MP Motorsport	BHR; FEA	BHR; SPR	BAK; FEA	BAK; SPR	CAT; FEA	CAT; SPR	MON; FEA	MON; SPR	LEC; FEA	LEC; SPR	RBR; FEA; 19	RBR; SPR; 14	SIL; FEA	SIL; SPR	HUN; FEA	HUN; SPR	SPA; FEA	SPA; SPR	MNZ; FEA	MNZ; SPR	SOC; FEA	SOC; SPR	YMC; FEA	YMC; SPR	26th	0

=== Complete Super Formula results ===
(key) (Races in bold indicate pole position) (Races in italics indicate fastest lap)

Year	Team	Engine	1	2	3	4	5	6	7	DC	Points
2019	Team Mugen	Honda	SUZ	AUT	SUG	FUJ; 14	MOT; 14	OKA; 6	SUZ	18th	3

=== Complete Formula One participations ===
(key) (Races in bold indicate pole position) (Races in italics indicate fastest lap)

Year	Entrant	Chassis	Engine	1	2	3	4	5	6	7	8	9	10	11	12	13	14	15	16	17	18	19	20	21	22	23	24	WDC	Points
2022	McLaren F1 Team	McLaren MCL36	Mercedes AMG M13 E Performance 1.6 V6 t	BHR	SAU	AUS	EMI	MIA	ESP	MON	AZE	CAN	GBR	AUT	FRA	HUN	BEL	NED	ITA	SIN	JPN	USA	MXC	SAP	ABU; TD			–	–
2023	McLaren F1 Team	McLaren MCL60	Mercedes AMG M14 E Performance 1.6 V6 t	BHR	SAU	AUS	AZE	MIA	MON	ESP	CAN	AUT	GBR	HUN	BEL	NED	ITA	SIN	JPN	QAT	USA	MXC	SAP	LVG	ABU; TD			–	–
2024	McLaren F1 Team	McLaren MCL38	Mercedes AMG M15 E Performance 1.6 V6 t	BHR	SAU	AUS	JPN	CHN	MIA	EMI	MON	CAN	ESP	AUT	GBR	HUN	BEL	NED	ITA	AZE	SIN	USA	MXC; TD	SAP	LVG	QAT	ABU	–	–
2025	McLaren F1 Team	McLaren MCL39	Mercedes-AMG M16 E Performance 1.6 V6 t	AUS	CHN	JPN	BHR	SAU	MIA	EMI	MON	ESP	CAN	AUT	GBR	BEL	HUN	NED	ITA	AZE	SIN	USA	MXC; TD	SAP	LVG	QAT	ABU; TD	–	–

Sporting positions
Preceded by Alex Popow; Renger van der Zande	IMSA SportsCar Championship; PC Champion; 2017; With: James French	Class discontinued
Preceded by Tom Kimber-Smith; José Gutiérrez; Robert Alon	North American Endurance Cup; PC Champion; 2017; With: James French; Kyle Masson	Class discontinued
Preceded by Kyle Kaiser	Indy Lights; Champion; 2018	Succeeded by Oliver Askew
Preceded by Santino Ferrucci	Indianapolis 500; Rookie of the Year; 2020	Succeeded by Scott McLaughlin
