= 2023 Bommarito Automotive Group 500 =

Indycar race held in Madison, Illinois

(United States) 2023 Bommarito Automotive Group 500
Race details
15th round of the 2023 IndyCar season
← Previous race	Next race →
- Layout of the World Wide Technology Raceway
- Date: August 27, 2023
- Official name: Bommarito Automotive Group 500
- Location: World Wide Technology Raceway, Madison, Illinois
- Course: Permanent racing facility 1.25 mi / 2.01 km
- Distance: 260 laps 325 mi / 523 km

Pole position
- Driver: (New Zealand) Scott McLaughlin (Team Penske)
- Time: 00:49.1936 (total time from 2 laps)

Fastest lap
- Driver: (Sweden) Linus Lundqvist (Meyer Shank Racing)
- Time: 00:25.6786 (on lap 62 of 260)

Podium
- First: (New Zealand) Scott Dixon (Chip Ganassi Racing)
- Second: (Mexico) Pato O'Ward (Arrow McLaren)
- Third: (United States) David Malukas (Dale Coyne Racing with HMD Motorsports)

Chronology
Previous	Next
2022	2024

The 2023 Bommarito Automotive Group 500 was the fifteenth round of the 2023 IndyCar season. The race was held on August 27, 2023, in Madison, Illinois at the World Wide Technology Raceway. The race consisted of 260 laps & was won by Scott Dixon.

The race marked the first time that the Firestone alternate tires were used at an oval. Teams had 10 sets of tires they could use during the weekend, divided between 8 primary tire sets & 2 alternate sets. Teams were allowed the use of 1 set of alternate tires during first practice and, similar to road/street races, were mandated to use 1 set during the race. No alternate tires were allowed to be used during qualifying.

== Entry list ==
Key	Meaning
R	Rookie
W	Past winner

No.	Driver	Team	Engine
2	(United States) Josef Newgarden W	Team Penske	Chevrolet
3	(New Zealand) Scott McLaughlin	Team Penske	Chevrolet
5	(Mexico) Pato O'Ward	Arrow McLaren	Chevrolet
06	(Brazil) Hélio Castroneves W	Meyer Shank Racing	Honda
6	(Sweden) Felix Rosenqvist	Arrow McLaren	Chevrolet
7	(United States) Alexander Rossi	Arrow McLaren	Chevrolet
8	(Sweden) Marcus Ericsson	Chip Ganassi Racing	Honda
9	(New Zealand) Scott Dixon W	Chip Ganassi Racing	Honda
10	(Spain) Álex Palou	Chip Ganassi Racing	Honda
11	(Japan) Takuma Sato W	Chip Ganassi Racing	Honda
12	(Australia) Will Power W	Team Penske	Chevrolet
14	(United States) Santino Ferrucci	A. J. Foyt Enterprises	Chevrolet
15	(United States) Graham Rahal	Rahal Letterman Lanigan Racing	Honda
18	(United States) David Malukas	Dale Coyne Racing with HMD Motorsports	Honda
20	(United States) Ryan Hunter-Reay	Ed Carpenter Racing	Chevrolet
21	(Netherlands) Rinus VeeKay	Ed Carpenter Racing	Chevrolet
26	(United States) Colton Herta	Andretti Autosport with Curb-Agajanian	Honda
27	(United States) Kyle Kirkwood	Andretti Autosport	Honda
28	(France) Romain Grosjean	Andretti Autosport	Honda
29	(Canada) Devlin DeFrancesco	Andretti Steinbrenner Autosport	Honda
30	(United States) Conor Daly	Rahal Letterman Lanigan Racing	Honda
33	(United States) Ed Carpenter	Ed Carpenter Racing	Chevrolet
45	(Denmark) Christian Lundgaard	Rahal Letterman Lanigan Racing	Honda
51	(United States) Sting Ray Robb R	Dale Coyne Racing with Rick Ware Racing	Honda
55	(Denmark) Benjamin Pedersen R	A. J. Foyt Enterprises	Chevrolet
60	(Sweden) Linus Lundqvist R	Meyer Shank Racing	Honda
77	(United Kingdom) Callum Ilott	Juncos Hollinger Racing	Chevrolet
78	(Argentina) Agustín Canapino R	Juncos Hollinger Racing	Chevrolet

== Practice ==
=== Practice 1 ===
Top Practice Speeds
Pos	No.	Driver	Team	Engine	Lap Time
1	2	(United States) Josef Newgarden W	Team Penske	Chevrolet	00:24.9944
2	3	(New Zealand) Scott McLaughlin	Team Penske	Chevrolet	00:25.0902
3	11	(Japan) Takuma Sato W	Chip Ganassi Racing	Honda	00:25.1107

== Qualifying ==
Due to inclement weather, qualifying was moved to 11:00AM ET on August 27, 2023. Originally, qualifying was scheduled for 2:00 PM ET on August 26.

=== Qualifying classification ===
Pos	No.	Driver	Team	Engine	Lap 1	Lap 2	Total Time	Final grid
1	3	(New Zealand) Scott McLaughlin	Team Penske	Chevrolet	24.6564	24.5372	00:49.1936	10 (Note: Scott McLaughlin, Scott Dixon, Takuma Sato, Kyle Kirkwood & rookie Agustin Canapino each received a nine-place grid penalty due to unapproved engine changes after the Gallager GP.)
2	2	(United States) Josef Newgarden **W**	Team Penske	Chevrolet	24.7106	24.6342	00:49.3448	1
3	26	(United States) Colton Herta	Andretti Autosport with Curb-Agajanian	Honda	24.7348	24.7303	00:49.4651	2
4	5	(Mexico) Pato O'Ward	Arrow McLaren	Chevrolet	24.7549	24.7714	00:49.5263	3
5	10	(Spain) Álex Palou	Chip Ganassi Racing	Honda	24.7871	24.7726	00:49.5597	14 (Note: Álex Palou received a nine-place grid penalty due to unapproved engine change prior to qualifying.)
6	6	(Sweden) Felix Rosenqvist	Arrow McLaren	Chevrolet	24.8476	24.7235	00:49.5711	4
7	9	(New Zealand) Scott Dixon **W**	Chip Ganassi Racing	Honda	24.8145	24.7880	00:49.6025	16
8	11	(Japan) Takuma Sato **W**	Chip Ganassi Racing	Honda	24.8253	24.7815	00:49.6068	17
9	28	(France) Romain Grosjean	Andretti Autosport	Honda	24.8447	24.7629	00:49.6076	5
10	18	(United States) David Malukas	Dale Coyne Racing with HMD Motorsports	Honda	24.8720	24.8267	00:49.6987	6
11	7	(United States) Alexander Rossi	Arrow McLaren	Chevrolet	24.8635	24.8670	00:49.7305	7
12	12	(Australia) Will Power **W**	Team Penske	Chevrolet	24.8929	24.8456	00:49.7385	8
13	27	(United States) Kyle Kirkwood	Andretti Autosport	Honda	24.9159	24.9202	00:49.8361	22
14	77	(United Kingdom) Callum Ilott	Juncos Hollinger Racing	Chevrolet	25.0563	24.8860	00:49.9423	9
15	30	(United States) Conor Daly	Rahal Letterman Lanigan Racing	Honda	25.0600	24.9600	00:50.0200	11
16	60	(Sweden) Linus Lundqvist **R**	Meyer Shank Racing	Honda	25.0481	25.0069	00:50.0550	12
17	06	(Brazil) Hélio Castroneves **W**	Meyer Shank Racing	Honda	25.1409	24.9964	00:50.1373	13
18	8	(Sweden) Marcus Ericsson	Chip Ganassi Racing	Honda	25.1760	25.1311	00:50.3071	15
19	29	(Canada) Devlin DeFrancesco	Andretti Steinbrenner Autosport	Honda	25.1702	25.1483	00:50.3185	18
20	45	(Denmark) Christian Lundgaard	Rahal Letterman Lanigan Racing	Honda	25.1649	25.1610	00:50.3259	19
21	78	(Argentina) Agustín Canapino **R**	Juncos Hollinger Racing	Chevrolet	25.2154	25.2077	00:50.4231	28
22	21	(Netherlands) Rinus VeeKay	Ed Carpenter Racing	Chevrolet	25.2811	25.1717	00:50.4528	20
23	15	(United States) Graham Rahal	Rahal Letterman Lanigan Racing	Honda	25.3041	25.1557	00:50.4598	21
24	20	(United States) Ryan Hunter-Reay	Ed Carpenter Racing	Chevrolet	25.3705	25.1512	00:50.5217	23
25	51	(United States) Sting Ray Robb **R**	Dale Coyne Racing with Rick Ware Racing	Honda	25.4595	25.1615	00:50.6210	24
26	55	(Denmark) Benjamin Pedersen **R**	A. J. Foyt Enterprises	Chevrolet	25.4956	25.4251	00:50.9207	25
27	14	(United States) Santino Ferrucci	A. J. Foyt Enterprises	Chevrolet	24.9565	26.0295	00:50.9860	26
28	33	(United States) Ed Carpenter	Ed Carpenter Racing	Chevrolet	25.8225	25.7614	00:51.5839	27

Notes

- **Bold text** indicates fastest time set in session.

== Race ==
The race started at 3:40 PM ET on August 27, 2023.

=== Race classification ===
Pos	No.	Driver	Team	Engine	Laps	Time/Retired	Pit Stops	Grid	Laps Led	Pts.
1	9	(New Zealand) Scott Dixon W	Chip Ganassi Racing	Honda	260	02:10:09.4046	3	16	123	53
2	5	(Mexico) Pato O'Ward	Arrow McLaren	Chevrolet	260	+22.2256	5	3	18	41
3	18	(United States) David Malukas	Dale Coyne Racing with HMD Motorsports	Honda	260	+22.7279	5	6		35
4	7	(United States) Alexander Rossi	Arrow McLaren	Chevrolet	259	+1 Lap	5	7	4	33
5	3	(New Zealand) Scott McLaughlin	Team Penske	Chevrolet	259	+1 Lap	5	10		31
6	26	(United States) Colton Herta	Andretti Autosport with Curb-Agajanian	Honda	259	+1 Lap	5	2	13	29
7	10	(Spain) Álex Palou	Chip Ganassi Racing	Honda	259	+1 Lap	5	14		26
8	6	(Sweden) Felix Rosenqvist	Arrow McLaren	Chevrolet	259	+1 Lap	5	4		24
9	12	(Australia) Will Power W	Team Penske	Chevrolet	259	+1 Lap	5	8	4	23
10	8	(Sweden) Marcus Ericsson	Chip Ganassi Racing	Honda	259	+1 Lap	6	15		20
11	21	(Netherlands) Rinus VeeKay	Ed Carpenter Racing	Chevrolet	259	+1 Lap	4	20		19
12	28	(France) Romain Grosjean	Andretti Autosport	Honda	259	+1 Lap	4	5		18
13	14	(United States) Santino Ferrucci	A. J. Foyt Enterprises	Chevrolet	259	+1 Lap	5	26		17
14	20	(United States) Ryan Hunter-Reay	Ed Carpenter Racing	Chevrolet	259	+1 Lap	5	23		16
15	27	(United States) Kyle Kirkwood	Andretti Autosport	Honda	259	+1 Lap	5	22		15
16	30	(United States) Conor Daly	Rahal Letterman Lanigan Racing	Honda	259	+1 Lap	5	11		14
17	45	(Denmark) Christian Lundgaard	Rahal Letterman Lanigan Racing	Honda	259	+1 Lap	5	19		13
18	60	(Sweden) Linus Lundqvist R	Meyer Shank Racing	Honda	258	+2 Laps	5	12		12
19	29	(Canada) Devlin DeFrancesco	Andretti Steinbrenner Autosport	Honda	258	+2 Laps	5	18		11
20	15	(United States) Graham Rahal	Rahal Letterman Lanigan Racing	Honda	258	+2 Laps	5	21		10
21	51	(United States) Sting Ray Robb R	Dale Coyne Racing with Rick Ware Racing	Honda	258	+2 Laps	4	24		9
22	78	(Argentina) Agustín Canapino R	Juncos Hollinger Racing	Chevrolet	258	+2 Laps	7	28		8
23	06	(Brazil) Hélio Castroneves W	Meyer Shank Racing	Honda	257	+3 Laps	5	13		7
24	33	(United States) Ed Carpenter	Ed Carpenter Racing	Chevrolet	254	+6 Laps	6	27		6
25	2	(United States) Josef Newgarden W	Team Penske	Chevrolet	210	Contact	5	1	98	6
26	11	(Japan) Takuma Sato W	Chip Ganassi Racing	Honda	119	Contact	2	17		5
27	77	(United Kingdom) Callum Ilott	Juncos Hollinger Racing	Chevrolet	58	Contact	1	9		5
28	55	(Denmark) Benjamin Pedersen R	A. J. Foyt Enterprises	Chevrolet	0	Contact	0	25		5
Fastest lap: (Sweden) Linus Lundqvist (Meyer Shank Racing) – 00:25.6786 (lap 62)

== Championship standings after the race ==
Drivers' Championship standings

	Pos.	Driver	Points
Unchanged	1	(Spain) Álex Palou	565
Unchanged	2	(New Zealand) Scott Dixon	491
Unchanged	3	(United States) Josef Newgarden	440
1	4	(Mexico) Pato O'Ward	429
1	5	(New Zealand) Scott McLaughlin	426

Engine manufacturer standings

	Pos.	Manufacturer	Points
Unchanged	1	Honda	1267
Unchanged	2	Chevrolet	1256

- Note: Only the top five positions are included.

== Footnotes ==
Previous race: 2023 Gallagher Grand Prix	IndyCar Series; 2023 season	Next race: 2023 BitNile.com Grand Prix of Portland
Previous race: 2022 Bommarito Automotive Group 500	Bommarito Automotive Group 500	Next race: 2024 Bommarito Automotive Group 500
