= 2023 Hy-Vee IndyCar Race Weekend =

Indycar race held in Newton, Iowa

(United States) 2023 Hy-Vee IndyCar Race Weekend
Race details
11th and 12th round of the 2023 IndyCar season
← Previous race	Next race →
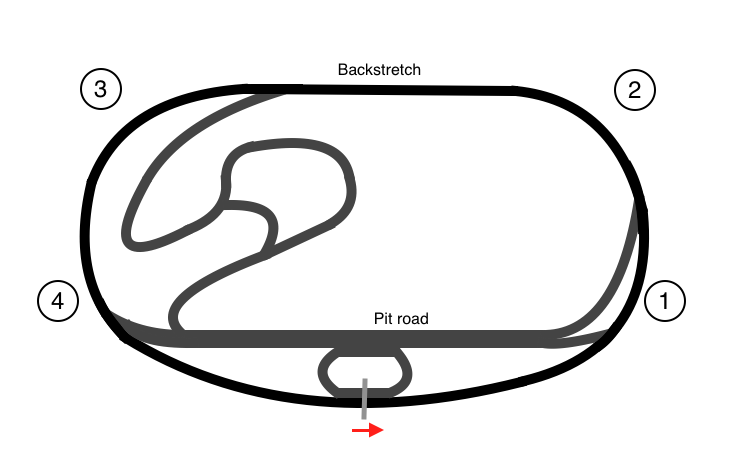
- Layout of the Iowa Speedway circuit
- Date: July 22–23, 2023
- Official name: Hy-Vee IndyCar Race Weekend
- Location: Iowa Speedway
- Course: Permanent racing facility 0.894 mi / 1.439 km
- Distance: Both 250 laps 223.5 mi / 359.688 km
Race 1

Pole position
- Driver: (Australia) Will Power (Team Penske)
- Time: 00:17.7395

Fastest lap
- Driver: (New Zealand) Scott McLaughlin (Team Penske)
- Time: 00:18.8622 (on lap 210 of 250)

Podium
- First: (United States) Josef Newgarden (Team Penske)
- Second: (New Zealand) Scott McLaughlin (Team Penske)
- Third: (Mexico) Pato O'Ward (Arrow McLaren)
Race 2

Pole position
- Driver: (Australia) Will Power (Team Penske)
- Time: 00:17.7246

Fastest lap
- Driver: (Australia) Will Power (Team Penske)
- Time: 00:18.9980 (on lap 108 of 250)

Podium
- First: (United States) Josef Newgarden (Team Penske)
- Second: (Australia) Will Power (Team Penske)
- Third: (Spain) Álex Palou (Chip Ganassi Racing)

Chronology
Previous	Next
2022	2024

The 2023 Hy-Vee IndyCar Race Weekend was a pair of IndyCar motor races held on July 22, 2023, and July 23, 2023, at Iowa Speedway in Newton, Iowa. They were the 11th and 12th rounds of the 2023 IndyCar season. The race weekend has been held since 2007, except for a brief hiatus in 2021 after a change of focus by the owner of the track.

The first race (officially the Hy-Vee Homefront 250 presented by Instacart) was held on July 22, 2023, with the second (officially the Hy-Vee One Step 250 presented by Gatorade) being held on July 23, 2023. Each race consisted of 250 laps and were both won by Josef Newgarden.

Each race was accompanied with concerts before and after it with Carrie Underwood and Kenny Chesney performing on Saturday, and Zac Brown Band and Ed Sheeran performing on Sunday.

== Race 1 - Hy-Vee Homefront 250 presented by Instacart ==
=== Entry list ===
Key	Meaning
R	Rookie
W	Past winner

No.	Driver	Team	Engine
2	(United States) Josef Newgarden W	Team Penske	Chevrolet
3	(New Zealand) Scott McLaughlin	Team Penske	Chevrolet
5	(Mexico) Pato O'Ward W	Arrow McLaren	Chevrolet
06	(Brazil) Hélio Castroneves W	Meyer Shank Racing	Honda
6	(Sweden) Felix Rosenqvist	Arrow McLaren	Chevrolet
7	(United States) Alexander Rossi	Arrow McLaren	Chevrolet
8	(Sweden) Marcus Ericsson	Chip Ganassi Racing	Honda
9	(New Zealand) Scott Dixon	Chip Ganassi Racing	Honda
10	(Spain) Álex Palou	Chip Ganassi Racing	Honda
11	(Japan) Takuma Sato	Chip Ganassi Racing	Honda
12	(Australia) Will Power	Team Penske	Chevrolet
14	(United States) Santino Ferrucci	A. J. Foyt Enterprises	Chevrolet
15	(United States) Graham Rahal	Rahal Letterman Lanigan Racing	Honda
18	(United States) David Malukas	Dale Coyne Racing with HMD Motorsports	Honda
20	(United States) Ryan Hunter-Reay W	Ed Carpenter Racing	Chevrolet
21	(Netherlands) Rinus VeeKay	Ed Carpenter Racing	Chevrolet
26	(United States) Colton Herta	Andretti Autosport with Curb-Agajanian	Honda
27	(United States) Kyle Kirkwood	Andretti Autosport	Honda
28	(France) Romain Grosjean	Andretti Autosport	Honda
29	(Canada) Devlin DeFrancesco	Andretti Steinbrenner Autosport	Honda
30	(United Kingdom) Jack Harvey	Rahal Letterman Lanigan Racing	Honda
33	(United States) Ed Carpenter	Ed Carpenter Racing	Chevrolet
45	(Denmark) Christian Lundgaard	Rahal Letterman Lanigan Racing	Honda
51	(United States) Sting Ray Robb R	Dale Coyne Racing with Rick Ware Racing	Honda
55	(Denmark) Benjamin Pedersen R	A. J. Foyt Enterprises	Chevrolet
60	(United States) Conor Daly	Meyer Shank Racing	Honda
77	(United Kingdom) Callum Ilott	Juncos Hollinger Racing	Chevrolet
78	(Argentina) Agustín Canapino R	Juncos Hollinger Racing	Chevrolet

=== Practice ===
Top Practice Speeds
Pos	No.	Driver	Team	Engine	Lap Time
1	2	(United States) Josef Newgarden W	Team Penske	Chevrolet	00:18.2420
2	3	(New Zealand) Scott McLaughlin	Team Penske	Chevrolet	00:18.2897
3	8	(Sweden) Marcus Ericsson	Chip Ganassi Racing	Honda	00:18.2992

=== Qualifying ===
Qualifying for Race 1 was scheduled to start at 9:30 AM ET on July 22, 2023 however a downpour hit the track just before qualifying was due to start, resulting in a delayed start of almost two hours. Each entrant turned two consecutive laps, with their first lap time counting towards Race 1 qualifying.

==== Qualifying classification ====
Pos	No.	Driver	Team	Engine	Lap 1	Lap 2	Total Time	Final grid
1	12	(Australia) Will Power	Team Penske	Chevrolet	None	None	00:17.7395	1
2	3	(New Zealand) Scott McLaughlin	Team Penske	Chevrolet	None	None	00:17.8469	2
3	2	(United States) Josef Newgarden W	Team Penske	Chevrolet	None	None	00:17.8720	3
4	9	(New Zealand) Scott Dixon	Chip Ganassi Racing	Honda	None	None	00:18.0091	4
5	5	(Mexico) Pato O'Ward W	Arrow McLaren	Chevrolet	None	None	00:18.0414	5
6	26	(United States) Colton Herta	Andretti Autosport with Curb-Agajanian	Honda	None	None	00:18.0535	6
7	10	(Spain) Álex Palou	Chip Ganassi Racing	Honda	None	None	00:18.0601	7
8	28	(France) Romain Grosjean	Andretti Autosport	Honda	None	None	00:18.0786	8
9	18	(United States) David Malukas	Dale Coyne Racing with HMD Motorsports	Honda	None	None	00:18.0808	9
10	8	(Sweden) Marcus Ericsson	Chip Ganassi Racing	Honda	None	None	00:18.0880	10
11	11	(Japan) Takuma Sato	Chip Ganassi Racing	Honda	None	None	00:18.0998	11
12	29	(Canada) Devlin DeFrancesco	Andretti Steinbrenner Autosport	Honda	None	None	00:18.1288	12
13	15	(United States) Graham Rahal	Rahal Letterman Lanigan Racing	Honda	None	None	00:18.1653	13
14	06	(Brazil) Hélio Castroneves W	Meyer Shank Racing	Honda	None	None	00:18.1671	14
15	21	(Netherlands) Rinus VeeKay	Ed Carpenter Racing	Chevrolet	None	None	00:18.1826	15
16	20	(United States) Ryan Hunter-Reay W	Ed Carpenter Racing	Chevrolet	None	None	00:18.2062	16
17	30	(United Kingdom) Jack Harvey	Rahal Letterman Lanigan Racing	Honda	None	None	00:18.2095	26 (Note: Jack Harvey received a nine-place grid penalty due to avoidable contact during the previous round.)
18	27	(United States) Kyle Kirkwood	Andretti Autosport	Honda	None	None	00:18.2133	17
19	33	(United States) Ed Carpenter	Ed Carpenter Racing	Chevrolet	None	None	00:18.2237	18
20	45	(Denmark) Christian Lundgaard	Rahal Letterman Lanigan Racing	Honda	None	None	00:18.2450	19
21	7	(United States) Alexander Rossi	Arrow McLaren	Chevrolet	None	None	00:18.3005	20
22	6	(Sweden) Felix Rosenqvist	Arrow McLaren	Chevrolet	None	None	00:18.3109	21
23	60	(United States) Conor Daly	Meyer Shank Racing	Honda	None	None	00:18.3249	22
24	77	(United Kingdom) Callum Ilott	Juncos Hollinger Racing	Chevrolet	None	None	00:18.3334	23
25	78	(Argentina) Agustín Canapino R	Juncos Hollinger Racing	Chevrolet	None	None	00:18.3862	24
26	14	(United States) Santino Ferrucci	A. J. Foyt Enterprises	Chevrolet	None	None	00:18.4367	25
27	51	(United States) Sting Ray Robb R	Dale Coyne Racing with Rick Ware Racing	Honda	None	None	00:18.7725	27
28	55	(Denmark) Benjamin Pedersen R	A. J. Foyt Enterprises	Chevrolet	None	None	No Time (Note: Benjamin Pedersen was disallowed to partake in qualifying due to his car failing morning inspections.)	28

=== Race ===
The race started at 3:06 PM ET on July 22, 2023.

==== Race classification ====
Pos	No.	Driver	Team	Engine	Laps	Time/Retired	Pit Stops	Grid	Laps Led	Pts.
1	2	(United States) Josef Newgarden W	Team Penske	Chevrolet	250	01:33:40.4758	4	3	129	53
2	3	(New Zealand) Scott McLaughlin	Team Penske	Chevrolet	250	+3.3755	4	2		40
3	5	(Mexico) Pato O'Ward W	Arrow McLaren	Chevrolet	250	+9.6072	4	5		35
4	8	(Sweden) Marcus Ericsson	Chip Ganassi Racing	Honda	250	+14.6385	4	10		32
5	12	(Australia) Will Power	Team Penske	Chevrolet	250	+22.4025	4	1	119	32
6	9	(New Zealand) Scott Dixon	Chip Ganassi Racing	Honda	249	+1 Lap	4	4		28
7	27	(United States) Kyle Kirkwood	Andretti Autosport	Honda	249	+1 Lap	4	17		26
8	10	(Spain) Álex Palou	Chip Ganassi Racing	Honda	249	+1 Lap	4	7	1	25
9	11	(Japan) Takuma Sato	Chip Ganassi Racing	Honda	249	+1 Lap	4	11	1	23
10	7	(United States) Alexander Rossi	Arrow McLaren	Chevrolet	249	+1 Lap	4	20		20
11	28	(France) Romain Grosjean	Andretti Autosport	Honda	249	+1 Lap	4	8		19
12	18	(United States) David Malukas	Dale Coyne Racing with HMD Motorsports	Honda	248	+2 Laps	4	9		18
13	6	(Sweden) Felix Rosenqvist	Arrow McLaren	Chevrolet	248	+2 Laps	4	21		17
14	06	(Brazil) Hélio Castroneves W	Meyer Shank Racing	Honda	248	+2 Laps	4	14		16
15	77	(United Kingdom) Callum Ilott	Juncos Hollinger Racing	Chevrolet	247	+3 Laps	4	23		15
16	78	(Argentina) Agustín Canapino R	Juncos Hollinger Racing	Chevrolet	247	+3 Laps	4	24		14
17	21	(Netherlands) Rinus VeeKay	Ed Carpenter Racing	Chevrolet	247	+3 Laps	4	15		13
18	30	(United Kingdom) Jack Harvey	Rahal Letterman Lanigan Racing	Honda	247	+3 Laps	4	26		12
19	26	(United States) Colton Herta	Andretti Autosport with Curb-Agajanian	Honda	246	+4 Laps	4	6		11
20	45	(Denmark) Christian Lundgaard	Rahal Letterman Lanigan Racing	Honda	246	+4 Laps	4	19		10
21	60	(United States) Conor Daly	Meyer Shank Racing	Honda	245	+5 Laps	4	22		9
22	29	(Canada) Devlin DeFrancesco	Andretti Steinbrenner Autosport	Honda	245	+5 Laps	4	12		8
23	20	(United States) Ryan Hunter-Reay W	Ed Carpenter Racing	Chevrolet	244	+6 Laps	4	16		7
24	33	(United States) Ed Carpenter	Ed Carpenter Racing	Chevrolet	243	+7 Laps	4	18		6
25	51	(United States) Sting Ray Robb R	Dale Coyne Racing with Rick Ware Racing	Honda	242	+8 Laps	6	27		5
26	14	(United States) Santino Ferrucci	A. J. Foyt Enterprises	Chevrolet	241	+9 Laps	5	25		5
27	55	(Denmark) Benjamin Pedersen R	A. J. Foyt Enterprises	Chevrolet	235	+15 Laps	5	28		5
28	15	(United States) Graham Rahal	Rahal Letterman Lanigan Racing	Honda	149	Contact	2	13		5
Fastest lap: (New Zealand) Scott McLaughlin (Team Penske) – 00:18.8622 (lap 210)

=== Championship standings after the race ===
Drivers' Championship standings

	Pos.	Driver	Points
Unchanged	1	(Spain) Álex Palou	442
1	2	(United States) Josef Newgarden	344
1	3	(New Zealand) Scott Dixon	328
1	4	(Mexico) Pato O'Ward	309
1	5	(Sweden) Marcus Ericsson	307

Engine manufacturer standings

	Pos.	Manufacturer	Points
Unchanged	1	Honda	915
Unchanged	2	Chevrolet	847

- Note: Only the top five positions are included.

== Race 2 - Hy-Vee One Step 250 presented by Gatorade ==
=== Entry list ===
The entry list for Race 2 was the same as for Race 1.

Key	Meaning
R	Rookie
W	Past winner

No.	Driver	Team	Engine
2	(United States) Josef Newgarden W	Team Penske	Chevrolet
3	(New Zealand) Scott McLaughlin	Team Penske	Chevrolet
5	(Mexico) Pato O'Ward W	Arrow McLaren	Chevrolet
06	(Brazil) Hélio Castroneves W	Meyer Shank Racing	Honda
6	(Sweden) Felix Rosenqvist	Arrow McLaren	Chevrolet
7	(United States) Alexander Rossi	Arrow McLaren	Chevrolet
8	(Sweden) Marcus Ericsson	Chip Ganassi Racing	Honda
9	(New Zealand) Scott Dixon	Chip Ganassi Racing	Honda
10	(Spain) Álex Palou	Chip Ganassi Racing	Honda
11	(Japan) Takuma Sato	Chip Ganassi Racing	Honda
12	(Australia) Will Power	Team Penske	Chevrolet
14	(United States) Santino Ferrucci	A. J. Foyt Enterprises	Chevrolet
15	(United States) Graham Rahal	Rahal Letterman Lanigan Racing	Honda
18	(United States) David Malukas	Dale Coyne Racing with HMD Motorsports	Honda
20	(United States) Ryan Hunter-Reay W	Ed Carpenter Racing	Chevrolet
21	(Netherlands) Rinus VeeKay	Ed Carpenter Racing	Chevrolet
26	(United States) Colton Herta	Andretti Autosport with Curb-Agajanian	Honda
27	(United States) Kyle Kirkwood	Andretti Autosport	Honda
28	(France) Romain Grosjean	Andretti Autosport	Honda
29	(Canada) Devlin DeFrancesco	Andretti Steinbrenner Autosport	Honda
30	(United Kingdom) Jack Harvey	Rahal Letterman Lanigan Racing	Honda
33	(United States) Ed Carpenter	Ed Carpenter Racing	Chevrolet
45	(Denmark) Christian Lundgaard	Rahal Letterman Lanigan Racing	Honda
51	(United States) Sting Ray Robb R	Dale Coyne Racing with Rick Ware Racing	Honda
55	(Denmark) Benjamin Pedersen R	A. J. Foyt Enterprises	Chevrolet
60	(United States) Conor Daly	Meyer Shank Racing	Honda
77	(United Kingdom) Callum Ilott	Juncos Hollinger Racing	Chevrolet
78	(Argentina) Agustín Canapino R	Juncos Hollinger Racing	Chevrolet

=== Qualifying ===
Qualifying for Race 2 took place at the same time as for Race 1, with each entrant's second of two lap times counting towards Race 2 qualifying.

==== Qualifying classification ====
Pos	No.	Driver	Team	Engine	Lap 1	Lap 2	Total Time	Final grid
1	12	(Australia) Will Power	Team Penske	Chevrolet	None	None	00:17.7246	1
2	3	(New Zealand) Scott McLaughlin	Team Penske	Chevrolet	None	None	00:17.9163	2
3	18	(United States) David Malukas	Dale Coyne Racing with HMD Motorsports	Honda	None	None	00:18.0191	3
4	33	(United States) Ed Carpenter	Ed Carpenter Racing	Chevrolet	None	None	00:18.0595	4
5	26	(United States) Colton Herta	Andretti Autosport with Curb-Agajanian	Honda	None	None	00:18.0783	5
6	15	(United States) Graham Rahal	Rahal Letterman Lanigan Racing	Honda	None	None	00:18.0851	6
7	2	(United States) Josef Newgarden W	Team Penske	Chevrolet	None	None	00:18.0948	7
8	06	(Brazil) Hélio Castroneves W	Meyer Shank Racing	Honda	None	None	00:18.1094	8
9	9	(New Zealand) Scott Dixon	Chip Ganassi Racing	Honda	None	None	00:18.1129	9
10	8	(Sweden) Marcus Ericsson	Chip Ganassi Racing	Honda	None	None	00:18.1134	10
11	5	(Mexico) Pato O'Ward W	Arrow McLaren	Chevrolet	None	None	00:18.1608	11
12	10	(Spain) Álex Palou	Chip Ganassi Racing	Honda	None	None	00:18.1699	12
13	11	(Japan) Takuma Sato	Chip Ganassi Racing	Honda	None	None	00:18.1830	13
14	21	(Netherlands) Rinus VeeKay	Ed Carpenter Racing	Chevrolet	None	None	00:18.1904	14
15	60	(United States) Conor Daly	Meyer Shank Racing	Honda	None	None	00:18.1911	15
16	6	(Sweden) Felix Rosenqvist	Arrow McLaren	Chevrolet	None	None	00:18.1991	16
17	27	(United States) Kyle Kirkwood	Andretti Autosport	Honda	None	None	00:18.2137	17
18	7	(United States) Alexander Rossi	Arrow McLaren	Chevrolet	None	None	00:18.2176	18
19	29	(Canada) Devlin DeFrancesco	Andretti Steinbrenner Autosport	Honda	None	None	00:18.2284	19
20	28	(France) Romain Grosjean	Andretti Autosport	Honda	None	None	00:18.2463	20
21	45	(Denmark) Christian Lundgaard	Rahal Letterman Lanigan Racing	Honda	None	None	00:18.2536	21
22	30	(United Kingdom) Jack Harvey	Rahal Letterman Lanigan Racing	Honda	None	None	00:18.3033	22
23	78	(Argentina) Agustín Canapino R	Juncos Hollinger Racing	Chevrolet	None	None	00:18.3319	23
24	77	(United Kingdom) Callum Ilott	Juncos Hollinger Racing	Chevrolet	None	None	00:18.3331	24
25	20	(United States) Ryan Hunter-Reay W	Ed Carpenter Racing	Chevrolet	None	None	00:18.4026	25
26	51	(United States) Sting Ray Robb R	Dale Coyne Racing with Rick Ware Racing	Honda	None	None	00:18.4379	26
27	14	(United States) Santino Ferrucci	A. J. Foyt Enterprises	Chevrolet	None	None	00:18.6701	27
28	55	(Denmark) Benjamin Pedersen R	A. J. Foyt Enterprises	Chevrolet	None	None	No Time	28

=== Warmup ===
Top Practice Speeds
Pos	No.	Driver	Team	Engine	Lap Time
1	12	(Australia) Will Power	Team Penske	Chevrolet	00:18.7675
2	11	(Japan) Takuma Sato	Chip Ganassi Racing	Honda	00:18.8359
3	78	(Argentina) Agustín Canapino R	Juncos Hollinger Racing	Chevrolet	00:19.0318

=== Race ===
The race started at 2:30 PM ET on July 23, 2023.

==== Race classification ====
Pos	No.	Driver	Team	Engine	Laps	Time/Retired	Pit Stops	Grid	Laps Led	Pts.
1	2	(United States) Josef Newgarden W	Team Penske	Chevrolet	250	01:40:25.7356	4	7	212	53
2	12	(Australia) Will Power	Team Penske	Chevrolet	250	+0.7050	4	1	30	42
3	10	(Spain) Álex Palou	Chip Ganassi Racing	Honda	250	+2.6864	5	12		35
4	6	(Sweden) Felix Rosenqvist	Arrow McLaren	Chevrolet	250	+4.1167	4	16	2	33
5	3	(New Zealand) Scott McLaughlin	Team Penske	Chevrolet	250	+7.8891	5	2	2	31
6	9	(New Zealand) Scott Dixon	Chip Ganassi Racing	Honda	249	+1 Lap	5	9	1	29
7	26	(United States) Colton Herta	Andretti Autosport with Curb-Agajanian	Honda	249	+1 Lap	5	5		26
8	18	(United States) David Malukas	Dale Coyne Racing with HMD Motorsports	Honda	249	+1 Lap	5	3		24
9	8	(Sweden) Marcus Ericsson	Chip Ganassi Racing	Honda	249	+1 Lap	5	10	3	23
10	5	(Mexico) Pato O'Ward W	Arrow McLaren	Chevrolet	249	+1 Lap	6	11		20
11	27	(United States) Kyle Kirkwood	Andretti Autosport	Honda	249	+1 Lap	6	17		19
12	28	(France) Romain Grosjean	Andretti Autosport	Honda	249	+1 Lap	6	20		18
13	45	(Denmark) Christian Lundgaard	Rahal Letterman Lanigan Racing	Honda	249	+1 Lap	5	21		17
14	77	(United Kingdom) Callum Ilott	Juncos Hollinger Racing	Chevrolet	248	+2 Laps	5	24		16
15	7	(United States) Alexander Rossi	Arrow McLaren	Chevrolet	248	+2 Laps	5	18		15
16	06	(Brazil) Hélio Castroneves W	Meyer Shank Racing	Honda	248	+2 Laps	5	8		14
17	60	(United States) Conor Daly	Meyer Shank Racing	Honda	248	+2 Laps	5	15		13
18	21	(Netherlands) Rinus VeeKay	Ed Carpenter Racing	Chevrolet	248	+2 Laps	5	14		12
19	30	(United Kingdom) Jack Harvey	Rahal Letterman Lanigan Racing	Honda	247	+3 Laps	5	22		11
20	15	(United States) Graham Rahal	Rahal Letterman Lanigan Racing	Honda	247	+3 Laps	5	6		10
21	29	(Canada) Devlin DeFrancesco	Andretti Steinbrenner Autosport	Honda	246	+4 Laps	5	19		9
22	14	(United States) Santino Ferrucci	A. J. Foyt Enterprises	Chevrolet	245	+5 Laps	6	27		8
23	33	(United States) Ed Carpenter	Ed Carpenter Racing	Chevrolet	244	+6 Laps	5	4		7
24	20	(United States) Ryan Hunter-Reay W	Ed Carpenter Racing	Chevrolet	237	Contact	5	25		6
25	11	(Japan) Takuma Sato	Chip Ganassi Racing	Honda	237	+13 Laps	6	13		5
26	78	(Argentina) Agustín Canapino R	Juncos Hollinger Racing	Chevrolet	236	+14 Laps	8	23		5
DSQ	55	(Denmark) Benjamin Pedersen R	A. J. Foyt Enterprises	Chevrolet	193	Performance (Note: Pedersen was parked on Lap 195 for failure to meet performance standards per Rule 7.9.1)	5	28		5
DSQ	51	(United States) Sting Ray Robb R	Dale Coyne Racing with Rick Ware Racing	Honda	152	Safety (Note: Per rule 7.11.1.2, left pit box with wheel nut not secured on car after tire change. Caused Lap 157 caution when loose wheel exited car, and immediately parked by INDYCAR officials.)	3	26		5
Fastest lap: (Australia) Will Power (Team Penske) – 00:18.9980 (lap 108)

=== Championship standings after the race ===
Drivers' Championship standings

	Pos.	Driver	Points
Unchanged	1	(Spain) Álex Palou	477
Unchanged	2	(United States) Josef Newgarden	397
Unchanged	3	(New Zealand) Scott Dixon	357
1	4	(Sweden) Marcus Ericsson	330
1	5	(New Zealand) Scott McLaughlin	329

Engine manufacturer standings

	Pos.	Manufacturer	Points
Unchanged	1	Honda	978
Unchanged	2	Chevrolet	943

- Note: Only the top five positions are included.

== Footnotes ==
Previous race: 2023 Honda Indy Toronto	IndyCar Series; 2023 season	Next race: 2023 Big Machine Music City Grand Prix
Previous race: 2022 Hy-Vee IndyCar Race Weekend	Hy-Vee IndyCar Race Weekend	Next race: 2024 Hy-Vee IndyCar Race Weekend
