= 2022 Big Machine Music City Grand Prix =

Indycar race held in Speedway, Indiana

(United States) 2022 Big Machine Music City Grand Prix
Race details
14th round of the 2022 IndyCar season
← Previous race	Next race →
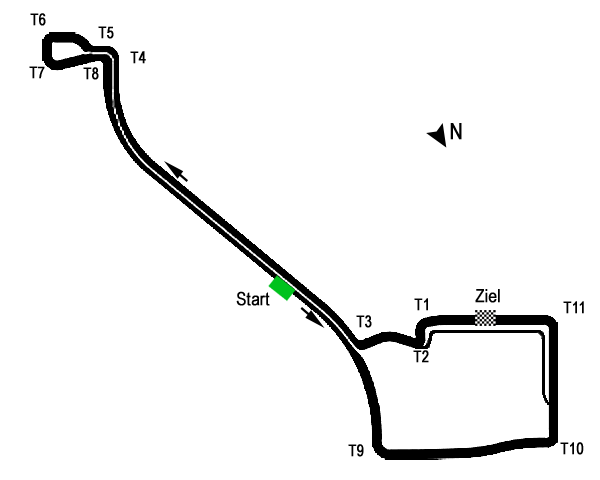
- Date: August 7, 2022
- Official name: Big Machine Music City Grand Prix
- Location: Nashville Street Circuit, Nashville, Tennessee
- Course: Temporary street circuit 2.170 mi / 3.492 km
- Distance: 80 laps 173.600 mi / 279.360 km

Pole position
- Driver: (New Zealand) Scott McLaughlin (Team Penske)
- Time: 01:14.5555

Fastest lap
- Driver: (New Zealand) Scott McLaughlin (Team Penske)
- Time: 01:15.7491 (on lap 48 of 80)

Podium
- First: (New Zealand) Scott Dixon (Chip Ganassi Racing)
- Second: (New Zealand) Scott McLaughlin (Team Penske)
- Third: (Spain) Álex Palou (Chip Ganassi Racing)

The 2022 Big Machine Music City Grand Prix was the fourteenth round of the 2022 IndyCar season. The race was held on August 7, 2022, in Nashville, Tennessee at the Nashville Street Circuit. The race consisted of 80 laps and was won by Scott Dixon of Chip Ganassi Racing.

== Entry list ==
Key	Meaning
R	Rookie
W	Past winner

No.	Driver	Team	Engine
2	(United States) Josef Newgarden	Team Penske	Chevrolet
3	(New Zealand) Scott McLaughlin	Team Penske	Chevrolet
4	(Canada) Dalton Kellett	A. J. Foyt Enterprises	Chevrolet
5	(Mexico) Patricio O'Ward	Arrow McLaren SP	Chevrolet
06	(Brazil) Hélio Castroneves	Meyer Shank Racing	Honda
7	(Sweden) Felix Rosenqvist	Arrow McLaren SP	Chevrolet
8	(Sweden) Marcus Ericsson W	Chip Ganassi Racing	Honda
9	(New Zealand) Scott Dixon	Chip Ganassi Racing	Honda
10	(Spain) Álex Palou	Chip Ganassi Racing	Honda
12	(Australia) Will Power	Team Penske	Chevrolet
14	(United States) Kyle Kirkwood R	A. J. Foyt Enterprises	Chevrolet
15	(United States) Graham Rahal	Rahal Letterman Lanigan Racing	Honda
16	(Switzerland) Simona de Silvestro	Paretta Autosport	Chevrolet
18	(United States) David Malukas R	Dale Coyne Racing with HMD Motorsports	Honda
20	(United States) Conor Daly	Ed Carpenter Racing	Chevrolet
21	(Netherlands) Rinus VeeKay	Ed Carpenter Racing	Chevrolet
26	(United States) Colton Herta	Andretti Autosport	Honda
27	(United States) Alexander Rossi	Andretti Autosport	Honda
28	(France) Romain Grosjean	Andretti Autosport	Honda
29	(Canada) Devlin DeFrancesco R	Andretti Steinbrenner Autosport	Honda
30	(Denmark) Christian Lundgaard R	Rahal Letterman Lanigan Racing	Honda
45	(United Kingdom) Jack Harvey	Rahal Letterman Lanigan Racing	Honda
48	(United States) Jimmie Johnson	Chip Ganassi Racing	Honda
51	(Japan) Takuma Sato	Dale Coyne Racing with Rick Ware Racing	Honda
60	(France) Simon Pagenaud	Meyer Shank Racing	Honda
77	(United Kingdom) Callum Ilott R	Juncos Hollinger Racing	Chevrolet

== Practice ==
=== Practice 1 ===
Top Practice Speeds
Pos	No.	Driver	Team	Engine	Lap Time
1	30	(Denmark) Christian Lundgaard R	Rahal Letterman Lanigan Racing	Honda	01:15.9659
2	7	(Sweden) Felix Rosenqvist	Arrow McLaren SP	Chevrolet	01:16.2050
3	18	(United States) David Malukas R	Dale Coyne Racing with HMD Motorsports	Honda	01:16.2366

=== Practice 2 ===
Top Practice Speeds
Pos	No.	Driver	Team	Engine	Lap Time
1	3	(New Zealand) Scott McLaughlin	Team Penske	Chevrolet	01:15.4609
2	2	(United States) Josef Newgarden	Team Penske	Chevrolet	01:15.7554
3	12	(Australia) Will Power	Team Penske	Chevrolet	01:15.8415

== Qualifying ==
=== Qualifying classification ===
Pos	No.	Driver	Team	Engine	Time				Final grid
Pos	No.	Driver	Team	Engine	Round 1		Round 2	Round 3	Final grid
Pos	No.	Driver	Team	Engine	Group 1	Group 2	Round 2	Round 3	Final grid
1	3	(New Zealand) Scott McLaughlin	Team Penske	Chevrolet	N/A	01:14.7742	01:14.6788	**01:14.5555**	1
2	28	(France) Romain Grosjean	Andretti Autosport	Honda	N/A	01:15.1382	01:14.7679	01:14.6975	2
3	30	(Denmark) Christian Lundgaard **R**	Rahal Letterman Lanigan Racing	Honda	N/A	01:14.8331	01:14.8086	01:14.7149	3
4	10	(Spain) Álex Palou	Chip Ganassi Racing	Honda	**01:15.9983**	N/A	**01:14.6437**	01:14.9087	4
5	5	(Mexico) Pato O'Ward	Arrow McLaren SP	Chevrolet	N/A	01:15.1494	01:14.9373	01:14.9261	5
6	2	(United States) Josef Newgarden	Team Penske	Chevrolet	01:16.7541	N/A	01:14.8284	01:15.1461	6
7	18	(United States) David Malukas **R**	Dale Coyne Racing with HMD Motorsports	Honda	01:16.6882	N/A	01:14.9616	N/A	7
8	12	(Australia) Will Power	Team Penske	Chevrolet	N/A	**01:14.7460**	01:14.9818	N/A	8
9	15	(United States) Graham Rahal	Rahal Letterman Lanigan Racing	Honda	N/A	01:15.2383	01:15.3112	N/A	9
10	21	(Netherlands) Rinus VeeKay	Ed Carpenter Racing	Chevrolet	01:17.7101	N/A	01:15.3897	N/A	10
11	45	(United Kingdom) Jack Harvey	Rahal Letterman Lanigan Racing	Honda	01:16.6324	N/A	01:15.9758	N/A	11
12	4	(Canada) Dalton Kellett	A. J. Foyt Enterprises	Chevrolet	01:17.7521	N/A	01:16.5600	N/A	12
13	60	(France) Simon Pagenaud	Meyer Shank Racing	Honda	01:19.4039	N/A	N/A	N/A	13
14	9	(New Zealand) Scott Dixon	Chip Ganassi Racing	Honda	N/A	01:15.3179	N/A	N/A	14
15	7	(Sweden) Felix Rosenqvist	Arrow McLaren SP	Chevrolet	01:21.1784	N/A	N/A	N/A	15
16	14	(United States) Kyle Kirkwood **R**	A. J. Foyt Enterprises	Chevrolet	N/A	01:15.4382	N/A	N/A	16
17	27	(United States) Alexander Rossi	Andretti Autosport	Honda	01:21.4579	N/A	N/A	N/A	17
18	8	(Sweden) Marcus Ericsson **W**	Chip Ganassi Racing	Honda	N/A	01:15.4501	N/A	N/A	18
19	77	(United Kingdom) Callum Ilott **R**	Juncos Hollinger Racing	Chevrolet	01:57.6982	N/A	N/A	N/A	19
20	51	(Japan) Takuma Sato	Dale Coyne Racing with Rick Ware Racing	Honda	N/A	01:15.5935	N/A	N/A	20
21	16	(Switzerland) Simona de Silvestro	Paretta Autosport	Chevrolet	No Time	N/A	N/A	N/A	21
22	20	(United States) Conor Daly	Ed Carpenter Racing	Chevrolet	N/A	01:16.3955	N/A	N/A	22
23	26	(United States) Colton Herta	Andretti Autosport with Curb-Agajanian	Honda	No Time	N/A	N/A	N/A	23
24	06	(Brazil) Hélio Castroneves	Meyer Shank Racing	Honda	N/A	01:16.5898	N/A	N/A	26 (Note: Hélio Castroneves received a six-place grid penalty due to an unapproved engine change.)
25	29	(Canada) Devlin DeFrancesco **R**	Andretti Steinbrenner Autosport	Honda	No Time	N/A	N/A	N/A	24
26	48	(United States) Jimmie Johnson	Chip Ganassi Racing	Honda	N/A	01:17.5888	N/A	N/A	25

Notes

- **Bold text** indicates fastest time set in session.

== Warmup ==
Top Practice Speeds
Pos	No.	Driver	Team	Engine	Lap Time
1	9	(New Zealand) Scott Dixon	Chip Ganassi Racing	Honda	01:15.6050
2	26	(United States) Colton Herta	Andretti Autosport with Curb-Agajanian	Honda	01:15.6760
3	3	(New Zealand) Scott McLaughlin	Team Penske	Chevrolet	01:16.0134

== Race ==
The race was scheduled to start at 3:30 PM ET on August 7, 2022. However, lightning in the surrounding area caused a lightning hold to be initiated which delayed the start until 5:13 PM ET.

During the race, Marcus Ericsson was forced to give up three spots for getting out of formation and passing prior to the start of the race. On lap 3, Colton Herta bumped the wall while attempting to pass Dalton Kellett on the outside of turn 4. Herta was able to make it back to the pits where his car's nose was replaced. However the time this took put him a lap down. On lap 8, shortly after pitting, the rear wheels of Alexander Rossi's car locked going into turn 10. This stalled the engine and led to the first full course caution of the race. The track crew were able to re-fire Rossi's car, but he went a lap down while waiting to get restarted.

On lap 22, Helio Castroneves spun coming out of turn 3 but did not hit the wall. This brought out the second full course caution. Many teams opted to pit during this caution period. Álex Palou had pitted just prior to the caution period and therefore did not pit again. Pole sitter Scott McLaughlin had led the race to this point, but when he and many other drivers pitted, it gave the lead to Palou. On lap 26, shortly after the restart, there was a pileup as cars slowed heading through turns 6 and 7. This led to Graham Rahal hitting the back of Pato O'Ward who in turn tapped Will Power. The contact apparently broke O'Ward's gearbox and he was unable to continue. Rahal limped back to the pits, brushing the wall on his way. Further behind them, Callum Ilott stalled while Dalton Kellett and Simona De Silvestro received damage, ending their races. Scott Dixon was hit from behind but was able to continue.

After the restart, there were two separate incidents on lap 33. Alexander Rossi and Callum Ilott ended up in the turn 9 runoff area but were able to continue. Just beyond this in turn 10, Devlin DeFrancesco and Takuma Sato ended up in the wall, ending their race. These incidents brought out yet another full course caution, the forth of the race. On lap 52, Graham Rahal hit the wall in turn 4. Rinus VeeKay was unable to avoid Rahal and ran into the back of his car. Will Power and Jimmie Johnson—who were immediately behind—narrowly managed to miss the wreckage. VeeKay was able to limp back to the pits with front wing damage. Álex Palou had continued to lead the race until this point but pitted during the ensuing caution period. This gave the lead to Josef Newgarden on the restart. He was followed by Scott Dixon who had pitted twelve laps more recently than Newgarden.

On lap 64, Kyle Kirkwood attempted a late pass of David Malukas on the inside of turn 9. When Malukas turned into the corner, he sandwiched Kirkwood between himself and the inside wall. This resulted in both cars sliding into the outside wall, ending their races. During the caution, Newgarden pitted which gave the lead to Scott Dixon. The race resumed with 11 laps to go. Four laps later with just 7 laps to go, Jimmy Johnson spun toward the end of the straight heading toward turn 4 and hit the wall. This brought out the seventh full course caution. On the restart two laps later, Josef Newgarden attempted to pass several cars on the inside of turn 9 (the first corner after the restart line). He pushed Romain Grosjean into the outside wall, ending his race. IndyCar officials decided to red flag the race out of a desire to end the race under green. The race resumed with two laps to go with Scott Dixon still leading, a lead which he held on to until the end of the race. This win was Dixon's 53rd, placing him second in all time American open-wheeled race wins, winning more than any driver besides A.J. Foyt.

=== Race classification ===
Pos	No.	Driver	Team	Engine	Laps	Time/Retired	Pit Stops	Grid	Laps Led	Pts.
1	9	(New Zealand) Scott Dixon	Chip Ganassi Racing	Honda	80	02:06:24.2439	7	14	15	51
2	3	(New Zealand) Scott McLaughlin	Team Penske	Chevrolet	80	+0.1067	3	1	22	42
3	10	(Spain) Álex Palou	Chip Ganassi Racing	Honda	80	+0.6100	3	4	31	38
4	27	(United States) Alexander Rossi	Andretti Autosport	Honda	80	+0.9412	5	17		32
5	26	(United States) Colton Herta	Andretti Autosport with Curb-Agajanian	Honda	80	+1.3942	4	23		30
6	2	(United States) Josef Newgarden	Team Penske	Chevrolet	80	+2.1828	4	6	12	29
7	7	(Sweden) Felix Rosenqvist	Arrow McLaren SP	Chevrolet	80	+2.8426	4	15		26
8	30	(Denmark) Christian Lundgaard R	Rahal Letterman Lanigan Racing	Honda	80	+3.2724	3	3		24
9	60	(France) Simon Pagenaud	Meyer Shank Racing	Honda	80	+4.4000	3	13		22
10	45	(United Kingdom) Jack Harvey	Rahal Letterman Lanigan Racing	Honda	80	+5.1560	5	11		20
11	12	(Australia) Will Power	Team Penske	Chevrolet	80	+6.7843	3	8		19
12	21	(Netherlands) Rinus VeeKay	Ed Carpenter Racing	Chevrolet	79	+1 Lap	5	10		18
13	06	(Brazil) Hélio Castroneves	Meyer Shank Racing	Honda	79	+1 Lap	9	26		17
14	8	(Sweden) Marcus Ericsson W	Chip Ganassi Racing	Honda	76	Gearbox	3	18		16
15	77	(United Kingdom) Callum Ilott R	Juncos Hollinger Racing	Chevrolet	76	+4 Laps	8	19		15
16	28	(France) Romain Grosjean	Andretti Autosport	Honda	75	Contact	2	2		14
17	20	(United States) Conor Daly	Ed Carpenter Racing	Chevrolet	74	+6 Laps	4	22		13
18	48	(United States) Jimmie Johnson	Chip Ganassi Racing	Honda	72	Contact	3	25		12
19	14	(United States) Kyle Kirkwood R	A. J. Foyt Enterprises	Chevrolet	63	Contact	2	16		11
20	18	(United States) David Malukas R	Dale Coyne Racing with HMD Motorsports	Honda	63	Contact	2	7		10
21	51	(Japan) Takuma Sato	Dale Coyne Racing with Rick Ware Racing	Honda	32	Contact	1	20		9
22	29	(Canada) Devlin DeFrancesco R	Andretti Steinbrenner Autosport	Honda	32	Contact	2	24		8
23	15	(United States) Graham Rahal	Rahal Letterman Lanigan Racing	Honda	29	Contact	2	9		7
24	5	(Mexico) Pato O'Ward	Arrow McLaren SP	Chevrolet	25	Contact	1	5		6
25	4	(Canada) Dalton Kellett	A. J. Foyt Enterprises	Chevrolet	25	Contact	1	12		5
26	16	(Switzerland) Simona de Silvestro	Paretta Autosport	Chevrolet	25	Contact	1	21		5
Fastest lap: (New Zealand) Scott McLaughlin (Team Penske) – 01:15.7491 (lap 48)

== Championship standings after the race ==
Drivers' Championship standings

	Pos.	Driver	Points
Unchanged	1	(Australia) Will Power	450
2	2	(New Zealand) Scott Dixon	444
1	3	(Sweden) Marcus Ericsson	438
1	4	(United States) Josef Newgarden	428
1	5	(Spain) Álex Palou	417

Engine manufacturer standings

	Pos.	Manufacturer	Points
Unchanged	1	Chevrolet	1157
Unchanged	2	Honda	1089

- Note: Only the top five positions are included.

== Footnotes ==
Previous race: 2022 Gallagher Grand Prix	IndyCar Series; 2022 season	Next race: 2022 Bommarito Automotive Group 500
Previous race: 2021 Big Machine Music City Grand Prix	Big Machine Music City Grand Prix	Next race: 2023 Big Machine Music City Grand Prix
