= 2024 XPEL Grand Prix at Road America =

Indycar race held in Elkhart Lake, Wisconsin

(United States) 2024 XPEL Grand Prix at Road America
Race details
7th round of the 2024 IndyCar season
← Previous race	Next race →
- Layout of the Road America circuit
- Date: June 9, 2024
- Official name: Grand Prix at Road America
- Location: Road America, Elkhart Lake, Wisconsin
- Course: Permanent road course 4.014 mi / 6.460 km
- Distance: 55 laps 220.55 mi / 354.94 km

Pole position
- Driver: (Sweden) Linus Lundqvist (Chip Ganassi Racing)
- Time: 01:45.1519

Fastest lap
- Driver: (New Zealand) Scott Dixon (Chip Ganassi Racing)
- Time: 01:43.107 (on lap 52 of 55)

Podium
- First: (Australia) Will Power (Team Penske)
- Second: (United States) Josef Newgarden (Team Penske)
- Third: (New Zealand) Scott McLaughlin (Team Penske)

Chronology
Previous	Next
2023	2025

The 2024 XPEL Grand Prix at Road America presented by AMR was the seventh round of the 2024 IndyCar season. The race was held on June 9, 2024, in Elkhart Lake, Wisconsin at Road America. The race consisted of 55 laps and was won by Will Power.

== Practice ==
=== Practice 1 ===
Key	Meaning
R	Rookie
W	Past winner

Top Practice Speeds
Pos	No.	Driver	Team	Engine	Lap Time
1	10	(Spain) Álex Palou W	Chip Ganassi Racing	Honda	01:43.1709
2	26	(United States) Colton Herta	Andretti Global with Curb-Agajanian	Chevrolet	01:43.2506
3	14	(United States) Santino Ferrucci	A.J. Foyt Racing	Chevrolet	01:43.3618

=== Practice 2 ===
Top Practice Speeds
Pos	No.	Driver	Team	Engine	Lap Time
1	26	(United States) Colton Herta	Andretti Autosport with Curb-Agajanian	Honda	02:07.3027
2	12	(Australia) Will Power W	Team Penske	Chevrolet	02:09.2497
3	20	(Denmark) Christian Rasmussen R	Ed Carpenter Racing	Chevrolet	02:09.5138

== Qualifying ==
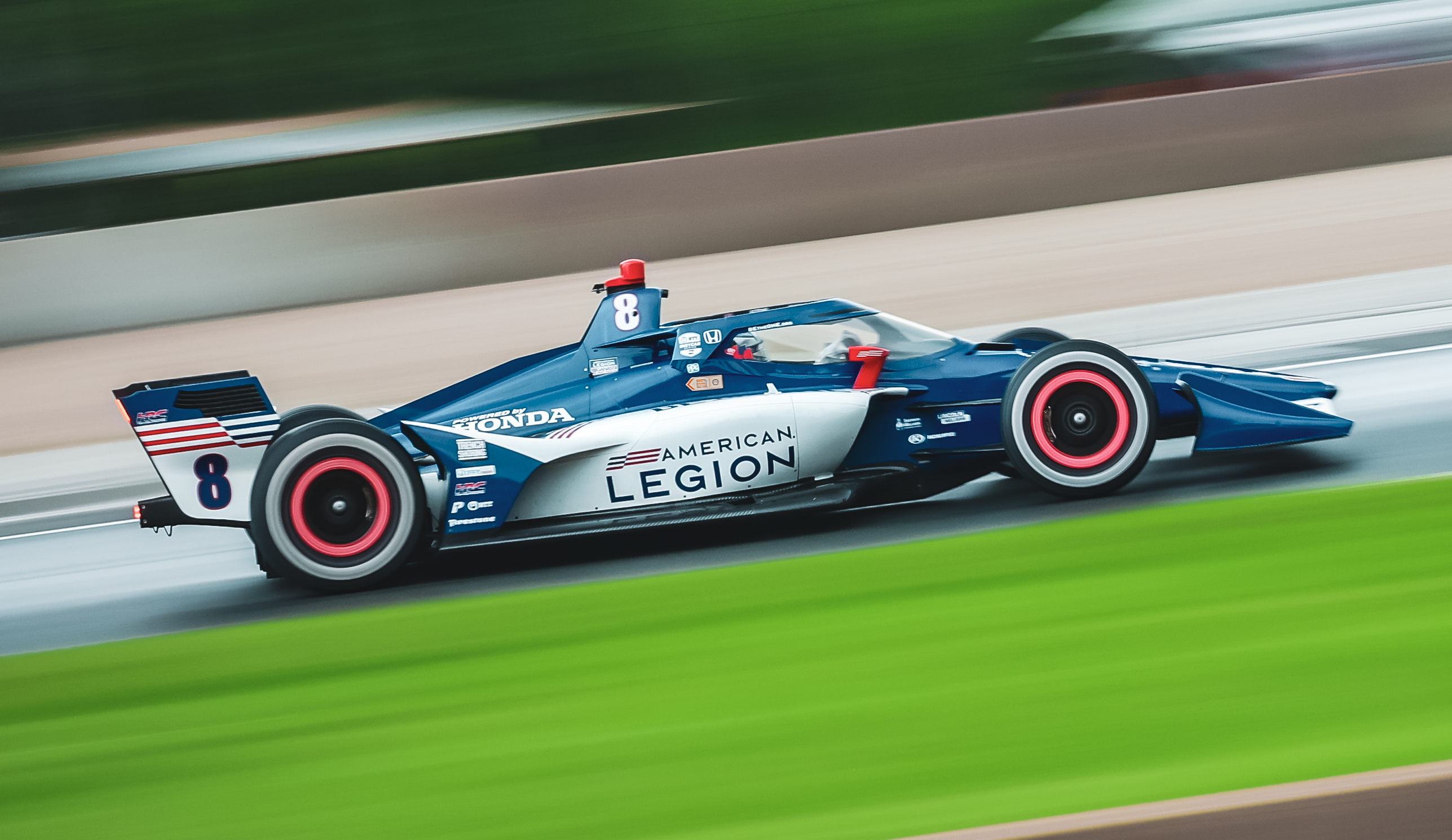
Linus Lundqvist takes the pole position.

=== Qualifying classification ===
Pos	No.	Driver	Team	Engine	Time				Final grid
Pos	No.	Driver	Team	Engine	Round 1		Round 2	Round 3	Final grid
Pos	No.	Driver	Team	Engine	Group 1	Group 2	Round 2	Round 3	Final grid
1	8	(Sweden) Linus Lundqvist **R**	Chip Ganassi Racing	Honda	N/A	02:01.4129	01:59.9421	01:45.1519	1
2	26	(United States) Colton Herta	Andretti Autosport with Curb-Agajanian	Honda	N/A	02:00.3275	01:59.2088	01:45.2913	1
3	11	(New Zealand) Marcus Armstrong	Chip Ganassi Racing	Honda	02:01.3910	N/A	01:59.5949	01:45.6592	2

Notes

- **Bold text** indicates fastest time set in session.

== Warmup ==
Top Practice Speeds
Pos	No.	Driver	Team	Engine	Lap Time
1	2	(United States) Josef Newgarden **W**	Team Penske	Chevrolet	01:43.1311
2	3	(New Zealand) Scott McLaughlin	Team Penske	Chevrolet	01:43.4258
3	9	(New Zealand) Scott Dixon **W**	Chip Ganassi Racing	Honda	01:43.7895

== Race results ==
The race started at 3:30 PM ET on June 9, 2024.

=== Race classification ===
Pos	No.	Driver	Team	Engine	Laps	Time/Retired	Pit Stops	Grid	Laps Led	Pts.
1	12	(Australia) Will Power **W**	Team Penske	Chevrolet	55	1:45:00.0267	3	5	9	51
2	2	(United States) Josef Newgarden **W**	Team Penske	Chevrolet	55	+3.2609	3	6	10	41
3	3	(New Zealand) Scott McLaughlin	Team Penske	Chevrolet	55	+8.0148	3	8	18	38
4	10	(Spain) Álex Palou **W**	Chip Ganassi Racing	Honda	55	+16.7118	3	7	3	33
5	27	(United States) Kyle Kirkwood	Andretti Global	Honda	55	+24.8662	3	4	3	31
6	26	(United States) Colton Herta	Andretti Global with Curb-Agajanian	Honda	55	+28.3782	5	2	9	29
7	77	(France) Romain Grosjean	Juncos Hollinger Racing	Chevrolet	55	+29.2710	3	14		26
8	5	(Mexico) Pato O'Ward	Arrow McLaren	Chevrolet	55	+30.3109	4	11		24
9	28	(Sweden) Marcus Ericsson	Andretti Global	Honda	55	+35.6260	3	15		22
10	15	(United States) Graham Rahal	Rahal Letterman Lanigan Racing	Honda	55	+42.8394	4	24		20
11	45	(Denmark) Christian Lundgaard	Rahal Letterman Lanigan Racing	Honda	55	+46.4444	3	13		19
12	8	(Sweden) Linus Lundqvist **R**	Chip Ganassi Racing	Honda	55	+46.8107	5	1		19
13	6	(France) Théo Pourchaire **R**	Arrow McLaren	Chevrolet	55	+54.5282	3	18		17
14	60	(Sweden) Felix Rosenqvist **W**	Meyer Shank Racing	Honda	55	+59.2412	3	22	3	17
15	14	(United States) Santino Ferrucci	A.J. Foyt Enterprises	Chevrolet	55	+1:03.733	3	19		15
16	30	(Brazil) Pietro Fittipaldi	Rahal Letterman Lanigan Racing	Honda	55	+1:04.716	3	25		14
17	41	(United States) Sting Ray Robb	A.J. Foyt Enterprises	Chevrolet	55	+1:08.438	3	26		13
18	7	(United States) Alexander Rossi **W**	Arrow McLaren	Chevrolet	55	+1:15.042	3	9		12
19	66	(Brazil) Hélio Castroneves	Meyer Shank Racing	Honda	55	+1:15.691	3	27		11
20	20	(Denmark) Christian Rasmussen **R**	Ed Carpenter Racing	Chevrolet	55	+1:19.070	3	16		10
21	9	(New Zealand) Scott Dixon **W**	Chip Ganassi Racing	Honda	55	+1:24.475	3	10		9
22	51	(Italy) Luca Ghiotto **R**	Dale Coyne Racing with Rick Ware Racing	Honda	55	+1:40.161	5	23		8
23	78	(United States) Nolan Siegel **R**	Juncos Hollinger Racing	Chevrolet	54	+1 Lap	3	21		7
24	21	(Netherlands) Rinus VeeKay	Ed Carpenter Racing	Chevrolet	53	+2 Laps	3	17		6
25	18	(United Kingdom) Jack Harvey	Dale Coyne Racing	Honda	51	+4 Laps	3	20		5
26	11	(New Zealand) Marcus Armstrong	Chip Ganassi Racing	Honda	35	Mechanical	3	3		5
27	4	(Cayman Islands) Kyffin Simpson **R**	Chip Ganassi Racing	Honda	5	Contact	0	12		5
Fastest lap: (New Zealand) Scott Dixon (Chip Ganassi Racing) – 01:43.107 (lap 55)
