= 2024 Firestone Grand Prix of Monterey =

Indycar race held in Monterey, California

(United States) 2024 Firestone Grand Prix of Monterey
Race details
8th round of the 2024 IndyCar season
← Previous race	Next race →
- Layout of the WeatherTech Raceway Laguna Seca
- Date: June 23, 2024
- Official name: Firestone Grand Prix of Monterey
- Location: WeatherTech Raceway Laguna Seca, Monterey, California
- Course: Permanent racing facility 2.238 mi / 3.602 km
- Distance: 95 laps 212.61 mi / 342.163 km

Pole position
- Driver: (Spain) Álex Palou (Chip Ganassi Racing)
- Time: 01:07.1465

Fastest lap
- Driver: (Sweden) Marcus Ericsson (Andretti Global)
- Time: 01:08.9728 (on lap 20 of 95)

Podium
- First: (Spain) Álex Palou (Chip Ganassi Racing)
- Second: (United States) Colton Herta (Andretti Autosport with Curb-Agajanian)
- Third: (United States) Alexander Rossi (Arrow McLaren)

Chronology
Previous	Next
2023	2025

The 2024 Firestone Grand Prix of Monterey was the eighth round of the 2024 IndyCar season. The race was held on June 23, 2024, in Monterey, California at the WeatherTech Raceway Laguna Seca. The race contested of 95 laps and was won by Álex Palou.

== Practice ==
=== Practice 1 ===
Top Practice Speeds
Pos	No.	Driver	Team	Engine	Lap Time
1	3	(New Zealand) Scott McLaughlin	Team Penske	Chevrolet	01:07.6325
2	26	(United States) Colton Herta W	Andretti Autosport with Curb-Agajanian	Honda	01:07.7316
3	10	(Spain) Álex Palou W	Chip Ganassi Racing	Honda	01:07.7371

=== Practice 2 ===
Top Practice Speeds
Pos	No.	Driver	Team	Engine	Lap Time
1	26	(United States) Colton Herta W	Andretti Autosport with Curb-Agajanian	Honda	01:08.2300
2	12	(Australia) Will Power	Team Penske	Chevrolet	01:08.4261
3	10	(Spain) Álex Palou W	Chip Ganassi Racing	Honda	01:08.4387

== Qualifying ==
=== Qualifying classification ===
Pos	No.	Driver	Team	Engine	Time				Final grid
Pos	No.	Driver	Team	Engine	Round 1		Round 2	Round 3	Final grid
Pos	No.	Driver	Team	Engine	Group 1	Group 2	Round 2	Round 3	Final grid
1	10	(Spain) Álex Palou **W**	Chip Ganassi Racing	Honda	N/A	01:07.2651	01:07.2572	01:07.1465	1
2	27	(United States) Kyle Kirkwood	Andretti Autosport with Curb-Agajanian	Honda	N/A	01:07.3232	01:07.2841	01:07.2204	1
3	60	(Sweden) Felix Rosenqvist	Meyer Shank Racing	Honda	N/A	01:07.4216	01:07.3157	01:07.2917	2

Notes

- **Bold text** indicates fastest time set in session.

== Warmup ==
Top Practice Speeds
Pos	No.	Driver	Team	Engine	Lap Time
1	21	(Netherlands) Rinus VeeKay	Ed Carpenter Racing	Chevrolet	01:08.4096
2	9	(New Zealand) Scott Dixon **W**	Chip Ganassi Racing	Honda	01:08.4516
3	78	(Argentina) Agustín Canapino	Juncos Hollinger Racing	Honda	01:08.5314

== Race ==
The race started at 3:30 PM PT on June 23, 2024.

=== Race classification ===
Pos	No.	Driver	Team	Engine	Laps	Total Time	Pit Stops	Grid	Laps Led	Pts.
1	10	(Spain) Álex Palou **W**	Chip Ganassi Racing	Honda	95	02:04:09.8545	3	1	48	54
2	26	(United States) Colton Herta **W**	Andretti Autosport with Curb-Agajanian	Honda	95	02:04:11.8325	3	4	8	41
3	7	(United States) Alexander Rossi	Arrow McLaren	Chevrolet	95	02:04:14.3681	3	5	10	36
4	77	(France) Romain Grosjean	Juncos Hollinger Racing	Chevrolet	95	02:04:14.6788	3	8	-	32
5	27	(United States) Kyle Kirkwood	Andretti Global	Honda	95	02:04:18.5313	3	2	24	31
6	9	(New Zealand) Scott Dixon	Chip Ganassi Racing	Honda	95	02:04:19.0049	3	10	-	28
7	12	(Australia) Will Power	Team Penske	Chevrolet	95	02:04:19.8509	3	15	-	26
8	5	(Mexico) Pato O'Ward	Arrow McLaren	Chevrolet	95	02:04:20.4759	3	9	-	24
9	14	(United States) Santino Ferrucci	A.J. Foyt Enterprises	Chevrolet	95	02:04:20.8570	3	17	-	22
10	28	(Sweden) Marcus Ericsson	Andretti Global	Honda	95	02:04:21.4943	3	18	-	20
11	60	(Sweden) Felix Rosenqvist	Meyer Shank Racing	Honda	95	02:04:22.5633	3	3	-	19
12	6	(United States) Nolan Siegel **R**	Arrow McLaren	Chevrolet	95	02:04:22.9850	3	23	-	18
13	20	(Denmark) Christian Rasmussen **R**	Ed Carpenter Racing	Chevrolet	95	02:04:24.2315	3	21	-	17
14	30	(Brazil) Pietro Fittipaldi	Rahal Letterman Lanigan Racing	Honda	95	02:04:24.6086	4	24	-	16
15	45	(Denmark) Christian Lundgaard	Rahal Letterman Lanigan Racing	Honda	95	02:04:24.9289	3	6	-	15
16	66	(United States) David Malukas	Meyer Shank Racing	Honda	95	02:04:28.3554	4	12	-	14
17	8	(Sweden) Linus Lundqvist **R**	Chip Ganassi Racing	Honda	95	02:04:30.0268	4	16	-	13
18	78	(Argentina) Agustín Canapino	Juncos Hollinger Racing	Chevrolet	95	02:04:33.3992	3	13	-	12
19	2	(United States) Josef Newgarden	Team Penske	Chevrolet	95	02:04:37.1113	3	14	5	12
20	41	(United States) Sting Ray Robb	A.J. Foyt Enterprises	Chevrolet	94	02:04:18.5313	3	25	-	10
21	3	(New Zealand) Scott McLaughlin	Team Penske	Chevrolet	93	02:04:31.9741	5	7	-	9
22	11	(New Zealand) Marcus Armstrong	Chip Ganassi Racing	Honda	93	02:04:48.4558	3	11	-	8
23	4	(Cayman Islands) Kyffin Simpson **R**	Chip Ganassi Racing	Honda	86	Contact	3	22	-	7
24	15	(United States) Graham Rahal	Rahal Letterman Lanigan Racing	Honda	86	Contact	4	19	-	6
25	18	(United Kingdom) Jack Harvey	Dale Coyne Racing	Honda	82	Mechanical	3	26	-	5
26	21	(Netherlands) Rinus VeeKay	Ed Carpenter Racing	Chevrolet	72	02:04:18.5313	3	20	-	5
27	51	(Italy) Luca Ghiotto **R**	Dale Coyne Racing with Rick Ware Racing	Honda	34	Contact	1	27	-	5
Fastest lap: (Sweden) Marcus Ericsson (Andretti Global) – 01:08.9728 (lap 20)
