= 2024 Hy-Vee Milwaukee Mile 250s =

Indycar race held in West Allis, Wisconsin

(United States) 2024 Hy-Vee Milwaukee Mile 250s
Race details
15th and 16th round of the 2024 IndyCar season
← Previous race	Next race →
- Layout of the Milwaukee Mile circuit
- Date: August 31 - September 1, 2024
- Official name: 2024 Hy-Vee Milwaukee Mile 250
- Location: Milwaukee Mile
- Course: Permanent racing facility 1 mi / 1.6 km
- Distance: Both 250 laps 253.750 mi / 408.371 km
Race 1

Pole position
- Driver: (New Zealand) Scott McLaughlin (Team Penske)
- Time: 00:22.5082

Fastest lap
- Driver: (New Zealand) Scott McLaughlin (Team Penske)
- Time: 00.23.5855 (on lap 3 of 250)

Podium
- First: (Mexico) Pato O'Ward (Arrow McLaren)
- Second: (Australia) Will Power (Team Penske)
- Third: (United States) Conor Daly (Juncos Hollinger Racing)
Race 2

Pole position
- Driver: (United States) Josef Newgarden (Team Penske)
- Time: 00:22.6980

Fastest lap
- Driver: (New Zealand) Scott Dixon (Chip Ganassi Racing)
- Time: 00.23.5149 (on lap 242 of 250)

Podium
- First: (New Zealand) Scott McLaughlin (Team Penske)
- Second: (New Zealand) Scott Dixon (Chip Ganassi Racing)
- Third: (United States) Colton Herta (Andretti Global with Curb-Agajanian)

Chronology
Previous	Next
2015	2025

The 2024 Hy-Vee Milwaukee Mile 250s were a pair of IndyCar Series auto races held on August 31, 2024, and September 1, 2024, at The Milwaukee Mile in West Allis, Wisconsin. They were the 15th and 16th rounds of the 2024 IndyCar season. The race weekend has been held since 2004, except for a brief hiatus in 2016, when the race returned back in the schedule in 2024.

The first race (officially the Hy-Vee Milwaukee Mile 250 – Race 1) was held on August 31, 2024, with the second (officially the Hy-Vee Milwaukee Mile 250 – Race 2) held on September 1, 2024. Each race was 250 laps. The first race was won by Pato O'Ward and the second race was won by Scott McLaughlin.

== Race 1 - Hy-Vee Milwaukee Mile 250 Race – 1 ==
=== Practice ===
Top Practice Speeds
Pos	No.	Driver	Team	Engine	Lap Time
1	2	(United States) Josef Newgarden	Team Penske	Chevrolet	00:23.0156
2	9	(New Zealand) Scott Dixon W	Chip Ganassi Racing	Honda	00:23.1149
3	5	(Mexico) Pato O'Ward	Arrow McLaren	Chevrolet	00:23.1653

=== Qualifying classification ===
Pos	No.	Driver	Team	Engine	Time	Final grid							
Pos	No.	Driver	Team	Engine	Time	Final grid	1	3	(New Zealand) Scott McLaughlin	Team Penske	Chevrolet	22.5082	1
Pos	No.	Driver	Team	Engine	Time	Final grid	2	2	(United States) Josef Newgarden	Team Penske	Chevrolet	22.6058	11
3	66	(United States) David Malukas	Meyer Shank Racing	Honda	22.6358	2							
4	7	(United States) Alexander Rossi	Arrow McLaren	Chevrolet	22.7619	3							
5	8	(Sweden) Linus Lundqvist R	Chip Ganassi Racing	Honda	22.7721	4							
6	12	(Australia) Will Power W	Team Penske	Chevrolet	22.8169	5							
7	11	(New Zealand) Marcus Armstrong	Chip Ganassi Racing	Honda	22.8316	16							
8	5	(Mexico) Pato O'Ward	Arrow McLaren	Chevrolet	22.8720	6							
9	28	(Sweden) Marcus Ericsson	Andretti Global	Honda	22.9697	7							
10	60	(Sweden) Felix Rosenqvist	Meyer Shank Racing	Honda	22.9817	8							
11	77	(France) Romain Grosjean	Juncos Hollinger Racing	Chevrolet	22.9922	9							
12	26	(United States) Colton Herta	Andretti Global	Honda	23.0429	10							
13	10	(Spain) Alex Palou	Chip Ganassi Racing	Honda	23.0586	12							
14	21	(Netherlands) Rinus VeeKay	Ed Carpenter Racing	Chevrolet	23.1438	13							
15	18	(United Kingdom) Jack Harvey	Dale Coyne Racing	Honda	23.1478	14							
16	20	(Denmark) Christian Rasmussen R	Ed Carpenter Racing	Chevrolet	23.2871	23							
17	6	(United States) Nolan Siegel R	Arrow McLaren	Chevrolet	23.3218	24							
18	78	(United States) Conor Daly	Juncos Hollinger Racing	Chevrolet	23.3441	25							
19	27	(United States) Kyle Kirkwood	Andretti Global	Honda	23.3665	15							
20	9	(New Zealand) Scott Dixon W	Chip Ganassi Racing	Honda	23.3910	17							
21	51	(United Kingdom) Katherine Legge	Dale Coyne Racing	Honda	23.4468	18							
22	14	(United States) Santino Ferrucci	A. J. Foyt Enterprises	Chevrolet	23.4738	19							
23	41	(United States) Sting Ray Robb	A. J. Foyt Enterprises	Chevrolet	23.4739	20							
24	15	(United States) Graham Rahal	Rahal Letterman Lanigan Racing	Honda	23.5530	21							
25	4	(Cayman Islands) Kyffin Simpson R	Chip Ganassi Racing	Honda	23.5646	22							
26	45	(Denmark) Christian Lundgaard	Rahal Letterman Lanigan Racing	Honda	23.7751	26							
27	30	(Brazil) Pietro Fittipaldi	Rahal Letterman Lanigan Racing	Honda	24.1751	27							
Official Report

=== Race ===
==== Race classification ====
Pos	No.	Driver	Team	Engine	Laps	Time Took	Pit Stops	Grid	Laps Led	Pts.
1	5	(Mexico) Pato O'Ward	Arrow McLaren	Chevrolet	250	02:03:01.3451	4	6	133	53
2	12	(Australia) Will Power W	Team Penske	Chevrolet	250	02:03:03.1666	4	5	9	41
3	78	(United States) Conor Daly	Juncos Hollinger Racing	Chevrolet	250	02:03:03.7490	4	25	-	35
4	14	(United States) Santino Ferrucci	A. J. Foyt Enterprises	Chevrolet	250	02:03:18.0349	4	19	-	32
5	10	(Spain) Alex Palou	Chip Ganassi Racing	Honda	250	02:03:20.0530	4	12	-	30
6	8	(Sweden) Linus Lundqvist R	Chip Ganassi Racing	Honda	250	02:02:20.5881	4	4	19	29
7	7	(United States) Alexander Rossi	Arrow McLaren	Chevrolet	250	02:03:21.6948	4	3	-	26
8	3	(New Zealand) Scott McLaughlin	Team Penske	Chevrolet	250	02:03:22.4187	3	1	80	26
9	45	(Denmark) Christian Lundgaard	Rahal Letterman Lanigan Racing	Honda	250	02:03:22.9163	5	26	-	22
10	9	(New Zealand) Scott Dixon W	Chip Ganassi Racing	Honda	250	02:03:23.2204	4	17	-	20
11	20	(Denmark) Christian Rasmussen R	Ed Carpenter Racing	Chevrolet	250	02:03:24.2568	4	23	-	19
12	27	(United States) Kyle Kirkwood	Andretti Global	Honda	250	02:03:24.4760	4	15	-	18
13	60	(Sweden) Felix Rosenqvist	Meyer Shank Racing	Honda	250	02:03:27.5759	4	8	-	17
14	21	(Netherlands) Rinus VeeKay	Ed Carpenter Racing	Chevrolet	249	02:03:14.6290	4	13	-	16
15	66	(United States) David Malukas	Meyer Shank Racing	Honda	249	02:03:21.1244	4	2	-	15
16	18	(United Kingdom) Jack Harvey	Dale Coyne Racing	Honda	249	02:03:27.2078	4	14	-	14
17	6	(United States) Nolan Siegel R	Arrow McLaren	Chevrolet	249	02:03:27.9442	4	24	-	13
18	30	(Brazil) Pietro Fittipaldi	Rahal Letterman Lanigan Racing	Honda	248	02:03:15.1790	4	27	-	12
19	51	(United Kingdom) Katherine Legge	Dale Coyne Racing	Honda	248	02:03:19.5467	5	18	-	11
20	15	(United States) Graham Rahal	Rahal Letterman Lanigan Racing	Honda	248	02:03:29.2672	5	21	-	10
21	11	(New Zealand) Marcus Armstrong	Chip Ganassi Racing	Honda	247	02:03:02.6933	4	16	-	9
22	26	(United States) Colton Herta	Andretti Global	Honda	246	02:03:15.9124	5	10	9	9
23	41	(United States) Sting Ray Robb	A. J. Foyt Enterprises	Chevrolet	244	02:03:16.2906	3	20	-	7
24	77	(France) Romain Grosjean	Juncos Hollinger Racing	Chevrolet	243	02:03:04.3680	5	9	-	6
25	4	(Cayman Islands) Kyffin Simpson R	Chip Ganassi Racing	Honda	238	02:03:19.0057	4	22	-	5
26	2	(United States) Josef Newgarden	Team Penske	Chevrolet	146	Contact	3	11	-	5
27	28	(Sweden) Marcus Ericsson	Andretti Global	Honda	146	Contact	3	7	-	5
Official Report

== Race 2 - Hy-Vee Milwaukee Mile 250 Race – 2 ==
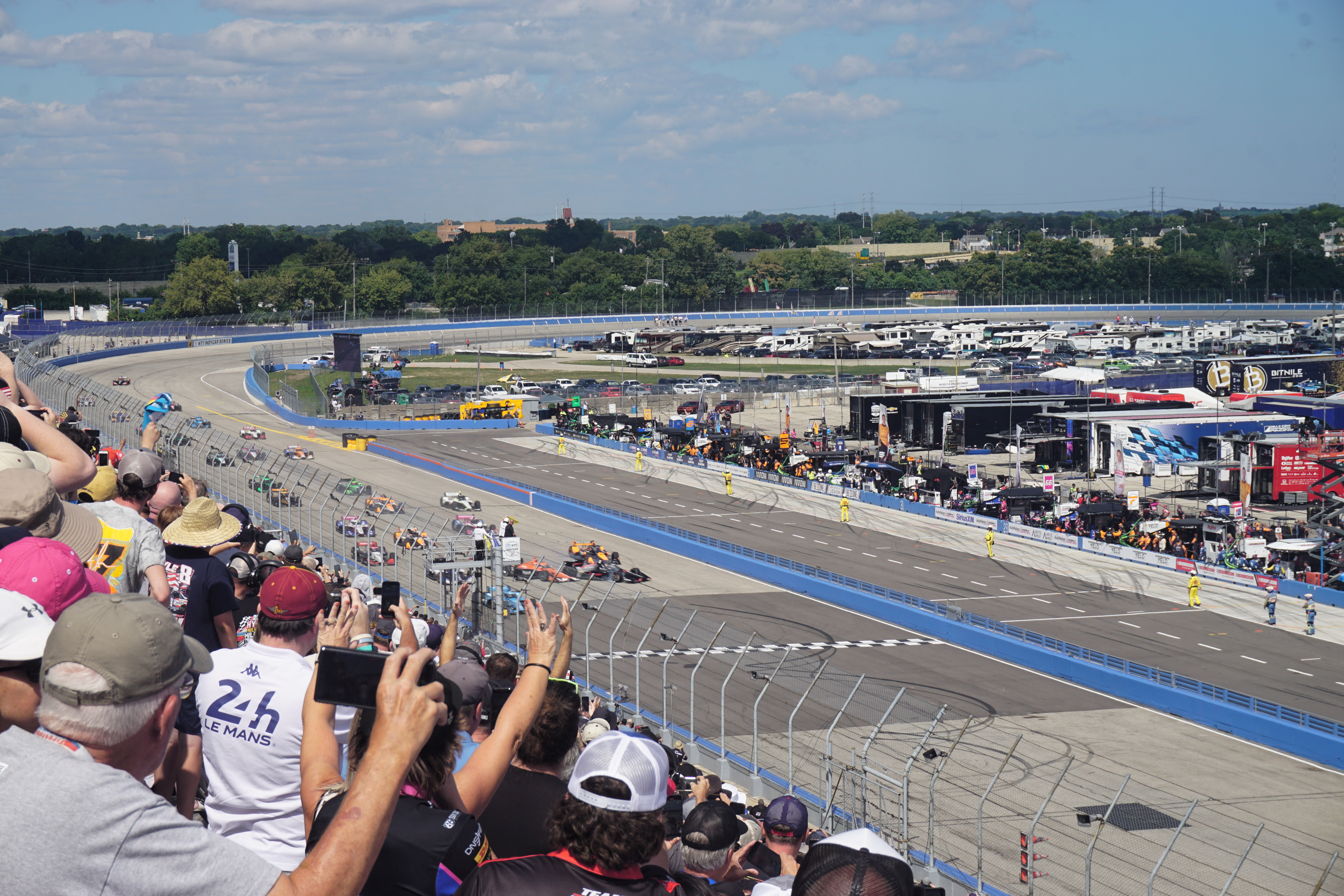
Abandoned start of the second race

=== Qualifying classification ===
Pos	No.	Driver	Team	Engine	Time	Final grid							
Pos	No.	Driver	Team	Engine	Time	Final grid	1	2	(United States) Josef Newgarden	Team Penske	Chevrolet	22.6980	1
Pos	No.	Driver	Team	Engine	Time	Final grid	2	3	(New Zealand) Scott McLaughlin	Team Penske	Chevrolet	22.7080	2
3	11	(New Zealand) Marcus Armstrong	Chip Ganassi Racing	Honda	22.8085	3							
4	12	(Australia) Will Power W	Team Penske	Chevrolet	22.8462	4							
5	8	(Sweden) Linus Lundqvist R	Chip Ganassi Racing	Honda	22.8538	5							
6	7	(United States) Alexander Rossi	Arrow McLaren	Chevrolet	22.9780	6							
7	5	(Mexico) Pato O'Ward	Arrow McLaren	Chevrolet	23.0536	7							
8	60	(Sweden) Felix Rosenqvist	Meyer Shank Racing	Honda	23.0537	8							
9	66	(United States) David Malukas	Meyer Shank Racing	Honda	23.0602	9							
10	10	(Spain) Alex Palou	Chip Ganassi Racing	Honda	23.1164	10							
11	6	(United States) Nolan Siegel R	Arrow McLaren	Chevrolet	23.1223	11							
12	14	(United States) Santino Ferrucci	A. J. Foyt Enterprises	Chevrolet	23.1697	12							
13	18	(United Kingdom) Jack Harvey	Dale Coyne Racing	Honda	23.1742	13							
14	77	(France) Romain Grosjean	Juncos Hollinger Racing	Chevrolet	23.2114	14							
15	21	(Netherlands) Rinus VeeKay	Ed Carpenter Racing	Chevrolet	23.2750	15							
16	28	(Sweden) Marcus Ericsson	Andretti Global	Honda	23.2862	16							
17	9	(New Zealand) Scott Dixon W	Chip Ganassi Racing	Honda	23.2962	17							
18	26	(United States) Colton Herta	Andretti Global	Honda	23.3342	18							
19	27	(United States) Kyle Kirkwood	Andretti Global	Honda	23.3613	19							
20	78	(United States) Conor Daly	Juncos Hollinger Racing	Chevrolet	23.4080	20							
21	41	(United States) Sting Ray Robb	A. J. Foyt Enterprises	Chevrolet	23.4241	21							
22	51	(United Kingdom) Katherine Legge	Dale Coyne Racing	Honda	23.4630	22							
23	20	(Denmark) Christian Rasmussen R	Ed Carpenter Racing	Chevrolet	23.5776	23							
24	4	(Cayman Islands) Kyffin Simpson R	Chip Ganassi Racing	Honda	23.6228	24							
25	45	(Denmark) Christian Lundgaard	Rahal Letterman Lanigan Racing	Honda	23.8450	25							
26	15	(United States) Graham Rahal	Rahal Letterman Lanigan Racing	Honda	24.0050	26							
27	30	(Brazil) Pietro Fittipaldi	Rahal Letterman Lanigan Racing	Honda	24.7289	27							
Official Report

=== Race classification ===
Pos	No.	Driver	Team	Engine	Laps	Time Took	Pit Stops	Grid	Laps Led	Pts.
1	3	(New Zealand) Scott McLaughlin	Team Penske	Chevrolet	250	02:06:31.3981	6	2	85	53
2	9	(New Zealand) Scott Dixon W	Chip Ganassi Racing	Honda	250	02:06:31.8539	5	17	-	40
3	26	(United States) Colton Herta	Andretti Global with Curb Agajanian	Chevrolet	250	02:06:36.5244	5	18	43	36
4	14	(United States) Santino Ferrucci	A. J. Foyt Enterprises	Chevrolet	250	02:06:42.3810	6	12	6	33
5	28	(Sweden) Marcus Ericsson	Andretti Global	Honda	250	02:06:45.1066	6	16	-	30
6	7	(United States) Alexander Rossi	Arrow McLaren	Chevrolet	250	02:06:45.7286	5	6	46	29
7	21	(Netherlands) Rinus VeeKay	Ed Carpenter Racing	Chevrolet	250	02:06:46.5983	5	15	-	26
8	27	(United States) Kyle Kirkwood	Andretti Global	Honda	250	02:06:46.7200	6	19	-	24
9	77	(France) Romain Grosjean	Juncos Hollinger Racing	Chevrolet	250	02:06:47.5994	5	14	-	22
10	12	(Australia) Will Power W	Team Penske	Chevrolet	250	02:06:51.2558	6	4	64	21
11	60	(Sweden) Felix Rosenqvist	Meyer Shank Racing	Honda	249	02:06:53.2242	6	8	-	19
12	45	(Denmark) Christian Lundgaard	Rahal Letterman Lanigan Racing	Honda	248	02:06:44.7912	5	25	-	18
13	4	(Cayman Islands) Kyffin Simpson R	Chip Ganassi Racing	Honda	248	02:06:50.1355	5	24	-	17
14	18	(United Kingdom) Jack Harvey	Dale Coyne Racing	Honda	247	02:06:48.2333	4	13	-	16
15	51	(United Kingdom) Katherine Legge	Dale Coyne Racing	Honda	246	02:06:51.9006	4	22	2	16
16	20	(Denmark) Christian Rasmussen R	Ed Carpenter Racing	Chevrolet	243	02:06:41.0040	5	23	-	14
17	78	(United States) Conor Daly	Juncos Hollinger Racing	Chevrolet	230	Retired	4	20	-	13
18	41	(United States) Sting Ray Robb	A. J. Foyt Enterprises	Chevrolet	221	Contact	4	21	-	12
19	10	(Spain) Alex Palou	Chip Ganassi Racing	Honda	221	02:06:53.7919	5	10	-	11
20	8	(Sweden) Linus Lundqvist R	Chip Ganassi Racing	Honda	215	Contact	4	5	-	10
21	30	(Brazil) Pietro Fittipaldi	Rahal Letterman Lanigan Racing	Honda	181	Mechanical	2	27	-	9
22	66	(United States) David Malukas	Meyer Shank Racing	Honda	126	Mechanical	2	9	-	8
23	15	(United States) Graham Rahal	Rahal Letterman Lanigan Racing	Honda	123	Contact	2	26	-	7
24	5	(Mexico) Pato O'Ward	Arrow McLaren	Chevrolet	87	Mechanical	1	7	-	6
25	6	(United States) Nolan Siegel R	Arrow McLaren	Chevrolet	24	Mechanical	-	11	-	5
26	11	(New Zealand) Marcus Armstrong	Chip Ganassi Racing	Honda	6	Contact	-	3	-	5
27	2	(United States) Josef Newgarden	Team Penske	Chevrolet	5	Contact	-	1	4	7
Official Report
