= 2024 IndyCar Series =

American auto racing season

2024 IndyCar season
- NTT IndyCar Series

Season
- Races: 18
- Start date: March 10
- End date: September 15

Awards
- Drivers' champion: (Spain) Álex Palou
- Manufacturers' Cup: (United States) Chevrolet
- Rookie of the Year: (Sweden) Linus Lundqvist
- Indianapolis 500 winner: (United States) Josef Newgarden

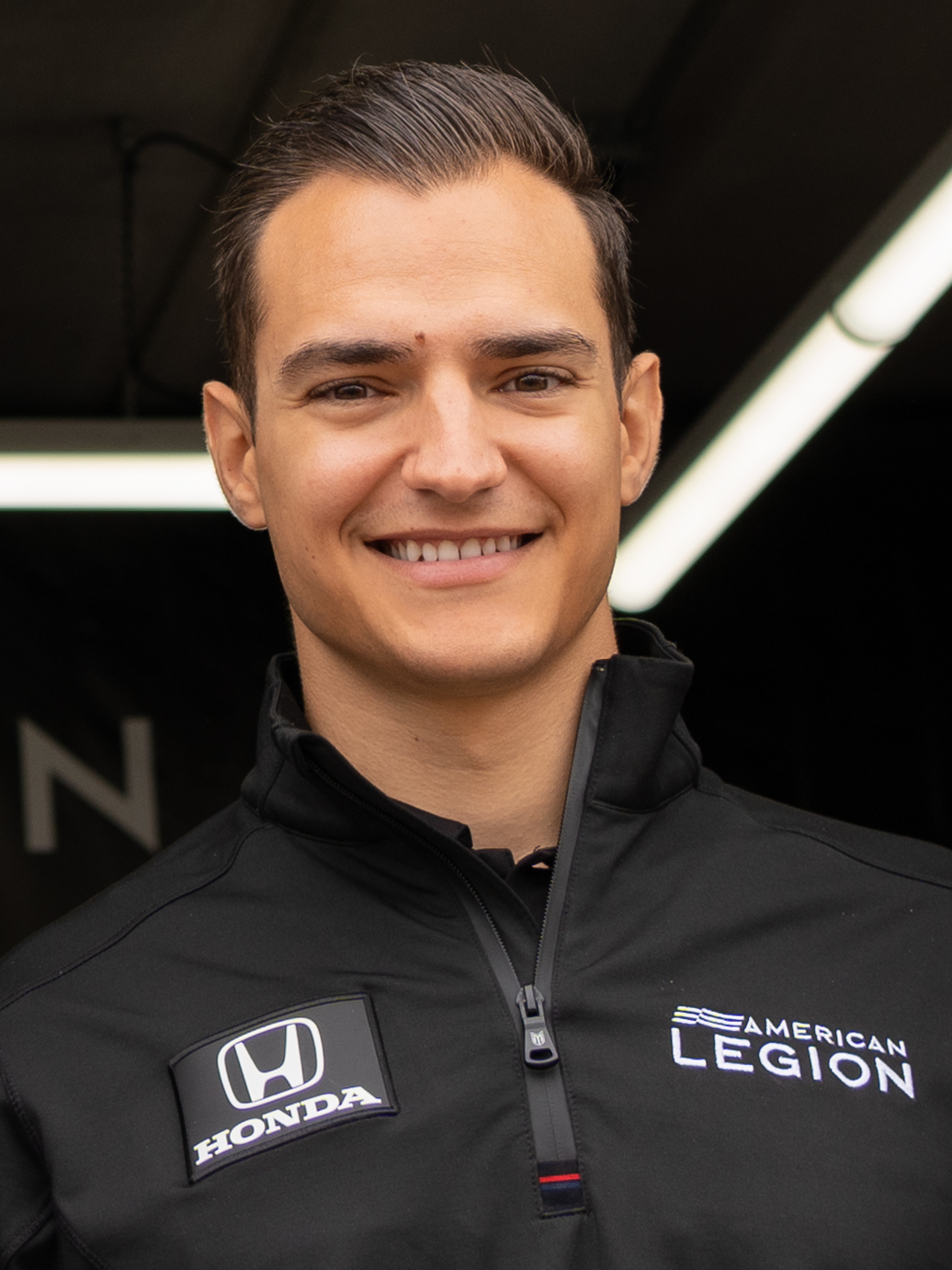
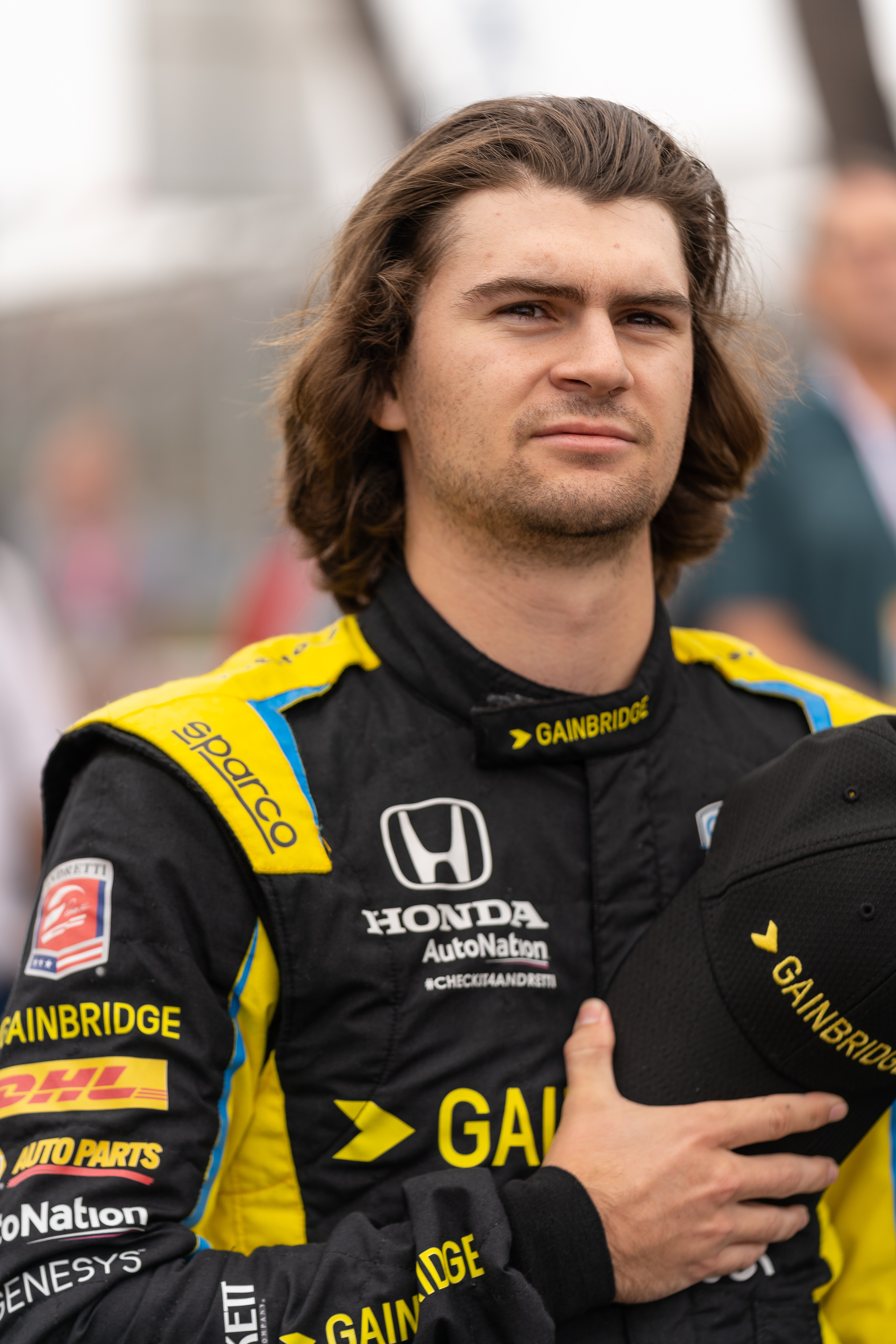
Defending series champion Álex Palou (left) won his third championship; Colton Herta (right) finished second.

The 2024 NTT IndyCar Series was the 113th official championship season of American open-wheel racing and the 29th season under IndyCar Series sanction. Its showcase event was the 108th running of the Indianapolis 500.

Spanish driver Álex Palou entered the season as the defending champion, having obtained his second IndyCar title in 2023, while Josef Newgarden entered the season as the defending Indianapolis 500 winner. Newgarden won his second consecutive Indianapolis 500, the first driver to do so since Hélio Castroneves in 2001 and 2002. Palou defended his championship, becoming the first three-time and back-to-back IndyCar champion in the Dallara DW12 chassis era and also the first since Dario Franchitti in 2011.

== Background and series news ==
The 2.2-liter engines used in the series had hybrid technology implemented after the original plans to debut a new 2.4-liter hybrid engine formula were postponed to 2027. The original plan was to introduce the hybrid powertrain at the start of the season in St. Petersburg, but on December 7, 2023, IndyCar announced a delay to its introduction, until after the Indianapolis 500. IndyCar announced on May 14, 2024, that the new hybrid powertrain would debut at Mid-Ohio.

This was the final year of IndyCar's current television contract with NBC Sports, which began in 2019 and was extended in 2021. For 2025, the series' television coverage moved to Fox for all races.

New race restart procedures were introduced for 2024. On restarts, a new "restart line" was introduced, which drivers had to pass before making overtaking attempts. The rule was introduced in response to a large number of incidents in 2023 that occurred from cars attempting to overtake early on race restarts.

For all oval events, the series mandated new, stronger rear suspension uprights on all cars. The new components were introduced in response to an incident during the 2023 Indianapolis 500 where a rear wheel assembly broke free from a car (specifically the Andretti No. 27 of Kyle Kirkwood who got collected by the spinning Arrow McLaren No. 6 of Felix Rosenqvist) and was launched over the catch fence meant to contain cars to the race circuit.

== Confirmed entries ==
The following teams, entries, and drivers competed in the 2024 NTT IndyCar Series season. All teams used a spec Dallara DW12 chassis with 2018 universal aero kit and Firestone tires.

Team	Engine	No.	Driver(s)	Round(s)	Ref(s)
A. J. Foyt Enterprises (Note: Technical partnership with Team Penske.)	Chevrolet	14	(United States) Santino Ferrucci	All	
A. J. Foyt Enterprises	Chevrolet	41	(United States) Sting Ray Robb	All	
Andretti Global with Curb-Agajanian	Honda	26	(United States) Colton Herta	All	
Andretti Global	Honda	27	(United States) Kyle Kirkwood	All	
Andretti Global	Honda	28	(Sweden) Marcus Ericsson	All	
Andretti Herta with Marco and Curb-Agajanian	Honda	98	(United States) Marco Andretti	5	
Arrow McLaren	Chevrolet	5	(Mexico) Pato O'Ward	All	
Arrow McLaren	Chevrolet	6	(United Kingdom) Callum Ilott	1, 5, NC	
Arrow McLaren	Chevrolet	6	(France) Théo Pourchaire R	2–4, 6–7	
Arrow McLaren	Chevrolet	6	(United States) Nolan Siegel R	8–17	
Arrow McLaren	Chevrolet	7	(United States) Alexander Rossi	All (Note: Practiced for round 12, but withdrew from the event due to a broken right thumb.)	
Arrow McLaren	Chevrolet	7	(France) Théo Pourchaire R	12	
Arrow McLaren/Rick Hendrick	Chevrolet	17	(United States) Kyle Larson R	5	
Chip Ganassi Racing	Honda	4	(Cayman Islands) Kyffin Simpson R	All	
Chip Ganassi Racing	Honda	8	(Sweden) Linus Lundqvist R	All	
Chip Ganassi Racing	Honda	9	(New Zealand) Scott Dixon	All	
Chip Ganassi Racing	Honda	10	(Spain) Álex Palou	All	
Chip Ganassi Racing	Honda	11	(New Zealand) Marcus Armstrong	All	
Dale Coyne Racing	Honda	18	(United Kingdom) Jack Harvey	1–4, 6–11, 13–17 (Note: Practiced and qualified for round 11, but withdrew from the race due to severe neck spasms.)	
Dale Coyne Racing	Honda	18	(United States) Nolan Siegel R	5, NC	
Dale Coyne Racing	Honda	18	(United States) Conor Daly	11	
Dale Coyne Racing	Honda	18	(New Zealand) Hunter McElrea R	12	
Dale Coyne Racing with Rick Ware Racing	Honda	51	(United States) Colin Braun R	1, NC	
Dale Coyne Racing with Rick Ware Racing	Honda	51	(United States) Nolan Siegel R	2	
Dale Coyne Racing with Rick Ware Racing	Honda	51	(Italy) Luca Ghiotto R	3–4, 7–8	
Dale Coyne Racing with Rick Ware Racing	Honda	51	(United Kingdom) Katherine Legge	5, 10–11, 13, 15–17	
Dale Coyne Racing with Rick Ware Racing	Honda	51	(France) Tristan Vautier	6	
Dale Coyne Racing with Rick Ware Racing	Honda	51	(United Kingdom) Toby Sowery R	9, 12, 14	
DRR-Cusick Motorsports	Chevrolet	23	(United States) Ryan Hunter-Reay	5	
DRR-Cusick Motorsports	Chevrolet	24	(United States) Conor Daly	5	
Ed Carpenter Racing	Chevrolet	20	(Denmark) Christian Rasmussen R	1–4, 6–9, 12, 14–17, NC	
Ed Carpenter Racing	Chevrolet	20	(United States) Ed Carpenter	5, 10–11, 13	
Ed Carpenter Racing	Chevrolet	21	(Netherlands) Rinus VeeKay	All	
Ed Carpenter Racing	Chevrolet	33	(Denmark) Christian Rasmussen R	5	
Juncos Hollinger Racing (Note: "Strategic alliance" with Arrow McLaren from rounds 1 to 6.)	Chevrolet	77	(France) Romain Grosjean	All	
Juncos Hollinger Racing	Chevrolet	78	(Argentina) Agustín Canapino	1–6, 8–12, NC	
Juncos Hollinger Racing	Chevrolet	78	(United States) Nolan Siegel R	7	
Juncos Hollinger Racing	Chevrolet	78	(United States) Conor Daly	13–17	
Meyer Shank Racing with Curb-Agajanian (Note: Technical partnership with Andretti Global.)	Honda	06	(Brazil) Hélio Castroneves	5	
Meyer Shank Racing	Honda	60	(Sweden) Felix Rosenqvist	All	
Meyer Shank Racing	Honda	66	(United Kingdom) Tom Blomqvist R	1–5, NC	
Meyer Shank Racing	Honda	66	(Brazil) Hélio Castroneves	6–7	
Meyer Shank Racing	Honda	66	(United States) David Malukas	8–17	
Rahal Letterman Lanigan Racing	Honda	15	(United States) Graham Rahal	All	
Rahal Letterman Lanigan Racing	Honda	30	(Brazil) Pietro Fittipaldi	All	
Rahal Letterman Lanigan Racing	Honda	45	(Denmark) Christian Lundgaard	All	
Rahal Letterman Lanigan Racing	Honda	75	(Japan) Takuma Sato	5	
Rahal Letterman Lanigan Racing	Honda	75	(Estonia) Jüri Vips R	14	
Team Penske	Chevrolet	2	(United States) Josef Newgarden	All	
Team Penske	Chevrolet	3	(New Zealand) Scott McLaughlin	All	
Team Penske	Chevrolet	12	(Australia) Will Power	All	

R Eligible for Rookie of the Year

=== Driver changes ===
==== Preseason ====
- On January 12, 2023, Arrow McLaren confirmed reports that 2021 NASCAR Cup Series champion Kyle Larson would drive for the team in the Indianapolis 500, with the entry to be co-owned by Larson's Cup Series car owner Rick Hendrick.
- On August 11, 2023, Meyer Shank Racing confirmed reports that its IMSA driver Tom Blomqvist would drive for its No. 66 entry full-time in 2024, with 4-time Indianapolis 500 winner Hélio Castroneves moving to an Indy-only role for the team, as well as receiving an ownership stake in the team.
- On August 23, 2023, Andretti Autosport confirmed reports that 2022 Indianapolis 500 winner Marcus Ericsson would join the team, departing Chip Ganassi Racing after four seasons, replacing Romain Grosjean. Ganassi stated on social media the same day that it would announce driver updates "in due course". On August 31, 2023, Chip Ganassi Racing confirmed reports that 2022 Indy Lights champion Linus Lundqvist would join the team on a full-time basis, ultimately replacing Ericsson in the No. 8 car.
- On September 2, 2023, NBC Sports reported that Romain Grosjean told them that he would be departing Andretti Autosport after two seasons with the team.
  - On October 4, 2023, Grosjean released a statement confirming his departure from Andretti, and that he has commenced an arbitration proceeding in Indiana against the team, saying that he had expected to continue racing with the team "in the coming years".
- On September 5, 2023, Meyer Shank Racing confirmed reports that Felix Rosenqvist had signed to drive the No. 60 entry in a multi-year deal. Rosenqvist departed Arrow McLaren after three seasons.
- On September 5, 2023, 2019 Indianapolis 500 winner and 2016 IndyCar Series champion Simon Pagenaud released a statement confirming his departure from Meyer Shank Racing after two seasons, saying that he would be focusing on his recovery from injuries sustained in a crash during practice at Mid-Ohio in 2023.
- On September 7, 2023, Chip Ganassi Racing confirmed reports that Marcus Armstrong had re-signed with the team on a full-time basis with a multi-year contract, having served as road/street course driver alongside Takuma Sato in 2023.
- On September 8, 2023, Arrow McLaren confirmed reports that David Malukas had signed to drive the No. 6 entry full-time in 2024, departing Dale Coyne Racing after two seasons.
- On September 18, 2023, Chip Ganassi Racing announced that development driver Kyffin Simpson would join the team full time in 2024, expanding the team to 5 cars.
- On October 23, 2023, Rahal Letterman Lanigan Racing announced that Haas F1 Team reserve driver Pietro Fittipaldi would drive the team's No. 30 entry full-time in 2024, making his first start in the series since the 2021 season. The same day, RLL confirmed that Jüri Vips, who drove the No. 30 entry in the final two races of 2023, would remain under contract with the team, with the possibility of part-time competition in a fourth entry, testing duties and opportunities in IMSA competition.
- On October 25, 2023, Ed Carpenter Racing announced that 2023 Indy NXT champion Christian Rasmussen would drive the team's No. 20 entry on road and street courses in 2024, and in a third entry at the Indianapolis 500. Team owner/driver Ed Carpenter will compete in all oval races in the No. 20, having driven for the team's third entry for the last two seasons.
- On October 26, 2023, Juncos Hollinger Racing announced that they had mutually decided to part ways with driver Callum Ilott after three seasons together. On November 2, 2023, Juncos confirmed that Romain Grosjean signed for the team, replacing the outgoing Ilott.
- On December 15, 2023, A. J. Foyt Racing announced that Sting Ray Robb would drive the No. 41 entry full-time for the 2024 season, leaving Dale Coyne Racing after one season. Initial reports covering the announcement stated that Robb was to replace Benjamin Pedersen, with the entry being renumbered to 41 from the 55 which Pedersen drove in 2023. However, later that day, Pedersen released a statement on social media implying that he had not left the team and that Robb would be joining as his teammate, with team director Larry Foyt being non-committal when directly asked if Robb was replacing Pedersen during a teleconference with media. On January 9, 2024, Larry Foyt confirmed that Pedersen was departing the team as his contract had "lapsed".
- On February 1, 2024, Dreyer & Reinbold Racing / Cusick Motorsports confirmed plans to field a joint entry for the Indianapolis 500, with Ryan Hunter-Reay and Conor Daly serving as drivers of the No. 23 and No. 24 cars, respectively.
- On February 13, 2024, David Malukas confirmed that he had injured his wrist while mountain biking and would miss the first race of the season to recover. Callum Ilott was announced as his replacement on March 5, and also competed at the non-championship event at The Thermal Club.
- On February 15, Rahal Letterman Lanigan Racing announced that Takuma Sato would return to the team to compete in the Indianapolis 500.
- On March 5, Dale Coyne Racing announced that Jack Harvey would drive the No. 18 entry in 14 races this year, with 2023 Indy NXT rookie of the year Nolan Siegel partaking in events that do not clash with his Indy NXT commitments, including the Indianapolis 500. Coyne also confirmed sports car and former NASCAR driver Colin Braun would drive the No. 51 in at least the Grand Prix of St. Petersburg and the non-championship event at The Thermal Club.

==== Mid-season ====
- Throughout the season, Dale Coyne Racing would announce multiple drivers for its No. 51 entry:
  - On April 9, that Katherine Legge would drive for the No. 51 entry for the Indianapolis 500. Legge returned to the car for all further oval events of the season.
  - On April 15, that Nolan Siegel would switch from the No. 18 to the No. 51 at Long Beach, and that Jack Harvey would race the No. 18 at Long Beach, extending his program in that entry to 15 races.
  - On April 25, that former Williams F1 test driver Luca Ghiotto would drive the No. 51 at Barber Motorsports Park and the Indianapolis Grand Prix. On June 4, Ghiotto was announced to return to the car for Road America and Laguna Seca.
  - On May 29, that 2013 IndyCar Series rookie of the year Tristan Vautier would drive the No. 51 at Detroit.
  - On June 26, that former Indy NXT driver Toby Sowery would drive the No. 51 at Mid-Ohio, making his IndyCar debut. On July 17, it was announced that Sowery would make two additional starts in Toronto and Portland.
- On April 9, Arrow McLaren confirmed that David Malukas would miss the second round at Long Beach and that Callum Ilott was unavailable due to a conflicting FIA World Endurance Championship round. On April 18, reigning Formula 2 champion Théo Pourchaire was announced as the driver of the No. 6 car for Long Beach. On April 23, Pourchaire was confirmed to drive at Barber.
- On April 29, Arrow McLaren announced the release of Malukas from his contract, citing the reason that he still had no confirmed return date from the wrist injuries sustained in the mountain bike accident on February 11. On May 9, Pourchaire was confirmed to drive the No. 6 for the remainder of the season, bar the Indianapolis 500 in which Ilott will drive.
- On May 29, Meyer Shank Racing announced that Hélio Castroneves would drive the No. 66 at Detroit and Road America, replacing Tom Blomqvist. Blomqvist remained signed to a multi-year contract with the team, but Marshall Pruett of RACER.com reported that it was "unclear" whether or not he would return to the entry. On June 7, Meyer Shank Racing announced that David Malukas would drive the No. 66 in all races after Road America, also confirming that Blomqvist would not return to the entry.
- On June 7, Juncos Hollinger Racing announced that Nolan Siegel would drive the No. 78 entry at Road America, with Agustín Canapino taking a "leave of absence" following the online abuse from some of Canapino's fans directed at Théo Pourchaire following the Detroit Grand Prix.
- On June 18, Arrow McLaren announced that Nolan Siegel had signed a multi-year contract for the No. 6 and would be driving for the remainder of the season, replacing Pourchaire.
  - With Siegel having been scheduled to drive the No. 18 car for Dale Coyne Racing in Toronto prior to signing with Arrow McLaren, it was announced on July 16 that 2023 Indy NXT runner-up Hunter McElrea would drive the No. 18 car at the event.
- On July 14, following Jack Harvey's withdrawal from the event due to neck pains, Conor Daly drove for Dale Coyne Racing's No. 18 entry for the second Iowa race as an injury substitute.
- On July 19, Arrow McLaren confirmed that Alexander Rossi suffered a broken right thumb in practice for the race in Toronto and was not medically cleared to continue in the event. Théo Pourchaire replaced Rossi in Toronto. On August 8, Rossi was confirmed to make his return at Gateway.
- On August 7, Agustín Canapino and Juncos Hollinger Racing parted ways. On August 14, Conor Daly was announced as Canapino's replacement for the remainder of the season.
- On August 7, Rahal Letterman Lanigan Racing announced that Jüri Vips would drive for the team in a fourth car for the round at Portland International Raceway.
- On August 28, Ed Carpenter Racing announced that Christian Rasmussen would replace owner/driver Ed Carpenter in the final three races of the season in the No. 20 entry.

=== Team changes ===
==== Preseason ====
- On September 5, 2023, Andretti Autosport announced a rebrand that would take effect for the 2024 season, with all of its race teams running under the Andretti Global banner.
- On October 3, 2023, Arrow McLaren and Juncos Hollinger Racing announced the formation of a strategic alliance that "may evolve over time", beginning with a "commercial and strategic focus" and "talent development opportunity".
- On November 10, 2023, Andretti Global confirmed that they would drop to three entries from four for the 2024 season.

==== Mid-season ====
- Abel Motorsports was planning to enter the Indy 500, but the team shelved its efforts on May 3 due to lack of sponsorship.
- On June 6, Arrow McLaren terminated the strategic alliance with Juncos Hollinger Racing, citing the online abuse including death threats directed towards McLaren driver Théo Pourchaire from fans of JHR driver Agustín Canapino following the race at Detroit, and Canapino's response to the incidents.

== Schedule ==
The schedule was released on September 25, 2023.

Icon	Legend
O	Oval/Speedway
R	Road course
S	Street circuit
NC	Non-championship race

Rd.	Date	Race name	Track	Location
1	March 10	Firestone Grand Prix of St. Petersburg	S Streets of St. Petersburg	St. Petersburg, Florida
NC	March 24	$1 Million Challenge	R The Thermal Club	Thermal, California
2	April 21	Acura Grand Prix of Long Beach	S Streets of Long Beach	Long Beach, California
3	April 28	Children's of Alabama Indy Grand Prix	R Barber Motorsports Park	Birmingham, Alabama
4	May 11	Sonsio Grand Prix	R Indianapolis Motor Speedway Road Course	Speedway, Indiana
5	May 26	108th Running of the Indianapolis 500	O Indianapolis Motor Speedway	Speedway, Indiana
6	June 2	Chevrolet Detroit Grand Prix	S Streets of Detroit	Detroit, Michigan
7	June 9	XPEL Grand Prix at Road America	R Road America	Elkhart Lake, Wisconsin
8	June 23	Firestone Grand Prix of Monterey	R WeatherTech Raceway Laguna Seca	Monterey, California
9	July 7	Honda Indy 200 at Mid-Ohio	R Mid-Ohio Sports Car Course	Lexington, Ohio
10	July 13	Hy-Vee Homefront 250	O Iowa Speedway	Newton, Iowa
11	July 14	Hy-Vee One Step 250	O Iowa Speedway	Newton, Iowa
12	July 21	Ontario Honda Dealers Indy Toronto	S Exhibition Place	Toronto, Ontario
13	August 17	Bommarito Automotive Group 500	O World Wide Technology Raceway	Madison, Illinois
14	August 25	BitNile.com Grand Prix of Portland	R Portland International Raceway	Portland, Oregon
15	August 31	Hy-Vee Milwaukee Mile 250 – Race 1	O Milwaukee Mile	West Allis, Wisconsin
16	September 1	Hy-Vee Milwaukee Mile 250 – Race 2	O Milwaukee Mile	West Allis, Wisconsin
17	September 15	Big Machine Music City Grand Prix	O Nashville Superspeedway	Lebanon, Tennessee

=== Schedule changes ===
- On August 3, 2023, IndyCar announced that the Music City Grand Prix would host the season finale from 2024 onwards. The 2024 race was scheduled to feature a new layout running through Broadway in Downtown Nashville, but still featuring the Korean War Memorial Bridge. Laguna Seca's date was moved to June to accommodate this. On February 14, 2024 – and due to anticipated construction beginning on the New Nissan Stadium which would interfere with the circuit – the race was moved 30 miles (48 kilometres) east to Nashville Superspeedway in Lebanon, Tennessee, for the first IndyCar race at the track since 2008.
- On September 10, 2023, it was announced that The Thermal Club would host an exhibition race on March 24, 2024, with the winner earning $1 million. The event was the first non-points paying event since the 2008 Nikon Indy 300 at Surfers Paradise, and the first American Championship car race in Riverside County, California since 1983.
- On September 25, 2023, IndyCar released the 2024 schedule. The Texas race, which had been a feature of the schedule from the 1996–97 season, did not return in 2024. Additionally, the Gallagher Grand Prix, the second road course date at Indianapolis, did not return in 2024, as NASCAR returned to the oval for the Brickyard 400 instead of the road course they had used since 2020, ending the joint IndyCar–NASCAR weekend where both series raced at the same venue on the same weekend. Both races were replaced by the Milwaukee Mile Doubleheader. Night races were also reintroduced for the Saturday Iowa race and Gateway.

== Results ==
Rd.	Race	Pole position	Fastest lap	Most laps led	Race winner			Report
Rd.	Race	Pole position	Fastest lap	Most laps led	Driver	Team	Manufacturer	Report
1	St. Petersburg	(United States) Josef Newgarden	(Cayman Islands) Kyffin Simpson (Note: Josef Newgarden originally claimed the fastest lap, but was disqualified a month later for violating push-to-pass parameters. Kyffin Simpson inherited the fastest lap.)	—N/a (Note: Josef Newgarden led 92 of the 100 laps, but was disqualified from the race. Christian Lundgaard led the second highest number of laps, with seven. No points were awarded for leading the most laps.)	(Mexico) Pato O'Ward (Note: Josef Newgarden finished first on track, but was disqualified a month later for violating push-to-pass parameters. Pato O'Ward inherited the win.)	Arrow McLaren	Chevrolet	Report
NC	Thermal Club	(Spain) Álex Palou (Note: Pole position for the "Sprint for the Purse" was determined by the fastest qualifying time of the two heat winners.)	(Spain) Álex Palou	(Spain) Álex Palou	(Spain) Álex Palou	Chip Ganassi Racing	Honda	Report
2	Long Beach	(Sweden) Felix Rosenqvist	(Sweden) Marcus Ericsson	(New Zealand) Scott Dixon	(New Zealand) Scott Dixon	Chip Ganassi Racing	Honda	Report
3	Barber	(New Zealand) Scott McLaughlin	(New Zealand) Scott McLaughlin	(New Zealand) Scott McLaughlin	(New Zealand) Scott McLaughlin	Team Penske	Chevrolet	Report
4	IMS GP	(Spain) Álex Palou	(Spain) Álex Palou	(Spain) Álex Palou	(Spain) Álex Palou	Chip Ganassi Racing	Honda	Report
5	Indianapolis 500	(New Zealand) Scott McLaughlin	(Denmark) Christian Lundgaard	(New Zealand) Scott McLaughlin	(United States) Josef Newgarden	Team Penske	Chevrolet	Report
6	Detroit	(United States) Colton Herta	(United States) Colton Herta	(New Zealand) Scott Dixon	(New Zealand) Scott Dixon	Chip Ganassi Racing	Honda	Report
7	Road America	(Sweden) Linus Lundqvist	(New Zealand) Scott Dixon	(New Zealand) Scott McLaughlin	(Australia) Will Power	Team Penske	Chevrolet	Report
8	Laguna Seca	(Spain) Álex Palou	(Sweden) Marcus Ericsson	(Spain) Álex Palou	(Spain) Álex Palou	Chip Ganassi Racing	Honda	Report
9	Mid-Ohio	(Spain) Álex Palou	(United States) Josef Newgarden	(Spain) Álex Palou	(Mexico) Pato O'Ward	Arrow McLaren	Chevrolet	Report
10	Iowa 1	(United States) Colton Herta	(United States) Josef Newgarden	(New Zealand) Scott McLaughlin	(New Zealand) Scott McLaughlin	Team Penske	Chevrolet	Report
11	Iowa 2	(New Zealand) Scott McLaughlin	(United States) Josef Newgarden	(Spain) Álex Palou	(Australia) Will Power	Team Penske	Chevrolet	Report
12	Toronto	(United States) Colton Herta	(New Zealand) Scott Dixon	(United States) Colton Herta	(United States) Colton Herta	Andretti Global with Curb-Agajanian	Honda	Report
13	Gateway	(New Zealand) Scott McLaughlin	(United States) Josef Newgarden	(Australia) Will Power	(United States) Josef Newgarden	Team Penske	Chevrolet	Report
14	Portland	(United States) Santino Ferrucci	(United States) David Malukas	(Australia) Will Power	(Australia) Will Power	Team Penske	Chevrolet	Report
15	Milwaukee 1	(New Zealand) Scott McLaughlin	(New Zealand) Scott McLaughlin	(Mexico) Pato O'Ward	(Mexico) Pato O'Ward	Arrow McLaren	Chevrolet	Report
16	Milwaukee 2	(United States) Josef Newgarden	(New Zealand) Scott Dixon	(New Zealand) Scott McLaughlin	(New Zealand) Scott McLaughlin	Team Penske	Chevrolet	Report
17	Nashville	(United States) Kyle Kirkwood	(Mexico) Pato O'Ward	(United States) Kyle Kirkwood	(United States) Colton Herta	Andretti Global with Curb-Agajanian	Honda	Report

== Season report ==
=== Opening rounds ===
The 2024 season opened as usual with the Grand Prix of St. Petersburg, where Team Penske's Josef Newgarden took pole position ahead of MSR's Felix Rosenqvist. He started the race on the harder tires and held his lead over Rosenqvist on soft tires. The opening part of the race saw most drivers save fuel, before CGR's Marcus Armstrong hit the wall to bring out a caution. When the field pitted, the tight pitlane saw Newgarden have a slower stop. He lost out to Rosenqvist and Andretti's Colton Herta, but it only took him a few laps on fresh soft tires to move into the lead again. McLaren's Pato O'Ward followed him through and shadowed him throughout the rest of the race. The final pit stops then saw Herta rise to third, but a poor restart after a caution dropped him behind the Penskes of Scott McLaughlin and Will Power. Weeks after the race, IndyCar disqualified Newgarden and McLaughlin and penalized Power by ten points for the illegal use of push-to-pass. This meant O'Ward won the race ahead of Power and Herta.

The non-points paying $1 Million Challenge at Thermal offered an altered weekend structure: the field was split in two groups, with CGR teammates Rosenqvist and Álex Palou topping the qualifying sessions of their respective groups. Two heat races were held, one for each group. The first heat race began with chaos when Herta and CGR's Scott Dixon crashed, taking out JHR's Romain Grosjean. Rosenqvist kept first place ahead of McLaughlin and Newgarden. The second heat race was without incident, as Palou led from start to finish ahead of his teammates Marcus Armstrong and Linus Lundqvist. The top six of each heat race advanced to the final. After strong starts by Palou and McLaughlin, who jumped to second, the order remained largely static. Drivers had to take extreme measures to conserve tires, so Palou led McLaughlin and Rosenqvist home. The event drew mixed feedback, with drivers enjoying a change in format, but many also feeling the championship could have switched things up more.

Round three, the Acura Grand Prix of Long Beach, saw Rosenqvist take MSR’s maiden IndyCar pole position. His race pace was less convincing though, as he spent the opening part of the race dropping down the order. The Penske pair of Newgarden and Power led Andretti's Marcus Ericsson, before a caution on lap 16 caused a split in race strategies: Power and Dixon pitted under caution, which saw them move into the lead when the rest of the field stopped. During that phase, Dixon was able to pass Power before the pair made their next stop. Newgarden, still the leader on his strategy, came out second after his last stop, ahead of Herta and in pursuit of a fuel-saving Dixon. The five seconds between the pair soon evaporated, with Herta and Palou also closing up to create a four-car battle. Newgarden and Herta then collided in the final corner, with the former dropping to fourth. This delayed the lead battle just enough to enable Dixon to win by 0.9 seconds. With O'Ward down in 16th, Dixon took the championship lead.

Next up was the Children's of Alabama Indy Grand Prix, which McLaughlin started from pole position ahead of Power. The pair held their spots throughout an early caution, before Power ran off track on lap 23 and RLL's Christian Lundgaard was able to pass him. The Dane then kicked off the first round of stops, with Power and McLaughlin following suit. When McLaren's Alexander Rossi lost one of his rear wheels to cause another yellow on lap 43, the leaders opted to pit again, shuffling Palou into the lead. Another caution followed to bring McLaughlin up the order again. He retook the lead when the last remaining car pitted on lap 70, before making his final stop with 15 laps to go to come out ahead of Power and Palou. Lundqvist took third place from Palou shortly before a late caution set up a two-lap dash to the finish. McLaughlin controlled that final part to claim the win, with Lundqvist taking his maiden podium. Dixon had a difficult race that ended 15th, while Herta - who recovered from a crash to finish eighth - took the standings lead.

The Month of May began with the Sonsio Grand Prix and Palou narrowly beating Lundgaard to pole position. The Dane however got the better start and moved into the lead at the first turn of the race. Power in third was the first to make his opening stop, with the top two following two laps later. Stopping earlier allowed Power to move past Palou into second, so he tried the same approach on the second round of stops and pitted first again. Lundgaard covered him off straight away to stay in front of him, but Palou stayed out a lap longer. The Spaniard then delivered a brilliant inlap that, coupled with a quick stop and a faultless outlap, saw him take the lead. During the final round of stops, Power was then able to surpass Lundgaard to claim second. After a late safety car Power pushed to take the lead but almost lost out to Lundgaard when Palou defended his first place. Points leader Herta made the most out of a bad qualifying to rise from 24th to seventh, but still dropped to third in the standings behind Palou and Power.

McLaughlin claimed pole position for the 108th Running of the Indianapolis 500 with a record four-lap pole speed. The race was delayed by four hours because of rain, and when it got underway, McLaughlin led his teammates Newgarden and Power throughout the opening stages. The first half of the race saw five safety car interruptions, with attrition high across the whole field. Multiple Honda-powered cars suffered engine issues and Herta crashed from second place on lap 88. Dixon, McLaughlin and Newgarden then swapped the race lead multiple times, before Power was the next frontrunner to crash his car on lap 147 and McLaughlin was hit with a clutch issue. Rossi and O'Ward had entered the fight for the lead by that time, both passing Dixon to set out after Newgarden. O'Ward took the lead with five laps to go before Newgarden retook it. O'Ward moved back into the lead on the final lap, but Newgarden pulled off an astonishing move two corners later to become the first back-to-back Indy 500 winner since Hélio Castroneves in 2002.

=== Mid-season rounds ===
Newgarden only had a week to celebrate his win before the Chevrolet Detroit Grand Prix, where Herta was fastest in a disrupted qualifying session. After the usual chaos at the start, the first caution came out right after the drivers on soft tires had made their first stop. Another caution came out on lap 33, with Herta pitting under yellow two laps later. Shortly after, it started to rain, and most of the field opted to pit for wet-weather tires. This saw Lundgaard, Andretti's Kyle Kirkwood and Dixon shuffle to the front after they stayed out - the right decision, as the rain soon started easing off while the race was still under caution. Kirkwood took the lead at the restart, before another caution enabled the drivers on wet tires to return to slicks. A flurry of cautions, restarts and subsequent cautions followed, with Dixon pitting with 44 laps left and then shuffling to the front. Another masterful fuel-saving display by Dixon saw him defend this lead, first from Kirkwood and then from both Ericsson and Armstrong, to take the win and the points lead.

Lundqvist overcame wet conditions and a stoppage after a heavy crash for Newgarden to take his maiden pole position at the XPEL Grand Prix at Road America. His advantage was short-lived, however, as he was rear-ended and spun around by Armstrong into the opening corner. This saw Kirkwood take the lead before McLaughlin overtook him at the subsequent restart. He led until the first round of stops, where Newgarden overcut his opposition to move into second and Kirkwood dropped back. Dixon and Power were behind them, before Dixon dropped down the order when his softer tires fell off, leaving the Penske trio at the top. Another round of stops followed, with McLaughlin defending his lead again. Crucially, Newgarden was able to pit onto hard tires, while McLaughlin and Power had to run softs, so he was able to claim the lead later in the stint. The final sequence of stops then saw Power stay out longer to overcut his teammates and take his first win since 2022. This also saw him take the championship lead by five points over Palou.

Next up was the Firestone Grand Prix of Monterey, where Palou took pole position while points leader Power only managed 15th. Kirkwood took the lead from Palou through the opening sequence of corners. He held on to a narrow sub-one second advantage through the first pit stop cycle until Rossi, who was the last to pit, overcut three cars to climb to the top. When a caution came out on lap 35, Rossi opted to take his second stop, allowing Palou back into the lead. He led O’Ward and Grosjean at the restart, before the Frenchman took second from the Mexican. The next round of stops saw Herta and Rossi move back in front of Palou, but the Spaniard on fresh soft tires made quick work of the leading pair to retake the lead by lap 64. He held that advantage through the final pit stop cycle. The race ended in multiple successive cautions, but Palou managed the restarts and held on to take the win. Power was able to recover to seventh after running off track at the start, but still had to cede the championship lead to Power by 23 points.

The Honda Indy 200 at Mid-Ohio saw the introduction of the hybrid technology, and Palou took the first hybrid-powered pole position. The hybrid’s first laps were under caution though, as Dixon had to park his car during the warm-up laps with an issue with said system. Palou led O’Ward and MSR’s David Malukas until the first pit stop cycle, where Malukas stalled to drop out of contention. O’Ward was faster than Palou throughout the second stint and closed the gap to the lead before electing to pit again on lap 54. When Palou came in a lap later, he had a slow stop, so O’Ward took first place. With McLaughlin in third, Palou began hunting O’Ward. He had caught him with 15 laps to go, just as the Mexican caught up to two backmarkers. The gap for the lead soon dropped below half a second. With the track offering little opportunity to pass, he was unable to lap the cars in front, but it also helped him hold Palou back to take the win. Power had to endure another tough weekend and finished eleventh, now 48 points behind Palou.

Hybrid issues plagued qualifying at Iowa, with multiple drivers unable to deploy energy from their hybrid systems. Herta and McLaughlin shared pole positions. Herta led the opening part of the Hy-Vee Homefront 250, throughout an early caution, before another interruption on lap 80 prompted the leaders to take their first stop. McLaughlin came out in the lead, while points leader Palou stalled in the pitlane. After being unable to overtake McLaughlin, Herta started struggling on his tires. He came to pit road on lap 175, just as Palou spun across the start/finish line and crashed into the wall. This inconvenient caution removed Herta from contention, with McLaughlin leading O’Ward and Dixon to the restart. Two more cautions and a waved-off restart left the field with twelve laps to go, in which McLaughlin held off O’Ward to win his first oval while Newgarden moved past Dixon into third. With Palou classified in 23rd, his only positive was that Power had another bad race and finished in 18th, keeping the damage to Palou’s points lead minimal.

A day later, the Hy-Vee One Step 250 began in rather similar fashion, as polesitter McLaughlin led Palou through the opening stint of the race before pitting on lap 96. Palou came in on lap 100, just as a caution came out. This cycled Power to the front and handed him a cheap pitstop that shuffled him to second. The front remained static at the restart, before Power began pressuring Palou after the halfway point. He did not make a move though, waiting for a better opportunity. That came through the second round of stops, where he kept out a lap longer than Palou and spent less time on pit road to come out in the lead. Power managed his lead through oncoming backmarker traffic, keeping Palou in check to reduce his points gap to 35. The final lap was marred by a huge multi-car pileup as Rossi ran out of fuel and he was hit by A. J. Foyt’s Sting Ray Robb, who vaulted into the air and rolled over. The ensuing 109G impact saw Robb momentarily lose consciousness, before he was airlifted to hospital and later confirmed to be okay.

IndyCar’s only abroad event, the Ontario Honda Dealers Indy Toronto, saw Herta take pole position, while Palou was hit with a penalty and had to start 18th. The race start was immediately interrupted by a multi-car crash into the first turn, but when things got going, Herta quickly built a comfortable gap over Kirkwood and Rosenqvist. All three came in to change tires on lap 33, with Rosenqvist then struggling to warm up his new tires before getting passed by Newgarden. The second stint was harder for Herta, as he had to manage a vibration with Kirkwood still staying right behind him. Palou initiated the second round of stops, where Newgarden lost a rear wheel and dropped down the order. allowing Dixon into third. Another multi-car pileup into turn 1 then caused a red flag stoppage after O’Ward spun around and was collected by A. J. Foyt’s Santino Ferrucci. The restart with 20 laps to go was interrupted again, before Herta led the field to his first win since 2022. Palou rose to fourth to extend his points lead to 49 points over Power.

=== Closing rounds ===
The final stretch of races began with the Bommarito Automotive Group 500 and McLaughlin on pole position. Both Malukas and Power were able to pass him at an early restart, before Power moved into the lead. He held that advantage throughout the first round of pit stops and multiple cautions, before Malukas suffered a clutch issue and fell to third behind McLaughlin. After the leaders pitted a second time, Ericsson and Dixon moved into the lead as they were on a different strategy. Power returned to the lead on lap 155 before stopping again, with McLaughlin able to retake third from Newgarden through that cycle. Malukas then made a decisive move on Power for the lead, with the pair colliding and Malukas retiring. That put Newgarden and McLaughlin back up front, and the ensuing restart saw chaos as Power rear-ended Rossi. A red flag came out, and Newgarden led McLaughlin and Lundqvist to the finish afterwards. Palou was fourth again, while Power was classified in 18th and losing ground in the championship fight.

2024's last road course race was the BitNile.com Grand Prix of Portland, where Ferrucci took his maiden pole position, Foyt's first since 2014. Power started second and immediately took the lead into the first corner of the race, before a heavy crash for Dixon interrupted proceedings. Shortly after the restart, Palou moved past Ferrucci to take second. The American then was the first to pit on lap 31, but came back out into traffic that saw him lose touch with the leaders. The top two remained unchanged through the first stop, with Newgarden in third at the half-way point. The second round of stops saw Herta move into the lead momentarily, before he also pitted to hand the lead back to Power on lap 61. He continued holding a two-second lead over Palou as the Spaniard abstained from trying any overly chancy moves. The final round of stops then also brought no changes for the top three, with Herta, the only leading driver on a differing strategy, stalling in the pits. Power won by 9.8 seconds and was now 54 points behind Palou.

The Hy-Vee Milwaukee Mile 250 double-header saw McLaughlin and Newgarden share pole positions. McLaughlin led Lundqvist through the first stint of race one, with the Swede then taking the lead on lap 49. The leading pair pitted on lap 65 and 66, while Herta and O’Ward behind them were able to stop under caution on lap 87. This elevated them to second and third behind McLaughlin. O’Ward then moved past Herta and took the lead on lap 99. The second round of stops saw Newgarden and Palou move up the order as they undercut multiple drivers, before Newgarden collided with Ericsson and both retired. Palou, narrowly avoiding the incident, was second at the restart behind O’Ward and ahead of Power. During the last pit sequence, Herta lost a tire leading to a caution. This saw Ferrucci move up to third. He tried taking the lead, but failed and dropped to fifth. O’Ward won ahead of Power and Conor Daly, who secured JHR’s maiden podium after starting 25th. With Palou fourth, Power slightly reduced his points gap again.

The penultimate race of the season began dramatic: Palou’s car broke down on the warm-up laps, causing the race to start under caution. On the restart, Lundqvist rear-ended Armstrong, who then pivoted pole sitter Newgarden into the barrier. Palou rejoined the race 29 laps down, while Power pressured McLaughlin and took the lead on lap 44. He remained in the lead throughout the next two pitstop cycles, before McLaughlin was able to get back in front during their third pit stops. Rossi and Dixon remained on track to take the lead of the race. A caution followed, and on the subsequent restart Power, who looked on his way to overhaul Palou in the standings, made a mistake and spun. He rejoined a lap down, while the fight for the win was now between McLaughlin, Dixon and Herta. The latter ran a differing strategy that saw him have older tires at the end, which meant he was unable to put up a fight. McLaughlin held Dixon behind him to win the race. Power came tenth and Palou 19th after high attrition, 33 points ahead of Power.

Kirkwook took pole for the Big Machine Music City Grand Prix. He defended against Newgarden at the start, while Power's title hopes faded due to a seatbelt issue that forced him to pit and put him several laps down. Palou surged from 24th to 17th in the opening part of the race. A first caution came on lap 56 after Rosenqvist crashed, with Newgarden leading on the restart. Herta soon challenged Newgarden for the lead, with both drivers on soft tires. A second caution on lap 89 reshuffled the field as Rossi took the lead after skipping a pit stop. Later, Malukas made an inside pass on Newgarden, but Herta overtook him for second. O'Ward led by lap 155 but handed the lead to Herta after a pit stop. With 10 laps to go, Malukas pitted, leaving Herta and O'Ward battling for the win. A late move while lapping Robb allowed Herta to take the lead from O'Ward to claim his maiden oval victory and second in the championship. Palou finished 11th, securing the title, while Power only managed to finish 24th, dropping to fourth in the standings.

Álex Palou's third championship was not as dominant as his second, but once again characterised by a remarkable consistency that saw him finish in the top five 14 times out of 18 races. Still, Palou's rivals made a step closer to him than in the year before. Both McLaughlin and Power had runs that brought them close to threatening Palou, but with McLaughlin disqualified from St. Petersburg and Power failing to capitalise on both Palou’s mistake at Iowa and his technical troubles at Milwaukee, there never was a serious championship challenge. Away from the championship picture, IndyCar introduced the hybrid system, a technical change that brought a few initial issues and drew questions about its impact on the series’ amount of on-track action. The Penske push-to-pass scandal also raised credibility issues, with many wondering if such an action could be an error or intentional. Still, IndyCar’s final season on NBC drew continually high viewership numbers, even with the Olympic Games being prioritized by the network.

== Points standings ==
- Ties were broken by number of wins, followed by number of 2nds, 3rds, etc.; then by finishing position in the previous race; then by random draw.

Position	1st	2nd	3rd	4th	5th	6th	7th	8th	9th	10th	11th	12th	13th	14th	15th	16th	17th	18th	19th	20th	21st	22nd	23rd	24th	25th+
Points	50	40	35	32	30	28	26	24	22	20	19	18	17	16	15	14	13	12	11	10	9	8	7	6	5

=== Driver standings ===
- At all races except the Indy 500, the pole position qualifier earned 1 point (unless qualifying is not held). The twelve Indy 500 qualifiers who qualified for the fast 12 session received points based on the results of that session, descending from 12 points for first place.
- Drivers who led at least one race lap were awarded 1 point. The driver who led the most laps during a race scored an additional 2 points.
- Entrant-initiated engine change-outs before the engine reached their required distance run resulted in the loss of 10 points.

Pos	Driver	STP	THE	LBH	BAR	IGP	INDY	DET	ROA	LAG	MOH	IOW		TOR	GTW	POR	MIL		NSS	Pts
1	(Spain) Álex Palou	4	**1**^{L}*	3	5^{L}	**1**^{L}*	5^{L}	16^{L}	4^{L}	**1**^{L}*	**2**^{L}*	23	2^{L}*	4	4	2^{L}	5	19	11	544
2	(United States) Colton Herta	3^{L}	4	2^{L}	8	7	23	**19**^{L}	6^{L}	2^{L}	4	**11**^{L}	5	**1**^{L}*	5	4^{L}	22^{L}	3^{L}	1^{L}	513
3	(New Zealand) Scott McLaughlin	27	2	26	**1**^{L}*	6^{L}	**6**^{1L}*	20	3^{L}*	21	3^{L}	1^{L}*	**3**^{L}	16	**2**^{L}	7	**8**^{L}	1^{L}*	5	505
4	(Australia) Will Power	2	DNQ	6^{L}	2^{L}	2	24^{2}	6	1^{L}	7	11	18	1^{L}	12	18^{L}*	1^{L}*	2^{L}	10^{L}	24	498
5	(Mexico) Pato O'Ward	1	DNQ	16	23	13	2^{8L}	7	8	8	1^{L}	2	6	17	26	15	1^{L}*	24	2^{L}	460
6	(New Zealand) Scott Dixon	7	DNQ	1^{L}*	15	4^{L}	3^{L}	1^{L}*	21	6	27	4	4	3^{L}	11^{L}	28	10	2	17	456
7	(United States) Kyle Kirkwood	10	DNQ	7^{L}	10	11	7^{11L}	4^{L}	5^{L}	5^{L}	8	7	16	2	22	10	12	8	**4**^{L}*	420
8	(United States) Josef Newgarden	**26**	8	4^{L}	16	17	1^{3L}	26^{L}	2^{L}	19^{L}	25	3	7	11	1^{L}	3^{L}	26	**27**^{L}	3^{L}	401
9	(United States) Santino Ferrucci	9	DNQ	21	7^{L}	27	8^{6L}	9	15	9	10	6	11	20	12	**8**	4	4^{L}	6	367
10	(United States) Alexander Rossi	6	7	10	25	8^{L}	4^{4L}	5	18	3^{L}	6	8	15	Wth	19^{L}	12	7	6^{L}	15^{L}	366
11	(Denmark) Christian Lundgaard	18^{L}	9	23	6	3^{L}	13^{L}	11^{L}	11	15	7	22	17	7	15	13	9	12	19	312
12	(Sweden) Felix Rosenqvist	5	3	**9**^{L}	4^{L}	10	27^{9}	8	14^{L}	11	14	13	26	23	6	14	13	11	27	306
13	(Netherlands) Rinus VeeKay	8	DNQ	14	17	26	9^{7L}	14	24	26	19	5	9	8	10	11	14	7	12	300
14	(New Zealand) Marcus Armstrong	25	5	12	9	5^{L}	30	3	26	22	17	10	19	5	8	5^{L}	21	26	7	298
15	(Sweden) Marcus Ericsson	23	DNQ	5	18	16	33	2	9	10	5	9	23	18^{L}	24^{L}	6	27	5	25	297
16	(Sweden) Linus Lundqvist RY	21	6	13	3^{L}	24	28	22	**12**	17	15	21	12^{L}	13	3^{L}	23	6^{L}	20	8	279
17	(France) Romain Grosjean	22	DNQ	8	12	12	19	23	7	4	23	24	10	9	16	27	24	9	16	260
18	(United States) Graham Rahal	14	11	17	11	9^{L}	15	15	10	24	18	16	8	10	23^{L}	9	20	23	23	251
19	(Brazil) Pietro Fittipaldi	13	12	24	27	14^{L}	32	13	16	14	24	19	20	19	14	25	18	21	21	186
20	(United States) Sting Ray Robb	24	DNQ	18	26	22	16^{L}	21	17	20	16	15	21	25	9^{L}	18	23	18	20	185
21	(Cayman Islands) Kyffin Simpson R	12	DNQ	19	14	15	21^{L}	24	27	23	21	14	18	22	25	16	25	13	22	182
22	(Denmark) Christian Rasmussen R	19	DNQ	27	24	20	12	27	20	13	9			27		26	11	16	14	163
23	(United States) Nolan Siegel R		DNQ	20			DNQ		23	12	20	12	14	21	7^{L}	21	17	25	18	154
24	(United States) David Malukas									16	12	26	13	6	21^{L}	20	15	22	9^{L}	148
25	(United Kingdom) Jack Harvey	17		25	13	18		17	25	25	26	25	Wth		20	24	16	14	13	143
26	(United States) Conor Daly						10^{L}						27		13	22	3	17	10	119
27	(Argentina) Agustín Canapino	16	10	15	20	21	22	12		18	22	27	25	26						109
28	(France) Théo Pourchaire R			11	22	19		10	13					14						91
29	(United Kingdom) Katherine Legge						29					17	24		27		19	15^{L}	26	61
30	(United Kingdom) Tom Blomqvist R	15	DNQ	22	19	23	31													46
31	(United Kingdom) Toby Sowery R										13			15		17				45
32	(United States) Ed Carpenter						17^{L}					20	22		17					45
33	(United Kingdom) Callum Ilott	11	DNQ				11^{L}													39
34	(Italy) Luca Ghiotto R				21	25			22	27										27
35	(Brazil) Hélio Castroneves						20	25	19											26
36	(United States) Kyle Larson R						18^{5L}													21
37	(Japan) Takuma Sato						14^{10}													19
38	(France) Tristan Vautier							18												12
39	(Estonia) Jüri Vips R															19				11
40	(United States) Colin Braun R	20	DNQ																	10
41	(New Zealand) Hunter McElrea R													24						6
42	(United States) Ryan Hunter-Reay						26^{12}													6
43	(United States) Marco Andretti						25													5
Pos	Driver	STP	THE	LBH	BAR	IGP	INDY	DET	ROA	LAG	MOH	IOW		TOR	GTW	POR	MIL		NSS	Pts

Color	Result
Gold	Winner
Silver	2nd-place finish
Bronze	3rd-place finish
Green	Top 5 finish
Light Blue	Top 10 finish
Dark Blue	Other flagged position
Purple	Did not finish
Red	Did not qualify (DNQ)
Brown	Withdrew (Wth)
Black	Disqualified (DSQ)
White	Did Not Start (DNS)
White	Race abandoned (C)
Blank	Did not participate

**In-line notation**
**Bold**	Pole position (1 point; except Indy)
Italics	Ran fastest race lap
^{L}	Led race lap (1 point)
*	Led most race laps (2 points)
^{1–12}	Indy 500 "Fast Twelve" bonus points
^{c}	Qualifying canceled (no bonus point)
RY	Rookie of the Year
R	Rookie

=== Entrant standings ===
- Only full-time entries shown. Light-gray background indicates non-Leader's Circle entries for the 2024 season.

Pos	Entrant	STP	LBH	BAR	IGP	INDY	DET	ROA	LAG	MOH	IOW		TOR	GTW	POR	MIL		NSS	Pts
1	#10 Chip Ganassi Racing	4	3	5^{L}	**1**^{L}*	5	16^{L}	4^{L}	**1**^{L}*	**2**^{L}*	23	2^{L}*	4	4	2^{L}	5	19	11	544
2	#26 Andretti Global with Curb-Agajanian	3^{L}	2^{L}	8	7	23	**19**^{L}	6^{L}	2^{L}	4	**11**^{L}	5	**1**^{L}*	5	4^{L}	22^{L}	3^{L}	1^{L}	513
3	#3 Team Penske	27	26	**1**^{L}*	6^{L}	**6**^{L1}*	20	3^{L}*	21	3^{L}	1^{L}*	**3**^{L}	16	**2**^{L}	7	**8**^{L}	1^{L}*	5	505
4	#12 Team Penske	2	6^{L}	2^{L}	2	24^{2}	6	1^{L}	7	11	18	1^{L}	12	18*^{L}	1^{L}*	2^{L}	10^{L}	24	498
5	#5 Arrow McLaren	1	16	23	13	2^{L8}	7	8	8	1^{L}	2	6	17	26	15	1^{L}*	24	2^{L}	460
6	#9 Chip Ganassi Racing	7	1^{L}*	15	4^{L}	3^{L}	1^{L}*	21	6	27	4	4	3^{L}	11^{L}	28	10	2	17	456
7	#27 Andretti Global	10	7^{L}	10	11	7^{11}	4^{L}	5^{L}	5^{L}	8	7	16	2	22	10	12	8	**4**^{L}*	420
8	#2 Team Penske	**26**	4^{L}	16	17	1^{L3}	26^{L}	2^{L}	19^{L}	25	3	7	11	1^{L}	3^{L}	27	**27**^{L}	3^{L}	401
9	#7 Arrow McLaren	6	10	25	8^{L}	4^{4}	5	18	3^{L}	6	8	15	14	19^{L}	12	7	6^{L}	15^{L}	382
10	#14 A. J. Foyt Enterprises	9	21	7^{L}	27	8^{6}	9	15	9	10	6	11	20	12	**8**	4	4^{L}	6	367
11	#45 Rahal Letterman Lanigan Racing	18^{L}	23	6	3^{L}	13^{L}	11^{L}	11	15	7	22	17	7	15	13	9	12	19	312
12	#60 Meyer Shank Racing	5	**9**^{L}	4^{L}	10	27^{9}	8	14^{L}	11	14	13	26	23	6	14	13	11	27	306
13	#21 Ed Carpenter Racing	8	14	17	26	9^{L7}	14	24	26	19	5	9	8	10	11	14	7	12	300
14	#11 Chip Ganassi Racing	25	12	9	5^{L}	30	3	26	22	17	10	19	5	8	5^{L}	21	26	7	298
15	#28 Andretti Global	23	5	18	16	32	2	9	10^{L}	5	9	23	18^{L}	24^{L}	6	26	5	25	297
16	#8 Chip Ganassi Racing	21	13	3^{L}	24	28	22	**12**	17	15	21	12^{L}	13	3^{L}	23	6^{L}	20	8	279
17	#77 Juncos Hollinger Racing	22	8	12	12	19	23	7	4	23	24	10	9	16	27	24	9	16	260
18	#6 Arrow McLaren	11	11	22	19	11^{L}	10	13	12	20	12	14	21	7^{L}	21	17	25	18	251
19	#15 Rahal Letterman Lanigan Racing	14	17	11	9^{L}	15	15	10	24	18	16	8	10	23^{L}	9	20	23	23	251
20	#66 Meyer Shank Racing	15	22	19	23	31	25	19	16	12	26	13	6	21^{L}	20	15	22	9^{L}	210
21	#78 Juncos Hollinger Racing	16	15	20	21	22	12	23	18	22	27	25	26	13	22	3	17	10	209
22	#20 Ed Carpenter Racing	19	27	24	20	17^{L}	27	20	13	9	20	22	27	17	26	11	16	14	190
23	#30 Rahal Letterman Lanigan Racing	13	24	27	14^{L}	33	13	16	14	24	19	20	19	14	25	18	21	21	186
Leaders' Circle cutoff
24	#41 A. J. Foyt Enterprises	24	18	26	22	16^{L}	21	17	20	16	15	21	25	9^{L}	18	23	18	20	185
25	#4 Chip Ganassi Racing	12	19	14	15	21^{L}	24	27	23	21	14	18	22	25	16	25	13	22	182
26	#51 Dale Coyne Racing with Rick Ware Racing	20	20	21	25	29	18	22	27	13	17	24	15	27	17	19	15^{L}	26	165
27	#18 Dale Coyne Racing	17	25	13	18	DNQ	17	25	25	26	25	27	24	20	24	16	14	13	154
Pos	Driver	STP	LBH	BAR	IGP	INDY	DET	ROA	LAG	MOH	IOW		TOR	GTW	POR	MIL		NSS	Pts

=== Engine manufacturer standings ===
Pos	Entrant	STP	LBH	BAR	IGP	INDY	DET	ROA	LAG	MOH	IOW		TOR	GTW	POR	MIL		NSS	Pts
1	(United States) Chevrolet	1	4	1	2	1	5	1	3	1	1	1	7	1	1	1	2	2	1475
1	(United States) Chevrolet	2	6	2	6	2	6	2	4	3	2	3	8	2	2	2	4	4	1475
1	(United States) Chevrolet	86^{PW}	60	96^{PW}	68	188^{FPW}	58	95^{W}	67	90^{W}	95^{W}	91^{PW}	50	96^{PW}	96^{PW}	95^{W}	72	72	1475
2	(Japan) Honda	3	1	3	1	3	1	4	1	2	4	2	1	3	3	5	1	1	1343
2	(Japan) Honda	4	2	4	3	5	2	5	2	4	7	4	2	4	4	6	3	3	1343
2	(Japan) Honda	67	96^{PW}	67	91^{PW}	100	96^{PW}	63^{P}	96^{PW}	73^{P}	59^{P}	72	96^{PW}	67	67	58	85	90^{W}	1343

== See also ==
- 2024 Indy NXT
- 2024 USF Pro 2000 Championship
- 2024 USF2000 Championship
- 2024 USF Juniors
