= 2024 Bommarito Automotive Group 500 =

Indycar race held in Madison, Illinois

(United States) 2024 Bommarito Automotive Group 500
Race details
13th round of the 2024 IndyCar season
← Previous race	Next race →
- Layout of the World Wide Technology Raceway
- Date: August 17, 2024
- Official name: Bommarito Automotive Group 500
- Location: World Wide Technology Raceway, Madison, Illinois
- Course: Permanent racing facility 1.25 mi / 2.01 km
- Distance: 260 laps 325 mi / 523 km

Pole position
- Driver: (New Zealand) Scott McLaughlin (Team Penske)
- Time: 00:50.0079 (2 lap time)

Fastest lap
- Driver: (United States) Josef Newgarden (Team Penske)
- Time: 00.25:5721 (on lap 260 of 260)

Podium
- First: (United States) Josef Newgarden (Team Penske)
- Second: (New Zealand) Scott McLaughlin (Team Penske)
- Third: (Sweden) Linus Lundqvist (Chip Ganassi Racing)

Chronology
Previous	Next
2023	2025

The 2024 Bommarito Automotive Group 500 was the thirteenth round of the 2024 IndyCar season. The race was held on August 17, 2024, in Madison, Illinois at the World Wide Technology Raceway. The race took the scheduled 260 laps to complete.

== Practice ==
=== Practice 1 ===
Top Practice Speeds
Pos	No.	Driver	Team	Engine	Lap Time
1	66	(United States) David Malukas	Meyer Shank Racing	Honda	00:25.1635
2	26	(United States) Colton Herta	Andretti Global with Curb-Agajanian	Honda	00:25.2226
3	3	(New Zealand) Scott McLaughlin	Team Penske	Honda	00:25.2894

=== Final Practice ===
Top Practice Speeds
Pos	No.	Driver	Team	Engine	Lap Time
1	5	(Mexico) Pato O'Ward	Arrow McLaren	Chevrolet	00:25.7572
2	28	(Sweden) Marcus Ericsson	Andretti Global	Honda	00:25.8337
3	26	(United States) Colton Herta	Andretti Global with Curb-Agajanian	Honda	00:25.9070

== Qualifying ==
=== Qualifying classification ===
Pos	No.	Driver	Team	Engine	Time		Final grid
Pos	No.	Driver	Team	Engine	Laps		Final grid
Pos	No.	Driver	Team	Engine	Lap 1	Lap 2	Final grid
1	3	(New Zealand) Scott McLaughlin	Team Penske	Honda	25.0055	25.0024	1
2	60	(Sweden) Felix Rosenqvist	Meyer Shank Racing	Honda	24.9961	25.0607	11
3	66	(United States) David Malukas	Andretti Autosport	Honda	25.0587	25.0798	2

== Race ==
The race started at 5:00 PM CDT on August 17, 2024.

=== Race classification ===
Pos	No.	Driver	Team	Engine	Laps	Total Time	Pit Stops	Grid	Laps Led	Pts.
1	2	(United States) Josef Newgarden W	Team Penske	Chevrolet	260	02:22:28.2772	4	3	17	51
2	3	(New Zealand) Scott McLaughlin	Team Penske	Chevrolet	260	02:22:30.0032	5	1	67	42
3	8	(Sweden) Linus Lundqvist R	Chip Ganassi Racing	Honda	260	02:22:32.0647	5	18	1	36
4	10	(Spain) Alex Palou	Chip Ganassi Racing	Honda	260	02:22:34.3288	4	16	0	32
5	26	(United States) Colton Herta	Andretti Global	Honda	260	02:22:34.5418	4	25	0	30
6	60	(Sweden) Felix Rosenqvist	Meyer Shank Racing	Honda	259	+ 1 Lap	4	11	0	28
7	6	(United States) Nolan Siegel R	Arrow McLaren	Chevrolet	259	+ 1 Lap	5	20	8	27
8	11	(New Zealand) Marcus Armstrong	Chip Ganassi Racing	Honda	259	+ 1 Lap	4	10	0	24
9	41	(United States) Sting Ray Robb	A. J. Foyt Enterprises	Chevrolet	259	+ 1 Lap	4	24	8	23
10	21	(Netherlands) Rinus VeeKay	Ed Carpenter Racing	Chevrolet	259	+ 1 Lap	4	12	0	20
11	9	(New Zealand) Scott Dixon	Chip Ganassi Racing	Honda	258	+ 2 Laps	5	19	5	20
12	14	(United States) Santino Ferrucci	A. J. Foyt Enterprises	Chevrolet	258	+ 2 Laps	5	17	0	18
13	78	(United States) Conor Daly	Juncos Hollinger Racing	Chevrolet	258	+ 2 Laps	4	9	0	17
14	30	(Brazil) Pietro Fittipaldi	Rahal Letterman Lanigan Racing	Honda	258	+ 2 Laps	5	15	0	16
15	45	(Denmark) Christian Lundgaard	Rahal Letterman Lanigan Racing	Honda	257	+ 3 Laps	5	23	0	15
16	77	(France) Romain Grosjean	Juncos Hollinger Racing	Chevrolet	257	+ 3 Laps	5	6	0	14
17	20	(United States) Ed Carpenter	Ed Carpenter Racing	Chevrolet	252	+ 8 Laps	9	21	0	13
18	12	(Australia) Will Power	Team Penske	Chevrolet	250	Contact	4	4	117	15
19	7	(United States) Alexander Rossi	Arrow McLaren	Chevrolet	250	Contact	4	13	8	12
20	18	(United Kingdom) Jack Harvey	Dale Coyne Racing	Honda	249	Contact	4	26	0	10
21	66	(United States) David Malukas	Meyer Shank Racing	Honda	238	Contact	4	2	11	10
22	27	(United States) Kyle Kirkwood	Andretti Global	Honda	207	Contact	4	5	0	8
23	15	(United States) Graham Rahal	Rahal Letterman Lanigan Racing	Honda	161	Mechanical	2	14	5	8
24	28	(Sweden) Marcus Ericsson	Andretti Global	Honda	151	Mechanical	2	7	13	7
25	4	(Cayman Islands) Kyffin Simpson R	Chip Ganassi Racing	Honda	84	Contact	1	22	0	5
26	5	(Mexico) Pato O'Ward	Arrow McLaren	Chevrolet	42	Mechanical	0	8	0	5
27	51	(United Kingdom) Katherine Legge	Dale Coyne Racing	Honda	7	Contact	0	27	0	5
Fastest lap: (United States) Josef Newgarden (Team Penske) – 25:5721 (lap 260)
