= 2024 Hy-Vee IndyCar Race Weekend =

Indycar race held in Newton, Iowa

(United States) 2024 Hy-Vee IndyCar Race Weekend
Race details
10th and 11th round of the 2024 IndyCar season
← Previous race	Next race →
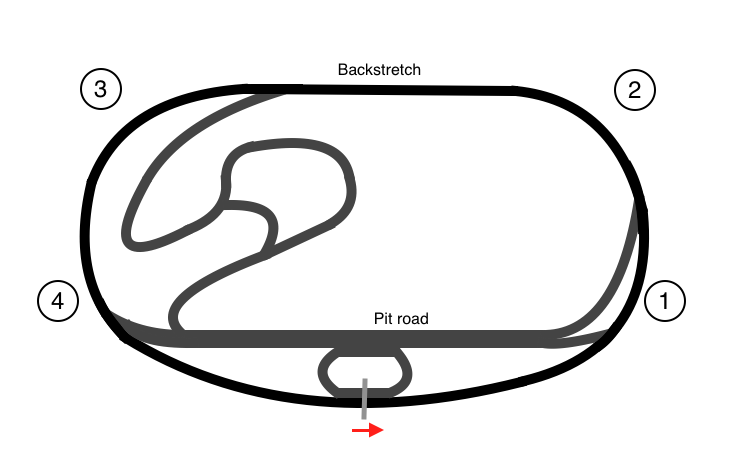
- Layout of the Iowa Speedway circuit
- Date: July 13–14, 2024
- Official name: Hy-Vee IndyCar Race Weekend
- Location: Iowa Speedway
- Course: Permanent racing facility 0.894 mi / 1.439 km
- Distance: Both 250 laps 223.5 mi / 359.688 km
Race 1

Pole position
- Driver: (United States) Colton Herta (Andretti Global with Curb Agajanian)
- Time: 00:17.1506

Fastest lap
- Driver: (United States) Josef Newgarden (Team Penske)
- Time: 00:18.0687 (on lap 246 of 250)

Podium
- First: (New Zealand) Scott McLaughlin (Team Penske)
- Second: (Mexico) Pato O'Ward (Arrow McLaren)
- Third: (United States) Josef Newgarden (Team Penske)
Race 2

Pole position
- Driver: (New Zealand) Scott McLaughlin (Team Penske)
- Time: 00:17.0966

Fastest lap
- Driver: (United States) Josef Newgarden (Team Penske)
- Time: 00:18.0190 (on lap 240 of 250)

Podium
- First: (Australia) Will Power (Team Penske)
- Second: (Spain) Álex Palou (Chip Ganassi Racing)
- Third: (New Zealand) Scott McLaughlin (Team Penske)

Chronology
Previous	Next
2023	2025

The 2024 Hy-Vee IndyCar Race Weekend was a pair of IndyCar motor races held on July 13, 2024, and July 14, 2024, at Iowa Speedway in Newton, Iowa. They were the 10th and 11th rounds of the 2024 IndyCar season. The race weekend has been held since 2007, except for a brief hiatus in 2021 after a change of focus by the owner of the track.

The first race (officially the Hy-Vee Homefront 250 presented by Instacart) was held on July 13, 2024, with the second (officially the Hy-Vee One Step 250 presented by Gatorade) was held on July 14, 2024. Each race was contested of 250 laps. The first race was won by Scott McLaughlin and the second race was won by Will Power. The first race had an opening lap crash that involved David Malukas, Romain Grosjean, Agustin Canapino, and Christian Lundgaard. On the final lap of the second race, Sting Ray Robb flipped upside down by Alexander Rossi, who ran out of fuel, and also collected Kyle Kirkwood and Ed Carpenter.

== Race 1 - Hy-Vee Homefront 250 presented by Instacart ==
=== Practice ===
Top Practice Speeds
Pos	No.	Driver	Team	Engine	Lap Time
1	3	(New Zealand) Scott McLaughlin	Team Penske	Chevrolet	00:17.3134
2	10	(Spain) Álex Palou	Chip Ganassi Racing	Honda	00:17.3465
3	5	(Mexico) Pato O'Ward	Chip Ganassi Racing	Honda	00:17.4767

=== Qualifying classification ===
Pos	No.	Driver	Team	Engine	Lap Time	Final grid							
Pos	No.	Driver	Team	Engine	Lap Time	Final grid	1	26	(United States) Colton Herta	Andretti Global with Curb-Agajanian	Honda	17.1506	1
Pos	No.	Driver	Team	Engine	Lap Time	Final grid	2	3	(New Zealand) Scott McLaughlin	Team Penske	Chevrolet	17.1624	2
3	10	(Spain) Álex Palou	Chip Ganassi Racing	Honda	17.2253	3							
Ofiicial Results

=== Race ===
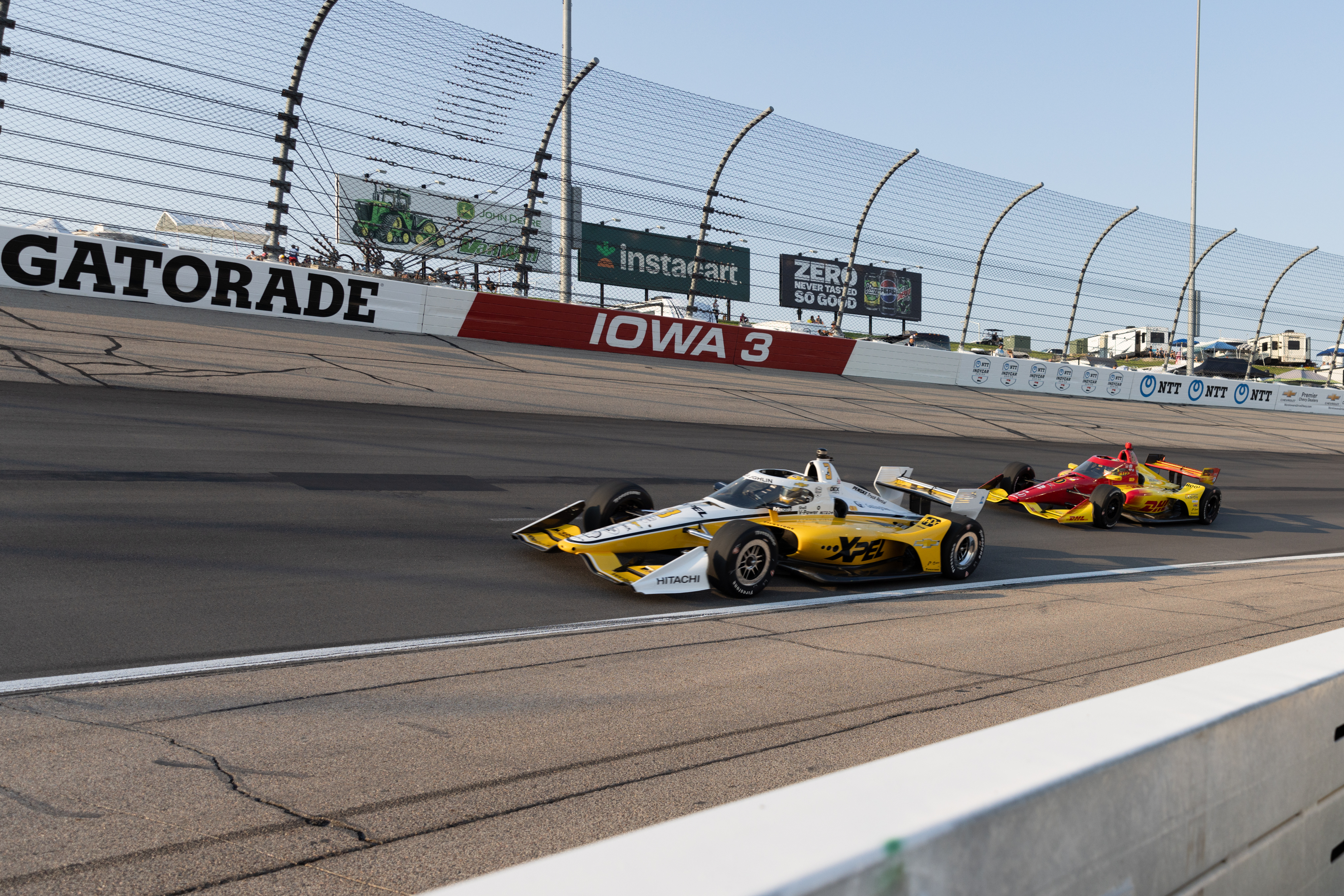
Scott McLaughlin and Álex Palou at the 2024 Hy-Vee Homefront 250

The race was held on July 13, 2024. Scott McLaughlin of Team Penske won the race, combining with polesitter Colton Herta of Andretti Global to lead all 250 laps.

==== Race classification ====
Pos	No.	Driver	Team	Engine	Laps	Time/Retired	Pit Stops	Grid	Laps Led	Pts.
1	3	(New Zealand) Scott McLaughlin W	Team Penske	Chevrolet	250	01:44:41.1172	2	2	164	53
2	5	(Mexico) Pato O'Ward W	Arrow McLaren	Chevrolet	250	01:44:41.5986	2	6	-	40
3	2	(United States) Josef Newgarden W	Team Penske	Chevrolet	250	01:44:42.6346	2	22	-	35
4	9	(New Zealand) Scott Dixon	Chip Ganassi Racing	Honda	250	1:44:46.1213	2	5	-	32
5	21	(Netherlands) Rinus Veekay	Ed Carpenter Racing	Chevrolet	250	1:44:47.6828	2	13	-	30
6	14	(United States) Santino Ferrucci	A.J. Foyt Enterprises	Chevrolet	250	1:44:48.5747	2	8	-	28
7	27	(United States) Kyle Kirkwood	Andretti Global	Honda	250	1:44:49.5372	2	19	-	26
8	7	(United States) Alexander Rossi	Arrow McLaren	Chevrolet	250	1:44:50.4597	2	7	-	24
9	28	(Sweden) Marcus Ericsson	Andretti Global	Honda	250	1:44:51.4942	2	10	-	22
10	11	(New Zealand) Marcus Armstrong	Chip Ganassi Racing	Honda	250	1:44:52.5178	2	9	-	20
11	26	(United States) Colton Herta	Andretti Global with Curb-Agajanian	Honda	250	1:44:52.9286	2	1	86	21
12	6	(United States) Nolan Siegel R	Arrow McLaren	Chevrolet	250	1:44:53.2451	2	15	-	18
13	60	(Sweden) Felix Rosenqvist	Meyer Shank Racing	Honda	250	1:44:53.5823	2	11	-	17
14	4	(Cayman Islands) Kyffin Simpson R	Chip Ganassi Racing	Honda	250	1:44:54.6220	2	27	-	16
15	41	(United States) Sting Ray Robb	A.J. Foyt Enterprises	Chevrolet	250	1:44:55.1414	2	24	-	15
16	15	(United States) Graham Rahal	Rahal Letterman Lanigan Racing	Honda	249	1:44:55.6604	2	21	-	14
17	51	(United Kingdom) Katherine Legge	Dale Coyne Racing	Honda	249	1:44:59.6138	2	26	-	13
18	12	(Australia) Will Power	Team Penske	Chevrolet	241	1:44:58.6088	4	4	-	12
19	30	(Brazil) Pietro Fittipaldi	Rahal Letterman Lanigan Racing	Honda	228	Contact	2	17	-	11
20	20	(United States) Ed Carpenter	Ed Carpenter Racing	Chevrolet	228	Contact	3	25	-	10
21	8	(Sweden) Linus Lundqvist R	Chip Ganassi Racing	Honda	209	Mechanical	2	12	-	9
22	45	(Denmark) Christian Lundgaard	Rahal Letterman Lanigan Racing	Honda	178	Contact	3	23	-	8
23	10	(Spain) Álex Palou	Chip Ganassi Racing	Honda	175	Contact	1	3	-	7
24	77	(France) Romain Grosjean	Juncos Hollinger Racing	Chevrolet	48	Contact	1	20	-	6
25	18	(United Kingdom) Jack Harvey	Dale Coyne Racing	Honda	28	Retired	-	18	-	5
26	66	(United States) David Malukas	Meyer Shank Racing	Honda	0	Contact	-	14	-	5
27	78	(Argentina) Agustín Canapino	Juncos Hollinger Racing	Chevrolet	0	Contact	-	16	-	5
Fastest lap: (United States) Josef Newgarden (Team Penske) – 18.0687 (lap 246)
Official Results

== Race 2 - Hy-Vee One Step 250 presented by Gatorade ==
=== Qualifying classification ===
Pos	No.	Driver	Team	Engine	Lap Time	Final grid							
Pos	No.	Driver	Team	Engine	Lap Time	Final grid	1	3	(New Zealand) Scott McLaughlin	Team Penske	Chevrolet	17.0966	1
Pos	No.	Driver	Team	Engine	Lap Time	Final grid	2	10	(Spain) Álex Palou	Chip Ganassi Racing	Honda	17.1582	2
3	9	(New Zealand) Scott Dixon	Chip Ganassi Racing	Honda	17.1958	3							
Ofiicial Results

=== Race ===
The race was held on July 14, 2024. Will Power won the race, giving Team Penske its fourth consecutive win at Iowa and ninth overall at the track.

==== Race classification ====
Pos	No.	Driver	Team	Engine	Laps	Time/Retired	Pit Stops	Grid	Laps Led	Pts.
1	12	(Australia) Will Power	Team Penske	Chevrolet	250	01:26:38.7472	2	22	50	51
2	10	(Spain) Álex Palou	Chip Ganassi Racing	Honda	250	01:26:39.1387	2	2	103	43
3	3	(New Zealand) Scott McLaughlin W	Team Penske	Chevrolet	250	01:26:41.1123	2	1	94	37
4	9	(New Zealand) Scott Dixon	Chip Ganassi Racing	Honda	250	1:26:41.2798	2	3	-	32
5	26	(United States) Colton Herta	Andretti Global with Curb-Agajanian	Honda	250	1:26:43.1835	2	4	-	30
6	5	(Mexico) Pato O'Ward W	Arrow McLaren	Chevrolet	250	1:26:46.4261	2	7	-	28
7	2	(United States) Josef Newgarden W	Team Penske	Chevrolet	250	1:26:43.6064	2	14	-	26
8	15	(United States) Graham Rahal	Rahal Letterman Lanigan Racing	Honda	250	1:26:56.8028	2	8	-	24
9	21	(Netherlands) Rinus Veekay	Ed Carpenter Racing	Chevrolet	250	1:26:57.5120	2	15	-	22
10	77	(France) Romain Grosjean	Juncos Hollinger Racing	Chevrolet	250	1:26:57.2280	2	16	-	20
11	14	(United States) Santino Ferrucci	A.J. Foyt Enterprises	Chevrolet	250	1:26:59.5783	2	19	-	19
12	8	(Sweden) Linus Lundqvist R	Chip Ganassi Racing	Honda	250	1:27:03.7707	3	13	3	19
13	66	(United States) David Malukas	Meyer Shank Racing	Honda	250	1:27:05.2245	2	9	-	17
14	6	(United States) Nolan Siegel R	Arrow McLaren	Chevrolet	250	1:27:06.8768	2	11	-	16
15	7	(United States) Alexander Rossi	Arrow McLaren	Chevrolet	249	Contact	2	6	-	15
16	27	(United States) Kyle Kirkwood	Andretti Global	Honda	249	Contact	2	12	-	14
17	45	(Denmark) Christian Lundgaard	Rahal Letterman Lanigan Racing	Honda	249	1:26:40.0377	2	18	-	13
18	4	(Cayman Islands) Kyffin Simpson R	Chip Ganassi Racing	Honda	249	1:26:42.3091	2	23	-	12
19	11	(New Zealand) Marcus Armstrong	Chip Ganassi Racing	Honda	249	1:27:02.9722	2	25	-	11
20	30	(Brazil) Pietro Fittipaldi	Rahal Letterman Lanigan Racing	Honda	249	1:27:04.6798	2	17	-	10
21	41	(United States) Sting Ray Robb	A.J. Foyt Enterprises	Chevrolet	248	Contact	2	20	-	9
22	20	(United States) Ed Carpenter	Ed Carpenter Racing	Chevrolet	248	Contact	2	26	-	8
23	28	(Sweden) Marcus Ericsson	Andretti Global	Honda	248	1:26:40.6183	2	21	-	7
24	51	(United Kingdom) Katherine Legge	Dale Coyne Racing	Honda	248	1:26:42.7888	2	24	-	6
25	78	(Argentina) Agustín Canapino	Juncos Hollinger Racing	Chevrolet	221	Mechanical	3	10	-	5
26	60	(Sweden) Felix Rosenqvist	Meyer Shank Racing	Honda	184	Mechanical	1	5	-	5
27	18	(United States) Conor Daly	Dale Coyne Racing	Honda	140	Mechanical	1	27	-	5
Fastest lap: (United States) Josef Newgarden (Team Penske) – 18.0190 (lap 240)
Official Results

== Media ==
=== Television ===
Both the Saturday and Sunday races were scheduled to air on NBC and Peacock. However, due to coverage of the attempted assassination of Donald Trump, the Saturday race was moved to CNBC; Peacock still streamed the race. This is the last Iowa double-header on NBC, as the 2025 edition will air on Fox as part of their new IndyCar deal.
