= 2024 Honda Indy 200 =

Indycar race held in Lexington, Ohio

(United States) 2024 Honda Indy 200
Race details
9th round of the 2024 IndyCar season
← Previous race	Next race →
- Layout of the Mid-Ohio Sports Car Course circuit
- Date: July 7, 2024
- Official name: Honda Indy 200 at Mid-Ohio
- Location: Mid-Ohio Sports Car Course, Lexington, Ohio
- Course: Permanent road course 2.258 mi / 3.634 km
- Distance: 80 laps 180.64 mi / 290.71 km

Pole position
- Driver: (Spain) Alex Palou (Chip Ganassi Racing)
- Time: 01:05.3511

Fastest lap
- Driver: (United States) Josef Newgarden (Team Penske)
- Time: 1:06.5386 (on lap 72 of 80)

Podium
- First: (Mexico) Pato O'Ward (Arrow McLaren)
- Second: (Spain) Álex Palou (Chip Ganassi Racing)
- Third: (New Zealand) Scott McLaughlin (Team Penske)

Chronology
Previous	Next
2023	2025

The 2024 Honda Indy 200 at Mid-Ohio was the ninth round of the 2024 IndyCar season. The race was held on Sunday, July 7, 2024, in Lexington, Ohio at the Mid-Ohio Sports Car Course. Pato O'Ward scored his second win of the 2024 season by holding off polesitter Álex Palou in the final laps. Scott McLaughlin rounded out the podium in third.

== Practice ==
=== Practice 1 ===
Top Practice Speeds
Pos	No.	Driver	Team	Engine	Lap Time
1	10	(Spain) Álex Palou	Chip Ganassi Racing	Honda	01:07.0650
2	7	(United States) Alexander Rossi	Arrow McLaren	Chevrolet	01:07.5093
3	11	(New Zealand) Marcus Armstrong	Chip Ganassi Racing	Honda	01:07.5442

=== Practice 2 ===
Top Practice Speeds
Pos	No.	Driver	Team	Engine	Lap Time
1	5	(Mexico) Pato O'Ward	Arrow McLaren	Chevrolet	01:05.9862
2	15	(United States) Graham Rahal	Rahal Letterman Lanigan Racing	Honda	01:06.0439
3	26	(United States) Colton Herta	Andretti Global with Curb-Agajanian	Honda	01:06.1639

== Qualifying ==
=== Qualifying classification ===
Pos	No.	Driver	Team	Engine	Final grid						
Pos	No.	Driver	Team	Engine	Final grid	1	10	(Spain) Álex Palou	Chip Ganassi Racing	Honda	1
Pos	No.	Driver	Team	Engine	Final grid	2	5	(Mexico) Pato O'Ward	Arrow McLaren	Chevrolet	1
3	66	(United States) David Malukas	Meyer Shank Racing	Honda	2						

Notes

- **Bold text** indicates fastest time set in session.

== Warmup ==
Top Practice Speeds
Pos	No.	Driver	Team	Engine	Lap Time
1	9	(New Zealand) Scott Dixon	Chip Ganassi Racing	Honda	01:06.2555
2	10	(Spain) Álex Palou	Chip Ganassi Racing	Honda	01:06.4005
3	26	(United States) Colton Herta	Andretti Global with Curb-Agajanian	Honda	01:06.5162

== Race ==
This race saw the introduction of IndyCar's new hybrid power units, allowing up to 120 more horsepower, for a total of over 800.

Pato O'Ward took his second win of the season over points leader Alex Palou.

=== Race results ===
Pos	No.	Driver	Team	Engine	Laps	Time/Retired	Pit Stops	Grid	Laps Led	Pts.
1	5	(Mexico) Pato O'Ward	Arrow McLaren	Chevrolet	80	01:33:22.6191	2	2	24	51
2	10	(Spain) Álex Palou	Chip Ganassi Racing	Honda	80	01:33:23.1184	2	1	53	44
3	3	(New Zealand) Scott McLaughlin	Team Penske	Chevrolet	80	01:33:38.7749	2	6	3	36
4	26	(United States) Colton Herta	Andretti Global with Curb-Agajanian	Honda	80	01:33:47.4916	2	4	0	32
5	28	(Sweden) Marcus Ericsson	Andretti Global	Honda	80	01:33:54.3000	2	5	0	30
6	7	(United States) Alexander Rossi	Arrow McLaren	Chevrolet	80	01:33:54.8634	2	7	0	28
7	45	(Denmark) Christian Lundgaard	Rahal Letterman Lanigan Racing	Honda	80	01:33:55.1905	2	9	0	26
8	27	(United States) Kyle Kirkwood	Andretti Global	Honda	80	01:33:57.8409	2	14	0	24
9	20	(Denmark) Christian Rasmussen **R**	Ed Carpenter Racing	Chevrolet	80	01:34:02.9373	2	8	0	22
10	14	(United States) Santino Ferrucci	A.J. Foyt Enterprises	Chevrolet	80	01:34:09.5275	2	21	0	20
11	12	(Australia) Will Power	Team Penske	Chevrolet	80	01:34:11.2737	2	15	0	19
12	66	(United States) David Malukas	Meyer Shank Racing	Honda	80	01:34:12.0097	2	3	0	18
13	51	(United Kingdom) Toby Sowery **R**	Dale Coyne Racing with Rick Ware Racing	Honda	80	01:34:12.5057	2	24	0	17
14	60	(Sweden) Felix Rosenqvist	Meyer Shank Racing	Honda	80	01:34:14.4353	3	19	0	16
15	8	(Sweden) Linus Lundqvist **R**	Chip Ganassi Racing	Honda	80	01:34:16.0985	3	10	0	15
16	41	(United States) Sting Ray Robb	A.J. Foyt Enterprises	Chevrolet	80	01:34:17.3604	2	25	0	14
17	11	(New Zealand) Marcus Armstrong	Chip Ganassi Racing	Honda	80	01:34:18.4590	3	11	0	13
18	15	(United States) Graham Rahal	Rahal Letterman Lanigan Racing	Honda	80	01:34:21.4872	3	18	0	12
19	21	(Netherlands) Rinus Veekay	Ed Carpenter Racing	Chevrolet	80	01:34:23.0741	3	20	0	11
20	6	(United States) Nolan Siegel **R**	Arrow McLaren	Chevrolet	80	01:34:28.4782	3	16	0	10
21	4	(Cayman Islands) Kyffin Simpson **R**	Chip Ganassi Racing	Honda	80	01:34:29.6604	3	23	0	9
22	78	(Argentina) Agustín Canapino	Juncos Hollinger Racing	Chevrolet	79	+1 Lap	2	22	0	8
23	77	(France) Romain Grosjean	Juncos Hollinger Racing	Chevrolet	79	+1 Lap	2	12	0	7
24	30	(Brazil) Pietro Fittipaldi	Rahal Letterman Lanigan Racing	Honda	79	+1 Lap	3	27	0	6
25	2	(United States) Josef Newgarden	Team Penske	Chevrolet	79	+1 Lap	3	17	0	5
26	18	(United Kingdom) Jack Harvey	Dale Coyne Racing	Honda	79	+1 Lap	2	26	0	5
27	9	(New Zealand) Scott Dixon	Chip Ganassi Racing	Honda	40	Mechanical	1	13	0	5
Fastest lap: (United States) Josef Newgarden (Team Penske) – 01:06.5386 (lap 72)

Previous race: 2024 Firestone Grand Prix of Monterey	IndyCar Series; 2024 season	Next race: 2024 Hy-Vee IndyCar Race Weekend
Previous race: 2023 Honda Indy 200	Honda Indy 200 at Mid-Ohio	Next race: 2025 Honda Indy 200
