= 2024 Sonsio Grand Prix =

Indycar race held in Speedway, Indiana

(United States) 2024 Sonsio Grand Prix
Race details
4th round of the 2024 IndyCar season
← Previous race	Next race →
- Layout of the Indianapolis Motor Speedway Road Course
- Date: May 11, 2024
- Official name: Sonsio Grand Prix
- Location: Indianapolis Motor Speedway, Speedway, Indiana
- Course: Permanent road course 2.439 mi / 3.925 km
- Distance: 85 laps 207.315 mi / 333.641 km

Pole position
- Driver: (Spain) Álex Palou (Chip Ganassi Racing)
- Time: 01:09.0004

Fastest lap
- Driver: (Spain) Álex Palou (Chip Ganassi Racing)
- Time: 01:11.1111 (on lap 72 of 85)

Podium
- First: (Spain) Álex Palou (Chip Ganassi Racing)
- Second: (Australia) Will Power (Team Penske)
- Third: (Denmark) Christian Lundgaard (Rahal Letterman Lanigan Racing)

Chronology
Previous	Next
August 2023	2025

The 2024 Sonsio Grand Prix was the fourth round of the 2024 IndyCar season. The race was held on May 11, 2024, in Speedway, Indiana at the Indianapolis Motor Speedway Road Course. The race consisted of 85 laps and was won by Álex Palou.

== Entry list ==
Key	Meaning
R	Rookie
W	Past winner

No.	Driver	Team	Engine
2	(United States) Josef Newgarden W	Team Penske	Chevrolet
3	(New Zealand) Scott McLaughlin	Team Penske	Chevrolet
4	(Cayman Islands) Kyffin Simpson R	Chip Ganassi Racing	Honda
5	(Mexico) Pato O'Ward	Arrow McLaren	Chevrolet
6	(France) Théo Pourchaire R	Arrow McLaren	Chevrolet
7	(United States) Alexander Rossi W	Arrow McLaren	Chevrolet
8	(Sweden) Linus Lundqvist R	Chip Ganassi Racing	Honda
9	(New Zealand) Scott Dixon W	Chip Ganassi Racing	Honda
10	(Spain) Álex Palou W	Chip Ganassi Racing	Honda
11	(New Zealand) Marcus Armstrong	Chip Ganassi Racing	Honda
12	(Australia) Will Power W	Team Penske	Chevrolet
14	(United States) Santino Ferrucci	A.J. Foyt Enterprises	Chevrolet
15	(United States) Graham Rahal	Rahal Letterman Lanigan Racing	Honda
18	(United Kingdom) Jack Harvey	Dale Coyne Racing	Honda
20	(Denmark) Christian Rasmussen R	Ed Carpenter Racing	Chevrolet
21	(Netherlands) Rinus VeeKay W	Ed Carpenter Racing	Chevrolet
26	(United States) Colton Herta W	Andretti Global with Curb-Agajanian	Honda
27	(United States) Kyle Kirkwood	Andretti Global	Honda
28	(Sweden) Marcus Ericsson	Andretti Global	Honda
30	(Brazil) Pietro Fittipaldi	Rahal Letterman Lanigan Racing	Honda
41	(United States) Sting Ray Robb	A.J. Foyt Enterprises	Chevrolet
45	(Denmark) Christian Lundgaard	Rahal Letterman Lanigan Racing	Honda
51	(Italy) Luca Ghiotto R	Dale Coyne Racing with Rick Ware Racing	Honda
60	(Sweden) Felix Rosenqvist	Meyer Shank Racing	Honda
66	(United Kingdom) Tom Blomqvist R	Meyer Shank Racing	Honda
77	(France) Romain Grosjean	Juncos Hollinger Racing	Chevrolet
78	(Argentina) Agustín Canapino	Juncos Hollinger Racing	Chevrolet

== Practice ==
=== Practice 1 ===
Top Practice Speeds
Pos	No.	Driver	Team	Engine	Lap Time
1	26	(United States) Colton Herta W	Andretti Global with Curb-Agajanian	Honda	109.2863
2	78	(Argentina) Agustín Canapino	Juncos Hollinger Racing	Chevrolet	01:09.3713
3	12	(Australia) Will Power W	Team Penske	Chevrolet	01:09.3930

=== Practice 2 ===
Top Practice Speeds
Pos	No.	Driver	Team	Engine	Lap Time
1	45	(Denmark) Christian Lundgaard	Rahal Letterman Lanigan Racing	Honda	01:09.5588
2	12	(Australia) Will Power W	Team Penske	Chevrolet	01:09.6899
3	9	(New Zealand) Scott Dixon W	Chip Ganassi Racing	Honda	109.8565

== Qualifying ==
=== Qualifying classification ===
Pos	No.	Driver	Team	Engine	Time				Final grid
Pos	No.	Driver	Team	Engine	Round 1		Round 2	Round 3	Final grid
Pos	No.	Driver	Team	Engine	Group 1	Group 2	Round 2	Round 3	Final grid
1	10	(Spain) Álex Palou W	Chip Ganassi Racing	Honda	N/A	01:09.0414	01:08.9057	01:09.0004	1
2	45	(Denmark) Christian Lundgaard	Rahal Letterman Lanigan Racing	Honda	N/A	01:09.0127	01:08.8388	01:09.0921	2
3	12	(Australia) Will Power W	Team Penske	Chevrolet	01:08.7890	N/A	01:08.8194	01:09.1636	3
4	2	(United States) Josef Newgarden W	Team Penske	Chevrolet	01:08.9997	N/A	01:09.0319	01:09.2528	4
5	5	(Mexico) Pato O'Ward	Arrow McLaren	Chevrolet	01:09.0167	N/A	01:08.9928	01:09.3320	5
6	9	(New Zealand) Scott Dixon W	Chip Ganassi Racing	Honda	N/A	01:09.1530	01:09.0616	01:09.5270	6
7	7	(United States) Alexander Rossi W	Arrow McLaren	Chevrolet	01:09.0900	N/A	01:09.0801	N/A	7
8	11	(New Zealand) Marcus Armstrong	Chip Ganassi Racing	Honda	N/A	01:09.0377	01:09.1175	N/A	8
9	15	(United States) Graham Rahal	Rahal Letterman Lanigan Racing	Honda	N/A	01:09.0412	01:09.1491	N/A	9
10	60	(Sweden) Felix Rosenqvist	Meyer Shank Racing	Honda	N/A	01:08.9912	01:09.2923	N/A	10
11	30	(Brazil) Pietro Fittipaldi	Rahal Letterman Lanigan Racing	Honda	01:09.1330	N/A	01:09.3698	N/A	11
12	21	(Netherlands) Rinus VeeKay W	Ed Carpenter Racing	Chevrolet	01:08.9462	N/A	01:09.3915	N/A	12
13	3	(New Zealand) Scott McLaughlin	Team Penske	Chevrolet	01:09.1378	N/A	N/A	N/A	13
14	27	(United States) Kyle Kirkwood	Andretti Global	Honda	N/A	01:09.1712	N/A	N/A	14
15	78	(Argentina) Agustín Canapino	Juncos Hollinger Racing	Chevrolet	01:09.2578	N/A	N/A	N/A	15
16	14	(United States) Santino Ferrucci	A.J. Foyt Enterprises	Chevrolet	N/A	01:09.2637	N/A	N/A	16
17	18	(United Kingdom) Jack Harvey	Dale Coyne Racing	Honda	01:09.3524	N/A	N/A	N/A	17
18	6	(France) Théo Pourchaire R	Arrow McLaren	Chevrolet	N/A	01:09.3816	N/A	N/A	18
19	8	(Sweden) Linus Lundqvist R	Chip Ganassi Racing	Honda	01:09.3385	N/A	N/A	N/A	19
20	20	(Denmark) Christian Rasmussen R	Ed Carpenter Racing	Chevrolet	N/A	01:09.4190	N/A	N/A	20
21	28	(Sweden) Marcus Ericsson	Andretti Global	Honda	01:09.3936	N/A	N/A	N/A	21
22	51	(Italy) Luca Ghiotto R	Dale Coyne Racing with Rick Ware Racing	Honda	N/A	01:09.4519	N/A	N/A	22
23	77	(France) Romain Grosjean	Juncos Hollinger Racing	Chevrolet	01:09.4283	N/A	N/A	N/A	23
24	26	(United States) Colton Herta W	Andretti Global with Curb-Agajanian	Honda	N/A	01:09.5391	N/A	N/A	24
25	4	(Cayman Islands) Kyffin Simpson R	Chip Ganassi Racing	Honda	01:09.5613	N/A	N/A	N/A	25
26	66	(United Kingdom) Tom Blomqvist R	Meyer Shank Racing	Honda	N/A	01:09.6264	N/A	N/A	26
27	41	(United States) Sting Ray Robb	A.J. Foyt Enterprises	Chevrolet	01:10.0399	N/A	N/A	N/A	27

== Warmup ==
Top Practice Speeds
Pos	No.	Driver	Team	Engine	Lap Time
1	11	(New Zealand) Marcus Armstrong	Chip Ganassi Racing	Honda	01:09.8485
2	26	(United States) Colton Herta W	Andretti Global with Curb-Agajanian	Honda	01:10.2314
3	21	(Netherlands) Rinus VeeKay W	Ed Carpenter Racing	Chevrolet	01:10.3889

== Race ==
The race started at 3:30 PM ET on May 11, 2024.

=== Race classification ===
Pos	No.	Driver	Team	Engine	Laps	Time/Retired	Pit Stops	Grid	Laps Led	Pts.
1	10	(Spain) Álex Palou W	Chip Ganassi Racing	Honda	85	1:45:27.2320	3	1	39	54
2	12	(Australia) Will Power W	Team Penske	Chevrolet	85	+6.6106	3	3	0	40
3	45	(Denmark) Christian Lundgaard	Rahal Letterman Lanigan Racing	Honda	85	+8.0900	3	2	35	36
4	9	(New Zealand) Scott Dixon W	Chip Ganassi Racing	Honda	85	+13.4262	3	6	1	33
5	11	(New Zealand) Marcus Armstrong	Chip Ganassi Racing	Honda	85	+13.8978	3	8	3	31
6	3	(New Zealand) Scott McLaughlin	Team Penske	Chevrolet	85	+14.2746	3	13	2	29
7	26	(United States) Colton Herta W	Andretti Global with Curb-Agajanian	Honda	85	+18.8554	3	24		26
8	7	(United States) Alexander Rossi W	Arrow McLaren	Chevrolet	85	+20.1638	3	7	1	25
9	15	(United States) Graham Rahal	Rahal Letterman Lanigan Racing	Honda	85	+22.1556	3	9	2	23
10	60	(Sweden) Felix Rosenqvist	Meyer Shank Racing	Honda	85	+26.3424	3	10		20
11	27	(United States) Kyle Kirkwood	Andretti Global	Honda	85	+27.4572	3	14		19
12	77	(France) Romain Grosjean	Juncos Hollinger Racing	Chevrolet	85	+29.3108	3	23		18
13	5	(Mexico) Pato O'Ward	Arrow McLaren	Chevrolet	85	+31.2388	3	5		17
14	30	(Brazil) Pietro Fittipaldi	Rahal Letterman Lanigan Racing	Honda	85	+31.8872	3	11	2	17
15	4	(Cayman Islands) Kyffin Simpson R	Chip Ganassi Racing	Honda	85	+32.2895	3	25		15
16	28	(Sweden) Marcus Ericsson	Andretti Global	Honda	85	+34.6582	3	21		14
17	2	(United States) Josef Newgarden W	Team Penske	Chevrolet	85	+36.9649	3	4		13
18	18	(United Kingdom) Jack Harvey	Dale Coyne Racing	Honda	85	+38.0124	3	17		12
19	6	(France) Théo Pourchaire R	Arrow McLaren	Chevrolet	85	+38.0679	3	18		11
20	20	(Denmark) Christian Rasmussen R	Ed Carpenter Racing	Chevrolet	85	+39.4219	3	20		10
21	78	(Argentina) Agustín Canapino	Juncos Hollinger Racing	Chevrolet	84	+1 Lap	3	15		9
22	41	(United States) Sting Ray Robb	A.J. Foyt Enterprises	Chevrolet	84	+1 Lap	3	27		8
23	66	(United Kingdom) Tom Blomqvist R	Meyer Shank Racing	Honda	84	+1 Lap	3	26		7
24	8	(Sweden) Linus Lundqvist R	Chip Ganassi Racing	Honda	84	+1 Lap	3	19		6
25	51	(Italy) Luca Ghiotto R	Dale Coyne Racing with Rick Ware Racing	Honda	84	+1 Lap	3	22		5
26	21	(Netherlands) Rinus VeeKay W	Ed Carpenter Racing	Chevrolet	84	+1 Lap	4	12		5
27	14	(United States) Santino Ferrucci	A.J. Foyt Enterprises	Chevrolet	55	Mechanical	2	16		5
Fastest lap: (Spain) Álex Palou (Chip Ganassi Racing) – 01:11.1111 (lap 72)

== Championship standings after the race ==
Drivers' Championship standings

Pos.	Driver	Points
1	(Spain) Álex Palou	152
2	(Australia) Will Power	140 (-12)
3	(United States) Colton Herta	127 (-25)
4	(New Zealand) Scott Dixon	127 (-25)
5	(Sweden) Felix Rosenqvist	107 (-45)

Engine manufacturer standings

Pos.	Manufacturer	Points
1	(United States) Chevrolet	310
2	(Japan) Honda	298

- Note: Only the top five positions are included.

Previous race: 2024 Children's of Alabama Indy Grand Prix	IndyCar Series; 2024 season	Next race: 2024 Indianapolis 500
Previous race: 2023 GMR Grand Prix	Grand Prix of Indianapolis	Next race: 2025 Sonsio Grand Prix
