= Chevrolet Indy V6 =

Overview
- Manufacturer: Chevrolet/Ilmor
- Production: 2012–present

Layout
- Configuration: V6 engine, 90° cylinder angle
- Displacement: 2.2 L (2,199 cc)
- Cylinder bore: 95 mm (3.7 in)
- Piston stroke: 51.7 mm (2 in)
- Cylinder block material: Aluminum alloy
- Cylinder head material: Aluminum alloy
- Valvetrain: 24-valve, DOHC, four-valves per cylinder

Combustion
- Turbocharger: Twin-turbocharged
- Fuel system: Direct-indirect fuel-injection combination
- Management: MES TAG-400i
- Fuel type: E85 Ethanol provided by Sunoco (2012–2018) and Speedway (2019–2022); E100 Renewable Ethanol provided by Shell V-Power Nitro+ (2023–present)
- Oil system: Dry sump

Output
- Power output: 550-735 hp (410-548 kW) @ 10,500-12,200 rpm (depending on variable turbo boost used at track.)
- Torque output: Approx. 302–370 lb⋅ft (409–502 N⋅m) @ 8000 rpm

Dimensions
- Dry weight: 248 lb (112 kg) excluding clutch, ECU, fluids, turbocharger

Chronology
- Predecessor: Chevrolet Indy V8 (2002–2005)

The Chevrolet Indy V6 engine is a 2.2-liter, twin-turbocharged, V6 racing engine, developed and produced by Chevrolet in partnership with Ilmor Engineering for the IndyCar Series. Chevrolet has been a highly successful IndyCar Series engine supplier, scoring 100 IndyCar wins, 35 pole positions, 7 IndyCar Series driver's titles and 7 IndyCar Series manufacturer's titles. On November 12, 2010, Chevrolet confirmed their return to the IndyCar Series 2012 season after 6-year absence. As of 2026, they supply engines to A. J. Foyt Enterprises, Arrow McLaren, Ed Carpenter Racing, Juncos Hollinger Racing, and Team Penske teams.

== Specifications ==
- Engine type: Chevrolet V6 - twin-turbocharged
- Capacity: 2.2 L (134 cu in)
- HP rating (speedway / 1.5-mile oval / road-street course): 550 hp (410 kW) / 625 hp (466 kW) / 735 hp (548 kW)
- Max. RPM/Rev limiter: 12,000 rpm; 12,200 rpm overtake
- Weight: 248 lbs. (112.5 kg)
- Oil system: Dry-sump lubrication
- Turbocharger: Twin - BorgWarner EFR7163
- Turbocharger boost levels (speedway / 1.5-mile oval / road-street course / push-to-pass): 1.3 bar (19 psi) / 1.4 bar (20 psi) / 1.5–1.6 bar (22–23 psi) / 1.65 bar (24 psi)
- Camshafts: Double-overhead camshafts
- Valve actuation: Finger-follower
- Valve springs: Wire-type
- Cylinder head: 4 valves (titanium) per cylinder
- Fuel injection: Astemo/Bosch 6x direct in-cylinder fuel. Astemo/Bosch 6x high pressure port injectors
- Fuel: E85 Ethanol provided by Sunoco (2012–2018) and Speedway (2019–2022), E100 Renewable Ethanol provided by Shell V-Power Nitro+ (2023–present)
- Lubricants: Shell Helix Ultra or Pennzoil Ultra Platinum (Team Penske and rest of teams) and Lucas Oil (Arrow McLaren)
- Block & head material: Aluminum
- Crankshaft: Billet steel
- Con rods: Billet steel
- Pistons: Billet aluminum
- Intake systems: Single plenum - carbon-fiber
- Throttle systems: Electronic throttle control
- Electronic control unit: McLaren Electronics - TAG-400I
- Engine service life: 2,500–2,850 miles
- Gearbox: Sequential gearbox, paddle-shift

=== Applications ===
- Dallara DW12
