= 2026 Children's of Alabama Indy Grand Prix =

Indycar race held in Long Beach, California

(United States) 2026 Children's of Alabama Indy Grand Prix
Race details
4th round of the 2026 IndyCar season
← Previous race	Next race →
- Layout of Barber Motorsports Park
- Date: March 29, 2026
- Official name: Children's of Alabama Indy Grand Prix
- Location: Barber Motorsports Park, Birmingham, Alabama
- Course: Permanent road course 2.380 mi / 3.830 km
- Distance: 90 laps 214.200 mi / 344.700 km
- Weather: Partially cloudy 21 °C (70 °F)

Pole position
- Driver: (Spain) Álex Palou (Chip Ganassi Racing)
- Time: 1:06.2341

Fastest lap
- Driver: (Denmark) Christian Lundgaard (Arrow McLaren)
- Time: 1:08.6127 (on lap 19 of 90)

Podium
- First: (Spain) Álex Palou (Chip Ganassi Racing)
- Second: (Denmark) Christian Lundgaard (Arrow McLaren)
- Third: (United States) Graham Rahal (Rahal Letterman Lanigan Racing)

Chronology
Previous	Next
2025	2027

The 2026 Children's of Alabama Indy Grand Prix was the fourth round of the 2026 IndyCar season. The race was held on March 29, 2026, in Birmingham, Alabama at Barber Motorsports Park. The race was contested of 90 laps. Álex Palou won the race, Christian Lundgaard finished second, and Graham Rahal finished third, his first podium since the 2023 Gallagher Grand Prix.

== Background ==
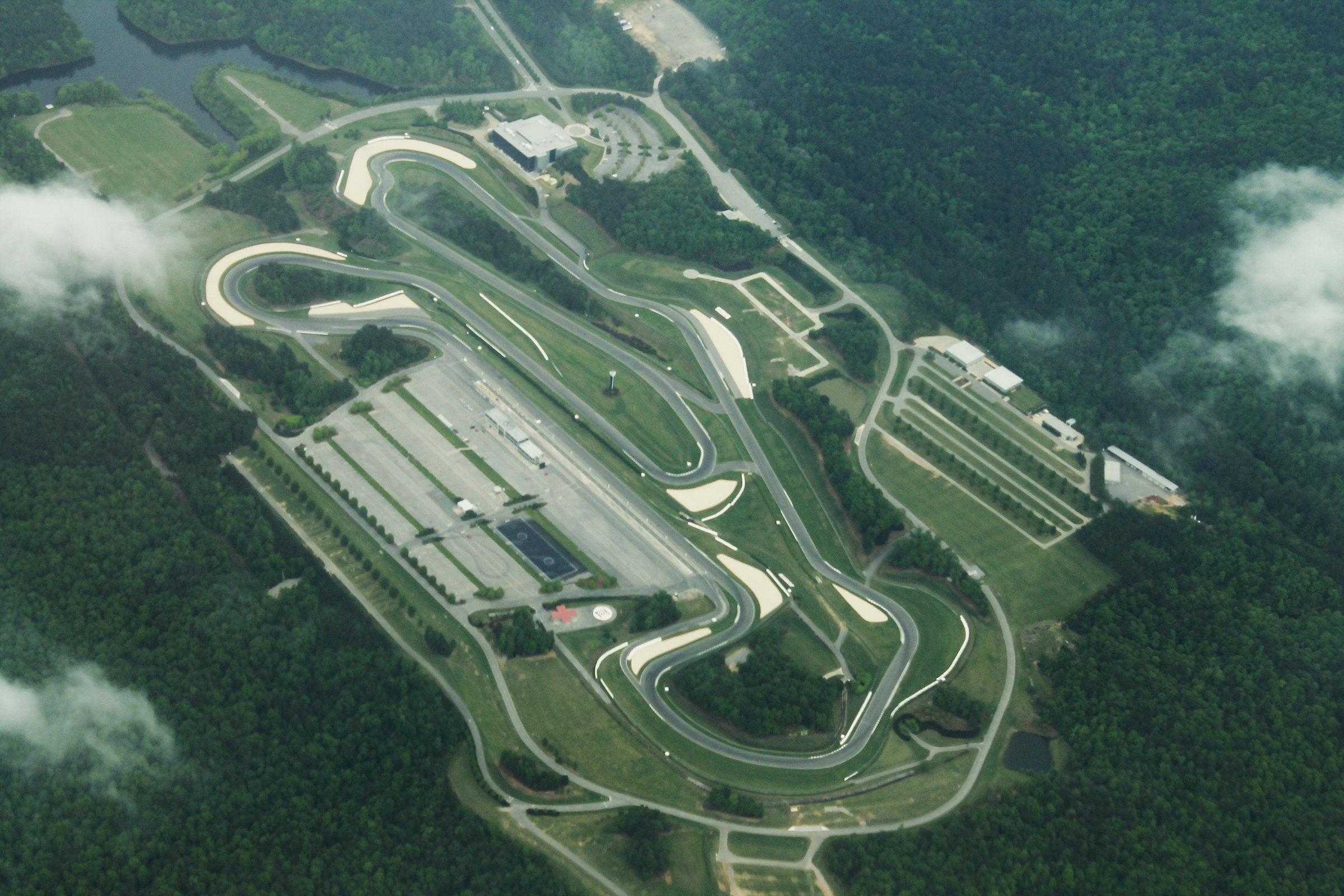
Barber Motorsports Park, the track where the race was held.

Barber Motorsports Park is an 880-acre (360 ha) racing facility in Birmingham, Alabama. It was built by George W. Barber and includes the 230,000-square-foot (21,000 m^{2}) Barber Vintage Motorsport Museum. It is a 2.3 mi (3.7 km) permanent road course with 17 turns and features 80 feet of elevation change. It has been the site of the IndyCar Series' Grand Prix of Alabama since 2010.

== Entry list ==
Key	Meaning
R	Rookie
W	Past winner

No.	Driver	Team	Engine
2	(United States) Josef Newgarden W	Team Penske	Chevrolet
3	(New Zealand) Scott McLaughlin W	Team Penske	Chevrolet
4	(Brazil) Caio Collet R	A.J. Foyt Racing	Chevrolet
5	(Mexico) Pato O'Ward W	Arrow McLaren	Chevrolet
6	(United States) Nolan Siegel	Arrow McLaren	Chevrolet
7	(Denmark) Christian Lundgaard	Arrow McLaren	Chevrolet
8	(Cayman Islands) Kyffin Simpson	Chip Ganassi Racing	Honda
9	(New Zealand) Scott Dixon	Chip Ganassi Racing	Honda
10	(Spain) Álex Palou W	Chip Ganassi Racing	Honda
12	(United States) David Malukas	Team Penske	Chevrolet
14	(United States) Santino Ferrucci	A. J. Foyt Racing	Chevrolet
15	(United States) Graham Rahal	Rahal Letterman Lanigan Racing	Honda
18	(France) Romain Grosjean	Dale Coyne Racing	Honda
19	(Norway) Dennis Hauger R	Dale Coyne Racing	Honda
20	(United States) Alexander Rossi	ECR	Chevrolet
21	(Denmark) Christian Rasmussen	ECR	Chevrolet
26	(Australia) Will Power W	Andretti Global	Honda
27	(United States) Kyle Kirkwood	Andretti Global with Curb-Agajanian	Honda
28	(Sweden) Marcus Ericsson	Andretti Global	Honda
45	(United Kingdom) Louis Foster	Rahal Letterman Lanigan Racing	Honda
47	(Germany) Mick Schumacher R	Rahal Letterman Lanigan Racing	Honda
60	(Sweden) Felix Rosenqvist	Meyer Shank Racing with Curb-Agajanian	Honda
66	(New Zealand) Marcus Armstrong	Meyer Shank Racing with Curb-Agajanian	Honda
76	(Netherlands) Rinus VeeKay	Juncos Hollinger Racing	Chevrolet
77	(United States) Sting Ray Robb	Juncos Hollinger Racing	Chevrolet

== Practice ==
=== Practice 1 ===
The first practice session was held on March 27, 2026.

Top Practice Speeds
Pos	No.	Driver	Team	Engine	Lap Time
1	3	(New Zealand) Scott McLaughlin W	Team Penske	Chevrolet	1:07.3840
2	27	(United States) Kyle Kirkwood	Andretti Global	Honda	1:07.4128
3	5	(Mexico) Pato O'Ward W	Arrow McLaren	Chevrolet	1:07.4158
Official results

=== Practice 2 ===
The second practice session was held on March 28, 2026, but ended early due to Scott McLaughlin's car crashing and going through the fence at the end of turn 1.

Top Practice Speeds
Pos	No.	Driver	Team	Engine	Lap Time
1	10	(Spain) Álex Palou W	Chip Ganassi Racing	Honda	1:06.4680
2	27	(United States) Kyle Kirkwood	Andretti Global	Honda	1:06.5217
3	76	(Netherlands) Rinus VeeKay	Juncos Hollinger Racing	Chevrolet	1:06.5950
Official results

== Qualifying ==
Qualifying was held on March 28, 2026.

Classification
Pos	No.	Driver	Team	Engine	Time	Final grid
1	10	(Spain) Álex Palou W	Chip Ganassi Racing	Honda	**1:06.2341**	1
2	12	(United States) David Malukas	Team Penske	Chevrolet	1:06.3478	2
3	15	(United States) Graham Rahal	Rahal Letterman Lanigan Racing	Honda	1:06.5181	3
4	66	(New Zealand) Marcus Armstrong	Meyer Shank Racing	Honda	1:06.5312	4
5	27	(United States) Kyle Kirkwood	Andretti Global	Honda	1:06.8326	5
6	18	(France) Romain Grosjean	Dale Coyne Racing	Honda	1:06.8363	6
7	14	(United States) Santino Ferrucci	A.J. Foyt Enterprises	Chevrolet	1:06.3769	7
8	28	(Sweden) Marcus Ericsson	Andretti Global	Honda	1:06.3900	8
9	2	(United States) Josef Newgarden W	Team Penske	Chevrolet	1:06.4256	9
10	7	(Denmark) Christian Lundgaard	Arrow McLaren	Chevrolet	1:06.5102	10
11	20	(United States) Alexander Rossi	ECR	Chevrolet	1:06.6873	11
12	5	(Mexico) Pato O'Ward W	Arrow McLaren	Chevrolet	1:06.8186	12
13	9	(New Zealand) Scott Dixon	Chip Ganassi Racing	Honda	1:06.5267	13
14	3	(New Zealand) Scott McLaughlin W	Team Penske	Chevrolet	1:06.7313	14
15	6	(United States) Nolan Siegel	Arrow McLaren	Chevrolet	1:06.5881	15
16	76	(Netherlands) Rinus VeeKay	Juncos Hollinger Racing	Chevrolet	1:06.7411	16
17	21	(Denmark) Christian Rasmussen	ECR	Chevrolet	1:06.7124	17
18	60	(Sweden) Felix Rosenqvist	Meyer Shank Racing	Honda	1:06.8104	18
19	8	(Cayman Islands) Kyffin Simpson	Chip Ganassi Racing	Honda	1:06.7938	19
20	47	(Germany) Mick Schumacher R	Rahal Letterman Lanigan Racing	Honda	1:06.8140	20
21	4	(Brazil) Caio Collet R	A.J. Foyt Enterprises	Chevrolet	1:06.8444	21
22	45	(United Kingdom) Louis Foster	Rahal Letterman Lanigan Racing	Honda	1:06.9445	22
23	26	(Australia) Will Power W	Andretti Global	Honda	1:09.9808	23
24	19	(Norway) Dennis Hauger R	Dale Coyne Racing	Honda	1:07.3414	24
25	77	(United States) Sting Ray Robb	Juncos Hollinger Racing	Chevrolet	1:07.6109	25
Official results

Notes

- **Bold text** indicates fastest time.

== Warmup ==
The warmup session was held on March 29, 2026.

Top Practice Speeds
Pos	No.	Driver	Team	Engine	Lap Time
1	9	(New Zealand) Scott Dixon	Chip Ganassi Racing	Honda	1:06.6933
2	15	(United States) Graham Rahal	Rahal Letterman Lanigan Racing	Honda	1:06.7568
3	60	(Sweden) Felix Rosenqvist	Meyer Shank Racing	Honda	1:06.9815
Official results

== Race ==
The race was held on March 29, 2026.

Classification
Pos	No.	Driver	Team	Engine	Laps	Time/Retired	Pit Stops	Grid	Laps Led	Pts.
1	10	(Spain) Álex Palou W	Chip Ganassi Racing	Honda	90	1:45:57.8223	3	1	79	54
2	7	(Denmark) Christian Lundgaard	Arrow McLaren	Chevrolet	90	1:46:11.0998	3	10	10	41
3	15	(United States) Graham Rahal	Rahal Letterman Lanigan Racing	Honda	90	1:46:12.1100	3	3	1	36
4	12	(United States) David Malukas	Team Penske	Chevrolet	90	1:46:12.8180	3	2	0	32
5	27	(United States) Kyle Kirkwood	Andretti Global	Honda	90	1:46:15.6193	3	5	0	30
6	66	(New Zealand) Marcus Armstrong	Meyer Shank Racing	Honda	90	1:46:18.5628	3	4	0	28
7	9	(New Zealand) Scott Dixon	Chip Ganassi Racing	Honda	90	1:46:22.5682	3	13	0	26
8	14	(United States) Santino Ferrucci	A.J. Foyt Enterprises	Chevrolet	90	1:46:39.3924	3	7	0	24
9	28	(Sweden) Marcus Ericsson	Andretti Global	Honda	90	1:46:41.6816	3	8	0	22
10	2	(United States) Josef Newgarden W	Team Penske	Chevrolet	90	1:46:49.7199	3	9	0	20
11	20	(United States) Alexander Rossi	ECR	Chevrolet	90	1:46:50.8052	3	11	0	19
12	26	(Australia) Will Power W	Andretti Global	Honda	90	1:46:51.8701	3	23	0	18
13	60	(Sweden) Felix Rosenqvist	Meyer Shank Racing	Honda	90	1:46:52.3249	3	18	0	17
14	76	(Netherlands) Rinus VeeKay	Juncos Hollinger Racing	Chevrolet	90	1:46:52.7449	3	18	0	16
15	18	(France) Romain Grosjean	Dale Coyne Racing	Honda	90	1:46:56.6806	3	6	0	15
16	3	(New Zealand) Scott McLaughlin W	Team Penske	Chevrolet	90	1:46:57.9601	3	14	0	14
17	5	(Mexico) Pato O'Ward W	Arrow McLaren	Chevrolet	90	1:46:58.8915	3	12	0	13
18	6	(United States) Nolan Siegel	Arrow McLaren	Chevrolet	90	1:47:00.2294	3	15	0	12
19	21	(Denmark) Christian Rasmussen	ECR	Chevrolet	90	1:47:01.0906	3	17	0	11
20	8	(Cayman Islands) Kyffin Simpson	Chip Ganassi Racing	Honda	90	1:47:01.8379	3	19	0	10
21	4	(Brazil) Caio Collet R	A.J. Foyt Racing	Chevrolet	90	1:47:04.1248	3	21	0	9
22	77	(United States) Sting Ray Robb	Juncos Hollinger Racing	Chevrolet	89	1:46:06.8047	3	25	0	8
23	19	(Norway) Dennis Hauger R	Dale Coyne Racing	Honda	89	1:46:07.4969	3	24	0	7
24	47	(Germany) Mick Schumacher R	Rahal Letterman Lanigan Racing	Honda	89	1:46:10.7110	3	20	0	6
25	45	(United Kingdom) Louis Foster	Rahal Letterman Lanigan Racing	Honda	89	1:46:35.2884	4	22	0	5
Fastest lap: (Denmark) Christian Lundgaard (Arrow McLaren) – 1:08.6127 (Lap 19)
Official results

== Championship standings after the race ==
Drivers' Championship standings

	Pos.	Driver	Points
Unchanged	1	(United States) Kyle Kirkwood	156
Unchanged	2	(Spain) Álex Palou	154
Plus	3	(Denmark) Christian Lundgaard	121
Plus	4	(United States) David Malukas	116
Minus	5	(United States) Josef Newgarden	113
Point standings

Engine manufacturer standings

	Pos.	Manufacturer	Points
Plus	1	Honda	344
Minus	2	Chevrolet	297
Point standings

- Note: Only the top five positions are included.

Previous race: 2026 Java House Grand Prix of Arlington	IndyCar Series; 2026 season	Next race: 2026 Acura Grand Prix of Long Beach
Previous race: 2025 Children's of Alabama Indy Grand Prix	Children's of Alabama Indy Grand Prix	Next race: 2027 Children's of Alabama Indy Grand Prix
