= 2025 Children's of Alabama Indy Grand Prix =

Indycar race held in Long Beach, California

(United States) 2025 Children's of Alabama Indy Grand Prix
Race details
4th round of the 2025 IndyCar season
← Previous race	Next race →
- Layout of the Barber Motorsports Park
- Date: May 4, 2025
- Official name: Children's of Alabama Indy Grand Prix
- Location: Barber Motorsports Park, Birmingham, Alabama
- Course: Permanent road course 2.380 mi / 3.830 km
- Distance: 90 laps 214.200 mi / 344.700 km
- Weather: Partially Cloudy 19 °C (66 °F)

Pole position
- Driver: (Spain) Álex Palou (Chip Ganassi Racing)
- Time: 01:07.2918

Fastest lap
- Driver: (Spain) Álex Palou (Chip Ganassi Racing)
- Time: 1:09.0177 (on lap 4 of 90)

Podium
- First: (Spain) Álex Palou (Chip Ganassi Racing)
- Second: (Denmark) Christian Lundgaard (Arrow McLaren)
- Third: (New Zealand) Scott McLaughlin (Team Penske)

Chronology
Previous	Next
2024	2026

The 2025 Children's of Alabama Indy Grand Prix was the fourth round of the 2025 IndyCar season. The race was held on May 4, 2025, in Birmingham, Alabama at Barber Motorsports Park. The race was contested of 90 laps. Álex Palou won the race, Christian Lundgaard finished 2nd, and Scott McLaughlin finished 3rd. Rinus VeeKay and Will Power rounded out the top five, while Pato O'Ward, Colton Herta, Alexander Rossi, Nolan Siegel, and Josef Newgarden rounded out the top ten.

== Entry list ==
Key	Meaning
R	Rookie
W	Past winner

No.	Driver	Team	Engine
2	(United States) Josef Newgarden W	Team Penske	Chevrolet
3	(New Zealand) Scott McLaughlin W	Team Penske	Chevrolet
4	(United States) David Malukas	A. J. Foyt Racing	Chevrolet
5	(Mexico) Pato O'Ward W	Arrow McLaren	Chevrolet
6	(United States) Nolan Siegel R	Arrow McLaren	Chevrolet
7	(Denmark) Christian Lundgaard	Arrow McLaren	Chevrolet
8	(Cayman Islands) Kyffin Simpson	Chip Ganassi Racing	Honda
9	(New Zealand) Scott Dixon	Chip Ganassi Racing	Honda
10	(Spain) Álex Palou W	Chip Ganassi Racing	Honda
12	(Australia) Will Power W	Team Penske	Chevrolet
14	(United States) Santino Ferrucci	A. J. Foyt Racing	Chevrolet
15	(United States) Graham Rahal	Rahal Letterman Lanigan Racing	Honda
18	(Netherlands) Rinus VeeKay	Dale Coyne Racing	Honda
20	(United States) Alexander Rossi	ECR	Chevrolet
21	(Denmark) Christian Rasmussen	ECR	Chevrolet
26	(United States) Colton Herta	Andretti Global with Curb-Agajanian	Honda
27	(United States) Kyle Kirkwood	Andretti Global	Honda
28	(Sweden) Marcus Ericsson	Andretti Global	Honda
30	(Canada) Devlin DeFrancesco	Rahal Letterman Lanigan Racing	Honda
45	(United Kingdom) Louis Foster R	Rahal Letterman Lanigan Racing	Honda
51	(United States) Jacob Abel R	Dale Coyne Racing	Honda
60	(Sweden) Felix Rosenqvist	Meyer Shank Racing	Honda
66	(New Zealand) Marcus Armstrong	Meyer Shank Racing	Honda
76	(United States) Conor Daly	Juncos Hollinger Racing	Chevrolet
77	(United States) Sting Ray Robb	Juncos Hollinger Racing	Chevrolet
83	(Israel) Robert Shwartzman R	Prema Racing	Chevrolet
90	(United Kingdom) Callum Ilott	Prema Racing	Chevrolet

== Practice ==
=== Practice 1 ===
Top Practice Speeds
Pos	No.	Driver	Team	Engine	Lap Time
1	28	(Sweden) Marcus Ericsson	Andretti Global	Honda	01:07.7470
2	10	(Spain) Álex Palou W	Chip Ganassi Racing	Honda	01:07.7602
3	26	(United States) Colton Herta	Andretti Global with Curb-Agajanian	Honda	01:07.7728
Official report

=== Practice 2 ===
Top Practice Speeds
Pos	No.	Driver	Team	Engine	Lap Time
1	4	(United States) David Malukas	A. J. Foyt Racing	Chevrolet	01:08.1661
2	10	(Spain) Álex Palou W	Chip Ganassi Racing	Honda	01:08.1958
3	7	(Denmark) Christian Lundgaard	Arrow McLaren	Chevrolet	01:08.3082
Official report

== Qualifying ==
Qualifying was held at 2:30 PM ET on May 3, 2025.

=== Qualifying classification ===
Pos	No.	Driver	Team	Engine	Time				Final grid
Pos	No.	Driver	Team	Engine	Round 1		Round 2	Round 3	Final grid
Pos	No.	Driver	Team	Engine	Group 1	Group 2	Round 2	Round 3	Final grid
1	10	(Spain) Álex Palou **W**	Chip Ganassi Racing	Honda	**1:07.1674**	—N/a	1:07.3168	**1:07.2918**	1
2	3	(New Zealand) Scott McLaughlin **W**	Team Penske	Chevrolet	1:07.2437	—N/a	1:07.4405	1:07.4387	2
3	26	(United States) Colton Herta	Andretti Global w/ Curb-Agajanian	Honda	—N/a	**1:07.2725**	1:07.3820	1:07.4576	3
4	12	(Australia) Will Power **W**	Team Penske	Chevrolet	1:07.7711	—N/a	**1:07.2343**	1:07.5616	4
5	18	(Netherlands) Rinus VeeKay	Dale Coyne Racing	Honda	—N/a	1:07.5504	1:07.4440	1:07.9103	5
6	6	(United States) Nolan Siegel **R**	Arrow McLaren	Chevrolet	1:07.7236	—N/a	1:07.6163	1:08.0470	6
7	7	(Denmark) Christian Lundgaard	Arrow McLaren	Chevrolet	—N/a	1:07.4148	1:07.6950	—N/a	7
8	5	(Mexico) Pato O'Ward **W**	Arrow McLaren	Chevrolet	1:07.6356	—N/a	1:07.7056	—N/a	8
9	2	(United States) Josef Newgarden	Team Penske	Chevrolet	—N/a	1:07.3983	1:07.7684	—N/a	9
10	8	(Cayman Islands) Kyffin Simpson	Chip Ganassi Racing	Honda	—N/a	1:07.5082	1:07.8806	—N/a	10
11	66	(New Zealand) Marcus Armstrong	Meyer Shank Racing	Honda	1:07.5686	—N/a	1:08.2031	—N/a	11
12	45	(United Kingdom) Louis Foster **R**	Rahal Letterman Lanigan Racing	Honda	—N/a	1:07.7328	1:08.4427	—N/a	12
13	14	(United States) Santino Ferrucci	A. J. Foyt Racing	Chevrolet	1:07.8228	—N/a	—N/a	—N/a	13
14	60	(Sweden) Felix Rosenqvist	Meyer Shank Racing	Honda	—N/a	1:07.7483	—N/a	—N/a	14
15	20	(United States) Alexander Rossi	ECR	Chevrolet	1:07.8807	—N/a	—N/a	—N/a	15
16	90	(United Kingdom) Callum Ilott	Prema Racing	Chevrolet	—N/a	1:07.7733	—N/a	—N/a	16
17	21	(Denmark) Christian Rasmussen	ECR	Chevrolet	1:07.8874	—N/a	—N/a	—N/a	17
18	27	(United States) Kyle Kirkwood	Andretti Global	Honda	—N/a	1:07.8239	—N/a	—N/a	18
19	76	(United States) Conor Daly	Juncos Hollinger Racing	Chevrolet	1:08.0017	—N/a	—N/a	—N/a	19
20	4	(United States) David Malukas	A. J. Foyt Racing	Chevrolet	—N/a	1:07.8459	—N/a	—N/a	20
21	15	(United States) Graham Rahal	Rahal Letterman Lanigan Racing	Honda	1:08.0106	—N/a	—N/a	—N/a	21
22	77	(United States) Sting Ray Robb	Juncos Hollinger Racing	Chevrolet	—N/a	1:08.1802	—N/a	—N/a	22
23	28	(Sweden) Marcus Ericsson	Andretti Global	Honda	1:08.0146	—N/a	—N/a	—N/a	23
24	83	(Israel) Robert Shwartzman **R**	Prema Racing	Chevrolet	—N/a	1:08.2584	—N/a	—N/a	24
25	51	(United States) Jacob Abel **R**	Dale Coyne Racing	Honda	1:08.3762	—N/a	—N/a	—N/a	25
26	9	(New Zealand) Scott Dixon	Chip Ganassi Racing	Honda	—N/a	1:08.8715	—N/a	—N/a	26
27	30	(Canada) Devlin DeFrancesco	Rahal Letterman Lanigan Racing	Honda	—N/a	1:09.0373	—N/a	—N/a	27
Qualifying results

Notes

- **Bold text** indicates fastest time set in session.

== Warmup ==
Top Practice Speeds
Pos	No.	Driver	Team	Engine	Lap Time
1	10	(Spain) Álex Palou W	Chip Ganassi Racing	Honda	1:07.9015
2	5	(Mexico) Pato O'Ward W	Arrow McLaren	Chevrolet	1:08.1494
3	26	(United States) Colton Herta	Andretti Global w/ Curb-Agajanian	Honda	1:08.1801
Warmup results

== Race ==
The race was held at 1:30 PM ET on May 4, 2025.

=== Race classification ===
Pos	No.	Driver	Team	Engine	Laps	Time/Retired	Pit Stops	Grid	Laps Led	Pts.
1	10	(Spain) Álex Palou W	Chip Ganassi Racing	Honda	90	1:46:33.1523	3	1	81	54
2	7	(Denmark) Christian Lundgaard	Arrow McLaren	Chevrolet	90	+16.0035	3	7	0	40
3	3	(New Zealand) Scott McLaughlin W	Team Penske	Chevrolet	90	+23.4453	3	2	3	36
4	18	(Netherlands) Rinus VeeKay	Dale Coyne Racing	Honda	90	+23.7783	3	5	0	32
5	12	(Australia) Will Power W	Team Penske	Chevrolet	90	+32.7718	3	4	0	30
6	5	(Mexico) Pato O'Ward W	Arrow McLaren	Chevrolet	90	+33.2559	3	8	0	28
7	26	(United States) Colton Herta	Andretti Global w/ Curb-Agajanian	Honda	90	+34.0216	3	3	0	26
8	20	(United States) Alexander Rossi	ECR	Chevrolet	90	+45.7556	3	15	0	24
9	6	(United States) Nolan Siegel	Arrow McLaren	Chevrolet	90	+46.2254	3	6	0	22
10	2	(United States) Josef Newgarden W	Team Penske	Chevrolet	90	+48.0484	3	9	0	20
11	27	(United States) Kyle Kirkwood	Andretti Global	Honda	90	+57.9913	3	18	0	19
12	9	(New Zealand) Scott Dixon	Chip Ganassi Racing	Honda	90	+58.6974	3	26	0	18
13	60	(Sweden) Felix Rosenqvist	Meyer Shank Racing	Honda	90	+59.3510	3	14	0	17
14	15	(United States) Graham Rahal	Rahal Letterman Lanigan Racing	Honda	90	+1:08.2589	3	21	0	16
15	21	(Denmark) Christian Rasmussen	ECR	Chevrolet	90	+1:09.2260	3	17	0	15
16	4	(United States) David Malukas	A. J. Foyt Racing	Chevrolet	90	+1:10.1133	3	20	0	14
17	66	(New Zealand) Marcus Armstrong	Meyer Shank Racing	Honda	89	+1 Lap	4	11	6	14
18	14	(United States) Santino Ferrucci	A. J. Foyt Racing	Chevrolet	89	+1 Lap	4	13	0	12
19	76	(United States) Conor Daly	Juncos Hollinger Racing	Chevrolet	89	+1 Lap	3	19	0	11
20	28	(Sweden) Marcus Ericsson	Andretti Global	Honda	89	+1 Lap	3	23	0	10
21	8	(Cayman Islands) Kyffin Simpson	Chip Ganassi Racing	Honda	89	+1 Lap	3	10	0	9
22	77	(United States) Sting Ray Robb	Juncos Hollinger Racing	Chevrolet	89	+1 Lap	3	22	0	8
23	90	(United Kingdom) Callum Ilott	Prema Racing	Chevrolet	89	+1 Lap	3	16	0	7
24	30	(Canada) Devlin DeFrancesco	Rahal Letterman Lanigan Racing	Honda	89	+1 Lap	3	27	0	6
25	83	(Israel) Robert Shwartzman R	Prema Racing	Chevrolet	89	+1 Lap	3	24	0	5
26	45	(United Kingdom) Louis Foster R	Rahal Letterman Lanigan Racing	Honda	88	+2 Laps	3	12	0	5
27	51	(United States) Jacob Abel R	Dale Coyne Racing	Honda	88	+2 Laps	4	25	0	5
Fastest lap: (Spain) Álex Palou — 1:09.0177 (lap 4)
Official results

== Championship standings after the race ==
Drivers' Championship standings

	Pos.	Driver	Points
Unchanged	1	(Spain) Álex Palou	196
	2	(Denmark) Christian Lundgaard	136 (–60)
	3	(United States) Kyle Kirkwood	127 (–69)
	4	(Mexico) Pato O'Ward	108 (–88)
	5	(New Zealand) Scott McLaughlin	105 (–91)

Engine manufacturer standings

	Pos.	Manufacturer	Points
Unchanged	1	Honda	366
Unchanged	2	Chevrolet	284 (–82)

- Note: Only the top five positions are included.

Previous race: 2025 Acura Grand Prix of Long Beach	IndyCar Series; 2025 season	Next race: 2025 Sonsio Grand Prix
Previous race: 2024 Children's of Alabama Indy Grand Prix	Indy Grand Prix of Alabama	Next race: 2026 Children's of Alabama Indy Grand Prix
