= 2024 Acura Grand Prix of Long Beach =

Indycar race held in Long Beach, California

(United States) 2024 Acura Grand Prix of Long Beach
Race details
2nd round of the 2024 IndyCar season
← Previous race	Next race →
- Long Beach Street Circuit
- Date: April 21, 2024
- Official name: Acura Grand Prix of Long Beach
- Location: Long Beach Street Circuit
- Course: Temporary street circuit 1.968 mi / 3.167 km
- Distance: 85 laps 167.28 mi / 261.211 km

Pole position
- Driver: (Sweden) Felix Rosenqvist (Meyer Shank Racing)
- Time: 01:06.0172

Fastest lap
- Driver: (Sweden) Marcus Ericsson (Andretti Global)
- Time: 01:07.7690 (on lap 71 of 85)

Podium
- First: (New Zealand) Scott Dixon (Chip Ganassi Racing)
- Second: (United States) Colton Herta (Andretti Global with Curb-Agajanian)
- Third: (Spain) Álex Palou (Chip Ganassi Racing)

Chronology
Previous	Next
2023	2025

The 2024 Acura Grand Prix of Long Beach was the second round of the 2024 IndyCar season. The race was held on April 21, 2024, in Long Beach, California at the Long Beach Street Circuit. The race consisted of 85 laps and was won by Scott Dixon.

== Entry list ==
Key	Meaning
R	Rookie
W	Past winner

No.	Driver	Team	Engine
2	(United States) Josef Newgarden W	Team Penske	Chevrolet
3	(New Zealand) Scott McLaughlin	Team Penske	Chevrolet
4	(Cayman Islands) Kyffin Simpson R	Chip Ganassi Racing	Honda
5	(Mexico) Pato O'Ward	Arrow McLaren	Chevrolet
6	(France) Théo Pourchaire R	Arrow McLaren	Chevrolet
7	(United States) Alexander Rossi W	Arrow McLaren	Chevrolet
8	(Sweden) Linus Lundqvist R	Chip Ganassi Racing	Honda
9	(New Zealand) Scott Dixon W	Chip Ganassi Racing	Honda
10	(Spain) Álex Palou	Chip Ganassi Racing	Honda
11	(New Zealand) Marcus Armstrong	Chip Ganassi Racing	Honda
12	(Australia) Will Power W	Team Penske	Chevrolet
14	(United States) Santino Ferrucci	A.J. Foyt Enterprises	Chevrolet
15	(United States) Graham Rahal	Rahal Letterman Lanigan Racing	Honda
18	(United Kingdom) Jack Harvey	Dale Coyne Racing	Honda
20	(Denmark) Christian Rasmussen R	Ed Carpenter Racing	Chevrolet
21	(Netherlands) Rinus VeeKay	Ed Carpenter Racing	Chevrolet
26	(United States) Colton Herta W	Andretti Global with Curb-Agajanian	Honda
27	(United States) Kyle Kirkwood W	Andretti Global	Honda
28	(Sweden) Marcus Ericsson	Andretti Global	Honda
30	(Brazil) Pietro Fittipaldi	Rahal Letterman Lanigan Racing	Honda
41	(United States) Sting Ray Robb	A.J. Foyt Enterprises	Chevrolet
45	(Denmark) Christian Lundgaard	Rahal Letterman Lanigan Racing	Honda
51	(United States) Nolan Siegel R	Dale Coyne Racing with Rick Ware Racing	Honda
60	(Sweden) Felix Rosenqvist	Meyer Shank Racing	Honda
66	(United Kingdom) Tom Blomqvist R	Meyer Shank Racing	Honda
77	(France) Romain Grosjean	Juncos Hollinger Racing	Chevrolet
78	(Argentina) Agustín Canapino	Juncos Hollinger Racing	Chevrolet

== Practice ==
=== Practice 1 ===
Top Practice Speeds
Pos	No.	Driver	Team	Engine	Lap Time
1	5	(Mexico) Pato O'Ward	Arrow McLaren	Chevrolet	01:06.6874
2	12	(Australia) Will Power W	Team Penske	Chevrolet	01:06.7811
3	3	(New Zealand) Scott McLaughlin	Team Penske	Chevrolet	01:06.8258

=== Practice 2 ===
Top Practice Speeds
Pos	No.	Driver	Team	Engine	Lap Time
1	27	(United States) Kyle Kirkwood W	Andretti Global	Honda	01:06.4731
2	26	(United States) Colton Herta W	Andretti Global with Curb-Agajanian	Honda	01:06.4886
3	45	(Denmark) Christian Lundgaard	Rahal Letterman Lanigan Racing	Honda	01:06.5831

== Qualifying ==
=== Qualifying classification ===
Pos	No.	Driver	Team	Engine	Time				Final grid
Pos	No.	Driver	Team	Engine	Round 1		Round 2	Round 3	Final grid
Pos	No.	Driver	Team	Engine	Group 1	Group 2	Round 2	Round 3	Final grid
1	60	(Sweden) Felix Rosenqvist	Meyer Shank Racing	Honda	**1:06.3372**	N/A	1:06.0674	**1:06.0172**	1
2	12	(Australia) Will Power **W**	Team Penske	Chevrolet	1:06.6388	N/A	1:06.1914	1:06.0211	2
3	2	(United States) Josef Newgarden **W**	Team Penske	Chevrolet	N/A	1:06.4123	1:06.0179	1:06.1059	3
4	26	(United States) Colton Herta **W**	Andretti Global with Curb-Agajanian	Honda	1:06.5245	N/A	1:06.0064	1:06.3784	4
5	28	(Sweden) Marcus Ericsson	Andretti Global	Honda	N/A	1:06.1768	1:06.0546	1:06.4039	5
6	10	(Spain) Álex Palou	Chip Ganassi Racing	Honda	1:06.7243	N/A	**1:05.9103**	1:06.5444	6
7	45	(Denmark) Christian Lundgaard	Rahal Letterman Lanigan Racing	Honda	N/A	1:06.3587	1:06.2107	N/A	7
8	9	(New Zealand) Scott Dixon **W**	Chip Ganassi Racing	Honda	1:06.5941	N/A	1:06.2219	N/A	8
9	11	(New Zealand) Marcus Armstrong	Chip Ganassi Racing	Honda	N/A	**1:06.1509**	1:06.2404	N/A	9
10	27	(United States) Kyle Kirkwood **W**	Andretti Global	Honda	N/A	1:06.2285	1:06.2672	N/A	10
11	3	(New Zealand) Scott McLaughlin	Team Penske	Chevrolet	N/A	1:06.2786	1:06.3504	N/A	11
12	15	(United States) Graham Rahal	Rahal Letterman Lanigan Racing	Honda	1:06.7910	N/A	1:06.5757	N/A	12
13	7	(United States) Alexander Rossi **W**	Arrow McLaren	Chevrolet	1:06.8349	N/A	N/A	N/A	13
14	5	(Mexico) Pato O'Ward	Arrow McLaren	Chevrolet	N/A	1:06.4572	N/A	N/A	14
15	66	(United Kingdom) Tom Blomqvist **R**	Meyer Shank Racing	Honda	1:07.0325	N/A	N/A	N/A	15
16	77	(France) Romain Grosjean	Juncos Hollinger Racing	Chevrolet	N/A	1:06.4706	N/A	N/A	16
17	8	(Sweden) Linus Lundqvist **R**	Chip Ganassi Racing	Honda	1:07.1022	N/A	N/A	N/A	17
18	21	(Netherlands) Rinus VeeKay	Ed Carpenter Racing	Chevrolet	N/A	1:06.7415	N/A	N/A	18
19	30	(Brazil) Pietro Fittipaldi	Rahal Letterman Lanigan Racing	Honda	1:07.1284	N/A	N/A	N/A	19
20	78	(Argentina) Agustín Canapino	Juncos Hollinger Racing	Chevrolet	N/A	1:06.8481	N/A	N/A	20
21	20	(Denmark) Christian Rasmussen **R**	Ed Carpenter Racing	Chevrolet	1:07.3332	N/A	N/A	N/A	21
22	6	(France) Théo Pourchaire **R**	Arrow McLaren	Chevrolet	N/A	1:06.9722	N/A	N/A	22
23	18	(United Kingdom) Jack Harvey	Dale Coyne Racing	Honda	1:07.6865	N/A	N/A	N/A	23
24	14	(United States) Santino Ferrucci	A. J. Foyt Enterprises	Chevrolet	N/A	1:07.1851	N/A	N/A	24
25	41	(United States) Sting Ray Robb	A. J. Foyt Enterprises	Chevrolet	1:09.5850	N/A	N/A	N/A	25
26	4	(Cayman Islands) Kyffin Simpson **R**	Chip Ganassi Racing	Honda	N/A	1:07.3125	N/A	N/A	26
27	51	(United States) Nolan Siegel **R**	Dale Coyne Racing with Rick Ware Racing	Honda	N/A	1:07.5848	N/A	N/A	27

Notes

- **Bold text** indicates fastest time set in session.

== Race ==
Scott Dixon took his first win of the season after a good strategy call put him at the front of the field.

=== Race results ===
Pos	No.	Driver	Team	Engine	Laps	Time/Retired	Pit Stops	Grid	Laps Led	Pts.
1	9	(New Zealand) Scott Dixon W	Chip Ganassi Racing	Honda	85	1:42:03.1416	2	8	42	53
2	26	(United States) Colton Herta W	Andretti Global with Curb-Agajanian	Honda	85	1:42:04.1214	2	4	7	41
3	10	(Spain) Alex Palou	Chip Ganassi Racing	Honda	85	1:42:04.9080	2	6	0	35
4	2	(United States) Josef Newgarden W	Team Penske	Chevrolet	85	1:42:07.1151	2	3	19	33
5	28	(Sweden) Marcus Ericsson	Andretti Global	Honda	85	1:42:07.5185	2	5	0	30
6	12	(Australia) Will Power W	Team Penske	Chevrolet	85	1:42:18.9055	2	2	15	29
7	27	(United States) Kyle Kirkwood W	Andretti Global	Honda	85	1:42:19.3204	2	10	1	27
8	77	(France) Romain Grosjean	Juncos Hollinger Racing	Chevrolet	85	1:42:21.1849	2	16	0	24
9	60	(Sweden) Felix Rosenqvist	Meyer Shank Racing	Honda	85	1:42:21.9571	2	1	1	24
10	7	(United States) Alexander Rossi W	Arrow McLaren	Chevrolet	85	1:42:35.2331	3	13	0	20
11	6	(France) Theo Pourchaire R	Arrow McLaren	Chevrolet	85	1:42:36.5825	2	22	0	19
12	11	(New Zealand) Marcus Armstrong	Chip Ganassi Racing	Honda	85	1:42:43.9623	2	9	0	18
13	8	(Sweden) Linus Lundqvist R	Chip Ganassi Racing	Honda	85	1:42:45.1419	2	17	0	17
14	21	(Netherlands) Rinus Veekay	Ed Carpenter Racing	Chevrolet	85	1:42:47.5741	2	18	0	16
15	78	(Argentina) Agustín Canapino	Juncos Hollinger Racing	Chevrolet	85	1:42:54.4572	3	20	0	15
16	5	(Mexico) Pato O'Ward	Arrow McLaren	Chevrolet	85	1:42:56.1377	3	14	0	14
17	15	(United States) Graham Rahal	Rahal Letterman Lanigan Racing	Honda	85	1:43:05.6606	2	12	0	13
18	41	(United States) Sting Ray Robb	A.J. Foyt Enterprises	Chevrolet	85	1:43:08.7314	2	25	0	12
19	4	(Cayman Islands) Kyffin Simpson R	Chip Ganassi Racing	Honda	84	+1 Lap	2	26	0	11
20	51	(United States) Nolan Siegel R	Dale Coyne Racing with Rick Ware Racing	Honda	84	+1 Lap	2	27	0	10
21	14	(United States) Santino Ferrucci	A.J. Foyt Enterprises	Chevrolet	84	+1 Lap	3	24	0	9
22	66	(United Kingdom) Tom Blomqvist R	Meyer Shank Racing	Honda	84	+1 Lap	3	15	0	8
23	45	(Denmark) Christian Lundgaard	Rahal Letterman Lanigan Racing	Honda	84	+1 Lap	3	7	0	7
24	30	(Brazil) Pietro Fittipaldi	Rahal Letterman Lanigan Racing	Honda	84	+1 Lap	3	19	0	6
25	18	(United Kingdom) Jack Harvey	Dale Coyne Racing	Honda	83	+2 Laps	4	23	0	5
26	3	(New Zealand) Scott McLaughlin	Team Penske	Chevrolet	71	+14 Laps	2	11	0	5
27	20	(Denmark) Christian Rasmussen R	Ed Carpenter Racing	Honda	14	Contact	0	21	0	5
Fastest lap: (Sweden) Marcus Ericsson (Andretti Global) – 01:07.7690 (lap 71)

Previous race: 2024 Firestone Grand Prix of St. Petersburg; 2024 $1 Million Challenge (Exhibition)	IndyCar Series; 2024 season	Next race: 2024 Children's of Alabama Indy Grand Prix
Previous race: 2023 Acura Grand Prix of Long Beach	Grand Prix of Long Beach	Next race: 2025 Acura Grand Prix of Long Beach
