= 2025 Acura Grand Prix of Long Beach =

Indycar race held in Long Beach, California

(United States) 2025 Acura Grand Prix of Long Beach
Race details
3rd round of the 2025 IndyCar season
← Previous race	Next race →
- Long Beach Street Circuit
- Date: April 13, 2025
- Official name: Acura Grand Prix of Long Beach
- Location: Long Beach Street Circuit
- Course: Temporary Street Circuit; 1.968 mi / 3.167 km
- Distance: 90 laps 177.12 mi / 285.05 km
- Weather: Partially cloudy 18 °C (64 °F)

Pole position
- Driver: (United States) Kyle Kirkwood (Andretti Global)
- Time: 1:06.1921

Fastest lap
- Driver: (Cayman Islands) Kyffin Simpson (Chip Ganassi Racing)
- Time: 1:08.1355 (on lap 32 of 90)

Podium
- First: (United States) Kyle Kirkwood (Andretti Global)
- Second: (Spain) Álex Palou (Chip Ganassi Racing)
- Third: (Denmark) Christian Lundgaard (Arrow McLaren)

Chronology
Previous	Next
2024	2026

The 2025 Acura Grand Prix of Long Beach was the third round of the 2025 IndyCar season. The race was held on April 13, 2025 in Long Beach, California at the Long Beach Street Circuit. The race was contested of 90 laps. Kyle Kirkwood won the race, Álex Palou finished 2nd, and Christian Lundgaard finished 3rd. Felix Rosenqvist and Will Power rounded out the top five, while Scott McLaughlin, Colton Herta, Scott Dixon, Sting Ray Robb, and Kyffin Simpson rounded out the top ten.

== Entry list ==
Key	Meaning
R	Rookie
W	Past winner

No.	Driver	Team	Engine
2	(United States) Josef Newgarden W	Team Penske	Chevrolet
3	(New Zealand) Scott McLaughlin	Team Penske	Chevrolet
4	(United States) David Malukas	A. J. Foyt Racing	Chevrolet
5	(Mexico) Pato O'Ward	Arrow McLaren	Chevrolet
6	(United States) Nolan Siegel R	Arrow McLaren	Chevrolet
7	(Denmark) Christian Lundgaard	Arrow McLaren	Chevrolet
8	(Cayman Islands) Kyffin Simpson	Chip Ganassi Racing	Honda
9	(New Zealand) Scott Dixon W	Chip Ganassi Racing	Honda
10	(Spain) Álex Palou	Chip Ganassi Racing	Honda
12	(Australia) Will Power W	Team Penske	Chevrolet
14	(United States) Santino Ferrucci	A. J. Foyt Racing	Chevrolet
15	(United States) Graham Rahal	Rahal Letterman Lanigan Racing	Honda
18	(Netherlands) Rinus VeeKay	Dale Coyne Racing	Honda
20	(United States) Alexander Rossi W	ECR	Chevrolet
21	(Denmark) Christian Rasmussen	ECR	Chevrolet
24	(United Kingdom) Jack Harvey	DRR-Cusick Motorsports	Chevrolet
26	(United States) Colton Herta W	Andretti Global with Curb-Agajanian	Honda
27	(United States) Kyle Kirkwood W	Andretti Global	Honda
28	(Sweden) Marcus Ericsson	Andretti Global	Honda
30	(Canada) Devlin DeFrancesco	Rahal Letterman Lanigan Racing	Honda
33	(United States) Ed Carpenter	ECR	Chevrolet
45	(United Kingdom) Louis Foster R	Rahal Letterman Lanigan Racing	Honda
51	(United States) Jacob Abel R	Dale Coyne Racing	Honda
60	(Sweden) Felix Rosenqvist	Meyer Shank Racing	Honda
66	(New Zealand) Marcus Armstrong	Meyer Shank Racing	Honda
76	(United States) Conor Daly	Juncos Hollinger Racing	Chevrolet
77	(United States) Sting Ray Robb	Juncos Hollinger Racing	Chevrolet
83	(Israel) Robert Shwartzman R	Prema Racing	Chevrolet
90	(United Kingdom) Callum Ilott	Prema Racing	Chevrolet

== Practice ==
=== Practice 1 ===
Top Practice Speeds
Pos	No.	Driver	Team	Engine	Lap Time
1	12	(Australia) Will Power W	Team Penske	Chevrolet	01:07.3227
2	28	(Sweden) Marcus Ericsson	Andretti Global	Honda	01:07.3503
3	27	(United States) Kyle Kirkwood W	Andretti Global	Honda	01:07.3523
Practice 1 results

=== Practice 2 ===
Top Practice Speeds
Pos	No.	Driver	Team	Engine	Lap Time
1	6	(United States) Nolan Siegel	Arrow McLaren	Chevrolet	1:07.1169
2	26	(United States) Colton Herta W	Andretti Global	Honda	1:07.1648
3	45	(United Kingdom) Louis Foster R	Rahal Letterman Lanigan Racing	Honda	1:07.2093
Practice 2 results

== Qualifying ==
Qualifying was held at 11:30 AM PT on April 12, 2025. Kyle Kirkwood qualified on pole position for the race, while his Andretti Global teammate Colton Herta qualified second. Championship leader Álex Palou qualified in third. A number of drivers suffered incidents during qualifying. The most significant incident came at the end of the Fast 12 session, when Christian Lundgaard slid wide at turn 9 and impacted the tire barriers. The incident brought out a red flag in the session, which, by IndyCar rules, forced Lundgaard to lose his fastest two laps that he had already set. Other incidents included Santino Ferrucci suffering damage during his group 1 qualifying session that forced him to pull off the course in to a run-off area, and Scott Dixon clipping the wall in his group 1 session, forcing him to abandon what would have been his fastest lap.

=== Qualifying classification ===
Pos	No.	Driver	Team	Engine	Time				Final grid
Pos	No.	Driver	Team	Engine	Round 1		Round 2	Round 3	Final grid
Pos	No.	Driver	Team	Engine	Group 1	Group 2	Round 2	Round 3	Final grid
1	27	(United States) Kyle Kirkwood **W**	Andretti Global	Honda	—N/a	1:06.9367	1:06.4219	**1:06.1921**	1
2	26	(United States) Colton Herta **W**	Andretti Global	Honda	1:07.2181	—N/a	1:06.5648	**1:06.4232**	2
3	10	(Spain) Álex Palou	Chip Ganassi Racing	Honda	—N/a	1:07.0031	**1:06.6076**	1:06.6254	3
4	60	(Sweden) Felix Rosenqvist	Meyer Shank Racing	Honda	1:07.3325	—N/a	1:06.9121	**1:06.6358**	4
5	28	(Sweden) Marcus Ericsson	Andretti Global	Honda	—N/a	1:07.2142	1:06.7172	**1:06.7061**	5
6	3	(New Zealand) Scott McLaughlin	Team Penske	Chevrolet	—N/a	1:07.1104	**1:06.7592**	1:07.0393	6
7	66	(New Zealand) Marcus Armstrong	Meyer Shank Racing	Honda	1:07.4324	—N/a	**1:06.9381**	—N/a	7
8	20	(United States) Alexander Rossi **W**	ECR	Chevrolet	—N/a	1:07.3304	**1:07.1989**	—N/a	8
9	5	(Mexico) Pato O'Ward	Arrow McLaren	Chevrolet	**1:07.3978**	—N/a	1:07.5540	—N/a	9
10	4	(United States) David Malukas	A. J. Foyt Racing	Chevrolet	**1:07.5468**	—N/a	1:07.9818	—N/a	10
11	6	(United States) Nolan Siegel	Arrow McLaren	Chevrolet	—N/a	**1:07.1909**	1:08.2861	—N/a	11
12	7	(Denmark) Christian Lundgaard	Arrow McLaren	Chevrolet	**1:07.2092**	—N/a	1:12.0583	—N/a	12
13	12	(Australia) Will Power **W**	Team Penske	Chevrolet	**1:07.6606**	—N/a	—N/a	—N/a	13
14	9	(New Zealand) Scott Dixon **W**	Chip Ganassi Racing	Honda	—N/a	**1:07.3777**	—N/a	—N/a	14
15	2	(United States) Josef Newgarden **W**	Team Penske	Chevrolet	**1:07.6905**	—N/a	—N/a	—N/a	15
16	15	(United States) Graham Rahal	Rahal Letterman Lanigan Racing	Honda	—N/a	**1:07.3806**	—N/a	—N/a	16
17	8	(Cayman Islands) Kyffin Simpson	Chip Ganassi Racing	Honda	**1:07.7026**	—N/a	—N/a	—N/a	17
18	21	(Denmark) Christian Rasmussen	ECR	Chevrolet	—N/a	**1:07.4664**	—N/a	—N/a	18
19	77	(United States) Sting Ray Robb	Juncos Hollinger Racing	Chevrolet	**1:07.7925**	—N/a	—N/a	—N/a	19
20	45	(United Kingdom) Louis Foster **R**	Rahal Letterman Lanigan Racing	Honda	—N/a	**1:07.5295**	—N/a	—N/a	20
21	76	(United States) Conor Daly	Juncos Hollinger Racing	Chevrolet	**1:07.9223**	—N/a	—N/a	—N/a	21
22	90	(United Kingdom) Callum Ilott	Prema Racing	Chevrolet	—N/a	**1:07.5890**	—N/a	—N/a	22
23	30	(Canada) Devlin DeFrancesco	Rahal Letterman Lanigan Racing	Honda	**1:08.0824**	—N/a	—N/a	—N/a	23
24	83	(Israel) Robert Shwartzman **R**	Prema Racing	Chevrolet	—N/a	**1:07.6606**	—N/a	—N/a	24
25	18	(Netherlands) Rinus VeeKay	Dale Coyne Racing	Honda	**1:08.2326**	—N/a	—N/a	—N/a	25
26	51	(United States) Jacob Abel **R**	Dale Coyne Racing	Honda	—N/a	**1:08.5051**	—N/a	—N/a	26
27	14	(United States) Santino Ferrucci	A. J. Foyt Racing	Chevrolet	**1:08.6268**	—N/a	—N/a	—N/a	27
Qualifying results

Notes

- **Bold text** indicates fastest time set in session.

== Warmup ==
Top Practice Speeds
Pos	No.	Driver	Team	Engine	Lap Time
1	15	(United States) Graham Rahal	Rahal Letterman Lanigan Racing	Honda	01:08.0151
2	2	(United States) Josef Newgarden W	Team Penske	Chevrolet	01:08.3474
3	66	(New Zealand) Marcus Armstrong	Meyer Shank Racing	Honda	01:08.4736
Warmup results

== Race ==
The race was held at 1:30 PM PT on April 13, 2025.

=== Race classification ===
Pos	No.	Driver	Team	Engine	Laps	Time/Retired	Pit Stops	Grid	Laps Led	Pts.
1	27	(United States) Kyle Kirkwood W	Andretti Global	Honda	90	1:45:51.2058	3	1	46	54
2	10	(Spain) Álex Palou	Chip Ganassi Racing	Honda	90	+2.6859	3	3	0	40
3	7	(Denmark) Christian Lundgaard	Arrow McLaren	Chevrolet	90	+18.7784	3	12	26	36
4	60	(Sweden) Felix Rosenqvist	Meyer Shank Racing	Honda	90	+19.8193	3	4	0	32
5	12	(Australia) Will Power W	Team Penske	Chevrolet	90	+23.3641	3	13	0	30
6	3	(New Zealand) Scott McLaughlin	Team Penske	Chevrolet	90	+25.7113	3	6	0	28
7	26	(United States) Colton Herta W	Andretti Global	Honda	90	+26.5802	3	2	0	26
8	9	(New Zealand) Scott Dixon W	Chip Ganassi Racing	Honda	90	+27.0975	3	14	2	25
9	77	(United States) Sting Ray Robb	Juncos Hollinger Racing	Chevrolet	90	+27.6913	3	19	12	23
10	8	(Cayman Islands) Kyffin Simpson	Chip Ganassi Racing	Honda	90	+28.1025	3	17	3	21
11	14	(United States) Santino Ferrucci	A. J. Foyt Racing	Chevrolet	90	+31.4467	3	27	0	19
12	28	(Sweden) Marcus Ericsson	Andretti Global	Honda	90	+32.1430	3	5	0	18
13	5	(Mexico) Pato O'Ward	Arrow McLaren	Chevrolet	90	+39.3900	3	9	0	17
14	66	(New Zealand) Marcus Armstrong	Meyer Shank Racing	Honda	90	+41.6832	3	7	1	17
15	20	(United States) Alexander Rossi W	ECR	Chevrolet	90	+42.7421	3	8	0	15
16	45	(United Kingdom) Louis Foster R	Rahal Letterman Lanigan Racing	Honda	90	+44.2727	3	20	0	14
17	4	(United States) David Malukas	A. J. Foyt Racing	Chevrolet	90	+47.0318	3	10	0	13
18	83	(Israel) Robert Shwartzman R	Prema Racing	Chevrolet	90	+49.6677	3	24	0	12
19	18	(Netherlands) Rinus VeeKay	Dale Coyne Racing	Honda	90	+57.6710	3	25	0	11
20	6	(United States) Nolan Siegel	Arrow McLaren	Chevrolet	90	+58.2876	3	11	0	10
21	90	(United Kingdom) Callum Ilott	Prema Racing	Chevrolet	89	+1 Lap	3	22	0	9
22	15	(United States) Graham Rahal	Rahal Letterman Lanigan Racing	Honda	89	+1 Lap	3	16	0	8
23	21	(Denmark) Christian Rasmussen	ECR	Chevrolet	89	+1 Lap	3	18	0	7
24	30	(Canada) Devlin DeFrancesco	Rahal Letterman Lanigan Racing	Honda	89	+1 Lap	3	23	0	6
25	76	(United States) Conor Daly	Juncos Hollinger Racing	Chevrolet	88	+2 Laps	3	21	0	5
26	51	(United States) Jacob Abel R	Dale Coyne Racing	Honda	88	+2 Laps	3	26	0	5
27	2	(United States) Josef Newgarden W	Team Penske	Chevrolet	88	+2 Laps	5	15	0	5
Fastest lap: (Cayman Islands) Kyffin Simpson (Chip Ganassi Racing) — 1:08.1355 (lap 32)
Official results

== Championship standings after the race ==
Drivers' Championship standings

	Pos.	Driver	Points
Unchanged	1	(Spain) Álex Palou	142
	2	(United States) Kyle Kirkwood	108 (–34)
	3	(Denmark) Christian Lundgaard	96 (–46)
	4	(Sweden) Felix Rosenqvist	88 (–54)
	5	(New Zealand) Scott Dixon	86 (–56)

Engine manufacturer standings

	Pos.	Manufacturer	Points
Unchanged	1	Honda	278
Unchanged	2	Chevrolet	209 (–69)

- Note: Only the top five positions are included.

Previous race: 2025 Thermal Club IndyCar Grand Prix	IndyCar Series; 2025 season	Next race: 2025 Children's of Alabama Indy Grand Prix
Previous race: 2024 Acura Grand Prix of Long Beach	Grand Prix of Long Beach	Next race: 2026 Acura Grand Prix of Long Beach
