= 2024 Children's of Alabama Indy Grand Prix =

(United States) 2024 Children's of Alabama Indy Grand Prix
Race details
3rd round of the 2024 IndyCar season
← Previous race	Next race →
- Layout of the Barber Motorsports Park
- Date: April 28, 2024
- Official name: Children's of Alabama Indy Grand Prix
- Location: Barber Motorsports Park, Birmingham, Alabama
- Course: Permanent road course 2.380 mi / 3.830 km
- Distance: 90 laps 214.200 mi / 344.700 km

Pole position
- Driver: (New Zealand) Scott McLaughlin (Team Penske)
- Time: 01:05.9490

Fastest lap
- Driver: (New Zealand) Scott McLaughlin (Team Penske)
- Time: 01:07.7544 (on lap 74 of 90)

Podium
- First: (New Zealand) Scott McLaughlin (Team Penske)
- Second: (Australia) Will Power (Team Penske)
- Third: (Sweden) Linus Lundqvist (Chip Ganassi Racing)

Chronology
Previous	Next
2023	2025

The 2024 Children's of Alabama Indy Grand Prix was the third round of the 2024 IndyCar season. The race was held on April 28, 2024, in Birmingham, Alabama at the Barber Motorsports Park. The race consisted of 90 laps and was won by Scott McLaughlin.

== Entry list ==
Key	Meaning
R	Rookie
W	Past winner

No.	Driver	Team	Engine
2	(United States) Josef Newgarden W	Team Penske	Chevrolet
3	(New Zealand) Scott McLaughlin W	Team Penske	Chevrolet
4	(Cayman Islands) Kyffin Simpson R	Chip Ganassi Racing	Honda
5	(Mexico) Pato O'Ward W	Arrow McLaren	Chevrolet
6	(France) Théo Pourchaire R	Arrow McLaren	Chevrolet
7	(United States) Alexander Rossi	Arrow McLaren	Chevrolet
8	(Sweden) Linus Lundqvist R	Chip Ganassi Racing	Honda
9	(New Zealand) Scott Dixon	Chip Ganassi Racing	Honda
10	(Spain) Álex Palou W	Chip Ganassi Racing	Honda
11	(New Zealand) Marcus Armstrong	Chip Ganassi Racing	Honda
12	(Australia) Will Power W	Team Penske	Chevrolet
14	(United States) Santino Ferrucci	A.J. Foyt Enterprises	Chevrolet
15	(United States) Graham Rahal	Rahal Letterman Lanigan Racing	Honda
18	(United Kingdom) Jack Harvey	Dale Coyne Racing	Honda
20	(Denmark) Christian Rasmussen R	Ed Carpenter Racing	Chevrolet
21	(Netherlands) Rinus VeeKay	Ed Carpenter Racing	Chevrolet
26	(United States) Colton Herta	Andretti Global with Curb-Agajanian	Honda
27	(United States) Kyle Kirkwood	Andretti Global	Honda
28	(Sweden) Marcus Ericsson	Andretti Global	Honda
30	(Brazil) Pietro Fittipaldi	Rahal Letterman Lanigan Racing	Honda
41	(United States) Sting Ray Robb	A.J. Foyt Enterprises	Chevrolet
45	(Denmark) Christian Lundgaard	Rahal Letterman Lanigan Racing	Honda
51	(Italy) Luca Ghiotto R	Dale Coyne Racing with Rick Ware Racing	Honda
60	(Sweden) Felix Rosenqvist	Meyer Shank Racing	Honda
66	(United Kingdom) Tom Blomqvist R	Meyer Shank Racing	Honda
77	(France) Romain Grosjean	Juncos Hollinger Racing	Chevrolet
78	(Argentina) Agustín Canapino	Juncos Hollinger Racing	Chevrolet

== Practice ==
=== Practice 1 ===
Top Practice Speeds
Pos	No.	Driver	Team	Engine	Lap Time
1	2	(United States) Josef Newgarden	Team Penske	Chevrolet	01:06.7045
2	5	(Mexico) Pato O'Ward W	Arrow McLaren	Chevrolet	01:06.7875
3	12	(Australia) Will Power W	Team Penske	Chevrolet	01:06.7914

=== Practice 2 ===
Top Practice Speeds
Pos	No.	Driver	Team	Engine	Lap Time
1	21	(Netherlands) Rinus Veekay	Ed Carpenter Racing	Chevrolet	01:06.5463
2	77	(France) Romain Grosjean	Juncos Hollinger Racing	Chevrolet	01:06.5819
3	3	(New Zealand) Scott McLaughlin W	Team Penske	Chevrolet	01:06.6099

== Qualifying ==
=== Qualifying classification ===
Pos	No.	Driver	Team	Engine	Time				Final grid
Pos	No.	Driver	Team	Engine	Round 1		Round 2	Round 3	Final grid
Pos	No.	Driver	Team	Engine	Group 1	Group 2	Round 2	Round 3	Final grid
1	3	(New Zealand) Scott McLaughlin **W**	Team Penske	Chevrolet	N/A	**01:05.8147**	01:05.9344	**01:05.9490**	1
2	12	(Australia) Will Power **W**	Team Penske	Chevrolet	N/A	01:06.0450	01:05.8765	01:06.0460	2
3	45	(Denmark) Christian Lundgaard	Rahal Letterman Lanigan Racing	Honda	N/A	01:06.2147	**01:05.8130**	01:06.0818	3
4	5	(Mexico) Pato O'Ward **W**	Arrow McLaren	Chevrolet	01:05.8193	N/A	01:06.0374	01:06.2940	4
5	60	(Sweden) Felix Rosenqvist	Meyer Shank Racing	Honda	N/A	01:06.2483	01:06.0418	01:06.4524	5
6	11	(New Zealand) Marcus Armstrong	Chip Ganassi Racing	Honda	01:05.9767	N/A	01:05.9593	01:06.9022	6
7	15	(United States) Graham Rahal	Rahal Letterman Lanigan Racing	Honda	01:05.9948	N/A	01:06.0942	N/A	7
8	2	(United States) Josef Newgarden **W**	Team Penske	Chevrolet	N/A	01:06.1385	01:06.2908	N/A	8
9	27	(United States) Kyle Kirkwood	Andretti Global	Honda	01:06.0350	N/A	01:06.2959	N/A	9
10	10	(Spain) Álex Palou **W**	Chip Ganassi Racing	Honda	**01:05.5862**	N/A	01:06.3013	N/A	10
11	77	(France) Romain Grosjean	Juncos Hollinger Racing	Chevrolet	01:06.0343	N/A	01:06.3526	N/A	11
12	66	(United Kingdom) Tom Blomqvist **R**	Meyer Shank Racing	Honda	N/A	01:06.4519	01:06.3871	N/A	12
13	9	(New Zealand) Scott Dixon	Chip Ganassi Racing	Honda	01:06.1425	N/A	N/A	N/A	13
14	20	(Denmark) Christian Rasmussen **R**	Ed Carpenter Racing	Chevrolet	N/A	01:06.4803	N/A	N/A	14
15	26	(United States) Colton Herta	Andretti Global with Curb-Agajanian	Honda	01:06.1481	N/A	N/A	N/A	15
16	7	(United States) Alexander Rossi	Arrow McLaren	Chevrolet	N/A	01:06.5054	N/A	N/A	16
17	14	(United States) Santino Ferrucci	A. J. Foyt Racing	Chevrolet	01:06.2751	N/A	N/A	N/A	17
18	28	(Sweden) Marcus Ericsson	Andretti Global	Honda	N/A	01:06.5846	N/A	N/A	18
19	8	(Sweden) Linus Lundqvist **R**	Chip Ganassi Racing	Honda	01:06.2825	N/A	N/A	N/A	19
20	78	(Argentina) Agustín Canapino	Juncos Hollinger Racing	Chevrolet	N/A	01:06.6706	N/A	N/A	20
21	51	(Italy) Luca Ghiotto **R**	Dale Coyne Racing with Rick Ware Racing	Honda	01:06.4788	N/A	N/A	N/A	21
22	18	(United Kingdom) Jack Harvey	Dale Coyne Racing	Honda	N/A	01:06.7969	N/A	N/A	22
23	4	(Cayman Islands) Kyffin Simpson **R**	Chip Ganassi Racing	Honda	01:06.5267	N/A	N/A	N/A	23
24	6	(France) Théo Pourchaire **R**	Arrow McLaren	Chevrolet	N/A	01:06.9052	N/A	N/A	24
25	41	(United States) Sting Ray Robb	A. J. Foyt Racing	Chevrolet	01:06.8404	N/A	N/A	N/A	25
26	30	(Brazil) Pietro Fittipaldi	Rahal Letterman Lanigan Racing	Honda	N/A	01:07.4920	N/A	N/A	26
27	21	(Netherlands) Rinus VeeKay	Ed Carpenter Racing	Chevrolet	N/A	01:07.7392	N/A	N/A	27

Notes

- **Bold text** indicates fastest time set in session.

== Warmup ==
Top Practice Speeds
Pos	No.	Driver	Team	Engine	Lap Time
1	10	(Spain) Álex Palou	Chip Ganassi Racing	Honda	01:06.3195
2	60	(Sweden) Felix Rosenqvist	Meyer Shank Racing	Honda	01:06.8069
3	2	(United States) Josef Newgarden	Team Penske	Chevrolet	01:06.8787

== Race ==
The race started at 1:30 PM ET on April 28, 2024.

=== Race classification ===
Pos	No.	Driver	Team	Engine	Laps	Time/Retired	Pit Stops	Grid	Laps Led	Pts.
1	3	(New Zealand) Scott McLaughlin W	Team Penske	Chevrolet	90	1:56:45.7773	3	1	58	54
2	12	(Australia) Will Power W	Team Penske	Chevrolet	90	+1.3194	3	2	1	41
3	8	(Sweden) Linus Lundqvist R	Chip Ganassi Racing	Honda	90	+2.4421	3	19	4	36
4	60	(Sweden) Felix Rosenqvist	Meyer Shank Racing	Honda	90	+4.5109	2	5	1	33
5	10	(Spain) Álex Palou W	Chip Ganassi Racing	Honda	90	+5.3692	2	10	12	31
6	45	(Denmark) Christian Lundgaard	Rahal Letterman Lanigan Racing	Honda	90	+6.0509	3	3		28
7	14	(United States) Santino Ferrucci	A. J. Foyt Racing	Chevrolet	90	+6.6055	3	17	14	27
8	26	(United States) Colton Herta	Andretti Global with Curb-Agajanian	Honda	90	+7.5124	2	15		24
9	11	(New Zealand) Marcus Armstrong	Chip Ganassi Racing	Honda	90	+8.0375	2	6		22
10	27	(United States) Kyle Kirkwood	Andretti Global	Honda	90	+8.5573	2	9		20
11	15	(United States) Graham Rahal	Rahal Letterman Lanigan Racing	Honda	90	+9.0288	2	7		19
12	77	(France) Romain Grosjean	Juncos Hollinger Racing	Chevrolet	90	+9.4495	2	11		18
13	18	(United Kingdom) Jack Harvey	Dale Coyne Racing	Honda	90	+10.1269	4	22		17
14	4	(Cayman Islands) Kyffin Simpson R	Chip Ganassi Racing	Honda	90	+10.4415	3	23		16
15	9	(New Zealand) Scott Dixon	Chip Ganassi Racing	Honda	90	+11.3628	3	13		15
16	2	(United States) Josef Newgarden W	Team Penske	Chevrolet	90	+12.2355	3	8		14
17	21	(Netherlands) Rinus VeeKay	Ed Carpenter Racing	Chevrolet	90	+13.5092	4	27		13
18	28	(Sweden) Marcus Ericsson	Andretti Global	Honda	90	+13.8437	2	18		12
19	66	(United Kingdom) Tom Blomqvist R	Meyer Shank Racing	Honda	90	+14.5751	3	12		11
20	78	(Argentina) Agustín Canapino	Juncos Hollinger Racing	Chevrolet	90	+14.6807	3	20		10
21	51	(Italy) Luca Ghiotto R	Dale Coyne Racing with Rick Ware Racing	Honda	90	+15.6809	4	21		9
22	6	(France) Théo Pourchaire R	Arrow McLaren	Chevrolet	89	+1 Lap	3	24		8
23	5	(Mexico) Pato O'Ward W	Arrow McLaren	Chevrolet	90	+16.4461	4	4		7
24	20	(Denmark) Christian Rasmussen R	Ed Carpenter Racing	Chevrolet	89	+1 Lap	3	14		6
25	7	(United States) Alexander Rossi	Arrow McLaren	Chevrolet	60	Mechanical	2	16		5
26	41	(United States) Sting Ray Robb	A. J. Foyt Racing	Chevrolet	54	Contact	2	25		5
27	30	(Brazil) Pietro Fittipaldi	Rahal Letterman Lanigan Racing	Honda	42	Contact	2	26		5
Fastest lap: (New Zealand) Scott McLaughlin (Team Penske) – 01:07.7544 (lap 74)

== Championship standings after the race ==
Drivers' Championship standings

Pos.	Driver	Points
1	(United States) Colton Herta	101
2	(Australia) Will Power	100 (-1)
3	(Spain) Álex Palou	98 (-3)
4	(New Zealand) Scott Dixon	94 (-7)
5	(Sweden) Felix Rosenqvist	87 (-14)

Engine manufacturer standings

Pos.	Manufacturer	Points
1	(United States) Chevrolet	242
2	(Japan) Honda	230

- Note: Only the top five positions are included.

Previous race: 2024 Acura Grand Prix of Long Beach	IndyCar Series; 2024 season	Next race: 2024 Sonsio Grand Prix
Previous race: 2023 Children's of Alabama Indy Grand Prix	Children's of Alabama Indy Grand Prix	Next race: 2025 Children's of Alabama Indy Grand Prix
