= Christian Rasmussen (racing driver) =

Danish racing driver (born 2000)

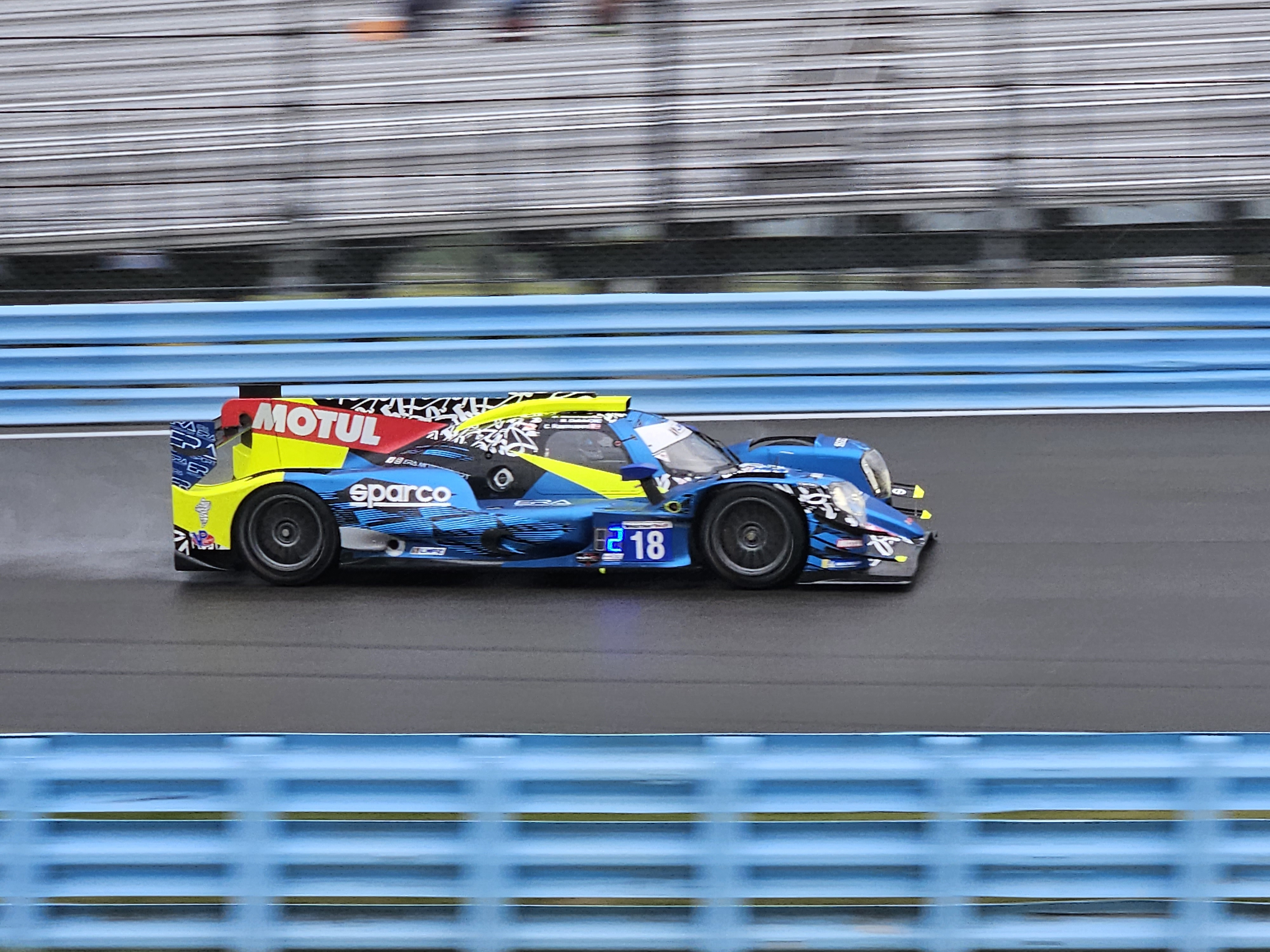
- Rasmussen's No. 18 car at the Watkins Glen International in 2023
- Nationality: (Denmark) Danish
- Born: Hans Christian Rhod Rasmussen; 29 June 2000 (age 26) Copenhagen, Denmark
- Categorisation: FIA Silver (until 2023); FIA Gold (2024–)

IndyCar Series career
- 43 races run over 3 years
- Team: No. 21 (Ed Carpenter Racing)
- Best finish: 13th (2025)
- First race: 2024 Grand Prix of St. Petersburg (St. Petersburg)
- Last race: 2026 Mission Grand Prix of Monterey (Laguna Seca)
- First win: 2025 Snap-on Milwaukee Mile 250 (Milwaukee)
Wins	Podiums	Poles
1	3	0

Previous series
- 2022-23 2021 2019-20 2018 2017 2016: Indy NXT; Indy Pro 2000 Championship; U.S. F2000 National Championship; Formula 4 United States Championship; F4 Danish Championship; Danish Formula Ford Championship

Championship titles
- 2023 2021 2020: Indy NXT; Indy Pro 2000 Championship; U.S. F2000 National Championship

Hans Christian Rhod Rasmussen (Danish pronunciation: [ˈkʰʁestjæn ˈʁɑsmusn̩, ˈkʰʁæs-]; born 29 June 2000) is a Danish race car driver from Copenhagen. He currently drives full-time for Ed Carpenter Racing in the IndyCar Series, driving the No. 21 Chevrolet–Dallara.

== Career ==
In 2016, Rasmussen competed in the Danish Formula Ford Championship for Frederichsen Sport, where he finished runner-up in the standings with five wins and fifteen podium finishes. Afterwards, he moved up to the F4 Danish Championship, where he drove for the Magnussen Racing Experience, where he third in the standings after winning two races and finishing on the podium twelve times.

In 2018, Rasmussen moved to the United States to compete in the Formula 4 United States Championship, joining Jay Howard's Motorsports Driver Development. He finished third in the points after winning five races and finishing on the podium eight times.

In 2019, Rasmussen remained with the now renamed Jay Howard Driver Development and went on to compete in the U.S. F2000 National Championship, where he finished third in the points after winning three races. He remained in the series the following year, where he won the championship, winning over half of all races and clinching the championship title at New Jersey Motorsports Park, two races before the end of the season. Across the year, he won nine races, including the first six races of the year, winning eight poles and finished on the podium ten times.

In 2021, Rasmussen remained with Jay Howard Driver Development and went on to compete in the Indy Pro 2000 Championship, where he won the championship after winning seven races, earning two poles and getting twelve podium finishes.

On 6 December 2021, it was announced that Rasmussen would compete in Indy Lights for Andretti Autosport in 2022. He finished sixth in the final points standings after winning two races at Road America and Laguna Seca. In 2023, he remained in the now renamed Indy NXT, this time driving for HMD Motorsports with Dale Coyne Racing, where he won the championship after winning five races, earning five poles and getting eight podium finishes.

== IndyCar Series ==
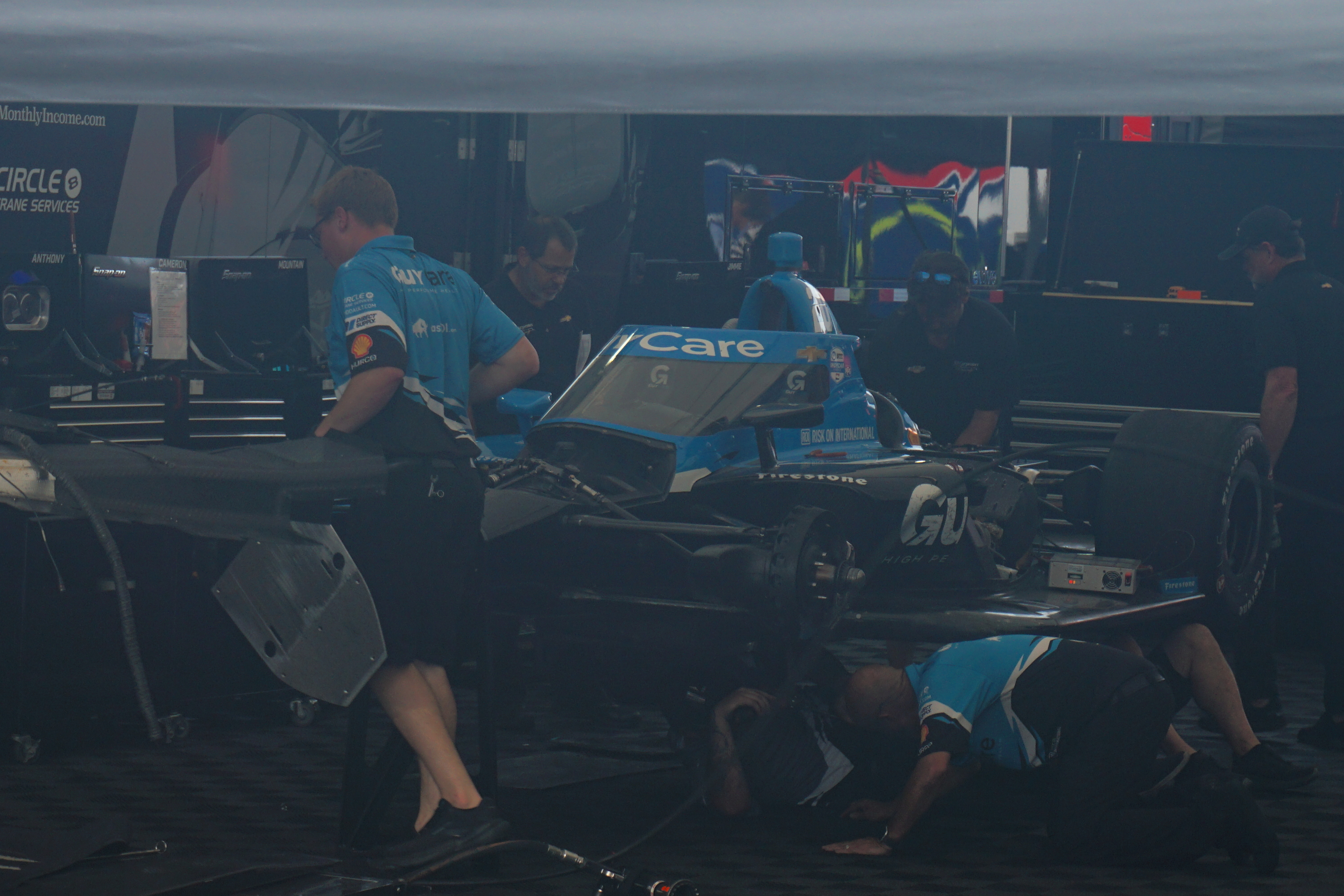
Rasmussen's car in the garage at the 2024 Hy-Vee Milwaukee Mile 250s

On 25 October 2023, it was announced that Rasmussen would drive a partial schedule for Ed Carpenter Racing (ECR) in the team's No. 20 entry in 2024, including the Indianapolis 500, where he would drive a third entry for the team. He earned a best finish of eighth at Mid-Ohio and finished 22nd in the final points standings.

For 2025, Rasmussen signed a contract with ECR. He won his first career IndyCar victory at the Milwaukee Mile on 24 August 2025.

Rasmussen remained with Ed Carpenter Racing for 2026 season. In June it was announced that Christian will stay with ECR on multiyear deal.

== Karting record ==
=== Karting career summary ===
Season	Series	Team	Position
2014	NEZ Cup — KFJ		20th
2014	Danish Championship — KFJ		17th
2015	NEZ Championship — KFJ		3rd
2015	Danish Championship — KFJ		3rd
2015	Andrea Margutti Trophy — KFJ	RS Competition	21st

== Racing record ==
=== Career summary ===
Season	Series	Team	Races	Wins	Poles	F/Laps	Podiums	Points	Position
2016	Danish Formula Ford Championship	Frederichsen Sport	20	5	0	4	15	332	**2nd**
2017	F4 Danish Championship	Magnussen Racing Experience	21	2	1	3	12	292	**3rd**
2018	Formula 4 United States Championship	Jay Howard's Motorsports Driver Development	17	5	1	4	8	196	**3rd**
2019	U.S. F2000 National Championship	Jay Howard Driver Development	15	3	1	4	7	282	**3rd**
2020	U.S. F2000 National Championship	Jay Howard Driver Development	17	9	8	7	10	394	**1st**
2021	Indy Pro 2000 Championship	Jay Howard Driver Development	18	7	2	8	12	445	**1st**
2022	Indy Lights	Andretti Autosport	14	2	1	2	5	440	6th
2022	IMSA SportsCar Championship - LMP2	Era Motorsport	1	0	0	0	0	285	19th
2023	Indy NXT	HMD Motorsports with Dale Coyne Racing	14	5	5	5	8	539	**1st**
2023	IMSA SportsCar Championship - LMP2	Era Motorsport	4	0	0	1	2	926	11th
2024	IndyCar Series	Ed Carpenter Racing	14	0	0	0	0	163	22nd
2024	IMSA SportsCar Championship - LMP2	Era Motorsport	1	1	0	0	1	370	37th
2025	IndyCar Series	Ed Carpenter Racing	17	1	0	0	2	313	13th
2025	IMSA SportsCar Championship - LMP2	AO Racing	1	0	0	0	0	285	46th
2026	IndyCar Series	Ed Carpenter Racing	18	0	0	0	1	245	21st
2026	IMSA SportsCar Championship - LMP2	AO Racing	1	0	0	0	0	666	26th
2026	IMSA SportsCar Championship - LMP2	Era Motorsport	1	1	0	0	1	666	26th

^{*} Season still in progress.

=== Complete F4 Danish Championship results ===
(key) (Races in bold indicate pole position) (Races in italics indicate fastest lap)

Year	Team	1	2	3	4	5	6	7	8	9	10	11	12	13	14	15	16	17	18	19	20	21	Pos	Points
2017	Magnussen Racing Experience	JYL1; 1; 5	JYL1; 2; 4	JYL1; 3; 3	DJU1; 1; 3	DJU1; 2; 2	DJU1; 3 Ret	PAD1; 1; 3	PAD1; 2; 9	PAD1; 3; 7	JYL2; 1; 3	JYL2; 2; 3	JYL2; 3; 1	PAD2; 1; 4	PAD2; 2; 7	PAD2; 3; 4	DJU2; 1; 4	DJU2; 2; 5	DJU2; 3; 3	JYL3; 1; 2	JYL3; 2; 3	**JYL3**; **3**; 1	3rd	292

=== Complete Formula 4 United States Championship results ===
(key) (Races in bold indicate pole position) (Races in italics indicate fastest lap)

Year	Entrant	1	2	3	4	5	6	7	8	9	10	11	12	13	14	15	16	17	DC	Points
2018	Jay Howard's Motorsports Driver Development	VIR; 1; 2	VIR; 2; 1	VIR; 3; 1	**ROA**; **1** Ret	ROA; 2; 12	ROA; 3; 17	MOH; 1; 2	MOH; 2; 1	MOH; 3; 1	PIT; 1; 5	PIT; 2; 24	PIT; 3; 9	NJMP; 1; 9	NJMP; 2; 9	NJMP; 3; 10	COTA; 1; 2	COTA; 2; 1	3rd	196

=== American open–wheel racing results ===
==== U.S. F2000 National Championship ====
Year	Team	1	2	3	4	5	6	7	8	9	10	11	12	13	14	15	16	17	Rank	Points
2019	Jay Howard Driver Development	STP; 4	STP; 15	IMS; 20	IMS; 8	LOR; 6	ROA; 17	ROA; 5	**TOR**; 2	TOR; 1	MOH; 1	MOH; 2	POR; 3	POR; 17	LAG; 1	LAG; 2			3rd	282
2020	Jay Howard Driver Development	**ROA**; 1	**ROA**; 1	MOH; 1	**MOH**; 1	**MOH**; 1	**LOR**; 1	IMS; 6	IMS; 5	IMS; 21	**MOH**; 14	MOH; 20	**MOH**; 1	NJM; 2	**NJM**; 1	NJM; 1	STP; 19	STP; 5	1st	394

==== Indy Pro 2000 Championship ====
Year	Team	1	2	3	4	5	6	7	8	9	10	11	12	13	14	15	16	17	18	Rank	Points
2021	Jay Howard Driver Development	ALA; 13	**ALA**; 2	STP; 2	STP; 1	IMS; 1	IMS; 9	IMS; 1	LOR; 1	ROA; 10	ROA; 1	**MOH**; 1	MOH; 5	GMP; 2	NJM; 3	NJM; 9	NJM; 9	MOH; 1	MOH; 3	1st	445

==== Indy Lights/Indy NXT ====
(key) (Races in bold indicate pole position) (Races in italics indicate fastest lap) (Races with ^{L} indicate a race lap led) (Races with * indicate most race laps led)

Year	Team	1	2	3	4	5	6	7	8	9	10	11	12	13	14	Rank	Points
2022	Andretti Autosport	STP; 12^{L}*	ALA; 11	IMS; 4^{L}	IMS; 2	DET; 13	DET; 13	RDA; 1^{L}*	MOH; 4	IOW; 2	NSH; 5	GTW; 12	POR; 7	LAG; 2	**LAG**; 1^{L}*	6th	440
2023	HMD Motorsports with Dale Coyne Racing	STP; 4	**BAR**; 1^{L*}	IMS; 5	DET; 9	DET; 2	RDA; 19	**MOH**; 3^{L*}	IOW; 1^{L*}	**NSH**; 1^{L*}	IMS; 6	**GMP**; 1^{L*}	POR; 5	LAG; 2	**LAG**; 1^{L*}	1st	539

==== IndyCar Series ====
(key) (Races in bold indicate pole position; races in italics indicate fastest lap)

Year	Team	No.	Chassis	Engine	1	2	3	4	5	6	7	8	9	10	11	12	13	14	15	16	17	18	Rank	Points	Ref
2024	Ed Carpenter Racing	20	Dallara DW12	Chevrolet	STP; 19	THE; DNQ	LBH; 27	ALA; 24	IMS; 20		DET; 27	ROA; 20	LAG; 13	MOH; 9	IOW	IOW	TOR; 27	GTW	POR; 26	MIL; 11	MIL; 16	NSH; 14	22nd	163	
2024	Ed Carpenter Racing	33	Dallara DW12	Chevrolet						INDY; 12													22nd	163	
2025	Ed Carpenter Racing	21	Dallara DW12	Chevrolet	STP; 15	THE; 12	LBH; 23	ALA; 15	IMS; 19	INDY; 6	DET; 24	GTW; 3	ROA; 18	MOH; 25	IOW; 6	IOW; 8	TOR; 20	LAG; 9	POR; 12	MIL; 1	NSH; 27		13th	313	
2026	Ed Carpenter Racing	21	Dallara DW12	Chevrolet	STP; 19	PHX; 14	ARL; 25	ALA; 19	LBH; 15	IMS; 24	INDY; 27	DET; 25	GTW; 3	ROA; 25	MOH; 7	NSH; 22	POR; 24	MRK; 23	WSH; 14	MIL; 5	MIL; 8	LAG; 21	21st	245	

==== Indianapolis 500 ====
Year	Chassis	Engine	Start	Finish	Team
2024	Dallara DW12	Chevrolet	24	12	Ed Carpenter Racing
2025	Dallara DW12	Chevrolet	18	6	Ed Carpenter Racing
2026	Dallara DW12	Chevrolet	15	27	Ed Carpenter Racing

=== Complete IMSA SportsCar Championship results ===
(key)(Races in bold indicate pole position. Races in italics indicate fastest race lap in class. Results are overall/class)

Year	Team	Class	Make	Engine	1	2	3	4	5	6	7	Rank	Points
2022	Era Motorsport	LMP2	Oreca 07	Gibson GK428 4.2 L V8	DAY	SEB	LGA	MOH	WGL	ELK	PET; 5	19th	285
2023	Era Motorsport	LMP2	Oreca 07	Gibson GK428 4.2 L V8	DAY; 9†	SEB; 3	LGA	WGL; 2	ELK	IMS	PET; 5	11th	926
2024	Era Motorsport	LMP2	Oreca 07	Gibson GK428 4.2 L V8	DAY; 1	SEB	WGL	MOS	ELK	IMS	PET	37th	370
2025	AO Racing	LMP2	Oreca 07	Gibson GK428 4.2 L V8	DAY; 5	SEB	WGL	MOS	ELK	IMS	PET	46th	285
2026	AO Racing	LMP2	Oreca 07	Gibson GK428 4.2 L V8	DAY; 5	SEB	WGL	MOS	ELK			26th	666
2026	Era Motorsport	LMP2	Oreca 07	Gibson GK428 4.2 L V8						IMS; 1	PET	26th	666

^{†} Points only counted towards the Michelin Endurance Cup, and not the overall LMP2 Championship.

Sporting positions
Preceded by Braden Eves	U.S. F2000 National Championship; Champion; 2020	Succeeded by Kiko Porto
Preceded by Sting Ray Robb	Indy Pro 2000 Championship; Champion; 2021	Succeeded by Louis Foster
Preceded by Linus Lundqvist (Indy Lights)	Indy NXT; Champion; 2023	Succeeded by Incumbent
