= Nolan Siegel =

American racing driver (born 2004)

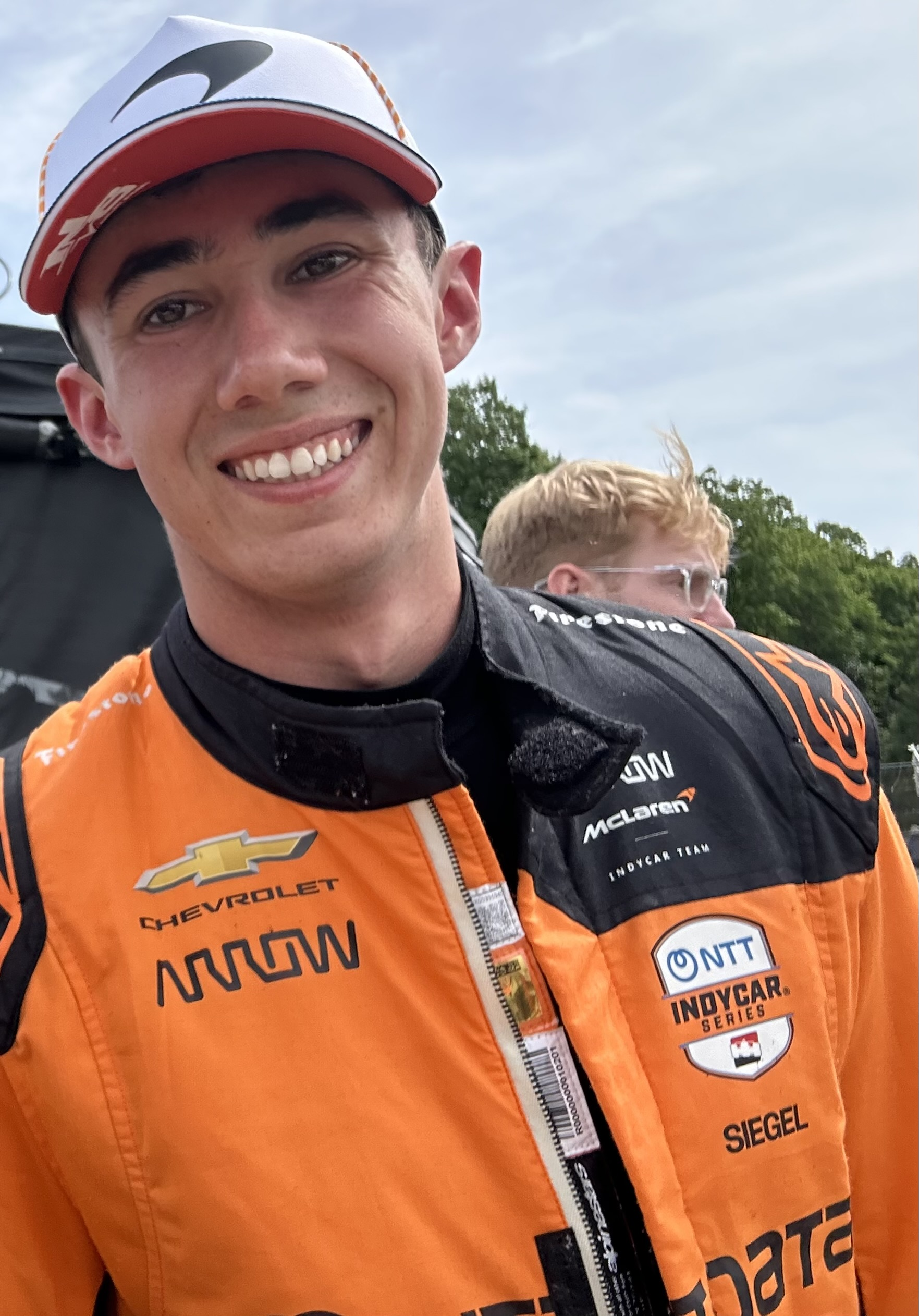
- Siegel at Road America in 2026
- Nationality: (United States) American
- Born: Nolan Reid Siegel; November 8, 2004 (age 22) Palo Alto, California, U.S.
- Categorisation: FIA Silver (until 2023); FIA Gold (2024–)

IndyCar Series career
- 37 races run over 3 years
- Team: No. 6 (Arrow McLaren)
- Best finish: 20th (2026)
- First race: 2024 Acura Grand Prix of Long Beach (Long Beach)
- Last race: 2026 Mission Grand Prix of Monterey (Laguna Seca)
Wins	Podiums	Poles
0	0	0

24 Hours of Le Mans career
- Years: 2024
- Teams: United Autosports
- Best finish: 15th (2024)
- Class wins: 1 (2024)

Previous series
- 2022–2024; 2022; 2021; 2019–2021; 2019–2020: Indy Lights; Indy Pro 2000; Michelin Pilot; U.S. F2000; F4 US

Nolan Reid Siegel (born November 8, 2004) is an American racing driver. He most recently competed in the IndyCar Series driving the No. 6 Chevrolet for Arrow McLaren. In 2024, Siegel won the 24 Hours of Le Mans in the LMP2 class on his first attempt, with United Autosports.

== Early career ==
=== Formula 4 United States Championship ===
Siegel would join the final round of the 2019 Formula 4 United States Championship held at Circuit of the Americas driving for Jay Howard Driver Development. He finished in the top-ten in both races.

Siegel would return to the championship for the first two rounds of the 2020 season once again driving for Jay Howard Driver Development. He would have a best finish of sixth in his final race.

=== USF2000 Championship ===
On February 13, 2019, it was announced Siegel would compete full-time in the 2019 U.S. F2000 National Championship for Newman Wachs Racing. He would finish fifteenth in the championship.

Siegel returned to the championship in 2020 and switched teams to drive for Jay Howard Driver Development. He took two podiums at Mid-Ohio and finished 13th in the standings.

In January 2021, it was announced Siegel would return for a third season in 2021 driving for DEForce Racing. He would get his first win in the third race held at New Jersey Motorsports Park. He would finish the season eighth in the standings.

=== Indy Pro 2000 ===
During 2021, Siegel would make his Indy Pro 2000 debut at Gateway Motorsports Park driving for DEForce Racing. He would impress by finishing fifth.

DEForce Racing announced Siegel would move up to the series full-time in 2022. At the first round held at St. Petersburg, he would take his maiden win by beating competitor Louis Foster on a late restart. Siegel would dominate the second race held at Barber Motorsports Park starting from pole and leading the race from start to finish. Ultimately, he would end up finishing fourth in the championship due to inconsistency during the middle and latter stages of the season.

=== Indy NXT ===
On September 8, 2022, it was announced Siegel would make his Indy Lights debut at final round held at Laguna Seca driving for HMD Motorsports with Dale Coyne Racing.

Siegel announced in October 2022 he would make the jump up to Indy NXT full-time for 2023, remaining at HMD Motorsports with Dale Coyne Racing. He would finish the season third in points, having won two races and scored a total of five podiums. With this, he also became the season's top rookie.

For the 2024 season, Siegel and HMD reunited for a title assault. At the opening round in St. Petersburg, the Californian scored pole and started out his season with a lights-to-flag victory.

== Sportscar racing career ==
In 2023, Siegel took part in the LMP2 class of the Asian Le Mans Series, driving for Inter Europol Competition. Partnering Charles Crews and Christian Bogle, Siegel managed to impress, leading his team to victory at Dubai by passing Charlie Eastwood in the final stint, though two retirements in the four-round season meant a lowly fifth place in the standings. He competed in various other sportscar races throughout the year, notably winning two LMP2 class races in the IMSA SportsCar Championship.

For 2024, Siegel would make his debut at the 24 Hours of Le Mans, pairing up with Oliver Jarvis and Bijoy Garg at United Autosports.

== IndyCar ==
=== Part-time commitments (2024) ===
Siegel's first IndyCar test came in January 2024, for Dale Coyne Racing at the Homestead-Miami Speedway.

On March 5, 2024, it was announced Siegel would compete part-time in the No. 18 Honda entry for Dale Coyne Racing, sharing his seat with Jack Harvey. Siegel would partake in the four events which do not clash with his Indy NXT commitments, including the Indianapolis 500. However, Nolan failed to qualify for the Indy 500 after crashing during his final qualifying attempt.

On June 7, 2024, it was announced that Siegel would substitute for Agustín Canapino at the upcoming race at Road America following abuse on social media directed at Théo Pourchaire after the two made contact during the Detroit Grand Prix a week prior, with Canapino having taken a "leave of absence".

=== Arrow McLaren (2024–2026) ===
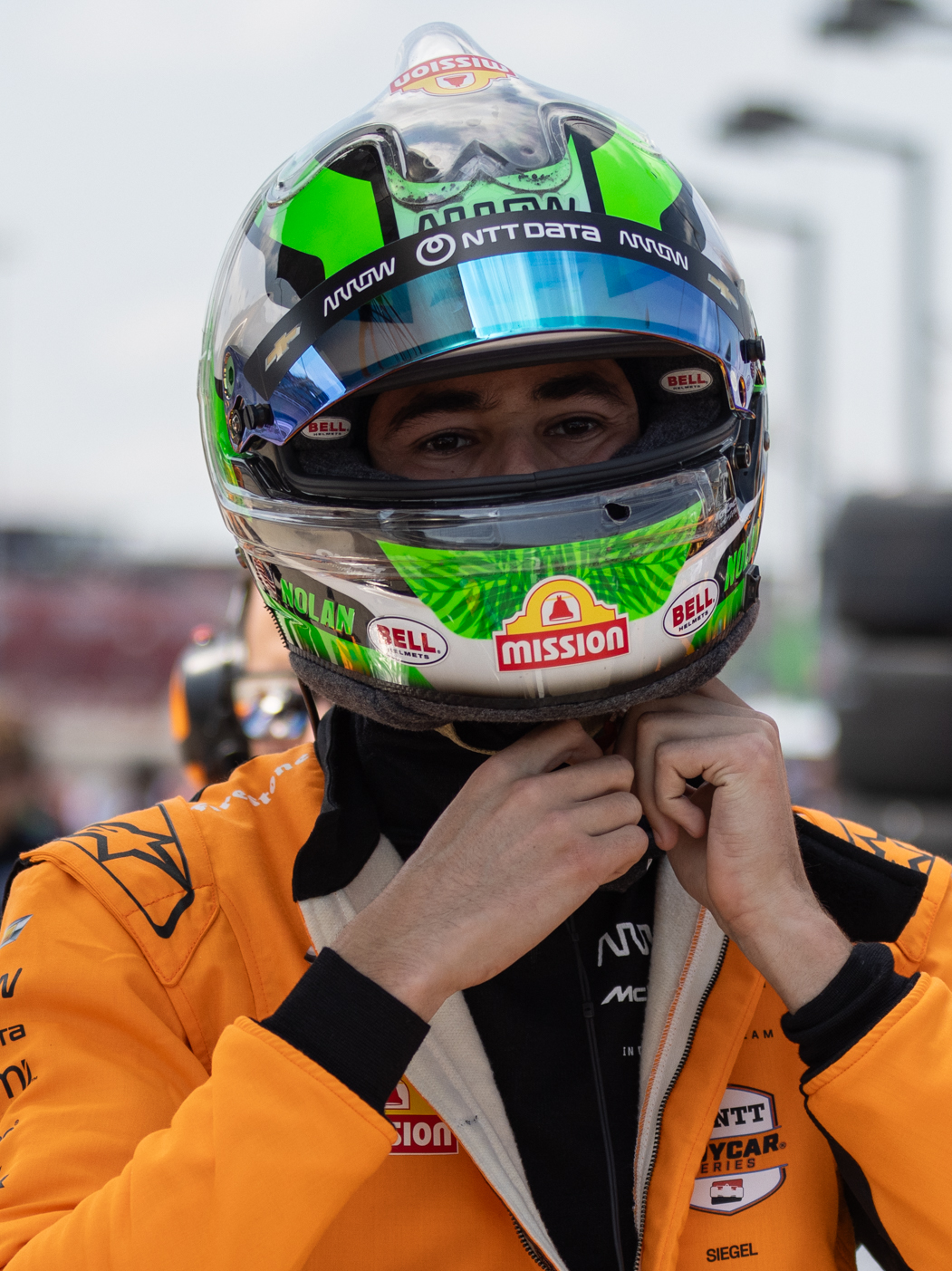
Siegel at the 2024 Hy-Vee Homefront 250

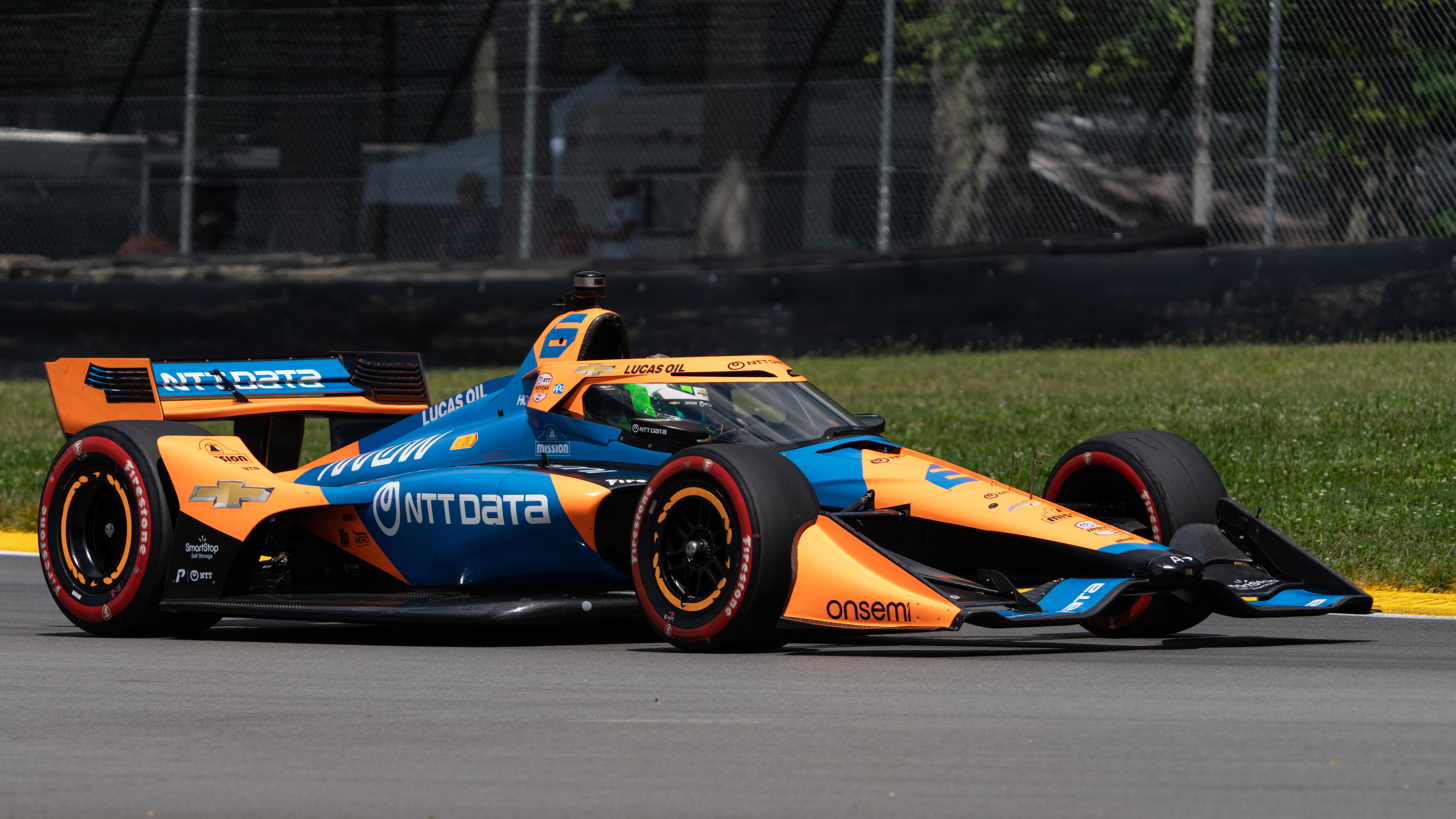
Siegel's 2024 Arrow McLaren IndyCar

On June 18, 2024, it was announced that Pourchaire had been dropped by the Arrow McLaren team, with the team signing Siegel in his place. Siegel made his debut with the team at the Monterey Grand Prix, where he struggled throughout the weekend, running in 26th at one point after spinning into the gravel; he took advantage of numerous driver errors to finish in twelfth.

In July 2026, it was announced that Siegel would be leaving the team at the end of the season.

== Personal life ==
In addition to racing, Siegel earned a pilot's license during his time living in Indianapolis, citing convenience for travel to Midwest race events and a personal interest in flying.

Siegel was admitted to Stanford University but deferred enrollment to pursue his professional racing career.

== Racing record ==
=== Career summary ===
Season	Series	Team	Races	Wins	Poles	F/Laps	Podiums	Points	Position
2019	Formula 4 United States Championship	Jay Howard Driver Development	2	0	0	0	0	7	24th
2019	U.S. F2000 National Championship	Newman Wachs Racing	15	0	0	0	0	113	15th
2019-20	NACAM Formula 4 Championship	Scuderia Martiga EG	9	0	0	0	1	60	11st
2020	Formula 4 United States Championship	Jay Howard Driver Development	5	0	0	0	0	8	21st
2020	U.S. F2000 National Championship	Jay Howard Driver Development	17	0	0	1	2	158	13rd
2021	Indy Pro 2000 Championship	DEForce Racing	1	0	0	0	0	26	18th
2021	U.S. F2000 National Championship	DEForce Racing	18	1	1	2	4	227	8th
2021	Michelin Pilot Challenge - GS	CarBahn Motorsports with Peregrine Racing	3	0	0	0	0	580	35th
2022	IMSA SportsCar Championship - LMP3	Mühlner Motorsports America	1	0	0	0	0	618	22nd
2022	IMSA SportsCar Championship - LMP3	Jr III Motorsports	2	0	0	0	1	618	22nd
2022	Indy Pro 2000 Championship	DEForce Racing	18	2	2	1	6	333	4th
2022	Indy Lights	HMD Motorsports with Dale Coyne Racing	2	0	0	0	0	42	17th
2022	IMSA Prototype Challenge	Jr III Racing	1	0	0	1	0	220	33rd
2023	Asian Le Mans Series - LMP2	Inter Europol Competition	4	1	0	0	1	39	5th
2023	Indy NXT	HMD Motorsports with Dale Coyne Racing	14	2	0	2	5	415	**3rd**
2023	IMSA SportsCar Championship - LMP2	CrowdStrike Racing by APR	3	2	0	0	2	1016	8th
2023	IMSA SportsCar Championship - LMP3	Sean Creech Motorsport	1	0	0	1	1	332	25th
2023	IMSA SportsCar Championship - LMP3	Jr III Motorsports	1	0	0	0	1	332	25th
2023	Michelin Pilot Challenge - GS	CarBahn with Peregrine Racing	2	0	0	0	0	260	44th
2023	GT World Challenge America - Pro-Am	CrowdStrike Racing by Riley Motorsports	1	1	0	0	1	0	NC
2023	Intercontinental GT Challenge	CrowdStrike Racing by Riley Motorsports	1	0	0	0	0	10	24th
2024	IndyCar Series	Dale Coyne Racing	1	0	0	0	0	154	23rd
2024	IndyCar Series	Juncos Hollinger Racing	1	0	0	0	0	154	23rd
2024	IndyCar Series	Arrow McLaren	10	0	0	0	0	154	23rd
2024	Indy NXT	HMD Motorsports	5	1	1	0	3	177	17th
2024	IMSA SportsCar Championship - LMP2	Sean Creech Motorsport	1	0	0	0	0	239	53rd
2024	24 Hours of Le Mans - LMP2	United Autosports	1	1	0	0	1	N/A	**1st**
2025	IndyCar Series	Arrow McLaren	16	0	0	0	0	213	22nd
2025	Le Mans Cup - LMP3	Inter Europol Competition	1	0	0	0	0	0	NC†
2025-26	Asian Le Mans Series - LMP2	Inter Europol Competition	6	0	0	0	1	20	13rd
2026	IndyCar Series	Arrow McLaren	18	0	0	0	0	259	20th
2026	IMSA SportsCar Championship - LMP2	Inter Europol Competition	1	0	0	0	1	325	33rd

=== American open-wheel racing results ===
==== U.S. F2000 National Championship ====
(key) (Races in bold indicate pole position) (Races in italics indicate fastest lap) (Races with * indicate most race laps led)

Year	Team	1	2	3	4	5	6	7	8	9	10	11	12	13	14	15	16	17	18	Rank	Points
2019	Newman Wachs Racing	STP; 1; 14	STP; 2; 12	IMS; 1; 15	IMS; 2; 14	LOR; 10	ROA; 1; 10	ROA; 2; 14	TOR; 1; 16	TOR; 2; 10	MOH; 1; 16	MOH; 2; 17	POR; 1; 17	POR; 2; 12	LAG; 1; 14	LAG; 1; 17				15th	113
2020	Jay Howard Driver Development	ROA; 1; 20	ROA; 2; 14	MOH; 1; 18	MOH; 2; 3	MOH; 3; 14	LOR; 11	IMS; 1; 5	IMS; 2; 8	IMS; 3; 20	MOH; 4; 3	MOH; 5; 9	MOH; 6; 19	NJM; 1; 9	NJM; 2; 18	**NJM**; **3**; 18	STP; 1; 14	STP; 2; 12		13th	158
2021	DEForce Racing	ALA; 1; 11	**ALA**; **2**; 2	STP; 1; 26	STP; 2; 21	IMS; 1; 23	IMS; 2; 24	IMS; 3; 14	LOR; 9	ROA; 1; 4	ROA; 2; 23	MOH; 1; 5	MOH; 2; 6	MOH; 3; 19	NJMP; 1; 8	NJMP; 2; 3	NJMP; 3; 1*	MOH; 4; 6	MOH; 5; 2	8th	227

==== Indy Pro 2000 Championship ====
(key) (Races in bold indicate pole position) (Races in italics indicate fastest lap) (Races with * indicate most race laps led)

Year	Team	1	2	3	4	5	6	7	8	9	10	11	12	13	14	15	16	17	18	Rank	Points
2021	DEForce Racing	ALA; 1	ALA; 2	STP; 1	STP; 2	IMS; 1	IMS; 2	IMS; 3	LOR	ROA; 1	ROA; 2	MOH; 1	MOH; 2	GMP; 5	NJM; 1	NJM; 2	NJM; 3	MOH; 1	MOH; 2	18th	26
2022	DEForce Racing	STP; 1; 5	**STP**; **2**; 1*	ALA; 1; 7	**ALA**; **2**; 1*	IMS; 1; 13	IMS; 2; 2	IMS; 3; 6	IRP; 5	ROA; 1; 11	ROA; 2; 7	MOH; 1; 3	MOH; 2; 7	TOR; 1; 5	TOR; 2; 12	GMP; 2	POR; 1; 14	POR; 2; 8	POR; 3; 3	4th	333

==== Indy NXT ====
(key) (Races in bold indicate pole position) (Races in italics indicate fastest lap) (Races with ^{L} indicate a race lap led) (Races with * indicate most race laps led)

Year	Team	1	2	3	4	5	6	7	8	9	10	11	12	13	14	Rank	Points
2022	HMD Motorsports with Dale Coyne Racing	STP	BAR	IMS	IMS	DET	DET	RDA	MOH	IOW	NSH	GMP	POR	LAG; 10	LAG; 9	17th	42
2023	HMD Motorsports with Dale Coyne Racing	STP; 2^{L}	BAR; 2	IMS; 13	DET; 8^{L}	DET; 1^{L}*	RDA; 1^{L}*	MOH; 15	IOW; 15	NSH; 5	IMS; 12	GMP; 6	POR; 2	LAG; 16	LAG; 7	3rd	415
2024	HMD Motorsports	**STP**; 1^{L}*	BAR; 2	IMS; 2	IMS; 5	DET; 18	RDA; Wth	LAG	LAG	MOH	IOW	GMP	POR	MIL	NSH	17th	177

==== IndyCar Series ====
(key) (Races in bold indicate pole position; races in italics indicate fastest lap)

Year	Team	No.	Chassis	Engine	1	2	3	4	5	6	7	8	9	10	11	12	13	14	15	16	17	18	Rank	Points	Ref
2024	Dale Coyne Racing	18	Dallara DW12	Honda	STP	THE; DNQ				INDY; DNQ	DET												23rd	154	
2024	Dale Coyne Racing w/ Rick Ware Racing	51	Dallara DW12	Honda			LBH; 20	ALA	IMS														23rd	154	
2024	Juncos Hollinger Racing	78	Dallara DW12	Chevrolet								ROA; 23											23rd	154	
2024	Arrow McLaren	6	Dallara DW12	Chevrolet									LAG; 12	MOH; 20	IOW; 12	IOW; 14	TOR; 21	GTW; 7	POR; 21	MIL; 17	MIL; 25	NSH; 18	23rd	154	
2025	Arrow McLaren	6	Dallara DW12	Chevrolet	STP; 25	THE; 19	LBH; 20	ALA; 9	IMS; 13	INDY; 13	DET; 19	GTW; 19	ROA; 8	MOH; 11	IOW; 24	IOW; DNS	TOR; 18	LAG; 18	POR; 16	MIL; 27	NSH; 17		22nd	213	
2026	Arrow McLaren	6	Dallara DW12	Chevrolet	STP; 20	PHX; 20	ARL; 24	ALA; 18	LBH; 12	IMS; 10	INDY; 11	DET; 15	GTW; 24	ROA; 21	MOH; 10	NSH; 11	POR; 18	MRK; 12	WSH; 6	MIL; 13	MIL; 17	LAG; 24	20th	259	

* Season still in progress.

==== Indianapolis 500 ====
Year	Chassis	Engine	Start	Finish	Team
2024	Dallara	Honda	DNQ		Dale Coyne Racing
2025	Dallara	Chevrolet	24	13	Arrow McLaren
2026	Dallara	Chevrolet	20	11	Arrow McLaren

=== Complete IMSA SportsCar Championship results ===
(key) (Races in bold indicate pole position; results in italics indicate fastest lap)

Year	Team	Class	Make	Engine	1	2	3	4	5	6	7	8	Pos.	Points
2022	Mühlner Motorsports America	LMP3	Duqueine M30 - D08	Nissan VK56DE 5.6 L V8	DAY; 6	SEB	MOH		MOS	ELK	PET		22nd	618
2022	Jr III Motorsports	LMP3	Duqueine M30 - D08	Nissan VK56DE 5.6 L V8				WGL; 6					22nd	618
2023	Sean Creech Motorsport	LMP3	Ligier JS P320	Nissan VK56DE 5.6 L V8	**DAY**; 2				MOS		IMS; 3		25th	332
2023	CrowdStrike Racing by APR	LMP2	Oreca 07	Gibson GK428 4.2 L V8		SEB; 5	LGA	WGL; 1		ELK		PET; 1	8th	1016
2024	Sean Creech Motorsport	LMP2	Ligier JS P217	Gibson GK428 4.2 L V8	DAY; 9	SEB	WGL	MOS	ELK	IMS	PET		53rd	239
2026	Inter Europol Competition	LMP2	Oreca 07	Gibson GK428 4.2 L V8	DAY; 3	SEB	WGL	MOS	ELK	IMS	PET		33rd	325

=== Complete Asian Le Mans Series results ===
(key) (Races in bold indicate pole position) (Races in italics indicate fastest lap)

Year	Team	Class	Car	Engine	1	2	3	4	5	6	Pos.	Points
2023	Inter Europol Competition	LMP2	Oreca 07	Gibson GK428 4.2 L V8	**DUB**; **1** Ret	**DUB**; **2**; 1	ABU; 1; 4	ABU; 2 NC			5th	39
2025–26	Inter Europol Competition	LMP2	Oreca 07	Gibson GK428 4.2 L V8	SEP; 1; 14	SEP; 2; 12	DUB; 1; 11	DUB; 2 NC	ABU; 1; 9	ABU; 2; 2	13th	20

=== Complete 24 Hours of Le Mans results ===
Year	Team	Co-drivers	Car	Class	Laps	Pos.	Class pos.
2024	(United Kingdom) United Autosports	(United States) Bijoy Garg (United Kingdom) Oliver Jarvis	Oreca 07-Gibson	LMP2	297	15th	**1st**
