= Sting Ray Robb =

American racing driver (born 2001)

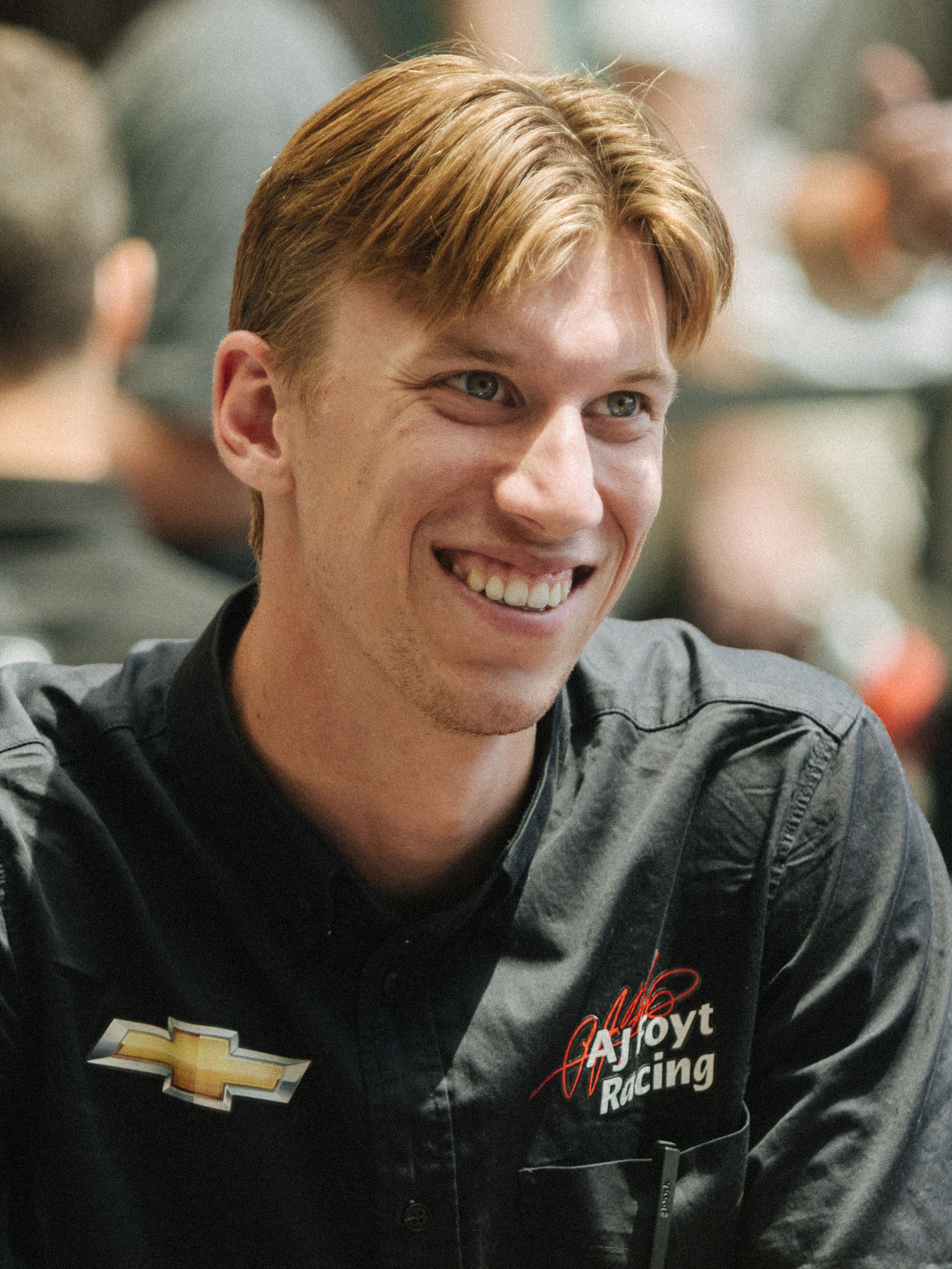
- Robb at the Detroit Grand Prix in 2024
- Nationality: (United States) American
- Born: September 3, 2001 (age 25) Payette, Idaho, United States
- Categorisation: FIA Gold

IndyCar Series career
- 66 races run over 4 years
- Team: No. 77 (Juncos Hollinger Racing)
- Best finish: 20th (2024)
- First race: 2023 Grand Prix of St. Petersburg (St. Petersburg)
- Last race: 2026 Mission Grand Prix of Monterey (Laguna Seca)
Wins	Podiums	Poles
0	0	0

Previous series
- 2021–22 2017–20: Indy Lights; Star Mazda \ Indy Pro 2000

Sting Ray Robb (born September 3, 2001) is an American racing driver who competes in the LMP2 class of the Asian Le Mans Series for United Autosports.

== Early career ==
=== Karting ===
Robb received a go-kart at age five, kickstarting his racing career. He started running nationally at age eight, entering Cadet division events from 2010 to 2013. During his first season in the Junior ranks, he finished second in America and raced in Valencia, Spain. Robb won a national championship in Rotax Junior Max karting in 2015. He also raced go-karts in Portugal. In 2015, Robb achieved second place in the Karts to Car Scholarship Shootout, earning a US$15,000 scholarship to race in the Skip Barber Race Series.

=== Junior open-wheel formulae ===
==== First seasons ====
Robb switched from go-kart racing to car racing in 2015. He raced in the Skip Barber Winter Series during that year's winter and finished second in the standings. After winning a race in the Formula Car Challenge, where he drove part-time for World Speed Motorsports, he joined the team ahead of the 2017 Pro Mazda Championship. Robb, the youngest driver on the grid, started the year with fourth place in race 2 at St. Petersburg. Further fourth places followed at Road America and Watkins Glen, as well as fifth at Mid-Ohio. Robb finished sixth in the points standings. He remained in Pro Mazda the following season, this time driving for Team Pelfrey. Thanks to a last-lap pass on teammate Andrés Gutiérrez, Robb finished a season-best at Indianapolis. Despite three further top fives, Robb dropped to seventh in the championship.

==== Indy Pro 2000 ====
In 2019, Robb joined Juncos Racing as a part of their Indy Pro 2000 roster. He finished third at the season opener in St. Petersburg. Though a lockup cost him a podium in the first Indy race, Robb bounced back with a second place in race 2 after holding off Danial Frost. He then battled well against Kyle Kirkwood on the Lucas Oil Raceway oval to finish second in the next race. Robb suffered a mechanical issue in race 2 at Road America, before crashing out from a battle for second in Toronto. In the next round at Mid-Ohio, Robb returned to the podium in race 2. He scored his maiden pole at Portland, but was punted into a spin by Artem Petrov at the start. In race 2 of the weekend, Robb finished second. Robb then took pole and led the most laps at Laguna Seca, before experiencing strong tyre wear in the closing laps. An off at turn 5 allowed Kirkwood to pass him, and Robb had to settle for second place again. In the overall standings, Robb finished fourth.

For the 2020 Indy Pro season, Robb returned to Juncos. He started by finishing second at Road America and third in race 2 at Mid-Ohio. He concluded the latter weekend by winning his maiden Indy Pro 2000 race, inheriting the lead and holding off Hunter McElrea in the closing laps. Following the two oval rounds, Robb swept a three-race weekend at Indianapolis. Robb held off Parker Thompson in race 2 of the second Mid-Ohio round to claim another victory. Having stood on all three spots of the podium during the New Jersey event, including a win from pole in race 2, Robb secured the Indy Pro 2000 championship with two races to spare. With a victory in the final round at St. Petersburg, Robb's season tally included seven victories, five pole positions and eleven podiums.

==== Indy Lights ====
Robb remained with Juncos in 2021 as he used his scholarship from winning the Indy Pro title to move up into Indy Lights. Robb finished eighth in the points standings, with only one top five at Mid-Ohio to his name.

On October 28, 2021, Andretti Autosport announced that Robb would join the team full-time for the 2022 Indy Lights season. In the second round of the season at Barber, Robb scored his first podium in the series with third. He inherited another third place in race 1 at Indy thanks to an incident ahead, then went from 13th on the grid to third in race 2, passing a battling group of cars in the closing laps. Robb attempted to pass Benjamin Pedersen for second place in the opening Detroit race but slid into the wall, causing him to finish eleventh. He returned to the podium with third on Sunday. At Road America, Robb qualified on pole and finished second, having been overtaken by Christian Rasmussen during the lap 11 restart. A sixth at Mid-Ohio and fifth in Iowa were followed by another second-place finish on the streets of Nashville. Next followed two quieter rounds with a pair of sixth places. In the Laguna Seca season finale, Robb dominated race 1 from pole, building an 11-second gap to achieve his first and only Indy Lights win. He narrowly missed out on victory in race 2 to Rasmussen, finishing second in both the race and overall points table.

== IndyCar Series ==
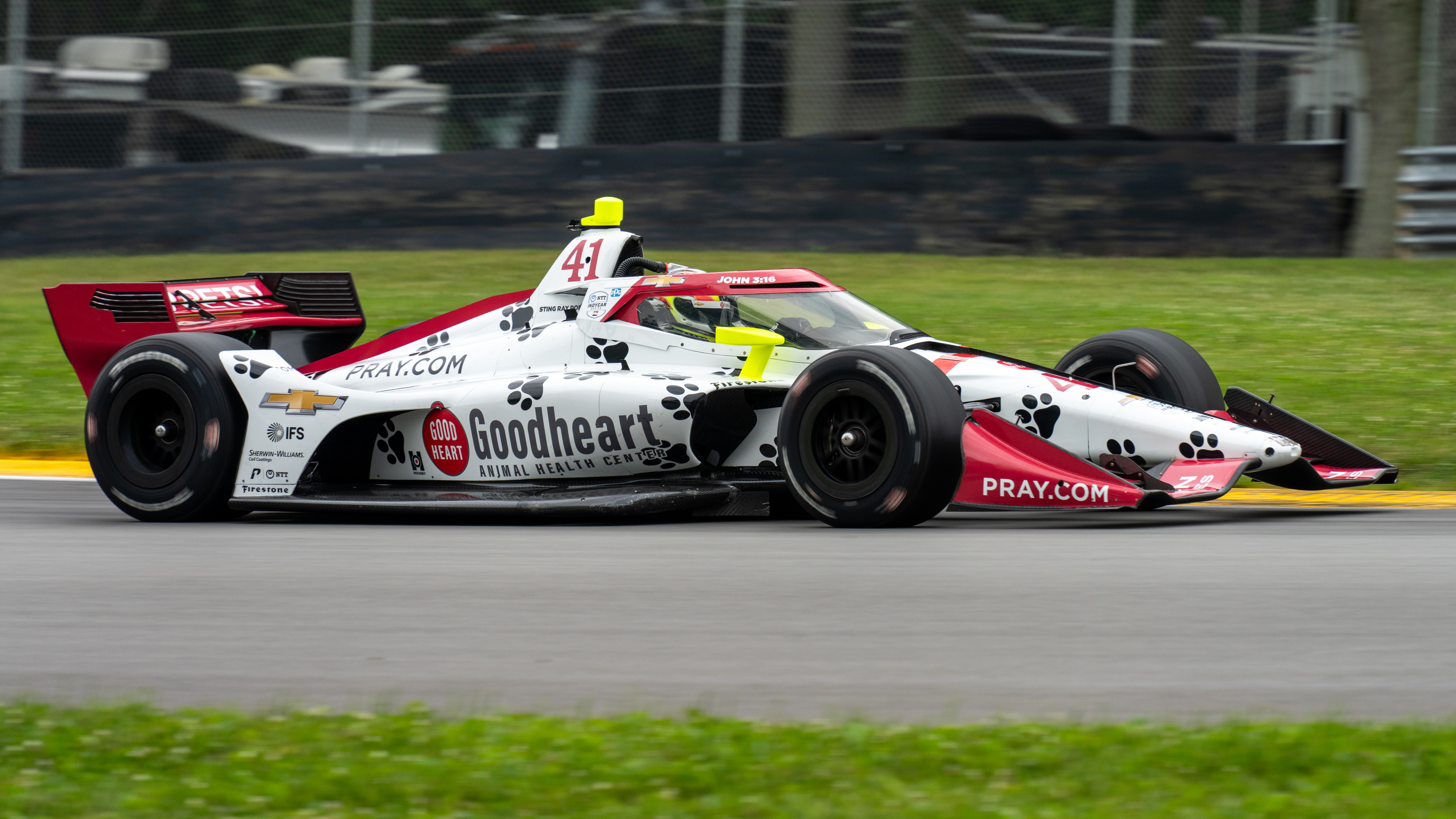
Robb's 2024 IndyCar

Robb made his IndyCar Series testing debut in July 2022, driving the No. 98 Andretti alongside Christian Rasmussen.

=== Dale Coyne Racing (2023) ===
With significant financial backing and feeling his stock was at his highest, Robb elected to step up to the IndyCar Series rather than stay in the renamed-for-2023 Indy NXT series. Robb was later confirmed as the full-time driver for Dale Coyne Racing with Rick Ware Racing for the 2023 season, partnering David Malukas. The opening number of races saw Robb being involved in a number of incidents, including a mistake at his maiden IndyCar oval race at Texas which saw him sliding into the wall. As well as this, Robb caused a collision with his teammate Malukas at the Indianapolis Road Course, later apologising for ending the team's day on lap two. In May, he qualified for his first Indianapolis 500, posting a speed of 229.549 mph during the "Last Chance" session to line up 32nd. Robb crashed in turn 1 near the mid-point of the race, finishing 31st. This ended up being Robb's final retirement of the season, though he would be disqualified from the second race at Iowa when one of the wheels dislodged itself after a pit stop. The Idahoan attained the best finish of his campaign at Laguna Seca, finishing twelfth, though it did not prevent him from ending up 23rd in the standings, with Benjamin Pedersen being the only full-time driver beaten by Robb.

=== A.J. Foyt Racing (2024) ===
For the 2024 season, Robb switched to A. J. Foyt Racing, which had just taken on a technical partnership with Team Penske. Robb was lightly injured after a last lap crash during race 2 at Iowa: he could not avoid the back of the slowing car of Alexander Rossi on the final lap, hitting the rear of the McLaren and somersaulting onto his own car's aeroscreen. In the next race at Toronto, Robb retired after a multi-car crash. Finally, at Gateway, Robb claimed his maiden top 10 finish with a ninth place. Having caused two cautions in race 2 at Milwaukee, Robb concluded the season by finishing 20th in the points standings.

=== Juncos Hollinger Racing (2025–) ===
==== 2025 season ====
Robb moved to Juncos Hollinger Racing in 2025, reuniting with his Indy Pro 2000 championship-winning team with Townsend Lucas as his race engineer. At the season-opening St. Petersburg race, Robb held up eventual winner Álex Palou near race's end in an attempt to stay on the lead lap; Robb finished 21st. In race 3 at Long Beach, Robb was one of just six drivers to start on prime tyres. He led for 12 laps using this alternate strategy and eventually finished ninth in the caution-free race. It was later reported that Robb was working with driver coach Rob Wilson to improve his performances. Robb qualified 19th for the Indy 500, which later became 17th following two penalties for Team Penske. He was taken out mid-race following a spin by Kyle Larson. Having started 26th at Detroit, Robb progressed to 15th in a chaotic race. Robb crashed out at Road America, nearly hitting the back of Marcus Armstrong under braking and hitting the turn 5 outside wall in avoidance. Another crash came at Iowa, where Robb hit the turn 2 wall hard during race 2. Results of 17th at Toronto and 19th at Laguna Seca followed, before Robb was one of two drivers to run on the hard tyres for multiple stints at Portland; he finished 14th. He concluded the season by finishing 23rd at Milwaukee and 16th at Nashville. He concluded the year 25th in the points standings, third-lowest of the full-time drivers.

==== 2026 season ====
Robb was retained by Juncos Hollinger Racing for 2026, where he joined up alongside Rinus VeeKay. He finished the season in 25th, with a best finish of 11th across the season.

== Other racing ==
=== NASCAR ===
In late 2016, Robb made his NASCAR K&N Pro Series West debut in Utah, thereby becoming the youngest driver to ever participate in the series. Robb competed in the NASCAR K&N Pro Series West 2018 NAPA Auto Parts Idaho 208, finishing tenth.

=== Endurance racing ===
During the off-season of late 2026 and early 2027, Robb will compete in the Asian Le Mans Series with United Autosports, driving alongside Ian Aguilera and Giorgio Roda in the LMP2 category.

== Personal life ==
Robb attended Payette High School; he played basketball and ran cross country at the school. Robb is a devout Christian, saying in an article on Racer.com, "My heroes are all those who have come alongside to make it possible for me to follow God's calling in my life; and to them I say, 'Thank you.' All the glory goes to God!"

Robb's parents are Chevrolet enthusiasts and named him after the Chevrolet Corvette Stingray sports car.

== Racing record ==
=== Career summary ===
Season	Series	Team	Races	Wins	Poles	F/Laps	Podiums	Points	Position
2015–16	Skip Barber Winter Series	Skip Barber Racing School	10	3	1	2	6	329	**2nd**
2016	NASCAR K&N Pro Series West	Bob Wood	3	0	0	0	0	81	29th
2017	Pro Mazda Championship	World Speed Motorsports	12	0	0	0	0	185	6th
2018	Pro Mazda Championship	Team Pelfrey	16	0	0	0	1	231	7th
2018	NASCAR K&N Pro Series West	Patriot Motorsports Group	1	0	0	0	0	34	42nd
2019	Indy Pro 2000 Championship	Juncos Racing	16	0	2	1	6	323	4th
2020	Indy Pro 2000 Championship	Juncos Racing	17	7	5	5	11	437	**1st**
2021	Indy Lights	Juncos Hollinger Racing	20	0	0	0	0	249	8th
2022	Indy Lights	Andretti Autosport	14	1	2	4	8	483	**2nd**
2023	IndyCar Series	Dale Coyne Racing with Rick Ware Racing	17	0	0	0	0	147	23rd
2024	IndyCar Series	A. J. Foyt Racing	17	0	0	0	0	185	20th
2025	IndyCar Series	Juncos Hollinger Racing	17	0	0	0	0	181	25th
2026	IndyCar Series	Juncos Hollinger Racing	18	0	0	0	0	182	25th
2026–27	Asian Le Mans Series – LMP2	United Autosports	2	0	1	0	1	26*	4th*

* Season still in progress.

=== NASCAR ===
(key) (Bold – Pole position awarded by qualifying time. Italics – Pole position earned by points standings or practice time. * – Most laps led.)

==== K&N Pro Series West ====
NASCAR K&N Pro Series West results
Year	Team	No.	Make	1	2	3	4	5	6	7	8	9	10	11	12	13	14	NKNPSWC	Pts	Ref
2016	Bob Wood	14	Chevy	IRW	KCR	TUS	OSS	CNS	SON	SLS	IOW	EVG	DCS	MMP; 17	MMP; 20	MER; 14	AAS	29th	81	
2018	Patriot Motorsports Group	36	Chevy	KCR	TUS	TUS	OSS	CNS	SON	DCS	IOW	EVG	GTW	LVS	MER; 10	AAS	KCR	42nd	34	

=== American open-wheel racing results ===
(key)

==== Pro Mazda / Indy Pro 2000 Championship ====
Year	Team	1	2	3	4	5	6	7	8	9	10	11	12	13	14	15	16	17	Rank	Points
2017	World Speed Motorsports	STP; 7	STP; 4	IMS; 7	IMS; 7	ROA; 4	ROA; 11	MOH; 10	MOH; 6	MOH; 5	GMP; 7	WGL; 4	WGL; 6						6th	185
2018	Team Pelfrey	STP; 6	STP; 4	BAR; 9	BAR; 10	IMS; 13	IMS; 3	LOR; 5	ROA; 11	ROA; 9	TOR; 11	TOR; 7	MOH; 9	MOH; 4	GMP; 9	POR; 6	POR; 6		7th	231
2019	Juncos Racing	STP; 3	STP; 5	IMS; 4	IMS; 2	LOR; 2	ROA; 7	ROA; 10	TOR; 11	TOR; 5	MOH; 5	MOH; 2	GTW; 5	**POR**; 8	POR; 2	**LAG**; 2	LAG; 6		4th	323
2020	Juncos Racing	ROA; 5	ROA; 2	MOH; 10	MOH; 3	MOH; 1	LOR; 6	GMP; 4	IMS; 1	**IMS**; 1	**IMS**; 1	MOH; 4	MOH; 1	NJM; 2	**NJM**; 1	NJM; 3	**STP**; 1	**STP**; 5	1st	437

==== Indy Lights ====
(key) (Races in bold indicate pole position) (Races in italics indicate fastest lap) (Races with ^{L} indicate a race lap led) (Races with * indicate most race laps led)

Year	Team	1	2	3	4	5	6	7	8	9	10	11	12	13	14	15	16	17	18	19	20	Rank	Points
2021	Juncos Racing	ALA; 1; 8	ALA; 2; 8	STP; 1; 6	STP; 2; 13	IMS; 1; 9	IMS; 2; 10	DET; 1; 10	DET; 2; 10	RDA; 1; 8	RDA; 2; 9	MOH; 1; 11	MOH; 2; 10	GTW; 1; 12	GTW; 2; 11	POR; 1; 9	POR; 2; 11	LAG; 1; 6	LAG; 2; 9	MOH; 1; 5	MOH; 2; 7	8th	249
2022	Andretti Autosport	STP; 4	ALA; 3	IMS; 1; 3	IMS; 2; 3	DET; 1; 11	DET; 2; 3	**RDA**; 2^{L}	MOH; 6	IOW; 5	NSH; 2	GTW; 6	POR; 6	**LAG**; **1**; 1^{L*}	LAG; 2; 2							2nd	483

==== IndyCar Series ====
(key)

Year	Team	No.	Chassis	Engine	1	2	3	4	5	6	7	8	9	10	11	12	13	14	15	16	17	18	Rank	Points	Ref
2023	Dale Coyne Racing w/ Rick Ware Racing	51	Dallara DW12	Honda	STP; 16	TXS; 25	LBH; 18	ALA; 27	IMS; 27	INDY; 31	DET; 22	ROA; 22	MOH; 22	TOR; 19	IOW; 25	IOW; 28	NSH; 17	IMS; 22	GTW; 21	POR; 23	LAG; 12		23rd	147	
2024	A. J. Foyt Enterprises	41	Dallara DW12	Chevrolet	STP; 24	THE; DNQ	LBH; 18	ALA; 26	IMS; 22	INDY; 16	DET; 21	ROA; 17	LAG; 20	MOH; 16	IOW; 15	IOW; 21	TOR; 25	GTW; 9	POR; 18	MIL; 23	MIL; 18	NSH; 20	20th	185	
2025	Juncos Hollinger Racing	77	Dallara DW12	Chevrolet	STP; 21	THE; 23	LBH; 9	ALA; 22	IMS; 21	INDY; 23	DET; 15	GTW; 20	ROA; 26	MOH; 18	IOW; 22	IOW; 23	TOR; 17	LAG; 19	POR; 14	MIL; 23	NSH; 16		25th	181	
2026	Juncos Hollinger Racing	77	Dallara DW12	Chevrolet	STP; 21	PHX; 21	ARL; 21	ALA; 22	LBH; 23	IMS; 17	INDY; 23	DET; 14	GTW; 19	ROA; 19	MOH; 22	NSH; 15	POR; 22	MRK; 11	WSH; 25	MIL; 22	MIL; 18	LAG; 23	25th	182	

==== Indianapolis 500 ====
Year	Chassis	Engine	Start	Finish	Team
2023	Dallara	Honda	31	31	Dale Coyne Racing w/ Rick Ware Racing
2024	Dallara	Chevrolet	23	16	A. J. Foyt Enterprises
2025	Dallara	Chevrolet	17	23	Juncos Hollinger Racing
2026	Dallara	Chevrolet	31	23	Juncos Hollinger Racing

Sporting positions
Preceded by Kyle Kirkwood	Indy Pro 2000 Championship; Champion; 2020	Succeeded by Christian Rasmussen
