= 2026 Indianapolis 500 =

American motor race

110th Indianapolis 500

Indianapolis Motor Speedway

Indianapolis 500
- Sanctioning body: IndyCar
- Season: 2026 IndyCar Series
- Date: May 24, 2026
- Winner: (Sweden) Felix Rosenqvist
- Winning team: Meyer Shank Racing
- Winning Chief Mechanic: Kyle Gibson
- Time of race: 3:05:09.6471
- Average speed: 162.021 mph (260.748 km/h)
- Pole position: (Spain) Álex Palou
- Pole speed: 232.248 mph (373.767 km/h)
- Rookie of the Year: (Germany) Mick Schumacher
- Most laps led: (Spain) Álex Palou (59)
- Fastest Lap: (United States) Conor Daly (225.126 mph)

Pre-race ceremonies
- National anthem: Jordin Sparks
- "Back Home Again in Indiana": Jim Cornelison
- Starting command: Roger Penske
- Pace car: Chevrolet Corvette ZR1X
- Pace car driver: Curt Cignetti
- Two-seater: Jimmie Johnson (driver); Alec Pierce (passenger)
- Starter: Aaron Likens
- Honorary starter: Brendan Fraser

Television in the United States
- Network: Fox
- Announcers: Will Buxton, James Hinchcliffe, Townsend Bell
- Nielsen ratings: 6.6 million

Chronology
Previous	Next
2025	2027

The 2026 Indianapolis 500 (branded as the 110th Running of the Indianapolis 500 presented by Gainbridge for sponsorship reasons) was an IndyCar Series race that took place on May 24, 2026, at the Indianapolis Motor Speedway in Speedway, Indiana. The race was the seventh round of the NTT IndyCar Series season. The month of May activities formally began with the Sonsio Grand Prix on the combined road course on May 9. The race was televised on Fox. This was the first "500" since the Fox Corporation acquired a one-third stake in IndyCar and Indianapolis Motor Speedway parent company Penske Entertainment in August 2025.

Practice began on May 12, and Time Trials were scheduled for May 16–17. The first day of qualifying, however, was rained out. Carb Day, the traditional final day of practice took place on May 22. The annual Pit Stop Challenge, however, was halted and cancelled due to rain. A full-field open test was held April 28–29, which included rookie orientation. Álex Palou was the defending winner, and three-time defending IndyCar Series champion. Palou qualified for the pole position, his second career Indy pole. The Carb Day practice event on Friday, May 22 honored the late NASCAR driver Kyle Busch – a two-time winner of the Brickyard 400 – who died from complications with pneumonia on Thursday, May 21. Dale Coyne Racing further honored Busch by decorating Romain Grosjean's No. 18 car with the same number font Busch used throughout his NASCAR career. Later that evening, Busch was also remembered at the Coca-Cola 600.

Felix Rosenqvist of Meyer Shank Racing started 4th and ran in the top ten nearly all day. Executing an alternate fuel strategy, he took the lead for the first time on lap 154 (of 200). Two late-race cautions set up a one-lap shootout to the finish. With the green and white flag waving for the final lap, David Malukas of Team Penske grabbed the lead from Marcus Armstrong, with Rosenqvist third. Rosenqvist and Armstrong raced side-by-side for nearly the entire final lap, while Malukas pulled out to a small lead. Coming out of turn four, Felix Rosenqvist made a strong run and beat David Malukas to the finish line by 0.0233 seconds, the closest margin of victory in Indy 500 history. It was Rosenqvist's first Indy 500 victory, and the second for Meyer Shank Racing (2021, 2026).

Several race records were broken, including 70 lead changes, the most in Indy history. The previous record was 68, set in 2013. The previous closest finish came in 1992 when Al Unser Jr. beat Scott Goodyear by 0.043 seconds. Álex Palou and Scott Dixon traded the lead a record-breaking 26 times. The previous record of lead changes between the same two drivers was 18, between James Hinchcliffe and Ryan Hunter-Reay (2016). Santino Ferrucci also completed the full 500-mile distance for a record-breaking eighth consecutive year. 2026 marked the fifth time in Indy 500 history that the lap leader on the final lap (David Malukas) failed to win. Felix Rosenqvist became the first 34-year-old to win an Indy 500 since Helio Castroneves did so in 2009.

For the third year in a row, a driver attempted to complete "Double Duty", as Katherine Legge attempted to compete in both the Indianapolis 500 and Coca-Cola 600 on the same day. After a crash attempting to avoid a spinning Ryan Hunter-Reay on Lap 18, Legge reached Charlotte and raced the Coca-Cola 600, finishing the latter 12 laps behind the winner and in 31st place, last among cars still in the race.

== Race background ==
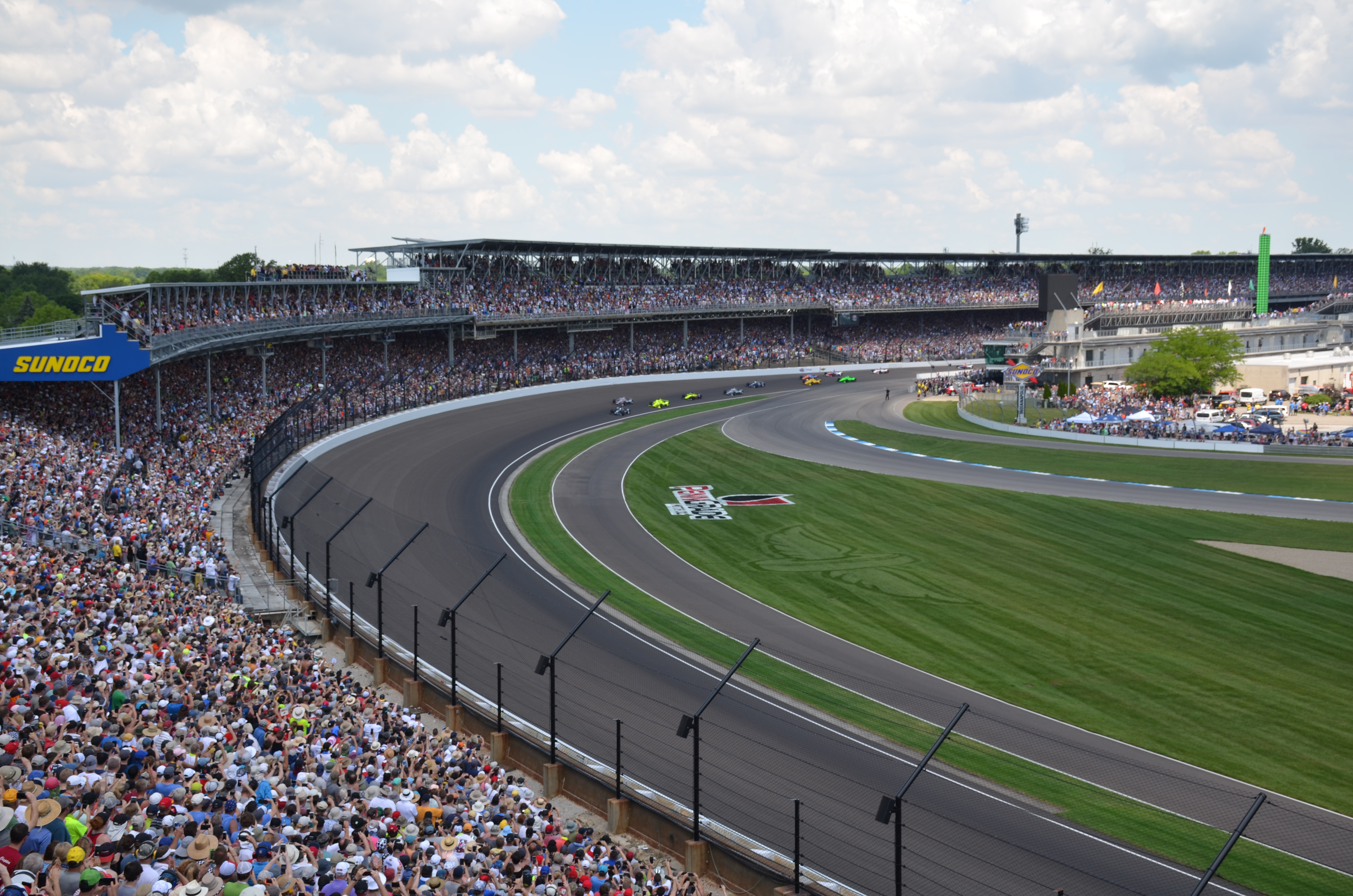
Turn one at the Indianapolis Motor Speedway (pictured in 2018).

The Indianapolis 500, commonly called the Indy 500, is held at the Indianapolis Motor Speedway, a 2.5-mile (4.02 km) paved oval. First held in 1911, it is currently a points-paying race of the NTT IndyCar Series. The event is contested by "Indy cars", a formula of professional-level, single-seat, open cockpit, open-wheel, purpose-built race cars. The race is the most prestigious event of the IndyCar calendar, and one of the oldest and most important automobile races in the world. The race traditionally has a field of 33 cars.

=== Track improvements ===
According to Indianapolis Motor Speedway president Doug Boles, track maintenance crews have been investigating bumps in Turn 2 since 2019. During track evaluations prior to the 2025 race, the Turn 2 bump in question was considerably higher than in the past. The pavement was pressed in an attempt to reduce the severity. In July 2025, during the Brickyard 400, the severity of the bumps in Turn 2 were reported by drivers and crew chiefs during the track walk and all sessions.

On September 23, 2025, construction crews excavated the section of track in question. It was determined that bricks originally installed in 1909 (that had been paved over by asphalt in 1937) had expanded and split due to moisture, which raised the pavement. The damaged bricks were removed and a new base was applied. The section of the track was repaved, followed by diamond grinding to blend the new section with the adjacent asphalt. The track was allowed to cure for four weeks before the late October Speedway tests for Firestone.

=== Rule changes ===
- A new entity, titled IndyCar Officiating, Inc. has been created, tasked with governing over the IndyCar Series and Indy NXT. It includes a three-person Independent Officiating Board (IOB) consisting of: Ray Evernham, Raj Nair (Ford), and Ronan Morgan (FIA). Scot Elkins will serve as Managing Director of Officiating. The move separates race control and technical inspection from Penske Entertainment, which owns INDYCAR and the Indianapolis Motor Speedway, in an effort to eliminate perceived conflicts of interest. In 2025, Team Penske was penalized for technical infractions during Indy 500 qualifying, resulting in two cars being moved to the back of the grid, monetary fines, and points deductions. The controversy led to the dismissal of team president Tim Cindric, and widespread calls for officiating reform. In January 2026, Team Penske revealed that Cindric had returned to the team as a strategist.
- Tire ramp flaps were mandatory on all cars. The flaps were designed to deploy in a spin and/or during rearward movement in order to reduce the likelihood of lift, preventing the car from becoming airborne. The flaps are similar in concept to the roof flaps introduced in NASCAR in 1994.
- Each entry was permitted 31 sets of tires for the entirety of the event, plus 5 additional sets for use during the Open Test. This is down from 32 sets and 8 sets, respectively in 2025. During the Rookie Orientation Program/Refresher Tests session, drivers taking rookie tests receive three additional sets, and drivers taking refresher tests receive two additional sets, for use during that session only.
- A modified qualifying format was announced on May 11, due to a lack of entries to necessitate the Last Chance Qualifying session that had been featured in previous years. During Saturday qualifying, those qualifying positions 1–15 would advance to Sunday qualifying sessions, while positions 16–33 would be locked in to their positions. During Sunday qualifying, the drivers qualified positions 10–15 on Saturday would participate in a "Final 15" session, in which the fastest three cars advance to the Top 12 session later in the day, while positions 13–15 would be locked in to their spots. The remaining session would proceed as in previous years; the fastest six cars in the Top 12 session moved on to the Fast Six, while positions 7–12 were locked. The Fast Six session would then determine starting positions 1–6.
- During the final 60 minutes of practice each day, drivers were permitted to practice entering the pit area off of turn four. This simulates the method of entering the pits used on race day. At all other times, drivers were still required to enter the pits at the warm-up lane in turn three – with exceptions only for emergency service. Previously, pitting off of turn four (during practice) was only allowed during Post-Qualifying Practice (Monday) and on Carb Day.

=== Sponsorship ===
Online financial services company Gainbridge signed an initial four-year deal for presenting sponsorship of the Indianapolis 500 from 2019 to 2022. A multi-year extension was signed in 2022. On November 6, 2025, Gainbridge signed another multi-year contract extension. Terms of the deal were undisclosed.

=== 2026 IndyCar Series ===
The 2026 Indianapolis 500 was the seventh race of the 2026 NTT IndyCar Series season. Four different drivers won the first six races of the season. Álex Palou won the season opener at St. Petersburg. Josef Newgarden won at Phoenix, and Kyle Kirkwood won at Arlington. Palou won for the second and third time this season at Alabama and Long Beach. The Sonsio Grand Prix on the Indianapolis Motor Speedway road course was won by Christian Lundgaard. It was the final race before the "500". Palou held a 27-point margin over Kirkwood in the championship points standings going into the Indianapolis 500 - the fourth year in a row Palou has led the points standings going into the "500".

==== Points standings (top 5) entering Indianapolis 500 ====
Pos	Driver	Pts
1	(Spain) Álex Palou	237
2	(United States) Kyle Kirkwood	210
3	(United States) David Malukas	185
4	(Denmark) Christian Lundgaard	182
5	(United States) Josef Newgarden	162

== Race schedule ==
Race schedule — April/May 2026
Sun	Mon	Tue	Wed	Thu	Fri	Sat
26	27	28; Open test	29; Open test	30	1	2 Mini-Marathon
3	4	5	6	7	8 Sonsio G.P.	9 Sonsio G.P.
10	11	12; Practice	13; Practice	14; Practice	15; Fast Friday	16; Time Trials
17; Time Trials	18; Practice	19	20	21	22; Carb Day	23; Parade
24; Indianapolis 500	25; Memorial Day	26	27	28	29	30

Color	Notes
Green	Practice
Blue	Time trials
Silver	Race day
Red	Rained out*
Blank	No track activity

* Includes days where track
activity was significantly limited due to rain

== Entry list ==
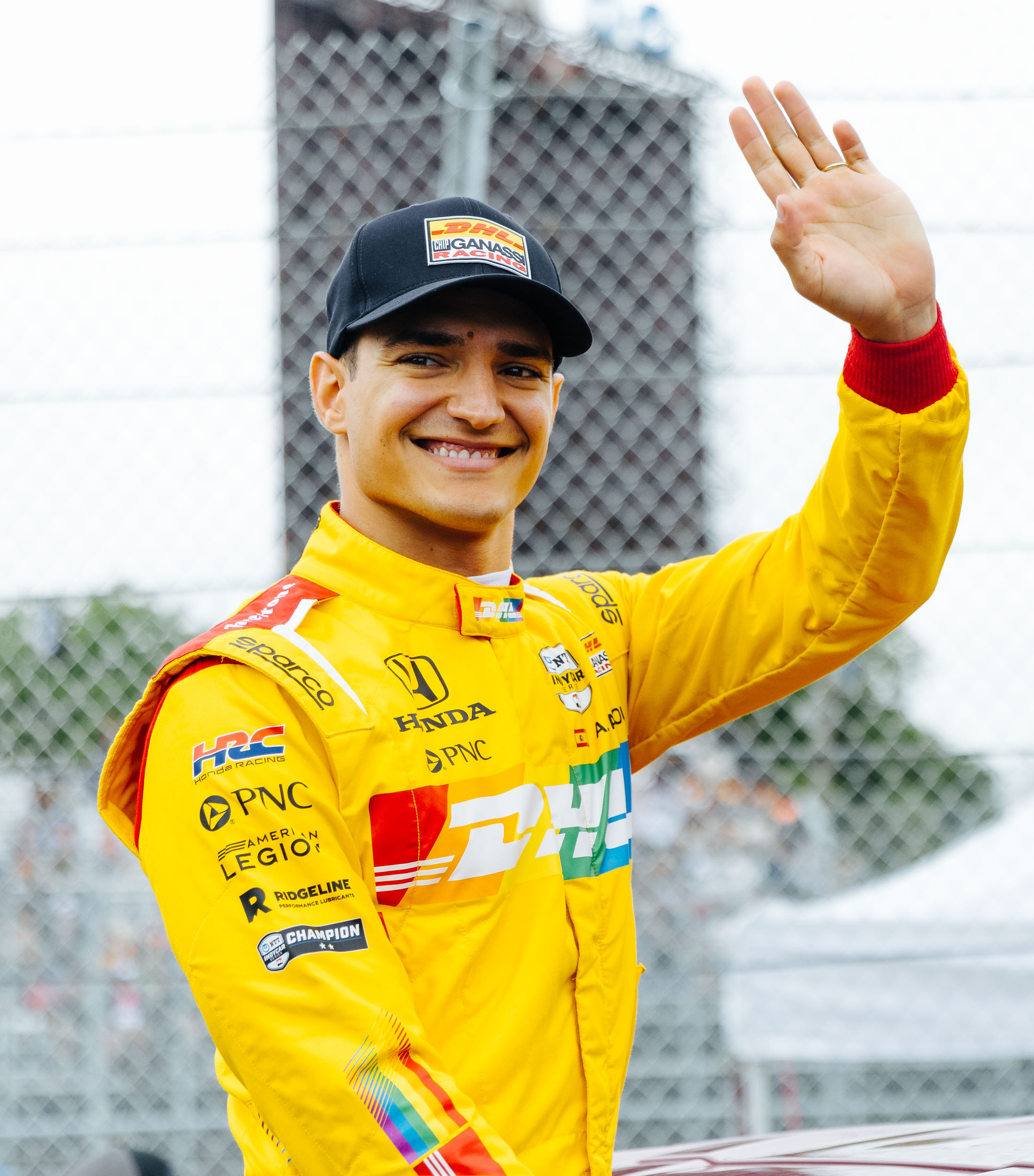
Four-time IndyCar Series champion Álex Palou (pictured in 2024) entered as the defending Indy 500 winner.

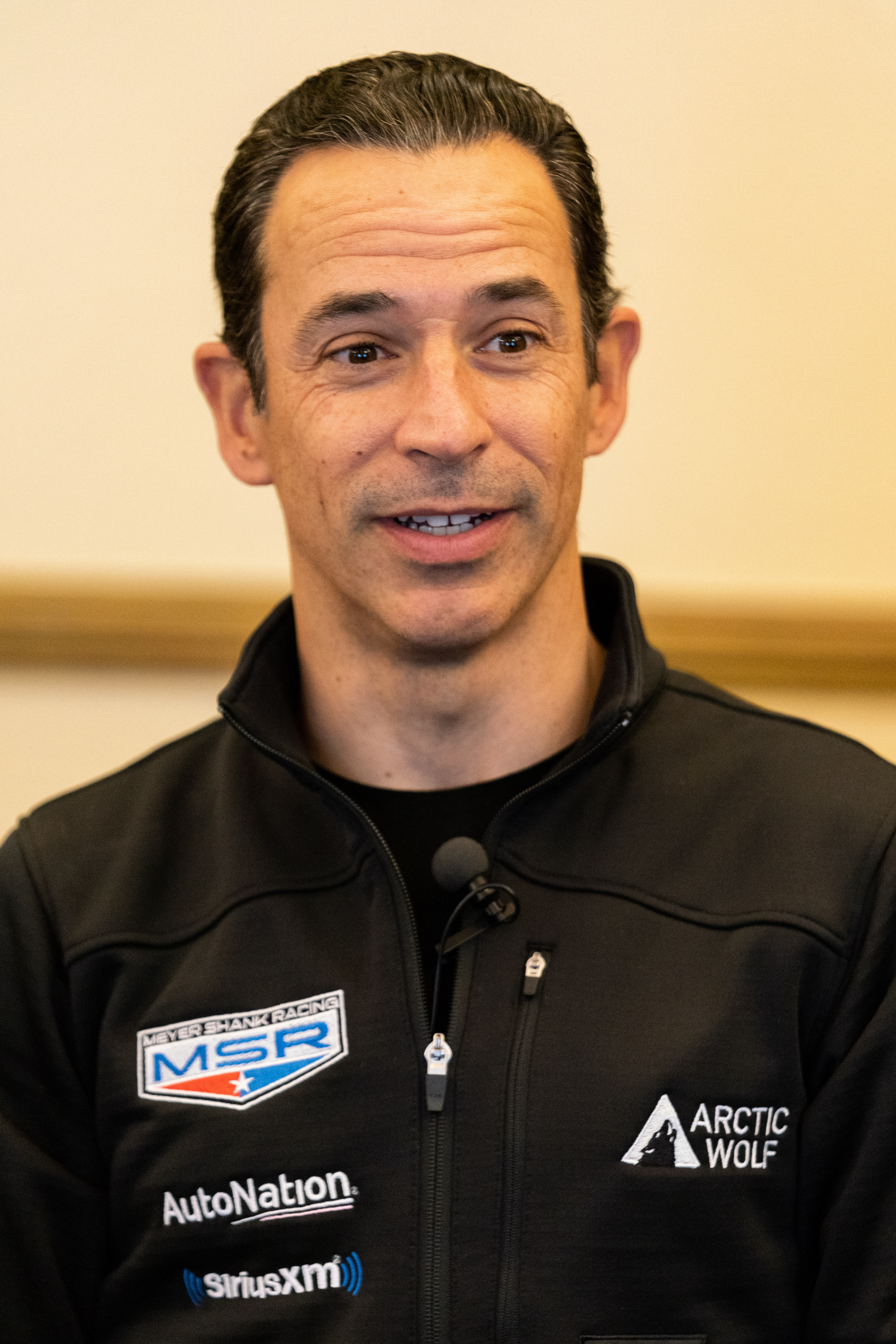
Four-time Indy 500 winner Hélio Castroneves (pictured in 2022) had the most previous starts in the field with 25.

All entries utilized a spec Dallara DW12 chassis with the UAK-18 universal aero kit and the 2020-adopted aeroscreen. Honda (HRC US) and Chevrolet (Ilmor) are the engine providers. Firestone was the exclusive tire supplier. This was the second year of hybrid energy recovery system powertrains at Indianapolis.

The official entry list was released on May 11, with 33 confirmed entries. The list included 25 full-time IndyCar Series entries, and eight one-off or "Indy-only" entries.

Andretti Global was planning to run a fourth car, in an "Indy-only" entry, with the #98. Colton Herta, who is competing full-time in Formula 2 in 2026, was the likely driver. The original Formula 2 calendar had no races scheduled for May, which would have allowed Herta to compete at Indy. However, due to the Iran war, which resulted in the cancellation of two races in Bahrain and Saudi Arabia, the Formula 2 schedule was revised with the addition of races in Miami and Canada, the latter of which was scheduled for the same day as the 500. Herta was therefore no longer available due to the scheduling conflict, and Andretti Global thus elected to not run the car.

PREMA Racing had two Chevrolet engine leases for the 2026 IndyCar Series season, but was undergoing an ownership shake-up which left the team in limbo regarding competing in any of the 2026 events. On April 10, it was announced PREMA would not enter at Indianapolis. As a result, their two engines were released to other teams.

This was the first time since 2022 that no bumping took place. Devlin DeFrancesco, who raced full-time for RLL in 2025, and Stefan Wilson, who last competed in 2023, were two drivers who aggressively pursued rides before the last entry was filled by Legge.

No.	Driver	Team	Engine	Sponsor	Ref.
2	(United States) Josef Newgarden W	Team Penske	Chevrolet	Shell	
3	(New Zealand) Scott McLaughlin	Team Penske	Chevrolet	Pennzoil	
4	(Brazil) Caio Collet R	A.J. Foyt Racing	Chevrolet	Combitrans Amazonia	
5	(Mexico) Pato O'Ward	Arrow McLaren	Chevrolet	Arrow Electronics	
6	(United States) Nolan Siegel	Arrow McLaren	Chevrolet	NTT Data	
06	(Brazil) Hélio Castroneves W	Meyer Shank Racing with Curb-Agajanian	Honda	Cleveland-Cliffs	
7	(Denmark) Christian Lundgaard	Arrow McLaren	Chevrolet	VELO	
8	(Cayman Islands) Kyffin Simpson	Chip Ganassi Racing	Honda	Sunoco	
9	(New Zealand) Scott Dixon W	Chip Ganassi Racing	Honda	PNC Bank	
10	(Spain) Álex Palou W	Chip Ganassi Racing	Honda	DHL	
11	(United Kingdom) Katherine Legge	HMD Motorsports with A.J. Foyt Enterprises	Chevrolet	e.l.f. Cosmetics	
12	(United States) David Malukas	Team Penske	Chevrolet	Verizon	
14	(United States) Santino Ferrucci	A. J. Foyt Racing	Chevrolet	Homes For Our Troops	
15	(United States) Graham Rahal	Rahal Letterman Lanigan Racing	Honda	United Rentals	
18	(France) Romain Grosjean	Dale Coyne Racing	Honda	OnlyBulls and Bitcoin MAX	
19	(Norway) Dennis Hauger R	Dale Coyne Racing	Honda	Nammo	
20	(United States) Alexander Rossi W	ECR	Chevrolet	Java House	
21	(Denmark) Christian Rasmussen	ECR	Chevrolet	Splenda	
23	(United States) Conor Daly	Dreyer & Reinbold Racing	Chevrolet	Kingspan	
24	(United Kingdom) Jack Harvey	Dreyer & Reinbold Racing	Chevrolet	INVST	
26	(Australia) Will Power W	Andretti Global	Honda	TWG AI	
27	(United States) Kyle Kirkwood	Andretti Global	Honda	Sam's Club	
28	(Sweden) Marcus Ericsson W	Andretti Global	Honda	Phoenix Investors	
31	(United States) Ryan Hunter-Reay W	Arrow McLaren with Legacy Motor Club	Chevrolet	PrizePicks	
33	(United States) Ed Carpenter	ECR	Chevrolet	SlimFast	
45	(United Kingdom) Louis Foster	Rahal Letterman Lanigan Racing	Honda	Droplight	
47	(Germany) Mick Schumacher R	Rahal Letterman Lanigan Racing	Honda	Würth	
51	(United States) Jacob Abel R	Abel Motorsports	Chevrolet	Texas Roadhouse	
60	(Sweden) Felix Rosenqvist	Meyer Shank Racing with Curb-Agajanian	Honda	SiriusXM / Morgan Wallen	
66	(New Zealand) Marcus Armstrong	Meyer Shank Racing with Curb-Agajanian	Honda^{1}	Acura	
75	(Japan) Takuma Sato W	Rahal Letterman Lanigan Racing	Honda	Amada	
76	(Netherlands) Rinus VeeKay	Juncos Hollinger Racing with Dreyer & Reinbold Racing	Chevrolet	Wedbush	
77	(United States) Sting Ray Robb	Juncos Hollinger Racing	Chevrolet	Good Heart Animal Health Center	

- Denotes a one-off or "Indy-only" entry.
- W Former Indianapolis 500 winner
- R Indianapolis 500 rookie
- ^{1} Marcus Armstrong's No. 66 entry featured Acura badging in place of normal Honda branding. The entry still used the same engine as all other Honda entries.

== Testing and Rookie Orientation ==
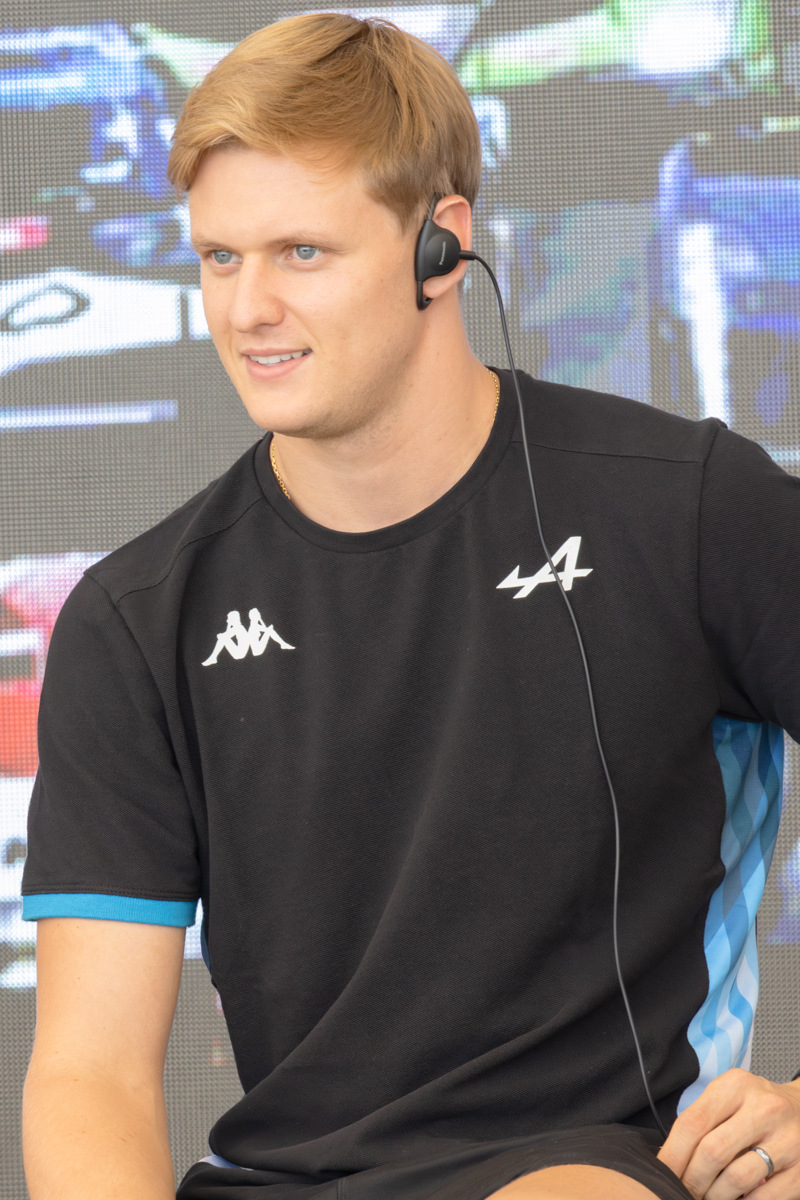
Mick Schumacher is one of four rookies entered. His father Michael Schumacher won the U.S. Grand Prix at Indy five times.

Rookie rules for the Indianapolis 500 included the mandate that a driver pass a supervised high-speed oval test before he/she is allowed to participate in the official Rookie Orientation Program (ROP) at the Indianapolis Motor Speedway. Approved venues for the initial high-speed oval track test included Texas Motor Speedway, Homestead–Miami Speedway, and a few other select venues.

The Rookie Orientation Program at Indianapolis consisted of three phases. For phase 1, each driver was required to complete ten laps between 205–210 mph (330–338 km/h), while demonstrating satisfactory car control, proper racing line, and safe interaction with other cars on the circuit. The laps did not have to be consecutive. Phase 2 was fifteen laps between 210–215 mph (338–346 km/h), and phase 3 was fifteen laps over 215 mph (346 km/h). Veteran drivers that had not competed in an IndyCar oval race since the previous year's Indy 500 were required to take a refresher test. The refresher test consisted of phase 2 and phase 3 of the aforementioned rookie test.

=== Testing – October 2025 ===
On October 20–21, 2025, the Speedway organized private testing. Álex Palou (Ganassi) and Pato O'Ward (Arrow McLaren) participated in tire tests for Firestone, including evaluating the newly repaved section of track to remove bumps in turn 2. A new tire compound was developed in order to address weight balance issues stemming from the hybrid system first used at the Speedway in 2025. Alexander Rossi (ECR) and Takuma Sato (RLLR) tested brake and damper components for speedway-specific braking systems (used at Indianapolis and Nashville).

=== Rookie oval tests ===
The series hosted a high-speed oval rookie evaluation test at Nashville Superspeedway on November 6, 2025. Two drivers participated: Dennis Hauger (Coyne) and Caio Collet (Foyt). No incidents were reported. Both drivers completed their evaluations and were approved to take the Rookie Orientation Program at the April Open Test at Indianapolis.

Rahal Letterman Lanigan Racing conducted a private oval evaluation test for rookie driver Mick Schumacher at Homestead–Miami Speedway on February 4, 2026. Schumacher, guided by driver coach Ryan Briscoe, took his first laps on an oval, completing 97 laps without incident. He posted a top lap of 194 mph.

=== Open Test Day 1 — Tuesday April 28 ===
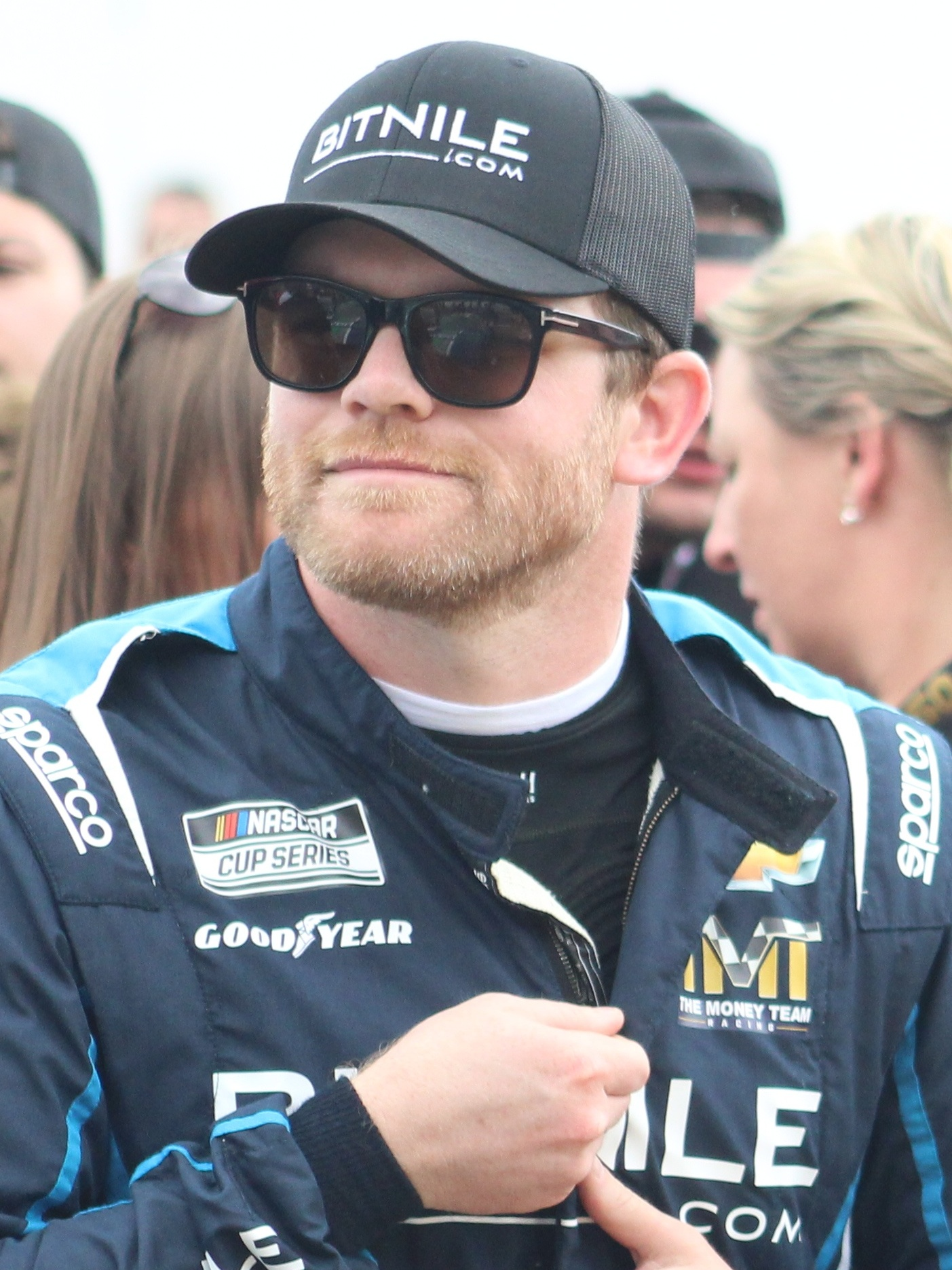
Conor Daly (pictured in 2023) was fastest on Day 1 of the Open Test.

The first day of open testing was scheduled for April 28. After a five-minute period for install laps, the track was first made available for veterans from 10:05 a.m. to 12 p.m. Rookie Orientation and Refresher Tests took place from 12 p.m. to 2 p.m. The track was then open to all cars from 2 p.m. to 6 p.m.

- Weather: 64 °F (18 °C); Mostly cloudy early, fair late
- Summary: The first veteran session began as scheduled at 10:05 a.m. A total of 24 drivers turned laps during the session, with Josef Newgarden running fastest at 223.415 mph (359.552 km/h). One minor incident occurred during the session, when Romain Grosjean collided with a bird, bringing out a caution for debris, and causing some clean up of his car to be needed.

The Rookie Orientation and Refresher Test session began immediately following the veteran's test, with nine drivers scheduled to participate. Jack Harvey, Ed Carpenter, Ryan Hunter-Reay, and Hélio Castroneves completed their veteran refresher tests, while Caio Collet, Jacob Abel, and Mick Schumacher completed all three phases of their rookie tests. Dennis Hauger completed phases 1 and 2 of his rookie test, and was given permission to complete the final phase during the full-field session later in the afternoon. Katherine Legge, the final driver required to complete a refresher test, experienced clutch problems and was unable to complete any laps at speed. As a result, she was not permitted to participate in the full-field session.

The full-field test session began at 2:00 p.m., with the track open until 6:00 p.m. Conor Daly set the fastest speed of the day, running a lap at 225.394 mph (362.736 km/h) late in the day. His teammate Jack Harvey ran the fastest "no-tow" lap — a lap without the assistance of aerodynamic drafting — at 220.318 mph (354.567 km/h). Only one incident was reported. At 5:34 p.m., Christian Rasmussen came to a stop on track at the exit of turn 2 with a loose right-rear wheel. The car was undamaged, but needed to be towed off of the race track.

Top speeds
Pos	No.	Driver	Team	Engine	Speed (mph)	Speed (km/h)
1	23	(United States) Conor Daly	Dreyer & Reinbold Racing	Chevrolet	225.394	362.736
2	06	(Brazil) Hélio Castroneves	Meyer Shank Racing	Honda	225.200	362.424
3	75	(Japan) Takuma Sato	Rahal Letterman Lanigan Racing	Honda	224.800	361.781

=== Open Test Day 2 — Wednesday April 29 ===
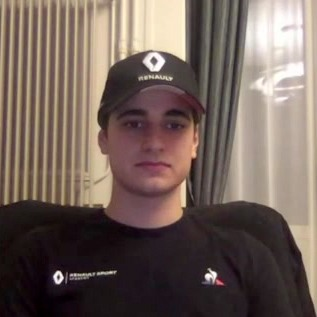
Caio Collet (pictured in 2020) was fastest on Day 2 of the Open Test.

The morning session was originally scheduled for 10 a.m. to 12 p.m. and the afternoon session was scheduled for 1 p.m. to 5 p.m. An additional special session from 12 p.m. to 1 p.m. was announced the previous evening for Katherine Legge to complete her refresher test. However, overnight rain delayed the start of testing by one hour and fifteen minutes. The scheduled was revised, shifting the early session to 11:15 a.m. to 1:15 p.m. Legge's ROP session was moved to 1:15 p.m., and the afternoon session was changed to 2:15 p.m. to 5 p.m.

- Weather: 63 °F (17 °C); cloudy to mostly cloudy
- Summary: Day two of testing began at 11:15 a.m. after track drying from overnight rain was completed. Rookie driver Caio Collet was fastest during the morning session, running a lap at 226.381 mph (364.325 km/h). This lap would be the fastest of the day, as it was not matched during the afternoon session. Jack Harvey turned the fastest "no-tow" lap for the second day in a row during the morning session, running a lap at 221.112 mph (355.845 km/h).

From 1:15 p.m. to 2:15 p.m., the track was made available for Katherine Legge to complete her veteran refresher test. Legge successfully completed the refresher test, and was cleared to take part in further testing.

From 2:15 p.m. until 5:00 p.m. the track was open to all drivers. Josef Newgarden was fastest in the afternoon session, turning a lap at 225.617 mph (363.095 km/h). One significant incident occurred at 3:27 p.m. Jack Harvey suffered a major engine failure in turn four. The car billowed large amounts of smoke and briefly caught fire before Harvey brought the car to a stop in the pit lane. Earlier, at 2:58 p.m., a brief yellow came out after a fox ran across the track in turn one, and was narrowly missed by Takuma Sato.

Top speeds
Pos	No.	Driver	Team	Engine	Speed (mph)	Speed (km/h)
1	4	(Brazil) Caio Collet R	A. J. Foyt Racing	Chevrolet	226.381	364.325
2	2	(United States) Josef Newgarden	Team Penske	Chevrolet	226.223	364.071
3	10	(Spain) Álex Palou	Chip Ganassi Racing	Honda	225.272	362.540

== Practice ==
=== Opening Day — Tuesday May 12 ===
- Weather: 77 °F (25 °C), Fair
- Summary: The opening day of practice began at 12:00 p.m., with the track open until 6:00 p.m. Despite having handling issues early in the day, Álex Palou turned the fastest lap late in the session with a speed at 225.937 mph (363.610 km/h). Kyle Kirkwood turned the fastest "no-tow" lap with a speed of 222.062 mph (357.374 km/h). Palou came into the pits suddenly at 4:13 p.m. complaining of a problem in the right-rear. The car was wheeled back to the garage area where the crew partially tore it down to determine what was wrong. After short consultation, the car was wheeled back out, and Palou set his aforementioned fast lap. One notable mechanical failure occurred for Ed Carpenter, whose engine failed during his installation lap early in the session. The engine was changed, and Carpenter participated in running in the later part of practice.

There were no major incidents during the session. However, there were two yellows for track inspection due to cut tires. Hélio Castroneves and Graham Rahal both suffered punctures, but both were able to return to the pits without incident. After an engine issue, Scott McLaughlin's team was preparing to install a new engine in time for Wednesday's practice session.

Top speeds
Pos	No.	Driver	Team	Engine	Speed (mph)	Speed (km/h)
1	10	(Spain) Álex Palou	Chip Ganassi Racing	Honda	225.937	363.610
2	66	(New Zealand) Marcus Armstrong	Meyer Shank Racing	Honda	225.895	363.543
3	23	(United States) Conor Daly	Dreyer & Reinbold Racing	Chevrolet	225.838	363.451
Official Report

=== Practice — Wednesday May 13 ===
- Weather: 66 °F (19 °C), Mostly cloudy
- Summary: The track was once again open from 12:00 p.m. to 6:00 p.m. for Wednesday practice. The day saw significantly cooler temperatures and windier conditions than opening practice. Conor Daly ran the fastest lap of the day at 228.080 mph (367.059 km/h). Pato O'Ward turned the fastest "no-tow" lap at 221.409 mph (356.323 km/h). There were no major incidents reported. Two engine changes were reported on during the day. Scott McLaughlin's team changed the engine on his car overnight between Tuesday and Wednesday, while at the end of the day Alexander Rossi's team were reported to have started changing the engine on his car. These, combined with Ed Carpenter's engine failure the previous day, marked three Chevrolet engines needing to be changed in the first two days of practice.

Top speeds
Pos	No.	Driver	Team	Engine	Speed (mph)	Speed (km/h)
1	23	(United States) Conor Daly	Dreyer & Reinbold Racing	Chevrolet	228.080	367.059
2	10	(Spain) Álex Palou	Chip Ganassi Racing	Honda	228.026	366.972
3	12	(United States) David Malukas	Team Penske	Chevrolet	227.139	365.545
Official Report

=== Practice — Thursday May 14 ===
- Weather: 65 °F (18 °C), Fair
- Summary: Thursday practice ran from 12:00 p.m. to 6:00 p.m. With qualifying approaching, several teams began attempting qualifying simulations, despite cars not yet being permitted to have qualifying boost levels. Pato O'Ward turned the fastest lap of the day, running at 227.308 mph (365.817 km/h). The fastest "no-tow" lap came from Takuma Sato, who ran a lap at 223.828 mph (360.216 km/h) without aerodynamic drafting. There were no major incidents reported. There was a total of 1,469 laps logged by the 33 cars, the lowest day-total thus far for the week.

Top speeds
Pos	No.	Driver	Team	Engine	Speed (mph)	Speed (km/h)
1	5	(Mexico) Pato O'Ward	Arrow McLaren	Chevrolet	227.308	365.817
2	06	(Brazil) Hélio Castroneves	Meyer Shank Racing	Honda	226.977	365.284
3	66	(New Zealand) Marcus Armstrong	Meyer Shank Racing	Honda	226.841	365.065
Official Report

=== Fast Friday Practice — Friday May 15 ===
- Weather: 68 °F (20 °C), Morning rain, then cloudy in the afternoon turning to fair in late afternoon
- Summary: Practice was originally scheduled for 12 p.m. to 6 p.m. However, morning rain delayed the start until 2:00 p.m. Due to the delay, the session was extended by one hour to 7:00 p.m. For Fast Friday practice, teams were permitted to increase turbocharger boost pressures to qualifying levels – 1,500 mbar (44.3 inHg). With the increased boost levels, teams focused on simulated qualification running. Felix Rosenqvist ran the fastest lap of the day, with a lap at 233.372 mph (375.576 km/h). Rosenqvist also had the fastest four-lap run – a simulation of a four-lap qualifying run – with an average speed of 232.828 mph (374.700 km/h). Scott McLaughlin turned the fastest "no-tow" lap of the session at 232.674 mph (374.453 km/h), which was also the third fastest lap overall of the day. There were no major incidents reported. Another Chevrolet engine failure was reported, as Santino Ferrucci experienced a failure with 55 minutes left in the session.

After the session, the random draw to determine qualifying order was held in the Pagoda area. Scott Dixon drew the first spot in line.

Top speeds
Pos	No.	Driver	Team	Engine	Speed (mph)	Speed (km/h)
1	60	(Sweden) Felix Rosenqvist	Meyer Shank Racing	Honda	233.372	375.576
2	20	(United States) Alexander Rossi	ECR	Chevrolet	232.932	374.868
3	3	(New Zealand) Scott McLaughlin	Team Penske	Chevrolet	232.674	374.453
Official Report

== Time Trials ==
=== Saturday, May 16 ===
- Weather: 69 °F (21 °C), Scattered thunderstorms
- Summary: Persistent rain throughout the day prevented any track running on the scheduled first day of qualification. All qualifications were shifted to Sunday, and the scheduled "Fast 15" session was discarded in the revised condensed schedule.

=== Sunday, May 17 ===
- Weather: 83 °F (28 °C), Fair
- Summary: With the first day of qualification rained out, a revised schedule was announced for Sunday, with the scheduled "Top 15" session discarded. During the first session, which began at 12 p.m., all entries were given one guaranteed attempt. The cars qualifying in positions 1–12 in the first session advanced to the Top 12 session later in the day, while those in positions 13–33 were locked in to their positions. At 4 p.m., the Top 12 session was held, where the top six qualifiers advanced to the final Fast Six qualifying, while positions 7–12 were locked in to their positions. At 6:00 p.m., the Top Six session started, which determined the top six starting positions.

==== Pre-qualifying practice ====
A one-hour practice session was held before qualifying, beginning at 9:30 a.m. Only 14 entries turned laps during the session. One minor incident occurred when Takuma Sato drifted high in turn 3 and brushed the outside wall. The incident brought out a caution period, but Sato's car was not significantly damaged. Christian Rasmussen was the fastest in the session, turning a lap at 232.255 mph (373.778 km/h).

==== Full field qualifying ====
Full field qualifying began at noon. Felix Rosenqvist was the fastest in the session, running a four-lap average at 232.599 miles per hour (374.332 km/h). Rosenqvist was the only qualifier whose run was above 232 mph (373 km/h). Caio Collet was the fastest rookie qualifier at 231.419 mph (372.433 km/h), good enough for seventh fastest in the session. Collet was the only rookie to advance to the Top 12 session. Also advancing to the Top 12 session were David Malukas, Conor Daly, Scott McLaughlin, Rinus VeeKay, Alexander Rossi, Scott Dixon, Pato O'Ward, Santino Ferrucci, Álex Palou, and Kyffin Simpson.

Pos	No.	Driver	Team	Engine	Speed (mph)	Speed (km/h)
Top 12
1	60	(Sweden) Felix Rosenqvist	Meyer Shank Racing w/ Curb-Agajanian	Honda	232.599	374.332
2	12	(United States) David Malukas	Team Penske	Chevrolet	231.813	373.067
3	23	(United States) Conor Daly	Dreyer & Reinbold Racing	Chevrolet	231.744	372.956
4	3	(New Zealand) Scott McLaughlin	Team Penske	Chevrolet	231.623	372.761
5	76	(Netherlands) Rinus VeeKay	Juncos Hollinger Racing w/ Dreyer & Reinbold Racing	Chevrolet	231.591	372.710
6	20	(United States) Alexander Rossi W	ECR	Chevrolet	231.580	372.692
7	4	(Brazil) Caio Collet R	A. J. Foyt Racing	Chevrolet	231.419	372.433^{1}
8	9	(New Zealand) Scott Dixon W	Chip Ganassi Racing	Honda	231.411	372.420
9	5	(Mexico) Pato O'Ward	Arrow McLaren	Chevrolet	231.248	372.158
10	14	(United States) Santino Ferrucci	A. J. Foyt Racing	Chevrolet	231.224	372.119
11	10	(Spain) Álex Palou W	Chip Ganassi Racing	Honda	231.155	372.008
12	8	(Cayman Islands) Kyffin Simpson	Chip Ganassi Racing	Honda	231.095	371.911
Positions 13–33
13	75	(Japan) Takuma Sato W	Rahal Letterman Lanigan Racing	Honda	230.995	371.750
14	33	(United States) Ed Carpenter	ECR	Chevrolet	230.829	371.483
15	06	(Brazil) Hélio Castroneves W	Meyer Shank Racing w/ Curb-Agajanian	Honda	230.811	371.454
16	21	(Denmark) Christian Rasmussen	ECR	Chevrolet	230.705	371.284
17	66	(New Zealand) Marcus Armstrong	Meyer Shank Racing w/ Curb-Agajanian	Honda	230.701	371.277
18	28	(Sweden) Marcus Ericsson W	Andretti Global	Honda	230.667	371.223
19	7	(Denmark) Christian Lundgaard	Arrow McLaren	Chevrolet	230.661	371.213
20	26	(Australia) Will Power W	Andretti Global	Honda	230.279	370.598
21	6	(United States) Nolan Siegel	Arrow McLaren	Chevrolet	230.213	370.492
22	45	(United Kingdom) Louis Foster	Rahal Letterman Lanigan Racing	Honda	230.212	370.490
23	31	(United States) Ryan Hunter-Reay W	Arrow McLaren w/ Legacy Motor Club	Chevrolet	230.202	370.474
24	2	(United States) Josef Newgarden W	Team Penske	Chevrolet	230.165	370.415
25	18	(France) Romain Grosjean	Dale Coyne Racing	Honda	229.791	369.813
26	27	(United States) Kyle Kirkwood	Andretti Global	Honda	229.607	369.517
27	11	(United Kingdom) Katherine Legge	HMD Motorsports w/ A. J. Foyt Racing	Chevrolet	229.456	369.274
28	47	(Germany) Mick Schumacher R	Rahal Letterman Lanigan Racing	Honda	229.450	369.264
29	24	(United Kingdom) Jack Harvey	Dreyer & Reinbold Racing	Chevrolet	229.207	368.873^{1}
30	15	(United States) Graham Rahal	Rahal Letterman Lanigan Racing	Honda	229.017	368.567
31	19	(Norway) Dennis Hauger R	Dale Coyne Racing	Honda	228.982	368.511
32	51	(United States) Jacob Abel R	Abel Motorsports	Chevrolet	228.169	367.202
33	77	(United States) Sting Ray Robb	Juncos Hollinger Racing	Chevrolet	226.572	364.632
Official Report

- ^{1} The times set by Caio Collet and Jack Harvey were later disallowed due to technical infringements on both cars.

==== Top 12 qualifying ====
- Summary: The Top 12 session began just before 4:30 p.m. Drivers qualified in reverse order of how they had qualified in the previous full field session. Felix Rosenqvist was fastest in the Top 12 session at 232.065 mph (373.472 km/h). Álex Palou greatly improved from his first run, and was second fastest in the Top 12 session. David Malukas, Santino Ferrucci, Pato O'Ward, and Alexander Rossi concluded the top six, with all advancing to the final Fast Six session.

Pos	No.	Driver	Team	Engine	Speed (mph)	Speed (km/h)
Fast Six qualifiers
1	60	(Sweden) Felix Rosenqvist	Meyer Shank Racing w/ Curb-Agajanian	Honda	232.065	373.472
2	10	(Spain) Álex Palou W	Chip Ganassi Racing	Honda	231.665	372.829
3	12	(United States) David Malukas	Team Penske	Chevrolet	231.486	372.541
4	14	(United States) Santino Ferrucci	A. J. Foyt Racing	Chevrolet	231.098	371.916
5	5	(Mexico) Pato O'Ward	Arrow McLaren	Chevrolet	231.088	371.900
6	20	(United States) Alexander Rossi W	ECR	Chevrolet	231.005	371.767
Positions 7–12
7	8	(Cayman Islands) Kyffin Simpson	Chip Ganassi Racing	Honda	230.883	371.570
8	23	(United States) Conor Daly	Dreyer & Reinbold Racing	Chevrolet	230.712	371.295
9	3	(New Zealand) Scott McLaughlin	Team Penske	Chevrolet	230.577	371.078
10	4	(Brazil) Caio Collet R	A. J. Foyt Racing	Chevrolet	230.539	371.017^{1}
11	9	(New Zealand) Scott Dixon W	Chip Ganassi Racing	Honda	230.347	370.708
12	76	(Netherlands) Rinus VeeKay	Juncos Hollinger Racing w/ Dreyer & Reinbold Racing	Chevrolet	229.585	369.481
Official Report

- ^{1} The time set by Caio Collet was later disallowed due to a technical infringement on his car.

==== Fast Six Qualifying ====
- Summary: The Fast Six session began at 6:00 p.m. Drivers qualified in reverse order of their results from the Top 12 session. Álex Palou qualified on pole position with a four-lap average of 232.248 mph (373.767 km/h). It was Palou's second pole qualification at the Indianapolis 500. Alexander Rossi qualified second, securing his first front-row start since 2017, while David Malukas earned his first front row start with the third fastest time. Despite being fastest in both of the first two session, Felix Rosenqvist was unable to find the speed to challenge for pole, and was only fourth fastest.

Pos	No.	Driver	Team	Engine	Speed (mph)	Speed (km/h)
Positions 1–6
1	10	(Spain) Álex Palou W	Chip Ganassi Racing	Honda	232.248	373.767
2	20	(United States) Alexander Rossi W	ECR	Chevrolet	231.990	373.352
3	12	(United States) David Malukas	Team Penske	Chevrolet	231.877	373.170
4	60	(Sweden) Felix Rosenqvist	Meyer Shank Racing w/ Curb-Agajanian	Honda	231.375	372.362
5	14	(United States) Santino Ferrucci	A. J. Foyt Racing	Chevrolet	230.846	371.511
6	5	(Mexico) Pato O'Ward	Arrow McLaren	Chevrolet	230.442	370.860
Official Report

=== Post-qualifying penalties ===
Hours after qualifying ended, Indycar announced that the cars of Caio Collet and Jack Harvey had failed technical inspection due to using unapproved hardware for the Dallara-supplied energy management system. Both entries had their qualifying times disallowed, and were moved to the rear of the starting grid.

== Post-qualifying practice ==
=== Post-qualifying practice — Monday May 18 ===
- Weather: 81 °F (27 °C); Mostly cloudy turning to thunderstorms late
- Summary: A two-hour session was scheduled from 1 p.m. to 3 p.m. At 1:29 p.m., the first major incident of the month occurred. Alexander Rossi lost control and spun in turn two, and made heavy contact with the outside wall. Pato O'Ward spun in avoidance, but collided with Rossi's car. Behind them, Romain Grosjean lost control of his car while trying to slow for the incident, and also impacted the wall. All three drivers climbed from their cars under their own power, but Rossi was held for extended evaluation at the infield care center and was later transported to IU Methodist Hospital for further evaluation. Rossi was released later that night with finger and ankle injuries. He was not immediately cleared to drive again, but still intended to drive on Carb Day and race day. After cleanup, the session was resumed, but ultimately ended at 2:06 p.m. due to thunderstorms. Josef Newgarden was fastest in the session, running a lap at 226.198 mph (364.030 km/h).

Top practice speeds
Pos	No.	Driver	Team	Engine	Speed (mph)	Speed (km/h)
1	2	(United States) Josef Newgarden	Team Penske	Chevrolet	226.198	364.030
2	75	(Japan) Takuma Sato	Rahal Letterman Lanigan Racing	Honda	225.723	363.266
3	19	(Norway) Dennis Hauger R	Dale Coyne Racing	Honda	225.554	362.994
Official Report

=== Carb Day practice – Friday May 22 ===
- Weather: 67 °F (19 °C) Cloudy, light rain
- Summary: The two-hour final practice session was scheduled for 11 a.m. to 1 p.m. All 33 cars participated, including Alexander Rossi, who was cleared to drive after his crash on Monday. The field completed 2,169 laps without incident. Josef Newgarden, turned the fastest lap, while Scott Dixon completed the most laps (96). Despite rain in the forecast, the entire two-hour session was run to completion. Only one yellow occurred, when Marcus Ericsson was slow on the course with a loose rear wheel. Ericsson's car was wheeled back to the garage area, but he was able to return to the track later in the session.

Top practice speeds
Pos	No.	Driver	Team	Engine	Speed (mph)	Speed (km/h)
1	2	(United States) Josef Newgarden	Team Penske	Chevrolet	228.342	367.481
2	21	(Denmark) Christian Rasmussen	ECR	Chevrolet	227.474	366.084
3	12	(United States) David Malukas	Team Penske	Chevrolet	226.565	364.621
Official Report

== Carb Day events ==
=== Wienie 500 ===
The second annual Wienie 500 was held as part of Carb Day festivities. Six Oscar Mayer Wienermobiles, each representing a different regional hot dog variation, took part in a two-lap, 5-mile race from a standing start. For the 2026 event, Sonoran Dog was replaced by Corn Dog. Andy Richter served as the "Commander in Beef" and gave the command to start engines.

The #01 Chicago Dog took the lead at the start and led into turn one. As the field exited turn two and started down the backstretch, Chicago Dog threw a hard block on the #05 Seattle Dog, forcing it to the inside apron. The #03 Slaw Dog took the lead going into turn three, and led the first lap. Down the backstretch on lap 2, Chili Dog, Chicago Dog, and New York Dog went three-wide. The #02 New York Dog emerged as the leader. Down the frontstretch, Chili Dog attempted a slingshot pass on the outside, but came up short. New York Dog held on to win by about 3/4 length.

Finish	Grid	No.	Team	Region	Laps
1	5	02	New York Dog (red)	East	2
2	4	06	Chili Dog (brown)	South	2
3	1	03	Slaw Dog (purple)	Southeast	2
4	2	01	Chicago Dog (yellow)	Midwest	2
5	3	05	Seattle Dog (blue)	Northwest	2
6	6	04	Corn Dog (tan)	Nationwide	2

=== Pit Stop Challenge ===
The 47th annual Pit Stop Challenge was scheduled for Friday May 22, after the completion of Carb Day practice. For 2026, the event once again picked up sponsorship from Oscar Mayer and was officially the "Oscar Mayer $150,000 Pit Stop Challenge" for sponsorship reasons. The bracket was expanded back to 16 participants (with no byes), up from 14 the previous two years. The eligibility for participation in the event was as follows:

- Best average finish of the top five in each race's pit stop performance (2025 Indianapolis 500 through the 2026 Sonsio Grand Prix).
- Each full-time team is permitted to enter their highest-ranked entrant.
- Indy-only teams.
- Full-time teams may be invited to enter their next highest-ranked entrant.

The final round was scheduled to be a best-of-three series, for a $50,000 first prize. After five of the first-round matchups were completed, a light rain began to fall. The competition was halted to wait out the shower, but the rain began to fall harder, and the event was cancelled; it was the first Pit Stop Challenge to be cancelled due to rain since 2008.

Round 1
10	Álex Palou (Chip Ganassi Racing)	16.450
31	Ryan Hunter-Reay (Arrow McLaren)	12.9893
9	Scott Dixon (Chip Ganassi Racing)
2	Josef Newgarden (Team Penske)
28	Marcus Ericsson (Andretti Global)	13.1943
12	David Malukas (Team Penske)	14.2027
76	Rinus VeeKay (Juncos Hollinger)	12.3747
18	Romain Grosjean (Dale Coyne Racing)	14.0550
5	Pato O'Ward (Arrow McLaren)	13.296
26	Will Power (Andretti Global)	24.274
19	Dennis Hauger (Dale Coyne Racing)
47	Mick Schumacher; Rahal Letterman)
15	Graham Rahal; Rahal Letterman)
45	Louis Foster; Rahal Letterman)
21	Christian Rasmussen (ERC)
7	Christian Lundgaard (Arrow McLaren)

Quarterfinals
31	Ryan Hunter-Reay (Arrow McLaren)
2	Josef Newgarden (Team Penske)
28	Marcus Ericsson (Andretti Global)
76	Rinus VeeKay (Juncos Hollinger)
5	Pato O'Ward (Arrow McLaren)

Semifinals

Finals (best of 3)

== Starting grid ==
Row	Inside		Middle		Outside	
1	10	(Spain) Álex Palou W	20	(United States) Alexander Rossi W	12	(United States) David Malukas
2	60	(Sweden) Felix Rosenqvist	14	(United States) Santino Ferrucci	5	(Mexico) Pato O'Ward
3	8	(Cayman Islands) Kyffin Simpson	23	(United States) Conor Daly	3	(New Zealand) Scott McLaughlin
4	9	(New Zealand) Scott Dixon W	76	(Netherlands) Rinus VeeKay	75	(Japan) Takuma Sato W
5	33	(United States) Ed Carpenter	06	(Brazil) Hélio Castroneves W	21	(Denmark) Christian Rasmussen
6	66	(New Zealand) Marcus Armstrong	28	(Sweden) Marcus Ericsson W	7	(Denmark) Christian Lundgaard
7	26	(Australia) Will Power W	6	(United States) Nolan Siegel	45	(United Kingdom) Louis Foster
8	31	(United States) Ryan Hunter-Reay W	2	(United States) Josef Newgarden W	18	(France) Romain Grosjean
9	27	(United States) Kyle Kirkwood	11	(United Kingdom) Katherine Legge	47	(Germany) Mick Schumacher R
10	15	(United States) Graham Rahal	19	(Norway) Dennis Hauger R	51	(United States) Jacob Abel R
11	77	(United States) Sting Ray Robb	4	(Brazil) Caio Collet R	24	(United Kingdom) Jack Harvey

Caio Collet (10th) and Jack Harvey (29th) were moved to the rear of the grid due to technical infractions found during post-qualifying inspection.
R Indianapolis 500 rookie
W Indianapolis 500 winner

== Race report ==
- Weather 72 °F (22 °C), Cloudy with occasional light rain.

=== First half ===
At the start of the race, Alexander Rossi moved in to the lead ahead of pole sitter Álex Palou. The two then exchanged the lead between themselves for the opening several laps. At lap 18, the Fox broadcast did a silent lap for Kyle Busch, but it was interrupted by the first caution of the race when Ryan Hunter-Reay spun in turn two and made contact with the wall. Katherine Legge also spun to try to avoid Hunter-Reay and impacted the inside wall on the backstraight. During the yellow, most of the field made their first pit stops. Palou emerged first of those that pitted, while Rossi suffered a slow pitstop and dropped farther down in the running order. Rinus VeeKay, Romain Grosjean, and Caio Collet did not pit, and moved to the lead of the race. Racing resumed at lap 26, with Grosjean moving to the lead of the race. Behind them, Ed Carpenter lost control of his car in turn one after being three-wide with Takuma Sato, resulting in him impacting the outside wall and bringing out the race's second caution period.

Racing resumed at lap 31, with Collet briefly taking the lead before those that had not stopped at the first caution needed to pit. Palou moved back in to the lead, and began to cycle with Conor Daly. At the next round of stops, Felix Rosenqvist moved in to second place, while Palou held the lead. A few laps later, Scott Dixon passed Rosenqvist for second, and Palou and Dixon began to exchange the lead between each other, working as teammates to try to hold the lead. At lap 92, the third caution of the race came as Will Power suffered a mechanical failure and spun on the pit lane exit lane on the fluid left by the car. Power did not make contact with any walls, but was out of the race. At the same time as the caution came, Alexander Rossi came to a stop on pit lane with the car briefly catching fire. Rossi was also out of the race. The entire field made pit stops during the caution period, with Dixon emerging in the lead ahead of Palou and Josef Newgarden, while David Malukas was fourth. The caution period was extended due to small amounts of rain at the north end of the track. At lap 105, the race was briefly stopped to allow the rain to pass.

=== Second half ===
Once the rain passed, the race resumed under yellow. The green flag was shown again at lap 110, with Palou and Malukas jumping ahead of Dixon at the restart. Conor Daly moved up to third position, while Palou and Malukas exchanged the lead ahead. At lap 116, the caution came out again for a brief rain shower, but no race stoppage was needed. Racing resumed at lap 124, but almost immediately the caution was needed again, as Josef Newgarden spun in turn four and heavily impacted the outside wall. During this caution, several drivers elected to pit, most notably Felix Rosenqvist, Pato O'Ward, and Marcus Armstrong, which put them on an alternate strategy to the other leaders.

Racing resumed at lap 132, with the leaders going four-wide in to turn one passing Malukas. Conor Daly emerged as the leader, with Scott McLaughlin and Palou behind. Both McLaughlin and Palou passed Daly later and began to exchange the lead, but at lap 147 Malukas moved his way back in to the lead. Soon after, all leaders pitted, which moved Rosenqvist and O'Ward on the alternate strategy to the lead. O'Ward and Rosenqvist pitted with 36 and 34 laps to go respectively, handing the lead back to the battling Malukas and Palou, but eliminating their final pit stops while Malukas and Palou would still need to pit. Beginning at lap 175, the leading cars of the primary strategy pitted, giving the lead initially to O'Ward, but on lap 185 Rosenqvist moved in to the lead and began pulling away, while Malukas and Palou remained over 16 seconds behind after their final stops.

==== Finish ====
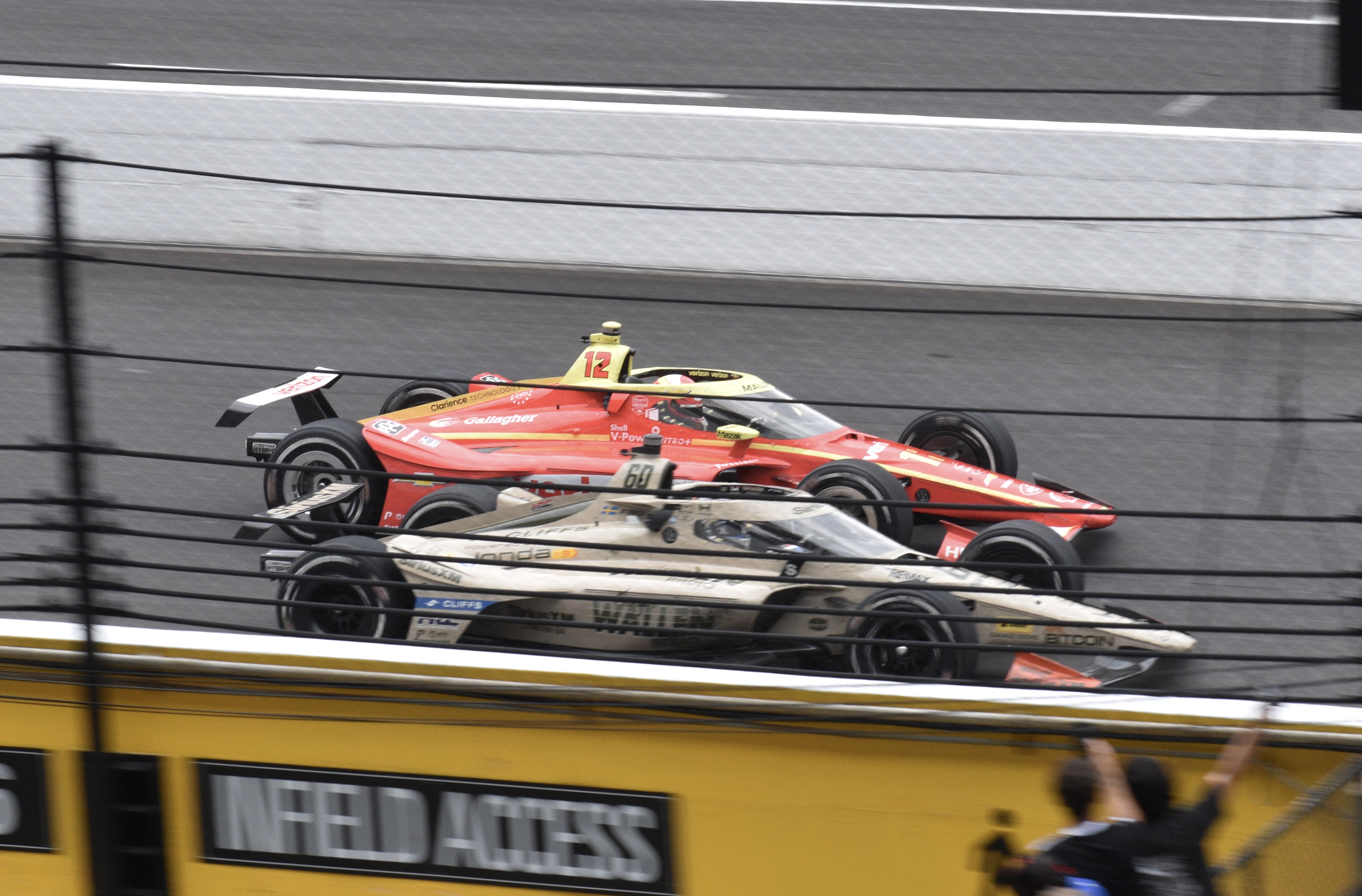
Felix Rosenqvist (no. 60) passing David Malukas on the final straightaway to take victory.

On lap 192, the sixth caution of the race came as Caio Collet collided with the outside wall in turn two. IndyCar officials chose to stop the race to allow Collet's car to be removed and attempt to ensure a green-flag finish. After clearing Collet's car, the race resumed under caution. On lap 196, the green flag came out again, with Marcus Armstrong, who had been running third on the same strategy as Rosenqvist, moving in to the lead, while David Malukas moved in the second ahead of Rosenqvist. Behind them, Mick Schumacher drifted wide in turn one and brushed the outside wall, bringing out the race's seventh and final caution. Schumacher's car was not severely damaged and he continued driving, allowing IndyCar to clear the track quickly and have a one-lap shootout to finish. The green and white came out on lap 200, with Malukas jumping to the lead, while Rosenqvist ran around the outside of Armstrong. Rosenqvist and Armstrong remained side-by-side through the whole lap until turn four, when Rosenqvist moved ahead. Despite having been side-by-side, Rosenqvist was still able to generate a run on Malukas, and in a photo-finish Rosenqvist pushed ahead to take victory. The final margin of victory was 0.0233 seconds, setting a new record for closest finish in Indianapolis 500, surpassing the old mark of 0.043 seconds that had been set in 1992. The race also saw 70 lead changes, setting a new record for most lead-changes in a single running of the race. For winning, Rosenqvist earned $4.34 million from a record purse of $30,906,400. Mick Schumacher was voted Rookie of the Year for his performance in the race.

==== Post-race penalties ====
During post race technical inspection, the car of Álex Palou was found to have violated rules regarding maximum height for wing end plates. The team maintained their finishing position in the race, but were penalized five points in both the driver's and owner's championship and also given a $10,000 fine.

== Box score ==
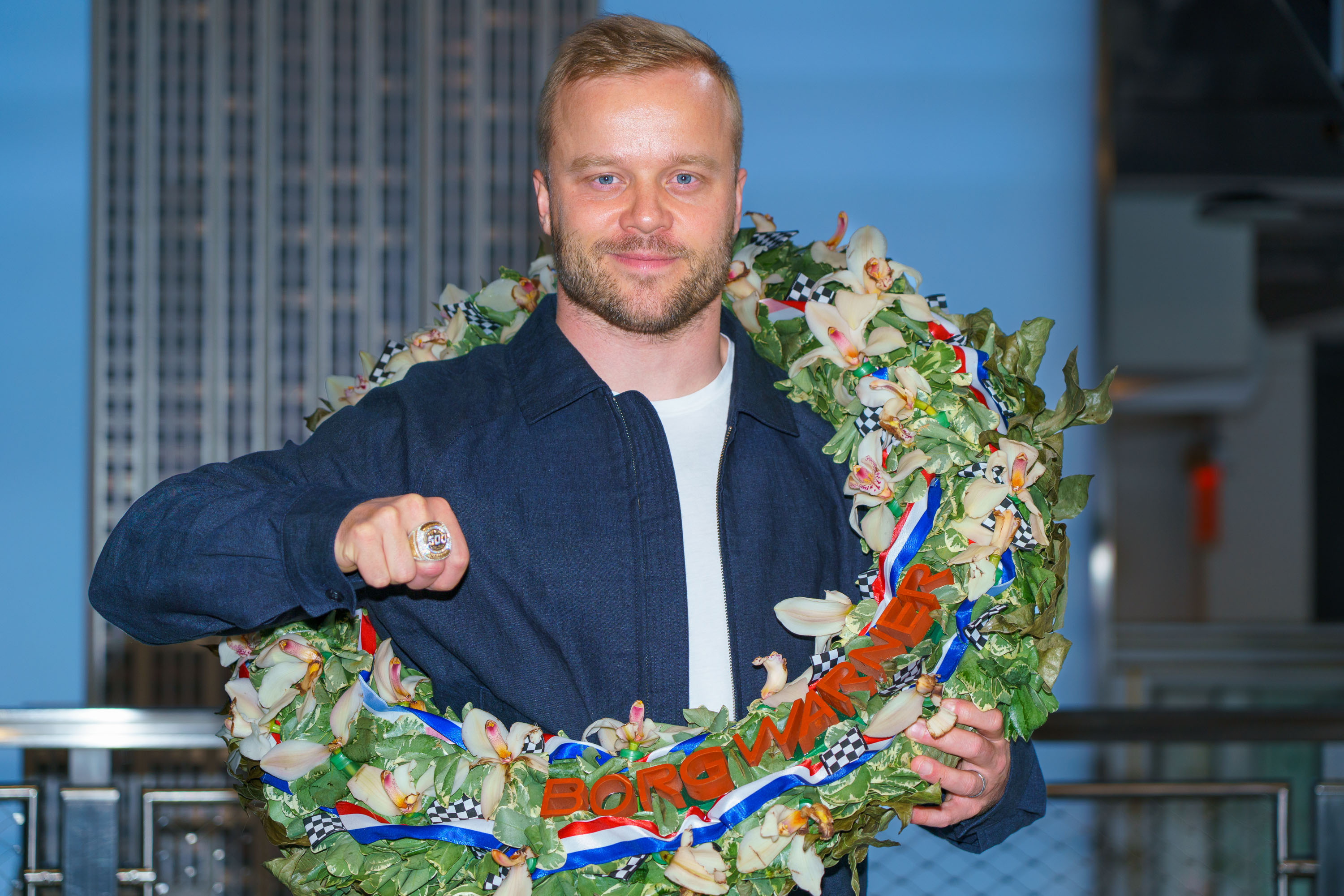
Felix Rosenqvist at the Empire State Building following his victory

Finish	No.	Driver	Team	Chassis	Engine	Laps	Status	Pit Stops	Grid	Pts.^{1}
1	60	(Sweden) Felix Rosenqvist	Meyer Shank Racing with Curb-Agajanian	Dallara UAK18	Honda	200	3:05:09.6471	6	4	60
2	12	(United States) David Malukas	Team Penske	Dallara UAK18	Chevrolet	200	+0.0233	6	3	51
3	3	(New Zealand) Scott McLaughlin	Team Penske	Dallara UAK18	Chevrolet	200	+0.4205	6	9	40
4	5	(Mexico) Pato O'Ward	Arrow McLaren	Dallara UAK18	Chevrolet	200	+0.4271	6	6	40
5	66	(New Zealand) Marcus Armstrong	Meyer Shank Racing with Curb-Agajanian	Dallara UAK18	Honda	200	+0.4360	6	16	31
6	76	(Netherlands) Rinus VeeKay	Juncos Hollinger Racing with Dreyer & Reinbold Racing	Dallara UAK18	Chevrolet	200	+1.0760	6	11	31
7	10	(Spain) Álex Palou W	Chip Ganassi Racing	Dallara UAK18	Honda	200	+1.0946	6	1	36
8	14	(United States) Santino Ferrucci	A.J. Foyt Racing	Dallara UAK18	Chevrolet	200	+1.5751	6	5	32
9	18	(France) Romain Grosjean	Dale Coyne Racing	Dallara UAK18	Chevrolet	200	+2.0730	8	24	23
10	75	(Japan) Takuma Sato W	Rahal Letterman Lanigan Racing	Dallara UAK18	Honda	200	+2.4507	6	12	20
11	6	(United States) Nolan Siegel	Arrow McLaren	Dallara UAK18	Chevrolet	200	+2.6776	6	20	19
12	23	(United States) Conor Daly	Dreyer & Reinbold Racing	Dallara UAK18	Chevrolet	200	+2.7237	6	8	24
13	28	(Sweden) Marcus Ericsson W	Andretti Global	Dallara UAK18	Honda	200	+3.3215	6	17	17
14	8	(Cayman Islands) Kyffin Simpson	Chip Ganassi Racing	Dallara UAK18	Honda	200	+3.8061	6	7	23
15	9	(New Zealand) Scott Dixon W	Chip Ganassi Racing	Dallara UAK18	Honda	200	+3.8431	6	10	19
16	27	(United States) Kyle Kirkwood	Andretti Global	Dallara UAK18	Honda	200	+5.2271	6	25	14
17	7	(Denmark) Christian Lundgaard	Arrow McLaren	Dallara UAK18	Chevrolet	200	+6.3017	7	18	13
18	47	(Germany) Mick Schumacher R	Rahal Letterman Lanigan Racing	Dallara UAK18	Honda	200	+14.9305	8	27	12
19	19	(Norway) Dennis Hauger R	Dale Coyne Racing	Dallara UAK18	Honda	199	-1 Lap	6	29	11
20	15	(United States) Graham Rahal	Rahal Letterman Lanigan Racing	Dallara UAK18	Honda	199	-1 Lap	8	28	10
21	45	(United Kingdom) Louis Foster	Rahal Letterman Lanigan Racing	Dallara UAK18	Honda	199	-1 Lap	6	21	9
22	24	(United Kingdom) Jack Harvey	Dreyer & Reinbold Racing	Dallara UAK18	Chevrolet	199	-1 Lap	10	33	8
23	77	(United States) Sting Ray Robb	Juncos Hollinger Racing	Dallara UAK18	Chevrolet	199	-1 Lap	8	31	7
24	51	(United States) Jacob Abel R	Abel Motorsports	Dallara UAK18	Chevrolet	198	-2 Laps	9	30	6
25	06	(Brazil) Hélio Castroneves W	Meyer Shank Racing with Curb-Agajanian	Dallara UAK18	Honda	194	Mechanical	6	14	5
26	4	(Brazil) Caio Collet R	A.J. Foyt Racing	Dallara UAK18	Chevrolet	191	Contact	5	32	6
27	21	(Denmark) Christian Rasmussen	ECR	Dallara UAK18	Chevrolet	144	Mechanical	6	15	6
28	2	(United States) Josef Newgarden W	Team Penske	Dallara UAK18	Chevrolet	124	Contact	3	23	5
29	26	(Australia) Will Power W	Andretti Global	Dallara UAK18	Honda	91	Mechanical	2	19	5
30	20	(United States) Alexander Rossi W	ECR	Dallara UAK18	Chevrolet	91	Mechanical	3	2	17
31	33	(United States) Ed Carpenter	ECR	Dallara UAK18	Chevrolet	26	Contact	1	13	5
32	31	(United States) Ryan Hunter-Reay W	Arrow McLaren with Legacy Motor Club	Dallara UAK18	Chevrolet	17	Contact	0	22	5
33	11	(United Kingdom) Katherine Legge	HMD Motorsports with A. J. Foyt Racing	Dallara UAK18	Chevrolet	17	Contact	0	26	5
Box Score

W Former Indianapolis 500 winner

R Indianapolis 500 Rookie

All entrants utilized Firestone tires.

- ^{1} Points include qualification points from time trials, 1 point for leading a lap, and 2 points for most laps led.

=== Race statistics ===
Lap Leaders
Laps	Leader
1	Alexander Rossi
2–4	Álex Palou
5	Alexander Rossi
6	Álex Palou
7	Alexander Rossi
8	Álex Palou
9	Alexander Rossi
10–11	Álex Palou
12	Alexander Rossi
13–16	Álex Palou
17	Alexander Rossi
18–19	Álex Palou
20–25	Rinus VeeKay
26	Romain Grosjean
27–28	Rinus VeeKay
29–30	Romain Grosjean
31–39	Caio Collet
40	Conor Daly
41–61	Álex Palou
62	Scott Dixon
63–65	Christian Rasmussen
66–68	Álex Palou
69	Scott Dixon
70–71	Álex Palou
72	Scott Dixon
73	Álex Palou
74	Scott Dixon
75	Álex Palou
76	Scott Dixon
77	Álex Palou
78	Scott Dixon
79	Álex Palou
80	Scott Dixon
81	Álex Palou
82	Scott Dixon
83	Álex Palou
84	Scott Dixon
85	Álex Palou
86	Scott Dixon
87	Álex Palou
88	Scott Dixon
89	Álex Palou
90	Scott Dixon
91	Álex Palou
92–109	Scott Dixon
110	David Malukas
111	Álex Palou
112	David Malukas
113	Álex Palou
114–131	David Malukas
132–133	Conor Daly
134	Scott McLaughlin
135	Álex Palou
136	Scott McLaughlin
137	Conor Daly
138–139	Scott McLaughlin
140	Álex Palou
141	Scott McLaughin
142–145	Álex Palou
146	David Malukas
147	Álex Palou
148–149	Scott Dixon
150–153	Kyffin Simpson
154–166	Felix Rosenqvist
167–174	David Malukas
175	Álex Palou
176–184	Pato O'Ward
185–195	Felix Rosenqvist
196–198	Marcus Armstrong
199	David Malukas
200	Felix Rosenqvist
Box Score

Total laps led
Driver	Laps
Álex Palou	59
Scott Dixon	32
David Malukas	30
Felix Rosenqvist	25
Pato O'Ward	9
Caio Collet	9
Rinus VeeKay	8
Alexander Rossi	6
Scott McLaughlin	5
Conor Daly	4
Kyffin Simpson	4
Marcus Armstrong	3
Romain Grosjean	3
Christian Rasmussen	3
Box Score

Cautions: 7 for 51 laps
Laps	Reason
18–25	Hunter-Reay and Legge crash in turn 2
27–30	Carpenter crash in turn 1
92–108	Power spin in turn 1; Conditions (rain); Red flag on lap 105 (8:45)
116–124	Conditions (Rain)
125–131	Newgarden crash in turn 4
192–195	Collet crash in turn 2 Red flag on lap 193 (9:30)
197–198	Schumacher brushing the turn 2 wall
Box Score

== Broadcasting ==
=== Television ===
The race was televised live by Fox in the second year of a multi-year contract. On February 18, 2026, Fox announced their primary broadcast team for the IndyCar season, with Will Buxton serving as lead commentator and driver analysts James Hinchcliffe and Townsend Bell each returning from 2025.

On May 13, 2026, Indianapolis Motor Speedway president Doug Boles announced that due to an sellout of grandstand tickets, the traditional blackout in the Indianapolis media market would be lifted. Therefore, local Fox affiliate WXIN carried the live telecast; this was the sixth time the blackout had been lifted since live flag-to-flag coverage began in 1986.

On May 28, Fox announced that the race broadcast drew an average audience of 6.6 million viewers, with a peak of 8.349 million viewers between 4 p.m. and 4:15 p.m.

Fox
Booth announcers	Pre/Post-race	Pit reporters
Announcer: Will Buxton; Color: Townsend Bell; Color: James Hinchcliffe; Live in-car reports: Jack Harvey	Host: Chris Myers; Analyst: Tony Stewart; Analyst: Danica Patrick; Features: Tom Rinaldi	Georgia Henneberry; Kevin Lee; Jamie Little

=== Radio ===
The race was broadcast by the Indianapolis Motor Speedway Radio Network. The chief announcer was Mark Jaynes in his eleventh year as chief announcer, and 31st year overall with the network. Zach Veach served as the driver expert, replacing regular analyst Davey Hamilton, who served as the strategist for Jack Harvey's entry for Dreyer & Reinbold Racing. Gone was Chris Denari who retired after last years race and taking his place in turn 4 was Ryan Myrehn.

IMS Radio Network
Booth Announcers	Turn Reporters	Pit/garage reporters
Chief Announcer: Mark Jaynes; Driver analyst: Zach Veach (Carb Day, Race); Driver analyst: Callum Ilott (Time Trials)	Turn 1: Nick Yeoman; Turn 2: Michael Young; Turn 3: Jake Query; Turn 4: Ryan Myrehn	Alex Wollf; Rob Blackman; Jonathan Grace R Rich Nye

Previous race: 2026 Sonsio Grand Prix	IndyCar Series; 2026 season	Next race: 2026 Chevrolet Detroit Grand Prix
Previous race: 2025 Indianapolis 500	Indianapolis 500	Next race: 2027 Indianapolis 500
