= 2026 Sonsio Grand Prix =

Indycar race held in Speedway, Indiana

(United States) 2026 Sonsio Grand Prix
Race details
6th round of the 2026 IndyCar season
← Previous race	Next race →
- Layout of the Indianapolis Motor Speedway Road Course
- Date: May 9, 2026
- Official name: Sonsio Grand Prix
- Location: Indianapolis Motor Speedway, Speedway, Indiana
- Course: Permanent road course 2.439 mi / 3.925 km
- Distance: 85 laps 207.315 mi / 333.641 km

Pole position
- Driver: (Spain) Álex Palou (Chip Ganassi Racing)
- Time: 1:10.2962

Fastest lap
- Driver: (Spain) Álex Palou (Chip Ganassi Racing)
- Time: 1:12.1221 (on lap of 85)

Podium
- First: (Denmark) Christian Lundgaard (Arrow McLaren)
- Second: (United States) David Malukas (Team Penske)
- Third: (United States) Graham Rahal (Rahal Letterman Lanigan Racing)

Chronology
Previous	Next
2025	2027

The 2026 Sonsio Grand Prix was the sixth round of the 2026 IndyCar season. The race was held on May 9, 2026, in Speedway, Indiana at the Indianapolis Motor Speedway, a 2.43-mile, 14-turn roval, and ran for 90 laps. Christian Lundgaard won the race. David Malukas finished 2nd, and Graham Rahal finished 3rd.

== Race background ==
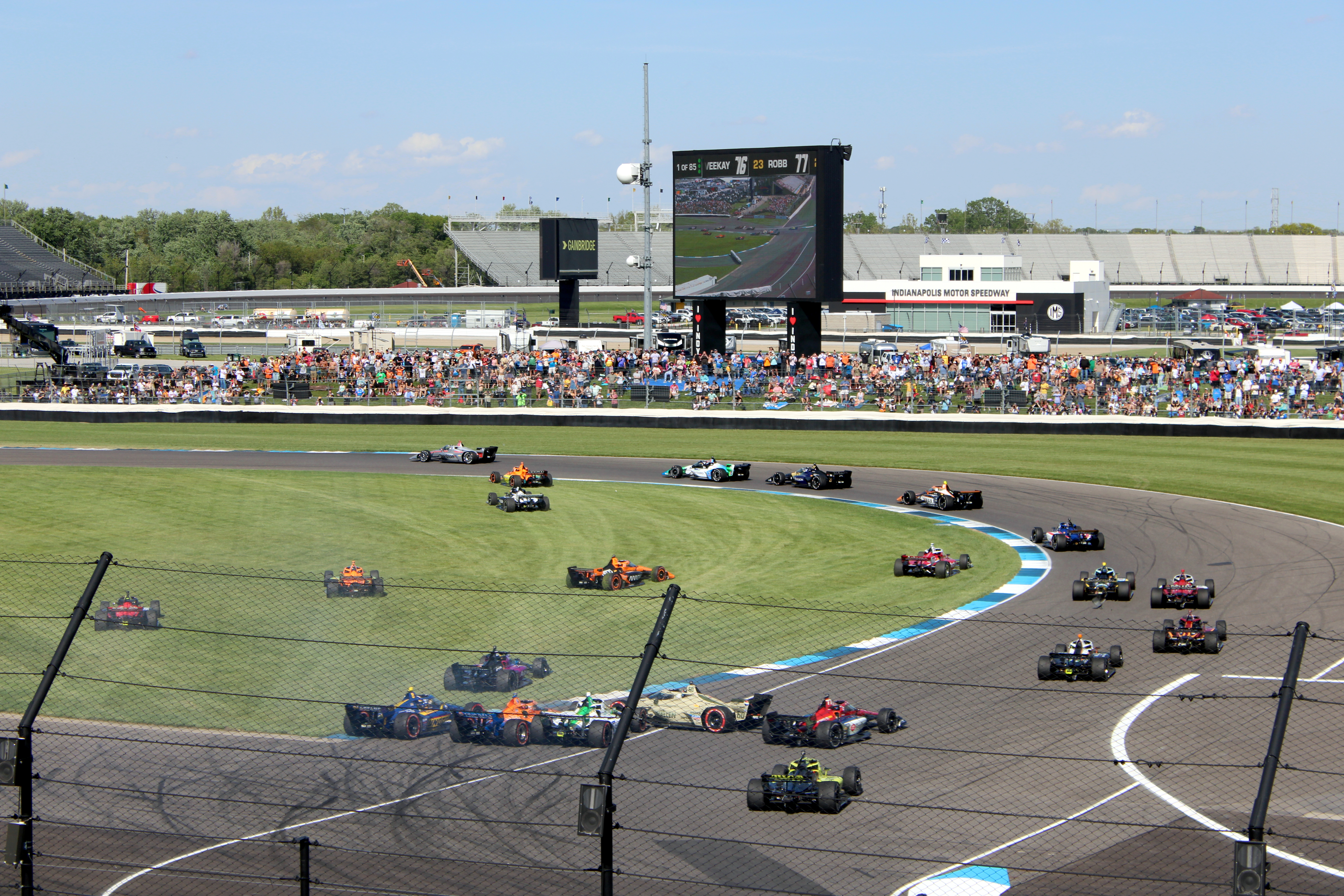
The start of the 2026 Sonsio Grand Prix

The Sonsio Grand Prix, commonly called the Grand Prix of Indianapolis, is held at the Indianapolis Motor Speedway on its 14-turn infield road course. A 2.73-mile (4.39 km) paved track. First held in 2014, it is currently a points-paying race of the NTT IndyCar Series. The event is contested by "Indy cars", a formula of professional-level, single-seat, open cockpit, open-wheel, purpose-built race cars. The race is traditionally held before the most prestigious event of the IndyCar calendar, and one of the oldest and most important automobile races in the world, the Indianapolis 500. Previously, the old road course layout was used for the Formula One United States Grand Prix.

== Entry list ==
Key	Meaning
R	Rookie
W	Past winner

Note

- Past winners include all IndyCar events at the Indianapolis Motor Speedway road course, not only the spring race

No.	Driver	Team	Engine
2	(United States) Josef Newgarden W	Team Penske	Chevrolet
3	(New Zealand) Scott McLaughlin	Team Penske	Chevrolet
4	(Brazil) Caio Collet R	A.J. Foyt Racing	Chevrolet
5	(Mexico) Pato O'Ward	Arrow McLaren	Chevrolet
6	(United States) Nolan Siegel	Arrow McLaren	Chevrolet
7	(Denmark) Christian Lundgaard	Arrow McLaren	Chevrolet
8	(Cayman Islands) Kyffin Simpson	Chip Ganassi Racing	Honda
9	(New Zealand) Scott Dixon W	Chip Ganassi Racing	Honda
10	(Spain) Álex Palou W	Chip Ganassi Racing	Honda
12	(United States) David Malukas	Team Penske	Chevrolet
14	(United States) Santino Ferrucci	A. J. Foyt Racing	Chevrolet
15	(United States) Graham Rahal	Rahal Letterman Lanigan Racing	Honda
18	(France) Romain Grosjean	Dale Coyne Racing	Honda
19	(Norway) Dennis Hauger R	Dale Coyne Racing	Honda
20	(United States) Alexander Rossi W	ECR	Chevrolet
21	(Denmark) Christian Rasmussen	ECR	Chevrolet
26	(Australia) Will Power W	Andretti Global	Honda
27	(United States) Kyle Kirkwood	Andretti Global with Curb-Agajanian	Honda
28	(Sweden) Marcus Ericsson	Andretti Global	Honda
45	(United Kingdom) Louis Foster	Rahal Letterman Lanigan Racing	Honda
47	(Germany) Mick Schumacher R	Rahal Letterman Lanigan Racing	Honda
60	(Sweden) Felix Rosenqvist	Meyer Shank Racing with Curb-Agajanian	Honda
66	(New Zealand) Marcus Armstrong	Meyer Shank Racing with Curb-Agajanian	Honda
76	(Netherlands) Rinus VeeKay W	Juncos Hollinger Racing	Chevrolet
77	(United States) Sting Ray Robb	Juncos Hollinger Racing	Chevrolet

== Practice ==
=== Practice 1 ===
The first practice session was held on May 8, 2026, at 9:05 a.m. ET.

Top Practice Speeds
Pos	No.	Driver	Team	Engine	Lap Time
1	10	(Spain) Álex Palou W	Chip Ganassi Racing	Honda	1:10.2696
2	27	(United States) Kyle Kirkwood	Andretti Global	Honda	1:10.6474
3	28	(Sweden) Marcus Ericsson	Andretti Global	Honda	1:10.7580
Practice 1 results

=== Practice 2 ===
The second practice session was held on May 8, 2026, at 1:05 p.m. ET.

Top Practice Speeds
Pos	No.	Driver	Team	Engine	Lap Time
1	10	(Spain) Álex Palou W	Chip Ganassi Racing	Honda	1:10.4507
2	27	(United States) Kyle Kirkwood	Andretti Global	Honda	1:10.5574
3	45	(United Kingdom) Louis Foster	Rahal Letterman Lanigan Racing	Honda	1:10.7182
Practice 2 results

== Qualifying ==
Qualifying was originally scheduled to be held on May 8, 2026, at 5:35 p.m. ET but was moved to May 9, 2026, at 10:45 a.m. ET due to bad weather conditions. The warmup session was cancelled to make way for qualifying.

Classification
Pos	No.	Driver	Team	Engine	Time	Final grid
1	10	(Spain) Álex Palou W	Chip Ganassi Racing	Honda	1:09.7487	1
2	5	(Mexico) Pato O'Ward	Arrow McLaren	Chevrolet	1:10.2962	2
3	60	(Sweden) Felix Rosenqvist	Meyer Shank Racing	Honda	1:10.4548	3
4	7	(Denmark) Christian Lundgaard	Arrow McLaren	Chevrolet	1:10.4751	4
5	12	(United States) David Malukas	Team Penske	Chevrolet	1:10.5660	5
6	45	(United Kingdom) Louis Foster	Rahal Letterman Lanigan	Honda	1:10.9404	6
7	15	(United States) Graham Rahal	Rahal Letterman Lanigan Racing	Honda	1:10.4042	7
8	9	(New Zealand) Scott Dixon W	Chip Ganassi Racing	Honda	1:10.4142	8
9	27	(United States) Kyle Kirkwood	Andretti Global with Curb-Agajanian	Honda	1:10.4189	9
10	2	(United States) Josef Newgarden W	Team Penske	Chevrolet	1:10.4938	10
11	18	(France) Romain Grosjean	Dale Coyne Racing	Honda	1:10.4981	11
12	4	(Brazil) Caio Collet R	A.J. Foyt Enterprises	Chevrolet	1:10.6299	12
13	20	(United States) Alexander Rossi W	ECR	Chevrolet	1:10.7736	13
14	28	(Sweden) Marcus Ericsson	Andretti Global	Honda	1:10.3765	14
15	14	(United States) Santino Ferrucci	A.J. Foyt Enterprises	Chevrolet	1:10.8113	15
16	6	(United States) Nolan Siegel	Arrow McLaren	Chevrolet	1:10.4288	16
17	3	(New Zealand) Scott McLaughlin	Team Penske	Chevrolet	1:10.8281	17
18	47	(Germany) Mick Schumacher R	Rahal Letterman Lanigan Racing	Honda	1:10.4487	18
19	21	(Denmark) Christian Rasmussen	ECR	Chevrolet	1:10.8877	19
20	66	(New Zealand) Marcus Armstrong	Meyer Shank Racing with Curb-Agajanian	Honda	1:10.4742	20
21	76	(Netherlands) Rinus VeeKay W	Juncos Hollinger Racing	Chevrolet	1:11.0611	21
22	8	(Cayman Islands) Kyffin Simpson	Chip Ganassi Racing	Honda	1:10.4751	22
23	77	(United States) Sting Ray Robb	Juncos Hollinger Racing	Chevrolet	1:11.2029	23
24	19	(Norway) Dennis Hauger R	Dale Coyne Racing	Honda	1:10.5163	24
25	26	(Australia) Will Power W	Andretti Global	Honda	1:10.5701	25
Official results

Notes

- **Bold text** indicates the fastest time.

== Race ==
The race was held on May 9, 2026, at 4:55 p.m. ET.

Classification
Pos	No.	Driver	Team	Engine	Laps	Time/Retired	Pit Stops	Grid	Laps Led	Pts.
1	7	(Denmark) Christian Lundgaard	Arrow McLaren	Chevrolet	85	1:55:40.2894	3	4	20	51
2	12	(United States) David Malukas	Team Penske	Chevrolet	85	1:55:44.9607	3	5	27	43
3	15	(United States) Graham Rahal	Rahal Letterman Lanigan Racing	Honda	85	1:55:48.2036	3	7	-	35
4	2	(United States) Josef Newgarden W	Team Penske	Chevrolet	85	1:55:50.3186	3	10	-	32
5	10	(Spain) Álex Palou W	Chip Ganassi Racing	Honda	85	1:55:54.6524	3	1	23	32
6	9	(New Zealand) Scott Dixon W	Chip Ganassi Racing	Honda	85	1:56:07.1314	4	8	-	28
7	45	(United Kingdom) Louis Foster	Rahal Letterman Lanigan Racing	Honda	85	1:56:08.4163	3	6	-	26
8	19	(Norway) Dennis Hauger R	Dale Coyne Racing	Honda	85	1:56:12.2219	3	24	-	24
9	27	(United States) Kyle Kirkwood	Andretti Global with Curb-Agajanian	Honda	85	1:56:14.4832	3	9	-	22
10	6	(United States) Nolan Siegel	Arrow McLaren	Chevrolet	85	1:56:19.1331	3	16	-	20
11	66	(New Zealand) Marcus Armstrong	Meyer Shank Racing with Curb-Agajanian	Honda	85	1:56:26.7604	4	20	-	19
12	8	(Cayman Islands) Kyffin Simpson	Chip Ganassi Racing	Honda	85	1:56:30.4793	3	22	-	18
13	26	(Australia) Will Power W	Andretti Global	Honda	85	1:56:32.3181	3	25	15	18
14	14	(United States) Santino Ferrucci	A.J. Foyt Enterprises	Chevrolet	85	1:56:36.6602	3	15	-	16
15	76	(Netherlands) Rinus VeeKay W	Juncos Hollinger Racing	Chevrolet	85	1:56:39.8747	4	21	-	15
16	3	(New Zealand) Scott McLaughlin	Team Penske	Chevrolet	85	1:56:40.1597	4	17	-	14
17	77	(United States) Sting Ray Robb	Juncos Hollinger Racing	Chevrolet	85	1:56:40.4559	4	23	-	13
18	5	(Mexico) Pato O'Ward	Arrow McLaren	Chevrolet	85	1:56:46.5751	4	2	-	12
19	4	(Brazil) Caio Collet R	A.J. Foyt Enterprises	Chevrolet	85	1:56:47.9595	4	12	-	11
20	47	(Germany) Mick Schumacher R	Rahal Letterman Lanigan Racing	Honda	85	1:56:54.4186	3	18	-	10
21	18	(France) Romain Grosjean	Dale Coyne Racing	Honda	84	1:56:36.7538	4	11	-	9
22	28	(Sweden) Marcus Ericsson	Andretti Global	Honda	61	Mechanical	2	14	-	8
23	60	(Sweden) Felix Rosenqvist	Meyer Shank Racing with Curb-Agajanian	Honda	28	Contact	2	3	-	7
24	21	(Denmark) Christian Rasmussen	ECR	Chevrolet	28	Mechanical	2	19	-	6
25	20	(United States) Alexander Rossi W	ECR	Chevrolet	20	Mechanical	-	13	-	5
Fastest lap: (Spain) Álex Palou (Chip Ganassi Racing) – 1:12.1221 (Lap 42)
Official race results

== Championship standings after the race ==
Drivers' Championship standings

	Pos.	Driver	Points
Unchanged	1	(Spain) Álex Palou	237
Unchanged	2	(United States) Kyle Kirkwood	210
Unchanged	3	(United States) David Malukas	185
Plus	4	(Denmark) Christian Lundgaard	182
Minus	5	(United States) Josef Newgarden	162

Engine manufacturer standings

	Pos.	Manufacturer	Points
Unchanged	1	Honda	506
Unchanged	2	Chevrolet	450

- Note: Only the top five positions are included.

Previous race: 2026 Acura Grand Prix of Long Beach	IndyCar Series; 2026 season	Next race: 2026 Indianapolis 500
Previous race: 2025 Sonsio Grand Prix	Sonsio Grand Prix	Next race: 2027 Sonsio Grand Prix
