= 2026 Acura Grand Prix of Long Beach =

Indycar race held in Long Beach, California

(United States) 2026 Acura Grand Prix of Long Beach
Race details
5th round of the 2026 IndyCar season
← Previous race	Next race →
- Long Beach Street Circuit
- Date: April 19, 2026
- Official name: Acura Grand Prix of Long Beach
- Location: Long Beach Street Circuit
- Course: Temporary Street Circuit; 1.968 mi / 3.167 km
- Distance: 90 laps 177.12 mi / 285.05 km
- Weather: Clear 23 °C (73 °F)

Pole position
- Driver: (Sweden) Felix Rosenqvist (Meyer Shank Racing with Curb-Agajanian)
- Time: 1:07.4635

Fastest lap
- Driver: (United States) Josef Newgarden (Team Penske)
- Time: 1:08.8328 (on lap 18 of 90)

Podium
- First: (Spain) Álex Palou (Chip Ganassi Racing)
- Second: (Sweden) Felix Rosenqvist (Meyer Shank Racing with Curb-Agajanian)
- Third: (New Zealand) Scott Dixon (Chip Ganassi Racing)

Chronology
Previous	Next
2025	2027

The 2026 Acura Grand Prix of Long Beach was the fifth round of the 2026 IndyCar season. The race was held on April 19, 2026, in Long Beach, California at the Long Beach street circuit, a 1.97-mile, 11-turn temporary street circuit, and was run for 90 laps. Álex Palou won the race, followed by Felix Rosenqvist and Scott Dixon.

== Background ==
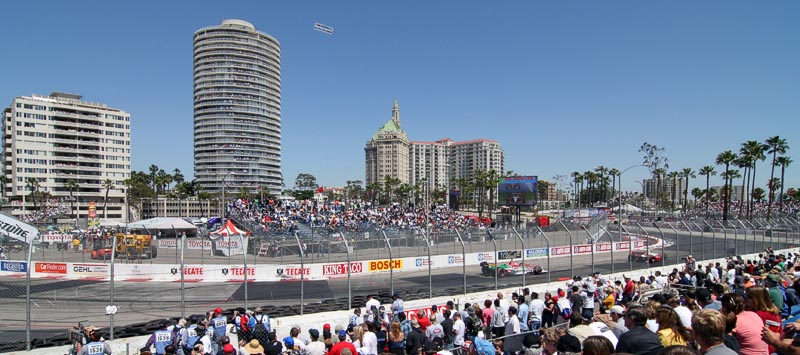
Racing action at the Long Beach Street Circuit in 2005, the track where the race was held.

The Streets of Long Beach is a street circuit, first run in 1975, located in Long Beach, California. The circuit hosts the Grand Prix of Long Beach as part of the IndyCar Series. It has also hosted races for IMSA SportsCar Championship, Formula One, Formula E, Championship Auto Racing Teams, American Le Mans Series, and Rolex Sports Car Series.

== Entry list ==
Key	Meaning
R	Rookie
W	Past winner

No.	Driver	Team	Engine
2	(United States) Josef Newgarden W	Team Penske	Chevrolet
3	(New Zealand) Scott McLaughlin	Team Penske	Chevrolet
4	(Brazil) Caio Collet R	A.J. Foyt Racing	Chevrolet
5	(Mexico) Pato O'Ward	Arrow McLaren	Chevrolet
6	(United States) Nolan Siegel	Arrow McLaren	Chevrolet
7	(Denmark) Christian Lundgaard	Arrow McLaren	Chevrolet
8	(Cayman Islands) Kyffin Simpson	Chip Ganassi Racing	Honda
9	(New Zealand) Scott Dixon W	Chip Ganassi Racing	Honda
10	(Spain) Álex Palou	Chip Ganassi Racing	Honda
12	(United States) David Malukas	Team Penske	Chevrolet
14	(United States) Santino Ferrucci	A. J. Foyt Racing	Chevrolet
15	(United States) Graham Rahal	Rahal Letterman Lanigan Racing	Honda
18	(France) Romain Grosjean	Dale Coyne Racing	Honda
19	(Norway) Dennis Hauger R	Dale Coyne Racing	Honda
20	(United States) Alexander Rossi W	ECR	Chevrolet
21	(Denmark) Christian Rasmussen	ECR	Chevrolet
26	(Australia) Will Power W	Andretti Global	Honda
27	(United States) Kyle Kirkwood W	Andretti Global with Curb-Agajanian	Honda
28	(Sweden) Marcus Ericsson	Andretti Global	Honda
45	(United Kingdom) Louis Foster	Rahal Letterman Lanigan Racing	Honda
47	(Germany) Mick Schumacher R	Rahal Letterman Lanigan Racing	Honda
60	(Sweden) Felix Rosenqvist	Meyer Shank Racing with Curb-Agajanian	Honda
66	(New Zealand) Marcus Armstrong	Meyer Shank Racing with Curb-Agajanian	Honda
76	(Netherlands) Rinus VeeKay	Juncos Hollinger Racing	Chevrolet
77	(United States) Sting Ray Robb	Juncos Hollinger Racing	Chevrolet

== Practice ==
=== Practice 1 ===
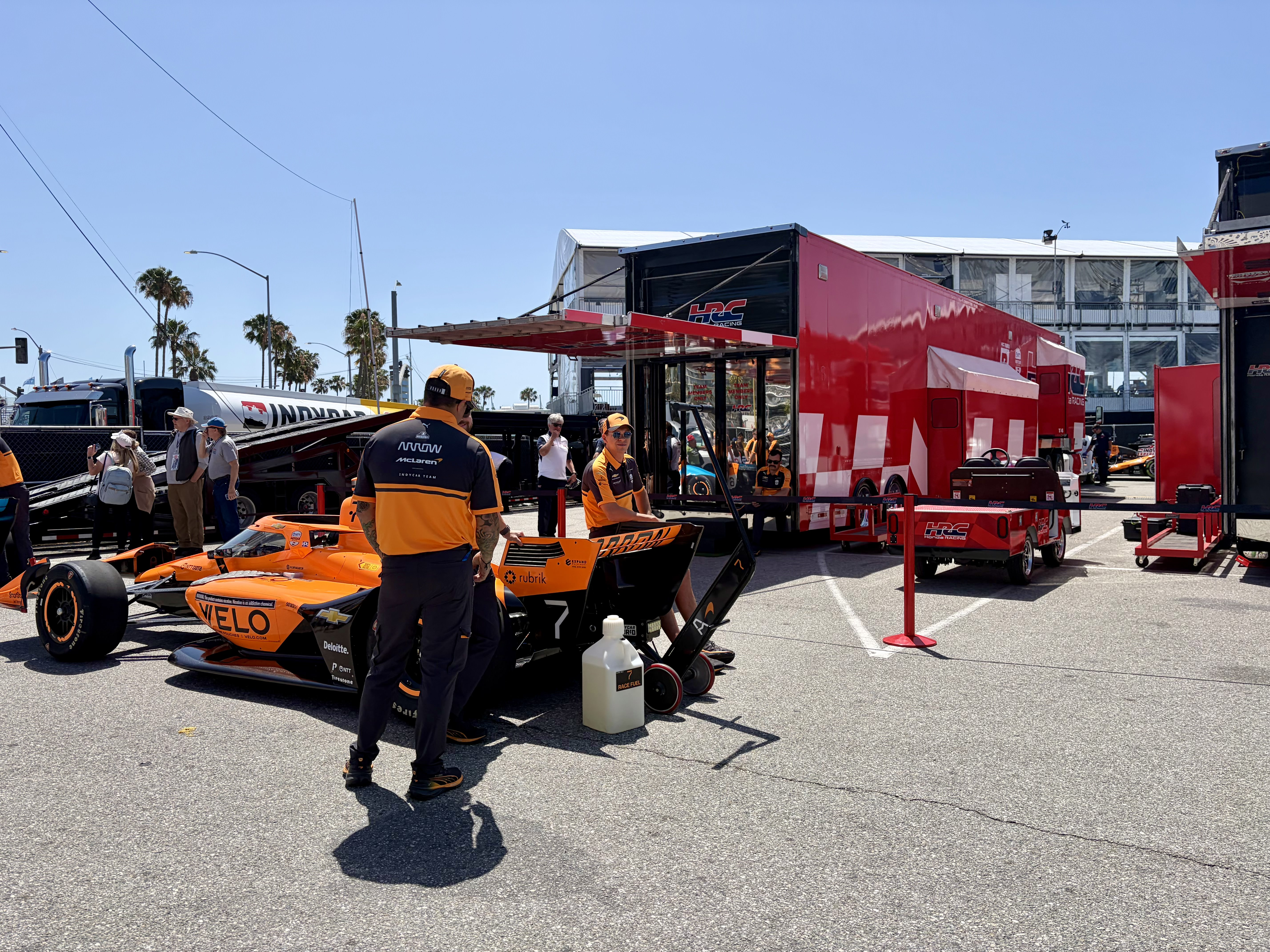
Practice 1, Arrow McLaren.

The first practice session was held on April 17, 2026.

Top Practice Speeds
Pos	No.	Driver	Team	Engine	Lap Time
1	26	(Australia) Will Power W	Andretti Global	Honda	1:07.6053
2	3	(New Zealand) Scott McLaughlin	Team Penske	Chevrolet	1:07.7914
3	27	(United States) Kyle Kirkwood W	Andretti Global	Honda	1:07.9861
Official results

=== Practice 2 ===
The second practice session was held on April 18, 2026.

Top Practice Speeds
Pos	No.	Driver	Team	Engine	Lap Time
1	27	(United States) Kyle Kirkwood W	Andretti Global	Honda	1:07.5417
2	12	(United States) David Malukas	Team Penske	Chevrolet	1:07.7750
3	5	(Mexico) Pato O'Ward	Arrow McLaren	Chevrolet	1:07.7919
Official results

== Qualifying ==
Qualifying was held on April 18, 2026.

Classification
Pos	No.	Driver	Team	Engine	Time	Final grid
1	60	(Sweden) Felix Rosenqvist	Meyer Shank Racing with Curb-Agajanian	Honda	1:07.4635	1
2	5	(Mexico) Pato O'Ward	Arrow McLaren	Chevrolet	1:07.5076	2
3	10	(Spain) Álex Palou	Chip Ganassi Racing	Honda	1:07.5289	3
4	27	(United States) Kyle Kirkwood W	Andretti Global with Curb-Agajanian	Honda	1:07.6199	4
5	12	(United States) David Malukas	Team Penske	Chevrolet	1:07.6508	5
6	9	(New Zealand) Scott Dixon W	Chip Ganassi Racing	Honda	1:07.8566	6
7	26	(Australia) Will Power W	Andretti Global	Honda	1:07.5163	7
8	3	(New Zealand) Scott McLaughlin	Team Penske	Chevrolet	1:07.6047	8
9	8	(Cayman Islands) Kyffin Simpson	Chip Ganassi Racing	Honda	1:07.6177	9
10	15	(United States) Graham Rahal	Rahal Letterman Lanigan Racing	Honda	1:07.6619	10
11	7	(Denmark) Christian Lundgaard	Arrow McLaren	Chevrolet	1:07.7218	11
12	76	(Netherlands) Rinus VeeKay	Juncos Hollinger Racing	Chevrolet	1:07.7283	12
13	66	(New Zealand) Marcus Armstrong	Meyer Shank Racing with Curb-Agajanian	Honda	1:07.7709	13
14	2	(United States) Josef Newgarden W	Team Penske	Chevrolet	1:07.7274	14
15	28	(Sweden) Marcus Ericsson	Andretti Global	Honda	1:07.8516	15
16	21	(Denmark) Christian Rasmussen	ECR	Chevrolet	1:07.8399	16
17	45	(United Kingdom) Louis Foster	Rahal Letterman Lanigan Racing	Honda	1:07.9024	17
18	20	(United States) Alexander Rossi W	ECR	Chevrolet	1:07.8756	18
19	19	(Norway) Dennis Hauger R	Dale Coyne Racing	Honda	1:08.2142	19
20	4	(Brazil) Caio Collet R	A.J. Foyt Enterprises	Chevrolet	1:07.9282	20
21	47	(Germany) Mick Schumacher R	Rahal Letterman Lanigan Racing	Honda	1:08.2471	21
22	14	(United States) Santino Ferrucci	A.J. Foyt Enterprises	Chevrolet	1:07.9340	22
23	18	(France) Romain Grosjean	Dale Coyne Racing	Honda	1:08.5474	23
24	77	(United States) Sting Ray Robb	Juncos Hollinger Racing	Chevrolet	1:08.2850	24
25	6	(United States) Nolan Siegel	Arrow McLaren	Chevrolet	1:08.6097	25
Official results

== Warmup ==
The warmup session was held on April 19, 2026.

Top Practice Speeds
Pos	No.	Driver	Team	Engine	Lap Time
1	2	(United States) Josef Newgarden W	Team Penske	Chevrolet	1:07.968
2	9	(New Zealand) Scott Dixon W	Chip Ganassi Racing	Honda	1:08.147
3	60	(Sweden) Felix Rosenqvist	Meyer Shank Racing with Curb-Agajanian	Honda	1:08.215
Official results

== Race ==
The race was held on April 19, 2026.

Classification
Pos	No.	Driver	Team	Engine	Laps	Time/Retired	Pit Stops	Grid	Laps Led	Pts.
1	10	(Spain) Álex Palou	Chip Ganassi Racing	Honda	90	1:49:09.5058	2	3	32	51
2	60	(Sweden) Felix Rosenqvist	Meyer Shank Racing with Curb-Agajanian	Honda	90	1:49:13.4721	2	1	51	44
3	9	(New Zealand) Scott Dixon W	Chip Ganassi Racing	Honda	90	1:49:14.9521	2	6	–	35
4	27	(United States) Kyle Kirkwood W	Andretti Global	Honda	90	1:49:15.4788	2	4	–	32
5	5	(Mexico) Pato O'Ward	Arrow McLaren	Chevrolet	90	1:49:21.3763	2	2	–	30
6	3	(New Zealand) Scott McLaughlin	Team Penske	Chevrolet	90	1:49:22.4117	2	8	–	28
7	12	(United States) David Malukas	Team Penske	Chevrolet	90	1:49:22.9895	2	5	–	26
8	15	(United States) Graham Rahal	Rahal Letterman Lanigan Racing	Honda	90	1:49:37.0732	2	10	–	24
9	20	(United States) Alexander Rossi W	ECR	Chevrolet	90	1:49:37.1403	2	18	–	22
10	8	(Cayman Islands) Kyffin Simpson	Chip Ganassi Racing	Honda	90	1:49:38.2344	2	9	–	20
11	19	(Norway) Dennis Hauger R	Dale Coyne Racing	Honda	90	1:49:38.4976	2	19	–	19
12	6	(United States) Nolan Siegel	Arrow McLaren	Chevrolet	90	1:49:39.4184	2	25	–	18
13	76	(Netherlands) Rinus VeeKay	Juncos Hollinger Racing	Chevrolet	90	1:49:40.0924	3	12	–	17
14	2	(United States) Josef Newgarden W	Team Penske	Chevrolet	90	1:49:40.3468	3	14	5	17
15	21	(Denmark) Christian Rasmussen	ECR	Chevrolet	90	1:49:40.6719	3	16	–	15
16	45	(United Kingdom) Louis Foster	Rahal Letterman Lanigan Racing	Honda	90	1:49:45.6694	2	17	–	14
17	47	(Germany) Mick Schumacher R	Rahal Letterman Lanigan Racing	Honda	90	1:49:46.4732	2	21	–	13
18	14	(United States) Santino Ferrucci	A.J. Foyt Enterprises	Chevrolet	90	1:49:50.3718	3	22	–	12
19	26	(Australia) Will Power W	Andretti Global	Honda	90	1:49:50.6898	2	7	2	12
20	7	(Denmark) Christian Lundgaard	Arrow McLaren	Chevrolet	90	1:49:51.6810	3	11	–	10
21	18	(France) Romain Grosjean	Dale Coyne Racing	Honda	90	1:49:52.3480	3	23	–	9
22	4	(Brazil) Caio Collet R	A.J. Foyt Enterprises	Chevrolet	90	1:49:53.1705	2	20	–	8
23	77	(United States) Sting Ray Robb	Juncos Hollinger Racing	Chevrolet	90	1:49:54.2094	3	24	–	7
24	66	(New Zealand) Marcus Armstrong	Meyer Shank Racing with Curb-Agajanian	Honda	89	1:49:10.4437	3	13	–	6
25	28	(Sweden) Marcus Ericsson	Andretti Global	Honda	38	Hybrid unit	1	15	–	5
Fastest lap: (United States) Josef Newgarden (Team Penske) – 1:08.8328 (Lap 18)
Official results

Notes

- **Bold text** indicates the fastest time.

== Championship standings after the race ==
Drivers' Championship standings

	Pos.	Driver	Points
Plus	1	(Spain) Álex Palou	205
Minus	2	(United States) Kyle Kirkwood	188
Plus	3	(United States) David Malukas	142
Plus	4	(Mexico) Pato O'Ward	136
Minus	5	(Denmark) Christian Lundgaard	131
Point standings

Engine manufacturer standings

	Pos.	Manufacturer	Points
Plus	1	Honda	440
Minus	2	Chevrolet	355
Point standings

- Note: Only the top five positions are included.

Previous race: 2026 Children's of Alabama Indy Grand Prix	IndyCar Series; 2026 season	Next race: 2026 Sonsio Grand Prix
Previous race: 2025 Acura Grand Prix of Long Beach	Acura Grand Prix of Long Beach	Next race: 2027 Acura Grand Prix of Long Beach
