= List of Indianapolis 500 fastest laps =

The following is a list of fastest laps for the Indianapolis 500. The fastest lap statistic has been officially kept for the Indianapolis 500 since 1950. The honor is held in somewhat minor prestige, and typically a cash prize is awarded to the driver who accomplishes the feat. However, it is typically considered a peripheral award, and no championship bonus points are currently awarded for fastest lap.

Since records have been kept, the fastest lap has been achieved by the leader on the final lap of the race on one occasion (Bobby Rahal, 1986). It has never been accomplished on the first lap of the race. It is commonly done by a driver not leading the race at the time, due to drafting.

== History ==
From 1950 to 1960, the Indianapolis 500 awarded points towards the Formula One World Drivers' Championship. During those eleven races, the driver setting the fastest lap received championship points towards the world title.

== Fastest lap chart ==
Year	Lap time	Lap Speed (mph)	Lap No.	Driver
1950	1:09.77	128.995		(United States) Johnnie Parsons
1951	1:07.26	133.809	23	(United States) Lee Wallard
1952	1:06.60	135.135	8	(United States) Bill Vukovich
1953	1:06.24	135.870	27	(United States) Bill Vukovich
1954	1:04.04	140.537	29	(United States) Jack McGrath
1955	1:03.67	141.354	27	(United States) Bill Vukovich
1956	1:02.32	144.416	19	(United States) Paul Russo
1957	1:02.75	143.426	127	(United States) Jim Rathmann
1958	1:02.37	144.300	55	(United States) Tony Bettenhausen
1959	1:01.89	145.419	64	(United States) Johnny Thomson
1960	1:01.59	146.128	4	(United States) Jim Rathmann
1961	1:00.98	147.589	91	(United States) Troy Ruttman
1962	1:00.69	148.295	56	(United States) Parnelli Jones
1963	59.39	151.541	114	(United States) Parnelli Jones
1964	57.09	157.646	15	(United States) Bobby Marshman
1965	57.14	157.508	2	(United States) A. J. Foyt
1966	56.54	159.179	18	(United Kingdom) Jim Clark
1967	54.57	164.926	6	(United States) Parnelli Jones
1968	53.36	168.666	94	(United States) Lloyd Ruby
1969	54.05	166.512	20	(United States) Roger McCluskey
1970	53.64	167.785	50	(United States) Joe Leonard
1971	51.44	174.961	66	(United States) Mark Donohue
1972	47.99	187.539	150	(United States) Mark Donohue
1973	48.15	186.916	55	(United States) Roger McCluskey
1974	47.02	191.408	2	(United States) Wally Dallenbach
1975	48.10	187.110	2	(United States) Gordon Johncock
1976	48.38	186.027	2	(United States) A. J. Foyt
1977	46.71	192.678	42	(United States) Danny Ongais
1978	46.41	193.924	75	(United States) Mario Andretti
1979	46.58	193.216	184	(United States) Mike Mosley
1980	47.35	190.074	149	(United States) Johnny Rutherford
1981	45.70	196.937	159	(United States) Gordon Johncock
1982	44.88	200.535	122	(United States) Rick Mears
1983	45.568	197.507	3	(Italy) Teo Fabi
1984	43.942	204.815	52	(United States) Gordon Johncock
1985	43.916	204.937	14	(United States) Rick Mears
1986	43.031	209.152	200	(United States) Bobby Rahal
1987	43.900	205.011	57	(Colombia) Roberto Guerrero
1988	42.956	209.517	166	(United States) Rick Mears
1989	40.455	222.469	85	(Brazil) Emerson Fittipaldi
1990	40.436 (Note: Emerson Fittipaldi and Arie Luyendyk tied for fastest lap to three decimal places.)	222.574	91; 162	(Brazil) Emerson Fittipaldi (Netherlands) Arie Luyendyk
1991	40.508	222.178	109	(Netherlands) Arie Luyendyk
1992	39.281	229.118	166	(United States) Michael Andretti
1993	41.898	214.807	198	(Brazil) Emerson Fittipaldi
1994	40.783	220.680	121	(Brazil) Emerson Fittipaldi
1995	40.177	224.009	179	(Canada) Scott Goodyear
1996	38.119	236.103	78	(United States) Eddie Cheever
1997	41.739	215.626	105	(United States) Tony Stewart
1998	41.908	214.746	19	(United States) Tony Stewart
1999	41.118	218.882	101	(United States) Greg Ray
2000	41.191	218.494	198	(United States) Buddy Lazier
2001	40.941	219.830	130	(United States) Sam Hornish Jr.
2002	39.735	226.499	20	(South Africa) Tomas Scheckter
2003	39.2692	229.187	100	(Brazil) Tony Kanaan
2004	41.2086	218.401	173	(Brazil) Vítor Meira
2005	39.4560	228.102	167	(Brazil) Tony Kanaan
2006	40.6778	221.251	41	(New Zealand) Scott Dixon
2007	40.2829	223.420	18	(Brazil) Tony Kanaan
2008	40.1720	224.037	161	(United States) Marco Andretti
2009	40.5325	222.044	187	(United Kingdom) Dario Franchitti
2010	39.9840	225.090	15	(Australia) Will Power
2011	40.0593	224.667	169	(United Kingdom) Dario Franchitti
2012	40.8771	220.172	59	(United States) Marco Andretti
2013	39.6580	226.940	185	(United Kingdom) Justin Wilson
2014	39.9661	225.191	182	(Colombia) Juan Pablo Montoya
2015	39.6979	226.712	102	(United States) Charlie Kimball
2016	39.9488	225.288	106	(United States) Alexander Rossi
2017	39.7896	226.190	150	(Japan) Takuma Sato
2018	40.1538	224.138	131	(Brazil) Hélio Castroneves
2019	39.8220	226.006	40	(New Zealand) Scott Dixon
2020	40.3290	223.164	66	(Canada) James Hinchcliffe
2021	39.5874	227.345	116	(United States) Santino Ferrucci
2022	40.0263	224.852	179	(Sweden) Marcus Ericsson
2023	39.8193	226.021	136	(United States) David Malukas
2024	39.7574	226.373	175	(Denmark) Christian Lundgaard
2025	39.7916	226.178	175	(Brazil) Hélio Castroneves
2026	39.9777	225.126	182	(United States) Conor Daly

All-time record race lap speed.
