= Fastest lap =

Quickest lap run during a race

In motorsports, the fastest lap is the quickest lap run during a race. In some racing series, like NASCAR, the fastest lap awards championship points for a driver or team. In Formula One and MotoGP no point is awarded for the fastest lap.

== Formula One ==
In Formula One, 141 different drivers have made fastest race laps. Michael Schumacher holds the record for the highest number of fastest laps with 77, followed by Lewis Hamilton with 70. Since 2007, the DHL Fastest Lap Award is given to the driver with the most fastest laps in a season.

Between 1950-1959 and 2019-2024, an extra point was given to the driver who recorded the fastest lap during a race. Between 2019 and 2024, the point could only be awarded if the driver achieving the fastest lap finished the race in 10th position or better. The point has been discontinued for the 2025 season.

Fastest laps are often set during the final laps of a race. Lap times often decrease as tracks get "rubbered in" and fuel weights go down as a race progresses.

=== Top ten drivers in Formula One history with the most fastest laps ===
**Bold**	Driver has competed in the 2026 season

	Driver	Fastest laps
1	(Germany) Michael Schumacher	77
2	(United Kingdom) **Lewis Hamilton**	70
3	(Finland) Kimi Räikkönen	46
4	(France) Alain Prost	41
5	(Germany) Sebastian Vettel	38
5	(Netherlands) **Max Verstappen**	38
7	(United Kingdom) Nigel Mansell	30
8	(United Kingdom) Jim Clark	28
9	(Spain) **Fernando Alonso**	26
10	(Finland) Mika Häkkinen	25

=== Formula One performance hybrid racecar ===
In recent studies the LeMans endurance project has been reconfiguring Formula One racecars and making them faster by reconfiguring powertrain configurations. These powertrain reconfigurations have drastically been able to cut the time of the fastest lap achievable by Formula One racecars. This team also studied the capabilities of Formula One racecars and studied how to improve the performance of the cars. Ultimately they designed a powertrain configuration that cut the fastest lap time achievable by a standard Formula One racecar by over 20 seconds.

=== Formula One aerodynamics studies ===
A researcher at Durham University studied the aerodynamic effects on Formula One racecars and how to make them more efficient and ultimately faster. A Formula One racecar's lap time advantage is the result of the cornering performance of the vehicle. If the tyres can have more grip there would be more friction and less slippage which would allow the car to go faster through corners, and subsequently decrease the time it takes to complete a lap. Also if the powertrain had more power and if the car experienced less drag then it could achieve a faster lap time.

== NASCAR ==
In 2025, NASCAR began awarding the Xfinity Fastest Lap Award and a bonus point to whoever sets the fastest lap in a given race. All three national series (Cup, O'Reilly Auto Parts and Truck) are eligible for the award.

== Grand Prix motorcycle racing ==
In Grand Prix motorcycle racing, which includes the 50cc, 80cc, 125cc, 250cc, 350cc, 500cc, Moto3, Moto2, and MotoGP classes, Giacomo Agostini holds the record for the most fastest laps with 117, Valentino Rossi is second with 96 fastest laps, and Marc Márquez is third with 92 fastest laps.

=== Top ten riders in Grand Prix motorcycle racing with the most fastest laps ===
**Bold**	Rider still competing in Grand Prix motorcycle racing as of the 2026 season

	Rider	Fastest laps
1	(Italy) Giacomo Agostini	117
2	(Italy) Valentino Rossi	96
3	(Spain) **Marc Márquez**	92
4	(Spain) Ángel Nieto	81
5	(United Kingdom) Mike Hailwood	79
6	(Spain) Dani Pedrosa	64
7	(Australia) Mick Doohan	46
8	(Italy) Max Biaggi	42
9	(Spain) Jorge Lorenzo	37
10	(United Kingdom) Phil Read	36

== See also ==
- List of Indianapolis 500 fastest laps
