= 2018 ABC Supply 500 =

INDYCAR Motor Car Race

(United States) 2018 ABC Supply 500
Race details
14th round of the 2018 IndyCar Series season
← Previous race	Next race →
- Date: August 19, 2018
- Official name: ABC Supply 500
- Location: Pocono Raceway
- Course: Permanent racing facility 2.5 mi / 4.0 km
- Distance: 200 laps 500 mi / 800 km

Pole position
- Driver: (Australia) Will Power (Team Penske)
- Time: 40.9198 + 41.0808 = 1:22.0006

Fastest lap
- Driver: (France) Sébastien Bourdais (Dale Coyne Racing with Vasser-Sullivan)
- Time: 41.6072 (on lap 174 of 200)

Podium
- First: (United States) Alexander Rossi (Andretti Autosport)
- Second: (Australia) Will Power (Team Penske)
- Third: (New Zealand) Scott Dixon (Chip Ganassi Racing)

The 2018 ABC Supply 500 was the 14th round of the 2018 IndyCar Series season. The race was held on August 19 at Pocono Raceway in Long Pond, Pennsylvania. The race served as the 14th round of the 2018 IndyCar Series season. 2018 Indy 500 champion Will Power qualified on pole position, while 2016 Indy 500 champion Alexander Rossi took victory in the 200-lap race.

The race was marred by a massive crash on lap 6. It happened when Ryan Hunter-Reay and rookie Robert Wickens were racing side by side for 3rd place when the two made contact in turn 2. Hunter-Reay hit the wall and Wickens' car went over the top of Hunter-Reay's car and hit the catch fence tearing the car apart. The impact sent Wickens' car spinning like a top on the straight-away. The wreck also collected James Hinchcliffe, Takuma Sato, and Pietro Fittipaldi. Hunter-Reay, Hinchcliffe, Sato, and Fittipaldi were unharmed, but Wickens sustained severe injuries and was paralyzed from the chest down as a result. Wickens has since never returned to race in IndyCar but did return to racing in 2022, driving in the Michelin Pilot Challenge.

== Report ==
In 2018, IndyCar introduced new aero kits, which produced an Indianapolis 500 that was considered generally less-competitive than in previous years. With a record 42 lead changes at Pocono in 2017, drivers and teams entered the race expecting passing to be significantly harder.

On August 9, five drivers tested at Pocono. Rookies Robert Wickens, Pietro Fittipaldi, Zach Veach, Matheus Leist, and veteran Tony Kanaan completed several hours of laps at the track.

On the morning of Saturday, August 18, IndyCar officials confirmed that Pocono would return to the 2019 IndyCar schedule. The first, one-hour practice session for the race occurred at 11 a.m. on Saturday. Morning rain delayed the start by half an hour. As teams worked on their qualifying preparation, rookie Zach Veach posted the fastest speed with a lap of 217.393 mph. Josef Newgarden was second at 217.016 mph. Alexander Rossi was third fastest at 216.907 mph. Tony Kanaan posted the fastest speed single-car speed without a draft at 215.468 mph.

=== Time Trials ===
Qualifying was held at 1:30 p.m., giving teams just an hour and a half after practice to prepare. Will Power won the pole with a speed of 219.511 mph. It was the slowest pole speed since IndyCar's return to Pocono in 2013. Power's Team Penske teammate, Josef Newgarden, qualified second at 218.802 mph. Andretti Autosport teammates, Alexander Rossi and Ryan Hunter-Reay qualified third and fourth.

It was the 53rd time that Power had won the pole position for an IndyCar race, moving him into a tie for second all-time, tied with A.J. Foyt.

Power had won the Pocono 500 in 2016 and 2017. And by winning the 2018 Indianapolis 500, Power was looking to become the first driver since Al Unser in 1978 to win three consecutive 500 mile races if he could win at Pocono again in 2018.

An afternoon rain shower cancelled the afternoon practice session. IndyCar chose not to reschedule the final practice, meaning teams would have to start the race with no practice for their race setup.

=== Race ===
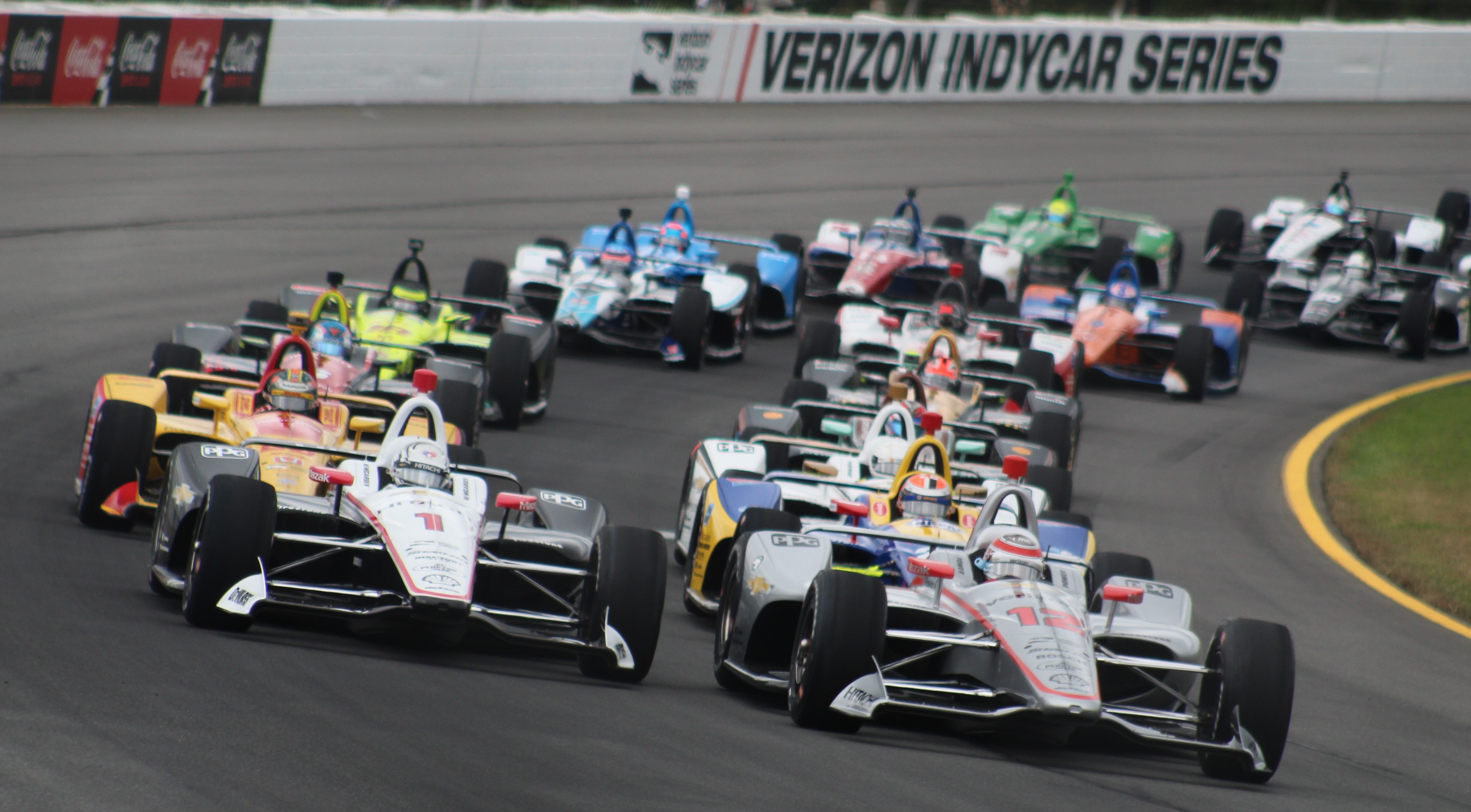
The start of the 2018 ABC Supply 500

As the field was approaching the green flag, the rows of cars were stacked too closely together and a crash occurred before the race began. Starting 18th, Graham Rahal accelerated and ran into the back of 16th place starter, Spencer Pigot. Pigot spun into the inside wall and suffered major damage to the rear of his car. He would only complete 17 laps before retiring from the race. Rahal suffered a broken front wing and slight damage to his suspension.

As a result of Pigot's crash, the first six laps were run at slow caution speeds. When the green flag was first shown on lap seven, Alexander Rossi passed Will Power entering turn one to take the lead. Robert Wickens passed Simon Pagenaud and Josef Newgarden on the outside in turn one to move into fourth place.

Carrying a lot of speed, Wickens moved to the inside of Hunter-Reay and attempted a pass entering turn two. Wickens' front wheel was alongside Hunter-Reay's rear wheel as they entered turn two. The cars made contact and spun Hunter-Reay at a 90 degree angle to race traffic. Wickens' front wheels climbed over the nose of Hunter-Reay's car and impacted the outside wall roughly three feet off the ground. The car continued to climb up the wall and impacted the catchfence with the nose of the car. The car caught a fence post and rotated several times, landing back on the racing surface and spinning seven times before coming to a stop against the inside wall. Takuma Sato, James Hinchcliffe, and Pietro Fittipaldi were involved in the crash as well.

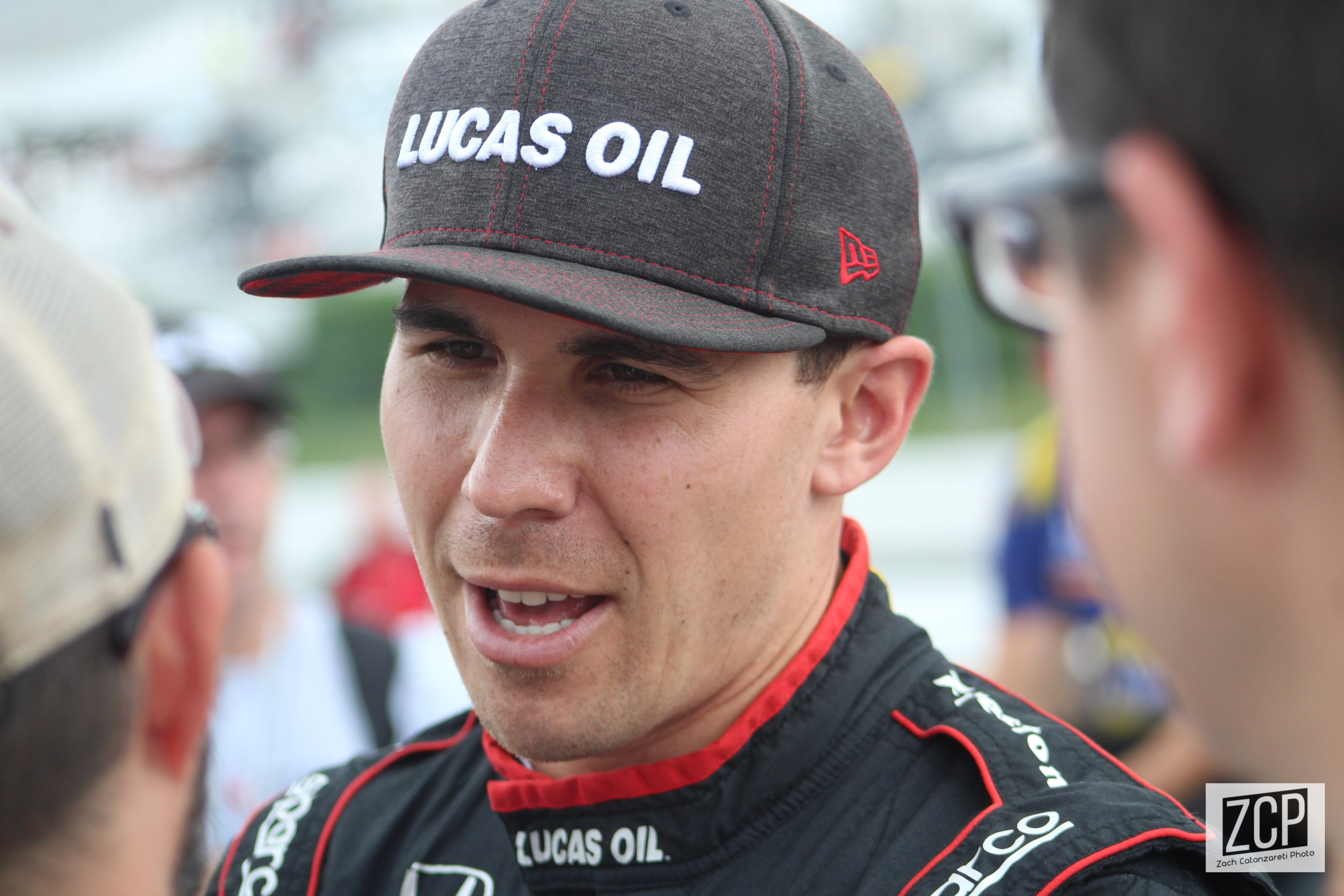
Robert Wickens on pit road before the 2018 ABC Supply 500

45 minutes after the accident, IndyCar VP of Communications, Curt Cavin, announced that Wickens was "awake and alert" and transported by helicopter to Lehigh Valley Hospital. Wickens list of injuries included "thoracic spinal fracture, spinal cord injury, neck fracture, tibia and fibula fractures to both legs, fractures in both hands, fractured right forearm, fractured elbow, four fractured ribs and a pulmonary contusion."

The race was stopped for 1 hour and 56 minutes. In the aftermath of the crash, the quality of the repair work on the fence was debated. Sébastien Bourdais said, "The construction guys said thumbs-up; I’m glad nobody tried it because I’m not sure that would have been satisfactory. It’s just tough moments. When we saw the extent of the damage I had a pretty good idea that it wasn’t gonna get fixed properly, and it wasn’t. The cables were loose, and it was just like, it was pretty lousy. So I wasn’t happy with it at all."

Bourdais' view was disputed by IndyCar president, Jay Frye, who said, "He was not at the scene. He was doing it from a visual perspective. A couple of angles you looked at it, it was different-looking, but another angle it looked fine. It's just how you looked at it."

When the race resumed, Alexander Rossi pulled away from the field. The only challenge to Rossi's domination came from Will Power. During green flag pit stops on lap 135, Power overtook Rossi. However, on lap 140, Rossi repassed Power for the lead going into turn two. Rossi led 180 laps, a new record for the Pocono 500.

Following the resumption of the race from the Wickens crash, the event was very clean with the final 189 laps run without cautions. Tony Kanaan dropped out after 16 laps with throttle issues. With 34 laps remaining, Conor Daly lightly hit the turn two wall with his right-side wheels. Daly entered pit road and the race continued without interruption.

Unlike the 42 lead changes in the 2017 Pocono 500, there were only 11 lead changes in 2018, the majority the result of green-flag pit stops.

== Broadcasting ==
The first practice session was streamed live on IndyCar's YouTube channel with audio from the Indianapolis Motor Speedway Radio Network. Qualifying was broadcast live on NBCSN.

The race was aired by NBCSN. The booth announcers were Leigh Diffey, Paul Tracy, and Townsend Bell. Pit reporters were Kevin Lee, Jon Beekhuis, and Katie Hargitt, and Robin Miller.

In the United States, the race had a 0.34 TV rating and 542,000 viewers. It was the third most watched IndyCar race on NBCSN in 2018, behind only races with NASCAR as lead-in programming: a tape-delayed broadcast of Mid-Ohio, and the season-final at Sonoma.

== Results ==
Key	Meaning
R	Rookie
W	Past winner

=== Qualifying ===
Pos	No.	Name	Lap 1 Time	Lap 2 Time	Total Time	Avg. Speed (mph)
1	12	(Australia) Will Power W	40.9198	41.0808	1:22.0006	219.511
2	1	(United States) Josef Newgarden	41.1722	41.0941	1:22.2663	218.802
3	27	(United States) Alexander Rossi	41.2094	41.0733	1:22.2827	218.758
4	28	(United States) Ryan Hunter-Reay W	41.3504	41.2918	1:22.6422	217.806
5	22	(France) Simon Pagenaud	41.2416	41.4148	1:22.6564	217.769
6	6	(Canada) Robert Wickens R	41.3551	41.3609	1:22.7160	217.612
7	26	(United States) Zach Veach R	41.3640	41.3617	1:22.7257	217.587
8	18	(France) Sébastien Bourdais	41.4366	41.3997	1:22.8363	217.296
9	5	(Canada) James Hinchcliffe	41.4384	41.5076	1:22.9460	217.009
10	30	(Japan) Takuma Sato	41.4024	41.5993	1:23.0017	216.863
11	98	(United States) Marco Andretti	41.5262	41.5542	1:23.0804	216.658
12	10	(United Arab Emirates) Ed Jones	41.6197	41.5030	1:23.1227	216.547
13	9	(New Zealand) Scott Dixon W	41.5182	41.6572	1:23.1754	216.410
14	14	(Brazil) Tony Kanaan	41.5753	41.6318	1:23.2071	216.328
15	20	(United States) Ed Carpenter	41.7411	41.5825	1:23.3236	216.025
16	21	(United States) Spencer Pigot	41.8965	41.7556	1:23.6521	215.177
17	19	(Brazil) Pietro Fittipaldi R	41.9230	42.0574	1:23.9804	214.336
18	15	(United States) Graham Rahal	41.9882	42.0358	1:24.0240	214.225
19	23	(United States) Charlie Kimball	42.6072	42.3310	1:24.9382	211.919
20	4	(Brazil) Matheus Leist R	42.5070	42.5207	1:25.0277	211.696
21	59	(United Kingdom) Max Chilton	42.8636	43.0146	1:25.8782	209.599
22	88	(United States) Conor Daly	42.7467	43.3978	1:26.1445	208.951
OFFICIAL BOX SCORE

=== Race ===
Pos	No.	Driver	Team	Engine	Laps	Time/Retired	Pit Stops	Grid	Laps Led	Pts.^{1}
1	27	(United States) Alexander Rossi	Andretti Autosport	Honda	200	2:36:49.1128	6	3	180	53
2	12	(Australia) Will Power W	Team Penske	Chevrolet	200	+4.4982	6	1	16	42
3	9	(New Zealand) Scott Dixon W	Chip Ganassi Racing	Honda	200	+41.3557	7	13	3	36
4	18	(France) Sébastien Bourdais	Dale Coyne Racing with Vasser-Sullivan	Honda	200	+42.0120	6	8		32
5	1	(United States) Josef Newgarden	Team Penske	Chevrolet	199	+1 lap	6	2		30
6	26	(United States) Zach Veach R	Andretti Autosport	Honda	199	+1 lap	6	7		28
7	98	(United States) Marco Andretti	Andretti Herta Autosport with Curb-Agajanian	Honda	199	+1 lap	6	11		26
8	22	(France) Simon Pagenaud	Team Penske	Chevrolet	199	+1 lap	7	5		24
9	23	(United States) Charlie Kimball	Carlin	Chevrolet	199	+1 lap	7	19		22
10	20	(United States) Ed Carpenter	Ed Carpenter Racing	Chevrolet	198	+2 laps	7	15	1	21
11	4	(Brazil) Matheus Leist R	A. J. Foyt Enterprises	Chevrolet	197	+3 laps	7	20		19
12	10	(United Arab Emirates) Ed Jones	Chip Ganassi Racing	Honda	197	+3 laps	7	12		18
13	59	(United Kingdom) Max Chilton	Carlin	Chevrolet	196	+4 laps	7	21		17
14	15	(United States) Graham Rahal	Rahal Letterman Lanigan Racing	Honda	196	+4 laps	8	18		16
15	88	(United States) Conor Daly	Harding Racing	Chevrolet	162	Contact	7	22		15
16	21	(United States) Spencer Pigot	Ed Carpenter Racing	Chevrolet	17	Contact	0	16		14
17	14	(Brazil) Tony Kanaan	A. J. Foyt Enterprises	Chevrolet	16	Mechanical	1	14		13
18	28	(United States) Ryan Hunter-Reay W	Andretti Autosport	Honda	6	Contact	0	4		12
19	6	(Canada) Robert Wickens R	Schmidt Peterson Motorsports	Honda	6	Contact	0	6		11
20	5	(Canada) James Hinchcliffe	Schmidt Peterson Motorsports	Honda	6	Contact	0	9		10
21	30	(Japan) Takuma Sato	Rahal Letterman Lanigan Racing	Honda	6	Contact	0	10		9
22	19	(Brazil) Pietro Fittipaldi R	Dale Coyne Racing	Honda	6	Contact	0	17		8
OFFICIAL BOX SCORE

Notes: ^{1} Points include 1 point for leading at least 1 lap during a race, an additional 2 points for leading the most race laps, and 1 point for Pole Position.

== Championship standings after the race ==
Drivers' Championship standings

Pos	Driver	Points
1	(New Zealand) Scott Dixon	530
2	(United States) Alexander Rossi	501
3	(United States) Josef Newgarden	464
4	(Australia) Will Power	449
5	(United States) Ryan Hunter-Reay	411

Manufacturer standings

Pos	Manufacturer	Points
1	(Japan) Honda	1,199
2	(United States) Chevrolet	988

- Note: Only the top five positions are included.

Previous race: 2018 Honda Indy 200	IndyCar Series; 2018 season	Next race: 2018 Bommarito Automotive Group 500
Previous race: 2017 ABC Supply 500	ABC Supply 500	Next race: 2019 ABC Supply 500
