= 2018 Desert Diamond West Valley Phoenix Grand Prix =

(United States) 2018 Phoenix
Race details
2nd round of the 2018 IndyCar Series season
← Previous race	Next race →
- Phoenix International Raceway (2011-2018)
- Date: April 7, 2018
- Official name: Desert Diamond West Valley Phoenix Grand Prix
- Location: Phoenix International Raceway
- Course: Permanent racing facility 1.022 mi / 1.645 km
- Distance: 250 laps 255.5 mi / 411.25 km

Pole position
- Driver: (France) Sébastien Bourdais (Dale Coyne Racing with Vasser-Sullivan)
- Time: 19.5034 + 19.5251 = 39.0285

Fastest lap
- Driver: (France) Sébastien Bourdais (Dale Coyne Racing with Vasser-Sullivan)
- Time: 20.6270 (on lap 2 of 250)

Podium
- First: (United States) Josef Newgarden (Team Penske)
- Second: (Canada) Robert Wickens (Schmidt Peterson Motorsports)
- Third: (United States) Alexander Rossi (Andretti Autosport)

The 2018 Desert Diamond West Valley Phoenix Grand Prix was the second round of the 2018 IndyCar Series season and the first oval race of the season. It took place on April 7, 2018 at Phoenix International Raceway in Avondale, Arizona. The race was won by Josef Newgarden for Team Penske, his eighth career win and third on an oval.

== Results ==
Key	Meaning
R	Rookie
W	Past winner

=== Qualifying ===
Pos	No.	Name	Lap 1 Time	Lap 2 Time	Total Time	Avg. Speed (mph)
1	18	(France) Sébastien Bourdais	19.5034	19.5251	39.0285	188.539
2	22	(France) Simon Pagenaud W	19.5728	19.5368	39.1096	188.148
3	12	(Australia) Will Power	19.7129	19.6679	39.3808	186.852
4	27	(United States) Alexander Rossi	19.6845	19.7024	39.3869	186.824
5	5	(Canada) James Hinchcliffe	19.7807	19.8358	39.6165	185.741
6	6	(Canada) Robert Wickens R	19.9323	19.7652	39.6975	185.362
7	1	(United States) Josef Newgarden	19.9128	19.8024	39.7152	185.279
8	28	(United States) Ryan Hunter-Reay	19.9739	19.8645	39.8384	184.706
9	14	(Brazil) Tony Kanaan W	20.0181	19.8443	39.8624	184.595
10	19	(Brazil) Pietro Fittipaldi R	19.9545	19.9180	39.8725	184.548
11	10	(United Arab Emirates) Ed Jones	19.9185	20.0049	39.9234	184.313
12	15	(United States) Graham Rahal	20.0189	19.9899	40.0088	183.920
13	30	(Japan) Takuma Sato	20.1675	20.0512	40.2187	182.960
14	32	(United States) Kyle Kaiser R	20.1490	20.0919	40.2409	182.859
15	21	(United States) Spencer Pigot	20.1656	20.2619	40.4275	182.015
16	4	(Brazil) Matheus Leist R	20.3264	20.1451	40.4715	181.817
17	9	(New Zealand) Scott Dixon W	20.3380	20.1364	40.4744	181.804
18	20	(United States) Ed Carpenter	20.3036	20.2959	40.5995	181.244
19	88	(Colombia) Gabby Chaves	20.4359	20.2336	40.6695	180.932
20	98	(United States) Marco Andretti	20.3702	20.4647	40.8349	180.199
21	59	(United Kingdom) Max Chilton	20.6604	20.5720	41.2324	178.462
22	23	(United States) Charlie Kimball	20.8841	20.5720	41.4561	177.499
23	26	(United States) Zach Veach R	20.6702	21.2023	41.8725	175.733
OFFICIAL BOX SCORE

=== Race ===
Pos	No.	Driver	Team	Engine	Laps	Time/Retired	Pit Stops	Grid	Laps Led	Pts.^{1}
1	1	(United States) Josef Newgarden	Team Penske	Chevrolet	250	1:44:00.3552	4	7	30	51
2	6	(Canada) Robert Wickens R	Schmidt Peterson Motorsports	Honda	250	+2.9946	3	6	44	41
3	27	(United States) Alexander Rossi	Andretti Autosport	Honda	250	+3.4890	4	4	1	36
4	9	(New Zealand) Scott Dixon W	Chip Ganassi Racing	Honda	250	+3.8175	4	17		32
5	28	(United States) Ryan Hunter-Reay	Andretti Autosport	Honda	250	+4.0122	4	8	5	31
6	5	(Canada) James Hinchcliffe	Schmidt Peterson Motorsports	Honda	250	+9.4497	3	5	20	29
7	20	(United States) Ed Carpenter	Ed Carpenter Racing	Chevrolet	250	+9.4731	4	18		26
8	14	(Brazil) Tony Kanaan W	A. J. Foyt Enterprises	Chevrolet	250	+9.8650	4	9		24
9	15	(United States) Graham Rahal	Rahal Letterman Lanigan Racing	Honda	250	+10.1747	4	12	7	23
10	22	(France) Simon Pagenaud W	Team Penske	Chevrolet	250	+10.3247	4	2	3	21
11	30	(Japan) Takuma Sato	Rahal Letterman Lanigan Racing	Honda	250	+10.9443	4	13		19
12	98	(United States) Marco Andretti	Andretti Herta Autosport with Curb-Agajanian	Honda	249	+1 Lap	5	20		18
13	18	(France) Sébastien Bourdais	Dale Coyne Racing with Vasser-Sullivan	Honda	249	+1 Lap	5	1	60	19
14	21	(United States) Spencer Pigot	Ed Carpenter Racing	Chevrolet	249	+1 Lap	5	15		16
15	88	(Colombia) Gabby Chaves	Harding Racing	Chevrolet	249	+1 Lap	4	19		15
16	26	(United States) Zach Veach R	Andretti Autosport	Honda	249	+1 Lap	4	23		14
17	23	(United States) Charlie Kimball	Carlin	Chevrolet	248	+2 Laps	5	22		13
18	59	(United Kingdom) Max Chilton	Carlin	Chevrolet	247	+3 Laps	5	21		12
19	4	(Brazil) Matheus Leist R	A. J. Foyt Enterprises	Chevrolet	241	+9 Laps	6	16		11
20	10	(United Arab Emirates) Ed Jones	Chip Ganassi Racing	Honda	228	Contact	3	11		10
21	32	(United States) Kyle Kaiser R	Juncos Racing	Chevrolet	174	Contact	2	14		9
22	12	(Australia) Will Power	Team Penske	Chevrolet	153	Contact	2	3	80	11
23	19	(Brazil) Pietro Fittipaldi R	Dale Coyne Racing	Honda	40	Contact	0	10		7
OFFICIAL BOX SCORE

Notes: ^{1} Points include 1 point for leading at least 1 lap during a race, an additional 2 points for leading the most race laps, and 1 point for Pole Position.

== Championship standings after the race ==
Drivers' Championship standings

	Pos	Driver	Points
6	1	(United States) Josef Newgarden	77
1	2	(United States) Alexander Rossi	72
2	3	(France) Sébastien Bourdais	70
2	4	(United States) Graham Rahal	63
1	5	(Canada) James Hinchcliffe	61

Manufacturer standings

Pos	Manufacturer	Points
1	(Japan) Honda	172
2	(United States) Chevrolet	127

- Note: Only the top five positions are included.

Previous race: 2018 Firestone Grand Prix of St. Petersburg	IndyCar Series; 2018 season	Next race: 2018 Toyota Grand Prix of Long Beach
Previous race: 2017 Desert Diamond West Valley Phoenix Grand Prix	Desert Diamond West Valley Phoenix Grand Prix	Next race: None
