= 2018 IndyCar Grand Prix =

(United States) 2018 IndyCar Grand Prix
Race details
5th round of the 2018 IndyCar Series season
← Previous race	Next race →
- Date: May 12, 2018
- Official name: IndyCar Grand Prix
- Location: Indianapolis Motor Speedway
- Course: Permanent racing facility 2.439 mi / 3.925 km
- Distance: 85 laps 207.315 mi / 333.64 km

Pole position
- Driver: (Australia) Will Power (Team Penske)
- Time: 1:09.8182

Fastest lap
- Driver: (New Zealand) Scott Dixon (Chip Ganassi Racing)
- Time: 1:10.5687 (on lap 15 of 85)

Podium
- First: (Australia) Will Power (Team Penske)
- Second: (New Zealand) Scott Dixon (Chip Ganassi Racing)
- Third: (Canada) Robert Wickens (Schmidt Peterson Motorsports)

The 2018 IndyCar Grand Prix, officially known as the 2018 IndyCar Grand Prix presented by Sea-Doo for sponsorship reasons, was the fifth round of the 2018 IndyCar Series season. The race took place over 85 laps on the infield road course at Indianapolis Motor Speedway in Speedway, Indiana. Will Power, driving for Team Penske, won the race.

This was the first IndyCar Indianapolis Motor Speedway Road Corse race to not feature a DNF.

== Results ==
Icon	Meaning
R	Rookie
W	Past winner

=== Qualifying ===
Pos	No.	Name	Grp.	Round 1	Round 2	Firestone Fast 6
1	12	(Australia) Will Power W	2	1:09.8557	1:09.9156	1:09.8182
2	6	(Canada) Robert Wickens R	1	1:09.5215	1:09.8481	1:09.9052
3	18	(France) Sébastien Bourdais	2	1:09.5510	1:09.9973	1:09.9449
4	5	(Canada) James Hinchcliffe	1	1:09.8244	1:09.9570	1:10.0858
5	20	(United Kingdom) Jordan King R	1	1:09.8735	1:09.8879	1:10.1326
6	1	(United States) Josef Newgarden	1	1:10.0768	1:10.0067	1:10.7276
7	22	(France) Simon Pagenaud W	2	1:09.8982	1:10.0382	
8	27	(United States) Alexander Rossi	2	1:10.0596	1:10.1062	
9	21	(United States) Spencer Pigot	1	1:09.8657	1:10.1601	
10	3	(Brazil) Hélio Castroneves	1	1:10.0825	1:10.1847	
11	30	(Japan) Takuma Sato	2	1:10.0492	1:10.1979	
12	14	(Brazil) Tony Kanaan	2	1:10.0379	1:10.3592	
13	28	(United States) Ryan Hunter-Reay	1	1:10.0985		
14	98	(United States) Marco Andretti	2	1:10.1044		
15	10	(United Arab Emirates) Ed Jones	1	1:10.2859		
16	59	(United Kingdom) Max Chilton	2	1:10.2113		
17	15	(United States) Graham Rahal	1	1:10.3605		
18	9	(New Zealand) Scott Dixon	2	1:10.3221		
19	19	(Canada) Zachary Claman DeMelo R	1	1:10.5064		
20	26	(United States) Zach Veach R	2	1:10.3371		
21	4	(Brazil) Matheus Leist R	1	1:10.6425		
22	88	(Colombia) Gabby Chaves	2	1:10.5066		
23	23	(United States) Charlie Kimball	1	1:10.7784		
24	32	(United States) Kyle Kaiser R	2	1:10.7394		
OFFICIAL BOX SCORE

Source for individual rounds:

=== Race ===
Pos	No.	Driver	Team	Engine	Laps	Time/Retired	Pit Stops	Grid	Laps Led	Pts.^{1}
1	12	(Australia) Will Power W	Team Penske	Chevrolet	85	1:49:46.1935	3	1	56	54
2	9	(New Zealand) Scott Dixon	Chip Ganassi Racing	Honda	85	+2.2443	3	18		40
3	6	(Canada) Robert Wickens R	Schmidt Peterson Motorsports	Honda	85	+8.1621	3	2	20	36
4	18	(France) Sébastien Bourdais	Dale Coyne Racing with Vasser-Sullivan	Honda	85	+8.7293	3	3	1	33
5	27	(United States) Alexander Rossi	Andretti Autosport	Honda	85	+11.7462	3	8	2	31
6	3	(Brazil) Hélio Castroneves	Team Penske	Chevrolet	85	+14.3860	3	10		28
7	5	(Canada) James Hinchcliffe	Schmidt Peterson Motorsports	Honda	85	+15.3368	3	4		26
8	22	(France) Simon Pagenaud W	Team Penske	Chevrolet	85	+17.2354	4	7		24
9	15	(United States) Graham Rahal	Rahal Letterman Lanigan Racing	Honda	85	+18.0987	3	17	3	23
10	30	(Japan) Takuma Sato	Rahal Letterman Lanigan Racing	Honda	85	+23.1137	4	11		20
11	1	(United States) Josef Newgarden	Team Penske	Chevrolet	85	+24.2632	3	6	1	19
12	19	(Canada) Zachary Claman DeMelo R	Dale Coyne Racing	Honda	85	+30.0421	3	19		18
13	98	(United States) Marco Andretti	Andretti Herta Autosport with Curb-Agajanian	Honda	85	+37.4374	3	14		17
14	14	(Brazil) Tony Kanaan	A. J. Foyt Enterprises	Chevrolet	85	+41.3456	4	12		16
15	21	(United States) Spencer Pigot	Ed Carpenter Racing	Chevrolet	85	+41.6927	6	9		15
16	59	(United Kingdom) Max Chilton	Carlin	Chevrolet	85	+42.8434	3	16		14
17	88	(Colombia) Gabby Chaves	Harding Racing	Chevrolet	85	+45.0983	5	22		13
18	28	(United States) Ryan Hunter-Reay	Andretti Autosport	Honda	85	+53.1086	3	13		12
19	32	(United States) Kyle Kaiser R	Juncos Racing	Chevrolet	85	+58.1755	4	24	2	12
20	23	(United States) Charlie Kimball	Carlin	Chevrolet	85	+1:11.7538	4	23		10
21	4	(Brazil) Matheus Leist R	A. J. Foyt Enterprises	Chevrolet	85	+1:17.9918	4	21		9
22	10	(United Arab Emirates) Ed Jones	Chip Ganassi Racing	Honda	84	+1 Lap	4	15		8
23	26	(United States) Zach Veach R	Andretti Autosport	Honda	84	+1 Lap	5	20		7
24	20	(United Kingdom) Jordan King R	Ed Carpenter Racing	Chevrolet	83	+2 Laps	4	5		6
OFFICIAL BOX SCORE

Notes: ^{1} Points include 1 point for leading at least 1 lap during a race, an additional 2 points for leading the most race laps, and 1 point for Pole Position.

== Championship standings after the race ==
Drivers' Championship standings

	Pos	Driver	Points
	1	(United States) Josef Newgarden	178
	2	(United States) Alexander Rossi	176
	3	(France) Sébastien Bourdais	152
3	4	(New Zealand) Scott Dixon	147
	5	(Canada) James Hinchcliffe	144

Manufacturer standings

Pos	Manufacturer	Points
1	(Japan) Honda	414
2	(United States) Chevrolet	354

- Note: Only the top five positions are included.

Previous race: 2018 Honda Indy Grand Prix of Alabama	IndyCar Series; 2018 season	Next race: 2018 Indianapolis 500
Previous race: 2017 IndyCar Grand Prix	Grand Prix of Indianapolis	Next race: 2019 IndyCar Grand Prix
