= 2018 Kohler Grand Prix =

(United States) 2018 Road America
Race details
10th round of the 2018 IndyCar Series season
← Previous race	Next race →
- Date: June 24, 2018
- Official name: Kohler Grand Prix
- Location: Road America
- Course: Permanent racing facility 4.048 mi / 6.458 km
- Distance: 55 laps 222.64 mi / 358.304 km

Pole position
- Driver: (United States) Josef Newgarden (Team Penske)
- Time: 1:43.2026

Fastest lap
- Driver: (United States) Zach Veach (Andretti Autosport)
- Time: 1:45.2421 (on lap 46 of 55)

Podium
- First: (United States) Josef Newgarden (Team Penske)
- Second: (United States) Ryan Hunter-Reay (Andretti Autosport)
- Third: (New Zealand) Scott Dixon (Chip Ganassi Racing)

The 2018 Kohler Grand Prix was an IndyCar Series event held at Road America in Elkhart Lake, Wisconsin. The race served as the 10th round of the 2018 IndyCar Series season. Reigning champion Josef Newgarden qualified on pole position, and took victory in the 55 lap race.

== Results ==
Key	Meaning
R	Rookie
W	Past winner

=== Qualifying ===
Pos	No.	Name	Grp.	Round 1	Round 2	Firestone Fast 6
1	1	(United States) Josef Newgarden	2	1:43.0010	1:42.9296	1:43.2026
2	12	(Australia) Will Power W	1	1:43.4455	1:43.0745	1:43.2508
3	28	(United States) Ryan Hunter-Reay	1	1:43.0943	1:42.9860	1:43.3811
4	27	(United States) Alexander Rossi	1	1:43.0740	1:42.7998	1:43.4361
5	6	(Canada) Robert Wickens R	2	1:42.9097	1:43.0737	1:43.7121
6	18	(France) Sébastien Bourdais	1	1:43.6921	1:43.0505	1:43.7332
7	30	(Japan) Takuma Sato	2	1:43.3077	1:43.1108	
8	9	(New Zealand) Scott Dixon W	2	1:43.0993	1:43.1769	
9	15	(United States) Graham Rahal	2	1:43.2588	1:43.1874	
10	21	(United States) Spencer Pigot	2	1:43.4150	1:43.1995	
11	26	(United States) Zach Veach R	1	1:43.4578	1:43.2265	
12	10	(United Arab Emirates) Ed Jones	1	1:43.6753	1:43.3544	
13	20	(United Kingdom) Jordan King R	1	1:43.7356		
14	22	(France) Simon Pagenaud	2	1:43.4153		
15	98	(United States) Marco Andretti	1	1:43.9843		
16	5	(Canada) James Hinchcliffe	2	1:43.8591		
17	19	(Canada) Zachary Claman DeMelo R	1	1:44.0189		
18	14	(Brazil) Tony Kanaan	2	1:44.1165		
19	23	(United States) Charlie Kimball	1	1:45.1161		
20	4	(Brazil) Matheus Leist R	2	1:44.3438		
21	32	(Mexico) Alfonso Celis Jr. R	1	1:45.5584		
22	59	(United Kingdom) Max Chilton	2	1:44.3442		
23	88	(Colombia) Gabby Chaves	2	1:44.6258		
OFFICIAL BOX SCORE

=== Race ===
Pos	No.	Driver	Team	Engine	Laps	Time/Retired	Pit Stops	Grid	Laps Led	Pts.^{1}
1	1	(United States) Josef Newgarden	Team Penske	Chevrolet	55	1:40:16.4165	3	1	53	54
2	28	(United States) Ryan Hunter-Reay	Andretti Autosport	Honda	55	+3.3759	3	3		40
3	9	(New Zealand) Scott Dixon W	Chip Ganassi Racing	Honda	55	+5.4902	3	8	2	36
4	30	(Japan) Takuma Sato	Rahal Letterman Lanigan Racing	Honda	55	+14.8772	3	7		32
5	6	(Canada) Robert Wickens R	Schmidt Peterson Motorsports	Honda	55	+23.8993	3	5		30
6	15	(United States) Graham Rahal	Rahal Letterman Lanigan Racing	Honda	55	+32.5513	3	9		28
7	22	(France) Simon Pagenaud	Team Penske	Chevrolet	55	+42.1868	3	14		26
8	21	(United States) Spencer Pigot	Ed Carpenter Racing	Chevrolet	55	+42.5336	3	10		24
9	10	(United Arab Emirates) Ed Jones	Chip Ganassi Racing	Honda	55	+46.2118	3	12		22
10	5	(Canada) James Hinchcliffe	Schmidt Peterson Motorsports	Honda	55	+47.5359	3	16		20
11	98	(United States) Marco Andretti	Andretti Herta Autosport with Curb-Agajanian	Honda	55	+48.1468	3	15		19
12	20	(United Kingdom) Jordan King R	Ed Carpenter Racing	Chevrolet	55	+53.4242	3	13		18
13	18	(France) Sébastien Bourdais	Dale Coyne Racing with Vasser-Sullivan	Honda	55	+1:00.3249	3	6		17
14	14	(Brazil) Tony Kanaan	A. J. Foyt Enterprises	Chevrolet	55	+1:05.2583	4	18		16
15	4	(Brazil) Matheus Leist R	A. J. Foyt Enterprises	Chevrolet	55	+1:09.7681	3	20		15
16	27	(United States) Alexander Rossi	Andretti Autosport	Honda	55	+1:23.4715	3	4		14
17	59	(United Kingdom) Max Chilton	Carlin	Chevrolet	55	+1:24.3709	3	22		13
18	23	(United States) Charlie Kimball	Carlin	Chevrolet	55	+1:43.1557	4	19		12
19	88	(Colombia) Gabby Chaves	Harding Racing	Chevrolet	54	+1 Lap	5	23		11
20	32	(Mexico) Alfonso Celis Jr. R	Juncos Racing	Chevrolet	54	+1 Lap	3	21		10
21	19	(Canada) Zachary Claman DeMelo R	Dale Coyne Racing	Honda	54	+1 Lap	4	17		9
22	26	(United States) Zach Veach R	Andretti Autosport	Honda	54	+1 Lap	5	11		8
23	12	(Australia) Will Power W	Team Penske	Chevrolet	2	Mechanical	1	2		7
OFFICIAL BOX SCORE

Notes: ^{1} Points include 1 point for leading at least 1 lap during a race, an additional 2 points for leading the most race laps, and 1 point for Pole Position.

== Championship standings after the race ==
Drivers' Championship standings

	Pos	Driver	Points
	1	(New Zealand) Scott Dixon	393
2	2	(United States) Ryan Hunter-Reay	348
1	3	(United States) Alexander Rossi	348
1	4	(United States) Josef Newgarden	343
2	5	(Australia) Will Power	328

Manufacturer standings

Pos	Manufacturer	Points
1	(Japan) Honda	833
2	(United States) Chevrolet	706

- Note: Only the top five positions are included.

Previous race: 2018 DXC Technology 600	IndyCar Series; 2018 season	Next race: 2018 Iowa Corn 300
Previous race: 2017 Kohler Grand Prix	Kohler Grand Prix	Next race: 2019 REV Group Grand Prix at Road America
