= 2018 Iowa Corn 300 =

(United States) 2018 Iowa Corn 300
Race details
11th round of the 2018 IndyCar Series season
← Previous race	Next race →
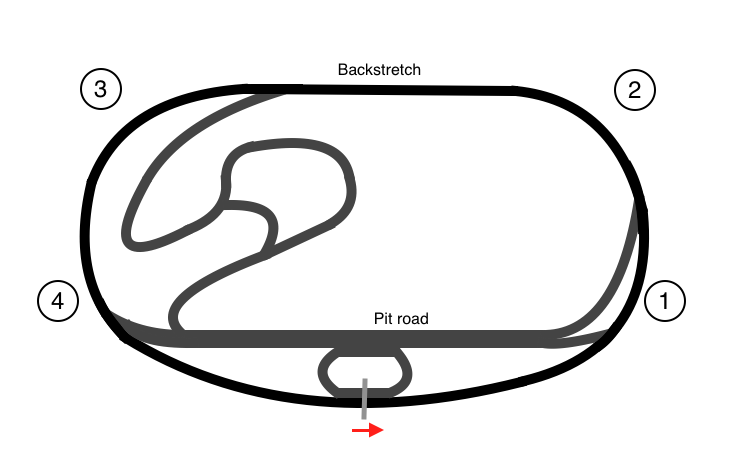
- Date: July 9, 2018
- Official name: Iowa Corn 300
- Location: Iowa Speedway
- Course: Permanent racing facility 0.875 mi / 1.400 km
- Distance: 300 laps 268.2 mi / 431.63 km

Pole position
- Driver: (Australia) Will Power (Team Penske)
- Time: 17.6801 + 17.6112 = 35.2913

Fastest lap
- Driver: (Australia) Will Power (Team Penske)
- Time: 18.6422 (on lap 2 of 300)

Podium
- First: (Canada) James Hinchcliffe (Schmidt Peterson Motorsports)
- Second: (United States) Spencer Pigot (Ed Carpenter Racing)
- Third: (Japan) Takuma Sato (Rahal Letterman Lanigan Racing)

The 2018 Iowa Corn 300 was an IndyCar Series event held at Iowa Speedway in Newton, Iowa on July 8, 2018. The event served as the 11th round of the 2018 IndyCar Series season. Will Power took his 52nd pole while James Hinchcliffe claimed victory of the 300-lap race, which ended under caution.

== Results ==
Key	Meaning
R	Rookie
W	Past winner

=== Qualifying ===
Pos	No.	Name	Lap 1 Time	Lap 2 Time	Total Time	Avg. Speed (mph)
1	12	(Australia) Will Power	17.6801	17.6112	35.2913	182.391
2	1	(United States) Josef Newgarden W	17.7252	17.8058	35.5310	181.160
3	28	(United States) Ryan Hunter-Reay W	17.8034	17.8219	35.6253	180.681
4	22	(France) Simon Pagenaud	17.8616	17.8364	35.6980	180.313
5	27	(United States) Alexander Rossi	17.9188	17.8808	35.7996	179.801
6	9	(New Zealand) Scott Dixon	17.9873	17.8672	35.8545	179.526
7	6	(Canada) Robert Wickens R	17.9760	18.0073	35.9833	178.883
8	10	(United Arab Emirates) Ed Jones	18.0150	18.0011	36.0161	178.720
9	20	(United States) Ed Carpenter	18.0985	17.9183	36.0168	178.717
10	30	(Japan) Takuma Sato	18.0678	17.9507	36.0185	178.708
11	5	(Canada) James Hinchcliffe W	18.0289	18.0361	36.0650	178.478
12	15	(United States) Graham Rahal	18.0323	18.0463	36.0786	178.410
13	14	(Brazil) Tony Kanaan W	18.0341	18.1260	36.1601	178.008
14	26	(United States) Zach Veach R	18.0867	18.1139	36.2006	177.809
15	18	(France) Sébastien Bourdais	18.0438	18.1830	36.2268	177.681
16	88	(Colombia) Gabby Chaves	18.1637	18.3125	36.4762	176.466
17	23	(United States) Charlie Kimball	18.1934	18.3284	36.5218	176.245
18	21	(United States) Spencer Pigot	18.2349	18.5027	36.7376	175.210
19	98	(United States) Marco Andretti W	18.2374	18.6396	36.8770	174.548
20	19	(Canada) Zachary Claman DeMelo R	18.4002	18.5209	36.9211	174.339
21	59	(United Kingdom) Max Chilton	18.6021	18.5086	37.1107	173.449
22	4	(Brazil) Matheus Leist R	19.0284	19.1214	38.1498	168.724
OFFICIAL BOX SCORE

=== Race ===
Pos	No.	Driver	Team	Engine	Laps	Time/Retired	Pit Stops	Grid	Laps Led	Pts.^{1}
1	5	(Canada) James Hinchcliffe W	Schmidt Peterson Motorsports	Honda	300	1:47:32.4666	3	11	45	51
2	21	(United States) Spencer Pigot	Ed Carpenter Racing	Chevrolet	300	+2.6491	3	18		40
3	30	(Japan) Takuma Sato	Rahal Letterman Lanigan Racing	Honda	300	+3.2506	3	10	3	36
4	1	(United States) Josef Newgarden W	Team Penske	Chevrolet	300	+4.5296	4	2	229	35
5	6	(Canada) Robert Wickens R	Schmidt Peterson Motorsports	Honda	300	+6.3214	4	7		30
6	12	(Australia) Will Power	Team Penske	Chevrolet	299	+1 lap	3	1	23	30
7	15	(United States) Graham Rahal	Rahal Letterman Lanigan Racing	Honda	299	+1 lap	4	12		26
8	22	(France) Simon Pagenaud	Team Penske	Chevrolet	299	+1 lap	4	4		24
9	27	(United States) Alexander Rossi	Andretti Autosport	Honda	298	+2 laps	4	5		22
10	20	(United States) Ed Carpenter	Ed Carpenter Racing	Chevrolet	298	+2 laps	4	9		20
11	18	(France) Sébastien Bourdais	Dale Coyne Racing with Vasser-Sullivan	Honda	297	+3 laps	3	15		19
12	9	(New Zealand) Scott Dixon	Chip Ganassi Racing	Honda	296	+4 laps	4	6		18
13	10	(United Arab Emirates) Ed Jones	Chip Ganassi Racing	Honda	295	+5 laps	5	8		17
14	23	(United States) Charlie Kimball	Carlin	Chevrolet	295	+5 laps	3	17		16
15	59	(United Kingdom) Max Chilton	Carlin	Chevrolet	294	+6 laps	5	21		15
16	98	(United States) Marco Andretti W	Andretti Herta Autosport with Curb-Agajanian	Honda	293	+7 laps	4	19		14
17	14	(Brazil) Tony Kanaan W	A. J. Foyt Enterprises	Chevrolet	292	+8 laps	4	13		13
18	19	(Canada) Zachary Claman DeMelo R	Dale Coyne Racing	Honda	291	+9 laps	6	20		12
19	28	(United States) Ryan Hunter-Reay W	Andretti Autosport	Honda	283	Mechanical	6	3		11
20	26	(United States) Zach Veach R	Andretti Autosport	Honda	279	+21 laps	5	14		10
21	88	(Colombia) Gabby Chaves	Harding Racing	Chevrolet	99	Handling	1	16		9
22	4	(Brazil) Matheus Leist R	A. J. Foyt Enterprises	Chevrolet	40	Mechanical	0	22		8
OFFICIAL BOX SCORE

Notes: ^{1} Points include 1 point for leading at least 1 lap during a race, an additional 2 points for leading the most race laps, and 1 point for Pole Position.

== Championship standings after the race ==
Drivers' Championship standings

	Pos	Driver	Points
	1	(New Zealand) Scott Dixon	411
2	2	(United States) Josef Newgarden	378
1	3	(United States) Alexander Rossi	370
2	4	(United States) Ryan Hunter-Reay	359
	5	(Australia) Will Power	358

Manufacturer standings

Pos	Manufacturer	Points
1	(Japan) Honda	923
2	(United States) Chevrolet	779

- Note: Only the top five positions are included.

Previous race: 2018 Kohler Grand Prix	IndyCar Series; 2018 season	Next race: 2018 Honda Indy Toronto
Previous race: 2017 Iowa Corn 300	Iowa Corn 300	Next race: 2019 Iowa 300
