= 2018 Grand Prix of Portland =

(United States) 2018 Portland
Race details
16th round of the 2018 IndyCar Series season
← Previous race	Next race →
- Portland International Raceway Track Layout
- Date: September 2, 2018
- Official name: Grand Prix of Portland
- Location: Portland International Raceway
- Course: Permanent Road Course; 1.964 mi / 3.142 km
- Distance: 105 laps 206.220 mi / 329.952 km

Pole position
- Driver: (Australia) Will Power (Team Penske)
- Time: 57.3467

Fastest lap
- Driver: (Colombia) Carlos Muñoz (Schmidt Peterson Motorsports)
- Time: 58.7403 (on lap 19 of 105)

Podium
- First: (Japan) Takuma Sato (Rahal Letterman Lanigan Racing)
- Second: (United States) Ryan Hunter-Reay (Andretti Autosport)
- Third: (France) Sébastien Bourdais (Dale Coyne Racing with Vasser-Sullivan)

The 2018 Grand Prix of Portland was the 16th And penultimate round of the 2018 IndyCar Series season. The race was held on September 2 at Portland International Raceway, in Portland, Oregon. 2018 Indy 500 champion Will Power qualified on pole position, while 2017 Indy 500 champion Takuma Sato took victory in the 105-lap race.

== Results ==
Key	Meaning
R	Rookie
W	Past winner

=== Qualifying ===
Pos	No.	Name	Grp.	Round 1	Round 2	Firestone Fast 6
1	12	(Australia) Will Power	2	57.2143	57.3556	57.3467
2	1	(United States) Josef Newgarden	2	57.5911	57.6519	57.6877
3	27	(United States) Alexander Rossi	1	57.5718	57.4291	57.7361
4	18	(France) Sébastien Bourdais W	2	57.5534	57.4632	57.8881
5	28	(United States) Ryan Hunter-Reay	2	57.5851	57.4696	57.9699
6	26	(United States) Zach Veach R	1	57.6874	57.5371	58.1057
7	5	(Canada) James Hinchcliffe	2	57.5980	57.6429	
8	10	(United Arab Emirates) Ed Jones	1	57.5698	57.6499	
9	98	(United States) Marco Andretti	1	57.7480	57.7277	
10	15	(United States) Graham Rahal	1	57.7349	57.7772	
11	9	(New Zealand) Scott Dixon	2	57.5496	57.8554	
12	20	(United Kingdom) Jordan King R	1	57.6326	57.9010	
13	60	(United Kingdom) Jack Harvey R	1	57.9620		
14	6	(Colombia) Carlos Muñoz	2	57.6748		
15	59	(United Kingdom) Max Chilton	1	57.9865		
16	19	(Brazil) Pietro Fittipaldi R	2	57.7321		
17	21	(United States) Spencer Pigot	1	57.9939		
18	39	(United States) Santino Ferrucci R	2	57.7735		
19	4	(Brazil) Matheus Leist R	1	58.0036		
20	30	(Japan) Takuma Sato	2	57.7848		
21	88	(Colombia) Gabby Chaves	1	58.1635		
22	22	(France) Simon Pagenaud	2	58.0983		
23	32	(Mexico) Alfonso Celis Jr. R	1	58.2735		
24	14	(Brazil) Tony Kanaan	2	58.2531		
25	23	(United States) Charlie Kimball	2	58.3219		
OFFICIAL BOX SCORE

=== Race ===
Pos	No.	Driver	Team	Engine	Laps	Time/Retired	Pit Stops	Grid	Laps Led	Pts.^{1}
1	30	(Japan) Takuma Sato	Rahal Letterman Lanigan Racing	Honda	105	2:00:09.7537	3	20	25	51
2	28	(United States) Ryan Hunter-Reay	Andretti Autosport	Honda	105	+0.6084	2	5	19	41
3	18	(France) Sébastien Bourdais W	Dale Coyne Racing with Vasser-Sullivan	Honda	105	+1.8266	4	4		35
4	21	(United States) Spencer Pigot	Ed Carpenter Racing	Chevrolet	105	+4.5557	3	17		32
5	9	(New Zealand) Scott Dixon	Chip Ganassi Racing	Honda	105	+5.3215	4	11		30
6	22	(France) Simon Pagenaud	Team Penske	Chevrolet	105	+11.4605	4	22		28
7	23	(United States) Charlie Kimball	Carlin	Chevrolet	105	+12.0057	3	25		26
8	27	(United States) Alexander Rossi	Andretti Autosport	Honda	105	+13.3769	3	3	32	27
9	19	(Brazil) Pietro Fittipaldi R	Dale Coyne Racing	Honda	105	+18.3753	3	16		22
10	1	(United States) Josef Newgarden	Team Penske	Chevrolet	105	+19.8044	3	2	8	21
11	14	(Brazil) Tony Kanaan	A. J. Foyt Enterprises	Chevrolet	105	+22.1362	3	24		19
12	6	(Colombia) Carlos Muñoz	Schmidt Peterson Motorsports	Honda	105	+22.7069	3	14		18
13	88	(Colombia) Gabby Chaves	Harding Racing	Chevrolet	105	+23.7138	3	21		17
14	4	(Brazil) Matheus Leist R	A. J. Foyt Enterprises	Chevrolet	105	+29.7958	3	19		16
15	20	(United Kingdom) Jordan King R	Ed Carpenter Racing	Chevrolet	105	+32.1352	3	12		15
16	60	(United Kingdom) Jack Harvey R	Michael Shank Racing with Schmidt Peterson	Honda	105	+32.4191	3	13		14
17	32	(Mexico) Alfonso Celis Jr. R	Juncos Racing	Chevrolet	105	+48.8038	4	23		13
18	59	(United Kingdom) Max Chilton	Carlin	Chevrolet	105	+55.2123	3	15	10	13
19	26	(United States) Zach Veach R	Andretti Autosport	Honda	104	+1 lap	3	6		11
20	39	(United States) Santino Ferrucci R	Dale Coyne Racing	Honda	101	+4 laps	3	18		10
21	12	(Australia) Will Power	Team Penske	Chevrolet	98	+7 laps	4	1	11	11
22	5	(Canada) James Hinchcliffe	Schmidt Peterson Motorsports	Honda	76	+29 laps	5	7		8
23	15	(United States) Graham Rahal	Rahal Letterman Lanigan Racing	Honda	4	Contact	2	10		7
24	10	(United Arab Emirates) Ed Jones	Chip Ganassi Racing	Honda	0	Contact	0	8		6
25	98	(United States) Marco Andretti	Andretti Herta Autosport with Curb-Agajanian	Honda	0	Contact	0	9		5
OFFICIAL BOX SCORE

Notes: ^{1} Points include 1 point for leading at least 1 lap during a race, an additional 2 points for leading the most race laps, and 1 point for Pole Position.

== Championship standings after the race ==
Drivers' Championship standings

Pos	Driver	Points
1	(New Zealand) Scott Dixon	598
2	(United States) Alexander Rossi	569
3	(Australia) Will Power	511
4	(United States) Josef Newgarden	511
5	(United States) Ryan Hunter-Reay	462

Manufacturer standings

Pos	Manufacturer	Points
1	(Japan) Honda	1,371
2	(United States) Chevrolet	1,136

- Note: Only the top five positions are included.

Previous race: 2018 Bommarito Automotive Group 500	IndyCar Series; 2018 season	Next race: 2018 GoPro Grand Prix of Sonoma
Previous race: 2007 Grand Prix of Portland; Champ Car World Series event	Grand Prix of Portland	Next race: 2019 Grand Prix of Portland
