= 2018 Honda Indy Toronto =

(Canada) 2018 Toronto
Race details
12th round of the 2018 IndyCar Series season
← Previous race	Next race →
- Date: July 15, 2018
- Official name: Honda Indy Toronto
- Location: Exhibition Place
- Course: Temporary road course 1.786 mi / 2.874 km
- Distance: 85 laps 151.81 mi / 244.314 km
- Weather: Hot with temperatures reaching up to 28 °C (82 °F); wind speeds reaching up to 14.8 kilometres per hour (9.2 mph)

Pole position
- Driver: (United States) Josef Newgarden (Team Penske)
- Time: 59.4956

Fastest lap
- Driver: (Australia) Will Power (Team Penske)
- Time: 59.7140 (on lap 76 of 85)

Podium
- First: (New Zealand) Scott Dixon (Chip Ganassi Racing)
- Second: (France) Simon Pagenaud (Team Penske)
- Third: (Canada) Robert Wickens (Schmidt Peterson Motorsports)

The 2018 Honda Indy Toronto was an IndyCar Series event held on July 15, 2018 in Toronto, Ontario, Canada. The race served as the 12th round of the 2018 IndyCar Series season. Reigning champion Josef Newgarden qualified on pole position, while current leader Scott Dixon took victory in the 85-lap race.

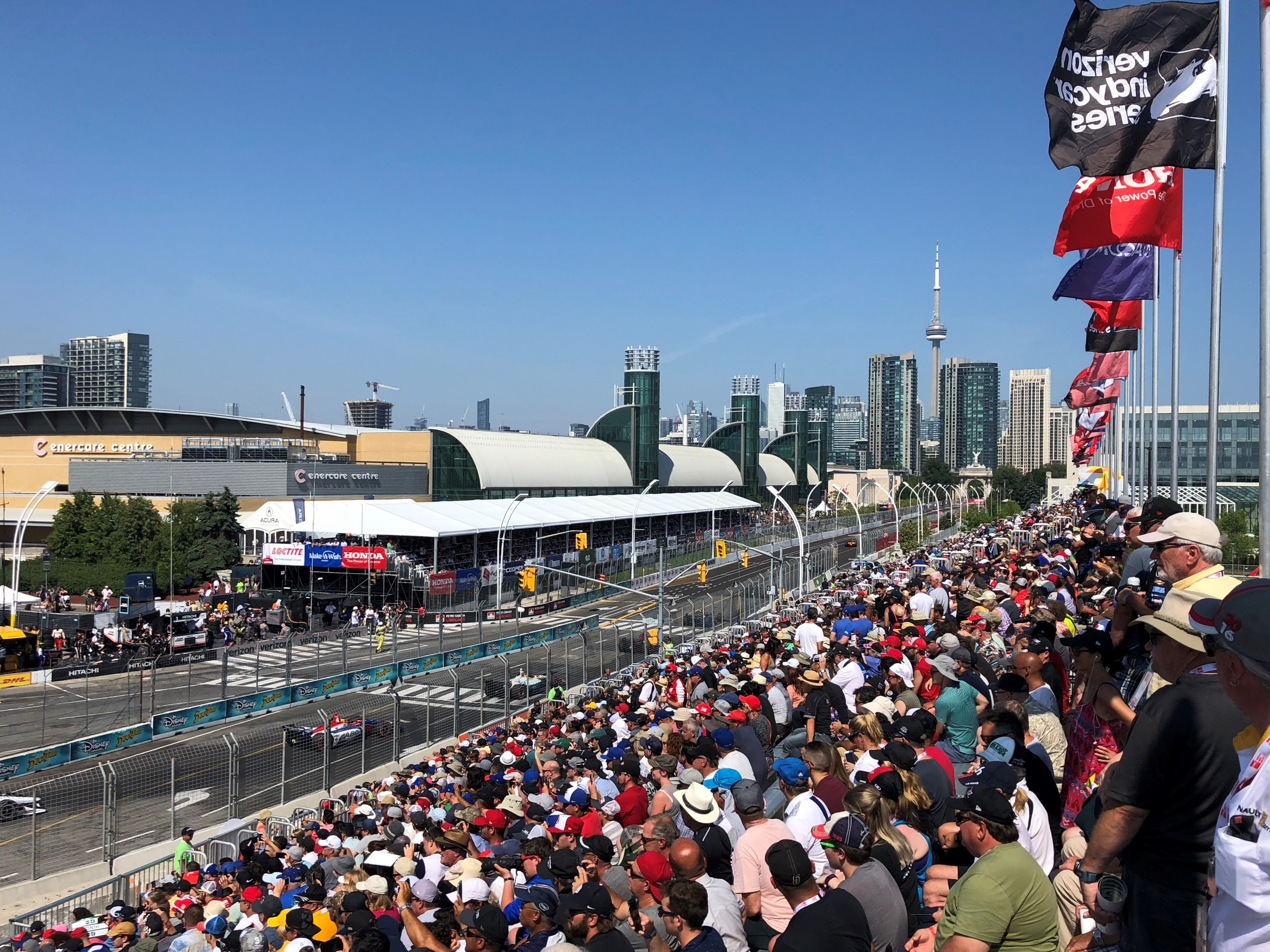
2018 Honda Indy Toronto at Exhibition Place

== Results ==
Key	Meaning
R	Rookie
W	Past winner

=== Qualifying ===
Pos	No.	Name	Grp.	Round 1	Round 2	Firestone Fast 6
1	1	(United States) Josef Newgarden W	1	1:14.4764	58.7733	59.4956
2	9	(New Zealand) Scott Dixon W	1	1:12.7806	58.5546	59.6920
3	22	(France) Simon Pagenaud	2	59.6056	58.6008	59.7630
4	12	(Australia) Will Power	2	59.4840	58.9073	59.8818
5	27	(United States) Alexander Rossi	1	1:13.3045	58.8411	1:00.6273
6	28	(United States) Ryan Hunter-Reay W	2	59.6027	58.5807	1:00.6615
7	30	(Japan) Takuma Sato	2	59.7443	59.0712	
8	20	(United Kingdom) Jordan King R	1	1:14.2201	59.0862	
9	5	(Canada) James Hinchcliffe	1	1:14.5169	59.1581	
10	6	(Canada) Robert Wickens R	2	59.9357	59.1705	
11	88	(United States) Conor Daly	1	1:14.3595	59.3133	
12	4	(Brazil) Matheus Leist R	2	1:00.0484	59.4528	
13	15	(United States) Graham Rahal	1	1:14.7769		
14	98	(United States) Marco Andretti	2	1:00.1721		
15	14	(Brazil) Tony Kanaan	1	1:14.9691		
16	21	(United States) Spencer Pigot	2	1:00.1838		
17	18	(France) Sébastien Bourdais	1	1:15.1429		
18	59	(United Kingdom) Max Chilton	2	1:00.2694		
19	32	(Austria) René Binder R	1	1:15.8928		
20	23	(United States) Charlie Kimball	2	1:00.4313		
21	10	(United Arab Emirates) Ed Jones	1	No time		
22	26	(United States) Zach Veach R	2	1:00.5564		
23	19	(Canada) Zachary Claman DeMelo R	2	1:00.6416		
OFFICIAL BOX SCORE

=== Race ===
Pos	No.	Driver	Team	Engine	Laps	Time/Retired	Pit Stops	Grid	Laps Led	Pts.^{1}
1	9	(New Zealand) Scott Dixon W	Chip Ganassi Racing	Honda	85	1:37:00.3100	2	2	49	53
2	22	(France) Simon Pagenaud	Team Penske	Chevrolet	85	+5.2701	2	3	1	41
3	6	(Canada) Robert Wickens R	Schmidt Peterson Motorsports	Honda	85	+6.7753	2	10		35
4	5	(Canada) James Hinchcliffe	Schmidt Peterson Motorsports	Honda	85	+18.3362	2	9		32
5	23	(United States) Charlie Kimball	Carlin	Chevrolet	85	+18.8439	2	20	1	31
6	14	(Brazil) Tony Kanaan	A. J. Foyt Enterprises	Chevrolet	85	+30.4354	2	15	1	29
7	26	(United States) Zach Veach R	Andretti Autosport	Honda	85	+32.2732	2	22		26
8	27	(United States) Alexander Rossi	Andretti Autosport	Honda	85	+34.5257	6	5		24
9	1	(United States) Josef Newgarden W	Team Penske	Chevrolet	85	+35.5755	3	1	25	24
10	98	(United States) Marco Andretti	Andretti Herta Autosport with Curb-Agajanian	Honda	85	+38.9089	3	14		20
11	20	(United Kingdom) Jordan King R	Ed Carpenter Racing	Chevrolet	85	+39.3331	2	8	6	20
12	10	(United Arab Emirates) Ed Jones	Chip Ganassi Racing	Honda	85	+42.3674	4	21		18
13	88	(United States) Conor Daly	Harding Racing	Chevrolet	85	+46.5785	2	11		17
14	19	(Canada) Zachary Claman DeMelo R	Dale Coyne Racing	Honda	85	+54.4973	2	23		16
15	4	(Brazil) Matheus Leist R	A. J. Foyt Enterprises	Chevrolet	85	+59.0749	5	12		15
16	28	(United States) Ryan Hunter-Reay W	Andretti Autosport	Honda	84	+1 lap	5	6		14
17	32	(Austria) René Binder R	Juncos Racing	Chevrolet	83	+2 laps	3	19		13
18	12	(Australia) Will Power	Team Penske	Chevrolet	83	+2 laps	4	4	1	13
19	18	(France) Sébastien Bourdais	Dale Coyne Racing with Vasser-Sullivan	Honda	83	+2 laps	5	17		11
20	21	(United States) Spencer Pigot	Ed Carpenter Racing	Chevrolet	76	Contact	2	16	1	11
21	15	(United States) Graham Rahal	Rahal Letterman Lanigan Racing	Honda	68	+17 laps	4	13		9
22	30	(Japan) Takuma Sato	Rahal Letterman Lanigan Racing	Honda	66	Contact	2	7		8
23	59	(United Kingdom) Max Chilton	Carlin	Chevrolet	34	Contact	1	18		7
OFFICIAL BOX SCORE

Notes: ^{1} Points include 1 point for leading at least 1 lap during a race, an additional 2 points for leading the most race laps, and 1 point for Pole Position.

== Championship standings after the race ==
Drivers' Championship standings

Pos	Driver	Points
1	(New Zealand) Scott Dixon	464
2	(United States) Josef Newgarden	402
3	(United States) Alexander Rossi	394
4	(United States) Ryan Hunter-Reay	373
5	(Australia) Will Power	371

Manufacturer standings

Pos	Manufacturer	Points
1	(Japan) Honda	1,013
2	(United States) Chevrolet	850

- Note: Only the top five positions are included.

Previous race: 2018 Iowa Corn 300	IndyCar Series; 2018 season	Next race: 2018 Honda Indy 200
Previous race: 2017 Honda Indy Toronto	Honda Indy Toronto	Next race: 2019 Honda Indy Toronto
