= 2018 Honda Indy 200 =

(United States) 2018 Mid-Ohio
Race details
13th round of the 2018 IndyCar Series season
← Previous race	Next race →
- Date: July 29, 2018
- Official name: Honda Indy 200
- Location: Mid-Ohio Sports Car Course
- Course: Permanent racing facility 2.258 mi / 3.634 km
- Distance: 90 laps 203.2 mi / 327.02 km

Pole position
- Driver: (United States) Alexander Rossi (Andretti Autosport)
- Time: 1:04.6802

Fastest lap
- Driver: (New Zealand) Scott Dixon (Chip Ganassi Racing)
- Time: 1:06.7269 (on lap 44 of 90)

Podium
- First: (United States) Alexander Rossi (Andretti Autosport)
- Second: (Canada) Robert Wickens (Schmidt Peterson Motorsports)
- Third: (Australia) Will Power (Team Penske)

The 2018 Honda Indy 200 was an IndyCar Series event held on July 29, 2018, at the Mid-Ohio Sports Car Course in Lexington, Ohio. The race served as the 13th round of the 2018 IndyCar Series season. 2016 Indy 500 champion Alexander Rossi qualified on pole position, and took victory in the 90-lap race. This race featured no DNFs.

== Results ==
Icon	Meaning
R	Rookie
W	Past winner

=== Qualifying ===
Pos	No.	Name	Grp.	Round 1	Round 2	Firestone Fast 6
1	27	(United States) Alexander Rossi	1	1:04.9219	1:05.8750	1:04.6802
2	12	(Australia) Will Power	2	1:04.9930	1:05.1891	1:04.8939
3	28	(United States) Ryan Hunter-Reay	1	1:05.3285	1:05.1573	1:04.9896
4	1	(United States) Josef Newgarden W	1	1:05.5510	1:06.0341	1:05.1335
5	6	(Canada) Robert Wickens R	1	1:05.3842	1:06.0450	1:05.1747
6	59	(United Kingdom) Max Chilton	1	1:05.6344	1:05.9931	1:06.6172
7	15	(United States) Graham Rahal W	2	1:05.3844	1:06.1084	
8	30	(Japan) Takuma Sato	2	1:05.3250	1:06.3755	
9	9	(New Zealand) Scott Dixon W	2	1:05.4750	1:06.4187	
10	5	(Canada) James Hinchcliffe	2	1:05.1649	1:06.5549	
11	10	(United Arab Emirates) Ed Jones	2	1:05.3408	1:07.0999	
12	26	(United States) Zach Veach R	1	1:05.3434	1:07.2287	
13	98	(United States) Marco Andretti	1	1:05.6353		
14	88	(United States) Conor Daly	2	1:05.7260		
15	23	(United States) Charlie Kimball W	1	1:05.9471		
16	20	(United Kingdom) Jordan King R	2	1:05.7699		
17	22	(France) Simon Pagenaud W	1	1:05.9630		
18	21	(United States) Spencer Pigot	2	1:05.8133		
19	14	(Brazil) Tony Kanaan	1	1:06.0520		
20	60	(United Kingdom) Jack Harvey R	2	1:05.9911		
21	4	(Brazil) Matheus Leist R	1	1:06.7354		
22	19	(Brazil) Pietro Fittipaldi R	2	1:06.2138		
23	32	(Austria) René Binder R	1	1:06.9555		
24	18	(France) Sébastien Bourdais	2	No time		
OFFICIAL BOX SCORE

Source for individual rounds:

=== Race ===
Pos	Grid	No.	Driver	Team	Engine	Laps	Time/Retired	Pit Stops	Laps Led	Pts.^{1}
1	1	27	(United States) Alexander Rossi	Andretti Autosport	Honda	90	1:44:15.2137	2	66	54
2	5	6	(Canada) Robert Wickens R	Schmidt Peterson Motorsports	Honda	90	+12.8285	3	15	41
3	2	12	(Australia) Will Power	Team Penske	Chevrolet	90	+14.7086	3	9	36
4	4	1	(United States) Josef Newgarden W	Team Penske	Chevrolet	90	+18.0065	3		32
5	9	9	(New Zealand) Scott Dixon W	Chip Ganassi Racing	Honda	90	+18.9382	3		30
6	24	18	(France) Sébastien Bourdais	Dale Coyne Racing with Vasser-Sullivan	Honda	90	+19.5312	3		28
7	3	28	(United States) Ryan Hunter-Reay	Andretti Autosport	Honda	90	+21.4614	3		26
8	17	22	(France) Simon Pagenaud W	Team Penske	Chevrolet	90	+21.8246	3		24
9	7	15	(United States) Graham Rahal W	Rahal Letterman Lanigan Racing	Honda	90	+23.1494	3		22
10	12	26	(United States) Zach Veach R	Andretti Autosport	Honda	90	+24.3930	3		20
11	13	98	(United States) Marco Andretti	Andretti Herta Autosport with Curb-Agajanian	Honda	90	+36.5906	3		19
12	16	20	(United Kingdom) Jordan King R	Ed Carpenter Racing	Chevrolet	90	+41.4002	3		18
13	18	21	(United States) Spencer Pigot	Ed Carpenter Racing	Chevrolet	90	+43.3340	3		17
14	10	5	(Canada) James Hinchcliffe	Schmidt Peterson Motorsports	Honda	90	+1:04.0882	3		16
15	11	10	(United Arab Emirates) Ed Jones	Chip Ganassi Racing	Honda	90	+1:07.1156	4		15
16	15	23	(United States) Charlie Kimball W	Carlin	Chevrolet	89	+1 lap	3		14
17	8	30	(Japan) Takuma Sato	Rahal Letterman Lanigan Racing	Honda	89	+1 lap	3		13
18	19	14	(Brazil) Tony Kanaan	A. J. Foyt Enterprises	Chevrolet	89	+1 lap	3		12
19	21	4	(Brazil) Matheus Leist R	A. J. Foyt Enterprises	Chevrolet	89	+1 lap	3		11
20	20	60	(United Kingdom) Jack Harvey R	Meyer Shank Racing with Schmidt Peterson	Honda	89	+1 lap	3		10
21	23	32	(Austria) René Binder R	Juncos Racing	Chevrolet	89	+1 lap	3		9
22	14	88	(United States) Conor Daly	Harding Racing	Chevrolet	88	+2 laps	3		8
23	22	19	(Brazil) Pietro Fittipaldi R	Dale Coyne Racing	Honda	88	+2 laps	3		7
24	6	59	(United Kingdom) Max Chilton	Carlin	Chevrolet	88	+2 laps	4		6
OFFICIAL BOX SCORE

Notes: ^{1} Points include 1 point for leading at least 1 lap during a race, an additional 2 points for leading the most race laps, and 1 point for Pole Position.

== Championship standings after the race ==
Drivers' Championship standings

	Pos	Driver	Points
	1	(New Zealand) Scott Dixon	494
1	2	(United States) Alexander Rossi	448
1	3	(United States) Josef Newgarden	434
1	4	(Australia) Will Power	407
1	5	(United States) Ryan Hunter-Reay	399

Manufacturer standings

Pos	Manufacturer	Points
1	(Japan) Honda	1,109
2	(United States) Chevrolet	917

- Note: Only the top five positions are included.

Previous race: 2018 Honda Indy Toronto	IndyCar Series; 2018 season	Next race: 2018 ABC Supply 500
Previous race: 2017 Honda Indy 200	Honda Indy 200	Next race: 2019 Honda Indy 200
