= 2018 Bommarito Automotive Group 500 =

(United States) 2018 Gateway
Race details
15th round of the 2018 IndyCar Series season
← Previous race	Next race →
- Date: August 25, 2018
- Official name: Bommarito Automotive Group 500 Presented by Valvoline
- Location: Gateway Motorsports Park
- Course: Permanent racing facility 1.25 mi / 2.01 km
- Distance: 248 laps 310 mi / 499 km

Pole position
- Driver: (New Zealand) Scott Dixon (Chip Ganassi Racing)

Fastest lap
- Driver: (Australia) Will Power (Team Penske)
- Time: 25.1165 (on lap 218 of 248)

Podium
- First: (Australia) Will Power (Team Penske)
- Second: (United States) Alexander Rossi (Andretti Autosport)
- Third: (New Zealand) Scott Dixon (Chip Ganassi Racing)

The 2018 Bommarito Automotive Group 500 Presented by Valvoline was the 15th round of the 2018 IndyCar Series season. The race was held on August 26 at Gateway Motorsports Park in Madison, Illinois, just east of St. Louis, Missouri. 2017 Indy 500 pole winner Scott Dixon qualified on pole position after qualifying was canceled due to rain, while 2018 Indy 500 champion Will Power took victory in the 248-lap race.

== Results ==
Key	Meaning
R	Rookie
W	Past winner

=== Qualifying ===
Qualifying was canceled due to rain, so the race grid is based on entrant point standings.

Pos	No.	Name	Points
1	9	(New Zealand) Scott Dixon	530
2	27	(United States) Alexander Rossi	501
3	1	(United States) Josef Newgarden W	464
4	12	(Australia) Will Power	449
5	28	(United States) Ryan Hunter-Reay	411
6	22	(France) Simon Pagenaud	368
7	15	(United States) Graham Rahal	351
8	5	(Canada) James Hinchcliffe	338
9	18	(France) Sébastien Bourdais	325
10	98	(United States) Marco Andretti	311
11	20	(United States) Ed Carpenter	295
12	10	(United Arab Emirates) Ed Jones	273
13	30	(Japan) Takuma Sato	267
14	21	(United States) Spencer Pigot	253
15	14	(Brazil) Tony Kanaan	240
16	26	(United States) Zach Veach R	239
17	23	(United States) Charlie Kimball	234
18	4	(Brazil) Matheus Leist R	201
19	88	(Colombia) Gabby Chaves	198
20	59	(United Kingdom) Max Chilton	179
21	19	(Brazil) Pietro Fittipaldi R	162
OFFICIAL BOX SCORE

=== Race ===
Pos	Grid	No.	Driver	Team	Engine	Laps	Time/Retired	Pit Stops	Laps Led	Pts.^{1}
1	4	12	(Australia) Will Power	Team Penske	Chevrolet	248	1:59:30.1972	4	93	51
2	2	27	(United States) Alexander Rossi	Andretti Autosport	Honda	248	+1.3117	3	4	41
3	1	9	(New Zealand) Scott Dixon	Chip Ganassi Racing	Honda	248	+2.8092	4	145	38
4	6	22	(France) Simon Pagenaud	Team Penske	Chevrolet	248	+3.1336	4		32
5	16	26	(United States) Zach Veach R	Andretti Autosport	Honda	248	+7.2693	4	2	31
6	14	21	(United States) Spencer Pigot	Ed Carpenter Racing	Chevrolet	248	+10.5509	4		28
7	3	1	(United States) Josef Newgarden W	Team Penske	Chevrolet	248	+10.6003	4		26
8	12	10	(United Arab Emirates) Ed Jones	Chip Ganassi Racing	Honda	248	+22.1362	4		24
9	13	30	(Japan) Takuma Sato	Rahal Letterman Lanigan Racing	Honda	247	+1 lap	3	4	23
10	7	15	(United States) Graham Rahal	Rahal Letterman Lanigan Racing	Honda	247	+1 lap	3		20
11	21	19	(Brazil) Pietro Fittipaldi R	Dale Coyne Racing	Honda	247	+1 lap	4		19
12	11	20	(United States) Ed Carpenter	Ed Carpenter Racing	Chevrolet	247	+1 lap	4		18
13	10	98	(United States) Marco Andretti	Andretti Herta Autosport with Curb-Agajanian	Honda	246	+2 laps	4		17
14	18	4	(Brazil) Matheus Leist R	A. J. Foyt Enterprises	Chevrolet	246	+2 laps	4		16
15	15	14	(Brazil) Tony Kanaan	A. J. Foyt Enterprises	Chevrolet	246	+2 laps	4		15
16	8	5	(Canada) James Hinchcliffe	Schmidt Peterson Motorsports	Honda	246	+2 laps	5		14
17	20	59	(United Kingdom) Max Chilton	Carlin	Chevrolet	244	+4 laps	5		13
18	19	88	(Colombia) Gabby Chaves	Harding Racing	Chevrolet	242	+6 laps	6		12
19	17	23	(United States) Charlie Kimball	Carlin	Chevrolet	235	+13 laps	6		11
20	5	28	(United States) Ryan Hunter-Reay	Andretti Autosport	Honda	172	Mechanical	2		10
21	9	18	(France) Sébastien Bourdais	Dale Coyne Racing with Vasser-Sullivan	Honda	0	Contact	0		9
OFFICIAL BOX SCORE

Notes

^{1} Points include 1 point for leading at least 1 lap during a race, an additional 2 points for leading the most race laps, and 1 point for Pole Position.

== Championship standings after the race ==
Drivers' Championship standings

	Pos	Driver	Points
	1	(New Zealand) Scott Dixon	568
	2	(United States) Alexander Rossi	542
1	3	(Australia) Will Power	500
1	4	(United States) Josef Newgarden	490
	5	(United States) Ryan Hunter-Reay	421

Manufacturer standings

Pos	Manufacturer	Points
1	(Japan) Honda	1,276
2	(United States) Chevrolet	1,075

- Note: Only the top five positions are included.

Previous race: 2018 ABC Supply 500	IndyCar Series; 2018 season	Next race: 2018 Grand Prix of Portland
Previous race: 2017 Bommarito Automotive Group 500	Bommarito Automotive Group 500	Next race: 2019 Bommarito Automotive Group 500
