= 2018 DXC Technology 600 =

(United States) 2018 DXC Technology 600
Race details
9th round of the 2018 IndyCar Series season
← Previous race	Next race →
- Date: June 9, 2018
- Official name: DXC Technology 600
- Location: Texas Motor Speedway
- Course: Permanent racing facility 1.455 mi / 2.342 km
- Distance: 248 laps 360.8 mi / 580.8 km

Pole position
- Driver: (United States) Josef Newgarden (Team Penske)
- Time: 23.5162 + 23.4802 = 46.9964

Fastest lap
- Driver: (United States) Josef Newgarden (Team Penske)
- Time: 23.4197 (on lap 235 of 248)

Podium
- First: (New Zealand) Scott Dixon (Chip Ganassi Racing)
- Second: (France) Simon Pagenaud (Team Penske)
- Third: (United States) Alexander Rossi (Andretti Autosport)

The 2018 DXC Technology 600 was the ninth round of the 2018 IndyCar Series season, contested over 248 laps at the 1.5-mile (2.4 km) Texas Motor Speedway in Fort Worth, Texas. Josef Newgarden claimed his fourth pole and lead Team Penske 1-2-3, while Scott Dixon claimed his 43rd career win and took the championship lead.

== Results ==
Key	Meaning
R	Rookie
W	Past winner

=== Qualifying ===
Pos	No.	Name	Lap 1 Time	Lap 2 Time	Total Time	Avg. Speed (mph)
1	1	(United States) Josef Newgarden	23.5162	23.4802	46.9964	220.613
2	22	(France) Simon Pagenaud	23.5424	23.5183	47.0607	220.311
3	12	(Australia) Will Power W	23.5732	23.5125	47.0857	220.194
4	6	(Canada) Robert Wickens R	23.6260	23.5954	47.2214	219.561
5	18	(France) Sébastien Bourdais	23.6295	23.6477	47.2772	219.302
6	14	(Brazil) Tony Kanaan W	23.6406	23.6678	47.3085	219.157
7	9	(New Zealand) Scott Dixon W	23.6429	23.6753	47.3182	219.112
8	27	(United States) Alexander Rossi	23.7303	23.6351	47.3654	218.894
9	30	(Japan) Takuma Sato	23.7034	23.7305	47.4339	218.578
10	28	(United States) Ryan Hunter-Reay	23.7586	23.6808	47.4394	218.553
11	98	(United States) Marco Andretti	23.7325	23.7334	47.4659	218.430
12	23	(United States) Charlie Kimball	23.7520	23.7761	47.5281	218.145
13	10	(United Arab Emirates) Ed Jones	23.7648	23.7687	47.5335	218.120
14	20	(United States) Ed Carpenter W	23.8047	23.7424	47.5471	218.057
15	5	(Canada) James Hinchcliffe	23.8539	23.7953	47.6492	217.590
16	26	(United States) Zach Veach R	23.8880	23.7869	47.6749	218.430
17	88	(Colombia) Gabby Chaves	23.8903	23.8557	47.7460	217.149
18	21	(United States) Spencer Pigot	23.9098	23.8922	47.8020	216.895
19	4	(Brazil) Matheus Leist R	23.9170	23.9484	47.8654	216.607
20	15	(United States) Graham Rahal W	24.0571	23.9225	47.9796	216.092
21	19	(Canada) Zachary Claman DeMelo R	24.0635	23.9781	48.0416	215.813
22	59	(United Kingdom) Max Chilton	24.2848	24.1017	48.3865	214.275
OFFICIAL BOX SCORE

=== Race ===
Pos	No.	Driver	Team	Engine	Laps	Time/Retired	Pit Stops	Grid	Laps Led	Pts.^{1}
1	9	(New Zealand) Scott Dixon W	Chip Ganassi Racing	Honda	248	2:00:53.2155	4	7	119	53
2	22	(France) Simon Pagenaud	Team Penske	Chevrolet	248	+4.2943	4	2	26	41
3	27	(United States) Alexander Rossi	Andretti Autosport	Honda	248	+4.5670	4	8	7	36
4	5	(Canada) James Hinchcliffe	Schmidt Peterson Motorsports	Honda	248	+5.0869	4	15		32
5	28	(United States) Ryan Hunter-Reay	Andretti Autosport	Honda	248	+6.7301	5	10		30
6	15	(United States) Graham Rahal W	Rahal Letterman Lanigan Racing	Honda	248	+7.2744	5	20	5	29
7	30	(Japan) Takuma Sato	Rahal Letterman Lanigan Racing	Honda	248	+8.3457	5	9		26
8	18	(France) Sébastien Bourdais	Dale Coyne Racing with Vasser-Sullivan	Honda	248	+9.4523	5	5		24
9	10	(United Arab Emirates) Ed Jones	Chip Ganassi Racing	Honda	248	+25.0938	6	13	1	23
10	23	(United States) Charlie Kimball	Carlin	Chevrolet	247	+1 lap	5	12		20
11	21	(United States) Spencer Pigot	Ed Carpenter Racing	Chevrolet	247	+1 lap	5	18		19
12	59	(United Kingdom) Max Chilton	Carlin	Chevrolet	247	+1 lap	5	22		18
13	1	(United States) Josef Newgarden	Team Penske	Chevrolet	244	+4 laps	7	1	59	19
14	98	(United States) Marco Andretti	Andretti Herta Autosport with Curb-Agajanian	Honda	244	+4 laps	4	11		16
15	88	(Colombia) Gabby Chaves	Harding Racing	Chevrolet	240	+8 laps	7	17		15
16	26	(United States) Zach Veach R	Andretti Autosport	Honda	238	+10 laps	6	16		14
17	19	(Canada) Zachary Claman DeMelo R	Dale Coyne Racing	Honda	205	Contact	3	21		13
18	12	(Australia) Will Power W	Team Penske	Chevrolet	204	Contact	3	3		12
19	6	(Canada) Robert Wickens R	Schmidt Peterson Motorsports	Honda	171	Contact	2	4	31	12
20	20	(United States) Ed Carpenter W	Ed Carpenter Racing	Chevrolet	168	Contact	3	14		10
21	14	(Brazil) Tony Kanaan W	A. J. Foyt Enterprises	Chevrolet	31	Contact	1	6		9
22	4	(Brazil) Matheus Leist R	A. J. Foyt Enterprises	Chevrolet	5	Fire	0	9		8
OFFICIAL BOX SCORE

Notes: ^{1} Points include 1 point for leading at least 1 lap during a race, an additional 2 points for leading the most race laps, and 1 point for Pole Position.

== Championship standings after the race ==
Drivers' Championship standings

	Pos	Driver	Points
1	1	(New Zealand) Scott Dixon	357
1	2	(United States) Alexander Rossi	334
2	3	(Australia) Will Power	321
	4	(United States) Ryan Hunter-Reay	308
	5	(United States) Josef Newgarden	289

Manufacturer standings

Pos	Manufacturer	Points
1	(Japan) Honda	757
2	(United States) Chevrolet	625

- Note: Only the top five positions are included.

Previous race: 2018 Chevrolet Detroit Grand Prix	IndyCar Series; 2018 season	Next race: 2018 Kohler Grand Prix
Previous race: 2017 Rainguard Water Sealers 600	DXC Technology 600	Next race: 2019 DXC Technology 600
