= 2018 IndyCar Series =

American auto racing season

2018 IndyCar season
- Verizon IndyCar Series

Season
- Races: 17
- Start date: March 11
- End date: September 16

Awards
- Drivers' champion: (New Zealand) Scott Dixon
- Manufacturers' Cup: (Japan) Honda
- Rookie of the Year: (Canada) Robert Wickens
- Indianapolis 500 winner: (Australia) Will Power

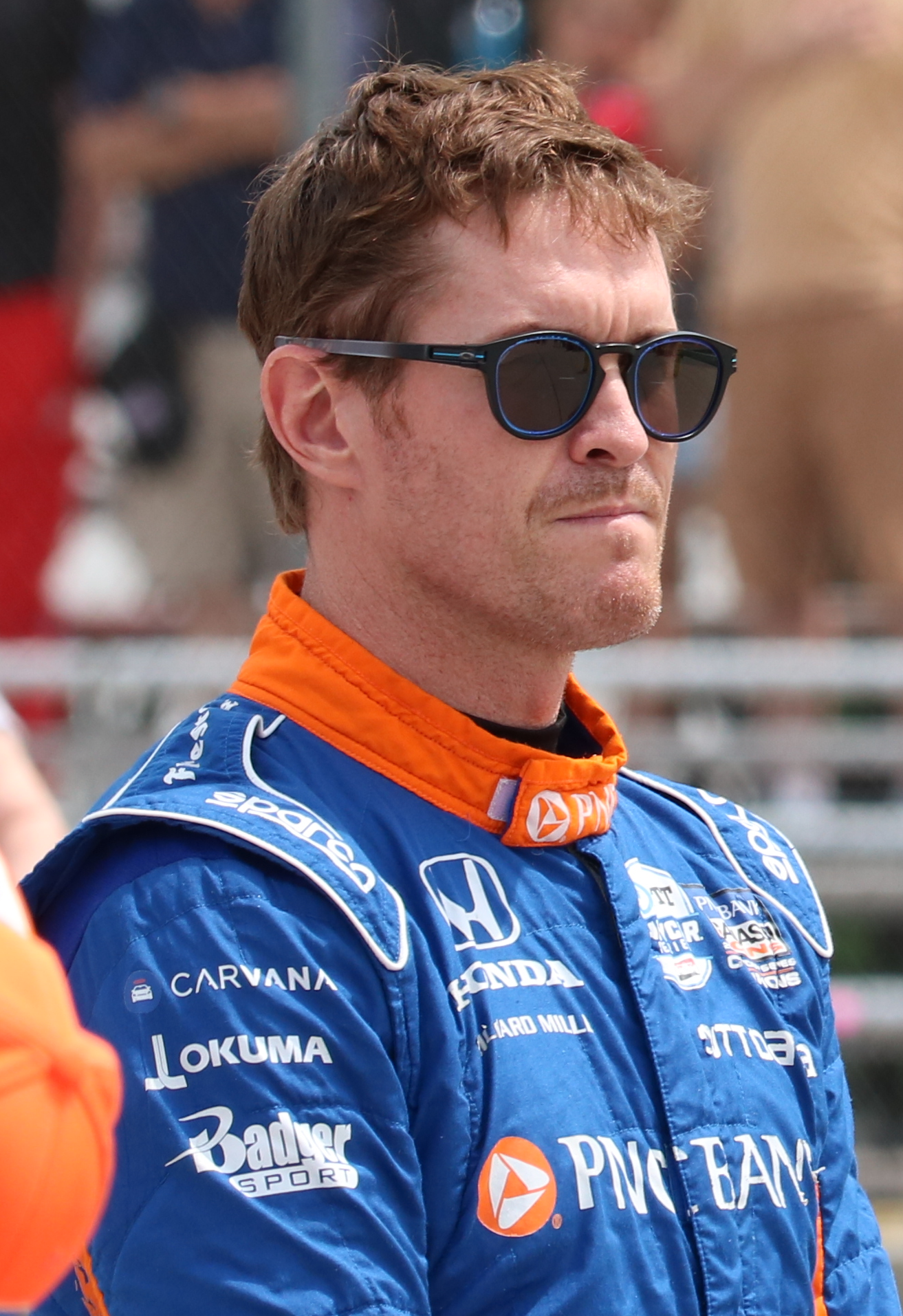
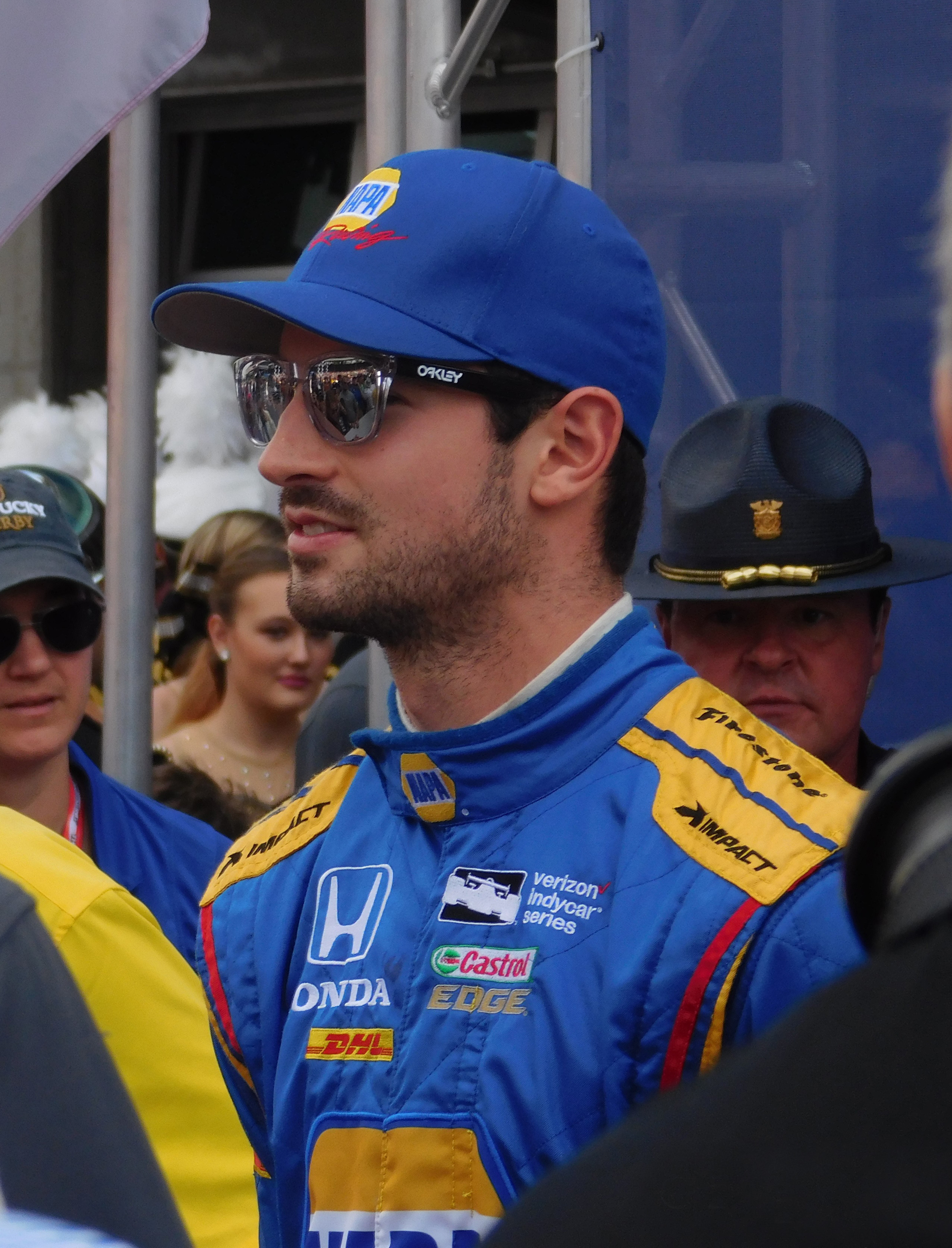
Scott Dixon (left) won his fifth Drivers' Championship while Alexander Rossi (right) finished second in the championship.

The 2018 Verizon IndyCar Series was the 23rd season of the Verizon IndyCar Series and the 107th official championship season of American open-wheel car racing. The premier event was the 102nd Indianapolis 500, with Takuma Sato entering as the defending Indianapolis 500 winner. Josef Newgarden entered the season as the defending National Champion.

The season marked the debut of a new universal aerokit, replacing the manufacturer-designed kits used from 2015 to 2017.

It was the final season for Verizon Communications as the series sponsor as well as being the final season that the series was broadcast by both ABC and NBC Sports. A new series sponsor was introduced and NBC became the sole broadcaster for the series beginning in the 2019 season.

Honda won the engine manufacturer's championship for the first time since 2005 as an engine manufacturer competitor. Robert Wickens won Rookie of the Year despite missing the final three races after the season was overshadowed by a near life ending crash by Wickens at the ABC Supply 500 at Pocono that left him paralyzed. James Hinchcliffe won the most popular driver award. Will Power won the 102nd Indianapolis 500. Scott Dixon won his fifth IndyCar title, and is now second to A. J. Foyt's all-time record for United States open wheel titles. Dixon won three races over the course of the season.

== Series news ==
- On October 20, 2017, Verizon Communications announced that it would exit its title sponsorship deal for the series after the 2018 season. This will not affect its vehicle sponsorship with Team Penske.
- PFC became the IndyCar Series' brake caliper supplier beginning in the 2018 season.
- Kyle Novak was confirmed as Race Director on January 5, replacing Brian Barnhart, who left to become president of Harding Racing. The three-man stewarding panel of Dan Davis, Arie Luyendyk and Max Papis, introduced when Barnhart was first named Race Director, will remain intact.
- On March 21, 2018, NBC Sports (which serves as the existing cable rightsholder of the series through NBCSN) announced that it would become the sole television rights-holder of the IndyCar Series from 2019 through 2021, replacing the previous split between ABC and NBCSN. Eight races per season will air on NBC, including the Indianapolis 500.

== Technical changes ==
- All IndyCar Series entrants would feature an all-new universal bodywork. This new chassis configuration is dubbed the IR18 as a second facelift of Dallara DW12, and will be used until 2027. For the first time since the 1996 Indy Racing League and 2007 Champ Car seasons respectively, cars will have a roll hoop without an airbox.
- All IndyCar Series entrants would begin utilizing F1-style LCD steering wheel display dashes, a new Cosworth CCW Mk2 steering wheel with a configurable display unit, and new electronic components. The current Cosworth-Pi Research Sigma Wheel Display dash had been used since the 2000 season will be retired permanently, but several teams will opt to keep the old Cosworth Sigma Wheel Display dash for one more season due to cost reasons.
- Due to the reduced amount of downforce produced by the 2018 spec aerokits, Firestone introduced new rain tires to improve grip in wet conditions for road/street races.
- In the next step to increase driver safety through cockpit protection, IndyCar announced that Scott Dixon would test a windscreen, a possible alternative to the 'halo' device used by Formula One, at ISM Raceway on February 8.

== Confirmed entries ==
The following teams, entries, and drivers have been announced to compete in the 2018 Verizon IndyCar Series season. All teams will use a spec Dallara DW12 chassis with UAK18 aero kit and Firestone tires.

Team	Engine	No.	Driver(s)	Round(s)
A. J. Foyt Enterprises	Chevrolet	4	(Brazil) Matheus Leist R	All
A. J. Foyt Enterprises	Chevrolet	14	(Brazil) Tony Kanaan	All
Foyt with Byrd / Hollinger / Belardi	Chevrolet	33	(Australia) James Davison R (Note: James Davison is considered a rookie in the IndyCar Series; however, he was not a rookie in the 2018 Indianapolis 500 as he participated in the Indy 500 in 2014, 2015, and 2017.)	6
Andretti Autosport	Honda	25	(United Kingdom) Stefan Wilson R (Note: Stefan Wilson is considered a rookie in the IndyCar Series; however, he was not a rookie in the 2018 Indianapolis 500 as he participated in the 2016 Indianapolis 500.)	6
Andretti Autosport	Honda	26	(United States) Zach Veach R	All
Andretti Autosport	Honda	27	(United States) Alexander Rossi	All
Andretti Autosport	Honda	28	(United States) Ryan Hunter-Reay	All
Andretti Autosport	Honda	29	(Colombia) Carlos Muñoz	6
Andretti Herta Autosport with Curb-Agajanian	Honda	98	(United States) Marco Andretti	All
Carlin	Chevrolet	23	(United States) Charlie Kimball	All
Carlin	Chevrolet	59	(United Kingdom) Max Chilton	All
Chip Ganassi Racing	Honda	9	(New Zealand) Scott Dixon	All
Chip Ganassi Racing	Honda	10	(United Arab Emirates) Ed Jones	All
Dale Coyne Racing	Honda	19	(Canada) Zachary Claman DeMelo R	1, 3–6, 9–12
Dale Coyne Racing	Honda	19	(Brazil) Pietro Fittipaldi R	2, 13–17
Dale Coyne Racing	Honda	19	(United States) Santino Ferrucci R	7–8
Dale Coyne Racing	Honda	39	(United States) Santino Ferrucci R	16–17
Dale Coyne Racing	Honda	63	(United Kingdom) Pippa Mann	6
Dale Coyne Racing dba Thom Burns Racing	Honda	17	(United States) Conor Daly	6
Dale Coyne Racing with Vasser Sullivan	Honda	18	(France) Sébastien Bourdais	All
Dreyer & Reinbold Racing	Chevrolet	24	(United States) Sage Karam	6
Dreyer & Reinbold Racing	Chevrolet	66	(United States) J. R. Hildebrand	6
Ed Carpenter Racing	Chevrolet	13	(United States) Danica Patrick	6
Ed Carpenter Racing	Chevrolet	20	(United Kingdom) Jordan King R	1, 3–5, 7–8, 10, 12–13, 16–17
Ed Carpenter Racing	Chevrolet	20	(United States) Ed Carpenter	2, 6, 9, 11, 14–15
Ed Carpenter Racing	Chevrolet	21	(United States) Spencer Pigot	All
Harding Racing	Chevrolet	8	(Mexico) Patricio O'Ward R	17
Harding Racing	Chevrolet	88	(Colombia) Gabby Chaves	1–11, 15–16
Harding Racing	Chevrolet	88	(United States) Conor Daly	12–14
Harding Racing	Chevrolet	88	(United States) Colton Herta R	17
Juncos Racing	Chevrolet	32	(Austria) René Binder R	1, 4, 7–8, 12–13
Juncos Racing	Chevrolet	32	(United States) Kyle Kaiser R	2–3, 5–6
Juncos Racing	Chevrolet	32	(Mexico) Alfonso Celis Jr. R	10, 16
Michael Shank Racing with Schmidt Peterson; Meyer Shank Racing with Schmidt Peterson	Honda	60	(United Kingdom) Jack Harvey R	1, 3, 6, 13, 16–17
Rahal Letterman Lanigan Racing	Honda	15	(United States) Graham Rahal	All
Rahal Letterman Lanigan Racing	Honda	30	(Japan) Takuma Sato	All
Scuderia Corsa with RLL	Honda	64	(Spain) Oriol Servià	6
Schmidt Peterson Motorsports	Honda	5	(Canada) James Hinchcliffe	All
Schmidt Peterson Motorsports	Honda	6	(Canada) Robert Wickens R	1–14
Schmidt Peterson Motorsports	Honda	6	(Colombia) Carlos Muñoz	16–17
SPM / AFS Racing	Honda	7	(United Kingdom) Jay Howard	6
Team Penske	Chevrolet	1	(United States) Josef Newgarden	All
Team Penske	Chevrolet	3	(Brazil) Hélio Castroneves	5–6
Team Penske	Chevrolet	12	(Australia) Will Power	All
Team Penske	Chevrolet	22	(France) Simon Pagenaud	All

R Eligible for Rookie of the Year

=== Team changes ===
Chip Ganassi Racing announced that the team will scale down to a two-car team for the first time since 2010 due to cost efficiency, with Scott Dixon remaining at the No. 9 car. CGR announced on October 25, 2017, that 2017 IndyCar Series Rookie of the Year Ed Jones would drive the No. 10 car in 2018, replacing Tony Kanaan.

Team Penske also downsized to three cars, due to Hélio Castroneves moving to Team Penske's WeatherTech SportsCar Championship team from the 2018 season onwards. However, Castroneves returned for the 2018 Indianapolis 500 with Team Penske for a one-off appearance.

Michael Shank Racing competed in six races in the 2018 season with driver Jack Harvey, with a technical partnership with Schmidt Peterson Motorsports. The team was renamed Meyer Shank Racing on April 6, 2018, after SiriusXM CEO Jim Meyer joined as a team co-owner.

Carlin entered the series with two full-time Chevrolet-powered entries for the 2018 season, running ex-Chip Ganassi Racing drivers Max Chilton and Charlie Kimball.

Harding Racing confirmed a full-time schedule with Gabby Chaves after running part-time in 2017. Indy Lights driver Santiago Urrutia was signed as the teams' second driver, but the team backflipped on the deal before the season started. Brian Barnhart was named president of the team on November 29, leaving his post as president of race operations and race director of IndyCar. Following the Road America round, Barnhart confirmed rumours that they wish to expand to fielding two cars as early as the latter part of the 2018 season, specifically naming Sonoma. He further confirmed the team was in talks with several drivers including current Indy Lights drivers.

Lazier Partners Racing did not enter the Indianapolis 500 for the first time since 2012 due to crash damage incurred at the 2017 Indianapolis 500 by Buddy Lazier to their only car.

=== Driver changes ===
After winning the 2017 Indy Lights championship, Kyle Kaiser participated in four IndyCar events in 2018 with Juncos Racing, including the Indianapolis 500 and IndyCar Grand Prix. On January 5, 2018, Juncos announced Formula V8 3.5 driver René Binder would contest the races in St. Petersburg, Barber, Mid-Ohio, and Toronto, with an entry at Detroit being confirmed later.

After competing at Barber for Ed Carpenter Racing as a replacement for J. R. Hildebrand and at the Indianapolis 500 for A. J. Foyt Enterprises in 2017, Zach Veach made his full-season début with Andretti Autosport, replacing Takuma Sato.

After competing in road and street courses only for Ed Carpenter Racing in 2017, Spencer Pigot made his full-season début with the team, replacing J. R. Hildebrand in the No. 21 car. Former Formula 2 driver Jordan King will drive the No. 20 on road and street courses.

2017 Indianapolis 500 winner Takuma Sato left Andretti Autosport after only one season with the team, and returned to Rahal Letterman Lanigan Racing for the 2018 season.

Stefan Wilson joined Andretti Autosport to return to the Indianapolis 500 for the first time since 2016.

After spending four seasons with Chip Ganassi Racing, Tony Kanaan switched to A. J. Foyt Enterprises for the 2018 season.

After six seasons in the German Deutsche Tourenwagen Masters, Robert Wickens made the switch to IndyCar to drive the No. 6 car for Schmidt Peterson Motorsports, replacing Mikhail Aleshin. Wickens previously replaced Aleshin in the first practice session at Road America in 2017, but did not get to compete in the race. Wickens suffered severe injuries in a crash at the 2018 ABC Supply 500 and was forced to miss the rest of the season. Due to damage incurred in the crash, the #6 car was withdrawn for the next race at Gateway. On August 29, SPM announced Carlos Muñoz as Wickens' replacement in the #6 car at the Portland and Sonoma rounds.

On November 16, 2017, A. J. Foyt Enterprises announced that Brazilian Indy Lights driver Matheus Leist would drive the No. 4 car in 2018, replacing Conor Daly. Leist became the youngest IndyCar Series rookie since Marco Andretti in 2006.

After six seasons with Stewart–Haas Racing in NASCAR, Danica Patrick announced intentions to return to the Indianapolis 500 for the first time since 2011. The 2018 Indianapolis 500 was the last race of Patrick's professional career. She ran a third entry for Ed Carpenter Racing, carrying sponsorship from former long-time partner GoDaddy.

After spending one season with A. J. Foyt Enterprises, Carlos Muñoz rejoined Andretti Autosport for the Indianapolis 500.

On February 6, 2018, 2017 World Series Formula V8 3.5 champion Pietro Fittipaldi was announced to drive the #19 for Dale Coyne Racing in seven races, including the 2018 Indianapolis 500. The #19 was driven by Zachary Claman DeMelo, who partook in the 2017 Indy Lights season with Carlin and the 2017 GoPro Grand Prix of Sonoma with Rahal Letterman Lanigan Racing, in the other 10 events. On May 4, Fittipaldi was injured in a crash while qualifying for the 2018 6 Hours of Spa-Francorchamps. DeMelo took over the #19 for both Indianapolis races and Texas, while Trident Formula 2 driver and Haas F1 test driver Santino Ferrucci was signed for the two Detroit races.

On March 1, 2018, it was confirmed that Nazareth, Pennsylvania native Sage Karam would return to race in the 102nd Indianapolis 500 for Dreyer & Reinbold Racing. This was the 3rd straight and 4th total Indianapolis 500 between them. The primary sponsor for Karam's car was WIX Filters.

On March 6, 2018, it was announced Conor Daly would be drive in the 102nd Indianapolis 500. He raced for Thom Burns Racing with Air Force as the primary sponsor.

On March 20, 2018, it was announced Pippa Mann would drive a 4th car for Dale Coyne Racing at the Indianapolis 500, with sponsorship from Donate Life Indiana.

On April 12, Dreyer & Reinbold Racing announced that J. R. Hildebrand would drive for the team in their second entry into the Indianapolis 500.

On April 13, 2018, it was announced that Jonathan Byrd's Racing, Hollinger MotorSport, and Belardi Auto Racing would work in conjunction with A. J. Foyt Enterprises to field a car for James Davison for the Indianapolis 500.

On May 10, Juncos Racing announced that Alfonso Celis Jr. would make his IndyCar debut with the team at Road America. On August 3, the team announced that Celis would also compete at Portland.

On July 10, Harding Racing announced that Conor Daly would replace Gabby Chaves for round 12 in Toronto. The team also stated that they would experiment with their driver lineup for the remainder of the season in preparation for 2019. They want to test current top three Indy Lights drivers Colton Herta, Santiago Urrutia and Patricio O'Ward, the latter having already received a seat fitting with the team. Nevertheless, Chaves is expected to return to the track in 2018 and remain under contract as the team's driver through 2019. Daly would be confirmed for the Mid-Ohio round on July 24. On September 2, it was announced that 2018 Indy Lights champion Patricio O'Ward and 2018 Indy Lights runner-up Colton Herta would make their IndyCar debuts with Harding at the final round at Sonoma.

== Schedule ==
Icon	Legend
O	Oval/Speedway
R	Road course
S	Street circuit

Rd.	Date	Race name	Track	City
1	March 11	Firestone Grand Prix of St. Petersburg	S Streets of St. Petersburg	St. Petersburg, Florida
2	April 7	Desert Diamond West Valley Phoenix Grand Prix	O ISM Raceway	Avondale, Arizona
3	April 15	Toyota Grand Prix of Long Beach	S Streets of Long Beach	Long Beach, California
4	April 22/23*	Honda Indy Grand Prix of Alabama	R Barber Motorsports Park	Birmingham, Alabama
5	May 12	IndyCar Grand Prix	R Indianapolis Motor Speedway Road Course	Speedway, Indiana
6	May 27	102nd Indianapolis 500 presented by PennGrade Motor Oil	O Indianapolis Motor Speedway	Speedway, Indiana
7	June 2	Chevrolet Detroit Grand Prix presented by Lear Corporation	S Belle Isle Park	Detroit, Michigan
8	June 3	Chevrolet Detroit Grand Prix presented by Lear Corporation	S Belle Isle Park	Detroit, Michigan
9	June 9	DXC Technology 600	O Texas Motor Speedway	Fort Worth, Texas
10	June 24	Kohler Grand Prix	R Road America	Elkhart Lake, Wisconsin
11	July 8	Iowa Corn 300	O Iowa Speedway	Newton, Iowa
12	July 15	Honda Indy Toronto	S Exhibition Place	Toronto, Ontario, Canada
13	July 29	Honda Indy 200 at Mid-Ohio	R Mid-Ohio Sports Car Course	Lexington, Ohio
14	August 19	ABC Supply 500	O Pocono Raceway	Long Pond, Pennsylvania
15	August 25	Bommarito Automotive Group 500 presented by Valvoline	O Gateway Motorsports Park	Madison, Illinois
16	September 2	Grand Prix of Portland	R Portland International Raceway	Portland, Oregon
17	September 16	Indycar Grand Prix of Sonoma	R Sonoma Raceway	Sonoma, California

=== Schedule changes and notes ===
- On September 26, 2017, Phoenix International Raceway's name was changed to ISM Raceway after a $100 million sponsorship deal with Ingenuity Sun Media, or ISM.
- Watkins Glen was dropped from the calendar, after only two races since its return in 2016. The round was replaced with a race at Portland International Raceway, after an 11-year absence since Portland's last Champ Car event.
- The Autódromo Hermanos Rodríguez in Mexico City was explored as a possible host of a race in August, but the deal was not put together and the race was not put on the calendar.
- The Honda Indy Grand Prix of Alabama was started on April 22 and was stopped due to rain on lap 22. The race was resumed on April 23.

== Results ==
Rd.	Race	Pole position	Fastest lap	Most laps led	Race winners			Report
Rd.	Race	Pole position	Fastest lap	Most laps led	Driver	Team	Manufacturer	Report
1	St. Petersburg	(Canada) Robert Wickens	(United States) Alexander Rossi	(Canada) Robert Wickens	(France) Sébastien Bourdais	Dale Coyne Racing with Vasser-Sullivan	Honda	Report
2	Phoenix	(France) Sébastien Bourdais	(France) Sébastien Bourdais	(Australia) Will Power	(United States) Josef Newgarden	Team Penske	Chevrolet	Report
3	Long Beach	(United States) Alexander Rossi	(United States) Josef Newgarden	(United States) Alexander Rossi	(United States) Alexander Rossi	Andretti Autosport	Honda	Report
4	Birmingham	(United States) Josef Newgarden	(Canada) Zachary Claman DeMelo	(United States) Josef Newgarden	(United States) Josef Newgarden	Team Penske	Chevrolet	Report
5	Indianapolis GP	(Australia) Will Power	(New Zealand) Scott Dixon	(Australia) Will Power	(Australia) Will Power	Team Penske	Chevrolet	Report
6	Indianapolis 500	(United States) Ed Carpenter	(Brazil) Hélio Castroneves	(United States) Ed Carpenter	(Australia) Will Power	Team Penske	Chevrolet	Report
7	Detroit 1	(United States) Marco Andretti (Note: The qualification format for this race featured two separate qualification groups, with the fastest qualifier in each group earning a championship point; the faster of the two group fastest qualifiers would then start on pole, while the other would start from the outside of the front row. Andretti set the fastest overall lap, and was awarded the pole position. Scott Dixon set the fastest lap in the other qualifying group, and was also awarded a championship point.)	(United States) Ryan Hunter-Reay	(New Zealand) Scott Dixon	(New Zealand) Scott Dixon	Chip Ganassi Racing	Honda	Report
8	Detroit 2	(United States) Alexander Rossi (Note: The qualification format for this race featured two separate qualification groups, with the fastest qualifier in each group earning a championship point; the faster of the two group fastest qualifiers would then start on pole, while the other would start from the outside of the front row. Rossi set the fastest overall lap, and was awarded the pole position. Robert Wickens set the fastest lap in the other qualifying group, and was also awarded a championship point.)	(United States) Ryan Hunter-Reay	(United States) Alexander Rossi	(United States) Ryan Hunter-Reay	Andretti Autosport	Honda	Report
9	Texas	(United States) Josef Newgarden	(United States) Josef Newgarden	(New Zealand) Scott Dixon	(New Zealand) Scott Dixon	Chip Ganassi Racing	Honda	Report
10	Road America	(United States) Josef Newgarden	(United States) Zach Veach	(United States) Josef Newgarden	(United States) Josef Newgarden	Team Penske	Chevrolet	Report
11	Iowa	(Australia) Will Power	(Australia) Will Power	(United States) Josef Newgarden	(Canada) James Hinchcliffe	Schmidt Peterson Motorsports	Honda	Report
12	Toronto	(United States) Josef Newgarden	(Australia) Will Power	(New Zealand) Scott Dixon	(New Zealand) Scott Dixon	Chip Ganassi Racing	Honda	Report
13	Mid-Ohio	(United States) Alexander Rossi	(New Zealand) Scott Dixon	(United States) Alexander Rossi	(United States) Alexander Rossi	Andretti Autosport	Honda	Report
14	Pocono	(Australia) Will Power	(France) Sébastien Bourdais	(United States) Alexander Rossi	(United States) Alexander Rossi	Andretti Autosport	Honda	Report
15	Gateway	(New Zealand) Scott Dixon (Note: Qualifying for the Bommarito Automotive Group 500 was cancelled due to weather. The grid was set by entrant points, so Scott Dixon was gifted the pole position. Because of this, he was not awarded the bonus point typically awarded for qualifying on pole position.)	(Australia) Will Power	(New Zealand) Scott Dixon	(Australia) Will Power	Team Penske	Chevrolet	Report
16	Portland	(Australia) Will Power	(Colombia) Carlos Muñoz	(United States) Alexander Rossi	(Japan) Takuma Sato	Rahal Letterman Lanigan Racing	Honda	Report
17	Sonoma	(United States) Ryan Hunter-Reay	(New Zealand) Scott Dixon	(United States) Ryan Hunter-Reay	(United States) Ryan Hunter-Reay	Andretti Autosport	Honda	Report

== Points standings ==
- Ties are broken by number of wins, followed by number of 2nds, 3rds, etc., then by number of pole positions, followed by number of times qualified 2nd, etc.

=== Driver standings ===
- The Indianapolis 500 and Sonoma rounds award double points.
- At all races except the Indy 500, the number 1 qualifier earns one point. At double header races, the fastest qualifier of each qualifying group earns one championship point.
- Entrant-initiated engine change-outs before the engines reach their required distance run will result in the loss of ten points.
  - NOTE: The distance run will be based on the total distance raced by that entrant with the engine in question, regardless of driver.

Pos	Driver	STP	PHX	LBH	BAR	IGP	INDY	BEL		TMS	ROA	IOW	TOR	MOH	POC	GTW	POR	SON	Pts
1	(New Zealand) Scott Dixon	6	4	11	6	2	3^{9}	1*	4	1*	3	12	1*	5	3	**3***^{c}	5	2	678
2	(United States) Alexander Rossi	3	3	**1***	11	5	4	3	**12***	3	16	9	8	**1***	1*	2	8*	7	621
3	(Australia) Will Power	10	22*	2	21	**1***	1^{3}	7	2	18	23	**6**	18	3	**2**	1	**21**	3	582
4	(United States) Ryan Hunter-Reay	5	5	20	2	18	5	2	1	5	2	19	16	7	18	20	2	**1***	566
5	(United States) Josef Newgarden	7	1	7	**1***	11	8^{4}	9	15	**13**	**1***	4*	**9**	4	5	7	10	8	560
6	(France) Simon Pagenaud	13	10	24	9	8	6^{2}	17	10	2	7	8	2	8	8	4	6	4	492
7	(France) Sébastien Bourdais	1	**13**	13	5	4	28^{5}	13	21	8	13	11	19	6	4	21	3	6	425
8	(United States) Graham Rahal	2	9	5	7	9	10	23	5	6	6	7	21	9	14	10	23	23	392
9	(United States) Marco Andretti	9	12	6	10	13	12	**4**	9	14	11	16	10	11	7	14	25	5	392
10	(Canada) James Hinchcliffe	4	6	9	3	7	DNQ	11	16	4	10	1	4	14	20	15	22	15	391
11	(Canada) Robert Wickens RY	**18***	2	22	4	3	9	8	6	19	5	5	3	2	19				391
12	(Japan) Takuma Sato	12	11	21	8	10	32	5	17	7	4	3	22	17	21	9	1	25	351
13	(United Arab Emirates) Ed Jones	8	20	3	20	22	31	6	3	9	9	13	12	15	12	8	24	10	343
14	(United States) Spencer Pigot	15	14	15	15	15	20^{6}	10	23	11	8	2	20	13	16	6	4	24	325
15	(United States) Zach Veach R	16	16	4	13	23	23	12	13	16	22	20	7	10	6	5	19	14	313
16	(Brazil) Tony Kanaan	11	8	8	18	14	25	14	7	21	14	17	6	18	17	13	11	12	312
17	(United States) Charlie Kimball	20	17	10	23	20	18	19	8	10	18	14	5	16	9	19	7	22	287
18	(Brazil) Matheus Leist R	24	19	14	12	21	13	15	14	22	15	22	15	19	11	16	14	19	253
19	(United Kingdom) Max Chilton	19	18	17	22	16	22	20	11	12	17	15	23	24	13	17	18	21	223
20	(United States) Ed Carpenter		7				**2***^{1}			20		10			10	12			187
21	(Colombia) Gabby Chaves	14	15	19	17	17	14	18	19	15	19	21				18	13		187
22	(United Kingdom) Jordan King R	21		18	14	24		16	18		12		11	12			15	13	175
23	(Canada) Zachary Claman DeMelo R	17		23	19	12	19			17	21	18	14						122
24	(United Kingdom) Jack Harvey R	23		12			16							20			16	17	103
25	(Colombia) Carlos Muñoz						7										12	18	95
26	(Brazil) Pietro Fittipaldi R		23											23	22	11	9	16	91
27	(United States) Santino Ferrucci R							22	20								20	11	66
28	(Austria) René Binder R	22			16			21	22				17	21					61
29	(United States) Conor Daly						21						13	22	15				58
30	(United States) Kyle Kaiser R		21	16		19	29												45
31	(Mexico) Patricio O'Ward R																	9	44
32	(Brazil) Hélio Castroneves					6	27^{8}												40
33	(United States) J. R. Hildebrand						11												38
34	(United Kingdom) Stefan Wilson R						15												31
35	(Spain) Oriol Servià						17												27
36	(Mexico) Alfonso Celis Jr. R										20						17		23
37	(United States) Colton Herta R																	20	20
38	(United States) Danica Patrick						30^{7}												13
39	(United Kingdom) Jay Howard						24												12
40	(United States) Sage Karam						26												10
41	(Australia) James Davison R						33												10
–	(United Kingdom) Pippa Mann						DNQ												0
Pos	Driver	STP	PHX	LBH	BAR	IGP	INDY	BEL		TMS	ROA	IOW	TOR	MOH	POC	GTW	POR	SON	Pts

Color	Result
Gold	Winner
Silver	2nd place
Bronze	3rd place
Green	4th & 5th place
Light Blue	6th–10th place
Dark Blue	Finished (Outside Top 10)
Purple	Did not finish
Red	Did not qualify (DNQ)
Brown	Withdrawn (Wth)
Black	Disqualified (DSQ)
White	Did Not Start (DNS)
White	Race abandoned (C)
Blank	Did not participate

**In-line notation**
**Bold**	Pole position (1 point; except Indy)
Italics	Ran fastest race lap
*	Led most race laps (2 points)
DNS	Any driver who qualifies but does not start (DNS), earns half the points had they taken part.
^{1–9}	Indy 500 "Fast 9" result, with points as follows: 9 points for 1st 8 points for 2nd and so on down to 1 point for 9th.
^{c}	Qualifying canceled no bonus point awarded
RY	Rookie of the Year
R	Rookie

=== Entrant standings ===
- Based on the entrant, used for oval qualifications order, and starting grids when qualifying is cancelled.
- Only full-time entrants, and at-large part-time entrants shown.

Pos	Driver	STP	PHX	LBH	BAR	IGP	INDY	BEL		TMS	ROA	IOW	TOR	MOH	POC	GTW	POR	SON	Pts
1	#9 Chip Ganassi Racing	6	4	11	6	2	3^{9}	1*	4	1*	3	12	1*	5	3	**3***^{c}	5	2	678
2	#27 Andretti Autosport	3	3	**1***	11	5	4	3	**12***	3	16	9	8	**1***	1*	2	8*	7	621
3	#12 Team Penske	10	22*	2	21	**1***	1^{3}	7	2	18	23	**6**	18	3	**2**	1	**21**	3	582
4	#28 Andretti Autosport	5	5	20	2	18	5	2	1	5	2	19	16	7	18	20	2	**1***	566
5	#1 Team Penske	7	1	7	**1***	11	8^{4}	9	15	**13**	**1***	4*	**9**	4	5	7	10	8	560
6	#22 Team Penske	13	10	24	9	8	6^{2}	17	10	2	7	8	2	8	8	4	6	4	492
7	#6 Schmidt Peterson Motorsports	**18***	2	22	4	3	9	8	6	19	5	5	3	2	19		12	18	433
8	#18 Dale Coyne Racing with Vasser-Sullivan	1	**13**	13	5	4	28^{5}	13	21	8	13	11	19	6	4	21	3	6	425
9	#15 Rahal Letterman Lanigan Racing	2	9	5	7	9	10	23	5	6	6	7	21	9	14	10	23	23	392
10	#98 Andretti Herta Autosport with Curb-Agajanian	9	12	6	10	13	12	**4**	9	14	11	16	10	11	7	14	25	5	392
11	#5 Schmidt Peterson Motorsports	4	6	9	3	7	DNQ	11	16	4	10	1	4	14	20	15	22	15	391
12	#20 Ed Carpenter Racing	21	7	18	14	24	**2***^{1}	16	18	20	12	10	11	12	10	12	15	13	362
13	#30 Rahal Letterman Lanigan Racing	12	11	21	8	10	32	5	17	7	4	3	22	17	21	9	1	25	351
14	#10 Chip Ganassi Racing	8	20	3	20	22	31	6	3	9	9	13	12	15	12	8	24	10	343
15	#21 Ed Carpenter Racing	15	14	15	15	15	20^{6}	10	23	11	8	2	20	13	16	6	4	24	325
16	#26 Andretti Autosport	16	16	4	13	23	23	12	13	16	22	20	7	10	6	5	19	14	313
17	#14 A. J. Foyt Enterprises	11	8	8	18	14	25	14	7	21	14	17	6	18	17	13	11	12	312
18	#23 Carlin	20	17	10	23	20	18	19	8	10	18	14	5	16	9	19	7	22	287
19	#4 A. J. Foyt Enterprises	24	19	14	12	21	13	15	14	22	15	22	15	19	11	16	14	19	253
20	#88 Harding Racing	14	15	19	17	17	14	18	19	15	19	21	13	22	15	18	13	20	247
21	#19 Dale Coyne Racing	17	23	23	19	12	19	22	20	17	21	18	14	23	22	11	9	16	231
22	#59 Carlin	19	18	17	22	16	22	20	11	12	17	15	23	24	13	17	18	21	223
23	#32 Juncos Racing	22	21	16	16	19	29	21	22		20		17	21			17		129
24	#60 Meyer Shank Racing with Schmidt Peterson	23		12			16							20			16	17	103
Pos	Driver	STP	PHX	LBH	BAR	IGP	INDY	BEL		TMS	ROA	IOW	TOR	MOH	POC	GTW	POR	SON	Pts

=== Manufacturer standings ===
Pos	Manufacturer	STP	PHX	LBH	BAR	IGP	INDY	BEL		TMS	ROA	IOW	TOR	MOH	POC	GTW	POR	SON	Pts
1	Honda	1	2	1	2	2	3	1	1	1	2	1	1	1	1	2	1	1	1467
1	Honda	2	3	3	3	3	4	2	3	3	3	3	3	2	3	3	2	2	1467
1	Honda	**96***	76	**91***	76	75	67	**96***	**91***	**90***	75	**90***	**90***	**96***	**90***	77	**95***	**96***	1467
2	Chevrolet	7	1	2	1	1	1	7	2	2	1	2	2	3	2	1	4	3	1203
2	Chevrolet	10	7	7	9	6	2	9	7	10	7	4	5	4	5	4	6	4	1203
2	Chevrolet	46	**81***	66	**77***	**84***	**98***	48	66	61	**82***	73	71	67	71	**87***	61	67	1203

- All manufacturer points (including qualifying points, race finish points, and race win bonus points) can only be earned by full-season entrants.
- The top two finishing entrants from each manufacturer in each race score championship points for their respective manufacturer. The manufacturer that wins each race will be awarded five additional points, which can be determined through **bold** in-line notation.
- At all races except the Indy 500, the manufacturer who qualifies on pole earns one point. At the Indy 500, the fastest Saturday qualifier earns one point, while the pole position winner on Sunday earns two points. It can be determined through italic in-line notation. But, in Gateway, as qualifying was rained out, no point will be awarded for pole position.
- The manufacturer with the most points from each race is noted by an asterisk (*).
- For every full-season engine used during the Indy 500 that reaches 2,000 total miles run, the manufacturer earns bonus points equal to that engine's finishing position in the race.
- Ties are broken by number of wins, followed by number of 2nds, 3rds, etc.
