= Kyle Kaiser =

American racing driver (born 1996)

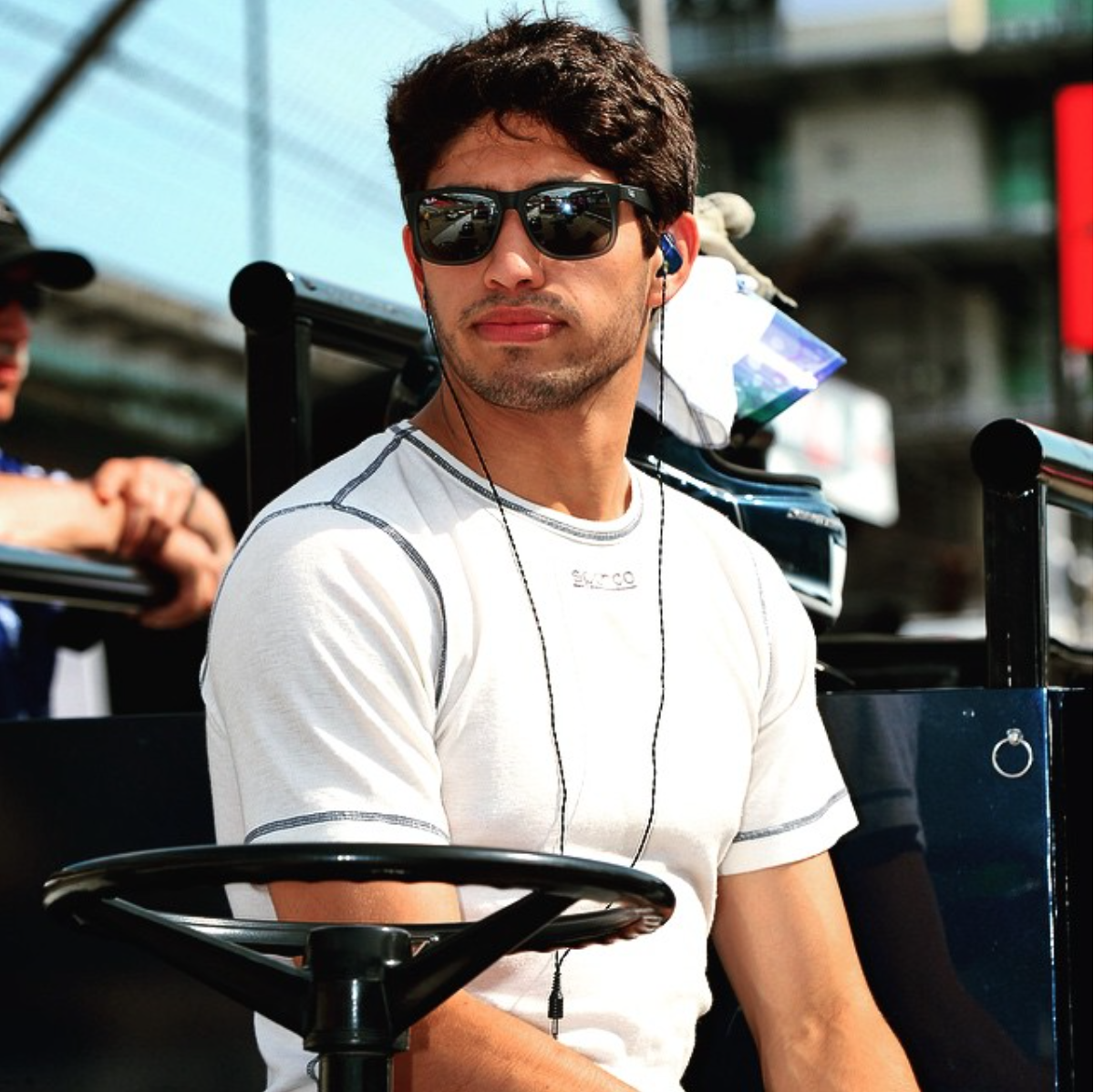
- Kaiser in 2015
- Nationality: (United States) American
- Born: March 5, 1996 (age 30) Santa Clara, California, U.S.

Motorsports career
- Debut season: 2012
- Current team: Juncos Racing
- Categorisation: FIA Gold
- Car number: 32
- Former teams: World Speed Motorsports
- Starts: 79
- Wins: 6
- Poles: 6

Championship titles
- 2012 2017: Formula Car Challenge; Indy Lights

Kyle Kaiser (born March 5, 1996) is an American racing driver from Santa Clara, California. He won the 2017 Indy Lights Championship with Juncos Racing. He is also currently enrolled in classes part-time at Santa Clara University in Santa Clara, California.

== Racing career ==
=== Karting ===
From 2003 to 2009, Kaiser competed in the International Kart Federation, in the IKF Regional Race Series, 2-Cycle Sprint Grand Nationals, and the Stars of Karting. In 2008, he claimed his first national championship in the HPV-1 class. In 2009, he won the Infinion Raceway 3 hr Karting Enduro.

=== Skip Barber ===
Kaiser joined Skip Barber Racing School's 2009/10 Western Regional Championship, earning second place and Rookie of the Year. In 2011, he returned to the series, earning third place in the championship. That year, he also participated in the Skip Barber Karting Scholarship shootout, earning a partial season scholarship with the race series.

=== Formula Car Challenge ===
In 2012, Kaiser competed in the Formula Car Challenge for World Speed Motorsports, in the Pro Mazda and FormulaSPEED classes. He earned the Pro Mazda championship title by winning eight races, and finishing on the podium in eleven out of the fourteen races.

=== Pro Mazda ===
Kaiser made his professional open wheel racing debut in September 2012 in the Star Mazda Championship at Mazda Raceway Laguna Seca. For the 2013 season, Kaiser joined World Speed Motorsports to race full-time in the Pro Mazda Championship. He finished seventh in the championship with a best finish of fifth (three times). He returns to the series for 2014, but switched teams to past series champions Juncos Racing. He finished on the podium in the first race of the 2014 Pro Mazda Winterfest. He finished the 2014 season sixth in points, recording four podium finishes and earning his first professional victory at Sonoma Raceway in the season finale.

=== Indy Lights ===
For 2015, Kaiser moved up to Indy Lights with juncos racing . He scored two podiums and seven top-fives out of sixteen races, finishing sixth in the season standings. In 2016, he claimed two wins and eight podiums in eighteen races, which put him third in the final classification. He signed with Juncos Racing for a third Indy Lights season in 2017 and won the Championship to claim the $1 million scholarship to race in IndyCar.

=== IndyCar ===
Kaiser announced he would move up to the Verizon IndyCar series with Juncos Racing for four races in 2018.

Kaiser competed in select IndyCar Series events with Juncos between 2018 and 2019. He is best known for knocking two time Formula One world champion Fernando Alonso out of the 2019 Indianapolis 500 by qualifying in the last possible spot on the grid, ending Alonso's joint McLaren/Carlin effort. Kaiser would not compete in either the 2020 IndyCar Series or 2021 IndyCar Series, as Juncos was trying to recoup financial losses brought on by the COVID-19 pandemic and would not be able to run their traditional Indianapolis 500 specific program which Kaiser had run in the past.

When Juncos Racing was rebranded as Juncos Hollinger Racing, Kaiser was one of the drivers that Ricardo Juncos and, new team co-owner, Brad Hollinger would consider for their first full-time IndyCar entry, which was due to be entered in the final three rounds of 2021 and from 2022 onward. The team ultimately chose Scuderia Ferrari test driver Callum Ilott for the full-time entry. Juncos however did not rule out bringing Kaiser on for a second car on a part time basis, including for the Indianapolis 500.

== Motorsports career results ==
=== SCCA National Championship Runoffs ===
Year	Track	Car	Engine	Class	Finish	Start	Status
2014	Laguna Seca	Mazda Miata	Mazda	Spec Miata	DSQ	2	Running

=== Pro Mazda Championship ===
Year	Team	1	2	3	4	5	6	7	8	9	10	11	12	13	14	15	16	Rank	Points
2013	World Speed Motorsports	AUS; 8	AUS; 6	STP; 5	STP; 10	IND; 7	IOW; 10	TOR; 5	TOR; 5	MOS; 8	MOS; 6	MOH; 6	MOH; 8	TRO; 10	TRO; 13	HOU; 8	HOU; 8	**7th**	**209**
2014	Juncos Racing	STP; 2	STP; 2	BAR; 3	BAR; 5	IMS; 13	IMS; 5	LOR; 8	HOU; 8	HOU; 15	MOH; 12	MOH; 7	MIL; 10	SON; 1	SON; DSQ			**6th**	**211**

=== Indy Lights ===
Year	Team	1	2	3	4	5	6	7	8	9	10	11	12	13	14	15	16	17	18	Rank	Points
2015	Juncos Racing	STP; 5	STP; 5	LBH; 12	ALA; 8	ALA; 12	IMS; 12	IMS; 6	INDY; 5	TOR; 3	TOR; 9	MIL; 9	IOW; 4	MOH; 4	MOH; 11	LAG; 2	LAG; 10			6th	237
2016	Juncos Racing	**STP**; 3	STP; 2	**PHX**; 1	ALA; 15	ALA; 6	IMS; 6	IMS; 3	INDY; 16	RDA; 6	RDA; 6	IOW; 6	TOR; 3	TOR; 3	MOH; 9	MOH; 6	WGL; 4	**LAG**; 1	LAG; 3	3rd	334
2017	Juncos Racing	STP; 6	STP; 4	**ALA**; 2	ALA; 2	IMS; 3	**IMS**; 1	INDY; 9	RDA; 3	RDA; 2	IOW; 5	**TOR**; 1	TOR; 1	MOH; 12	MOH; 12	GMP; 4	WGL; 7			1st	330

=== IndyCar Series ===
(key)

Year	Team	No.	Chassis	Engine	1	2	3	4	5	6	7	8	9	10	11	12	13	14	15	16	17	Rank	Points	Ref
2018	Juncos Racing	32	Dallara DW12	Chevrolet	STP	PHX; 21	LBH; 16	ALA	IMS; 19	INDY; 29	DET	DET	TXS	ROA	IOW	TOR	MOH	POC	GTW	POR	SNM	30th	45	
2019	Juncos Racing	32	Dallara DW12	Chevrolet	STP	COA; 18	ALA	LBH	IMS	INDY; 31	DET	DET	TXS	RDA	TOR	IOW	MOH	POC	GTW	POR	LAG	32nd	22	

* Season still in progress.

==== Indianapolis 500 ====
Year	Chassis	Engine	Start	Finish	Team
2018	Dallara	Chevrolet	17	29	Juncos Racing
2019	Dallara	Chevrolet	33	31	Juncos Racing

=== Complete WeatherTech SportsCar Championship results ===
(key) (Races in bold indicate pole position; races in italics indicate fastest lap)

Year	Entrant	Class	Make	Engine	1	2	3	4	5	6	7	8	9	10	Rank	Points
2019	Juncos Racing	DPi	Cadillac DPi-V.R	Cadillac 5.5 L V8	DAY; 8	SEB	LBH; 7	MOH; 9	DET	WGL	MOS	ELK	LGA	PET	21st	69

Sporting positions
Preceded by Ed Jones	Indy Lights; Champion; 2017	Succeeded by Patricio O'Ward
