= 2018 GoPro Grand Prix of Sonoma =

(United States) 2018 Sonoma
Race details
17th round of the 2018 IndyCar Series season
Next race →
- Date: September 16, 2018
- Official name: GoPro Grand Prix of Sonoma
- Location: Sonoma Raceway
- Course: Permanent racing facility 2.385 mi / 3.838 km
- Distance: 85 laps 202.725 mi / 326.230 km

Pole position
- Driver: (United States) Ryan Hunter-Reay (Andretti Autosport)
- Time: 1:17.6277

Fastest lap
- Driver: (New Zealand) Scott Dixon (Chip Ganassi Racing)
- Time: 1:19.8646 (on lap 41 of 85)

Podium
- First: (United States) Ryan Hunter-Reay (Andretti Autosport)
- Second: (New Zealand) Scott Dixon (Chip Ganassi Racing)
- Third: (France) Simon Pagenaud (Team Penske)

The 2018 GoPro Grand Prix of Sonoma was the 17th and final round of the 2018 IndyCar Series season. The race was held on September 16 at Sonoma Raceway in Sonoma, California. 2014 Indy 500 winner Ryan Hunter-Reay qualified on pole position, and took victory in the 85-lap race.

This also marked the last IndyCar Series race at Sonoma, as since 2019, the season finale held at the WeatherTech Raceway Laguna Seca.

It was also the final race for Verizon Communications as the series sponsor, as NTT took over as title sponsor for 2019.

== Results ==
Key	Meaning
R	Rookie
W	Past winner

=== Qualifying ===
Pos	No.	Name	Grp.	Round 1	Round 2	Firestone Fast 6
1	28	(United States) Ryan Hunter-Reay	2	1:17.5068	1:17.4470	1:17.6277
2	9	(New Zealand) Scott Dixon W	2	1:17.5943	1:17.5215	1:17.7599
3	1	(United States) Josef Newgarden	2	1:17.6219	1:17.4540	1:17.7937
4	98	(United States) Marco Andretti W	1	1:18.0842	1:17.5813	1:17.7999
5	8	(Mexico) Patricio O'Ward R	2	1:18.1765	1:17.5585	1:17.9737
6	27	(United States) Alexander Rossi	1	1:17.9283	1:17.5711	1:18.0019
7	12	(Australia) Will Power W	1	1:17.9290	1:17.6495	
8	22	(France) Simon Pagenaud W	1	1:17.9197	1:17.7489	
9	15	(United States) Graham Rahal	1	1:18.2625	1:17.9043	
10	26	(United States) Zach Veach R	2	1:18.1307	1:17.9111	
11	18	(France) Sébastien Bourdais	2	1:18.3676	1:17.9242	
12	30	(Japan) Takuma Sato	1	1:18.0023	1:17.9919	
13	19	(Brazil) Pietro Fittipaldi R	1	1:18.5281		
14	10	(United Arab Emirates) Ed Jones	2	1:18.5088		
15	5	(Canada) James Hinchcliffe	1	1:18.5740		
16	60	(United Kingdom) Jack Harvey R	2	1:18.5892		
17	21	(United States) Spencer Pigot	1	1:18.6687		
18	14	(Brazil) Tony Kanaan W	2	1:18.5966		
19	88	(United States) Colton Herta R	1	1:18.6823		
20	39	(United States) Santino Ferrucci R	2	1:18.6172		
21	59	(United Kingdom) Max Chilton	1	1:18.7536		
22	6	(Colombia) Carlos Muñoz	2	1:18.7211		
23	4	(Brazil) Matheus Leist R	1	1:18.9665		
24	23	(United States) Charlie Kimball	2	1:18.8495		
25	20	(United Kingdom) Jordan King R	2	1:19.1519		
OFFICIAL BOX SCORE

=== Race ===
Pos	No.	Driver	Team	Engine	Laps	Time/Retired	Pit Stops	Grid	Laps Led	Pts.^{1}
1	28	(United States) Ryan Hunter-Reay	Andretti Autosport	Honda	85	2:02:19.1667	3	1	80	104
2	9	(New Zealand) Scott Dixon W	Chip Ganassi Racing	Honda	85	+2.7573	3	2		80
3	12	(Australia) Will Power W	Team Penske	Chevrolet	85	+3.6550	3	7	4	71
4	22	(France) Simon Pagenaud W	Team Penske	Chevrolet	85	+4.6306	3	8		64
5	98	(United States) Marco Andretti W	Andretti Herta Autosport with Curb-Agajanian	Honda	85	+19.8030	3	4		60
6	18	(France) Sébastien Bourdais	Dale Coyne Racing with Vasser-Sullivan	Honda	85	+21.6393	3	11		56
7	27	(United States) Alexander Rossi	Andretti Autosport	Honda	85	+28.3778	5	6		52
8	1	(United States) Josef Newgarden	Team Penske	Chevrolet	85	+34.6288	3	3	1	49
9	8	(Mexico) Patricio O'Ward R	Harding Racing	Chevrolet	85	+42.8662	3	5		44
10	10	(United Arab Emirates) Ed Jones	Chip Ganassi Racing	Honda	85	+44.2254	3	14		40
11	39	(United States) Santino Ferrucci R	Dale Coyne Racing	Honda	85	+44.6273	4	20		38
12	14	(Brazil) Tony Kanaan W	A. J. Foyt Enterprises	Chevrolet	85	+1:00.4138	3	18		36
13	20	(United Kingdom) Jordan King R	Ed Carpenter Racing	Chevrolet	85	+1:04.0637	3	25		34
14	26	(United States) Zach Veach R	Andretti Autosport	Honda	85	+1:05.4899	3	10		32
15	5	(Canada) James Hinchcliffe	Schmidt Peterson Motorsports	Honda	85	+1:12.8026	3	15		30
16	19	(Brazil) Pietro Fittipaldi R	Dale Coyne Racing	Honda	85	+1:14.2459	3	13		28
17	60	(United Kingdom) Jack Harvey R	Meyer Shank Racing with Schmidt Peterson	Honda	85	+1:15.6462	3	16		26
18	6	(Colombia) Carlos Muñoz	Schmidt Peterson Motorsports	Honda	85	+1:18.6345	3	22		24
19	4	(Brazil) Matheus Leist R	A. J. Foyt Enterprises	Chevrolet	85	+1:22.3819	4	23		22
20	88	(United States) Colton Herta R	Harding Racing	Chevrolet	85	+1:23.4673	3	19		20
21	59	(United Kingdom) Max Chilton	Carlin	Chevrolet	84	+1 lap	3	21		18
22	23	(United States) Charlie Kimball	Carlin	Chevrolet	76	+9 laps	4	24		16
23	15	(United States) Graham Rahal	Rahal Letterman Lanigan Racing	Honda	66	+19 laps	3	9		14
24	21	(United States) Spencer Pigot	Ed Carpenter Racing	Chevrolet	38	Mechanical	3	17		12
25	30	(Japan) Takuma Sato	Rahal Letterman Lanigan Racing	Honda	15	Mechanical	1	12		10
OFFICIAL BOX SCORE

Notes: ^{1} Points include 1 point for leading at least 1 lap during a race, an additional 2 points for leading the most race laps, and 1 point for Pole Position.

== Championship standings after the race ==
Drivers' Championship standings

	Pos	Driver	Points
	1	(New Zealand) Scott Dixon	678
	2	(United States) Alexander Rossi	621
	3	(Australia) Will Power	582
1	4	(United States) Ryan Hunter-Reay	566
1	5	(United States) Josef Newgarden	560

Manufacturer standings

Pos	Manufacturer	Points
1	(Japan) Honda	1,467
2	(United States) Chevrolet	1,203

- Note: Only the top five positions are included.

Previous race: 2018 Grand Prix of Portland	IndyCar Series; 2018 season	Next race: None
Previous race: 2017 GoPro Grand Prix of Sonoma	Grand Prix of Sonoma	Next race: None
