= Andretti Harding Steinbrenner Autosport =

American auto racing team

- Owner(s): Andretti Autosport; Mike Harding; George Michael Steinbrenner IV
- Principal(s): Brian Barnhart (President)
- Base: Speedway, Indiana
- Series: IndyCar Series
- Opened: 2017
- Closed: 2020

Career
- Debut: 2017 Indianapolis 500
- Latest race: 2020 Grand Prix of St. Petersburg
- Drivers' Championships: 0
- Indy 500 victories: 0
- Race victories: 3
- Pole positions: 3

Harding Racing logo prior to partnership

Andretti Harding Steinbrenner Autosport was an auto racing team that competed in the IndyCar Series. Founded as Harding Racing in 2017 by businessman Mike Harding, the team would form partnerships in 2019 with Steinbrenner Racing and in 2020 with Andretti Autosport, the latter resulting in team equipment and personnel moving into Andretti's race shop. Harding's involvement would end after the 2020 season.

== History ==
The team was founded as Harding Racing in 2017 by Mike Harding, with Gabby Chaves as driver for the Indy 500, Texas and Pocono, moving to full-time in 2018. According to then-Indy Lights driver Santiago Urrutia, the team signed him on a handshake deal to join Chaves at the team in 2018, but the team backflipped on the deal before the season started. In 2019, he would partner with Steinbrenner Racing, led by George Michael Steinbrenner IV, the son of the late New York Yankees co-owner and co-chairman Hank Steinbrenner and a grandson of George Steinbrenner III. Steinbrenner IV had previously run an Indy Lights program with childhood friend Colton Herta as driver, in a partnership with Andretti Autosport. With the addition of Steinbrenner IV came Herta and a technical alliance with Andretti, that would see Andretti Technologies engineers be assigned to the No. 88. A planned second entry was intended for Herta's Lights teammate and rival Pato O'Ward, however due to a lack of funding (despite O'Ward carrying a 3-race scholarship for winning the Lights championship), the No. 8 Honda that O'Ward was slated to drive was never entered, and O'Ward would be released from his contract before the first race of 2019.

Herta would win the second race of 2019, at Circuit of the Americas, but that did little to solve the team's continued budget issues. Herta had a contract with Andretti which superseded his contract with Harding, but with the requirement that Herta have a IndyCar Series race ride. Rather than lose the young driver to the newly formed Arrow McLaren SP, Andretti agreed to a deal that would see the HSR No. 88 entry absorbed into Andretti's shop after the 2019 season, with team equipment and some personnel being moved under the Andretti banner, but not before Herta would win again in the season finale at Laguna Seca.

Larry Curry acted as the team manager and competition director. In November 2017 Brian Barnhart was named the team's president as the team prepared to join the series full time. Barnhart would be credited with securing the partnership with Steinbrenner/Andretti and eventual merger with Andretti amidst the teams budget issues.

At 22-years old, Steinbrenner became the youngest car owner in IndyCar history.

== Racing results ==
=== Complete IndyCar Series results ===
(key)

Year	Chassis	Engine	Drivers	No.	1	2	3	4	5	6	7	8	9	10	11	12	13	14	15	16	17	Pos	Pts
Harding Racing
2017					STP	LBH	ALA	PHX	IMS	INDY	DET	DET	TXS	ROA	IOW	TOR	MDO	POC	GAT	WGL	SNM		
2017	Dallara DW12	Chevrolet IndyCar V6t	(Colombia) Gabby Chaves	88						9			5					15				23rd	98
2018					STP	PHX	LBH	ALA	IMS	INDY	DET		TXS	ROA	IOW	TOR	MDO	POC	GAT	POR	SNM		
2018	Dallara DW12	Chevrolet IndyCar V6t	(Mexico) Patricio O'Ward (R)	8																	9	31st	44
2018	Dallara DW12	Chevrolet IndyCar V6t	(Colombia) Gabby Chaves	88	14	15	19	17	17	14	18	19	15	19	21				18	13		20th	187
2018	Dallara DW12	Chevrolet IndyCar V6t	(United States) Conor Daly	88												13	22	15				29th	58
2018	Dallara DW12	Chevrolet IndyCar V6t	(United States) Colton Herta (R)	88																	20	37th	20
Harding Steinbrenner Racing
2019					STP	COA	ALA	LBH	IMS	INDY	DET		TEX	ROA	TOR	IOW	MDO	POC	GAT	POR	LAG		
2019	Dallara DW12	Honda HI19TT V6t	(United States) Colton Herta (R)	88	8	1	24	23	23	33	12	12	18	8	7	18	8	16	9	4	1*	7th	420
Andretti Harding Steinbrenner Autosport
2020					TEX	IMS	ROA		IOW		INDY	GTW		MDO		IMS		STP					
2020	Dallara DW12	Honda HI20TT V6t	(United States) Colton Herta	88	7	4	5	5	19	19	8	4	6	9	1*	4	2	11				3rd	421

* Season still in progress

== IndyCar wins ==
#	Season	Date	Sanction	Track / Race	No.	Winning driver	Chassis	Engine	Tire	Grid	Laps Led
1	2019	March 24	IndyCar	Circuit of the Americas (R)	88	(United States) Colton Herta (R)	Dallara DW12	Honda HI19TT V6t	Firestone	4	15
2	2019	September 22	IndyCar	WeatherTech Raceway Laguna Seca (R)	88	(United States) Colton Herta (R) (2)	Dallara DW12	Honda HI19TT V6t	Firestone	Pole	83
3	2020	September 13	IndyCar	Mid-Ohio Sports Car Course II (R)	88	(United States) Colton Herta (3)	Dallara DW12	Honda HI20TT V6t	Firestone	Pole	57
