= 2019 Honda Indy 200 =

Indycar race at Mid-Ohio

(United States) 2019 Honda Indy 200 at Mid-Ohio
Race details
13th round of the 2019 IndyCar season
← Previous race	Next race →
- Date: July 28, 2019
- Official name: Honda Indy 200 at Mid-Ohio
- Location: Mid-Ohio Sports Car Course, Lexington, Ohio
- Course: Permanent racing facility 2.258 mi / 3.634 km
- Distance: 90 laps 203.22 mi / 327.05 km

Pole position
- Driver: (Australia) (Australia) Will Power (Team Penske)
- Time: 01:05.1569

Fastest lap
- Driver: (Canada) (Canada) James Hinchcliffe (Arrow Schmidt Peterson Motorsports)
- Time: 01:07.3644 (on lap 79 of 90)

Podium
- First: (New Zealand) (New Zealand) Scott Dixon (Chip Ganassi Racing)
- Second: (Sweden) (Sweden) Felix Rosenqvist (Chip Ganassi Racing)
- Third: (United States) (United States) Ryan Hunter-Reay (Andretti Autosport)

The 2019 Honda Indy 200 at Mid-Ohio was an IndyCar Series event held at Mid-Ohio Sports Car Course in Lexington, Ohio. The race served as the 13th round of the 2019 IndyCar Series season. This marked the 35th time that Indy car racing had raced at Mid-Ohio. The event was supported by races from the three Road to Indy ladder series as well as Stadium Super Trucks and the Global MX-5 Cup. Will Power secured his fourth pole at Mid-Ohio, a record for the track. It was also his 57th overall pole in the IndyCar Series. Scott Dixon beat fellow Chip Ganassi Racing teammate Felix Rosenqvist by a margin of .0934, the closest margin of victory at Mid-Ohio. Points leader Josef Newgarden had a last lap spin which dropped him ten positions from a potential fourth place finish

== Background ==
=== Entrants ===
DragonSpeed was originally planning on entering Ben Hanley but pulled out due to visa issues.

Key	Meaning
R	Rookie
W	Past winner

No.	Driver	Team	Engine
2	(United States) Josef Newgarden W	Team Penske	Chevrolet
4	(Brazil) Matheus Leist	A. J. Foyt Enterprises	Chevrolet
5	(Canada) James Hinchcliffe	Arrow Schmidt Peterson Motorsports	Honda
7	(Sweden) Marcus Ericsson R	Arrow Schmidt Peterson Motorsports	Honda
9	(New Zealand) Scott Dixon W	Chip Ganassi Racing	Honda
10	(Sweden) Felix Rosenqvist R	Chip Ganassi Racing	Honda
12	(Australia) Will Power	Team Penske	Chevrolet
14	(Brazil) Tony Kanaan	A. J. Foyt Enterprises	Chevrolet
15	(United States) Graham Rahal W	Rahal Letterman Lanigan Racing	Honda
18	(France) Sébastien Bourdais	Dale Coyne Racing with Vasser-Sullivan	Honda
19	(United States) Santino Ferrucci R	Dale Coyne Racing	Honda
20	(United Arab Emirates) Ed Jones	Ed Carpenter Racing	Chevrolet
21	(United States) Spencer Pigot	Ed Carpenter Racing	Chevrolet
22	(France) Simon Pagenaud W	Team Penske	Chevrolet
26	(United States) Zach Veach	Andretti Autosport	Honda
27	(United States) Alexander Rossi W	Andretti Autosport	Honda
28	(United States) Ryan Hunter-Reay	Andretti Autosport	Honda
30	(Japan) Takuma Sato	Rahal Letterman Lanigan Racing	Honda
31	(United States) RC Enerson R	Carlin	Chevrolet
59	(United Kingdom) Max Chilton	Carlin	Chevrolet
60	(United Kingdom) Jack Harvey	Meyer Shank Racing	Honda
88	(United States) Colton Herta R	Harding Steinbrenner Racing	Honda
98	(United States) Marco Andretti	Andretti Herta Autosport w/ Marco Andretti & Curb-Agajanian	Honda

== Practice ==
=== Practice 1 ===
Practice 1 took place at 11:20 AM ET on July 26, 2019.

Top Practice Speeds
Pos	No.	Driver	Team	Engine	Lap Time
1	9	(New Zealand) Scott Dixon W	Chip Ganassi Racing	Honda	01:06.0973
2	21	(United States) Spencer Pigot	Ed Carpenter Racing	Chevrolet	01:06.2455
3	22	(France) Simon Pagenaud W	Team Penske	Chevrolet	01:06.2665

=== Practice 2 ===
Practice 2 took place at 3:15 PM ET on July 26, 2019.

Top Practice Speeds
Pos	No.	Driver	Team	Engine	Lap Time
1	88	(United States) Colton Herta R	Harding Steinbrenner Racing	Honda	01:05.7292
2	22	(France) Simon Pagenaud W	Team Penske	Chevrolet	01:05.9313
3	12	(Australia) Will Power	Team Penske	Chevrolet	01:05.9935

=== Practice 3 ===
Practice 3 took place at 10:30 AM ET on July 27, 2019.

Top Practice Speeds
Pos	No.	Driver	Team	Engine	Lap Time
1	88	(United States) Colton Herta R	Harding Steinbrenner Racing	Honda	01:05.7048
2	21	(United States) Spencer Pigot	Ed Carpenter Racing	Chevrolet	01:05.7625
3	27	(United States) Alexander Rossi W	Andretti Autosport	Honda	01:05.8747

== Qualifying ==
Qualifying took place at 2:35 PM ET on July 27, 2019.

=== Qualifying classification ===
Pos	No.	Driver	Team	Engine	Time				Final grid
Pos	No.	Driver	Team	Engine	Round 1		Round 2	Round 3	Final grid
Pos	No.	Driver	Team	Engine	Group 1	Group 2	Round 2	Round 3	Final grid
1	12	(Australia) Will Power	Team Penske	Chevrolet	**01:05.3775**	N/A	01:05.4261	**01:05.1569**	1
2	27	(United States) Alexander Rossi **W**	Andretti Autosport	Honda	N/A	01:05.2810	**01:05.1898**	01:05.5317	2
3	2	(United States) Josef Newgarden **W**	Team Penske	Chevrolet	N/A	01:05.3809	01:05.4004	01:05.7885	3
4	22	(France) Simon Pagenaud **W**	Team Penske	Chevrolet	N/A	01:05.6464	01:05.4207	01:05.8958	4
5	18	(France) Sébastien Bourdais	Dale Coyne Racing with Vasser-Sullivan	Honda	N/A	**01:05.2702**	01:05.5616	01:06.2040	5
6	10	(Sweden) Felix Rosenqvist **R**	Chip Ganassi Racing	Honda	01:05.7631	N/A	01:05.3968	01:06.4914	6
7	88	(United States) Colton Herta **R**	Harding Steinbrenner Racing	Honda	N/A	01:05.4335	01:05.5650	N/A	7
8	9	(New Zealand) Scott Dixon **W**	Chip Ganassi Racing	Honda	N/A	01:05.7294	01:05.6999	N/A	8
9	60	(United Kingdom) Jack Harvey	Meyer Shank Racing	Honda	01:05.9107	N/A	01:05.7231	N/A	9
10	28	(United States) Ryan Hunter-Reay	Andretti Autosport	Honda	01:05.7484	N/A	01:05.7328	N/A	10
11	5	(Canada) James Hinchcliffe	Arrow Schmidt Peterson Motorsports	Honda	01:05.9152	N/A	01:05.7567	N/A	11
12	7	(Sweden) Marcus Ericsson **R**	Arrow Schmidt Peterson Motorsports	Honda	01:05.7286	N/A	01:06.0428	N/A	12
13	21	(United States) Spencer Pigot	Ed Carpenter Racing	Chevrolet	01:05.9377	N/A	N/A	N/A	13
14	19	(United States) Santino Ferrucci **R**	Dale Coyne Racing	Honda	N/A	01:05.7588	N/A	N/A	14
15	15	(United States) Graham Rahal **W**	Rahal Letterman Lanigan Racing	Honda	01:05.9745	N/A	N/A	N/A	15
16	59	(United Kingdom) Max Chilton	Carlin	Chevrolet	N/A	01:05.9981	N/A	N/A	16
17	30	(Japan) Takuma Sato	Rahal Letterman Lanigan Racing	Honda	01:06.3723	N/A	N/A	N/A	17
18	20	(United Arab Emirates) Ed Jones	Ed Carpenter Racing	Chevrolet	N/A	01:06.1800	N/A	N/A	18
19	98	(United States) Marco Andretti	Andretti Herta Autosport w/ Marco Andretti & Curb-Agajanian	Honda	01:06.4156	N/A	N/A	N/A	19
20	26	(United States) Zach Veach	Andretti Autosport	Honda	N/A	01:06.2115	N/A	N/A	20
21	4	(Brazil) Matheus Leist	A. J. Foyt Enterprises	Chevrolet	01:06.5488	N/A	N/A	N/A	21
22	31	(United States) RC Enerson **R**	Carlin	Chevrolet	N/A	01:06.3196	N/A	N/A	22
23	14	(Brazil) Tony Kanaan	A. J. Foyt Enterprises	Chevrolet	N/A	01:07.0491	N/A	N/A	23

Notes

- **Bold text** indicates fastest time set in session.

== Warm Up ==
=== Final Practice ===
A Warm Up practice took place at 12:00 PM ET on July 28, 2019.

Top Practice Speeds
Pos	No.	Driver	Team	Engine	Lap Time
1	2	(United States) Josef Newgarden W	Team Penske	Chevrolet	01:06.6442
2	10	(Sweden) Felix Rosenqvist R	Chip Ganassi Racing	Honda	01:06.9027
3	88	(United States) Colton Herta R	Harding Steinbrenner Racing	Honda	01:06.9386

== Race ==
The race started at 4:00 PM ET on July 28, 2019.

=== Race classification ===
Pos	No.	Driver	Team	Engine	Laps	Time/Retired	Pit Stops	Grid	Laps Led	Pts.
1	9	(New Zealand) Scott Dixon W	Chip Ganassi Racing	Honda	90	1:45:15.6974	2	8	38	53
2	10	(Sweden) Felix Rosenqvist R	Chip Ganassi Racing	Honda	90	+0.0934	3	6	15	41
3	28	(United States) Ryan Hunter-Reay	Andretti Autosport	Honda	90	+1.2578	3	10		35
4	12	(Australia) Will Power	Team Penske	Chevrolet	90	+6.9878	2	1	26	34
5	27	(United States) Alexander Rossi W	Andretti Autosport	Honda	90	+10.7949	2	2		30
6	22	(France) Simon Pagenaud W	Team Penske	Chevrolet	90	+11.9029	3	4		28
7	21	(United States) Spencer Pigot	Ed Carpenter Racing	Chevrolet	90	+12.3671	3	13		26
8	88	(United States) Colton Herta R	Harding Steinbrenner Racing	Honda	90	+12.9546	3	7		24
9	15	(United States) Graham Rahal W	Rahal Letterman Lanigan Racing	Honda	90	+19.9289	3	15		22
10	60	(United Kingdom) Jack Harvey	Meyer Shank Racing	Honda	90	+20.4762	3	9		20
11	18	(France) Sébastien Bourdais	Dale Coyne Racing with Vasser-Sullivan	Honda	90	+20.7715	4	5		19
12	19	(United States) Santino Ferrucci R	Dale Coyne Racing	Honda	90	+21.2696	3	14		18
13	20	(United Arab Emirates) Ed Jones	Ed Carpenter Racing	Chevrolet	90	+46.0085	3	18		17
14	2	(United States) Josef Newgarden W	Team Penske	Chevrolet	89	Off Course	3	3	11	17
15	98	(United States) Marco Andretti	Andretti Herta Autosport w/ Marco Andretti & Curb-Agajanian	Honda	89	+1 Lap	3	19		15
16	59	(United Kingdom) Max Chilton	Carlin	Chevrolet	89	+1 Lap	3	16		14
17	31	(United States) RC Enerson R	Carlin	Chevrolet	89	+1 Lap	3	22		13
18	4	(Brazil) Matheus Leist	A. J. Foyt Enterprises	Chevrolet	89	+1 Lap	3	21		12
19	30	(Japan) Takuma Sato	Rahal Letterman Lanigan Racing	Honda	89	+1 Lap	4	17		11
20	14	(Brazil) Tony Kanaan	A. J. Foyt Enterprises	Chevrolet	89	+1 Lap	3	23		10
21	26	(United States) Zach Veach	Andretti Autosport	Honda	89	+1 Lap	3	20		9
22	5	(Canada) James Hinchcliffe	Arrow Schmidt Peterson Motorsports	Honda	87	+3 Laps	5	11		8
23	7	(Sweden) Marcus Ericsson R	Arrow Schmidt Peterson Motorsports	Honda	2	Contact	1	12		7
Fastest lap: (Canada) James Hinchcliffe (Arrow Schmidt Peterson Motorsports) – 01:07.3644 (lap 79)

== Championship standings after the race ==
Drivers' Championship standings

Pos	Driver	Points
1	(United States) Josef Newgarden	504
2	(United States) Alexander Rossi	488
3	(France) Simon Pagenaud	457
4	(New Zealand) Scott Dixon	442
5	(Australia) Will Power	356

- Note: Only the top five positions are included.

Previous race: 2019 Iowa 300	IndyCar Series; 2019 season	Next race: 2019 ABC Supply 500
Previous race: 2018 Honda Indy 200	Indy 200 at Mid-Ohio	Next race: 2020 Honda Indy 200
