= 2019 ABC Supply 500 =

(United States) 2019 ABC Supply 500
Race details
14th round of the 2019 IndyCar Series season
← Previous race	Next race →
- Date: August 18, 2019
- Official name: ABC Supply 500
- Location: Pocono Raceway
- Course: Permanent racing facility 2.5 mi / 4.0 km
- Distance: 200 laps 500.00 mi / 804.67 km

Pole position
- Driver: (United States) Josef Newgarden (Team Penske)
- Time: No Time (Note: Qualifying for the ABC Supply 500 was canceled due to weather and starting grid was set by entrant points, so Josef Newgarden was gifted the pole position. Because of this, he was not awarded the bonus point typically awarded for qualifying on pole position.)

Fastest lap
- Driver: (Australia) Will Power (Team Penske)
- Time: 41.7287 (on lap 113 of 128)

Podium
- First: (Australia) Will Power (Team Penske)
- Second: (New Zealand) Scott Dixon (Chip Ganassi Racing)
- Third: (France) Simon Pagenaud (Team Penske)

The 2019 ABC Supply 500 was the 14th round of the 2019 IndyCar Series season. The race was held on August 18 at Pocono Raceway in Long Pond, Pennsylvania. Approaching rain and lightning caused the race to be shortened to only 128 of the scheduled 200 laps allowing Will Power to capture victory. It was Power's third Pocono 500 win, tying him with Rick Mears for second most all-time. As of 2025, this was the last time that IndyCar has visited Pocono.

== Background ==
=== Entrants ===
Key	Meaning
R	Rookie
W	Past winner

No.	Driver	Team	Engine
2	(United States) Josef Newgarden	Team Penske	Chevrolet
4	(Brazil) Matheus Leist	A. J. Foyt Enterprises	Chevrolet
5	(Canada) James Hinchcliffe	Arrow Schmidt Peterson Motorsports	Honda
7	(Sweden) Marcus Ericsson R	Arrow Schmidt Peterson Motorsports	Honda
9	(New Zealand) Scott Dixon W	Chip Ganassi Racing	Honda
10	(Sweden) Felix Rosenqvist R	Chip Ganassi Racing	Honda
12	(Australia) Will Power W	Team Penske	Chevrolet
14	(Brazil) Tony Kanaan	A. J. Foyt Enterprises	Chevrolet
15	(United States) Graham Rahal	Rahal Letterman Lanigan Racing	Honda
18	(France) Sébastien Bourdais	Dale Coyne Racing with Vasser-Sullivan	Honda
19	(United States) Santino Ferrucci R	Dale Coyne Racing	Honda
20	(United States) Ed Carpenter	Ed Carpenter Racing	Chevrolet
21	(United States) Spencer Pigot	Ed Carpenter Racing	Chevrolet
22	(France) Simon Pagenaud	Team Penske	Chevrolet
23	(United States) Charlie Kimball	Carlin	Chevrolet
26	(United States) Zach Veach	Andretti Autosport	Honda
27	(United States) Alexander Rossi W	Andretti Autosport	Honda
28	(United States) Ryan Hunter-Reay W	Andretti Autosport	Honda
30	(Japan) Takuma Sato	Rahal Letterman Lanigan Racing	Honda
59	(United States) Conor Daly	Carlin	Chevrolet
88	(United States) Colton Herta R	Harding Steinbrenner Racing	Honda
98	(United States) Marco Andretti	Andretti Herta Autosport w/ Marco Andretti & Curb-Agajanian	Honda

== Pre-Race Activities ==
=== Practice ===
Practice was scheduled for 9:30 AM ET on August 17, 2019. Practice was cancelled due to weather in the area that would have prevented the medical helicopter from being able to take off.

=== Qualifying ===
No qualifying session took place for the race, as officials were forced to cancel the session due to rain. As a result, qualifying results and the starting lineup for the race were determined based on the driver standings after the previous race, the Honda Indy 200. As the points leader, Josef Newgarden was awarded pole position.

=== Qualifying classification ===
Pos	No.	Driver	Team	Engine					
Pos	No.	Driver	Team	Engine	1	2	(United States) Josef Newgarden	Team Penske	Chevrolet
Pos	No.	Driver	Team	Engine	2	27	(United States) Alexander Rossi W	Andretti Autosport	Honda
3	22	(France) Simon Pagenaud	Team Penske	Chevrolet					
4	9	(New Zealand) Scott Dixon W	Chip Ganassi Racing	Honda					
5	12	(Australia) Will Power W	Team Penske	Chevrolet					
6	28	(United States) Ryan Hunter-Reay W	Andretti Autosport	Honda					
7	30	(Japan) Takuma Sato	Rahal Letterman Lanigan Racing	Honda					
8	15	(United States) Graham Rahal	Rahal Letterman Lanigan Racing	Honda					
9	10	(Sweden) Felix Rosenqvist R	Chip Ganassi Racing	Honda					
10	5	(Canada) James Hinchcliffe	Arrow Schmidt Peterson Motorsports	Honda					
11	18	(France) Sébastien Bourdais	Dale Coyne Racing with Vasser-Sullivan	Honda					
12	21	(United States) Spencer Pigot	Ed Carpenter Racing	Chevrolet					
13	19	(United States) Santino Ferrucci R	Dale Coyne Racing	Honda					
14	88	(United States) Colton Herta R	Harding Steinbrenner Racing	Honda					
15	20	(United States) Ed Carpenter	Ed Carpenter Racing	Chevrolet					
16	7	(Sweden) Marcus Ericsson R	Arrow Schmidt Peterson Motorsports	Honda					
17	98	(United States) Marco Andretti	Andretti Herta Autosport w/ Marco Andretti & Curb-Agajanian	Honda					
18	26	(United States) Zach Veach	Andretti Autosport	Honda					
19	14	(Brazil) Tony Kanaan	A. J. Foyt Enterprises	Chevrolet					
20	4	(Brazil) Matheus Leist	A. J. Foyt Enterprises	Chevrolet					
21	23	(United States) Charlie Kimball	Carlin	Chevrolet					
22	59	(United States) Conor Daly	Carlin	Chevrolet					

=== Final Practice ===
The only practice session took place at 1:50 PM ET on August 17, 2019.

Top Practice Speeds
Pos	No.	Driver	Team	Engine	Lap Time
1	14	(Brazil) Tony Kanaan	A. J. Foyt Enterprises	Chevrolet	00:41.5984
2	9	(New Zealand) Scott Dixon W	Chip Ganassi Racing	Honda	00:41.7128
3	19	(United States) Santino Ferrucci R	Dale Coyne Racing	Honda	00:41.7872

== Race ==
The race started at 2:30 PM ET on August 18, 2019.

The field came off Turn Three for the start slow and tightly bunched. Unlike during the previous year, no accident occurred before the field reached the starting line, however, some cars were five abreast upon receiving the green flag. Simon Pagenaud moved to the inside of Josef Newgarden to take the lead, as the field made their way safely through Turn One.

Heading down the Long Pond Straight into Turn Two, Takuma Sato moved to the outside, while Ryan Hunter-Reay to the inside, alongside of Alexander Rossi for the fifth position. The three cars collided and spun into the inside wall, glancing off and sliding up the track, collecting Felix Rosenqvist and James Hinchcliffe.

After impacting Sato, Rosenqvist's car turned on its right side and spun across the racing surface. As Rosenqvist hit the wall his car rose upwards, his left-front wheel snagging the catch-fence, tearing off the wheel and damaging the fence before his car landed back on the racing surface. Sato's car was pinned against the wall by Hunter-Reay, the force of which turned Sato's car upside-down and landed in an inverted state. All drivers walked away from the accident. Rosenqvist was transported by ambulance to a local hospital for further evaluation but was released after just a few hours. Later that night, Rosenqvist said he felt "just a little back pain and a headache".

Sato was heavily criticized by drivers involved in the crash who thought he was at fault. Defending Pocono 500 champion, Alexander Rossi told NBCSN, "I can't even begin to understand after last year how Takuma thinks any sort of driving like that is acceptable. To turn across two cars at that speed at that corner, in a 500-mile race, is disgraceful and upsetting."

Ryan Hunter-Reay said, "My view is that it was ridiculous. I thank God everyone is alright. I thought we learned our lesson from last year. Lap one of a 500-mile race."

While some said the crash was caused by Sato coming across the track, his Rahal Letterman Lanigan Racing team issued a statement with video and telemetry data defending their driver. "The data and video clearly shows that Takuma did not turn down the track into Alexander in this incident and in fact the first steering wheel movement made by Takuma was to the right, as he tried to correct his car after the initial contact."

Journalist and author John Oreovicz, after viewing the footage, said it "clearly showed that [Sato] held his line and did not steer into or instigate his car's sudden movement to the left." Oreovicz criticized as "disgraceful and upsetting" what he viewed as a "Twitter witch hunt" focused on Sato.

The race was stopped for 45 minutes to repair the catchfence. The teams of Alexander Rossi and James Hinchcliffe continued to repair their cars under the red flag, against rules, for which they were penalized 10 laps.

When the race restarted on lap 8, Simon Pagenaud extended his lead over Scott Dixon. Dixon remained within two seconds of the lead until Pagenaud pitted under green for fuel and tires on lap 38.

On lap 40, Spencer Pigot hit the turn one wall with the right side of his car when a suspension piece broke. Will Power chose to pit later than the leaders and entered pit road as the caution flag came out. The timing allowed Power to make his stop as cars were slowing down which cycled him from 10th before stops to 2nd after them.

Shortly after the restart, Power passed Pagenaud for the lead entering turn one on lap 48. Pagenaud retook the lead three laps later. On lap 70, Pagenaud was slowed by the damaged car of James Hinchcliffe in turn three which allowed Power to take the lead. Pagenaud pitted under green a lap later.

On lap 73, Colton Herta lost control of his car in turn two. The car slid and impacted the outside wall with the right-rear suspension, which put the rookie out of the race. While some contenders pitted before the caution came out, Power pitted under caution, strategy that dropped him to seventh in the running order. Scott Dixon cycled to the lead.

Dixon continued to lead for the next 28 laps until he made his next pit stop on lap 106. By pitting later, Power was able to remain on track for several more laps. Power made a pit stop on lap 112, giving the lead back to Dixon. Power's fast pit stop put him in striking distance of Dixon, and three laps later, he passed Dixon to retake the lead.

Power continued to lead for the next 14 laps until the race was stopped after 128 laps with lightning in the nearby area. Heavy rains followed and the race was called official with Will Power winning his third Pocono 500 in four years.

It was Power's first win of 2019 and extended his streak of consecutive seasons with at least one victory to 13.

=== Race classification ===
Pos	No.	Driver	Team	Engine	Laps	Time/Retired (Note: Race ended under caution)	Pit Stops	Grid	Laps Led	Pts.
1	12	(Australia) Will Power W	Team Penske	Chevrolet	128	1:53:45.8296	5	5	31	51
2	9	(New Zealand) Scott Dixon W	Chip Ganassi Racing	Honda	128	+5.4688	4	4	32	41
3	22	(France) Simon Pagenaud	Team Penske	Chevrolet	128	+7.0950	4	3	64	38
4	19	(United States) Santino Ferrucci R	Dale Coyne Racing	Honda	128	+9.4697	4	13		32
5	2	(United States) Josef Newgarden	Team Penske	Chevrolet	128	+10.1771	4	1	1	31
6	20	(United States) Ed Carpenter	Ed Carpenter Racing	Chevrolet	128	+15.4239	4	15		28
7	18	(France) Sébastien Bourdais	Dale Coyne Racing with Vasser-Sullivan	Honda	128	+19.1641	4	11		26
8	14	(Brazil) Tony Kanaan	A. J. Foyt Enterprises	Chevrolet	128	+23.3941	5	19		24
9	15	(United States) Graham Rahal W	Rahal Letterman Lanigan Racing	Honda	128	+25.2060	5	8		22
10	23	(United States) Charlie Kimball	Carlin	Chevrolet	128	+27.4361	5	21		20
11	59	(United States) Conor Daly	Carlin	Chevrolet	128	+29.2835	5	22		19
12	7	(Sweden) Marcus Ericsson R	Arrow Schmidt Peterson Motorsports	Honda	128	+32.6051	5	16		18
13	26	(United States) Zach Veach	Andretti Autosport	Honda	127	+1 Lap	5	18		17
14	4	(Brazil) Matheus Leist	A. J. Foyt Enterprises	Chevrolet	127	+1 Lap	7	20		16
15	98	(United States) Marco Andretti	Andretti Herta Autosport w/ Marco Andretti & Curb-Agajanian	Honda	126	+2 Laps	6	17		15
16	88	(United States) Colton Herta R	Harding Steinbrenner Racing	Honda	72	Contact	3	14		14
17	21	(United States) Spencer Pigot	Ed Carpenter Racing	Chevrolet	39	Contact	2	12		13
18	27	(United States) Alexander Rossi W	Andretti Autosport	Honda	39	+89 Laps	1	2		12
19	28	(United States) Ryan Hunter-Reay W	Andretti Autosport	Honda	25	Contact	4	6		11
20	5	(Canada) James Hinchcliffe	Arrow Schmidt Peterson Motorsports	Honda	19	Contact	3	10		10
21	30	(Japan) Takuma Sato	Rahal Letterman Lanigan Racing	Honda	0	Contact	0	7		9
22	10	(Sweden) Felix Rosenqvist R	Chip Ganassi Racing	Honda	0	Contact	0	9		8
Fastest lap: (Australia) Will Power (Team Penske) – 00:41.7287 (lap 113)

== Aftermath ==
As Pocono was in the last year of their contract with IndyCar, there were doubts over whether the event would continue in 2020. Those concerns were compounded by 2019 being the final year of the race's title sponsorship with ABC Supply.

Race winner Will Power passionately wished Pocono would remain on the schedule. "I really hope it’s not the last Pocono race for IndyCar. I really, really hope it’s not the last one. I really hope we come back. Obviously, it’s something pretty cool that Roger Penske won the first and last race here at Pocono. Even if we took a year off, I can’t see us not racing at Pocono.” Fellow drivers Tony Kanaan, Alexander Rossi, and Graham Rahal also voiced support for a return.

It was reported that Pocono CEO Brandon Igdalsky and track president Ben May enthusiastically wanted the track to remain on the IndyCar schedule. Pocono saw an increase in spectators and sponsorship in 2019. Should the series not return in 2020, it was reported that Pocono offered to host an IndyCar race once every three years. This would serve as part of a rotation of three east-coast tracks, with Pocono, Richmond, and Watkins Glen each hosting a race once every three years.

Driver opinions were mixed. During the red flag during the race, Robert Wickens tweeted, "How many times do we have to go through the same situation before we can all accept that an IndyCar should not race at Pocono. It’s just a toxic relationship and maybe it’s time to consider a divorce. I’m very relieved (to my knowledge) that everyone is okay from that scary crash."

Sage Karam tweeted, "I don’t want people to think that I dislike Pocono. I think it’s a great track it’s just not meant for indycars. We need to be smart and move on and go to tracks that fit these cars. I love oval racing and want it in Indycar I just simply don’t love Indycar at Pocono."

In their press conference immediately after the 2019 race, series champions Scott Dixon, Will Power, and Simon Pagenaud defended the track's safety and expressed their desire that IndyCar would return.

"Honestly, I feel bad for Pocono,” Dixon said. “The group of people here that work, they work extremely hard. I felt the crowd today at the start of the race was fantastic. It was gaining some really good momentum. Hopefully it does continue." "But down to weather, some mistakes that have happened on track... honestly they could happen anywhere. If you look at Justin [Wilson, who was killed by flying debris at Pocono in 2015] or Robbie [Wickens], those can happen anywhere. I feel bad that it gets a bit of a bad taste in that scenario. I think the drivers in a lot of situations can do a better job to help that situation. Honestly, I hope we come back."

Will Power agreed. "It's a great oval for us. Obviously some unfortunate accidents here, but like Scott said, they could happen anywhere. Kind of got a bad rap for that. The crowd is up 15 percent every year we come back. It's getting better. Like Scott said, the crowd was great today. It's a good racetrack, man, a good track for racing. I really hope we come back. I think the guys do a great job. It’s a cool track for us... It's hard for us to find good ovals these days that suit our cars."

On September 1, 2019, the 2020 IndyCar Series schedule was released and it was confirmed the Pocono 500 would not continue in 2020. Richmond Raceway was added to the schedule, while the event at Mid-Ohio Sports Car Course would take Pocono's date of August 16 on the schedule.

Mario Andretti admitted he was "livid" that Pocono was left off the 2020 schedule. “There’s some blame to go around, to IndyCar and Pocono,” Andretti said. “I don’t think (the track was) doing enough promotion.”

With Pocono reducing to one NASCAR weekend in 2020, Andretti said more value should have been placed on the IndyCar race weekend. “That would’ve been a big, big opportunity to get up and promote the Indy event with more vigor. I think it would’ve paid off. To go away and be out of sight, out of mind, was a terrible mistake on both parts. I don’t think either side worked hard enough to make it happen. I was talking to both sides.”

Andretti said that team-owners Roger Penske, Chip Ganassi, and Michael Andretti supported the event continuing but alleged the series already made up its mind not to return.

"There's two sides to every story," Andretti said, "but the way I understand it, they came to an agreement on the business side of the race, sanctioning fee and all that. Then at the last second - and this is the part that disturbs me because it shows they had already made up their mind and had no intention of coming back - they said now we need to have Pocono basically spend $1 million in improvements before next year. Obviously, they could not absorb that for just a one-year contract. That's the part to me that shows they negotiated in bad faith. They should have even told me, 'You know what Mario, we're not going back at least for next year,' instead of dragging it along and making us believe there still was a chance."

On November 3, 2019, Roger Penske purchased the Indianapolis Motor Speedway and the IndyCar Series itself. Andretti believed that if Penske had owned the series a few months earlier, IndyCar would have never left Pocono. “If Roger Penske was in charge of the series (at the time), this would’ve never happened,” Andretti said. “We would’ve never been out of Pocono.” Furthermore, any attempts to reinstate the race once Penske's ownership began were complicated by NBC's broadcast of the 2020 Olympics which rearranged their sports programming. "The problem was that for next year, the schedule was pretty much set,” Andretti said. “The problem was the TV (coverage), because of the Olympics. They couldn’t reinstate (the race) because of TV. That was a big part of it.”

Andretti insisted he would continue to advocate for a return to Pocono. “I am on it. I am not letting it go.”

== Broadcasting ==
Saturday's two-hour practice session and the race itself were broadcast by NBCSN. The broadcasters were Leigh Diffey, Paul Tracy, and Townsend Bell. Pit reporters were Robin Miller, Kevin Lee, and Dillon Welch.

In the United States, the race got a 0.36 TV rating and 549,000 viewers. It was the most-watched IndyCar race on NBCSN in 2019.

== Championship standings after the race ==
Drivers' Championship standings

Pos	Driver	Points
1	(United States) Josef Newgarden	535
2	(United States) Alexander Rossi	500
3	(France) Simon Pagenaud	495
4	(New Zealand) Scott Dixon	483
5	(Australia) Will Power	407

- Note: Only the top five positions are included.

Previous race: 2019 Honda Indy 200	IndyCar Series; 2019 season	Next race: 2019 Bommarito Automotive Group 500
Previous race: 2018 ABC Supply 500	ABC Supply 500	Next race: None
