= Josef Newgarden =

American racing driver (born 1990)

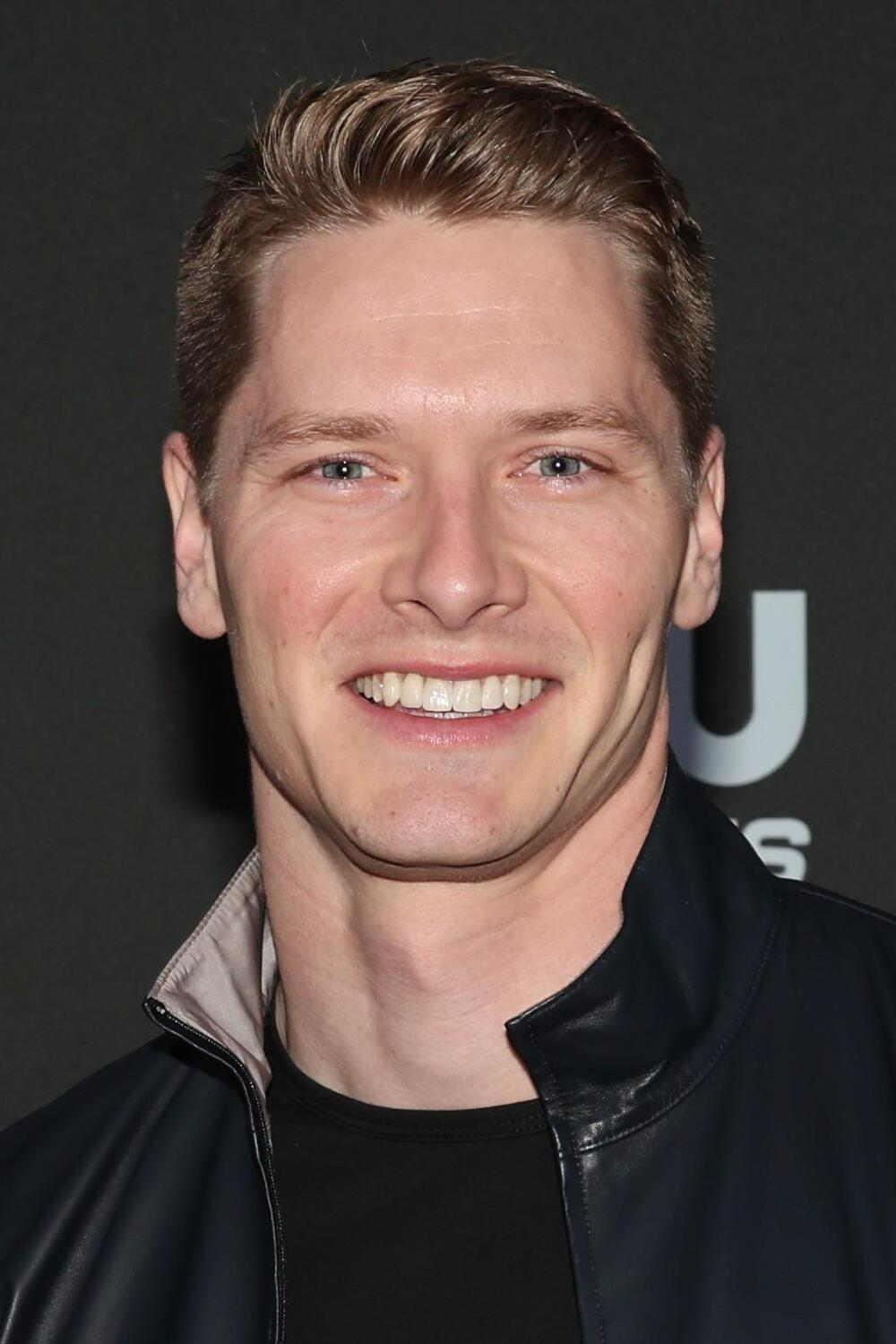
- Newgarden in 2023
- Nationality: (United States) American
- Born: Josef Nicolai Newgarden; December 22, 1990 (age 35) Nashville, Tennessee, U.S.
- Categorisation: FIA Platinum

IndyCar Series career
- 244 races run over 15 years
- Team: No. 2 (Team Penske)
- Best finish: 1st (2017, 2019)
- First race: 2012 Grand Prix of St. Petersburg (St. Petersburg)
- Last race: 2026 Mission Grand Prix of Monterey (Laguna Seca)
- First win: 2015 Honda Indy Grand Prix of Alabama (Barber)
- Last win: 2026 Bommarito Automotive Group 500 (Gateway)
Wins	Podiums	Poles
34	64	19

Previous series
- 2006–07 2007–08 2009 2009 2010 2011: Skip Barber Southern Regional; Skip Barber National; Formula Palmer Audi; British Formula Ford; GP3 Series; Indy Lights

Championship titles
- Indy Lights (2011); IndyCar Series (2017, 2019): Major victories; Indianapolis 500 (2023—2024); Daytona 24 hr (2024)

Josef Nicolai Newgarden (born December 22, 1990) is an American racing driver who races the No. 2 Team Penske Dallara/Chevrolet in the IndyCar Series. He was the 2011 Indy Lights champion, and the 2017 and 2019 IndyCar Series Champion. He won the 2023 and 2024 Indianapolis 500, and the 2024 24 Hours of Daytona, becoming the 16th driver to win both an Indy 500 and a 24 Hours of Daytona, as well as the first driver since Hélio Castroneves to win the Indianapolis 500 two years in a row.

Newgarden began racing at the age of thirteen in karts, capturing four championship titles in 2005–2006. He switched to open-wheel racing in 2006, competing in the Skip Barber Racing School Series, finishing second in the regional championship in 2006, followed by sixth and second in the national series in 2007 and 2008. In 2008, he became the first U.S. driver to capture a Formula Ford Festival title while driving for Team USA in England.

In 2009, Newgarden moved to England to begin his European career. He competed in the British Formula Ford Championship, finishing runner-up and leading the ultra-competitive series with nine race wins. He competed in the opening round of the 2009 Formula Palmer Audi Season, taking two wins. In 2010, he competed in the GP3 Series, capturing one pole position.

Newgarden returned to the United States in 2011 and competed in the Indy Lights Series, capturing five wins and ten podiums out of fourteen races. He clinched the points championship with one race remaining. In 2012, Newgarden joined the IndyCar Series, earning his first career win in 2015 at Barber Motorsports Park followed by a win at Toronto. In 2016, Newgarden captured his third win at Iowa, where he led 282 of 300 laps and set a series record for most laps led in a race.

Newgarden joined Team Penske in 2017, scoring his first win with the team in his third start. He earned four wins and nine podiums in 2017, capturing his first IndyCar Series Championship the same year, and saw a fifth-place finish in the standings with three wins in 2018. Newgarden earned his second Championship in 2019 with four wins and seven podium finishes. During the 2020, 2021, and 2022 seasons, he produced four, two, and five wins respectively, finishing second each year. Newgarden won the inaugural PeopleReady Force for Good Challenge in 2022 by winning on an oval, road, and street course.

In 2023, Newgarden swept the Iowa Speedway weekend and nearly became the first driver to win every oval race on the schedule with wins at Texas and Indianapolis. After a last-lap pass, Newgarden won the 2023 Indianapolis 500 in his twelfth attempt. He finished fifth in the standings in 2023, his eighth consecutive season finishing in the top-five in the championship standings. Newgarden won the 2024 Indianapolis 500, becoming the first driver in over twenty years to win the Indianapolis 500 back-to-back.

== Early career ==
=== Karting ===
According to an interview on The Dale Jr. Download, Newgarden's first race vehicle was a motorized scooter purchased at a skate shop in Hendersonville, Tennessee. In 2001, Newgarden competed in events across the country. After a year of this, his father purchased a kart.

When he was 13, Newgarden and his family ventured outside of Tennessee to find a competitive kart racing environment. This led Newgarden to a kart racing facility in New Castle, Indiana, that had been recently launched by IndyCar driver Mark Dismore. In order to be efficient with his funding, Newgarden focused on local and regional championships rather than competing nationally.

In his first year of karting (2005), Newgarden finished second and third in the Kart Racers of America (KRA) Junior Can Championship. He also competed in the TAG world championships that year in the junior division, securing the title.

The year 2006 proved to be Newgarden's most successful year in karting; he secured two championships in the KRA Junior Can division and repeated as the TAG World Champion in the junior division.

Newgarden then went on to compete in junior car racing in 2007, but returned to karting multiple times over the next few years so he could race in the highly competitive Robo-Pong 200 at New Castle Motorsports Park. He also won the 200-mile endurance race twice, with both successes coming with members of the Dismore family as his teammates (Mark Dismore Sr in 2011 and Mark Dismore Jr in 2013).

=== Early formula car racing ===
==== Skip Barber ====
Newgarden started his open-wheel car career in the Skip Barber Racing School series in 2006. In his first year in the series, he finished runner-up in the Southern Regional Series with three wins and another seven podium finishes. He next competed in the 2007 BFGoodrich / Skip Barber National Presented by Mazda championship, finishing sixth with two wins. Newgarden remained in the series for 2008 and improved to second place, with three wins.

==== Formula Ford ====
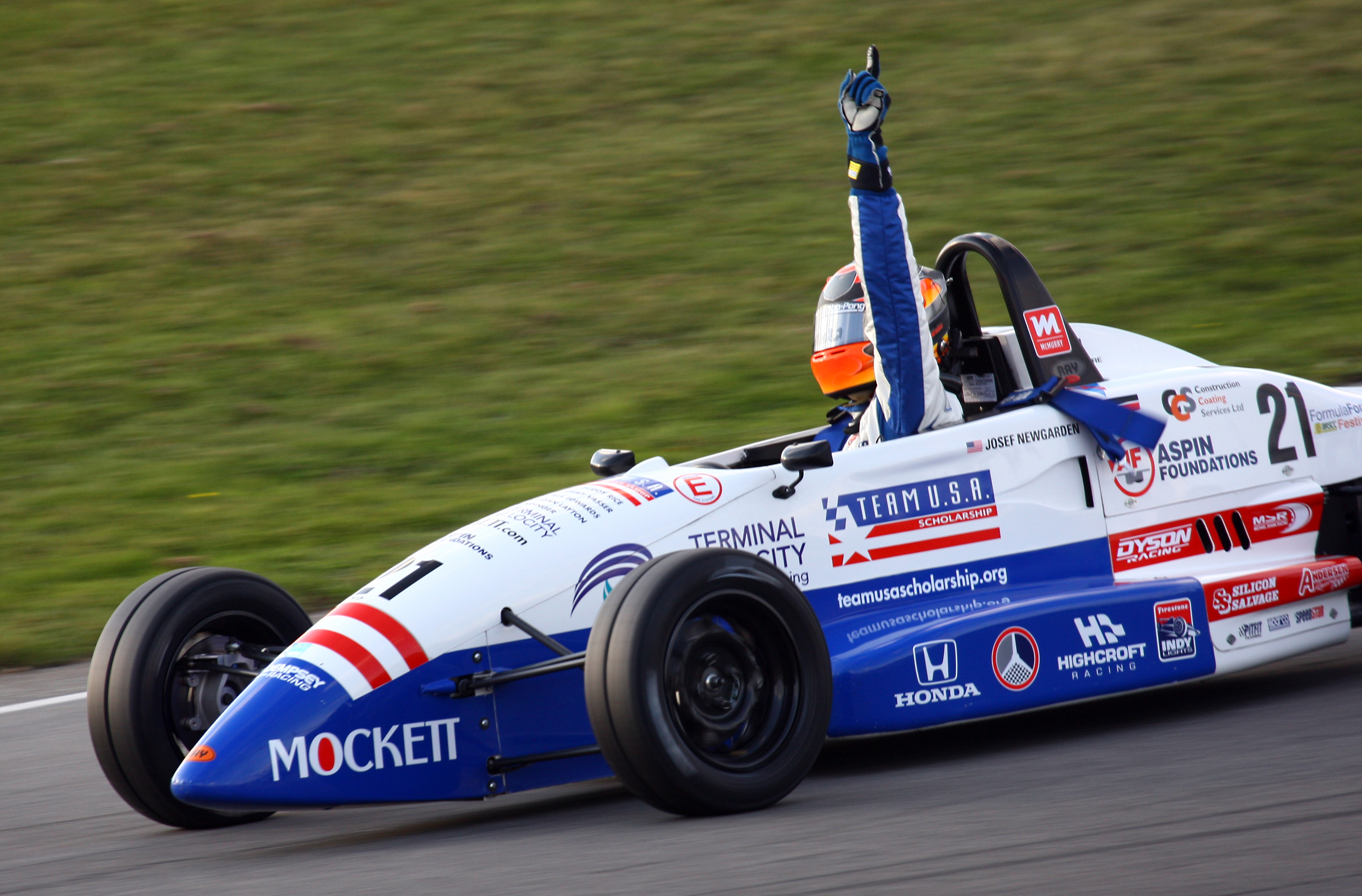
Newgarden after winning the 2008 Formula Ford Festival

After the 2008 season, Newgarden was selected for the Team USA scholarship to compete at the Formula Ford Festival and Walter Hayes Trophy. He secured the Formula Ford Festival title, becoming the only American to do so.

At the Walter Hayes Trophy event, Newgarden won all of the qualifying races leading to the main event. He started the event from the pole position, but mid-way through the race wet conditions settled in and Newgarden crashed and finishing in sixth place.

In 2009, Newgarden moved to England to compete in the British Formula Ford Championship and start his European career. He finished runner-up in 2009, leading the series in total race wins and amassing 550 points.

==== Formula Palmer Audi ====
Newgarden competed in the opening round of the 2009 Formula Palmer Audi season at Brands Hatch, taking two wins and a fourth in the third race.

==== GP3 Series ====
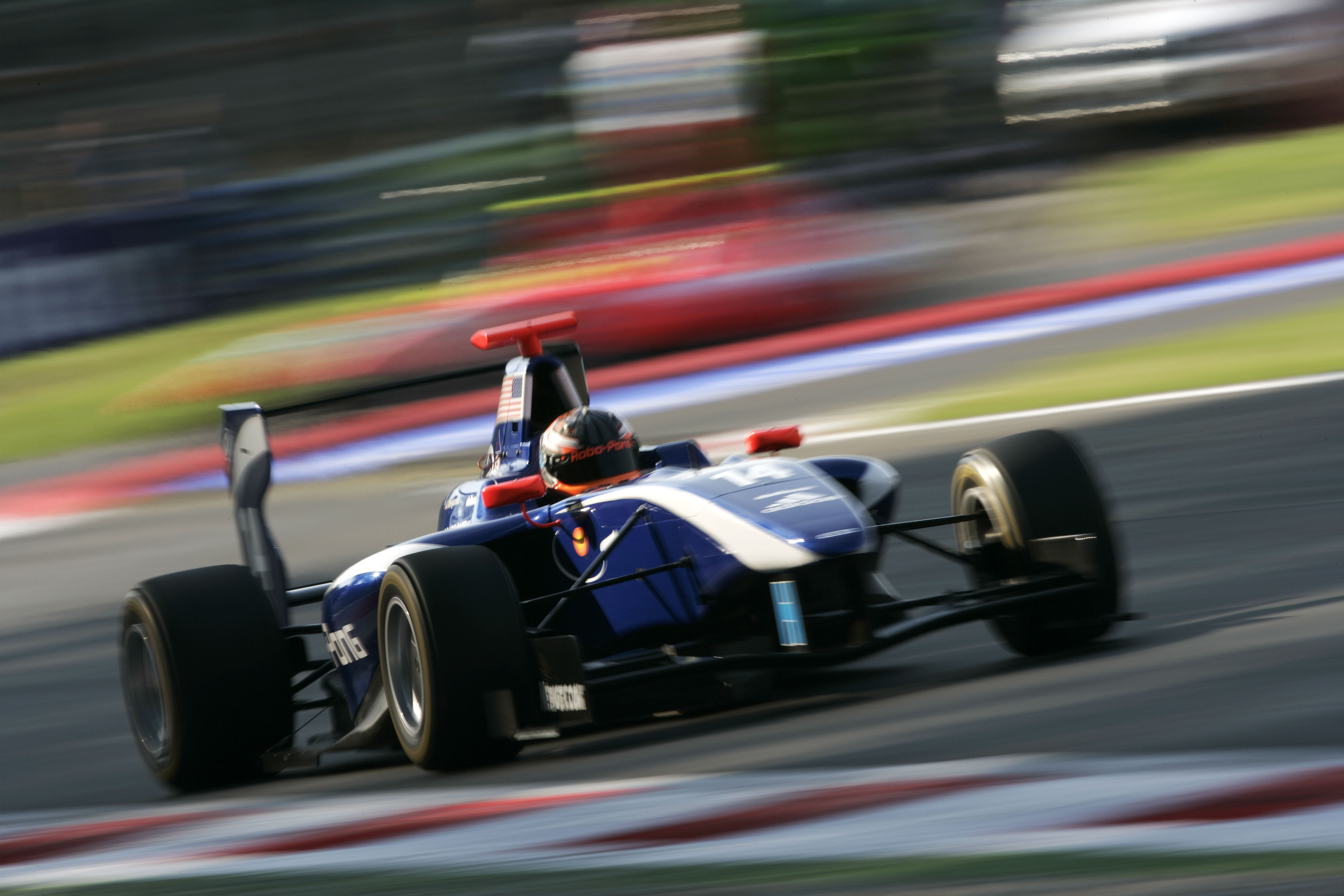
Newgarden competing in the 2010 GP3 Series

In 2010, Newgarden signed to compete at British Formula Three, but his main investor withdrew before the official test session. The driver shifted his focus and instead competed in the newly formed 2010 GP3 Series with Carlin Motorsport. He finished eighteenth overall with eight points. The season was highlighted by a pole position at Hockenheimring and his season best fifth place finish at the finale at Monza.

==== Indy Lights ====
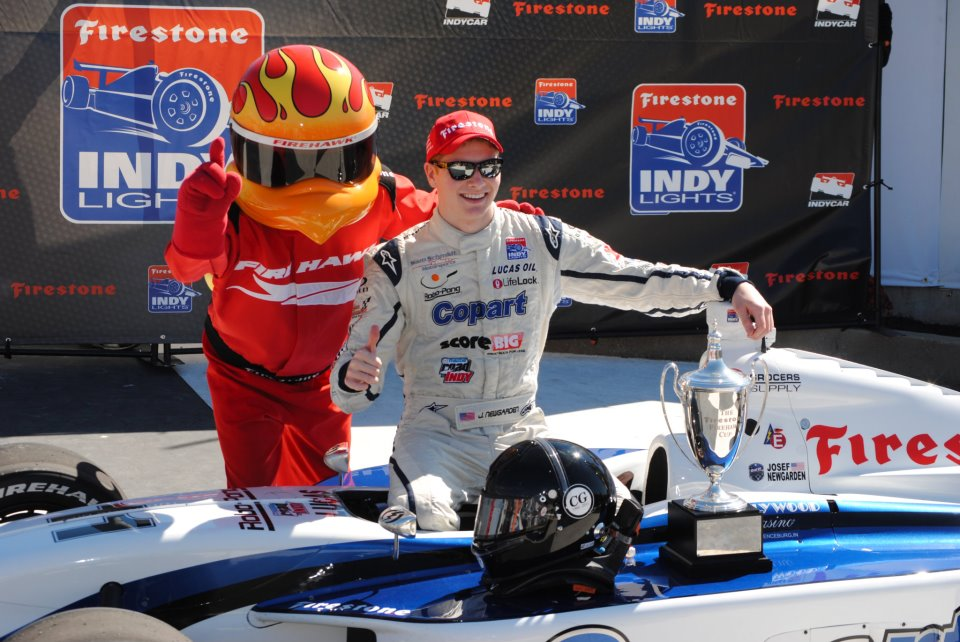
Newgarden clinching the Indy Lights Championship

2011 saw Newgarden returning home to the United States to compete in the Indy Lights Series with Sam Schmidt Motorsports. He won his first Indy Lights race in the season opener on the Streets of St. Petersburg. He followed his opening win with four more wins and ten podium finishes out of thirteen races in 2011. His performance that year clinched him the points championship with one race to go. In New Hampshire, the eleventh race of 2011, Newgarden lapped the entire field and went on to win the race. He was the first Indy Lights driver to do this since Thiago Medeiros in March 2004. Newgarden, as a rookie, would also lead the series with the highest number of wins for the 2011 season.

== IndyCar ==
=== Sarah Fisher Hartman Racing (2012–2014) ===
On December 7, 2011, Newgarden was announced as the driver for Sarah Fisher Hartman Racing. He competed in IndyCar from 2012 to 2014 with Fisher's team. He would earn his first podium at the 2013 race in Baltimore and his second at the Iowa Speedway in 2014.

=== CFH Racing (2015) ===
During his fourth full season in IndyCar, Newgarden raced under the merged team of Sarah Fisher and Ed Carpenter. Under this new team banner, Newgarden started 2015 by finishing in twelfth position at St. Petersburg.

During the fourth race weekend in 2015 at Barber Motorsports Park, Newgarden earned his first IndyCar Series victory at the 2015 Honda Indy Grand Prix of Alabama, moving up from fifth to second place on the first lap of the race, and leading the most laps on his way to a 2.2-second win.

Newgarden would win again that season at the 2015 Honda Indy Toronto and finished the 2015 season seventh in the standings with 431 points.

=== Ed Carpenter Racing (2016) ===
In 2015, Sarah Fisher ended her participation in IndyCar, with Newgarden remaining with the team again known as Ed Carpenter Racing. Newgarden started the 2016 season with a podium at the 2016 Honda Indy Grand Prix of Alabama at Barber Motorsports Park. He just missed qualifying for the pole position at the 2016 Indy 500 and instead started in the middle of the front row. He finished third in the 100th running of the Indianapolis 500.

At the 2016 Firestone 600 at Texas Motor Speedway, Newgarden was injured in a crash that saw him breaking his hand and clavicle. Nevertheless, he returned to the car two weeks later, finishing in a top-ten spot at the 2016 Kohler Grand Prix at Road America.

Then, 28 days after his crash at Texas, Newgarden won the 2016 Iowa Corn 300 in dominating fashion by leading 282 of 300 laps.

At IndyCar's return to Watkins Glen International, the 2016 Grand Prix at the Glen, Newgarden claimed another podium by finishing second in the race. After a sixth-place finish at the 2016 GoPro Grand Prix of Sonoma, he finished the season fourth overall in the season standings, the highest non-Team Penske car in the series.

=== Team Penske (2017–present) ===
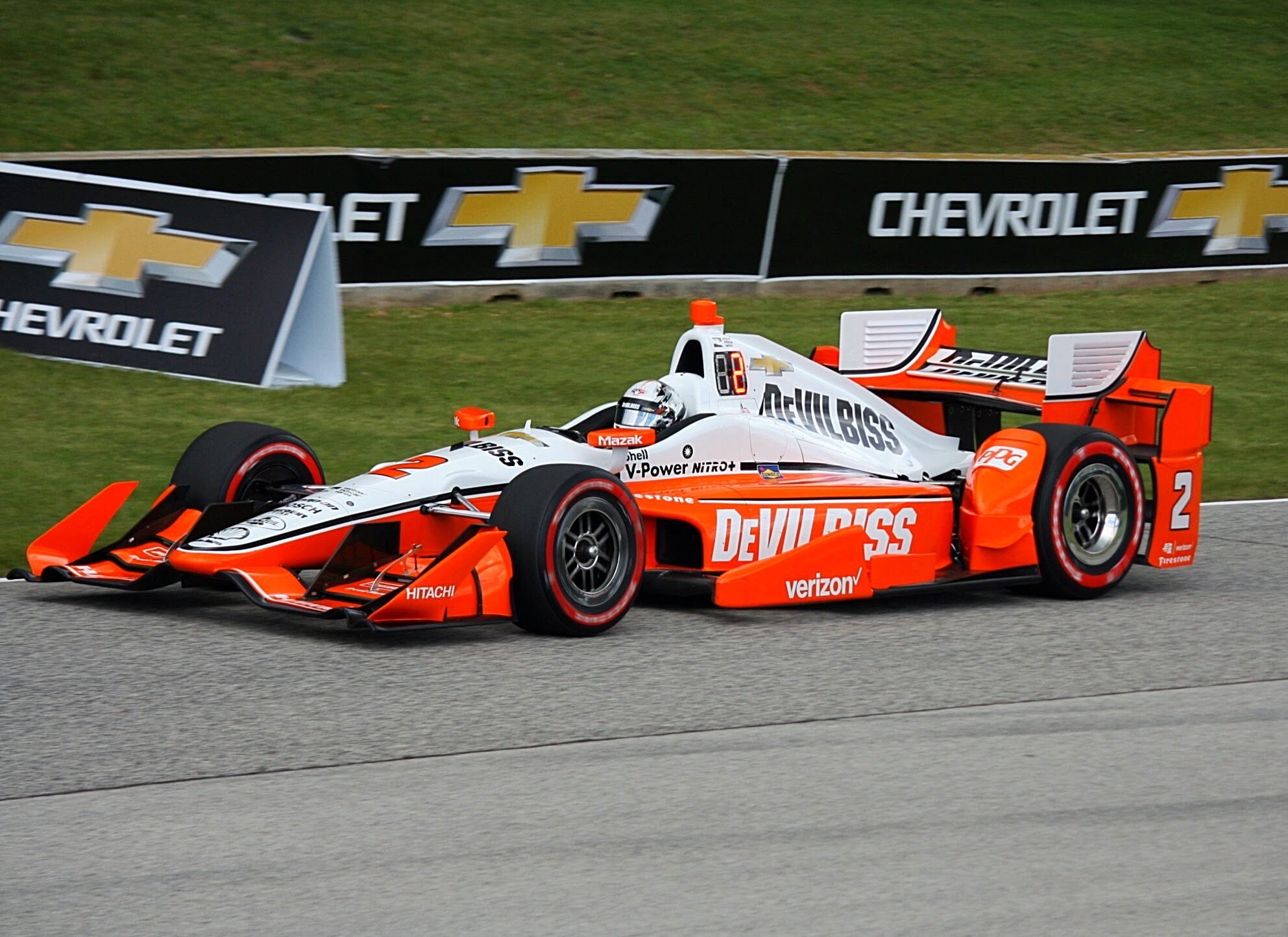
Newgarden racing at Road America in 2017

On September 29, 2016, ECR owner Ed Carpenter confirmed that Newgarden would not be back with the team in 2017. Newgarden moved to Team Penske for the 2017 season, with Team Penske making an official announcement on October 5.

Newgarden won his first race with Team Penske during round 3 of the 2017 season at Barber Motorsports Park; clinching the victory after a duel with Scott Dixon in the final laps. Newgarden moved into the IndyCar points lead following back to back victories at Toronto and Mid Ohio.

At Gateway, Newgarden held off his teammates and Dixon to clinch his fourth series victory of the season, but not without controversy. Newgarden went under teammate Simon Pagenaud very late as they drove into turn one. After bumping tires, both continued, but Pagenaud nearly hit the wall and was obviously not pleased with his teammate's move.

The following week at Watkins Glen, Newgarden had a sizable cushion in the points over second-place Dixon. Coming back onto the track on cold tires after a pit stop, he lost control of the car and Sébastien Bourdais made contact with him which damaged the suspension. Newgarden ended up leaving the Glen with a three-point lead, later a four-point lead, as he won the pole for Sonoma, setting a track record. Newgarden needed to finish fourth or higher regardless of Pagenaud's result and he finished second to clinch his first title. Newgarden became the first American driver to win the Astor Cup since Ryan Hunter-Reay in 2012.

Newgarden won the opening race of the 2019 season at St. Petersburg and followed that up with wins at Detroit, Texas, and Iowa. He led the points standings after every race except the Indianapolis 500, which Team Penske teammate, Simon Pagenaud, won from the pole position. Newgarden won his second IndyCar title at Laguna Seca by only 25 points.

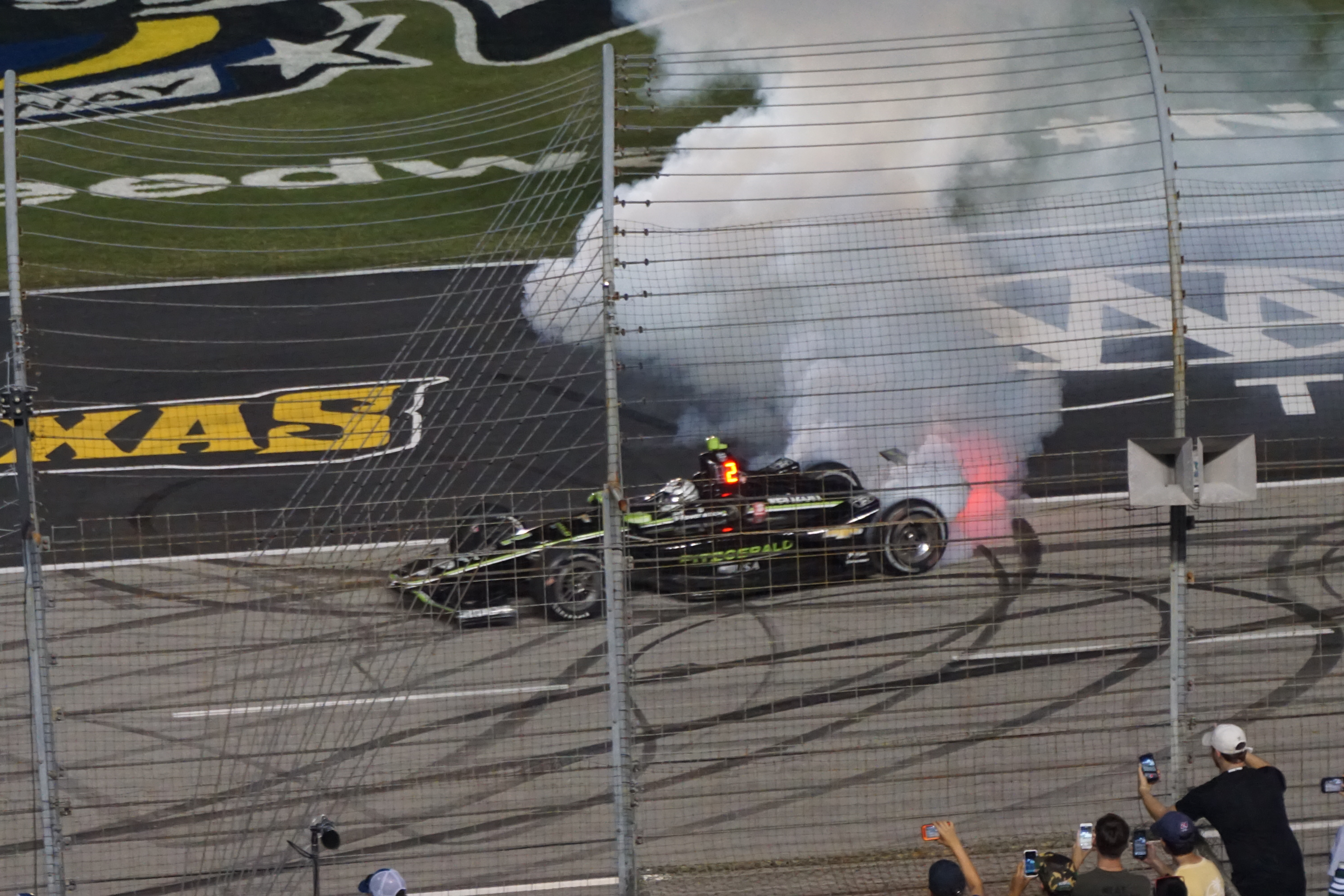
Newgarden celebrating after winning at Texas in 2019

Newgarden started his second title defense slowly in 2020, a season shorted by the COVID-19 pandemic. Although he finished third at the opener in Texas, he found himself in an early-season slump that put him behind rival Scott Dixon. By mid-season down the final strentch of the season, Newgarden produced a series of wins and podium finishes, setting him up for a title-deciding showdown with Dixon at the final round in St. Petersburg. Newgarden could only secure the championship by winning the race; if Dixon finished no better than ninth. In the closing laps of the race, Newgarden overtook Pato O'Ward after a restart and held onto the lead for his second consecutive win in St. Petersburg. Nonetheless, he ultimately failed to defend his title as Dixon finished third.

The 2021 season would be an up-and-down year for Newgarden and Team Penske. Despite earning a season leading four pole positions, Newgarden would not pick up his first win until the tenth race of the season at Mid Ohio. The win was his nineteenth in IndyCar, making him the most successful active American driver. Newgarden picked up a second win at Gateway. Finally, heading into the final race of the season at Long Beach, Newgarden was one of only three drivers who were still mathematically in contention for the title. His fellow competitors Palou and O'Ward were the remaining two Newgarden ultimately finished second in the race, giving him a second-place finish in the championship for the second consecutive year.

In 2022, Newgarden was at times dominant and at times inconsistent. He set a career season high in wins with five; winning at Texas, Long Beach, Road America, Iowa, and Gateway. This would be the most wins by an IndyCar driver in one season since 2016, when former teammate Simon Pagenaud won five races. Newgarden's best finish on the season outside of his five wins was a fourth place finish at Detroit, putting him in a deficit for the championship heading into the season finale.

At the second race in Iowa, Newgarden suffered a heavy crash while leading the race - the result of a suspension failure. Although he was able to exit the car on his own power and subsequently walked away, he collapsed shortly afterwards in his motor home lot, after which he was airlifted to a hospital in Des Moines for further evaluation. Newgarden was later cleared to race in the following weekend's Gallagher Grand Prix. Heading into the season finale at Laguna Seca, Newgarden was one of five drivers in contention for the series title alongside Penske teammates Will Power and Scott McLaughlin, in addition to Scott Dixon and Marcus Ericsson. Although Newgarden mounted a furious charge from 25th to second place during the race, he was ultimately unsuccessful at clinching his third championship as he finished second in the standings to Will Power.

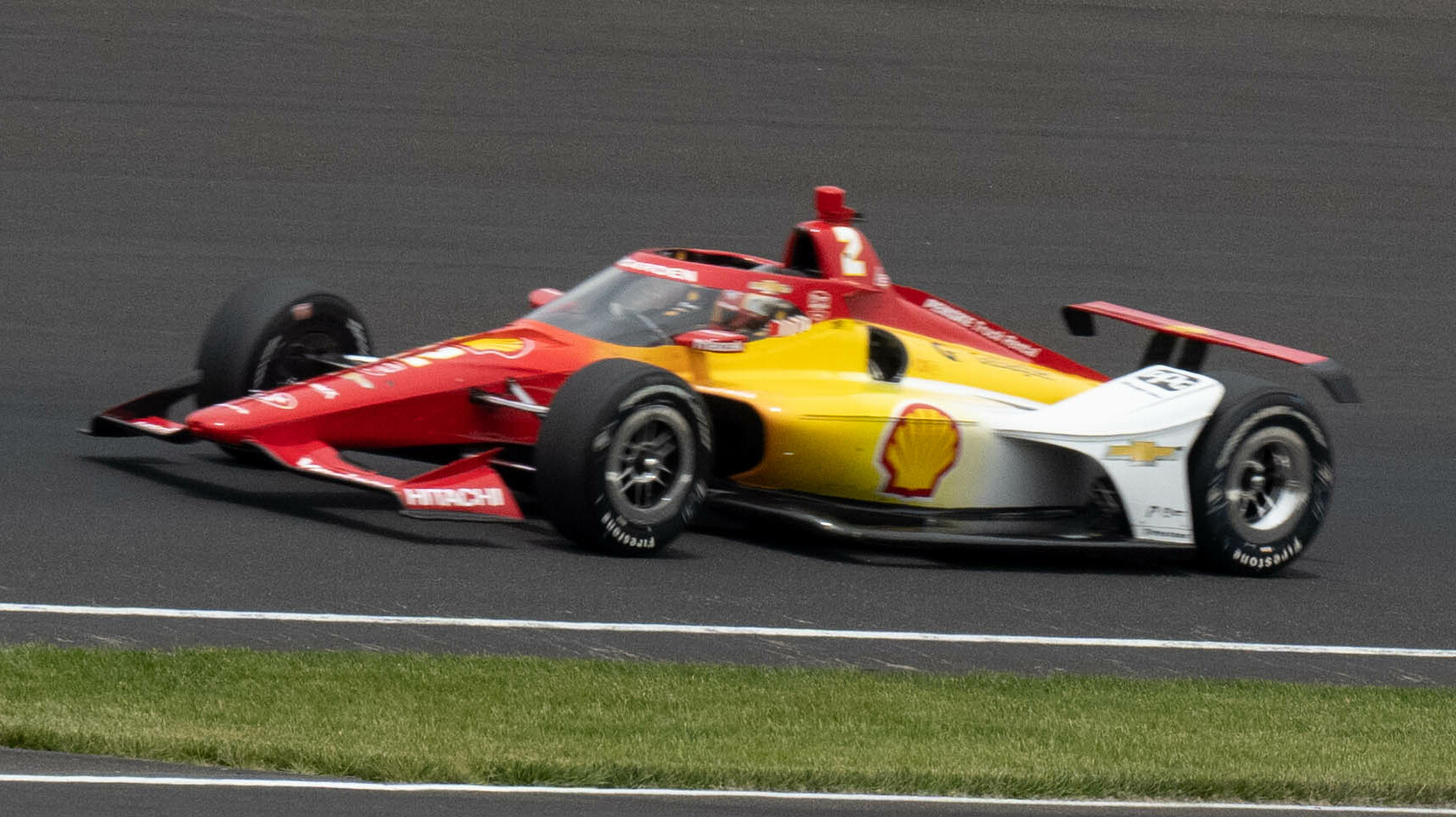
Newgarden en route to victory in the 2023 Indianapolis 500

Newgarden had a challenging 2023 season. It started off positive with two victories during the first half of the season - including his first win in the Indianapolis 500, where he passed Marcus Ericsson on the final lap, after a controversial late-race red flag. Although Newgarden managed to sweep the double header at Iowa for another season of three or more wins, he struggled throughout the season on road and street circuits, recording only one podium finish on a road or street course. While leading at Gateway, he experienced a rare crash which took Newgarden out of the championship hunt with two races to go. Then, after an early retirement at Laguna Seca, he finished fifth in the 2023 IndyCar Series.

Newgarden started 2024 strong with a pole position at St. Petersburg, but had his victory stripped away after Team Penske was penalized for violating push-to-pass regulations. Newgarden rebounded by winning the 108th Indy 500, achieving back to back Indy 500 victories. Newgarden became the first consecutive winner of the Indy 500 since Helio Castroneves had done the same thing 22 years earlier, also driving for Team Penske.

Newgarden started the 2025 season with a third-place finish at St. Petersburg. During qualifications for the 2025 Indianapolis 500, both Newgarden and his teammate, Will Power, failed inspections because of modified attenuators on the cars. The drivers were ordered to start at the rear of the field for the prestigious event. The drivers' team strategists were initially suspended for the remainder of the Indy 500; later on they were fired. Both drivers also forfeited their qualification points and were fined $100,000. During the Indy 500, Newgarden worked his way up to sixth place before retiring on lap 135 due to a fuel pressure problem, ending his chances of a three-peat. After a roller- coaster season that saw very few podiums and poles, Newgarden finally won at his home race in Nashville.

== Other racing ==
Newgarden participated in the 2018 Race of Champions in Riyadh, Saudi Arabia and the 2019 Race of Champions at Autodromo Hermanos Rodríguez in Mexico City, Mexico, both times for Team USA.

On February 23, 2022, it was announced that Newgarden would be a guest driver in Tony Stewart's Superstar Racing Experience at the Nashville Fairgrounds Speedway, in Newgarden's hometown of Nashville.

On December 5, 2022, Newgarden announced that he would be teaming up with fellow Team Penske IndyCar driver Scott McLaughlin and Indy NXT driver Kyffin Simpson and would be entering the 2023 24 Hours of Daytona with an LMP2 entry. Newgarden would return later in the year at the Petit Le Mans driving for Porsche Penske Motorsport driving the No. 7 in the GTP Class alongside Matt Campbell and Felipe Nasr they would finish fourth overall. In 2024, Newgarden would return to Porsche Penske Motorsport at the 2024 24 Hours of Daytona again driving the No. 7 alongside Campbell and Nasr and Dane Cameron after a long race the No. 7 team would win the 24 Hours of Daytona.

== Driver profile ==
Since his second season in the IndyCar Series, Newgarden has been regarded as a very versatile driver capable of competing across the variety of circuit types used in the championship. He has achieved victories on road courses, street circuits, short ovals, and superspeedways. His performance on oval tracks, particularly from 2019 onward, led to the nickname of "The Oval King", after a period in which he won a significant portion of IndyCar oval races. On road and street courses, he has also been noted for his use of outside-line overtaking, a tactic that has been informally referred to by some commentators and drivers as the Josef Newgarden Move.

Newgarden is known to race his teammates harder than other IndyCar drivers, and has been at the center of some of the most infamous finishes in IndyCar history. Most famously was the 2023 Indianapolis 500, where after a series of red flag incidents, Newgarden passed Marcus Ericsson with two corners to go on the final lap before weaving briefly into the pit lane to take away clean air from Ericsson and win the race. Although the move was considered legal, IndyCar ended up banning weaving into pit lane at the Indianapolis 500 for safety and sporting reasons.

== Authorship ==
Outside of racing, Newgarden collaborated on the children’s book Josef’s BIG Dream: An INDY 500 Story with his wife Ashley and author Andy Amendola. The book was released by Amendola's children's book publishing company, Red Racer Books, in conjunction with IndyCar. The book highlights Newgarden's career path from childhood ambition to becoming a two-time Indianapolis 500 winner.

== Personal life ==
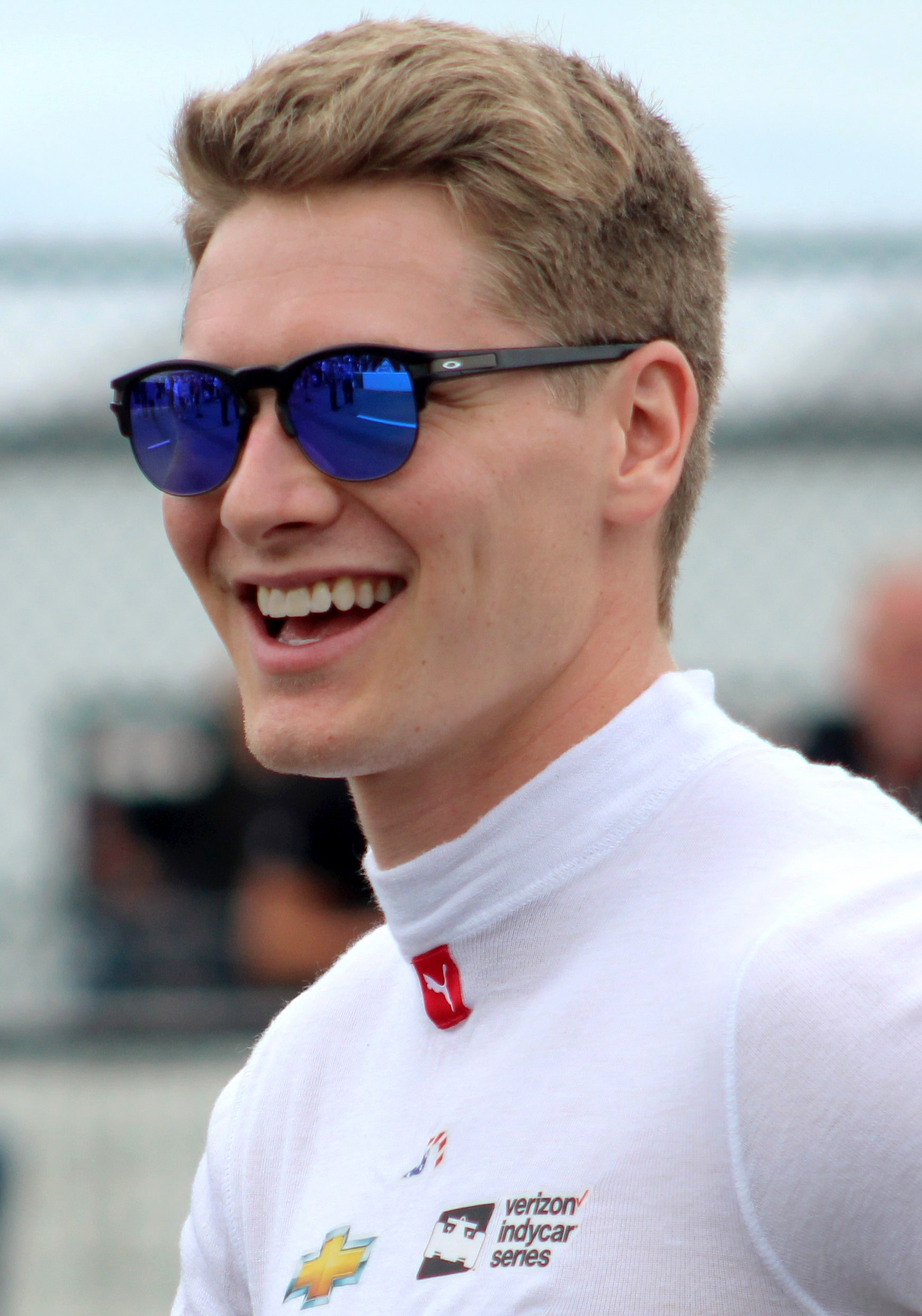
Newgarden at the 2018 ABC Supply 500

Newgarden was born at Vanderbilt Hospital in Nashville, Tennessee. His parents named him "Josef" to honor his mother's Danish heritage. His parents moved from Miami, Florida, in 1986 with the family photography business. He is the youngest of three siblings, having two older sisters. Newgarden has said in an interview that he is half Danish via his mother, and he holds a Danish passport. He credits watching racing on TV at an early age with his father, who was an avid fan of NASCAR, IndyCar and Formula 1, as what got him into the sport.

Newgarden grew up in Hendersonville, Tennessee, and attended Pope John Paul II High School, where he was friends with and a former classmate of NFL Pro Bowl wide receiver Golden Tate. Additionally, he was a former classmate of NASCAR driver Josh Berry in the 7th and 8th grades.

Before he was a race car driver, Newgarden played baseball, football, and basketball.

On October 7, 2018, Newgarden announced that he and his longtime girlfriend, Ashley Welch, had gotten engaged while on a trip to Japan. They were married in Nashville in the fall of 2019. In 2022, Newgarden's wife gave birth to their first child.

Newgarden has a YouTube channel on which he posts vlogs and behind the scenes content of his IndyCar race weekends. The channel also features a now discontinued video series with his Penske teammate Scott McLaughlin titled Bus Bros.

== Media appearances ==
Along with fellow racers Tony Kanaan and Helio Castroneves, he competed in the Indianapolis round of season 8 of American Ninja Warrior in 2016.

Newgarden is the driver ambassador for the SeriousFun Children's Network, a charity started by actor and race team owner Paul Newman. Newgarden is also a ping-pong player. He hosts an annual celebrity tournament during May that raises funds for the Serious Fun Children's Network. In 2019, the tournament raised over $100,000 for the charity.

Newgarden is a gamer and was a brand ambassador for the Microsoft title Forza Motorsport 7. His voice is featured in the game and he is featured in Forza content.

Newgarden was featured on several episodes of CMT's Nashville Squares during the fall of 2019.

== Racing record ==
=== Career summary ===
Season	Series	Team	Races	Wins	Poles	F/Laps	Podiums	Points	Position
2006–07	Skip Barber Southern	RT LLC	12	3	3	5	10	443	**2nd**
2007	Skip Barber National	RT LLC	14	2	3	3	4	326	6th
2007	Skip Barber Southern Regional Run-Offs	RT LLC	?	0	0	0	0	0	NC
2007–08	Skip Barber Southern	RT LLC	2	0	1	1	1	61	29th
2008	Skip Barber National	RT LLC	14	3	6	3	5	372	**2nd**
2008	Ontario Formula Ford Challenge F1600-A	RT LLC	2	0	0	0	0	0	NC
2008	Skip Barber Eastern	RT LLC	1	0	0	0	0	0	NC
2008	Skip Barber Mid Western	RT LLC	1	1	0	1	1	69	35th
2008	IMSA Lites L1 Presented by Hankook	Batos Racing	2	0	0	1	1	16	19th
2008	Formula Ford 1600 Walter Hayes Trophy	Team USA / Cliff Dempsey Racing	1	0	0	0	0	N/A	14th
2008	Formula Ford Festival – Kent Class	Team USA / Cliff Dempsey Racing	1	1	0	0	1	N/A	**1st**
2009	British Formula Ford Championship	JTR	25	9	4	8	16	550	**2nd**
2009	Formula Ford Festival	JTR	1	0	0	0	0	N/A	NC
2009	Formula Palmer Audi	MotorSport Vision	3	2	0	0	2	64	18th
2009	Formula Ford 1600 Walter Hayes Trophy		1	0	0	0	0	N/A	6th
2010	GP3 Series	Carlin	15	0	1	0	0	8	18th
2011	Indy Lights	Sam Schmidt Motorsports	14	5	3	4	10	533	**1st**
2012	IndyCar Series	Sarah Fisher Hartman Racing	14	0	0	3	0	200	23rd
2013	IndyCar Series	Sarah Fisher Hartman Racing	19	0	0	0	1	348	14th
2014	IndyCar Series	Sarah Fisher Hartman Racing	18	0	0	2	1	406	13th
2015	IndyCar Series	CFH Racing	16	2	1	0	4	431	7th
2016	IndyCar Series	Ed Carpenter Racing	16	1	0	3	4	502	4th
2017	IndyCar Series	Team Penske	17	4	1	5	9	642	**1st**
2018	IndyCar Series	Team Penske	17	3	4	2	3	560	5th
2019	IndyCar Series	Team Penske	17	4	2	4	7	641	**1st**
2020	IndyCar Series	Team Penske	14	4	3	1	6	521	**2nd**
2021	IndyCar Series	Team Penske	16	2	4	2	6	511	**2nd**
2022	IndyCar Series	Team Penske	17	5	1	3	6	544	**2nd**
2023	IndyCar Series	Team Penske	17	4	0	1	5	479	5th
2023	IMSA SportsCar Championship – GTP	Porsche Penske Motorsport	1	0	0	0	0	304	22nd
2023	IMSA SportsCar Championship – LMP2	Tower Motorsports	1	0	0	0	0	0	NC†
2024	IndyCar Series	Team Penske	17	2	1	3	6	401	8th
2024	IMSA SportsCar Championship – GTP	Porsche Penske Motorsport	1	1	0	0	1	380	24th
2025	IndyCar Series	Team Penske	17	1	1	1	3	316	12th
2026	IndyCar Series	Team Penske	18	2	0	3	3	423	8th

^{†} Points only counted towards the Michelin Endurance Cup, and not the overall LMP2 Championship. ^{*} Season still in progress.

=== Complete British Formula Ford Championship results ===
(key) (Races in bold indicate pole position)

Year	Entrant	Chassis	1	2	3	4	5	6	7	8	9	10	11	12	13	14	15	16	17	18	19	20	21	22	23	24	25	DC	Points
2009	JTR	Mygale SJ09	OUL; 1 Ret	OUL; 2; 3	OUL; 3; 1	ROC; 1; 1	ROC; 2; 5	**ROC**; **3**; 3	KNO; 1; 14	KNO; 2; 5	**KNO**; **3**; 5	**SNE**; **1**; 1	**SNE**; **2**; 1	SNE; 3; 3	DON; 1; 2	DON; 2; 1	**DON**; **3**; 2	SIL; 1 Ret	SIL; 2; 1	**SIL**; **3**; 16	**BHI**; **1**; 1	BHI; 2; 1	BHI; 3; 5	BHGP; 1 DSQ	**BHGP**; **2**; 1	CAS; 1; 2	CAS; 2; 2	2nd	550

=== Complete GP3 Series results ===
(key) (Races in bold indicate pole position)

Year	Entrant	1	2	3	4	5	6	7	8	9	10	11	12	13	14	15	16	DC	Points
2010	Carlin	CAT; FEA; Ret	CAT; SPR; 16	IST; FEA; 10	IST; SPR; 23	VAL; FEA; Ret	VAL; SPR; 26	SIL; FEA; 16	SIL; SPR; 11	**HOC**; **FEA**; 18	HOC; SPR; 19	HUN; FEA; 7	HUN; SPR; Ret	SPA; FEA; DNS	SPA; SPR; 21	MNZ; FEA; 7	MNZ; SPR; 5	18th	8

=== American open–wheel racing results ===
(key)

==== Indy Lights ====
Year	Team	1	2	3	4	5	6	7	8	9	10	11	12	13	14	Rank	Points
2011	Sam Schmidt Motorsports	STP; 1	ALA; 6	LBH; 13	INDY; 1	MIL; 2	IOW; 1	TOR; 8	**EDM**; 2	**EDM**; 1	TRO; 3	**NHM**; 1	BAL; 2	KTY; 2	LVS; 9	1st	553

==== IndyCar Series ====
Year	Team	No.	Chassis	Engine	1	2	3	4	5	6	7	8	9	10	11	12	13	14	15	16	17	18	19	Rank	Points	Ref
2012	Sarah Fisher Hartman Racing	67	Dallara DW12	Honda	STP; 11	ALA; 17	LBH; 26	SAO; 23	INDY; 25	DET; 15	TXS; 13	MIL; 25	IOW; 19	TOR; 13	EDM; 17	MDO; 12	SNM; 23	BAL	FON; 16					23rd	200	
2013	Sarah Fisher Hartman Racing	67	Dallara DW12	Honda	STP; 23	ALA; 9	LBH; 13	SAO; 5		DET; 7	DET; 16	TXS; 8	MIL; 11	IOW; 15	POC; 5	TOR; 23	TOR; 11	MDO; 23	SNM; 24	BAL; 2	HOU; 5	HOU; 13	FON; 20	14th	348	
2013	Sarah Fisher Hartman Racing	21	Dallara DW12	Honda					INDY; 28															14th	348	
2014	Sarah Fisher Hartman Racing	67	Dallara DW12	Honda	STP; 9	LBH; 19	ALA; 8	IMS; 17	INDY; 30	DET; 20	DET; 17	TXS; 11	HOU; 20	HOU; 20	POC; 8	IOW; 2	TOR; 20	TOR; 13	MDO; 12	MIL; 5	SNM; 6	FON; 10		13th	406	
2015	CFH Racing	67	Dallara DW12	Chevrolet	STP; 12	NLA; 9	LBH; 7	ALA; 1			DET; 8	DET; 21	TXS; 21	TOR; 1	FON; 21	**MIL**; 5	IOW; 2	MDO; 13	POC; 2	SNM; 21				7th	431	
2015	CFH Racing	21	Dallara DW12	Chevrolet					IMS; 20	INDY; 9														7th	431	
2016	Ed Carpenter Racing	21	Dallara DW12	Chevrolet	STP; 22	PHX; 6	LBH; 10	ALA; 3	IMS; 21	INDY; 3	DET; 14	DET; 4	ROA; 8	IOW; 1	TOR; 22	MDO; 10	POC; 4	TXS; 22	WGL; 2	SNM; 6				4th	502	
2017	Team Penske	2	Dallara DW12	Chevrolet	STP; 8	LBH; 3	ALA; 1	PHX; 9	IMS; 11	INDY; 19	DET; 4	DET; 2	TXS; 13	ROA; 2	IOW; 6	TOR; 1	MDO; 1	POC; 2	GTW; 1	WGL; 18	**SNM**; 2			1st	642	
2018	Team Penske	1	Dallara DW12	Chevrolet	STP; 7	PHX; 1	LBH; 7	**ALA**; 1	IMS; 11	INDY; 8	DET; 9	DET; 15	**TXS**; 13	**ROA**; 1	IOW; 4	**TOR**; 9	MDO; 4	POC; 5	GTW; 7	POR; 10	SNM; 8			5th	560	
2019	Team Penske	2	Dallara DW12	Chevrolet	STP; 1	COA; 2	ALA; 4	LBH; 2	IMS; 15	INDY; 4	DET; 1	**DET**; 19	TXS; 1	ROA; 3	TOR; 4	IOW; 1	MDO; 14	**POC**; 5	**GTW**; 7	POR; 5	LAG; 8			1st	641	
2020	Team Penske	1	Dallara DW12	Chevrolet	**TXS**; 3	IMS; 7	**ROA**; 14	ROA; 9	IOW; 5	**IOW**; 1	INDY; 5	GTW; 12	GTW; 1	MDO; 2	MDO; 8	IMS; 1	IMS; 4	STP; 1						2nd	521	
2021	Team Penske	2	Dallara DW12	Chevrolet	ALA; 23	STP; 2	TXS; 6	TXS; 2	IMS; 4	INDY; 12	DET; 10	**DET**; 2	**ROA**; 21	**MDO**; 1	NSH; 10	IMS; 8	GTW; 1	POR; 5	LAG; 7	**LBH**; 2				2nd	511	
2022	Team Penske	2	Dallara DW12	Chevrolet	STP; 16	TXS; 1	LBH; 1	ALA; 14	IMS; 25	INDY; 13	**DET**; 4	ROA; 1	MDO; 7	TOR; 10	IOW; 1	IOW; 24	IMS; 5	NSH; 6	GTW; 1	POR; 8	LAG; 2			2nd	544	
2023	Team Penske	2	Dallara DW12	Chevrolet	STP; 17	TXS; 1	LBH; 9	ALA; 15	IMS; 7	INDY; 1	DET; 10	ROA; 2	MDO; 12	TOR; 5	IOW; 1	IOW; 1	NSH; 4	IMS; 25	GTW; 25	POR; 5	LAG; 21			5th	479	
2024	Team Penske	2	Dallara DW12	Chevrolet	**STP**; 26	THE; 8	LBH; 4	ALA; 16	IMS; 17	INDY; 1	DET; 26	ROA; 2	LAG; 19	MDO; 25	IOW; 3	IOW; 7	TOR; 11	GTW; 1	POR; 3	MIL; 26	**MIL**; 27	NSH; 3		8th	401	
2025	Team Penske	2	Dallara DW12	Chevrolet	STP; 3	THE; 13	LBH; 27	ALA; 10	IMS; 12	INDY; 22	DET; 9	GTW; 25	ROA; 25	MDO; 27	**IOW**; 2	IOW; 10	TOR; 24	LAG; 11	POR; 24	MIL; 7	NSH; 1			12th	316	
2026	Team Penske	2	Dallara DW12	Chevrolet	STP; 7	PHX; 1	ARL; 15	ALA; 10	LBH; 14	IMS; 4	INDY; 28	DET; 10	GTW; 1	ROA; 22	MOH; 9	NSH; 2	POR; 8	MRK; 13	WSH; 8	MIL; 7	MIL; 25	LAG; 15		8th	423	

Years	Teams	Races	Poles	Wins	Top 5s	Top 10s	Indianapolis 500 wins	Championships
15	4	244	19	35	93	146	2	2

==== Indianapolis 500 ====
Year	Chassis	Engine	Start	Finish	Team
2012	Dallara	Honda	7	25	Sarah Fisher Hartman Racing
2013	Dallara	Honda	25	28	Sarah Fisher Hartman Racing
2014	Dallara	Honda	8	30	Sarah Fisher Hartman Racing
2015	Dallara	Chevrolet	9	9	CFH Racing
2016	Dallara	Chevrolet	2	3	Ed Carpenter Racing
2017	Dallara	Chevrolet	22	19	Team Penske
2018	Dallara	Chevrolet	4	8	Team Penske
2019	Dallara	Chevrolet	8	4	Team Penske
2020	Dallara	Chevrolet	13	5	Team Penske
2021	Dallara	Chevrolet	21	12	Team Penske
2022	Dallara	Chevrolet	14	13	Team Penske
2023	Dallara	Chevrolet	17	1	Team Penske
2024	Dallara	Chevrolet	3	1	Team Penske
2025	Dallara	Chevrolet	32	22	Team Penske
2026	Dallara	Chevrolet	23	28	Team Penske

=== Superstar Racing Experience ===
(key) * – Most laps led. ^{1} – Heat 1 winner. ^{2} – Heat 2 winner.

Superstar Racing Experience results
Year	No.	1	2	3	4	5	6	SRXC	Pts
2022	2	FIF	SBO	STA	NSV; 7^{1}	I55	SHA	22nd	0^{1}
2023	2	STA	STA	MMI; 11	BER	ELD	LOS	22nd	0^{1}

=== Complete IMSA SportsCar Championship results ===
(key) (Races in bold indicate pole position; results in italics indicate fastest lap)

Year	Team	Class	Make	Engine	1	2	3	4	5	6	7	8	9	Pos.	Points
2023	Tower Motorsports	LMP2	Oreca 07	Gibson GK428 4.2 L V8	DAY; 5†	SEB		LGA	WGL		ELK	IMS		NC†	0†
2023	Porsche Penske Motorsport	GTP	Porsche 963	Porsche 9RD 4.6 L V8			LBH			MOS			PET; 4	22nd	304
2024	Porsche Penske Motorsport	GTP	Porsche 963	Porsche 9RD 4.6 L V8	DAY; 1	SEB	LBH	LGA	DET	WGL	ELK	IMS	PET	24th	380

^{†} Points only counted towards the Michelin Endurance Cup, and not the overall LMP2 Championship.

==== 24 Hours of Daytona ====
24 Hours of Daytona results
Year	Class	No.	Team	Car	Co-drivers	Laps	Position	Class Pos.
2023	LMP2	8	(United States) Tower Motorsports	Oreca 07-Gibson	(Canada) John Farano (New Zealand) Scott McLaughlin (Barbados) Kyffin Simpson	759	11th	5th
2024	GTP	7	(Germany) Porsche Penske Motorsport	Porsche 963	(United States) Dane Cameron (Australia) Matt Campbell (Brazil) Felipe Nasr	791	**1st**	**1st**

Sporting positions
Preceded by Jean-Karl Vernay	Indy Lights; Champion; 2011	Succeeded by Tristan Vautier
Preceded by Simon Pagenaud	IndyCar Series; Champion; 2017	Succeeded by Scott Dixon
Preceded by Scott Dixon	IndyCar Series; Champion; 2019	Succeeded by Scott Dixon
Preceded by Marcus Ericsson	Indianapolis 500; Winner; 2023; 2024	Succeeded by Álex Palou
