= 2019 Honda Indy Toronto =

(Canada) 2019 Toronto
Race details
11th round of the 2019 IndyCar season
← Previous race	Next race →
- Date: July 14, 2019
- Official name: Honda Indy Toronto
- Location: Exhibition Place
- Course: Temporary road course 1.786 mi / 2.874 km
- Distance: 85 laps 151.81 mi / 244.314 km
- Weather: Temperatures reaching up to 28.2 °C (82.8 °F); with negligible wind speed

Pole position
- Driver: Simon Pagenaud (Team Penske)
- Time: 58.4293; 110.041 mph

Fastest lap
- Driver: Marcus Ericsson (Arrow Schmidt Peterson Motorsports)
- Time: 60.0407; 107.087 mph (on lap 58 of 85)

Podium
- First: Simon Pagenaud (Team Penske)
- Second: Scott Dixon (Chip Ganassi Racing)
- Third: Alexander Rossi (Andretti Autosport)

The 2019 Honda Indy Toronto was an IndyCar Series motor race held on 14 July 2019 at the Exhibition Place in Toronto, Ontario, Canada. It was the 11th race of the 2019 IndyCar Series season, and the 38th race at the event. It was won by Team Penske driver Simon Pagenaud who started from pole and led eighty of the eighty-five laps. Scott Dixon finished in second for Chip Ganassi Racing while Alexander Rossi came third for Andretti Autosport.

== Background ==
The Honda Indy Toronto was confirmed as part of the IndyCar's 2019 series schedule in September 2018. It was the third of a four-year deal that Honda Canada had contracted with the contract ending in 2020. Heading into the Toronto round, Team Penske driver Josef Newgarden lead the driver's championship with 402 points. His nearest rival and the last's round winner, Alexander Rossi from Andretti Autosport was seven points behind. Third was Simon Pagenaud from Team Penske a further 54 points behind with Scott Dixon and Will Power rounding out the top five.

Before the race started, Canadian driver Robert Wickens, who was still recovering from a heavy accident in Pocono the previous year, drove several parade laps around the circuit in a modified Arrow Acura NSX pace car with hand controls. Wickens also gave the starting command.

== Results ==
Key	Meaning
R	Rookie
W	Past winner

=== Qualifying ===
Pos	No.	Name	Grp.	Round 1	Round 2	Firestone Fast 6

=== Race ===
Classification
Pos	No.	Driver	Team	Engine	Laps	Time/Retired	Grid	Laps Led	Pts.
1	22	(France) Simon Pagenaud	Team Penske	Chevrolet	85	1:30:16.4388 (100.9 mph)	1	80	54
2	9	(New Zealand) Scott Dixon W	Chip Ganassi Racing	Honda	85	+0.1373	2		40
3	27	(United States) Alexander Rossi	Andretti Autosport	Honda	85	+4.3720	4		35
4	2	(United States) Josef Newgarden W	Team Penske	Chevrolet	85	+18.6722	5		32
5	10	(Sweden) Felix Rosenqvist R	Chip Ganassi Racing	Honda	85	+20.7432	3		30
6	5	(Canada) James Hinchcliffe	Arrow Schmidt Peterson Motorsports	Honda	85	+27.6710	14		28
7	88	(United States) Colton Herta R	Harding Steinbrenner Racing	Honda	85	+32.0640	16		26
8	18	(France) Sébastien Bourdais W	Dale Coyne Racing with Vasser-Sullivan	Honda	85	+33.5415	8		24
9	15	(United States) Graham Rahal	Rahal Letterman Lanigan Racing	Honda	85	+35.3604	12		22
10	98	(United States) Marco Andretti	Andretti Herta Autosport w/Marco Andretti & Curb-Agajanian	Honda	85	+45.4178	7		20
11	19	(United States) Santino Ferrucci R	Dale Coyne Racing	Honda	85	+53.4942	17		19
12	20	(United Arab Emirates) Ed Jones	Ed Carpenter Racing	Chevrolet	84	+1 Lap	12		18
13	26	(United States) Zach Veach	Andretti Autosport	Honda	84	+1 Lap	18	4	18
14	59	(United Kingdom) Max Chilton	Carlin	Chevrolet	84	+1 Lap	13		16
15	21	(United States) Spencer Pigot	Ed Carpenter Racing	Chevrolet	84	+1 Lap	9		15
16	28	(United States) Ryan Hunter-Reay W	Andretti Autosport	Honda	84	+1 Lap	11		14
17	14	(Brazil) Tony Kanaan	A. J. Foyt Enterprises	Chevrolet	84	+1 Lap	22		13
18	12	(Australia) Will Power W	Team Penske	Chevrolet	83	Crash T8	12		12
19	4	(Brazil) Matheus Leist	A. J. Foyt Enterprises	Chevrolet	83	+2 Laps	19		11
20	7	(Sweden) Marcus Ericsson R	Arrow Schmidt Peterson Motorsports	Honda	81	+4 Laps	20		10
21	31	(United States) Sage Karam	Carlin	Chevrolet	79	+6 Laps	21		9
22	30	(Japan) Takuma Sato	Rahal Letterman Lanigan Racing	Honda	67	Engine Fire	10	1	9
OFFICIAL BOX SCORE

Notes: ^{1} Points include 1 point for leading at least 1 lap during a race, an additional 2 points for leading the most race laps, and 1 point for Pole Position.

== Championship standings after the race ==
Drivers' Championship standings

Pos	Driver	Points
1	(United States) Josef Newgarden	434
2	(United States) Alexander Rossi	430
3	(France) Simon Pagenaud	395
4	(New Zealand) Scott Dixon	348
5	(Australia) Will Power	306

Manufacturer standings

Pos	Manufacturer	Points
1	(Japan) Honda	901
2	(United States) Chevrolet	842

- Note: Only the top five positions are included.

Previous race: 2019 REV Group Grand Prix at Road America	IndyCar Series; 2019 season	Next race: 2019 Iowa 300
Previous race: 2018 Honda Indy Toronto	Honda Indy Toronto	Next race: 2022 Honda Indy Toronto
