= 2019 Iowa 300 =

(United States) 2019 Iowa 300
Race details
12th round of the 2019 IndyCar season
← Previous race	Next race →
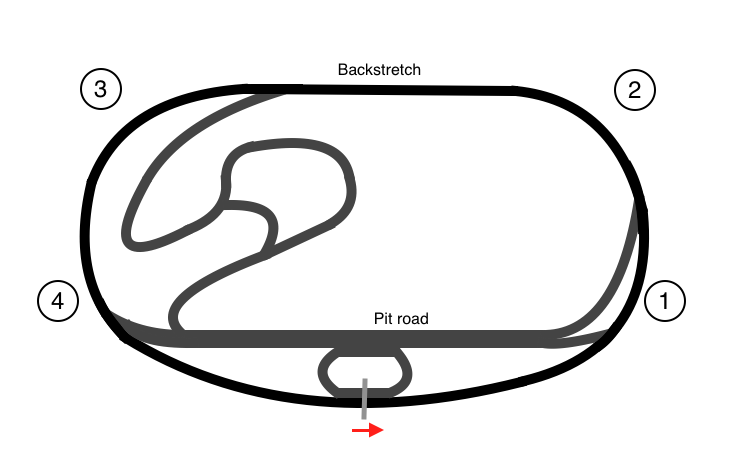
- Date: July 20, 2019
- Official name: Iowa 300
- Location: Iowa Speedway
- Course: Permanent racing facility 0.875 mi / 1.4 km
- Distance: 300 laps 268.2 mi / 431.6 km

Pole position
- Driver: (France) Simon Pagenaud (Team Penske)
- Time: 17.8479 + 17.8976 = 35.7455

Fastest lap
- Driver: (United States) Josef Newgarden (Team Penske)
- Time: 18.1160 (on lap 202 of 300)

Podium
- First: (United States) Josef Newgarden (Team Penske)
- Second: (New Zealand) Scott Dixon (Chip Ganassi Racing)
- Third: (United States) James Hinchcliffe (Arrow Schmidt Peterson Motorsports)

The 2019 Iowa 300 was the twelfth round of the 2019 IndyCar Series season, contested over 300 laps at the 0.875-mile (1.4 km) Iowa Speedway in Newton, Iowa. Simon Pagenaud claimed his third pole position of the season, while Josef Newgarden went on to win his 4th race of the season and 14th of his career.

== Results ==
Key	Meaning
R	Rookie
W	Past winner

=== Qualifying ===
Pos	No.	Name	Lap 1 Time	Lap 2 Time	Total Time	Avg. Speed (mph)
1	22	(France) Simon Pagenaud	17.8479	17.8976	35.7455	180.073
2	12	(Australia) Will Power	17.9254	17.9164	35.8418	179.589
3	2	(United States) Josef Newgarden W	17.8886	17.9813	35.8699	179.449
4	30	(Japan) Takuma Sato	17.9605	18.2733	36.2338	177.646
5	5	(Canada) James Hinchcliffe W	18.1780	18.3532	36.5312	176.200
6	27	(United States) Alexander Rossi	18.2530	18.3079	36.5609	176.057
7	15	(United States) Graham Rahal	18.3540	18.2484	36.6024	175.857
8	9	(New Zealand) Scott Dixon	18.3343	18.2957	36.6300	175.725
9	28	(United States) Ryan Hunter-Reay W	18.3063	18.3459	36.6522	175.618
10	7	(Sweden) Marcus Ericsson R	18.3582	18.3025	36.6607	175.578
11	88	(United States) Colton Herta R	18.3381	18.3710	36.7091	175.346
12	19	(United States) Santino Ferrucci R	18.3977	18.3178	36.7155	175.316
13	14	(Brazil) Tony Kanaan W	18.3081	18.5055	36.8136	174.848
14	31	(United States) Sage Karam	18.5027	18.4219	36.9246	174.323
15	10	(Sweden) Felix Rosenqvist R	18.3883	18.5545	36.9428	174.237
16	59	(United States) Conor Daly	18.5098	18.5180	37.0278	173.837
17	20	(United States) Ed Carpenter	18.5000	18.5911	37.0911	173.540
18	98	(United States) Marco Andretti W	18.4927	18.7047	37.1974	173.044
19	21	(United States) Spencer Pigot	18.5621	18.9067	37.4688	171.791
20	26	(United States) Zach Veach	18.6744	18.8305	37.5049	171.626
21	18	(France) Sébastien Bourdais	18.7006	18.8558	37.5564	171.390
22	4	(Brazil) Matheus Leist	19.0247	19.4876	38.5123	167.136
OFFICIAL BOX SCORE

=== Race ===
Pos	No.	Driver	Team	Engine	Laps	Time/Retired	Pit Stops	Grid	Laps Led	Pts.
1	2	(United States) Josef Newgarden W	Team Penske	Chevrolet	300	1:56:53.5753	5	3	245	53
2	9	(New Zealand) Scott Dixon	Chip Ganassi Racing	Honda	300	+2.8527	5	8	2	41
3	5	(Canada) James Hinchcliffe W	Arrow Schmidt Peterson Motorsports	Honda	300	+3.3941	5	5		35
4	22	(France) Simon Pagenaud	Team Penske	Chevrolet	300	+7.5630	5	1	2	34
5	21	(United States) Spencer Pigot	Ed Carpenter Racing	Chevrolet	300	+10.9683	6	19		30
6	27	(United States) Alexander Rossi	Andretti Autosport	Honda	300	+12.1308	6	6		28
7	26	(United States) Zach Veach	Andretti Autosport	Honda	300	+17.1267	6	20		26
8	15	(United States) Graham Rahal	Rahal Letterman Lanigan Racing	Honda	299	+1 lap	6	7		24
9	18	(France) Sébastien Bourdais	Dale Coyne Racing with Vasser-Sullivan	Honda	299	+1 lap	6	21	2	23
10	14	(Brazil) Tony Kanaan W	A. J. Foyt Enterprises	Chevrolet	299	+1 lap	6	13		20
11	7	(Sweden) Marcus Ericsson R	Arrow Schmidt Peterson Motorsports	Honda	299	+1 lap	7	10		19
12	19	(United States) Santino Ferrucci R	Dale Coyne Racing	Honda	299	+1 lap	6	12		18
13	59	(United States) Conor Daly	Carlin	Chevrolet	299	+1 lap	6	16		17
14	10	(Sweden) Felix Rosenqvist R	Chip Ganassi Racing	Honda	299	+1 lap	6	15		16
15	12	(Australia) Will Power	Team Penske	Chevrolet	299	+1 lap	7	2	49	16
16	4	(Brazil) Matheus Leist	A. J. Foyt Enterprises	Chevrolet	298	+2 laps	6	22		14
17	28	(United States) Ryan Hunter-Reay W	Andretti Autosport	Honda	298	+2 laps	6	9		13
18	88	(United States) Colton Herta R	Harding Steinbrenner Racing	Honda	276	Mechanical	7	11		12
19	20	(United States) Ed Carpenter	Ed Carpenter Racing	Chevrolet	262	Contact	5	17		11
20	30	(Japan) Takuma Sato	Rahal Letterman Lanigan Racing	Honda	216	Contact	5	4		10
21	98	(United States) Marco Andretti W	Andretti Herta Autosport with Marco Andretti & Curb-Agajanian	Honda	205	Handling	5	18		9
22	31	(United States) Sage Karam	Carlin	Chevrolet	193	Contact	4	14		8
OFFICIAL BOX SCORE

Notes: ^{1} Points include 1 point for leading at least 1 lap during a race, an additional 2 points for leading the most race laps, and 1 point for Pole Position.

== Championship standings after the race ==
Drivers' Championship standings

Pos	Driver	Points
1	(United States) Josef Newgarden	487
2	(United States) Alexander Rossi	458
3	(France) Simon Pagenaud	429
4	(New Zealand) Scott Dixon	389
5	(Australia) Will Power	322

Manufacturer standings

Pos	Manufacturer	Points
1	(United States) Chevrolet	1051
2	(Japan) Honda	1012

- Note: Only the top five positions are included.

Previous race: 2019 Honda Indy Toronto	IndyCar Series; 2019 season	Next race: 2019 Honda Indy 200
Previous race: 2018 Iowa Corn 300	Iowa 300	Next race: 2020 Iowa IndyCar 250s
