= 2019 REV Group Grand Prix at Road America =

(United States) 2019 Road America
Race details
10th round of the 2019 IndyCar season
← Previous race	Next race →
- Date: June 23, 2019
- Official name: REV Group Grand Prix at Road America
- Location: Road America
- Course: Permanent racing facility 4.048 mi / 6.458 km
- Distance: 55 laps 222.64 mi / 358.304 km

Pole position
- Driver: (United States) Colton Herta (Harding Steinbrenner Racing)
- Time: 1:42.9920

Fastest lap
- Driver: (United States) Colton Herta (Harding Steinbrenner Racing)
- Time: 1:45.0774 (on lap 30 of 55)

Podium
- First: (United States) Alexander Rossi (Andretti Autosport)
- Second: (Australia) Will Power (Team Penske)
- Third: (United States) Josef Newgarden (Team Penske)

The 2019 REV Group Grand Prix at Road America was an IndyCar Series event held at Road America in Elkhart Lake, Wisconsin. The race served as the 10th round of the 2019 IndyCar Series season. Colton Herta became the youngest ever driver to win an IndyCar pole. Alexander Rossi took the lead in the first two corners and proceeded to dominate the race, leading all but one lap and winning by over 28 seconds in the caution-free race. It was Rossi's last win until the 2022 Gallagher Grand Prix

== Results ==
Key	Meaning
R	Rookie
W	Past winner

=== Qualifying ===
Pos	No.	Name	Grp.	Round 1	Round 2	Firestone Fast 6
1	88	(United States) Colton Herta R	1	1:42.4555	1:42.6546	1:42.9920
2	27	(United States) Alexander Rossi	2	1:42.4586	1:42.8437	1:43.1693
3	12	(Australia) Will Power W	2	1:42.9432	1:43.1357	1:43.3749
4	2	(United States) Josef Newgarden W	2	1:43.1285	1:43.0069	1:43.6036
5	15	(United States) Graham Rahal	1	1:43.3877	1:43.2373	1:43.8076
6	30	(Japan) Takuma Sato	1	1:43.1804	1:43.2292	1:43.8790
7	18	(France) Sébastien Bourdais	1	1:43.3078	1:43.2989	
8	21	(United States) Spencer Pigot	1	1:43.2338	1:43.3083	
9	5	(Canada) James Hinchcliffe	2	1:43.4428	1:43.3814	
10	98	(United States) Marco Andretti	2	1:43.4452	1:43.3945	
11	20	(United Arab Emirates) Ed Jones	2	1:43.2421	1:43.5162	
12	9	(New Zealand) Scott Dixon W	2	1:43.3634	NO TIME	
13	31	(Mexico) Patricio O'Ward R	1	1:43.6061		
14	26	(United States) Zach Veach	2	1:43.4488		
15	28	(United States) Ryan Hunter-Reay	1	1:43.6980		
16	22	(France) Simon Pagenaud	2	1:43.4764		
17	7	(Sweden) Marcus Ericsson R	1	1:43.8913		
18	10	(Sweden) Felix Rosenqvist R	2	1:43.5038		
19	32	(United Kingdom) Jack Harvey	1	1:44.6179		
20	4	(Brazil) Matheus Leist	2	1:43.8570		
21	19	(United States) Santino Ferrucci R	1	1:49.3060		
22	59	(United Kingdom) Max Chilton	2	1:43.8745		
23	14	(Brazil) Tony Kanaan	1	1:44.4183		
OFFICIAL BOX SCORE

=== Race ===
Pos	No.	Driver	Team	Engine	Laps	Time/Retired	Pit Stops	Grid	Laps Led	Pts.
1	27	(United States) Alexander Rossi	Andretti Autosport	Honda	55	1:39:40.4743	3	2	54	53
2	12	(Australia) Will Power W	Team Penske	Chevrolet	55	+28.4391	3	3		40
3	2	(United States) Josef Newgarden W	Team Penske	Chevrolet	55	+31.8443	3	4		35
4	15	(United States) Graham Rahal	Rahal Letterman Lanigan Racing	Honda	55	+33.4094	3	5	1	33
5	9	(New Zealand) Scott Dixon W	Chip Ganassi Racing	Honda	55	+39.1173	3	12		30
6	10	(Sweden) Felix Rosenqvist R	Chip Ganassi Racing	Honda	55	+41.7825	3	18		28
7	5	(Canada) James Hinchcliffe	Arrow Schmidt Peterson Motorsports	Honda	55	+45.5520	3	9		26
8	88	(United States) Colton Herta R	Harding Steinbrenner Racing	Honda	55	+47.6935	3	1		25
9	22	(France) Simon Pagenaud	Team Penske	Chevrolet	55	+53.8945	3	16		22
10	30	(Japan) Takuma Sato	Rahal Letterman Lanigan Racing	Honda	55	+58.9047	3	6		20
11	28	(United States) Ryan Hunter-Reay	Andretti Autosport	Honda	55	+1:01.0878	3	15		19
12	18	(France) Sébastien Bourdais	Dale Coyne Racing with Vasser-Sullivan	Honda	55	+1:03.9724	3	7		18
13	7	(Sweden) Marcus Ericsson R	Arrow Schmidt Peterson Motorsports	Honda	55	+1:17.7859	3	17		17
14	21	(United States) Spencer Pigot	Ed Carpenter Racing	Chevrolet	55	+1:19.6032	3	8		16
15	60	(United Kingdom) Jack Harvey	Meyer Shank Racing with Arrow Schmidt Peterson	Honda	55	+1:42.2456	3	19		15
16	59	(United Kingdom) Max Chilton	Carlin	Chevrolet	55	+1:46.5309	3	22		14
17	31	(Mexico) Patricio O'Ward R	Carlin	Chevrolet	54	+1 Lap	3	13		13
18	26	(United States) Zach Veach	Andretti Autosport	Honda	54	+1 Lap	3	14		12
19	19	(United States) Santino Ferrucci R	Dale Coyne Racing	Honda	54	+1 Lap	4	21		11
20	4	(Brazil) Matheus Leist	A. J. Foyt Enterprises	Chevrolet	54	+1 Lap	4	20		10
21	14	(Brazil) Tony Kanaan	A. J. Foyt Enterprises	Chevrolet	54	+1 Lap	4	23		9
22	20	(United Arab Emirates) Ed Jones	Ed Carpenter Racing	Chevrolet	54	+1 Lap	3	11		8
23	98	(United States) Marco Andretti	Andretti Herta Autosport with Marco Andretti & Curb-Agajanian	Honda	18	Mechanical	3	10		7
OFFICIAL BOX SCORE

Notes: ^{1} Points include 1 point for leading at least 1 lap during a race, an additional 2 points for leading the most race laps, and 1 point for Pole Position.

== Championship standings after the race ==
Drivers' Championship standings

Pos	Driver	Points
1	(United States) Josef Newgarden	402
2	(United States) Alexander Rossi	395
3	(France) Simon Pagenaud	341
4	(New Zealand) Scott Dixon	308
5	(Australia) Will Power	294

Manufacturer standings

Pos	Manufacturer	Points
1	(Japan) Honda	826
2	(United States) Chevrolet	754

- Note: Only the top five positions are included.

Previous race: 2019 DXC Technology 600	IndyCar Series; 2019 season	Next race: 2019 Honda Indy Toronto
Previous race: 2018 Kohler Grand Prix	REV Group Grand Prix at Road America	Next race: 2020 REV Group Grand Prix
