= 2019 Bommarito Automotive Group 500 =

(United States) 2019 Bommarito Automotive Group 500
Race details
15th round of the 2019 IndyCar season
← Previous race	Next race →
- Date: August 24, 2019
- Official name: Bommarito Automotive Group 500
- Location: World Wide Technology Raceway
- Course: Permanent racing facility 1.25 mi / 2.012 km
- Distance: 248 laps 310 mi / 498.9 km

Pole position
- Driver: (United States) Josef Newgarden (Team Penske)
- Time: 24.1145 + 24.1409 = 48.2554

Fastest lap
- Driver: (United States) Josef Newgarden (Team Penske)
- Time: 24.9164 (on lap 10 of 248)

Podium
- First: (Japan) Takuma Sato (Rahal Letterman Lanigan Racing)
- Second: (United States) Ed Carpenter (Ed Carpenter Racing)
- Third: (Brazil) Tony Kanaan (A. J. Foyt Enterprises)

The 2019 Bommarito Automotive Group 500 was the fifteenth round of the 2019 IndyCar Series season, contested over 248 laps at the 1.25-mile (2 km) World Wide Technology Raceway in Madison, Illinois. Pole position was won by Josef Newgarden, his third pole of the season. Takuma Sato would go on to win the race, his 2nd win of the season and 5th of his career.

== Results ==
Key	Meaning
R	Rookie
W	Past winner

=== Qualifying ===
Pos	No.	Name	Lap 1 Time	Lap 2 Time	Total Time	Avg. Speed (mph)
1	2	(United States) Josef Newgarden W	24.1145	24.1409	48.2554	186.508
2	18	(France) Sébastien Bourdais	24.2235	24.1827	48.4062	185.927
3	12	(Australia) Will Power W	24.1738	24.2404	48.4142	185.896
4	22	(France) Simon Pagenaud	24.3341	24.2769	48.6110	185.143
5	30	(Japan) Takuma Sato	24.2947	24.3409	48.6356	185.050
6	19	(United States) Santino Ferrucci R	24.3856	24.3078	48.6934	184.830
7	5	(Canada) James Hinchcliffe	24.3912	24.4019	48.7931	184.452
8	9	(New Zealand) Scott Dixon	24.5371	24.2983	48.8354	184.293
9	28	(United States) Ryan Hunter-Reay	24.4660	24.3924	48.8584	184.206
10	10	(Sweden) Felix Rosenqvist R	24.4657	24.4128	48.8785	184.130
11	27	(United States) Alexander Rossi	24.4810	24.4135	48.8945	184.070
12	88	(United States) Colton Herta R	24.5274	24.5458	49.0732	183.399
13	21	(United States) Spencer Pigot	24.5837	24.5399	49.1236	183.211
14	7	(Sweden) Marcus Ericsson R	24.6606	24.4713	49.1319	183.180
15	26	(United States) Zach Veach	24.6171	24.6854	49.3025	182.547
16	15	(United States) Graham Rahal	24.7810	24.6518	49.4328	182.065
17	20	(United States) Ed Carpenter	24.7471	24.8850	49.6321	181.334
18	59	(United States) Conor Daly	25.0716	25.0958	50.1674	179.399
19	23	(United States) Charlie Kimball	25.1346	25.1498	50.2844	178.982
20	14	(Brazil) Tony Kanaan	25.1229	25.1637	50.2866	178.974
21	4	(Brazil) Matheus Leist	25.3319	25.1476	50.4795	178.290
22	98	(United States) Marco Andretti	26.1451	25.2271	51.3722	175.192
OFFICIAL BOX SCORE

=== Race ===
Pos	No.	Driver	Team	Engine	Laps	Time/Retired	Pit Stops	Grid	Laps Led	Pts.^{1}
1	30	(Japan) Takuma Sato	Rahal Letterman Lanigan Racing	Honda	248	2:15:53.4687	4	5	61	51
2	20	(United States) Ed Carpenter	Ed Carpenter Racing	Chevrolet	248	+0.0399	4	17		40
3	14	(Brazil) Tony Kanaan	A. J. Foyt Enterprises	Chevrolet	248	+2.2459	5	20		35
4	19	(United States) Santino Ferrucci R	Dale Coyne Racing	Honda	248	+4.1935	3	6	97	35
5	22	(France) Simon Pagenaud	Team Penske	Chevrolet	248	+6.2741	4	4		30
6	59	(United States) Conor Daly	Carlin	Chevrolet	248	+8.0200	3	18	1	29
7	2	(United States) Josef Newgarden W	Team Penske	Chevrolet	248	+13.8050	4	1	50	28
8	28	(United States) Ryan Hunter-Reay	Andretti Autosport	Honda	248	+14.9394	4	9		24
9	88	(United States) Colton Herta R	Harding Steinbrenner Racing	Honda	248	+17.1010	4	12	10	23
10	98	(United States) Marco Andretti	Andretti Herta Autosport with Marco Andretti & Curb-Agajanian	Honda	248	+18.4657	3	22	4	21
11	10	(Sweden) Felix Rosenqvist R	Chip Ganassi Racing	Honda	248	+19.8590	4	10	1	20
12	5	(Canada) James Hinchcliffe	Arrow Schmidt Peterson Motorsports	Honda	247	+1 lap	4	7	20	19
13	27	(United States) Alexander Rossi	Andretti Autosport	Honda	247	+1 lap	4	11		17
14	26	(United States) Zach Veach	Andretti Autosport	Honda	247	+1 lap	4	15		16
15	23	(United States) Charlie Kimball	Carlin	Chevrolet	247	+1 lap	6	19		15
16	7	(Sweden) Marcus Ericsson R	Arrow Schmidt Peterson Motorsports	Honda	247	+1 lap	6	14	2	15
17	4	(Brazil) Matheus Leist	A. J. Foyt Enterprises	Chevrolet	246	+2 laps	4	21		13
18	15	(United States) Graham Rahal	Rahal Letterman Lanigan Racing	Honda	226	Mechanical	4	16		12
19	18	(France) Sébastien Bourdais	Dale Coyne Racing with Vasser-Sullivan	Honda	189	Contact	3	2	1	12
20	9	(New Zealand) Scott Dixon	Chip Ganassi Racing	Honda	136	Mechanical	4	8		10
21	21	(United States) Spencer Pigot	Ed Carpenter Racing	Chevrolet	131	Contact	3	13		9
22	12	(Australia) Will Power W	Team Penske	Chevrolet	52	Contact	1	3	1	9
OFFICIAL BOX SCORE

Notes: ^{1} Points include 1 point for leading at least 1 lap during a race, an additional 2 points for leading the most race laps, and 1 point for Pole Position.

== Championship standings after the race ==
Drivers' Championship standings

	Pos	Driver	Points
	1	(United States) Josef Newgarden	563
1	2	(France) Simon Pagenaud	525
1	3	(United States) Alexander Rossi	517
	4	(New Zealand) Scott Dixon	493
	5	(Australia) Will Power	416

Manufacturer standings

Pos	Manufacturer	Points
1	(Japan) Honda	1226
2	(United States) Chevrolet	1145

- Note: Only the top five positions are included.

Previous race: 2019 ABC Supply 500	IndyCar Series; 2019 season	Next race: 2019 Grand Prix of Portland
Previous race: 2018 Bommarito Automotive Group 500	Bommarito Automotive Group 500	Next race: 2020 Bommarito Automotive Group 500
