= Ed Carpenter Racing =

American auto racing team

(United States) Ed Carpenter Racing
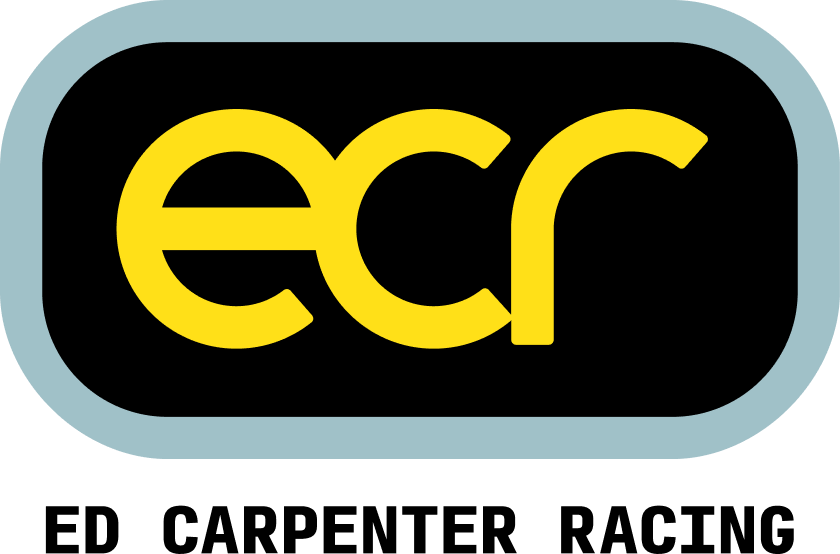
- Owner(s): Ed Carpenter; Ted Gelov; Tony George; Stuart Reed
- Principal(s): Ted Gelov (chairman); Tim Broyles
- Base: Indianapolis, Indiana
- Series: IndyCar Series; Indy NXT
- Race drivers: IndyCar Series; 20. (United States) Alexander Rossi; 21. (Denmark) Christian Rasmussen; 33. (United States) Ed Carpenter (part-time); Indy NXT; 20. TBA; 21. (United States) Bryce Aron
- Manufacturer: Chevrolet
- Opened: 2011

Career
- Debut: 2012 Honda Grand Prix of St. Petersburg
- Drivers' Championships: Indy NXT: 2026: Nikita Johnson
- Indy 500 victories: 0
- Race victories: 7

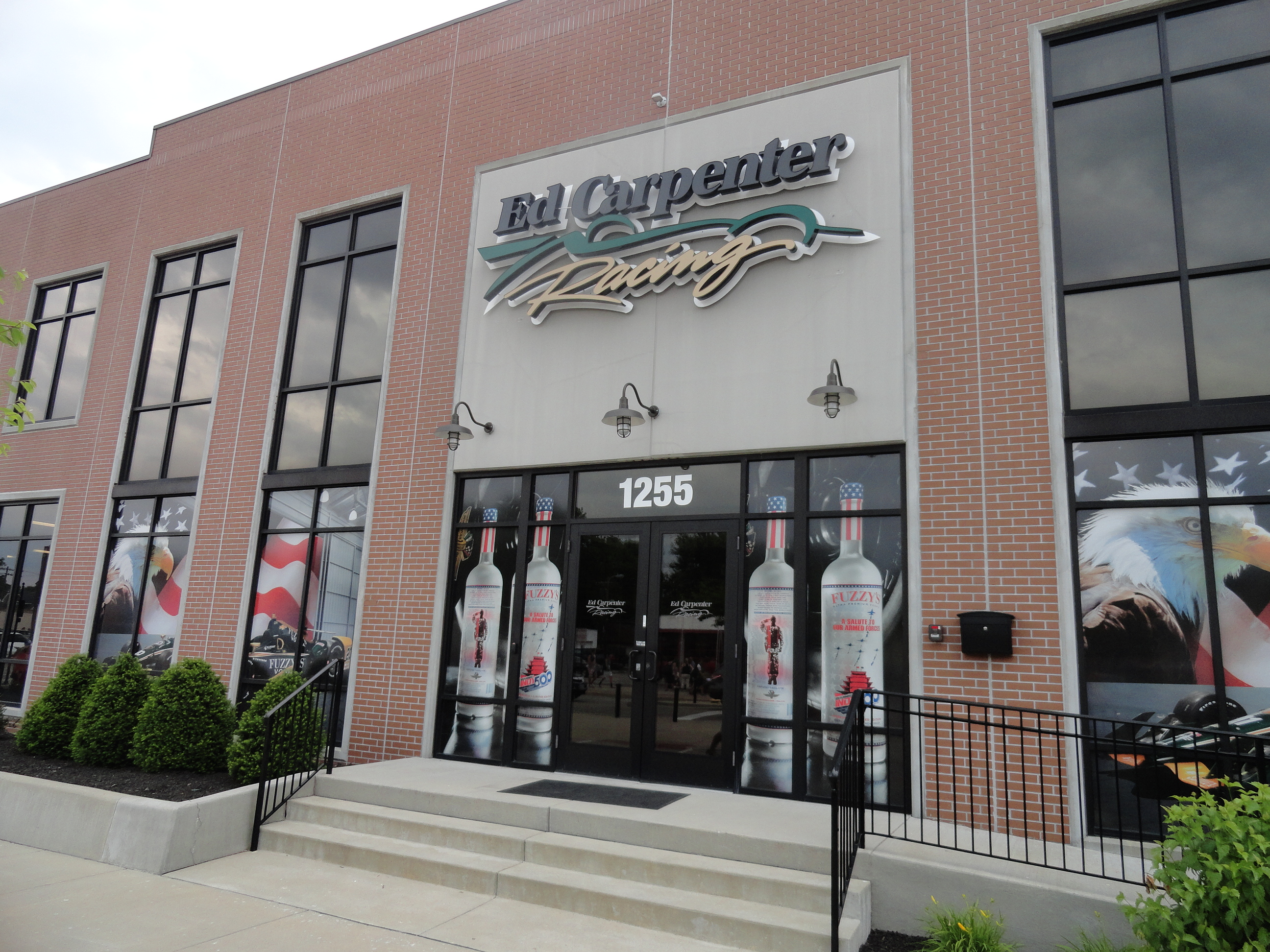
Ed Carpenter Racing headquarters in Indianapolis, Indiana

Ed Carpenter Racing, competing as ECR, is an American racing team that currently competes in the IndyCar Series and also with Cape Motorsports in Indy NXT. The team is owned by driver Ed Carpenter. The team is based in Indianapolis, Indiana, and currently fields the No. 20 Dallara-Chevrolet for Alexander Rossi, the No. 21 Dallara-Chevrolet for Christian Rasmussen and the No. 33 Dallara-Chevrolet for Ed Carpenter. In 2015, the team merged with Sarah Fisher Hartman Racing to form CFH Racing, but became ECR again in 2016.

== History ==
Logo from 2011–2024

After spending five seasons with Vision Racing, and the 2011 IndyCar Series season with Sarah Fisher Hartman Racing, on November 2, 2011, Ed Carpenter announced the creation of Ed Carpenter Racing, which ran its first season in 2012 with sponsorship by Fuzzy's Premium Vodka for three seasons. Among the reasons for the team's creation was concerns surrounding the departure of Sarah Fisher Racing's sponsor Dollar General. IRL founder and Carpenter's stepfather Tony George also became an owner, along with former golfer Fuzzy Zoeller. American Le Mans Series team owner and former Penske Racing member Derrick Walker was hired as general manager; Tim Broyles and Bret Schmitt were hired as team manager and crew chief, respectively.

On February 13, 2012, it was confirmed that the team will run with engines from Chevrolet. Carpenter stated that he was intending to run a full season, unlike in previous seasons, where he ran the ovals, and had also decided to drive with #20, the number he drove with during his tenure at Vision Racing. The team claimed its first victory with Carpenter winning the season-ending MAVTV 500 at Auto Club Speedway, and ECR became the only one-driver team to win a race in 2012. In 2013, Walker left for a position with IndyCar. Eventually, Carpenter scored the pole position for the Indianapolis 500. He finished the season sixteenth in points, with a best result of second at the final race at Auto Club Speedway.

For the 2014 season, Carpenter competed in the oval races on the calendar, while Mike Conway competed for the team on road and street courses. On March 20, J. R. Hildebrand was hired to run the 2014 Indianapolis 500 with the team in the No. 21. The move to a shared drive paid off well for the team early in the year, with Conway winning the 40th Toyota Grand Prix of Long Beach, and Carpenter winning the Indy 500 pole for the second consecutive year. Carpenter's four lap average of 231.067 mph was the first Indy pole-claiming run in excess of 230 mph for 11 years. Unfortunately, he was involved in a crash with James Hinchcliffe on a late restart, finishing 27th. Later in the season, Carpenter won the Firestone 600 at Texas Motor Speedway, his first win since the 2012 triumph at Fontana.

On August 16, 2014, Carpenter announced the team would merge with Sarah Fisher Hartman Racing for the 2015 season, becoming CFH Racing. After one season, Hartman and Fisher left the sport and CFH was rebranded to Ed Carpenter Racing.

On June 2, 2016, the team announced that 2015 Indy Lights champion Spencer Pigot would drive in the No. 20 car in all remaining road and street circuit events. The arrangement was similar to Mike Conway's during the 2014 season. On June 12, 2016, Josef Newgarden sustained a fractured clavicle and wrist in an accident during the Firestone 600. The team announced the following day that J. R. Hildebrand would fill in for Newgarden until he recovered from his injuries. However, Newgarden was able to recover enough from his injuries to not miss any races.

For the 2017 season, Carpenter and Pigot remained with the team with the same agreement as the previous season. However, with the full-time entry vacated by Newgarden's departure to Team Penske, the team hired J. R. Hildebrand as the new full-time driver. During the second race of the season at Long Beach, Hildebrand suffered a broken bone in his left hand. As a result, he was forced to sit out the next race. The team hired Indy Lights driver Zach Veach to fill in for Hildebrand while he recovered from his injuries.

On March 7, 2018, it was announced that Danica Patrick would drive a third car for the team in her final Indianapolis 500 appearance.

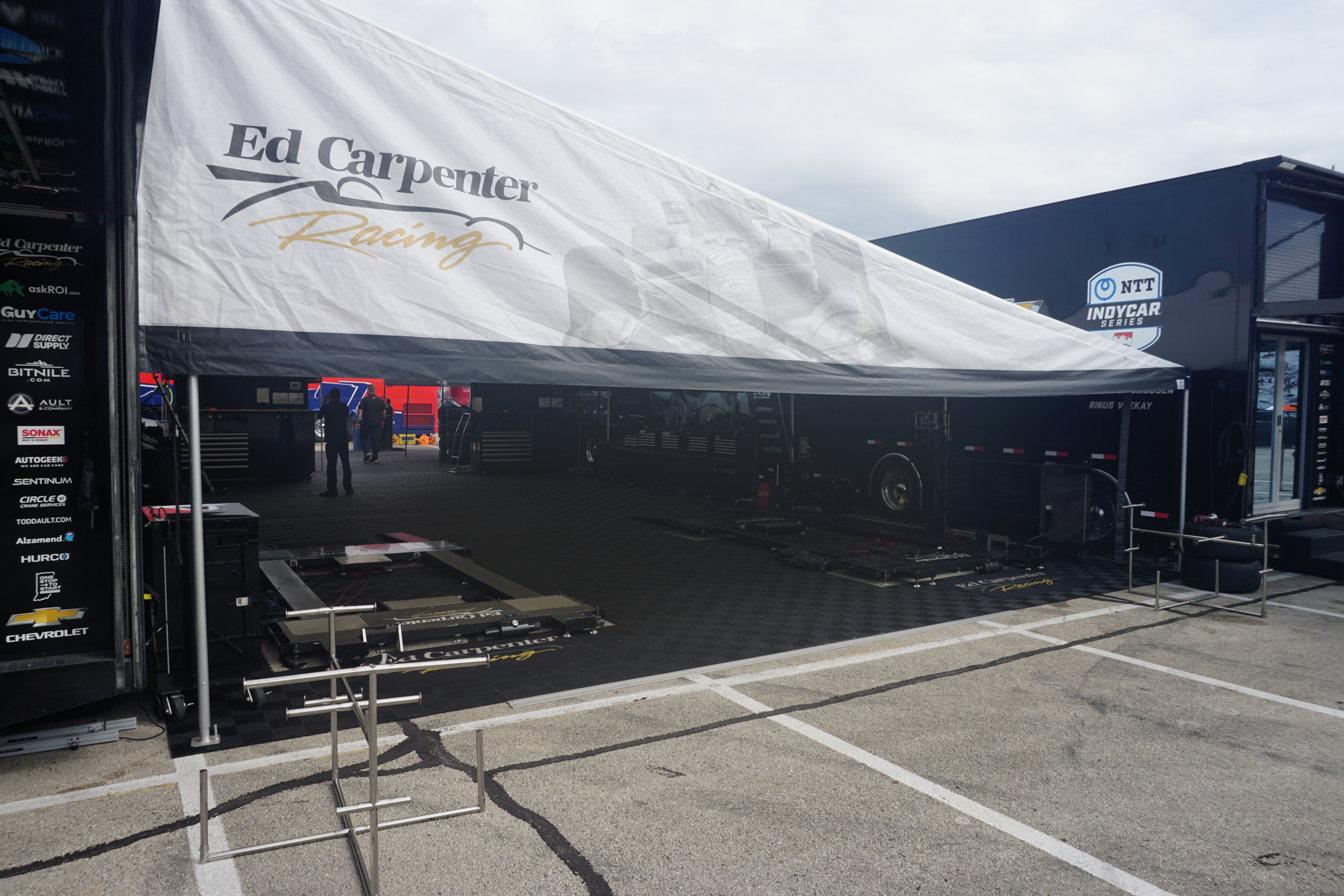
Ed Carpenter Racing garage at the 2024 Hy-Vee Milwaukee Mile 250s

== Racing results ==
=== Complete IndyCar Series results ===
(key)

Year	Chassis	Engine	Drivers	No.	1	2	3	4	5	6	7	8	9	10	11	12	13	14	15	16	17	18	19	Pos	Pts
2012					STP	ALA	LBH	SAO	INDY	DET	TEX	MIL	IOW	TOR	EDM	MDO	SNM	BAL	FON						
2012	Dallara DW12	Chevrolet IndyCar V6t	(United States) Ed Carpenter	20	18	22	14	21	21	12	12	8	8	18	22	22	20	25	1*					18th	261
2013					STP	ALA	LBH	SAO	INDY	DET		TXS	MIL	IOW	POC	TOR		MDO	SNM	BAL	HOU		FON		
2013	Dallara DW12	Chevrolet IndyCar V6t	(United States) Ed Carpenter	20	14	22	18	23	10*	18	15	4	14	4	9	13	22	20	19	14	23	22	2	16th	333
2014					STP	LBH	ALA	IMS	INDY	DET		TXS	HOU		POC	IOW	TOR		MDO	MIL	SNM	FON			
2014	Dallara DW12	Chevrolet IndyCar V6t	(United Kingdom) Mike Conway	20	16	1	14	19		21	11		17	13			15	1	13		14			23rd	252
2014	Dallara DW12	Chevrolet IndyCar V6t	(United States) Ed Carpenter	20					27			1			13	5				9		3		22nd	262
2014	Dallara DW12	Chevrolet IndyCar V6t	(United States) J. R. Hildebrand	21					10															26th	66
2016					STP	PHX	LBH	ALA	IMS	INDY	DET		ROA	IOW	TOR	MDO	POC	TXS	WGL	SNM					
2016	Dallara DW12	Chevrolet IndyCar V6t	(United States) J. R. Hildebrand	6					22	6														23rd	84
2016	Dallara DW12	Chevrolet IndyCar V6t	(United States) Ed Carpenter	20		21				31				18			21	18						25th	67
2016	Dallara DW12	Chevrolet IndyCar V6t	(United States) Spencer Pigot (R)	20							17	18	9		19	7			15	22				21st	165
2016	Dallara DW12	Chevrolet IndyCar V6t	(United States) Josef Newgarden	21	22	6	10	3	21	3	14	4	8	1*	22	10	4	22	2	6				4th	502
2017					STP	LBH	ALA	PHX	IMS	INDY	DET		TXS	ROA	IOW	TOR	MDO	POC	GAT	WGL	SNM				
2017	Dallara DW12	Chevrolet IndyCar V6t	(United States) Spencer Pigot	20	20	8	20		9		10	21		12		18	19			12	13			20th	218
2017	Dallara DW12	Chevrolet IndyCar V6t	(United States) Ed Carpenter	20				7		11			11		12			12	21					22nd	169
2017	Dallara DW12	Chevrolet IndyCar V6t	(United States) J. R. Hildebrand	21	13	11		3	14	16	17	18	12	16	2	13	17	19	18	15	14			15th	347
2017	Dallara DW12	Chevrolet IndyCar V6t	(United States) Zach Veach (R)	21			19																	33rd	23
2018					STP	PHX	LBH	ALA	IMS	INDY	DET		TXS	ROA	IOW	TOR	MDO	POC	GAT	POR	SNM				
2018	Dallara DW12	Chevrolet IndyCar V6t	(United States) Danica Patrick	13						30														38th	13
2018	Dallara DW12	Chevrolet IndyCar V6t	(United Kingdom) Jordan King (R)	20	21		18	14	24		16	18		12		11	12			15	13			22nd	175
2018	Dallara DW12	Chevrolet IndyCar V6t	(United States) Ed Carpenter	20		7				2*			20		10			10	12					21st	187
2018	Dallara DW12	Chevrolet IndyCar V6t	(United States) Spencer Pigot	21	15	14	15	15	15	20	10	23	11	8	2	20	13	16	6	4	24			14th	325
2019					STP	COA	ALA	LBH	IMS	INDY	DET		TXS	ROA	TOR	IOW	MDO	POC	GAT	POR	LAG				
2019	Dallara DW12	Chevrolet IndyCar V6t	(United Arab Emirates) Ed Jones^{1}	63						13														20th	217
2019	Dallara DW12	Chevrolet IndyCar V6t	(United Arab Emirates) Ed Jones^{1}	20	21	14	19	16	6		20	14		22	12		13			14	23			20th	217
2019	Dallara DW12	Chevrolet IndyCar V6t	(United States) Ed Carpenter	20						6			13			19		6	2					23rd	161
2019	Dallara DW12	Chevrolet IndyCar V6t	(United States) Spencer Pigot	21	11	11	17	18	5	14	10	21	14	14	15	5	7	17	21	6	20			14th	335
2020					TXS	IMS	ROA		IOW		INDY	GAT		MDO		IMS		STP							
2020	Dallara DW12	Chevrolet IndyCar V6t	(United States) Ed Carpenter	20	5				15	23	26	20	21											25th	81
2020	Dallara DW12	Chevrolet IndyCar V6t	(United States) Conor Daly	20		12	21	18						13	16	12	20	17						17th	237
2020	Dallara DW12	Chevrolet IndyCar V6t	(United States) Conor Daly	47							29													17th	237
2020	Dallara DW12	Chevrolet IndyCar V6t	(Netherlands) Rinus VeeKay R	21	22	5	13	14	20	17	20	6	4	8	11	3	17	15						14th	289
2021					ALA	STP	TXS		IMS	INDY	DET		ROA	MDO	NSH	IMS	GAT	POR	LAG	LBH					
2021	Dallara DW12	Chevrolet IndyCar V6t	(United States) Conor Daly	47						13														18th	235
2021	Dallara DW12	Chevrolet IndyCar V6t	(United States) Conor Daly	20	16	16			25		13	15	20	15	12	11		16	16	21				18th	235
2021	Dallara DW12	Chevrolet IndyCar V6t	(United States) Ed Carpenter	20			17	11		5							22							27th	107
2021	Dallara DW12	Chevrolet IndyCar V6t	(Netherlands) Rinus VeeKay	21	6	9	20	9	1	8	2	18		16	24	24	21	17	18	25				12th	308
2021	Dallara DW12	Chevrolet IndyCar V6t	(United States) Oliver Askew	21									12											29th	61
2022					STP	TXS	LBH	ALA	IMS	INDY	DET	ROA	MDO	TOR	IOW		IMS	NSH	GAT	POR	LAG				
2022	Dallara DW12	Chevrolet IndyCar V6t	(United States) Conor Daly	20	21	18	12	19	5	6	12	14	13	20	19	16	17	17	23	25	24			17th	267
2022	Dallara DW12	Chevrolet IndyCar V6t	(Netherlands) Rinus VeeKay	21	6	10	13	3	23	33	16	17	4	13	4	19	6	12	26	20	14			12th	331
2022	Dallara DW12	Chevrolet IndyCar V6t	(United States) Ed Carpenter	33		13				19					25	17			22					27th	75
2023					STP	TXS	LBH	ALA	IMS	INDY	DET	ROA	MDO	TOR	IOW		NSH	IMS	GAT	POR	LAG				
2023	Dallara DW12	Chevrolet IndyCar V6t	(United States) Conor Daly	20	14	20	23	25	19	8	15													25th	134
2023	Dallara DW12	Chevrolet IndyCar V6t	(United States) Ryan Hunter-Reay	20								17	19	26	23	24	16	20	14	21	10			26th	131
2023	Dallara DW12	Chevrolet IndyCar V6t	(Netherlands) Rinus VeeKay	21	21	11	26	16	13	10	18	12	15	13	17	18	14	11	11	6	18			14th	277
2023	Dallara DW12	Chevrolet IndyCar V6t	(United States) Ed Carpenter	33		13				20					24	23			24					30th	46
2024					STP	THE^{2}	LBH	ALA	IMS	INDY	DET	ROA	LAG	MDO	IOW		TOR	GAT	POR	MIL		NSH			
2024	Dallara DW12	Chevrolet IndyCar V6t	(Denmark) Christian Rasmussen R	33						12														22nd	163
2024	Dallara DW12	Chevrolet IndyCar V6t	(Denmark) Christian Rasmussen R	20	21	DNQ	27	24	20		27	20	13	9			27		26	11	16	14		22nd	163
2024	Dallara DW12	Chevrolet IndyCar V6t	(United States) Ed Carpenter	20						17					20	22		17						32nd	45
2024	Dallara DW12	Chevrolet IndyCar V6t	(Netherlands) Rinus VeeKay	21	10	DNQ	14	17	26	9	14	24	26	19	5	9	8	10	11	14	7	12		13th	300
2025					STP	THE	LBH	ALA	IMS	INDY	DET	GAT	ROA	MDO	IOW		TOR	LAG	POR	MIL	NSH				
2025	Dallara DW12	Chevrolet IndyCar V6t	(United States) Alexander Rossi	20	10	9	15	8	14	28	10	11	13	15	25	17	25	15	5	4	10			15th	297
2025	Dallara DW12	Chevrolet IndyCar V6t	(Denmark) Christian Rasmussen	21	15	12	23	15	19	6	24	3	18	25	6	8	20	9	12	1	27			13th	313
2025	Dallara DW12	Chevrolet IndyCar V6t	(United States) Ed Carpenter	33						15														30th	16
2026					STP	PHX	ARL	ALA	LBH	IMS	INDY	DET	GAT	ROA	MOH	NSH	POR	MAR	D.C.	MIL		LAG			
2026	Dallara DW12	Chevrolet IndyCar V6t	(United States) Alexander Rossi	20	16	6	9	11	9	25	30	17	18	6	20	23	19	20	12	14	11	3		15th	307
2026	Dallara DW12	Chevrolet IndyCar V6t	(Denmark) Christian Rasmussen	21	19	14	25	19	15	24	27	25	3	25	7	22	24	23	14	5	8	21		21st	245
2026	Dallara DW12	Chevrolet IndyCar V6t	(United States) Ed Carpenter	33							31													31st	5

* Season still in progress

1. In conjunction with Scuderia Corsa
2. Non-points paying exhibition event

== IndyCar wins ==
#	Season	Date	Sanction	Track / Race	No.	Winning driver	Chassis	Engine	Tire	Grid	Laps Led
1	2012	September 15	IndyCar	Auto Club Speedway (O)	20	(United States) Ed Carpenter	Dallara DW12	Chevrolet IndyCar V6t	Firestone	5	62
2	2014	April 13	IndyCar	Streets of Long Beach (S)	20	(United Kingdom) Mike Conway	Dallara DW12	Chevrolet IndyCar V6t	Firestone	17	3
3	2014	June 7	IndyCar	Texas Motor Speedway (O)	20	(United States) Ed Carpenter (2)	Dallara DW12	Chevrolet IndyCar V6t	Firestone	5	90
4	2014	July 20	IndyCar	Exhibition Place (S)	20	(United Kingdom) Mike Conway (2)	Dallara DW12	Chevrolet IndyCar V6t	Firestone	11	7
5	2016	July 10	IndyCar	Iowa Speedway (O)	21	(United States) Josef Newgarden	Dallara DW12	Chevrolet IndyCar V6t	Firestone	2	282
6	2021	May 15	IndyCar	Indianapolis Motor Speedway (R)	21	(Netherlands) Rinus VeeKay	Dallara DW12	Chevrolet IndyCar V6t	Firestone	7	33
7	2025	August 24	IndyCar	Milwaukee Mile (O)	21	(Denmark) Christian Rasmussen	Dallara DW12	Chevrolet IndyCar V6t	Firestone	9	16

- Note: this does not include two wins achieved in 2015 as CFH Racing.
