= 2018 Honda Indy Grand Prix of Alabama =

(United States) 2018 Alabama
Race details
4th round of the 2018 IndyCar Series season
← Previous race	Next race →
- Date: April 22–23, 2018
- Official name: Honda Indy Grand Prix of Alabama
- Location: Barber Motorsports Park
- Course: Permanent racing facility 2.380 mi / 3.830 km
- Distance: 82 laps 195.160 mi / 314.080 km

Pole position
- Driver: (United States) Josef Newgarden (Team Penske)
- Time: 1:07.4413

Fastest lap
- Driver: (Australia) Zachary Claman DeMelo (Dale Coyne Racing)
- Time: 1:09.8183 (on lap 54 of 82)

Podium
- First: (United States) Josef Newgarden (Team Penske)
- Second: (United States) Ryan Hunter-Reay (Andretti Autosport)
- Third: (Canada) James Hinchcliffe (Schmidt Peterson Motorsports)

The 2018 Honda Indy Grand Prix of Alabama was the fourth round of the 2018 IndyCar Series season contested at Barber Motorsports Park in Birmingham, Alabama. The race started on April 22 and was stopped due to rain on lap 23. It was resumed on Monday, April 23 at 11:30 am as a timed race which went 82 laps out of a scheduled 90. American Josef Newgarden qualified on pole for the event. He eventually took victory for his third IndyCar win in Alabama.

== Results ==
Key	Meaning
R	Rookie
W	Past winner

=== Qualifying ===
Pos	No.	Name	Grp.	Round 1	Round 2	Firestone Fast 6
1	1	(United States) Josef Newgarden W	1	1:07.5643	1:07.0583	1:07.4413
2	12	(Australia) Will Power W	2	1:08.1087	1:07.2628	1:07.4541
3	18	(France) Sébastien Bourdais	2	1:08.2597	1:07.5435	1:07.5337
4	28	(United States) Ryan Hunter-Reay W	1	1:07.5665	1:07.5323	1:07.7807
5	5	(Canada) James Hinchcliffe	1	1:07.5669	1:07.3797	1:07.7807
6	9	(New Zealand) Scott Dixon	2	1:08.4262	1:07.4595	1:08.0303
7	98	(United States) Marco Andretti	1	1:07.7832	1:07.6027	
8	27	(United States) Alexander Rossi	2	1:08.3649	1:07.7488	
9	22	(France) Simon Pagenaud W	2	1:08.4089	1:07.8409	
10	6	(Canada) Robert Wickens R	1	1:07.7610	1:07.8455	
11	26	(United States) Zach Veach R	2	1:08.2785	1:07.9894	
12	10	(United Arab Emirates) Ed Jones	1	1:07.9193	1:08.4386	
13	59	(United Kingdom) Max Chilton	1	1:08.0235		
14	23	(United States) Charlie Kimball	2	1:08.5494		
15	15	(United States) Graham Rahal	1	1:08.1038		
16	19	(Canada) Zachary Claman DeMelo R	2	1:08.5531		
17	21	(United States) Spencer Pigot	1	1:08.1184		
18	30	(Japan) Takuma Sato	2	1:08.5676		
19	20	(United Kingdom) Jordan King R	1	1:08.3997		
20	88	(Colombia) Gabby Chaves	2	1:08.9763		
21	4	(Brazil) Matheus Leist R	1	1:08.5516		
22	32	(Austria) René Binder R	2	1:09.5404		
23	14	(Brazil) Tony Kanaan	2	1:11.2015		
OFFICIAL BOX SCORE

=== Race ===
Pos	No.	Driver	Team	Engine	Laps	Time/Retired	Pit Stops	Grid	Laps Led	Pts.^{1}
1	1	(United States) Josef Newgarden W	Team Penske	Chevrolet	82	2:01:14.4486	4	1	73	54
2	28	(United States) Ryan Hunter-Reay W	Andretti Autosport	Honda	82	+9.9607	4	4		40
3	5	(Canada) James Hinchcliffe	Schmidt Peterson Motorsports	Honda	82	+15.5389	4	5		35
4	6	(Canada) Robert Wickens R	Schmidt Peterson Motorsports	Honda	82	+17.6794	4	10		32
5	18	(France) Sébastien Bourdais	Dale Coyne Racing with Vasser-Sullivan	Honda	82	+26.8897	4	3	9	31
6	9	(New Zealand) Scott Dixon	Chip Ganassi Racing	Honda	82	+26.9768	4	6		28
7	15	(United States) Graham Rahal	Rahal Letterman Lanigan Racing	Honda	82	+30.1194	4	15		26
8	30	(Japan) Takuma Sato	Rahal Letterman Lanigan Racing	Honda	82	+30.5526	4	18		24
9	22	(France) Simon Pagenaud W	Team Penske	Chevrolet	82	+42.4618	5	9		22
10	98	(United States) Marco Andretti	Andretti Herta Autosport with Curb-Agajanian	Honda	82	+44.6892	6	7		20
11	27	(United States) Alexander Rossi	Andretti Autosport	Honda	82	+45.2334	5	8		19
12	4	(Brazil) Matheus Leist R	A. J. Foyt Enterprises	Chevrolet	82	+57.9291	6	21		18
13	26	(United States) Zach Veach R	Andretti Autosport	Honda	82	+1:05.9298	4	11		17
14	20	(United Kingdom) Jordan King R	Ed Carpenter Racing	Chevrolet	82	+1:20.0118	5	19		16
15	21	(United States) Spencer Pigot	Ed Carpenter Racing	Chevrolet	81	+1 Lap	5	17		15
16	32	(Austria) René Binder R	Juncos Racing	Chevrolet	80	+2 Laps	5	22		14
17	88	(Colombia) Gabby Chaves	Harding Racing	Chevrolet	80	+2 Laps	6	20		13
18	14	(Brazil) Tony Kanaan	A. J. Foyt Enterprises	Chevrolet	80	+2 Laps	7	23		12
19	19	(Canada) Zachary Claman DeMelo R	Dale Coyne Racing	Honda	80	+2 Laps	5	16		11
20	10	(United Arab Emirates) Ed Jones	Chip Ganassi Racing	Honda	64	Mechanical	4	12		10
21	12	(Australia) Will Power W	Team Penske	Chevrolet	53	Off Course	2	2		9
22	59	(United Kingdom) Max Chilton	Carlin	Chevrolet	34	Mechanical	4	13		8
23	23	(United States) Charlie Kimball	Carlin	Chevrolet	10	Contact	0	14		7
OFFICIAL BOX SCORE

Notes: ^{1} Points include 1 point for leading at least 1 lap during a race, an additional 2 points for leading the most race laps, and 1 point for Pole Position.

== Championship standings after the race ==
Drivers' Championship standings

	Pos	Driver	Points
1	1	(United States) Josef Newgarden	158
1	2	(United States) Alexander Rossi	145
1	3	(France) Sébastien Bourdais	119
1	4	(United States) Graham Rahal	119
	5	(Canada) James Hinchcliffe	113

Manufacturer standings

Pos	Manufacturer	Points
1	(Japan) Honda	339
2	(United States) Chevrolet	270

- Note: Only the top five positions are included.

Previous race: 2018 Toyota Grand Prix of Long Beach	IndyCar Series; 2018 season	Next race: 2018 IndyCar Grand Prix
Previous race: 2017 Honda Indy Grand Prix of Alabama	Honda Indy Grand Prix of Alabama	Next race: 2019 Honda Indy Grand Prix of Alabama
