= 2023 Indianapolis 500 =

American motor race

107th Indianapolis 500

Indianapolis Motor Speedway

Indianapolis 500
- Sanctioning body: IndyCar
- Season: 2023 IndyCar season
- Date: May 28, 2023
- Winner: (United States) Josef Newgarden
- Winning team: Team Penske
- Winning Chief Mechanic: Chad Gordon
- Time of race: 2:58:21.9611
- Average speed: 168.193 mph (270.680 km/h)
- Pole position: (Spain) Álex Palou
- Pole speed: 234.217 mph (376.936 km/h)
- Rookie of the Year: (Denmark) Benjamin Pedersen
- Most laps led: (Mexico) Pato O'Ward (39)

Pre-race ceremonies
- National anthem: Jewel
- "Back Home Again in Indiana": Jim Cornelison
- Starting command: Roger Penske
- Pace car: Chevrolet Corvette (C8)
- Pace car driver: Tyrese Haliburton
- Starter: Aaron Likens
- Honorary starter: Adam Driver

Television in the United States
- Network: NBC (blacked out locally)
- Announcers: Leigh Diffey, Townsend Bell, James Hinchcliffe
- Nielsen ratings: 2.65 (4.716 million viewers)

Chronology
Previous	Next
2022	2024

The 2023 Indianapolis 500, branded as the 107th Running of the Indianapolis 500 presented by Gainbridge for sponsorship reasons, was a 500-mile (804.7 km, 200 lap) race in the 2023 IndyCar Series, held on Sunday, May 28, at the Indianapolis Motor Speedway in Speedway, Indiana, United States. The month of May activities formally began on Saturday, May 13 with the GMR Grand Prix on the combined road course. Practice on the oval was slated to begin on May 16 but was canceled due to rain and as a result, the first practice was held on May 17. Time trials took place on May 20–21, while Carb Day, the traditional final day of practice, along with the Pit Stop Challenge, took place on May 26.

Marcus Ericsson of Chip Ganassi Racing entered the race as the defending winner. 2013 Indianapolis 500 winner and 2004 series champion Tony Kanaan announced that he would retire after the race. Álex Palou won the pole position for the race, his first pole at Indianapolis and the eighth for the Chip Ganassi Racing team. Palou's qualifying speed of 234.217 mph (376.936 km/h) set a new record for fastest pole speed for the Indianapolis 500, besting the speed that his teammate Scott Dixon had set the previous year. The run also replaced Dixon's as the second-fastest qualification run at Indianapolis ever.

Josef Newgarden passed Marcus Ericsson on a frantic restart with half a lap to go following multiple late race incidents to win his first Indianapolis 500. It was the third Indy 500 in history with a last lap pass for the win (the others being 2006 and 2011), and the first with a one-lap shootout to the finish since 1997. It was also the first Indianapolis 500 since 1973 to have the red flag put out three times and first time race was red-flagged three times in history of IndyCar Series under this title. Roger Penske (owner of Team Penske) collected his record-extending 19th Indianapolis 500 victory as an owner, and first Indy victory since purchasing the Indianapolis Motor Speedway in late 2019.

== Race background ==
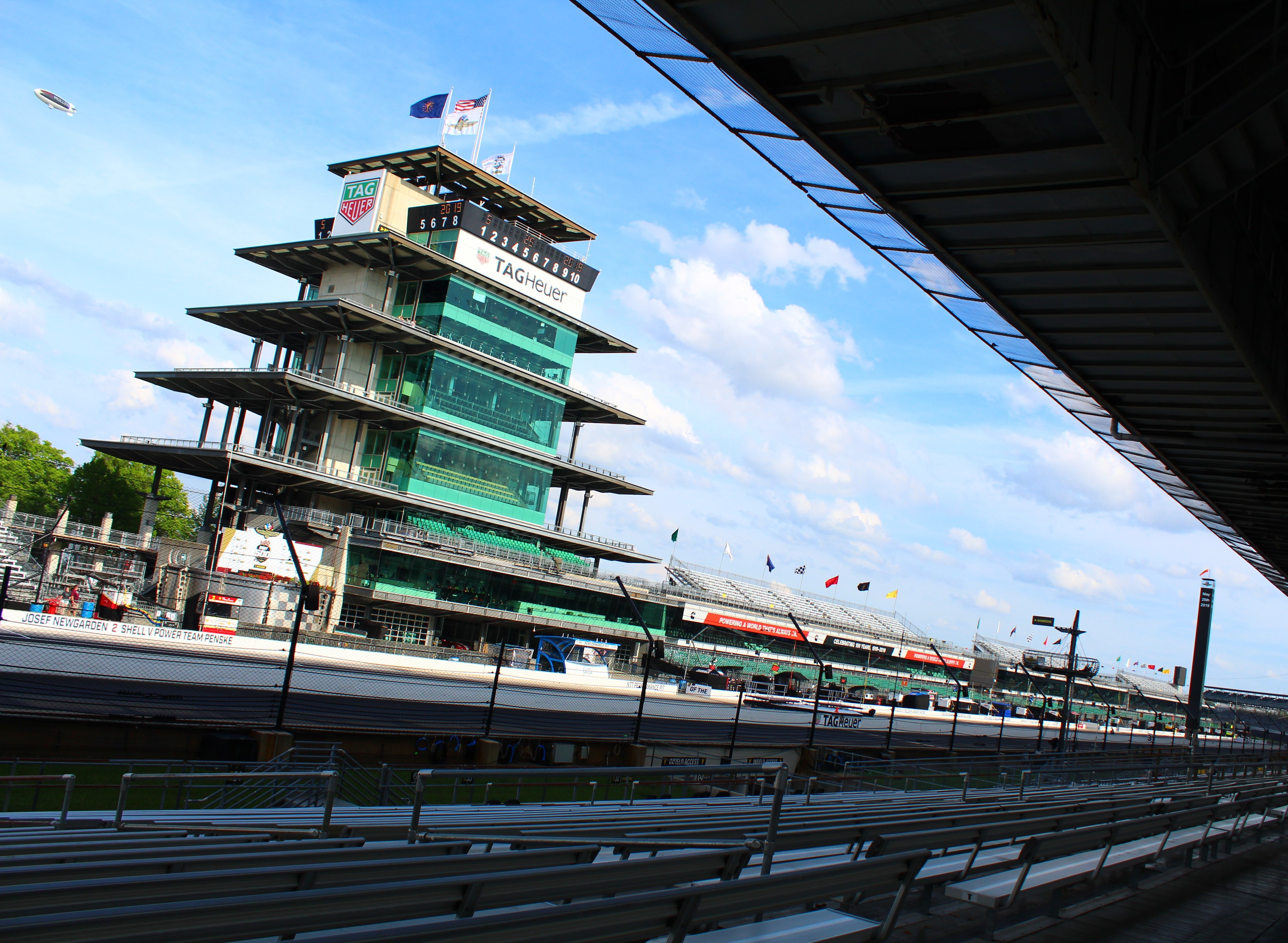
The Pagoda, the control tower which houses officials, broadcasting, and hospitality suites, is an icon at the Indianapolis Motor Speedway.

=== Sponsorship ===
On May 25, 2022, it was announced that online financial services company Gainbridge reached a multiyear agreement to extend their presenting sponsorship of the Indianapolis 500. The extension was for an undisclosed length. This will be the first year under the current deal. Gainbridge originally signed a four-year deal which was in place from 2019 to 2022.

=== Rule changes ===
- Championship points for the Indianapolis 500 will revert to standard point values. From 2014 to 2022, double points were awarded at the Indianapolis 500. Bonus points awarded during qualifying remain unchanged from 2022.
- New rear attenuators, rear wheel tethers, and new front suspension pieces have been introduced and made mandatory.
- New aerodynamic devices have been approved for use, including additional Gurney flaps, and bargeboards. Maximum allowed rear wing angles have been increased from 2° to 5° of positive inclination by use of a new mounting pillar, and an updated cockpit helmet surround will be used.
- The modified Two-day Qualifying format used in 2022 will remain in place, with one minor schedule change. On the second day (Sunday May 21), Top 12 Qualifying will start at 2 p.m., followed by Last Chance Qualifying at 4 p.m. The Firestone Fast Six will begin at 5:15 p.m.
- Previously Last Chance Qualifying took place first, followed by Top 12 Qualifying, then the Fast Six. Placing the Last Chance session between the Top 12 and Fast Six sessions is intended to provide the Fast Six teams with additional time to prepare their cars for the final runs. In addition, it provides over an hour for their engines to cool down and reduce the effects of "heat soak". Furthermore, participants in the Top 12 session will be allowed two cool down laps after their runs, to aid in the cooling process.

=== 2023 IndyCar Series ===
The 2023 Indianapolis 500 was the sixth race of the 2023 NTT IndyCar Series season. Five different drivers won the first five races of the season. Marcus Ericsson won the season opener at St. Petersburg, and Josef Newgarden won the first oval race of the season at Texas. Kyle Kirkwood then won at Long Beach, his first career IndyCar victory, followed by Scott McLaughlin at Alabama. Álex Palou won the GMR Grand Prix on the Indianapolis Motor Speedway road course, and held the championship points lead going into the Indy 500.

== Race schedules ==
The 2023 IndyCar Series schedule was announced on September 27, 2022, with the Indianapolis 500 scheduled for Sunday, May 28. Practice, time trials, and other ancillary events are scheduled for the two weeks leading up to the race. The Open Test was held on April 20–21, which included rookie orientation and refresher tests.

The GMR Grand Prix, including the Road to Indy races, again served as the opening weekend of track activity, on May 12–13. The Freedom 100 was left off the schedule for the fourth year in a row. The 2023 Indy NXT series (formerly known as Indy Lights) included a race on the road course during GMR Grand Prix weekend.

Race schedule—April 2023
Sun	Mon	Tue	Wed	Thu	Fri	Sat
16; Long Beach	17	18	19	20; Open Test	21; Open Test	22
Race schedule—May 2023
30; Alabama	1	2	3	4	5	6 Mini-Marathon
7	8	9	10	11; RTI Test	12; GMR Grand Prix	13; GMR Grand Prix
14	15	16; Practice	17; Practice	18; Practice	19; Fast Friday	20; Time Trials
21; Time Trials	22; Practice	23	24	25; Special test	26; Carb Day	27; Parade
28; Indianapolis 500	29; Memorial Day	30	31			

Color	Notes
Green	Practice
Yellow	Limited testing*
Dark Blue	Time trials
Silver	Race day
Red	Rained out**
Blank	No track activity

* 15 minutes of "shakedown testing"
available only to Katherine Legge and
Graham Rahal due to their car rebuilds/swaps

** Includes days where track
activity was significantly limited due to rain

Source: 2023 Indianapolis 500 Event Schedule

== Entry list ==
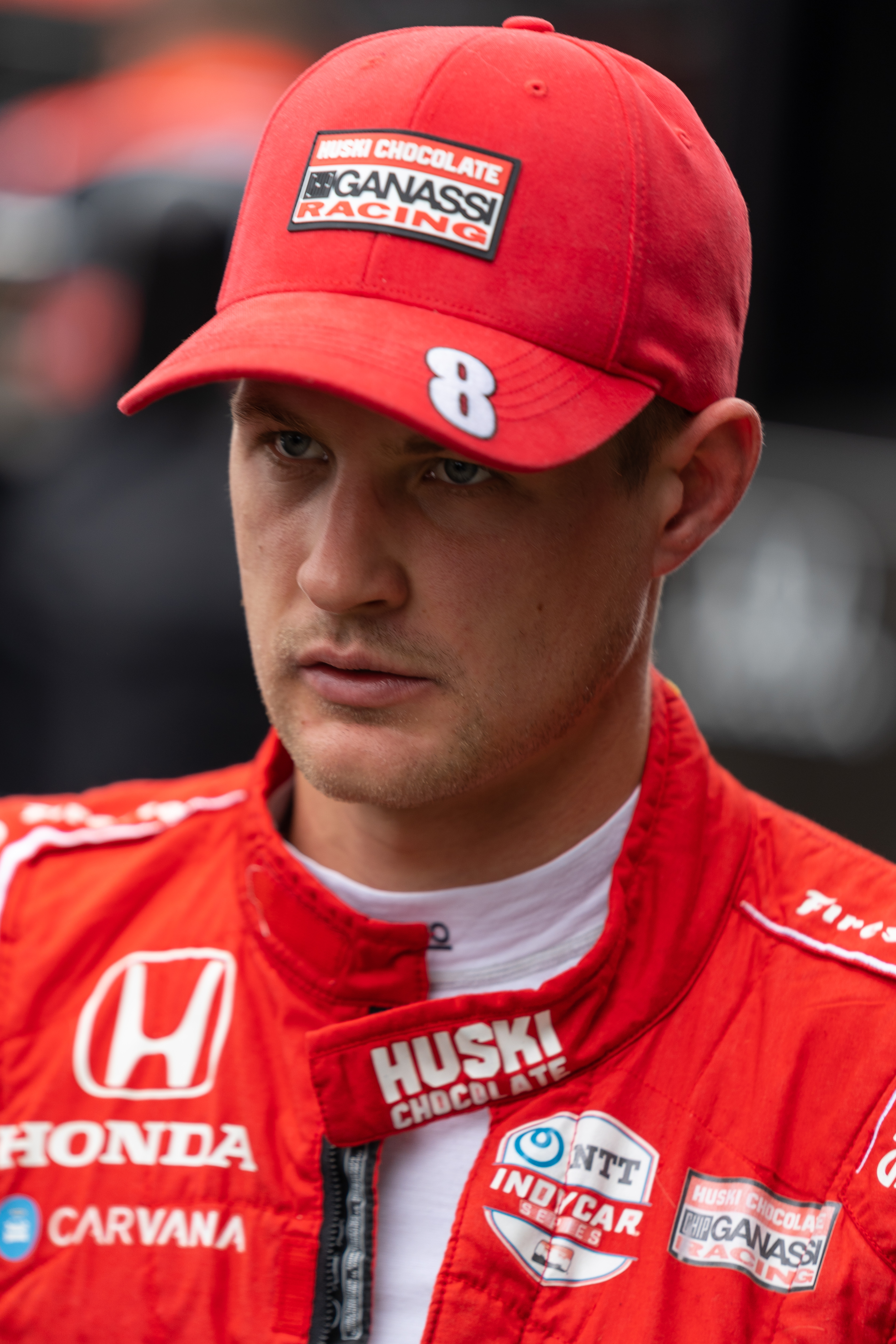
Marcus Ericsson was the defending race winner.

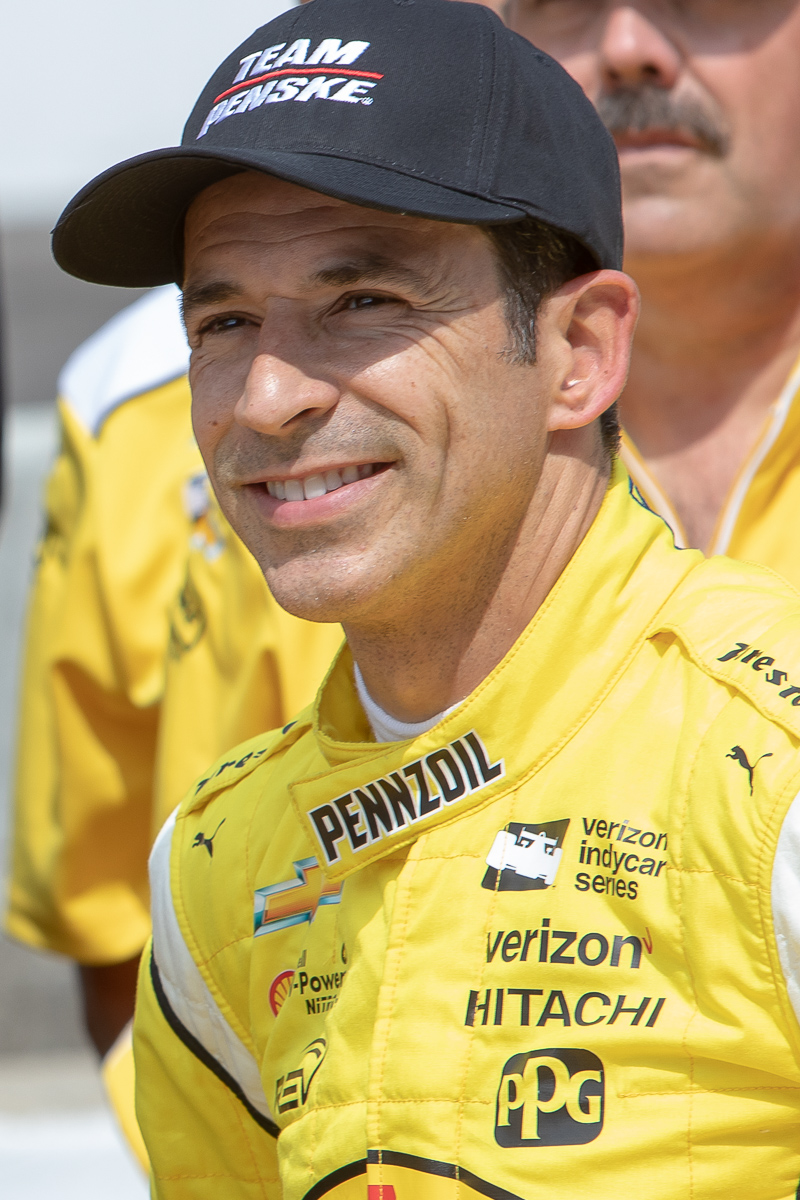
Four-time race winner Hélio Castroneves (2001, 2002, 2009, 2021) had the most previous starts in the field with 22.

All entries utilized a spec Dallara IR18 chassis with universal aero kit and Firestone tires. 34 entries were confirmed, including nine former winners and four race rookies. 2013 winner and 2004 champion Tony Kanaan announced that he would retire after the race. Four-time race winner Hélio Castroneves attempted to make his 23rd "500" (all consecutive), leading all active drivers. Katherine Legge made her first appearance since 2013, the first female participant since 2021; no female drivers entered in 2022. On April 15, Racer confirmed that both Chevrolet and Honda will supply 17 entries each. With 34 confirmed entries, bumping will return for the first time since 2021. The official entry list was released on May 15.

No.	Driver	Team	Engine	Ref.
2	(United States) Josef Newgarden	Team Penske	Chevrolet	
3	(New Zealand) Scott McLaughlin	Team Penske	Chevrolet	
5	(Mexico) Pato O'Ward	Arrow McLaren	Chevrolet	
6	(Sweden) Felix Rosenqvist	Arrow McLaren	Chevrolet	
06	(Brazil) Hélio Castroneves W	Meyer Shank Racing	Honda	
7	(United States) Alexander Rossi W	Arrow McLaren	Chevrolet	
8	(Sweden) Marcus Ericsson W	Chip Ganassi Racing	Honda	
9	(New Zealand) Scott Dixon W	Chip Ganassi Racing	Honda	
10	(Spain) Álex Palou	Chip Ganassi Racing	Honda	
11	(Japan) Takuma Sato W	Chip Ganassi Racing	Honda	
12	(Australia) Will Power W	Team Penske	Chevrolet	
14	(United States) Santino Ferrucci	A. J. Foyt Enterprises	Chevrolet	
15	(United States) Graham Rahal	Rahal Letterman Lanigan Racing	Honda	
18	(United States) David Malukas	Dale Coyne Racing with HMD Motorsports	Honda	
20	(United States) Conor Daly	Ed Carpenter Racing	Chevrolet	
21	(Netherlands) Rinus VeeKay	Ed Carpenter Racing	Chevrolet	
23	(United States) Ryan Hunter-Reay W	Dreyer & Reinbold Racing	Chevrolet	
24	(United Kingdom) Stefan Wilson	Dreyer & Reinbold Racing / Cusick Motorsports	Chevrolet	
26	(United States) Colton Herta	Andretti Autosport w/ Curb-Agajanian	Honda	
27	(United States) Kyle Kirkwood	Andretti Autosport	Honda	
28	(France) Romain Grosjean	Andretti Autosport	Honda	
29	(Canada) Devlin DeFrancesco	Andretti Steinbrenner Autosport	Honda	
30	(United Kingdom) Jack Harvey	Rahal Letterman Lanigan Racing	Honda	
33	(United States) Ed Carpenter	Ed Carpenter Racing	Chevrolet	
44	(United Kingdom) Katherine Legge	Rahal Letterman Lanigan Racing	Honda	
45	(Denmark) Christian Lundgaard	Rahal Letterman Lanigan Racing	Honda	
50	(United States) R. C. Enerson R	Abel Motorsports	Chevrolet	
51	(United States) Sting Ray Robb R	Dale Coyne Racing with Rick Ware Racing	Honda	
55	(Denmark) Benjamin Pedersen R	A. J. Foyt Enterprises	Chevrolet	
60	(France) Simon Pagenaud W	Meyer Shank Racing	Honda	
66	(Brazil) Tony Kanaan W	Arrow McLaren	Chevrolet	
77	(United Kingdom) Callum Ilott	Juncos Hollinger Racing	Chevrolet	
78	(Argentina) Agustín Canapino R	Juncos Hollinger Racing	Chevrolet	
98	(United States) Marco Andretti	Andretti Herta Autosport with Marco Andretti & Curb-Agajanian	Honda	
Official Report

- W Former Indianapolis 500 winner
- R Indianapolis 500 rookie

== Testing and rookie orientation ==
A full-field open test was scheduled on the Indianapolis Motor Speedway oval for April 20–21, 2023. Katherine Legge, who has not competed in the race since 2013, took part in an oval re-acclimation test with Rahal Letterman Lanigan Racing at Texas Motor Speedway on April 3. Linus Lundqvist, the 2022 Indy Lights champion, also participated in the private oval test at Texas, but did not secure a ride for the Indy 500.

The rookie orientation test was conducted in three phases. For phase 1, each driver was required to complete ten laps between 205–210 mph (330–338 km/h), while demonstrating satisfactory car control, proper racing line, and safe interaction with other cars on the circuit. The laps do not have to be consecutive. Phase 2 was fifteen laps between 210–215 mph (338–346 km/h), and phase 3 was fifteen laps over 215 mph (346 km/h). Veteran drivers that have not competed in an IndyCar oval race since the previous year's Indy 500 are required to take a refresher test. The refresher test consists of phase 2 and phase 3 of the aforementioned rookie test.

=== Open Test—Thursday April 20 ===
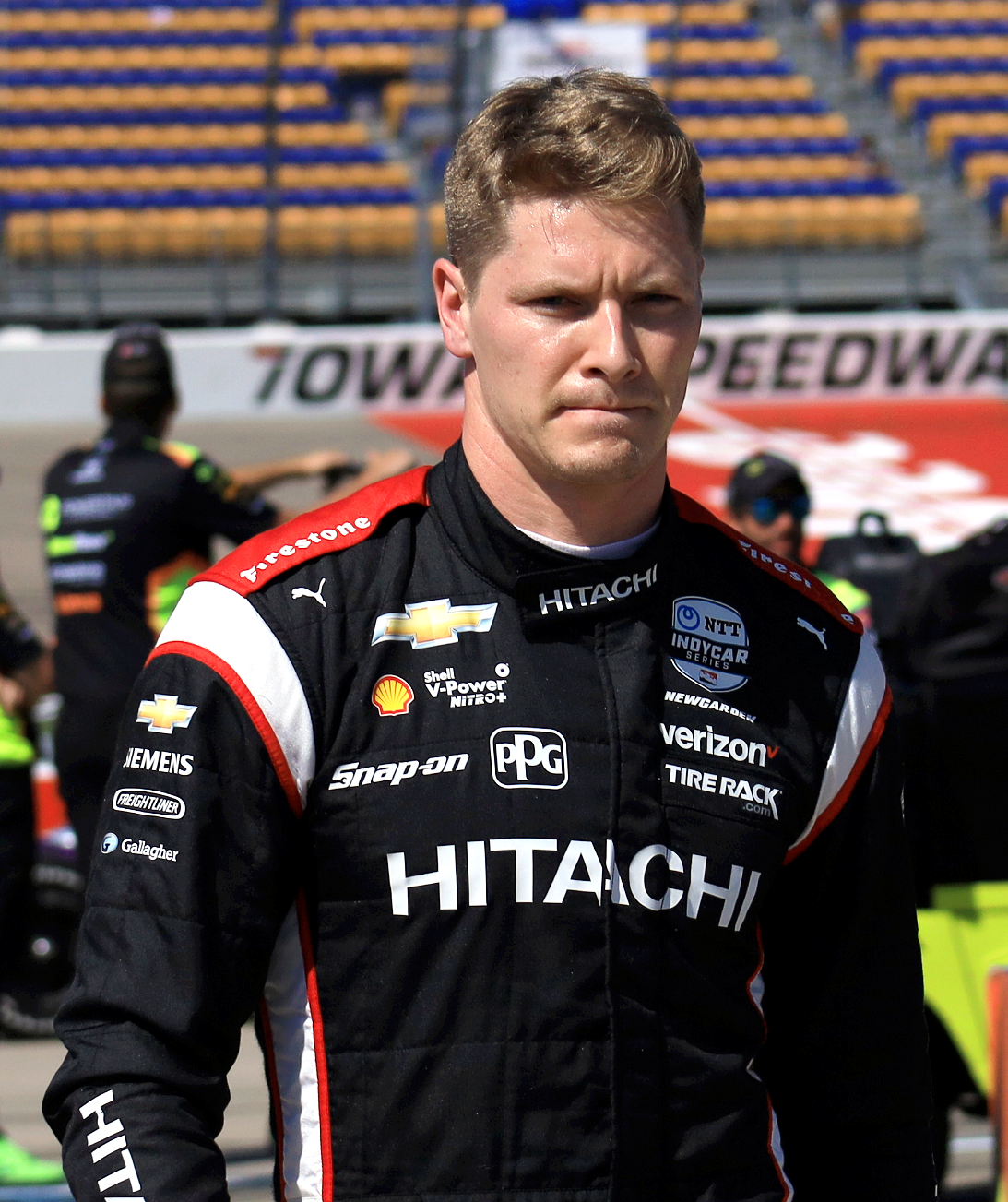
Josef Newgarden set the fastest lap during the Open Test.

- Weather: 84 °F (29 °C), Mostly cloudy with rain in early afternoon, partly cloudy and high winds later
- Summary: The first day of testing was divided into three sessions: first a veterans-only session beginning at 10:00 a.m., second the rookie and refresher session beginning at 12:00 p.m., and lastly a full-field session at 2:00 p.m. lasting until 6:30 p.m. The timing of the sessions were brought forward and extended due to a threat of poor weather both late Thursday and on Friday. During the veterans-only session to start to day, defending race winner Marcus Ericsson was the fastest, running a lap at 224.330 mph (361.024 km/h).

At 12:00 p.m., the track opened for drivers requiring rookie orientation or refresher tests. All drivers needing these tests took to the track except R. C. Enerson. Later in the day, Enerson was officially announced as the 34th entry with Abel Motorsports, and would conduct his rookie/refresher test during May. The rookie/refresher session was cut short by roughly thirty minutes due to light rain. However, all drivers completed their tests except Agustín Canapino, who needed to finish the final lap of his rookie orientation run. IndyCar officials permitted his to complete the test during the full-field session. Marco Andretti turned the fastest lap in the rookie/refresher session at 221.569 mph (356.581 km/h). The session was briefly halted for a tow-in for Katherine Legge, who ran out of fuel and stalled out on track. She was able to continue in the session.

The full-field session was slightly delayed by the rain, but drivers were still provided over four hours of track time. During the session, Canapino completed his rookie test, meaning that all drivers present needing their rookie/refresher tests successfully completed. With predictions that Friday's testing would likely be canceled by rain, drivers turned a large number of laps during the day, with a cumulative 3,522 laps being run among all drivers. Josef Newgarden turned the fastest lap of the day at 227.686 mph (366.425 km/h). The fastest "no-tow" lap - a lap completed without the aid of aerodynamic drafting - went to Devlin DeFrancesco with a lap at 221.119 mph (355.857 km/h). No major incidents occurred during the session, but Katherine Legge suffered a second mechanical issue with less than five minutes remaining that forced her to coast back to the pit lane in the warm-up lane between turns 3 and 4.

Top speeds
Pos	No.	Driver	Team	Engine	Speed (mph)	Speed (km/h)
1	2	(United States) Josef Newgarden	Team Penske	Chevrolet	227.686	366.425
2	20	(United States) Conor Daly	Ed Carpenter Racing	Chevrolet	227.466	366.071
3	9	(New Zealand) Scott Dixon	Chip Ganassi Racing	Honda	226.788	364.980
Official Report

=== Open test—Friday April 21 ===
The scheduled second day of the open test was canceled due to rain.

== Practice ==
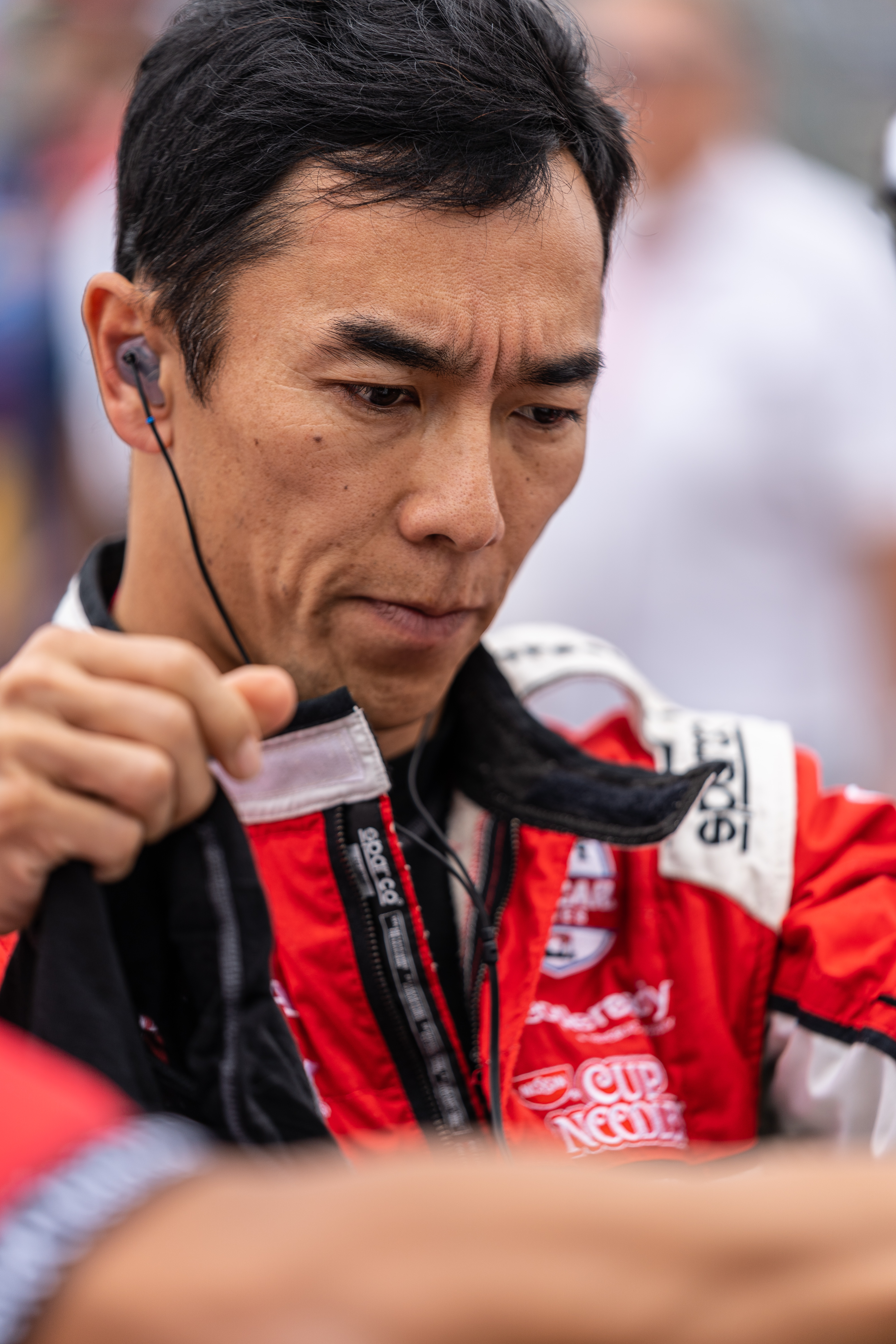
Takuma Sato was fastest on both May 17 and May 19.

=== Opening day—Tuesday May 16 ===
- Weather: 63 °F (17 °C), Rain
- Summary: Rain throughout the day caused the opening day of practice to be canceled.

=== Wednesday May 17 ===
- Weather: 72 °F (22 °C), Mostly cloudy
- Summary: Wednesday's practice schedule was changed in response to the rainout on opening day. The track opened at 10:00 a.m. for a five-minute session for teams to perform installation laps. At 10:15 a.m., the track was made available for Rookie and Refresher tests, which lasted until 12:00 p.m. R. C. Enerson was the only participant in the Rookie session, where he successfully completed his orientation phases. The track was opened to all competitors at 12 p.m. Takuma Sato turned the fastest lap of the day, running at 229.439 mph (369.246 km/h). Rinus VeeKay turned the fastest "no-tow" lap of the day at 223.212 mph (359.225 km/h). No major incidents occurred during the day. Graham Rahal had the only wall contact of the day. At about 12:49 p.m., he drifted high exiting turn three, and brushed the outside wall with the right side of the car. Damage on Rahal's car was minimal. Late in the session, at 5:28 p.m., Ed Carpenter was going slow along the inside of the backstretch, heading for the warm-up lane. Scott McLaughlin was on his outside, and Ryan Hunter-Reay was coming up quickly behind. Hunter-Reay diced precariously between the two cars, narrowly avoiding a collision.

Top speeds
Pos	No.	Driver	Team	Engine	Speed (mph)	Speed (km/h)
1	11	(Japan) Takuma Sato	Chip Ganassi Racing	Honda	229.439	369.246
2	9	(New Zealand) Scott Dixon	Chip Ganassi Racing	Honda	229.174	368.820
3	14	(United States) Santino Ferrucci	A. J. Foyt Racing	Chevrolet	228.977	368.503
Official Report

=== Thursday May 18 ===
- Weather: 74 °F (23 °C), Partly cloudy
- Summary: Thursday practice opened at noon and ran until 6:00 p.m. Marcus Ericsson turned the fastest lap of the day, running at 229.607 mph (369.517 km/h). Ericsson also led the "no-tow" rankings with a lap at 224.414 mph (361.159 km/h). No major incidents occurred during the session, but a near collision occurred late in the day when R. C. Enerson moved into the pit exit lane to avoid other cars on track and nearly collected Pato O'Ward, who was leaving the pit lane at the same time.

Top speeds
Pos	No.	Driver	Team	Engine	Speed (mph)	Speed (km/h)
1	8	(Sweden) Marcus Ericsson	Chip Ganassi Racing	Honda	229.607	369.517
2	9	(New Zealand) Scott Dixon	Chip Ganassi Racing	Honda	229.186	368.839
3	60	(France) Simon Pagenaud	Meyer Shank Racing	Honda	228.681	368.026
Official Report

=== Fast Friday—Friday May 19 ===
- Weather: 80 °F (27 °C), Mostly cloudy with gusty winds.
- Summary: For Friday practice, teams increased turbo boost pressures to their qualifying levels of 1.5 bar (22 psi), resulting in higher speeds. Takuma Sato ran both the single fastest lap and the fastest four-lap average - a simulation of a qualifying run - running the single fastest lap at 234.753 miles per hour (377.798 km/h) and a four lap average of 233.413 miles per hour (375.642 km/h). No major incidents occurred during the session, however two entries suffered major mechanical problems. Juncos Hollinger Racing made the decision to switch Callum Ilott's car to a back-up chassis midway through the session after struggling with the handling of the car for all previous practice sessions, stating that the handling was so poor that it was unsafe to drive. At roughly 5:45 p.m., Jack Harvey suffered an apparent engine failure, bringing out a caution period for the session.

Overnight, it was reported that both Scott Dixon and Álex Palou underwent engine changes. In addition, Callum Ilott's crew completed work on their back-up chassis. All three would be ready for Saturday morning practice.

Top speeds
Pos	No.	Driver	Team	Engine	Speed (mph)	Speed (km/h)
1	11	(Japan) Takuma Sato	Chip Ganassi Racing	Honda	234.753	377.798
2	98	(United States) Marco Andretti	Andretti Herta Autosport w/ Marco Andretti & Curb-Agajanian	Honda	234.202	376.912
3	21	(Netherlands) Rinus VeeKay	Ed Carpenter Racing	Chevrolet	234.171	376.862
Official Report

== Time trials ==
=== Saturday, May 20 ===
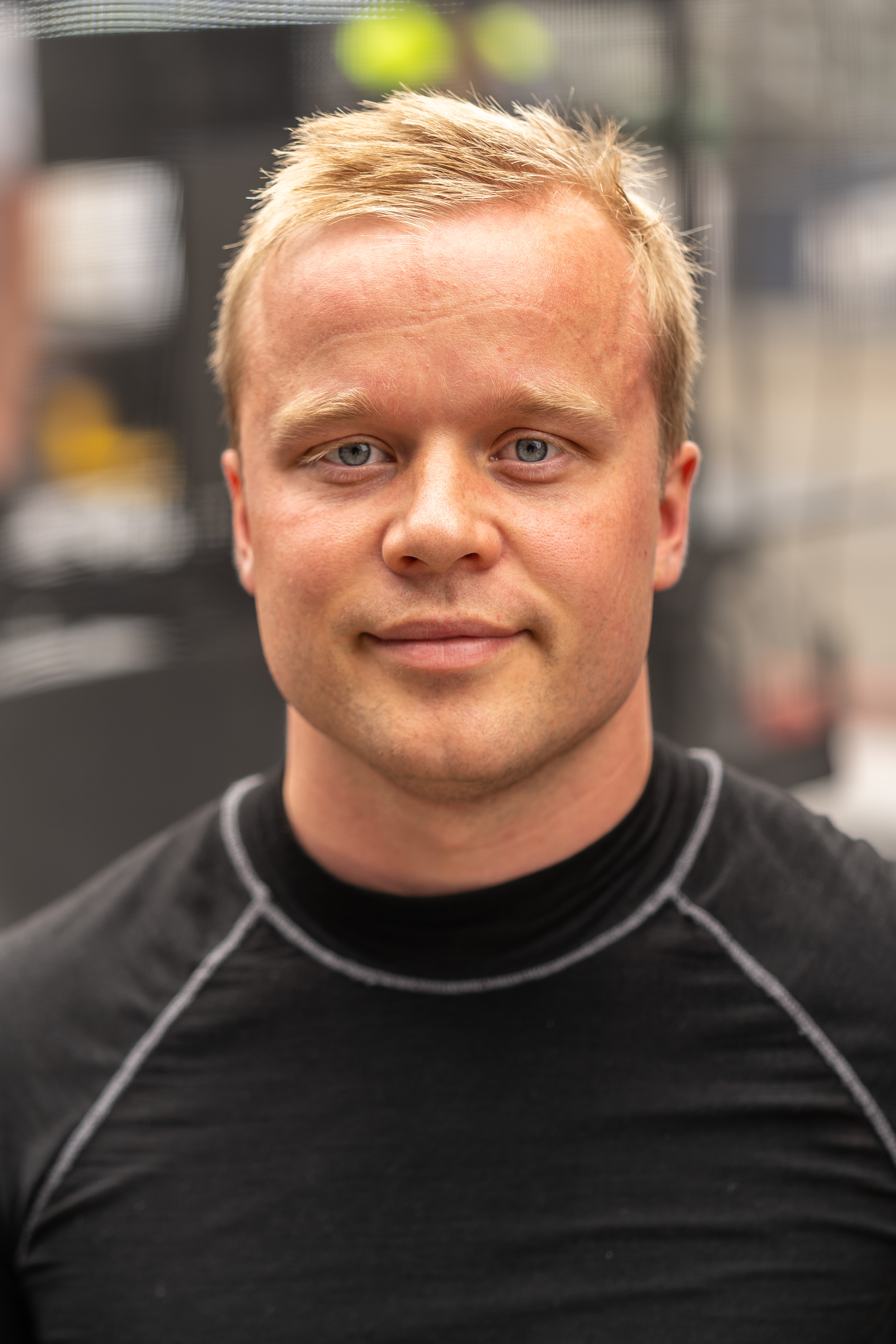
Felix Rosenqvist was the fastest qualifier on Saturday

- Weather: 66 °F (19 °C), Fair with winds up to 16 mph (26 km/h)
- Summary: Time trials on Saturday locked in positions 13th–30th. Cars qualifying 1st–12th advanced to the Top 12 Qualifying session on Sunday. Cars qualifying 31st–34th took part in the Last Chance Qualifying session on Sunday to determine the final row of the starting grid.

Qualifications began at 11:00 a.m. and lasted until 5:50 p.m. All drivers were given one guaranteed run during the day, with the guaranteed qualifying order based on a random draw the night before. Felix Rosenqvist turned the fastest speed of the first day of qualifications, running a four lap average of 233.947 mph (376.501 km/h) on his 2nd attempt with roughly an hour left in qualifications. Teammate Alexander Rossi qualified 2nd during the day at 233.528 mph (375.827 km/h). The only notable incident during qualification came during rookie Agustín Canapino's second attempt, where he made contact with the wall in turn 1 and bent the rear suspension of his car.

With 34 entries in the race, only the top 30 cars were locked into the field on Saturday, with the last four needing to go out on Sunday in the Last Chance Qualifying session to determine positions 31st-33rd. Rahal Letterman Lanigan Racing performed poorly during Saturday qualifications, with three of their four entries failing to make the top 30 and being forced into the Last Chance Qualifying. Dale Coyne Racing's entries also struggled during the session with both Sting Ray Robb and David Malukas being outside the top 30 for most of the day. However, Malukas was able to find speed with less than 10 minutes remaining in the session to qualify 23rd. Robb was unable to qualify fast enough to make the top 30. Callum Ilott, who had changed chassis the previous day, qualified 28th on his second attempt during the day. R. C. Enerson, who had been considered a pre-race favorite to not make the race, qualified 29th and locked himself into the race.

Katherine Legge ended the day "on the bubble" surviving a last-minute bumping attempt by her teammate Christian Lundgaard. Legge set an Indy 500 qualifying speed record for female drivers (231.070 mph (371.871 km/h)), and was the last car locked-in to the field. A. J. Foyt Racing teammates Santino Ferrucci and Benjamin Pedersen both made the Top 12, the first time the Foyt team has made the pole "shootout" since its inception in 2010. Pedersen also set a one-lap rookie qualifying record (233.297 mph (375.455 km/h)).

Pos	No.	Driver	Team	Engine	Speed (mph)	Speed (km/h)
Top 12 qualifiers
1	6	(Sweden) Felix Rosenqvist	Arrow McLaren	Chevrolet	233.947	376.501
2	7	(United States) Alexander Rossi W	Arrow McLaren	Chevrolet	233.528	375.827
3	10	(Spain) Álex Palou	Chip Ganassi Racing	Honda	233.398	375.618
4	21	(Netherlands) Rinus VeeKay	Ed Carpenter Racing	Chevrolet	233.395	375.613
5	9	(New Zealand) Scott Dixon W	Chip Ganassi Racing	Honda	233.375	375.581
6	66	(Brazil) Tony Kanaan W	Arrow McLaren	Chevrolet	233.347	375.536
7	11	(Japan) Takuma Sato W	Chip Ganassi Racing	Honda	233.322	375.495
8	5	(Mexico) Pato O'Ward	Arrow McLaren	Chevrolet	233.252	375.383
9	14	(United States) Santino Ferrucci	A. J. Foyt Racing	Chevrolet	233.147	375.214
10	8	(Sweden) Marcus Ericsson W	Chip Ganassi Racing	Honda	233.030	375.025
11	55	(Denmark) Benjamin Pedersen R	A. J. Foyt Racing	Chevrolet	232.739	374.557
12	12	(Australia) Will Power W	Team Penske	Chevrolet	232.719	374.525
Positions 13–30
13	33	(United States) Ed Carpenter	Ed Carpenter Racing	Chevrolet	232.689	374.477
14	3	(New Zealand) Scott McLaughlin	Team Penske	Chevrolet	232.677	374.457
15	27	(United States) Kyle Kirkwood	Andretti Autosport	Honda	232.662	374.433
16	20	(United States) Conor Daly	Ed Carpenter Racing	Chevrolet	232.433	374.065
17	2	(United States) Josef Newgarden	Team Penske	Chevrolet	232.402	374.015
18	23	(United States) Ryan Hunter-Reay W	Dreyer & Reinbold Racing	Chevrolet	232.133	373.582
19	28	(France) Romain Grosjean	Andretti Autosport	Honda	231.997	373.363
20	06	(Brazil) Hélio Castroneves W	Meyer Shank Racing	Honda	231.954	373.294
21	26	(United States) Colton Herta	Andretti Autosport w/ Curb-Agajanian	Honda	231.951	373.289
22	60	(France) Simon Pagenaud W	Meyer Shank Racing	Honda	231.878	373.171
23	18	(United States) David Malukas	Dale Coyne Racing w/ HMD Motorsports	Honda	231.769	372.996
24	98	(United States) Marco Andretti	Andretti Herta Autosport w/ Marco Andretti & Curb-Agajanian	Honda	231.682	372.856
25	24	(United Kingdom) Stefan Wilson	Dreyer & Reinbold Racing w/ Cusick Motorsports	Chevrolet	231.648	372.801
26	29	(Canada) Devlin DeFrancesco	Andretti Steinbrenner Autosport	Honda	231.353	372.327
27	78	(Argentina) Agustín Canapino R	Juncos Hollinger Racing	Chevrolet	231.320	372.273
28	77	(United Kingdom) Callum Ilott	Juncos Hollinger Racing	Chevrolet	231.182	372.051
29	50	(United States) R. C. Enerson R	Abel Motorsports	Chevrolet	231.129	371.966
30	44	(United Kingdom) Katherine Legge	Rahal Letterman Lanigan Racing	Honda	231.070	371.871
Last Chance Qualifiers
31	45	(Denmark) Christian Lundgaard	Rahal Letterman Lanigan Racing	Honda	No time	
32	51	(United States) Sting Ray Robb R	Dale Coyne Racing w/ Rick Ware Racing	Honda	No time	
33	30	(United Kingdom) Jack Harvey	Rahal Letterman Lanigan Racing	Honda	No time	
34	15	(United States) Graham Rahal	Rahal Letterman Lanigan Racing	Honda	No time	
Official Report

=== Sunday, May 21 ===
- Weather: 77 °F (25 °C), Fair with calm winds.

Sunday qualifications were divided into three sessions. The first session was the Top 12 qualifying session at 2:00 p.m., during which the top six qualifiers would advance to the Fast Six session later in the day, while positions 7–12 would be locked in place. The second session of the day was the Last Chance Qualifying session from 4:00 p.m. to 5:00 p.m., which would determine positions 31–33 and the one entry failing to qualify for the race. The final session of the day was the Fast Six session beginning at 5:15 p.m., which would set the top six starting positions.

==== Top 12 qualifying ====
- Summary: Top 12 qualifying began at 2:00 p.m. Felix Rosenqvist was fastest, eclipsing his time from the previous day with a four lap average at 234.081 mph (376.717 km/h). A. J. Foyt Racing's Santino Ferrucci improved greatly from his Saturday run, posting the second fastest speed of the session at 233.911 mph (376.443 km/h). Also advancing on to the Fast Six session were Rinus VeeKay, Álex Palou, Scott Dixon, and Pato O'Ward. Alexander Rossi, who had been second fastest on Saturday, was not fast enough on Sunday to qualify in the Top Six.

Pos	No.	Driver	Team	Engine	Speed (mph)	Speed (km/h)
Fast Six qualifiers
1	6	(Sweden) Felix Rosenqvist	Arrow McLaren	Chevrolet	234.081	376.717
2	14	(United States) Santino Ferrucci	A. J. Foyt Racing	Chevrolet	233.911	376.443
3	21	(Netherlands) Rinus VeeKay	Ed Carpenter Racing	Chevrolet	233.801	376.266
4	10	(Spain) Álex Palou	Chip Ganassi Racing	Honda	233.779	376.231
5	9	(New Zealand) Scott Dixon W	Chip Ganassi Racing	Honda	233.430	375.669
6	5	(Mexico) Pato O'Ward	Arrow McLaren	Chevrolet	233.229	375.346
Positions 7–12
7	7	(United States) Alexander Rossi W	Arrow McLaren	Chevrolet	233.110	375.154
8	11	(Japan) Takuma Sato W	Chip Ganassi Racing	Honda	233.098	375.135
9	66	(Brazil) Tony Kanaan W	Arrow McLaren	Chevrolet	233.076	375.099
10	8	(Sweden) Marcus Ericsson W	Chip Ganassi Racing	Honda	232.889	374.799
11	55	(Denmark) Benjamin Pedersen R	A. J. Foyt Racing	Chevrolet	232.671	374.448
12	12	(Australia) Will Power W	Team Penske	Chevrolet	232.635	374.390
Official Report

==== Last Chance Qualifying ====
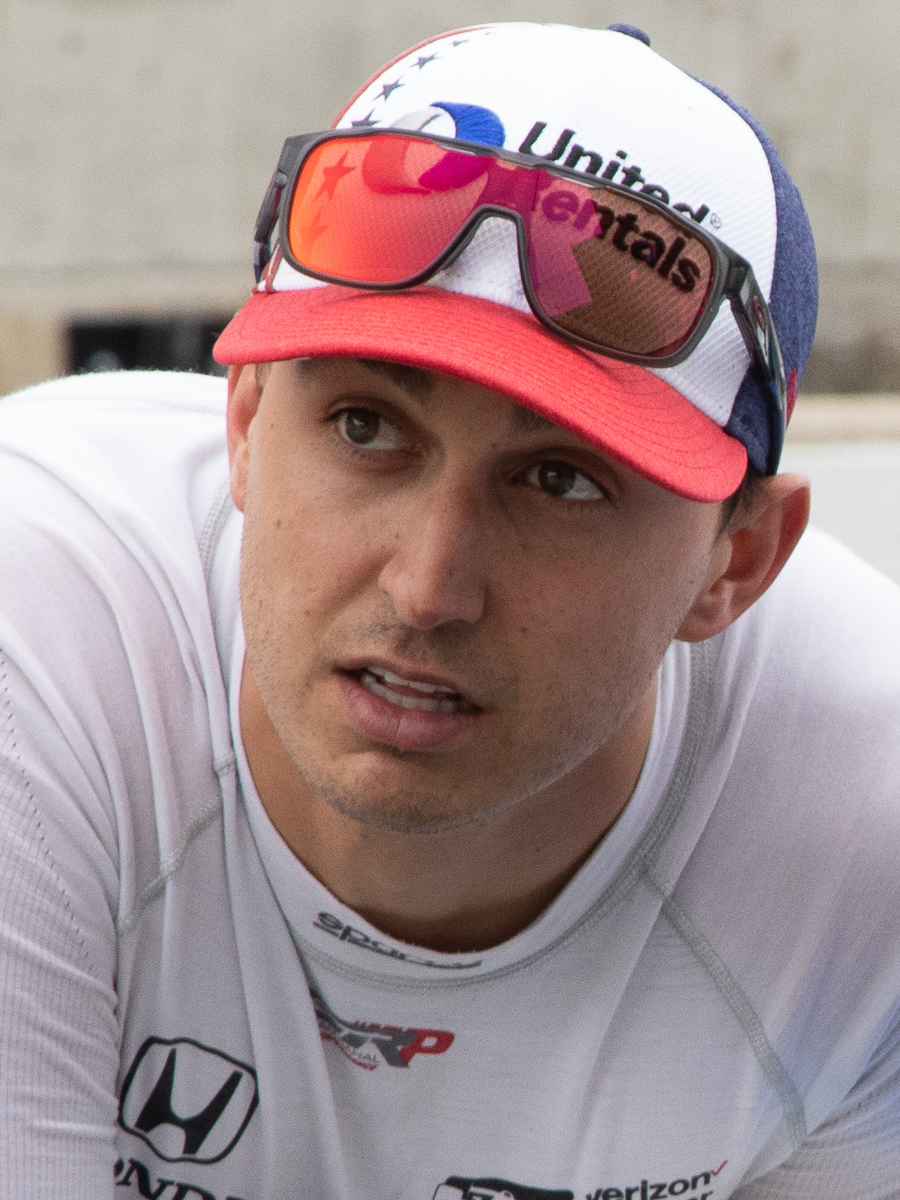
Graham Rahal was bumped from the field and failed to qualify

- Summary: The Last Chance Qualifying session was delayed by five minutes, opening at 4:05 p.m. and lasting until 5:05 p.m. The session determined positions 31–33 for the starting grid and which car would not qualify. Each car was given one guaranteed attempt, with subsequent attempts allowed but requiring the withdrawal of a previous attempt. After the guaranteed runs, Jack Harvey was the slowest of the drivers in the session. After the initial failure to reach the top 33, Harvey made two more attempts. Harvey's third attempt came as time expired during the session, during which Harvey qualified fast enough to bump his teammate Graham Rahal out of the field, meaning that Rahal would not start the race. Rahal's failure to qualify came thirty years after his father Bobby Rahal failed to qualify for the 1993 race.

Pos	No.	Driver	Team	Engine	Speed (mph)	Speed (km/h)
Positions 31–33
31	45	(Denmark) Christian Lundgaard	Rahal Letterman Lanigan Racing	Honda	229.649	369.584
32	51	(United States) Sting Ray Robb R	Dale Coyne Racing w/ Rick Ware Racing	Honda	229.549	369.423
33	30	(United Kingdom) Jack Harvey	Rahal Letterman Lanigan Racing	Honda	229.166	368.807
Failed to Qualify
34	15	(United States) Graham Rahal	Rahal Letterman Lanigan Racing	Honda	229.159	368.796
Official Report

==== Fast Six Qualifying ====
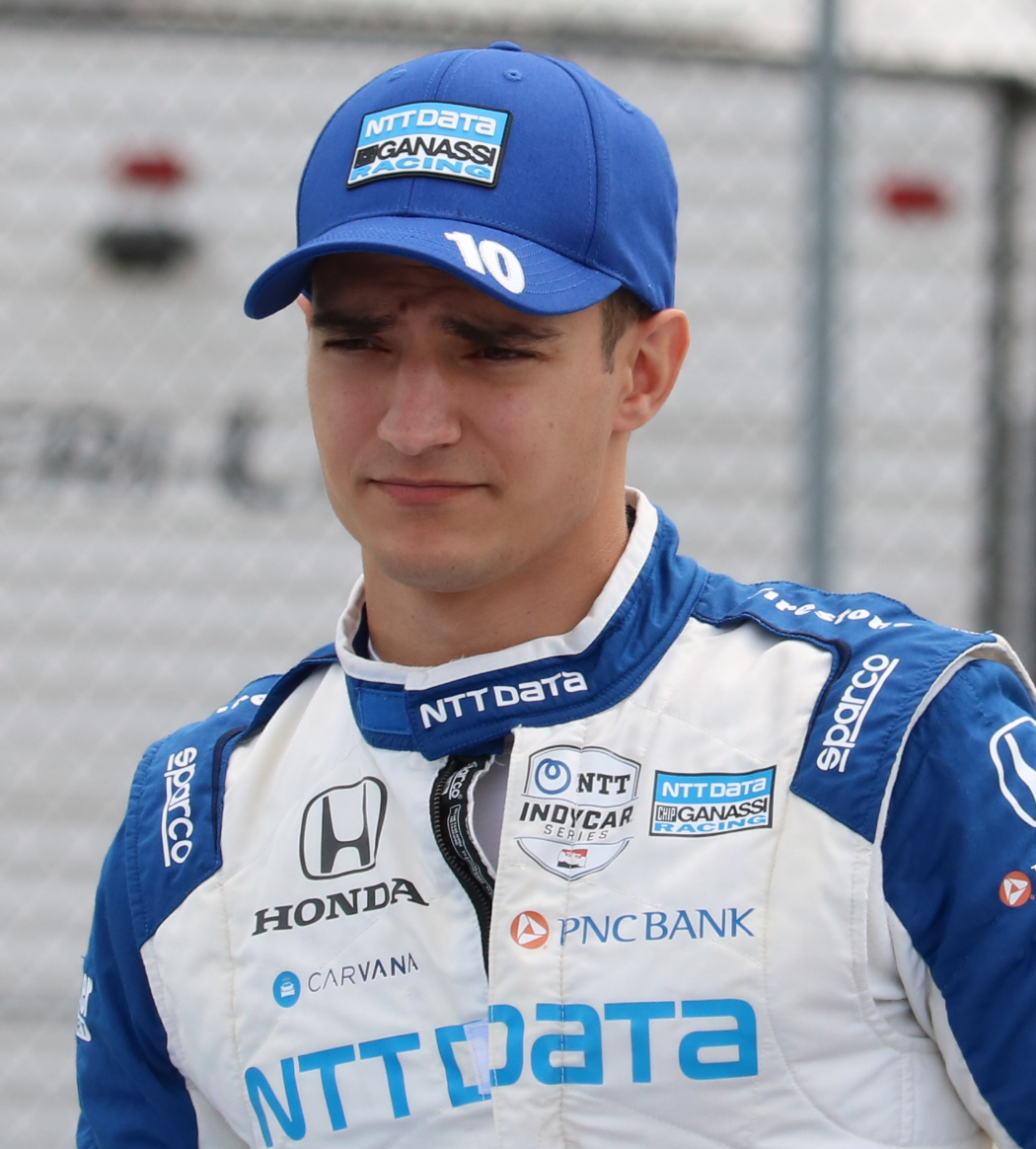
Álex Palou qualified on pole position with a new pole speed record.

- Summary: Fast Six qualifying began almost immediately after the end of the Last Chance session. The Fast Six session determined positions 1-6 for the race. Álex Palou qualified on pole position, besting his teammate Scott Dixon's pole speed record from the previous year with a four lap average of 234.217 mph (376.936 km/h). Palou's run was also the second fastest qualification in the history of the Indianapolis 500. Rinus VeeKay qualified second, only .006 mph (0.0097 km/h) slower than Palou over the four laps. Both Palou and VeeKay ran one lap exceeding 235 mph (378 km/h) during their runs. The 2023 front row was the closest in the history of the Indianapolis 500, with only .103 mph (0.166 km/h) separating the top 3 qualifiers.

The 2023 grid set a new record for the fastest qualifying field in race history, with an average speed of 232.184 mph (373.664 km/h) across the 33 qualifiers.

Pos	No.	Driver	Team	Engine	Speed (mph)	Speed (km/h)
Positions 1–6
1	10	(Spain) Álex Palou	Chip Ganassi Racing	Honda	234.217	376.936
2	21	(Netherlands) Rinus VeeKay	Ed Carpenter Racing	Chevrolet	234.211	376.926
3	6	(Sweden) Felix Rosenqvist	Arrow McLaren	Chevrolet	234.114	376.770
4	14	(United States) Santino Ferrucci	A. J. Foyt Racing	Chevrolet	233.661	376.041
5	5	(Mexico) Pato O'Ward	Arrow McLaren	Chevrolet	233.158	375.231
6	9	(New Zealand) Scott Dixon W	Chip Ganassi Racing	Honda	233.151	375.220
Official Report

== Post-qualifying practice ==
=== Post-qualifying practice — Monday May 22 ===
- Weather: 80 °F (27 °C), Mostly cloudy
- Summary: Post-qualifying practice was scheduled for two hours, from 1:00 p.m. to 3:00 p.m. With qualifications complete, teams returned to their race turbo boost levels. The session saw the first major incident of the month. At 2:11 p.m., Katherine Legge collided with Stefan Wilson after cars ahead of them slowed unexpectedly in turn 1. Both drivers lost control of their cars and impacted the outside wall. Legge was not injured in the accident, but Wilson was placed on a stretcher and taken to hospital for evaluation for back injuries. Following the accident, the session was extended by thirty minutes to allow competitors more track time. Will Power was the fastest during the post-qualifying session, turning a lap at 229.222 mph (368.897 km/h).

On Monday evening, Dreyer & Reinbold Racing released a press statement indicating that Stefan Wilson had suffered a fractured vertebra in the practice crash and would be forced out of the race. On Tuesday May 23, Graham Rahal, who was bumped from the field on Sunday, was named as Wilson's replacement.

Top practice speeds
Pos	No.	Driver	Team	Engine	Speed (mph)	Speed (km/h)
1	12	(Australia) Will Power	Team Penske	Chevrolet	229.222	368.897
2	9	(New Zealand) Scott Dixon	Chip Ganassi Racing	Honda	229.184	368.836
3	11	(Japan) Takuma Sato	Chip Ganassi Racing	Honda	228.382	367.545
Official Report

=== Special test — Thursday May 25 ===
IndyCar officials announced on Wednesday, May 24 that Graham Rahal and Katherine Legge would be given a 15-minute session on Thursday to do installation laps for their cars following the accident the entries had been involved in on Monday. As a shakedown only session, IndyCar ruled that the drivers could not complete full laps around the track and were required return to the pit lane immediately after leaving.

=== Carb Day – Friday May 26 ===
- Weather: 71 °F (22 °C), Fair
- Summary: Carb Day practice—the final practice before the race—was scheduled for two hours from 11:00 a.m. to 1:00 p.m. Several minor incidents dotted the session. Colton Herta locked his tires trying to slow to enter pit lane, which caused one of his tires to fail. Ryan Hunter-Reay was forced out of the session early with a leaking gearbox on his car. Katherine Legge caused a halt in track activities just after noon when a tire came loose on her car, forcing her to stop on track. Devlin DeFrancesco suffered a punctured tire that nearly caused him to crash in turn 2 but avoided an accident. Takuma Sato set the fastest lap of the session at 227.855 mph (366.697 km/h). After the conclusion of practice, participating crews moved onto the annual Pit Stop Challenge.

Top practice speeds
Pos	No.	Driver	Team	Engine	Speed (mph)	Speed (km/h)
1	11	(Japan) Takuma Sato	Chip Ganassi Racing	Honda	227.855	366.697
2	9	(New Zealand) Scott Dixon	Chip Ganassi Racing	Honda	227.285	365.780
3	12	(Australia) Will Power	Team Penske	Chevrolet	226.953	365.245
Official Report

== Pit Stop Challenge ==
The 44th annual Pit Stop Challenge was scheduled for Friday, May 26 after the completion of Carb Day practice. 16 competing crews were announced for the event the day before. Chip Ganassi Racing won the pit stop competition with Scott Dixon's car, defeating Team Penske with Will Power's car in the best-of-three final. It was the fourth win in the pit stop challenge for Chip Ganassi Racing as well as the fourth for Dixon in the competition.

Round 1
12	Will Power (Team Penske)	12.544
24	Graham Rahal (Dreyer & Reinbold)	12.717
23	Ryan Hunter-Reay (Dreyer & Reinbold)	13.335
5	Pato O'Ward (Arrow McLaren	14.409
60	Simon Pagenaud (Meyer Shank Racing)	18.455
30	Jack Harvey; Rahal Letterman)	13.525
21	Rinus VeeKay (Ed Carpenter Racing)	13.369
27	Kyle Kirkwood (Andretti Autosport)	13.741
26	Colton Herta (Andretti Autosport)	15.931
3	Scott McLaughlin (Team Penske)	13.471
6	Felix Rosenqvist (Arrow McLaren)	13.219
06	Hélio Castroneves (Meyer Shank Racing)	13.621
45	Christian Lundgaard; Rahal Letterman)	13.190
10	Álex Palou (Chip Ganassi Racing)	16.225
9	Scott Dixon (Chip Ganassi Racing)	12.066
77	Callum Ilott (Juncos Hollinger Racing)	14.464

Quarterfinals
12	Will Power (Team Penske)	12.683
23	Ryan Hunter-Reay (Dreyer & Reinbold)	13.296
30	Jack Harvey; Rahal Letterman)	13.376
21	Rinus VeeKay (Ed Carpenter Racing)	16.775
3	Scott McLaughlin (Team Penske)	12.008
6	Felix Rosenqvist (Arrow McLaren)	11.933
45	Christian Lundgaard; Rahal Letterman)	13.924
9	Scott Dixon (Chip Ganassi Racing)	11.582

Semifinals
12	Will Power (Team Penske)	11.336
30	Jack Harvey; Rahal Letterman)	12.293
6	Felix Rosenqvist (Arrow McLaren)	12.334
9	Scott Dixon (Chip Ganassi Racing)	11.411

Finals (best of 3)
12	Will Power (Team Penske)	12.047	11.829	12.552	1
9	Scott Dixon (Chip Ganassi Racing)	11.561	11.947	11.012	2

- Official Results

== Starting grid ==
Row	Inside		Middle		Outside	
1	10	(Spain) Álex Palou	21	(Netherlands) Rinus VeeKay	6	(Sweden) Felix Rosenqvist
2	14	(United States) Santino Ferrucci	5	(Mexico) Pato O'Ward	9	(New Zealand) Scott Dixon W
3	7	(United States) Alexander Rossi W	11	(Japan) Takuma Sato W	66	(Brazil) Tony Kanaan W
4	8	(Sweden) Marcus Ericsson W	55	(Denmark) Benjamin Pedersen R	12	(Australia) Will Power W
5	33	(United States) Ed Carpenter	3	(New Zealand) Scott McLaughlin	27	(United States) Kyle Kirkwood
6	20	(United States) Conor Daly	2	(United States) Josef Newgarden	23	(United States) Ryan Hunter-Reay W
7	28	(France) Romain Grosjean	06	(Brazil) Hélio Castroneves W	26	(United States) Colton Herta
8	60	(France) Simon Pagenaud W	18	(United States) David Malukas	98	(United States) Marco Andretti
9	29	(Canada) Devlin DeFrancesco	78	(Argentina) Agustín Canapino R	77	(United Kingdom) Callum Ilott
10	50	(United States) R. C. Enerson R	44	(United Kingdom) Katherine Legge	45	(Denmark) Christian Lundgaard
11	51	(United States) Sting Ray Robb R	30	(United Kingdom) Jack Harvey	24	(United States) Graham Rahal^{1}

Failed to qualify/Withdrawn

No.	Driver	Team	Reason
15	(United States) Graham Rahal	Rahal Letterman Lanigan Racing	Fourth fastest in Last Chance Qualifying. Bumped from the field.
24	(United Kingdom) Stefan Wilson	Dreyer & Reinbold Racing / Cusick Motorsports	Injured in post-qualifying practice. Withdrawn

^{1} Stefan Wilson qualified car #24, but was injured in post-qualifying practice and forced to withdraw. On May 23, Graham Rahal was named as his replacement. By IndyCar rules, the entry was moved to the back of the starting grid after the driver change

R Indianapolis 500 rookie
W Indianapolis 500 winner

== Race report ==
- Weather: 80 °F (27 °C), Mostly cloudy

=== First half ===
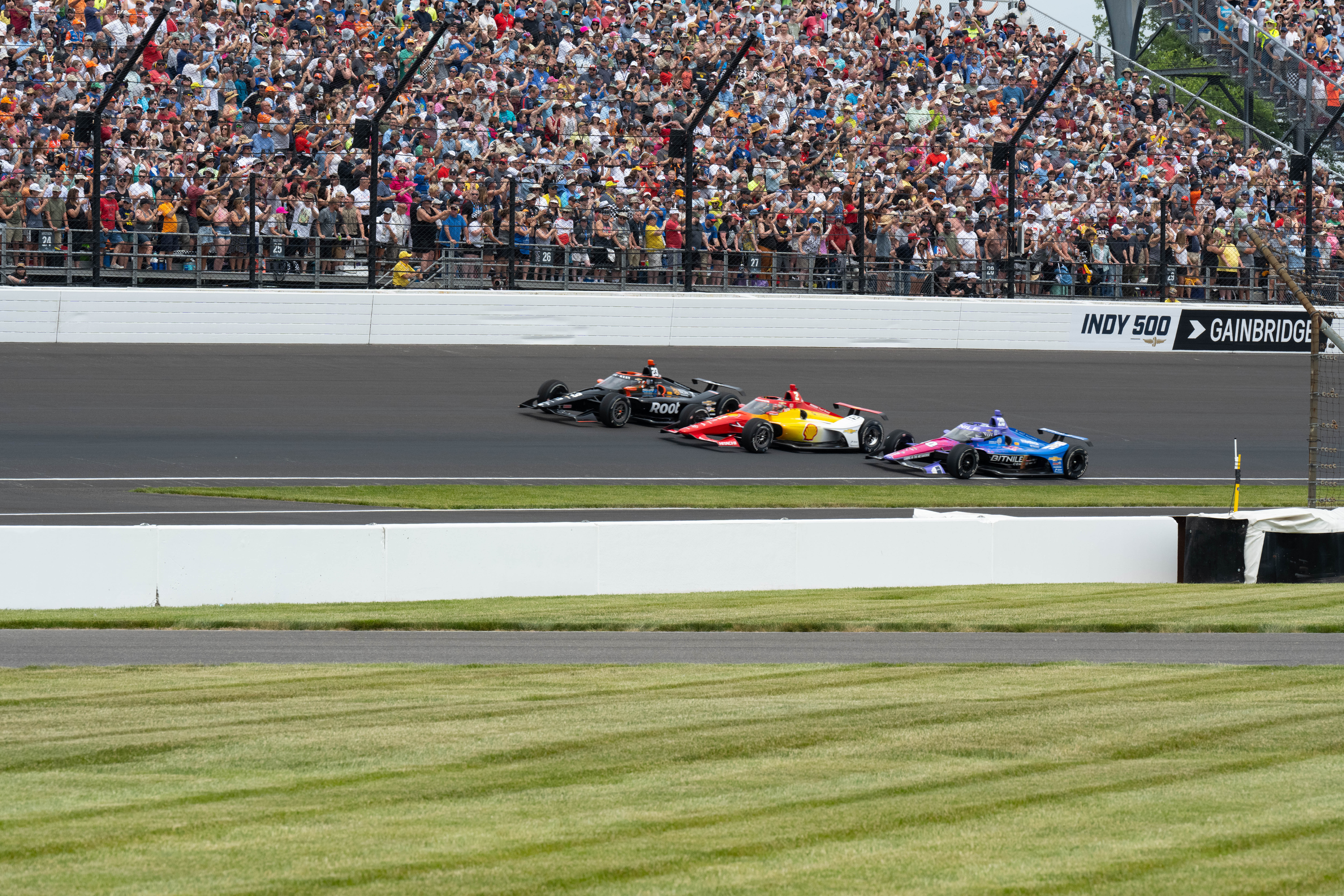
The cars on the sixth row of the starting grid: #20 Conor Daly, #2 Josef Newgarden, #23 Ryan Hunter-Reay

Prior to the race start, Graham Rahal suffered problems with the battery of his car. His crew was able to get the battery changed, but not before two laps of the race had already been completed.

At the start, Álex Palou took the lead of the race ahead of Rinus VeeKay and Felix Rosenqvist, while Scott Dixon moved into fourth. As the first run progressed, Palou and VeeKay swapped the lead with each other several times. Behind, Dixon began to suffer a vibration in one of his tires after 20 laps, which caused him to drop down to 16th position before finally making a pit stop to change the tires at lap 27. Shortly after, the first round of scheduled pit stops occurred, with the top two runners emerging in the same order, while Santino Ferrucci moved into third. During the pit sequence, Katherine Legge lost control of her car leaving her pit stall, spun, and hit the inside pit wall. Legge attempted to continue in the race for a few more laps, but was ultimately forced to retire after the incident. The second sequence of pit stops came beginning at lap 60, during which Arrow McLaren teammates Rosenqvist and Pato O'Ward moved into the lead of the race as the result of better fuel mileage than the cars ahead of them. O'Ward and Rosenqvist then swapped the lead with each other during the duration of the stint.

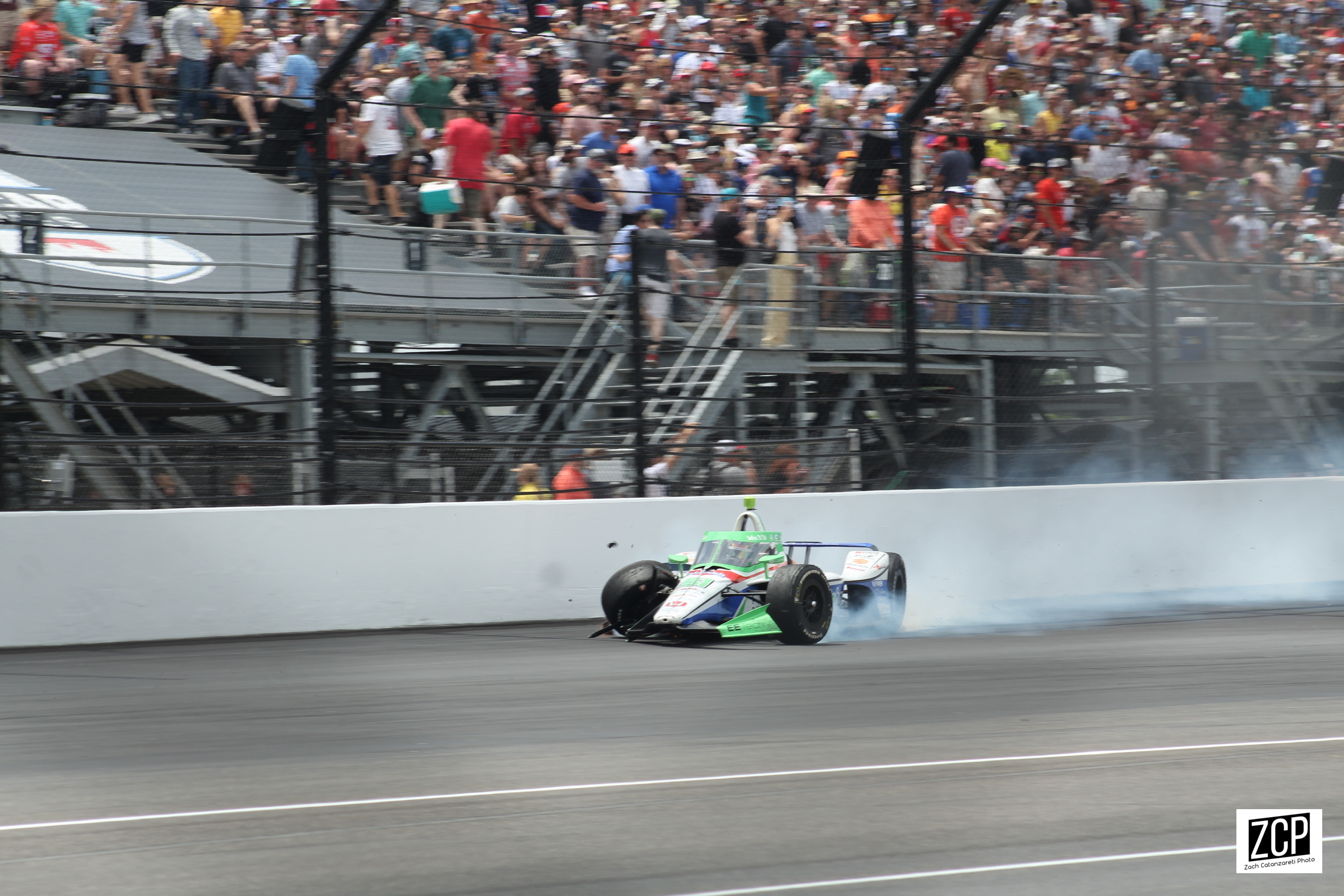
Sting Ray Robb caused the first caution period of the race after an accident in Turn 1.

The first caution period of the day came at lap 91, when Sting Ray Robb slid wide and crashed into the outside wall of turn 1 after being passed by Graham Rahal. Robb was uninjured in the accident. During the caution, most drivers elected to make pit stops. During the stops, Rinus VeeKay lost control of his car exiting his pit stall and spun, collecting Álex Palou in the process. While both of the early leaders were able to continue in the race, Palou dropped deep in the field after being forced to change the front wing on his car from the damage, while VeeKay received a drive-through penalty for causing the incident. Neither driver led for the remainder of the race. Rosenqvist, O'Ward, and Ferrucci led drivers off of pit lane, while Callum Ilott took the lead of the race by being the only driver not to pit under the caution.

=== Second half ===
Racing resumed on lap 100, with Rosenqvist and O'Ward passing Ilott immediately to take the lead of the race again. Further behind, Marcus Ericsson and Josef Newgarden had excellent restarts, moving forward several spots to take fifth and sixth respectively. After a few laps, action calmed again and Rosenqvist and O'Ward resumed their swapping of the lead. With the previous pit stop coming with awkward timing for strategy, the pace of the race slowed greatly as teams tried to reach their target fuel window, with laps being turned at only 207 mph (333 km/h) for several laps. Pits stops came again starting at lap 132. Rosenqvist emerged as the leader, but O'Ward suffered a slow stop that dropped him back. Newgarden and Ericsson emerged from the pits second and third, but both passed Rosenqvist shortly after, and Ericsson then passed Newgarden for the lead. Alexander Rossi moved to fourth place, while Santino Ferrucci ran fifth. During the pit stops, an incident occurred in the pit lane when Colton Herta left his stall while Romain Grosjean was entering his, causing the two to collide. Both continued in the race, though losing significant time.

The second caution period of the race came on lap 149, when Romain Grosjean lost control of his car in turn 2 and impacted the outside wall. During the caution, some cars chose to pit, most notably Pato O'Ward, who had problems refueling his car on the previous pit stop and so required an extra stop compared to the cars around him. Racing resumed at lap 156, with Newgarden taking the lead from Ericsson before both were passed by Ferrucci one lap later. Rosenqvist and Rossi ran fifth and sixth, while Kyle Kirkwood moved himself to sixth and Álex Palou moved to seventh after recovering from his earlier incident. The running order remained roughly the same until the start of the final round of pit stops starting at lap 169. Ferrucci lost time after a tire rolled out from his pit box during his stop; he avoided any time penalty for the infraction. Ericsson emerged the leader of the group that pitted, with Rosenqvist and Newgarden behind. Leading the race were the drivers who had pitted during the caution, with O'Ward leading until lap 180, when he pitted. O'Ward emerged from the pits in third place, and quickly moved past both Rosenqvist and Ericsson to be first of the cars not needing any more pit stops.

==== First red flag ====
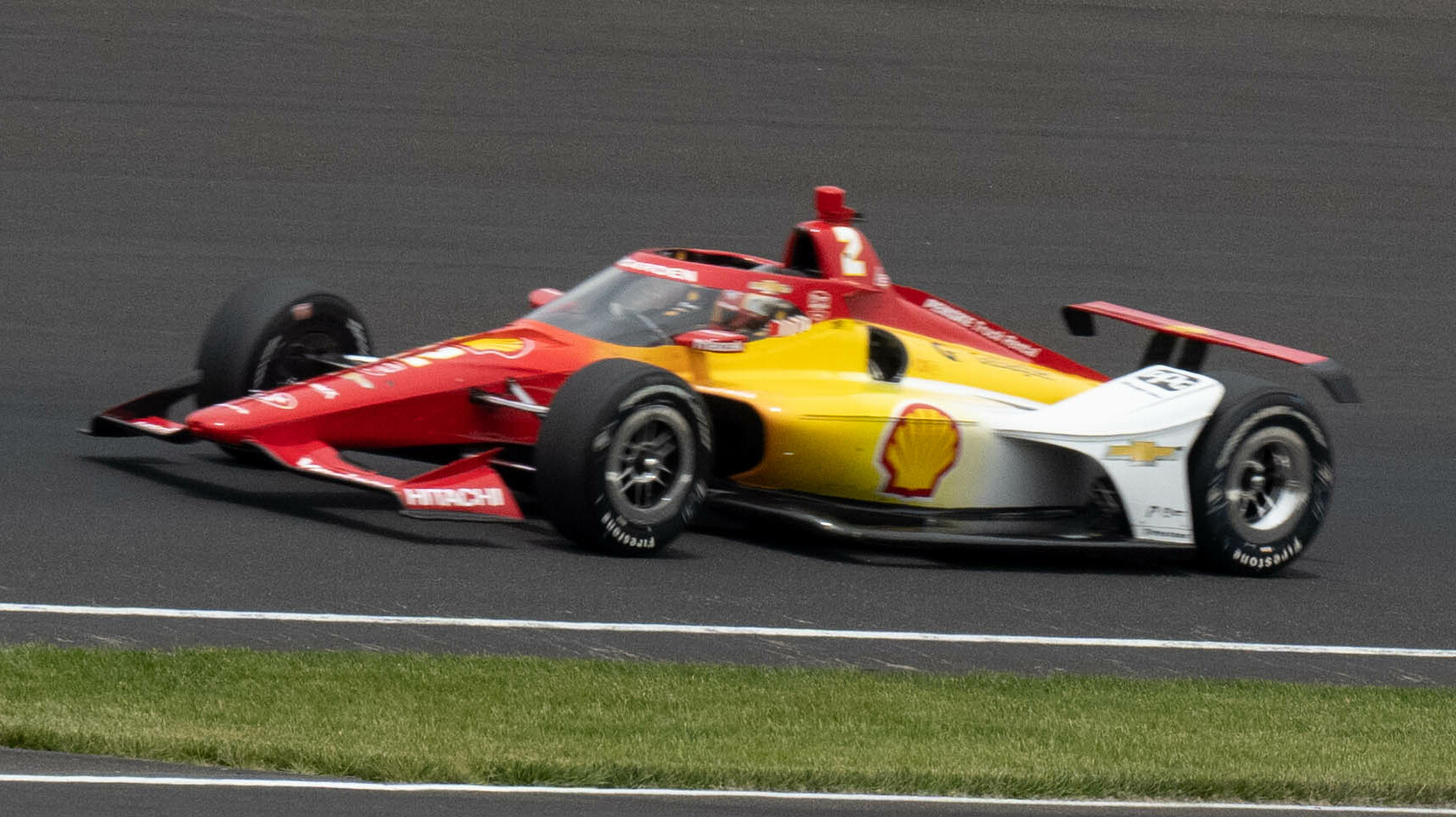
Josef Newgarden during the race.

On lap 184, Josef Newgarden passed Felix Rosenqvist entering turn 1. Rosenqvist slid wide in the wake of Newgarden's car and impacted the outside wall. Rosenqvist attempted to retain control of the car, but lost control entering turn two and spun. As he spun backwards onto the racing surface, Rosenqvist collected Kyle Kirkwood, which completely dislodged the left-rear tire on Kirkwood's car. Kirkwood impacted the outside wall in turn 2 heavily, with the impact causing the car to flip over and slide to a halt upside down. Neither Rosenqvist nor Kirkwood were injured in the accident. During the incident, the dislodged tire from Kirkwood's car was launched above the catch-fencing outside of turn 2 and out of the race track. The tire went over a grandstand and landed on the left front end of a Chevrolet Cruze that was parked in a lot between two sections of seating outside turn two. Robin Matthews, the owner of the damaged car, received a tour of the speedway as compensation. On June 1, four days after the race, Indianapolis Motor Speedway management announced that they would be presenting Matthews with a new car.

With the circuit needing significant cleanup from the accident, IndyCar officials halted the race with the red flag with 14 laps to go. This was done to provide an opportunity to finish the race under green, and to not waste too many laps circulating under the yellow flag. Ryan Hunter-Reay held the lead at the time of the red flag, but he along with Callum Ilott and Agustín Canapino would need to pit as soon as the race resumed.

==== Second red flag ====
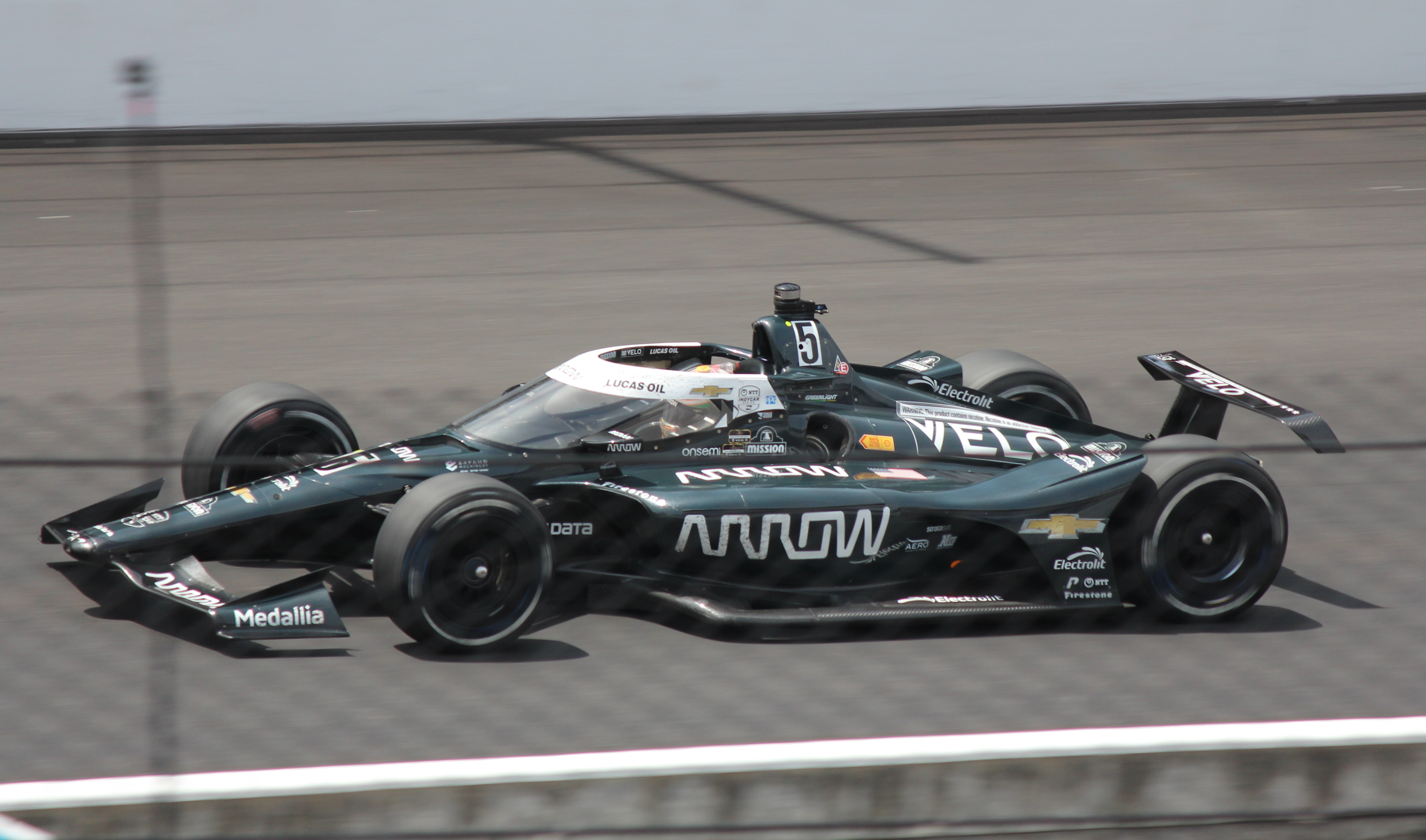
O'Ward leading the race

The race resumed under caution on lap 187. The three cars at the front needing a pit stop did so immediately, handing the lead to Pato O'Ward. The field was preparing to go back to green with 9 laps to go. However, the officials deemed that O'Ward was taking the field down too slowly, and waved off the restart by an extra lap.

Green flag racing resumed on lap 193 (8 laps to go), with Newgarden and Ericsson passing O'Ward heading into turn one. O'Ward attempted to pass Ericsson back at turn three, but lost control of his car, spun several times and impacted the outside wall. O'Ward's accident caused a chain of accidents behind. Scott McLaughlin collided with Simon Pagenaud as the field slowed to avoid O'Ward, which sent Pagenaud into the outside wall while McLaughlin suffered damage to the nose of his car. Agustín Canapino was forced into the grass trying to avoid McLaughlin, causing him to lose control of his car and also hit the wall. After the initial impact, Canapino's car was damaged to the point where he could no longer steer or slow it. As a result, Canapino hit the already stricken car of O'Ward, causing Canapino to briefly become airborne. None of the drivers involved were injured in the accident.

The leaders crossed the start/finish line, accepting the yellow with 7 laps to go. With another major cleanup needed, IndyCar officials again decided to put the red flag out again. The next time by, the field was parked in the pits under red. At the time of the second red, Newgarden led Ericsson with Santino Ferrucci third.

==== Third red flag and finish ====
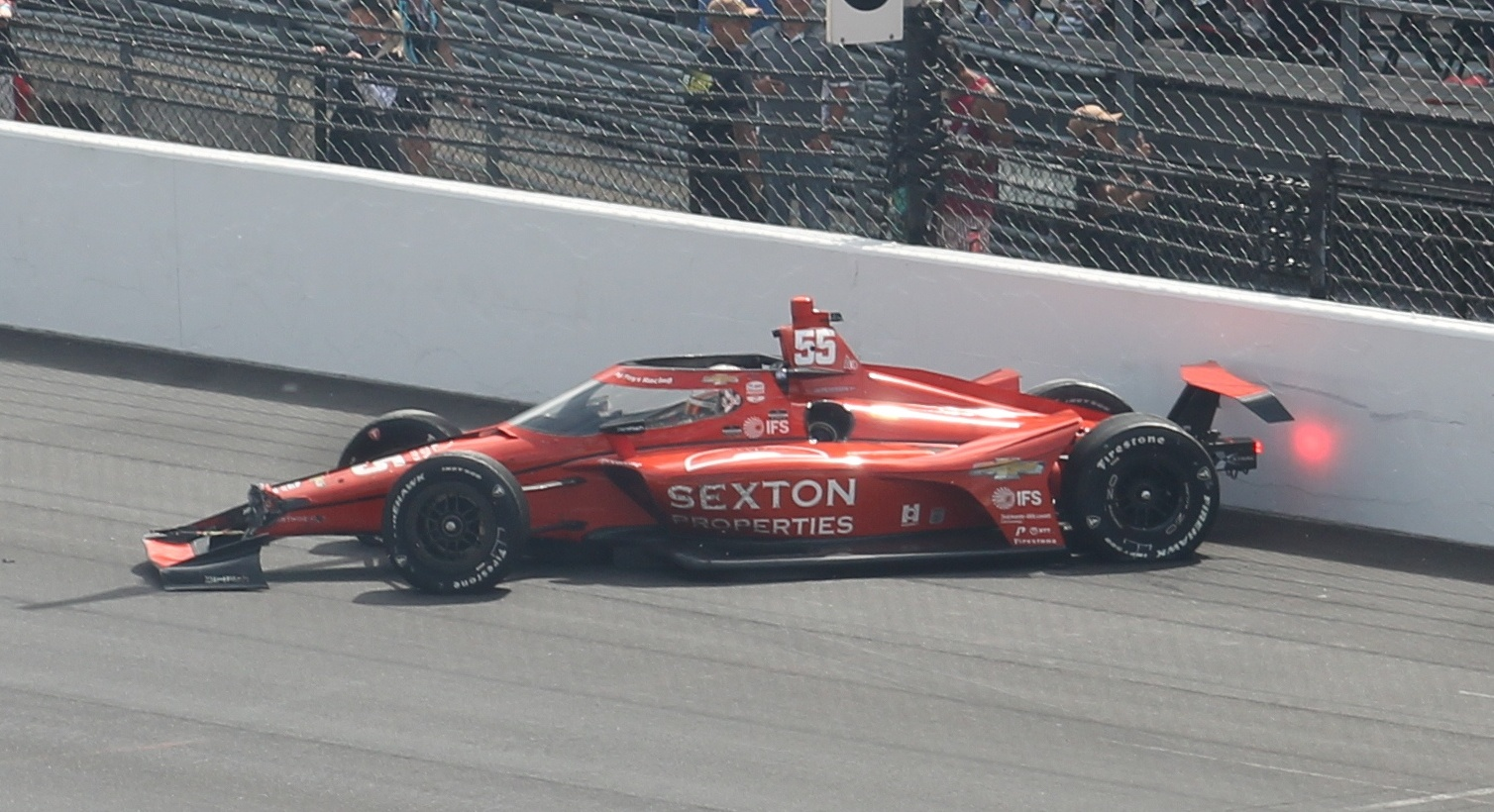
Benjamin Pedersen's damaged car after the Lap 196 accident.

The cars rolled from the pit with six laps to go. After two laps under yellow, the green came out with four laps to go. Ericsson immediately passed Newgarden, but another accident occurred just as Ericsson moved ahead. As cars exited turn four coming to the green flag, a five- car accident involving Christian Lundgaard, Ed Carpenter, Benjamin Pedersen, Graham Rahal, and Marco Andretti occurred, bringing out another caution period. IndyCar officials made the decision to red flag the race for a third time - the first time in Indianapolis 500 history that three late-race red flags occurred. As the red flag came with only two laps remaining in the race, officials decided that the race would restart as soon as cars reached the start finish line again for the final lap.

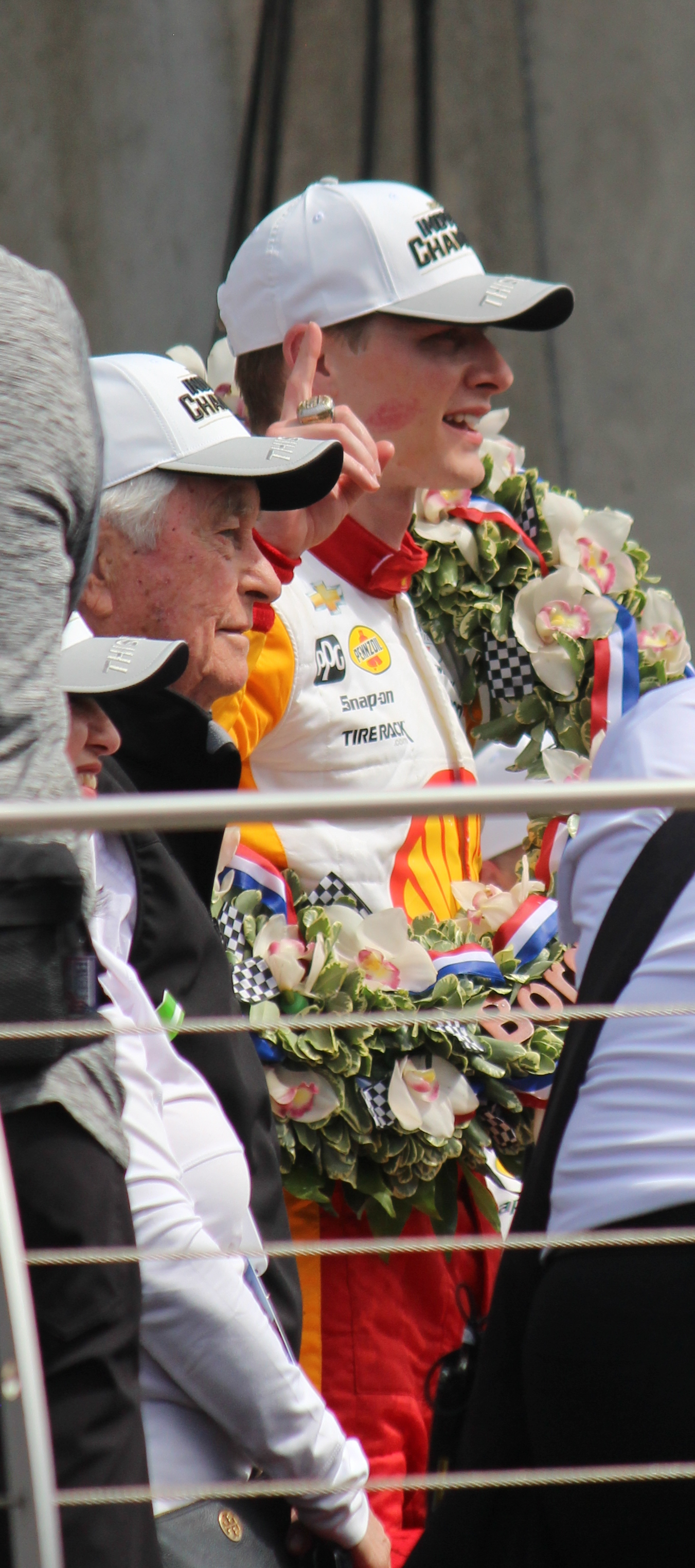
Newgarden in victory lane with Roger Penske after winning

The cars rolled from the pits one last time with two laps remaining. This provided them with just one lap to warm up their car and warm up their tires. The first time around racing resumed with the green flag and white flag flying together. It was the final lap with Ericsson getting an initial jump on Newgarden going into turn one. Newgarden was able to catch up to Ericsson and made a slingshot pass for the lead down the backstraight. He stayed in front for the remainder of the lap to win, securing his first Indianapolis 500 victory in his 12th start in the event. Newgarden's victory was the first for an American driver since 2016, while it was the 19th Indianapolis 500 victory for Team Penske. After winning, Newgarden stopped on the front straight, climbed from his car, then climbed through a gap in the catch fencing to celebrate with fans before returning for the official celebration ceremony in the winners circle. In winning, Newgarden became the first driver from Tennessee to take victory in the 500. Newgarden earned $3.666 million for winning from a record purse of $17,021,500. As well, his win made Caitlyn Brown, his left-front tire changer, the first known woman to be part of an over-the-wall tire-changing pit crew for a driver while that driver won the Indy 500. Second-place finisher Marcus Ericsson became the first defending winner to finish second since Hélio Castroneves in 2003. Santino Ferrucci in third place achieved his career best finish in the race and achieved the best finish for A. J. Foyt Racing since 2000. Despite being involved in the final accident, Benjamin Pedersen was the highest finishing rookie in the race in 21st and was named Rookie of the Year for 2023.

The decision to red flag the race for a one-lap run to the finish was met with criticism from runner-up finisher Marcus Ericsson, who called the ruling "unfair and dangerous" and cited that IndyCar had never done a restart in that way any time prior. Other competitors, such as 3rd-place finisher Santino Ferrucci and 16th-place finisher Tony Kanaan felt that IndyCar's decision was the correct one, citing complaints from previous editions of the race about ending under caution periods.

== Box score ==
Finish	No.	Driver	Team	Chassis	Engine	Laps	Status	Pit Stops	Grid	Pts.^{1}
1	2	(United States) Josef Newgarden	Team Penske	Dallara UAK18	Chevrolet	200	168.193 mph	5	17	51
2	8	(Sweden) Marcus Ericsson W	Chip Ganassi Racing	Dallara UAK18	Honda	200	+0.0974	5	10	44
3	14	(United States) Santino Ferrucci	A. J. Foyt Racing	Dallara UAK18	Chevrolet	200	+0.5273	5	4	45
4	10	(Spain) Álex Palou	Chip Ganassi Racing	Dallara UAK18	Honda	200	+0.7638	6	1	45
5	7	(United States) Alexander Rossi W	Arrow McLaren	Dallara UAK18	Chevrolet	200	+0.9934	5	7	37
6	9	(New Zealand) Scott Dixon W	Chip Ganassi Racing	Dallara UAK18	Honda	200	+1.4316	5	6	35
7	11	(Japan) Takuma Sato W	Chip Ganassi Racing	Dallara UAK18	Honda	200	+1.5770	6	8	32
8	20	(United States) Conor Daly	Ed Carpenter Racing	Dallara UAK18	Chevrolet	200	+1.8855	5	16	24
9	26	(United States) Colton Herta	Andretti Autosport w/ Curb-Agajanian	Dallara UAK18	Honda	200	+2.2248	6	21	23
10	21	(Netherlands) Rinus VeeKay	Ed Carpenter Racing	Dallara UAK18	Chevrolet	200	+3.2648	6	2	32
11	23	(United States) Ryan Hunter-Reay W	Dreyer & Reinbold Racing	Dallara UAK18	Chevrolet	200	+3.4223	6	18	20
12	77	(United Kingdom) Callum Ilott	Juncos Hollinger Racing	Dallara UAK18	Chevrolet	200	+4.0470	6	27	19
13	29	(Canada) Devlin DeFrancesco	Andretti Steinbrenner Autosport	Dallara UAK18	Honda	200	+4.7432	5	25	17
14	3	(New Zealand) Scott McLaughlin	Team Penske	Dallara UAK18	Chevrolet	200	+5.0045	6	14	16
15	06	(Brazil) Hélio Castroneves W	Meyer Shank Racing	Dallara UAK18	Honda	200	+5.4631	7	20	16
16	66	(Brazil) Tony Kanaan W	Arrow McLaren	Dallara UAK18	Chevrolet	200	+5.7158	7	9	18
17	98	(United States) Marco Andretti	Andretti Herta Autosport w/ Marco Andretti & Curb-Agajanian	Dallara UAK18	Honda	200	+8.9800	6	24	13
18	30	(United Kingdom) Jack Harvey	Rahal Letterman Lanigan Racing	Dallara UAK18	Honda	199	-1 Lap	7	32	12
19	45	(Denmark) Christian Lundgaard	Rahal Letterman Lanigan Racing	Dallara UAK18	Honda	198	-2 Laps	8	30	11
20	33	(United States) Ed Carpenter	Ed Carpenter Racing	Dallara UAK18	Chevrolet	197	Crash	6	13	10
21	55	(Denmark) Benjamin Pedersen R	A. J. Foyt Racing	Dallara UAK18	Chevrolet	196	Crash	7	11	11
22	24	(United States) Graham Rahal	Dreyer & Reinbold Racing	Dallara UAK18	Chevrolet	195	-5 Laps	6	33	8
23	12	(Australia) Will Power W	Team Penske	Dallara UAK18	Chevrolet	195	-5 Laps	6	12	9
24	5	(Mexico) Pato O'Ward	Arrow McLaren	Dallara UAK18	Chevrolet	192	Crash	6	5	17
25	60	(France) Simon Pagenaud W	Meyer Shank Racing	Dallara UAK18	Honda	192	Crash	5	22	5
26	78	(Argentina) Agustín Canapino R	Juncos Hollinger Racing	Dallara UAK18	Chevrolet	192	Crash	6	26	5
27	6	(Sweden) Felix Rosenqvist	Arrow McLaren	Dallara UAK18	Chevrolet	183	Crash	5	3	16
28	27	(United States) Kyle Kirkwood	Andretti Autosport	Dallara UAK18	Honda	183	Crash	5	15	5
29	18	(United States) David Malukas	Dale Coyne Racing w/ HMD Motorsports	Dallara UAK18	Honda	160	Crash	7	23	5
30	28	(France) Romain Grosjean	Andretti Autosport	Dallara UAK18	Honda	149	Crash	4	19	5
31	51	(United States) Sting Ray Robb R	Dale Coyne Racing w/ Rick Ware Racing	Dallara UAK18	Honda	90	Crash	2	31	5
32	50	(United States) R. C. Enerson R	Abel Motorsports	Dallara UAK18	Chevrolet	75	Mechanical	3	28	5
33	44	(United Kingdom) Katherine Legge	Rahal Letterman Lanigan Racing	Dallara UAK18	Honda	41	Crash	4	29	5
Official Report

W Former Indianapolis 500 winner

R Indianapolis 500 Rookie

All entrants utilized Firestone tires.

^{1} Points include qualification points from time trials, 1 point for leading a lap, and 2 points for most laps led.

=== Race statistics ===
Lap Leaders
Laps	Leader
1–2	Álex Palou
3	Rinus VeeKay
4–9	Álex Palou
10–14	Rinus VeeKay
15–22	Álex Palou
23–27	Rinus VeeKay
28–29	Álex Palou
30–31	Rinus VeeKay
32	Felix Rosenqvist
33–34	Alexander Rossi
35–39	Álex Palou
40–47	Rinus VeeKay
48–60	Álex Palou
61–63	Rinus VeeKay
64–65	Felix Rosenqvist
66	Pato O'Ward
67	Will Power
68	Colton Herta
69	Felix Rosenqvist
70–78	Pato O'Ward
79–81	Felix Rosenqvist
82–89	Pato O'Ward
90–94	Felix Rosenqvist
95–99	Callum Ilott
100–101	Felix Rosenqvist
102	Pato O'Ward
103–107	Felix Rosenqvist

Lap Leaders (con't)
Laps	Leader
108–109	Pato O'Ward
110–113	Felix Rosenqvist
114–115	Pato O'Ward
116–119	Felix Rosenqvist
120–122	Pato O'Ward
123–124	Felix Rosenqvist
125–128	Pato O'Ward
129–131	Felix Rosenqvist
132	Santino Ferrucci
133–134	Marcus Ericsson
135	Hélio Castroneves
136	Felix Rosenqvist
137–156	Marcus Ericsson
157	Josef Newgarden
158	Marcus Ericsson
159–168	Santino Ferrucci
169–170	Marcus Ericsson
171–172	Alexander Rossi
173–174	Takuma Sato
175–179	Pato O'Ward
180–187	Ryan Hunter-Reay
188–191	Pato O'Ward
192	Marcus Ericsson
193–195	Josef Newgarden
196–199	Marcus Ericsson
200	Josef Newgarden

Total laps led
Driver	Laps
Pato O'Ward	39
Álex Palou	36
Felix Rosenqvist	33
Marcus Ericsson	30
Rinus VeeKay	24
Santino Ferrucci	11
Ryan Hunter-Reay	8
Josef Newgarden	5
Callum Ilott	5
Alexander Rossi	4
Takuma Sato	2
Will Power	1
Hélio Castroneves	1
Colton Herta	1

Cautions: 5 for 34 laps
Laps	Reason
92–99	Robb crash in turn 1
150–155	Grosjean crash in turn 2
185–191	Rosenqvist, Kirkwood crash in turn 2 (red flag)
193–195	O'Ward, Pagenaud, Canapino crash in turn 3 (red flag)
196–198	Petersen, Carpenter crash on mainstretch (red flag)

== Broadcasting ==
=== Television ===
The race was televised on NBC and Peacock Premium in the United States. Mike Tirico and Danica Patrick returned for pre-race and post-race coverage, as they had together since 2019. Leigh Diffey, Townsend Bell, and James Hinchcliffe were the booth announcers for the race. Two additional hours of pre-race coverage on race day morning was carried exclusively on Peacock.

On May 8, 2023, it was confirmed that, in line with longstanding policy that had been suspended during the COVID-19 pandemic, the live broadcast would be blacked-out in the Indianapolis area on both local television and Peacock, marking the first Indy 500 local blackout since the 2019 Indianapolis 500.

NBC
Booth announcers	Pre/Post-race	Pit/garage reporters
Announcer: Leigh Diffey; Color: Townsend Bell; Color: James Hinchcliffe	NBC Host: Mike Tirico; Studio Analyst: Danica Patrick; Analyst/Features: Dale Earnhardt Jr. Analyst/Features: Steve Letarte	Marty Snider; Dillon Welch; Dave Burns; Kevin Lee

In the United Kingdom, the race was simulcast on Sky Sports Arena, and later on Sky Sports F1 following the conclusion of the 2023 Monaco Grand Prix. Both Sky Sports broadcasts ran uninterrupted from commercials, switching to a local presenting team during US commercial breaks, while keeping the same video feed. Leading the local presenting team was freelance commentator and broadcaster Tom Gaymor, alongside Mark Blundell and former Indianapolis 500 driver Simona de Silvestro as analysts.

=== Radio ===
The race was broadcast on radio by the Indianapolis Motor Speedway Radio Network. The chief announcer or "Voice of the 500" for the eighth consecutive year was Mark Jaynes with Davey Hamilton as driver analyst.

IMS Radio Network
Booth Announcers	Turn Reporters	Pit/garage reporters
Chief Announcer: Mark Jaynes; Driver expert: Davey Hamilton	Turn 1: Nick Yeoman; Turn 2: Michael Young; Turn 3: Jake Query; Turn 4: Chris Denari	Alex Wollf; Scott Sander; Rob Blackman; Ryan Myrehn

Previous race: 2023 GMR Grand Prix	IndyCar Series; 2023 season	Next race: 2023 Chevrolet Detroit Grand Prix
Previous race: 2022 Indianapolis 500	Indianapolis 500	Next race: 2024 Indianapolis 500
