= 2023 Firestone Grand Prix of St. Petersburg =

Indycar race held in St. Petersburg, Florida

(United States) 2023 Firestone Grand Prix of St. Petersburg
Race details
1st round of the 2023 IndyCar season
Next race →
- Layout of the Streets of St. Petersburg
- Date: March 5, 2023
- Official name: Firestone Grand Prix of St. Petersburg
- Location: Streets of St. Petersburg, St. Petersburg, Florida
- Course: Temporary street circuit 1.800 mi / 2.897 km
- Distance: 100 laps 180.000 mi / 289.682 km

Pole position
- Driver: (France) Romain Grosjean (Andretti Autosport)
- Time: 00:59.5532

Fastest lap
- Driver: (Spain) Álex Palou (Chip Ganassi Racing)
- Time: 01:01.5104 (on lap 68 of 100)

Podium
- First: (Sweden) Marcus Ericsson (Chip Ganassi Racing)
- Second: (Mexico) Pato O'Ward (Arrow McLaren)
- Third: (New Zealand) Scott Dixon (Chip Ganassi Racing)

Chronology
Previous	Next
2022	2024

The 2023 Firestone Grand Prix of St. Petersburg was the first round of the 2023 IndyCar season. The race was held on March 5, 2023, in St. Petersburg, Florida on the Streets of St. Petersburg. The race consisted of 100 laps and was won by Marcus Ericsson.

== Entry list ==
Key	Meaning
R	Rookie
W	Past winner

No.	Driver	Team	Engine
2	(United States) Josef Newgarden W	Team Penske	Chevrolet
3	(New Zealand) Scott McLaughlin W	Team Penske	Chevrolet
5	(Mexico) Patricio O'Ward	Arrow McLaren	Chevrolet
06	(Brazil) Hélio Castroneves W	Meyer Shank Racing	Honda
6	(Sweden) Felix Rosenqvist	Arrow McLaren	Chevrolet
7	(United States) Alexander Rossi	Arrow McLaren	Chevrolet
8	(Sweden) Marcus Ericsson	Chip Ganassi Racing	Honda
9	(New Zealand) Scott Dixon	Chip Ganassi Racing	Honda
10	(Spain) Álex Palou	Chip Ganassi Racing	Honda
11	(New Zealand) Marcus Armstrong R	Chip Ganassi Racing	Honda
12	(Australia) Will Power W	Team Penske	Chevrolet
14	(United States) Santino Ferrucci	A.J. Foyt Enterprises	Chevrolet
15	(United States) Graham Rahal W	Rahal Letterman Lanigan Racing	Honda
18	(United States) David Malukas	Dale Coyne Racing with HMD Motorsports	Honda
20	(United States) Conor Daly	Ed Carpenter Racing	Chevrolet
21	(Netherlands) Rinus VeeKay	Ed Carpenter Racing	Chevrolet
26	(United States) Colton Herta W	Andretti Autosport with Curb-Agajanian	Honda
27	(United States) Kyle Kirkwood	Andretti Autosport	Honda
28	(France) Romain Grosjean	Andretti Autosport	Honda
29	(Canada) Devlin DeFrancesco	Andretti Steinbrenner Autosport	Honda
30	(United Kingdom) Jack Harvey	Rahal Letterman Lanigan Racing	Honda
45	(Denmark) Christian Lundgaard	Rahal Letterman Lanigan Racing	Honda
51	(United States) Sting Ray Robb R	Dale Coyne Racing with Rick Ware Racing	Honda
55	(Denmark) Benjamin Pedersen R	A.J. Foyt Enterprises	Chevrolet
60	(France) Simon Pagenaud	Meyer Shank Racing	Honda
77	(United Kingdom) Callum Ilott	Juncos Hollinger Racing	Chevrolet
78	(Argentina) Agustín Canapino R	Juncos Hollinger Racing	Chevrolet

== Practice ==
=== Practice 1 ===
Top Practice Speeds
Pos	No.	Driver	Team	Engine	Lap Time
1	9	(New Zealand) Scott Dixon	Chip Ganassi Racing	Honda	01:01.6145
2	26	(United States) Colton Herta W	Andretti Autosport with Curb-Agajanian	Honda	01:01.6475
3	10	(Spain) Álex Palou	Chip Ganassi Racing	Honda	01:01.6790

=== Practice 2 ===
Top Practice Speeds
Pos	No.	Driver	Team	Engine	Lap Time
1	26	(United States) Colton Herta W	Andretti Autosport with Curb-Agajanian	Honda	01:00.0779
2	3	(New Zealand) Scott McLaughlin W	Team Penske	Chevrolet	01:00.2511
3	21	(Netherlands) Rinus VeeKay	Ed Carpenter Racing	Chevrolet	01:00.4601

== Qualifying ==
=== Qualifying classification ===
Pos	No.	Driver	Team	Engine	Time				Final grid
Pos	No.	Driver	Team	Engine	Round 1		Round 2	Round 3	Final grid
Pos	No.	Driver	Team	Engine	Group 1	Group 2	Round 2	Round 3	Final grid
1	28	(France) Romain Grosjean	Andretti Autosport	Honda	N/A	00:59.8790	00:59.7320	**00:59.5532**	1
2	26	(United States) Colton Herta **W**	Andretti Autosport with Curb-Agajanian	Honda	N/A	00:59.8220	**00:59.5442**	00:59.9687	2
3	5	(Mexico) Pato O'Ward	Arrow McLaren	Chevrolet	01:00.1146	N/A	00:59.7367	01:00.0163	3
4	8	(Sweden) Marcus Ericsson	Chip Ganassi Racing	Honda	01:00.2018	N/A	00:59.7624	01:00.4435	4
5	3	(New Zealand) Scott McLaughlin **W**	Team Penske	Chevrolet	01:00.1201	N/A	00:59.7686	No Time	5
6	27	(United States) Kyle Kirkwood	Andretti Autosport	Honda	01:00.0451	N/A	00:59.6357	No Time	6
7	10	(Spain) Álex Palou	Chip Ganassi Racing	Honda	N/A	00:59.8879	00:59.7781	N/A	7
8	6	(Sweden) Felix Rosenqvist	Arrow McLaren	Chevrolet	**00:59.9396**	N/A	00:59.7971	N/A	8
9	9	(New Zealand) Scott Dixon	Chip Ganassi Racing	Honda	N/A	**00:59.8213**	00:59.8010	N/A	9
10	12	(Australia) Will Power **W**	Team Penske	Chevrolet	N/A	01:00.0211	00:59.9482	N/A	10
11	45	(Denmark) Christian Lundgaard	Rahal Letterman Lanigan Racing	Honda	01:00.0121	N/A	00:59.9618	N/A	11
12	7	(United States) Alexander Rossi	Arrow McLaren	Chevrolet	N/A	00:59.9527	01:00.0040	N/A	12
13	11	(New Zealand) Marcus Armstrong **R**	Chip Ganassi Racing	Honda	01:00.3158	N/A	N/A	N/A	13
14	2	(United States) Josef Newgarden **W**	Team Penske	Chevrolet	N/A	01:00.0605	N/A	N/A	14
15	06	(Brazil) Hélio Castroneves **W**	Meyer Shank Racing	Honda	01:00.5049	N/A	N/A	N/A	15
16	18	(United States) David Malukas	Dale Coyne Racing with HMD Motorsports	Honda	N/A	01:00.0796	N/A	N/A	16
17	14	(United States) Santino Ferrucci	A. J. Foyt Enterprises	Chevrolet	01:00.5301	N/A	N/A	N/A	17
18	29	(Canada) Devlin DeFrancesco	Andretti Steinbrenner Autosport	Honda	N/A	01:00.1798	N/A	N/A	18
19	30	(United Kingdom) Jack Harvey	Rahal Letterman Lanigan Racing	Honda	01:00.7270	N/A	N/A	N/A	19
20	15	(United States) Graham Rahal **W**	Rahal Letterman Lanigan Racing	Honda	N/A	01:00.3714	N/A	N/A	20
21	78	(Argentina) Agustín Canapino **R**	Juncos Hollinger Racing	Chevrolet	01:01.0692	N/A	N/A	N/A	21
22	77	(United Kingdom) Callum Ilott	Juncos Hollinger Racing	Chevrolet	N/A	01:00.3868	N/A	N/A	22
23	51	(United States) Sting Ray Robb **R**	Dale Coyne Racing with Rick Ware Racing	Honda	01:02.3711	N/A	N/A	N/A	23
24	21	(Netherlands) Rinus VeeKay	Ed Carpenter Racing	Chevrolet	N/A	01:00.4831	N/A	N/A	24
25	60	(France) Simon Pagenaud	Meyer Shank Racing	Honda	06:37.4112	N/A	N/A	N/A	25
26	20	(United States) Conor Daly	Ed Carpenter Racing	Chevrolet	N/A	01:00.6066	N/A	N/A	26
27	55	(Denmark) Benjamin Pedersen **R**	A. J. Foyt Enterprises	Chevrolet	N/A	01:01.4355	N/A	N/A	27

Notes

- **Bold text** indicates fastest time set in session.

== Warmup ==
Top Practice Speeds
Pos	No.	Driver	Team	Engine	Lap Time
1	26	(United States) Colton Herta W	Andretti Autosport with Curb-Agajanian	Honda	01:00.5886
2	27	(United States) Kyle Kirkwood	Andretti Autosport	Honda	01:00.7213
3	9	(New Zealand) Scott Dixon	Chip Ganassi Racing	Honda	01:00.8377

== Race ==
The race started at 12:30 PM ET on March 5, 2023. Romain Grosjean took pole position, the second pole of his IndyCar career, ahead of Andretti teammate Colton Herta. Grosjean led away from the start however the race was red-flagged due to an incident involving Devlin DeFrancesco, who was launched into the air following contact with rookie Benjamin Pedersen. Grosjean would lead 31 laps, but retired on lap 71 following an incident with defending St. Petersburg race winner Scott McLaughlin. McLaughlin, who had just exited the pits in the lead of the race, attempted to defend against the charging Grosjean into turn 4, locking his cold rear tires. As a result, McLaughlin missed the apex of the corner and collided into Grosjean, sending them both into the tire barrier and ending Grosjean's race. Arrow McLaren's Pato O'Ward would take over the lead of the race, however his engine briefly shut off exiting turn 14 due to a 'plenum backfire' allowing Chip Ganassi Racing's Marcus Ericsson through into the lead. Ericsson would hold onto the lead to take his 4th IndyCar victory, and his first since the 106th Running of the Indianapolis 500. O'Ward would finish 2nd, with Ericsson's teammate Scott Dixon finishing 3rd, ahead of Alexander Rossi and Callum Ilott, the latter scoring his career best IndyCar finish. Ganassi's Marcus Armstrong was the highest-finishing rookie in 11th, just ahead of Argentine newcomer Agustín Canapino for Juncos Hollinger Racing.

=== Race classification ===
Pos	No.	Driver	Team	Engine	Laps	Time/Retired	Pit Stops	Grid	Laps Led	Pts.
1	8	(Sweden) Marcus Ericsson	Chip Ganassi Racing	Honda	100	2:05:30.7907	3	4	4	51
2	5	(Mexico) Pato O'Ward	Arrow McLaren	Chevrolet	100	+2.4113	3	3	23	41
3	9	(New Zealand) Scott Dixon	Chip Ganassi Racing	Honda	100	+2.9257	3	9	3	36
4	7	(United States) Alexander Rossi	Arrow McLaren	Chevrolet	100	+6.7689	3	12		32
5	77	(United Kingdom) Callum Ilott	Juncos Hollinger Racing	Chevrolet	100	+8.2650	3	22		30
6	15	(United States) Graham Rahal W	Rahal Letterman Lanigan Racing	Honda	100	+10.7671	3	20		28
7	12	(Australia) Will Power W	Team Penske	Chevrolet	100	+11.6798	3	10		26
8	10	(Spain) Álex Palou	Chip Ganassi Racing	Honda	100	+14.7244	3	7		24
9	45	(Denmark) Christian Lundgaard	Rahal Letterman Lanigan Racing	Honda	100	+14.9528	3	11		22
10	18	(United States) David Malukas	Dale Coyne Racing with HMD Motorsports	Honda	100	+15.4401	4	16	2	21
11	11	(New Zealand) Marcus Armstrong R	Chip Ganassi Racing	Honda	100	+15.8049	4	13		19
12	78	(Argentina) Agustín Canapino R	Juncos Hollinger Racing	Chevrolet	100	+28.1332	3	21		18
13	3	(New Zealand) Scott McLaughlin W	Team Penske	Chevrolet	99	+1 Lap	6	6	37	20
14	20	(United States) Conor Daly	Ed Carpenter Racing	Chevrolet	99	+1 Lap	5	26		16
15	27	(United States) Kyle Kirkwood	Andretti Autosport	Honda	97	+3 Laps	5	5		15
16	51	(United States) Sting Ray Robb R	Dale Coyne Racing with Rick Ware Racing	Honda	96	Off Course	6	23		14
17	2	(United States) Josef Newgarden W	Team Penske	Chevrolet	95	+5 Laps	4	14		13
18	28	(France) Romain Grosjean	Andretti Autosport	Honda	71	Contact	3	1	31	14
19	6	(Sweden) Felix Rosenqvist	Arrow McLaren	Chevrolet	51	Contact damage	3	8		11
20	26	(United States) Colton Herta W	Andretti Autosport with Curb-Agajanian	Honda	49	Contact	2	2		10
21	21	(Netherlands) Rinus VeeKay	Ed Carpenter Racing	Chevrolet	41	Contact	3	24		9
22	30	(United Kingdom) Jack Harvey	Rahal Letterman Lanigan Racing	Honda	41	Contact	2	19		8
23	06	(Brazil) Hélio Castroneves W	Meyer Shank Racing	Honda	0	Contact		15		7
24	14	(United States) Santino Ferrucci	A. J. Foyt Enterprises	Chevrolet	0	Contact		17		6
25	29	(Canada) Devlin DeFrancesco	Andretti Steinbrenner Autosport	Honda	0	Contact		18		5
26	60	(France) Simon Pagenaud	Meyer Shank Racing	Honda	0	Contact		25		5
27	55	(Denmark) Benjamin Pedersen R	A. J. Foyt Enterprises	Chevrolet	0	Contact		27		5
Fastest lap: (Spain) Álex Palou (Chip Ganassi Racing) – 01:01.5104 (lap 68)

== Championship standings after the race ==
Drivers' Championship standings

	Pos.	Driver	Points
Unchanged	1	(Sweden) Marcus Ericsson	51
Unchanged	2	(Mexico) Patricio O'Ward	41
Unchanged	3	(New Zealand) Scott Dixon	36
Unchanged	4	(United States) Alexander Rossi	32
Unchanged	5	(United Kingdom) Callum Ilott	30

Engine manufacturer standings

	Pos.	Manufacturer	Points
Unchanged	1	Honda	91
Unchanged	2	Chevrolet	72

- Note: Only the top five positions are included.

Previous race: 2022 Firestone Grand Prix of Monterey	IndyCar Series; 2023 season	Next race: 2023 PPG 375
Previous race: 2022 Firestone Grand Prix of St. Petersburg	Firestone Grand Prix of St. Petersburg	Next race: 2024 Firestone Grand Prix of St. Petersburg
