= List of red-flagged IndyCar Series races =

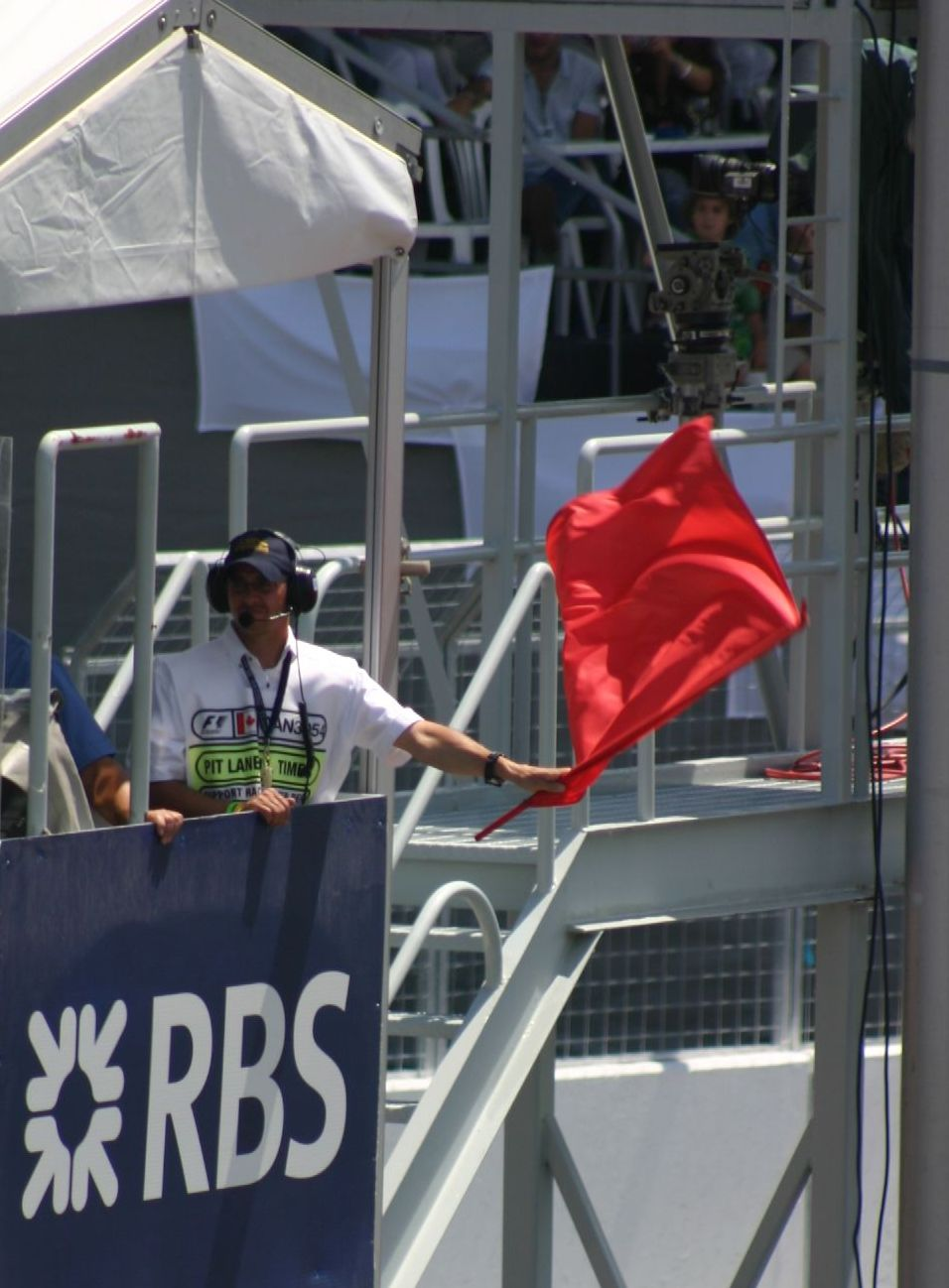
A red flag is shown to indicate an unscheduled stop to a race, usually for safety reasons.

The IndyCar Series is the highest class of North American open-wheel car racing, which has been conducted under the auspices of various sanctioning bodies since 1920 after two initial attempts in 1905 and 1916. The series is self-sanctioned by its parent company, IndyCar, LLC., which began in 1996 as the Indy Racing League (IRL) and was created by then Indianapolis Motor Speedway owner Tony George. The series' premier event is the Indianapolis 500, which was first held in 1911.

A red flag is shown when there has been a crash or the track conditions are poor enough to warrant the race being stopped. The flags are displayed by the marshals at various points around the circuit. An EM Marshalling System was introduced in 2022; it involves a display of flag signals in the driver's cockpit, which alerts them to the session's stoppage. Following a red flag being shown, the exit of the pit lane is closed immediately and all cars must slow down and proceed to the pit lane without overtaking, lining up at the pit exit. If 50% of the race distance has not been completed and the race cannot be resumed, no points are awarded.

Between 1996 and 2002, when the IndyCar Series was known as the Indy Racing League, six red flags were shown in six races, two of which were not resumed. Since the name change to the IndyCar Series in 2003, red flags have been shown 49 times in 40 races, with the latest one being at the first race of the 2026 Snap-on IndyCar Weekend. A total of seven IndyCar Series races were not resumed, five because of weather conditions and two due to crashes involving drivers. Two races—VisionAire 500K (1999, Indy Racing League) and IZOD IndyCar World Championship (2011, IndyCar Series)—were abandoned after being red-flagged due to accidents that resulted in fatalities. The 2023 Indianapolis 500 was red-flagged three times, more than any other race in IndyCar Series history.

== Red-flagged races ==
Key
Y	Yes — Indicates the race was resumed
S	Shortened — Indicates the race was resumed but the scheduled distance was not completed
N	No — Indicates the race was not resumed

- The "Lap" column identifies the lap on which the red flag was shown.
- The "R" column indicates whether or not the race was resumed.

Indy Racing League/IndyCar Series races that have been red-flagged
#	Year	Race	Lap	R	Winner	Incident that prompted red flag	Ref.
Indy Racing League (1996–2002)
1	1996	True Value 200	124	Y	Scott Sharp	Rain.	
2	1996	Las Vegas 500K	185	Y	Richie Hearn	Crash of Johnny O'Connell.	
3	1997	Indy 200 at Walt Disney World	149	N	Eddie Cheever	Rain.	
4	1997	Indianapolis 500	15	Y (Note: The race was postponed and was completed the next day.)	Arie Luyendyk	Rain.	
5	1999	VisionAire 500K	79	N	Race abandoned (Note: The race was abandoned after the confirmation of the deaths of three spectators.)	Crash involving John Paul Jr. and Stan Wattles, resulting in the deaths of three spectators.	
6	2001	Indianapolis 500	155	Y	Hélio Castroneves	Rain.	
IndyCar Series (2003–present)
1	2003	SunTrust Indy Challenge	206	N (Note: The checkered flag was shown simultaneously with the red flag.)	Scott Dixon	Rain.	
2	2003	Chevy 500	195	N	Gil de Ferran	Crash involving Kenny Bräck and Tomas Scheckter, resulting in debris on the track.	
3	2004	Indianapolis 500	28	S (Note: The race was scheduled for 200 laps, but was shortened to 180 due to rain; the red flag, however, was not shown on lap 180.)	Buddy Rice	Rain.	
4	2005	Peak Antifreeze Indy 300	27	Y	Dan Wheldon	Crash involving Alex Barron and Ryan Briscoe, resulting in a damage barrier.	
5	2007	Indianapolis 500	112	S (Note: The race was scheduled for 200 laps, but was shortened to 166 due to rain; the red flag, however, was not shown on lap 166.)	Dario Franchitti	Rain.	
6	2008	Firestone Indy 200	170	N	Scott Dixon	Rain.	
7	2010	São Paulo Indy 300	35	S	Will Power	Rain.	
8	2011	São Paulo Indy 300	9	S	Will Power	Rain.	
9	2011	São Paulo Indy 300	14	S	Will Power	Rain.	
10	2011	MoveThatBlock.com Indy 225	220	N	Ryan Hunter-Reay	Crash involving Danica Patrick, Will Power, Takuma Sato, and rain.	
11	2011	IZOD IndyCar World Championship	12	N (Note: The race was abandoned after five tribute laps for Dan Wheldon.)	Race abandoned (Note: The race was abandoned due to the death of Dan Wheldon.)	Crashes involving 15 drivers, (Note: Crashes involved Townsend Bell, Wade Cunningham, J. R. Hildebrand, Jay Howard, James Jakes, Charlie Kimball, Alex Lloyd, Pippa Mann, Vítor Meira, Will Power, Buddy Rice, Tomas Scheckter, Paul Tracy, E. J. Viso and Dan Wheldon.) resulting in the death of Dan Wheldon.	
12	2012	Chevrolet Detroit Belle Isle Grand Prix	45	S	Scott Dixon	Crashes involving James Hinchcliffe and Takuma Sato, and a damaged track.	
13	2012	MAVTV 500 IndyCar World Championships	242	Y	Ed Carpenter	Crash of Tony Kanaan.	
14	2014	Indianapolis 500	192	Y	Ryan Hunter-Reay	Crash of Townsend Bell, resulting in a damaged barrier and debris on the track.	
15	2014	Iowa Corn Indy 300	39	Y	Ryan Hunter-Reay	Rain.	
16	2015	Chevrolet Detroit Belle Isle Grand Prix (race 1)	47	N	Carlos Muñoz	Thunderstorm.	
17	2015	Chevrolet Detroit Belle Isle Grand Prix (race 2)	65	S	Sébastien Bourdais	Crash involving Hélio Castroneves and Will Power.	
18	2015	MAVTV 500	245	Y	Graham Rahal	Crash involving Will Power and Takuma Sato.	
19	2016	Firestone 600	71	Y (Note: The race was postponed from the originally scheduled date of June 12 to August 27.)	Graham Rahal	Rain.	
20	2017	Indianapolis 500	55	Y	Takuma Sato	Crash involving Scott Dixon and Jay Howard, resulting in a damaged barrier and debris on the track.	
21	2017	Chevrolet Detroit Grand Prix (race 2)	67	Y	Graham Rahal	James Hinchcliffe and Spencer Pigot stopped on the track.	
22	2017	Rainguard Water Sealers 600	154	Y	Will Power	Crashes involving Mikhail Aleshin, Ed Carpenter, J. R. Hildebrand, James Hinchcliffe, Ryan Hunter-Reay, Ed Jones, Tony Kanaan, Carlos Muñoz and Tristan Vautier.	
23	2018	Honda Indy Grand Prix of Alabama	19	S	Josef Newgarden	Rain.	
24	2018	Honda Indy Grand Prix of Alabama	23	S	Josef Newgarden	Rain.	
25	2018	ABC Supply 500	8	Y	Alexander Rossi	Crash involving Pietro Fittipaldi, Ryan Hunter-Reay, James Hinchcliffe, Takuma Sato and Robert Wickens, resulting in a damaged barrier and severe injuries to Wickens.	
26	2019	Indianapolis 500	180	Y	Simon Pagenaud	Crashes involving Sébastien Bourdais, Charlie Kimball, Graham Rahal, Felix Rosenqvist and Zach Veach resulting in debris on the track.	
27	2019	ABC Supply 500	3	S	Will Power	Crash involving James Hinchcliffe, Ryan Hunter-Reay, Felix Rosenqvist, Alexander Rossi and Takuma Sato, resulting in a damaged barrier.	
28	2019	ABC Supply 500	128	N	Will Power	Thunderstorm.	
29	2021	Chevrolet Detroit Grand Prix (race 1)	27	Y	Marcus Ericsson	Crash of Felix Rosenqvist, resulting in a damaged barrier.	
30	2021	Chevrolet Detroit Grand Prix (race 1)	65	Y	Marcus Ericsson	Crash of Romain Grosjean.	
31	2021	Big Machine Music City Grand Prix	20	Y	Marcus Ericsson	Crashes involving Santino Ferrucci, Jimmie Johnson, Simon Pagenaud, Álex Palou, Will Power, Takuma Sato, Rinus VeeKay and Cody Ware, resulting in a blocked track.	
32	2021	Big Machine Music City Grand Prix	76	Y	Marcus Ericsson	Crash of Colton Herta, resulting in a damaged barrier.	
33	2022	Indianapolis 500	196	Y	Marcus Ericsson	Crash of Jimmie Johnson.	
34	2022	Big Machine Music City Grand Prix	77	Y	Scott Dixon	Crash of Romain Grosjean.	
35	2022	Bommarito Automotive Group 500	217	Y	Josef Newgarden	Thunderstorm.	
36	2023	Firestone Grand Prix of St. Petersburg	1	Y	Marcus Ericsson	Crashes involving Hélio Castroneves Devlin DeFrancesco, Simon Pagenaud and Benjamin Pedersen.	
37	2023	Indianapolis 500	186	Y	Josef Newgarden	Crash involving Felix Rosenqvist and Kyle Kirkwood.	
38	2023	Indianapolis 500	194	Y	Josef Newgarden	Crashes involving Agustín Canapino, Scott McLaughlin, Pato O'Ward and Simon Pagenaud.	
39	2023	Indianapolis 500	198	Y	Josef Newgarden	Crashes involving Marco Andretti, Ed Carpenter, Christian Lundgaard, Benjamin Pedersen and Graham Rahal.	
40	2023	Big Machine Music City Grand Prix	75	Y	Kyle Kirkwood	Crash involving Agustín Canapino, Benjamin Pedersen and Felix Rosenqvist.	
41	2024	Honda Indy Toronto	73	Y	Colton Herta	Crash involving Marcus Ericsson, Santino Ferrucci, Pietro Fittipaldi, Pato O'Ward, Nolan Siegel and Toby Sowery.	
42	2024	Bommarito Automotive Group 500	252	Y	Josef Newgarden	Crashes involving Romain Grosjean, Jack Harvey, Will Power and Alexander Rossi.	
43	2025	Chevrolet Detroit Grand Prix	87	Y	Kyle Kirkwood	Crash involving Louis Foster and Felix Rosenqvist, resulting in a damaged barrier.	
44	2025	Sukup IndyCar Race Weekend (race 1)	258	Y	Pato O'Ward	Crash of Nolan Siegel, resulting in a damaged barrier.	
45	2026	Indianapolis 500	105	Y	Felix Rosenqvist	Rain.	
46	2026	Indianapolis 500	193	Y	Felix Rosenqvist	Crash of Caio Collet, resulting in a damaged barrier and debris on the track.	
47	2026	Bommarito Automotive Group 500	137	Y	Josef Newgarden	Rain.	
48	2026	Bommarito Automotive Group 500	200	Y	Josef Newgarden	Rain.	
49	2026	Snap-on IndyCar Weekend (race 1)	90	Y	Pato O'Ward	Rain.	

== Statistics ==
=== By year ===
Year	Total red flags	Year	Red-flagged races
1996	2	1996	2
1997	2	1997	2
1998	0	1998	0
1999	1	1999	1
2000	0	2000	0
2001	1	2001	1
2002	0	2002	0
2003	2	2003	2
2004	1	2004	1
2005	1	2005	1
2006	0	2006	0
2007	1	2007	1
2008	1	2008	1
2009	0	2009	0
2010	1	2010	1
2011	4	2011	3*
2012	2	2012	2
2013	0	2013	0
2014	2	2014	2
2015	3	2015	3*
2016	1	2016	1
2017	3	2017	3*
2018	3	2018	2
2019	3	2019	2
2020	0	2020	0
2021	4	2021	2
2022	3	2022	3*
2023	5*	2023	3*
2024	2	2024	2
2025	2	2025	2
2026	5*	2026	3*

=== By decade ===
Decade	1990s	2000s	2010s	2020s
Total red flags	5	7	22*	21
Red-flagged races	5	7	19*	15
