= Dale Coyne Racing =

IndyCar Series team

(United States) Dale Coyne Racing
- Owner(s): Dale Coyne
- Principal(s): Dale Coyne
- Base: Plainfield, Illinois
- Series: IndyCar Series
- Race drivers: 18. TBA; 19. (United States) Nikita Johnson
- Manufacturer: Honda

Career
- Debut: 1984
- Races competed: 836
- Drivers' Championships: 0
- Indy 500 victories: 0
- Race victories: 6
- Pole positions: 2

Dale Coyne Racing with Vasser Sullivan logo

Dale Coyne Racing (DCR) is an American professional open-wheel racing team that currently competes in the IndyCar Series and Indy NXT. The team was founded in 1984 and is owned by former driver Dale Coyne. From 1995 to 2000, the team was known as Payton-Coyne Racing, reflecting a partnership with Chicago Bears great Walter Payton. After the 1988 season, Coyne stepped out of the cockpit and turned his talents to the tutelage of several up-and-coming drivers. Once known for competing on budgets far smaller than most of their competitors, the team earned its maiden victory after 25 years at Watkins Glen International in July 2009 with Justin Wilson.

Dale Coyne Racing is also the second oldest and longest-stay tenured partnership with Honda engine since 2008 in IndyCar Series due to other IndyCar teams switched engine partners in the past.

== CART / Champ Car World Series ==
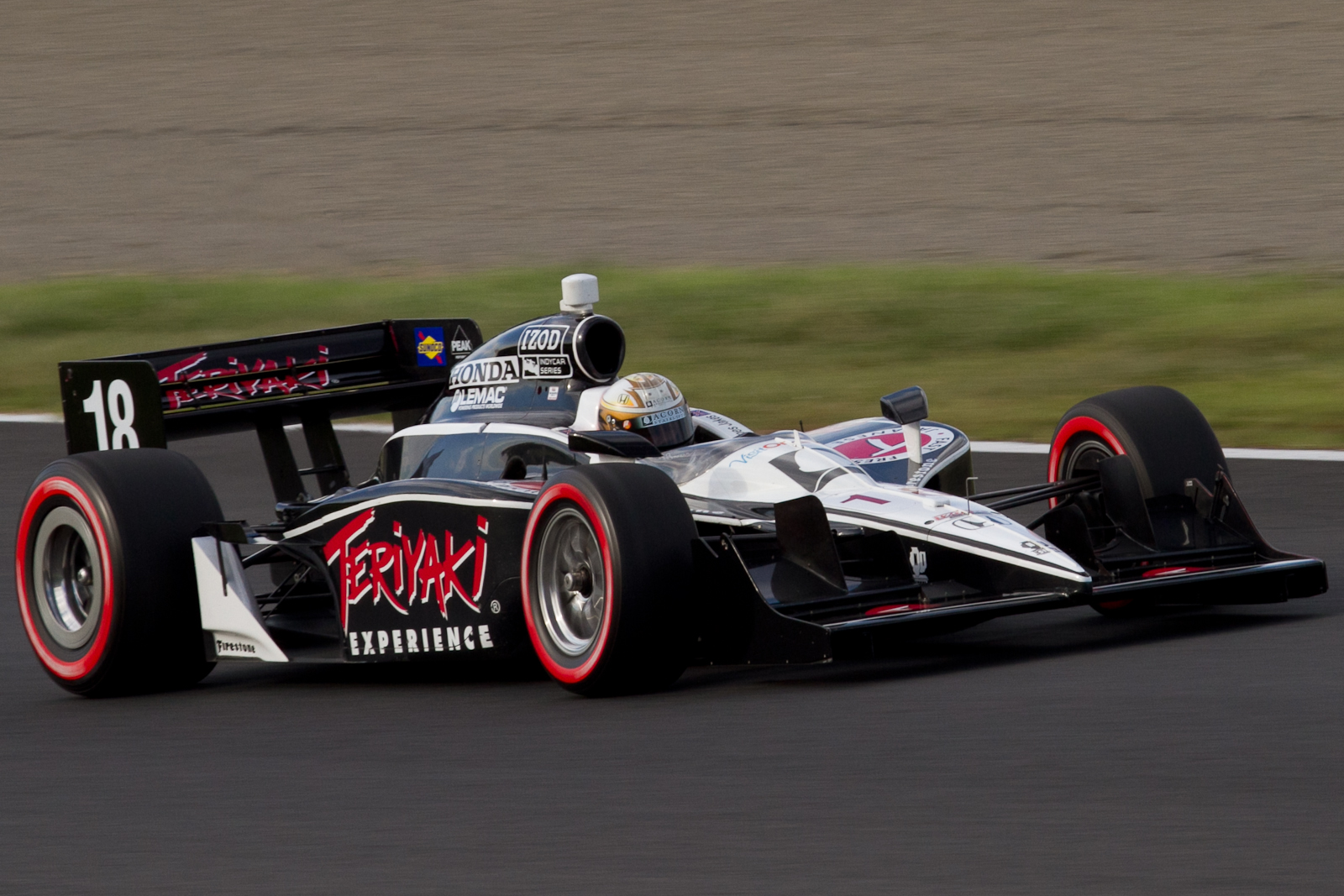
James Jakes at the 2011 Indy Japan: The Final.

Dale Coyne raced smaller open-cockpit cars during the late-1970s and early-1980s before pursuing a career in the fledgling CART series. He attempted to qualify, with limited success, for each CART race in 1984, but his efforts earned him a CART franchise for the following season. In 1986, the team raced the Coyne DC-1, which was a 1984 Lola Indy car modified to fit a Chevrolet stock-block engine. The team reverted to a customer March chassis for the next season, with Coyne doing all of the driving. Due to budget constraints, the team utilized one of the only stock-block Chevrolet engines in the field. After utilizing the 1986 Rookie of the Year Dominic Dobson for one race in 1988 with little improvement in performance, Coyne realized that the team could not improve without better equipment. In 1989, the team upgraded to a pair of 1988 Lola-Cosworth cars for Italian pay drivers Guido Dacco and Fulvio Ballabio.

The end of 1988 saw Coyne's retirement as a driver to concentrate on tutoring newer, younger drivers, although he contested several more races as a driver through 1991. In 1990, the team fielded a new Lola car for Dean Hall, thanks to full-time sponsorship from the Japanese [insight] group. The chief mechanic, Bernie Myers, ensured a well-prepared car that earned the team its first start at the Indy 500 and scored 4 points during the season. The team's mechanical expertise was recognized as both Coyne and Myers would be awarded the Clint Brawner Mechanical Excellence Award at the 1990 and 1992 Indy 500 races, respectively.

For much of the team's subsequent years, it has utilized pay drivers, who finance their racing with Coyne with either personal funds or self-obtained sponsorship. Often, the team ran one driver for a full season, with a second car being prepared for a rotation of drivers with only a partial season of financing. However, Coyne earned a reputation for quickly developing the skills of these drivers to a point where they could advance their careers. Drivers of note who had their first CART ride with Coyne included eventual series champion Paul Tracy, the Indy Lights champion Éric Bachelart, and eventual Le Mans winner André Lotterer.

Despite the lack of competitive results during its first two decades of operation, the team was nevertheless a consistent full-time entrant year after year. Ex-Formula 1 driver Roberto Moreno, starting his second stint in CART racing in 1996, broke through with the team's first podium finish at the 1996 U.S. 500.

Michel Jourdain Jr. took over driving duties for the team and earned STP Most Improved Driver honors from his peers, in 1997. Jourdain would continue with the team through the 1999 season. Meanwhile, the second car was provided to various drivers with few competitive results.

In 2000, Tarso Marques led the team with 17 starts following a deal with Swift Engineering for the team to field a factory-supported Swift chassis. He was joined by Takuya Kurosawa, who drove 8 starts, including an inspired drive at Long Beach which saw Kurosawa becoming the first Japanese driver to lead a CART race before an accident ended his hopes of a Top 10 finish. Alex Barron and Gualter Salles also shared the second car. Marques and Barron both recorded career-best finishes when the season closed. Barron, in particular, ran as high as second place in Australia before suffering an engine failure, and was in contention at Fontana, where he led the race for several laps and was in contention for victory before again retiring with an engine failure.

The team struggled to stay afloat in 2001, following a short-lived partnership with the Project Racing Group that only enabled the team to contest two races. Coyne reemerged the following year to field the one-off Team St. George entry with driver Darren Manning, which resulted in a competitive run to 9th place at the 2002 Rockingham 500. Later in the season, Coyne provided Andre Lotterer with his only Champ Car start in Mexico.

The Coyne team returned to full-time competition in 2003, fielding six drivers with a top result of 6th place by the veteran Salles, although the other drivers were seldom competitive.

The 2004 Champ Car season was an improved season with new sponsors American Medical Response and Yoke TV. The 19 & 11 entries were piloted by Oriol Servià and Gastón Mazzacane. Servià had Dale Coyne Racing's best season ever by placing third at Mazda Raceway Laguna Seca and finishing 10th in the final standings.

In 2007, driver Bruno Junqueira recorded back-to-back-to-back podium finishes – Zolder, Belgium, Assen, Netherlands and Surfers Paradise, Australia –en route to a seventh-place finish for the year.

== IndyCar Series ==
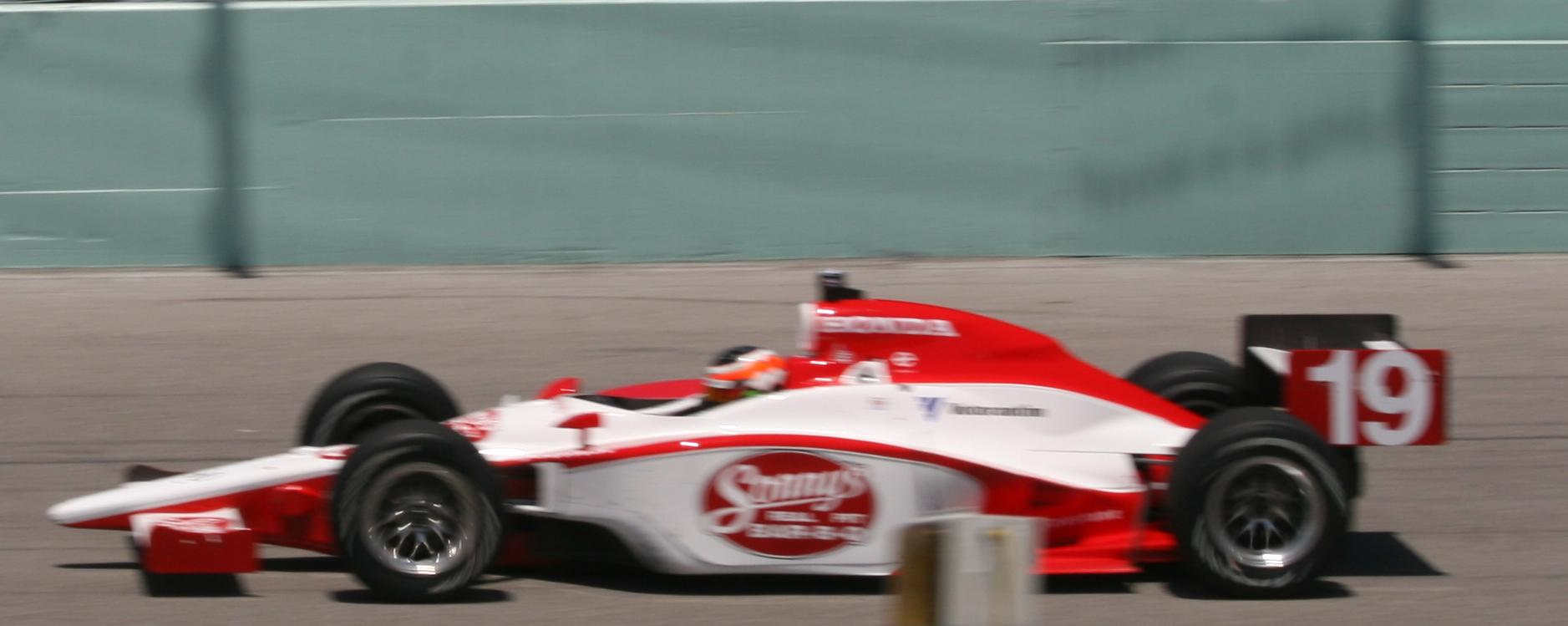
Mario Moraes practicing for the 2008 GAINSCO Indy 300 at the Homestead-Miami Speedway.

In 2008, the team's first year in the IndyCar Series, drivers Bruno Junqueira and Mario Moraes recorded five combined top-10 finishes and both drivers led several laps during the famed Indianapolis 500.

In the first race of the 2009 season, the Honda Grand Prix of St. Petersburg, driver Justin Wilson finished third, which was the first IRL podium finish for Dale Coyne Racing. On July 5, 2009, Wilson earned Dale Coyne Racing their first win by winning the Camping World Grand Prix at the Glen, at Watkins Glen International. The British driver dominated the race, leading 49 of the 60 laps. It was Coyne's 558th career start as an owner or as a driver.

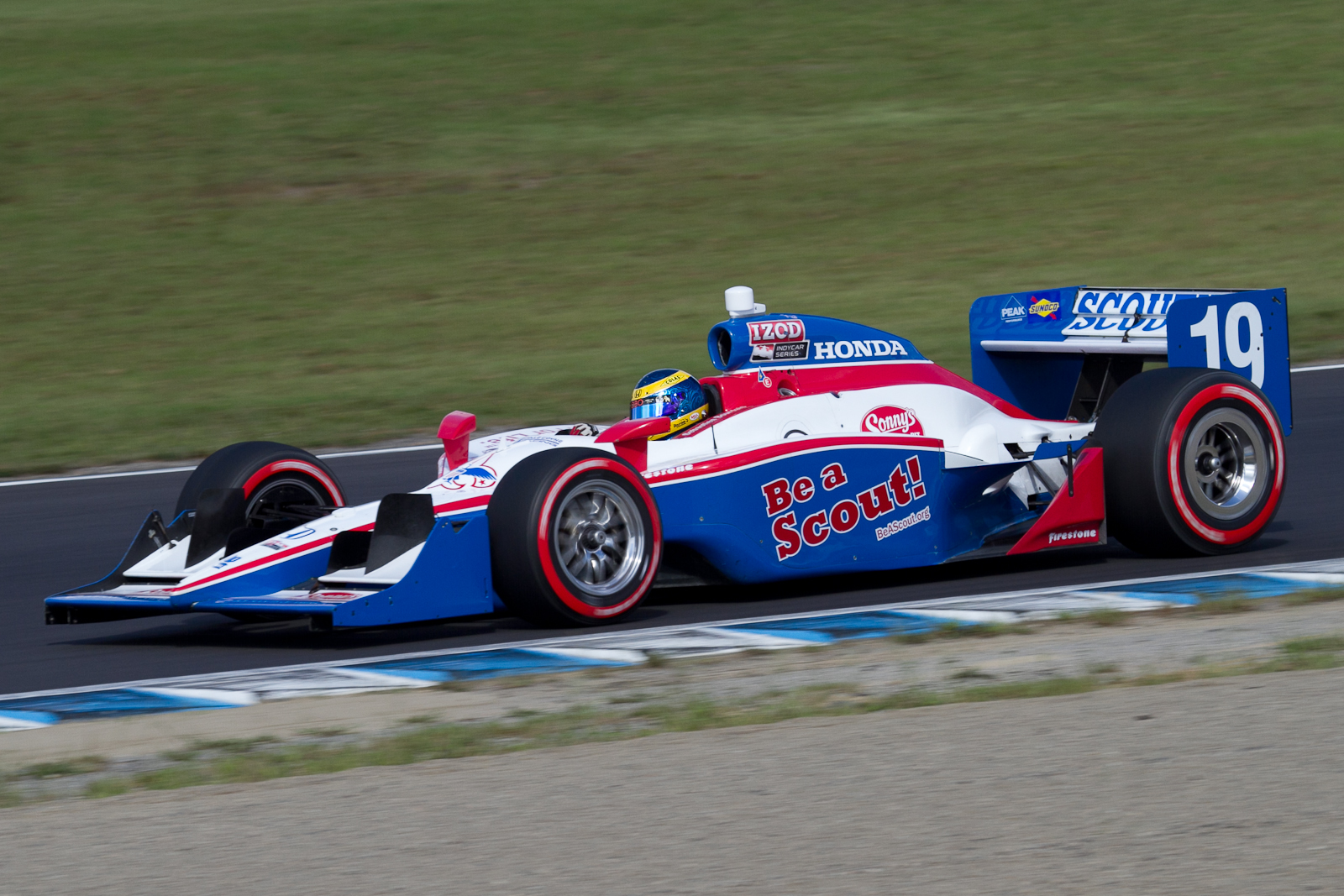
Sebastien Bourdais at the 2011 Indy Japan: The Final.

On January 11 the team announced that Boy Scouts of America would be the primary sponsor of the number 19 car for 2010. He also stated that Z Line will likely return to sponsor the number 18 car and that drivers would be announced at a later date. However, on February 4, it was announced that Z Line would follow Justin Wilson to Dreyer & Reinbold Racing. On March 4, DCR announced Milka Duno would drive the number 18 Citgo car for the entire season. Duno's season brought her the best finish of 19th, though she failed to qualify for the Indy 500 and ended up 23rd in points while British driver Alex Lloyd in the #19 car won Rookie of the Year, finishing 16th in points with a best finish of fourth in the 2010 Indianapolis 500. Duno moved over to ARCA following the season. British rookie James Jakes stepped into the #18 car for 2011 and four-time Champ Car champion Sébastien Bourdais was signed to drive the #19 respectively for road course races only due to conflicts with the Le Mans Series, where he also competed. Alex Lloyd was returned to the team to drive in the oval races. Lloyd qualified for the 2011 Indianapolis 500 and finished 19th but Jakes failed to make the field.

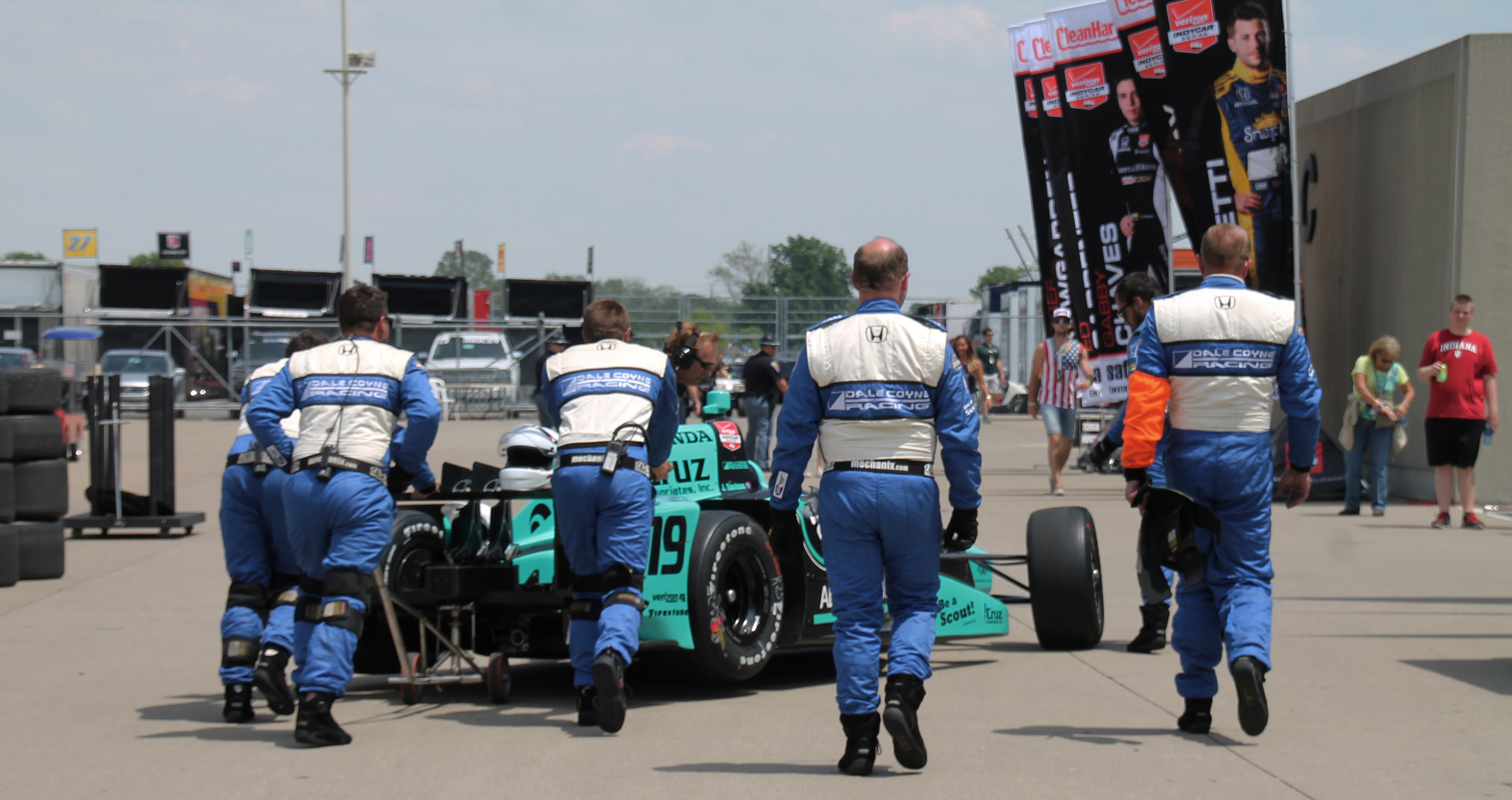
James Davison's car goes back to the garage at the 2015 Indianapolis 500.

On January 25, 2012, Honda and its Honda Performance Development (HPD) announced it would power a two-car effort for Dale Coyne Racing in the 2012 IZOD IndyCar Series with their all-new 2.2-liter turbocharged V6 IndyCar engine. Justin Wilson also returned to the team for the 2012 season. In addition to the signing of both Honda and Wilson, the team has also re-signed renowned engineer Bill Pappas, "putting the band back together" of the team that combined to score Dale Coyne Racing's first win in IndyCar racing, at Watkins Glen in 2009.

The team scored its second win and first-ever oval win with Justin Wilson at Texas Motor Speedway in 2012 and captured another win in 2013 with Mike Conway in his first start for the team in Detroit Belle Isle Grand Prix race 1. In that race Justin Wilson finished third, putting two Coyne cars on the podium for the first time. Ana Beatriz had driven Conway's car for the first five races of the season.

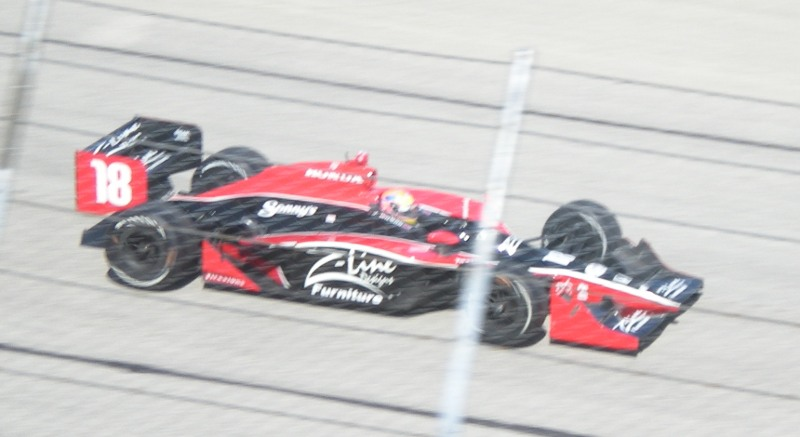
Justin Wilson at the 2009 ABC Supply Company A.J. Foyt 225.

For 2014, Wilson would remain in the No. 19 while Formula Renault 3.5 driver Carlos Huertas would take over the No. 18 for the season. Huertas would score his first career win at the first round of the Grand Prix of Houston.

In 2015, Carlos Huertas made his return to the No. 18 car and rookie Francesco Dracone drove the No. 19 in the first few races of the season. In May 2015, it was announced that Huertas had an ear problem and could not continue racing for the season. It was also announced that Dracone was released from the team. Pippa Mann then drove the rest of the oval races for the season in the No. 18 car and Rodolfo González drove the rest of the road courses for the remainder of the season in that car. After Francesco Dracone's release from the No. 19, James Davison drove the car in the Indianapolis 500 and 2013 rookie Tristan Vautier drove the No. 19 for the remainder of the season.

In 2016, rookie Conor Daly drove the No. 18 car sponsored by Johnathon Byrd's Group for the entirety of the 2016 season. He finished the year 18th in the standings. The No. 19 entry had three drivers that shared seat time, which included Luca Filippi, RC Enerson, Pippa Mann, and Gabby Chaves. Gabby Chaves drove for the team in the 100th Indianapolis 500 while RC Enerson had two very impressive appearances at Mid-Ohio and Watkins Glen.

For 2017, it was announced that Sébastien Bourdais would drive the No. 18 car, to be joined by engineers Craig Hampson, who he won his 4 Champ Car titles with at Newman-Haas Racing and Olivier Boisson, who he won races with at KVSH Racing. In addition, 2016 Indy Lights champion Ed Jones would drive the No. 19 car. The team had early success to start the season with Bourdais winning at St. Petersburg and finishing second at Long Beach and holding an early season points lead, while Jones was 7th in points after two races after back-to-back top-ten finishes. After a moderately successful race at Barber Motorsports Park, however, Bourdais' fortunes began to turn sour, as early retirements plagued the No. 18 both at Phoenix and the Indianapolis road course. Bourdais' season then came to a sudden end during qualifying for the Indy 500, where a severe accident left him with multiple pelvic fractures and a fractured hip. James Davison was hired as a last-minute replacement for the 500. Ex-F1 driver Esteban Gutiérrez was then signed to drive the car until Bourdais' return (at Gateway after a rapid recovery), except for the Texas round where Tristan Vautier returned to the team. Jones would go on to win Rookie of the Year honors on the strength of his 3rd place finish at the Indy 500 but would depart for Chip Ganassi Racing at the end of the year.

In February 2018, former KVSH co-owners Jimmy Vasser and James "Sulli" Sullivan formed a partnership with Dale Coyne to field Sébastien Bourdais for the 2018 IndyCar Series as Dale Coyne Racing with Vasser-Sullivan. Replacing Jones in the No. 19 would be Indy Lights driver Zachary Claman DeMelo and 2017 Formula V8 3.5 champion Pietro Fittipaldi, grandson of Emerson Fittipaldi. However, Fittipaldi would be injured during qualifying for the World Endurance Championship 6 Hours of Spa-Francorchamps, requiring De Melo to replace him for May and Texas, while Haas F1 Team development driver Santino Ferrucci would debut at the Detroit Grand Prix (IndyCar) and finished 22nd and 20th. Fittipaldi returned at Mid Ohio in the No. 19 car due to be joined by Ferrucci for the final two races of the season in a third car sponsored by Cly-Del running the number 39.

Sebastien Bourdais continued driving in the No. 18 car with a continuation of the Vasser-Sullivan partnership which had also been extended for multiple years. Bourdais' best finish was a podium achieved at Barber Motorsports Park. Santino Ferrucci would return to the team for the full season in 2019 running as the only driver in a David Yurman sponsored No. 19 car. His best finish of the season came at the opening race of 9th with another Top 10 at the IndyCar Grand Prix. James Davison will join the team for the 2019 Indianapolis 500 in a partnership with Jonathan Byrd's Racing, Hollinger MotorSport, and Belardi Auto Racing in a continuation of the partnership from last year but changing from A.J. Foyt Racing continuing to use the No. 33.

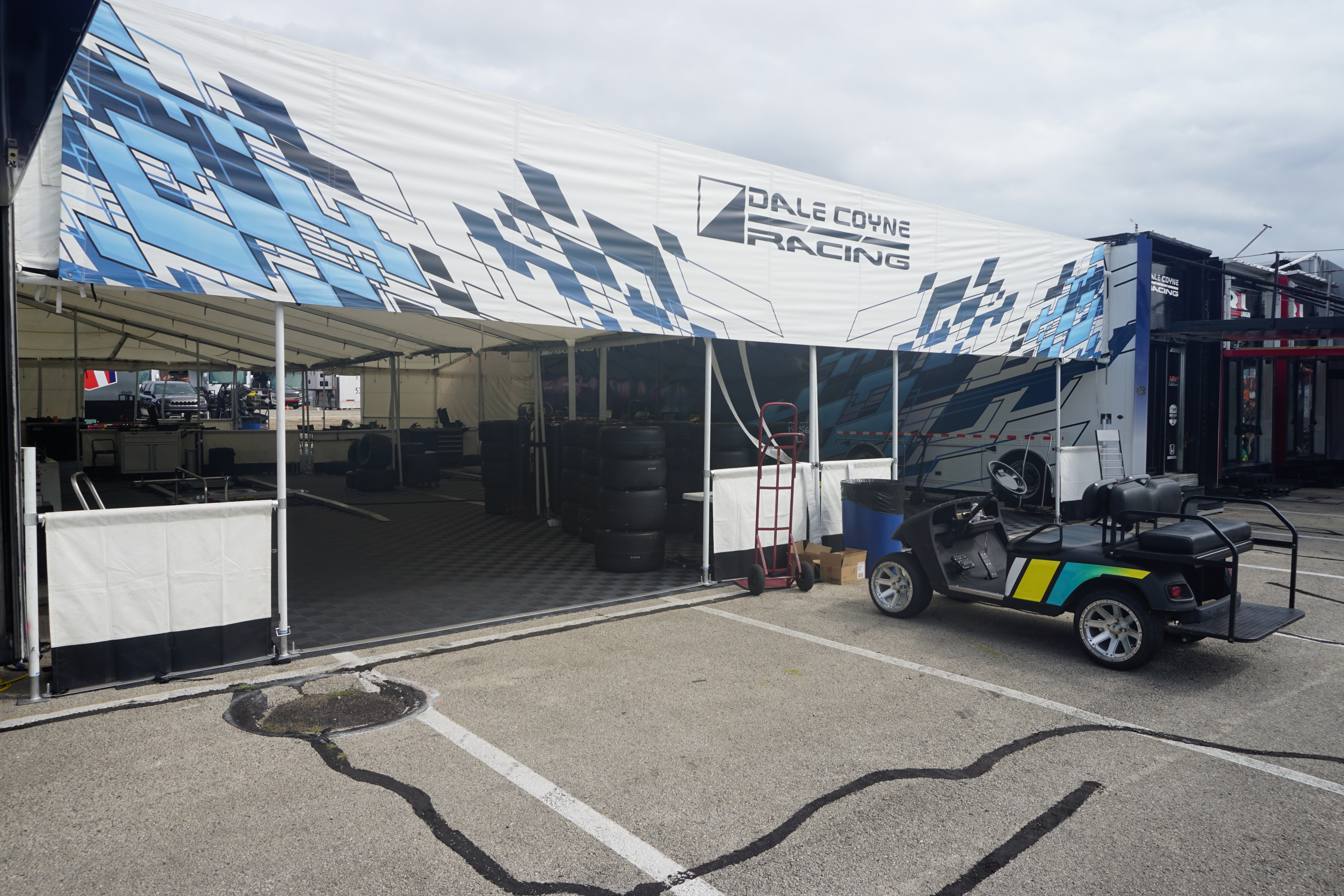
Dale Coyne Racing garage at the 2024 Hy-Vee Milwaukee Mile 250s

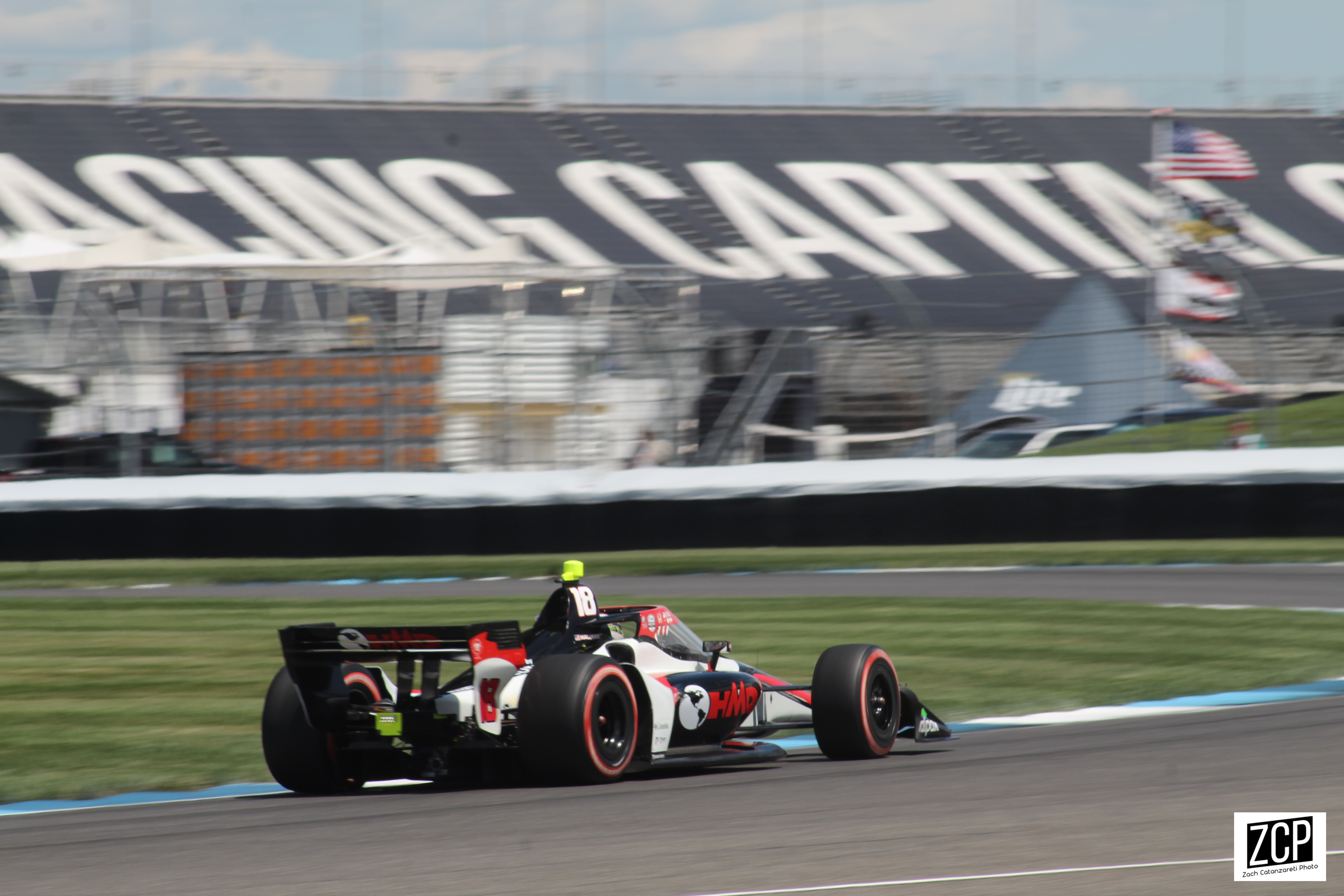
David Malukas driving for Dale Coyne Racing at the Indianapolis Motor Speedway in 2022.

In December 2021, the team announced they would be signing Takuma Sato to race full-time for the 2022 season in the No. 51 car, replacing the outgoing Romain Grosjean. Also, they would partner with HMD Motorsports in the #18 for David Malukas. Malukas returned to the team for 2023, while Sting Ray Robb made his IndyCar debut in the No. 51 car for the season.

In May 2026, the team announced that they would decorate Romain Grosjean's No. 18 car for the 2026 Indianapolis 500 with the same number font the late Kyle Busch used throughout his NASCAR career.

== Chicagoland Speedway ==
In 1998, Coyne designed and built Route 66 Raceway in Joliet, Illinois. This state-of-the-art drag racing facility drew the attention of Indianapolis Motor Speedway CEO Tony George. George and Coyne, along with International Speedway Corporation, would go on to expand the facility by forming a partnership and building Chicagoland Speedway. Coyne served as president of the facility through its construction and opening season and along with George, served on its management committee until its eventual buyout by ISC in 2007.

== Racing results ==
=== Complete CART / CCWS results ===
(key)

Year	Chassis	Engine	Tyres	Drivers	No.	1	2	3	4	5	6	7	8	9	10	11	12	13	14	15	16	17	18	19	20	Pts Pos	Pos
1984						LBH	PHX	INDY	MIL	POR	MEA	CLE	MCH	ROA	POC	MDO	SAN	MCH	PHX	LAG	CPL						
1984	Eagle 81	Chevrolet V8	G	(United States) Jim McElreath	45		DNQ																			NC	—
1984	Eagle 81	Chevrolet V8	G	(United States) Tom Bigelow	45				DNQ																	NC	—
1984	Eagle 81	Chevrolet V8	G	(United States) Dale Coyne	45					DNQ	DNQ	DNQ	DNQ	DNQ		14			DNQ	DNQ						40th	0
1985						LBH	INDY	MIL	POR	MEA	CLE	MCH	ROA	POC	MDO	SAN	MCH	LAG	PHX	MIA							
1985	Lola T900	Chevrolet V8	G	(United States) Dale Coyne	19	DNQ		DNS	DNQ	DNQ	DNS	24	23	27	28		DNS	27	DNQ	DNQ						52nd	0
1986						PHX	LBH	INDY	MIL	POR	MEA	CLE	TOR	MCH	POC	MDO	SAN	MCH	ROA	LAG	PHX	MIA					
1986	DC-1	Chevrolet V8	G	(United States) Dale Coyne	19	DNQ	23			21	DNQ	12	DNQ	DNQ	26	23	12	DNQ	17	DNS	DNQ	25				34th	2
1987						LBH	PHX	INDY	MIL	POR	MEA	CLE	TOR	MCH	POC	ROA	MDO	NAZ	LAG	MIA							
1987	March 86C	Chevrolet V8	G	(United States) Dale Coyne	19	DNS	DNQ		DNQ	17	15	25	18	DNS	24	17	20	DNQ	21	DNQ						40th	0
1988						LBH	PHX	INDY	MIL	POR	MEA	CLE	TOR	MCH	POC	ROA	MDO	NAZ	LAG	MIA							
1988	March 86C	Chevrolet V8	G	(United States) Dominic Dobson	19		26																			41st	0
1988	March 86C	Chevrolet V8	G	(United States) Dale Coyne	19	DNS			13	24	25	16	22	27	DNQ	24	DNS	DNQ	27	12						34th	1
1988	March 86C	Chevrolet V8	G	(United States) Dale Coyne	39			DNQ																		34th	1
1989						PHX	LBH	INDY	MIL	DET	POR	CLE	MEA	TOR	MCH	POC	MDO	ROA	NAZ	LAG							
1989	Lola T88/00	Cosworth DFX V8t	G	(Italy) Guido Daccò (R)	19	24	22	DNQ	14	12	12	21	DNQ													29th	3
1989	Lola T88/00	Cosworth DFX V8t	G	(United States) John Paul Jr.	19										DNQ											44th	0
1989	Lola T88/00	Cosworth DFX V8t	G	(United States) John Paul Jr.	39			DNQ																		44th	0
1989	Lola T88/00	Cosworth DFX V8t	G	(United States) Dale Coyne	39			DNQ																		51st	0
1989	Lola T88/00	Cosworth DFX V8t	G	(United States) Dale Coyne	19											27										51st	0
1989	Lola T88/00	Cosworth DFX V8t	G	(Italy) Fulvio Ballabio	19												18	DNQ								46th	0
1989	Lola T88/00	Cosworth DFX V8t	G	(United States) Ken Johnson	19															27						52nd	0
1990						PHX	LBH	INDY	MIL	DET	POR	CLE	MEA	TOR	MCH	DEN	VAN	MDO	ROA	NAZ	LAG						
1990	Lola T88/00; Lola T90/00	Cosworth DFX V8t; Cosworth DFS V8t	G	(United States) Dean Hall (R)	19	15	18		16	23	14	11	19	19	23	23	15	11	15		21					25th	4
1990	Lola T88/00; Lola T90/00	Cosworth DFX V8t; Cosworth DFS V8t	G	(United States) Dean Hall (R)	39			17																		25th	4
1991						SFR	LBH	PHX	INDY	MIL	DET	POR	CLE	MEA	TOR	MCH	DEN	VAN	MDO	ROA	NAZ	LAG					
1991	Lola T88/00; Lola T90/00	Cosworth DFX V8t; Cosworth DFS V8t	G	(United States) Randy Lewis	39				14																	29th	1
1991	Lola T88/00; Lola T90/00	Cosworth DFX V8t; Cosworth DFS V8t	G	(United States) Randy Lewis	19	13	15	19						14	12	16	17		15	22		26				29th	1
1991	Lola T88/00; Lola T90/00	Cosworth DFX V8t; Cosworth DFS V8t	G	(United States) Dale Coyne	19					21	DNQ	23														45th	0
1991	Lola T88/00; Lola T90/00	Cosworth DFX V8t; Cosworth DFS V8t	G	(Canada) Ross Bentley (R)	19													13								33rd	0
1991	Lola T88/00; Lola T90/00	Cosworth DFX V8t; Cosworth DFS V8t	G	(United States) Buddy Lazier	19								11													22nd	6
1991	Lola T88/00; Lola T90/00	Cosworth DFX V8t; Cosworth DFS V8t	G	(United States) Buddy Lazier	90	25					18									24						22nd	6
1991	Lola T88/00; Lola T90/00	Cosworth DFX V8t; Cosworth DFS V8t	G	(United States) Buddy Lazier	39										22		9					22				22nd	6
1991	Lola T88/00; Lola T90/00	Cosworth DFX V8t; Cosworth DFS V8t	G	(Canada) Paul Tracy (R)	39		22		Wth																	21st	6
1991	Lola T88/00; Lola T90/00	Cosworth DFX V8t; Cosworth DFS V8t	G	(United States) Jeff Wood	39			22																		31st	0
1991	Lola T88/00; Lola T90/00	Cosworth DFX V8t; Cosworth DFS V8t	G	(United States) Michael Greenfield	39				DNQ										16	20						39th	0
1991	Lola T88/00; Lola T90/00	Cosworth DFX V8t; Cosworth DFS V8t	G	(United States) Dennis Vitolo	39	24	26				20										14					36th	0
1992						SFR	PHX	LBH	INDY	DET	POR	MIL	NHA	TOR	MCH	CLE	ROA	VAN	MDO	NAZ	LAG						
1992	Lola T90/00; Lola T91/00	Cosworth DFS V8t; Buick 3300 V6t	G	(Belgium) Éric Bachelart (R)	39																23					18th	11
1992	Lola T90/00; Lola T91/00	Cosworth DFS V8t; Buick 3300 V6t	G	(Belgium) Éric Bachelart (R)	19	22	13	8	32	7	16	13		24	22	17	21	DNS	20	DNQ						18th	11
1992	Lola T90/00; Lola T91/00	Cosworth DFS V8t; Buick 3300 V6t	G	(United States) Dennis Vitolo	19								14							20	17					42nd	0
1992	Lola T90/00; Lola T91/00	Cosworth DFS V8t; Buick 3300 V6t	G	(United States) Dennis Vitolo	39		21																			42nd	0
1992	Lola T90/00; Lola T91/00	Cosworth DFS V8t; Buick 3300 V6t	G	(Canada) Ross Bentley	39	11				20	17			14	23	18	DNQ	14								30th	2
1992	Lola T90/00; Lola T91/00	Cosworth DFS V8t; Buick 3300 V6t	G	(United States) Brian Bonner (R)	39				19			DNQ	DNQ						17							28th	3
1993						SFR	PHX	LBH	INDY	MIL	DET	POR	CLE	TOR	MCH	NHA	ROA	VAN	MDO	NAZ	LAG						
1993	Lola T92/00	Chevrolet 265A V8t; Buick 3300 V6t	G	(United States) Robbie Buhl (R)	19	23	19	6	DNQ	17	28		24				19		14	17	16					21st	8
1993	Lola T92/00	Chevrolet 265A V8t; Buick 3300 V6t	G	(United States) Johnny Unser (R)	19							18		17		18		21								44th	0
1993	Lola T92/00	Chevrolet 265A V8t; Buick 3300 V6t	G	(Belgium) Éric Bachelart	32				DNQ																	NC	—
1993	Lola T92/00	Chevrolet 265A V8t; Buick 3300 V6t	G	(Canada) Ross Bentley	39	17	12	15	DNQ	14	DNQ	15	16	25	16		17	17	DNQ	22	DNQ					32nd	1
1994						SFR	PHX	LBH	INDY	MIL	DET	POR	CLE	TOR	MCH	MDO	NHA	VAN	ROA	NAZ	LAG						
1994	Lola T93/00	Ford XB V8t	G	(United States) Robbie Buhl	19	20		16																		41st	0
1994	Lola T93/00	Ford XB V8t	G	(United States) Brian Till	19		19		12																	33rd	1
1994	Lola T93/00	Ford XB V8t	G	(Italy) Alessandro Zampedri (R)	19						26	7	10	17	Wth			28	23	20	16					25th	9
1994	Lola T93/00	Ford XB V8t	G	(Italy) Mauro Baldi (R)	19											19										47th	0
1994	Lola T93/00	Ford XB V8t	G	(United States) Johnny Unser	19					DNQ							15									40th	0
1994	Lola T92/00	Ilmor 265A V8t	G	(United States) Johnny Unser	39		DNQ	DNQ																		40th	0
1994	Lola T92/00	Ilmor 265A V8t	G	(Italy) Andrea Montermini	39	Wth																				24th	10
1994	Lola T92/00	Ilmor 265A V8t	G	(Canada) Ross Bentley	39				DNQ	DNQ	DNQ	22	29	19	19	DNQ	22	DNQ	DNS	DNQ	DNQ					46th	0
1995						MIA	SFR	PHX	LBH	NAZ	INDY	MIL	DET	POR	ROA	TOR	CLE	MCH	MDO	NHA	VAN	LAG					
1995	Lola T94/00	Ford XB V8t	F	(Belgium) Éric Bachelart	19	19	22	18	7		28		23	19	11	22	21		16							23rd	8
1995	Lola T94/00	Ford XB V8t	F	(United States) Buddy Lazier	19					25		18						14		21						35th	0
1995	Lola T94/00	Ford XB V8t	F	(Canada) Ross Bentley	19																DNQ					NC	—
1995	Lola T94/00	Ford XB V8t	F	(France) Franck Fréon	19																	DNQ				36th	0
1995	Lola T94/00	Ford XB V8t	F	(Italy) Alessandro Zampedri	34	23	19	19	8	15	11	22	26	16	20	23	9	13	14	14	9	20				22nd	15
1996						MIA	RIO	SFR	LBH	NAZ	500	MIL	DET	POR	CLE	TOR	MCH	MDO	ROA	VAN	LAG						
1996	Lola T96/00	Ford XB V8t	F	(Japan) Hiro Matsushita	19	18	24	10	28	26	14	28	19	21	17	27	15	19	15	15	23					28th	3
1996	Lola T96/00	Ford XB V8t	F	(Brazil) Roberto Moreno	34	27	9	12	8	24	3	25	23	19	14	23	23	23	22	27	12					21st	25
1997						MIA	SFR	LBH	NAZ	RIO	GAT	MIL	DET	POR	CLE	TOR	MCH	MDO	ROA	VAN	LAG	FON					
1997	Lola T97/00; Reynard 97i	Ford XD V8t	F	(Mexico) Michel Jourdain Jr.	19	18	18	17	20	17	16	27	22	12	18	13	13	18	20	21	22	18				29th	1
1997	Lola T97/00; Reynard 97i	Ford XD V8t	F	(Brazil) Roberto Moreno	34	24																				19th	16
1997	Lola T97/00; Reynard 97i	Ford XD V8t	F	(United States) Paul Jasper (R)	34		23	19	DNS	24	DNS	18														33rd	0
1997	Lola T97/00; Reynard 97i	Ford XD V8t	F	(Germany) Christian Danner	34								12	27						23						31st	1
1997	Lola T97/00; Reynard 97i	Ford XD V8t	F	(United States) Charlie Nearburg (R)	34										26			DNS	17		18					32nd	0
1997	Lola T97/00; Reynard 97i	Ford XD V8t	F	(United States) Dennis Vitolo	34											28	7					16				25th	6
1998						MIA	MOT	LBH	NAZ	RIO	GAT	MIL	DET	POR	CLE	TOR	MCH	MDO	ROA	VAN	LAG	HOU	SFR	FON			
1998	Reynard 98i	Ford XD V8t	F	(Mexico) Michel Jourdain Jr.	19	28	22	27	12	24	17	15	13	19	26	18	18	28	14	10	24	25	26	12		24th	5
1998	Reynard 98i	Ford XD V8t	F	(United States) Dennis Vitolo	34	25			25		25	DNS	28	18	24		26			17	26	19	DNS	25		33rd	0
1998	Reynard 98i	Ford XD V8t	F	(Brazil) Gualter Salles	34		12	13		20						21		23	17							28th	1
1999						MIA	MOT	LBH	NAZ	RIO	GAT	MIL	POR	CLE	ROA	TOR	MCH	DET	MDO	CHI	VAN	LAG	HOU	SRF	FON		
1999	Lola B99/00	Ford XD V8t	F	(Mexico) Michel Jourdain Jr.	19	18	18	18	16	16	20	16	20	27	7	21	21	21	26	18	17	20	18	12	13	25th	7
1999	Reynard 99i	Ford XD V8t	F	(Brazil) Gualter Salles	34			27																		26th	5
1999	Reynard 99i	Ford XD V8t	F	(United States) Dennis Vitolo	34	16			Wth		24	22					11			15					15	30th	2
1999	Reynard 99i	Ford XD V8t	F	(United States) Dennis Vitolo	71											18										30th	2
1999	Reynard 99i	Ford XD V8t	F	(Brazil) Luiz Garcia Jr. (R)	71	24	19	24		18			23	14	24											34th	0
1999	Lola B99/00	Ford XD V8t	F	(United States) Memo Gidley (R)	71													20	22		12	13	14	14		29th	4
2000						MIA	LBH	RIO	MOT	NAZ	MIL	DET	POR	CLE	TOR	MCH	CHI	MDO	ROA	VAN	LAG	GAT	HOU	SRF	FON		
2000	Lola B2K/00	Ford XF V8t	F	(Japan) Takuya Kurosawa (R)	19	24	13	19	20	DNS	Wth	12	22	25	23	Wth										29th	1
2000	Lola B2K/00	Ford XF V8t	F	(United States) Alex Barron	19															13	21	17	12	14	8	26th	6
2000	Lola B2K/00	Ford XF V8t	F	(Brazil) Gualter Salles	19												22	23	20							30th	0
2000	Lola B2K/00	Ford XF V8t	F	(Brazil) Gualter Salles	34	20	22	14																		30th	0
2000	Swift 011.c	Ford XF V8t	F	(Brazil) Tarso Marques	34				17	12	20	10	15	24	21	12	18	18	23	22	18	15	17	13	7	25th	11
2001						MTY	LBH	NAZ	MOT	MIL	DET	POR	CLE	TOR	MCH	CHI	MDO	ROA	VAN	LAU	ROC	HOU	LAG	SRF	FON		
2001	Lola B2K/00	Ford XF V8t	F	(Germany) Michael Krumm (R)	19	23	15																			31st	0
2001	Lola B2K/00	Ford XF V8t	F	(Brazil) Luiz Garcia Jr.	21	26	27																			32nd	0
2002						MTY	LBH	MOT	MIL	LAG	POR	CHI	TOR	CLE	VAN	MDO	ROA	MTL	DEN	ROC	MIA	SFR	FON	MXC			
2002	Lola B02/00	Ford XF V8t	B	(United Kingdom) Darren Manning (R)	19															9						21st	4
2002	Lola B02/00	Ford XF V8t	B	(Germany) André Lotterer (R)	19																			12		22nd	1
2003						STP	MTY	LBH	BRH	LAU	MIL	LAG	POR	CLE	TOR	VAN	ROA	MDO	MTL	DEN	MIA	MXC	SFR				
2003	Lola B02/00	Ford XFE V8t	B	(Mexico) Roberto González (R)	11	17																				24th	3
2003	Lola B02/00	Ford XFE V8t	B	(Malaysia) Alex Yoong (R)	11		9	19	18	17																23rd	4
2003	Lola B02/00	Ford XFE V8t	B	(United States) Geoff Boss (R)	11							16	13	16	14	DNS	13	14	14	12	10	20	9			20th	8
2003	Lola B02/00	Ford XFE V8t	B	(Brazil) Gualter Salles	11						13															19th	11
2003	Lola B02/00	Ford XFE V8t	B	(Brazil) Gualter Salles	19								18	17		DNS	11	17	12	18		15	6			19th	11
2003	Lola B02/00	Ford XFE V8t	B	(Switzerland) Joël Camathias (R)	19	9	11	14	13	16	15	13														22nd	6
2003	Lola B02/00	Ford XFE V8t	B	(Brazil) Alex Sperafico (R)	19										18						14					26th	0
2004						LBH	MTY	MIL	POR	CLE	TOR	VAN	ROA	DEN	MTL	LAG	LSV	SFR	MXC								
2004	Lola B02/00	Ford XFE V8t	B	(Spain) Oriol Servià	11	15	14	7	11	4	9	12	6	6	9	3	12	13	7							10th	199
2004	Lola B02/00	Ford XFE V8t	B	(Brazil) Tarso Marques	19	18	18												18							22nd	9
2004	Lola B02/00	Ford XFE V8t	B	(Argentina) Gastón Mazzacane (R)	19			16	13	12	6	DNS	18	15	12	13	15									17th	73
2004	Lola B02/00	Ford XFE V8t	B	(Czech Republic) Jarek Janiš (R)	19													18								24th	3
2005						LBH	MTY	MIL	POR	CLE	TOR	EDM	SJO	DEN	MTL	LSV	SRF	MXC									
2005	Lola B02/00	Ford XFE V8t	B	(Brazil) Ricardo Sperafico (R)	11	19	17	14	13	9	18	10	18	8	18	15	9	18								17th	92
2005	Lola B02/00	Ford XFE V8t	B	(Spain) Oriol Servià	19	11	9																			2nd	288
2005	Lola B02/00	Ford XFE V8t	B	(Canada) Michael Valiante (R)	19				11																	25th	10
2005	Lola B02/00	Ford XFE V8t	B	(Brazil) Tarso Marques	19					11																24th	10
2005	Lola B02/00	Ford XFE V8t	B	(United Kingdom) Ryan Dalziel (R)	19						9															23rd	13
2005	Lola B02/00	Ford XFE V8t	B	(Denmark) Ronnie Bremer (R)	19							6	7	7	17	18	8	19								12th	139
2006						LBH	HOU	MTY	MIL	POR	CLE	TOR	EDM	SJO	DEN	MTL	ROA	SRF	MXC								
2006	Lola B02/00	Ford XFE V8t	B	(Belgium) Jan Heylen (R)	11	7	13	16	12	15	5	16	16	11	11	9	9	14	13							14th	140
2006	Lola B02/00	Ford XFE V8t	B	(Brazil) Cristiano da Matta	19	5	9	9	13																	15th	134
2006	Lola B02/00	Ford XFE V8t	B	(Mexico) Mario Domínguez	19					14	6	11	8	5	13	10										9th	202
2006	Lola B02/00	Ford XFE V8t	B	(Uruguay) Juan Cáceres (R)	19												15									25th	6
2006	Lola B02/00	Ford XFE V8t	B	(Germany) Andreas Wirth (R)	19													9	15							20th	19
2007						LSV	LBH	HOU	POR	CLE	MTT	TOR	EDM	SJO	ROA	ZOL	ASN	SFR	MXC								
2007	Panoz DP01	Cosworth XFE V8t	B	(United Kingdom) Katherine Legge	11	6	10	16	17	15	11	16	16	16	15	11	12	15	15							15th	108
2007	Panoz DP01	Cosworth XFE V8t	B	(Brazil) Bruno Junqueira	19	7	6	7	13	16	17	5	7	7	9	2	3	3	7							7th	233

=== Complete IndyCar Series results ===
(key)

Year	Chassis	Engine	Drivers	No.	1	2	3	4	5	6	7	8	9	10	11	12	13	14	15	16	17	18	19	Pos	Pos
2008					HMS	STP	MOT^{1}	LBH^{1}	KAN	INDY	MIL	TXS	IOW	RIR	WGL	NSH	MDO	EDM	KTY	SNM	DET	CHI	SRF^{2}		
2008	Dallara IR-05	Honda HI8R V8	(Brazil) Bruno Junqueira	18	23	24			15	20	18	15	DNS	23	6	15	13	14	14	17	7	20	15	20th	256
2008	Panoz DP01	Cosworth XFE V8t	(Brazil) Bruno Junqueira	18				12																20th	256
2008	Dallara IR-05	Honda HI8R V8	(Brazil) Mario Moraes (R)	19	16	16			17	18	23	18	19	17	7	10	24	20	17	10	15	21	24	21st	244
2008	Panoz DP01	Cosworth XFE V8t	(Brazil) Mario Moraes (R)	19				20																21st	244
2009					STP	LBH	KAN	INDY	MIL	TXS	IOW	RIR	WGL	TOR	EDM	KTY	MDO	SNM	CHI	MOT	HMS				
2009	Dallara IR-05	Honda HI9R V8	(United Kingdom) Justin Wilson	18		22	14	23	15	15	18	14	1*	5	8	21	13	7	10	12	10			9th	354
2009	Dallara IR-05	Honda HI9R V8	(United Kingdom) Justin Wilson	19	3*																			9th	354
2009	Dallara IR-05	Honda HI9R V8	(South Africa) Tomas Scheckter	19				12																20th	195
2010					SAO	STP	ALA	LBH	KAN	INDY	TXS	IOW	WGL	TOR	EDM	MDO	SNM	CHI	KTY	MOT	HMS				
2010	Dallara IR-05	Honda HI10R V8	(United Kingdom) Alex Lloyd (R)	19	18	23	23	19	19	4	8	13	25	23	18	13	10	21	13	21	12			16th	266
2010	Dallara IR-05	Honda HI10R V8	(Venezuela) Milka Duno	18	21	24	24	25	26	DNQ	23	23	23	26	25	23	22	19	19	19	24			23rd	184
2011					STP	ALA	LBH	SAO	INDY	TXS		MIL	IOW	TOR	EDM	MDO	NHM	SNM	BAL	MOT	KTY	LSV			
2011	Dallara IR-05	Honda HI11R V8	(United Kingdom) James Jakes (R)	18	15	25	15	15	DNQ	25	28	15	25	18	18	23	18	19	27	13	21	C^{3}		22nd	189
2011	Dallara IR-05	Honda HI11R V8	(France) Sébastien Bourdais	19	DNS	11	27	26						6	6	9		6	28	6				23rd	188
2011	Dallara IR-05	Honda HI11R V8	(United Kingdom) Alex Lloyd	19					19	14	24	22	13				13				26	C^{3}		27th	85
2012					STP	ALA	LBH	SAO	INDY	DET	TXS	MIL	IOW	TOR	EDM	MDO	SNM	BAL	FON						
2012	Dallara DW12	Honda HI12TT V6t	(United Kingdom) Justin Wilson	18	10	19	10	22	7	22	1	23	10	21	9	18	11	17	23					15th	278
2012	Dallara DW12	Honda HI12TT V6t	(United Kingdom) James Jakes	19	26	16	11	15	15	23	10	21	13	8	25	19	12	24	12					22nd	232
2013					STP	ALA	LBH	SAO	INDY	DET		TXS	MIL	IOW	POC	TOR		MDO	SNM	BAL	HOU		FON		
2013	Dallara DW12	Honda HI13TT V6t	(United Kingdom) Justin Wilson	19	9	8	3	20	5	3	22	15	9	11	7	11	8	8	2	4	3	4	18	6th	472
2013	Dallara DW12	Honda HI13TT V6t	(Brazil) Ana Beatriz	18	22	24	14	25	15				19	22										29th	72
2013	Dallara DW12	Honda HI13TT V6t	(United Kingdom) Mike Conway	18						1*	3*					7	7				16	9		23rd	185
2013	Dallara DW12	Honda HI13TT V6t	(Australia) James Davison (R)	18														15	18					32nd	27
2013	Dallara DW12	Honda HI13TT V6t	(United Kingdom) Stefan Wilson (R)	18																16				33rd	14
2013	Dallara DW12	Honda HI13TT V6t	(United Kingdom) Pippa Mann	18								24			15								25	31st	34
2013	Dallara DW12	Honda HI13TT V6t	(United Kingdom) Pippa Mann	63					30															31st	34
2014					STP	LBH	ALA	IMS	INDY	DET		TXS	HOU		POC	IOW	TOR		MDO	MIL	SNM	FON			
2014	Dallara DW12	Honda HI14TT V6t	(Colombia) Carlos Huertas (R)	18	18	10	16	13	17	8	15	17	1	23	20	20	14	15	17	20	22	21		20th	314
2014	Dallara DW12	Honda HI14TT V6t	(United Kingdom) Justin Wilson	19	8	16	6	11	22	4	12	21	10	12	14	13	10	10	15	17	9	13		15th	395
2014	Dallara DW12	Honda HI14TT V6t	(United Kingdom) Pippa Mann	63					24															33rd	21
2015					STP	NOL	LBH	ALA	IMS	INDY	DET		TXS	TOR	FON	MIL	IOW	MDO	POC	SNM					
2015	Dallara DW12	Honda HI15TT V6t	(United Kingdom) Pippa Mann	63						22														29th	76
2015	Dallara DW12	Honda HI15TT V6t	(United Kingdom) Pippa Mann	18									17		13	24	23		13					29th	76
2015	Dallara DW12	Honda HI15TT V6t	(Colombia) Carlos Huertas	18	24	16			19	Wth														36th	31
2015	Dallara DW12	Honda HI15TT V6t	(United States) Rocky Moran Jr.	18			Wth																	NC	—
2015	Dallara DW12	Honda HI15TT V6t	(United States) Conor Daly (R)	18			17																	28th	76
2015	Dallara DW12	Honda HI15TT V6t	(Venezuela) Rodolfo González (R)	18				20			21	22		18				20		9				26th	94
2015	Dallara DW12	Honda HI15TT V6t	(France) Tristan Vautier	18						28														22nd	175
2015	Dallara DW12	Honda HI15TT V6t	(France) Tristan Vautier	19							17	4	20	17	17	16	12	6	21	23				22nd	175
2015	Dallara DW12	Honda HI15TT V6t	(Italy) Francesco Dracone (R)	19	23	23	21	23	22															34th	38
2015	Dallara DW12	Honda HI15TT V6t	(Australia) James Davison	19						27														38th	10
2016					STP	PHX	LBH	ALA	IMS	INDY	DET		ROA	IOW	TOR	MDO	POC	TXS	WGL	SNM					
2016	Dallara DW12	Honda HI16TT V6t	(United States) Conor Daly	18	13	16	13	20	6	29	2	6	21	21	15	6		21	4	21				18th	313
2016	Dallara DW12	Honda HI16TT V6t	(United States) Conor Daly	88													16							18th	313
2016	Dallara DW12	Honda HI16TT V6t	(Italy) Luca Filippi	19	20	20	17	18							14									26th	61
2016	Dallara DW12	Honda HI16TT V6t	(Colombia) Gabby Chaves	19					17	20	12	13	19	17				14						22nd	121
2016	Dallara DW12	Honda HI16TT V6t	(United States) RC Enerson (R)	19												19			9	19				28th	55
2016	Dallara DW12	Honda HI16TT V6t	(United Kingdom) Pippa Mann	19													17							29th	46
2016	Dallara DW12	Honda HI16TT V6t	(United Kingdom) Pippa Mann	63						18														29th	46
2017					STP	LBH	ALA	PHX	IMS	INDY	DET		TXS	ROA	IOW	TOR	MDO	POC	GAT	WGL	SNM				
2017	Dallara DW12	Honda HI17TT V6t	(France) Sébastien Bourdais	18	1*	2	8	19	22	Wth									10	17	9			21st	214
2017	Dallara DW12	Honda HI17TT V6t	(Australia) James Davison	18						20														35th	21
2017	Dallara DW12	Honda HI17TT V6t	(Mexico) Esteban Gutiérrez (R)	18							19	14		17	13	14	20	22						25th	91
2017	Dallara DW12	Honda HI17TT V6t	(France) Tristan Vautier	18									16											36th	15
2017	Dallara DW12	Honda HI17TT V6t	(United Arab Emirates) Ed Jones (R)	19	10	6	16	11	19	3	9	22	17	7	18	20	21	17	13	13	19			14th	354
2017	Dallara DW12	Honda HI17TT V6t	(United Kingdom) Pippa Mann	63						17														30th	32
2018					STP	PHX	LBH	ALA	IMS	INDY	DET		TXS	ROA	IOW	TOR	MDO	POC	GAT	POR	SNM				
2018	Dallara DW12	Honda HI18TT V6t	(United States) Conor Daly^{4}	17						21														29th	58
2018	Dallara DW12	Honda HI18TT V6t	(France) Sébastien Bourdais^{5}	18	1	13	13	5	4	28	13	21	8	13	11	19	6	4	21	3	6			7th	425
2018	Dallara DW12	Honda HI18TT V6t	(Canada) Zachary Claman DeMelo (R)	19	17		23	19	12	19			17	21	18	14								23rd	122
2018	Dallara DW12	Honda HI18TT V6t	(Brazil) Pietro Fittipaldi (R)	19		23											23	22	11	9	16			26th	91
2018	Dallara DW12	Honda HI18TT V6t	(United States) Santino Ferrucci (R)	19							22	20												27th	66
2018	Dallara DW12	Honda HI18TT V6t	(United States) Santino Ferrucci (R)	39																20	11			27th	66
2018	Dallara DW12	Honda HI18TT V6t	(United Kingdom) Pippa Mann	63						DNQ														NC	—
2019					STP	COA	ALA	LBH	IMS	INDY	DET		TXS	ROA	TOR	IOW	MDO	POC	GAT	POR	LAG				
2019	Dallara DW12	Honda HI19TT V6t	(France) Sébastien Bourdais^{5}	18	24	5	3	11	11	30	11	9	8	12	8	9	11	7	19	9	7			11th	387
2019	Dallara DW12	Honda HI19TT V6t	(United States) Santino Ferrucci (R)	19	9	20	15	21	10	7	19	10	4	19	11	12	12	4	4*	17	24			13th	351
2019	Dallara DW12	Honda HI19TT V6t	(Australia) James Davison^{6}	33						12														28th	36
2020					TXS	IMS	ROA		IOW		INDY	GAT		MDO		IMS		STP							
2020	Dallara DW12	Honda HI20TT V6t	(United States) Santino Ferrucci	18	21	9	6	6	13	18	4	16	10	14	14	15	12	23						13th	290
2020	Dallara DW12	Honda HI20TT V6t	Dale Coyne Racing with Rick Ware Racing & Byrd Belardi																						
2020	Dallara DW12	Honda HI20TT V6t	(Australia) James Davison R	51							33													34th	10
2020	Dallara DW12	Honda HI20TT V6t	Dale Coyne Racing with Team Goh																						
2020	Dallara DW12	Honda HI20TT V6t	(Spain) Álex Palou R	55	23	19	3	7	11	14	28	15	12	12	23	17	9	13						16th	238
2021					ALA	STP	TXS		IMS	INDY	DET		ROA	MDO	NSH	IMS	GAT	POR	LAG	LBH					
2021	Dallara DW12	Honda HI21TT V6t	(United Arab Emirates) Ed Jones^{5}	18	15	20	12	22	14	28	9	17	23	26	6	14	24	11	10	12				19th	233
2021	Dallara DW12	Honda HI21TT V6t	(France) Romain Grosjean R ^{7}	51	10	13			2		23	24	5	7	16	2	14	22	3	24				15th	272
2021	Dallara DW12	Honda HI21TT V6t	(Brazil) Pietro Fittipaldi^{7}	51			15	21		25														32nd	34
2021	Dallara DW12	Honda HI21TT V6t	(United States) Cody Ware R ^{7}	52									19		20	25								34th	26
2021	Dallara DW12	Honda HI21TT V6t	(United States) Ryan Norman R ^{7}	52										20										39th	10
2022					STP	TXS	LBH	ALA	IMS	INDY	DET	ROA	MDO	TOR	IOW		IMS	NSH	GAT	POR	LAG				
2022	Dallara DW12	Honda HI22TT V6t	(United States) David Malukas R ^{8}	18	26	11	21	20	12	16	11	16	9	12	14	8	13	20	2	14	13			16th	305
2022	Dallara DW12	Honda HI22TT V6t	(Japan) Takuma Sato^{7}	51	10	20	17	13	7	25	13	15	14	25	21	10	15	21	5	18	23			19th	258
2023					STP	TXS	LBH	ALA	IMS	INDY	DET	ROA	MDO	TOR	IOW		NSH	IMS	GAT	POR	LAG				
2023	Dallara DW12	Honda HI23TT V6t	(United States) David Malukas^{8}	18	10	4	20	19	26	29	23	27	6	20	12	8	27	16	3	8	20			17th	265
2023	Dallara DW12	Honda HI23TT V6t	(United States) Sting Ray Robb R ^{7}	51	16	25	18	27	27	31	22	22	22	19	25	28	17	22	21	23	12			23rd	147
2024					STP	THE^{1}	LBH	ALA	IMS	INDY	DET	ROA	LAG	MDO	IOW		TOR	GAT	POR	MIL		NSH			
2024	Dallara DW12	Honda HI24TT V6t	(United Kingdom) Jack Harvey	18	17		25	13	18		17	25	25	26	25	Wth		20	24	16	14	13		25th	143
2024	Dallara DW12	Honda HI24TT V6t	(United States) Conor Daly	18												27								26th	119
2024	Dallara DW12	Honda HI24TT V6t	(New Zealand) Hunter McElrea R	18													24							41st	6
2024	Dallara DW12	Honda HI24TT V6t	(United States) Nolan Siegel R	18		DNQ				DNQ														23rd	154
2024	Dallara DW12	Honda HI24TT V6t	(United States) Nolan Siegel R	51			20																	23rd	154
2024	Dallara DW12	Honda HI24TT V6t	(United States) Colin Braun R ^{7}	51	20	DNQ																		40th	10
2024	Dallara DW12	Honda HI24TT V6t	(Italy) Luca Ghiotto R ^{7}	51				21	25			22	27											34th	27
2024	Dallara DW12	Honda HI24TT V6t	(United Kingdom) Katherine Legge^{7}	51						29					17	24		27		19	15	26		29th	61
2024	Dallara DW12	Honda HI24TT V6t	(France) Tristan Vautier^{7}	51							18													38th	12
2024	Dallara DW12	Honda HI24TT V6t	(United Kingdom) Toby Sowery R ^{7}	51										13			15		17					31st	45
2025					STP	THE	LBH	ALA	IMS	INDY	DET	GAT	ROA	MDO	IOW		TOR	LAG	POR	MIL	NSH				
2025	Dallara DW12	Honda HI25TT V6t	(Netherlands) Rinus VeeKay	18	9	17	19	4	9	27	27	7	10	9	16	12	2	23	17	15	13			14th	305
2025	Dallara DW12	Honda HI25TT V6t	(United States) Jacob Abel R	51	23	25	26	27	24	DNQ	18	21	23	22	27	11	23	26	23	21	23			27th	123
2026					STP	PHX	ARL	ALA	LBH	IMS	INDY	DET	GAT	ROA	MOH	NSH	POR	MAR	D.C.	MIL		LAG			
2026	Dallara DW12	Honda HI26TT V6t	(France) Romain Grosjean	18	8	25	23	15	21	21	9	20	15	15	23	14	17	2	10	19	24	18		19th	259
2026	Dallara DW12	Honda HI26TT V6t	(Norway) Dennis Hauger R	19	10	15	16	23	11	8	19	13	25	20	25	21	13	15	15	21	21	25		22nd	228

* Season still in progress

1. Races run on same day, Long Beach to Champ Car specifications.
2. Non-points-paying, exhibition race.
3. The final race at Las Vegas was canceled due to Dan Wheldon's death.
4. "dba Thom Burns Racing".
5. In conjunction with Vasser Sullivan Racing.
6. In conjunction with Byrd-Hollinger-Belardi.
7. In conjunction with Rick Ware Racing.
8. In conjunction with HMD Motorsports.

== IndyCar wins ==
#	Season	Date	Track / Race	No.	Winning driver	Chassis	Engine	Tire	Grid	Laps Led
1	2009	July 5	Watkins Glen International (R)	18	(United Kingdom) Justin Wilson	Dallara IR-05	Honda HI7R V8	Firestone	2	49
2	2012	June 9	Texas Motor Speedway (O)	18	(United Kingdom) Justin Wilson (2)	Dallara DW12	Honda HI12TT V6t	Firestone	17	11
3	2013	June 1	Detroit Belle Isle Grand Prix Race 1 (S)	18	(United Kingdom) Mike Conway	Dallara DW12	Honda HI13TT V6t	Firestone	2	47
4	2014	June 28	Grand Prix of Houston (S)	18	(Colombia) Carlos Huertas (R)	Dallara DW12	Honda HI14TT V6t	Firestone	19	7
5	2017	March 12	Streets of St. Petersburg (S)	18	(France) Sébastien Bourdais	Dallara DW12	Honda HI17TT V6t	Firestone	21	69
6	2018	March 11	Streets of St. Petersburg (S)	18	(France) Sébastien Bourdais (2)	Dallara DW12	Honda HI18TT V6t	Firestone	14	30

== Past and present drivers ==
- (United States) Jacob Abel (2025)
- (Belgium) Éric Bachelart (1992–1993, 1995)
- (Italy) Mauro Baldi (1994)
- (Italy) Fulvio Ballabio (1989–1990)
- (United States) Alex Barron (2000)
- (Brazil) Ana Beatriz (2013)
- (United States) Townsend Bell (2001)
- (Canada) Ross Bentley (1991–1995)
- (United States) Tony Bettenhausen Jr. (1989)
- (United States) Tom Bigelow (1984)
- (United States) Brian Bonner (1992–1993)
- (United States) Geoff Boss (2003)
- (France) Sébastien Bourdais (2011, 2017–2019)
- (United States) Colin Braun (2024)
- (Denmark) Ronnie Bremer (2005)
- (United States) Robbie Buhl (1993–1994)
- (Uruguay) Juan Cáceres (2006)
- (Switzerland) Joël Camathias (2003)
- (Colombia) Gabby Chaves (2016)
- (United Kingdom) Mike Conway (2013)
- (United States) Dale Coyne (1984–1989, 1991)
- (Italy) Guido Daccò (1989)
- (United States) Conor Daly (2015-2016)
- (United Kingdom) Ryan Dalziel (2005)
- (Brazil) Cristiano da Matta (2006)
- (Germany) Christian Danner (1997)
- (Australia) James Davison (2013, 2015, 2017, 2019–2020)
- (Canada) Zachary Claman DeMelo (2018)
- (United States) Dominic Dobson (1988)
- (Mexico) Mario Domínguez (2006)
- (Italy) Francesco Dracone (2015)
- (Venezuela) Milka Duno (2010)
- (United States) RC Enerson (2016)
- (Netherlands) Cornelius Euser (1991)
- (United States) Santino Ferrucci (2018–2020)
- (Italy) Luca Filippi (2016)
- (Brazil) Pietro Fittipaldi (2018, 2021)
- (France) Franck Fréon (1995)
- (Brazil) Luiz Garcia Jr. (1999, 2001)
- (Italy) Luca Ghiotto (2024)
- (Mexico) Memo Gidley (1999)
- (Mexico) Roberto González (2003)
- (Venezuela) Rodolfo González (2015)
- (United States) Michael Greenfield (1991)
- (France) Romain Grosjean (2021, 2026)
- (Mexico) Esteban Gutiérrez (2017)
- (United States) Dean Hall (1990)
- (United States) Scott Harrington (1989)
- (United Kingdom) Jack Harvey (2024)
- (Norway) Dennis Hauger (2026–present)
- (Belgium) Jan Heylen (2006)
- (Colombia) Carlos Huertas (2014–2015)
- (United Kingdom) James Jakes (2011-2012)
- (Czech Republic) Jaroslav Janiš (2004)
- (United States) Paul Jasper (1997)
- (United States) Ken Johnson (1989)
- (United Arab Emirates) Ed Jones (2017, 2021)
- (Mexico) Michel Jourdain Jr. (1997–1999)
- (Brazil) Bruno Junqueira (2007–2008)
- (Germany) Michael Krumm (2001)
- (Japan) Takuya Kurosawa (2000)
- (United States) Buddy Lazier (1991, 1995)
- (United Kingdom) Katherine Legge (2007, 2024)
- (United States) Randy Lewis (1991)
- (United Kingdom) Alex Lloyd (2010–2011)
- (Germany) André Lotterer (2002)
- (United States) David Malukas (2022–2023)
- (United Kingdom) Pippa Mann (2013–2018)
- (Brazil) Tarso Marques (2000, 2004–2005)
- (Japan) Hiro Matsushita (1996)
- (Argentina) Gastón Mazzacane (2004)
- (Italy) Andrea Montermini (1994)
- (Brazil) Mario Moraes (2008)
- (Brazil) Roberto Moreno (1996–1997)
- (United States) Charlie Nearburg (1997)
- (United States) Ryan Norman (2021)
- (Spain) Álex Palou (2020)
- (United States) John Paul Jr. (1989)
- (United States) Sting Ray Robb (2023)
- (Brazil) Gualter Salles (1998–2000, 2003)
- (Japan) Takuma Sato (2022)
- (South Africa) Tomas Scheckter (2009)
- (Spain) Oriol Servià (2004–2005)
- (United States) Nolan Siegel (2024)
- (United Kingdom) Toby Sowery (2024)
- (Brazil) Alex Sperafico (2003)
- (Brazil) Ricardo Sperafico (2005)
- (United States) Brian Till (1994)
- (Canada) Paul Tracy (1991)
- (United States) Johnny Unser (1993–1994)
- (Canada) Michael Valiante (2005)
- (France) Tristan Vautier (2015, 2017, 2024)
- (Netherlands) Rinus Veekay (2025)
- (United States) Dennis Vitolo (1991–1993, 1997–1999)
- (United States) Cody Ware (2021)
- (Germany) Andreas Wirth (2006)
- (United Kingdom) Justin Wilson (2009, 2012–2014)
- (United Kingdom) Stefan Wilson (2013)
- (United States) Jeff Wood (1991)
- (Malaysia) Alex Yoong (2003)
- (Italy) Alessandro Zampedri (1994–1995)
