= 2019 Chevrolet Detroit Grand Prix =

(United States) 2019 Detroit
Race details
7th and 8th round of the 2019 IndyCar Series season
← Previous race	Next race →
- Date: June 1 and 2, 2019
- Official name: Chevrolet Detroit Grand Prix Presented by Lear Corporation
- Location: The Raceway on Belle Isle
- Course: Temporary street circuit 2.350 mi / 3.782 km
- Distance: 70 laps 164.500 mi / 264.737 km
Race 1

Pole position
- Driver: (United States) Alexander Rossi (Andretti Autosport)
- Time: 1:14.1989

Fastest lap
- Driver: (United States) Josef Newgarden (Team Penske)
- Time: 1:16.5266 (on lap 43 of 47)

Podium
- First: (United States) Josef Newgarden (Team Penske)
- Second: (United States) Alexander Rossi (Andretti Autosport)
- Third: (Japan) Takuma Sato (Rahal Letterman Lanigan Racing)
Race 2

Pole position
- Driver: (United States) Josef Newgarden (Team Penske)
- Time: 1:14.8607

Fastest lap
- Driver: (France) Simon Pagenaud (Team Penske)
- Time: 1:15.1096 (on lap 41 of 70)

Podium
- First: (New Zealand) Scott Dixon (Chip Ganassi Racing)
- Second: (Sweden) Marcus Ericsson (Arrow Schmidt Peterson Motorsports)
- Third: (Australia) Will Power (Team Penske)

The Chevrolet Detroit Grand Prix presented by Lear Corporation was the lone doubleheader event of the 2019 IndyCar Series season, consisting of the 7th and 8th rounds of the championship. The event was held at The Raceway on Belle Isle in Detroit, Michigan. Josef Newgarden won a shortened Race 1, and Scott Dixon won the Sunday race.

== Race 1 – Saturday, June 1 ==
=== Results ===
Icon	Meaning
R	Rookie
W	Past winner

==== Qualifying ====
Pos	No.	Name	Group	Time
1	27	(United States) Alexander Rossi	2	1:14.1989
2	2	(United States) Josef Newgarden	1	1:14.8272
3	9	(New Zealand) Scott Dixon W	2	1:14.3995
4	10	(Sweden) Felix Rosenqvist R	1	1:14.9984
5	88	(United States) Colton Herta R	2	1:14.8811
6	28	(United States) Ryan Hunter-Reay W	1	1:15.1423
7	31	(Mexico) Patricio O'Ward R	2	1:15.0772
8	26	(United States) Zach Veach	1	1:15.1487
9	30	(Japan) Takuma Sato	2	1:15.3134
10	5	(Canada) James Hinchcliffe	1	1:15.1750
11	15	(United States) Graham Rahal W	2	1:15.3945
12	12	(Australia) Will Power W	1	1:15.2111
13	22	(France) Simon Pagenaud W	2	1:15.4557
14	20	(United Arab Emirates) Ed Jones	1	1:15.6341
15	7	(Sweden) Marcus Ericsson R	2	1:15.4811
16	18	(France) Sébastien Bourdais W	1	1:15.6691
17	21	(United States) Spencer Pigot	2	1:15.5621
18	98	(United States) Marco Andretti	1	1:15.8871
19	59	(United Kingdom) Max Chilton	2	1:16.0801
20	4	(Brazil) Matheus Leist	1	1:15.9628
21	14	(Brazil) Tony Kanaan W	2	1:16.6842
22	19	(United States) Santino Ferrucci	1	1:16.3830
OFFICIAL BOX SCORE

==== Race ====
Race shortened to 43 laps due to time limit.

Pos	No.	Driver	Team	Engine	Laps	Time/Retired	Pit Stops	Grid	Laps Led	Pts.
1	2	(United States) Josef Newgarden	Team Penske	Chevrolet	43	1:15:30.5932	1	2	25	54
2	27	(United States) Alexander Rossi	Andretti Autosport	Honda	43	+0.8237	1	1	18	42
3	30	(Japan) Takuma Sato	Rahal Letterman Lanigan Racing	Honda	43	+11.4760	1	9		35
4	10	(Sweden) Felix Rosenqvist R	Chip Ganassi Racing	Honda	43	+11.8833	1	4		32
5	28	(United States) Ryan Hunter-Reay W	Andretti Autosport	Honda	43	+12.2263	1	6		30
6	22	(France) Simon Pagenaud W	Team Penske	Chevrolet	43	+12.5127	1	13		28
7	15	(United States) Graham Rahal W	Rahal Letterman Lanigan Racing	Honda	43	+13.1515	1	11		26
8	26	(United States) Zach Veach	Andretti Autosport	Honda	43	+14.0022	1	8		24
9	5	(Canada) James Hinchcliffe	Arrow Schmidt Peterson Motorsports	Honda	43	+15.2409	1	10		22
10	21	(United States) Spencer Pigot	Ed Carpenter Racing	Chevrolet	43	+16.1462	1	17		20
11	18	(France) Sébastien Bourdais W	Dale Coyne Racing with Vasser-Sullivan	Honda	43	+16.9309	1	16		19
12	88	(United States) Colton Herta R	Harding Steinbrenner Racing	Honda	43	+17.2807	1	5		18
13	7	(Sweden) Marcus Ericsson R	Arrow Schmidt Peterson Motorsports	Honda	43	+17.9085	1	15		17
14	31	(Mexico) Patricio O'Ward R	Carlin	Chevrolet	43	+24.0822	1	7		16
15	14	(Brazil) Tony Kanaan W	A. J. Foyt Enterprises	Chevrolet	43	+25.6122	1	21		15
16	98	(United States) Marco Andretti	Andretti Herta Autosport w/ Marco Andretti & Curb-Agajanian	Honda	43	+26.0652	2	18		14
17	59	(United Kingdom) Max Chilton	Carlin	Chevrolet	43	+26.4759	1	19		13
18	12	(Australia) Will Power W	Team Penske	Chevrolet	43	+33.0561	3	12		12
19	19	(United States) Santino Ferrucci	Dale Coyne Racing	Honda	43	+43.1639	1	22		11
20	20	(United Arab Emirates) Ed Jones	Ed Carpenter Racing Scuderia Corsa	Chevrolet	42	+1 lap	2	14		10
21	4	(Brazil) Matheus Leist	A.J. Foyt Enterprises	Chevrolet	30	Contact	5	20		9
22	9	(New Zealand) Scott Dixon W	Chip Ganassi Racing	Honda	23	Contact	1	3		8
OFFICIAL BOX SCORE

Notes: ^{1} Points include 1 point for leading at least 1 lap during a race, an additional 2 points for leading the most race laps. For Detroit only, 1 bonus point was awarded to the fastest qualifier from both groups.

=== Championship standings after Race 1 ===
Drivers' Championship standings

	Pos	Driver	Points
1	1	(United States) Josef Newgarden	303
1	2	(France) Simon Pagenaud	278
	3	(United States) Alexander Rossi	270
	4	(Japan) Takuma Sato	238
	5	(New Zealand) Scott Dixon	211

Manufacturer standings

Pos	Manufacturer	Points
1	(Japan) Honda	567
2	(United States) Chevrolet	541

- Note: Only the top five positions are included.

== Race 2 – Sunday, June 2 ==
=== Results ===
Icon	Meaning
R	Rookie
W	Past winner

==== Qualifying ====
Pos	No.	Name	Group	Time
1	2	(United States) Josef Newgarden W	2	1:14.8607
2	27	(United States) Alexander Rossi	1	1:15.1825
3	26	(United States) Zach Veach	2	1:15.2625
4	88	(United States) Colton Herta R	1	1:15.6478
5	5	(Canada) James Hinchcliffe	2	1:15.4393
6	9	(New Zealand) Scott Dixon W	1	1:15.8002
7	10	(Sweden) Felix Rosenqvist R	2	1:15.4958
8	31	(Mexico) Patricio O'Ward R	1	1:15.9263
9	18	(France) Sébastien Bourdais W	2	1:15.5909
10	21	(United States) Spencer Pigot	1	1:15.9738
11	12	(Australia) Will Power W	2	1:15.6945
12	7	(Sweden) Marcus Ericsson R	1	1:16.1279
13	20	(United Arab Emirates) Ed Jones	2	1:15.7118
14	22	(France) Simon Pagenaud W	1	1:16.2190
15	28	(United States) Ryan Hunter-Reay W	2	1:15.7208
16	30	(Japan) Takuma Sato	1	1:16.2313
17	19	(United States) Santino Ferrucci	2	1:16.0847
18	14	(Brazil) Tony Kanaan W	1	1:16.5848
19	98	(United States) Marco Andretti	2	1:16.1104
20	59	(United Kingdom) Max Chilton	1	1:17.2611
21	4	(Brazil) Matheus Leist	2	1:16.9552
22	15	(United States) Graham Rahal W	1	1:17.3698
OFFICIAL BOX SCORE

==== Race ====
Pos	No.	Driver	Team	Engine	Laps	Time/Retired	Pit Stops	Grid	Laps Led	Pts.
1	9	(New Zealand) Scott Dixon W	Chip Ganassi Racing	Honda	70	1:52:18.9365	3	6	44	53
2	7	(Sweden) Marcus Ericsson R	Arrow Schmidt Peterson Motorsports	Honda	70	+1.9419	4	12	2	41
3	12	(Australia) Will Power W	Team Penske	Chevrolet	70	+3.6570	4	11	3	36
4	28	(United States) Ryan Hunter-Reay W	Andretti Autosport	Honda	70	+4.5238	4	15		32
5	27	(United States) Alexander Rossi	Andretti Autosport	Honda	70	+5.1877	4	2		31
6	98	(United States) Marco Andretti	Andretti Herta Autosport w/ Marco Andretti & Curb-Agajanian	Honda	70	+6.6330	4	19		30
7	15	(United States) Graham Rahal W	Rahal Letterman Lanigan Racing	Honda	70	+7.1404	3	22		26
8	26	(United States) Zach Veach	Andretti Autosport	Honda	70	+8.0411	4	3		24
9	18	(France) Sébastien Bourdais W	Dale Coyne Racing with Vasser-Sullivan	Honda	70	+8.7886	5	9		22
10	19	(United States) Santino Ferrucci	Dale Coyne Racing	Honda	70	+9.4809	3	17	20	21
11	31	(Mexico) Patricio O'Ward R	Carlin	Chevrolet	70	+9.8997	6	8		19
12	88	(United States) Colton Herta R	Harding Steinbrenner Racing	Honda	70	+11.8528	4	4		18
13	30	(Japan) Takuma Sato	Rahal Letterman Lanigan Racing	Honda	70	+13.5500	5	16		17
14	20	(United Arab Emirates) Ed Jones	Ed Carpenter Racing Scuderia Corsa	Chevrolet	70	+14.6489	6	13		16
15	59	(United Kingdom) Max Chilton	Carlin	Chevrolet	70	+14.7810	6	20		15
16	10	(Sweden) Felix Rosenqvist R	Chip Ganassi Racing	Honda	64	Contact	3	7		14
17	22	(France) Simon Pagenaud W	Team Penske	Chevrolet	58	+12 laps	5	14		13
18	5	(Canada) James Hinchcliffe	Arrow Schmidt Peterson Motorsports	Honda	52	Off Course	4	5		12
19	2	(United States) Josef Newgarden W	Team Penske	Chevrolet	49	+21 laps	3	1	1	13
20	4	(Brazil) Matheus Leist	A. J. Foyt Enterprises	Chevrolet	23	Mechanical	4	21		10
21	21	(United States) Spencer Pigot	Ed Carpenter Racing	Chevrolet	13	Contact	0	10		9
22	14	(Brazil) Tony Kanaan W	A. J. Foyt Enterprises	Chevrolet	0	Contact	0	18		8
OFFICIAL BOX SCORE

Notes: ^{1} Points include 1 point for leading at least 1 lap during a race, an additional 2 points for leading the most race laps. For Detroit only, 1 bonus point was awarded to the fastest qualifier from both groups.

=== Championship standings after Race 2 ===
Drivers' Championship standings

	Pos	Driver	Points
	1	(United States) Josef Newgarden	316
1	2	(United States) Alexander Rossi	301
1	3	(France) Simon Pagenaud	291
1	4	(New Zealand) Scott Dixon	264
1	5	(Japan) Takuma Sato	255

Manufacturer standings

Pos	Manufacturer	Points
1	(Japan) Honda	662
2	(United States) Chevrolet	596

- Note: Only the top five positions are included.

Previous race: 2019 Indianapolis 500	IndyCar Series; 2019 season	Next race: 2019 DXC Technology 600
Previous race: 2018 Chevrolet Detroit Grand Prix	Chevrolet Detroit Grand Prix	Next race: 2021 Chevrolet Detroit Grand Prix
