= 2019 DXC Technology 600 =

(United States) 2019 DXC Technology 600
Race details
9th round of the 2019 IndyCar season
← Previous race	Next race →
- Date: June 8, 2019
- Official name: DXC Technology 600
- Location: Texas Motor Speedway
- Course: Permanent racing facility 1.455 mi / 2.342 km
- Distance: 248 laps 360.8 mi / 580.8 km

Pole position
- Driver: (Japan) Takuma Sato (Rahal Letterman Lanigan Racing)
- Time: 23.5173 + 23.5565 = 47.0738

Fastest lap
- Driver: (Japan) Takuma Sato (Rahal Letterman Lanigan Racing)
- Time: 23.5657 (on lap 69 of 248)

Podium
- First: (United States) Josef Newgarden (Team Penske)
- Second: (United States) Alexander Rossi (Andretti Autosport)
- Third: (United States) Graham Rahal (Rahal Letterman Lanigan Racing)

The 2019 DXC Technology 600 was the ninth round of the 2019 IndyCar Series season, contested over 248 laps at the 1.5-mile (2.4 km) Texas Motor Speedway in Fort Worth, Texas. Takuma Sato claimed his second pole of the year, while Josef Newgarden claimed the 13th win of his career and his 3rd of the season.

== Results ==
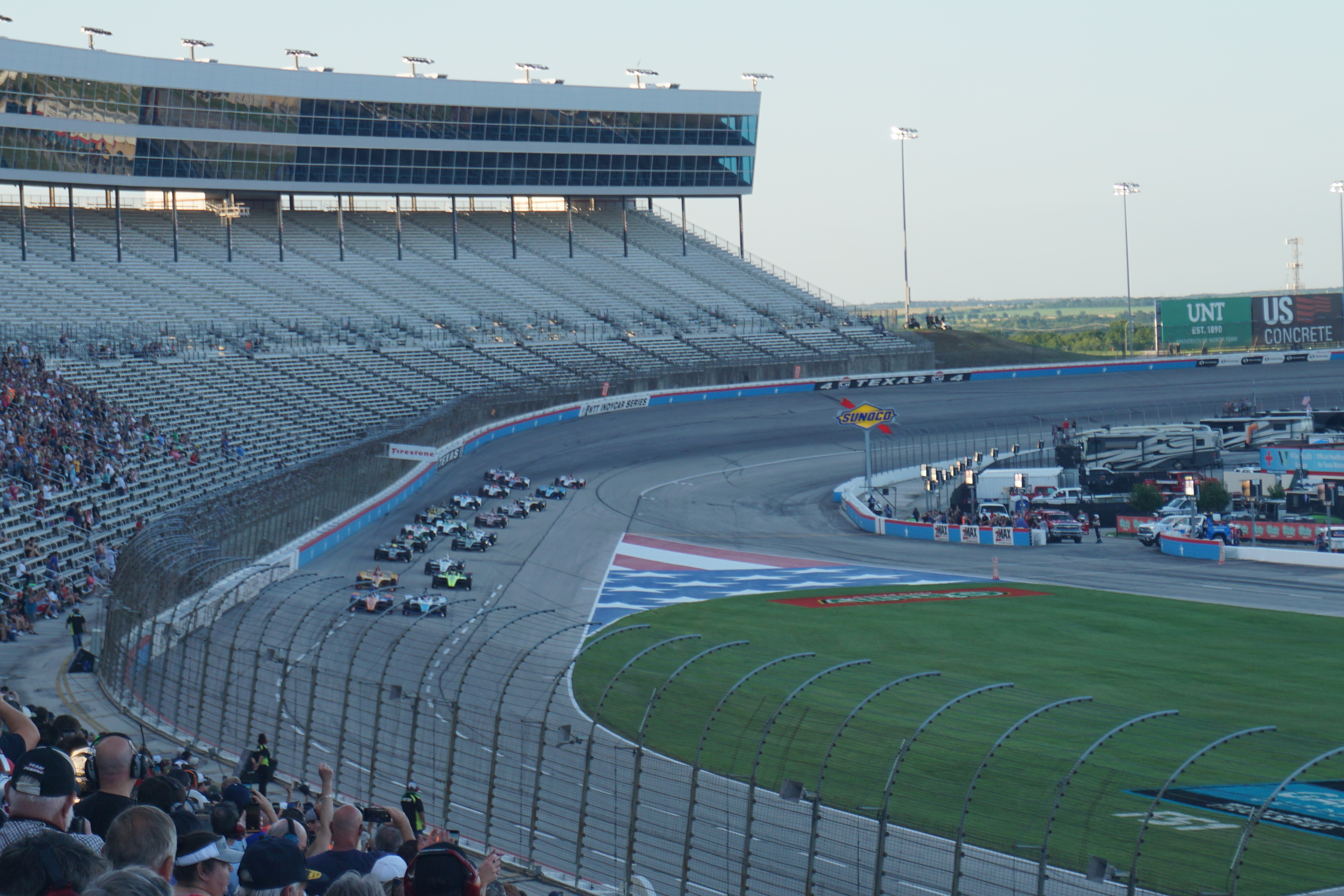
Start of the race

Key	Meaning
R	Rookie
W	Past winner

=== Qualifying ===
Pos	No.	Name	Lap 1 Time	Lap 2 Time	Total Time	Avg. Speed (mph)
1	30	(Japan) Takuma Sato	23.5173	23.5565	47.0738	220.250
2	9	(New Zealand) Scott Dixon W	23.5212	23.5714	47.0926	220.162
3	18	(France) Sébastien Bourdais	23.5163	23.6654	47.1817	219.746
4	28	(United States) Ryan Hunter-Reay	23.5870	23.6396	47.2266	219.537
5	22	(France) Simon Pagenaud	23.6366	23.6293	47.2659	219.355
6	21	(United States) Spencer Pigot	23.6954	23.6256	47.3210	219.099
7	2	(United States) Josef Newgarden	23.7189	23.6958	47.4147	218.666
8	5	(Canada) James Hinchcliffe	23.7526	23.7071	47.4597	218.459
9	15	(United States) Graham Rahal W	23.7138	23.7481	47.4619	218.449
10	88	(United States) Colton Herta R	23.7011	23.7701	47.4712	218.406
11	27	(United States) Alexander Rossi	23.7846	23.7108	47.4954	218.295
12	26	(United States) Zach Veach	23.7560	23.7875	47.5435	218.074
13	20	(United States) Ed Carpenter W	23.7939	23.7697	47.5636	217.982
14	7	(Sweden) Marcus Ericsson R	23.7726	23.7973	47.5699	217.953
15	12	(Australia) Will Power W	23.8636	23.7180	47.5816	217.899
16	10	(Sweden) Felix Rosenqvist R	23.8377	23.9010	47.7387	217.182
17	23	(United States) Charlie Kimball	23.8581	23.8845	47.7426	217.165
18	19	(United States) Santino Ferrucci R	23.8588	23.9061	47.7649	217.063
19	59	(United States) Conor Daly	23.9992	23.9620	47.9612	216.175
20	4	(Brazil) Matheus Leist	24.0675	24.1349	48.2024	215.093
21	98	(United States) Marco Andretti	23.6818	26.4291	50.1109	206.901
22	14	(Brazil) Tony Kanaan W			No Time	
OFFICIAL BOX SCORE

=== Race ===
Pos	No.	Driver	Team	Engine	Laps	Time/Retired	Pit Stops	Grid	Laps Led	Pts.
1	2	(United States) Josef Newgarden	Team Penske	Chevrolet	248	1:55:08.8666	4	7	54	51
2	27	(United States) Alexander Rossi	Andretti Autosport	Honda	248	+0.8164	3	11	3	41
3	15	(United States) Graham Rahal W	Rahal Letterman Lanigan Racing	Honda	248	+1.4928	3	9	3	36
4	19	(United States) Santino Ferrucci R	Dale Coyne Racing	Honda	248	+1.7266	3	18		32
5	28	(United States) Ryan Hunter-Reay	Andretti Autosport	Honda	248	+2.2019	4	4	90	33
6	22	(France) Simon Pagenaud	Team Penske	Chevrolet	248	+2.8789	3	5		28
7	7	(Sweden) Marcus Ericsson R	Arrow Schmidt Peterson Motorsports	Honda	248	+3.9271	5	14	2	27
8	18	(France) Sébastien Bourdais	Dale Coyne Racing with Vasser-Sullivan	Honda	248	+4.3306	4	3	3	25
9	12	(Australia) Will Power W	Team Penske	Chevrolet	247	+1 lap	5	15		22
10	98	(United States) Marco Andretti	Andretti Herta Autosport with Marco Andretti & Curb-Agajanian	Honda	247	+1 lap	4	21		20
11	59	(United States) Conor Daly	Carlin	Chevrolet	247	+1 lap	4	19		19
12	10	(Sweden) Felix Rosenqvist R	Chip Ganassi Racing	Honda	246	+2 laps	6	16		18
13	20	(United States) Ed Carpenter W	Ed Carpenter Racing	Chevrolet	246	+2 laps	5	13		17
14	21	(United States) Spencer Pigot	Ed Carpenter Racing	Chevrolet	247	+2 laps	4	6		16
15	30	(Japan) Takuma Sato	Rahal Letterman Lanigan Racing	Honda	245	+3 laps	6	1	60	17
16	14	(Brazil) Tony Kanaan W	A. J. Foyt Enterprises	Chevrolet	245	+3 laps	6	22		14
17	9	(New Zealand) Scott Dixon W	Chip Ganassi Racing	Honda	228	Contact	3	2	33	14
18	88	(United States) Colton Herta R	Harding Steinbrenner Racing	Honda	228	Contact	3	10		12
19	5	(Canada) James Hinchcliffe	Arrow Schmidt Peterson Motorsports	Honda	218	Contact	3	8		11
20	26	(United States) Zach Veach	Andretti Autosport	Honda	172	Handling	3	12		10
21	23	(United States) Charlie Kimball	Carlin	Chevrolet	86	Mechanical	1	17		9
22	4	(Brazil) Matheus Leist R	A. J. Foyt Enterprises	Chevrolet	73	Handling	1	20		8
OFFICIAL BOX SCORE

Notes: ^{1} Points include 1 point for leading at least 1 lap during a race, an additional 2 points for leading the most race laps, and 1 point for Pole Position.

== Championship standings after the race ==
Drivers' Championship standings

Pos	Driver	Points
1	(United States) Josef Newgarden	367
2	(United States) Alexander Rossi	342
3	(France) Simon Pagenaud	319
4	(New Zealand) Scott Dixon	278
5	(Japan) Takuma Sato	272

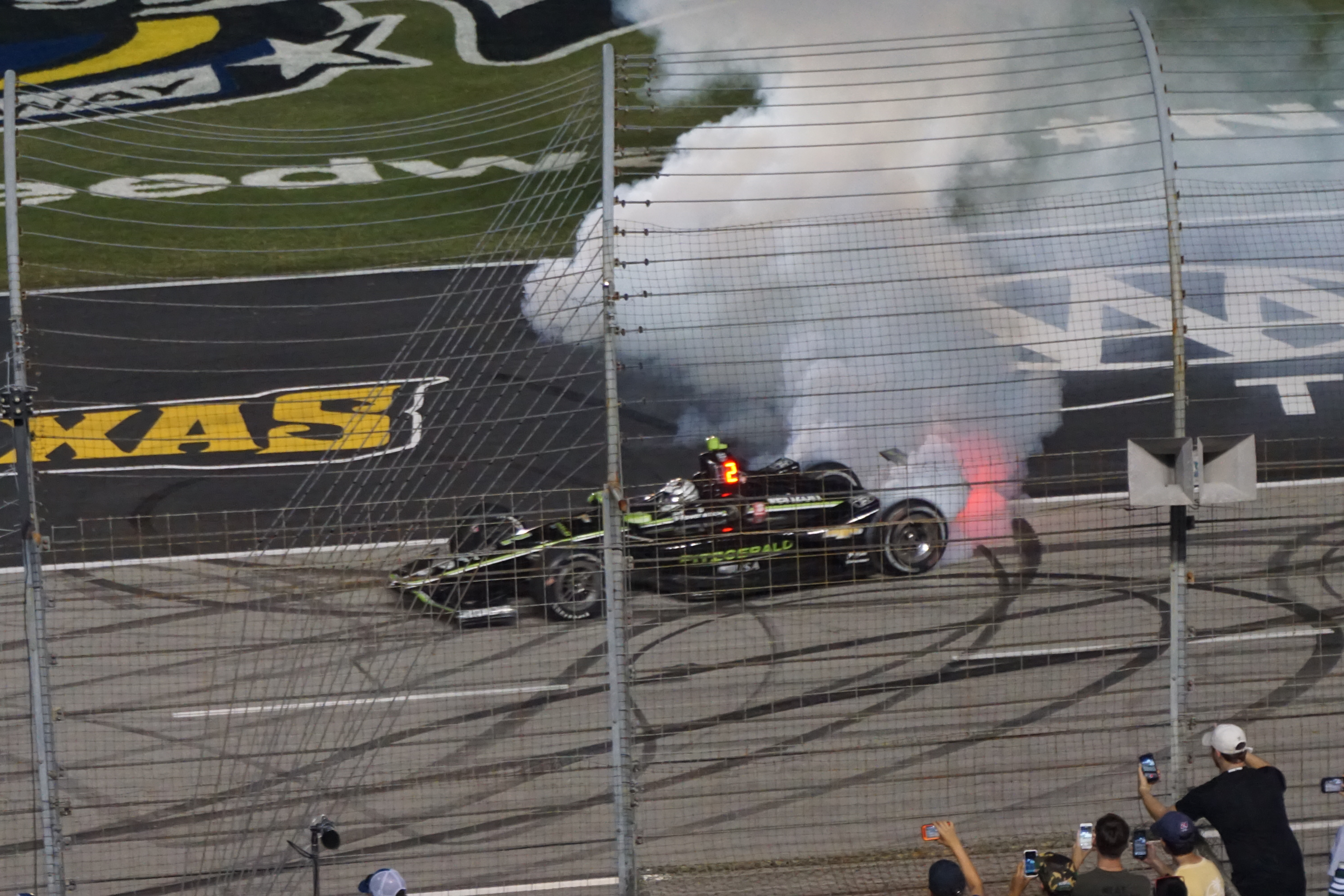
Josef Newgarden celebrating after winning the race

Manufacturer standings

Pos	Manufacturer	Points
1	(Japan) Honda	738
2	(United States) Chevrolet	679

- Note: Only the top five positions are included.

Previous race: 2019 Chevrolet Detroit Grand Prix	IndyCar Series; 2019 season	Next race: 2019 REV Group Grand Prix at Road America
Previous race: 2018 DXC Technology 600	DXC Technology 600	Next race: 2020 Genesys 300
