= 2018 Chevrolet Detroit Grand Prix =

(United States) 2018 Detroit
Race details
7th and 8th round of the 2018 IndyCar Series season
← Previous race	Next race →
- Date: June 2 and 3, 2018
- Official name: Chevrolet Detroit Grand Prix presented by Lear Corporation
- Location: The Raceway on Belle Isle
- Course: Temporary street circuit 2.350 mi / 3.782 km
- Distance: 70 laps 164.500 mi / 264.737 km
Race 1

Pole position
- Driver: (United States) (United States) Marco Andretti (Andretti Herta Autosport with Curb-Agajanian)
- Time: 1:14.8514

Fastest lap
- Driver: (United States) (United States) Ryan Hunter-Reay (Andretti Autosport)
- Time: 1:15.8049 (on lap 40 of 70)

Podium
- First: (New Zealand) (New Zealand) Scott Dixon (Chip Ganassi Racing)
- Second: (United States) (United States) Ryan Hunter-Reay (Andretti Autosport)
- Third: (United States) (United States) Alexander Rossi (Andretti Autosport)
Race 2

Pole position
- Driver: (United States) Alexander Rossi ( (United States) Andretti Autosport)
- Time: 1:33.3143

Fastest lap
- Driver: (United States) (United States) Ryan Hunter-Reay (Andretti Autosport)
- Time: 1:15.0590 (on lap 59 of 70)

Podium
- First: (United States) (United States) Ryan Hunter-Reay (Andretti Autosport)
- Second: (Australia) (Australia) Will Power (Team Penske)
- Third: (United Arab Emirates) (United Arab Emirates) Ed Jones (Chip Ganassi Racing)

The Chevrolet Detroit Grand Prix presented by Lear Corporation was the lone doubleheader event of the 2018 IndyCar Series season, consisting of the 7th and 8th rounds of the championship. The event was held at The Raceway at Belle Isle in Detroit, Michigan. Scott Dixon won Race 1, and Ryan Hunter-Reay won the Sunday race.

This event also marked the final IndyCar Series broadcast for ABC, ending a half-century stint covering the series (and its predecessors), as starting in 2019, NBC Sports was the series' only broadcaster. This would ultimately mark the end of Scott Goodyear's commentary career after 17 seasons with ESPN.

== Race 1 – Saturday, June 2 ==
=== Results ===
Icon	Meaning
R	Rookie
W	Past winner
W1	Past winner of race 1 in doubleheader
W2	Past winner of race 2 in doubleheader

==== Qualifying ====
Pos	No.	Name	Group	Time
1	98	(United States) Marco Andretti	2	1:14.8514
2	9	(New Zealand) Scott Dixon W	1	1:15.4186
3	6	(Canada) Robert Wickens R	2	1:15.3267
4	27	(United States) Alexander Rossi	1	1:15.4946
5	28	(United States) Ryan Hunter-Reay	2	1:15.3351
6	12	(Australia) Will Power W1 W2	1	1:15.7210
7	30	(Japan) Takuma Sato	2	1:15.3920
8	15	(United States) Graham Rahal W1 W2	1	1:15.8273
9	5	(Canada) James Hinchcliffe	2	1:15.5402
10	59	(United Kingdom) Max Chilton	1	1:16.0396
11	10	(United Arab Emirates) Ed Jones	2	1:15.8876
12	21	(United States) Spencer Pigot	1	1:16.1430
13	22	(France) Simon Pagenaud W2	2	1:16.0099
14	1	(United States) Josef Newgarden	1	1:16.1923
15	10	(Brazil) Tony Kanaan W	2	1:16.0740
16	26	(United States) Zach Veach R	1	1:16.3157
17	18	(France) Sébastien Bourdais W2	2	1:16.2205
18	19	(United States) Santino Ferrucci R	1	1:15.8343
19	88	(Colombia) Gabby Chaves	2	1:16.7531
20	20	(United Kingdom) Jordan King R	1	1:16.9075
21	4	(Brazil) Matheus Leist R	2	1:16.4182
22	23	(United States) Charlie Kimball	1	1:17.2067
23	32	(Austria) René Binder R	2	1:18.6108
OFFICIAL BOX SCORE

==== Race ====
Pos	No.	Driver	Team	Engine	Laps	Time/Retired	Pit Stops	Grid	Laps Led	Pts.^{1}
1	9	(New Zealand) Scott Dixon W	Chip Ganassi Racing	Honda	70	1:39:24.6189	2	2	39	54
2	28	(United States) Ryan Hunter-Reay	Andretti Autosport	Honda	70	+1.8249	3	5	7	41
3	27	(United States) Alexander Rossi	Andretti Autosport	Honda	70	+4.1771	2	4		35
4	98	(United States) Marco Andretti	Andretti Herta Autosport with Curb-Agajanian	Honda	70	+11.5191	2	1	22	34
5	30	(Japan) Takuma Sato	Rahal Letterman Lanigan Racing	Honda	70	+11.8757	2	7		30
6	10	(United Arab Emirates) Ed Jones	Chip Ganassi Racing	Honda	70	+13.7649	2	11		28
7	12	(Australia) Will Power W1 W2	Team Penske	Chevrolet	70	+15.0733	2	6		26
8	6	(Canada) Robert Wickens R	Schmidt Peterson Motorsports	Honda	70	+21.4715	3	3		24
9	1	(United States) Josef Newgarden	Team Penske	Chevrolet	70	+21.5622	3	14		22
10	21	(United States) Spencer Pigot	Ed Carpenter Racing	Chevrolet	70	+21.9523	2	12		20
11	5	(Canada) James Hinchcliffe	Schmidt Peterson Motorsports	Honda	70	+22.3158	4	9		19
12	26	(United States) Zach Veach R	Andretti Autosport	Honda	70	+23.0621	2	16		18
13	18	(France) Sébastien Bourdais W2	Dale Coyne Racing with Vasser-Sullivan	Honda	70	+23.3441	2	17		17
14	14	(Brazil) Tony Kanaan W	A. J. Foyt Enterprises	Chevrolet	70	+26.1877	3	15		16
15	4	(Brazil) Matheus Leist R	A. J. Foyt Enterprises	Chevrolet	70	+26.5471	3	21		15
16	20	(United Kingdom) Jordan King R	Ed Carpenter Racing	Chevrolet	70	+27.0156	3	20		14
17	22	(France) Simon Pagenaud W2	Team Penske	Chevrolet	70	+29.8038	3	13		13
18	88	(Colombia) Gabby Chaves	Harding Racing	Chevrolet	70	+33.7246	3	19		12
19	23	(United States) Charlie Kimball	Carlin	Chevrolet	70	+34.0911	3	22		11
20	59	(United Kingdom) Max Chilton	Carlin	Chevrolet	70	+34.8584	3	10		10
21	32	(Austria) René Binder R	Juncos Racing	Chevrolet	67	+3 laps	2	23		9
22	19	(United States) Santino Ferrucci R	Dale Coyne Racing	Honda	55	Contact	2	18		8
23	15	(United States) Graham Rahal W1 W2	Rahal Letterman Lanigan Racing	Honda	45	Crash	2	8	2	8
OFFICIAL BOX SCORE

Notes: ^{1} Points include 1 point for leading at least 1 lap during a race, an additional 2 points for leading the most race laps. For Detroit only, 1 bonus point was awarded to the fastest qualifier from both groups.

=== Championship standings after Race 1 ===
Drivers' Championship standings

	Pos	Driver	Points
1	1	(United States) Alexander Rossi	276
2	2	(New Zealand) Scott Dixon	272
2	3	(Australia) Will Power	269
1	4	(United States) Josef Newgarden	255
	5	(United States) Ryan Hunter-Reay	227

Manufacturer standings

Pos	Manufacturer	Points
1	(Japan) Honda	577
2	(United States) Chevrolet	497

- Note: Only the top five positions are included.

== Race 2 – Sunday, June 3 ==
=== Results ===
Icon	Meaning
R	Rookie
W	Past winner
W1	Past winner of race 1 in doubleheader
W2	Past winner of race 2 in doubleheader

==== Qualifying ====
Pos	No.	Name	Group	Time
1	27	(United States) Alexander Rossi	1	1:33.3143
2	6	(Canada) Robert Wickens R	2	1:33.6605
3	12	(Australia) Will Power W1 W2	1	1:33.8295
4	10	(United Arab Emirates) Ed Jones	2	1:33.9256
5	9	(New Zealand) Scott Dixon W W1	1	1:33.9544
6	5	(Canada) James Hinchcliffe	2	1:34.1370
7	26	(United States) Zach Veach R	1	1:34.6464
8	22	(France) Simon Pagenaud W2	2	1:34.2315
9	15	(United States) Graham Rahal W1 W2	1	1:35.0256
10	28	(United States) Ryan Hunter-Reay	2	1:34.5021
11	20	(United Kingdom) Jordan King R	1	1:35.1374
12	98	(United States) Marco Andretti	2	1:34.5475
13	19	(United States) Santino Ferrucci R	1	1:35.4664
14	88	(Colombia) Gabby Chaves	2	1:35.6045
15	21	(United States) Spencer Pigot	1	1:36.3713
16	18	(France) Sébastien Bourdais W2	2	1:35.6692
17	59	(United Kingdom) Max Chilton	1	1:36.9796
18	4	(Brazil) Matheus Leist R	2	1:36.0439
19	1	(United States) Josef Newgarden	1	1:38.3041
20	30	(Japan) Takuma Sato	2	1:37.0851
21	23	(United States) Charlie Kimball	1	1:39.3597
22	10	(Brazil) Tony Kanaan W	2	No time
23	32	(Austria) René Binder R	2	No time
OFFICIAL BOX SCORE

==== Race ====
Pos	No.	Driver	Team	Engine	Laps	Time/Retired	Pit Stops	Grid	Laps Led	Pts.^{1}
1	28	(United States) Ryan Hunter-Reay	Andretti Autosport	Honda	70	1:33:50.5784	3	10	18	51
2	12	(Australia) Will Power W1 W2	Team Penske	Chevrolet	70	+11.3549	2	3		40
3	10	(United Arab Emirates) Ed Jones	Chip Ganassi Racing	Honda	70	+13.2291	2	4		35
4	9	(New Zealand) Scott Dixon W W1	Chip Ganassi Racing	Honda	70	+13.7652	2	5		32
5	15	(United States) Graham Rahal W1 W2	Rahal Letterman Lanigan Racing	Honda	70	+16.6280	2	9		30
6	6	(Canada) Robert Wickens R	Schmidt Peterson Motorsports	Honda	70	+34.9398	3	2	6	30
7	14	(Brazil) Tony Kanaan W	A. J. Foyt Enterprises	Chevrolet	70	+41.6328	1	22		26
8	23	(United States) Charlie Kimball	Carlin	Chevrolet	70	+47.3553	2	21		24
9	98	(United States) Marco Andretti	Andretti Herta Autosport with Curb-Agajanian	Honda	70	+56.6293	3	12		22
10	22	(France) Simon Pagenaud W2	Team Penske	Chevrolet	70	+59.5891	2	8		20
11	59	(United Kingdom) Max Chilton	Carlin	Chevrolet	70	+1:04.6868	2	17		19
12	27	(United States) Alexander Rossi	Andretti Autosport	Honda	70	+1:06.6419	3	1	46	22
13	26	(United States) Zach Veach R	Andretti Autosport	Honda	70	+1:07.6438	1	7		17
14	4	(Brazil) Matheus Leist R	A. J. Foyt Enterprises	Chevrolet	70	+1:11.6742	2	18		16
15	1	(United States) Josef Newgarden	Team Penske	Chevrolet	70	+1:14.2820	2	19		15
16	5	(Canada) James Hinchcliffe	Schmidt Peterson Motorsports	Honda	70	+1:17.3729	3	6		14
17	30	(Japan) Takuma Sato	Rahal Letterman Lanigan Racing	Honda	69	+1 lap	2	20		13
18	20	(United Kingdom) Jordan King R	Ed Carpenter Racing	Chevrolet	69	+1 lap	1	11		12
19	88	(Colombia) Gabby Chaves	Harding Racing	Chevrolet	69	+1 lap	2	14		11
20	19	(United States) Santino Ferrucci R	Dale Coyne Racing	Honda	69	+1 lap	3	13		10
21	18	(France) Sébastien Bourdais W2	Dale Coyne Racing with Vasser-Sullivan	Honda	67	+3 laps	4	16		9
22	32	(Austria) René Binder R	Juncos Racing	Chevrolet	66	+4 laps	2	23		8
23	21	(United States) Spencer Pigot	Ed Carpenter Racing	Chevrolet	21	Mechanical	2	15		7
OFFICIAL BOX SCORE

Notes: ^{1} Points include 1 point for leading at least 1 lap during a race, an additional 2 points for leading the most race laps. For Detroit only, 1 bonus point was awarded to the fastest qualifier from both groups.

=== Championship standings after Race 2 ===
Drivers' Championship standings

	Pos	Driver	Points
2	1	(Australia) Will Power	309
	2	(New Zealand) Scott Dixon	304
2	3	(United States) Alexander Rossi	298
1	4	(United States) Ryan Hunter-Reay	278
1	5	(United States) Josef Newgarden	270

Manufacturer standings

Pos	Manufacturer	Points
1	(Japan) Honda	668
2	(United States) Chevrolet	563

- Note: Only the top five positions are included.

=== Pace car incident ===
During the opening pace laps of Race #2, the 2019 Chevrolet Corvette ZR1 pace car leading the field and being driven by General Motors executive Mark Reuss lost control and crashed head-on into the left-hand retaining wall coming out of the exit of turn two of the track, shortly after leaving pit road. Neither Reuss nor Mark Sandy, an IndyCar official who was a passenger in the car, were injured in the crash and were able to exit the vehicle after the crash. Because the race cars had just left pit road and were being led by the pace car, all of the drivers in the race, except for Alexander Rossi, stopped on the track behind the wrecked car as safety crews and track workers cleaned up debris from the accident and removed the damaged vehicle. Rossi, who was to start the race from the pole position and was directly behind the pace car when the incident occurred, was the only driver to drive past the crash and returned to pit road afterwards. Approximately 20 minutes after the crash, the cars still on the track had their engines re-fired and were directed to drive to pit road in order to reset the starting grid for the race start. An identical back-up pace car of the same make and model was brought out to pace the field, this time driven by former IndyCar driver and official Oriol Servià who regularly drove the pace car during caution periods. The incident delayed the start of the race by over 30 minutes from its scheduled start time of 3:50pm local time. The race eventually went green sometime past 4:20pm.

An official statement from General Motors, of which Chevrolet is a division of, read in part, "It is unfortunate that this incident happened. Many factors contributed, including weather and track conditions. The car’s safety systems performed as expected." Reuss, who had previous experience driving high powered cars in his tenure at General Motors, posted his own statement onto his Facebook page apologizing for the mishap: "I have driven this course many many many times. I have paced this race in the wet, cold, hot, and calm. On Z06’s, Grand Sports, and other things. It is never a casual thing for me, but an honor to be asked. Today I let down my friends, my family, IndyCar, our city and my company. Sorry does not describe it. I want to thank our engineers for providing me the safety I know is the best in the world." IndyCar drivers Will Power and eventual race winner Ryan Hunter-Reay were sympathetic to Reuss in their comments on the incident following the race, with Power saying, "I felt really bad for whoever was in the pace car. It's very easy to do, and the traction control must have been turned off. Wasn't really his fault."

The unusual incident garnered massive amounts of attention on social media and news outlets, with Adam Stern of Sports Business Journal tweeting that the exposure that the crash gave to Chevrolet was " more than 70 times" worth the exposure Chevrolet earned from the race itself. The incident was briefly mentioned by television presenter Jeremy Clarkson in series 3, episode 8 of the Amazon Prime Video motoring show The Grand Tour while Clarkson was test driving a Corvette similar to the one Reuss had crashed. Nearly one year after the crash, Reuss was given the opportunity to drive the pace car for the opening laps of the 2019 edition of the race, this time doing so without incident.

Previous race: 2018 Indianapolis 500	IndyCar Series; 2018 season	Next race: 2018 DXC Technology 600
Previous race: 2017 Chevrolet Detroit Grand Prix	Chevrolet Detroit Grand Prix	Next race: 2019 Chevrolet Detroit Grand Prix
