= Alexandra Mohnhaupt =

Mexican racing driver (born 1999)

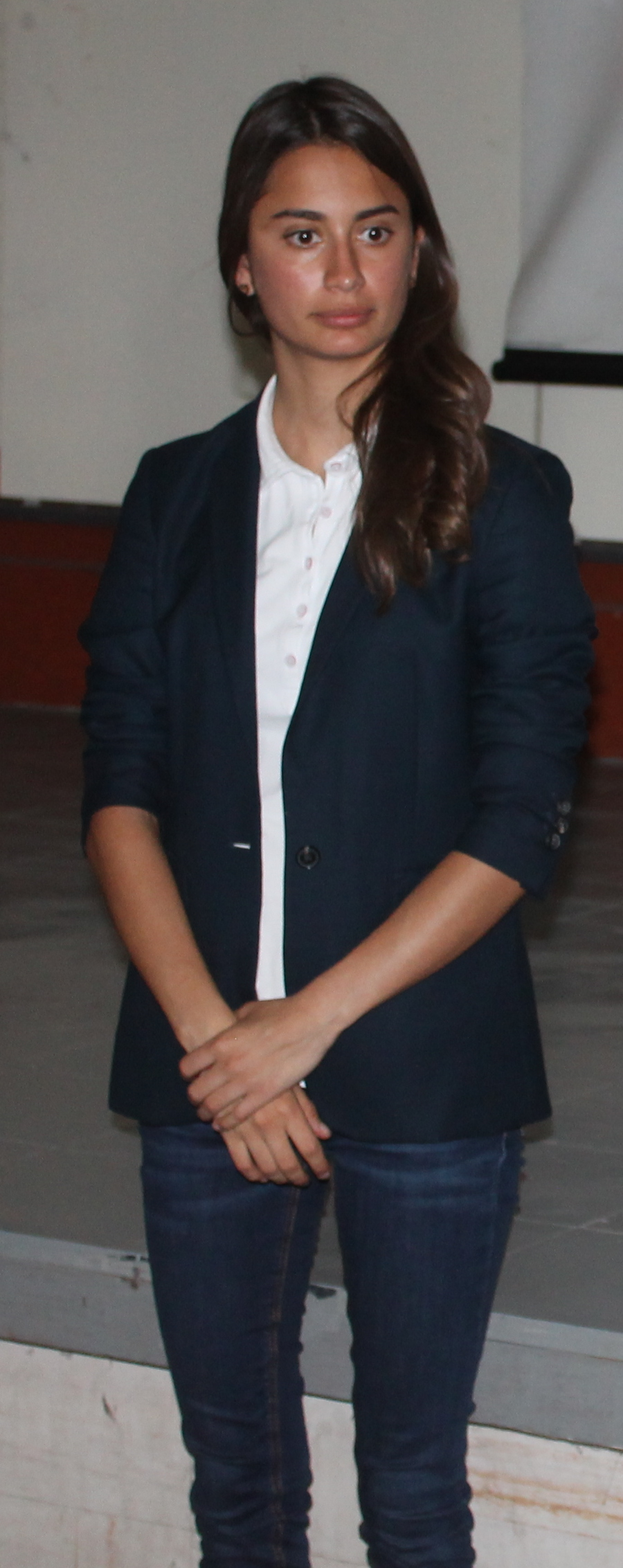
- Mohnhaupt in 2018
- Nationality: Mexican
- Born: 25 November 1999 (age 26) Puebla, Mexico

NACAM Formula 4 Championship career
- Debut season: 2015–16
- Current team: Ram Racing
- Car number: 5
- Former teams: MomoF4
- Starts: 65
- Championships: 0
- Wins: 2
- Podiums: 11
- Poles: 0
- Fastest laps: 0
- Best finish: 5th in 2017–18

Previous series
- 2016–2017: F4 British Championship

Alexandra Mohnhaupt Quintana (born 25 November 1999 in Puebla) is a Mexican racing driver of German descent.

== Biography ==
=== Motorsport career ===
A multiple Mexican karting champion, Mohnhaupt began racing in the NACAM Formula 4 Championship in 2015. In her third season in the category, she became the first female driver to win a Formula 4 race at the Autódromo Miguel E. Abed in February 2018. Having contested a handful of rounds in British F4, Mohnhaupt joined Douglas Motorsport for the 2018 BRDC British Formula 3 Championship alongside Jamie Chadwick, but she broke her back and ribs in a pre-season testing crash at Spa-Francorchamps. Mohnhaupt announced her retirement from the sport after the incident, citing mental health issues.

Mohnhaupt returned to racing in 2023 in the NACAM Formula 4 Championship, running a part-time schedule that resulted in two podiums on her return event. She made her first stock car appearance in 2024, contesting the penultimate round of the NASCAR Mexico Truck Series at the Autodromo Miguel E. Abed.

== Personal life ==
Mohnhaupt's father Torsten is German and immigrated to Mexico in his youth to work in the automotive industry. She is trilingual in Spanish, German and English. Between her racing stints, she studied International Management at Geneva Business School. Mohnhaupt was named Puebla's Citizen of the Year in 2018.

Mohnhaupt is in a relationship with Brazilian touring car driver Luis Goulart.

== Racing record ==
=== Career summary ===
Season	Series	Team	Races	Wins	Poles	F/Laps	Podiums	Points	Position
2015–16	NACAM Formula 4 Championship	MomoF4	21	0	0	0	0	57	13th
2016	F4 British Championship	Falcon Motorsport	6	0	0	0	0	0	21st
2016–17	NACAM Formula 4 Championship	MomoF4 Team	23	0	0	0	1	141	7th
2017	F4 British Championship	Fortec Motorsports	3	0	0	0	0	0	24th
2017–18	NACAM Formula 4 Championship	MomoF4 Team	13	2	0	0	8	183	5th
2023	NACAM Formula 4 Championship	Ram Racing	6	0	0	0	2	70	9th
2023	NACAM Formula 4 Championship	HRI Mexico	2	0	0	0	0	70	9th
2024	NASCAR Mexico Truck Series	Aranda Racing Team	1	0	0	0	0	?	?

=== Complete NACAM Formula 4 Championship results ===
(key) (Races in bold indicate pole position; races in italics indicate fastest lap)

Year	Team	1	2	3	4	5	6	7	8	9	10	11	12	13	14	15	16	17	18	19	20	21	22	23	DC	Points
2015–16	MomoF4	PUE1; 1; 15	PUE1; 2; 11	PUE1; 3; 14	AGS; 1; 11	AGS; 2; 10	AGS; 3; 9	SLP; 1; 11	SLP; 2; 7	SLP; 3; 8	EDM; 1; 9	EDM; 2; 6	EDM; 3; 6	PUE2; 1; 9	PUE2; 2; 9	PUE2; 3; 10	MTY; 1; 12	MTY; 2; 8	MTY; 3; 8	CMX; 1; 11	CMX; 2; 11	CMX; 3; 11			13th	57
2016–17	MomoF4	AUS; 1; 8	AUS; 2; 7	AUS; 3; 8	CMX1; 1; 6	CMX1; 2 Ret	PUE; 1; 8	PUE; 2; 7	PUE; 3 Ret	YUC; 1 Ret	YUC; 2; 9	YUC; 3; 5	CAN; 1; 8	CAN; 2; 6	CAN; 3; 7	MTY; 1; 9	MTY; 2; 4	MTY; 3; 7	SLP; 1; 6	SLP; 2; 5	SLP; 3; 5	CMX2; 1; 6	CMX2; 2; 3	CMX2; 3; 7	7th	141
2017–18	MomoF4	CMX1; 1; 3	CMX1; 2; 2	CMX2; 1; 2	CMX2; 2 Ret	EDM; 1; 2	EDM; 2; 3	EDM; 3; 8	PUE; 1; 1	PUE; 2; 1	PUE; 3; 6	AGS; 1; 3	AGS; 2; 5	AGS; 3; 4	YUC; 1	YUC; 2	YUC; 3	MTY; 1	MTY; 2	MTY; 3	CMX3; 1	CMX3; 2	CMX3; 3		5th	183
2023	Ram Racing	CMX1; 1; 3	CMX1; 2 Ret	CMX1; 3; 3	QUE1; 1; 5	QUE1; 2; 6	QUE1; 3; 6	CMX2; 1	CMX2; 2	CMX2; 3	CMX3; 1	CMX3; 2	CMX3; 3	QUE2; 1	QUE2; 2	QUE2; 3	PUE; 1	PUE; 2	PUE; 3						9th	70
2023	HRI Mexico																			CMX4; 1; 7	CMX4; 2; 6				9th	70

=== Complete F4 British Championship results ===
(key) (Races in bold indicate pole position; races in italics indicate fastest lap)

Year	Team	1	2	3	4	5	6	7	8	9	10	11	12	13	14	15	16	17	18	19	20	21	22	23	24	25	26	27	28	29	30	DC	Points
2016	Falcon Motorsport	BHI; 1	BHI; 2	BHI; 3	DON; 1	DON; 2	DON; 3	THR; 1	THR; 2	THR; 3	OUL; 1	OUL; 2	OUL; 3	CRO; 1	CRO; 2	CRO; 3	SNE; 1; 16	SNE; 2; 15	SNE; 3; 17	KNO; 1; 11	KNO; 2; 12	KNO; 3; 15	ROC; 1	ROC; 2	ROC; 3	SIL; 1	SIL; 2	SIL; 3	BHGP; 1	BHGP; 2	BHGP; 3	21st	0
2017	Fortec Motorsports	BHI; 1	BHI; 2	BHI; 3	DON; 1	DON; 2	DON; 3	THR; 1	THR; 2	THR; 3	OUL; 1	OUL; 2	OUL; 3	CRO; 1	CRO; 2	CRO; 3	SNE; 1; 15	SNE; 1; 15	SNE; 1; 15	KNO; 1	KNO; 2	KNO; 3	ROC; 1	ROC; 2	ROC; 3	SIL; 1	SIL; 2	SIL; 3	BHGP; 1	BHGP; 2	BHGP; 3	24th	0
