= Hugo Becerra Jr. =

Mexican race car driver (born 1996)

Hugo Becerra Monterrey (born September 18, 1996) is a Mexican race car driver.

== Career ==
Becerra began his racing career in karting at age of 12 (2009). He remained in karting until 2011, when he migrated to endurance racing competing in Turismos de Resistencia or "Touring Endurance Championship" in 2011 and 2012 with a Mini Challenge car, he participated in GT Racing in the Porsche GT3 Cup Mexico in 2013 and later on competed in open-wheel racing, in Formula Ford, Formula Panam, Panam F3 and FIA F4 NACAM Championship. Becerra later joined the Martiga EG team in 2015, racing alongside Luis Alfonso Pérez and Alexis Carreño.

== Racing record ==
Career Summary

Season	Series	Team	races	wins	poles	F/laps	Podiums	Points	Position
2010	Formula A Jr	N/A	11	9	8	8	10	Pending	1st
2011	MRF-1	N/A	10	0	2	0	0	Pending	3rd
2011	Turismos de resistencia	Prendamex Autoforum Volkswagen	3	0	0	0	0	Pending	8th
2012	Turismos de resistencia	MINI Prendamex	7	2	0	2	5	Pending	3rd
2013	Porsche GT3 Cup	DTT Mexico	2	0	0	0	2	Pending	Pending
2013	Formula Panam	DTT Mexico	4	0	2	0	0	Pending	Pending
2015-2016	FIA F4 NACAM Championship	MartigaEG	6	0	0	0	0	53	9th
2018	NASCAR Mikel Trucks	Escuderia Grupo Top	2	0	0	0	1		
2019	NASCAR Mikel Trucks	Escuderia Grupo Top	3	1	0	0	1		

=== Complete NACAM Formula 4 Championship results ===
(key) (Races in bold indicate pole position; races in italics indicate fastest lap)

Year	Team	1	2	3	4	5	6	7	8	9	10	11	12	13	14	15	16	17	18	19	20	21	DC	Points
2015-16	Martiga EG	PUE1; 1; 4	PUE1; 2; 5	PUE1; 3; 5	AGS; 1; 14	AGS; 2; 6	AGS; 3; 4	SLP; 1	SLP; 2	SLP; 3	EDM; 1	EDM; 2	EDM; 3	PUE2; 1	PUE2; 2	PUE2; 3	MTY; 1	MTY; 2	MTY; 3	MEX; 1; 9	MEX; 2 Ret	MEX; 3 DNS	14th	55
