= Moisés de la Vara =

Mexican racing driver (born 1997)

- Nationality: (Mexico) Mexican
- Born: August 13, 1997 (age 29) Guadalajara, Mexico

Indy Pro 2000 career
- Debut season: 2016
- Current team: DEForce Racing
- Car number: 6
- Starts: 38
- Wins: 0
- Poles: 0
- Fastest laps: 0
- Best finish: 8th in 2019

Previous series
- 2015–16 2016 2016–17 2017 2017 2017–18: NACAM Formula 4 Championship; F4 USA Championship; NACAM Formula 4 Championship; F4 USA Championship; U.S. F2000 National Championship; NACAM Formula 4 Championship

Championship titles
- 2017–18: NACAM Formula 4 Championship

Moisés de la Vara (born August 13, 1997) is a Mexican racing driver. He most recently competed in the 2020 Indy Pro 2000 Championship with DEForce Racing. de la Vara is the 2017–18 NACAM Formula 4 Championship Champion.

== Career ==
=== Karting ===
De la Vara began karting in 2014. He participated in multiple championships in the United States including the Rotax Max US Open, the Rotax Max Challenge Grand National and the Rotax Max Pro-Kart Challenge.

=== Formula 4 ===
In 2015, de la Vara made his single-seater debut in the 2015–16 NACAM Formula 4 Championship with MomoF4. He managed to take his maiden win at Parque Tangamanga and finished the season in eighth. In 2016, he joined Leading Edge Grand Prix to compete in the Formula 4 United States Championship. He took his only podium of the season at the Mid-Ohio Sports Car Course and finished the season in seventh.

De la Vara remained with MomoF4 in the opening round of the 2016–17 NACAM Formula 4 Championship but switched to Scuderia Martiga EG ahead of round 2. With Martiga EG Racing, he scored three wins and finished fourth in the championship. In 2017, he also joined DEForce Racing, for whom he also competed in the U.S. F2000 National Championship, for two rounds in the Formula 4 United States Championship.

De la Vara remained with Scuderia Martiga EG for the 2017–18 NACAM Formula 4 Championship. He went on to take the championship title ahead of Igor Fraga, following a triple-win at Autódromo Monterrey and six previous wins throughout the season.

=== Indy Pro 2000 ===
In 2016, de la Vara joined the newly founded DEForce Racing for the Pro Mazda Championship season finale at Laguna Seca, where he achieved one national class win. He rejoined the team during the 2018 Pro Mazda Championship. In 2019, he remained with the team to contest the full Indy Pro 2000 Championship. He finished the season in eighth after taking a best race finish of fourth. He remained with DEForce Racing once again to compete in the 2020 Indy Pro 2000 Championship but this he came only 12th in the championship standings.

== Racing record ==
=== Career summary ===
Season	Series	Team	Races	Wins	Poles	F/Laps	Podiums	Points	Position
2015-16	NACAM Formula 4 Championship	MomoF4	22	1	0	0	1	100	8th
2016	Pro Mazda Championship - National	DEForce Racing	3	1	0	0	2	52	5th
2016	Formula 4 United States Championship	Leading Edge Grand Prix	15	0	0	0	1	71	7th
2016-17	NACAM Formula 4 Championship	MomoF4	3	0	0	0	0	248	4th
2016-17	NACAM Formula 4 Championship	Scuderia Martiga EG	18	3	2	2	7	248	4th
2017	Formula 4 United States Championship	DEForce Racing	6	0	0	0	0	0	44th
2017	U.S. F2000 National Championship	DEForce Racing	12	0	0	0	0	98	12th
2017-18	NACAM Formula 4 Championship	Scuderia Martiga EG	22	9	4	9	16	386	**1st**
2018	Pro Mazda Championship	DEForce Racing	5	0	0	0	0	75	15th
2019	Indy Pro 2000 Championship	DEForce Racing	16	0	0	0	0	198	8th
2020	Indy Pro 2000 Championship	DEForce Racing	14	0	0	0	0	163	12th

=== Complete NACAM Formula 4 Championship results ===
(key) (Races in bold indicate pole position; races in italics indicate fastest lap)

Year	Team	1	2	3	4	5	6	7	8	9	10	11	12	13	14	15	16	17	18	19	20	21	DC	Points
2015-16	MomoF4	PUE1; 1; 10	PUE1; 2; 7	PUE1; 3 Ret	AGS; 1; 6	AGS; 2; 12	AGS; 3; 10	SLP; 1; 8	SLP; 2; 1	SLP; 3 Ret	EDM; 1; 6	EDM; 2; 5	EDM; 3; 4	PUE2; 1; 7	PUE2; 2; 11	PUE2; 3; 8	MTY; 1; 9	MTY; 2; 7	MTY; 3; 9	MEX; 1; 10	MEX; 2; 9	MEX; 3 Ret	8th	100
