= Manuel Sulaimán =

Mexican racing driver (born 2000)

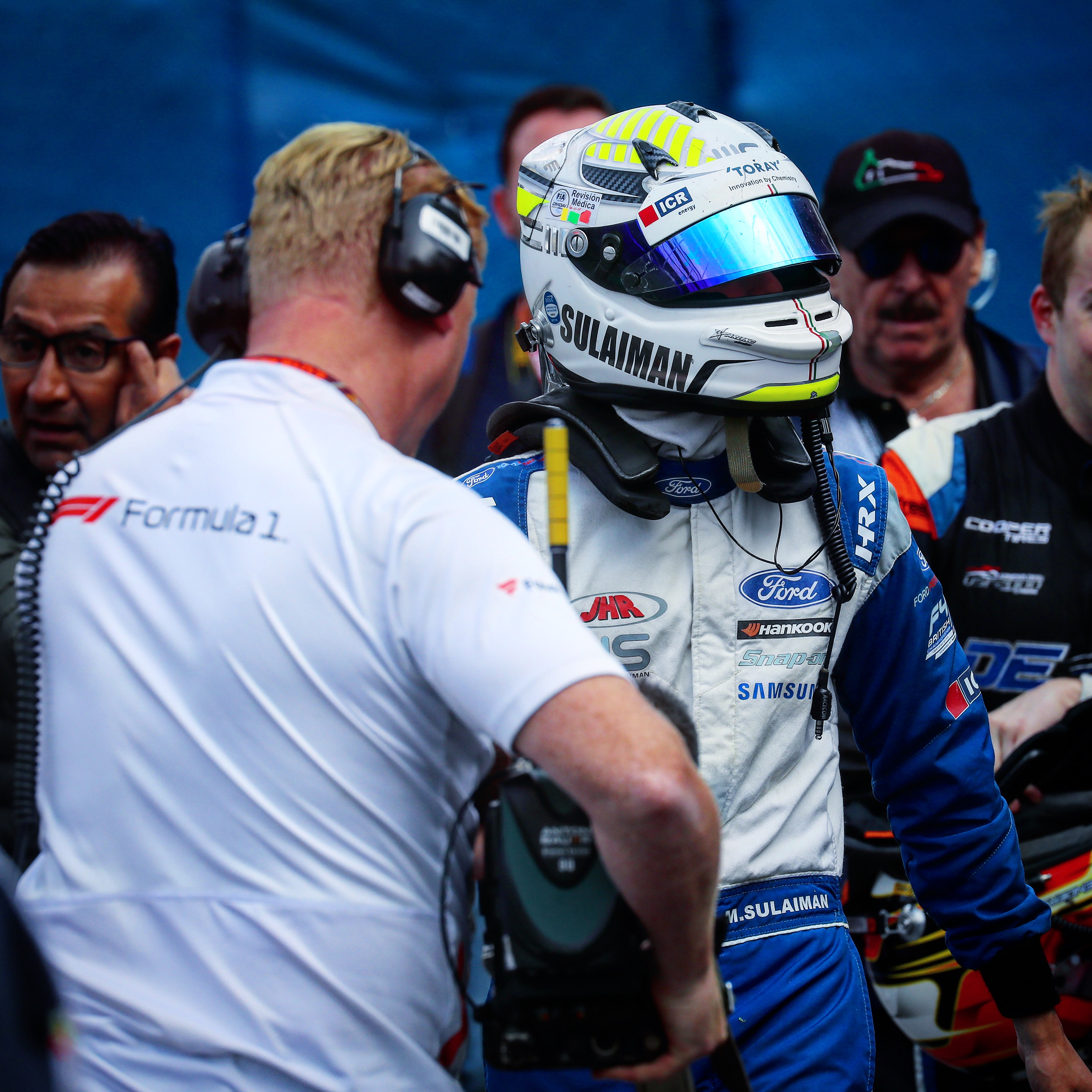
- Nationality: (Mexico) Mexican
- Born: Jesús Manuel Sulaimán Graña; 20 July 2000 (age 26) Mexico City, Mexico

Indy Lights career
- Current team: HMD Motorsports
- Car number: 59

Previous series
- 2016-17 2017 2018 2018-19 2019 2021: NACAM Formula 4 Championship; Formula 4 British Championship; Formula 4 British Championship; NACAM Formula 4 Championship; U.S. F2000 National Championship; Indy Pro 2000 Championship

Championship titles
- 2018-19: NACAM Formula 4 Championship

Jesús Manuel Sulaimán Graña (born 20 July 2000) is a Mexican racing driver who most recently raced in the 2022 Indy Lights for HMD Motorsports.

== Racing career ==
Sulaimán started the 2021 Indy Pro 2000 Championship with Juncos Hollinger Racing, winning one race. He left the team mid-season and joined HMD Motorsports in the 2021 Indy Lights series for Portland.

== Racing record ==
=== Career summary ===
Season	Series	Team	Races	Wins	Poles	F/Laps	Podiums	Points	Position
2016-17	NACAM Formula 4 Championship	Ram Racing	15	0	0	0	3	151	6th
2017	F4 British Championship	JHR Developments	21	0	0	0	1	43	13th
2018	F4 British Championship	JHR Developments	30	0	0	0	0	94	9th
2018-19	NACAM Formula 4 Championship	Ram Racing	20	10	4	4	15	366	**1st**
2019	U.S. F2000 National Championship	DEForce Racing	15	0	0	0	2	211	6th
2020	Indy Pro 2000 Championship	DEForce Racing	17	2	3	4	4	289	6th
2021	Indy Pro 2000 Championship	Juncos Hollinger Racing	13	1	2	0	3	214	9th
2021	Indy Lights	HMD Motorsports	6	0	0	0	0	75	15th
2022	Indy Lights	HMD Motorsports with Dale Coyne Racing	2	0	0	0	0	48	16th

*Season still in progress.

=== Complete NACAM Formula 4 Championship results ===
(key) (Races in bold indicate pole position; races in italics indicate fastest lap)

Year	Team	1	2	3	4	5	6	7	8	9	10	11	12	13	14	15	16	17	18	19	20	21	22	23	DC	Points
2016-17	Ram Racing	COTA; 1; 10	COTA; 2; 5	COTA; 3; 5	AHR1; 1	AHR1; 2	PUE; 1; 6	PUE; 2; 2	PUE; 3; 4	MER; 1; 2	MER; 2; 6	MER; 3 Ret	CAN; 1; 4	CAN; 2; 5	CAN; 3; 5	MTY; 1; 2	MTY; 2; 8	MTY; 3; 4	SLP; 1	SLP; 2	SLP; 3	AHR2; 1	AHR2; 2	AHR2; 3	6th	151
2018-19	Ram Racing	AHR1; 1; 1	AHR1; 2; 2	**PUE**; **1**; 1	PUE; 2 Ret	**PUE**; **3**; 1	**SLP**; **1**; 1	SLP; 2; 4	**SLP**; **3** Ret	**MTY**; **1**; 1	MTY; 2; 1	**MTY**; **3**; 1	**AGS**; **1**; 1	AGS; 2; 2	**AGS**; **3**; 1	PUE; 1; 2	PUE; 2; 8	PUE; 3; 2	AHR2; 1; 2	AHR2; 2; 5	AHR2; 3; 1				1st	366

=== Complete F4 British Championship results ===
(key) (Races in bold indicate pole position; races in italics indicate fastest lap)

Year	Team	1	2	3	4	5	6	7	8	9	10	11	12	13	14	15	16	17	18	19	20	21	22	23	24	25	26	27	28	29	30	DC	Points
2017	JHR Developments	BHI; 1; 8	BHI; 2; 9	BHI; 3; 9	DON; 1; 13	DON; 2; 12	DON; 3 Ret	THR; 1	THR; 2	THR; 3	OUL; 1	OUL; 2	OUL; 3	CRO; 1	CRO; 2	CRO; 3	SNE; 1; 9	SNE; 2; 12	SNE; 3; 9	KNO; 1 EX	KNO; 2; 11	KNO; 3 Ret	ROC; 1 Ret	ROC; 2; 13	ROC; 3; 8	SIL; 1 Ret	SIL; 2; 10	SIL; 3; 10	BHGP; 1; 7	BHGP; 2; 3	BHGP; 3; 8	13th	43
2018	JHR Developments	BHI; 1; 8	BHI; 2; 12	BHI; 3 Ret	DON; 1; 10	DON; 2; 13	DON; 3 Ret	THR; 1 Ret	THR; 2; 4	THR; 3; 11	OUL; 1; 9	OUL; 2; 8	OUL; 3; 7	CRO; 1; 8	CRO; 2; 6	CRO; 3; 8	SNE; 1; 11	SNE; 2; 12	SNE; 3; 9	KNO; 1; 8	KNO; 2; 7	KNO; 3; 10	ROC; 1; 9	ROC; 2; 6	ROC; 3; 10	SIL; 1; 7	SIL; 2; 7	SIL; 3; 5	BHGP; 1 Ret	BHGP; 2; 9	BHGP; 3; 9	9th	95

=== American open–wheel racing results ===
==== U.S. F2000 National Championship ====
Year	Team	1	2	3	4	5	6	7	8	9	10	11	12	13	14	15	Rank	Points
2019	DEForce Racing	STP; 2	STP; 6	IMS; 3	IMS; 18	LOR; 9	ROA; 5	ROA; 16	TOR; 7	TOR; 4	MOH; 11	MOH; 8	POR; 7	POR; 7	LAG; 9	LAG; 11	6th	211

==== Indy Pro 2000 Championship ====
Year	Team	1	2	3	4	5	6	7	8	9	10	11	12	13	14	15	16	17	18	Rank	Points
2020	DEForce Racing	ROA; 16	**ROA**; 11	MOH; 4	MOH; 5	MOH; 6	**LOR**; 3	GMP; 7	IMS; DNS	IMS; 14	IMS; 4	MOH; 1*	**MOH**; 7	NJMP; 3	NJMP; 11	NJMP; 1*	STP; 5	STP; 10		6th	289
2021	Juncos Hollinger Racing	ALA; DSQ	ALA; 8	STP; 5	STP; 2	IMS; 9	IMS; 11	IMS; 8	IRP; 3	**ROA**; 1*	**ROA**; 7	MOH1; 12	MOH1; 7	GMP; 7	NJMP; Wth	NJMP; Wth	NJMP; Wth	MOH2	MOH2	9th	214

==== Indy Lights ====
Year	Team	1	2	3	4	5	6	7	8	9	10	11	12	13	14	15	16	17	18	19	20	Rank	Points
2021	HMD Motorsports	ALA	ALA	STP	STP	IMS	IMS	DET	DET	RDA	RDA	MOH	MOH	GTW	GTW	POR; 6	POR; 10	LAG; 7	LAG; 10	MOH; 7	MOH; 11	15th	75
2022	HMD Motorsports w/ Dale Coyne Racing	STP; 6	ALA; 10	IMS	IMS	DET	DET	RDA	MOH	IOW	NSH	GTW	POR	LAG	LAG							16th	48
