= Axel Matus =

Mexican racing driver

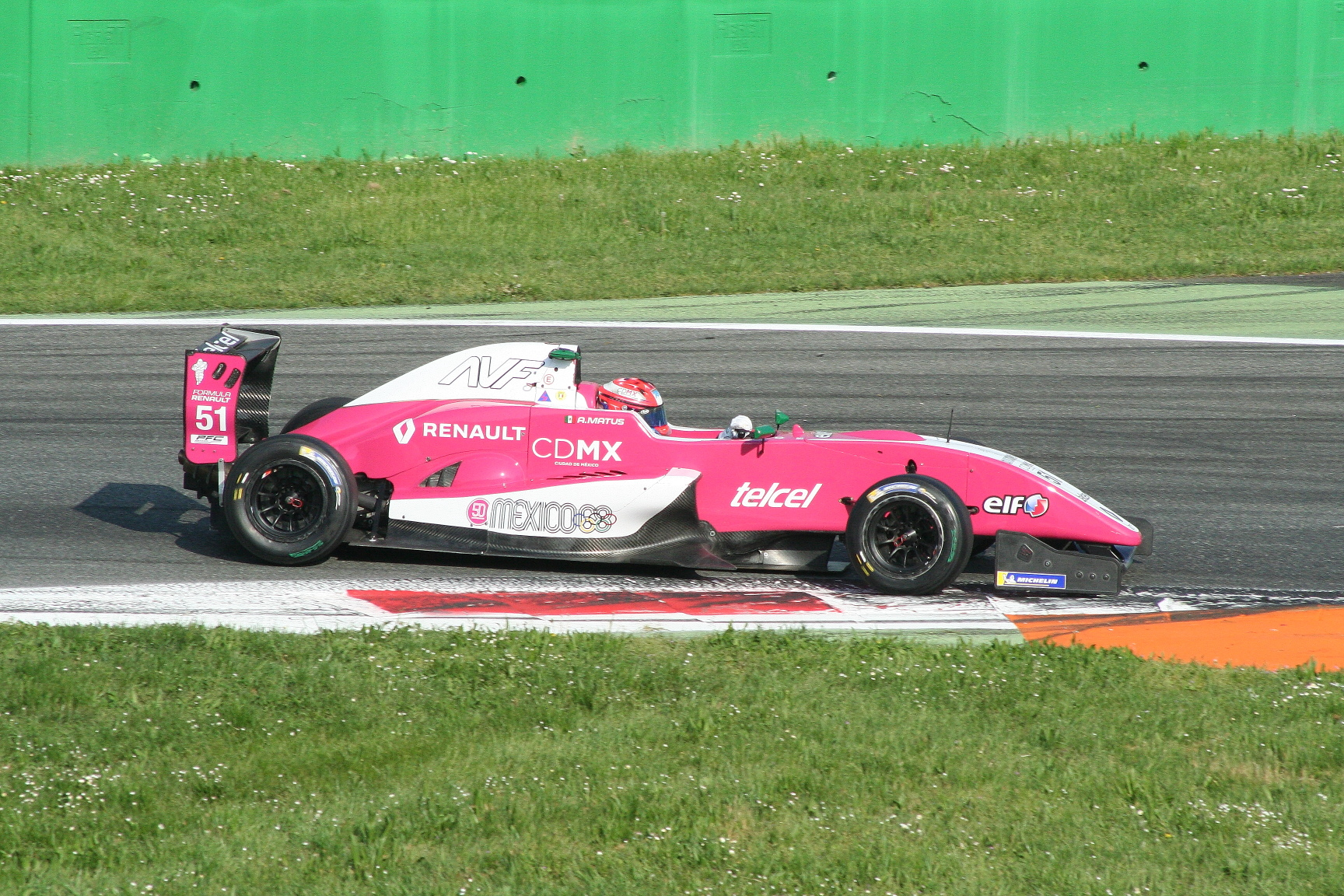
- Nationality: (Mexico) Mexican
- Born: 17 June 1998 (age 28) Guadalajara, Mexico

Formula Renault Eurocup career
- Debut season: 2017
- Current team: AVF by Adrián Vallés
- Car number: 51
- Starts: 43
- Wins: 0
- Poles: 0
- Fastest laps: 0
- Best finish: 19th in 2018

Previous series
- 2015-16 2015-16 2014-15: NACAM Formula 4 Championship; Formula Panam; French F4 Championship

Championship titles
- 2016 2015-16: NACAM Formula 4 Championship; Formula Panam

Axel Matus (born 17 June 1998 in Guadalajara) is a Mexican racing driver backed by Escuderia Telmex. He last competed in the NACAM Formula 4 Championship.

== Career ==
=== Karting ===
Matus first began karting in 2002, at the age of four. From 2007 onwards, he competed in major karting championships across Mexico and the United States.

=== Lower Formulae ===
In 2014, Matus made his debut in French F4, finishing twenty first in his debut season. He returned the following year, claimed his maiden victory and finished seventh overall. In October 2014, Matus was among four drivers invited to join the testing of the Ferrari Driver Academy, but was not included into it.

In 2015, Matus went on to become Formula Panam champion and the inaugural NACAM Formula 4 champion.

=== Formula Renault ===
In January 2017, Matus signed with AVF for the Eurocup Championship. He was just one from five drivers who were not able to secure a points-finishing position, ending the season 24th.

== Racing record ==
=== Career summary ===
Season	Series	Team	Races	Wins	Poles	F/Laps	Podiums	Points	Position
2014	French F4 Championship	Auto Sport Academy	21	0	0	0	0	1	21st
2015	French F4 Championship	Auto Sport Academy	21	1	1	1	4	123	7th
2015	Formula Panam	N/A	2	1	1	1	1	20	9th
2015-16	NACAM Formula 4 Championship	Ram Racing	21	12	6	9	16	405	**1st**
2016	Formula Panam	AIF/Apollo	8	3	3	?	8	129	**1st**
2017	Formula Renault Eurocup	AVF by Adrián Vallés	23	0	0	0	0	0	24th
2017	Formula Renault NEC	AVF by Adrián Vallés	3	0	0	0	0	0	NC†
2018	Formula Renault Eurocup	AVF by Adrián Vallés	20	0	0	0	0	4	19th
2018	Formula Renault NEC	AVF by Adrián Vallés	8	0	0	0	0	0	NC†
2025	NACAM Formula 4 Championship	Alessandros Blue	3	0	0	0	1	27	14th

^{†} As Matus was a guest driver, he was ineligible for points.

=== Complete French F4 Championship results ===
(key) (Races in bold indicate pole position) (Races in italics indicate points for the fastest lap of top ten finishers)

Year	1	2	3	4	5	6	7	8	9	10	11	12	13	14	15	16	17	18	19	20	21	Rank	Points
2014	LMS; 1; 19	LMS; 2; 15	LMS; 3; 18	PAU; 1; 12	PAU; 2; 15	PAU; 3; 15	VDV; 1; 17	VDV; 2; 16	VDV; 3; 16	MAG; 1; 18	MAG; 2; 14	MAG; 3; 17	NOG; 1; 18	NOG; 2; 15	NOG; 3; 17	JER; 1; 17	JER; 2; 18	JER; 3; 15	LEC; 1; 15	LEC; 2; 11	LEC; 3; 15	21st	1
2015	LÉD; 1; 3	LÉD; 2; 4	LÉD; 3; 5	LMS; 1; 3	LMS; 2; 9	**LMS**; **3**; 13	PAU; 1; 8	PAU; 2; 1	PAU; 3; 8	HUN; 1 Ret	HUN; 2; 10	HUN; 3; 13	MAG; 1; 7	MAG; 2; 8	MAG; 3; 12	NAV; 1 Ret	NAV; 2; 13	NAV; 3; 11	LEC; 1; 7	LEC; 2; 4	LEC; 3; 5	7th	125

=== Complete NACAM Formula 4 Championship results ===
(key) (Races in bold indicate pole position; races in italics indicate fastest lap)

Year	Team	1	2	3	4	5	6	7	8	9	10	11	12	13	14	15	16	17	18	19	20	21	DC	Points
2015-16	Ram Racing	**PUE1**; **1**; 1	PUE1; 2 Ret	**PUE1**; **3**; 1	**AGS**; **1**; 1	AGS; 2; 1	**AGS**; **3**; 1	**SLP**; **1**; 1	SLP; 2 Ret	**SLP**; **3**; 11	EDM; 1; 2	EDM; 2; 9	EDM; 3 DSQ	**PUE2**; **1**; 1	PUE2; 2; 3	**PUE2**; **3**; 1	**MTY**; **1**; 2	MTY; 2; 2	**MTY**; **3**; 1	MEX; 1; 1	MEX; 2; 1	MEX; 3; 1	1st	405
2025	Alessandros Blue	PUE1; 1; 4	PUE1; 2 Ret	PUE1; 3; 3	AHR1; 1	AHR1; 2	AHR1; 3	AHR2; 1	AHR2; 2	AHR2; 3	AHR3; 1	AHR3; 2	AHR3; 3	PUE2; 1	PUE2; 2	PUE2; 3	AHR4; 1	AHR4; 2					10th*	27*

=== Complete Formula Renault Eurocup results ===
(key) (Races in bold indicate pole position) (Races in italics indicate fastest lap)

Year	Team	1	2	3	4	5	6	7	8	9	10	11	12	13	14	15	16	17	18	19	20	21	22	23	Pos	Points
2017	AVF by Adrián Vallés	MNZ; 1; 26	MNZ; 2; 13	SIL; 1; 26	SIL; 2; 11	PAU; 1; 14	PAU; 2; 12	MON; 1; 24	MON; 2; 18	HUN; 1; 22	HUN; 2; 26	HUN; 3; 23	NÜR; 1; 19	NÜR; 2; 12	RBR; 1 Ret	RBR; 2 Ret	LEC; 1 Ret	LEC; 2; 15	SPA; 1; 17	SPA; 2; 14	SPA; 3; 19	CAT; 1; 14	CAT; 2; 14	CAT; 3; 21	24th	0
2018	AVF by Adrián Vallés	LEC; 1; 20	LEC; 2; 16	MNZ; 1 Ret	MNZ; 2 Ret	SIL; 1; 14	SIL; 2 Ret	MON; 1; 18	MON; 2 Ret	RBR; 1; 16	RBR; 2; 11	SPA; 1 Ret	SPA; 2; 26	HUN; 1; 8	HUN; 2; 15	NÜR; 1; 16	NÜR; 2 Ret	HOC; 1 Ret	HOC; 2; 14	CAT; 1 Ret	CAT; 2 Ret				19th	4

=== Complete Formula Renault NEC results ===
(key) (Races in bold indicate pole position) (Races in italics indicate fastest lap)

Year	Entrant	1	2	3	4	5	6	7	8	9	10	11	12	DC	Points
2017	AVF by Adrián Vallés	MNZ; 1	MNZ; 2	ASS; 1	ASS; 2	NÜR; 1	NÜR; 2	SPA; 1; 17	SPA; 2; 14	SPA; 3; 19	HOC; 1	HOC; 2		NC†	0
2018	AVF by Adrián Vallés	PAU; 1	PAU; 2	MNZ; 1	MNZ; 2	SPA; 1 Ret	SPA; 2; 26	HUN; 1; 8	HUN; 2; 15	NÜR; 1; 16	NÜR; 2 Ret	HOC; 1 Ret	HOC; 2; 14	NC†	0

† As Matus was a guest driver, he was ineligible for points
