= Lola T97/20 =

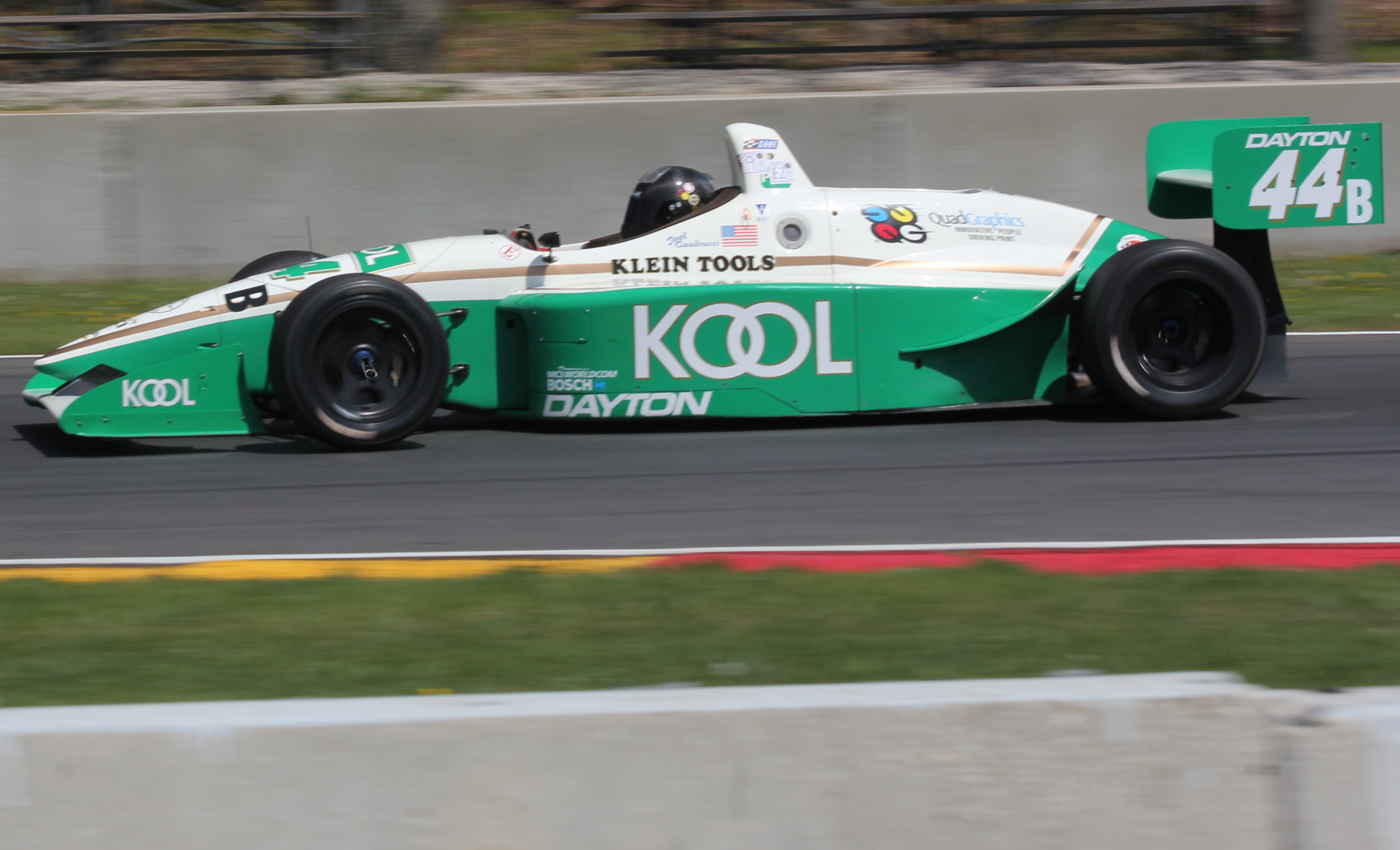
- Category: Indy Lights
- Constructor: Lola
- Predecessor: Lola T93/20

Technical specifications
- Chassis: Carbon fiber honeycomb composite monocoque
- Length: 183 in (4,600 mm)
- Width: 77.72 in (1,974 mm)
- Height: 39.5 in (1,000 mm)
- Axle track: Front: 67.26 in (1,708 mm); Rear: 62.54 in (1,589 mm)
- Wheelbase: 111 in (2,800 mm)
- Engine: Mid-engine, longitudinally mounted, 4.2 L (256.3 cu in), Buick 3800, 90° V6, OHV, NA
- Transmission: 5-speed manual
- Power: 425–450 hp (317–336 kW)
- Weight: 1,430–1,450 lb (650–660 kg) (track dependent)
- Tyres: Dayton Daytona 10" front, 14" rear

Competition history
- Debut: 1997

The Lola T97/20 is an open-wheel formula racing car chassis, designed, developed and built by British racing manufacturer and constructor Lola, for the one-make Indy Lights spec-series, a feeder-series for the CART IndyCar Series, between 1997 and 2001.
