= NACAM Formula 4 Championship =

Formula racing series

- Category: FIA Formula 4
- Country: Mexico
- Region: North America; Central America; Caribbean
- Inaugural season: 2015
- Constructors: Tatuus
- Engine suppliers: Abarth
- Tyre suppliers: Hoosier Racing Tire
- Drivers' champion: (Mexico) Zaky Ibrahim
- Official website: https://www.fiaformula4.mx

The North and Central American (NACAM) Formula 4 Championship is a formula racing series run to FIA Formula 4 regulations. The inaugural season was held over 2015 and 2016.

== History ==
Gerhard Berger and the FIA Singleseater Commission launched Formula 4 in March 2013. The goal of the Formula 4 was to make the ladder to Formula 1 more transparent. Besides sporting and technical regulations, costs were also regulated. A car to compete in this category may not exceed €30,000 and a single season in Formula 4 may not exceed €100,000. NACAM Formula 4 was the last series to start in 2015 and the eighth Formula 4 category overall.

Alexandra Mohnhaupt made history in 2018 as the first female driver to win a race to Formula 4 regulations, the Mexican driver winning the first and second races at the fourth round of the 2017–18 season.

== Car ==
Similarly to other Formula 4 championships, NACAM F4 uses the Tatuus F4-T421 chassis. They are powered by inline 4, 1.4 litre turbocharged engines provided by Abarth. Tyres are supplied by Pirelli.

== Champions ==
=== Drivers ===
Season	Champion	Team	Races	Poles	Wins	Podiums	Fastest lap	Points	Margins
2015–16	(Mexico) Axel Matus	(Mexico) Ram Racing	21	10	12	16	8	405	150
2016–17	(Guyana) Calvin Ming	(Mexico) Ram Racing	23	6	8	18	5	399	63
2017–18	(Mexico) Moisés de la Vara	(Mexico) Scuderia Martiga EG	22	7	9	16	8	386	106
2018–19	(Mexico) Manuel Sulaimán	(Mexico) Ram Racing	20	8	10	15	4	366	44
2019–20	(Mexico) Noel León	(Mexico) Ram Racing	20	10	7	15	5	325	45
2021	Non-scoring season								
2022	(Colombia) Juan Felipe Pedraza	(Mexico) Ram Racing	17	5	8	12	7	274	84
2023	(Colombia) Pedro Juan Moreno	(Mexico) Ram Racing	18	7	11	15	14	315	4
2024	(Mexico) José Carlos Hernández	(Mexico) Alessandros Racing	8	4	5	8	3	179	36
2025	(Mexico) Zaky Ibrahim	(Mexico) Ram Racing	17	2	6	8	5	256	3

=== Rookie Cup ===
Season	Champion	Team	Races	Poles	Wins	Podiums	Fastest lap	Points	Margins
2015–16	(Mexico) Moisés de la Vara	(Mexico) Momo F4	21	0	10	18	0	423	35
2016–17	(Mexico) Manuel Sulaimán	(Mexico) Ram Racing	15	0	12	14	2	336	133

=== Nations Cup ===
Season	Country	Races	Wins	Podiums	Points	Margins
2015–16	Colombia	21	14	18	422	185
2024	Mexico	8	7	8	193	132
2025	Mexico	17	16	17	418	368

== Circuits ==
- **Bold** denotes a circuit will be used in the 2026 season.

Number	Circuits	Rounds	Years
1	(Mexico City) **Autódromo Hermanos Rodríguez**	24 (Note: Autódromo Hermanos Rodríguez hosted 5 rounds in 2023, 4 rounds in 2022 and 2025, 3 rounds in 2017–18, 2 rounds in 2016–17, 2018–19 and 2024 seasons, and it will host at least 4 rounds again in 2026 season.)	2016–2019, 2022–present
2	(Puebla) **Autódromo Miguel E. Abed**	12 (Note: Autódromo Miguel E. Abed hosted 2 rounds in 2015–16, 2018–19 and 2025 seasons.)	2015–2016, 2018–2020, 2022–present
3	(Nuevo León) Autódromo de Monterrey	5	2016–2020
3	Autódromo de Querétaro	5 (Note: Autódromo de Querétaro hosted 2 rounds in 2019–20 and 2023 seasons.)	2020, 2022–2023
7	Autódromo Internacional de Aguascalientes	3	2016, 2018–2019
7	(San Luis Potosí) Parque Tangamanga	3	2016–2017, 2019
7	(Yucatán) **Autódromo Emerson Fittipaldi**	3	2017–2018, 2020, 2026
8	(State of Mexico) Circuito Centro Dinámico Pegaso	2	2016–2017
9	(United States) Circuit of the Americas	1	2016
9	(Quintana Roo) Autódromo Internacional de Cancún	1	2017
