= 6 Hours of Mexico =

FIA World Endurance Championship
- Venue: Autódromo Hermanos Rodríguez
- Corporate sponsor: AT&T
- First race: 1974
- First FIA WEC race: 2016 6 Hours of Mexico
- Last race: 2017 6 Hours of Mexico
- Duration: 6 hours
- Most wins (driver): (Germany) Jochen Mass (2) (Germany) Timo Bernhard (2) (New Zealand) Brendon Hartley (2)
- Most wins (team): (Germany) Team Sauber Mercedes (2) (Germany) Porsche Team (2)
- Most wins (manufacturer): Sauber (2), Porsche (2)

The 6 Hours of Mexico was a sports car race held at Autódromo Hermanos Rodríguez in Mexico City, Mexico. The race was first held in 1974 as part of the IMSA GT Championship. Fifteen years later, in 1989, the World Sportscar Championship reintroduced it as a 480 km event, and was held three times before the championship's demise. It was again revived in 2016 as a part of the FIA World Endurance Championship.

== Results ==
Year	Overall winner(s)	Entrant	Car	Distance/Duration	Race title	Championship	Report	Ref
1974	(Mexico) Guillermo Rojas (Mexico) Héctor Rebaque (Mexico) Fred van Beuren Jr.	(Mexico) Héctor Rebaque Sr.	Porsche Carrera	1000 km (621.5 mi)	1000 km of Mexico City	IMSA GT Championship	Report	
1975–1988: Not held
1989	(France) Jean-Louis Schlesser (West Germany) Jochen Mass	(West Germany) Team Sauber Mercedes	Sauber Mercedes C9	481.889 km (299.432 mi)	Trofeo Hermanos Rodríguez	World Sports Prototype Championship	Report	
1990	(Germany) Jochen Mass (Germany) Michael Schumacher	(Germany) Team Sauber Mercedes	Mercedes-Benz C11	481.889 km (299.432 mi)	Trofeo Hermanos Rodríguez	World Sports Prototype Championship	Report	
1991	(Finland) Keke Rosberg (France) Yannick Dalmas	(France) Peugeot Talbot Sport	Peugeot 905 Evo 1B	433.258 km (269.214 mi)	Trofeo Hermanos Rodríguez	World Sports Car Championship	Report	
1992–2015: Not held
2016	(Germany) Timo Bernhard (Australia) Mark Webber (New Zealand) Brendon Hartley	(Germany) Porsche Team	Porsche 919 Hybrid	989.92 km (615.11 mi)	6 Hours of Mexico	FIA World Endurance Championship	Report	
2017	(Germany) Timo Bernhard (New Zealand) Earl Bamber (New Zealand) Brendon Hartley	(Germany) Porsche Team	Porsche 919 Hybrid	1,032.96 km (641.85 mi)	6 Hours of Mexico	FIA World Endurance Championship	Report	
