= 2015–16 NACAM Formula 4 Championship =

Motor racing competition

The 2015–16 NACAM Formula 4 Championship season was the inaugural season of the NACAM Formula 4 Championship. It began on 1 November 2015 with a non-championship round at the Autódromo Hermanos Rodríguez in Mexico City, and finished on 25 June 2016 at the same venue after seven triple-header rounds.

== Teams and drivers ==
Team	No.	Driver	Class	Rounds
(Mexico) Telcel RPL Racing	2	(Mexico) José Sierra		All *
(Mexico) Telcel RPL Racing	24	(Mexico) Fernando Urrutia		All *
(Mexico) Telcel RPL Racing	79	(Colombia) Santiago Lozano		All *
(Mexico) Martiga EG	3	(Mexico) Patricio O'Ward		3–6 *
(Mexico) Martiga EG	16	(Mexico) Hugo Becerra, Jr.		1–2, 7
(Mexico) Martiga EG	18	(Mexico) Alexis Carreño		All *
Ming Guyana	4	(Guyana) Calvin Ming		1–2 *
(Mexico) Ram Racing	4	(Guyana) Calvin Ming		3–4, 7
(Mexico) Ram Racing	8	(Mexico) Axel Matus		All *
(Mexico) Ram Racing	26	(Australia) Luis Leeds		*
(Mexico) Ram Racing	35	(Mexico) Jorge Abed		All
(Mexico) MomoF4	5	(Mexico) Alexandra Mohnhaupt	R	All *
(Mexico) MomoF4	6	(Mexico) Moisés de la Vara	R	All *
(Mexico) MomoF4	7	(Mexico) Andrés Gutiérrez	R	6–7
(Mexico) Easy-Shop.com Racing	9	(Mexico) Daniel Forcadell		1, 3–7 *
(Mexico) Vecchi Racing	57	(Mexico) Giancarlo Vecchi		*
(Mexico) Del Campo Motorsport	15	(Mexico) Giancarlo Vecchi		1
(Mexico) Del Campo Motorsport	15	(Mexico) Luis Urbina		*
(Mexico) Del Campo Motorsport	85	(Mexico) Luis Alfonso Pérez		3, 6–7
(Mexico) Marespi Racing	20	(Mexico) Sergio "Marespi" Martínez		7 *
(Mexico) Marespi Racing	88	(Mexico) Luis Alfonso Pérez		1–2
(Mexico) Rodríguez Racing	22	(Mexico) José Carlos Sandoval		1–5, 7
(Panama) J Bernal Racing	31	(Spain) Nil Montserrat	G	3, 5
(Mexico) JV Motorsports	46	(Mexico) Irwin Vences		*
(Costa Rica) TCR Motorsport	46	(Trinidad and Tobago) Frankie Zack Boodram	R	1–4
(Mexico) IBC Racing	53	(Mexico) Alex Servín	R	7
(Mexico) CEDVA Motorsport	55	(Mexico) Jorge Contreras, Jr.		1–5 *
(Mexico) Moreno Racing	58	(Mexico) Alejandro Moreno		1 *

Icon	Class
R	Rookie
G	Guest drivers ineligible to score points

Drivers with an asterisk on their "Rounds" column took part in the non-championship opening round.

== Race calendar and results ==
The calendar was published on 19 July 2015. All rounds were held in Mexico. The initially scheduled first round was held as a non-championship race in support of the Formula One World Championship. An updated version of the calendar was published on 22 November. A more updated version was presented two days later during the official presentation of the first round. In December 2015, the calendar was remade again, this time with seven official dates. It was revised for a fourth time in February 2016, and for a fifth time later in April.

Round		Circuit	Date	Pole position	Fastest lap	Winning driver	Winning team	Rookie winner
2015
NC		Autódromo Hermanos Rodríguez (Mexico City)	1 November	(Australia) Luis Leeds	(Mexico) Patricio O'Ward	(Australia) Luis Leeds	(Mexico) Ram Racing	not awarded
1	R1	Autódromo Miguel E. Abed (Amozoc, Puebla)	5 December	(Mexico) Axel Matus	(Mexico) José Sierra	(Mexico) Axel Matus	(Mexico) Ram Racing	(Mexico) Moisés de la Vara
1	R2	Autódromo Miguel E. Abed (Amozoc, Puebla)	6 December		(Mexico) Giancarlo Vecchi	(Mexico) Giancarlo Vecchi	(Mexico) Del Campo Motorsport	(Mexico) Moisés de la Vara
1	R3	Autódromo Miguel E. Abed (Amozoc, Puebla)	6 December	(Mexico) Axel Matus	(Mexico) José Sierra	(Mexico) Axel Matus	(Mexico) Ram Racing	(Mexico) Alexandra Mohnhaupt
2016
2	R1	Autódromo Internacional de Aguascalientes (Aguascalientes, Aguascalientes)	30 January	(Mexico) Axel Matus	(Mexico) José Carlos Sandoval	(Mexico) Axel Matus	(Mexico) Ram Racing	(Mexico) Moisés de la Vara
2	R2	Autódromo Internacional de Aguascalientes (Aguascalientes, Aguascalientes)	31 January		(Mexico) Axel Matus	(Mexico) Axel Matus	(Mexico) Ram Racing	(Trinidad and Tobago) Frankie Zack Boodram
2	R3	Autódromo Internacional de Aguascalientes (Aguascalientes, Aguascalientes)	31 January	(Mexico) Axel Matus	(Mexico) José Sierra	(Mexico) Axel Matus	(Mexico) Ram Racing	(Trinidad and Tobago) Frankie Zack Boodram
3	R1	Parque Tangamanga (San Luis Potosí, San Luis Potosí)	27 February	(Mexico) Axel Matus	(Mexico) Axel Matus	(Mexico) Axel Matus	(Mexico) Ram Racing	(Mexico) Moisés de la Vara
3	R2	Parque Tangamanga (San Luis Potosí, San Luis Potosí)	28 February		(Mexico) José Carlos Sandoval	(Mexico) Moisés de la Vara	(Mexico) MomoF4	(Mexico) Moisés de la Vara
3	R3	Parque Tangamanga (San Luis Potosí, San Luis Potosí)	28 February	(Mexico) Axel Matus	(Mexico) Axel Matus	(Mexico) Patricio O'Ward	(Mexico) Martiga EG	(Mexico) Alexandra Mohnhaupt
4	R1	Centro Dinámico Pegaso (Toluca, Estado de México)	2 April	(Mexico) Patricio O'Ward	(Mexico) Patricio O'Ward	(Mexico) Patricio O'Ward	(Mexico) Martiga EG	(Mexico) Moisés de la Vara
4	R2	Centro Dinámico Pegaso (Toluca, Estado de México)	3 April		(Mexico) Patricio O'Ward	(Mexico) Patricio O'Ward	(Mexico) Martiga EG	(Mexico) Moisés de la Vara
4	R3	Centro Dinámico Pegaso (Toluca, Estado de México)	3 April	(Mexico) Patricio O'Ward	(Mexico) Patricio O'Ward	(Mexico) Patricio O'Ward	(Mexico) Martiga EG	(Mexico) Moisés de la Vara
5	R1	Autódromo Miguel E. Abed (Amozoc, Puebla)	6 May	(Mexico) Axel Matus	(Mexico) Axel Matus	(Mexico) Axel Matus	(Mexico) Ram Racing	(Mexico) Moisés de la Vara
5	R2	Autódromo Miguel E. Abed (Amozoc, Puebla)	8 May		(Mexico) Patricio O'Ward	(Mexico) Fernando Urrutia	(Mexico) Telcel RPL Racing	(Mexico) Alexandra Mohnhaupt
5	R3	Autódromo Miguel E. Abed (Amozoc, Puebla)	8 May	(Mexico) Axel Matus	(Mexico) Fernando Urrutia	(Mexico) Axel Matus	(Mexico) Ram Racing	(Mexico) Moisés de la Vara
6	R1	Autódromo de Monterrey (Apodaca, Nuevo León)	11 June	(Mexico) Axel Matus	(Mexico) Axel Matus	(Mexico) Patricio O'Ward	(Mexico) Martiga EG	(Mexico) Andrés Gutiérrez
6	R2	Autódromo de Monterrey (Apodaca, Nuevo León)	12 June		(Mexico) Patricio O'Ward	(Mexico) Patricio O'Ward	(Mexico) Martiga EG	(Mexico) Andrés Gutiérrez
6	R3	Autódromo de Monterrey (Apodaca, Nuevo León)	12 June	(Mexico) Axel Matus	(Mexico) Andrés Gutiérrez	(Mexico) Axel Matus	(Mexico) Ram Racing	(Mexico) Andrés Gutiérrez
7	R1	Autódromo Hermanos Rodríguez (Mexico City)	24 June	(Mexico) Andrés Gutiérrez	(Mexico) Axel Matus	(Mexico) Axel Matus	(Mexico) Ram Racing	(Mexico) Andrés Gutiérrez
7	R2	Autódromo Hermanos Rodríguez (Mexico City)	25 June		(Mexico) Axel Matus	(Mexico) Axel Matus	(Mexico) Ram Racing	(Mexico) Andrés Gutiérrez
7	R3	Autódromo Hermanos Rodríguez (Mexico City)	25 June	(Mexico) Andrés Gutiérrez	(Mexico) Axel Matus	(Mexico) Axel Matus	(Mexico) Ram Racing	(Mexico) Andrés Gutiérrez

== Championship standings ==
Points were awarded to every classified finisher in each race. Five points were awarded to the driver with the fastest time in qualifying. One point was awarded for fastest lap. The championship followed the same scoring rules as MSA Formula did in 2015.

Position	**1st**	**2nd**	**3rd**	**4th**	**5th**	**6th**	**7th**	**8th**	**9th**	**10th+**	R1 PP	FL
Points	25	18	15	12	10	8	6	4	2	1	5	1

=== Drivers' Championship ===
Pos	Driver	PUE1			AGS			SLP			EDM			PUE2			MTY			MEX			Pts
Pos	Driver	R1	R2	R3	R1	R2	R3	R1	R2	R3	R1	R2	R3	R1	R2	R3	R1	R2	R3	R1	R2	R3	Pts
1	(Mexico) Axel Matus	**1**	Ret	**1**	**1**	1	**1**	**1**	Ret	**11**	2	9	DSQ	**1**	3	**1**	**2**	2	**1**	1	1	1	405
2	(Mexico) José Sierra	5	2	2	4	7	2	4	2	5	3	4	10	3	4	2	8	5	4	5	7	3	255
3	(Mexico) Patricio O'Ward							2	NC	1	**1**	1	**1**	2	2	3	1	1	2				247
4	(Mexico) Fernando Urrutia	2	15	11	2	3	5	3	4	3	5	2	2	6	1	4	5	Ret	5	6	6	7	239
5	(Mexico) José Carlos Sandoval	3	4	6	3	5	Ret	5	12	2	4	Ret	3	4	5	6				4	4	5	182
6	(Colombia) Santiago Lozano	9	8	10	5	2	3	7	Ret	6	7	Ret	7	Ret	10	5	4	4	6	7	5	6	144
7	(Mexico) Andrés Gutiérrez																3	3	3	**2**	2	**2**	105
8	(Mexico) Moisés de la Vara	10	7	Ret	6	12	10	8	1	Ret	6	5	4	7	11	8	9	7	9	10	9	Ret	100
9	(Mexico) Luis Alfonso Pérez	7	6	3	8	NC	6	6	3	10							6	Ret	7	8	3	9	100
10	(Mexico) Alexis Carreño	8	3	9	10	9	7	10	9	7	8	DNS	Ret	5	6	7	7	6	10	Ret	Ret	8	88
11	(Guyana) Calvin Ming	16	9	7	9	Ret	12	Ret	5	4	Ret	3	Ret							3	8	4	80
12	(Mexico) Jorge Contreras, Jr.	11	10	8	7	4	Ret	9	8	DSQ	Ret	7	5	8	8	9							60
13	(Mexico) Alexandra Mohnhaupt	15	11	14	11	10	9	11	7	8	9	6	6	9	9	10	12	8	8	11	11	11	57
14	(Mexico) Hugo Becerra, Jr.	4	5	5	14	6	4													9	Ret	DNS	55
15	(Mexico) Giancarlo Vecchi	6	1	4																			46
16	(Mexico) Jorge Abed	12	13	13	13	11	11	12	10	9	10	8	8	10	12	12	11	10	12	12	12	14	29
17	(Trinidad and Tobago) Frankie Zack Boodram	17	14	15	12	8	8	Ret	11	DNS	DNS	DNS	DNS										13
18	(Mexico) Daniel Forcadell	13	12	12				DSQ	DSQ	DSQ	Ret	Ret	9	DNS	DSQ	DSQ	10	9	11	13	Ret	10	11
19	(Mexico) Sergio Martínez																			14	10	12	3
20	(Mexico) Alex Servín																			15	13	13	3
21	(Mexico) Alejandro Moreno	14	DNS	DNS																			1
Drivers with non-American licence ineligible for championship points
	(Spain) Nil Montserrat							13	6	12				Ret	7	11							0
Pos	Driver	R1	R2	R3	R1	R2	R3	R1	R2	R3	R1	R2	R3	R1	R2	R3	R1	R2	R3	R1	R2	R3	Pts
Pos	Driver	PUE1			AGS			SLP			EDM			PUE2			MTY			MEX			Pts

Colour	Result
Gold	Winner
Silver	Second place
Bronze	Third place
Green	Points classification
Blue	Non-points classification
Blue	Non-classified finish (NC)
Purple	Retired, not classified (Ret)
Red	Did not qualify (DNQ)
Red	Did not pre-qualify (DNPQ)
Black	Disqualified (DSQ)
White	Did not start (DNS)
White	Withdrew (WD)
White	Race cancelled (C)
Blank	Did not practice (DNP)
Blank	Did not arrive (DNA)
Blank	Excluded (EX)

**Bold** – Pole
Italics – Fastest Lap

=== Rookie Cup ===
Pos	Driver	PUE1			AGS			SLP			EDM			PUE2			MTY			MEX			Pts
Pos	Driver	R1	R2	R3	R1	R2	R3	R1	R2	R3	R1	R2	R3	R1	R2	R3	R1	R2	R3	R1	R2	R3	Pts
1	(Mexico) Moisés de la Vara	**10**	7	Ret	**6**	12	10	**8**	1	Ret	**6**	5	4	**7**	11	8	9	7	9	10	9	Ret	423
2	(Mexico) Alexandra Mohnhaupt	15	11	14	11	10	9	11	7	8	9	6	6	9	9	10	12	8	8	11	11	11	388
3	(Mexico) Andrés Gutiérrez																**3**	3	3	**2**	2	2	166
4	(Trinidad and Tobago) Frankie Zack Boodram	16	14	15	12	8	8	Ret	11	DNS	DNS	DNS	DNS										129
5	(Mexico) Alex Servín																			15	13	13	39
Pos	Driver	R1	R2	R3	R1	R2	R3	R1	R2	R3	R1	R2	R3	R1	R2	R3	R1	R2	R3	R1	R2	R3	Pts
Pos	Driver	PUE1			AGS			SLP			EDM			PUE2			MTY			MEX			Pts

=== Nations Cup ===
Pos	Nation	PUE1			AGS			SLP			EDM			PUE2			MTY			MEX			Pts
Pos	Nation	R1	R2	R3	R1	R2	R3	R1	R2	R3	R1	R2	R3	R1	R2	R3	R1	R2	R3	R1	R2	R3	Pts
1	Colombia	9	8	10	5	2	3	7	Ret	6	7	Ret	7	Ret	10	5	4	4	6	7	5	6	422
2	Guyana	16	9	7	9	Ret	12	Ret	5	4	Ret	3	Ret							3	8	4	237
3	Trinidad and Tobago	16	14	15	12	8	8	Ret	11	DNS	DNS	DNS	DNS										114
Pos	Nation	R1	R2	R3	R1	R2	R3	R1	R2	R3	R1	R2	R3	R1	R2	R3	R1	R2	R3	R1	R2	R3	Pts
Pos	Nation	PUE1			AGS			SLP			EDM			PUE2			MTY			MEX			Pts

== See also ==
- Panam GP Series
- LATAM Challenge Series
