= Autódromo Hermanos Rodríguez =

Auto race track in Mexico City, Mexico

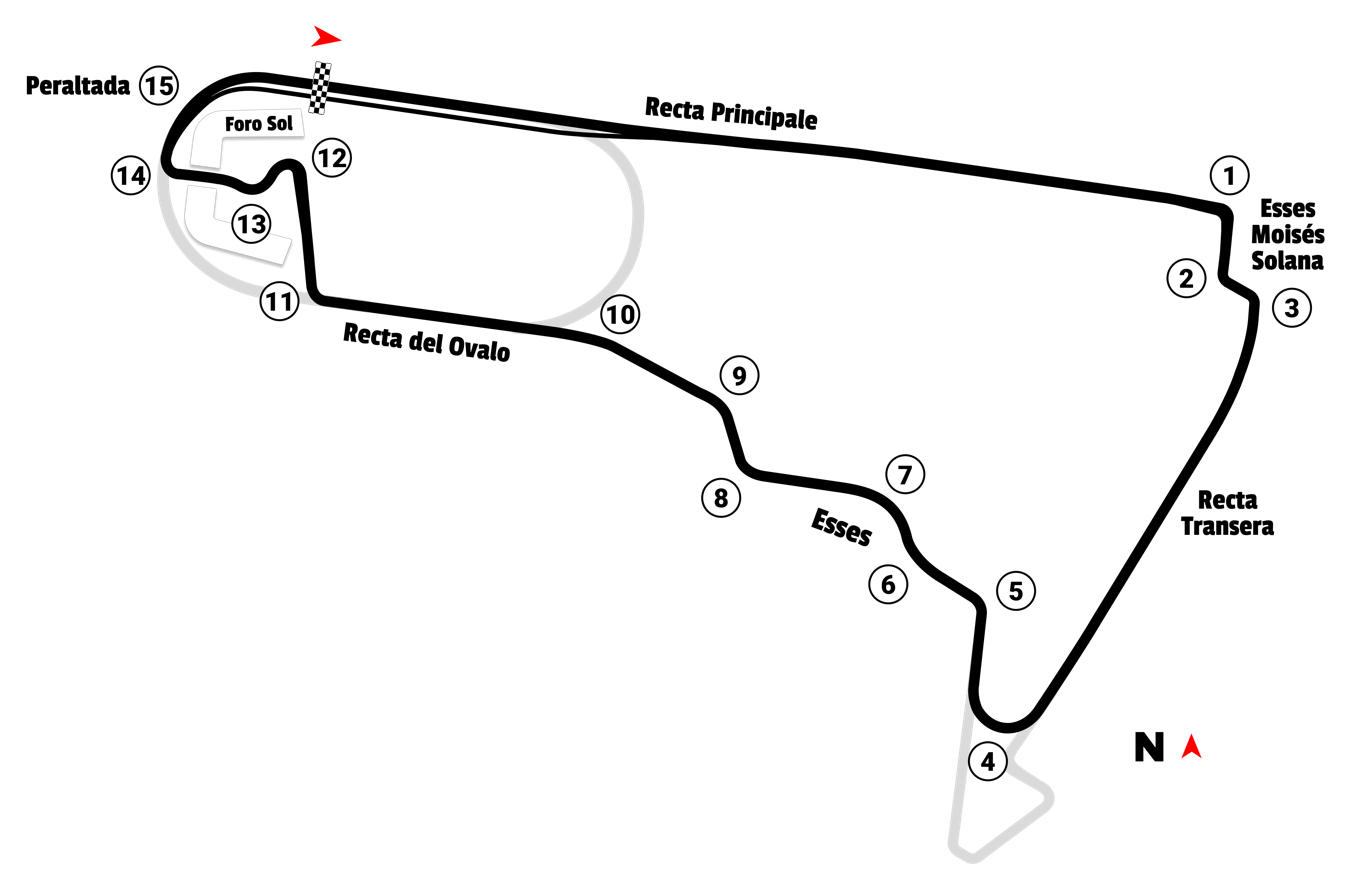
- The Autódromo Hermanos Rodríguez Grand Prix circuit (2015–present) The Autódromo Hermanos Rodríguez Formula E circuit (2020–2022, 2026) The Autódromo Hermanos Rodríguez National Circuit with Foro Sol (2015–present)
- Location: Mexico City, Mexico
- Coordinates: 19°24′22″N 99°5′33″W
- Capacity: 110,000
- FIA Grade: 1 (GP); FE (Formula E)
- Broke ground: 1959
- Opened: 20 November 1959; 66 years ago
- Former names: Autódromo Magdalena Mixhuca (1959–1979)
- Major events: Current: Formula One; Mexico City Grand Prix (2021–present); Mexican Grand Prix (1962–1970, 1986–1992, 2015–2019); FIA Formula E Championship; Mexico City ePrix (2016–2020, 2022–present); NASCAR Mexico Series (2004–2019, 2022–present); Former: FIA WEC; 6 Hours of Mexico (1989–1991, 2016–2017); NASCAR Cup Series; Viva México 250 (2025); NASCAR Xfinity Series; The Chilango 150 (2005–2008, 2025); TCR World Tour (2025); Race of Champions (2019); Trans-Am Series (1978–1979, 1991); CART/Champ Car World Series; Gran Premio Tecate (1980–1981, 2002–2007); Grand Am Rolex Sports Car Series; Mexico City 400k (2005–2008); A1 Grand Prix (2007–2008); IMSA GT Championship (1974); USRRC (1968)
- Website: https://ahr.mx/

Grand Prix Circuit (2015–present)
- Surface: Asphalt
- Length: 4.304 km (2.674 mi)
- Turns: 17
- Race lap record: 1:17.774 ( (Finland) Valtteri Bottas, Mercedes W12, 2021, F1)

Formula E Circuit (2020–2022, 2026)
- Surface: Asphalt
- Length: 2.606 km (1.619 mi)
- Turns: 16
- Race lap record: 1:07.474 ( (United Kingdom) Jake Dennis, Porsche 99X Electric, 2026, F-E)

National Circuit (2015–present)
- Surface: Asphalt
- Length: 3.909 km (2.429 mi)
- Turns: 15
- Race lap record: 1:33.010 ( (Mexico) Axel Matus, Mygale M14-F4, 2016, F4)

Oval Circuit (1962–present)
- Surface: Asphalt
- Length: 1.609 km (1.000 mi)
- Turns: 4
- Race lap record: 0:32.081 ( (Mexico) Antonio Pérez, Toyota Camry NASCAR, 2015, Stock car racing)

Formula E Circuit (2023–2025)
- Surface: Asphalt
- Length: 2.628 km (1.633 mi)
- Turns: 19
- Race lap record: 1:12.547 ( (Switzerland) Sébastien Buemi, Jaguar I-Type 7, 2025, F-E)

Formula E Circuit (2017–2019)
- Surface: Asphalt
- Length: 2.093 km (1.301 mi)
- Turns: 17
- Race lap record: 1:01.112 ( (Germany) Pascal Wehrlein, Mahindra M5Electro, 2019, F-E)

Original Formula E Circuit (2016)
- Surface: Asphalt
- Length: 2.091 km (1.299 mi)
- Turns: 18
- Race lap record: 1:04.569 ( (France) Nico Prost, Renault Z.E 15, 2016, F-E)

Grand Prix Circuit (1986–2014)
- Surface: Asphalt
- Length: 4.421 km (2.747 mi)
- Turns: 14
- Race lap record: 1:16.788 ( (United Kingdom) Nigel Mansell, Williams FW14, 1991, F1)

NASCAR Circuit (2007–2014)
- Surface: Asphalt
- Length: 4.053 km (2.518 mi)
- Turns: 16
- Race lap record: 1:20.521 ( (United States) Alex Gurney, Riley Mk XX, 2008, DP)

Champ Car Grand Prix Circuit (2006–2007)
- Surface: Asphalt
- Length: 4.463 km (2.773 mi)
- Turns: 17
- Race lap record: 1:24.713 ( (Netherlands) Robert Doornbos, Panoz DP01, 2007, Champ Car)

NASCAR Circuit (2005–2006)
- Surface: Asphalt
- Length: 4.052 km (2.518 mi)
- Turns: 16
- Race lap record: 1:22.931 ( (United States) Scott Pruett, Riley Mk XI, 2006, DP)

CART/Champ Car Grand Prix Circuit (2002–2005)
- Surface: Asphalt
- Length: 4.484 km (2.786 mi)
- Turns: 17
- Race lap record: 1:27.248 ( (Japan) Shinji Nakano, Lola B02/00, 2002, CART)

Original Grand Prix Circuit (1959–1985)
- Surface: Asphalt
- Length: 5.000 km (3.107 mi)
- Turns: 14
- Race lap record: 1:43.050 ( (Belgium) Jacky Ickx, Brabham BT26A, 1969, F1)

Original Short Circuit (1959–1985)
- Surface: Asphalt
- Length: 3.991 km (2.480 mi)
- Turns: 10
- Race lap record: 1:17.631 ( (United States) Norm Hunter, Ralt RT4, 1982, Formula Atlantic)

The Autódromo Hermanos Rodríguez is a 4.304 km (2.674 mi) motorsport race track in Mexico City, Mexico, named after the racing drivers Ricardo Rodríguez (1942–1962) and Pedro Rodríguez (1940–1971). The circuit got its current name in 1979 after Ricardo Rodríguez died in practice for the non-Championship 1962 Mexican Grand Prix and his brother Pedro was also killed behind the wheel nine years later. Since 2015, the track has once again hosted the Formula One Mexican Grand Prix, an event it previously hosted in two separate periods on a different layout, the last occasion of which was in 1992. Since 2021 the event has been held under the name "Mexico City Grand Prix".

The circuit is located within the public park of the Magdalena Mixhuca Sports City in southeast Mexico City. The circuit is owned by the Government of the City, but is currently operated under concession by Corporación Interamericana de Entretenimiento (CIE) through OCESA, one of CIE's subsidiaries. CIE also organizes the NASCAR Mexico Series races in this circuit and rents the circuits to other parties, including race organizers, automobile clubs and track amateurs for fees that are controversial due to their disproportionately high amounts compared to other ex-F1 courses.

The NASCAR Xfinity Series started racing at Autódromo Hermanos Rodríguez in the 2005 season and ended in the 2008 season, with a one off return in 2025. Martin Truex Jr. won the race in 2005, and Denny Hamlin won in 2006. For the 2007 race, the chicane was removed to increase passing opportunities down the front straight and into turn 1, and Juan Pablo Montoya from Bogotá, Colombia, won the race. Kyle Busch was the winner of the race in 2008. The layout was changed for 2025 and Daniel Suárez won the race.

The A1 Grand Prix series started racing at Autódromo Hermanos Rodríguez in the 2006–07 season using the full-track configuration used by Formula One. Alex Yoong from Malaysia won the sprint race and Oliver Jarvis from the United Kingdom won the feature race. In the 2007–08 season, Jonny Reid from New Zealand won the sprint race and Adam Carroll of Team Ireland won the feature race.

== History ==
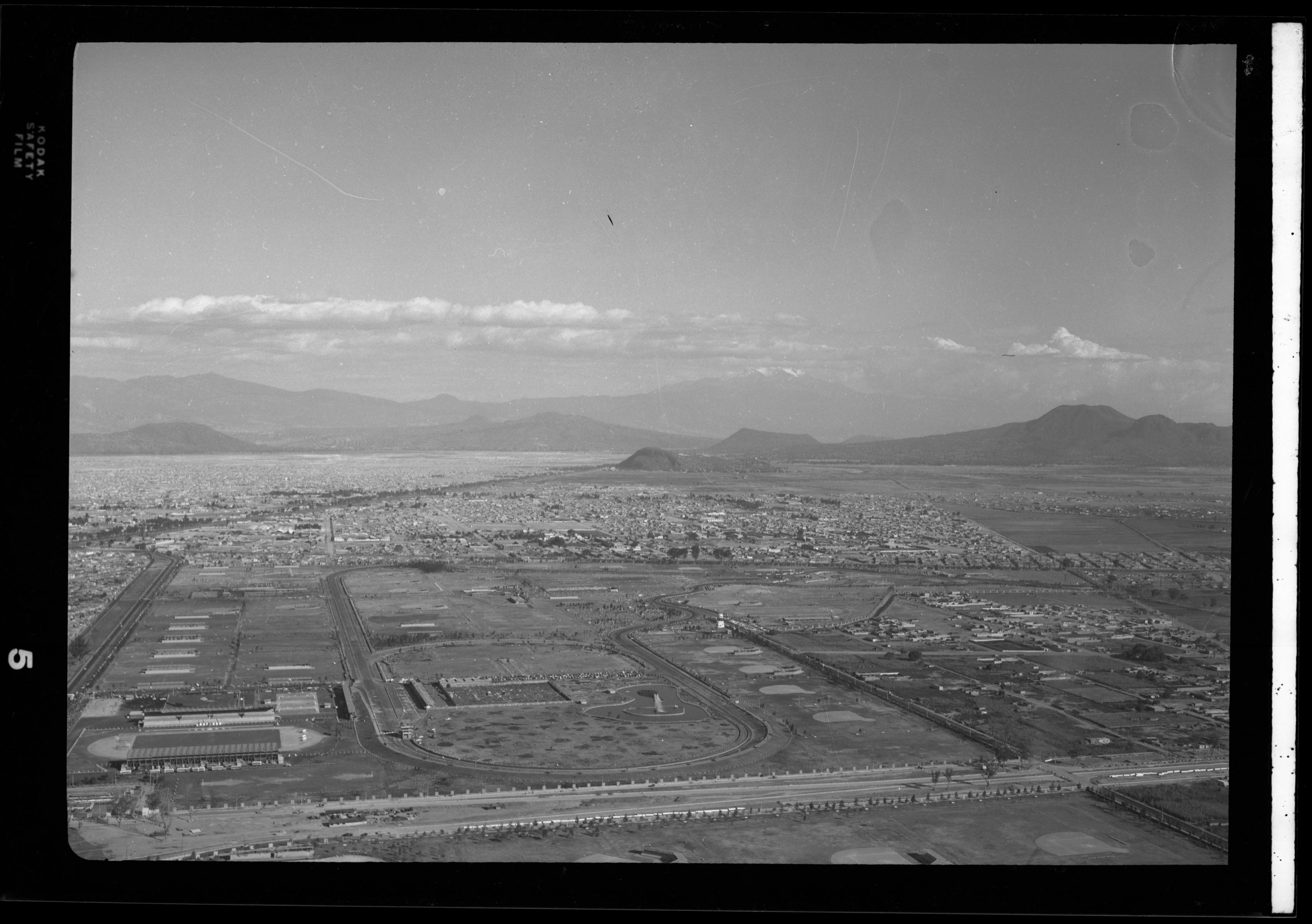
Aerial view of the circuit, November 1962.

Built in the Magdalena Mixhuca public park in 1959, the circuit hosted its first Formula One Grand Prix in 1962, as a non-Championship race. The following year the Mexican Grand Prix became a full World Championship event. The circuit remained part of the F1 calendar through 1970, when spectator overcrowding caused unsafe conditions. When F1 returned in 1986, the circuit boasted a new pit complex, as well as improved safety all around, but left again after 1992 due to safety concerns.

In 2001 CIE and Forsythe Racing tasked D3 Motorsport Development with revamping the circuit. A redesign to include the Foro and a complete upgrade of the circuit was done. It saw a record crowd of 402,413 people attend a round of the CART Championship in 2002.

It was announced in May 2012, that the circuit would again host the Mexican Grand Prix from 2013, in a five-year deal that would see it replace the European Grand Prix in Valencia, but this did not happen. The FIA listed the Mexican Grand Prix as the 19th round of the provisional schedule for the 2014 season, but it was not on the final schedule. The Mexican Grand Prix was listed on the 2015 Formula One calendar published by the FIA on 3 December 2014, with Formula One making its return to the circuit with the race on 1 November 2015.

The racetrack is also home to Electric Daisy Carnival (EDC Mexico), a music festival attended by over 200,000 people.

== The Grand Prix circuit ==
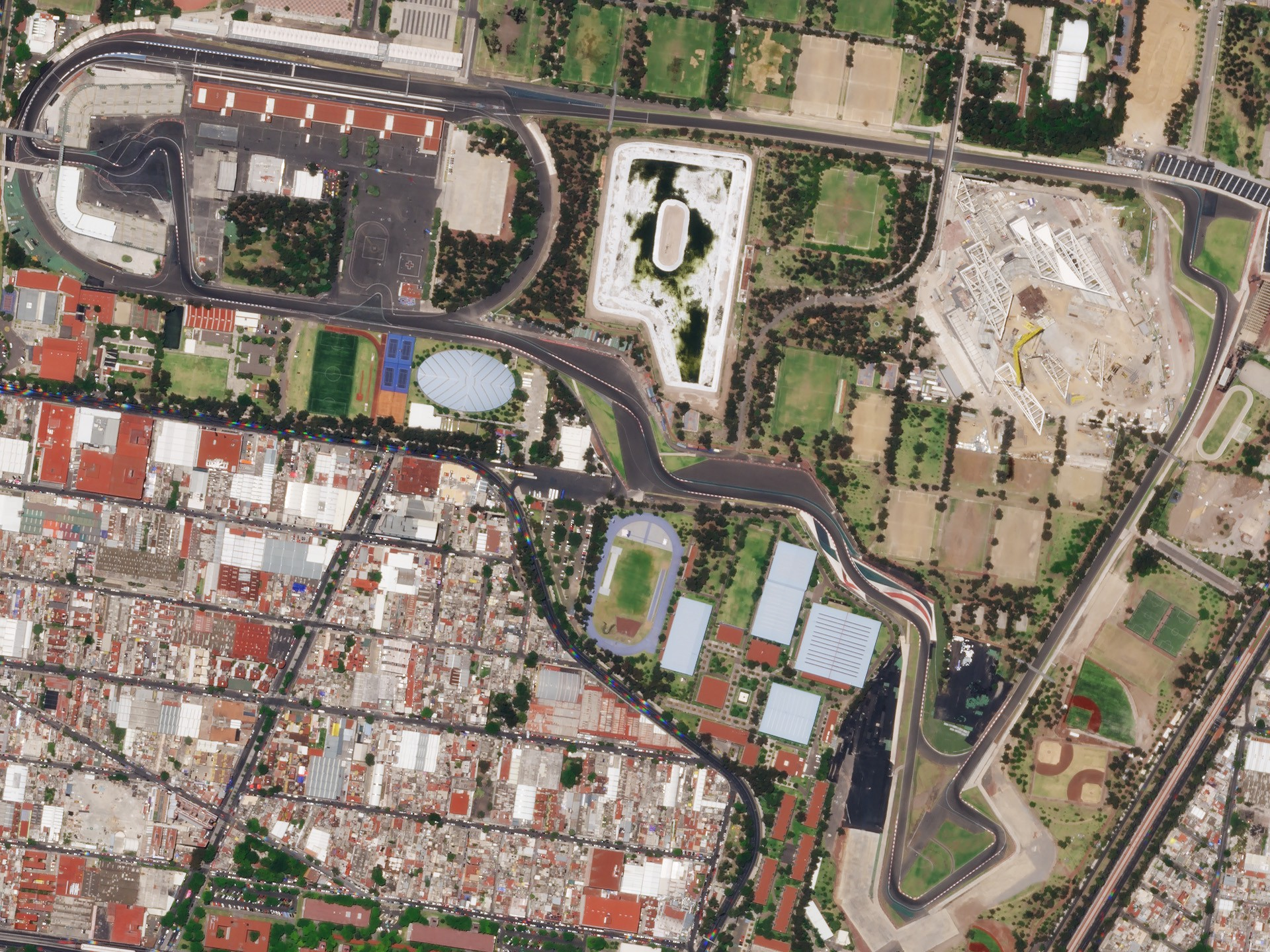
Satellite view of the circuit, as it appeared in 2018

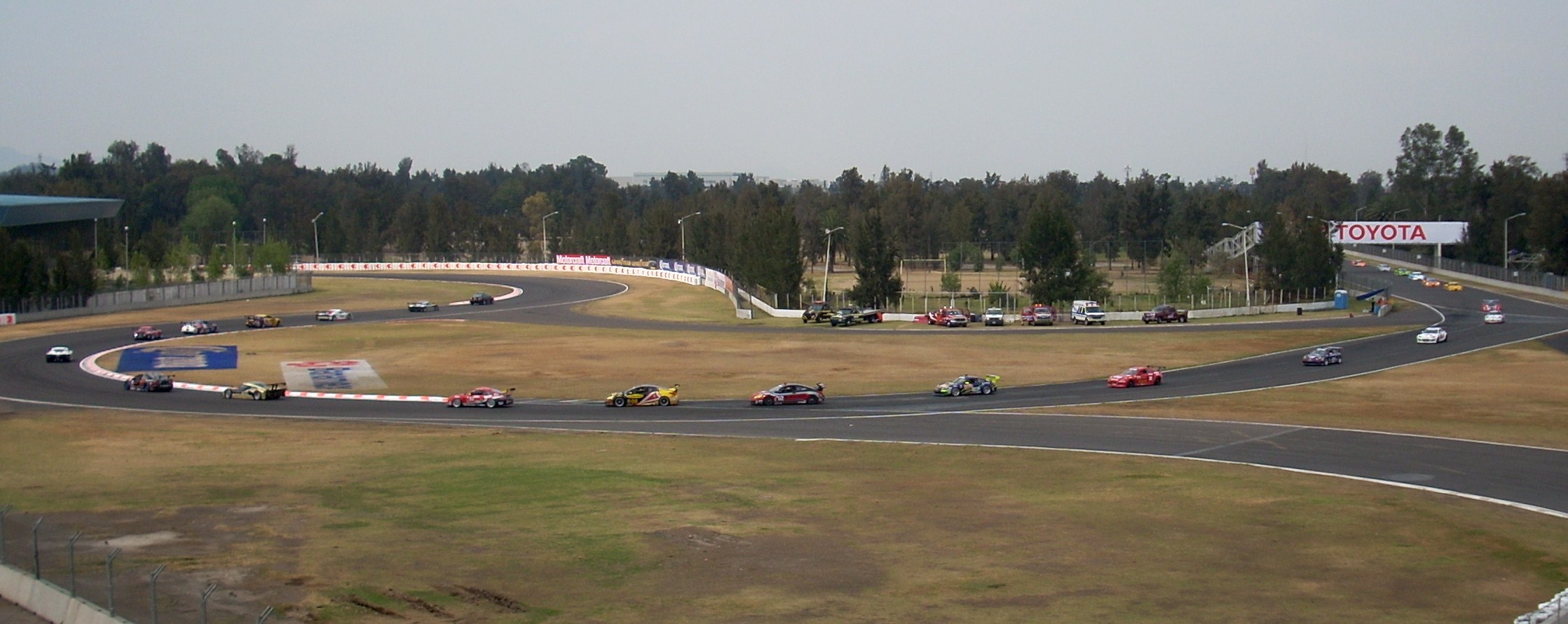
Grand-Am Rolex Series taking a bypass from turn 4 to turn 8

Designed as his thesis by student Óscar Fernández in 1953, the circuit has an elevation of 2,238 m (7,343 ft); the thin air causes difficulties for both the drivers and their cars. It also reduces the levels of aerodynamic drag that cars experience, meaning that higher downforce setups can be used with less impact on straight-line speed.

The circuit has an extremely fast final corner (the Peraltada, turn 17) before a long start/finish straight, and thus reminded some of Monza Circuit; however, unlike Monza's Parabolica curve, the Peraltada curve is slightly banked, allowing even more speed through the corner. It was at this corner that the younger Rodríguez fatally crashed, due to suspension failure. After the last F1 Mexican Grand Prix in 1992, a baseball stadium called the "Foro" was built on the inner part of this curve. When the Champ Car series began using the track in 2002, the Peraltada curve was partially bypassed by a series of sharp turns entering and exiting the Foro; re-entering the Peraltada halfway through.

After the Peraltada comes the long 1.2 km (0.75 mi) front straight. During the original turbo era in Formula One the faster cars were regularly clocking speeds of up to 330 km/h (205 mph) on the straight.

In the 2005 NASCAR Busch Series season, there was a chicane on the main straightaway to slow the cars down. They also introduced a curve between the short course and the Ese del Lago to bypass the latter, but avoiding the stadium detour.

The Grand Prix circuit underwent a significant renovation under the direction of Hermann Tilke for the return of Formula One in 2015. The front straight was slightly extended and reprofiled to accommodate a new media center and paddock. The iconic esses between turns 7 and 13 were significantly modified; the prolific, high radius turns largely diminished and some replaced with fixed angle turns. The baseball field portion of the track was also altered to a low-speed left-right combination that bypassed the first half of the Peraltada, allowing the cars to re-enter the Peraltada halfway through the corner. At 4.304 km (2.674 mi), the course is 170 m (560 ft) shorter than the previous Grand Prix layout, and Mexican Grand Prix organizers predicted lap times of around 75 seconds and speeds in excess of 328 km/h (204 mph) for the current turbocharged Formula One cars, which eliminate the adverse effects of altitude present in naturally aspirated cars. However, the modern V6 hybrid turbo Formula One cars actually managed to reach top speeds in excess of 370 km/h (230 mph) down the main straight.

The maximum speed recorded in a 2025 Formula One car was 363 km/h (226 mph), established at the end of the start/finish straight.

== Layout history ==
Autódromo Hermanos Rodríguez layout history
Grand Prix Circuit (1959–1985)

Oval Circuit (1962–present)

Grand Prix Circuit (1986–2014)

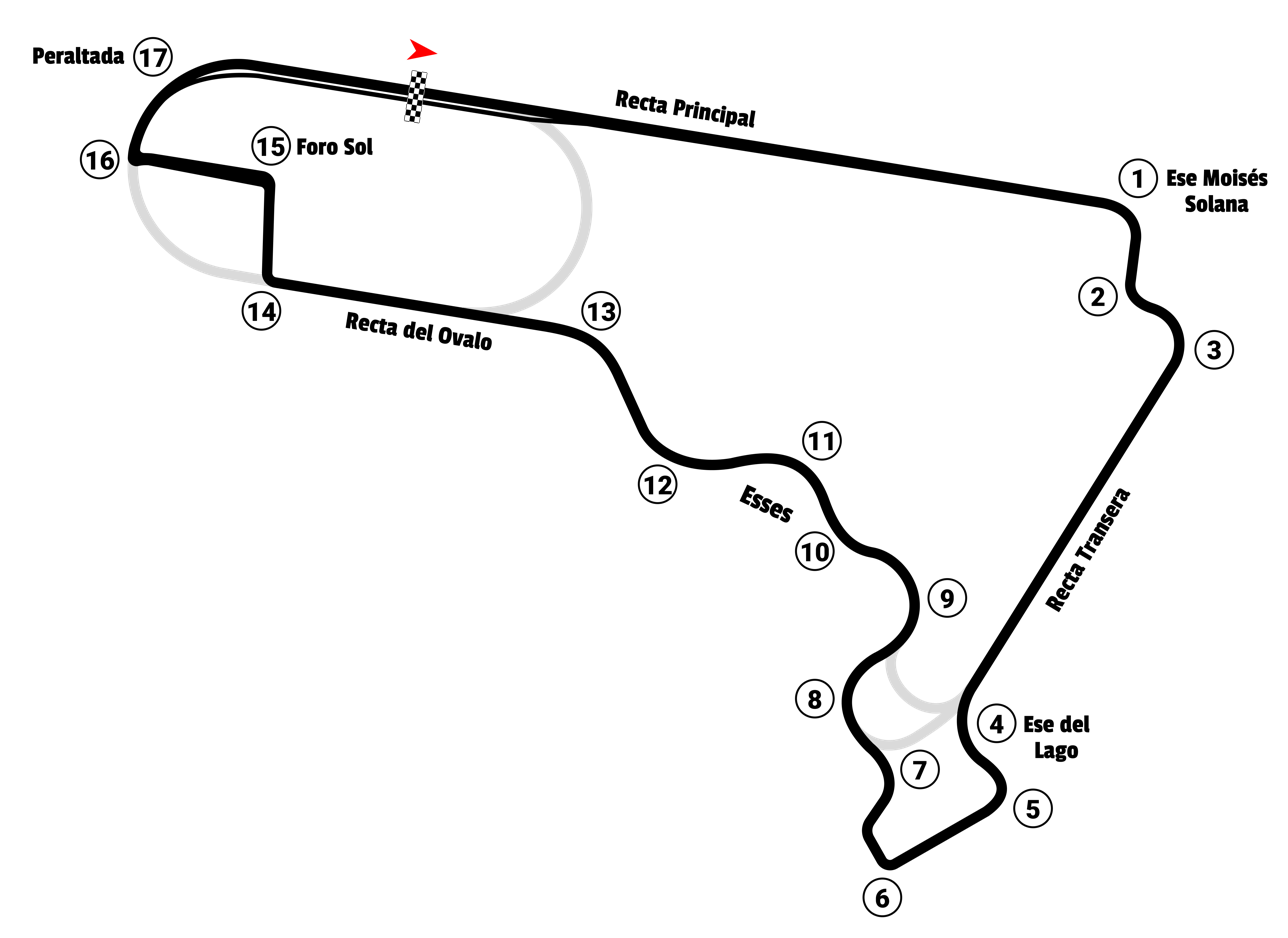
CART/Champ Car Grand Prix Circuit (2002–2005)

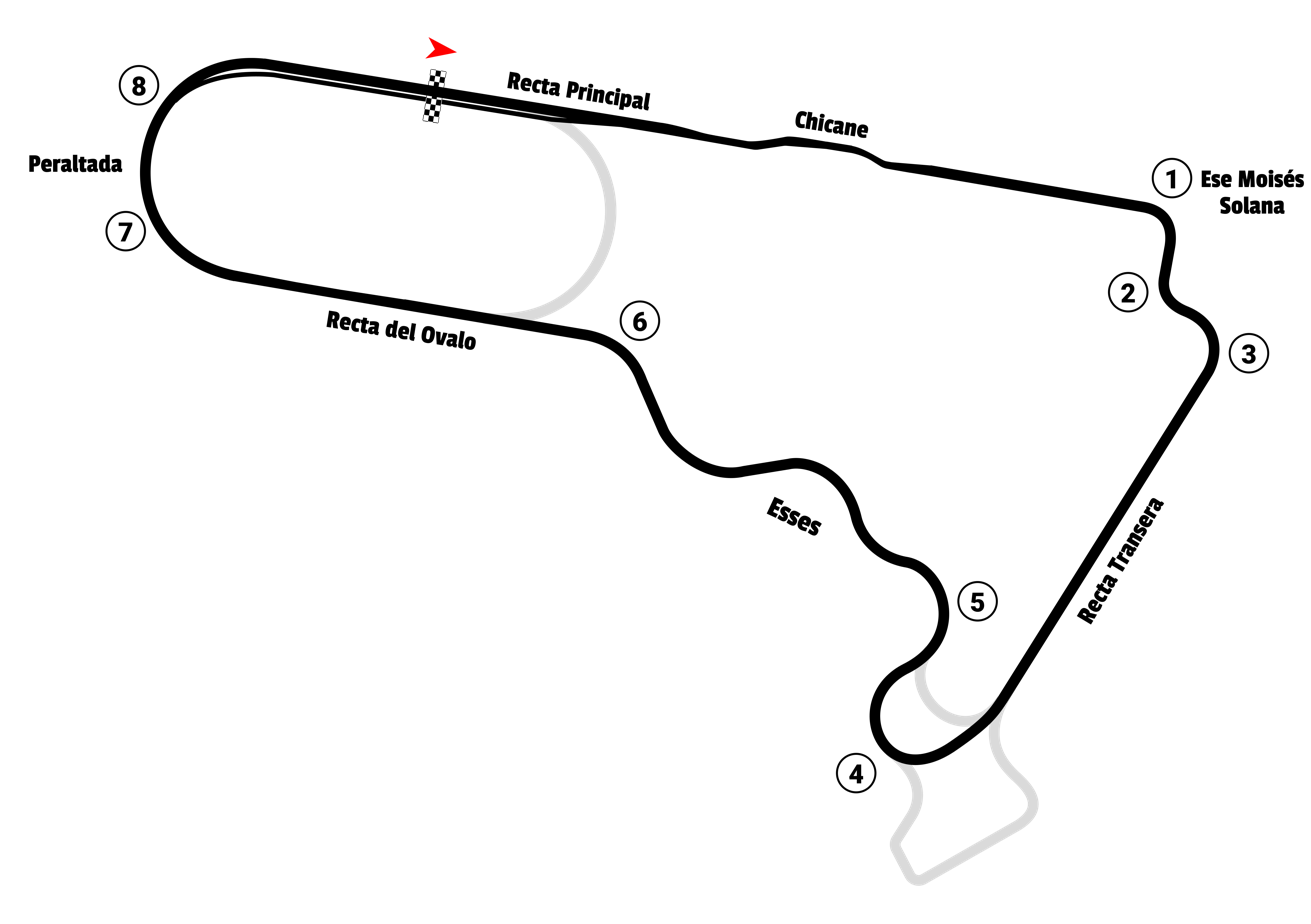
NASCAR Circuit (2005–2006)

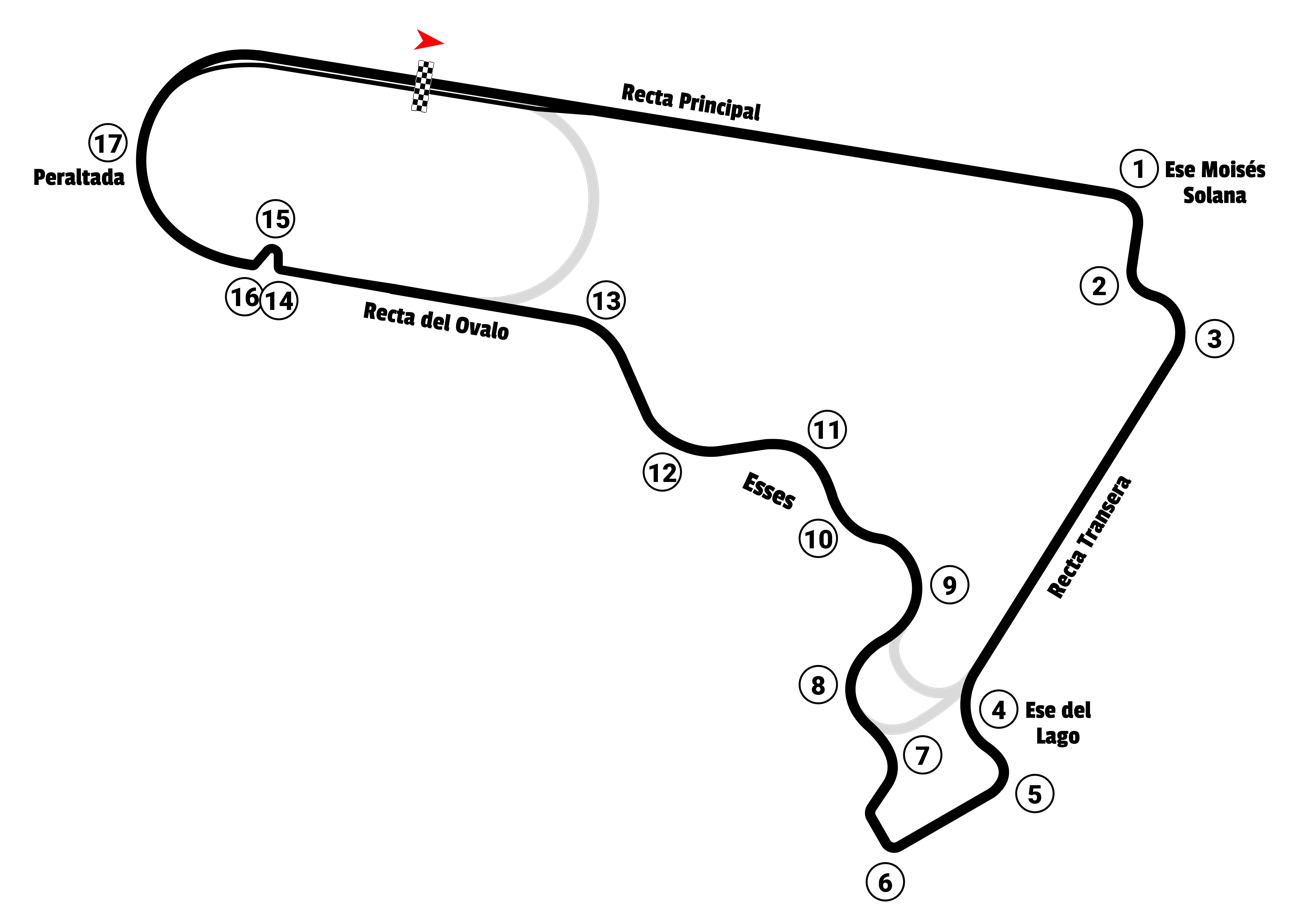
Champ Car Grand Prix Circuit (2006–2007)

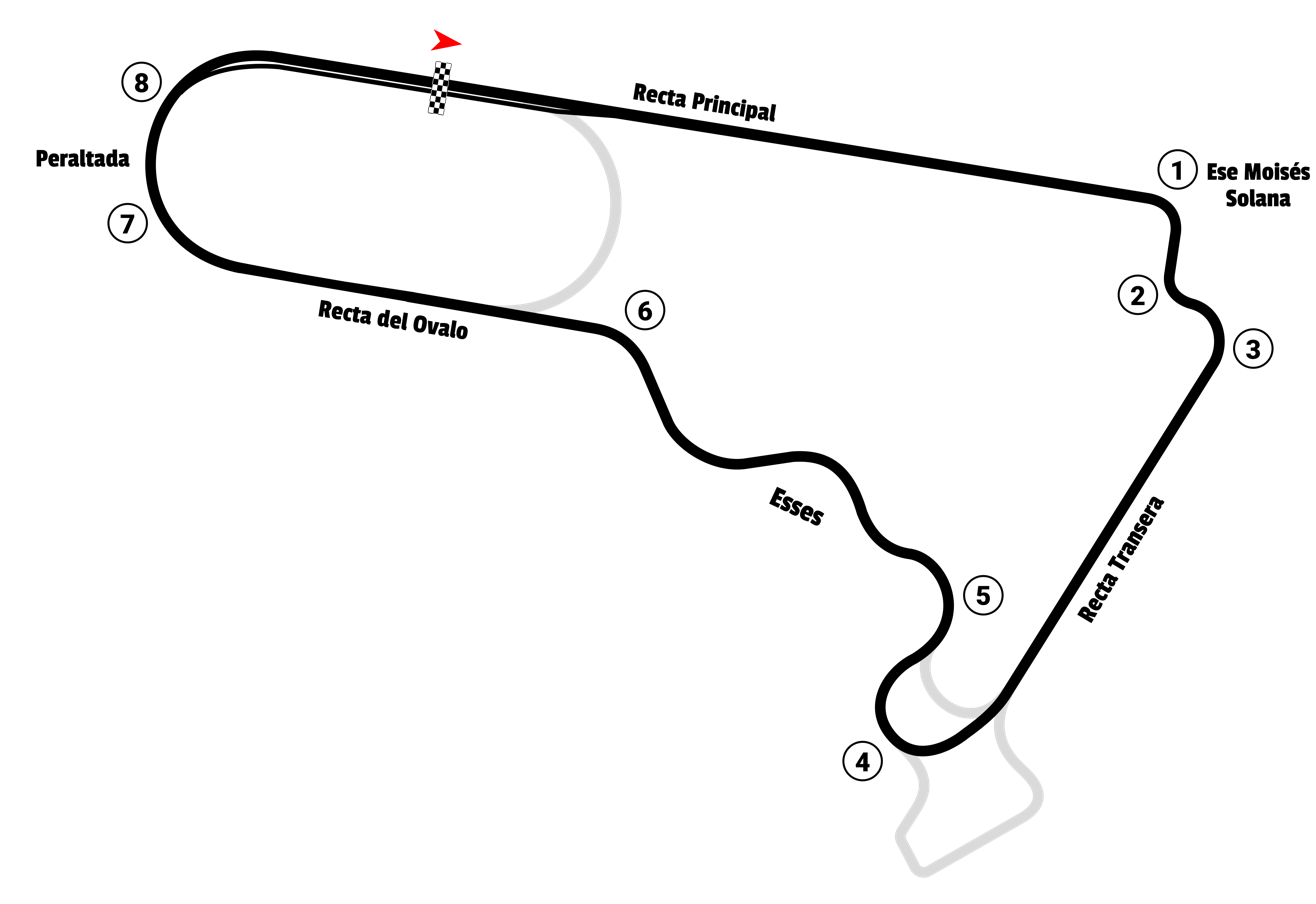
NASCAR Circuit (2007–2014)

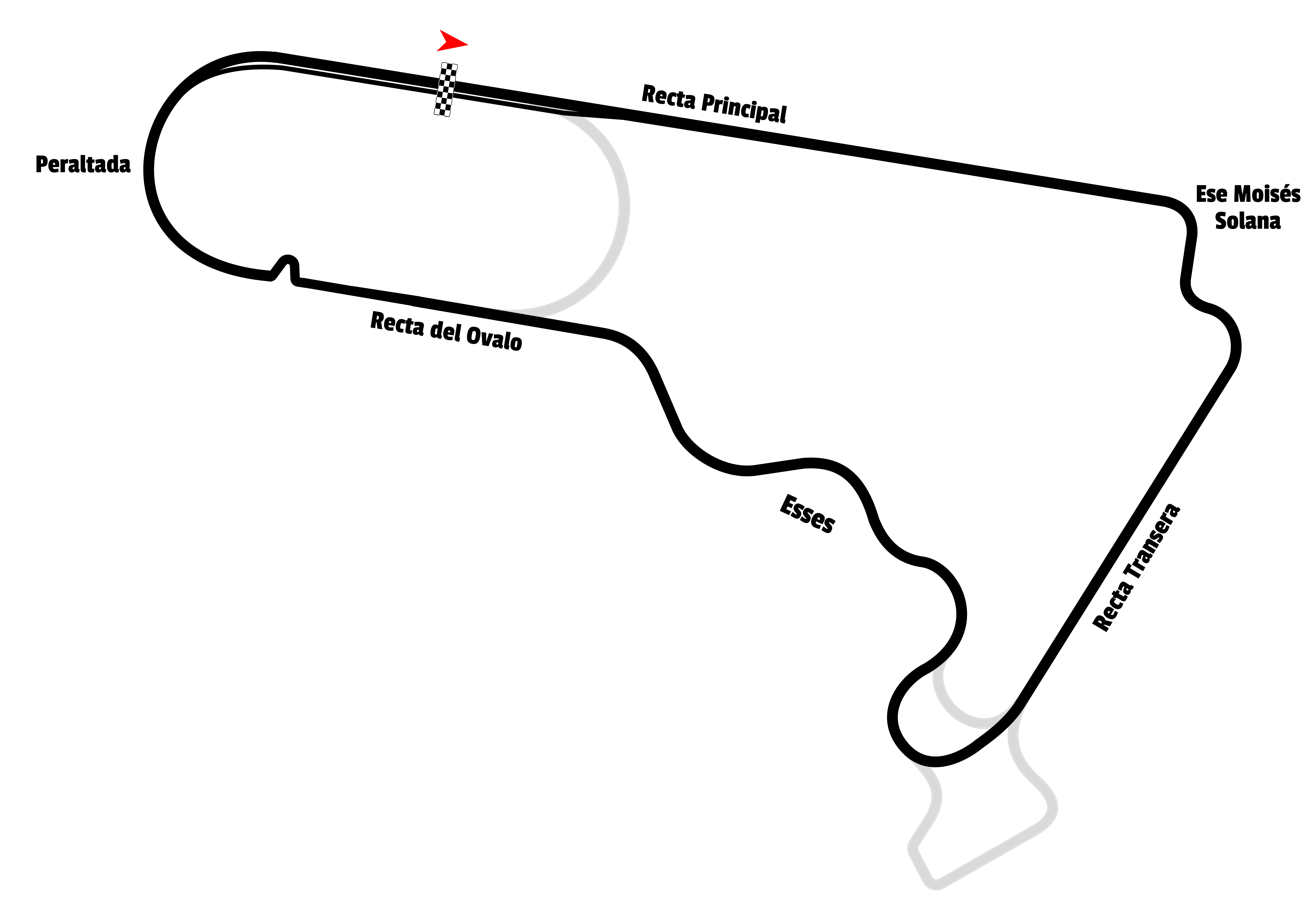
A1GP Grand Prix Circuit (2008)

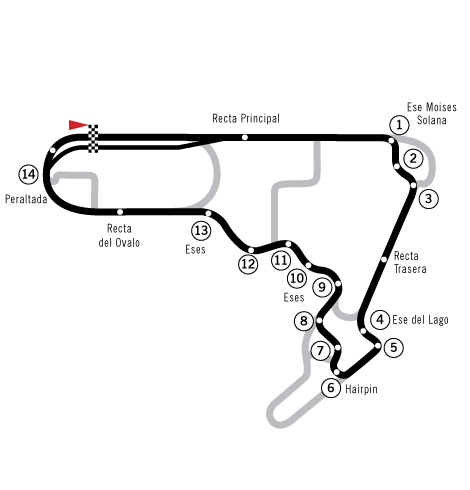
Differences between 1959–1985 layout and 1986–2014 layout

Grand Prix Circuit (2015–present)

Differences between 1986–2014 layout and 2015 layout

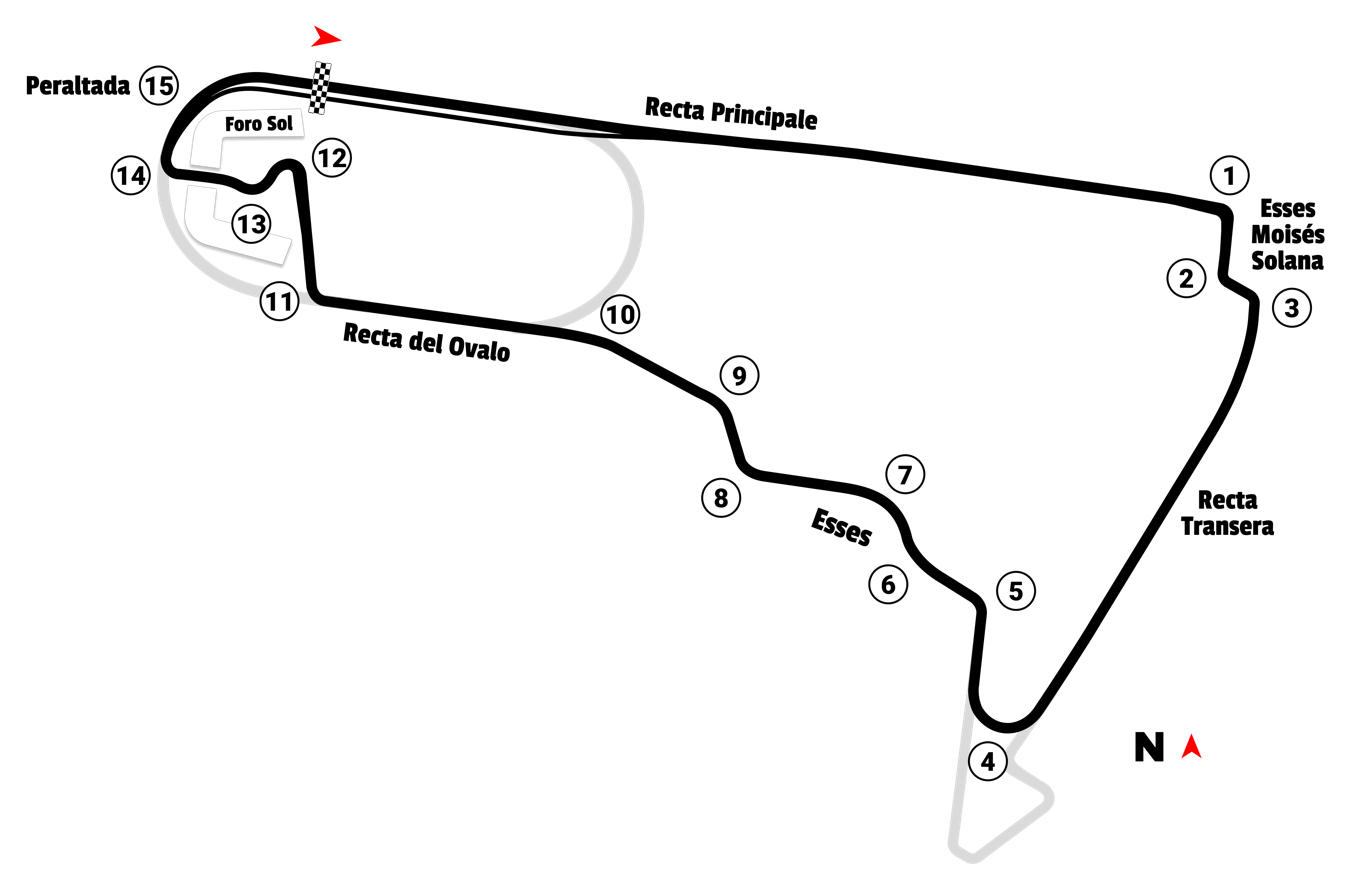
National Circuit with Foro Sol (2015–present)

Formula E Circuit (2016)

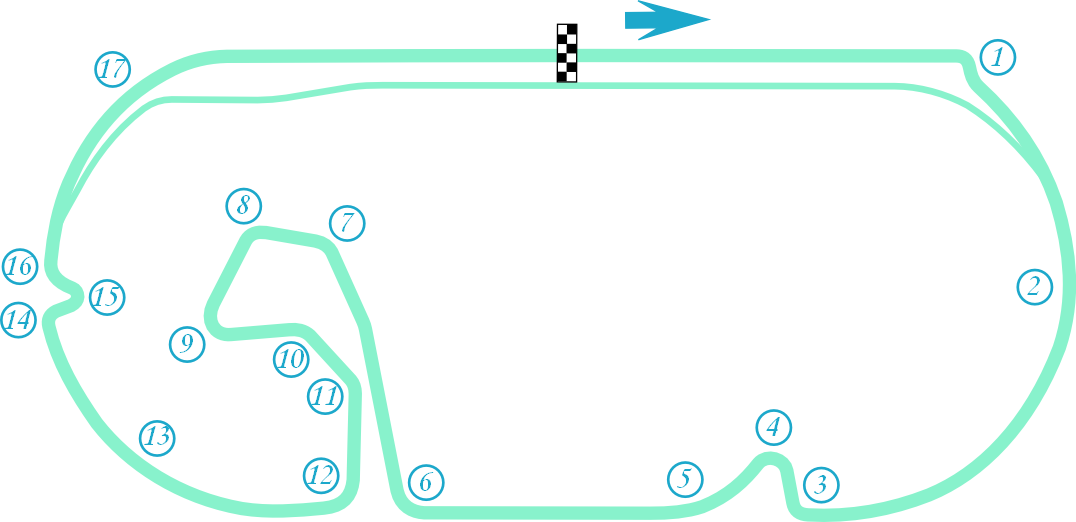
Formula E Circuit (2017–2019)

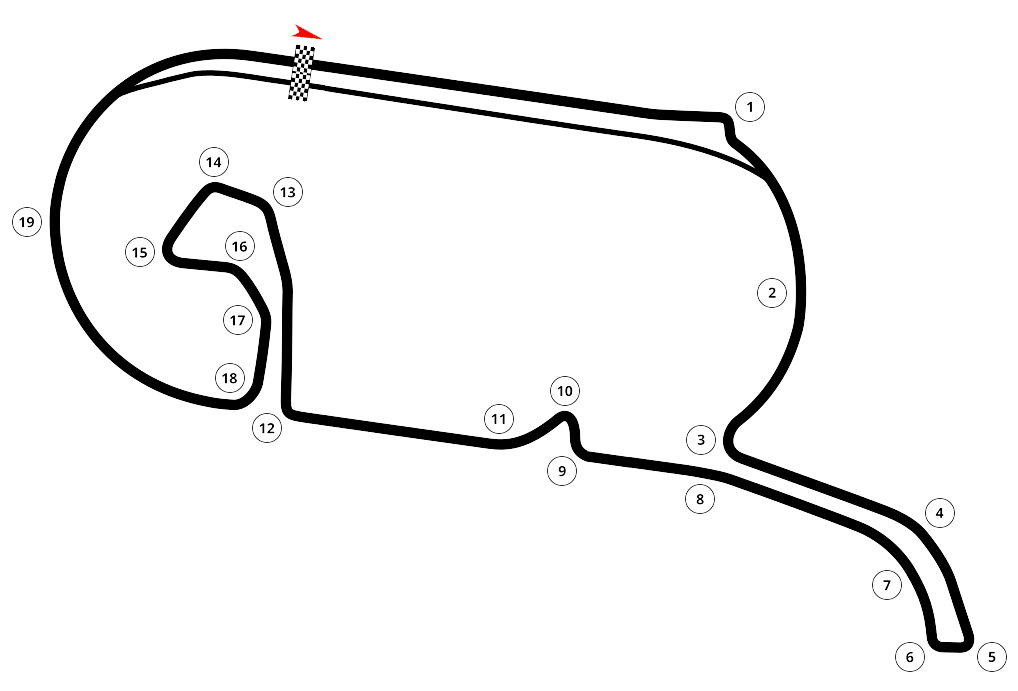
Formula E Circuit (2023–2025)

Formula E Circuit (2020–2022, 2026)

== Oval track ==
The circuit also features an oval layout due to the inclusion of a flat turn that goes from the middle of the main straight to the beginning of the backstretch of circuit. Unlike the road course, the oval is raced in counter-clockwise direction (except for the Formula E race).

The oval configuration of this Mexico City facility is arguably the most dangerous racetrack in Mexico, because of the limited visibility at the exit of turns 2 and 4. This is because the Foro Sol baseball stadium is located inside turns 1 and 2; and several trees are located inside turns 3 and 4.

During the 2006 season, two accidents occurred in the oval track during NASCAR Mexico T4 Series events, which took several drivers out of the race, with some needing hospital treatment.

The oval configuration is used at least twice a year, with two double-feature events featuring the NASCAR Mexico Series and the NASCAR Mexico T4 Series.

The oval configuration also formed the base of the FIA Formula E Championship circuit for the Mexico City ePrix; the oval was raced clockwise, but there was a chicane prior to the entrance of turn 4, with a second chicane on the backstretch, followed by a modified Foro Sol section that exited for the full Peraltada, and a third chicane midway through the Peraltada (turns 1 and 2 of the oval). FIA Formula E track design was modified by Agustin Delicado Zomeño. Starting from season 3 (2016–2017), the first chicane is removed and now it is a right-hand corner. In season 6, the track was extended and the two chicanes at the back straight and the Peraltada were removed. The track also used more of the Formula 1 layout. After turn 2 (Formula E track), the track turns left instead of right and the extended part includes a 4-turn sequence before going back to the original circuit and the stadium section. For the 2026-27 season, it is expected that the round at Mexico City will use the Grand Prix layout with a chicane at the start.

== Renamed turns ==
Before the 1986 Formula One race, the first turn (now turns 1-3) was named in honour of Moisés Solana, Mexico's third F1 driver. It is still called Ese Moisés Solana, often referred to as the "Solana Complex" in English.

In September 2002, Mexico's fourth and, then most recent, F1 driver Héctor Rebaque's achievements both in F1 and CART were recognized by renaming turn 6 of the Autodromo as Recorte Rebaque instead of the previous name of Recorte de Gran Premio.

In 2015, turn 17 was named in honour of Nigel Mansell, twice winner of the Mexican Grand Prix in 1987 and 1992 and the scene of his daring pass around the outside of Gerhard Berger in 1990.

On 20 September 2016 Adrián Fernández's achievements have been recognized by the naming of turn 12 of the Autodromo in his honour.

== Events ==
Current

- January: FIA Formula E Championship Mexico City ePrix
- March: NACAM Formula 4 Championship, TCR Mexico Series
- May: NACAM Formula 4 Championship, TCR Mexico Series
- July: NACAM Formula 4 Championship, TCR Mexico Series
- November: Formula One Mexico City Grand Prix, NASCAR Mexico Series, NACAM Formula 4 Championship, TCR Mexico Series
- December: Endurance 24

Future

- FIA Formula 2 Championship (2027)

Former

- A1 Grand Prix (2007–2008)
- Atlantic Championship (1980–1982)
- CART/Champ Car World Series
  - Gran Premio Tecate (1980–1981, 2002–2007)
- FIA World Endurance Championship
  - 6 Hours of Mexico (2016–2017)
- Fórmula de las Américas/Mexican Formula 3000 Championship (1988–1990, 1992–2001)
- Formula BMW World Final (2008)
- Formula One
  - Mexican Grand Prix (1962–1970, 1986–1992, 2015–2019)
- Fórmula Panam (2003–2005, 2007–2008, 2012–2013, 2015–2018)
- Grand Am Rolex Sports Car Series
  - Mexico City 250 (2005–2008)
- IMSA GT Championship
  - 1000 km of Mexico City (1974)
- Jaguar I-Pace eTrophy (2019–2020)
- LATAM Challenge Series (2011–2013)
- Mexican Formula Three Championship (1990–2001)
- NASCAR Cup Series
  - Viva México 250 (2025)
- NASCAR Mexico T4 Series (2005–2010)
- NASCAR Stock V6 Series (2011–2015)
- NASCAR Xfinity Series
  - The Chilango 150 (2005–2008, 2025)
- Porsche Supercup (2017–2019)
- Race of Champions (2019)
- TCR World Tour (2025)
- Trans-Am Series (1978–1979, 1991)
- United States Road Racing Championship (1968)
- World Series Formula V8 3.5 (2017)
- World Sportscar Championship
  - Trofeo Hermanos Rodríguez (1989–1991)

== Lap records ==
The official lap record for the current circuit layout is 1:17.774, set by Valtteri Bottas driving for Mercedes in the 2021 Mexico City Grand Prix, while the unofficial all-time track record is 1:14.758, set by Max Verstappen driving for Red Bull Racing in the qualifying of the 2019 Mexican Grand Prix. As of July 2026, the fastest official race lap records at the Autódromo Hermanos Rodríguez are listed as:

Category	Time	Driver	Vehicle	Event
Grand Prix Circuit with Foro Sol (2015–present): 4.304 km (2.674 mi)
Formula One	1:17.774	Valtteri Bottas	Mercedes-AMG W12 E Performance	2021 Mexico City Grand Prix
LMP1	1:25.730	Brendon Hartley	Porsche 919 Hybrid	2017 6 Hours of Mexico
Formula V8	1:32.144	Matevos Isaakyan	Dallara T12	2017 Mexico City Formula V8 round
LMP2	1:33.670	Bruno Senna	Oreca 07	2017 6 Hours of Mexico
LM GTE	1:40.212	Sam Bird	Ferrari 488 GTE	2017 6 Hours of Mexico
Porsche Carrera Cup	1:43.593	Thomas Preining	Porsche 911 (991 II) GT3 Cup	2018 2nd Mexico City Porsche Supercup round
Formula 4	1:46.087	Moisés de la Vara	Mygale M14-F4	2017 2nd Mexico City NACAM F4 round
TCR Touring Car	1:48.795	Pablo Cervantes	CUPRA León VZ TCR	2025 6th Mexico City TCR Mexico round
Grand Prix Circuit without Foro Sol (2015–present): 4.256 km (2.645 mi)
Formula 4	1:35.175	Nerea Martí	Tatuus F4-T421	2024 2nd Mexico City NACAM F4 round
Formula E Circuit (2020–2022, 2026): 2.606 km (1.619 mi)
Formula E	1:07.474	Jake Dennis	Porsche 99X Electric	2026 Mexico City ePrix
Jaguar I-Pace eTrophy	1:25.045	Cacá Bueno	Jaguar I-Pace eTrophy car	2020 Mexico City Jaguar I-Pace eTrophy round
National Circuit with Foro Sol (2015–present): 3.909 km (2.429 mi)
Formula 4	1:33.010	Axel Matus	Mygale M14-F4	2016 1st Mexico City NACAM F4 round
NASCAR Xfinity	1:33.565	Ty Gibbs	Toyota GR Supra NASCAR	2025 The Chilango 150
NASCAR Cup	1:33.782	Kyle Larson	Chevrolet Camaro ZL1	2025 Viva México 250
TCR Touring Car	1:34.842	Esteban Guerrieri	Honda Civic Type R TCR	2025 Mexico City TCR World Tour round
National Circuit without Foro Sol (2015–present): 3.850 km (2.392 mi)
TCR Touring Car	1:25.134	Gerardo Nieto	Audi RS 3 LMS TCR (2021)	2024 2nd Mexico City TCR Mexico round
Formula 4	1:30.874	Julio Rejón	Tatuus F4-T421	2026 3rd Mexico City NACAM F4 round
National Circuit with Chicane (2015–present): 3.850 km (2.392 mi)
TCR Touring Car	1:33.711	Juan Pablo Sierra	CUPRA León VZ TCR	2026 3rd Mexico City TCR Mexico round
Vintage Circuit (2020–present): 2.844 km (1.767 mi)
Formula 4	1:18.538	Julio Rejón	Mygale M14-F4	2022 1st Mexico City NACAM F4 round
Oval Circuit with Foro Sol (2015–present): 1.665 km (1.035 mi)
Formula Abarth	0:41.510	Luis Alfonso Perez	Tatuus FA010	2015 Mexico City Fórmula Panam round
Stock car racing	0:44.395	Xavi Razo (Note: Both drivers took the same lap time in this race independently.); José Luis Ramírez	Toyota Camry NASCAR; Ford Fusion NASCAR	2017 Gran Premio FedEx
Oval Circuit (1959–present): 1.609 km (1.000 mi)
Stock car racing	0:32.081	Antonio Pérez	Toyota Camry NASCAR	2015 Alcatel OneTouch 240
Formula E Circuit (2023–2025): 2.628 km (1.633 mi)
Formula E	1:12.547	Sébastien Buemi	Jaguar I-Type 7	2025 Mexico City ePrix
Original Formula E Circuit (2017–2019): 2.093 km (1.301 mi)
Formula E	1:01.112	Pascal Wehrlein	Mahindra M5Electro	2019 Mexico City ePrix
Jaguar I-Pace eTrophy	1:15.516	Bryan Sellers	Jaguar I-Pace eTrophy (racecar)	2019 Mexico City Jaguar I-Pace eTrophy round
Original Formula E Circuit (2016): 2.092 km (1.300 mi)
Formula E	1:04.569	Nico Prost	Renault Z.E 15	2016 Mexico City ePrix
Modified Grand Prix Circuit: 4.421 km (2.747 mi) (1986–2014)
Formula One	1:16.788	Nigel Mansell	Williams FW14	1991 Mexican Grand Prix
Group C	1:21.611	Michael Schumacher	Mercedes-Benz C291	1991 430 km of Mexico City
Formula Three	1:21.753	Javier Pelayo	Reynard 933	1999 2nd Monterrey Mexican F3 round
A1GP	1:27.534	Salvador Durán	Lola A1GP	2007 Mexico City A1GP round
Group C2	1:31.929	Chris Hodgetts	Spice SE87C	1989 480 km of Mexico
Trans-Am	1:39.030	Darin Brassfield	Oldsmobile Cutlass Trans-Am	1991 Mexico City Trans-Am round
National Circuit (1986–2014): 4.000 km (2.485 mi)
Indy Lights	1:15.386	Oswaldo Negri Jr.	Lola T96/20	2000 2nd Mexico City Fórmula de las Américas round
Formula 3000	1:16.005	Mario Domínguez	Lola T96/70	1997 2nd Mexico City Mexican F3000 round
Formula Three	1:16.751	Waldemar Coronas	Reynard 933	1997 1st Mexico City Mexican F3 round
Formula Abarth	1:18.287	Gerardo Nieto	Tatuus FA010	2012 Mexico City Panam GP round
NASCAR Circuit (2007-2014): 4.053 km (2.518 mi)
Daytona Prototype	1:20.521	Alex Gurney	Riley Mk XX	2008 Mexico City 250
A1GP Grand Prix Circuit (NASCAR Circuit with chicane) (2008): 4.084 km (2.538 mi)
A1GP	1:21.417	Oliver Jarvis	Lola A1GP	2008 Mexico City A1GP round
Champ Car Grand Prix Circuit (Modified Grand Prix Circuit with chicane) (2006–2007): 4.463 km (2.773 mi)
Champ Car	1:24.713	Robert Doornbos	Panoz DP01	2007 Gran Premio Tecate
NASCAR Circuit (2005–2006): 4.052 km (2.518 mi)
Daytona Prototype	1:22.931	Scott Pruett	Riley Mk XI	2006 Mexico City 400 km
CART/Champ Car Grand Prix Circuit (Modified Grand Prix Circuit with Foro Sol) (2002–2005): 4.484 km (2.786 mi)
CART	1:27.248	Shinji Nakano	Lola B02/00	2002 Gran Premio Telmex-Gigante
Champ Car	1:28.479	Justin Wilson	Lola B02/00	2005 Gran Premio Telmex/Tecate
Daytona Prototype	1:45.331	Max Angelelli	Riley Mk XI	2005 Mexico City 250
Formula Renault 2.0	1:48.798	Hugo Oliveras	Tatuus FR2000	2004 Mexico City Formula Renault 2000 America round
Grand Touring	1:54.099	Bill Auberlen	BMW M3 (E46) GTR	2005 Mexico City 250
Original Grand Prix Circuit (1959–1985): 5.000 km (3.107 mi)
Formula One	1:43.050	Jacky Ickx	Brabham BT26A	1969 Mexican Grand Prix
Group 4	1:48.910	Peter Revson	Lola T70	1968 Mexico City USRRC round
Original Short Circuit (1959–1985): 3.991 km (2.480 mi)
Formula Atlantic	1:17.631	Norm Hunter	Ralt RT4	1982 Mexico City Formula Atlantic round

== The baseball stadium ==
The Autódromo includes a baseball stadium inside turn 14 (Peraltada). The stadium, called Estadio GNP Seguros since 2024 and formerly known as Foro Sol, was home to the Diablos Rojos del México and also hosts music concerts. Some of the artists who played there include Iron Maiden, Paul McCartney, Britney Spears, Metallica, Pink Floyd, Santana, Lady Gaga, The Rolling Stones, Madonna, Taylor Swift, Stone Temple Pilots, Nine Inch Nails, Shakira, U2, Radiohead, and Guns N' Roses. The Diablos Rojos later left the then-called Foro Sol in order to build a new baseball stadium named Estadio Alfredo Harp Helú, which was later completed on 23 March 2019. Unlike Estadio GNP, it was built inside of the race track near turns 1 and 3.
