= Parque Tangamanga =

Public parks in San Luis Potosí, Mexico

Parque Tangamanga I and II are public parks in the city of San Luis Potosí, Mexico.

== History ==
Parque Tangamanga I was inaugurated in 1983 in the former Hacienda La Tenería. Parque Tangamanga II was the old airport of the city, and was turned into a park in 1985.

== Parque Tangamanga I ==
Parque Tangamanga I is located in the south of the city. After Bosque de Chapultepec, it is the second largest urban park in Mexico at 411 hectares (1,020 acres).

=== Facilities ===
- Ecomuseo and restaurant (in the former "casco"—main house—of the "La Tenería Hacienda")
- Sporting facilities (soccer, baseball, softball, football, basketball, tennis, motocross, bicicross, archery, scale planes aerodrome, gym, jogging)
- Carlos Amador Movie-Theatre
- "Splash" Watering Place
- Planetarium (Clausurado)
- Teatro de la Ciudad (City Theatre)
- "El Laberinto" Interactive Museum

== Parque Tangamanga II ==
Autódromo San Luis 400
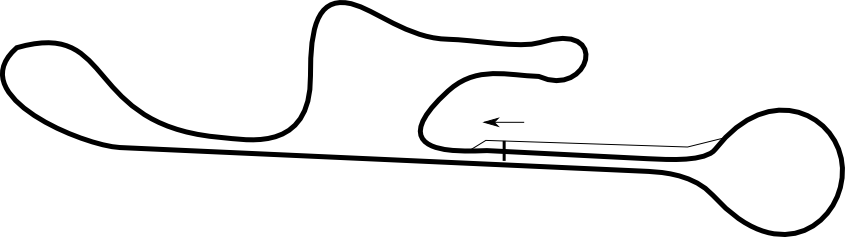
- Layout of San Luis 400
- Location: San Luis Potosí, Mexico
- Coordinates: 22°10′56.6″N 100°59′36.6″W
- Major events: Former: NACAM Formula 4 Championship (2016–2017, 2019); Fórmula Panam (2003–2005, 2016); LATAM Challenge Series (2008–2013); Desafío Corona (2004)

Full Circuit
- Surface: Asphalt
- Length: 2.300 km (1.429 miles)
- Turns: 13
- Race lap record: 1:06.488 ( (Mexico) Hugo Rangel, Tatuus FA010, 2016, Formula Abarth)

Parque Tangamanga II is located in the north of the city.

=== Facilities ===
==== Canal 9 ====
A local television station, Canal 9, has been located in the park since 2002.

==== Autódromo San Luis 400 ====
The Autódromo is a permanent motor racing circuit located on the old airport runway. The track is 2,300 km (1,400 mi) long. It has been the venue for many national racing events, including Desafío Corona, Copa Pirelli, LATAM Challenge Series, Super Copa Telcel and CARreras.

Lap records

As of March 2019, the fastest official race lap records at the Autódromo San Luis 400 are listed as:

Category	Time	Driver	Vehicle	Event
Full Circuit: 2.300 km
Formula Abarth	1:06.488	Hugo Rangel	Tatuus FA010	2016 San Luis Potosi Fórmula Panam round
Formula Renault 2.0	1:13.150	Homero Richards	Tatuus FR2000 Renault	2008 San Luis Potosi LATAM Challenge round
Formula Vee	1:13.401	Francisco Cerullo	Tatuus FR2000 Volkswagen	2011 San Luis Potosi LATAM Challenge round
Formula 4	1:13.796	Axel Matus	Mygale M14-F4	2016 San Luis Potosi NACAM F4 round
Stock car racing	1:29.755	Rogelio López	Pontiac Grand Am	2004 2nd San Luis Potosi Desafío Corona round
Short Circuit: ?? km
Formula 4	0:56.207	Manuel Sulaimán	Mygale M14-F4	2019 San Luis Potosi NACAM F4 round
Formula Vee	1:04.645	Francisco Cerullo	Tatuus FR2000 Volkswagen	2013 San Luis Potosi LATAM Challenge round
