= Autódromo Monterrey =

Motorsport circuit in Monterrey, Mexico

- Autódromo Monterrey Full Circuit (1986–present)
- Location: Apodaca, Nuevo León, Mexico
- Coordinates: 25°51′22″N 100°13′02″W
- Operator: DIPSA
- Opened: 1970
- Former names: Autódromo Apodaca
- Major events: Current: NASCAR Mexico Series; Regia 200 (2004–2014, 2017–2019, 2021–present); Former: NACAM Formula 4 Championship (2016–2020); Fórmula Panam (2005, 2013, 2015–2017); LATAM Challenge Series (2008–2011, 2013); Mexican F3 (1990–1997, 1999–2001)

Full Circuit (1986–present)
- Surface: Asphalt
- Length: 3.200 km (1.988 mi)
- Turns: 19
- Race lap record: 1:05.161 ( (Argentina) Waldemar Coronas, Lola T96/20, 2000, Indy Lights)

El Frijol Oval (1970–present)
- Surface: Asphalt
- Length: 1.600 km (0.994 mi)
- Turns: 5
- Race lap record: 0:35.431 ( (Mexico) Abraham Calderón, Ford Fusion NASCAR, 2022, Stock car racing)

Original Circuit (1970–1985)
- Surface: Asphalt
- Length: 3.090 km (1.920 mi)
- Turns: 12

The Autódromo Monterrey is a racetrack in Apodaca, Nuevo León, Mexico, in the Monterrey metropolitan area. The track currently is operated by DIPSA and host races for NASCAR México, drag racing, karting and Volks races.

== History ==
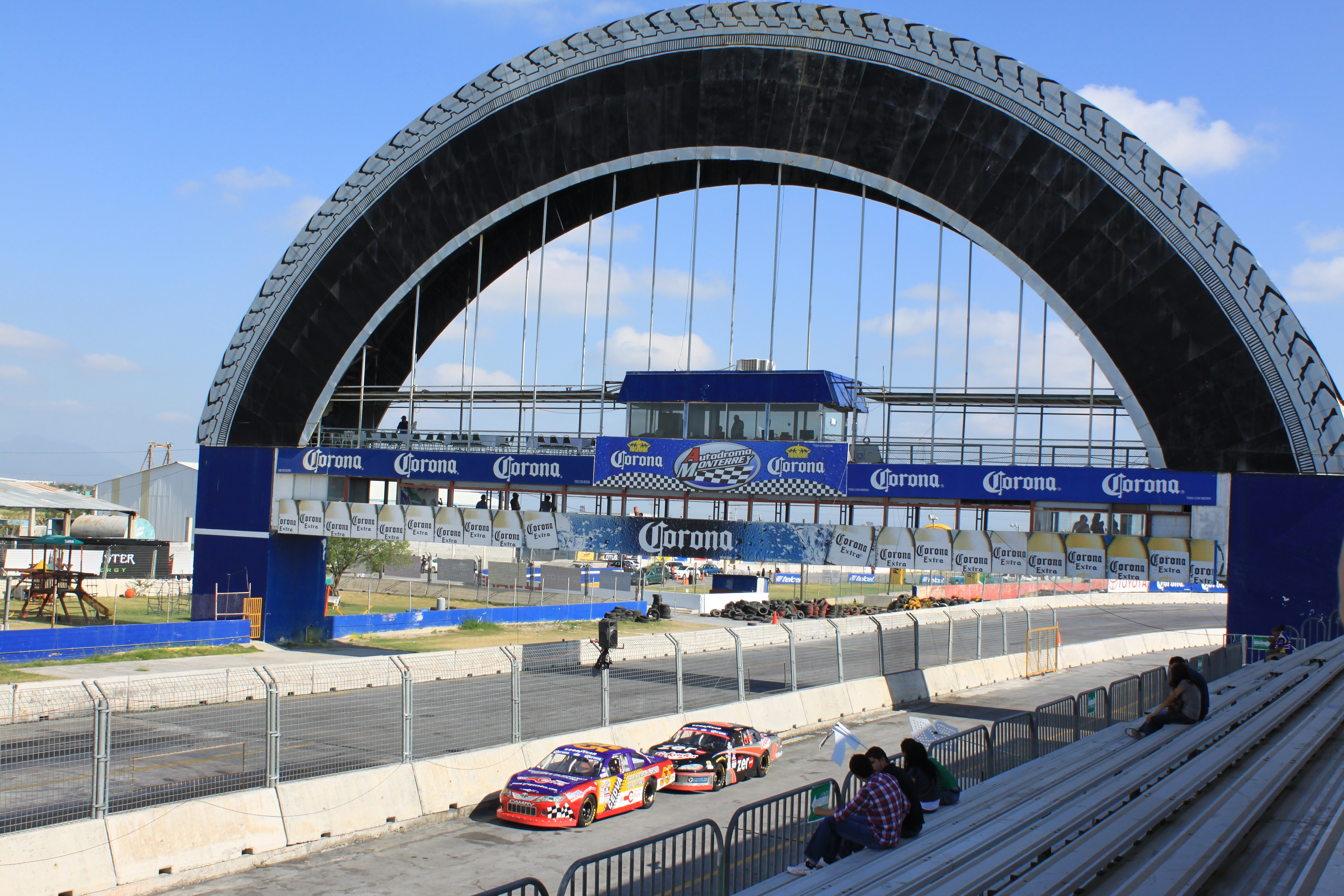
Bridge in the start line

The track is located front the Del Norte International Airport. The Autódromo was inaugurated in 1970 by Filiberto Jiménez. In the 1970s, 500 km of Monterrey was the main event in this circuit.

== Layout ==
The track has a long straight (used for drag racing), followed by a chicane (turn 1) which takes the drivers to a hairpin turn. Turn 6 is another chicane, together with T1 was added later. Originally the last curve was a banking turn, now used in the short layout. In the long version there is a bypass that conducts to the second part of this turn.

There is a second course called El Frijol for its bean shape. This is a Dogleg oval 1.600 km (0.994 mi) in length. In this course the first turn is flat and the second is a banking turn.

== Races ==
=== Formula K ===
Season	Date	Winner
1988	June 19	(Mexico) César Tiberio Jiménez
1989	July 8	(Mexico) Carlos Guerrero

=== Formula 2 ===
Season	Date	Winner
1990	June 22	(Mexico) Carlos Guerrero
1992	May 17	(Mexico) Carlos Guerrero
1993	May 30	(Mexico) Marco Magaña
1994	May 22	(Mexico) Gerardo Martínez
1995	May 22	(Brazil) José Cordova
1997	September 3	(Mexico) Ricardo Pérez de Lara

=== NASCAR México ===
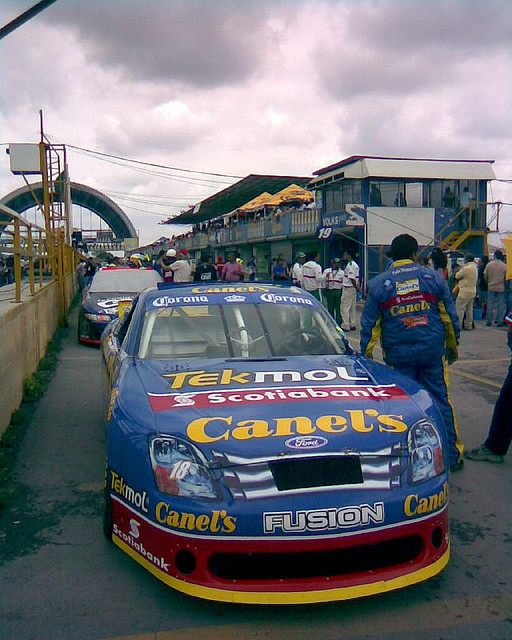
Rafael Martínez in a NASCAR Corona Series event

Season	Date	Winner	Track	Length (km)
2004	August 1	(Mexico) César Tiberio Jiménez	Short	144
2005	June 26	(Mexico) Rogelio López	Long	160
2005	October 22	(Mexico) Rogelio López	Long	154
2006	September 3	(Mexico) Carlos Pardo	Long	147
2007	May 20	(Mexico) Rafael Martínez	Short	120
2007	September 2	(Mexico) Antonio Pérez	Short	225
2008	June 29	(Mexico) Antonio Pérez	Short	119
2009	September 20	(Mexico) Germán Quiroga	Short	178
2010	August 22	(Mexico) Rubén Rovelo	Long	202
2011	March 20	(Mexico) Patrick Goeters	Long	198
2011	August 7	(Mexico) Rafael Martinez	Short	180
2012	March 25	(Mexico) Ruben Rovelo	Long	213
2012	September 30	(Mexico) Jorge Goeters	Short	241
2013	June 30	(Mexico) Daniel Suárez	Long	208
2014	April 27	(Mexico) Daniel Suárez	Short	250
2017	March 26	(Mexico) Ruben Rovelo	Long	94

== Lap records ==
As of March 2024, the fastest official race lap records at the Autódromo Monterrey are listed as:

Category	Time	Driver	Vehicle	Event
Full Circuit (1986–present): 3.200 km (1.988 mi)
Indy Lights	1:05.161	Waldemar Coronas	Lola T96/20	2000 1st Monterrey Fórmula de las Américas round
Stock car racing	1:05.912	Gerardo Nieto	Chevrolet Camaro NASCAR	2021 Monterrey NASCAR Mexico round
Formula Abarth	1:07.815	Pablo Sánchez	Tatuus FA010	2013 Monterrey Fórmula Panam round
Formula 3000	1:07.958	Mario Domínguez	Lola T96/70	1997 Monterrey Mexican F3000 round
Formula Three	1:08.861	Eduardo Troconis	Reynard 933	1999 2nd Monterrey Mexican F3 round
Formula Renault 2.0	1:09.781	Rudy Camarillo	Tatuus FR2000	2011 Monterrey LATAM Challenge round
Formula 4	1:10.887	Axel Matus	Mygale M14-F4	2016 Monterrey NACAM F4 round
TCR Touring Car	1:12.530	Andrés Orea Jr.	Hyundai Elantra N TCR	2024 Monterrey TCR Mexico Endurance round
El Frijol Oval (1970–present): 1.600 km (0.994 mi)
Stock car racing	0:35.431	Abraham Calderón	Ford Fusion NASCAR	2022 Gran Premio Monterrey
Indy Lights	0:36.192	Waldemar Coronas	Lola T96/20	2000 2nd Monterrey Fórmula de las Américas round
Formula Three	0:39.689	José Antonio Ramos	Reynard 933	2000 2nd Monterrey Mexican F3 round

== Fatalities ==
American racer Ron Sheldon died in the 1971 Mexico 1000.

In 1993, running in Formula 2, Marco Magaña was hit by a rock in the head. He died instantaneously. A spectator died in the same accident.

In the inaugural season of Desafío Corona, now NASCAR Corona Series, Marcelo Nuñez avoiding an incident hit the wall in turn 1 creating a cloud of dust blocking the view of incoming drivers. Then, Rafael Vallina hit Nuñez's car in the right side. Nuñez had several injuries including perforation of lung, and died 8 days later in the Muguerza hospital.
