= Circuito Centro Dinámico Pegaso =

Motorsport venue in Mexico

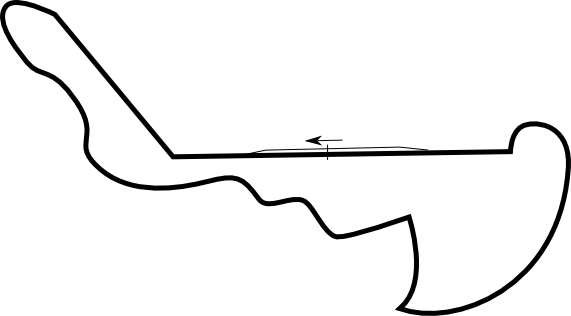
- Location: Toluca, State of Mexico
- Coordinates: 19°22′02″N 99°33′24″W
- Major events: Former: NACAM Formula 4 Championship (2016–2017); LATAM Challenge Series (2011–2012)
- Surface: Asphalt
- Length: 2.070 km (1.286 miles)
- Turns: 14
- Race lap record: 0:57.493 ( (Mexico) Pato O'Ward, Mygale M14-F4, 2016, F4)

Circuito Centro Dinámico Pegaso is a motorsport venue located in Toluca, Mexico. In 2016, the circuit met all FIA requirements and obtained homologation to host a round of the NACAM Formula 4 Championship, thus becoming an international track endorsed by FIA in the State of Mexico.

== Layout ==
Circuito Centro Dinámico Pegaso has a length of 2.070 km (1.286 mi) and has 14 turns in its normal layout, since the circuit has different combinations with different curves and straights.
