= 2016–17 NACAM Formula 4 Championship =

Motor racing competition

The 2016–17 NACAM Formula 4 Championship season was the second season of the NACAM Formula 4 Championship. It began on 24 September 2016 at the Circuit of the Americas in Austin, Texas and ended on 18 June 2017 at the Autódromo Hermanos Rodríguez in Mexico City after eight triple-header rounds.

== Teams and drivers ==
Team	No.	Driver	Class	Rounds
(Mexico) Telcel RPL Racing	2	(Mexico) José Sierra		All
(Mexico) Telcel RPL Racing	33	(Uruguay) Facundo Garese		6
(Mexico) Telcel RPL Racing	33	(Mexico) Ricardo Pérez		7–8
(Mexico) Telcel RPL Racing	58	(Mexico) Luis Alfonso Pérez		1–5
(Mexico) Telcel RPL Racing	79	(Colombia) Santiago Lozano		1–5, 8
(Mexico) Ram Racing	4	(Guyana) Calvin Ming		All
(Mexico) Ram Racing	7	(Mexico) Andrés Gutiérrez		2
(Mexico) Ram Racing	8	(Mexico) Manuel Sulaimán	R	1, 3–6
(Mexico) Ram Racing	8	(Mexico) Pipo Villa		7
(Mexico) Ram Racing	10	(Mexico) Jorge Herrera	R	1–3, 8
(Mexico) Ram Racing	17	(Dominican Republic) Michael Santos	R	8
(Mexico) MomoF4 Team	5	(Mexico) Alexandra Mohnhaupt		All
(Mexico) MomoF4 Team	6	(Mexico) Moisés de la Vara		1
(Mexico) MomoF4 Team	7	(Mexico) Andrés Gutiérrez		1
(Mexico) MomoF4 Team	45	(Argentina) Baltazar Leguizamón		2
(Mexico) MomoF4 Team	57	(Mexico) Giancarlo Vecchi		2–3
(Mexico) MomoF4 Team	57	(Republic of Ireland) Charlie Eastwood	G	5
(Mexico) MomoF4 Team	66	(Mexico) Gustavo Jiménez Pons		4, 8
(Mexico) MomoF4 Team	88	(Colombia) Juan José Díaz	R	8
(Mexico) Scuderia Martiga EG	6	(Mexico) Moisés de la Vara		2–8
(Mexico) Scuderia Martiga EG	11	(United States) Kory Enders		8
(Mexico) Scuderia Martiga EG	16	(Mexico) Alejandro Berumen	R	1–5
(Mexico) Scuderia Martiga EG	18	(Mexico) Alexis Carreño		All
(Mexico) Scuderia Martiga EG	21	(Mexico) Marcelo García	R	6
(Mexico) Scuderia Martiga EG	21	(Mexico) David Martínez		7
(Mexico) Easy-Shop.com Racing	9	(Mexico) Daniel Forcadell		1, 3–8
(Mexico) Easy-Shop.com Racing	17	(Mexico) José Manuel Vilalta		2
(Mexico) Marespi Racing	20	(Mexico) Sergio Martínez		2, 5
(Panama) J Bernal Racing	26	(Australia) Luis Leeds		2
(Panama) J Bernal Racing	31	(Panama) Marcus Vario	R	1
(Panama) J Bernal Racing	57	(Mexico) Giancarlo Vecchi		6
(Mexico) APYCSA Racing	35	(Mexico) Jorge Abed		1–2
(Mexico) APYCSA Racing	74	(Brazil) Enzo Fittipaldi	R	2
(Mexico) APYCSA Racing	85	(Mexico) Álex Servín	R	3–8
(Mexico) CEDVA Racing	55	(Mexico) Jorge Contreras		2
(Mexico) Rached Racing	71	(Mexico) Samira Rached		8

Icon	Class
R	Rookie
G	Guest drivers ineligible to score points

== Race calendar and results ==
The calendar was published on 28 July 2015. For the first time, the series expanded outside Mexico, hosting its opening round at the Circuit of the Americas in Austin. The series also hosted a full-championship round in support of the 2016 Mexican GP round, as opposed to the exhibition round held the previous season, and also extended its territory to Southeastern Mexico by holding two back-to-back rounds in the states of Yucatán and Quintana Roo.

A mid-season revision of the calendar was made after the Southeastern events had taken place.

Round		Circuit	Date	Pole position	Fastest lap	Winning driver	Winning team	Rookie winner
2016
1	R1	(United States) Circuit of the Americas (Austin, Texas)	25 September	(Mexico) José Sierra	(Mexico) Andrés Gutiérrez	(Mexico) José Sierra	(Mexico) Telcel RPL Racing	(Mexico) Jorge Herrera
1	R2	(United States) Circuit of the Americas (Austin, Texas)	25 September		(Mexico) Manuel Sulaimán	(Mexico) Andrés Gutiérrez	(Mexico) MomoF4 Team	(Mexico) Jorge Herrera
1	R3	(United States) Circuit of the Americas (Austin, Texas)	25 September	(Mexico) Alexis Carreño	(Mexico) Andrés Gutiérrez	(Mexico) Andrés Gutiérrez	(Mexico) MomoF4 Team	(Mexico) Manuel Sulaimán
2	R1	Autódromo Hermanos Rodríguez (Mexico City)	29 October	(Mexico) Andrés Gutiérrez	(Mexico) Alexis Carreño	(Mexico) Alexis Carreño	(Mexico) Scuderia Martiga EG	(Mexico) Alejandro Berumen
2	R2	Autódromo Hermanos Rodríguez (Mexico City)	30 October		(Mexico) José Sierra	(Guyana) Calvin Ming	(Mexico) Ram Racing	(Brazil) Enzo Fittipaldi
3	R1	(Mexico) Autódromo Miguel E. Abed (Amozoc, Puebla)	3 December	(Mexico) José Sierra	(Mexico) José Sierra	(Mexico) José Sierra	(Mexico) Telcel RPL Racing	(Mexico) Manuel Sulaimán
3	R2	(Mexico) Autódromo Miguel E. Abed (Amozoc, Puebla)	4 December		(Mexico) José Sierra	(Mexico) Luis Alfonso Pérez	(Mexico) Telcel RPL Racing	(Mexico) Manuel Sulaimán
3	R3	(Mexico) Autódromo Miguel E. Abed (Amozoc, Puebla)	4 December	(Mexico) José Sierra	(Mexico) Giancarlo Vecchi	(Mexico) Giancarlo Vecchi	(Mexico) MomoF4 Team	(Mexico) Manuel Sulaimán
2017
4	R1	(Mexico) Autódromo Emerson Fittipaldi (Mérida, Yucatán)	28 January	(Guyana) Calvin Ming	(Guyana) Calvin Ming	(Guyana) Calvin Ming	(Mexico) Ram Racing	(Mexico) Manuel Sulaimán
4	R2	(Mexico) Autódromo Emerson Fittipaldi (Mérida, Yucatán)	29 January		(Mexico) Moisés de la Vara	(Guyana) Calvin Ming	(Mexico) Ram Racing	(Mexico) Manuel Sulaimán
4	R3	(Mexico) Autódromo Emerson Fittipaldi (Mérida, Yucatán)	29 January	(Guyana) Calvin Ming	(Mexico) Luis Alfonso Pérez	(Mexico) José Sierra	(Mexico) Telcel RPL Racing	(Mexico) Alejandro Berumen
5	R1	(Mexico) Autódromo Internacional de Cancún (Cancún, Quintana Roo)	4 February	(Guyana) Calvin Ming	(Guyana) Calvin Ming	(Guyana) Calvin Ming	(Mexico) Ram Racing	(Mexico) Manuel Sulaimán
5	R2	(Mexico) Autódromo Internacional de Cancún (Cancún, Quintana Roo)	5 February		(Mexico) Manuel Sulaimán	(Mexico) José Sierra	(Mexico) Telcel RPL Racing	(Mexico) Manuel Sulaimán
5	R3	(Mexico) Autódromo Internacional de Cancún (Cancún, Quintana Roo)	5 February	(Guyana) Calvin Ming	(Guyana) Calvin Ming	(Mexico) Moisés de la Vara	(Mexico) Scuderia Martiga EG	(Mexico) Manuel Sulaimán
6	R1	(Mexico) Autódromo de Monterrey (Apodaca, Nuevo León)	6 May	(Mexico) Moisés de la Vara	(Mexico) Moisés de la Vara	(Guyana) Calvin Ming	(Mexico) Ram Racing	(Mexico) Manuel Sulaimán
6	R2	(Mexico) Autódromo de Monterrey (Apodaca, Nuevo León)	7 May		(Uruguay) Facundo Garese	(Uruguay) Facundo Garese	(Mexico) Telcel RPL Racing	no finishers
6	R3	(Mexico) Autódromo de Monterrey (Apodaca, Nuevo León)	7 May	(Mexico) Moisés de la Vara	(Mexico) José Sierra	(Mexico) Moisés de la Vara	(Mexico) Scuderia Martiga EG	(Mexico) Manuel Sulaimán
7	R1	(Mexico) Parque Tangamanga (San Luis Potosí, San Luis Potosí)	20 May	(Guyana) Calvin Ming	(Guyana) Calvin Ming	(Guyana) Calvin Ming	(Mexico) Ram Racing	(Mexico) Álex Servín
7	R2	(Mexico) Parque Tangamanga (San Luis Potosí, San Luis Potosí)	21 May		(Mexico) Alexis Carreño	(Mexico) Alexis Carreño	(Mexico) Scuderia Martiga EG	no finishers
7	R3	(Mexico) Parque Tangamanga (San Luis Potosí, San Luis Potosí)	21 May	(Guyana) Calvin Ming	(Guyana) Calvin Ming	(Guyana) Calvin Ming	(Mexico) Ram Racing	(Mexico) Álex Servín
8	R1	Autódromo Hermanos Rodríguez (Mexico City)	17 June	(Mexico) José Sierra	(Mexico) Moisés de la Vara	(Mexico) Moisés de la Vara	(Mexico) Scuderia Martiga EG	(Colombia) Juan José Díaz
8	R2	Autódromo Hermanos Rodríguez (Mexico City)	18 June		(Colombia) Santiago Lozano	(Guyana) Calvin Ming	(Mexico) Ram Racing	(Dominican Republic) Michael Santos
8	R3	Autódromo Hermanos Rodríguez (Mexico City)	18 June	(Mexico) Moisés de la Vara	(Mexico) Moisés de la Vara	(Mexico) José Sierra	(Mexico) Telcel RPL Racing	(Colombia) Juan José Díaz

== Championship standings ==
Points were awarded to the top 10 classified finishers in each race. For this season, the series changed its scoring system following the unified FIA F4 rulebook.

Position	**1st**	**2nd**	**3rd**	**4th**	**5th**	**6th**	**7th**	**8th**	**9th**	**10th**
Points	25	18	15	12	10	8	6	4	2	1

=== Drivers' Championship ===
Pos	Driver	COTA (United States)			AHR1 (Mexico)		PUE (Mexico)			MER (Mexico)			CAN (Mexico)			MTY (Mexico)			SLP (Mexico)			AHR2 (Mexico)			Pts
Pos	Driver	R1	R2	R3	R1	R2	R1	R2	R3	R1	R2	R3	R1	R2	R3	R1	R2	R3	R1	R2	R3	R1	R2	R3	Pts
1	(Guyana) Calvin Ming	3	3	6	3	1	3	3	2	**1**	1	**Ret**	**1**	2	**2**	1	2	9	**1**	2	**1**	4	1	4	399
2	(Mexico) José Sierra	**1**	Ret	3	2	2	**1**	10	**5**	4	2	1	2	1	4	4	3	5	4	4	4	**3**	10	1	336
3	(Mexico) Alexis Carreño	6	8	**2**	1	3	7	5	6	7	3	9	6	9	9	3	6	2	3	1	3	5	2	10	254
4	(Mexico) Moisés de la Vara	7	6	4	8	Ret	4	9	9	5	5	2	7	7	1	**8**	7	**1**	2	3	2	1	4	**8**	248
5	(Mexico) Luis Alfonso Pérez	9	Ret	9	4	4	5	1	3	6	4	3	3	4	3										155
6	(Mexico) Manuel Sulaimán	10	5	5			6	2	4	2	6	Ret	4	5	5	2	8	4							151
7	(Mexico) Alexandra Mohnhaupt	8	7	8	6	Ret	8	7	Ret	Ret	9	5	8	6	7	9	4	7	6	5	5	6	3	7	141
8	(Colombia) Santiago Lozano	5	2	Ret	Ret	Ret	9	DNS	8	3	8	4	9	3	6							2	5	3	133
9	(Mexico) Giancarlo Vecchi				Ret	5	2	4	1							5	5	6							93
10	(Mexico) Andrés Gutiérrez	2	1	1	**Ret**	10																			69
11	(Mexico) Jorge Herrera	4	4	7	Ret	Ret	10	6	7													Ret	11	9	47
12	(Mexico) Daniel Forcadell	11	9	11			12	8	10	8	10	7	10	DNS	DNS	DNS	DNS	DNS	5	7	7	8	8	NC	47
13	(Mexico) Alejandro Berumen	12	10	Ret	9	7	11	Ret	DNS	9	7	6	5	8	8										43
14	(Mexico) Alex Servín						Ret	11	DNS	Ret	Ret	8	Ret	Ret	Ret	10	10	10	7	8	6	10	9	Ret	28
15	(Colombia) Juan José Díaz																					7	7	5	22
16	(Mexico) Sergio Martínez				5	6							Ret	10	10										20
17	(Dominican Republic) Michael Santos																					9	6	6	18
18	(Mexico) Marcelo García															7	9	8							12
19	(Mexico) José Manuel Vilalta				7	11																			6
20	(Brazil) Enzo Fittipaldi				Ret	8																			4
21	(Mexico) Jorge Contreras				10	9																			3
22	(Mexico) Gustavo Jiménez Pons									10	11	10										Ret	12	NC	2
23	(Mexico) Jorge Abed	Ret	11	10	Ret	Ret																			1
	(Panama) Marcus Vario	Ret	NC	NC																					0
	(Mexico) Samira Rached																					DNS	Ret	NC	0
	(Mexico) Ricardo Pérez																		DNS	DNS	DNS	Ret	Ret	Ret	0
	(Argentina) Baltazar Leguizamón				DNS	DNS																			0
Drivers ineligible for championship points
	(Uruguay) Facundo Garese															6	1	3							0
	(United States) Kory Enders																					DNS	Ret	2	0
	(Mexico) Pipo Villa																		DNS	Ret	Ret				0
	(Mexico) David Martínez																		DNS	Ret	Ret				0
	(Australia) Luis Leeds				Ret	Ret																			0
	(Republic of Ireland) Charlie Eastwood												DNS	Ret	DNS										0
Pos	Driver	R1	R2	R3	R1	R2	R1	R2	R3	R1	R2	R3	R1	R2	R3	R1	R2	R3	R1	R2	R3	R1	R2	R3	Pts
Pos	Driver	COTA (United States)			AHR1 (Mexico)		PUE (Mexico)			CAN (Mexico)			MER (Mexico)			MTY (Mexico)			SLP (Mexico)			AHR2 (Mexico)			Pts

Colour	Result
Gold	Winner
Silver	Second place
Bronze	Third place
Green	Points classification
Blue	Non-points classification
Blue	Non-classified finish (NC)
Purple	Retired, not classified (Ret)
Red	Did not qualify (DNQ)
Red	Did not pre-qualify (DNPQ)
Black	Disqualified (DSQ)
White	Did not start (DNS)
White	Withdrew (WD)
White	Race cancelled (C)
Blank	Did not practice (DNP)
Blank	Did not arrive (DNA)
Blank	Excluded (EX)

**Bold** – Pole
Italics – Fastest Lap

=== Rookie Cup ===
Pos	Driver	COTA (United States)			AHR1 (Mexico)		PUE (Mexico)			CAN (Mexico)			MER (Mexico)			MTY (Mexico)			SLP (Mexico)			AHR2 (Mexico)			Pts
Pos	Driver	R1	R2	R3	R1	R2	R1	R2	R3	R1	R2	R3	R1	R2	R3	R1	R2	R3	R1	R2	R3	R1	R2	R3	Pts
1	(Mexico) Manuel Sulaimán	10	5	5			6	2	4	2	6	Ret	4	5	5	2	8	4							336
2	(Mexico) Alejandro Berumen	12	10	Ret	9	8	11	Ret	DNS	9	7	6	5	8	8										203
3	(Mexico) Alex Servin						Ret	11	DNS	Ret	Ret	8	Ret	Ret	Ret	10	10	10	7	8	6	10	9	Ret	183
4	(Mexico) Jorge Herrera	4	4	7	Ret	Ret	8	6	8													Ret	11	9	149
5	(Colombia) Juan José Díaz																					7	7	5	68
6	(Dominican Republic) Michael Santos																					9	6	6	61
7	(Mexico) Marcelo García															7	9	8							54
8	(Brazil) Enzo Fittipaldi				Ret	6																			25
9	(Panama) Marcus Vario	Ret	NC	NC																					0
Pos	Driver	R1	R2	R3	R1	R2	R1	R2	R3	R1	R2	R3	R1	R2	R3	R1	R2	R3	R1	R2	R3	R1	R2	R3	Pts
Pos	Driver	COTA (United States)			AHR1 (Mexico)		PUE (Mexico)			CAN (Mexico)			MER (Mexico)			MTY (Mexico)			SLP (Mexico)			AHR2 (Mexico)			Pts

== See also ==
- Panam GP Series
- LATAM Challenge Series
