= 2017 U.S. F2000 National Championship =

Car racing competition

The 2017 Cooper Tires USF2000 Championship Powered by Mazda was the eighth season – since its revival in 2010 – of the U.S. F2000 National Championship, an open wheel auto racing series that is the first step in INDYCAR's Road to Indy ladder, operated by Andersen Promotions.

The 2017 season saw the introduction of the Tatuus USF-17 car for the Championship class. SCCA Formula Continental chassis (including the previous Van Diemen\Elan DP08) were slated to compete in National Class, but after the first weekend there were no race entries in that class and it was abandoned.

2016 Mazda Road to Indy Shootout champion Oliver Askew of Cape Motorsports came out strong, winning five of the first six races. However, he faltered at the Road America round and Dutch driver Rinus Veekay won both races there, opening the door to a tighter championship fight. Askew won two more races down the stretch while Veekay won only one more, the final race at Watkins Glen International, where Askew finished second, good enough to claim the championship. Canadian Parker Thompson won three races in the second half of the season and finished third in points. Robert Megennis won the season's first race at St. Petersburg and was the only other driver to win a race. He finished sixth in points, as he did not finish on the podium again the rest of the season.

== Drivers and teams ==
Team	No.	Driver(s)	Status	Round(s)
ArmsUp Motorsports	4	(France) Alexandre Baron		9–11, 14
ArmsUp Motorsports	7	(United States) Devin Wojcik	R	All
ArmsUp Motorsports	8	(Brazil) Bruna Tomaselli	R N	1–2
ArmsUp Motorsports	97	(Brazil) Bruna Tomaselli	R	3–8, 12–14
BN Racing	72	(United States) Zach Holden	R	14
BN Racing	79	(United States) David Malukas	R	5–8, 10–14
Cape Motorsports	2	(India) Ricky Donison	R	1–8, 10–11
Cape Motorsports	3	(United States) Oliver Askew	R	All
DEForce Racing	10	(Mexico) José Sierra	R	10–11
DEForce Racing	10	(Mexico) Andrés Gutiérrez	R	12–14
DEForce Racing	11	(United States) Kory Enders	R	All
DEForce Racing	12	(Mexico) Moisés de la Vara	R	1–13
Exclusive Autosport	90	(Canada) Parker Thompson		All
Exclusive Autosport	91	(Australia) Luke Gabin		1–6
Exclusive Autosport	92	(United States) Dev Gore	R	All
Exclusive Autosport	93	(Canada) Jayson Clunie	R	5–8, 10–14
John Cummiskey Racing	27	(United States) Colin Kaminsky	R	3–8, 12–13
John Cummiskey Racing	33	(Australia) Bayley Mickler	R	3–4
John Cummiskey Racing	34	(United States) Kris Wright	R	1–6
Kaminsky Racing	27	(United States) Colin Kaminsky	R	1–2
Newman Wachs Racing	36	(United States) Dakota Dickerson		1–6
Newman Wachs Racing	36	(United States) Darren Keane	R	7–8, 10–14
Newman Wachs Racing	37	(United States) Andre Castro	R	1–4
Newman Wachs Racing	37	(United States) Jacob Abel	R	12–13
Newman Wachs Racing	37	(Republic of Ireland) Niall Murray	R	14
Newman Wachs Racing	38	(United States) Cameron Das		1–2
Newman Wachs Racing	38	(United States) Flinn Lazier	R	3–4
Pabst Racing Services	21	(Netherlands) Rinus VeeKay	R	All
Pabst Racing Services	22	(Guyana) Calvin Ming	R	All
Pabst Racing Services	23	(Brazil) Lucas Kohl		All
RJB Motorsports	20	(United States) Chandler Horton	R	1–8
Team BENIK	31	(United Kingdom) Toby Sowery	R	3–4
Team BENIK	31	(South Africa) Callan O'Keeffe	R	5–6, 14
Team BENIK	32	(United States) Darren Keane	R	3–6
Team Pelfrey	80	(United States) Robert Megennis		All
Team Pelfrey	81	(United States) Kaylen Frederick	R	All
Team Pelfrey	82	(Norway) Ayla Ågren		1–6, 9
Team Pelfrey	82	(United States) Jacob Loomis	R	7–8
Team Pelfrey	82	(United States) Phillippe Denes	R	12–14

Icon	Class
R	Rookie
N	National Class

== Schedule ==
A 14-race schedule was announced on September 14, 2016.

Icon	Legend
O	Oval/Speedway
R	Road course
S	Street circuit

Rd.	Date	Race name	Track	Location
1	March 11–12	Hi-Tide Boat Lifts Grand Prix of St. Petersburg	S Streets of St. Petersburg	St. Petersburg, Florida
2	March 11–12	Allied Building Products Grand Prix of St. Petersburg	S Streets of St. Petersburg	St. Petersburg, Florida
3	April 21–22	Mazda USF2000 Grand Prix of Alabama	R Barber Motorsports Park	Birmingham, Alabama
4	April 21–22	Mazda USF2000 Grand Prix of Alabama	R Barber Motorsports Park	Birmingham, Alabama
5	May 12–13	USF2000 Grand Prix of Indianapolis	R Indianapolis Motor Speedway Road Course	Speedway, Indiana
6	May 12–13	USF2000 Grand Prix of Indianapolis	R Indianapolis Motor Speedway Road Course	Speedway, Indiana
7	June 23–24	Cooper Tires Grand Prix of Road America	R Road America	Elkhart Lake, Wisconsin
8	June 23–24	Cooper Tires Grand Prix of Road America	R Road America	Elkhart Lake, Wisconsin
9	July 9	Mazda Iowa 60	O Iowa Speedway	Newton, Iowa
10	July 16–17	Cooper Tires USF2000 Grand Prix of Toronto	S Exhibition Place	Toronto, Canada
11	July 16–17	Cooper Tires USF2000 Grand Prix of Toronto	S Exhibition Place	Toronto, Canada
12	July 28–29	Cooper Tires USF2000 Grand Prix of Mid-Ohio	R Mid-Ohio Sports Car Course	Lexington, Ohio
13	July 28–29	Cooper Tires USF2000 Grand Prix of Mid-Ohio	R Mid-Ohio Sports Car Course	Lexington, Ohio
14	September 2	Mazda USF2000 Watkins Glen Grand Prix	R Watkins Glen International	Watkins Glen, New York

== Race results ==
Rd.	Track	Pole position	Fastest lap	Most laps led	Race winner	
Rd.	Track	Pole position	Fastest lap	Most laps led	Driver	Team
1	Streets of St. Petersburg	(United States) Robert Megennis	(United States) Oliver Askew	(United States) Robert Megennis	(United States) Robert Megennis	Team Pelfrey
2	Streets of St. Petersburg	(Canada) Parker Thompson	(United States) Oliver Askew	(United States) Oliver Askew	(United States) Oliver Askew	Cape Motorsports
3	Barber Motorsports Park	(United States) Oliver Askew	(United States) Kaylen Frederick	(United States) Oliver Askew	(United States) Oliver Askew	Cape Motorsports
4	Barber Motorsports Park	(United States) Oliver Askew	(United States) Kaylen Frederick	(United States) Oliver Askew	(United States) Oliver Askew	Cape Motorsports
5	Indianapolis Motor Speedway Road Course	(United States) Oliver Askew	(United States) Oliver Askew	(United States) Oliver Askew	(United States) Oliver Askew	Cape Motorsports
6	Indianapolis Motor Speedway Road Course	(United States) Oliver Askew	(United States) Oliver Askew	(United States) Oliver Askew	(United States) Oliver Askew	Cape Motorsports
7	Road America	(United States) David Malukas	(United States) Oliver Askew	(Netherlands) Rinus VeeKay	(Netherlands) Rinus VeeKay	Pabst Racing Services
8	Road America	(Netherlands) Rinus VeeKay	(Guyana) Calvin Ming	(Netherlands) Rinus VeeKay	(Netherlands) Rinus VeeKay	Pabst Racing Services
9	Iowa Speedway	(United States) Oliver Askew	(United States) Oliver Askew	(United States) Oliver Askew	(United States) Oliver Askew	Cape Motorsports
10	Streets of Toronto	(Canada) Parker Thompson	(Netherlands) Rinus VeeKay	(Canada) Parker Thompson	(Canada) Parker Thompson	Exclusive Autosport
11	Streets of Toronto	(United States) Oliver Askew	(Netherlands) Rinus VeeKay	(Canada) Parker Thompson	(Canada) Parker Thompson	Exclusive Autosport
12	Mid-Ohio Sports Car Course	(United States) Oliver Askew	(United States) Oliver Askew	(United States) Oliver Askew	(United States) Oliver Askew	Cape Motorsports
13	Mid-Ohio Sports Car Course	(Canada) Parker Thompson	(Canada) Parker Thompson	(Canada) Parker Thompson	(Canada) Parker Thompson	Exclusive Autosport
14	Watkins Glen International	(United States) Oliver Askew	(Netherlands) Rinus VeeKay	(Netherlands) Rinus VeeKay	(Netherlands) Rinus VeeKay	Pabst Racing Services

== Championship standings ==
=== Drivers' Championship ===
Pos	Driver	STP		BAR		IMS		ROA		IOW	TOR		MOH		WGL	Points
Championship class
1	(United States) Oliver Askew	2	1*	**1***	**1***	**1***	**1***	17	3	**1***	2	**12**	**1***	4	**2**	351
2	(Netherlands) Rinus VeeKay	3	2	3	4	6	2	1*	**1***	2	3	2	3	2	1*	344
3	(Canada) Parker Thompson	5	**3**	5	3	19	4	5	5	12	**1***	1*	2	**1***	16	269
4	(United States) Kaylen Frederick	4	5	2	2	DSQ	3	6	4	6	17	3	7	3	4	240
5	(Guyana) Calvin Ming	7	10	7	21	2	19	4	2	3	14	11	5	5	3	207
6	(United States) Robert Megennis	**1***	19	4	6	DSQ	7	7	15	5	13	5	17	7	10	173
7	(Brazil) Lucas Kohl	12	11	23	16	16	9	3	6	7	5	15	4	8	9	160
8	(United States) Devin Wojcik	19	7	12	24	11	13	8	9	9	7	6	11	10	14	140
9	(United States) Kory Enders	15	8	17	7	20	5	16	7	11	11	7	8	19	7	138
10	(United States) David Malukas					9	18	**2**	14		15	14	6	6	5	108
11	(United States) Darren Keane			16	11	17	11	10	18		10	4	9	16	8	104
12	(Mexico) Moisés de la Vara	9	18	15	9	8	14	13	13	10	8	DNS	DSQ	DSQ		98
13	(United States) Dev Gore	17	16	18	17	18	23	12	11	13	12	10	10	12	17	94
14	(United States) Dakota Dickerson	6	6	6	10	4	10									86
15	(India) Ricky Donison	13	17	21	23	3	8	15	10		16	DNS				75
16	(Australia) Luke Gabin	11	4	10	13	10	6									74
17	(Norway) Ayla Ågren	21	12	8	8	7	12			8						72
18	(United States) Colin Kaminsky	16	14	19	15	12	22	9	8				13	17		68
19	(Canada) Jayson Clunie					15	16	14	16		9	9	14	15	18	64
20	(France) Alexandre Baron									4	6	13			11	52
21	(Brazil) Bruna Tomaselli			15	18	14	20	19	12				15	14	15	49
22	(United States) Chandler Horton	20	13	20	14	13	15	18	17							39
23	(Mexico) Andres Gutierrez												12	11	6	35
24	(Mexico) José Sierra										4	8				32
25	(United States) Kris Wright	14	15	13	19	21	17									28
26	(United Kingdom) Toby Sowery			11	5											27
27	(South Africa) Callan O'Keeffe					5	21								12	27
28	(United States) Cameron Das	8	9													25
29	(United States) Andre Castro	10	20	9	22											25
30	(United States) Phillippe Denes												18	18	13	15
31	(United States) Jacob Abel												16	13		14
32	(United States) Jacob Loomis							11	19							13
33	(United States) Flinn Lazier			22	12											10
34	(Republic of Ireland) Niall Murray														19	2
35	(Australia) Bayley Mickler			24	20											2
36	(United States) Zach Holden														20	1
National class
1	(Brazil) Bruna Tomaselli	18	21													44
Pos	Driver	STP		BAR		IMS		ROA		IOW	TOR		MOH		WGL	Points

Color	Result
Gold	Winner
Silver	2nd place
Bronze	3rd place
Green	4th & 5th place
Light Blue	6th–10th place
Dark Blue	Finished (Outside Top 10)
Purple	Did not finish
Red	Did not qualify (DNQ)
Brown	Withdrawn (Wth)
Black	Disqualified (DSQ)
White	Did not start (DNS)
Blank	Did not participate

**In-line notation**
**Bold**	Pole position (1 point)
Italics	Ran fastest race lap (1 point)
*	Led most race laps (1 point); Not awarded if more than one driver leads most laps
Rookie

=== Teams' Championship ===
Pos	Team	Points
1	Pabst Racing	369
2	Cape Motorsports	277
3	Team Pelfrey	258
4	Exclusive Autosport	215
5	DEForce Racing	110
6	Newman Wachs Racing	102
7	ArmsUp Motorsports	85
8	John Cummiskey Racing	42
9	RJB Motorsports	32
10	Team BENIK	30
