= 2018 New Zealand Grand Prix =

- Race 3, Round 5 of 5 of the 2018 Toyota Racing Series

Race details
- Date: 11 February 2018
- Official name: LXIII New Zealand Grand Prix
- Location: Circuit Chris Amon, Feilding, New Zealand
- Course: Permanent racing facility
- Course length: 3.033 km (1.885 miles)
- Distance: 35 laps, 106.16 km (65.96 miles)
- Weather: Fine

Pole position
| Driver | (Netherlands) Richard Verschoor | M2 Competition |
- Time: 1:02.258

Fastest lap
| Driver | (Netherlands) Richard Verschoor | M2 Competition |
- Time: 1:04.038 on lap 10

Podium
| First | (Netherlands) Richard Verschoor | M2 Competition |
| Second | (Russia) Robert Shwartzman | M2 Competition |
| Third | (France) Charles Milesi | MTEC Motorsport |

The 2018 New Zealand Grand Prix event for open wheel racing cars was held at Circuit Chris Amon near Feilding on 11 February 2018. It was the sixty-third New Zealand Grand Prix and fielded Toyota Racing Series cars. The event was also the third race of the fifth round of the 2018 Toyota Racing Series, the final race of the series.

== Report ==
=== Qualifying ===
| Pos | No | Driver | Team | Lap | Grid |
|---|---|---|---|---|---|
| 1 | 7 | (Netherlands) Richard Verschoor | M2 Competition | 1:02.621 | 1 |
| 2 | 9 | (New Zealand) Marcus Armstrong | M2 Competition | 1:02.703 | 2 |
| 3 | 52 | (France) Charles Milesi | MTEC Motorsport | 1:02.792 | 3 |
| 4 | 35 | (Russia) Robert Shwartzman | M2 Competition | 1:02.974 | 4 |
| 5 | 17 | (United Kingdom) Clément Novalak | Giles Motorsport | 1:03.052 | 5 |
| 6 | 68 | (United States) Juan Manuel Correa | M2 Competition | 1:03.094 | 6 |
| 7 | 86 | (New Zealand) Brendon Leitch | Victory Motor Racing | 1:03.112 | 7 |
| 8 | 15 | (United Kingdom) James Pull | M2 Competition | 1:03.187 | 8 |
| 9 | 5 | (New Zealand) Ryan Yardley | MTEC Motorsport | 1:03.201 | 9 |
| 10 | 4 | (New Zealand) Reid Harker | Giles Motorsport | 1:03.384 | 10 |
| 11 | 11 | (New Zealand) Taylor Cockerton | MTEC Motorsport | 1:03.444 | 11 |
| 12 | 28 | (United States) Cameron Das | Victory Motor Racing | 1:03.475 | 12 |
| 13 | 47 | (New Zealand) Ken Smith | Victory Motor Racing | 1:04.200 | 13 |

=== Race ===
| Pos | No | Driver | Team | Laps | Time / Retired | Grid |
|---|---|---|---|---|---|---|
| 1 | 7 | (Netherlands) Richard Verschoor | M2 Competition | 35 | 39min 41.672sec | 1 |
| 2 | 35 | (Russia) Robert Shwartzman | M2 Competition | 35 | + 0.783 s | 4 |
| 3 | 52 | (France) Charles Milesi | MTEC Motorsport | 35 | + 1.608 s | 3 |
| 4 | 68 | (United States) Juan Manuel Correa | M2 Competition | 35 | + 1.921 s | 6 |
| 5 | 86 | (New Zealand) Brendon Leitch | Victory Motor Racing | 35 | + 2.013 s | 7 |
| 6 | 17 | (United Kingdom) Clément Novalak | Giles Motorsport | 35 | + 2.366 s | 5 |
| 7 | 9 | (New Zealand) Marcus Armstrong | M2 Competition | 35 | + 2.722 s | 2 |
| 8 | 5 | (New Zealand) Ryan Yardley | MTEC Motorsport | 35 | + 3.387 s | 9 |
| 9 | 4 | (New Zealand) Reid Harker | Giles Motorsport | 35 | + 3.684 s | 10 |
| 10 | 15 | (United Kingdom) James Pull | M2 Competition | 35 | + 3.888 s | 8 |
| 11 | 28 | (United States) Cameron Das | Victory Motor Racing | 35 | + 4.721 s | 12 |
| 12 | 47 | (New Zealand) Ken Smith | Victory Motor Racing | 35 | + 5.185 s | 13 |
| Ret | 11 | (New Zealand) Taylor Cockerton | MTEC Motorsport | 30 | Retired | 11 |
Fastest Lap: (Netherlands) Richard Verschoor (M2 Competition) – 1:04.038 on lap 10

| Preceded by 2018 Taupo TRS round | Toyota Racing Series; 2018 | Succeeded by end of season |
| Preceded by 2017 New Zealand Grand Prix | New Zealand Grand Prix; 2018 | Succeeded by 2019 New Zealand Grand Prix |
