= Marcus Armstrong =

New Zealand racing driver (born 2000)

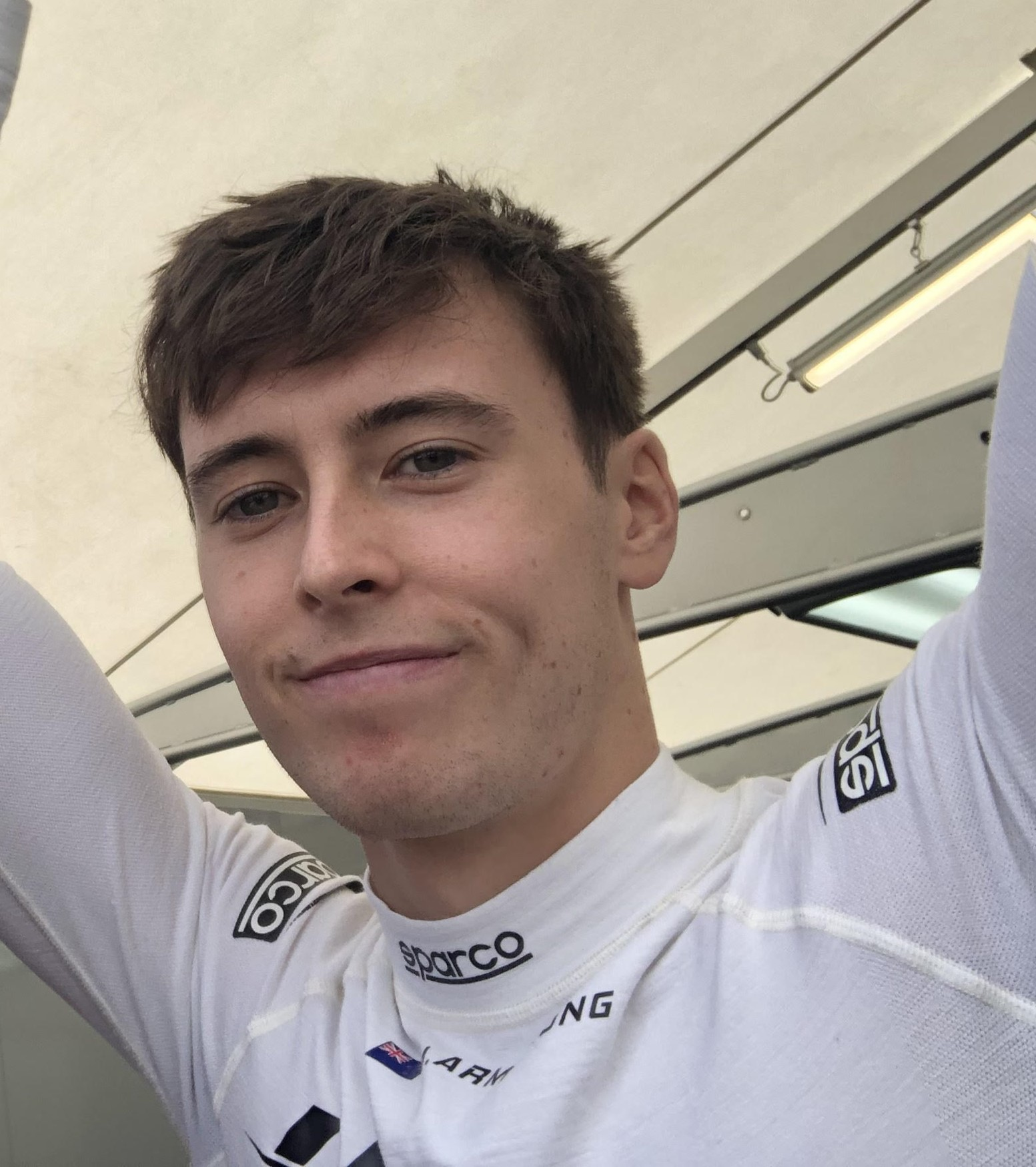
- Armstrong in 2022
- Nationality: New Zealander
- Born: Marcus John Armstrong; 29 July 2000 (age 26); Christchurch, New Zealand

IndyCar Series career
- 59 races run over 3 years
- Team: No. 60 (Meyer Shank Racing)
- Best finish: 8th (2025)
- First race: 2023 Grand Prix of St. Petersburg (St. Petersburg)
- Last race: 2026 Mission Grand Prix of Monterey (Laguna Seca)
Wins	Podiums	Poles
0	2	0

Previous series
- 2020–2022; 2019; 2018; 2017–2019; 2017; 2017; 2016; 2016; 2016: FIA Formula 2; FIA Formula 3; FIA F3 European; Toyota Racing Series; ADAC F4; Italian F4; Formula Renault Eurocup; Formula Renault 2.0 NEC; BRDC F3 Autumn Trophy

Championship titles
- 2017 2018: Italian F4 Championship; Lady Wigram Trophy

Awards
- 2023: IndyCar Series Rookie of the Year

Marcus John Armstrong (born 29 July 2000) is a New Zealand motor racing driver who competes in the IndyCar series, driving the No. 60 Honda for Meyer Shank Racing. He competed in the FIA Formula 2 Championship between 2020 and 2022, and was the 2019 Formula 3 runner-up. He was a member of the Ferrari Driver Academy between 2017 and 2021.

Armstrong started single-seaters in 2014, and in the following year won his only single-seater title to date in the 2017 Italian F4 Championship whilst becoming runner-up in the 2017 ADAC Formula 4 Championship. He stepped to the FIA Formula 3 European Championship in 2018, ending fifth. The championship merged into the FIA Formula 3 Championship in 2019, and Armstrong became runner-up to teammate Robert Shwartzman. He was promoted to the 2020 Formula 2 Championship with ART Grand Prix but a difficult season saw him finish thirteenth. He also finished in the same position in the following year with DAMS, and came thirteenth again in the 2022 Formula 2 Championship with Hitech Grand Prix before making the switch to IndyCar.

Armstrong won the IndyCar Rookie of the Year award in 2023 and his first podium in the series the following year whilst driving for Chip Ganassi Racing. In 2025, he moved to Meyer Shank Racing, earning his second podium that same year.

== Junior racing career ==
=== Karting (2010–2016) ===
Born in Christchurch, Armstrong began karting in 2010, winning all his major titles in New Zealand from 2011 to 2014. He did not achieve much in international competitions, placing a highest of twelfth during the Karting World Championship in the KF2 category in 2015. In an article by Motorsport.com, Armstrong was ranked third of the most exciting karting talents of 2016.

=== Lower formulae (2014–2017) ===
==== 2014–2016: Junior formulae debut ====
Whilst still karting, Armstrong made his single seater debut in 2014. Competing in the 2014–15 season of the New Zealand Formula Ford Championship, he finished the season at seventh in the standings.

In November 2015, Armstrong tested a Eurocup Formula Renault 2.0 car in 2015 Eurocup Formula Renault 2.0 post-season test. In 2016, Armstrong once again diversified his karting with stints in BRDC British Formula 3 and the two Formula Renault 2.0 series. In the latter series, he competed as a guest driver during the final round at Estoril, and finished ninth and tenth.

==== 2017: Championship win as a Ferrari junior ====
===== Italian F4 =====
After signing in December 2016, Ferrari announced that Armstrong had signed to their Driver Academy, alongside his campaigns in both the ADAC F4 and Italian F4 championships with Prema Powerteam. Armstrong had a relatively slow start to the season, scoring three third-places and two non-scoring finishes across the opening two rounds. The next round at Vallelunga saw Armstrong claim his maiden win of the year From then, Armstrong's form had been stellar, winning three more times including appearing on the podium at all races during the second Mugello round. In the Monza season finale, Armstrong finished second in the first race, which was enough to claim the title with two races to spare.

==== ADAC F4 ====
Armstrong partook in all races, as the races did not clash with his Italian F4 campaign. Though starting the season with two non-scoring finishes in the first two rounds, he bounced back and took his first ADAC F4 win at the Red Bull Ring and two more podium finishes there. His podium streak continued towards Oscbersleben, scoring another win and a second place. Another win at the Nürburgring hauled him into championship contention, but eventually lost out to eventual champion and future F2 teammate Jüri Vips by a mere 4.5 points, and Armstrong settled as vice-champion.

=== Toyota Racing Series (2017–2019) ===
==== 2017 ====
Armstrong was confirmed to race in the Toyota Racing Series with M2 Competition in December 2016. Armstrong won the season opener on his debut, but retired in the third race due to a collision. His next would come at the third round in Hampton during the first race, but again failed to finish the third race after touching with Richard Verschoor. A further win and two second places in the final round saw Armstrong managed fourth in the championship.

==== 2018 ====
For 2018, Armstrong returned to the Toyota Racing Series with M2 Competition. Armstrong started his season in perfect fashion, taking third in the first race and winning the other two, though those wins would be the only one of the season. Armstrong continued his podium streak in Teretonga and Hampton, which increased his lead to 41 points. However, he only yielded one podium in the next five races, bringing the gap down to ten points over second-placed Robert Shwartzman and 23 points to Richard Verschoor. With four laps to go after a safety car restart, Armstrong had a mechanical failure whilst leading, and dropped to seventh at the flag. This was meant that Shwartzman and Verschoor dropped Armstrong to third in the championship, losing by fifteen points as the former won the championship.

==== 2019 ====
Armstrong returned for the 2019 season with M2 Competition. He started the season by taking podiums in all three races, He would take his first win at the only race at Teretonga. He took two wins in four races at Hampton Downs, which saw him take the lead of the championship from fellow Kiwi Liam Lawson. Armstrong had a suspension issue during the fourth round at Taupo, yet still won the final race during the round but lost the championship lead heading into the final round by five points to Lawson. In the first race during the final round, Armstrong beat Lawson in the first race, but ended the other two behind him. This meant that Lawson was the champion by ten points, and Armstrong ended the series as runner-up with 346 points and five wins.

=== FIA Formula 3 (2018–2019, 2023) ===
==== 2018 ====
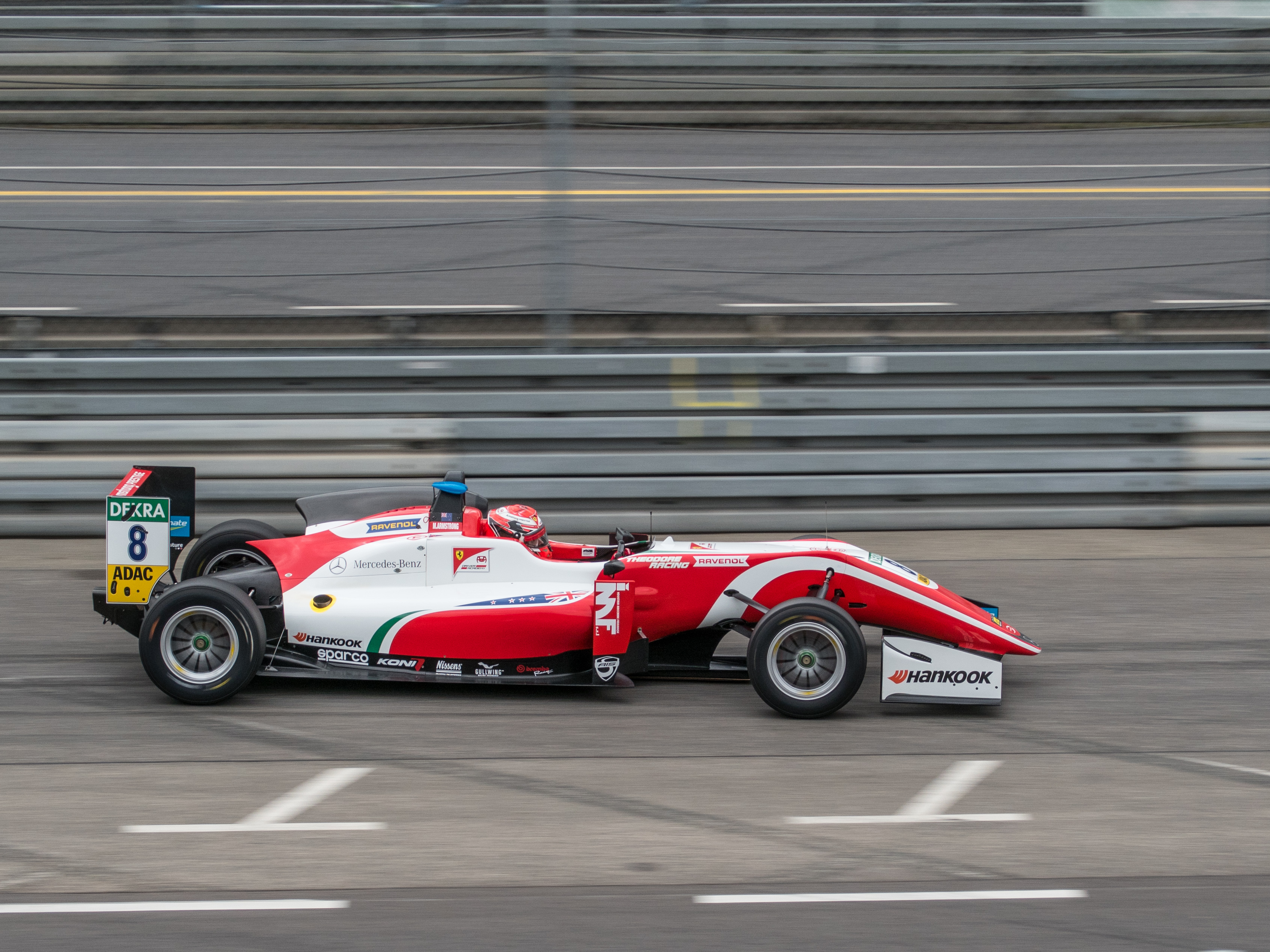
Armstrong driving in the 2018 FIA Formula 3 European Championship

Armstrong continued his partnership with Prema, graduating to the FIA Formula 3 European Championship, alongside fellow Ferrari juniors Robert Shwartzman and Guanyu Zhou. He scored a podium in just his second race at Pau, and a second place during the second round at the Hungaroring. His first win came at the Norisring and also capitalised by claiming two more podiums during the round, which saw him take the lead of the standings. He continued his championship lead for the next two rounds, which yielded two podiums. In Silverstone, Armstrong struggled with tyre wear and lost the lead of the standings to Dan Ticktum. At Misano, Armstrong scored a second place in the first race, but did not score in the other two which included a retirement in the third race from pole due to being hit from behind. Armstrong earned his ninth and last podium at the Red Bull Ring, but a triple retirement in the final round at the Hockenheimring saw him drop from 3rd to 5th in the standings, scoring 260 points.

===== Macau Grand Prix =====
At the season ending Macau Grand Prix, Armstrong finished eighth on his Macau debut having finished in the same position during the qualification race.

==== 2019 ====
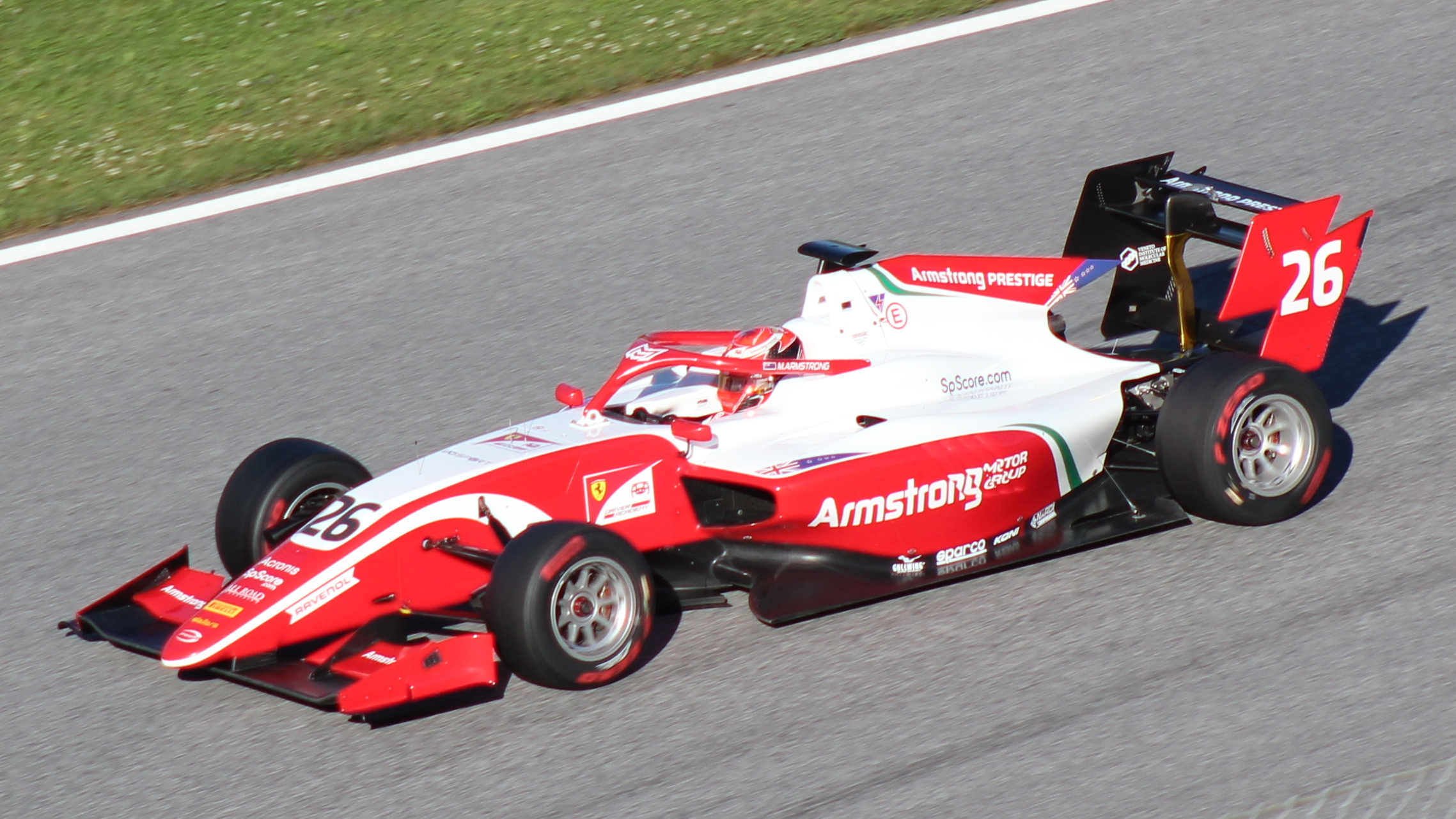
Armstrong driving the Dallara F3 2019 during the 2019 Spielberg Formula 3 round.

Armstrong reunited with Prema Racing to contest the inaugural FIA Formula 3 Championship, partnering 2018 teammates Robert Shwartzman and Jehan Daruvala. In April 2019, Armstrong joined Nicolas Todt's All Road Management scheme. In the first round in Barcelona, Armstrong qualified third. He finished in the same position having tried to challenge Shwartzman on the opening lap. In Race 2, Armstrong made a strong start to take fourth on the opening lap, and later passed Max Fewtrell for third. However, Armstrong would fall to fifth place at the end of the race. Armstrong qualified fifth in Paul Ricard, and had a strong Race 1 up till lap 16, where Armstrong collided and spun with Jake Hughes whilst fighting for second place. Hughes was out on the spot, but Armstrong managed to continue and finish sixth. Armstrong had bad luck in Race 2, where he stalled from starting third, but made a brilliant charge to take sixth place in the end.

At the Red Bull Ring, Armstrong topped practice and later took his first pole position of the year. He lost the lead to Renault junior Max Fewtrell and re-took it back later. However, him and Jüri Vips passed him which dropped Armstrong to third, and defended from teammate Daruvala to cling onto third and another podium. He later stated that "it was a lot more difficult to overtake than [I] expected". From sixth in Race 2, Armstrong quickly moved up into second behind Shwartzman and kept him honest for most of the race. On the final lap, Armstrong overtook Shwartzman however the Russian clipped Armstrong which punctured the New Zealander's rear tyre and fell to nineteenth. In Silverstone, Armstrong qualified on the front row in second, but dropped two places at the start. He re-passed Renault junior Christian Lundgaard and pressured Daruvala for second place, but ultimately settled for third. In Race 2, Armstrong sat in seventh for most of the race until Daruvala and Pedro Piquet collided on the penultimate lap, and also overtook Lundgaard to snatch fourth. At the Hungaroring, Armstrong qualified lower down in thirteenth. He was unable to progress through the field easily, during the first race and managed to take eighth place and claim reverse pole for Race 2. He defended from Leonardo Pulcini at the start, but managed to take his first victory of the season, in a lights-to-flag manner. Heading into the summer break and the final three rounds of the season, Armstrong sat fourth in the standings with 98 points, 36 off leader Shwartzman.

Armstrong had his worst qualifying of the year in Spa-Francorchamps, securing only 19th. In Race 1, Armstrong was up to 11th by lap 6, and cruised to eighth position to once again take reverse pole for the next race. He once again took victory by winning Race 2 over Yuki Tsunoda, and he dedicated his win to Anthoine Hubert, who died in a crash the night before. In Monza, Armstrong qualified second, but was demoted to start seventh for driving unnecessarily slowly. In Race 1, Armstrong bolted to second at the end of the opening lap when Lundgaard and Lirim Zendeli, before taking the lead on lap four from Richard Verschoor. However ten laps later, he would succumb the lead to Shwartzman and Armstrong would finish in second place. Unfortunately, he was penalised twenty seconds for exceeding the minimum delta time during the race's first safety car period and dropped to 21st. A small collision with David Beckmann saw Armstrong drop back, but recovered to 14th and end the weekend without points. Topping practice at the final round in Sochi, Armstrong went on to qualify third. In Race 1, he moved into the lead into the first corner, but lost the lead to Niko Kari on lap nine and two further positions a lap later. Despite that, he would re-pass Pulcini and Kari back before overtaking Shwartzman on the final lap to claim the win while Shwartzman clinched the title. In Race 2, Armstrong moved up to third on lap five when Pulcini and Hughes collided. He passed Piquet on lap seventeen to take second in the final race of the year. His result meant he became vice-champion and overhauled Daruvala's tally by one point. Overall, Armstrong scored 158 points whilst claiming three victories, seven podiums, three poles (two reverse), and four fastest laps.

===== Macau Grand Prix =====
Armstrong returned to participate in the 2019 Macau Grand Prix. Though starting from seventeenth on the grid, Armstrong finished the eighth in the overall race.

Armstrong was ranked seventh in Motorsport.com's article of top-twenty junior single-seater drivers in 2019.

==== Macau Grand Prix (2023) ====
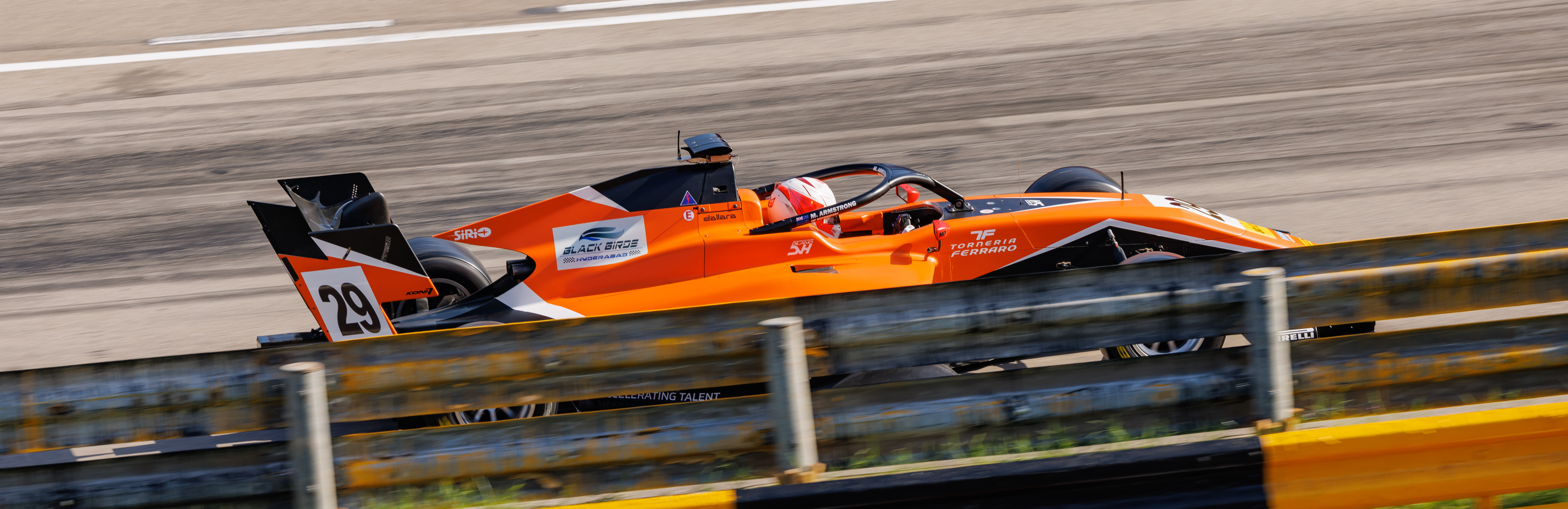
Armstrong competing at the 2023 Macau Grand Prix.

In November 2023, Armstrong returned to Formula 3 to the Macau Grand Prix with MP Motorsport. Ahead of the event, the Kiwi mentioned he had "unfinished business". He finished the main race in 18th place, behind both teammates Dennis Hauger and Mari Boya.

=== FIA Formula 2 (2020–2022) ===
==== 2020 ====
On 28 November 2019, it was announced Armstrong would graduate to the FIA Formula 2 Championship with ART Grand Prix to partner F3 rival and Renault Sport Academy member Christian Lundgaard. Before his debut F2 season, he stated that he "[felt] massively privileged" and "really confident". In the delayed start of the season, he qualified thirteenth in the Austrian opening round. He pitted very early on lap eight during the feature race and his gamble would pay off, as he ran in fourth place once all drivers had pitted. When Guanyu Zhou and Mick Schumacher ahead encountered problems of their own, Armstrong capitalised on the opportunity and rushed to second placed podium on his debut. During the sprint race, he made a lightning start, picking up four places on the opening lap to move into third. He nearly overtook Louis Delétraz on lap seven, but suffered a mechanical issue on lap fourteen and was forced to retire from the race. During the second Austrian round, he qualified twelfth. He made progress in the feature race and made his way to seventh place. Starting second in the sprint race, he was passed by Lundgaard at the start and later by Schumacher on lap twelve. But just two laps later, Schumacher had a problem with his fire extinguisher and Armstrong re-took third place and claimed his second and last podium of the season.

Following that however, Armstrong went pointless for the next six rounds. It started in Hungary, where he qualified in the top ten for the first time that year. He lost three places in the feature race, and his race worsened as he tried to avoid the slowing Lundgaard and tagged Artem Markelov, sending the Russian into the barriers. Armstrong suffered damage and peeled into the pits to retire. He made a rocket start in the sprint race, he was up to fourteenth by the first lap. Armstrong overtook more of his rivals and narrowly missed out on points, in ninth as he lost the final points-paying position to Zhou on the last lap. The next five rounds yielded little for Armstrong, and he would get mediocre results. During the ninth round in Mugello, until the feature race in Mugello, Armstrong qualified fourth his joint-best qualifying of the year. He made a decent start, passing Callum Ilott at the start, but was overtaken by Luca Ghiotto seconds later. Armstrong ran in sixth place before the safety car periods, which he avoided the chaos following the first restart. He managed to take his first points since Austria in ninth place. and fell out of the top ten in the standings. In the sprint race, Armstrong made a great start to seventh, but was overtaken by many rivals and eventually finished 11th.

In Russia, Armstrong started 14th and took another points finish, claiming ninth in the feature race. In the red-flagged sprint, he lost four positions whilst running tenth after making a careless error and running wide, which left him to finish 14th. He qualified fourth again in Bahrain. He moved past Ticktum at the start, and later passed Ilott for second despite being on the harder tyres. However, he would soon be behind Schumacher, and fell back to third. Following the pit stops, he lost positions to his rivals and eventually secured seventh. Starting second in the sprint race, he would be overtaken by Nikita Mazepin midway through the race, then later overtaken by both Charouz drivers. However, when Pedro Piquet had a mechanical issue, Armstrong went to finish fourth. He ended his season by finishing eleventh and fourteenth in the final race. Overall, Armstrong ended thirteenth in the standings with 52 points compared to teammate Lundgaard's 149, his worst ever placing in a full-time series. He scored two podiums and five more points finishes.

==== 2021 ====
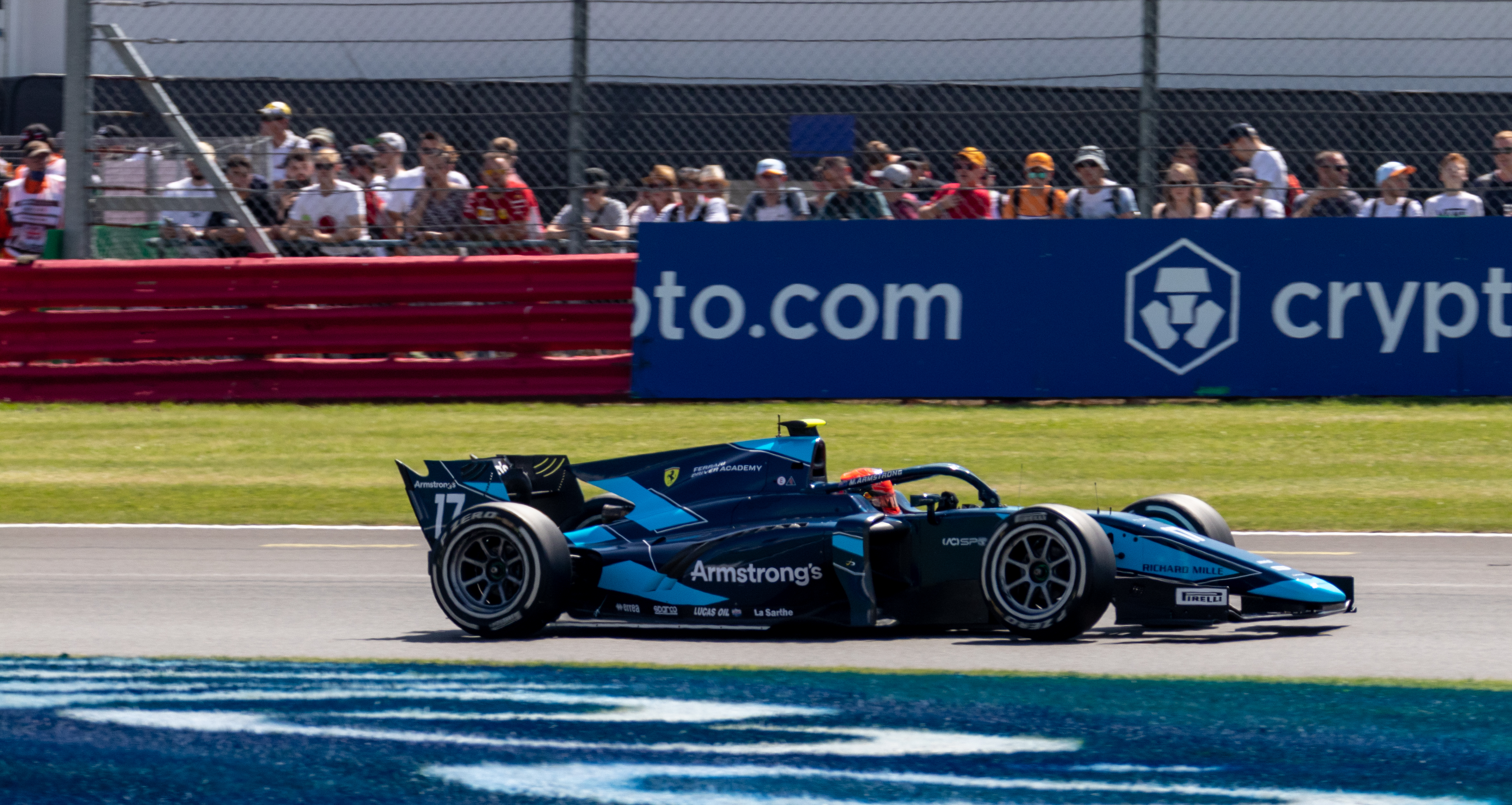
Armstrong driving the Dallara F2 2018 during the 2021 Silverstone Formula 2 round.

For the 2021 season, Armstrong moved to DAMS to partner Roy Nissany. Having topped the final day of pre-season testing, while saying that "the intensity is really high". He qualified in thirteenth, and his sprint race 1 was relatively short as he suffered a power loss after just completing two laps. In Sprint Race 2, he had another unfortunate race. He impressively made his way up to sixth place by lap thirteen but two laps later, the safety car was deployed due to a collision. He stayed out, and dispatched Bent Viscaal for second place during the restart. However, rivals on fresher tyres passed him and he eventually finished in tenth. In the feature race, Armstrong had a good beginning half of the race, as he was up to fourth by lap eight. He made a timely pit stop under the safety car and led the field. However, during the restart he dropped two places to Oscar Piastri and Richard Verschoor. He lost a few more places and capped off the race in fifth place. In Monaco, he qualified fourteenth and made up two places at the start of the first sprint. He inherited a place following Christian Lundgaard's retirement. On the final lap, he made a divebomb on Jehan Daruvala into the penultimate corner, sending him up to tenth and giving him reverse pole for the second sprint. Unfortunately, Armstrong was forced to start from the pit lane due to a car problem. Further issues continued and he dropped out of the race on lap three. In the feature race, whilst running tenth, he collided with Jüri Vips, the Estonian driver shoving him into the wall and capping off a miserable weekend for Armstrong.

In Baku, Armstrong qualified sixth and would start fifth in sprint race 1. He made up a position at the start on Ralph Boschung but was back in fifth after being overtaken by Dan Ticktum. He lost two positions on the penultimate lap to end seventh, and was nearly passed by Vips on the line. In the second sprint, Armstrong battled Bent Viscaal on lap eight following a safety car restart, but misjudged his braking point due to cold tyres and slammed into the wall, ending his race. His feature race barely lasted half a lap, as he was sent into the wall due to being hit by Théo Pourchaire, which was ultimately caused by Ticktum. By that point, Armstrong had only twelve points to his name, and trailed teammate Nissany in the standings. In Silverstone, he again qualified fourteenth and made a storming start in the first sprint race, moving up to ninth and remaining there for the entire race. Starting second in the second sprint race, Armstrong could not find a way past eventual race winner Richard Verschoor throughout the 21-lap race but managed to claim his first F2 podium in slightly more than a year. He had an uneventful feature race, he finished 12th.

In Monza, Armstrong qualified 17th and had poor performances in the sprint races, he ended eleventh and fifteenth in sprint 1 and sprint 2 respectively. In the feature race, he started on the hard tyres and it would pay off as he managed to overtake some rivals following a safety car restart to finish tenth, though he was later promoted to ninth due to Verschoor's disqualification. In Russia where the second sprint was cancelled, Armstrong qualified eleventh, and finished both races in the same position.

The inaugural race in Jeddah, saw Armstrong qualify ninth, giving him second for the first sprint race. He managed to overtake fellow Kiwi Liam Lawson into the first corner. Despite Lawson pressuring him on the final lap, Armstrong held on and won his first Formula 2 race. On his win, Armstrong stated that the win was "a reward for the work done by [his] DAMS team during a difficult 2021 season". In the second sprint race however, his fortunes were reversed as he was hit from behind by Clément Novalak. In a shortened feature race, he secured points in eighth place. In Yas Marina, Armstrong finished sprint race 1 in tenth having started eleventh, giving him reverse pole for the second time that year. He would be on course for his third podium of the season in the second sprint race, but had to retire due to an engine failure whilst leading the race. In the feature race, he went on the alternate strategy and overtook his rivals, which rewarded him with seventh in the end, despite attacking Ticktum in the dying minutes of the race. Armstrong once again ended his F2 campaign in thirteenth with 49 points, two podiums, five other points finishes while also beating teammate Nissany. Talking about the season in general, Armstrong admitted that “at times last year I felt like I was a bit blind," and that he didn't have the data to push for better results.

==== 2022 ====
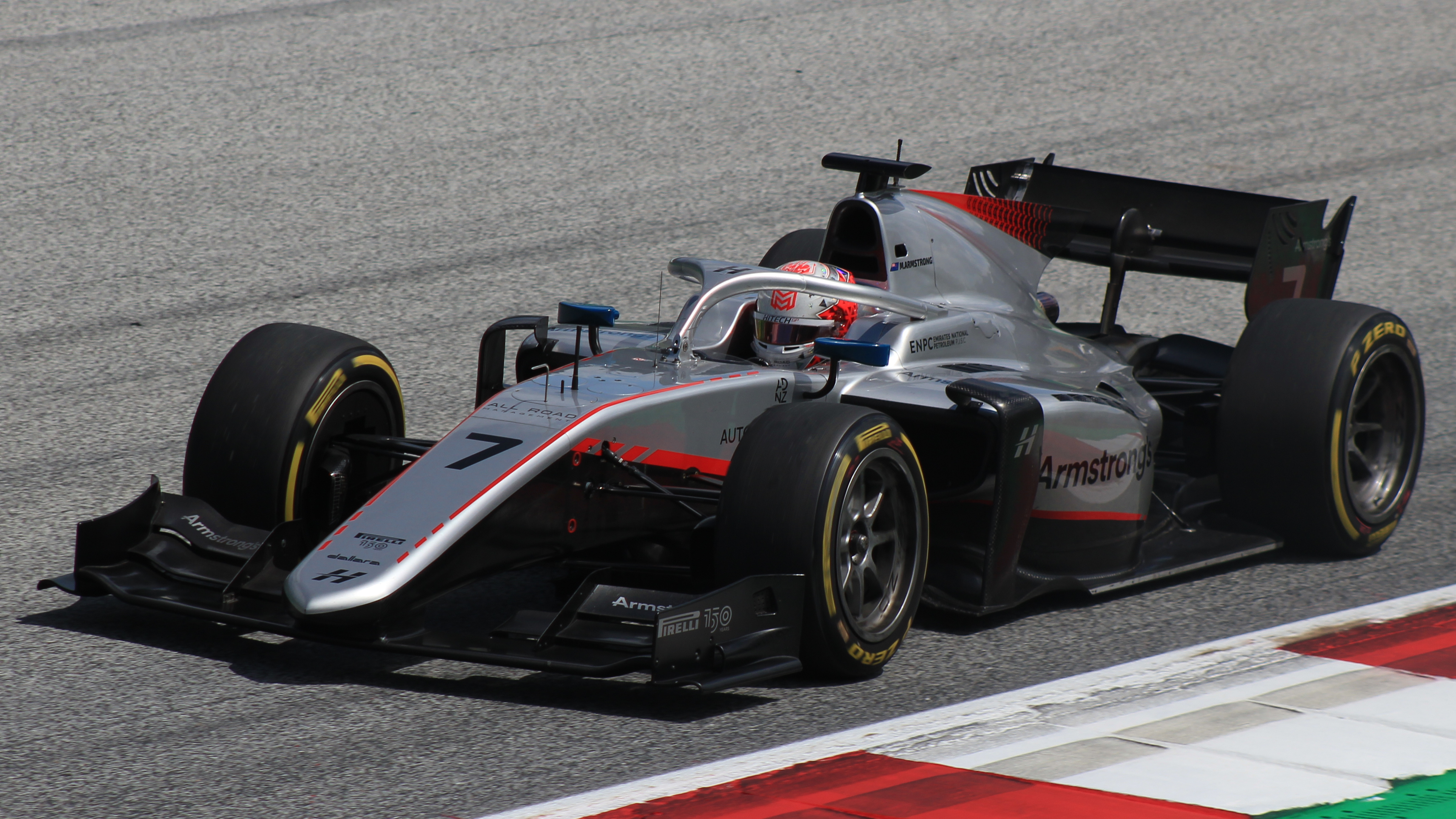
Armstrong driving for Hitech Grand Prix during the 2022 Spielberg Formula 2 round.

Having driven in the post-season test with them, Armstrong signed a deal to for Hitech Grand Prix during the 2022 season, partnering Jüri Vips. Shortly before the season, Armstrong commented that he "not going to give up" F1 seat and "[did] not want to leave anything off the table in 2022".

For the opening Bahrain round, Armstrong qualified thirteenth and made up positions until his race was cut short on lap three when Jake Hughes thumped him at the back, sending Armstrong into a stall. He had a much better feature race, starting on the softs saw him up to third by lap eleven. A late safety car saw him jump Felipe Drugovich and cross the line in fifth place. In Jeddah, he qualified fourth, but was given his first ever top-three start after Jack Doohan was disqualified. In the sprint race, Armstrong was engrossed in a tight battle with Vips but the Estonian driver won out. With just three laps to go, Armstrong again retired as he spun, with his engine unable to get going. In the feature race, he was passed by Liam Lawson at the end of the opening lap, before regaining it as Lawson had a problem in the pits. However, Armstrong would end in fifth place as he was overtaken by Jehan Daruvala and Hughes towards the end.

In Imola, Armstrong qualified ninth, giving him a second place start for the sprint race. He made a decent start to jump Logan Sargeant off the line, and never looked back to take his first win of the year and second overall ahead of both Prema cars, despite having no radio for the entire race. In the feature race, he finished in sixteenth after an early safety car ruined his alternate strategy. The Barcelona round saw him end tenth after starting thirteenth in the sprint race. Again on the alternate strategy in the feature race, Armstrong would exit the pits in tenth, but fought back and claim seventh, passing Théo Pourchaire on the last lap.

Armstrong qualified seventh in Monaco. Starting fourth in the sprint race, he was immediately in third when Hughes stalled. He would remain in the position for the remainder of the race and claim another podium. His feature race was uneventful, he ended seventh, giving his first double points finish in an F2 event and climbed to fourth in the standings. In Baku, he qualified fourth. In the sprint race, he avoided all the chaos and broke through with a fourth-place finish. In the feature race, Armstrong passed Dennis Hauger at the start then later on Lawson during the lap five safety car restart. Another safety car restart on lap fifteen saw the Kiwi lock up and nosed into the back of teammate Vips on the restart, and was forced to pit due to damage. Armstrong would eventually finish the race in twelfth place, in a race which would have been so much more for the Kiwi driver.

In Silverstone, Armstrong started twelfth and made up positions to claim ninth, narrowly missing points. In the feature race, he did manage points however, finishing eighth after having a good start that saw him ninth at the end of the first lap. During the Red Bull Ring round, he qualified tenth, giving him reverse pole for the sprint race. He proceeded to dominate the sprint race, leading every lap to claim victory. In the feature race on a drying track, some of his rivals opted to start on wets while the Kiwi was the leading driver on slicks. At turn three, Armstrong ran wide to avoid Richard Verschoor but was hit by another rival, and came to a halt moments later.

In France, Armstrong qualified eighth. Lining up third for the sprint race, he jumped Lawson at the start but he was back down in third on lap four. On lap nineteen, Armstrong made an unsuccessful overtake and collided with Daruvala which opened the door for Pourchaire, and the Frenchman forced him wide which dropped Armstrong to sixth. He was again forced off by Vips and he eventually finished in ninth, before being dropped to fourteenth for colliding with Daruvala. Once again in the feature race, his race finished on lap one as he was sent into a spin by David Beckmann, before being collected by Hauger. In Budapest, he took his first front row start in F2 by qualifying second. Ending the sprint race in seventh, despite contact with Daruvala. In the feature race, he stormed into the lead passing polesitter Ayumu Iwasa before turn one. However, a slow pit stop saw him passed by Pourchaire and Iwasa towards the end. He would also be jumped by Enzo Fittipaldi. Drivers behind passed him on fresher tyres, and Armstrong had to settle with sixth place in the end.

In Spa-Francorchamps, Armstrong qualified 12th and made a brilliant start in the sprint race, passing five cars to take seventh place on the opening lap, and would finish in that position. In the feature race, he ended down in thirteenth after a penalty was given to him for forcing another driver off track. Zandvoort went better for him, he qualified ninth and started second for the sprint race. He was able to jump polesitter Clément Novalak and lead every remaining lap to claim his third win of the season. In the feature race, he made contact early on with Novalak while fighting over seventh but both came out unscathed. On the alternate strategy it was ruined when Marino Sato brought out the safety car, and Armstrong was not allowed to pit under safety car conditions. He pitted shortly after the safety car withdrew and he finished fourteenth.

In Monza, Armstrong qualified third. Armstrong initially finished sixth in the sprint race, but was given a five-second time penalty for gaining an advantage off-track. He was up to second before the pit stops and pitted during the lap eight safety car but entered beyond the pit lane entry bollard which earned a ten-second stop and go penalty, and was added by another of the same penalty for speeding in the pit lane. He eventually finished in twelfth. Armstrong had an uneventful Abu Dhabi weekend, he quietly achieved points in the feature race with ninth place. Once again, Armstrong ended thirteenth in the standings, with 93 points.

== Formula One ==
In November 2016, Armstrong was among five drivers invited to join the Ferrari Driver Academy, formally announced at the start of 2017. He made his F1 test debut in January at the Fiorano, driving the 2018 Ferrari SF71H, stating that "the car was not too difficult to drive". He tested the same car at Fiorano in April, completing more than 200 km. Following his 2021 season, he and Ferrari parted ways. Speaking about his departure, the Kiwi said that "[he] knew [staying with the FDA] was a dead end".

== IndyCar ==
In October 2022, Armstrong tested an IndyCar car for the first time with Dale Coyne Racing at the Sebring International Raceway. Following the test, team boss Dale Coyne said that "he was a very good candidate" for Dale Coyne Racing, as the American-based team was intending to expand to three entries for the 2023 IndyCar Series.

=== Chip Ganassi Racing (2023–2024) ===
==== 2023 season ====
On 2 December 2022, it was announced that Chip Ganassi Racing signed Armstrong to drive the No. 11 entry (formerly the No. 48) on the road courses and street circuits in 2023. Despite entering the season as a rookie, he stated that he needed to "get on it straightaway", to experienced teammates Scott Dixon, Marcus Ericsson and Álex Palou. Armstrong finished his debut in St. Petersburg in a respectable eleventh place, only three places behind his nearby teammate. In just his second race at Long Beach, Armstrong finished in eighth. From the sixth to ninth race, Armstrong would place in the top-ten bar one, achieving a high of seventh place at the 2023 Honda Indy Toronto which was his best finish of the year. He would only finish in the top-ten just once in the next four races he participated, finishing eighth during the Laguna Seca finale despite many collisions with other drivers. Overall, Armstrong ended the season twentieth overall with 214 points, and was the Rookie Of The Year despite missing many races, which he described "a great bonus".

Armstrong then partook in his first oval test just after the season finale. He then completed the Indy Rookie Orientation Programme in October within 57 laps, paving the way for him to compete in the Indy 500 the following year.

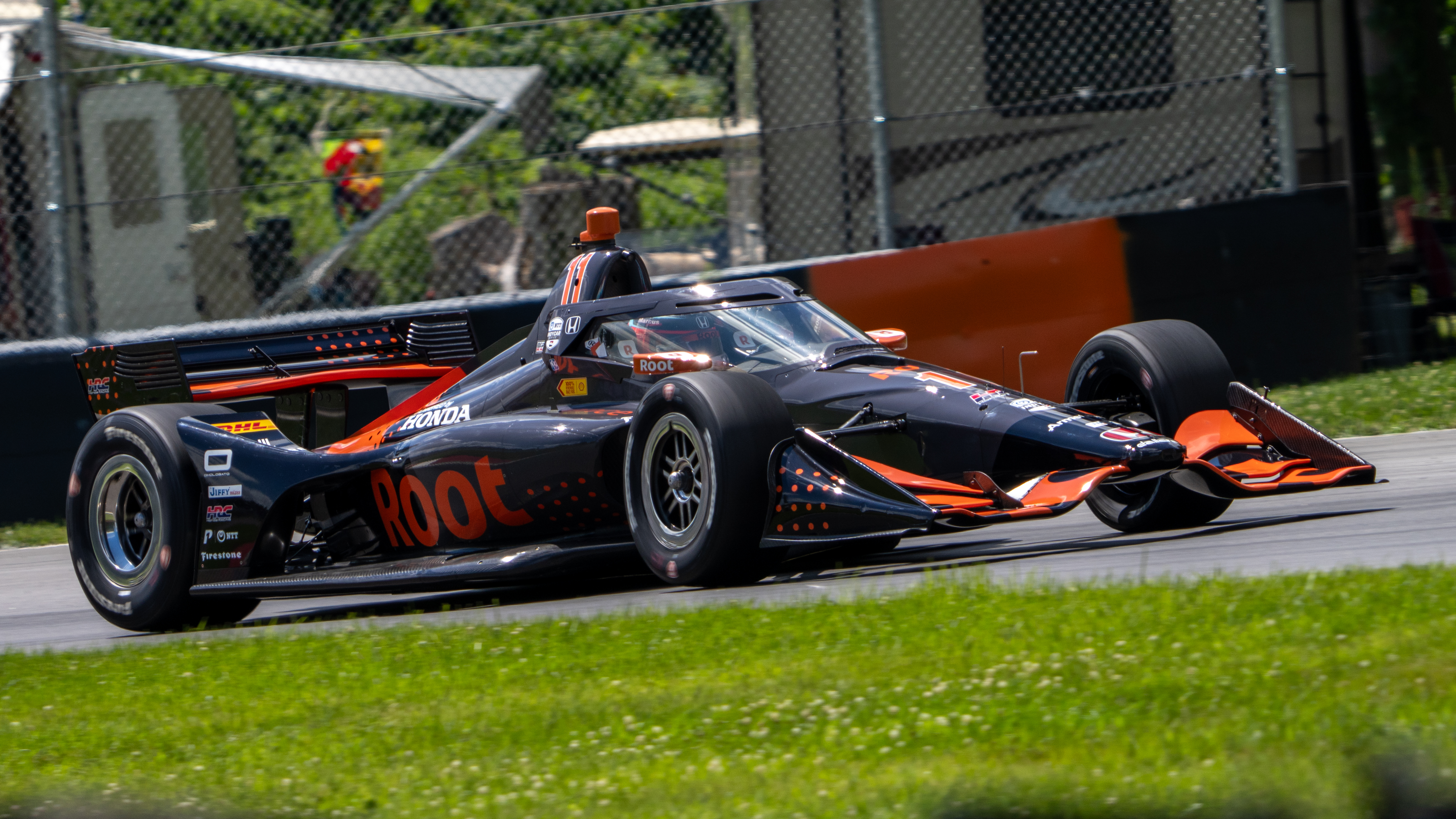
Armstrong competing in 2024 at the Mid-Ohio Sports Car Course

==== 2024 season ====
Armstrong extended his contract with Chip Ganassi Racing, becoming a full-time driver for the 2024 season. At the Sonsio Grand Prix, Armstrong finished in fifth place having been in the fight for the lead. Unfortunately for Armstrong, his first Indy 500 ended with an engine failure in the opening laps. Despite that, Armstong picked up his first IndyCar podium with a third-place finish at Detroit. Four more top-ten finishes in the final six races, which included two fifth-place finishes, saw Armstrong finish fourteenth in the standings with 298 points.

=== Meyer Shank Racing (2025–) ===
==== 2025 season ====
After two seasons with Chip Ganassi Racing, Armstrong moved to Meyer Shank Racing for the 2025 season, partnering Felix Rosenqvist. Despite starting the season with a retirement in St. Petersburg, he bounced back and took a seventh place in Thermal. After another seventh place in the Sonsio Grand Prix, he suffered a heavy crash during pre-qualifying practice for the Indianapolis 500. He was cleared for the event and finished the event eighteenth. Following that, Armstrong began a run of six consecutive finishes in the top ten, which included his second career podium during the second race in Iowa. Further strong results followed towards the end of the season with two eighth-places in Laguna Seca and Portland, and he added a tenth place in Milwaukee. Armstrong finished the season eighth in the standings with 364 points, only eight behind more experienced teammate Rosenqvist.

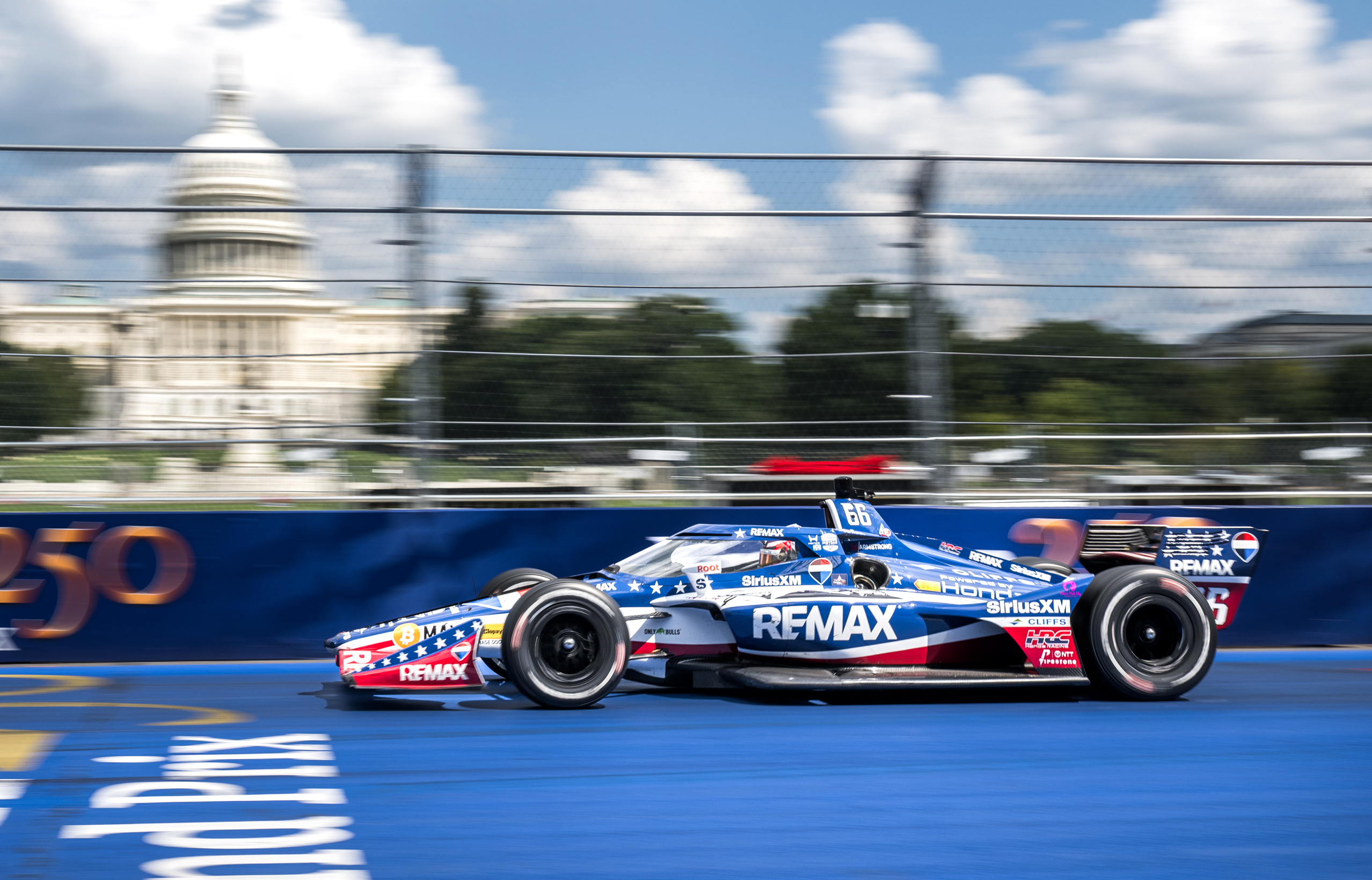
Armstrong competing in 2026 at the Freedom 250 Grand Prix

==== 2026 season ====
Armstrong extended his contract with Meyer Shank Racing for the 2026 season. He led the final lap of the Indianapolis 500, but finished 5th.

== Other racing ==
=== FIA World Endurance Championship ===
In November 2022, Armstrong tested an endurance racing car for the first time, testing the LMP2 Alpine car at the Bahrain International Circuit.

== Personal life ==
Armstrong hosts a motorsport and food related podcast titled Screaming Meals with motorsport insurance salesman James Harvey Blair, Formula 2 driver Clément Novalak, and IndyCar driver Callum Ilott. Growing up, Armstrong was a fan of 2007 Formula One World Champion Kimi Räikkönen.

== Karting record ==
=== Karting career summary ===
Season	Series	Team	Position
2010	Kartsport NZ National Sprint Championship — Cadet		14th
2011	Kartsport NZ Schools Championship — 100cc Junior Restricted		2nd
2011	Kartsport NZ National Sprint Championship — Cadet		1st
2012	SKUSA SuperNationals — S5 Junior	Aluminos	21st
2012	Kartsport NZ South Island Sprint Championship — 100cc Junior Yamaha		2nd
2012	Kartsport NZ Schools Championship — 100cc Junior Restricted		1st
2012	Kartsport NZ National Sprint Championship — 100cc Junior Restricted Yamaha		4th
2012	NZ Top Half Series — JR 100cc Yamaha		9th
2013	SKUSA SuperNationals — S5 Junior	Aluminos	3rd
2013	Kartsport NZ South Island Sprint Championship — 100cc Junior Yamaha		1st
2013	Kartsport NZ Schools Championship — 100cc Junior Yamaha		4th
2013	Kartsport NZ Schools Championship — Formula Junior		1st
2013	Kartsport NZ National Sprint Championship — 100cc Junior Yamaha		1st
2013	Rotax Max Challenge NZ — Junior		1st
2013	Rotax Max Challenge Grand Finals — Junior	Matthew Hamilton	52nd
2014	Kartsport NZ National Sprint Championship — Junior Rotax		1st
2014	Kartsport NZ National Sprint Championship — 100cc Junior Yamaha		3rd
2014	Rotax International Open — Junior		4th
2014	Rotax Euro Challenge — Junior	Dan Holland Racing	7th
2014	CIK-FIA World Championship — KFJ	Kosmic Racing Dept	22nd
2015	South Garda Winter Cup — KF	Tony Kart Racing Team	2nd
2015	WSK Champions Cup — KF	Tony Kart Racing Team	13th
2015	WSK Super Master Series — KF	Tony Kart Racing Team	6th
2015	CIK-FIA European Championship — KF	Tony Kart Racing Team	9th
2015	CIK-FIA World Championship — KF	Tony Kart Racing Team	12th
2015	WSK Final Cup — KF	Tony Kart Racing Team	8th
2016	WSK Champions Cup — KZ2	Tony Kart Racing Team	17th
2016	South Garda Winter Cup — KZ2	Tony Kart Racing Team	12th
2016	WSK Super Master Series — KZ	Tony Kart Racing Team	15th
2016	German Karting Championship — DSKM	Tony Kart Racing Team	9th
2016	CIK-FIA European Championship — KZ	Tony Kart Racing Team	15th
2016	CIK-FIA World Championship — KZ	Tony Kart Racing Team	15th
2016	WSK Final Cup — KZ2	Tony Kart Racing Team	18th
2022	Kartsport Auckland City of Sails — KZ2		22nd

== Racing record ==
=== Racing career summary ===
Season	Series	Team	Races	Wins	Poles	F/Laps	Podiums	Points	Position
2013–14	Toyota Finance 86 Championship	Neale Motorsport	7	0	0	0	0	316	8th
2014–15	Toyota Finance 86 Championship	Neale Motorsport	8	3	2	1	5	482	7th
2014–15	New Zealand Formula Ford Championship	N/A	3	1	1	0	2	0	NC†
2015–16	Toyota Finance 86 Championship	Neale Motorsport Auckland City Toyota	3	0	0	1	2	150	17th
2016	BRDC British Formula 3 Autumn Trophy	Double R Racing	3	0	0	1	0	0	NC†
2016	Eurocup Formula Renault 2.0	R-ace GP	2	0	0	0	0	0	NC†
2016	Formula Renault 2.0 NEC	R-ace GP	2	0	0	0	0	23	24th
2017	Italian F4 Championship	Prema Powerteam	21	4	6	0	13	283	**1st**
2017	ADAC Formula 4 Championship	Prema Powerteam	21	3	2	1	11	241	**2nd**
2017	Toyota Racing Series	M2 Competition	15	3	1	0	8	792	4th
2018	FIA Formula 3 European Championship	Prema Theodore Racing	30	1	3	3	10	260	5th
2018	Macau Grand Prix	SJM Theodore Racing by Prema	1	0	0	0	0	N/A	8th
2018	Toyota Racing Series	M2 Competition	15	2	1	1	10	901	**3rd**
2019	FIA Formula 3 Championship	Prema Racing	16	3	1	4	7	158	**2nd**
2019	Toyota Racing Series	M2 Competition	15	5	2	5	10	346	**2nd**
2019	Macau Grand Prix	SJM Theodore Racing by Prema	1	0	0	0	0	N/A	8th
2020	FIA Formula 2 Championship	ART Grand Prix	24	0	0	0	2	52	13th
2021	FIA Formula 2 Championship	DAMS	23	1	0	0	2	49	13th
2022	FIA Formula 2 Championship	Hitech Grand Prix	28	3	0	0	4	93	13th
2023	IndyCar Series	Chip Ganassi Racing	12	0	0	0	0	214	20th
2023	Macau Grand Prix	MP Motorsport	1	0	0	0	0	N/A	18th
2024	IndyCar Series	Chip Ganassi Racing	17	0	0	0	1	298	14th
2025	IndyCar Series	Meyer Shank Racing	17	0	0	0	1	364	8th
2026	IndyCar Series	Meyer Shank Racing with Curb-Agajanian	18	0	0	0	0	320	14th

^{†} As Armstrong was a guest driver, he was ineligible for points.
* Season still in progress.

=== Complete Toyota Finance 86 Championship results ===
(key) (Races in bold indicate pole position) (Races in italics indicate fastest lap)

Year	Team	1	2	3	4	5	6	7	8	9	10	11	12	13	14	15	16	17	18	19	Pos	Points
2013–14	Neale Motorsport	HGH; 1	HGH; 2	HGH; 3	PUK; 1	PUK; 2	PUK; 3	HMP; 1	HMP; 2	HMP; 3	MAN; 1	MAN; 2	MAN; 3	TAU; 1; 5	TAU; 2; 7	TAU; 3; 7	HMP; 1; 6	HMP; 2; 6	HMP; 3; 5	HMP; 4; 5	8th	321
2014–15	Neale Motorsport	TAU; 1; 9	TAU; 2; 6	TAU; 3; 1	PUK; 1 DNS	PUK; 2; 5	PUK; 3; 3	**RUA**; **1**; 1	RUA; 2; 2	RUA; 3; 1	TER; 1	TER; 2	TER; 3	MAN; 1	MAN; 2	MAN; 3	HMP; 1	HMP; 2	HMP; 3		7th	482
2015–16	Neale Motorsport Auckland City Toyota	PUK; 1	PUK; 2	PUK; 3	HMP; 1	HMP; 2	HMP; 3	RUA; 1; 11	RUA; 2; 3	RUA; 3; 3	TER; 1	TER; 2	TER; 3	MAN; 1	MAN; 2	MAN; 3	BRU; 1	BRU; 2	BRU; 3		17th	150

=== Complete Eurocup Formula Renault 2.0 results ===
(key) (Races in bold indicate pole position) (Races in italics indicate fastest lap)

Year	Team	1	2	3	4	5	6	7	8	9	10	11	12	13	14	15	Pos	Points
2016	R-ace GP	ALC; 1	ALC; 2	ALC; 3	MON; 1	MNZ; 1	MNZ; 2	MNZ; 1	RBR; 1	RBR; 2	LEC; 1	LEC; 2	SPA; 1	SPA; 2	EST; 1; 9	EST; 2; 10	NC†	0

^{†} As Armstrong was a guest driver, he was ineligible for points.

=== Complete Formula Renault 2.0 Northern European Cup results ===
(key) (Races in bold indicate pole position) (Races in italics indicate fastest lap)

Year	Team	1	2	3	4	5	6	7	8	9	10	11	12	13	14	15	DC	Points
2016	R-ace GP	MNZ; 1	MNZ; 2	SIL; 1	SIL; 2	HUN; 1	HUN; 2	SPA; 1	SPA; 2	ASS; 1	ASS; 2	NÜR; 1; 15	NÜR; 2; 4	HOC; 1	HOC; 2	HOC; 3	24th	23

=== Complete Toyota Racing Series results ===
(key) (Races in bold indicate pole position) (Races in italics indicate fastest lap)

Year	Team	1	2	3	4	5	6	7	8	9	10	11	12	13	14	15	16	17	DC	Points
2017	M2 Competition	RUA; 1; 1	RUA; 2; 3	RUA; 3 Ret	TER; 1; 11	TER; 2; 4	TER; 3; 4	HMP; 1; 1	HMP; 2; 4	HMP; 3 Ret	**TAU**; **1**; 2	TAU; 2; 4	TAU; 3; 1	MAN; 1; 3	MAN; 2; 2	MAN; 3; 2			4th	792
2018	M2 Competition	RUA; 1; 3	RUA; 2; 1	RUA; 3; 1	TER; 1; 3	TER; 2; 3	**TER**; **3**; 2	HMP; 1; 2	HMP; 2; 3	HMP; 3; 2	TAU; 1; 5	TAU; 2; 4	TAU; 3; 2	MAN; 1; 5	MAN; 2; 5	MAN; 3; 7			3rd	901
2019	M2 Competition	HIG; 1; 2	HIG; 2; 3	HIG; 3; 2	TER; 1; 1	TER; 2 C	TER; 3 C	HMP; 1; 10	**HMP**; **2**; 1	HMP; 3; 4	**HMP**; **4**; 1	TAU; 1; 3	TAU; 2 NC	TAU; 3; 8	TAU; 4; 1	MAN; 1; 1	MAN; 2; 9	MAN; 3; 2	2nd	346

=== Complete Italian F4 Championship results ===
(key) (Races in bold indicate pole position) (Races in italics indicate fastest lap)

Year	Team	1	2	3	4	5	6	7	8	9	10	11	12	13	14	15	16	17	18	19	20	21	Pos	Points
2017	Prema Powerteam	MIS; 1; 5	MIS; 2; 3	MIS; 3; 23	ADR; 1; 3	ADR; 2 Ret	ADR; 3; 3	VLL; 1; 2	**VLL**; **2**; 1	VLL; 3; 5	**MUG1**; **1**; 1	MUG1; 2; 2	MUG1; 3; 8	**IMO**; **1**; 1	IMO; 2; 4	IMO; 3; 3	MUG2; 1; 2	**MUG2**; **2**; 1	**MUG2**; **3**; 3	**MNZ**; **1**; 2	MNZ; 2; 4	MNZ; 3; 10	1st	283

=== Complete ADAC Formula 4 Championship results ===
(key) (Races in bold indicate pole position) (Races in italics indicate fastest lap)

Year	Team	1	2	3	4	5	6	7	8	9	10	11	12	13	14	15	16	17	18	19	20	21	Pos	Points
2017	Prema Powerteam	OSC1; 1; 9	OSC1; 2; 6	OSC1; 3 Ret	LAU; 1; 3	LAU; 2; 2	LAU; 3; 11	**RBR**; **1**; 1	**RBR**; **2**; 3	RBR; 3; 3	OSC2; 1; 1	OSC2; 2; 2	OSC2; 3; 6	NÜR; 1; 10	NÜR; 2; 8	NÜR; 3; 1	SAC; 1; 3	SAC; 2; 2	SAC; 3; 6	HOC; 1; 10	HOC; 2; 9	HOC; 3; 2	2nd	241

=== Complete FIA Formula 3 European Championship results ===
(key) (Races in bold indicate pole position) (Races in italics indicate fastest lap)

Year	Entrant	Engine	1	2	3	4	5	6	7	8	9	10	11	12	13	14	15	16	17	18	19	20	21	22	23	24	25	26	27	28	29	30	DC	Points
2018	Prema Theodore Racing	Mercedes	PAU; 1; 5	PAU; 2; 3	PAU; 3 Ret	HUN; 1 Ret	HUN; 2; 2	HUN; 3 Ret	**NOR**; **1**; 1	NOR; 2; 2	**NOR**; **3**; 3	ZAN; 1; 4	ZAN; 2; 2	ZAN; 3; 16	SPA; 1 Ret	SPA; 2; 6	SPA; 3; 3	SIL; 1; 6	SIL; 2; 5	SIL; 3 Ret	MIS; 1; 2	MIS; 2; 13	**MIS**; **3** Ret	NÜR; 1; 6	NÜR; 2; 4	NÜR; 3; 5	RBR; 1; 4	RBR; 2; 2	RBR; 3; 5	HOC; 1 Ret	HOC; 2 Ret	HOC; 3 Ret	5th	260

=== Complete New Zealand Grand Prix results ===
Year	Team	Car	Qualifying	Main race
2017	(New Zealand) M2 Competition	Tatuus FT-50 - Toyota	4th	**2nd**
2018	(New Zealand) M2 Competition	Tatuus FT-50 - Toyota	2nd	7th
2019	(New Zealand) M2 Competition	Tatuus FT-50 - Toyota	3rd	**2nd**

=== Complete Macau Grand Prix results ===
Year	Team	Car	Qualifying	Quali Race	Main race
2018	(Italy) SJM Theodore Racing by Prema	Dallara F317	8th	8th	8th
2019	(Italy) SJM Theodore Racing by Prema	Dallara F3 2019	9th	17th	8th
2023	(Netherlands) MP Motorsport	Dallara F3 2019	5th	22nd	18th

=== Complete FIA Formula 3 Championship results ===
(key) (Races in bold indicate pole position; races in italics indicate points for the fastest lap of top ten finishers)

Year	Entrant	1	2	3	4	5	6	7	8	9	10	11	12	13	14	15	16	DC	Points
2019	Prema Racing	CAT; FEA; 3	CAT; SPR; 5	LEC; FEA; 6	LEC; SPR; 6	**RBR**; **FEA**; 3	RBR; SPR; 19	SIL; FEA; 3	SIL; SPR; 4	HUN; FEA; 8	HUN; SPR; 1	SPA; FEA; 8	SPA; SPR; 1	MNZ; FEA; 21	MNZ; SPR; 14	SOC; FEA; 1	SOC; SPR; 2	2nd	158

=== Complete FIA Formula 2 Championship results ===
(key) (Races in bold indicate pole position) (Races in italics indicate points for the fastest lap of top ten finishers)

Year	Entrant	1	2	3	4	5	6	7	8	9	10	11	12	13	14	15	16	17	18	19	20	21	22	23	24	25	26	27	28	DC	Points
2020	ART Grand Prix	RBR; FEA; 2	RBR; SPR; Ret	RBR; FEA; 7	RBR; SPR; 3	HUN; FEA; Ret	HUN; SPR; 9	SIL; FEA; 16	SIL; SPR; 10	SIL; FEA; 14	SIL; SPR; 14	CAT; FEA; Ret	CAT; SPR; 15	SPA; FEA; 15	SPA; SPR; Ret	MNZ; FEA; 14	MNZ; SPR; 18	MUG; FEA; 9	MUG; SPR; 11	SOC; FEA; 9	SOC; SPR; 14	BHR; FEA; 7	BHR; SPR; 4	BHR; FEA; 11	BHR; SPR; 14					13th	52
2021	DAMS	BHR; SP1; Ret	BHR; SP2; 10	BHR; FEA; 5	MCO; SP1; 10	MCO; SP2; Ret	MCO; FEA; Ret	BAK; SP1; 7	BAK; SP2; Ret	BAK; FEA; Ret	SIL; SP1; 9	SIL; SP2; 2	SIL; FEA; 12	MNZ; SP1; 11	MNZ; SP2; 15	MNZ; FEA; 9	SOC; SP1; 11	SOC; SP2; C	SOC; FEA; 11	JED; SP1; 1	JED; SP2; Ret	JED; FEA; 8‡	YMC; SP1; 10	YMC; SP2; Ret	YMC; FEA; 7					13th	49
2022	Hitech Grand Prix	BHR; SPR; Ret	BHR; FEA; 5	JED; SPR; Ret	JED; FEA; 5	IMO; SPR; 1	IMO; FEA; 16	CAT; SPR; 10	CAT; FEA; 7	MCO; SPR; 3	MCO; FEA; 6	BAK; SPR; 4	BAK; FEA; 12	SIL; SPR; 9	SIL; FEA; 8	RBR; SPR; 1	RBR; FEA; Ret	LEC; SPR; 14	LEC; FEA; Ret	HUN; SPR; 7	HUN; FEA; 6	SPA; SPR; 7	SPA; FEA; 13	ZAN; SPR; 1	ZAN; FEA; 13	MNZ; SPR; 10	MNZ; FEA; 12	YMC; SPR; 10	YMC; FEA; 9	13th	93

^{‡} Half points awarded as less than 75% of race distance was completed.

=== American open-wheel racing results ===
==== IndyCar Series ====
(key) (Races in bold indicate pole position; races in italics indicate fastest lap)

Year	Team	No.	Chassis	Engine	1	2	3	4	5	6	7	8	9	10	11	12	13	14	15	16	17	18	Rank	Points	Ref
2023	Chip Ganassi Racing	11	Dallara DW12	Honda	STP; 11	TXS	LBH; 8	ALA; 11	IMS; 15	INDY	DET; 8	ROA; 24	MOH; 9	TOR; 7	IOW	IOW	NSH; 13	IMS; 24	GTW	POR; 19	LAG; 8		20th	214	
2024	Chip Ganassi Racing	11	Dallara DW12	Honda	STP; 25	THE; 5	LBH; 12	ALA; 9	IMS; 5	INDY; 30	DET; 3	ROA; 26	LAG; 22	MOH; 17	IOW; 10	IOW; 19	TOR; 5	GTW; 8	POR; 5	MIL; 21	MIL; 26	NSH; 7	14th	298	
2025	Meyer Shank Racing w/ Curb Agajanian	66	Dallara DW12	Honda	STP; 24	THE; 7	LBH; 14	ALA; 17	IMS; 7	INDY; 18	DET; 6	GTW; 9	ROA; 5	MOH; 7	IOW; 9	IOW; 3	TOR; 14	LAG; 8	POR; 8	MIL; 10	NSH; 19		8th	364	
2026	Meyer Shank Racing w/ Curb Agajanian	66	Dallara DW12	Honda	STP; 11	PHX; 5	ARL; 10	ALA; 6	LBH; 24	IMS; 11	INDY; 5	DET; 11	GTW; 9	ROA; 24	MOH; 14	NSH; 24	POR; 25	MRK; 16	WSH; 17	MIL; 9	MIL; 16	LAG; 7	14th	320	

==== Indianapolis 500 ====
Year	Chassis	Engine	Start	Finish	Team
2024	Dallara	Honda	16	30	Chip Ganassi Racing
2025	Dallara	Honda	30	18	Meyer Shank Racing
2026	Dallara	Honda	16	5	Meyer Shank Racing

Sporting positions
Preceded by Marcos Siebert	Italian F4 Championship; Champion; 2017	Succeeded by Enzo Fittipaldi
Preceded by Jehan Daruvala	Lady Wigram Trophy; Winner; 2018	Defunct
Preceded by Christian Lundgaard	IndyCar Series; Rookie of the Year; 2023	Succeeded by Linus Lundqvist
