= 2024 Big Machine Music City Grand Prix =

17th race of the 2024 IndyCar Series

(United States) 2024 Big Machine Music City Grand Prix
Race details
17th round of the 2024 IndyCar season
← Previous race
- Layout of the Nashville Superspeedway circuit
- Date: September 15, 2024
- Official name: Big Machine Music City Grand Prix
- Location: Nashville Superspeedway, Lebanon, Tennessee
- Course: Superspeedway; 1.330 mi / 2.140 km
- Distance: 206 laps 273.98 mi / 440.8 km

Pole position
- Driver: (United States) Kyle Kirkwood (Andretti Autosport)
- Time: 23.7702

Fastest lap
- Driver: (Mexico) Pato O'Ward (Arrow McLaren)
- Time: 24.2869 (on lap 165 of 206)

Podium
- First: (United States) Colton Herta (Andretti Global with Curb-Agajanian)
- Second: (Mexico) Pato O'Ward (Arrow McLaren)
- Third: (United States) Josef Newgarden (Team Penske)

Chronology
Previous	Next
2023	2025

The 2024 Big Machine Music City Grand Prix was the seventeenth and final round of the 2024 IndyCar season. The race was held on September 15, 2024, in Lebanon, Tennessee at the Nashville Superspeedway. Due to the construction of New Nissan Stadium, the race was moved from Nashville Street Circuit to Nashville Superspeedway, owned by Marcus Smith and his Speedway Motorsports group. This was the last IndyCar race aired on NBC. From 2025 onwards, the IndyCar series will be televised by Fox.

Following the race, Álex Palou would win the 2024 season championship.

== Entry list ==
Key	Meaning
R	Rookie
W	Past winner

No.	Driver	Team	Engine
2	(United States) Josef Newgarden	Team Penske	Chevrolet
3	(New Zealand) Scott McLaughlin	Team Penske	Chevrolet
4	(Cayman Islands) Kyffin Simpson R	Chip Ganassi Racing	Honda
5	(Mexico) Pato O'Ward	Arrow McLaren	Chevrolet
6	(United States) Nolan Siegel R	Arrow McLaren	Chevrolet
7	(United States) Alexander Rossi	Arrow McLaren	Chevrolet
8	(Sweden) Linus Lundqvist R	Chip Ganassi Racing	Honda
9	(New Zealand) Scott Dixon W	Chip Ganassi Racing	Honda
10	(Spain) Álex Palou	Chip Ganassi Racing	Honda
11	(New Zealand) Marcus Armstrong	Chip Ganassi Racing	Honda
12	(Australia) Will Power	Team Penske	Chevrolet
14	(United States) Santino Ferrucci	A.J. Foyt Enterprises	Chevrolet
15	(United States) Graham Rahal	Rahal Letterman Lanigan Racing	Honda
18	(United Kingdom) Jack Harvey	Dale Coyne Racing	Honda
20	(Denmark) Christian Rasmussen R	Ed Carpenter Racing	Chevrolet
21	(Netherlands) Rinus VeeKay	Ed Carpenter Racing	Chevrolet
26	(United States) Colton Herta	Andretti Global with Curb-Agajanian	Honda
27	(United States) Kyle Kirkwood W	Andretti Global	Honda
28	(Sweden) Marcus Ericsson W	Andretti Global	Honda
30	(Brazil) Pietro Fittipaldi	Rahal Letterman Lanigan Racing	Honda
41	(United States) Sting Ray Robb	A.J. Foyt Enterprises	Chevrolet
45	(Denmark) Christian Lundgaard	Rahal Letterman Lanigan Racing	Honda
51	(United Kingdom) Katherine Legge	Dale Coyne Racing with Rick Ware Racing	Honda
60	(Sweden) Felix Rosenqvist	Meyer Shank Racing	Honda
66	(United States) David Malukas	Meyer Shank Racing	Honda
77	(France) Romain Grosjean	Juncos Hollinger Racing	Chevrolet
78	(United States) Conor Daly	Juncos Hollinger Racing	Chevrolet

== Practice ==
=== Practice 1 ===
Top Practice Speeds
Pos	No.	Driver	Team	Engine	Lap Time
1	10	(Spain) Alex Palou	Chip Ganassi Racing	Honda	00:23.9565
2	9	(New Zealand) Scott Dixon W	Chip Ganassi Racing	Honda	00:23.9583
3	26	(United States) Colton Herta	Andretti Global with Curb-Agajanian	Honda	00:23.9776

== Qualifying ==
=== Qualifying Classification ===
Pos	No.	Driver	Team	Engine	Time		Final grid
Pos	No.	Driver	Team	Engine	Laps		Final grid
Pos	No.	Driver	Team	Engine	Lap 1	Lap 2	Final grid
1	27	(United States) Kyle Kirkwood W	Andretti Global	Honda	23.7487	23.7702	1
2	2	(United States) Josef Newgarden	Team Penske	Chevrolet	23.7518	23.8066	2
3	60	(Sweden) Felix Rosenqvist	Meyer Shank Racing	Honda	23.8360	23.8828	3
4	12	(Australia) Will Power	Team Penske	Chevrolet	23.8372	23.8929	4
5	14	(United States) Santino Ferrucci	A.J. Foyt Enterprises	Chevrolet	23.8550	23.9062	14
6	66	(United States) David Malukas	Meyer Shank Racing	Honda	23.8596	23.9061	5
7	78	(United States) Conor Daly	Juncos Hollinger Racing	Chevrolet	23.8745	23.9117	6
8	5	(Mexico) Pato O'Ward	Arrow McLaren	Chevrolet	23.8392	23.9705	7
9	3	(United States) Scott McLaughlin	Team Penske	Chevrolet	23.9057	23.9193	18
10	8	(Sweden) Linus Lundqvist R	Chip Ganassi Racing	Honda	23.8819	23.9567	8
11	26	(United States) Colton Herta	Andretti Global with Curb-Agajanian	Honda	23.9008	23.9543	9
12	21	(Netherlands) Rinus Veekay	Ed Carpenter Racing	Chevrolet	23.9679	23.9809	10
13	9	(New Zealand) Scott Dixon W	Chip Ganassi Racing	Honda	23.9694	23.9985	11
14	11	(New Zealand) Marcus Armstrong	Chip Ganassi Racing	Honda	23.9441	24.0337	12
15	10	(Spain) Alex Palou	Chip Ganassi Racing	Honda	23.8800	24.1124	24
16	77	(France) Romain Grosjean	Juncos Hollinger Racing	Chevrolet	23.9928	24.0141	13
17	20	(Denmark) Christian Rasmussen R	Ed Carpenter Racing	Chevrolet	24.0293	24.0560	25
18	28	(Sweden) Marcus Ericsson W	Andretti Global	Honda	24.0914	24.0541	15
19	30	(Brazil) Pietro Fittipaldi	Rahal Letterman Lanigan Racing	Honda	24.0633	24.0852	16
20	7	(United States) Alexander Rossi	Arrow McLaren	Chevrolet	24.1128	24.2361	26
21	4	(Cayman Islands) Kyffin Simpson R	Chip Ganassi Racing	Honda	24.3394	24.1915	17
22	15	(United States) Graham Rahal	Rahal Letterman Lanigan Racing	Honda	24.3788	24.4241	19
23	18	(United Kingdom) Jack Harvey	Dale Coyne Racing	Honda	24.5266	24.4538	20
24	45	(Denmark) Christian Lundgaard	Rahal Letterman Lanigan Racing	Honda	24.4946	24.4952	21
25	51	(United Kingdom) Katherine Legge	Dale Coyne Racing with Rick Ware Racing	Honda	24.9094	24.6864	22
26	41	(United States) Sting Ray Robb	A.J. Foyt Enterprises	Chevrolet	No time	No time	23
27	6	(United States) Nolan Siegel R	Arrow McLaren	Chevrolet	No time	No time	27

== Race ==
Coming into the race, 3 drivers were mathematically eligible to win the championship, Alex Palou, Will Power, and Scott McLaughlin. However, McLaughlin was eliminated from contention upon race start since Palou started the race. Early in the race, Will Power came to pit road after his seatbelts came loose, in essence eliminating him from the title fight. On lap 55, Felix Rosenqvist ran high out of Turn 2, hitting the wall and bringing out the first caution. He was eliminated from the race. On lap 85, Katherine Legge hit the wall coming out of Turn 4, bringing out the second caution and eliminating her from the race. On lap 137, the third and final caution of the race came out after Marcus Ericsson hit the wall in Turn 4, taking him out of the race.

At the end of the race, Colton Herta fought off a hard-charging Pato O'Ward, who was on a different strategy, to take the win. This was his first win on an oval track.

Points leader Alex Palou finished 11th, securing his 3rd IndyCar championship. Colton Herta would finish 2nd in the standings (–31), and Scott McLaughlin came 3rd (–39).

=== Race results ===
Pos	No.	Driver	Team	Engine	Laps	Total Time	Pit Stops	Grid	Laps Led	Pts.
1	26	(United States) Colton Herta	Andretti Global with Curb-Agajanian	Honda	206	01:43:15.2534	4	9	24	51
2	5	(Mexico) Pato O'Ward	Arrow McLaren	Chevrolet	206	01:43:17.0640	4	7	21	41
3	2	(United States) Josef Newgarden	Team Penske	Chevrolet	206	01:43:17.2145	4	2	54	36
4	27	(United States) Kyle Kirkwood W	Andretti Global	Honda	206	01:43:19.9709	3	1	67	36
5	3	(New Zealand) Scott McLaughlin	Team Penske	Chevrolet	206	01:43:23.0371	4	18	0	30
6	14	(United States) Santino Ferrucci	A.J. Foyt Enterprises	Chevrolet	206	01:43:24.4870	4	14	0	28
7	11	(New Zealand) Marcus Armstrong	Chip Ganassi Racing	Honda	206	01:43:29.6404	3	12	0	26
8	8	(Sweden) Linus Lundqvist R	Chip Ganassi Racing	Honda	206	01:43:29.9053	4	8	0	24
9	66	(United States) David Malukas	Meyer Shank Racing	Honda	206	01:43:30.5260	3	5	8	23
10	78	(United States) Conor Daly	Juncos Hollinger Racing	Chevrolet	205	+1 Lap	3	6	0	20
11	10	(Spain) Alex Palou	Chip Ganassi Racing	Honda	205	+1 Lap	4	24	0	19
12	21	(Netherlands) Rinus Veekay	Ed Carpenter Racing	Chevrolet	205	+1 Lap	4	10	0	18
13	18	(United Kingdom) Jack Harvey	Dale Coyne Racing	Honda	205	+1 Lap	3	20	0	17
14	20	(Denmark) Christian Rasmussen R	Ed Carpenter Racing	Chevrolet	205	+1 Lap	3	25	0	16
15	7	(United States) Alexander Rossi	Arrow McLaren	Chevrolet	205	+1 Lap	4	26	32	16
16	77	(France) Romain Grosjean	Juncos Hollinger Racing	Chevrolet	204	+2 Laps	4	13	0	14
17	9	(New Zealand) Scott Dixon W	Chip Ganassi Racing	Honda	204	+2 Laps	3	11	0	13
18	6	(United States) Nolan Siegel R	Arrow McLaren	Chevrolet	204	+2 Laps	4	27	0	12
19	45	(Denmark) Christian Lundgaard	Rahal Letterman Lanigan Racing	Honda	204	+2 Laps	4	21	0	11
20	41	(United States) Sting Ray Robb	A.J. Foyt Enterprises	Chevrolet	204	+2 Laps	3	23	0	10
21	30	(Brazil) Pietro Fittipaldi	Rahal Letterman Lanigan Racing	Honda	204	+2 Laps	5	16	0	9
22	4	(Cayman Islands) Kyffin Simpson R	Chip Ganassi Racing	Honda	202	+4 Laps	5	17	0	8
23	15	(United States) Graham Rahal	Rahal Letterman Lanigan Racing	Honda	202	+4 Laps	4	19	0	7
24	12	(Australia) Will Power	Team Penske	Chevrolet	198	+8 Laps	6	4	0	6
25	28	(Sweden) Marcus Ericsson W	Andretti Global	Honda	137	Contact	3	15	0	5
26	51	(United Kingdom) Katherine Legge	Dale Coyne Racing with Rick Ware Racing	Honda	85	Contact	2	22	0	5
27	60	(Sweden) Felix Rosenqvist	Meyer Shank Racing	Honda	55	Contact	0	3	0	5
Fastest lap: (Mexico) Pato O'Ward (Arrow McLaren) – 24.2869 (lap 165)
