= 2017 New Zealand Grand Prix =

- Race 3, Round 5 of 5 of the 2017 Toyota Racing Series

Race details
- Date: 12 February 2017
- Official name: LXII New Zealand Grand Prix
- Location: Circuit Chris Amon, Feilding, New Zealand
- Course: Permanent racing facility
- Course length: 3.033 km (1.885 miles)
- Distance: 35 laps, 106.16 km (65.96 miles)
- Weather: Fine

Pole position
Driver	(India) Jehan Daruvala	M2 Competition
- Time: 1:02.258

Fastest lap
Driver	(Australia) Thomas Randle	Victory Motor Racing
- Time: 1:03.426 on lap 14

Podium
First	(India) Jehan Daruvala	M2 Competition
Second	(New Zealand) Marcus Armstrong	M2 Competition
Third	(Australia) Thomas Randle	Victory Motor Racing

The 2017 New Zealand Grand Prix event for open wheel racing cars was held at Circuit Chris Amon near Feilding on 12 February 2017. It was the sixty-second New Zealand Grand Prix and fielded Toyota Racing Series cars. The event was also the third race of the fifth round of the 2017 Toyota Racing Series, the final race of the series.

== Report ==
=== Practice ===
Session	Day	Fastest lap			
Session	Day	No.	Driver	Team	Time
Practice 1	Thursday	5	(Brazil) Pedro Piquet	M2 Competition	1:03.244
Practice 2	Thursday	22	(Netherlands) Richard Verschoor	Giles Motorsport	1:03.122
Practice 3	Friday	49	(Australia) Thomas Randle	Victory Motor Racing	1:02.826
Practice 4	Friday	65	(United Kingdom) Enaam Ahmed	Giles Motorsport	1:02.878
Practice 5	Friday	49	(Australia) Thomas Randle	Victory Motor Racing	1:02.416

=== Race 1 ===
==== Qualifying ====
Pos	No	Driver	Team	Lap	Grid
1	9	(India) Jehan Daruvala	M2 Competition	1:02.474	1
2	5	(Brazil) Pedro Piquet	M2 Competition	1:02.546	2
3	8	(New Zealand) Marcus Armstrong	M2 Competition	1:02.553	3
4	22	(Netherlands) Richard Verschoor	Giles Motorsport	1:02.662	4
5	26	(Australia) Harry Hayek	Giles Motorsport	1:02.706	5
6	49	(Australia) Thomas Randle	Victory Motor Racing	1:02.730	6
7	65	(United Kingdom) Enaam Ahmed	Giles Motorsport	1:02.951	7
8	11	(New Zealand) Taylor Cockerton	MTEC Motorsport	1:02.981	8
9	47	(Germany) Keyvan Andres Soori	Giles Motorsport	1:02.982	9
10	3	(New Zealand) Brendon Leitch	Victory Motor Racing	1:02.992	10
11	83	(Canada) Kami Laliberté	M2 Competition	1:03.061	11
12	96	(Australia) Luis Leeds	Giles Motorsport	1:03.074	12
13	51	(United States) Shelby Blackstock	Victory Motor Racing	1:03.096	13
14	62	(Austria) Ferdinand Habsburg	M2 Competition	1:03.128	14
15	24	(India) Ameya Vaidyanathan	MTEC Motorsport	1:03.280	15
16	27	(France) Jean Baptiste Simmenauer	M2 Competition	1:03.357	16
17	12	(Brazil) Christian Hahn	Giles Motorsport	1:03.376	17
18	80	(Russia) Nikita Lastochkin	Victory Motor Racing	1:03.506	18
19	33	(United States) Kory Enders	MTEC Motorsport	1:03.635	19
-	10	(France) Thomas Neubauer	MTEC Motorsport	no time	-

==== Race ====
Pos	No	Driver	Team	Laps	Time / Retired	Grid
1	5	(Brazil) Pedro Piquet	M2 Competition	20	22min 08.872sec	3
2	9	(India) Jehan Daruvala	M2 Competition	20	+ 3.453 s	1
3	9	(New Zealand) Marcus Armstrong	M2 Competition	20	+ 4.590 s	1
4	22	(Netherlands) Richard Verschoor	Giles Motorsport	20	+ 6.529 s	1
5	49	(Australia) Thomas Randle	Victory Motor Racing	20	+ 7.689 s	1
6	65	(United Kingdom) Enaam Ahmed	Giles Motorsport	20	+ 14.397 s	1
7	11	(New Zealand) Taylor Cockerton	MTEC Motorsport	20	+ 14.688 s	1
8	62	(Austria) Ferdinand Habsburg	M2 Competition	20	+ 15.528 s	1
9	96	(Australia) Luis Leeds	Giles Motorsport	20	+ 17.596 s	1
10	51	(United States) Shelby Blackstock	Victory Motor Racing	20	+ 21.194 s	1
11	12	(Brazil) Christian Hahn	Giles Motorsport	20	+ 21.561 s	1
12	33	(United States) Kory Enders	MTEC Motorsport	20	+ 22.634 s	1
13	83	(Canada) Kami Laliberté	M2 Competition	20	+ 25.708 s	1
14	24	(India) Ameya Vaidyanathan	MTEC Motorsport	20	+ 25.946 s	1
15	27	(France) Jean Baptiste Simmenauer	M2 Competition	20	+ 26.552 s	1
16	10	(France) Thomas Neubauer	MTEC Motorsport	20	+ 26.958 s	1
17	80	(Russia) Nikita Lastochkin	Victory Motor Racing	20	+ 27.690 s	1
18	26	(Australia) Harry Hayek	Giles Motorsport	16	+ 4 laps	1
19	47	(Germany) Keyvan Andres Soori	Giles Motorsport	16	+ 4 laps	1
Ret	3	(New Zealand) Brendon Leitch	Victory Motor Racing	1	Accident	1
Fastest Lap: Thomas Randle (Victory Motor Racing) – 1:02.929

=== Race 2 ===
Pos	No	Driver	Team	Laps	Time / Retired	Grid
1	22	(Netherlands) Richard Verschoor	Giles Motorsport	15	22min 08.872sec	3
2	8	(New Zealand) Marcus Armstrong	M2 Competition	15	+ 0.830 s	1
3	5	(Brazil) Pedro Piquet	M2 Competition	15	+ 3.316 s	1
4	49	(Australia) Thomas Randle	Victory Motor Racing	15	+ 6.587 s	1
5	62	(Austria) Ferdinand Habsburg	M2 Competition	15	+ 6.705 s	1
6	11	(New Zealand) Taylor Cockerton	MTEC Motorsport	15	+ 6.906 s	1
7	9	(India) Jehan Daruvala	M2 Competition	15	+ 7.856 s	1
8	3	(New Zealand) Brendon Leitch	Victory Motor Racing	15	+ 7.993 s	1
9	96	(Australia) Luis Leeds	Giles Motorsport	15	+ 8.767 s	1
10	27	(France) Jean Baptiste Simmenauer	M2 Competition	15	+ 9.159 s	1
11	24	(India) Ameya Vaidyanathan	MTEC Motorsport	15	+ 10.557 s	1
12	47	(Germany) Keyvan Andres Soori	Victory Motor Racing	15	+ 10.560 s	1
13	51	(United States) Shelby Blackstock	Victory Motor Racing	15	+ 12.599 s	1
14	80	(Russia) Nikita Lastochkin	Victory Motor Racing	15	+ 13.115 s	1
15	12	(Brazil) Christian Hahn	Giles Motorsport	14	+ 1 lap	1
16	10	(France) Thomas Neubauer	MTEC Motorsport	14	+ 1 lap	1
17	26	(Australia) Harry Hayek	Giles Motorsport	14	+ 1 lap	1
Ret	83	(Canada) Kami Laliberté	M2 Competition	5	Retired	1
Ret	65	(United Kingdom) Enaam Ahmed	Giles Motorsport	1	Retired	1
Ret	33	(United States) Kory Enders	MTEC Motorsport	1	Retired	1
Fastest Lap: Thomas Randle (Victory Motor Racing) – 1:03.438

=== Race 3 ===
==== Qualifying ====
Pos	No	Driver	Team	Lap	Grid
1	9	(India) Jehan Daruvala	M2 Competition	1:02.258	1
2	5	(Brazil) Pedro Piquet	M2 Competition	1:02.299	2
3	49	(Australia) Thomas Randle	Victory Motor Racing	1:02.324	3
4	8	(New Zealand) Marcus Armstrong	M2 Competition	1:02.384	4
5	22	(Netherlands) Richard Verschoor	Giles Motorsport	1:02.440	5
6	47	(Germany) Keyvan Andres Soori	Giles Motorsport	1:02.478	6
7	3	(New Zealand) Brendon Leitch	Victory Motor Racing	1:02.509	7
8	65	(United Kingdom) Enaam Ahmed	Giles Motorsport	1:02.643	8
9	11	(New Zealand) Taylor Cockerton	MTEC Motorsport	1:02.665	9
10	26	(Australia) Harry Hayek	Giles Motorsport	1:02.672	10
11	62	(Austria) Ferdinand Habsburg	M2 Competition	1:02.681	11
12	10	(France) Thomas Neubauer	MTEC Motorsport	1:02.715	12
13	83	(Canada) Kami Laliberté	M2 Competition	1:02.734	13
14	24	(India) Ameya Vaidyanathan	MTEC Motorsport	1:02.856	14
15	27	(France) Jean Baptiste Simmenauer	M2 Competition	1:02.965	15
16	51	(United States) Shelby Blackstock	Victory Motor Racing	1:02.976	16
17	96	(Australia) Luis Leeds	Giles Motorsport	1:03.078	17
18	12	(Brazil) Christian Hahn	Giles Motorsport	1:03.174	18
19	33	(United States) Kory Enders	MTEC Motorsport	1:03.307	19
20	80	(Russia) Nikita Lastochkin	Victory Motor Racing	1:03.508	20

==== Race ====
Daruvala led a flag-to-finish victory to win his first New Zealand Grand Prix and become the first Indian to do so. Marcus Armstrong finished a strong second, staying in contention for most of the race. Thomas Randle finished third and in doing so, won the 2017 Toyota Racing Series championship, with a five-point margin over nearest contender, Pedro Piquet. The first lap saw a major incident where Christian Hahn and Luis Leeds collided at turn seven - causing the former to roll and crash heavily.

Pos	No	Driver	Team	Laps	Time / Retired	Grid
1	9	(India) Jehan Daruvala	M2 Competition	35	38min 43.048sec	3
2	8	(New Zealand) Marcus Armstrong	M2 Competition	35	+ 0.855 s	1
3	49	(Australia) Thomas Randle	Victory Motor Racing	35	+ 1.213 s	1
4	5	(Brazil) Pedro Piquet	M2 Competition	35	+ 2.304 s	1
5	22	(Netherlands) Richard Verschoor	Giles Motorsport	35	+ 8.142 s	1
6	65	(United Kingdom) Enaam Ahmed	Giles Motorsport	35	+ 16.641 s	1
7	62	(Austria) Ferdinand Habsburg	M2 Competition	35	+ 20.531 s	1
8	47	(Germany) Keyvan Andres Soori	Giles Motorsport	35	+ 23.483 s	1
9	26	(Australia) Harry Hayek	Giles Motorsport	35	+ 23.987 s	1
10	11	(New Zealand) Taylor Cockerton	MTEC Motorsport	35	+ 24.846 s	1
11	24	(India) Ameya Vaidyanathan	MTEC Motorsport	35	+ 25.600 s	1
12	51	(United States) Shelby Blackstock	Victory Motor Racing	35	+ 25.982 s	1
13	83	(Canada) Kami Laliberté	M2 Competition	35	+ 27.439 s	1
14	10	(France) Thomas Neubauer	MTEC Motorsport	35	+ 28.758 s	1
15	33	(United States) Kory Enders	MTEC Motorsport	35	+ 29.449 s	1
16	80	(Russia) Nikita Lastochkin	Victory Motor Racing	35	+ 38.638 s	1
17	27	(France) Jean Baptiste Simmenauer	M2 Competition	35	+ 54.619 s	1
18	3	(New Zealand) Brendon Leitch	Victory Motor Racing	32	+ 3 laps	1
Ret	96	(Australia) Luis Leeds	Giles Motorsport	0	Accident	1
Ret	12	(Brazil) Christian Hahn	Giles Motorsport	0	Accident	1
Fastest Lap: Thomas Randle (Victory Motor Racing) – 1:03.426

== Championship standings ==
Drivers' Championship standings

Pos.	Driver	Points
1	(Australia) Thomas Randle	855
2	(Brazil) Pedro Piquet	850
3	(Netherlands) Richard Verschoor	843
4	(New Zealand) Marcus Armstrong	792
5	(India) Jehan Daruvala	781

Preceded by 2017 Taupo TRS round	Toyota Racing Series; 2017	Succeeded by end of season
Preceded by 2016 New Zealand Grand Prix	New Zealand Grand Prix; 2017	Succeeded by 2018 New Zealand Grand Prix
