= 2018 Toyota Racing Series =

Motor racing competition

The 2018 Castrol Toyota Racing Series was the fourteenth running of the Toyota Racing Series, the premier open-wheel motorsport category held in New Zealand. The series consisted of fifteen races at five meetings. It began on 13 January at Ruapuna Park in Christchurch, and concluded on 11 February with the 63rd running of the New Zealand Grand Prix, at Circuit Chris Amon in Feilding.

M2 Competition driver Robert Shwartzman won the title, being the only driver who finished in the top-five every race of the season. His teammates (and series returnees) Richard Verschoor and Marcus Armstrong had more podium finishes and race wins, but were not as consistent as Shwartzman. Another M2 driver Juan Manuel Correa raced his first season in the series, but was not considered as a rookie due to his GP3 Series experience, and he won races at Teretonga and Taupō; he finished fourth in the standings. Giles Motorsport driver Clément Novalak was the highest placed rookie who conformed series regulations, winning races at Teretonga and Hampton Downs and completed the top-five in the championship.

== Teams and drivers ==
Team	No.	Driver	Status	Rounds
Giles Motorsport	4	(New Zealand) Reid Harker	R	All
Giles Motorsport	17	(United Kingdom) Clément Novalak	R	All
MTEC Motorsport	5	(New Zealand) Ryan Yardley	R	All
MTEC Motorsport	11	(New Zealand) Taylor Cockerton		All
MTEC Motorsport	52	(France) Charles Milesi	(Note: Under the series' sporting regulations, not considered as Rookie because of his previous racing experience)	All
M2 Competition	7	(Netherlands) Richard Verschoor		All
M2 Competition	9	(New Zealand) Marcus Armstrong		All
M2 Competition	15	(United Kingdom) James Pull		All
M2 Competition	35	(Russia) Robert Shwartzman		All
M2 Competition	68	(United States) Juan Manuel Correa		All
Victory Motor Racing	28	(United States) Cameron Das		All
Victory Motor Racing	44	(Guyana) Calvin Ming	R	1–3
Victory Motor Racing	47	(New Zealand) Ken Smith		5
Victory Motor Racing	86	(New Zealand) Brendon Leitch		All

== Race calendar and results ==
The calendar for the series was announced on 22 June 2017, and was held over five successive weekends in January and February.

Round		Date	Circuit	Pole position	Fastest lap	Winning driver	Winning team	Round winner(s)	Report
1	R1	13 January	Mike Pero Motorsport Park, Christchurch	(Russia) Robert Shwartzman	(Russia) Robert Shwartzman	(Netherlands) Richard Verschoor	M2 Competition	(New Zealand) Marcus Armstrong	Report
1	R2	14 January	Mike Pero Motorsport Park, Christchurch		(Netherlands) Richard Verschoor	(New Zealand) Marcus Armstrong	M2 Competition	(New Zealand) Marcus Armstrong	Report
1	R3	14 January	Mike Pero Motorsport Park, Christchurch	(Russia) Robert Shwartzman	(New Zealand) Marcus Armstrong	(New Zealand) Marcus Armstrong	M2 Competition	(New Zealand) Marcus Armstrong	Report
2	R1	20 January	Teretonga Park, Invercargill	(United Kingdom) Clément Novalak	(United Kingdom) Clément Novalak	(Netherlands) Richard Verschoor	M2 Competition	(New Zealand) Marcus Armstrong	Report
2	R2	21 January	Teretonga Park, Invercargill		(United Kingdom) Clément Novalak	(United States) Juan Manuel Correa	M2 Competition	(New Zealand) Marcus Armstrong	Report
2	R3	21 January	Teretonga Park, Invercargill	(New Zealand) Marcus Armstrong	(United Kingdom) Clément Novalak	(United Kingdom) Clément Novalak	Giles Motorsport	(New Zealand) Marcus Armstrong	Report
3	R1	27 January	Hampton Downs Motorsport Park, Waikato	(Netherlands) Richard Verschoor	(Netherlands) Richard Verschoor	(Netherlands) Richard Verschoor	M2 Competition	(Netherlands) Richard Verschoor	Report
3	R2	28 January	Hampton Downs Motorsport Park, Waikato		(United States) Juan Manuel Correa	(United Kingdom) Clément Novalak	Giles Motorsport	(Netherlands) Richard Verschoor	Report
3	R3	28 January	Hampton Downs Motorsport Park, Waikato	(Netherlands) Richard Verschoor	(Russia) Robert Shwartzman	(Netherlands) Richard Verschoor	M2 Competition	(Netherlands) Richard Verschoor	Report
4	R1	3 February	Bruce McLaren Motorsport Park, Taupō	(United States) Juan Manuel Correa	(United States) Juan Manuel Correa	(United States) Juan Manuel Correa	M2 Competition	(Netherlands) Richard Verschoor	Report
4	R2	4 February	Bruce McLaren Motorsport Park, Taupō		(New Zealand) Brendon Leitch	(New Zealand) Brendon Leitch	Victory Motor Racing	(Netherlands) Richard Verschoor	Report
4	R3	4 February	Bruce McLaren Motorsport Park, Taupō	(Russia) Robert Shwartzman	(Russia) Robert Shwartzman	(Russia) Robert Shwartzman	M2 Competition	(Netherlands) Richard Verschoor	Report
5	R1	10 February	Circuit Chris Amon, Feilding	(Netherlands) Richard Verschoor	(Netherlands) Richard Verschoor	(Netherlands) Richard Verschoor	M2 Competition	(Netherlands) Richard Verschoor	Report
5	R2	11 February	Circuit Chris Amon, Feilding		(New Zealand) Brendon Leitch	(New Zealand) Brendon Leitch	Victory Motor Racing	(Netherlands) Richard Verschoor	Report
5	R3	11 February	Circuit Chris Amon, Feilding	(Netherlands) Richard Verschoor	(Netherlands) Richard Verschoor	(Netherlands) Richard Verschoor	M2 Competition	(Netherlands) Richard Verschoor	Report

== Championship standings ==
In order for a driver to score championship points, they have to complete at least 75% of the race winner's distance, and be running at the race's completion. All races counted towards the final championship standings.

Scoring system

Position	1st	2nd	3rd	4th	5th	6th	7th	8th	9th	10th	11th	12th	13th	14th	15th	16th	17th	18th	19th	20th
Points	75	67	60	54	49	45	42	39	36	33	30	28	26	24	22	20	18	16	14	12

=== Drivers' championship ===
Pos.	Driver	RUA			TER			HMP			TAU			MAN			Points
1	(Russia) Robert Shwartzman	**2**	3	**2**	2	4	4	4	2	3	4	5	**1**	2	4	2	916
2	(Netherlands) Richard Verschoor	1	2	Ret	1	6	3	**1**	5	**1**	3	3	3	**1**	3	**1**	911
3	(New Zealand) Marcus Armstrong	3	1	1	3	3	**2**	2	3	2	5	4	2	5	5	7	901
4	(United States) Juan Manuel Correa	10	6	8	6	1	7	3	4	4	**1**	9	4	6	6	4	756
5	(United Kingdom) Clément Novalak	4	10	6	**4**	5	1	5	1	9	10	10	Ret	3	2	6	711
6	(United Kingdom) James Pull	5	11	3	5	2	6	7	7	5	2	8	7	8	8	10	692
7	(New Zealand) Brendon Leitch	12	Ret	4	7	8	5	9	6	Ret	8	1	5	4	1	5	634
8	(New Zealand) Reid Harker	8	8	12	8	13	10	6	9	12	6	7	12	9	9	9	538
9	(New Zealand) Ryan Yardley	13	9	9	12	11	13	13	10	11	7	2	9	7	12	8	525
10	(New Zealand) Taylor Cockerton	6	4	11	11	10	12	8	8	10	9	6	9	10	10	Ret	514
11	(France) Charles Milesi	9	7	5	13	12	11	10	Ret	6	11	12	8	12	11	3	504
12	(United States) Cameron Das	11	Ret	7	9	7	8	11	Ret	7	Ret	11	6	11	7	11	438
13	(Guyana) Calvin Ming	7	5	10	10	9	9	12	11	10							320
14	(New Zealand) Ken Smith													13	13	12	80
Pos.	Driver	RUA			TER			HMP			TAU			MAN			Points

Colour	Result
Gold	Winner
Silver	Second place
Bronze	Third place
Green	Points classification
Blue	Non-points classification
Blue	Non-classified finish (NC)
Purple	Retired, not classified (Ret)
Red	Did not qualify (DNQ)
Red	Did not pre-qualify (DNPQ)
Black	Disqualified (DSQ)
White	Did not start (DNS)
White	Withdrew (WD)
White	Race cancelled (C)
Blank	Did not practice (DNP)
Blank	Did not arrive (DNA)
Blank	Excluded (EX)

**Bold** – Pole
Italics – Fastest Lap

Rookie
