= Calvin Ming =

Guyanese racing driver

- Nationality: Guyanese
- Born: 25 July 1996 (age 30) Georgetown, Guyana

Toyota Racing Series career
- Debut season: 2018
- Current team: Victory Motor Racing
- Car number: 44
- Starts: 9 (9 entries)
- Wins: 0
- Podiums: 0
- Poles: 0
- Fastest laps: 0
- Best finish: 13th in 2018

Previous series
- 2015–2016 2015–2017 2017–2018 2019: F1600 Championship Series; NACAM Formula 4 Championship; U.S. F2000 National Championship; Radical SR3 Caribbean Cup

Championship titles
- 2016–17: NACAM Formula 4 Championship

Calvin Stanley Ming (born July 25, 1996) is a Guyanese former racing driver.

== Biography ==
Ming began his career at the age of six, when his father Stanley – a former motorcycle racer – bought him a go-kart for his birthday. Having competed in karting across the Caribbean, he relocated to Florida in 2015 to pursue a career in cars. He made his début in U.S. F1600, and simultaneously began testing in Formula 4 with a view to contesting the Mexican championship – completing an exhibition at the South Dakota Circuit in Guyana in an effort to garner local sponsorship.

Ming won the NACAM F4 Championship on his second attempt in a campaign that saw him win a race supporting the 2016 Mexican Grand Prix. Following this, Ming secured a promotion to the U.S. F2000 National Championship on the Road to Indy ladder, and after scoring six podiums in 28 races he fell back to regional racing after a handful of outings in the Toyota Racing Series in New Zealand.

Following multiple years out of the sport, Ming returned to racing at the 2024 Games of the Future in Sochi, Russia, finishing sixth in the Formula 4 class alongside team-mate Cristian Cantú.

Ming was also a national Junior Chess Champion.

== Racing record ==
=== Career summary ===
Season	Series	Team	Races	Wins	Poles	F/Laps	Podiums	Points	Position
2015	F1600 Championship Series	?	3	0	0	0	1	70	25th
2015–16	NACAM Formula 4 Championship	Ming Guyana	6	0	0	0	0	80	11th
2015–16	NACAM Formula 4 Championship	Ram Racing	9	0	0	0	2	80	11th
2016	F1600 Championship Series	Team Pelfrey	21	3	1	3	11	714	4th
2016–17	NACAM Formula 4 Championship	Ram Racing	23	8	6	5	18	399	1st
2017	U.S. F2000 National Championship	Pabst Racing Services	14	0	0	1	4	207	5th
2018	Toyota Racing Series	Victory Motor Racing	9	0	0	0	0	320	13th
2018	U.S. F2000 National Championship	Pabst Racing Services	14	0	0	0	2	206	5th
2019	Radical SR3 Caribbean Cup		?	?	?	?	?	?	?
