= 2023 Macau Grand Prix =

Formula Three motor race

Race details
- Date: 19 November 2023
- Official name: 70th Macau Grand Prix – FIA F3 World Cup
- Location: Guia Circuit, Macau
- Course: Temporary street circuit
- Course length: 6.120 km (3.803 mi)
- Distance: 15 laps, 91.800 km (57.042 mi)
- Weather: Dry and clear

Pole position
Driver	(United Kingdom) Luke Browning	Hitech Pulse-Eight

Fastest lap
Driver	(United Kingdom) Luke Browning	Hitech Pulse-Eight
- Time: 2:06.647 on lap 7

Podium
First	(United Kingdom) Luke Browning	Hitech Pulse-Eight
Second	(Norway) Dennis Hauger	MP Motorsport
Third	(Italy) Gabriele Minì	SJM Theodore Prema Racing

The 2023 Macau Grand Prix (formally the 70th Macau Grand Prix – FIA F3 World Cup) was a motor race for Formula Three cars held on the streets of Macau on 19 November 2023. The Macau Grand Prix served as a non-championship round of the FIA Formula 3 Championship. The race itself was made up of two races: a ten-lap qualifying race that decided the starting grid for the fifteen-lap main event. The 2023 race was the 70th running of the Macau Grand Prix, the 38th for Formula Three cars and the fifth edition of the FIA F3 World Cup.

== Background and entry list ==
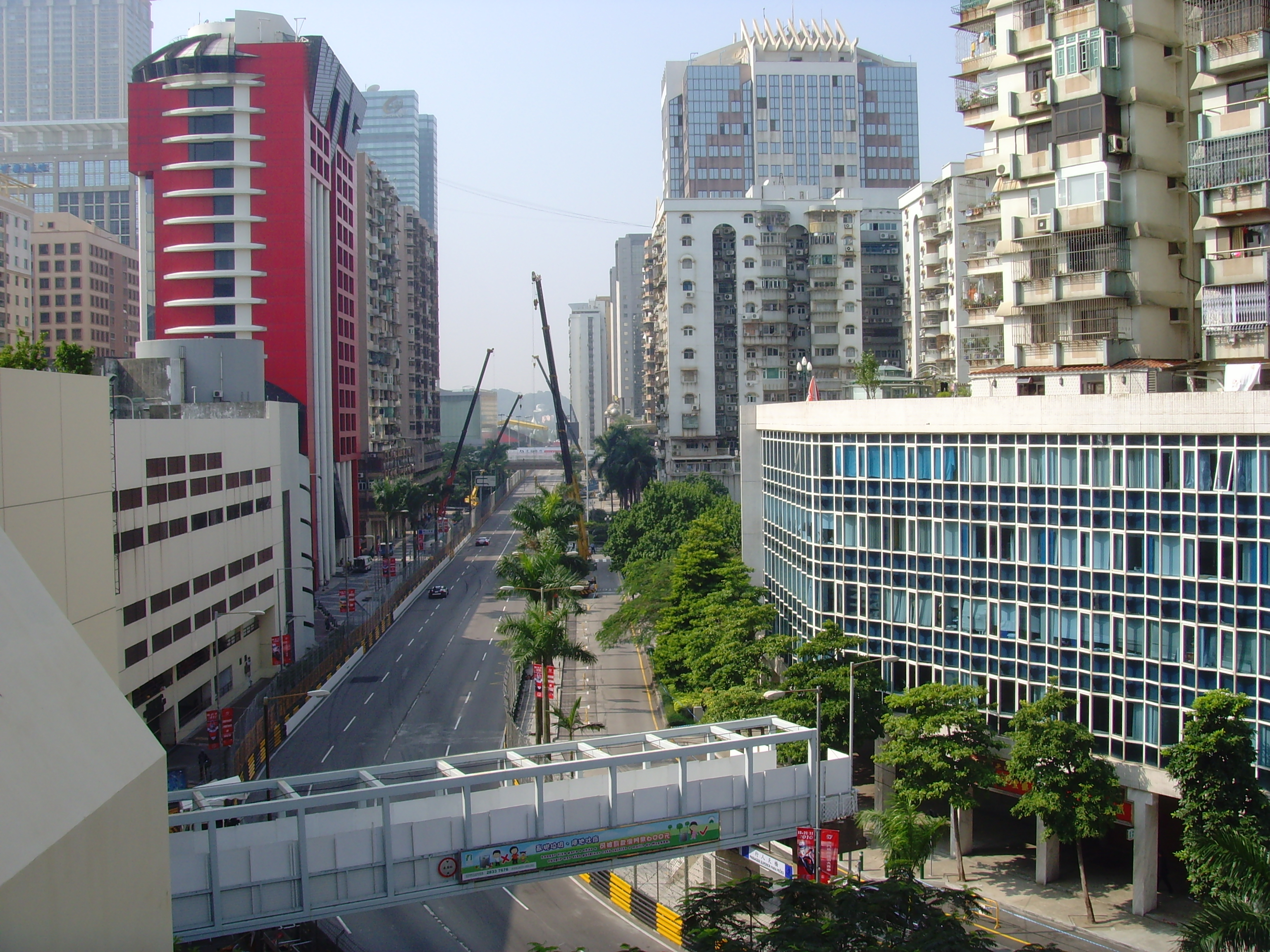
The Guia Circuit, where the race has been held

The Macau Grand Prix is a race considered by drivers as a stepping stone to higher motor racing categories such as Formula One, and is Macau's most prestigious international sporting event. The event was made a non-championship round of the FIA Formula 3 Championship for the first time in 2019, before the COVID-19 pandemic caused heavy disruptions, particularly concerning entry of foreign drivers into Macau. This caused the race to be held as a domestic Formula 4 event for three years, serving as a round of the Chinese Formula 4 Championship.

In 2023, Formula 3 and other international series returned to the streets of Macau. As the Grand Prix celebrated its 70th anniversary, the organizers expanded the event over two weekends, with the first weekend seeing mainly domestic and Asian series, while the high-profile international series and the Formula 3 title race were held over the second weekend.

=== Entry list ===
All competitors used an identical Dallara F3 2019 chassis with a 3.4 L (207 cu in) naturally-aspirated V6 engine developed by Mecachrome. All teams competed with tyres supplied by Pirelli.

Team	No.	Driver
(Italy) Trident Motorsport	1	(Netherlands) Richard Verschoor
(Italy) Trident Motorsport	2	(Czech Republic) Roman Staněk
(Italy) Trident Motorsport	3	(United States) Ugo Ugochukwu
(Switzerland) Jenzer Motorsport	5	(United States) Max Esterson
(Switzerland) Jenzer Motorsport	6	(Austria) Charlie Wurz
(Switzerland) Jenzer Motorsport	7	(Peru) Matías Zagazeta
(Hong Kong) SJM Theodore Prema Racing	8	(Sweden) Dino Beganovic
(Hong Kong) SJM Theodore Prema Racing	9	(Italy) Gabriele Minì
(Hong Kong) SJM Theodore Prema Racing	10	(Estonia) Paul Aron
(United Kingdom) Hitech Pulse-Eight	11	(United Kingdom) Luke Browning
(United Kingdom) Hitech Pulse-Eight	12	(France) Isack Hadjar
(United Kingdom) Hitech Pulse-Eight	14	(Republic of Ireland) Alex Dunne
(Spain) Campos Racing	15	(Spain) Pepe Martí
(Spain) Campos Racing	16	(Colombia) Sebastián Montoya
(Spain) Campos Racing	17	(Germany) Oliver Goethe
(Netherlands) Van Amersfoort Racing	18	(Mexico) Noel León
(Netherlands) Van Amersfoort Racing	19	(Germany) Sophia Flörsch
(Netherlands) Van Amersfoort Racing	20	(Australia) Tommy Smith
(France) ART Grand Prix	21	(Netherlands) Laurens van Hoepen
(France) ART Grand Prix	22	(Australia) Christian Mansell
(France) ART Grand Prix	23	(Bulgaria) Nikola Tsolov
(United Kingdom) Rodin Carlin	24	(Barbados) Zane Maloney
(United Kingdom) Rodin Carlin	25	(United Kingdom) Dan Ticktum
(Netherlands) MP Motorsport	27	(Norway) Dennis Hauger
(Netherlands) MP Motorsport	28	(Spain) Mari Boya
(Netherlands) MP Motorsport	29	(New Zealand) Marcus Armstrong

=== Team changes ===
- Regular season entry PHM Racing by Charouz confirmed they would not take part in the event whilst they completed their takeover of the Charouz entry.

=== Driver changes ===
- Trident Racing and Jenzer Motorsport entered the event with completely different rosters from the regular season. 2019 Macau Grand Prix winner Richard Verschoor, Formula 2 driver Roman Staněk and reigning Euro 4 champion Ugo Ugochukwu competed for Trident; former Carlin driver Max Esterson, and FRECA drivers Charlie Wurz and Matías Zagazeta drove for Jenzer.
- Prema Racing retained Dino Beganovic and Paul Aron, and brought across Alpine Academy member Gabriele Minì from Hitech. Hitech replaced Minì with Formula 2 race winner Isack Hadjar.
- Campos Racing kept Pepe Martí and replaced Australians Christian Mansell and Hugh Barter with Sebastián Montoya from Hitech and Oliver Goethe from Trident. Mansell moved to ART Grand Prix, joining Nikola Tsolov and FRECA graduate Laurens van Hoepen.
- Sophia Flörsch entered her third Macau Grand Prix with her 2018 team Van Amersfoort Racing, joined by season regular Tommy Smith and reigning Euroformula Open champion Noel León.
- Carlin entered the event with two-time Macau Grand Prix winner Dan Ticktum and Formula 2 driver Zane Maloney.
- MP Motorsport was to retain their regular season drivers Franco Colapinto and Mari Boya, alongside 2023 IndyCar Rookie of the Year Marcus Armstrong. However, in the week leading up to the event, the team announced their F2 driver Dennis Hauger would race in place of Colapinto, with the Argentinian recovering from an injury.

== Practice and qualifying ==
Two 40-minute practice sessions were held across the weekend: the first on Thursday morning, ahead of the first qualifying session, and the second a day later, ahead of the second qualifying session. Qualifying itself was also divided into two 40-minute sessions on Thursday and Friday, with the fastest time set by each driver from either session counting towards their final starting position for the qualification race.

The first practice session was held in clear and dry conditions. Prema Racing's Gabriele Minì was fastest with a time of 2:06.871s, four tenths ahead of Hitech's Luke Browning and Trident's 2019 winner Richard Verschoor. The MP Motorsport pair of Mari Boya and Dennis Hauger completed the top five, with ART's Nikola Tsolov, Carlin's two-time winner Dan Ticktum and the Hitechs of Isack Hadjar and Alex Dunne slotting into the top ten behind. The session was disrupted only once when ART's Laurens van Hoepen crashed at Lisboa at the 26-minute mark and brought out the red flags. Dunne also crashed at the same corner, but was able to get going again on his own, avoiding a stoppage.

The first qualifying session was held on Thursday afternoon, in clear and dry conditions. After all but five cars had set laps, Jenzer's Charlie Wurz was fastest ahead of the MP pair of Marcus Armstrong and Boya, albeit with times almost 20 seconds slower than the practice pace. Prema and VAR had waited longer to leave the pits in hope of a clear track, but were unable to set laps before Campos's Sebastián Montoya crashed at Lisboa to bring out the red flags. Shortly after the resumption, Browning went into first place with a time of 2:07.668s as the first competitive lap times were put on the board. Minì was next to claim first place, 0.069s ahead of Browning, before another stoppage occurred. Trident's Ugo Ugochukwu had gone into the runoff at Lisboa, and took several minutes before he was able to reverse out and continue driving. A flurry of fast laps after the restart saw the order change, but after most of the field had got one lap in, Minì was back on top, leading Hauger and Armstrong. Browning had waited out this round of laps and was just about to start his next flying lap when the session was interrupted again. Carlin's Zane Maloney had hit the barriers and stopped his stricken car at turn 16. After 17 minutes of barrier repairs, the session was restarted with just under ten minutes left. Browning was able to get two laps in this time to claim provisional pole position with his 2:06.018s second lap. The Prema cars once again waited longer in the pits, but when they ultimately came out, Minì retook first place with a time of 2:05.521s as his teammate Dino Beganovic slotted into third. Hauger was fourth, ahead of Dunne and Hadjar. Armstrong was seventh, while both Tsolov and Campos's Oliver Goethe left it late to put in their last attempts, demoting Ticktum to tenth.

The second practice session was held in clear, dry and slightly colder conditions than the day before. Prema was on top once again, albeit this time with Paul Aron clocking in a 2:06.327s lap. Browning continued his run of second places, this time only 0.029s behind. Boya, Dunne and Beganovic completed the top five, with Trident's Roman Staněk, Hadjar, Goethe, Campos's Pepe Martí and Wurz slotting in behind. This second session was disrupted more often than the first: Aron stopped at the Melco hairpin, causing a traffic jam and a red flag. Both Browning and VAR's Tommy Smith ran into the Lisboa run-off, causing two VSC periods, before Tsolov crashed at Faraway Hill. Thursday frontrunner Minì did not go out after this final interruption, explaining his absence from the top ten.

The second qualifying session was held on Friday afternoon, in clear and dry conditions. Before any drivers could set laps, Tsolov crashed out in turn 17, heavily damaging his car and prompting a lengthy red flag. On the restart, Jenzer's Max Esterson entered the fast lane into the path of Martì, with the latter breaking his front wing and having to pit again right after. Boya was the first to lay down a lap of 2:07.530s, before he was beaten by multiple drivers, with Browning slotting into first place with a 2:06.827s lap. Traffic ruined multiple drivers' attempts, but Armstrong and Hauger were not among those and surpassed Browning's time. By now, Armstrong's time would have put him into second on the grid, with only Minì's time from the previous day faster. The whole field now pitted for new tyres, but once again no one would be able to set a time as Hadjar spun around on the formation lap. When Montoya then also stopped at the Melco hairpin, red flags were brought out again. Browning was among the first drivers to set a lap on the restart, slotting into first place and also surpassing Minì's time from Thursday with a 2:05.435s lap. Minì responded to close the gap to 0.006s, but shortly afterwards, Ugochukwu crashed and caused another interruption. The session was restarted with five minutes to go, setting up a final one-lap shootout, but that did not happen as Hadjar crashed and the session was ended early without anyone else setting a lap. Browning thereby claimed pole position by the closest margin in Macau Grand Prix history.

=== Qualifying classification ===
Each of the driver's fastest lap times from the two qualifying sessions are denoted in bold.

Final qualifying classification
Pos	No.	Driver	Team	Q1 Time	Rank	Q2 Time	Rank	Gap	Grid
1	11	(United Kingdom) Luke Browning	Hitech Pulse-Eight	2:06.018	2	**2:05.435**	1	—	1
2	9	(Italy) Gabriele Minì	SJM Theodore Prema Racing	2:05.521	1	**2:05.441**	2	+0.006	2
3	8	(Sweden) Dino Beganovic	SJM Theodore Prema Racing	2:06.131	3	**2:05.518**	3	+0.083	3
4	12	(France) Isack Hadjar	Hitech Pulse-Eight	2:06.364	6	**2:05.557**	4	+0.122	4
5	29	(New Zealand) Marcus Armstrong	MP Motorsport	2:06.714	7	**2:05.732**	5	+0.297	5
6	14	(Republic of Ireland) Alex Dunne	Hitech Pulse-Eight	2:06.158	5	**2:05.755**	6	+0.320	6
7	17	(Germany) Oliver Goethe	Campos Racing	2:06.834	9	**2:06.092**	7	+0.657	7
8	27	(Norway) Dennis Hauger	MP Motorsport	**2:06.135**	4	2:06.643	14	+0.700	8
9	3	(United States) Ugo Ugochukwu	Trident Motorsport	2:08.280	19	**2:06.167**	8	+0.732	9
10	28	(Spain) Mari Boya	MP Motorsport	2:07.946	17	**2:06.192**	9	+0.757	10
11	15	(Spain) Pepe Martí	Campos Racing	2:08.034	18	**2:06.264**	10	+0.811	11
12	1	(Netherlands) Richard Verschoor	Trident Motorsport	2:07.064	11	**2:06.323**	11	+0.888	12
13	25	(United Kingdom) Dan Ticktum	Rodin Carlin	2:06.985	10	**2:06.460**	12	+1.025	13
14	10	(Estonia) Paul Aron	SJM Theodore Prema Racing	2:07.108	12	**2:06.475**	13	+1.040	14
15	23	(Bulgaria) Nikola Tsolov	ART Grand Prix	**2:06.755**	8	—	26	+1.320	15
16	24	(Barbados) Zane Maloney	Rodin Carlin	2:07.834	16	**2:06.789**	15	+1.363	16
17	19	(Germany) Sophia Flörsch	Van Amersfoort Racing	2:08.966	24	**2:06.912**	16	+1.477	17
18	6	(Austria) Charlie Wurz	Jenzer Motorsport	2:07.353	13	**2:07.219**	17	+1.784	18
19	18	(Mexico) Noel León	Van Amersfoort Racing	**2:07.368**	14	2:07.504	19	+1.933	19
20	2	(Czech Republic) Roman Staněk	Trident Motorsport	2:07.570	15	**2:07.433**	18	+1.998	20
21	5	(United States) Max Esterson	Jenzer Motorsport	2:08.429	21	**2:07.507**	20	+2.072	21
22	21	(Netherlands) Laurens van Hoepen	ART Grand Prix	2:08.651	22	**2:07.540**	21	+2.105	22
23	16	(Colombia) Sebastián Montoya	Campos Racing	2:44.434	26	**2:07.656**	22	+2.221	23
24	22	(Australia) Christian Mansell	ART Grand Prix	2:08.329	20	**2:08.049**	23	+2.614	24
25	7	(Peru) Matías Zagazeta	Jenzer Motorsport	2:08.769	23	**2:08.489**	24	+3.054	25
26	20	(Australia) Tommy Smith	Van Amersfoort Racing	**2:09.071**	25	2:10.226	25	+3.636	26
**Bold time** indicates the faster of the two times that determined grid order.

== Qualifying race ==
2023 Macau Grand Prix
- Qualifying Race

Race details
- Date: 18 November 2023
- Distance: 10 laps, 61.20 km (38.03 mi)
- Weather: Dry and clear

Pole position
Driver	(United Kingdom) Luke Browning	Hitech Pulse-Eight
- Time: 2:05.435

Fastest lap
Driver	(United Kingdom) Luke Browning	Hitech Pulse-Eight
- Time: 2:06.257 on lap 8

Podium
First	(United Kingdom) Luke Browning	Hitech Pulse-Eight
Second	(Republic of Ireland) Alex Dunne	Hitech Pulse-Eight
Third	(Italy) Gabriele Minì	SJM Theodore Prema Racing

The 10-lap qualifying race to set the main race's starting order commenced at 16.15 Macau Standard Time (UTC+08:00) on 18 November, after a slight 25-minute delay for barrier repairs following a crash in the preceding event. Conditions at the start were dry and clear, with the air temperature at 22 °C (71 °F). Browning led Minì at the start, before the Italian used his slipstream to draw alongside approaching Mandarin. The pair rounded the bend with Minì on the outside looking set to get ahead of Browning, before the Brit got his car back in front and braked later into Lisboa to hold the lead. Browning then pulled away by over a second through the rest of the lap, while most of the midfield was disrupted by Armstrong and Jenzer's Matías Zagazeta colliding at the Melco hairpin. Both cars got going again, but the green running was short-lived, as Ugochukwu cut the corner into Lisboa on lap two and hit Ticktum's car to send both into the wall. A full course caution was called that turned into a safety car. Armstrong used the interruption to pit for repairs without losing a lap.

Racing resumed on lap five of ten. Browning restarted the race going into R corner, but slid slightly on his cold tyres to come under pressure by Minì. He weaved to break the tow as Mini got on his outside again, before Dunne got into his inside to make it three cars wide. Once again, Browning had the best braking phase into Lisboa to take the lead, with Dunne slotting into second. Browning then went onto a run of fastest laps to consolidate his lead, while the top four pulled away from Hauger in fifth, all of them with significant gaps building between each other. Hadjar dropped down behind Aron, Boya and Martì in this phase, before Boya overtook Aron for sixth on the final lap. Maloney completed the top ten, in front of Wurz, who held off reigning winner Verschoor's attacks throughout the final laps. Tsolov, van Hoepen and VAR's Sophia Flörsch made up the rest of the top fifteen drivers, ahead of Esterson, VAR's Noel León, Montoya, Staněk and ART's Christian Mansell. Goethe struggled throughout the race and finished 21st, while Armstrong recovered from his stoppage to come 22nd. Smith and Zagazeta were the last classified finishers.

=== Qualifying race classification ===
Final qualification race classification
Pos	No.	Driver	Team	Laps	Time/Retired	Grid
1	11	(United Kingdom) Luke Browning	Hitech Pulse-Eight	10	26:52.318	1
2	14	(Republic of Ireland) Alex Dunne	Hitech Pulse-Eight	10	+2.097	6
3	9	(Italy) Gabriele Minì	SJM Theodore Prema Racing	10	+4.441	2
4	8	(Sweden) Dino Beganovic	SJM Theodore Prema Racing	10	+5.339	3
5	27	(Norway) Dennis Hauger	MP Motorsport	10	+10.936	8
6	28	(Spain) Mari Boya	MP Motorsport	10	+13.082	10
7	10	(Estonia) Paul Aron	SJM Theodore Prema Racing	10	+13.877	14
8	15	(Spain) Pepe Martí	Campos Racing	10	+17.224	11
9	12	(France) Isack Hadjar	Hitech Pulse-Eight	10	+17.648	4
10	24	(Barbados) Zane Maloney	Rodin Carlin	10	+19.620	16
11	6	(Austria) Charlie Wurz	Jenzer Motorsport	10	+20.946	18
12	1	(Netherlands) Richard Verschoor	Trident Motorsport	10	+21.490	12
13	23	(Bulgaria) Nikola Tsolov	ART Grand Prix	10	+22.390	15
14	21	(Netherlands) Laurens van Hoepen	ART Grand Prix	10	+24.804	22
15	19	(Germany) Sophia Flörsch	Van Amersfoort Racing	10	+25.505	17
16	5	(United States) Max Esterson	Jenzer Motorsport	10	+26.184	21
17	18	(Mexico) Noel León	Van Amersfoort Racing	10	+26.610	19
18	16	(Colombia) Sebastián Montoya	Campos Racing	10	+27.535	23
19	2	(Czech Republic) Roman Staněk	Trident Motorsport	10	+28.329	20
20	22	(Australia) Christian Mansell	ART Grand Prix	10	+28.896	24
21	17	(Germany) Oliver Goethe	Campos Racing	10	+29.894	7
22	29	(New Zealand) Marcus Armstrong	MP Motorsport	10	+30.515	5
23	20	(Australia) Tommy Smith	Van Amersfoort Racing	10	+34.908	26
24	7	(Peru) Matías Zagazeta	Jenzer Motorsport	10	+37.750	25
Ret	25	(United Kingdom) Dan Ticktum	Rodin Carlin	1	Accident	13
Ret	3	(United States) Ugo Ugochukwu	Trident Motorsport	1	Accident	9
Fastest Lap: Luke Browning, 2:06.257, 108.4 mph (174.5 km/h), on lap 8

== Main race ==
The 15-lap race commenced at 15.30 Macau Standard Time (UTC+08:00) on 19 November. Conditions at the start were dry and clear, with the air temperature at 22 °C (71 °F). Montoya stalled his car on the grid, but notified the flag marshals so everyone could avoid him. Browning held the lead at the start, while Minì overtook Dunne straight away for second. Dunne attempted to reclaim the position, but ran too wide and hit the outer wall of Lisboa. A quick VSC to retrieve his car ended before lap two began. On lap three, Beganovic was the next driver to try and overhaul Minì, but also crashed into Lisboa in a carbon copy of Dunne's move. Another VSC was the result, but it was withdrawn similarly quick. Montoya rejoined the race five laps down, while Hauger was putting pressure on Aron before finally making the move for third.

The order at the top stabilized following that, before the race was disrupted on lap eight. Aron suffered a mechanical issue that resulted in him heavily hitting the wall in the Esses. His car snapped in half and slid down the track, while Martì and Wurz both suffered damage when trying to avoid the accident. Aron's chassis came to a halt in turn 14 and burst into flames. He was able to climb out, while the safety car was called. However, it quickly became apparent that extensive repair and cleanup would be needed, and so red flags were waved. This allowed the damaged cars to be repaired, but Wurz's damage was terminal. Armstrong, who had run off into Lisboa at the same time as Aron's accident, was also able to unlap himself.

After a stoppage of over an hour, the race was restarted with two laps behind the safety car setting up a four-lap shootout. Hauger had a strong restart, passing Minì for second through Mandarin. He challenged Browning for the lead into Lisboa, but the Brit covered the inside line to keep first place. He was denied another attempt at the lead when Tsolov crashed into the wall at Fisherman's Bend on lap 13, with the remaining two laps carried out under safety car conditions.

Browning was thereby able to claim the win without any further challenge, a deserved victory after having already blitzed qualifying and managing restart after restart into Lisboa in both races to perfection. Speaking to the media, he called his win "the biggest achievement of [his] career to date" and called himself humbled to put his name on the list of Macau Grand Prix winners. Second-placed man Hauger was amazed to have finished that high after only being called up to race nine days before the event. After initially looking like a favourite to win the race, Minì could only manage third place, and was understandably disappointed. He told the media he was "a bit disappointed with P3, but it’s still [...] a good achievement". The Spanish pair of Boya and Martì completed the top five, with Verschoor, Hadjar and Maloney slotting in behind. Goethe and van Hoepen both had remarkable climbs up the order to bring up the rear of the top ten. Flörsch, Staněk, Ticktum and Smith came home next, followed by Ugochukwu, Mansell and Zagazeta. Armstrong, León and Esterson were the final classified finishers, with Montoya also still running when the chequered flag was waved.

=== Race classification ===
Final race classification
Pos	No.	Driver	Team	Laps	Time/Retired	Grid
1	11	(United Kingdom) Luke Browning	Hitech Pulse-Eight	15	1:35:08.337	1
2	27	(Norway) Dennis Hauger	MP Motorsport	15	+0.347	5
3	9	(Italy) Gabriele Minì	SJM Theodore Prema Racing	15	+0.699	3
4	28	(Spain) Mari Boya	MP Motorsport	15	+1.038	6
5	15	(Spain) Pepe Martí	Campos Racing	15	+1.309	8
6	1	(Netherlands) Richard Verschoor	Trident Motorsport	15	+1.759	12
7	12	(France) Isack Hadjar	Hitech Pulse-Eight	15	+2.349	9
8	24	(Barbados) Zane Maloney	Rodin Carlin	15	+2.538	10
9	17	(Germany) Oliver Goethe	Campos Racing	15	+2.820	21
10	21	(Netherlands) Laurens van Hoepen	ART Grand Prix	15	+3.008	14
11	19	(Germany) Sophia Flörsch	Van Amersfoort Racing	15	+3.398	15
12	2	(Czech Republic) Roman Staněk	Trident Motorsport	15	+3.969	19
13	25	(United Kingdom) Dan Ticktum	Rodin Carlin	15	+4.731	25
14	20	(Australia) Tommy Smith	Van Amersfoort Racing	15	+5.012	23
15	3	(United States) Ugo Ugochukwu	Trident Motorsport	15	+5.130	26
16	22	(Australia) Christian Mansell	ART Grand Prix	15	+5.479	20
17	7	(Peru) Matías Zagazeta	Jenzer Motorsport	15	+5.731	24
18	29	(New Zealand) Marcus Armstrong	MP Motorsport	15	+6.861	22
19	18	(Mexico) Noel León	Van Amersfoort Racing	15	+7.640	17
20	5	(United States) Max Esterson	Jenzer Motorsport	15	+13.221	16
Ret	23	(Bulgaria) Nikola Tsolov	ART Grand Prix	11	Accident	13
NC†	16	(Colombia) Sebastián Montoya	Campos Racing	10	+ 5 laps	18
Ret	6	(Austria) Charlie Wurz	Jenzer Motorsport	9	Accident damage	11
Ret	10	(Estonia) Paul Aron	SJM Theodore Prema Racing	7	Accident	7
Ret	8	(Sweden) Dino Beganovic	SJM Theodore Prema Racing	2	Accident	4
Ret	14	(Republic of Ireland) Alex Dunne	Hitech Pulse-Eight	0	Accident	2
Fastest Lap: Luke Browning, 2:06.647, 108.1 mph (173.9 km/h), on lap 7

== See also ==
- 2023 FIA GT World Cup
- 2023 Macau Guia Race
- 2023 Macau Formula 4 Race
