= 2017–18 NACAM Formula 4 Championship =

Motor racing competition

Seasons
- ← 2016–17 2018–19 →

The 2017–18 NACAM Formula 4 Championship season was the third season of the NACAM Formula 4 Championship. It began on 2 September 2017 at the Autódromo Hermanos Rodríguez in Mexico City and ended on 30 June 2018 at the same venue after eight rounds.

== Teams and drivers ==
Team	No.	Driver	Rounds
(Mexico) MomoF4 Team	5	(Mexico) Alexandra Mohnhaupt	1–5
(Mexico) MomoF4 Team	7	(Mexico) Gustavo Jiménez Pons	2
(Mexico) MomoF4 Team	8	(Mexico) Íñigo León	2–5
(Mexico) MomoF4 Team	88	(Colombia) Juan José Díaz	1
(Mexico) Scuderia Martiga EG	5	(United States) Kory Enders	8
(Mexico) Scuderia Martiga EG	6	(Mexico) Moisés de la Vara	All
(Mexico) Scuderia Martiga EG	7	(Brazil) Francisco Porto	7–8
(Mexico) Scuderia Martiga EG	11	(United States) Kory Enders	7
(Mexico) Scuderia Martiga EG	18	(Mexico) Chara Mansur	7
(Mexico) Scuderia Martiga EG	66	(Brazil) Sergio da Silveira	2
(Mexico) Scuderia Martiga EG	66	(Mexico) Gerardo Martínez	3
(Mexico) Scuderia Martiga EG	97	(Barbados) Christian Hinds	2
(Brazil) Prop Car Racing	8	(Mexico) Íñigo León	6–8
(Brazil) Prop Car Racing	24	(Mexico) Mariano del Castillo	4
(Brazil) Prop Car Racing	24	(Mexico) Regina Sirvent	5
(Brazil) Prop Car Racing	38	(Mexico) José Manuel Vilalta	2–3
(Brazil) Prop Car Racing	46	(Mexico) José Sierra	1
(Brazil) Prop Car Racing	54	(Brazil) Igor Fraga	1–2, 4–8
(Brazil) Prop Car Racing	57	(Mexico) Giancarlo Vecchi	3
(Mexico) Easy-Shop.com Racing	9	(Mexico) Daniel Forcadell	2–4, 8
(Mexico) Herrera Racing	10	(Mexico) Jorge Herrera	1, 8
(Mexico) Telcel RPL Racing	11	(Mexico) Mariano Martínez	1–2, 4–5, 8
(Mexico) Telcel RPL Racing	11	(Mexico) Rod McLeod	3
(Mexico) Telcel RPL Racing	12	(Mexico) Pablo Perez de Lara	8
(Mexico) Telcel RPL Racing	20	(Mexico) Emiliano Richards	8
(Mexico) Telcel RPL Racing	79	(Colombia) Santiago Lozano	1–3
(Mexico) Telcel RPL Racing	99	(Mexico) Manuel Cabrera	2
(Mexico) Ram Racing	17	(Dominican Republic) Michael Santos	1–6, 8
(Mexico) Ram Racing	17	(Mexico) Noel León	7
(Mexico) Ram Racing	28	(Mexico) Emiliano Jáuregui	All
(Mexico) Marespi Racing Team	22	(Mexico) Sergio Martínez	2
(Panama) JLBernal Racing	57	(Mexico) Mariano del Castillo	1
(Panama) JLBernal Racing	70	(Puerto Rico) Gabriel Bacó	8
(Mexico) APYCSA Racing	97	(Mexico) Álex Servín	4

== Race calendar and results ==
A provisional calendar was made public on the days leading to the first round on 3 September 2017. As opposed to the previous year, all rounds were held in Mexico. The first two rounds were held in support of the 2017 6 Hours of Mexico and the 2017 Mexican Grand Prix, respectively. An updated version of the calendar was released in November 2017, which was in turn amended in February 2018.

Round		Circuit	Date	Pole position	Fastest lap	Winning driver	Winning team
2017
1	R1	Autódromo Hermanos Rodríguez (Mexico City)	2 September	(Mexico) Moisés de la Vara	(Mexico) Moisés de la Vara	(Brazil) Igor Fraga	(Brazil) Prop Car Racing
1	R2	Autódromo Hermanos Rodríguez (Mexico City)	3 September		(Mexico) Moisés de la Vara	(Mexico) Moisés de la Vara	(Mexico) Scuderia Martiga EG
2	R1	Autódromo Hermanos Rodríguez (Mexico City)	28 October	(Brazil) Igor Fraga	(Brazil) Igor Fraga	(Brazil) Igor Fraga	(Brazil) Prop Car Racing
2	R2	Autódromo Hermanos Rodríguez (Mexico City)	29 October		(Mexico) Moisés de la Vara	(Mexico) Moisés de la Vara	(Mexico) Scuderia Martiga EG
3	R1	Circuito Centro Dinámico Pegaso (Toluca, Estado de México)	25 November	(Mexico) Moisés de la Vara	(Mexico) Moisés de la Vara	(Mexico) Moisés de la Vara	(Mexico) Scuderia Martiga EG
3	R2	Circuito Centro Dinámico Pegaso (Toluca, Estado de México)	26 November		(Mexico) Giancarlo Vecchi	(Colombia) Santiago Lozano	(Mexico) Telcel RPL Racing
3	R3	Circuito Centro Dinámico Pegaso (Toluca, Estado de México)	26 November	(Mexico) Moisés de la Vara	(Mexico) Moisés de la Vara	(Mexico) Moisés de la Vara	(Mexico) Scuderia Martiga EG
2018
4	R1	Autódromo Miguel E. Abed (Amozoc, Puebla)	17 February	(Mexico) Moisés de la Vara	(Brazil) Igor Fraga	(Mexico) Alexandra Mohnhaupt	(Mexico) MomoF4 Team
4	R2	Autódromo Miguel E. Abed (Amozoc, Puebla)	18 February		(Brazil) Igor Fraga	(Mexico) Alexandra Mohnhaupt	(Mexico) MomoF4 Team
4	R3	Autódromo Miguel E. Abed (Amozoc, Puebla)	18 February	(Mexico) Moisés de la Vara	(Brazil) Igor Fraga	(Brazil) Igor Fraga	(Brazil) Prop Car Racing
5	R1	Autódromo Internacional de Aguascalientes (Aguascalientes, Aguascalientes)	17 March	(Brazil) Igor Fraga	(Brazil) Igor Fraga	(Brazil) Igor Fraga	(Brazil) Prop Car Racing
5	R2	Autódromo Internacional de Aguascalientes (Aguascalientes, Aguascalientes)	18 March		(Brazil) Igor Fraga	(Brazil) Igor Fraga	(Brazil) Prop Car Racing
5	R3	Autódromo Internacional de Aguascalientes (Aguascalientes, Aguascalientes)	18 March	(Brazil) Igor Fraga	(Brazil) Igor Fraga	(Mexico) Moisés de la Vara	(Mexico) Scuderia Martiga EG
6	R1	Autódromo Emerson Fittipaldi (Mérida, Yucatán)	14 April	(Brazil) Igor Fraga	(Mexico) Moisés de la Vara	(Brazil) Igor Fraga	(Brazil) Prop Car Racing
6	R2	Autódromo Emerson Fittipaldi (Mérida, Yucatán)	15 April		(Brazil) Igor Fraga	(Mexico) Moisés de la Vara	(Mexico) Scuderia Martiga EG
6	R3	Autódromo Emerson Fittipaldi (Mérida, Yucatán)	15 April	(Brazil) Igor Fraga	(Dominican Republic) Michael Santos	(Brazil) Igor Fraga	(Brazil) Prop Car Racing
7	R1	Autódromo de Monterrey (Apodaca, Nuevo León)	5 May	(Mexico) Moisés de la Vara	(Brazil) Francisco Porto	(Mexico) Moisés de la Vara	(Mexico) Scuderia Martiga EG
7	R2	Autódromo de Monterrey (Apodaca, Nuevo León)	6 May		(Mexico) Moisés de la Vara	(Mexico) Moisés de la Vara	(Mexico) Scuderia Martiga EG
7	R3	Autódromo de Monterrey (Apodaca, Nuevo León)	6 May	(Mexico) Moisés de la Vara	(Mexico) Moisés de la Vara	(Mexico) Moisés de la Vara	(Mexico) Scuderia Martiga EG
8	R1	Autódromo Hermanos Rodríguez (Mexico City)	29 June	(United States) Kory Enders	(United States) Kory Enders	(United States) Kory Enders	(Mexico) Scuderia Martiga EG
8	R2	Autódromo Hermanos Rodríguez (Mexico City)	30 June		(United States) Kory Enders	(United States) Kory Enders	(Mexico) Scuderia Martiga EG
8	R3	Autódromo Hermanos Rodríguez (Mexico City)	30 June	(United States) Kory Enders	(Brazil) Francisco Porto	(United States) Kory Enders	(Mexico) Scuderia Martiga EG

== Championship standings ==
Points were awarded to the top 10 classified finishers in each race.

Position	**1st**	**2nd**	**3rd**	**4th**	**5th**	**6th**	**7th**	**8th**	**9th**	**10th**
Points	25	18	15	12	10	8	6	4	2	1

=== Drivers' Championship ===
Pos	Driver	AHR1		AHR2		EDM			PUE			AGS			MER			MTY			AHR3			Pts
Pos	Driver	R1	R2	R1	R2	R1	R2	R3	R1	R2	R3	R1	R2	R3	R1	R2	R3	R1	R2	R3	R1	R2	R3	Pts
1	(Mexico) Moisés de la Vara	**2**	1	5	1	**1**	2	**1**	**3**	Ret	**2**	7	2	1	3	1	3	**1**	1	**1**	4	8	4	386
2	(Brazil) Igor Fraga	1	3	**1**	6				2	8	1	**1**	1	**Ret**	**1**	2	**1**	DNS	4	3	Ret	Ret	3	280
3	(Dominican Republic) Michael Santos	7	7	7	5	5	7	3	7	7	4	2	3	2	2	5	2				3	4	8	211
4	(Mexico) Iñigo León			9	Ret	8	8	6	5	2	3	6	4	3	5	4	4	4	7	5	2	9	7	184
5	(Mexico) Alexandra Mohnhaupt	3	2	2	Ret	2	3	8	1	1	6	3	5	4										183
6	(Mexico) Emiliano Jáuregui	8	Ret	10	8	7	5	5	4	3	7	Ret	6	5	4	3	Ret	5	6	6	11	12	10	140
7	(United States) Kory Enders																	2	3	2	**1**	1	**1**	126
8	(Colombia) Santiago Lozano	4	4	3	10	3	1	2																98
9	(Brazil) Francisco Porto																	Ret	5	8	Ret	2	2	50
10	(Mexico) Daniel Forcadell			Ret	7	6	Ret	Ret	6	4	Ret										6	6	12	50
11	(Mexico) Jorge Herrera	5	5																		7	3	6	49
12	(Mexico) Noel León																	3	2	4				45
13	(Mexico) Mariano Martínez	10	8	11	9				Ret	6	8	4	8	6							10	11	13	44
14	(Mexico) José Manuel Vilalta			6	3	9	6	7																39
15	(Mexico) Giancarlo Vecchi					4	4	4																36
16	(Brazil) Sergio da Silveira			4	2																			30
17	(Mexico) Mariano del Castillo	9	9						8	5	5													28
18	(Puerto Rico) Gabriel Bacó																				5	5	9	22
19	(Mexico) Regina Sirvent											5	7	7										22
20	(Mexico) Chara Mansur																	6	8	7				18
21	(Mexico) Manuel Cabrera			8	4																			16
22	(Colombia) Juan José Díaz	6	6																					16
23	(Mexico) Emiliano Richards																				9	10	5	13
24	(Mexico) Pablo Perez de Lara																				8	7	11	10
25	(Mexico) José Sierra	DNS	10																					1
26	(Barbados) Christian Hinds			Ret	11																			0
27	(Mexico) Sergio Martínez			12	EX																			0
28	(Mexico) Gustavo Jiménez Pons			13	Ret																			0
29	(Mexico) Alex Servín								Ret	Ret	Ret				DNS	Ret	Ret							0
Drivers ineligible for championship points
	(Mexico) Gerardo Martínez					DNP	Ret	Ret																
	(Mexico) Rod McLeod					DNP		Ret																
Pos	Driver	R1	R2	R1	R2	R1	R2	R3	R1	R2	R3	R1	R2	R3	R1	R2	R3	R1	R2	R3	R1	R2	R3	Pts
Pos	Driver	AHR1		AHR2		EDM			PUE			AGS			PAC			SLP			AHR3			Pts

Colour	Result
Gold	Winner
Silver	Second place
Bronze	Third place
Green	Points classification
Blue	Non-points classification
Blue	Non-classified finish (NC)
Purple	Retired, not classified (Ret)
Red	Did not qualify (DNQ)
Red	Did not pre-qualify (DNPQ)
Black	Disqualified (DSQ)
White	Did not start (DNS)
White	Withdrew (WD)
White	Race cancelled (C)
Blank	Did not practice (DNP)
Blank	Did not arrive (DNA)
Blank	Excluded (EX)

**Bold** – Pole
Italics – Fastest Lap

== See also ==
- Panam GP Series
- LATAM Challenge Series
