= Noel León =

Mexican racing driver (born 2004)

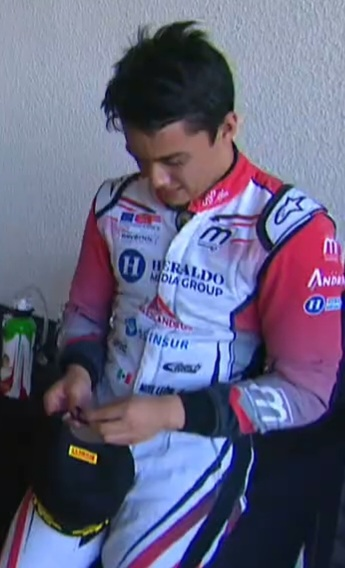
- León in 2023
- Nationality: (Mexico) Mexican
- Born: Noel Jesús León Vázquez; 21 December 2004 (age 21) Monterrey, Nuevo León, Mexico

FIA Formula 2 Championship career
- Debut season: 2026
- Current team: Campos Racing
- Car number: 5
- Starts: 18
- Wins: 3
- Podiums: 4
- Poles: 1
- Fastest laps: 2
- Best finish: TBD in 2026

Previous series
- 2023; 2022; 2021; 2021; 2018–2020: Euroformula Open; FR European; F4 United States; NASCAR Challenge Series Mx.; NACAM F4

Championship titles
- 2023 2021 2021 2019–20: Euroformula Open; F4 United States; NASCAR Challenge Series Mx. NACAM Formula 4
- Statistics up to date as of 25 August 2026.

Noel Jesús León Vázquez (born 21 December 2004) is a Mexican racing driver who drives for Campos Racing in the FIA Formula 2 Championship.

León is the 2019–20 NACAM F4, 2021 F4 US and the 2023 Euroformula Open champion. With his success, he stepped up to FIA Formula 3 for 2024 and 2025, finishing tenth in the former with Van Amersfoort Racing.

== Career ==
=== Formula 4 (2018–2021) ===
==== 2018 ====
León's first appearance in single-seaters was at the penultimate round of the 2017-18 NACAM F4 season, deputising for Michael Santos at Ram Racing. It was a strong debut, as he finished on the podium in races one and two.

León returned for the opening round of the 2018-19 NACAM F4 season, which supported the 2018 Mexican Grand Prix. He once again finished on the podium in race one, and was fourth in race two.

==== 2020 ====
León contested the entire 2019–20 NACAM F4 season with Ram Racing once more, opening the season with a win and another podium during the round that coincided the 2019 Mexican Grand Prix. He maintained his form for the rest of the season, scoring a win in each of the remaining six rounds. Those wins, coupled with eight further podiums, allowed him to clinch the title with one race to spare.

==== 2021 ====
In 2021, León progressed into the F4 United States Championship with DEForce Racing, partnering fellow countryman José Andrés Martínez. Whilst he only scored two wins at Road America and Mid-Ohio across the year, the Mexican managed to move his way to the lead of the standings with a string of consistent podium finishes, culminating in a double podium at the Circuit of the Americas in a round supporting the 2021 United States Grand Prix, where León clinched the championship.

=== Formula Regional (2022) ===
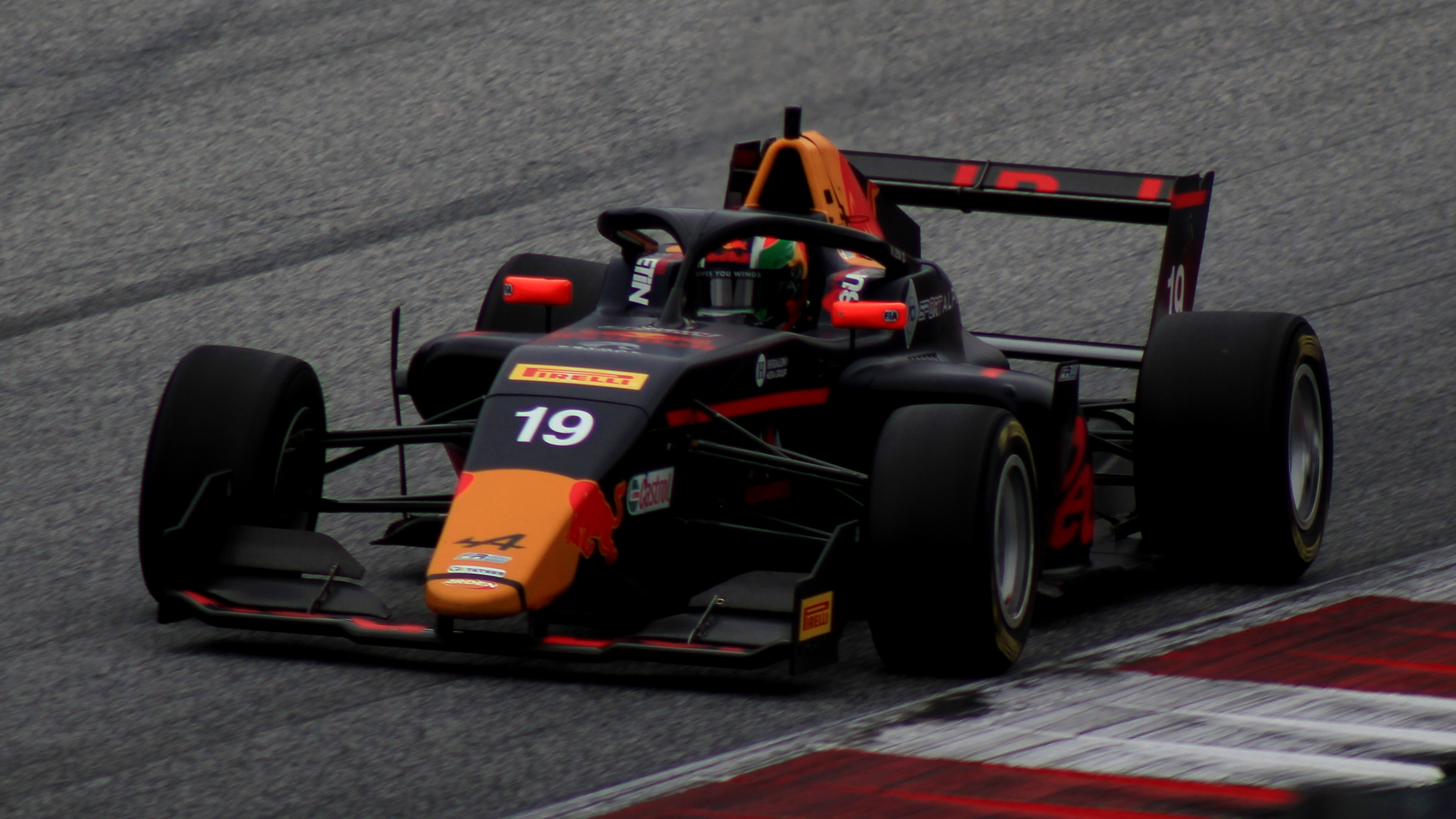
León racing in the 2022 Formula Regional European Championship at the Red Bull Ring.

León made his first step into European single-seaters in 2022, racing in the Formula Regional European Championship with Arden Motorsport. He wouldn't score points at the opening two rounds in Monza and Imola, however this would change in Monaco, where he managed to obtain tenth place in the first race and ninth place in the second, scoring his first points. However, these were the only points he scored during a difficult season, and he finished 23rd in the standings with three points, behind teammates Eduardo Barrichello and Joshua Dürksen.

=== Euroformula Open (2023) ===
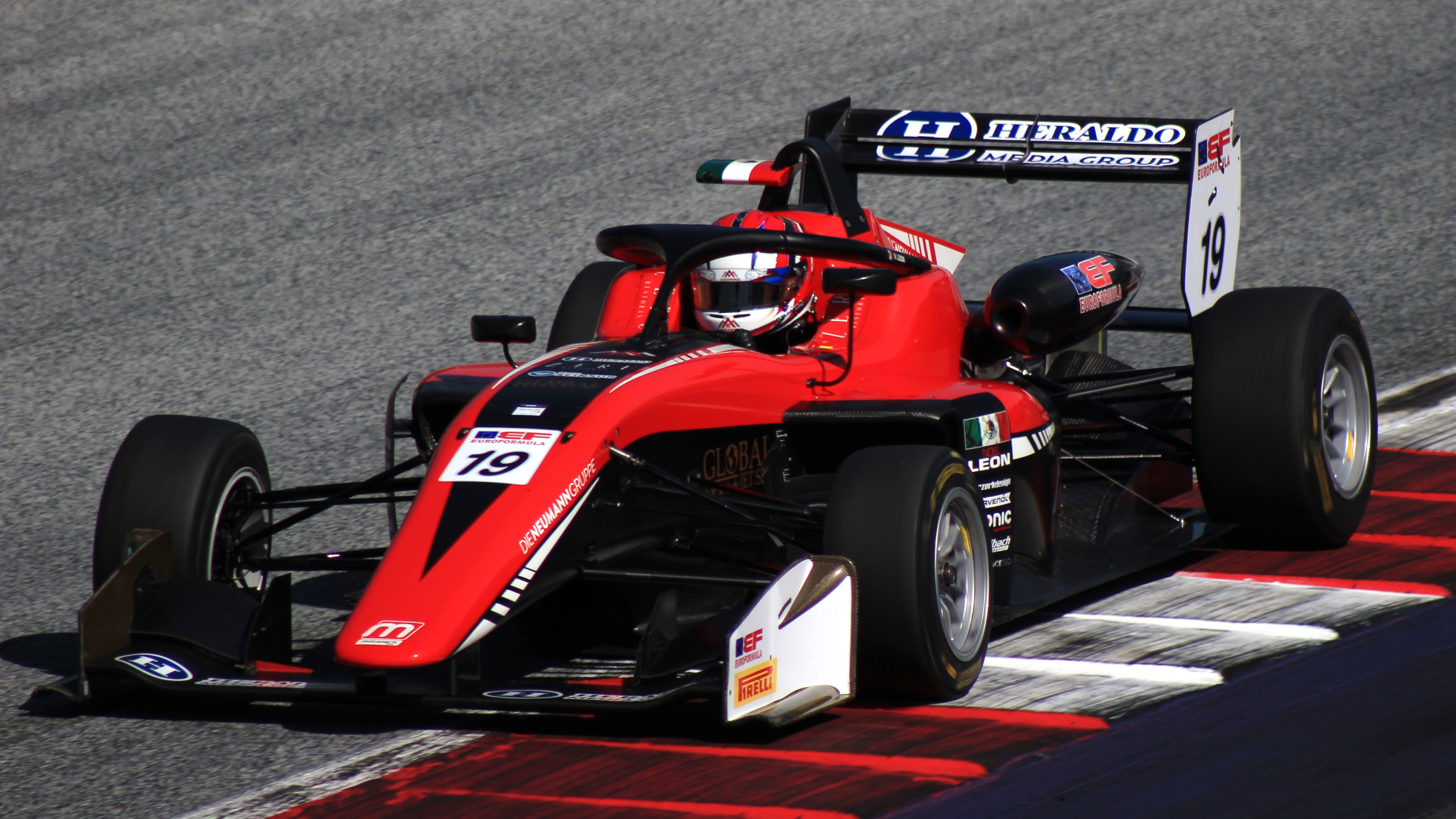
León racing in the 2023 Euroformula Open Championship at the Red Bull Ring.

For the 2023 season, León moved to the Euroformula Open Championship, driving for Team Motopark. He enjoyed a dominant campaign, taking seven victories and a further nine podiums to secure the championship by 87 points. He began the season strongly in Portimão, finishing third on debut before securing his first win in the third race. A podium lockout in Spa-Francorchamps—which included a win—alongside another victory at the Hungaroring cemented him as the championship leader. His first winless weekend came in Paul Ricard, where he was eliminated in a collision with Francesco Simonazzi in the first race. Nevertheless, León responded with a double victory in Austria. Further wins in Monza and Mugello allowed him to clinch the title at the latter round with one round to spare.

=== Formula 3 (2022–2025) ===
==== 2022-23 ====
León took part in the first day of FIA Formula 3 post-season testing in 2022 with Van Amersfoort Racing. In the 2023 post-season testing, he again joined Van Amersfoort Racing.

León's first competitive experience in Formula 3 was at the 2023 Macau Grand Prix, once again joining Van Amersfoort Racing, where he finished 19th.

==== 2024 ====
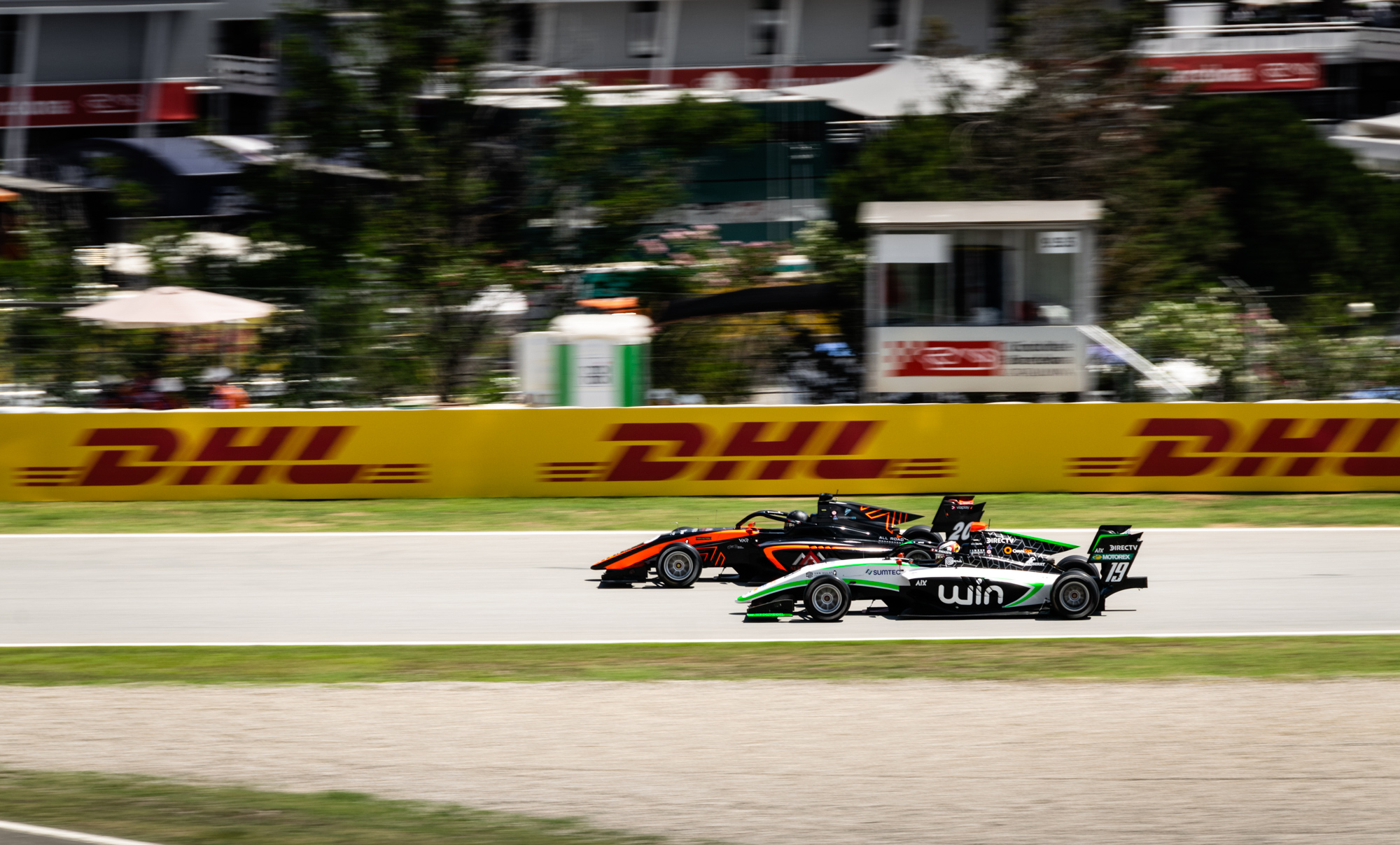
León racing Matías Zagazeta in the 2024 FIA Formula 3 Championship at Circuit de Barcelona-Catalunya.

In December 2023, Van Amersfoort Racing announced that León would be their first signing for the 2024 FIA Formula 3 season. After failing to score in the opening two rounds, León secured his first breakthrough in the Imola sprint race, where he initially won, but was demoted to third following a post-race penalty for weaving behind the safety car. He finished fourth in the Monaco sprint race, though a collision with Nikola Tsolov in the feature race dropped him down the order. Further points followed in Barcelona from thirteenth and Austria, although he missed out on a top-five finish in the latter feature race after contact with Oliver Goethe caused a puncture. He finished runner-up in the Silverstone sprint race, taking his second rostrum of the campaign. He built on this momentum in Budapest, achieving his maiden feature race podium with second place after Laurens van Hoepen was disqualified. León enjoyed one of his strongest weekends in Spa-Francorchamps, earning another sprint race podium with a last-lap overtake on Tim Tramnitz before finishing fourth in the feature race. He concluded the season with seventh place in the Monza feature race. With four podiums and 79 points, León finished tenth in the overall standings, scoring all but twelve of Van Amersfoort's points that season.

Following the season, León returned to the Macau Grand Prix with Pinnacle Motorsport, where he ran in third throughout the race and successfully defended against a late change from Freddie Slater to secure a podium finish.

==== 2025 ====
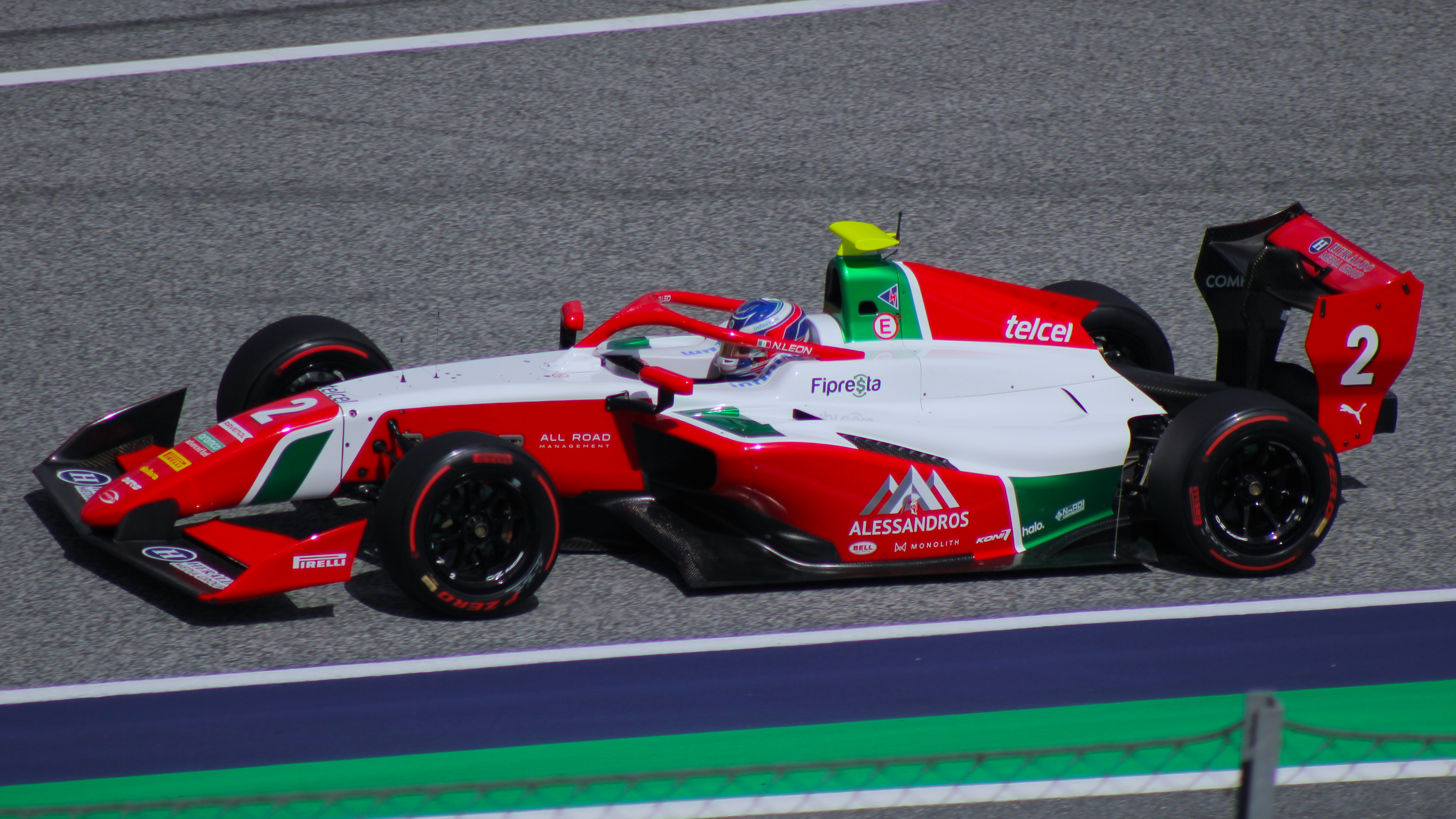
León driving the Dallara F3 2025 during the 2025 Spielberg Formula 3 round

León switched to reigning champions Prema Racing for the 2025 FIA Formula 3 Championship, partnering McLaren juniors Ugo Ugochukwu and Brando Badoer. The team struggled to adapt to new regulations, with León scoring just three points across the opening three rounds. He qualified seventh in Monaco in an attempt to revive his campaign, but endured a difficult weekend, retiring from both races after colliding with Callum Voisin on the opening lap of the sprint and crashing out from sixth in the feature. His challenging patch of form continued over the next two rounds, where he recorded tenth-place finishes in both sprint races. León's breakthrough came at Silverstone; after finishing seventh in the sprint, a strategic gamble to start on wet tyres in the feature race secured him his first podium of the season. In Monza, he qualified in the top three for the first time, and despite a penalty dropping him out of the points in the sprint, he converted his strong grid position into a third-place finish the feature race. León concluded the season seventeenth in the standings with 36 points and two podiums.

=== FIA Formula 2 (2026–) ===
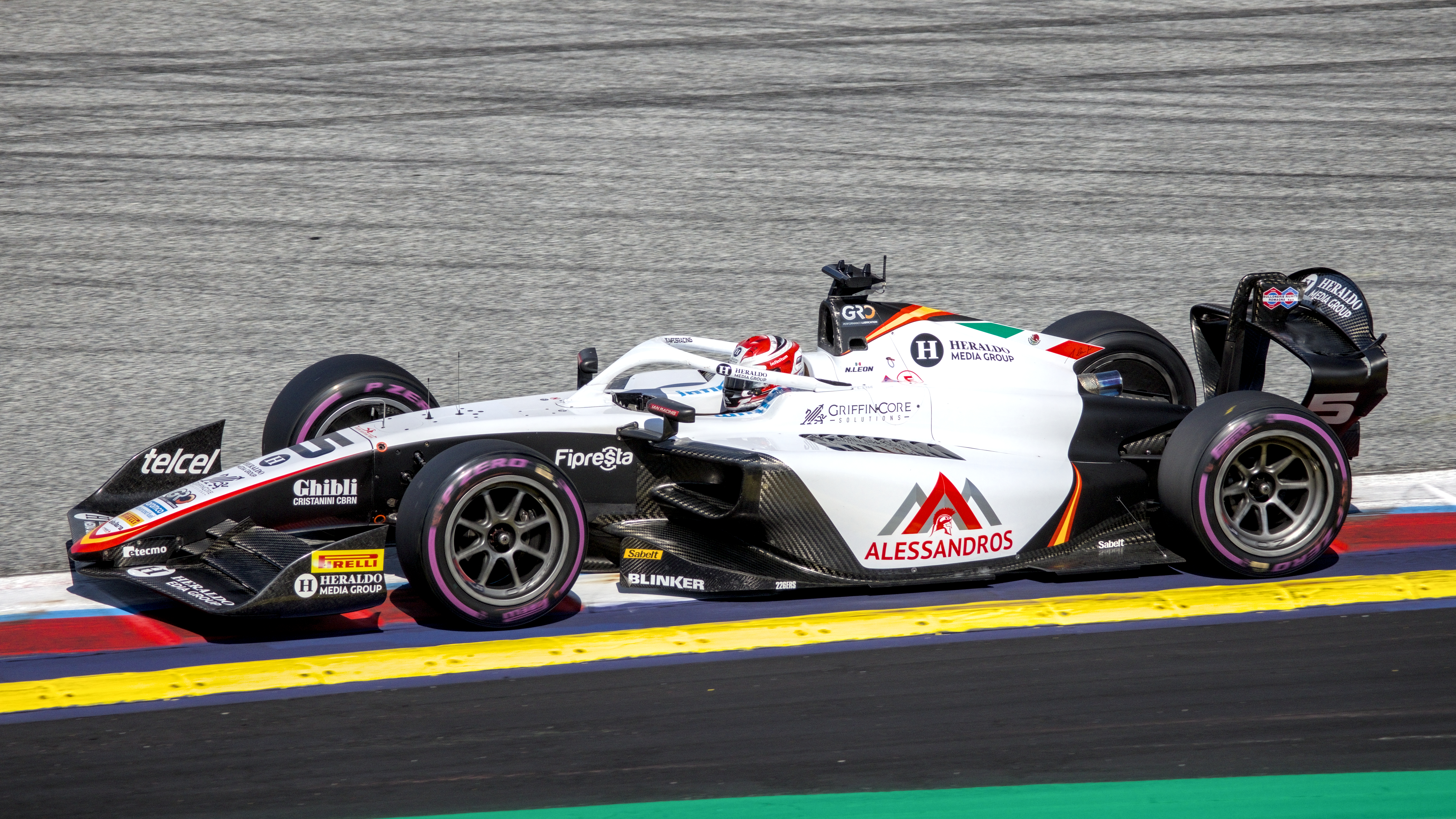
León driving the Dallara F2 2024 during the 2026 Spielberg Formula 2 round

León was promoted to Formula 2 for 2026, joining Campos Racing alongside Red Bull junior Nikola Tsolov.

=== Formula One ===
On 14 January 2022 Red Bull announced that León would be joining the Red Bull Junior Team in the form of a supported driver. His contract only lasted a year and he was dropped by the team at the start of 2023. Months after, León revealed that he had not received adequate support prior to the start of his first racing season in Europe, adding that he was disappointed that the programme had not "put [him] in a top three team", contrary to previous promise.

== Personal life ==
León was born in Monterrey and began competitive karting in 2013. During the off-season, León often trains with fellow Mexican drivers Pato O'Ward and Sergio Pérez.

== Karting record ==
=== Karting career summary ===
Season	Series	Team	Position
2013	Rotax Max Challenge Grand Finals – Micro Max		35th
2014	Florida Winter Tour – Rotax Micro Max	Kart Guero	31st
2016	SKUSA SuperNationals XX – Mini Swift		59th
2016	Rotax Max Challenge Grand Finals – Mini Max		19th
2017	Rotax Max Challenge Mexico, Noreste – Juniors		3rd
2017	Rotax Max Challenge Grand Finals — Junior	Noel León	18th
2019	CIK-FIA European Championship — KZ2	CRG SpA	NC
2019	CIK-FIA International Super Cup — KZ2	CRG SpA	NC
2019	SKUSA Pro Tour – X30 Junior		16th
2019	SKUSA SuperNationals XXIII – X30 Junior		23rd
2022	SKUSA SuperNationals XXV - X30 Senior	CRG Nordam	5th
2023	Rotax Max Challenge Winter Trophy - Senior Max		2nd

== Racing record ==
=== Racing career summary ===
Season	Series	Team	Races	Wins	Poles	F/Laps	Podiums	Points	Position
2017–18	NACAM Formula 4 Championship	Ram Racing	3	0	0	0	2	45	12th
2018	FB-BOHN Mikel's Trucks	N/A	1	0	0	0	0	34	25th
2018–19	NACAM Formula 4 Championship	Ram Racing	2	0	0	0	1	27	11th
2019–20	NACAM Formula 4 Championship	Ram Racing	20	7	10	5	15	325	**1st**
2020	SC Súper Copa Mercedes Benz	Sidral Aga Racing Team	10	1	1	0	2	868	10th
2020	Tractocamiones Freightliner	N/A	1	0	0	0	0	N/A	NC
2021	Formula 4 United States Championship	DEForce Racing	17	2	3	1	11	212	**1st**
2021	NASCAR Challenge Series – Mexico	Alessandros Racing	11	7	4	5	9	317	**1st**
2021	GTM Gran Turismo Mexico	Sidral Aga	2	1	1	0	1	166	15th
2022	Formula Regional European Championship	Arden Motorsport	20	0	0	0	0	3	23rd
2023	Euroformula Open Championship	Team Motopark	23	7	5	11	16	394	**1st**
2023	NASCAR Mexico Challenge Series		?	?	?	?	?	10	19th
2023	Macau Grand Prix	Van Amersfoort Racing	1	0	0	0	0	N/A	19th
2024	FIA Formula 3 Championship	Van Amersfoort Racing	20	0	0	1	4	79	10th
2024	Macau Grand Prix	KCMG IXO by Pinnacle Motorsport	1	0	0	0	1	N/A	**3rd**
2025	FIA Formula 3 Championship	Prema Racing	19	0	0	1	2	36	17th
2026	FIA Formula 2 Championship	Campos Racing	18	3	1	3	4	94*	5th*

* Season still in progress.

=== Complete NACAM Formula 4 Championship results ===
(key) (Races in bold indicate pole position) (Races in italics indicate fastest lap)

Year	Team	1	2	3	4	5	6	7	8	9	10	11	12	13	14	15	16	17	18	19	20	21	22	DC	Points
2017–18	Ram Racing	AHR1; 1	AHR1; 2	AHR2; 1	AHR2; 2	EDM; 1	EDM; 2	EDM; 3	PUE; 1	PUE; 2	PUE; 3	AGS; 1	AGS; 2	AGS; 3	MER; 1	MER; 2	MER; 3	MTY; 1; 3	MTY; 2; 2	MTY; 3; 4	AHR3; 1	AHR3; 2	AHR3; 3	12th	45
2018–19	Ram Racing	AHR1; 1; 3	AHR1; 2; 4	PUE1; 1	PUE1; 2	PUE1; 3	SLP; 1	SLP; 2	SLP; 3	MTY; 1	MTY; 2	MTY; 3	AGS; 1	AGS; 2	AGS; 3	PUE2; 1	PUE2; 2	PUE2; 3	AHR2; 1	AHR2; 2	AHR2; 3			11th	27
2019–20	Ram Racing	**AHR**; **1**; 2	AHR; 2; 1	AGS; 1; 2	AGS; 2; 3	AGS; 3; 1	PUE; 1; 2	PUE; 2; 3	**PUE**; **3**; 1	**MER**; **1**; 1	MER; 2; 3	**MER**; **3** Ret	**QUE1**; **1**; 5	QUE1; 2 Ret	**QUE1**; **3**; 1	**QUE2**; **1**; 11	QUE2; 2; 6	**QUE2**; **3**; 1	**MTY**; **1**; 2	MTY; 2; 3	**MTY**; **3**; 1			1st	325

=== Complete Formula 4 United States Championship results ===
(key) (Races in bold indicate pole position) (Races in italics indicate fastest lap)

Year	Team	1	2	3	4	5	6	7	8	9	10	11	12	13	14	15	16	17	DC	Points
2021	DEForce Racing	**ATL**; **1**; 2	ATL; 2; 2	ATL; 3; 1	ROA; 1; 4	ROA; 2; 2	ROA; 3; 8	**MOH**; **1**; 5	MOH; 2; 1	MOH; 3; 2	BRA; 1; 16	BRA; 2; 4	BRA; 3 Ret	**VIR**; **1**; 8	VIR; 2; 3	VIR; 3; 2	**COA**; **1**; 2	COA; 2; 2	1st	212

=== Complete Formula Regional European Championship results ===
(key) (Races in bold indicate pole position) (Races in italics indicate fastest lap)

Year	Team	1	2	3	4	5	6	7	8	9	10	11	12	13	14	15	16	17	18	19	20	DC	Points
2022	Arden Motorsport	MNZ; 1; 21	MNZ; 2; 25	IMO; 1; 22	IMO; 2; 15	MCO; 1; 10	MCO; 2; 9	LEC; 1; 17	LEC; 2; 20	ZAN; 1; 24	ZAN; 2; 17	HUN; 1; 13	HUN; 2; 17	SPA; 1; 22	SPA; 2 Ret	RBR; 1; 12	RBR; 2; 12	CAT; 1; 12	CAT; 2; 17	MUG; 1; 24	MUG; 2; 27	23rd	3

=== Complete Euroformula Open Championship results ===
(key) (Races in bold indicate pole position) (Races in italics indicate fastest lap)

Year	Team	1	2	3	4	5	6	7	8	9	10	11	12	13	14	15	16	17	18	19	20	21	22	23	Pos	Points
2023	Team Motopark	PRT; 1; 3*	PRT; 2; 5	PRT; 3; 1	**SPA**; **1**; 1	SPA; 2; 2*	SPA; 3; 3	**HUN**; **1**; 1	HUN; 2; 4	HUN; 3; 3*	**LEC**; **1** Ret	LEC; 2; 7	LEC; 3; 2*	**RBR**; **1**; 1	RBR; 2; 1*	RBR; 3; 2*	**MNZ**; **1**; 1	MNZ; 2 Ret	MNZ; 3; 2	MUG; 1; 1*	MUG; 2; 3*	CAT; 1 Ret	CAT; 2; 4	CAT; 3; 3	1st	394

* – Most positions gained

=== Complete Macau Grand Prix results ===
Year	Team	Car	Qualifying	Quali Race	Main race
2023	(Netherlands) Van Amersfoort Racing	Dallara F3 2019	19th	17th	19th
2024	(Republic of Ireland) KCMG IXO by Pinnacle Motorsport	Tatuus F3 T318	**3rd**	**3rd**	**3rd**

=== Complete FIA Formula 3 Championship results ===
(key) (Races in bold indicate pole position) (Races in italics indicate fastest lap)

Year	Entrant	1	2	3	4	5	6	7	8	9	10	11	12	13	14	15	16	17	18	19	20	DC	Points
2024	Van Amersfoort Racing	BHR; SPR; 22	BHR; FEA; 12	MEL; SPR; Ret	MEL; FEA; 25	IMO; SPR; 3	IMO; FEA; 19	MON; SPR; 4	MON; FEA; 23	CAT; SPR; 6	CAT; FEA; 9	RBR; SPR; 9	RBR; FEA; 23	SIL; SPR; 2	SIL; FEA; 10	HUN; SPR; 12	HUN; FEA; 2	SPA; SPR; 3	SPA; FEA; 4	MNZ; SPR; Ret	MNZ; FEA; 7	10th	79
2025	Prema Racing	MEL; SPR; 10	MEL; FEA; 13	BHR; SPR; 11	BHR; FEA; 17	IMO; SPR; 9	IMO; FEA; 28†	MON; SPR; Ret	MON; FEA; Ret	CAT; SPR; 10	CAT; FEA; 18	RBR; SPR; 10	RBR; FEA; 11	SIL; SPR; 7	SIL; FEA; 3	SPA; SPR; 15	SPA; FEA; C	HUN; SPR; Ret	HUN; FEA; 17	MNZ; SPR; 19	MNZ; FEA; 3	17th	36

=== Complete FIA Formula 2 Championship results ===
(key) (Races in bold indicate pole position) (Races in italics indicate fastest lap)

Year	Entrant	1	2	3	4	5	6	7	8	9	10	11	12	13	14	15	16	17	18	19	20	21	22	23	24	25	26	27	28	29	DC	Points
2026	Campos Racing	MEL; SPR; 2	MEL; FEA; 14	MIA; SPR; 9	MIA; FEA; 4	MTL; SPR; 1	MTL; FEA; 10	MON; SPR; 1	MON; FEA; 9	CAT; SPR; 4	CAT; FEA; 8	RBR; SPR; 10	**RBR**; **FEA**; 7	SIL; SPR; 12	SIL; FEA; 7	SPA; SPR; Ret	SPA; FEA; DSQ	HUN; SPR; 9	HUN; FEA; 1	MNZ; SPR; 4	MNZ; FEA; 3	MAD; SPR; 4	MAD; FEA; 16	BAK; SPR; 20†	BAK; FEA1; 5	BAK; FEA2; 8	LSL; SPR	LSL; FEA	YMC; SPR	YMC; FEA	6th*	133*

* Season still in progress.

Sporting positions
Preceded by Oliver Goethe	Euroformula Open Championship; 2023	Succeeded by Brad Benavides
