= Bryce Aron =

American racing driver (born 2003)

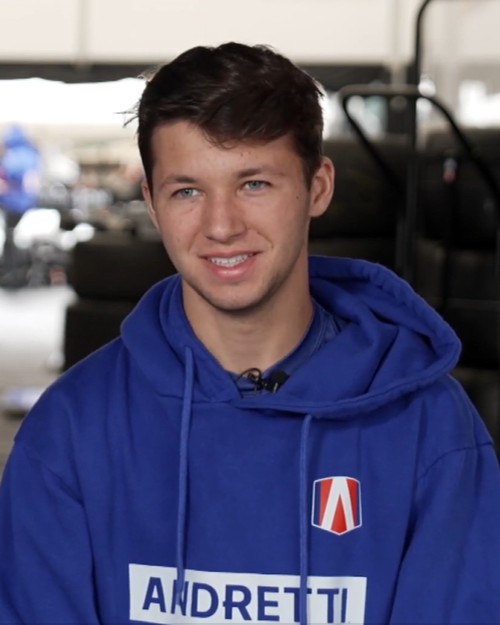
- Aron in 2024
- Nationality: (United States) American
- Born: September 30, 2003 (age 23) Winnetka, Illinois, United States

Indy NXT career
- Debut season: 2024
- Current team: Cape Motorsports
- Categorisation: FIA Silver
- Car number: 21
- Former teams: Andretti Global, HMD Motorsports
- Starts: 30
- Championships: 0
- Wins: 0
- Podiums: 2
- Poles: 0
- Fastest laps: 1
- Best finish: 9th in 2024

Previous series
- 2024 2023 2021–2022 2020 2019: FR Oceania Championship; Euroformula Open Championship; GB3 Championship; UK National Formula Ford; US National FF1600; SCCA Majors

Bryce Aron (born September 30, 2003) is an American racing driver who will compete in the 2027 Indy NXT Championship for Cape Motorsports powered by Ed Carpenter Racing. A multiple-time race winner in European open-wheel competition, Aron has also competed in the premier GTP class of the IMSA SportsCar Championship, finishing sixth overall on his debut at the 2025 24 Hours of Daytona. Aron tested for Jaguar TCS Racing in Formula E at the Madrid test.

Aron completed his 2024 rookie Indy NXT season with Andretti Global, earning two podium finishes, three top-five and eight top-10 results. Aron joined Chip Ganassi Racing before the 2025 Grand Prix of Alabama as the team re-entered Indy NXT after a 17-year absence. Aron was Chip Ganassi Racing's highest-placed driver in the 2026 championship.

During 2023, Aron achieved three wins and five podiums in the Euroformula Open Championship with Motopark Academy, finishing fourth overall largely as a result of forgoing the final three races. He was also a race winner in the 2024 Formula Regional Oceania Championship with M2 Competition and a race winner in the 2022 GB3 Championship with Hitech GP, as well as the first American to record top-five finishes in both the Formula Ford Festival and the Walter Hayes Trophy.

== Single-seater career ==
=== Formula Ford ===
==== BRSCC National Formula Ford Championship ====
In 2020, Aron moved to the UK to compete with Low Dempsey Racing in the BRSCC National Formula Ford Championship. Due to the COVID-19 pandemic, the championship was shortened to just three rounds and seven races and Aron finished fifth in the standings, having won pole position in the penultimate round at Brands Hatch.In order to supplement the shortened race calendar, Low Dempsey Racing participated in a variety of additional series including the Champion of Brands, Champion of Cadwell and the majority of the Castle Combe Championship. Aron won the Champion of Cadwell.

==== 2020 Team USA Scholarship Winner ====
Aron was one of three winners of the 2020 Team USA Scholarship. At the Formula Ford Festival Aron finished third in the semi-final. In the final, Aron “ran strongly in third place until being elbowed down to fifth following a late-race Safety Car interruption.” Aron then went on to the Walter Hayes Trophy, where out of 103 drivers he finished on the podium in third place, having been the seventh American to finish on the Walter Hayes Podium. Aron made history as the first American to finish with a top-five result and a podium finish in the two end of year events.

=== GB3 Championship ===
==== 2021 ====
Aron joined Carlin for 2021, progressing to the GB3 Championship alongside teammates O’Sullivan and Mansell. Aron had what was hailed as a stunning debut at Brands Hatch where he made bold moves to end the race weekend with a fourth-place finish.

==== 2022 ====
In 2022, Aron joined Hitech GP where he contributed to their first GB3 championship team's win. Aron scored eight top-ten finishes, five of which came during the last two rounds. Aron ended the season by out-qualifying his championshhip winning teammate and then scoring a podium finish in race 2. Aron scored three podiums and a win in the 2022 championship.

=== Super Formula ===
At the end of 2022, Aron partook in Super Formula tests with B-Max Racing at Okayama and Suzuka. Aron was consistently in the top-five and as high as second fastest in the sessions in which he participated.

=== Euroformula Open ===
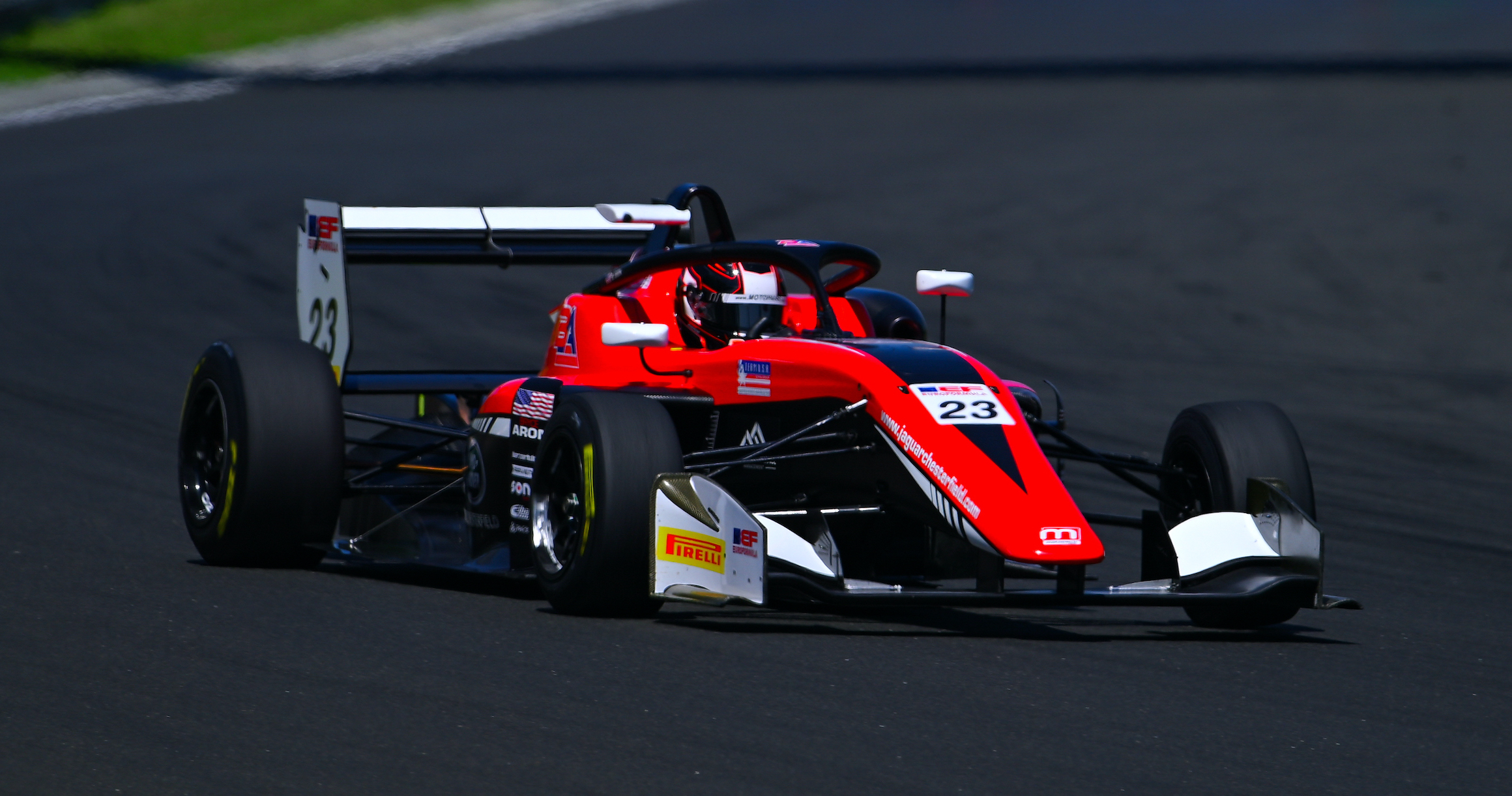
Aron en route to win at the Hungaroring in 2023

In 2023 Aron moved to the Euroformula Open Championship with Team Motopark. By the summer break he was tied with Noel León for race wins and was second in the standings, 17 points behind León. A scheduling conflict with Indy NXT forced Aron to miss the final three races in Barcelona. As a result he finished the season fourth overall with three wins and five podiums.

=== Formula Regional Oceania ===
Aron competed in the final two rounds of the 2024 Formula Regional Oceania Championship. Aron won at the Highlands Motorsports Park, during the New Zealand Grand Prix race weekend. In his first weekend in the Formula Regional car, Aron scored fastest race lap at Euromarque Motorsports Park. Aron was the only American and the only Indy NXT driver to score a win in the 2024 Formula Regional Oceania Championship.

=== Indy NXT ===
==== 2024 ====
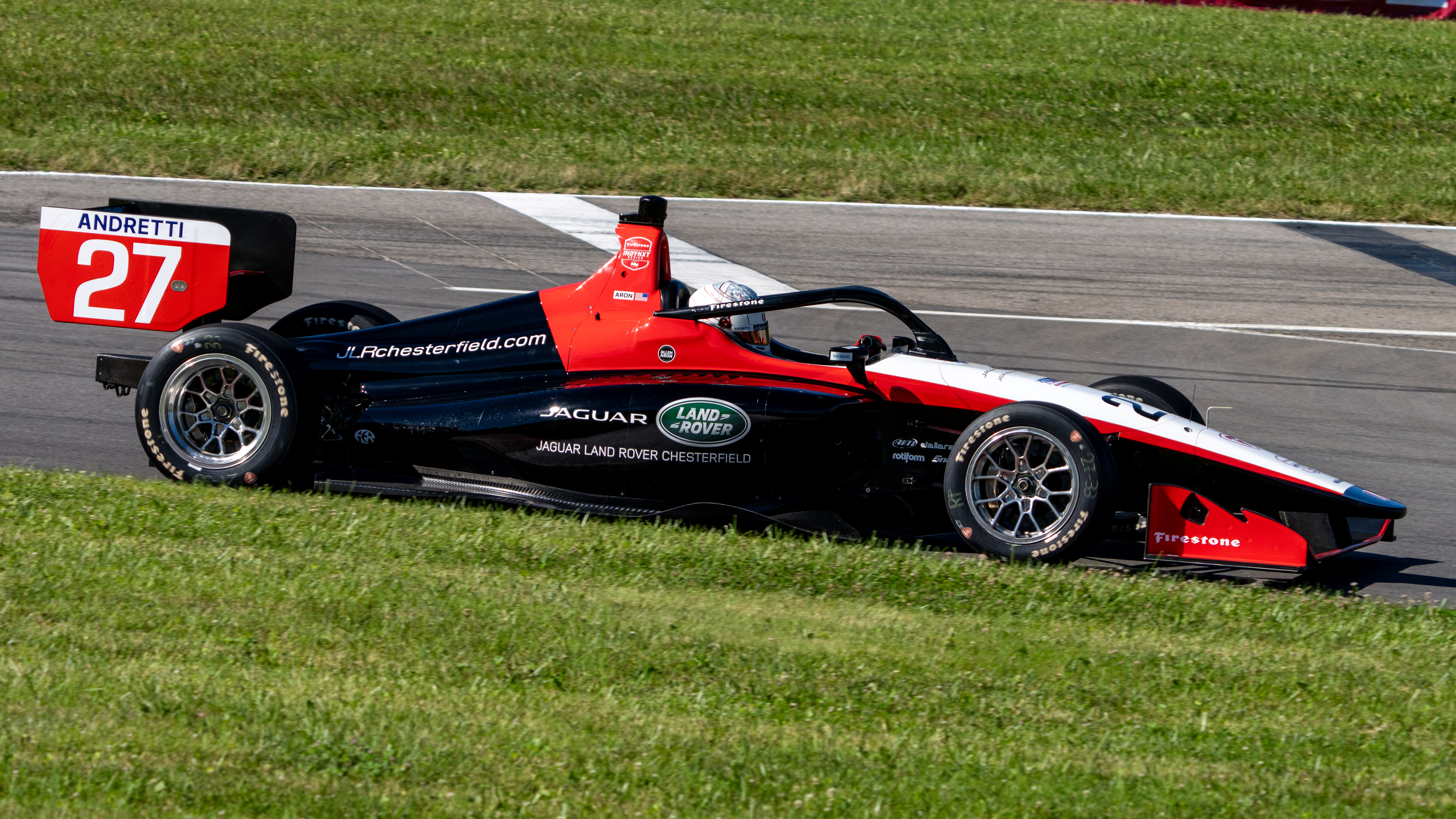
Aron's 2024 Indy NXT car

Aron moved to America in 2024, joining Andretti Global to race in the Indy NXT Championship. Aron scored podium finishes at both WeatherTech Laguna Seca Raceway and Portland International Raceway. During the second half of the season, Aron outscored his Andretti teammates with the exception of series champion Louis Foster.

==== 2025 ====
Aron moved to the No. 9 car for Chip Ganassi Racing, for his second season in Indy NXT. Aron finished the season with strong results including a top-five at the Milwaukee Mile.

==== 2026 ====
Aron continued with Chip Ganassi Racing in 2026,Aron was Chip Ganassi Racing's highest-placed driver in the 2026 championship, outscoring all three of his teammates by at least 30 points.

=== Formula E ===
In March 2026, Aron joined Jaguar TCS Racing to participate in the Formula E rookie test at the 2026 Madrid ePrix.

== Sportscar racing career ==
=== IMSA SportsCar Championship ===
In January 2025, it was announced that Aron would be making his sports car racing debut in the IMSA WeatherTech SportsCar Championship for the 24 Hours of Daytona, racing in the GTP class, with JDC-Miller Motorsports in the Porsche 963 Hypercar, alongside teammates Gianmaria Bruni, Tijmen van der Helm, and Pascal Wehrlein. Aron finished sixth overall on his GTP debut.

In November 2025, Aron returned to JDC-Miller MotorSports for the IMSA Sanctioned Test at Daytona International Speedway, where he set the third-fastest time in the third session and the quickest time of any Porsche 963 driver.

== Racing record ==
=== Racing career summary ===
Season	Series	Team	Races	Wins	Poles	F/Laps	Podiums	Points	Position
2019	SCCA Majors Championship Nationwide - Formula F	N/A	6	0	?	?	2	87	10th
2019	SCCA Hoosier Super Tour - Formula Ford	K-Hill Motorsports	2	0	2	1	2	N/A	NC
2019	F1600 Championship Series	K-Hill Motorsports	20	0	0	1	8	639	**3rd**
2019	Formula Ford Festival - Pro class - Heats/Semi	Oldfield Motorsport	3	0	0	0	0	N/A	NC
2020	National FF1600 Championship	Low Dempsey Racing	7	0	1	0	0	N/A	5th
2020	Formula Ford Festival - Semi	Low Dempsey Racing	1	0	0	1	1	N/A	**3rd**
2020	Formula Ford Festival	Low Dempsey Racing	1	0	0	0	0	N/A	5th
2020	Walter Hayes Trophy	Low Dempsey Racing	1	0	0	0	1	N/A	**3rd**
2020	Formula Ford 1600 Castle Combe Championship	Low Dempsey Racing	6	0	0	2	5	N/A	N/A
2020	Champion of Cadwell	Low Dempsey Racing	2	1	2	2	2	N/A	**1st**
2020	Champion of Brands	Low Dempsey Racing	3	0	1	2	3	N/A	N/A
2021	GB3 Championship	Carlin	24	0	0	0	0	237	12th
2022	GB3 Championship	Hitech Grand Prix	24	1	0	0	3	215	12th
2023	Euroformula Open Championship	Team Motopark	20	3	0	1	5	238	4th
2024	Formula Regional Oceania Championship	M2 Competition	6	1	0	1	1	102	15th
2024	Indy NXT	Andretti Global	14	0	0	0	2	302	9th
2025	IMSA SportsCar Championship - GTP	JDC-Miller MotorSports	1	0	0	0	0	276	35th
2025	Indy NXT	HMD Motorsports	1	0	0	0	0	260	11th
2025	Indy NXT	Chip Ganassi Racing	13	0	0	0	0	260	11th
2026	Indy NXT	Chip Ganassi Racing	17	0	0	1	0	298	14th
2027	Indy NXT	Cape Motorsports Powered by ECR	0	0	0	0	0	0	TBD

* Season still in progress

=== Complete GB3 Championship results ===
(key) (Races in bold indicate pole position) (Races in italics indicate fastest lap)

Year	Entrant	1	2	3	4	5	6	7	8	9	10	11	12	13	14	15	16	17	18	19	20	21	22	23	24	DC	Points
2021	Carlin	BRH; 1; 10	BRH; 2; 9	BRH; 3; 4^{4}	SIL; 1; 9	SIL; 2; 11	SIL; 3 DSQ	DON1; 1; 13	DON1; 2; 11	DON1; 3; 4^{2}	SPA; 1; 10	SPA; 2; 11	SPA; 3; 14	SNE; 1; 11	SNE; 2; 6	SNE; 3; 13	SIL2; 1; 10	SIL2; 2; 11	SIL2; 3; 7	OUL; 1; 14	OUL; 2; 8	OUL; 3; 13	DON2; 1; 6	DON2; 2; 6	DON2; 3; 14	12th	237
2022	Hitech Grand Prix	OUL; 1; 12	OUL; 2; 15	OUL; 3; 17^{4}	SIL1; 1; 19	SIL1; 2; 12	SIL1; 3; 3^{3}	DON1; 1; 12	DON1; 2; 19	DON1; 3; 1	SNE; 1; 11	SNE; 2; 13	SNE; 3 DSQ	SPA; 1; 9	SPA; 2; 14	SPA; 3; 21	SIL2; 1; 16	SIL2; 2 Ret	SIL2; 3; 14^{7}	BRH; 1; 8	BRH; 2; 7	BRH; 3; 10^{1}	DON2; 1; 6	DON2; 2; 3	DON2; 3; 13^{5}	12th	215

=== Complete Euroformula Open Championship results ===
(key) (Races in bold indicate pole position) (Races in italics indicate fastest lap)

Year	Team	1	2	3	4	5	6	7	8	9	10	11	12	13	14	15	16	17	18	19	20	21	22	23	Pos	Points
2023	Team Motopark	EST; 1; 5	EST; 2; 4	EST; 3; 4	SPA; 1; 3*	SPA; 2; 1	SPA; 3; 5	HUN; 1; 6	HUN; 2; 1	HUN; 3; 4	LEC; 1; 3	LEC; 2; 1	LEC; 3; 4	RBR; 1; 6	RBR; 2; 6	RBR; 3; 6	MNZ; 1; 7	MNZ; 2 Ret	MNZ; 3; 5	MUG; 1; 5	MUG; 2; 8	CAT; 1 WD	CAT; 2 WD	CAT; 3 WD	4th	238

=== Complete Formula Regional Oceania Championship results ===
(key) (Races in bold indicate pole position) (Races in italics indicate fastest lap)

Year	Team	1	2	3	4	5	6	7	8	9	10	11	12	13	14	15	DC	Points
2024	M2 Competition	TAU; 1	TAU; 2	TAU; 3	MAN; 1	MAN; 2	MAN; 3	HMP; 1	HMP; 2	HMP; 3	RUA; 1; 9	RUA; 2; 10	RUA; 3; 4	HIG; 1; 7	HIG; 2; 1	HIG; 3; 6	15th	102

=== Complete American open–wheel racing results ===
==== Indy NXT ====
(key) (Races in bold indicate pole position) (Races in italics indicate fastest lap) (Races with ^{L} indicate a race lap led) (Races with * indicate most race laps led)

Year	Team	1	2	3	4	5	6	7	8	9	10	11	12	13	14	15	16	17	Rank	Points
2024	Andretti Global	STP; 19	BAR; 8	IMS; 14	IMS; 19	DET; 20	RDA; 8	LAG; 16	LAG; 3	MOH; 18	IOW; 8	GMP; 6	POR; 3	MIL; 4	NSH; 7				9th	302
2025	HMD Motorsports	STP; 13																	11th	260
2025	Chip Ganassi Racing		BAR; 15	IMS; 15	IMS; 15	DET; 10	GMP; 14	RDA; 9	MOH; 12	IOW; 9	LAG; 10	LAG; 19	POR; 19	MIL; 5	NSH; 6				11th	260
2026	Chip Ganassi Racing	STP; 18	ARL; 18	BAR; 8	BAR; 7	IMS; 22	IMS; 12	DET; 8	GAT; 23	ROA; 21	ROA; 10	MOH; 16	MOH; 14	NSS; 10	POR; 16	MIL; 8	LAG; 6	LAG; 9	14th	298

* Season still in progress.

=== Complete IMSA SportsCar Championship results ===
(key) (Races in bold indicate pole position; races in italics indicate fastest lap)

Year	Entrant	Class	Make	Engine	1	2	3	4	5	6	7	8	9	Rank	Points
2025	JDC-Miller MotorSports	GTP	Porsche	9RD 4.6 L V8	DAY; 6	SEB	LBH	LGA	DET	WGL	ELK	IMS	PET	35th	276

^{*} Season still in progress.
