= 2023 Euroformula Open Championship =

2023 formula racing championship

The 2023 Euroformula Open Championship was a multi-event motor racing championship for single-seater open wheel formula racing cars held across Europe. The championship featured drivers competing in Euroformula Open Championship specification Dallara 320 chassis cars. It was the tenth Euroformula Open Championship season.

The season consisted of seven race weekends, started in late April and will span until October.

Team Motopark won the Teams' Championship with six races to spare. Their driver Noel León won the Drivers' Championship with three races to spare. Jakob Bergmeister, also driving for the same team (and its offshoot in the final round), won the Rookies' Championship.

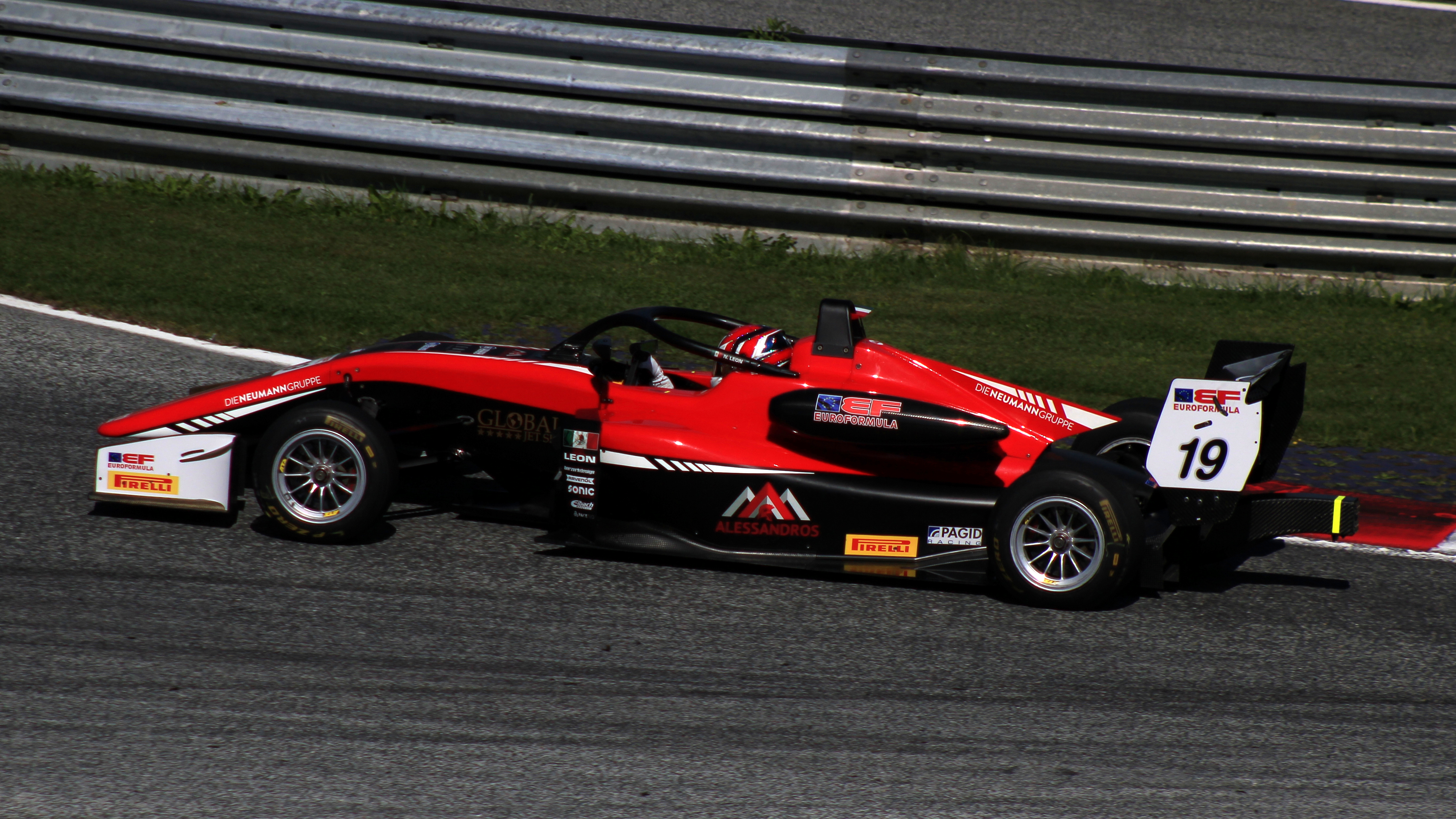
Drivers' Champion Noel León (Team Motopark) in his Dallara 320 during the round at the Red Bull Ring

== Teams and drivers ==
All teams utilized the Dallara 320 chassis. The 2023 season was scheduled to see a body kit upgrade for the chassis as well as the introduction of larger 17-inch tyres, but these plans were later scrapped. The tyre supplier was originally changed from Michelin to Hankook, before being changed again to Pirelli ahead of the second round of the season. A Gold Cup was introduced for drivers aged 35 and above. A trophy at every race was awarded for the winning driver in the category, but no classification or points system was introduced.

Team	Engine	No.	Driver	Status	Rounds
(Japan) CryptoTower Racing Team	Volkswagen	5	(Austria) Charlie Wurz		5–8
(Japan) CryptoTower Racing Team	Volkswagen	6	Vladislav Ryabov (Note: Ryabov is Russian, but he competed as a neutral competitor as Russian national emblems were banned by the FIA following the Russian invasion of Ukraine.)	R	4
(Japan) CryptoTower Racing Team	Volkswagen	15	(Italy) Enzo Trulli		1, 8
(Japan) CryptoTower Racing Team	Volkswagen	20	(Hungary) Benjámin Berta		3
(Japan) CryptoTower Racing Team	Volkswagen	21	(United Kingdom) Josh Mason		2–3
(Japan) CryptoTower Racing Team	Volkswagen	26	(Germany) Jakob Bergmeister	R	8
(Japan) CryptoTower Racing Team	Volkswagen	39	(Hong Kong) Gerrard Xie	R	2
(Japan) CryptoTower Racing Team	Volkswagen	69	(Switzerland) Joshua Dufek		5–7
(Japan) CryptoTower Racing Team	Volkswagen	77	(Germany) Tim Tramnitz		1
(Japan) CryptoTower Racing Team	Volkswagen	99	(Hungary) Attila Pénzes		4
(Czech Republic) Effective Racing	Mercedes-Benz	7	(Czech Republic) Vladimír Netušil	G	1–3, 5–6, 8
(Japan) Noda Racing	Volkswagen	10	(Japan) Juju Noda	R	1–5
(Germany) Team Motopark	Volkswagen	11	(Hungary) Levente Révész		6–8
(Germany) Team Motopark	Volkswagen	19	(Mexico) Noel León		All
(Germany) Team Motopark	Volkswagen	23	(United States) Bryce Aron		All
(Germany) Team Motopark	Volkswagen	26	(Germany) Jakob Bergmeister	R	1–5
(Germany) Team Motopark	Volkswagen	73	(United Kingdom) Cian Shields		All
(Italy) BVM Racing	Volkswagen	84	(Italy) Francesco Simonazzi		All
(Serbia) NV Racing	Volkswagen	212	(Serbia) Paolo Brajnik	G	1–3, 5, 7

Icon	Status
R	Rookie
G	Gold Cup

== Race calendar ==
A provisional eight-round calendar was announced at the penultimate round of the 2022 championship, on 22 September 2022. This planned schedule saw the rounds at Imola, Estoril and the Pau Grand Prix leaving the calendar, with rounds at Algarve and Mugello added instead. The calendar was updated on 24 January 2023, with a race in Pau reintroduced to the schedule. The Pau race was to replace the round at Mugello. However, on 5 May 2023, the series announced the cancellation of its races across the Pau Grand Prix weekend because of their refusal to be in Pau as support race, and not as Pau Grand Prix title race (due to local sponsorship reasons, the main races were supposed to take place with environmental friendly-fuel). On 17 May 2023, the Mugello round was reinstated into the calendar as a replacement for the Pau Grand Prix.

Round		Circuit	Date	Supporting	Map of circuit locations
1	R1	(Portugal) Algarve International Circuit, Portimão	29 April	International GT Open; TCR Europe Touring Car Series; TCR World Tour; Campeonato de Portugal de Velocidade	2023 Euroformula Open Championship is located in Europe
1	R2	(Portugal) Algarve International Circuit, Portimão	30 April	International GT Open; TCR Europe Touring Car Series; TCR World Tour; Campeonato de Portugal de Velocidade	2023 Euroformula Open Championship is located in Europe
1	R3	(Portugal) Algarve International Circuit, Portimão	30 April	International GT Open; TCR Europe Touring Car Series; TCR World Tour; Campeonato de Portugal de Velocidade	2023 Euroformula Open Championship is located in Europe
2	R1	(Belgium) Circuit de Spa-Francorchamps, Stavelot	27 May	International GT Open; GT Cup Open Europe; TCR Europe Touring Car Series; TCR World Tour	2023 Euroformula Open Championship is located in Europe
2	R2	(Belgium) Circuit de Spa-Francorchamps, Stavelot	28 May	International GT Open; GT Cup Open Europe; TCR Europe Touring Car Series; TCR World Tour	2023 Euroformula Open Championship is located in Europe
2	R3	(Belgium) Circuit de Spa-Francorchamps, Stavelot	28 May	International GT Open; GT Cup Open Europe; TCR Europe Touring Car Series; TCR World Tour	2023 Euroformula Open Championship is located in Europe
3	R1	(Hungary) Hungaroring, Mogyoród	17 June	International GT Open; GT Cup Open Europe; TCR Europe Touring Car Series; TCR World Tour	2023 Euroformula Open Championship is located in Europe
3	R2	(Hungary) Hungaroring, Mogyoród	18 June	International GT Open; GT Cup Open Europe; TCR Europe Touring Car Series; TCR World Tour	2023 Euroformula Open Championship is located in Europe
3	R3	(Hungary) Hungaroring, Mogyoród	18 June	International GT Open; GT Cup Open Europe; TCR Europe Touring Car Series; TCR World Tour	2023 Euroformula Open Championship is located in Europe
4	R1	(France) Circuit Paul Ricard, Le Castellet	22 July	International GT Open; GT Cup Open Europe; TCR Europe Touring Car Series; Formula Regional European Championship	2023 Euroformula Open Championship is located in Europe
4	R2	(France) Circuit Paul Ricard, Le Castellet	23 July	International GT Open; GT Cup Open Europe; TCR Europe Touring Car Series; Formula Regional European Championship	2023 Euroformula Open Championship is located in Europe
4	R3	(France) Circuit Paul Ricard, Le Castellet	23 July	International GT Open; GT Cup Open Europe; TCR Europe Touring Car Series; Formula Regional European Championship	2023 Euroformula Open Championship is located in Europe
5	R1	(Austria) Red Bull Ring, Spielberg	9 September	International GT Open; Formula Regional European Championship; Porsche Carrera Cup France; Renault Clio Cup	2023 Euroformula Open Championship is located in Europe
5	R2	(Austria) Red Bull Ring, Spielberg	10 September	International GT Open; Formula Regional European Championship; Porsche Carrera Cup France; Renault Clio Cup	2023 Euroformula Open Championship is located in Europe
5	R3	(Austria) Red Bull Ring, Spielberg	10 September	International GT Open; Formula Regional European Championship; Porsche Carrera Cup France; Renault Clio Cup	2023 Euroformula Open Championship is located in Europe
6	R1	(Italy) Autodromo Nazionale di Monza, Monza	23 September	International GT Open; GT Cup Open Europe; TCR Europe Touring Car Series	2023 Euroformula Open Championship is located in Europe
6	R2	(Italy) Autodromo Nazionale di Monza, Monza	24 September	International GT Open; GT Cup Open Europe; TCR Europe Touring Car Series	2023 Euroformula Open Championship is located in Europe
6	R3	(Italy) Autodromo Nazionale di Monza, Monza	24 September	International GT Open; GT Cup Open Europe; TCR Europe Touring Car Series	2023 Euroformula Open Championship is located in Europe
7	R1	(Italy) Mugello Circuit, Scarperia e San Piero	30 September	Italian GT Championship; Italian F4 Championship	2023 Euroformula Open Championship is located in Europe
7	R2	(Italy) Mugello Circuit, Scarperia e San Piero	1 October	Italian GT Championship; Italian F4 Championship	2023 Euroformula Open Championship is located in Europe
8	R1	(Spain) Circuit de Barcelona-Catalunya, Montmeló	21 October	International GT Open; GT Cup Open Europe; TCR Europe Touring Car Series; Euro 4 Championship	2023 Euroformula Open Championship is located in Europe
8	R2	(Spain) Circuit de Barcelona-Catalunya, Montmeló	22 October	International GT Open; GT Cup Open Europe; TCR Europe Touring Car Series; Euro 4 Championship	2023 Euroformula Open Championship is located in Europe
8	R3	(Spain) Circuit de Barcelona-Catalunya, Montmeló	22 October	International GT Open; GT Cup Open Europe; TCR Europe Touring Car Series; Euro 4 Championship	2023 Euroformula Open Championship is located in Europe

== Race results ==
Round		Circuit	Pole position	Fastest lap	Most positions gained	Winning driver	Winning team	Rookie winner	Gold Cup winner
1	R1	(Portugal) Algarve International Circuit	(Italy) Enzo Trulli	(Germany) Tim Tramnitz	(Mexico) Noel León	(Italy) Enzo Trulli	(Japan) CryptoTower Racing Team	(Japan) Juju Noda	No classified finishers
1	R2	(Portugal) Algarve International Circuit		(Mexico) Noel León	(Italy) Enzo Trulli	(Italy) Francesco Simonazzi	(Italy) BVM Racing	(Germany) Jakob Bergmeister	(Czech Republic) Vladimír Netušil
1	R3	(Portugal) Algarve International Circuit		(Germany) Tim Tramnitz	(Germany) Tim Tramnitz	(Mexico) Noel León	(Germany) Team Motopark	(Germany) Jakob Bergmeister	(Serbia) Paolo Brajnik
2	R1	(Belgium) Spa-Francorchamps	(Mexico) Noel León	(Mexico) Noel León	(United States) Bryce Aron	(Mexico) Noel León	(Germany) Team Motopark	(Japan) Juju Noda	(Serbia) Paolo Brajnik
2	R2	(Belgium) Spa-Francorchamps		(Mexico) Noel León	(Mexico) Noel León	(United States) Bryce Aron	(Germany) Team Motopark	(Germany) Jakob Bergmeister	(Serbia) Paolo Brajnik
2	R3	(Belgium) Spa-Francorchamps		(Mexico) Noel León	(United Kingdom) Cian Shields	(United Kingdom) Cian Shields	(Germany) Team Motopark	(Japan) Juju Noda	(Czech Republic) Vladimír Netušil
3	R1	(Hungary) Hungaroring	(Mexico) Noel León	(Mexico) Noel León	(United Kingdom) Josh Mason	(Mexico) Noel León	(Germany) Team Motopark	(Japan) Juju Noda	(Czech Republic) Vladimír Netušil
3	R2	(Hungary) Hungaroring		(United States) Bryce Aron	(United Kingdom) Josh Mason	(United States) Bryce Aron	(Germany) Team Motopark	(Japan) Juju Noda	(Czech Republic) Vladimír Netušil
3	R3	(Hungary) Hungaroring		(Mexico) Noel León	(Mexico) Noel León	(United Kingdom) Josh Mason	(Japan) CryptoTower Racing Team	(Germany) Jakob Bergmeister	(Czech Republic) Vladimír Netušil
4	R1	(France) Circuit Paul Ricard	(Mexico) Noel León	(Japan) Juju Noda	(Germany) Jakob Bergmeister	(Japan) Juju Noda	(Japan) Noda Racing	(Japan) Juju Noda	No entries
4	R2	(France) Circuit Paul Ricard		(United Kingdom) Cian Shields	(Italy) Francesco Simonazzi	(United States) Bryce Aron	(Germany) Team Motopark	(Japan) Juju Noda	No entries
4	R3	(France) Circuit Paul Ricard		(United Kingdom) Cian Shields	(Mexico) Noel León	(United Kingdom) Cian Shields	(Germany) Team Motopark	(Japan) Juju Noda	No entries
5	R1	(Austria) Red Bull Ring	(Mexico) Noel León	(Mexico) Noel León	(Italy) Francesco Simonazzi	(Mexico) Noel León	(Germany) Team Motopark	(Germany) Jakob Bergmeister	(Serbia) Paolo Brajnik
5	R2	(Austria) Red Bull Ring		(Mexico) Noel León	(Mexico) Noel León	(Mexico) Noel León	(Germany) Team Motopark	(Germany) Jakob Bergmeister	(Czech Republic) Vladimír Netušil
5	R3	(Austria) Red Bull Ring		(Mexico) Noel León	(Mexico) Noel León	(United Kingdom) Cian Shields	(Germany) Team Motopark	(Germany) Jakob Bergmeister	(Serbia) Paolo Brajnik
6	R1	(Italy) Autodromo Nazionale di Monza	(Mexico) Noel León	(Mexico) Noel León	(Italy) Francesco Simonazzi	(Mexico) Noel León	(Germany) Team Motopark	No entries	No entries
6	R2	(Italy) Autodromo Nazionale di Monza		(Italy) Francesco Simonazzi	(Austria) Charlie Wurz	(Austria) Charlie Wurz	(Japan) CryptoTower Racing Team	No entries	No entries
6	R3	(Italy) Autodromo Nazionale di Monza		(Italy) Francesco Simonazzi	(Switzerland) Joshua Dufek	(Switzerland) Joshua Dufek	(Japan) CryptoTower Racing Team	No entries	No entries
7	R1	(Italy) Mugello Circuit	(Austria) Charlie Wurz	(Mexico) Noel León	(Mexico) Noel León	(Mexico) Noel León	(Germany) Team Motopark	No entries	(Serbia) Paolo Brajnik
7	R2	(Italy) Mugello Circuit		(United Kingdom) Cian Shields	(Mexico) Noel León	(United Kingdom) Cian Shields	(Germany) Team Motopark	No entries	(Serbia) Paolo Brajnik
8	R1	(Spain) Barcelona-Catalunya	(Italy) Enzo Trulli	(Austria) Charlie Wurz	(Hungary) Levente Révész	(Italy) Enzo Trulli	(Japan) CryptoTower Racing Team	(Germany) Jakob Bergmeister	No classified finishers
8	R2	(Spain) Barcelona-Catalunya		(Austria) Charlie Wurz	(Austria) Charlie Wurz	(Hungary) Levente Révész	(Germany) Team Motopark	(Germany) Jakob Bergmeister	No classified finishers
8	R3	(Spain) Barcelona-Catalunya		(Austria) Charlie Wurz	(Italy) Enzo Trulli	(Italy) Francesco Simonazzi	(Italy) BVM Racing	(Germany) Jakob Bergmeister	No classified finishers

== Season report ==
=== First half ===
The Algarve International Circuit played host for the season opener, where ten cars were present. Series returnee Enzo Trulli claimed pole position for CryptoTower Racing, and held the lead at the start of race one, while his teammate Tim Tramnitz dropped to fourth. He spent the race getting back into second, leaving Motopark's Noel León to complete the podium. His teammate Cian Shields was to start race two from pole position, but was unable to take the start, allowing BVM Racing's Francesco Simonazzi to rocket into the lead. Trulli also had a good start and ended up second. He and Tramnitz closed up to Simonazzi and had a three-way battle for the lead, where Simonazzi prevailed to win. The third race saw a brilliant win by León, who dropped to eighth at the start, but kept his determination and slowly climbed back up the order. Tramnitz finished second to make it three out of three podiums and take the championship lead, two points ahead of León. Simonazzi came third in race three and was one point further back.

Next, the championship headed to Spa, and León took pole position ahead of Shields. Both had a poor getaway in race one, allowing Simonazzi into the lead battle. Shields and Simonazzi spent a few laps battling for the lead, before León eventually got past both of them and Simonazzi started dropping back, relinquishing the final podium position to Motopark's Bryce Aron. Simonazzi claimed a brief lead with a great start in the second race, but again could not hold on to it. He got passed by Aron, who ended up winning, and León, who had climbed up the order. León attacked Aron for the lead on the final lap, but could not get past. The third race was stopped after a startline crash when CryptoTower's Gerrard Xie stalled. Shields battled his way to the lead after the restart, ahead of Simonazzi and León, before the Italian crashed out. This resulted in a race-ending red flag that allowed Simonazzi to keep his second place. In the absence of Tramnitz, León claimed the championship lead by 22 points over Simonazzi.

León continued his qualifying form to take another pole position at the Hungaroring. He cruised to the win in the first race, more than five seconds ahead of Shields and largely unchallenged. CryptoTower's Josh Mason came third after passing Simonazzi on lap one. Aron won the second race from pole by over eight seconds, while also claiming the fastest race lap. Mason started fourth and got by Simonazzi while Noda finished second. In race three Noda had another bad start, allowing Mason by into second, before he eventually took the lead past Motopark's Jakob Bergmeister. Noda battled up the order, but collided with Mason when she attempted to pass him. She sustained damage and finished ninth, allowing Bergmeister and León to take the podium spots. Aron's win helped him overtake Simonazzi in the standings, now 42 points behind León.

The first half of the season ended at Paul Ricard with a third consecutive pole position for León. The first race began with a battle for the lead between him and Simonazzi, before the pair collided. In the ensuing chaos, Noda moved into the lead before a caution was called. Noda held on to the lead for the rest of the race and claimed her maiden win ahead of Bergmeister and Aron. Multiple drivers had poor starts in race two, so Aron was able to claim the lead. Behind him, CryptoTower's debutant Vladislav Ryabov fought with multiple drivers, but eventually had to give up the podium in favour of Shields and Simonazzi. Shields started race three at the front and kept the lead despite a bad getaway. Simonazzi climbed up to third behind Noda in second, but León had another race where he climbed up the order past both of them to end up second. His first weekend without a win and retirement in the first race meant the championship closed back up, with Leóns lead over Aron now only 18 points.

=== Second half ===
A seven-week break did not change León's one-lap pace as he took another pole position at the Red Bull Ring. Four drivers stalled at the start of race one, allowing Shields into second place and NV Racing's Gold Cup driver Vladimír Netušil into third, but the latter soon dropped back down again. CryptoTower's debutant Joshua Dufek claimed third place and held on to it until the end. Aron was on reverse grid pole position for race two, while León started sixth. The latter got stuck behind Dufek in fourth, but eventually got by. Simonazzi then attacked Aron and spun him around, before León got past both CryptoTower's Charlie Wurz and the Italian into the lead to take the win. Shields took the lead of race three after poor getaways for both front-row starters as León started another climb up the order. This time, he only got into second, leaving Shields with the win and second place in the standings, albeit now 60 points behind the Mexican. Dufek took another podium in third.

León took his fifth pole position in a row at Monza. Torrential rain necessitated a safety car start to race one. Aquaplaning occurred when the caution was withdrawn, causing another safety car and finally an early end to the race after seven laps. León therefore won, ahead of Dufek and Wurz. Shields started race two from pole position. A battle between him and Wurz ensued that lasted until León and Aron collided after catching up to the fight. A safety car later, another three-way battle for the lead was won by Wurz, who claimed the win ahead of Dufek, while Shields sustained damage and had to give up third to Motopark's debutant Levente Révész. Race three saw similarly turbulent battles all throughout the field. Dufek came out on top, only 0.046 seconds ahead of León, and the last podium place was similarly close, with Révész pipping Simonazzi by 0.034 seconds. Shields had to retire his car, therefore outwheighing Leóns retirement the race before, so the standings gap grew again to 85 points.

Wurz was the one to bring Leóns pole position streak to an end at Mugello. León started race one third and went straight past Dufek into second. Wurz then crashed out on lap three and Simonazzi took the lead at the restart. He held it until he made a mistake on lap 12 and had to give it away to León. The latter managed his gap until the end to take his seventh victory, while Simonazzi held Dufek behind. Révész had reverse grid pole position and initially held on to the lead, until Shields took it on lap three. The Brit did not look back after that and took his fourth win of the season, while the Hungarian tried to stop his slip down the order. This did not work, however, as he had to give up the podium places to Dufek and León. This was Leóns fifteenth podium in only twenty races. Shields' race two win could not keep the championship tight enough to leave it open going into the final race. 101 points in the lead, León took the title.

Trulli returned to the championship for the final round at Barcelona, and took pole position straight away. Trulli started race one cleanly while behind him all other positions were disputed. Once the dust had settled - and a safety car had been called for León ending his race in the gravel - Wurz overtook Trulli, but had to hand the position back, leaving the Italian to win, with Shields completing the podium. Révész overtook reverse grid polesitter Bergmeister at the start of race two and was largely unbothered for the rest of the race. Wurz tried attacking him twice, but had to be content with second place, while Shields once again came third. Race three started in similar fashion, but this time Bergmeister had to concede the lead to Simonazzi. Unlike the day before, Bergmeister was able to stay with the leader this time to finish the race in second and claim an uncontested Rookies' Championship. León bookended his campaign with another podium, with his points advantage over Shields at 87 points at the end of the season.

Only three drivers contested every race of the season, with entries never surpassing ten cars at any moment. Most races were being contested by a single-digit number of cars due to regular non-starters and withdrawals. León was a deserved and largely uncontested champion, while the drivers closest to his form did not contest the full season. The ever strong Formula Regional European Championship and the newly founded Eurocup-3 drew interest away from the series, and its future became more and more unclear. Away from the track, further drama did not help the popularity of the championship, after it became apparent that a special rule benefitting female drivers had been introduced. Noda, the only women competing, withdrew her entry after this rule was dropped.

== Championship standings ==
=== Drivers' Championship ===
Points were awarded as follows:

Position	1st	2nd	3rd	4th	5th	6th	7th	8th	9th	10th	Pole	FL	PG
Points	25	18	15	12	10	8	6	4	2	1	**1**	1	2*

Each drivers' three worst scores were dropped.

Pos	Driver	PRT (Portugal)			SPA (Belgium)			HUN (Hungary)			LEC (France)			RBR (Austria)			MNZ (Italy)			MUG (Italy)		CAT (Spain)			Pts
Pos	Driver	R1	R2	R3	R1	R2	R3	R1	R2	R3	R1	R2	R3	R1	R2	R3	R1	R2	R3	R1	R2	R1	R2	R3	Pts
1	(Mexico) Noel León	3*	5	1	**1**	2*	3	**1**	4	3*	**Ret**	7	2*	**1**	1*	2*	**1**	Ret	2	1*	3*	Ret	4	3	394
2	(United Kingdom) Cian Shields	6	9	5	2	4	1*	2	8	6	4	2	1	2	5	1	6	4†	Ret	4	1	3	3	6	307
3	(Italy) Francesco Simonazzi	4	1	3	5	3	2	4	5	5	Ret	3*	5	4*	2	5	4*	5	4	2	5	4	5	1	289
4	(United States) Bryce Aron	5	4	4	3*	1	5	6	1	4	3	1	4	6	6	6	7	Ret	5	5	8	WD	WD	WD	238
5	(Germany) Jakob Bergmeister	DNS	6	6	7	6	Ret	8	7	2	2*	5	6	7	7	7						6	7	2	148
6	(Austria) Charlie Wurz													5	3	4	3	1*	Ret	**Ret**	6	2	2*	5	139
7	(Switzerland) Joshua Dufek													3	4	3	2	2	1*	3	2				138
8	(Japan) Juju Noda	7	7	7	6	7	6	5	3	9	1	4	3	WD	WD	WD									118
9	(Hungary) Levente Révész																5	3	3	6	4	5*	1	7	103
10	(Italy) Enzo Trulli	**1**	2*	8																		**1**	6	4*	98
11	(United Kingdom) Josh Mason				4	5	4	3*	2*	1															96
12	(Germany) Tim Tramnitz	2	3	2*																					55
13	(Czech Republic) Vladimír Netušil	DNS	8	10	10	10	7	9	9	8				9	8	9	WD	WD	WD			Ret	DNS	DNS	29
14	(Serbia) Paolo Brajnik	Ret	DNS	9	9	9	Ret	Ret	DNS	DNS				8	Ret	8				7	7				26
15	Vladislav Ryabov										5	6	7												24
16	(Hungary) Benjámin Berta							7	6	7															20
17	(Hungary) Attila Pénzes										6	8	8												16
18	(Hong Kong) Gerrard Xie				8	8	Ret																		8
Pos	Driver	R1	R2	R3	R1	R2	R3	R1	R2	R3	R1	R2	R3	R1	R2	R3	R1	R2	R3	R1	R2	R1	R2	R3	Pts
Pos	Driver	PRT (Portugal)			SPA (Belgium)			HUN (Hungary)			LEC (France)			RBR (Austria)			MNZ (Italy)			MUG (Italy)		CAT (Spain)			Pts

Colour	Result
Gold	Winner
Silver	Second place
Bronze	Third place
Green	Points classification
Blue	Non-points classification
Blue	Non-classified finish (NC)
Purple	Retired, not classified (Ret)
Red	Did not qualify (DNQ)
Red	Did not pre-qualify (DNPQ)
Black	Disqualified (DSQ)
White	Did not start (DNS)
White	Withdrew (WD)
White	Race cancelled (C)
Blank	Did not practice (DNP)
Blank	Did not arrive (DNA)
Blank	Excluded (EX)

**Bold** – Pole position

Italics – Fastest lap

† – Did not finish, but classified

* – Most positions gained

=== Rookies' Championship ===
Points were awarded as follows:

1	2	3	4	5
10	8	6	4	3

Each drivers' three worst results were dropped.

Pos	Driver	PRT (Portugal)			SPA (Belgium)			HUN (Hungary)			LEC (France)			RBR (Austria)			MNZ (Italy)			MUG (Italy)		CAT (Spain)			Pts
Pos	Driver	R1	R2	R3	R1	R2	R3	R1	R2	R3	R1	R2	R3	R1	R2	R3	R1	R2	R3	R1	R2	R1	R2	R3	Pts
1	(Germany) Jakob Bergmeister	DNS	6	6	7	6	Ret	8	7	2	2	5	6	7	7	7						6	7	2	150
2	(Japan) Juju Noda	7	7	7	6	7	6	5	3	9	1	4	3	WD	WD	WD									110
3	Vladislav Ryabov										5	6	7												18
4	(Hong Kong) Gerrard Xie				8	8	Ret																		12
Pos	Driver	R1	R2	R3	R1	R2	R3	R1	R2	R3	R1	R2	R3	R1	R2	R3	R1	R2	R3	R1	R2	R1	R2	R3	Pts
Pos	Driver	PRT (Portugal)			SPA (Belgium)			HUN (Hungary)			LEC (France)			RBR (Austria)			MNZ (Italy)			MUG (Italy)		CAT (Spain)			Pts

=== Teams' Championship ===
Points were awarded as follows, with each team counting their best two results:

1	2	3	4	5
10	8	6	4	3

Pos	Driver	PRT (Portugal)			SPA (Belgium)			HUN (Hungary)			LEC (France)			RBR (Austria)			MNZ (Italy)			MUG (Italy)		CAT (Spain)			Pts
Pos	Driver	R1	R2	R3	R1	R2	R3	R1	R2	R3	R1	R2	R3	R1	R2	R3	R1	R2	R3	R1	R2	R1	R2	R3	Pts
1	(Germany) Team Motopark	3	4	1	1	1	1	1	1	2	2	1	1	1	1	1	1	3	2	1	1	3	1	2	325
1	(Germany) Team Motopark	5	5	4	2	2	3	2	4	3	3	2	2	2	5	2	5	4†	3	4	3	5	3	3	325
2	(Japan) CryptoTower Racing Team	1	2	2	4	5	4	3	2	1	5	6	7	3	3	3	2	1	1	3	2	1	2	4	201
2	(Japan) CryptoTower Racing Team	2	3	8	8	8	Ret	7	6	7	6	8	8	5	4	4	3	2	Ret	Ret	6	1	2	5	201
3	(Italy) BVM Racing	4	1	3	5	3	2	4	5	5	Ret	3	5	4	2	5	4	5	4	2	5	4	5	1	110
4	(Japan) Noda Racing	7	7	7	6	7	6	5	3	9	1	4	3	WD	WD	WD									29
5	(Czech Republic) Effective Racing	DNS	8	10	10	10	7	9	9	8				9	8	9	WD	WD	WD			7	DNS	DNS	0
6	(Serbia) NV Racing	Ret	DNS	9	9	9	Ret	Ret	DNS	DNS				8	Ret	8				7	7				0
Pos	Driver	R1	R2	R3	R1	R2	R3	R1	R2	R3	R1	R2	R3	R1	R2	R3	R1	R2	R3	R1	R2	R1	R2	R3	Pts
Pos	Driver	PRT (Portugal)			SPA (Belgium)			HUN (Hungary)			LEC (France)			RBR (Austria)			MNZ (Italy)			MUG (Italy)		CAT (Spain)			Pts
