= Nico Christodoulou =

Canadian racing driver (born 2005)

- Nationality: (Canada) Canadian
- Born: Nicholas Christodoulou; 16 February 2005 (age 21) King City, Ontario, Canada

GB3 Championship career
- Debut season: 2022
- Current team: Arden Motorsport
- Car number: 22
- Starts: 21 (21 entries)
- Wins: 0
- Podiums: 0
- Poles: 0
- Fastest laps: 0
- Best finish: 16th in 2022

Previous series
- 2022 2021, 2020 2020 2019-20, 2018-19 2018 2018: FR Americas; F4 United States; U.S. F2000; F4 NACAM; F2000 Championship Series; Atlantic Championship Series

Nicholas "Nico" Christodoulou (born 16 February 2005), is a Canadian racing driver currently competing in the USF2000 Championship, driving for Velocity Racing Development. He competed in the first two rounds of the 2022 Formula Regional Americas Championship with Velocity Racing Development (VRD), and made his debut in the GB3 Championship later in the year as a result of the collaboration between VRD and Arden Motorsport.

== Career ==
=== Karting ===
In 2019, Christodoulou competed in the Junior ROK category of the Florida Winter Tour with Goodwood Kartways, where he came 37th with 355 points.

=== NACAM Formula 4 ===
Christodoulou competed in the NACAM Formula 4 Championship in the 2018-19 season with FyF Racing, and continued in the championship in the 2019-20 season, with Scuderia Martiga EG. He was fourth in the 2018-19 standings, and second in the 2019-20 standings, with three wins.

=== U.S. F2000 National Championship ===
Christodoulou competed in the Road America round and the New Jersey Motorsports Park round of the 2020 U.S. F2000 National Championship with DEForce Racing.

=== Formula 4 United States Championship ===
Christodoulou raced in the 2020 Formula 4 United States Championship with DEForce Racing, where he came seventh in the overall championship standings. He switched to Velocity Racing Development for 2022, where he finished fourth in the standings with two wins.

=== Formula Regional Americas Championship ===
Christodoulou continued with Velocity Racing Development into 2022, where he competed in the 2022 Formula Regional Americas Championship. However, he withdrew from the championship after the second round.

=== GB3 Championship ===
Following the collaboration announcement between Velocity Racing Development and Arden Motorsport, Christodoulou joined Arden in the 2022 GB3 Championship from Round 3.

== Racing record ==
=== Karting career summary ===
Season	Series	Team	Points	Position
2019	Florida Winter Tour - Junior ROK	Goodwood Kartways	355	37th

=== Racing career summary ===
Season	Series	Team	Races	Wins	Poles	F/Laps	Podiums	Points	Position
2018	Atlantic Championship Series	?	2	0	0	0	0	0	NC†
2018	F2000 Championship Series	?	6	0	0	0	0	0	NC†
2018-19	NACAM Formula 4 Championship	JLBernal Racing	5	0	0	0	0	243	4th
2018-19	NACAM Formula 4 Championship	Scuderia Martiga EG	15	0	0	1	11	243	4th
2019-20	NACAM Formula 4 Championship	Scuderia Martiga EG	20	3	1	6	11	280	**2nd**
2020	U.S. F2000 National Championship	DEForce Racing	5	0	0	0	0	34	21st
2020	Formula 4 United States Championship	DEForce Racing	18	0	0	1	1	82	7th
2021	Formula 4 United States Championship	Velocity Racing Development	16	3	1	4	10	174.5	4th
2022	Formula Regional Americas Championship	Velocity Racing Development	6	0	0	0	0	44	9th
2022	GB3 Championship	Arden Motorsport	18	0	0	2	0	163	16th
2023	GB3 Championship	Arden VRD	23	0	0	1	3	261	8th
2023	USF2000 Championship	Velocity Racing Development	2	1	0	1	1	48	21st
2024	USF2000 Championship	Velocity Racing Development	7	1	0	1	1	92	19th
2024	USF Pro 2000 Championship	Velocity Racing Development	5	0	0	0	0	48	23rd

^{†} As Christodoulou was a guest driver, he was ineligible for championship points.
* Season still in progress.

=== Complete GB3 Championship results ===
(key) (Races in bold indicate pole position) (Races in italics indicate fastest lap)

Year	Team	1	2	3	4	5	6	7	8	9	10	11	12	13	14	15	16	17	18	19	20	21	22	23	24	DC	Points
2022	Arden Motorsport	OUL; 1	OUL; 2	OUL; 3	SIL1; 1	SIL1; 2	SIL1; 3	DON1; 1 Ret	DON1; 2; 11	DON1; 3; 15	SNE; 1; 13	SNE; 2; 8	SNE; 3; 10^{3}	SPA; 1 Ret	SPA; 2; 15	SPA; 3; 10	SIL2; 1; 7	SIL2; 2; 7	SIL2; 3; 18	BRH; 1; 5	BRH; 2; 10	BRH; 3; 11^{2}	DON2; 1; 9	DON2; 2; 7	DON2; 3; 4^{4}	16th	163
2023	Arden VRD	OUL; 1; 11	OUL; 2; 10	OUL; 3; 18	SIL1; 1 Ret	SIL1; 2; 15	SIL1; 3; 2^{7}	SPA; 1; 12	SPA; 2; 8	SPA; 3; 16^{3}	SNE; 1 Ret	SNE; 2; 9	SNE; 3; 8^{9}	SIL2; 1; 7	SIL2; 2; 8	SIL2; 3 C	BRH; 1; 13	BRH; 2; 13	BRH; 3; 2^{5}	ZAN; 1; 4	ZAN; 2; 3	ZAN; 3; 19^{3}	DON; 1; 8	DON; 2; 12	DON; 3; 4^{7}	8th	261

* Season still in progress.

=== American open-wheel racing results ===
==== USF2000 Championship ====
(key) (Races in bold indicate pole position) (Races in italics indicate fastest lap) (Races with * indicate most race laps led)

Year	Team	1	2	3	4	5	6	7	8	9	10	11	12	13	14	15	16	17	18	Rank	Points
2020	DEForce Racing	ROA; 1; 17	ROA; 2; 11	MOH; 1	MOH; 2	MOH; 3	LOR	IMS; 1	IMS; 2	IMS; 3	MOH; 4	MOH; 5	MOH; 6	NJMP; 1; 12	NJMP; 2; 16	NJMP; 3; 15	STP; 1	STP; 2		21st	34
2023	Velocity Racing Development	STP; 1	STP; 2	SEB; 1	SEB; 2	IMS; 1	IMS; 2	IMS; 3	IRP	ROA; 1	ROA; 2	MOH; 1	MOH; 2	MOH; 3	TOR; 1; 5	TOR; 2; 1	POR; 1	POR; 2	POR; 3	21st	48
2024	Velocity Racing Development	STP; 1; 6	STP; 2; 5	NOL; 1; 16	NOL; 2; 7	NOL; 3; 1*	IMS; 1; 19	IMS; 2; 16	IRP	ROA; 1	ROA; 2	MOH; 1	MOH; 2	MOH; 3	TOR; 1	TOR; 2	POR; 1	POR; 2	POR; 3	19th	92

==== USF Pro 2000 Championship ====
(key) (Races in bold indicate pole position) (Races in italics indicate fastest lap) (Races with * indicate most race laps led)

Year	Team	1	2	3	4	5	6	7	8	9	10	11	12	13	14	15	16	17	18	Rank	Points
2024	Velocity Racing Development	STP; 1	STP; 2	LOU; 1	LOU; 2	LOU; 3	IMS; 1	IMS; 2	IMS; 3	IRP	ROA; 1; 21	ROA; 2; 14	ROA; 3; 7	MOH; 1; 10	MOH; 2; 6	TOR; 1	TOR; 2	POR; 1	POR; 2	23rd	48

*Season still in progress.
