= 2019–20 NACAM Formula 4 Championship =

Auto racing series

Seasons
- ← 2018–19 ~~2021~~; 2022 →

The 2019–20 NACAM Formula 4 Championship season was the fifth season of the NACAM Formula 4 Championship. It began on 25 October 2019 at the Autódromo Hermanos Rodríguez in Mexico City and ended on 18 October 2020 at Autódromo de Monterrey after seven rounds.

== Teams and drivers ==
Team	No.	Driver	Rounds
(Mexico) Telcel RPL Racing	2	(Mexico) Andrés Pérez de Lara	All
(Mexico) Telcel RPL Racing	12	(Mexico) Pablo Pérez de Lara	1–5
(Mexico) Telcel RPL Racing	20	(Mexico) Emiliano Richards	1–2
(Mexico) Telcel RPL Racing	24	(Canada) Thomas Nepveu	6–7
(Mexico) Telcel RPL Racing	99	(Mexico) José Garfias	All
(Mexico) Sidral AGA-Checo Pérez	3	(Mexico) Jorge Garcíarce	2–7
(Mexico) Sidral AGA-Checo Pérez	33	(Mexico) Jesse Carrasquedo Jr.	4–6
(Mexico) Scuderia Martiga EG	5	(United States) Kory Enders	1
(Mexico) Scuderia Martiga EG	7	(United States) Reece Gold	3
(Mexico) Scuderia Martiga EG	17	(Mexico) José Andrés Martínez	7
(Mexico) Scuderia Martiga EG	22	(Canada) Nicholas Christodoulou	All
(Mexico) Scuderia Martiga EG	68	(United States) Nolan Siegel	2–4
(Mexico) Scuderia Martiga EG	91	(Brazil) Eduardo Barrichello	1
(Mexico) Ram Racing	8	(Mexico) Chara Mansur	1–4, 6–7
(Mexico) Ram Racing	16	(Mexico) Alejandro Berumen	5–7
(Mexico) Ram Racing	19	(Mexico) Noel León	All
(Mexico) Ram Racing	31	(Mexico) Álex García	1–3
(Mexico) Easy-Shop.com Racing	9	(Mexico) Daniel Forcadell	1, 3
(Mexico) Rand Team by Tiger	10	(Mexico) Eloy Sebastián López	1–2
(Mexico) Air Bit	28	(Mexico) Álex Servín	1–3
(Mexico) MEA Racing	42	(Mexico) Gil Molina	5–7
(Mexico) FF&R IBC Group	53	(Mexico) Mariano Martínez	1
(Mexico) FF&R IBC Group	53	(Mexico) Álex Servín	4
(Mexico) FF&R IBC Group	66	(Mexico) Daniel Escoto	All
(United States) Euromotor Sport	77	(United States) David Morales	All
TBA	6	(Italy) Giorgio Dissegna	4

== Race calendar ==
All rounds were held in Mexico. The first round was held in support of the 2019 Mexican Grand Prix. Following the fourth round, the remainder of the season was altered due to the 2019-20 coronavirus pandemic. On 17 August 2020 it was announced that the fifth round scheduled at Parque Tangamanga was moved to Autódromo de Querétaro, which also hosted the sixth round. On 9 October 2020 the series announced a new date for the season finale.

Round		Circuit	Date	Pole position	Fastest lap	Winning driver	Winning team
2019
1	R1	Autódromo Hermanos Rodríguez (Mexico City)	26 October	(Mexico) Noel León	(Mexico) José Garfias	(Canada) Nicholas Christodoulou	(Mexico) Scuderia Martiga EG
1	R2	Autódromo Hermanos Rodríguez (Mexico City)	27 October		(Mexico) Noel León	(Mexico) Noel León	(Mexico) Ram Racing
2	R1	Autódromo Internacional de Aguascalientes (Aguascalientes, Aguascalientes)	14 December	(Mexico) Andrés Pérez de Lara	(Mexico) Pablo Pérez de Lara	(Mexico) Andrés Pérez de Lara	(Mexico) Telcel RPL Racing
2	R2	Autódromo Internacional de Aguascalientes (Aguascalientes, Aguascalientes)	15 December		(Mexico) José Garfias	(Mexico) Andrés Pérez de Lara	(Mexico) Telcel RPL Racing
2	R3	Autódromo Internacional de Aguascalientes (Aguascalientes, Aguascalientes)	15 December	(Mexico) Pablo Pérez de Lara	(Canada) Nicholas Christodoulou	(Mexico) Noel León	(Mexico) Ram Racing
2020
3	R1	Autódromo Miguel E. Abed (Amozoc, Puebla)	25 January	(Canada) Nicholas Christodoulou	(Canada) Nicholas Christodoulou	(Canada) Nicholas Christodoulou	(Mexico) Scuderia Martiga EG
3	R2	Autódromo Miguel E. Abed (Amozoc, Puebla)	26 January		(Canada) Nicholas Christodoulou	(Mexico) José Garfias	(Mexico) Telcel RPL Racing
3	R3	Autódromo Miguel E. Abed (Amozoc, Puebla)	26 January	(Mexico) Noel León	(Canada) Nicholas Christodoulou	(Mexico) Noel León	(Mexico) Ram Racing
4	R1	Autódromo Emerson Fittipaldi (Mérida, Yucatán)	29 February	(Mexico) Noel León	(Mexico) Noel León	(Mexico) Noel León	(Mexico) Ram Racing
4	R2	Autódromo Emerson Fittipaldi (Mérida, Yucatán)	1 March		(Mexico) Pablo Pérez de Lara	(Mexico) Andrés Pérez de Lara	(Mexico) Telcel RPL Racing
4	R3	Autódromo Emerson Fittipaldi (Mérida, Yucatán)	1 March	(Mexico) Noel León	(Canada) Nicholas Christodoulou	(Mexico) José Garfias	(Mexico) Telcel RPL Racing
5	R1	Autódromo de Querétaro (El Marqués, Quéretaro)	22 August	(Mexico) Noel León	(Mexico) Andrés Pérez de Lara	(Mexico) Andrés Pérez de Lara	(Mexico) Telcel RPL Racing
5	R2	Autódromo de Querétaro (El Marqués, Quéretaro)	23 August		(Mexico) Pablo Pérez de Lara	(Mexico) Gil Molina	(Mexico) MEA Racing
5	R3	Autódromo de Querétaro (El Marqués, Quéretaro)	23 August	(Mexico) Noel León	(Mexico) Noel León	(Mexico) Noel León	(Mexico) Ram Racing
6	R1	Autódromo de Querétaro (El Marqués, Quéretaro)	19 September	(Mexico) Noel León	(Canada) Thomas Nepveu	(Canada) Thomas Nepveu	(Mexico) Telcel RPL Racing
6	R2	Autódromo de Querétaro (El Marqués, Quéretaro)	20 September		(Canada) Thomas Nepveu	(Mexico) Jorge Garcíarce	(Mexico) Sidral AGA-Checo Pérez
6	R3	Autódromo de Querétaro (El Marqués, Quéretaro)	20 September	(Mexico) Noel León	(Mexico) Noel León	(Mexico) Noel León	(Mexico) Ram Racing
7	R1	Autódromo de Monterrey (Apodaca, Nuevo León)	31 October	(Mexico) Noel León	(Canada) Nicholas Christodoulou	(Canada) Nicholas Christodoulou	(Mexico) Scuderia Martiga EG
7	R2	Autódromo de Monterrey (Apodaca, Nuevo León)	1 November		(Mexico) Jorge Garcíarce	(Mexico) José Garfias	(Mexico) Telcel RPL Racing
7	R3	Autódromo de Monterrey (Apodaca, Nuevo León)	1 November	(Mexico) Noel León	(Mexico) Noel León	(Mexico) Noel León	(Mexico) Ram Racing

== Championship standings ==
Points were awarded to the top 10 classified finishers in each race.

Position	**1st**	**2nd**	**3rd**	**4th**	**5th**	**6th**	**7th**	**8th**	**9th**	**10th**
Points	25	18	15	12	10	8	6	4	2	1

=== Drivers' Championship ===
Pos	Driver	AHR		AGS			PUE			MER			QUE1			QUE2			MTY			Pts
Pos	Driver	R1	R2	R1	R2	R3	R1	R2	R3	R1	R2	R3	R1	R2	R3	R1	R2	R3	R1	R2	R3	Pts
1	(Mexico) Noel León	**2**	1	2	3	1	2	3	**1**	**1**	3	**Ret**	**5**	Ret	**1**	**11**	6	**1**	**2**	3	**1**	325
2	(Canada) Nicholas Christodoulou	1	2	6	4	3	**1**	4	3	2	Ret	2	4	Ret	4	4	9	2	1	2	3	280
3	(Mexico) Andrés Pérez de Lara	4	4	**1**	1	6	9	5	5	5	1	3	1	Ret	9	3	3	5	3	7	5	252
4	(Mexico) José Garfias	10	Ret	4	2	5	5	1	4	3	2	1	3	Ret	5	7	4	Ret	4	1	4	238
5	(Mexico) Pablo Pérez de Lara	Ret	8	3	7	**2**	3	7	7	4	5	4	2	Ret	2							140
6	(Mexico) Jorge Garciarce			9	10	11	13	10	13	8	7	Ret	10	NC	8	5	1	7	NC	5	2	88
7	(Mexico) Gil Molina												7	1	3	2	10	6	Ret	4	Ret	85
8	(Mexico) Daniel Escoto	6	7	7	9	12	14	11	9	7	9	7	9	5	10	10	8	8	5	NC	6	78
9	(United States) David Morales	5	13	10	11	Ret	6	12	12†	Ret	6	6	11	3	6	9	7	11	8	8	Ret	74
10	(Canada) Thomas Nepveu															1	2	3	6	Ret	Ret	66
11	(United States) Nolan Siegel			Ret	5	8	7	DSQ	2	Ret	4	5										60
12	(Mexico) Alejandro Berumen												8	2	7	6	5	9	9	6	Ret	58
13	(Mexico) Jesse Carrasquedo Jr.									Ret	10	9	6	4	11	8	12	4				39
14	(United States) Reece Gold						4	2	6													38
15	(Mexico) Álex García	8	5	Ret	8	7	8	8	11†													32
16	(Mexico) Emiliano Richards	Ret	6	Ret	6	4																28
17	(Mexico) Álex Servín	9	10	8	Ret	Ret	12	6	Ret	9	8	8										25
18	(Mexico) Chara Mansur	11	9	5	12	9	11	Ret	10	6	11†	DNS				12	11	10	DNS	DNS	DNS	24
19	(Brazil) Eduardo Barrichello	3	14																			15
20	(Mexico) Mariano Martínez	Ret	3																			15
21	(Mexico) Daniel Forcadell	7	12				10	9	8													13
22	(Mexico) José Andrés Martínez																		7	9	Ret	8
23	(Mexico) Eloy Sebastián López	12	11	Ret	13	10																1
—	(United States) Kory Enders	DNP	DNP																			—
Drivers ineligible for championship points
—	(Italy) Giorgio Dissegna									10	DNS	10										—
Pos	Driver	R1	R2	R1	R2	R3	R1	R2	R3	R1	R2	R3	R1	R2	R3	R1	R2	R3	R1	R2	R3	Pts
Pos	Driver	AHR		AGS			PUE			MER			QUE1			QUE2			MTY			Pts

Colour	Result
Gold	Winner
Silver	Second place
Bronze	Third place
Green	Points classification
Blue	Non-points classification
Blue	Non-classified finish (NC)
Purple	Retired, not classified (Ret)
Red	Did not qualify (DNQ)
Red	Did not pre-qualify (DNPQ)
Black	Disqualified (DSQ)
White	Did not start (DNS)
White	Withdrew (WD)
White	Race cancelled (C)
Blank	Did not practice (DNP)
Blank	Did not arrive (DNA)
Blank	Excluded (EX)

**Bold** – Pole
Italics – Fastest Lap
† — Did not finish, but classified
