= Jorge Garciarce =

Mexican racing driver (born 2004)

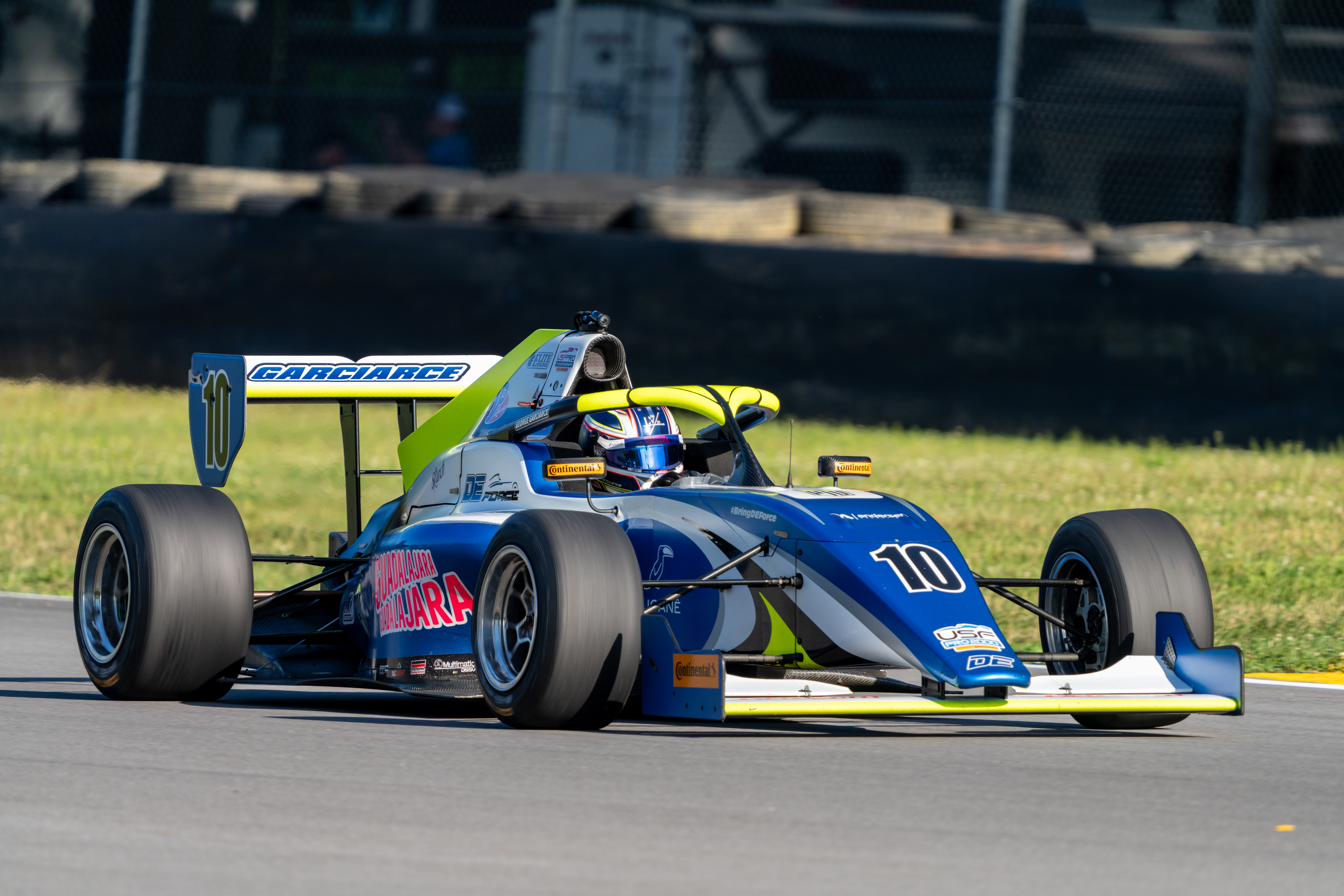
- Garciarce at the Mid-Ohio Sports Car Course in 2024
- Nationality: (Mexico) Mexican
- Born: Jorge Garciarce Dávila; 29 December 2004 (age 21) Guadalajara, Mexico

USF Pro 2000 Championship career
- Debut season: 2024
- Current team: DEForce Racing
- Car number: 10
- Starts: 0
- Wins: 0
- Podiums: 0
- Poles: 0
- Fastest laps: 0
- Best finish: TBD in 2024

Previous series
- 2022-23 2021 2021 2021: USF2000 Championship; Italian Formula 4 Championship; ADAC Formula 4 F4 Spanish Championship

Jorge Garciarce Dávila (born 29 December 2004), also known as George Garciarce, is a Mexican racing driver. He last competed in the 2025 USF Pro 2000 Championship driving for DEForce Racing. Garciarce previously competed in the USF2000 Championship with DEForce Racing in 2023.

== Career ==
Garciarce is the 2022 Gran Turismo Mexico champion. He previously competed in the Italian Formula 4 Championship with Jenzer Motorsport in 2021.

== Racing record ==
=== Racing career summary ===
Season	Series	Team	Races	Wins	Poles	F/Laps	Podiums	Points	Position
2019–20	NACAM Formula 4 Championship	Sidral AGA-Checo Pérez	18	1	0	1	2	88	6th
2020	SC Súper Copa Mercedes Benz	Sidral Aga Racing Team	10	1	3	0	3	945	9th
2021	F4 Spanish Championship	Jenzer Motorsport	3	0	0	0	0	0	28th
2021	ADAC Formula 4 Championship	Jenzer Motorsport	6	0	0	0	0	0	NC†
2021	Italian F4 Championship	Jenzer Motorsport	21	0	0	0	0	1	34th
2022	SC Súper Copa Mercedes Benz	Sidral Aga Racing Team	16	6	7	0	10	1353	**1st**
2022	USF2000 Championship	Jay Howard Driver Development	18	0	0	0	0	142	13th
2023	USF2000 Championship	DEForce Racing	18	0	0	0	0	212	8th
2023	USF Pro 2000 Championship	DEForce Racing	2	0	0	0	0	17	27th
2024	USF Pro 2000 Championship	DEForce Racing	18	0	0	0	0	199	10th
2025	USF Pro 2000 Championship	DEForce Racing	17	0	0	0	0	148	14th
2025	Eurocup-3	Drivex	6	0	0	0	0	0	27th

† As Garciarce was a guest driver, he was ineligible for points.

* Season still in progress.

=== Complete NACAM Formula 4 Championship results ===
(key) (Races in bold indicate pole position) (Races in italics indicate fastest lap)

Year	Team	1	2	3	4	5	6	7	8	9	10	11	12	13	14	15	16	17	18	19	20	Pos	Points
2019-20	Sidral AGA-Checo Pérez	AHR; 1	AHR; 2	AGS; 1; 9	AGS; 2; 10	AGS; 3; 11	PUE; 1; 13	PUE; 2; 10	PUE; 3; 13	MER; 1; 8	MER; 2; 7	MER; 3 Ret	QUE1; 1; 10	QUE1; 2 NC	QUE1; 3; 8	QUE2; 1; 5	QUE2; 2; 1	QUE2; 3; 7	MTY; 1 NC	MTY; 2; 5	MTY; 3; 2	6th	88

=== Complete Italian F4 Championship results ===
(key) (Races in bold indicate pole position) (Races in italics indicate fastest lap)

Year	Team	1	2	3	4	5	6	7	8	9	10	11	12	13	14	15	16	17	18	19	20	21	Pos	Points
2021	Jenzer Motorsport	LEC; 1; 32	LEC; 2; 29†	LEC; 3; 28	MIS; 1; 25	MIS; 2; 23	MIS; 3; 23	VLL; 1; 25	VLL; 2 Ret	VLL; 3; 18	IMO; 1; 10	IMO; 2; 15	IMO; 3; 22	RBR; 1; 27	RBR; 2 Ret	RBR; 3; 24	MUG; 1; 25	MUG; 2; 23	MUG; 3; 23	MNZ; 1; 13	MNZ; 2; 25	MNZ; 3; 21	34th	1

=== Complete F4 Spanish Championship results ===
(key) (Races in bold indicate pole position) (Races in italics indicate fastest lap)

Year	Team	1	2	3	4	5	6	7	8	9	10	11	12	13	14	15	16	17	18	19	20	21	Pos	Points
2021	Jenzer Motorsport	SPA; 1; 22	SPA; 2; 14	SPA; 3; 15	NAV; 1	NAV; 2	NAV; 3	ALG; 1	ALG; 2	ALG; 3	ARA; 1	ARA; 2	ARA; 3	CRT; 1	CRT; 2	CRT; 3	JER; 1	JER; 2	JER; 3	CAT; 1	CAT; 2	CAT; 3	28th	0

=== Complete ADAC Formula 4 Championship results ===
(key) (Races in bold indicate pole position) (Races in italics indicate fastest lap)

Year	Team	1	2	3	4	5	6	7	8	9	10	11	12	13	14	15	16	17	18	Pos	Points
2021	Jenzer Motorsport	RBR; 1; 19	RBR; 2; 18	RBR; 3; 10	ZAN; 1; 17	ZAN; 2; 18	ZAN; 3 Ret	HOC1; 1	HOC1; 2	HOC1; 3	SAC; 1	SAC; 2	SAC; 3	HOC2; 1	HOC2; 2	HOC2; 3	NÜR; 1	NÜR; 2	NÜR; 3	NC	–

† As Garciarce was a guest driver, he was ineligible for points

=== Complete Eurocup-3 results ===
(key) (Races in bold indicate pole position) (Races in italics indicate fastest lap)

Year	Team	1	2	3	4	5	6	7	8	9	10	11	12	13	14	15	16	17	18	DC	Points
2025	Drivex	RBR; 1	RBR; 2	POR; 1	POR; SR	POR; 2	LEC; 1	LEC; SR	LEC; 2	MNZ; 1	MNZ; 2	ASS; 1	ASS; 2	SPA; 1; 16	SPA; 2; 16	JER; 1; 17	JER; 2; 14	CAT; 1; 13	CAT; 2; 18	27th	0

=== American open-wheel racing results ===
==== USF2000 Championship ====
(key) (Races in bold indicate pole position) (Races in italics indicate fastest lap) (Races with * indicate most race laps led)

Year	Team	1	2	3	4	5	6	7	8	9	10	11	12	13	14	15	16	17	18	Rank	Points
2022	Jay Howard Driver Development	STP; 1; 19	STP; 2; 11	ALA; 1; 14	ALA; 2; 12	IMS; 1; 7	IMS; 2; 15	IMS; 3; 19	IRP; 15	ROA; 1; 15	ROA; 2; 16	MOH; 1; 17	MOH; 2; 14	MOH; 3; 19	TOR; 1; 14	TOR; 2; 8	POR; 1; 9	POR; 2; 10	POR; 3; 6	13th	142
2023	DEForce Racing	STP; 1; 13	STP; 2; 5	SEB; 1; 9	SEB; 2; 6	IMS; 1; 6	IMS; 2; 10	IMS; 3; 14	IRP; 10	ROA; 1; 9	ROA; 2; 4	MOH; 1; 8	MOH; 2; 8	MOH; 3; 20	TOR; 1; 14	TOR; 2; 4	POR; 1; 17	POR; 2; 6	POR; 3; 14	8th	212

==== USF Pro 2000 Championship ====
(key) (Races in bold indicate pole position) (Races in italics indicate fastest lap) (Races with * indicate most race laps led)

Year	Team	1	2	3	4	5	6	7	8	9	10	11	12	13	14	15	16	17	18	Rank	Points
2023	DEForce Racing	STP; 1	STP; 2	SEB; 1	SEB; 2	IMS; 1	IMS; 2	IRP	ROA; 1	ROA; 2	MOH; 1	MOH; 2	TOR; 1	TOR; 2	COTA; 1; 11	COTA; 1; 14	POR; 1	POR; 2	POR; 3	27th	17
2024	DEForce Racing	STP; 1; 11	STP; 2; 10	LOU; 1; 13	LOU; 2; 9	LOU; 3; 14	IMS; 1; 10	IMS; 2; 16	IMS; 3; 12	IRP; 10	ROA; 1; 9	ROA; 2; 7	ROA; 3; 10	MOH; 1; 8	MOH; 2; 15	TOR; 1; 7	TOR; 2; 5	POR; 1; 13	POR; 2; 7	10th	199
2025	DEForce Racing	STP; 1; 12	STP; 2; 9	LOU; 1; 14	LOU; 2; 9	LOU; 3; 13	IMS; 1; 21	IMS; 2; 12	IMS; 3; 18	IRP; 17	ROA; 1; 11	ROA; 2; 13	ROA; 3; 7	MOH; 1; 18	MOH; 2 DNS	TOR; 1; 6	TOR; 2; 12	POR; 1; 15	POR; 2; 7	14th	148
