= Alex García (racing driver, born 2003) =

Mexican racing driver (born 2003)

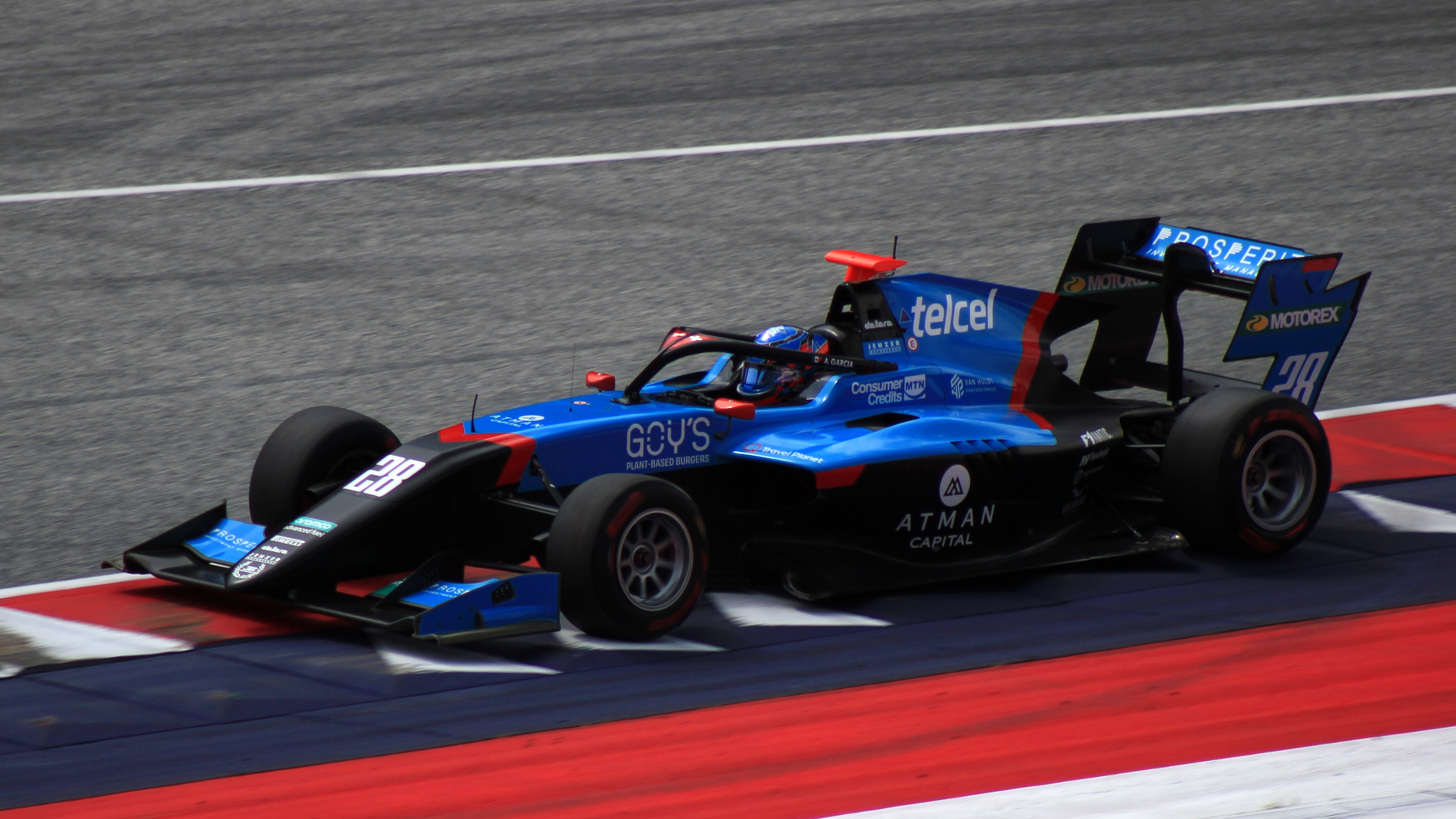
- García driving the Dallara F3 2019 during the 2023 Spielberg Formula 3 round.
- Nationality: (Mexico) Mexican
- Born: 17 July 2003 (age 23) Mexico City, Mexico

ELMS career
- Debut season: 2023
- Current team: Cool Racing
- Categorisation: FIA Silver
- Car number: 47
- Starts: 8 (8 entries)
- Wins: 3
- Podiums: 6
- Poles: 1
- Fastest laps: 0
- Best finish: 1st in 2023 (LMP3)

Previous series
- 2023 2022 2020–21 2021 2019 2019 2018–19: FIA Formula 3 Championship; Euroformula Open Championship; F4 Spanish Championship; Super Touring 2 Light Mexico; Fórmula México; Fast Racing Series Mexico; NACAM Formula 4 Championship

Alejandro García González (born 17 July 2003) is a Mexican racing driver who last competed in the LMP2 category of the 2024 European Le Mans Series for Cool Racing. He was the 2023 ELMS champion in the LMP3 category. García previously competed in the FIA Formula 3 for Jenzer Motorsport.

García was a member of A14 Management, overseen by two-time Formula One world champion Fernando Alonso.

== Early career ==
=== Karting ===
García competed in karting over 2018 and 2019, and finished second in the FIA Mexico National Karting Championship in 2018.

=== Formula 4 ===
García made his racing debut in the 2018-19 NACAM Formula 4 Championship, where he finished fifth in the overall standings.

In 2020, García competed in the F4 Spanish Championship with Global Racing Service, where he came 22nd in the standings. He switched to Campos Racing for the 2021 season, where he finished 24th.

=== Euroformula Open ===
The following year, García competed in the Euroformula Open Championship with Team Motopark. He scored a podium at Monza and ended up seventh in the standings, behind his teammates Oliver Goethe and Frederick Lubin.

=== FIA Formula 3 ===
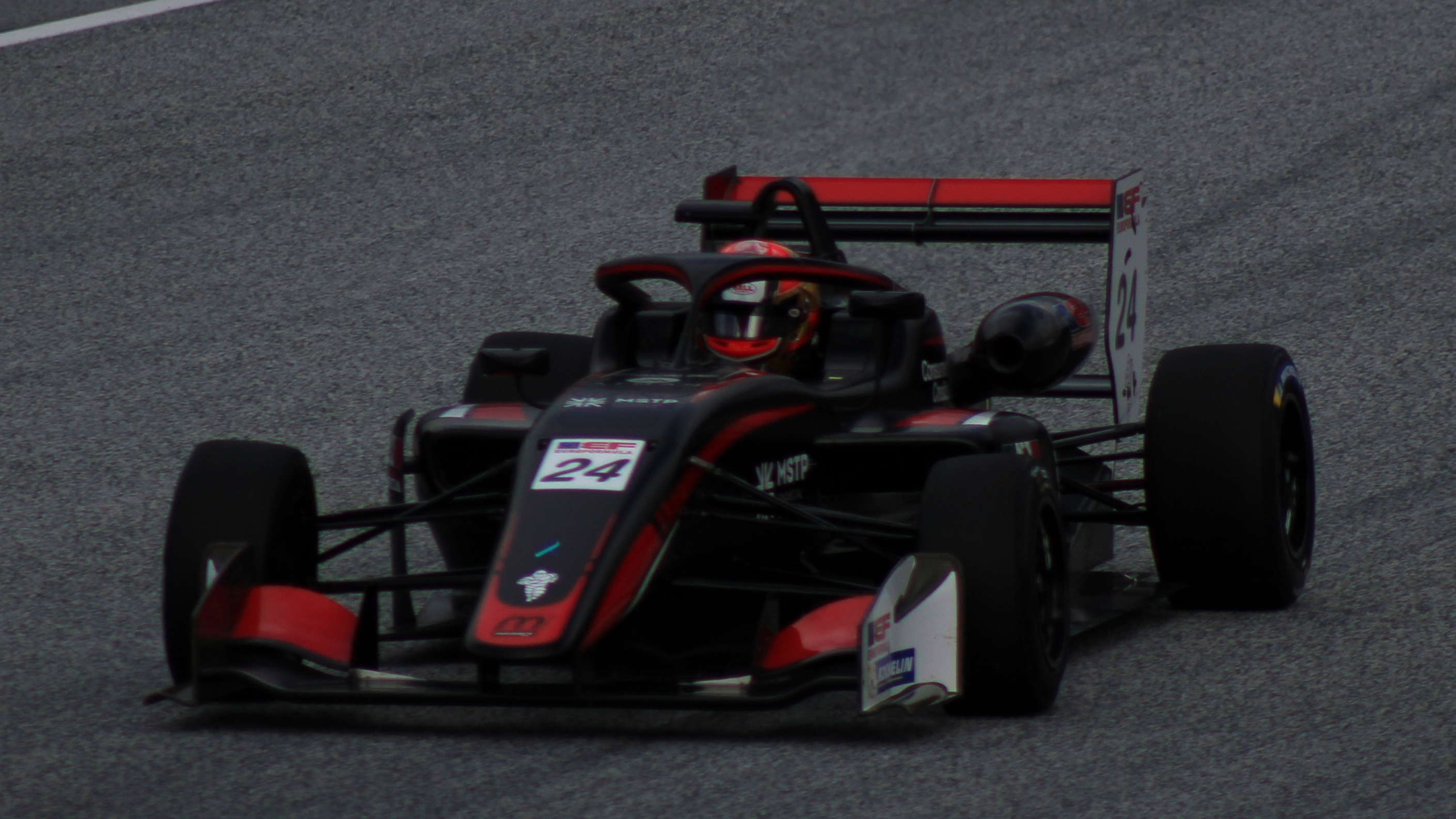
García racing in the 2022 Euroformula Open at the Red Bull Ring.

García drove for Jenzer Motorsport in the three-day post-season test of the 2022 FIA Formula 3 Championship, teaming up with fellow rookies Nikita Bedrin and Taylor Barnard. On 27 January 2023, he was signed by the Swiss team for the 2023 season. García spent most of the season fighting outside the top-20, although in the Silverstone sprint race a late charge by him on slick tyres at a damp track saw him charge to 11th. His only points came in the Spa-Francorchamps feature race where a right gamble to remain on wet tyres saw him jump all the way to fourth place, as Barnard won and Bedrin made the podium. This put García 20th in the standings with 12 points.

== Sportscar career ==
=== 2023 ===
Along with his FIA Formula 3 campaign, García competed in the 2023 European Le Mans Series with Cool Racing in the LMP3 category, alongside Adrien Chila and Marcos Siebert. He started the year strongly, with a victory at the opening in Circuit de Barcelona-Catalunya. Further wins at MotorLand Aragón and Spa-Francorchamps saw them clinch the title.

=== 2024 ===
García participated in the 2023–24 Asian Le Mans Series with Nielsen Racing during the 2024 pre-season.

For his 2024 campaign, García left FIA Formula 3 and moved to endurance racing full-time, joining Isotta Fraschini in the FIA World Endurance Championship in the Hypercar category. He was however dropped before the start of the season and replaced with Carl Bennett.

That year, García also returned to the European Le Mans Series, remaining with Cool Racing but moved up to the LMP2 category. Following two races, the latter of which García and his teammates scored a podium in, the Mexican was once again replaced by Bennett.

== Karting record ==
=== Karting career summary ===
Season	Series	Team	Position
2018	SKUSA SuperNationals XXII - X30 Junior	HR Motorsports	47th
2018	FIA México National Karting Championship		2nd
2019	SKUSA SuperNationals XXIII - X30 Senior		?

== Racing record ==
=== Racing career summary ===
Season	Series	Team	Races	Wins	Poles	F/Laps	Podiums	Points	Position
2018–19	NACAM Formula 4 Championship	Ram Racing	20	0	0	0	3	169	5th
2019	Fórmula México	Garcia Motorsports	2	0	0	0	0	158	11th
2019	Fast Racing Series Mexico		4	0	0	0	0	0	?
2019–20	NACAM Formula 4 Championship	Ram Racing	8	0	0	0	0	32	15th
2020	F4 Spanish Championship	Global Racing Service	21	0	0	0	0	4	22nd
2021	Super Touring 2 Light Mexico	HDI Seguros	2	0	1	?	2	192	16th
2021	F4 Spanish Championship	Campos Racing	21	0	0	0	0	2	24th
2022	Euroformula Open Championship	Team Motopark	26	0	0	0	1	116	7th
2023	European Le Mans Series - LMP3	Cool Racing	6	3	1	0	5	121	**1st**
2023	FIA Formula 3 Championship	Jenzer Motorsport	18	0	0	0	0	12	20th
2023–24	Asian Le Mans Series - LMP2	Nielsen Racing	5	0	0	0	0	12	12th
2024	European Le Mans Series - LMP2	Cool Racing	2	0	0	0	1	18	19th

* Season still in progress.

=== Complete NACAM Formula 4 Championship results ===
(key) (Races in bold indicate pole position) (Races in italics indicate fastest lap)

Year	Team	1	2	3	4	5	6	7	8	9	10	11	12	13	14	15	16	17	18	19	20	Pos	Points
2018–19	Ram Racing	AHR1; 1; 11	AHR1; 2; 10	PUE1; 1; 5	PUE1; 2; 5	PUE1; 3; 3	SLP; 1; 7	SLP; 2; 8	SLP; 3; 6	MTY; 1; 5	MTY; 2; 7	MTY; 3; 4	AGS; 1; 5	AGS; 2; 3	AGS; 3; 2	PUE2; 1; 8	PUE2; 2; 6	PUE2; 3; 8	AHR2; 1; 8	AHR2; 2; 4	AHR2; 3; 4	5th	169
2019–20	Ram Racing	AHR; 1; 8	AHR; 2; 5	AGS; 1 Ret	AGS; 2; 8	AGS; 3; 7	PUE; 1; 8	PUE; 2; 8	PUE; 3; 11†	MER; 1	MER; 2	MER; 3	QUE1; 1	QUE1; 2	QUE1; 3	QUE2; 1	QUE2; 2	QUE2; 3	MTY; 1	MTY; 2	MTY; 3	15th	32

=== Complete F4 Spanish Championship results ===
(key) (Races in bold indicate pole position) (Races in italics indicate fastest lap)

Year	Team	1	2	3	4	5	6	7	8	9	10	11	12	13	14	15	16	17	18	19	20	21	DC	Points
2020	Global Racing Service	NAV; 1 DSQ	NAV; 2 DSQ	NAV; 3 DSQ	LEC; 1; 15	LEC; 2; 14	LEC; 3; 16	JER; 1; 9	JER; 2; 9	JER; 3; 11	CRT; 1; 11	CRT; 2; 12	CRT; 3; 9	ARA; 1; 12	ARA; 2; 16	ARA; 3; 11	JAR; 1; 13	JAR; 2; 13	JAR; 3 Ret	CAT; 1; 12	CAT; 2; 17	CAT; 3; 11	22nd	4
2021	Campos Racing	SPA; 1; 11	SPA; 2; 15	SPA; 3; 24†	NAV; 1; 19	NAV; 2 Ret	NAV; 3 Ret	ALG; 1; 12	ALG; 2; 14	ALG; 3; 21†	ARA; 1; 19	ARA; 2; 8	ARA; 3; 19	CRT; 1; 10	CRT; 2; 10	CRT; 3 Ret	JER; 1; 15	JER; 2; 15	JER; 3; 15	CAT; 1; 11	CAT; 2; 22	CAT; 3 Ret	24th	2

=== Complete Euroformula Open Championship results ===
(key) (Races in bold indicate pole position) (Races in italics indicate fastest lap)

Year	Team	1	2	3	4	5	6	7	8	9	10	11	12	13	14	15	16	17	18	19	20	21	22	23	24	25	26	Pos	Points
2022	Team Motopark	EST; 1; 11	EST; 2; 10	EST; 3; 12	PAU; 1; 6	PAU; 2; 9	LEC; 1 Ret	LEC; 2; 7	LEC; 3; 9	SPA; 1; 5	SPA; 2; 4	SPA; 3; 9†	HUN; 1; 9	HUN; 2; 8	HUN; 3; 8	IMO; 1; 7	IMO; 2 Ret	IMO; 3; 7	RBR; 1 Ret	RBR; 2 Ret	RBR; 3 Ret	MNZ; 1 Ret	MNZ; 2; 3*	MNZ; 3; 4	CAT; 1; 7	CAT; 2; 7	CAT; 3; 5	7th	116

=== Complete FIA Formula 3 Championship results ===
(key) (Races in bold indicate pole position) (Races in italics indicate fastest lap)

Year	Entrant	1	2	3	4	5	6	7	8	9	10	11	12	13	14	15	16	17	18	DC	Points
2023	Jenzer Motorsport	BHR; SPR; 27	BHR; FEA; 29†	MEL; SPR; Ret	MEL; FEA; 20	MON; SPR; 26	MON; FEA; 21	CAT; SPR; 22	CAT; FEA; 22	RBR; SPR; Ret	RBR; FEA; 23	SIL; SPR; 11	SIL; FEA; 26	HUN; SPR; 27†	HUN; FEA; 26	SPA; SPR; 18	SPA; FEA; 4	MNZ; SPR; 17	MNZ; FEA; 21	20th	12

=== Complete European Le Mans Series results ===
(key) (Races in bold indicate pole position; results in italics indicate fastest lap)

Year	Entrant	Class	Chassis	Engine	1	2	3	4	5	6	Rank	Points
2023	Cool Racing	LMP3	Ligier JS P320	Nissan VK56DE 5.6 L V8	**CAT**; 1	LEC; 3	ARA; 1	SPA; 1	PRT; 4	ALG; 2	1st	121
2024	Cool Racing	LMP2	Oreca 07	Gibson GK428 4.2 L V8	CAT; 12	LEC; 2	IMO	SPA	MUG	ALG	19th	18

=== Complete Asian Le Mans Series results ===
(key) (Races in bold indicate pole position) (Races in italics indicate fastest lap)

Year	Team	Class	Car	Engine	1	2	3	4	5	Pos.	Points
2023–24	Nielsen Racing	LMP2	Oreca 07	Gibson GK428 4.2 L V8	SEP; 1; 9	SEP; 2 Ret	DUB; 9	ABU; 1; 9	ABU; 2; 7	12th	12
