= 2018–19 NACAM Formula 4 Championship =

Motor racing competition

Seasons
- ← 2017–18 2019–20 →

The 2018–19 NACAM Formula 4 Championship season was the fourth season of the NACAM Formula 4 Championship. It began on 26 October 2018 at the Autódromo Hermanos Rodríguez in Mexico City and ended on 4 August 2019 at the same venue after seven rounds.

== Teams and drivers ==
Team	No.	Driver	Rounds
(Mexico) Ram Racing	2	(Mexico) Manuel Sulaimán	All
(Mexico) Ram Racing	8	(Mexico) Noel León	1
(Mexico) Ram Racing	31	(Mexico) Álex García	All
(Mexico) Scuderia Martiga EG	5	(United States) Kory Enders	1
(Mexico) Scuderia Martiga EG	6	(Mexico) Chara Mansur	All
(Mexico) Scuderia Martiga EG	7	(United States) Jak Crawford	All
(Mexico) Scuderia Martiga EG	22	(Canada) Nicholas Christodoulou	3–7
(Mexico) Easy-Shop.com Racing	9	(Mexico) Daniel Forcadell	All
(Mexico) Telcel RPL Racing	10	(Bolivia) Rodrigo Gutiérrez	2
(Mexico) Telcel RPL Racing	10	(Mexico) Pipo Villa	4–6
(Mexico) Telcel RPL Racing	11	(Mexico) Mariano Martínez	1
(Mexico) Telcel RPL Racing	12	(Mexico) Pablo Pérez de Lara	All
(Mexico) Telcel RPL Racing	20	(Mexico) Emiliano Richards	3–7
(Mexico) Telcel RPL Racing	58	(Mexico) Emiliano Tagosam	5–7
(Mexico) Telcel RPL Racing	77	(Guatemala) Mateo Llarena	1–6
(Mexico) Telcel RPL Racing	99	(Mexico) José Garfias	7
(Mexico) Rand Team	10	(Mexico) Eloy Sebastián López	7
(Brazil) Prop Car Racing	13	(Mexico) Íñigo León	1
(Brazil) Prop Car Racing	70	(Puerto Rico) Gabriel Bacó	1
(Mexico) FRF Racing	19	(Mexico) Diego Ortíz	1
(Mexico) FRF Racing	28	(Mexico) Mariano del Castillo	2–7
(Mexico) FRF Racing	29	(Mexico) Luis Fernando Segura	7
(Mexico) FRF Racing	77	(Mexico) Ricardo Escotto	7
(Panama) JLBernal Racing	22	(Canada) Nicholas Christodoulou	1–2
(Mexico) FF&R IBC Group	53	(Mexico) Álex Servín	3–7
TBA	0	(Mexico) José Sierra	2
TBA	10	(Mexico) José Sierra	3
TBA	18	(Mexico) Álex Servín	2

== Race calendar and results ==
All rounds were held in Mexico. The first round was held in support of the 2018 Mexican Grand Prix.

Round		Circuit	Date	Pole position	Fastest lap	Winning driver	Winning team
2018
1	R1	Autódromo Hermanos Rodríguez (Mexico City)	27 October	(United States) Kory Enders	(United States) Kory Enders	(Mexico) Manuel Sulaimán	(Mexico) Ram Racing
1	R2	Autódromo Hermanos Rodríguez (Mexico City)	28 October		(United States) Kory Enders	(United States) Kory Enders	(Mexico) Scuderia Martiga EG
2019
2	R1	Autódromo Miguel E. Abed (Amozoc, Puebla)	2 February	(Mexico) Manuel Sulaimán	(United States) Jak Crawford	(Mexico) Manuel Sulaimán	(Mexico) Ram Racing
2	R2	Autódromo Miguel E. Abed (Amozoc, Puebla)	3 February		(United States) Jak Crawford	(United States) Jak Crawford	(Mexico) Scuderia Martiga EG
2	R3	Autódromo Miguel E. Abed (Amozoc, Puebla)	3 February	(Mexico) Manuel Sulaimán	(United States) Jak Crawford	(Mexico) Manuel Sulaimán	(Mexico) Ram Racing
3	R1	Parque Tangamanga (San Luis Potosí, San Luis Potosí)	16 March	(Mexico) Manuel Sulaimán	(Mexico) Manuel Sulaimán	(Mexico) Manuel Sulaimán	(Mexico) Ram Racing
3	R2	Parque Tangamanga (San Luis Potosí, San Luis Potosí)	17 March		(United States) Jak Crawford	(United States) Jak Crawford	(Mexico) Scuderia Martiga EG
3	R3	Parque Tangamanga (San Luis Potosí, San Luis Potosí)	17 March	(Mexico) Manuel Sulaimán	(Mexico) Manuel Sulaimán	(Mexico) Pablo Pérez de Lara	(Mexico) Telcel RPL Racing
4	R1	Autódromo de Monterrey (Apodaca, Nuevo León)	13 April	(Mexico) Manuel Sulaimán	(Mexico) Manuel Sulaimán	(Mexico) Manuel Sulaimán	(Mexico) Ram Racing
4	R2	Autódromo de Monterrey (Apodaca, Nuevo León)	14 April		(United States) Jak Crawford	(Mexico) Manuel Sulaimán	(Mexico) Ram Racing
4	R3	Autódromo de Monterrey (Apodaca, Nuevo León)	14 April	(Mexico) Manuel Sulaimán	(United States) Jak Crawford	(Mexico) Manuel Sulaimán	(Mexico) Ram Racing
5	R1	Autódromo Internacional de Aguascalientes (Aguascalientes, Aguascalientes)	18 May	(Mexico) Manuel Sulaimán	(Mexico) Manuel Sulaimán	(Mexico) Manuel Sulaimán	(Mexico) Ram Racing
5	R2	Autódromo Internacional de Aguascalientes (Aguascalientes, Aguascalientes)	19 May		(Mexico) Emiliano Richards	(Mexico) Emiliano Richards	(Mexico) Telcel RPL Racing
5	R3	Autódromo Internacional de Aguascalientes (Aguascalientes, Aguascalientes)	19 May	(Mexico) Manuel Sulaimán	(United States) Jak Crawford	(Mexico) Manuel Sulaimán	(Mexico) Ram Racing
6	R1	Autódromo Miguel E. Abed (Amozoc, Puebla)	15 June	(United States) Jak Crawford	(United States) Jak Crawford	(United States) Jak Crawford	(Mexico) Scuderia Martiga EG
6	R2	Autódromo Miguel E. Abed (Amozoc, Puebla)	16 June		(United States) Jak Crawford	(Mexico) Pablo Pérez de Lara	(Mexico) Telcel RPL Racing
6	R3	Autódromo Miguel E. Abed (Amozoc, Puebla)	16 June	(United States) Jak Crawford	(United States) Jak Crawford	(United States) Jak Crawford	(Mexico) Scuderia Martiga EG
7	R1	Autódromo Hermanos Rodríguez (Mexico City)	3 August	(United States) Jak Crawford	(Canada) Nicholas Christodoulou	(United States) Jak Crawford	(Mexico) Scuderia Martiga EG
7	R2	Autódromo Hermanos Rodríguez (Mexico City)	4 August		(United States) Jak Crawford	(United States) Jak Crawford	(Mexico) Scuderia Martiga EG
7	R3	Autódromo Hermanos Rodríguez (Mexico City)	4 August	(Canada) Nicholas Christodoulou	(United States) Jak Crawford	(Mexico) Manuel Sulaimán	(Mexico) Ram Racing

== Championship standings ==
Points were awarded to the top 10 classified finishers in each race.

Position	**1st**	**2nd**	**3rd**	**4th**	**5th**	**6th**	**7th**	**8th**	**9th**	**10th**
Points	25	18	15	12	10	8	6	4	2	1

=== Drivers' Championship ===
Pos	Driver	AHR1		PUE			SLP			MTY			AGS			PUE			AHR2			Pts
Pos	Driver	R1	R2	R1	R2	R3	R1	R2	R3	R1	R2	R3	R1	R2	R3	R1	R2	R3	R1	R2	R3	Pts
1	(Mexico) Manuel Sulaimán	1	2	**1**	Ret	**1**	**1**	4	**Ret**	**1**	1	**1**	**1**	2	**1**	2	8	2	2	5	1	366
2	(United States) Jak Crawford	5	3	3	1	2	2	1	4	Ret	2	6	2	4	Ret	**1**	3	**1**	**1**	1	2	322
3	(Mexico) Pablo Pérez de Lara	2	5	2	3	4	5	2	1	NC	5	NC	3	7	4	4	1	4	4	3	12	245
4	(Canada) Nicholas Christodoulou	13	8	10	6	6	3	3	3	2	4	2	4	5	3	3	4	3	3	2	**3**	243
5	(Mexico) Álex García	11	10	5	5	3	7	8	6	5	7	4	5	3	2	8	6	8	8	4	4	169
6	(Mexico) Emiliano Richards						6	7	2	3	3	3	6	1	7	5	7	5	Ret	12	5	152
7	(Mexico) Mariano del Castillo			4	2	7	4	NC	5	7	Ret	7	7	6	5	7	2	7	11	10	Ret	127
8	(Mexico) Chara Mansur	12	9	6	7	8	5	5	7	6	8	8	9	8	6	6	5	6	5	8	9	120
9	(Mexico) Daniel Forcadell	7	13	7	4	Ret	8	6	8	4	6	5	8	NC	Ret	NC	9	Ret	DNS	DNS	Ret	76
10	(United States) Kory Enders	**4**	1																			37
11	(Mexico) Noel León	3	4																			27
12	(Mexico) Luis Fernando Segura																		7	7	7	18
13	(Guatemala) Mateo Llarena	8	7	8	Ret	9	DNS			DNS			Ret	Ret	Ret	Ret	Ret	Ret				18
14	(Mexico) Eloy Sebastián López																		10	6	6	17
15	(Mexico) José Garfias																		6	9	8	14
16	(Puerto Rico) Gabriel Bacó	6	12																			8
17	(Mexico) Íñigo León	Ret	6																			8
18	(Mexico) Ricardo Escotto																		9	11	10	3
19	(Mexico) Mariano Martínez	9	Ret																			2
20	(Bolivia) Rodrigo Gutiérrez			9	Ret	DNS																2
21	(Mexico) Diego Ortíz	10	11																			1
22	(Mexico) Álex Servín			DNS	Ret	DNS	DNS			DNS			DNS	Ret	Ret	Ret	Ret	Ret	DNS	Ret	11	0
–	(Mexico) Emiliano Tagosam												Ret	Ret	Ret	Ret	Ret	Ret	DNS			0
–	(Mexico) Pipo Villa									DNS			DNS	Ret	Ret	Ret	Ret	Ret				0
–	(Colombia) Lucas Medina															DNS	Ret	Ret				0
Drivers ineligible for championship points
	(Mexico) José Sierra			DNS		5	DNS															
Pos	Driver	R1	R2	R1	R2	R3	R1	R2	R3	R1	R2	R3	R1	R2	R3	R1	R2	R3	R1	R2	R3	Pts
Pos	Driver	AHR1		PUE			SLP			MTY			AGS			PUE			AHR2			Pts

Colour	Result
Gold	Winner
Silver	Second place
Bronze	Third place
Green	Points classification
Blue	Non-points classification
Blue	Non-classified finish (NC)
Purple	Retired, not classified (Ret)
Red	Did not qualify (DNQ)
Red	Did not pre-qualify (DNPQ)
Black	Disqualified (DSQ)
White	Did not start (DNS)
White	Withdrew (WD)
White	Race cancelled (C)
Blank	Did not practice (DNP)
Blank	Did not arrive (DNA)
Blank	Excluded (EX)

**Bold** – Pole
Italics – Fastest Lap
